= List of Dungeons & Dragons 5th edition monsters =

Dungeons & Dragons 5th edition (see editions of Dungeons & Dragons) was released in 2014. The first product containing monsters was the Dungeons & Dragons Starter Set. The Monster Manual for this edition was scheduled for release in September 2014.

== Monsters in the 5th edition of Dungeons & Dragons ==
The 5th edition of the game adapts many creatures from previous editions while also creating new ones. Chroniclers of the art of Dungeons & Dragons Michael Witwer et al. observed "overhauled [...] visual aesthetics" and a more "unified tone and direction" in the depictions of the monsters as compared to earlier editions, which also allowed a more convincing impression of previously "neglected creatures" with the goal to make them more popular for Dungeon Masters. Other reviews noted that 5th edition monsters are more developed in terms of narrative and lore than previous editions.

Despite Wizards of the Coast's efforts at creating a more inclusive game with 5th edition, scholars have criticized this edition of the game for perpetuating misogynistic representations of women, specifically through the depiction, and significant space relative to previous editions, of Hags. William Duffy notes that 5th edition continues the practice of integrating monsters from classical mythology but makes significant canonical changes: cursed elves give rise to Medusas and Harpies, Minotaurs are transformed cultists, and Lamias and Chimeras are the creation of the demon princes Graz'zt and Demogorgon.

== A92160000 – Dungeons & Dragons Starter Set (2014) ==
The Dungeons & Dragons Starter Set is the first official product from the 5th edition Dungeons & Dragons line. It includes the introductory adventure module Lost Mine of Phandelver, which contains rules and descriptions for monsters in Appendix B.

ISBN 978-0-7869-6559-5

Creature	Page	Other Appearances	Variants	Description
Bugbear	56	Supplement I: Greyhawk (1975), D&D Basic Set (1977, 1981, 1983), Monster Manual (1977), Monstrous Compendium Volume One (1989), Dungeons & Dragons Rules Cyclopedia (1991), Monstrous Manual (1993), Monster Manual (2000), Monster Manual (2003), Monster Manual (2008), Monster Vault (2010)		Intimidating and bullying goblinoids. A hairy cousin of the goblin, for the most part presented as inherently evil before the 5th edition of the game,
Commoner	56			Average person of any race
Cultist	56			Servants of dark powers
Doppelganger	56–57	Supplement I: Greyhawk (1975), D&D Basic Set (1977, 1981, 1983), Monster Manual (1977), Monstrous Compendium Volume Two (1989), Dungeons & Dragons Rules Cyclopedia (1991), Monstrous Manual (1993), Monster Manual (2000), Monster Manual (2003), Monster Manual (2008), Monster Vault (2010)		Shapechangers that take on the form of other humanoids
Evil Mage	57			Evil spellcasters that seek arcane knowledge
Flameskull	57–58	Dragon #197 (1993), Monstrous Compendium Annual Volume One (1994), Lost Empires of Faerûn (2005), Monster Manual (2008)		Floating, fiery skulls created from dead wizards
Ghoul	58	Dungeons & Dragons set (1974), D&D Basic Set (1981, 1983), Monster Manual (1977), Monstrous Compendium Volume One (1989), Dungeons & Dragons Rules Cyclopedia (1991), Monstrous Manual (1993), Monster Manual (2000), Monster Manual (2003), Monster Manual (2008), Monster Vault (2010)		Undead that work in packs and hunger for humanoid flesh. Undead with "terrible claws". AD&D's ghouls were also adapted into the Magic: The Gathering trading card game, with a depiction taken from the Monster Manual being used in a prototype version.
Giant Spider	58			Large spiders that dwell in webbed lairs
Goblin	58	Dungeons & Dragons set (1974), D&D Basic Set (1977, 1981, 1983), Monster Manual (1977), Monstrous Compendium Volume One (1989), Dungeons & Dragons Rules Cyclopedia (1991), Monstrous Manual (1993), Monster Manual (2000), Monster Manual (2003), Monster Manual (2008), Monster Vault (2010)		Untrustworthy humanoids that use numbers to their advantage
Grick	58–59	Monster Manual (2000), Monster Manual (2003), Monster Manual (2008)		Wormlike, tentacled creatures that conceal themselves near stonework
Hobgoblin	59	Dungeons & Dragons set (1974), D&D Basic Set (1977, 1981, 1983), Monster Manual (1977), Monstrous Compendium Volume One (1989), Dungeons & Dragons Rules Cyclopedia (1991), Monstrous Manual (1993), Monster Manual (2000), Monster Manual (2003), Monster Manual (2008), Monster Vault (2010)		Militaristic, cunning goblinoids. Muscular humanoids somewhat taller than humans with reddish skin and canine teeth. Mordenkainen Presents: Monsters of the Multiverse gave them a new background as a species originating in and expelled from the Feywild, while also presenting hobgoblins societies with different characteristics on different worlds, but all centered around forming close-knit groups.
Mormesk the Wraith	59			Hateful and incorporeal undead that drains life
Nezznar the Black Spider	59			Dark elf wizard
Nothic	60	Miniatures Handbook (2003), Monster Manual 2 (2009)		Former wizards transformed by forbidden knowledge
Ochre Jelly	60	Dungeons & Dragons set (1974), D&D Basic Set (1977, 1981, 1983), Monster Manual (1977), Monstrous Compendium Volume One (1989), Dungeons & Dragons Rules Cyclopedia (1991), Monstrous Manual (1993), Monster Manual (2000), Monster Manual (2003), Monster Manual (2008), Monster Vault (2010)		Oozes that stalk and devour organic life
Ogre	60–61	Dungeons & Dragons set (1974), D&D Basic Set (1977, 1981, 1983), Monster Manual (1977), Monstrous Compendium Volume One (1989), Dungeons & Dragons Rules Cyclopedia (1991), Monstrous Manual (1993), Monster Manual (2000), Monster Manual (2003), Monster Manual (2008), Monster Vault (2010)		Large, angry, and lazy giants
Orc	61	Dungeons & Dragons set (1974), D&D Basic Set (1977, 1981, 1983), Monster Manual (1977), Monstrous Compendium Volume One (1989), Dungeons & Dragons Rules Cyclopedia (1991), Monstrous Manual (1993), Monster Manual (2000), Monster Manual (2003), Monster Manual (2008), Monster Vault (2010)		Savage humanoids with piglike faces
Owlbear	61	Supplement I: Greyhawk (1975), D&D Basic Set (1977, 1981, 1983), Monster Manual (1977), Monstrous Compendium Volume One (1989), Dungeons & Dragons Rules Cyclopedia (1991), Monstrous Manual (1993), Monster Manual (2000), Monster Manual (2003), Monster Manual (2008), Monster Vault (2010)		Fearsome predators with beaks and claws
Redbrand Ruffian	61			Unprincipled human thugs
Sildar Hallwinter	61			Retired warrior of Neverwinter and member of the Lords' Alliance
Skeleton	62	Dungeons & Dragons set (1974), D&D Basic Set (1977, 1981, 1983), Monster Manual (1977), Monstrous Compendium Volume One (1989), Dungeons & Dragons Rules Cyclopedia (1991), Monstrous Manual (1993), Monster Manual (2000), Monster Manual (2003), Monster Manual (2008), Monster Vault (2010)		Undead creatures created from bones
Spectator	62	The Secret of Bone Hill (1981), Monster Manual II (1983), Monstrous Compendium – Forgotten Realms Appendix (1989), Monstrous Manual (1993), Monstrous Compendium: Monsters of Faerûn (2001), Lords of Madness: The Book of Aberrations (2005)		Spheroid creatures with an array of eye rays that guard treasure
Stirge	62–63	Supplement I: Greyhawk (1975), D&D Basic Set (1977, 1981, 1983), Monster Manual (1977), Monstrous Compendium Volume Two (1989), Dungeons & Dragons Rules Cyclopedia (1991), Monstrous Manual (1993), Monster Manual (2000), Monster Manual (2003), Monster Manual (2008), Monster Vault (2010)		Winged, blood-drinking pests
Twig Blight	63	The Sunless Citadel (2000), Monster Manual II (2002), Monster Vault: Threats to the Nentir Vale (2011)		Small plant creatures that hide among healthy foliage
Wolf	63			Animals that roam in packs
Young Green Dragon	63	Dungeons & Dragons set (1974), D&D Basic Set (1981, 1983), Monster Manual (1977), Monstrous Compendium Volume One (1989), Dungeons & Dragons Rules Cyclopedia (1991), Monstrous Manual (1993), Monster Manual (2000), Monster Manual (2003), Monster Manual (2008), Monster Vault (2010)		Evil dragon with poisonous breath
Zombie	31, 63	Dungeons & Dragons set (1974), D&D Basic Set (1977, 1981, 1983), Monster Manual (1977), Monstrous Compendium Volume One (1989), Dungeons & Dragons Rules Cyclopedia (1991), Monstrous Manual (1993), Monster Manual (2000), Monster Manual (2003), Monster Manual (2008), Monster Vault (2010)	Ash Zombie	Undead creatures created from corpses

== A92170000 – Player's Handbook (2014) ==
The Player's Handbook is one of the core rulebooks for the Dungeons & Dragons 5th edition, published in 2014. An assortment of monsters, associated with class traits and spells, are described in Appendix D.

ISBN 978-0-7869-6560-1

Creature	Page	Other Appearances	Variants	Description
Bat	304			
Black Bear	304			
Boar	304			
Brown Bear	304			
Cat	305			
Constrictor Snake	305			
Crocodile	305			
Dire Wolf	305	Monster Manual (1977), D&D Basic Set (1981, 1983), Monstrous Compendium Volume One (1989), Dungeons & Dragons Rules Cyclopedia (1991), Monstrous Manual (1993), Monster Manual (2000), Monster Manual (2003), Monster Manual (2008), Monster Vault (2010)		
Frog	305			
Giant Eagle	306	Monster Manual (1977), Creature Catalogue (1986), Monstrous Compendium Volume Two (1989), Creature Catalog (1993), Monstrous Manual (1993), Monster Manual (2000), Monster Manual (2003)		
Giant Spider	306	Dungeons & Dragons Starter Set (2014)		
Hawk (Falcon)	306			
Imp	306–307	Monster Manual (1977), Monstrous Compendium Volume One (1989), Monstrous Manual (1993), Monstrous Compendium – Planescape Appendix (1994), Monster Manual (2000), Monster Manual (2003), Monster Manual (2008), Monster Vault (2010)		
Lion	307			
Mastiff	307			
Mule	307			
Owl	308			
Panther	308			
Poisonous Snake	308			
Pseudodragon	308	Monster Manual (1977), Monstrous Compendium Volume One (1989), Monstrous Manual (1993), Monster Manual (2000), Monster Manual (2003), Monster Manual (2008), Monster Vault (2010)		
Quasit	309	Monster Manual (1977), Monstrous Compendium Volume One (1989), Monstrous Manual (1993), Monstrous Compendium – Planescape Appendix (1994), Monster Manual (2000), Monster Manual (2003), Monster Manual 3 (2010)		Reviewer Philippe Tessier found the quasit "very nice" and interesting when made available as a familiar.
Rat	309			Example of a monster posing little threat to the characters in the game, suitable for play at lowest level.
Raven	309			
Reef Shark	309			
Riding Horse	310			
Skeleton	310	Dungeons & Dragons Starter Set (2014)		
Sprite	310	Monster Manual (1977), D&D Basic Set (1981, 1983), Monstrous Compendium Volume One (1989), Monstrous Manual (1993), Monster Manual (2000), Monster Manual (2003)		
Tiger	311			
Warhorse	311			
Wolf	311	Dungeons & Dragons Starter Set (2014)		
Zombie	311	Dungeons & Dragons Starter Set (2014)		

== A96060000 – Hoard of the Dragon Queen (2014) ==
Hoard of the Dragon Queen is the first adventure module for the 5th edition Dungeons & Dragons line. It contains statistics for some of the monsters described in the module in Appendix B; the rest are in an online supplement.

ISBN 978-0-7869-6564-9

Creature	Page	Other Appearances	Variants	Description
Troll	65, Online Supplement 19	Dungeons & Dragons set (1974), D&D Basic Set (1977), Monster Manual (1977), D&D Expert Set (1981, 1983), Monstrous Compendium Volume One (1989), Dungeons & Dragons Rules Cyclopedia (1991), Monstrous Manual (1993), Monster Manual (2000), Monster Manual (2003), Monster Manual (2008), Monster Vault (2010)	Four-Armed Troll	
Ambush Drake	88	Monster Manual III (2004), Monster Vault (2010)		
Azbara Jos	88			
Blagothkus	89			
Captain Othelstan	89			
Dragonclaw	89		Dragonwing	
Dralmorrer Borngray	90			
Frulam Mondath	90			
Guard Drake	91	Monster Manual (2008), Monster Vault (2010)		
Jamna Gleamsilver	91			
Langdedrosa Cyanwrath	91			
Pharblex Spattergoo	91–92			
Rath Modar	92			
Rezmir	93			
Talis the White	93			
Acolyte	Online Supplement 4			
Adult Blue Dragon	Online Supplement 4	Dungeons & Dragons set (1974), Monster Manual (1977), D&D Basic Set (1981, 1983), Monstrous Compendium Volume One (1989), Dungeons & Dragons Rules Cyclopedia (1991), Monstrous Manual (1993), Monster Manual (2000), Monster Manual (2003), Monster Manual (2008)		
Adult White Dragon	Online Supplement 5	Dungeons & Dragons set (1974), D&D Basic Set (1977, 1981, 1983), Monster Manual (1977), Monstrous Compendium Volume One (1989), Dungeons & Dragons Rules Cyclopedia (1991), Monstrous Manual (1993), Monster Manual (2000), Monster Manual (2003), Monster Manual (2008)		
Air Elemental	Online Supplement 5	Dungeons & Dragons set (1974), Supplement I: Greyhawk (1975), Monster Manual (1977), D&D Expert Set (1981, 1983), Monstrous Compendium Volume One (1989), Dungeons & Dragons Rules Cyclopedia (1991), Monstrous Manual (1993), Monster Manual (2000), Monster Manual (2003), Monster Manual 3 (2010), Monster Vault (2010)		Powerful creatures in the game; a characteristic of the air elemental is the ability of rapid movement.
Assassin	Online Supplement 6			
Bandit	Online Supplement 6			
Berserker	Online Supplement 6			Berserkers are based on the berserkir, "men of Odin, whom the god made strong like wild beasts", from Icelandic sagas and Snorri Sturluson's history of the kings of Norway.
Bullywug	Online Supplement 7	Fiend Folio (1981), Monstrous Compendium Volume Two (1989), Monstrous Manual (1993), Monstrous Compendium: Monsters of Faerûn (2001), Monster Manual 2 (2009)		
Commoner	Online Supplement 7	Dungeons & Dragons Starter Set (2014)		
Crocodile	Online Supplement 7	Player's Handbook (2014)		
Cultist	Online Supplement 7	Dungeons & Dragons Starter Set (2014)		
Deer	Online Supplement 7			
Doppelganger	Online Supplement 8	Dungeons & Dragons Starter Set (2014)		
Elk	Online Supplement 8			
Ettercap	Online Supplement 9	Fiend Folio (1981), Monstrous Compendium Volume Two (1989), Monstrous Manual (1993), Monster Manual (2000), Monster Manual (2003), Monster Manual (2008)		
Gargoyle	Online Supplement 9	Dungeons & Dragons set (1974), D&D Basic Set (1977, 1981, 1983), Monster Manual (1977), Monstrous Compendium Volume Two (1989), Dungeons & Dragons Rules Cyclopedia (1991), Monstrous Manual (1993), Monster Manual (2000), Monster Manual (2003), Monster Manual (2008), Monster Vault (2010)		
Giant Centipede	Online Supplement 9			Giant centipedes are "low-level monsters", one-foot long red many-legged creatures.
Giant Frog	Online Supplement 10	Supplement II: Blackmoor (1975), Monster Manual (1977), Monstrous Compendium Volume Two (1989), Monstrous Manual (1993), Return to the Temple of Elemental Evil (2001)		
Giant Lizard	Online Supplement 10			
Giant Spider	Online Supplement 10	Dungeons & Dragons Starter Set (2014)		
Gray Ooze	Online Supplement 11	Dungeons & Dragons set (1974), D&D Basic Set (1977, 1981, 1983), Monster Manual (1977), Monstrous Compendium Volume One (1989), Dungeons & Dragons Rules Cyclopedia (1991), Monstrous Manual (1993), Monster Manual (2000), Monster Manual (2003)		
Griffon	Online Supplement 11	Dungeons & Dragons set (1974), D&D Basic Set (1977), Monster Manual (1977), D&D Expert Set (1981, 1983), Monstrous Compendium Volume Two (1989), Dungeons & Dragons Rules Cyclopedia (1991), Monstrous Manual (1993), Monster Manual (2000), Monster Manual (2003), Monster Manual (2008)		Originally based on the creature from Persian mythology.
Guard	Online Supplement 11			
Helmed Horror	Online Supplement 11	Halls of the High King (1990), Forgotten Realms Campaign Setting (1993), Monstrous Compendium Annual Volume One (1994), Monstrous Compendium: Monsters of Faerûn (2001), Lost Empires of Faerûn (2005), Monster Manual (2008)		
Hobgoblin	Online Supplement 12	Dungeons & Dragons Starter Set (2014)	Hobgoblin Captain	
Knight	Online Supplement 12			
Kobold	Online Supplement 13	Dungeons & Dragons set (1974), D&D Basic Set (1977, 1981, 1983), Monster Manual (1977), Monstrous Compendium Volume One (1989), Dungeons & Dragons Rules Cyclopedia (1991), Monstrous Manual (1993), Monster Manual (2000), Monster Manual (2003), Monster Manual (2008), Monster Vault (2010)		
Lizardfolk	Online Supplement 13	Supplement I: Greyhawk (1975), D&D Basic Set (1977, 1981, 1983), Monster Manual (1977), Monstrous Compendium Volume One (1989), Dungeons & Dragons Rules Cyclopedia (1991), Monstrous Manual (1993), Monster Manual (2000), Monster Manual (2003), Monster Manual (2008), Monster Vault (2010)		
Mage	Online Supplement 13			
Noble	Online Supplement 13			
Ogre	Online Supplement 14	Dungeons & Dragons Starter Set (2014)		
Orc	Online Supplement 14	Dungeons & Dragons Starter Set (2014)		
Otyugh	Online Supplement 14	Monster Manual (1977), Monstrous Compendium Volume Two (1989), Monstrous Manual (1993), Monster Manual (2000), Monster Manual (2003), Monster Manual (2008), Monster Vault (2010)		Also known as gulguthra. Game designer Don Turnbull rated the otyugh as a "most interesting creation".
Peryton	Online Supplement 15	Monster Manual (1977), Monstrous Compendium – Forgotten Realms Appendix II (1991), Monstrous Manual (1993), Monstrous Compendium: Monsters of Faerûn (2001), Monster Vault: Threats to the Nentir Vale (2011)		
Priest	Online Supplement 15			
Roper	Online Supplement 15	The Strategic Review #2 (1975), Monster Manual (1977), Quest for the Heartstone (1984), Creature Catalogue (1986), Monstrous Compendium Volume Two (1989), Creature Catalog (1993), Monstrous Manual (1993), Monster Manual (2000), Monster Manual (2003), Monster Manual (2008), Monster Vault (2010)		
Rug of Smothering	Online Supplement 16	Monster Manual (2014)		
Scout	Online Supplement 16			
Shambling Mound	Online Supplement 16	The Strategic Review #3 (1975), Monster Manual (1977), Monstrous Compendium Volume Two (1989), Monstrous Manual (1993), Monster Manual (2000), Monster Manual (2003), Monster Manual (2008)		
Specter	Online Supplement 17	Dungeons & Dragons set (1974), D&D Basic Set (1977), Monster Manual (1977), D&D Expert Set (1981, 1983), Monstrous Compendium Volume One (1989), Dungeons & Dragons Rules Cyclopedia (1991), Monstrous Manual (1993), Monster Manual (2000), Monster Manual (2003), Monster Manual (2008)		
Spy	Online Supplement 17			
Stirge	Online Supplement 17	Dungeons & Dragons Starter Set (2014)		
Stone Giant	Online Supplement 18	Dungeons & Dragons set (1974), D&D Basic Set (1977), Monster Manual (1977), D&D Expert Set (1981, 1983), Monstrous Compendium Volume One (1989), Dungeons & Dragons Rules Cyclopedia (1991), Monstrous Manual (1993), Monster Manual (2000), Monster Manual (2003), Monster Manual 2 (2009)		
Stone Golem	Online Supplement 18	Supplement I: Greyhawk (1975), Monster Manual (1977), Monstrous Compendium Volume One (1989), Monstrous Manual (1993), Monster Manual (2000), Monster Manual (2003), Monster Manual (2008), Monster Vault (2010)		
Swarm of Insects	Online Supplement 18		Swarm of Centipedes	
Swarm of Rats	Online Supplement 19			
Troglodyte	Online Supplement 19	Monster Manual (1977), D&D Basic Set (1981, 1983), Monstrous Compendium Volume Two (1989), Dungeons & Dragons Rules Cyclopedia (1991), Monstrous Manual (1993), Monster Manual (2000), Monster Manual (2003), Monster Manual (2008), Monster Vault (2010)		
Vampire	Online Supplement 20	Dungeons & Dragons set (1974), Supplement I: Greyhawk (1975), D&D Basic Set (1977), Monster Manual (1977), D&D Expert Set (1981, 1983), Monstrous Compendium Volume One (1989), Dungeons & Dragons Rules Cyclopedia (1991), Monstrous Manual (1993), Monster Manual (2000), Monster Manual (2003), Monster Manual (2008), Monster Vault (2010)		
Vampire Spawn	Online Supplement 21	Monster Manual (2000), Monster Manual (2003), Monster Manual (2008), Monster Vault (2010)		
Veteran	Online Supplement 21			
Violet Fungus	Online Supplement 21	Monster Manual (1977), Monstrous Compendium Volume Two (1989), Monstrous Manual (1993), Monster Manual (2000), Monster Manual (2003)		
Will-o'-Wisp	Online Supplement 22	Supplement I: Greyhawk (1975), Monster Manual (1977), Monstrous Compendium Volume One (1989), Monstrous Manual (1993), Monster Manual (2000), Monster Manual (2003), Monster Manual 2 (2009)		
Winged Kobold	Online Supplement 22	Monstrous Compendium Volume One (1989), Monstrous Manual (1993)		
Wyvern	Online Supplement 22	Dungeons & Dragons set (1974), Monster Manual (1977), D&D Expert Set (1981, 1983), Monstrous Compendium Volume One (1989), Dungeons & Dragons Rules Cyclopedia (1991), Monstrous Manual (1993), Monster Manual (2000), Monster Manual (2003), Monster Manual (2008)		
Yuan-ti	Online Supplement 23	Dwellers of the Forbidden City (1981), Monster Manual II (1983), Monstrous Compendium Volume One (1989), Monstrous Manual (1993), Monster Manual (2000), Monster Manual (2003), Monster Manual (2008), Monster Vault (2010)	Yuan-ti Malison, Yuan-ti Pureblood	

== A92180000 – Monster Manual (2014) ==
The Monster Manual is one of the core rulebooks for the Dungeons & Dragons 5th edition, published in 2014. The book features an introduction on pages 4–11, the monster descriptions on pages 12–316, an appendix of Miscellaneous Creatures on pages 317–341, and a second appendix of Nonplayer Characters on pages 342–350.

A list of the monsters by Challenge Rating was not included in the book, and was instead posted on Wizards of the Coast's web site. The list was also provided in the 5th edition Dungeon Master's Guide.

ISBN 978-0-7869-6561-8

Creature	Page	Other Appearances	Variants	Description
Aarakocra	12	Fiend Folio (1981), Monstrous Compendium Volume Two (1989), Monstrous Manual (1993), Monstrous Compendium: Monsters of Faerûn (2001), Dark Sun Creature Catalog (2010)		Type: Humanoid. In 2020, Comic Book Resources counted the aarakocra as # 9 on the list of "10 Powerful Monster Species That You Should Play As", stating that "As long as they're not wearing heavy or medium armor you have a flying sniper, essentially."
Aboleth	13–14	Dwellers of the Forbidden City (1981), Monster Manual II (1983), Monstrous Compendium Volume Two (1989), Monstrous Manual (1993), Monster Manual (2000), Monster Manual (2003), Monster Manual (2008)		Type: Aberration. Ancient and powerful aquatic beings, aboleth in the game use their telepathic powers to influence and enslave mortals from behind the scenes in their bid to restore the position of dominance they lost through the rise of the gods themselves. SyFy Wire contributor Lisa Granshaw included them in her 2018 list of "The 9 Scariest, Most Unforgettable Monsters From Dungeons & Dragons" due to their impressive abilities and vengefulness.
Angels	15–18	Dragon #63 (1982; Deva only), Dragon #64 (1982; Planetar and Solar only), Monster Manual II (1983), Monstrous Compendium – Outer Planes Appendix (1991; as Aasimon), Monstrous Compendium – Planescape Appendix (1994; as Aasimon), Monster Manual (2000; as Celestial), Fiend Folio (2003; Deva only), Monster Manual (2003)	Deva, Planetar, Solar	Type: Celestial. Celestials from the Outer Planes, "charming creatures protecting the universe against evil".
Animated Objects	19–20	Monster Manual (2000), Monster Manual (2003), Hoard of the Dragon Queen (2014, online supplement; Rug of Smothering only)	Animated Armor, Flying Sword, Rug of Smothering	Type: Construct
Ankheg	21	Dragon #5 (1977), Monster Manual (1977), Monstrous Compendium Volume Two (1989), Monstrous Manual (1993), Monster Manual (2000), Monster Manual (2003), Monster Manual 2 (2009)		Type: Monstrosity
Azer	22	Monster Manual II (1983), Practical Planetology (1991), Secrets of the Lamp (1993), Monstrous Compendium Annual Volume One (1994), Monster Manual (2000), Monster Manual (2003), Monster Manual (2008)		Type: Elemental
Banshee	23	Monster Manual (1977), Monstrous Compendium Volume Two (1989), Monstrous Manual (1993), Monster Manual II (2002), Monster Manual (2008; as Wailing Ghost)		Type: Undead. Inspired by Gothic fiction, a typical denizen of the Ravenloft setting.
Basilisk	24	Dungeons & Dragons set (1974), D&D Basic Set (1977), Monster Manual (1977), D&D Expert Set (1981, 1983), D&D Companion Rules (1984), Monstrous Compendium Volume Two (1989), Dungeons & Dragons Rules Cyclopedia (1991), Monstrous Manual (1993), Monster Manual (2000), Monster Manual (2003), Monster Manual (2008), Monster Vault (2010)		Type: Monstrosity. Based on the creature from medieval bestiaries. In the original Monster Manual it is described as a reptilian monster whose gaze can turn creatures to stone. AD&D's basilisk was also adapted into the Magic: The Gathering trading card game, with a depiction taken from the Monster Manual being used in a prototype version.
Behir	25	The Lost Caverns of Tsojcanth (1982), Monster Manual II (1983), Monstrous Compendium Volume One (1989), Monstrous Manual (1993), Monster Manual (2000), Monster Manual (2003), Monster Manual 2 (2009)		Type: Monstrosity
Beholders	26–30	Supplement I: Greyhawk (1975), Monster Manual (1977), The Secret of Bone Hill (1981; Spectator only), Monster Manual II (1983; Spectator only), D&D Companion Rules (1984), Monstrous Compendium Volume One (1989), Monstrous Compendium – Forgotten Realms Appendix (1989; Spectator only), Lost Ships (1990; Death Tyrant only), Dungeons & Dragons Rules Cyclopedia (1991), Monstrous Manual (1993), Monster Manual (2000), Monstrous Compendium: Monsters of Faerûn (2001; Spectator only), Forgotten Realms Campaign Setting (2001; Death Tyrant only), Monster Manual (2003), Lords of Madness: The Book of Aberrations (2005), Monster Manual (2008), Monster Vault (2010), Dungeons & Dragons Starter Set (2014; Spectator only)	Beholder, Death Tyrant, Spectator	Type: Aberration
Blights	31–32	The Sunless Citadel (2000; Twig Blight only), Monster Manual II (2002; Twig Blight only), Fiend Folio (2003; Vine Blight, as Vine Horror, only), Monster Manual (2008; Vine Blight, as Vine Horror, only), Monster Vault: Threats to the Nentir Vale (2011; Twig Blight only), Dungeons & Dragons Starter Set (2014; Twig Blight only)	Needle Blight, Twig Blight, Vine Blight	Type: Plant
Bugbears	33	Supplement I: Greyhawk (1975), D&D Basic Set (1977, 1981, 1983), Monster Manual (1977), Monstrous Compendium Volume One (1989), Dungeons & Dragons Rules Cyclopedia (1991), Monstrous Manual (1993), Monster Manual (2000), Monster Manual (2003), Monster Manual (2008), Monster Vault (2010), Dungeons & Dragons Starter Set (2014)	Bugbear Chief	Type: Humanoid (Goblinoid)
Bulette	34	Dragon #1 (1976), Monster Manual (1977), Monstrous Compendium Volume Two (1989), Monstrous Manual (1993), Monster Manual (2000), Monster Manual (2003), Monster Manual (2008), Monster Vault (2010)		Type: Monstrosity. Also called land shark, inspired by a plastic toy from Hong Kong. In his 2019 book The Monsters Know What They're Doing, author Keith Ammann called bulettes "brutes tailor-made to give your players jump scares" and found its preferences and aversions for the meat of different humanoid races "ludicrous".
Bullywug	35	Fiend Folio (1981), Monstrous Compendium Volume Two (1989), Monstrous Manual (1993), Monstrous Compendium: Monsters of Faerûn (2001), Monster Manual 2 (2009), Hoard of the Dragon Queen (2014, online supplement)		Type: Humanoid
Cambion	36	Monster Manual II (1983), Monstrous Compendium – Outer Planes Appendix (1991), Monstrous Compendium – Planescape Appendix (1994), Expedition to the Demonweb Pits (2007), Monster Manual (2008)		Type: Fiend
Carrion Crawler	37	Supplement I: Greyhawk (1975), D&D Basic Set (1977, 1981, 1983), Monster Manual (1977), Monstrous Compendium Volume One (1989), Dungeons & Dragons Rules Cyclopedia (1991), Monstrous Manual (1993), Monster Manual (2000), Monster Manual (2003), Monster Manual (2008), Monster Vault (2010)		Type: Monstrosity
Centaur	38	Dungeons & Dragons set (1974), Monster Manual (1977), D&D Expert Set (1981, 1983), Monstrous Compendium Volume One (1989), Dungeons & Dragons Rules Cyclopedia (1991), Monstrous Manual (1993), Monster Manual (2000), Monster Manual (2003), Monster Manual 2 (2009)		Type: Monstrosity. Based on the creature from Greek mythology.
Chimera	39	Dungeons & Dragons set (1974), D&D Basic Set (1977), Monster Manual (1977), D&D Expert Set (1981, 1983), Monstrous Compendium Volume One (1989), Dungeons & Dragons Rules Cyclopedia (1991), Monstrous Manual (1993), Monster Manual (2000), Monster Manual (2003), Monster Manual (2008)		Type: Monstrosity. The chimera is based on the chimera of Greek mythology as found in the Iliad by Homer, "stronger than a centaur but weaker than a sphinx". Present in the game since the earliest edition.
Chuul	40	Monster Manual (2000), Monster Manual (2003), Monster Manual (2008)		Type: Aberration
Cloaker	41	Secret of the Slavers Stockade (1981), Monster Manual II (1983), Monstrous Compendium – Forgotten Realms Appendix (1989), Monstrous Manual (1993), Monster Manual (2000), Monster Manual (2003), Monster Manual 3 (2010)		Type: Aberration. An original creation for the game's artificial underground environment, this monster was designed as a trap for unwary player characters; it looks like a living cloak with teeth.
Cockatrice	42	Dungeons & Dragons set (1974), D&D Basic Set (1977), Monster Manual (1977), D&D Expert Set (1981, 1983), D&D Companion Rules (1984), Monstrous Compendium Volume One (1989), Dungeons & Dragons Rules Cyclopedia (1991), Monstrous Manual (1993), Monster Manual (2000), Monster Manual (2003), Monster Manual 2 (2009)		Type: Monstrosity. Based on the creature from medieval bestiaries.
Couatl	43	Supplement III: Eldritch Wizardry (1976), Monster Manual (1977), Monstrous Compendium Volume One (1989), Monstrous Manual (1993), Monster Manual (2000), Monster Manual (2003), Monster Manual 2 (2009)		Type: Celestial. Based on the creature from Mesoamerican religion.
Crawling Claw	44	Dragon #32 (1979), Shadowdale (1989), Monstrous Compendium – Forgotten Realms Appendix (1989), Monstrous Manual (1993), Monstrous Compendium: Monsters of Faerûn (2001), Lost Empires of Faerûn (2005), Open Grave: Secrets of the Undead (2009)		Type: Undead. Screen Rant ranked the crawling claw among the 10 weakest monsters in 2018: "At best, you can use a bunch of them to act as a distraction or as a screen while another villain prepares a spell or trap."
Cyclops	45	Supplement IV: Gods, Demi-Gods & Heroes (1976), Deities & Demigods (1980), D&D Expert Set (1981, 1983), Legends & Lore (1985), Monstrous Compendium Volume Two (1989), Legends & Lore (1990), Dungeons & Dragons Rules Cyclopedia (1991), Monstrous Manual (1993), Deities & Demigods (2002), Shining South (2004), Monster Manual (2008), Monster Vault (2010)		Type: Giant. One-eyed giants based on Greek mythology. Ranked tenth among the ten best mid-level 4th Edition monsters by the authors of Dungeons & Dragons 4th Edition For Dummies.
Darkmantle	46	Monster Manual (2000), Monster Manual (2003), Monster Manual 2 (2009)		Type: Monstrosity
Death Knight	47	Fiend Folio (1981), Monstrous Compendium – Dragonlance Appendix (1990), Monstrous Manual (1993), Monster Manual II (2002), Dragonlance Campaign Setting (2003), Monster Manual (2008), Monster Vault (2010)		Type: Undead.
Demilich	48–49	Tomb of Horrors (1978), Monster Manual II (1983), Monstrous Compendium Volume One (1989), Monstrous Manual (1993), Epic Level Handbook (2002)		Type: Undead. Evolved beyond status as a lich. Creature of enormous powers, where only the skull remains. Tyler Linn of Cracked.com identified the demi-lich as one of "15 Idiotic Dungeons and Dragons Monsters" in 2009, stating: "Besides looking like a Pirates of the Caribbean alarm clock, the Demi-lich seems to possess no tactical advantages of any kind. It just kind of floats around, waiting for a party of heroes to smack it out of the air like a pinata. We suppose it could try to bite you, but the illustration above kind of makes it look like the jaw is fused in place. Man, now we just feel sorry for it." Ranked among the strongest in Screen Rant's "10 Most Powerful (And 10 Weakest) Monsters, Ranked", saying "You might think that a floating skull would be easy to smash to pieces, but you would be wrong, as demiliches are some of the most resilient creatures in the game."
Demons	50–65	Supplement III: Eldritch Wizardry (1976), Monster Manual (1977), Queen of the Demonweb Pits (1980; Yochlol only), Fiend Folio (1981; Shadow Demon only), The Lost Caverns of Tsojcanth (1982; Bar-lgura, Chasme, Dretch only), Monster Manual II (1983; Bar-lgura, Chasme, Dretch, Yochlol only), Dragon #91 (1984; Goristro only), D&D Immortals Rules (1986), Monstrous Compendium Volume One (1989; Quasit only), Drow of the Underdark (1991; Yochlol only), Monstrous Compendium – Ravenloft Appendix (1991; Shadow Fiend only), Monstrous Compendium – Outer Planes Appendix (1991; as Tanar'ri), Wrath of the Immortals (1992), Monstrous Manual (1993; as Tanar'ri, Balor and Marilith only, plus Quasit), Monstrous Compendium – Planescape Appendix (1994; as Tanar'ri), Planes of Chaos (1994; Goristro only), Monstrous Compendium – Planescape Appendix II (1995; Yochlol only), Monstrous Compendium – Ravenloft Appendices I & II (1996; Shadow Fiend only), Monstrous Compendium Annual Three (1996; Goristro only), Villains' Lorebook (1998; Yochlol only), Monster Manual (2000), Monstrous Compendium: Monsters of Faerûn (2001; Yochlol only), Manual of the Planes (2001; Goristro only), Book of Vile Darkness (2002; Manes, Bar-lgura, Chasme, Shadow Demon only), Monster Manual (2003), Fiendish Codex I: Hordes of the Abyss (2006), Monster Manual (2008), Monster Manual 2 (2009; Dretch only), Monster Manual 3 (2010; Quasit only), Monster Vault (2010)	Balor, Barlgura, Chasme, Dretch, Glabrezu, Goristro, Hezrou, Manes, Marilith, Nalfeshnee, Quasit, Shadow Demon, Vrock, Yochlol	Type: Fiend (Demon). Many were based on figures from Christian demonology. Considered among the "standard repertoire of "Monsters"" by Fabian Perlini-Pfister. In a review of Planescape Monstrous Compendium Appendix II for Arcane magazine, the reviewer cites the culture of the tanar'ri as helping "give the Planes a solid base of peoples". Based on and renamed from the Balrog from J.R.R. Tolkien's legendarium.
Devils	66–78	Monster Manual (1977), Dragon #75 (1983; Bearded and Spined only), Monster Manual II (1983; Bearded and Spined only), Monstrous Compendium Volume One (1989; Imp only), Monstrous Compendium – Outer Planes Appendix (1991; as Baatezu), Monstrous Manual (1993; as Baatezu, Pit Fiend only, plus Imp), Monstrous Compendium – Planescape Appendix (1994; as Baatezu), Planes of Law (1995; Chain Devil only, as Kyton), Monstrous Compendium Annual Three (1996; Chain Devil only, as Kyton), Monster Manual (2000), Manual of the Planes (2001; Spined Devil only, as Spinagon), Monster Manual (2003), Fiendish Codex II: Tyrants of the Nine Hells (2006), Monster Manual (2008), Manual of the Planes (2008; Barbed only), Monster Manual 2 (2009; Erinyes only), Monster Vault (2010)	Barbed Devil, Bearded Devil, Bone Devil, Chain Devil, Erinyes, Horned Devil, Ice Devil, Imp, Lemure, Pit Fiend, Spined Devil	Type: Fiend (Devil). Many were based on figures from Christian demonology. The erinyes is based on the figures from Greek mythology. Imps are minor fiends which could be created from larvae. Lemures are among lowest of fiends, these "living piles of rotting flesh that look like puddles of pink skin" are one initial incarnation of evil souls when arriving at the lower planes. Screen Rant reviewer Scott Baird ranked them among the weakest monsters in the game.
Dinosaurs	79–80	Supplement II: Blackmoor (1975; Plesiosaurus only), Monster Manual (1977), D&D Expert Set (1981, 1983; Pteranodon, as Pterodactyl, Triceratops, and Tyrannosaurus Rex only), The Isle of Dread (1981; Allosaurus and Ankylosaurus only), D&D Master Rules (1985), Creature Catalogue (1986; Allosaurus and Ankylosaurus only), Monstrous Compendium – Forgotten Realms Appendix (1989), Dungeons & Dragons Rules Cyclopedia (1991), Creature Catalog (1993; Allosaurus and Ankylosaurus only), Monstrous Manual (1993), Monstrous Compendium Annual Volume Two (1995; Allosaurus and Plesiosaurus only), Monster Manual (2000), Monster Manual II (2002; Allosaurus and Ankylosaurus only), Monster Manual (2003), Monster Manual (2008; Ankylosaurus only, as Macetail Behemoth), Adventurer's Vault (2008; Triceratops, as Trihorn Behemoth)	Allosaurus, Ankylosaurus, Plesiosaurus, Pteranodon, Triceratops, Tyrannosaurus Rex	Type: Beast. Considered among the "standard repertoire of "Monsters"", and among the 12 most underrated monsters, "a creature as large and fearsome as a dragon but without all the hype".
Displacer Beast	81	Supplement I: Greyhawk (1975), D&D Basic Set (1977), Monster Manual (1977), D&D Expert Set (1981, 1983), Monstrous Compendium Volume One (1989), Dungeons & Dragons Rules Cyclopedia (1991), Monstrous Manual (1993), Monster Manual (2000), Monster Manual (2003), Monster Manual (2008), Monster Vault (2010)		Type: Monstrosity. Based on the alien Coeurl from the short story Black Destroyer by A. E. van Vogt. David M. Ewalt, in his book Of Dice and Men, discussed several monsters appearing in the original Monster Manual, describing displacer beasts as looking like "pumas with thorn-covered tentacles growing out of their shoulders". Rob Bricken from io9 named the displacer beast as the 2nd most memorable D&D monster.
Doppelganger	82	Supplement I: Greyhawk (1975), D&D Basic Set (1977, 1981, 1983), Monster Manual (1977), Monstrous Compendium Volume Two (1989), Dungeons & Dragons Rules Cyclopedia (1991), Monstrous Manual (1993), Monster Manual (2000), Monster Manual (2003), Monster Manual (2008), Monster Vault (2010), Dungeons & Dragons Starter Set (2014), Hoard of the Dragon Queen (2014, online supplement)		Type: Monstrosity
Dracolich	83–84	Dragon #110 (1986), Waterdeep and the North (1987), Monstrous Compendium – Forgotten Realms Appendix (1989), Monstrous Manual (1993), Forgotten Realms Campaign Setting (2001), Draconomicon: The Book of Dragons (2003), Monster Manual (2008), Monster Vault (2010)	Adult Blue Dracolich	Type: Undead. Ranked among the strongest monsters in the game by Scott Baird from Screen Rant. It was also one of the first new creatures introduced for the Forgotten Realms campaign setting.
Dragon, Shadow	84–85	Monster Manual II (1983), Monstrous Compendium – Greyhawk Appendix (1990), Monstrous Manual (1993), Monstrous Compendium: Monsters of Faerûn (2001), Draconomicon: The Book of Dragons (2003)	Young Red Shadow Dragon	Type: Dragon. Reviewer Philippe Tessier found the shadow dragon a very dangerous foe in frontal assault.
Dragons	86–118	Dungeons & Dragons set (1974; Black, Blue, Gold, Green, Red, White only), Supplement I: Greyhawk (1975; Brass, Bronze, Copper, Silver only), D&D Basic Set (1977; Black, Brass, Red, White only), Monster Manual (1977), D&D Basic Set (1981, 1983), Monstrous Compendium Volume One (1989), Dungeons & Dragons Rules Cyclopedia (1991), Monstrous Manual (1993), Monster Manual (2000), Monster Manual (2003), Monster Manual (2008), Monster Vault (2010), Dungeons & Dragons Starter Set (2014; Green only), Hoard of the Dragon Queen (2014, online supplement; Blue and White only)	Black Dragon (Ancient, Adult, Young, Wyrmling), Blue Dragon (Ancient, Adult, Young, Wyrmling), Green Dragon (Ancient, Adult, Young, Wyrmling), Red Dragon (Ancient, Adult, Young, Wyrmling), White Dragon (Ancient, Adult, Young, Wyrmling), Brass Dragon (Ancient, Adult, Young, Wyrmling), Bronze Dragon (Ancient, Adult, Young, Wyrmling), Copper Dragon (Ancient, Adult, Young, Wyrmling), Gold Dragon (Ancient, Adult, Young, Wyrmling), Silver Dragon (Ancient, Adult, Young, Wyrmling)	Type: Dragon. Powerful and intelligent, usually winged reptiles with magical abilities and breath weapon. The different subraces, distinguished by their colouring, vary in power. The dragon has been referred to as the "iconic creature for D&D adventurers to conquer".
Dragon Turtle	119	Monster Manual (1977), D&D Expert Set (1981), D&D Companion Rules (1984), Monstrous Compendium Volume One (1989), Dungeons & Dragons Rules Cyclopedia (1991), Monstrous Manual (1993), Monster Manual (2000), Monster Manual (2003)		Type: Dragon. Present in the game since its inception.
Drider	120	Queen of the Demonweb Pits (1980), Monster Manual II (1983), Monstrous Compendium Volume Two (1989), Monstrous Manual (1993), Monster Manual (2000), Monster Manual (2003), Monster Manual (2008), Monster Vault (2010)		Type: Monstrosity
Dryad	121	Dungeons & Dragons set (1974), Monster Manual (1977), D&D Expert Set (1981, 1983), Monstrous Compendium Volume Two (1989), Dungeons & Dragons Rules Cyclopedia (1991), Monstrous Manual (1993), Monster Manual (2000), Monster Manual (2003), Monster Manual (2008), Monster Vault (2010)		Type: Fey. Based on the dryad from classical sources. The dryad appears as a player character class in Tall Tales of the Wee Folk in the "DM's booklet" (1989).
Duergar	122	Monster Manual II (1983), Monstrous Compendium Volume Two (1989), Monstrous Manual (1993), Monster Manual (2000), Monster Manual (2003), Monster Manual 2 (2009), Monster Vault (2010)		Type: Humanoid
Elementals	123–125	Dungeons & Dragons set (1974), Supplement I: Greyhawk (1975), Monster Manual (1977), D&D Expert Set (1981, 1983), Monstrous Compendium Volume One (1989), Dungeons & Dragons Rules Cyclopedia (1991), Monstrous Manual (1993), Monster Manual (2000), Monster Manual (2003), Monster Manual 3 (2010), Monster Vault (2010), Hoard of the Dragon Queen (2014, online supplement; Air only)	Air Elemental, Earth Elemental, Fire Elemental, Water Elemental	Type: Elemental
Elves: Drow	126–129	Hall of the Fire Giant King (1978), Fiend Folio (1981), Monstrous Compendium Volume Two (1989), Monstrous Manual (1993), Monster Manual (2000), Monster Manual (2003), Monster Manual (2008), Monster Vault (2010),	Drow, Drow Elite Warrior, Drow Mage, Drow Priestess of Lolth	Type: Humanoid (Elf). Made famous R. A. Salvatore's Drizzt novels, these dark elves from the game influenced subsequent works of fantasy. Drow have a gender-based caste system that says "a great deal about attitudes towards gender roles in the real world". Bleeding Cool reviewer Gavin Sheehan considered "the schism between drow and other elves" one "of the most contentious relationships in the multiverse" of D&D. A drider is a "monster that looks like a centaur only with the bottom half of a spider instead of a horse."
Empyrean	130	Supplement I: Greyhawk (1975; as Titan), Monster Manual (1977; as Titan), D&D Immortals Rules (1986; as Titan), Monstrous Compendium – Outer Planes Appendix (1991; as Titan), Wrath of the Immortals (1992; as Titan), Monstrous Manual (1993; as Titan), Monster Manual (2000; as Titan), Monster Manual (2003; as Titan)		Type: Celestial. Based on the powerful beings from Greek mythology. Ranked among the strongest creatures in the game by Scott Baird from Screen Rant, as they "stand above giants and possess even more power in terms of their physical and magical capabilities". Backstab reviewer Michaël Croitoriu thought them truly interesting for powergamers when made available as player characters.
Ettercap	131	Fiend Folio (1981), Monstrous Compendium Volume Two (1989), Monstrous Manual (1993), Monster Manual (2000), Monster Manual (2003), Monster Manual (2008), Hoard of the Dragon Queen (2014, online supplement)		Type: Monstrosity
Ettin	132	Monster Manual (1977), Monstrous Compendium Volume Two (1989), Monstrous Manual (1993), Monster Manual (2000), Monster Manual (2003), Monster Manual (2008), Monster Vault (2010)		Type: Giant
Faerie Dragon	133	Dragon #62 (1982), Monster Manual II (1983), Monstrous Compendium – Forgotten Realms Appendix (1989), Monstrous Manual (1993), Draconomicon: The Book of Dragons (2003)		Type: Dragon
Flameskull	134	Dragon #197 (1993), Monstrous Compendium Annual Volume One (1994), Lost Empires of Faerûn (2005), Monster Manual (2008), Dungeons & Dragons Starter Set (2014)		Type: Undead
Flumph	135	Fiend Folio (1981), Monstrous Compendium Annual Volume Two (1995), Dungeon #118 (2005), Fool's Grove (2009)		Type: Aberration. Ranked among the weakest monsters in the game by Scott Baird from Screen Rant: It only attacks with a stinking liquid, and helpless when turned on its back. Shannon Applecline considered "the much-satirized flumph" one of the silly monsters introduced in Fiend Folio.
Fomorian	136	The Lost Caverns of Tsojcanth (1982), Monster Manual II (1983), Monstrous Compendium Volume Two (1989), Monstrous Manual (1993), Monster Manual II (2002), Monster Manual (2008)		Type: Giant
Fungi	137–138	The Strategic Review #3 (1975; Shrieker only), D&D Basic Set (1977, 1981, 1983; Shrieker only), Monster Manual (1977), D&D Companion Rules (1984; Gas Spore only, as Blast Spore), Monstrous Compendium Volume Two (1989), Dungeons & Dragons Rules Cyclopedia (1991; Gas Spore, as Blast Spore, and Shrieker only), Monstrous Manual (1993), Monster Manual (2000), Monster Manual (2003), Lords of Madness: The Book of Aberrations (2005; Gas Spore only), Hoard of the Dragon Queen (2014, online supplement; Violet Fungus only)	Gas Spore, Shrieker, Violet Fungus	Type: Plant. Ben Woodard called D&D's fungi horrific in their variety, not only due to their poisonous nature but their creepy ability to move. Scott Baird from Screen Rant ranked the man-sized shrieker among the weakest monsters in the game, at "the bottom of the mushroom monster food chain": They "can be used as cheap alarm systems for Underdark societies, but they possess no combat abilities of their own. The only thing a shrieker can do is shriek".
Galeb Duhr	139	Monster Cards Set 2 (1982), Monster Manual II (1983), Monstrous Compendium Volume Two (1989), Monstrous Manual (1993), Monster Manual II (2002), Monster Manual (2008)		Type: Elemental
Gargoyle	140	Dungeons & Dragons set (1974), D&D Basic Set (1977, 1981, 1983), Monster Manual (1977), Monstrous Compendium Volume Two (1989), Dungeons & Dragons Rules Cyclopedia (1991), Monstrous Manual (1993), Monster Manual (2000), Monster Manual (2003), Monster Manual (2008), Monster Vault (2010), Hoard of the Dragon Queen (2014, online supplement)		Type: Elemental. AD&D's gargoyle was adapted into the Magic: The Gathering trading card game, with a depiction taken from the Monster Manual being used in a prototype version.
Genies	141–146	Dungeons & Dragons set (1974; Djinni and Efreeti only), D&D Basic Set (1977; Djinni only), Monster Manual (1977; Djinni and Efreeti only), D&D Expert Set (1981, 1983; Djinni and Efreeti only), Dragon #66 (1982; Dao and Marid only), The Lost Caverns of Tsojcanth (1982; Dao and Marid only), Monster Manual II (1983; Dao and Marid only), D&D Companion Rules (1984; Djinni and Efreeti only), Monstrous Compendium Volume One (1989; all but Marid), Monstrous Compendium Volume Two (1989; Marid only), Dungeons & Dragons Rules Cyclopedia (1991; Djinni and Efreeti only), Monstrous Manual (1993), Monster Manual (2000; Djinni and Efreeti only), Monster Manual (2003; Djinni and Efreeti only), Manual of the Planes (2001; Dao and Marid only), Monster Manual (2008; Efreeti only), Monster Manual 2 (2009; Djinni only), Monster Vault (2010; Efreeti only)	Dao, Djinni, Efreeti, Marid	Type: Elemental. Based on notions from Middle Eastern culture, genies in the game are powerful elemental spirits from the Inner Planes, each of the four classical elements having its own subspecies of genie: djinn for air, dao for earth, efreet for fire. The djinn and efreet have namesakes from Arabic folklore also associated with air and fire, respectively. The dao were newly invented for the game altogether to fill the gap for the remaining element. A depiction of an "evil [...] efreet" already appeared in the original Dungeons & Dragons (1974) edition, another "enormous, devilish red" one was the main feature of the cover of the 1st edition Dungeon Master's Guide. Within the game's cosmology they were based on the Plane of Fire, centered around the "fabled City of Brass".
Ghost	147	The Strategic Review #3 (1975), Monster Manual (1977), Palace of the Silver Princess (1981), D&D Companion Rules (1984), Monstrous Compendium Volume One (1989), Dungeons & Dragons Rules Cyclopedia (1991), Monstrous Manual (1993), Monster Manual (2000), Monster Manual (2003), Monster Manual (2008)		Type: Undead. Inspired by Gothic fiction, a typical denizen of the Ravenloft setting.
Ghouls	148	Dungeons & Dragons set (1974), D&D Basic Set (1981, 1983), Monster Manual (1977), Monstrous Compendium Volume One (1989), Dungeons & Dragons Rules Cyclopedia (1991), Monstrous Manual (1993), Monster Manual (2000), Monster Manual (2003), Monster Manual (2008), Monster Vault (2010), Dungeons & Dragons Starter Set (2014)	Ghast, Ghoul	Type: Undead
Giants	149–156	Dungeons & Dragons set (1974; all but Storm), Supplement I: Greyhawk (1975; Storm only), D&D Basic Set (1977), Monster Manual (1977), D&D Expert Set (1981, 1983), Monstrous Compendium Volume One (1989), Dungeons & Dragons Rules Cyclopedia (1991), Monstrous Manual (1993), Monster Manual (2000), Monster Manual (2003), Monster Manual (2008; Hill, Fire, Storm only), Monster Manual 2 (2009; Frost and Stone only), Monster Vault (2010; Fire, Frost, Hill only), Hoard of the Dragon Queen (2014, online supplement; Stone only)	Cloud Giant, Fire Giant, Frost Giant, Hill Giant, Stone Giant, Storm Giant	Type: Giant. Overlarge powerful humanoids with a self-involved social focus, usually presented as the "bad guys". Based on mythological figures and Tolkien, their stone-throwing ability indicates their creative roots in wargaming.
Gibbering Mouther	157	The Hidden Shrine of Tamoachan (1980), Monster Manual II (1983), Dragon #160 (1990), Assassin Mountain (1993), Forgotten Realms Campaign Setting (1993), Monstrous Compendium Annual Volume One (1994), Monster Manual (2000), Monster Manual (2003), Monster Manual (2008)		Type: Aberration. A creature with many eyes and mouths. Witwer et al. found Erol Otus' early depiction "perversely beautiful", the artist's surrealist style very suited for this bizarre monster.
Gith	158–161	Fiend Folio (1981), Monstrous Compendium – Outer Planes Appendix (1991), Monstrous Manual (1993), Monstrous Compendium – Planescape Appendix (1994), Psionics Handbook (2001), Manual of the Planes (2001), Monster Manual (2003), Monster Manual (2008), Monster Vault (2010; Githyanki only)	Githyanki Warrior, Githyanki Knight, Githzerai Monk, Githzerai Zerth	Type: Humanoid (Gith). Githyanki: Xenophobic humanoids with gaunt stature, leathery yellow skin and fangs. Inhabitants of the Astral Plane, and ancient enemies of the githzerai, githyanki are considered to "boast some excellent twists" as non-player characters, but "little more than dextrous, not to mention ugly, egg layers" as PCs by reviewer Trenton Webb Introduced by Charles Stross in White Dwarf No. 12, and officially included in the game in Fiend Folio (1981) and featured on its cover. The name was borrowed the name from a fictional race in George R. R. Martin's Dying of the Light. The githyanki/illithid relationship was inspired by Larry Niven's World of Ptavvs. The githyanki were voted among the top ten best monsters from that White Dwarf's "Fiend Factory" column. Shannon Applecline considered the githyanki one of the game's especially notable monsters. Scott Baird of the website TheGamer commented on the nature of the relationship of the githyanki to the mind flayers, to whom they were formerly enslaved: "Despite their wicked reputation, the Githyanki have an important role to play in protecting the Prime Material Plane. The Githyanki despise Mind Flayers and their armies might be the only thing holding them back. The trailer for Baldur's Gate 3 shows just how scary a single Mind Flayer ship can be, and that could happen a thousand times over if the Githyanki aren't around." ComicBook.com contributor Christian Hoffer considered "the conflict between the otherworldly githzerai and githyanki" one "of the great conflicts that make up the D&D multiverse", and praised the expanded lore presented in Mordenkainen's Tome of Foes as "certainly useful as both inspiration and as research material for building a D&D campaign." Githzerai: Designed by Charles Stross,[39][56]: 38  these humanoids are the ancient and fervent enemies of mind flayers, to whom they were formerly enslaved, and the githyanki; they are based on the plane of Limbo. A playable species in the Planescape campaign setting, reviewer Johnny L. Wilson found them a new take on the niche usually occupied by elves.[60][68][61] Shannon Applecline considered the githzerai one of the game's especially notable monsters,[56]: 38  while ComicBook.com contributor Christian Hoffer counted "the conflict between the otherworldly githzerai and githyanki" among "the great conflicts that make up the D&D multiverse",[66] and praised the expanded lore presented in Mordenkainen's Tome of Foes as "certainly useful as both inspiration and as research material for building a D&D campaign."[67]
Gnolls	162–163	Dungeons & Dragons set (1974), D&D Basic Set (1977, 1981, 1983), Monster Manual (1977), Monstrous Compendium Volume One (1989), Dungeons & Dragons Rules Cyclopedia (1991), Monstrous Manual (1993), Monster Manual (2000), Monster Manual (2003), Monster Manual (2008), Monster Vault (2010)	Gnoll, Gnoll Pack Lord, Gnoll Fang of Yeenoghu	Type: Humanoid (Gnoll). Richard W. Forest assumed them to be inspired from but not resembling the gnoles conceived by Lord Dunsany, while Gary Gygax himself stated that although Dunsany's "gnole" is close", he came up with the name as "a cross between a gnome and a troll", and the description was his original creation. He wanted to create a humanoid opponent in the game to fit in between the hobgoblin and bugbear in power. Gnolls were considered one of the "five main "humanoid" races" in AD&D by Paul Karczag and Lawrence Schick.
Gnome, Deep (Svirfneblin)	164	Shrine of the Kuo-Toa (1978), Fiend Folio (1981), Monstrous Compendium – Forgotten Realms Appendix (1989), Monstrous Manual (1993), Monster Manual (2000), Monster Manual (2003)		Type: Humanoid (Gnome)
Goblins	165–166	Dungeons & Dragons set (1974), D&D Basic Set (1977, 1981, 1983), Monster Manual (1977), Monstrous Compendium Volume One (1989), Dungeons & Dragons Rules Cyclopedia (1991), Monstrous Manual (1993), Monster Manual (2000), Monster Manual (2003), Monster Manual (2008), Monster Vault (2010), Dungeons & Dragons Starter Set (2014)	Goblin, Goblin Boss	Type: Humanoid (Goblin). Based primarily on the goblins portrayed in J.R.R. Tolkien's Middle-Earth. Considered one of the "five main "humanoid" races" in AD&D by Paul Karczag and Lawrence Schick. Presented as "evil" and "predisposed towards a society of brutal regimes where the strongest rule" in the game. Suitable opponent for characters of lowest level.
Golems	167–170	Supplement I: Greyhawk (1975; all but Clay), The Strategic Review #4 (1975; Clay only), Monster Manual (1977), Monstrous Compendium Volume One (1989), Monstrous Manual (1993), Monster Manual (2000), Monster Manual (2003), Monster Manual (2008; Flesh and Stone only), Monster Manual 2 (2009; Clay and Iron only), Monster Vault (2010; all but Clay), Hoard of the Dragon Queen (2014, online supplement; Stone only)	Clay, Flesh, Iron, Stone	Type: Construct. The clay golem is based on the golem of Medieval Jewish folklore, though changed from "a cherished defender to an unthinking hulk" while the flesh golem is related to Frankenstein's monster as Universal's 1931 film, seen in e.g. being empowered by electricity. All golems are inspired by Gothic fiction more generally; a typical denizen of the Ravenloft setting, and "classic" monster of the game. The influence of Dungeons & Dragons has led to the inclusion of golems in other tabletop role-playing as well as in video games.
Gorgon	171	Dungeons & Dragons set (1974), Monster Manual (1977), D&D Expert Set (1981, 1983), D&D Companion Rules (1984), Monstrous Compendium Volume Two (1989), Dungeons & Dragons Rules Cyclopedia (1991), Monstrous Manual (1993), Monster Manual (2000), Monster Manual (2003), Monster Manual (2008)		Type: Monstrosity. "iron plated bull", based on early modern bestiaries, with only the name being derived from the Classical counterpart.
Grell	172	Fiend Folio (1981), Monstrous Compendium – Greyhawk Appendix (1990), Monstrous Compendium – Spelljammer Appendix II (1991), Monstrous Manual (1993), Monster Manual II (2002), Lords of Madness: The Book of Aberrations (2005), Monster Manual (2008)		Type: Aberration. "terrifying beaked, tentacled monsters that populate the realm of Underdark". Tyler Linn of Cracked.com listed the grell among the "15 Most Idiotic Monsters In Dungeons & Dragons History" and found that it's movement by floating contributed to it looking ridiculous.
Grick	173	Monster Manual (2000), Monster Manual (2003), Monster Manual (2008), Dungeons & Dragons Starter Set (2014)	Grick, Grick Alpha	Type: Monstrosity
Griffon	174	Dungeons & Dragons set (1974), D&D Basic Set (1977), Monster Manual (1977), D&D Expert Set (1981, 1983), Monstrous Compendium Volume Two (1989), Dungeons & Dragons Rules Cyclopedia (1991), Monstrous Manual (1993), Monster Manual (2000), Monster Manual (2003), Monster Manual (2008), Hoard of the Dragon Queen (2014, online supplement)		Type: Monstrosity
Grimlock	175	Fiend Folio (1981), Monstrous Compendium – Fiend Folio Appendix (1992), Monstrous Manual (1993), Monster Manual (2000), Monster Manual (2003), Monster Manual (2008)		Type: Humanoid (Grimlock)
Hags	176–179	Supplement II: Blackmoor (1975; Sea Hag only), Monster Manual (1977), Monster Manual II (1983; Green Hag only), D&D Master Rules (1985; Sea Hag only), Dungeons & Dragons Rules Cyclopedia (1991; Sea Hag only), Monstrous Compendium Volume Two (1989; all but Night Hag), Monstrous Compendium – Outer Planes Appendix (1991; Night Hag only), Monstrous Manual (1993), Monstrous Compendium – Planescape Appendix (1994; Night Hag only), Monster Manual (2000), Monster Manual (2003), Monster Manual (2008; Night Hag only), Monster Vault (2010; all but Sea Hag)	Green Hag, Night Hag, Sea Hag	Type: Fey. Based on the pervasive figure from folklore, with "different interpretations of the monster around the world" being worked into different variants in the game, allowing each "a little more personality". In the view of Stag and Trammel, hags in D&D represent misogynistic and ageist tendencies in their authors. SyFy Wire in 2018 called it one of "The 9 Scariest, Most Unforgettable Monsters From Dungeons & Dragons", saying that "There are endless horrific possibilities when it comes to hags." The night hag is a powerful hag from Hades, propagating evil by creating larvae. Don Turnbull referred to the night hag as "splendid" and notes that the illustration of the night hag is the best drawing in the book. It has been described as comparable to the Alp of folklore, although "considered a more Judeo-Christian demonic influence".
Half-Dragon	180	Council of Wyrms (1994), Monstrous Compendium Annual Volume Two (1995), Monster Manual (2000), Monster Manual (2003)	Half-Red Dragon Veteran	Type: Humanoid
Harpy	181	Supplement I: Greyhawk (1975), D&D Basic Set (1977, 1981, 1983), Monster Manual (1977), Monstrous Compendium Volume One (1989), Dungeons & Dragons Rules Cyclopedia (1991), Monstrous Manual (1993), Monster Manual (2000), Monster Manual (2003), Monster Manual (2008)		Type: Monstrosity. Based on the creature from Greek mythology. Michael Witwer et al. observed this presentation of the harpy as "redesigned from previous editions to entice more Dungeon Master use" with "an artistic facelift."
Hell Hound	182	Supplement I: Greyhawk (1975), D&D Basic Set (1977), Monster Manual (1977), D&D Expert Set (1981, 1983), Dungeons & Dragons Rules Cyclopedia (1991), Monstrous Compendium Volume Two (1989), Monstrous Manual (1993), Monster Manual (2000), Monster Manual (2003), Monster Manual (2008)		Type: Fiend
Helmed Horror	183	Halls of the High King (1990), Forgotten Realms Campaign Setting (1993), Monstrous Compendium Annual Volume One (1994), Monstrous Compendium: Monsters of Faerûn (2001), Lost Empires of Faerûn (2005), Monster Manual (2008), Hoard of the Dragon Queen (2014, online supplement)		Type: Construct
Hippogriff	184	Dungeons & Dragons set (1974), D&D Basic Set (1977), Monster Manual (1977), D&D Expert Set (1981, 1983), Monstrous Compendium Volume Two (1989), Dungeons & Dragons Rules Cyclopedia (1991), Monstrous Manual (1993), Monster Manual (2000), Monster Manual (2003), Monster Manual (2008)		Type: Monstrosity. Originally based on the creature from Persian mythology the adapted hippogriff "was among the earliest fantasy beasts introduced into the Dungeons & Dragons universe": An artistic representation drawing inspiration from real eagles and horses was used for the cover of the third booklet of the original Dungeons & Dragons (1974) edition and became one of "the game's earlies ambassadors" through use of that cover in advertisments. Gary Gygax used a story in which he received a letter asking how many eggs a Hippogriff could lay as an example of the encyclopedic knowledge which fans expected him to have over every detail of gameplay.
Hobgoblin	185–187	Dungeons & Dragons set (1974), D&D Basic Set (1977, 1981, 1983), Monster Manual (1977), Monstrous Compendium Volume One (1989), Dungeons & Dragons Rules Cyclopedia (1991), Monstrous Manual (1993), Monster Manual (2000), Monster Manual (2003), Monster Manual (2008), Monster Vault (2010), Dungeons & Dragons Starter Set (2014), Hoard of the Dragon Queen (2014, online supplement)	Hobgoblin, Hobgoblin Captain, Hobgoblin Warlord	Type: Humanoid (Goblin)
Homunculus	188	Supplement I: Greyhawk (1975), Monster Manual (1977), Monstrous Compendium Volume One (1989), Monstrous Manual (1993), Monster Manual (2000), Monster Manual (2003)		Type: Construct
Hook Horror	189	Fiend Folio (1981), Quest for the Heartstone (1984), Creature Catalogue (1986), Monstrous Compendium – Greyhawk Appendix (1990), Creature Catalog (1993), Monstrous Manual (1993), Monster Manual II (2002), Monster Manual (2008)		Type: Monstrosity. The hook horror was first published in White Dwarf #12 (April–May 1979), and was originally submitted by Ian Livingstone. It was voted among the top ten monsters from the magazine's "Fiend Factory" column and reprinted in Best of White Dwarf Articles (1980). Ed Greenwood, in his review of the Fiend Folio for Dragon magazine, considered the hook horror as one of the creatures with "strange appearances and little else; there is no depth to their listings" and that it was one of the creatures which "seem incomplete". Michael Witwer et al. observed this presentation of the hook horror as "redesigned from previous editions to entice more Dungeon Master use" with "an artistic facelift."
Hydra	190	Dungeons & Dragons set (1974), D&D Basic Set (1977), Monster Manual (1977), D&D Expert Set (1981, 1983), Monstrous Compendium Volume One (1989), Dungeons & Dragons Rules Cyclopedia (1991), Monstrous Manual (1993), Monster Manual (2000), Monster Manual (2003), Monster Manual (2008), Monster Vault (2010)		Type: Monstrosity. Based on the creature from classical sources, with Heracles' famed method of slaying it adapted into a vulnerability against fire, but not with the less well-known poisonous bite, showing how the game mostly focusses on the well-known traits of mythological creatures. Present in the game since its inception. AD&D's hydra was also adapted into the Magic: The Gathering trading card game, with a depiction taken from the Monster Manual being used in a prototype version.
Intellect Devourer	191	Supplement III: Eldritch Wizardry (1976), Monster Manual (1977), The Complete Psionics Handbook (1991), Monstrous Manual (1993), Psionics Handbook (2001), Expanded Psionics Handbook (2004), Monster Manual 3 (2010)		Type: Aberration. SyFy Wire in 2018 called it one of "The 9 Scariest, Most Unforgettable Monsters From Dungeons & Dragons", saying that "The idea of having your brain consumed and just becoming an evil puppet is truly terrible."
Invisible Stalker	192	Dungeons & Dragons set (1974), Monster Manual (1977), D&D Expert Set (1981, 1983), D&D Companion Rules (1984), Monstrous Compendium Volume Two (1989), Dungeons & Dragons Rules Cyclopedia (1991), Monstrous Manual (1993), Monster Manual (2000), Monster Manual (2003)		Type: Elemental
Jackalwere	193	Monster Manual (1977), Monstrous Compendium Volume One (1989), Monstrous Manual (1993), Fiend Folio (2003), Monster Manual 3 (2010)		Type: Humanoid. An intelligent jackal with the ability to assume human and jackal-human-hybrid form and a sleep-inducing gaze.
Kenku	194	Fiend Folio (1981), Monstrous Compendium Volume Two (1989), Monstrous Manual (1993), Monster Manual III (2004), Monster Manual 2 (2009)		Type: Humanoid. Crow-like humanoids with a tendency for thievery, loosely based on the Japanese tengu.
Kobold	195	Dungeons & Dragons set (1974), D&D Basic Set (1977, 1981, 1983), Monster Manual (1977), Monstrous Compendium Volume One (1989), Dungeons & Dragons Rules Cyclopedia (1991), Monstrous Manual (1993), Monster Manual (2000), Monster Manual (2003), Monster Manual (2008), Monster Vault (2010), Hoard of the Dragon Queen (2014, online supplement)	Winged Kobold, Kobold	Type: Humanoid (Kobold). "[S]hort subterranean lizard-men", considered one of the "five main "humanoid" races" in AD&D by Paul Karczag and Lawrence Schick, and ranked among the weakest monsters in the game by Scott Baird from Screen Rant.
Kraken	196–197	Monster Manual II (1983), Creature Catalogue (1986), Monstrous Compendium Volume Two (1989), Creature Catalog (1993), Monstrous Manual (1993), Monster Manual (2000), Monster Manual (2003), Monster Manual 3 (2010)		Type: Monstrosity
Kuo-toa	198–200	Shrine of the Kuo-Toa (1978), Fiend Folio (1981), Monstrous Compendium Volume Two (1989), Monstrous Manual (1993), Monster Manual (2000), Monster Manual (2003), Monster Manual (2008)	Kuo-toa, Kuo-toa Archpriest, Kuo-toa Whip	Type: Humanoid (Kuo-toa). "evil fish-men"
Lamia	201	Monster Manual (1977), Creature Catalogue (1986; as Lamara), Creature Catalog (1993; as Lamara), Monstrous Compendium Volume Two (1989), Monstrous Manual (1993), Monster Manual (2000), Monster Manual (2003)		Type: Monstrosity
Lich	202–203	Supplement I: Greyhawk (1975), Monster Manual (1977), D&D Master Rules (1985), Dungeons & Dragons Rules Cyclopedia (1991), Monstrous Compendium Volume One (1989), Monstrous Manual (1993), Monster Manual (2000), Monster Manual (2003), Monster Manual (2008), Monster Vault (2010)		Type: Undead. Emaciated undead spellcaster, a "classic" monster of the game.
Lizardfolk	204–205	Supplement I: Greyhawk (1975), D&D Basic Set (1977, 1981, 1983), Monster Manual (1977), Fiend Folio (1981; Lizard King only), Monstrous Compendium Volume One (1989), Dungeons & Dragons Rules Cyclopedia (1991), Monstrous Manual (1993), Monster Manual (2000), Monster Manual (2003), Serpent Kingdoms (2004; Lizard King/Queen only), Monster Manual (2008), Monster Vault (2010), Hoard of the Dragon Queen (2014, online supplement)	Lizardfolk, Lizardfolk Shaman, Lizard King/Queen	Type: Humanoid (Lizardfolk). A player character race in some settings. Reviewer Chris Gigoux described them by saying "Lizard Men aren't bad, [...] they're just a simple folks, struggling to survive." In 2020, Comic Book Resources counted the lizardfolk as # 1 on the list of "10 Powerful Monster Species That You Should Play As", stating that "Along with the ability to manufacture their own weapons from the natural environment around them, they provide an excellent role-playing experience and have some pretty awesome tricks up their sleeve." An image of a lizard man by Greg Bell functioned as the logo in the early phase of TSR Hobbies, while "the bloodied bodies of lizard men" overcome by a group of adventurers featured on the cover of the 1st edition Player's Handbook, considered "arguably the most iconic piece of art in all of RPGdom" by Reactor magazine commentator Saladin Ahmed.
Lycanthropes	206–211	Dungeons & Dragons set (1974; all but Wererat), Supplement I: Greyhawk (1975; Wererat only), D&D Basic Set (1977, 1981, 1983), Monster Manual (1977), Monstrous Compendium Volume One (1989; all but Wereboar), Monstrous Compendium Volume Two (1989; Wereboar only), Dungeons & Dragons Rules Cyclopedia (1991), Monstrous Manual (1993), Monster Manual (2000), Monster Manual (2003), Monster Manual (2008; Wererat and Werewolf only), Monster Manual 2 (2009; Wereboar and Weretiger only), Monster Vault (2010; Wererat and Werewolf only)	Werebear, Wereboar, Wererat, Weretiger, Werewolf	Type: Humanoid (Shapechanger). Afflicted shapechangers, whose condition could be transmitted like a disease; some available as player character races. Depiction of the werewolf is related to those in 1930s and 1940s Hollywood movies like The Wolf Man. Ranked sixth among the ten best low-level monsters by the authors of Dungeons & Dragons For Dummies: "a classic monster", interesting due to shapechanging because "players can never be entirely sure whether that surly villager might indeed be the great black wolf who attacked their characters out in the forest." The presence of lyncanthropes in the gaming system is one of the elements that has led Christian fundamentalists to condemn Dungeons & Dragons and to associate it with the occult. Screen Rant has described the operation of lycanthropy in the game as an aspect that "makes no sense" because it is often a positive development for a character. "It is possible for a character to be infected with lycanthropy in Dungeons & Dragons and it comes highly recommended, as the benefits outweigh the negatives". It notes that "[i]n exchange for learning how to control your condition, you gain Damage Reduction, +2 to your Wisdom stat, the Scent ability, Low-Light Vision, a new Hit Dice, the Iron Will feat, and the ability to transform into a more powerful form". An illustration in one edition of the Monster Manual implied that the beast in Disney's Beauty and the Beast was a lycanthrope, with a creature having a resemblance to the Beast attacking a human resembling that film's antagonist, Gaston. Present in the game since its inception, an image of a werewolf's face by Gygax' childhood friend Tom Keogh was "[a]lmost certainly the oldest piece of art" in the original D&D.
Magmin	212	In the Dungeons of the Slave Lords (1981; as Magman), Monster Manual II (1983; as Magman), Planescape Campaign Setting (1994; as Magman), Monster Manual (2000), Monster Manual (2003)		Type: Elemental
Manticore	213	Dungeons & Dragons set (1974), D&D Basic Set (1977), Monster Manual (1977), D&D Expert Set (1981, 1983), Monstrous Compendium Volume One (1989), Dungeons & Dragons Rules Cyclopedia (1991), Monstrous Manual (1993), Monster Manual (2000), Monster Manual (2003), Monster Manual (2008), Monster Vault (2010)		Type: Monstrosity. Based on its mythological counterpart, including the barbed tail, the manticore appeared in the game from its earliest edition.
Medusa	214	Dungeons & Dragons set (1974), D&D Basic Set (1977, 1981, 1983), Monster Manual (1977), D&D Companion Rules (1984), Monstrous Compendium Volume One (1989), Dungeons & Dragons Rules Cyclopedia (1991), Monstrous Manual (1993), Monster Manual (2000), Monster Manual (2003), Monster Manual (2008), Monster Vault (2010)		Type: Monstrosity. Based on the creature from classical sources but translated into species of monsters originated from "humans seeking eternal youth". Reviewer Allan Rausch found their portrayal as "a woman with snakes for hair" up to 2nd edition less compelling than their less human-like depiction in 3rd edition. Part of the game from its very beginning, a medusa was already depicted in the playtest material from 1973 for the original edition.
Mephits	215–217	Fiend Folio (1981; Magma, as Lava, Smoke, and Steam only), Eye of the Serpent (1984; Ice only), Greyhawk Ruins (1990; all but Dust and Mud), Monstrous Compendium – Fiend Folio Appendix (1992; all but Dust and Mud), Monstrous Compendium – Planescape Appendix (1994), Monster Manual (2000; all but Smoke), Monster Manual (2003; all but Smoke), Dragon #374 (2009; Ice only)	Dust Mephit, Ice Mephit, Magma Mephit, Mud Mephit, Smoke Mephit, Steam Mephit	Type: Elemental. First published in White Dwarf #13 (June/July 1979) under the names of fire imp, molten imp, smoke imp and steam imp, respectively (not including ice and mist mephits), originally submitted by M. Stollery. These "imps" were voted among the top ten monsters from the magazine's "Fiend Factory" column in 1980.
Merfolk	218	Dungeons & Dragons set (1974), Supplement II: Blackmoor (1975), Monster Manual (1977), D&D Expert Set (1981, 1983), Monstrous Compendium Volume Two (1989), Dungeons & Dragons Rules Cyclopedia (1991), Monstrous Manual (1993), Monster Manual (2000), Monster Manual (2003)		Type: Humanoid (Merfolk)
Merrow	219	Monster Manual II (1983), Monstrous Compendium Volume One (1989), Monstrous Manual (1993)		Type: Monstrosity
Mimic	220	Monster Manual (1977), Monstrous Compendium Volume Two (1989), Monstrous Manual (1993), Monster Manual (2000), Monster Manual (2003), Monster Manual 3 (2010)		Type: Monstrosity. An original creation for the game's artificial underground environment, this "iconic monster" looks like a treasure chest and is designed as a trap for unwary player characters. Michael Witwer et al. observed this presentation of the mimic as "redesigned from previous editions to entice more Dungeon Master use" with "an artistic facelift."
Mind Flayer	221–222	The Strategic Review #1 (1975), Supplement III: Eldritch Wizardry (1976), Monster Manual (1977), Monstrous Compendium Volume One (1989), Monstrous Manual (1993), Monster Manual (2000), Monster Manual (2003), Monster Manual (2008), Monster Vault (2010)		Type: Aberration. "Squid-headed humanoids", considered one of "the game's signature monsters" by Philip J. Clements. Reviewer Julien Blondel described them as vile brain-eating creatures full of psionic energy. He found them delightful creatures for a sadistic Dungeon Master to use, and a useful bridge between classic game worlds and the planes, as illithids abound in both.
Minotaur	223	Dungeons & Dragons set (1974), D&D Basic Set (1977, 1981, 1983), Monster Manual (1977), Monstrous Compendium Volume One (1989), Dungeons & Dragons Rules Cyclopedia (1991), Monstrous Manual (1993), Monster Manual (2000), Monster Manual (2003), Monster Manual (2008), Monster Vault (2010)		Type: Monstrosity. Based on the creature from Greek mythology, but translated from a singular creature into a species. In 2021, Comic Book Resources counted the minotaur as one of the "7 Underused Monster Races in Dungeons & Dragons", stating that "far from just brutal monsters. Many are lawful by nature, which means, surprisingly, Minotaurs make for some good Paladins. They also, obviously, make for some good Barbarians, Monks and Fighters. There's a lot of potential with Minotaurs. People hate and fear them, but you might be able to play that to your advantage...or fight against the stereotypes." The minotaur was among the monsters featured as trading cards on the back of Amurol Products candy figure boxes. AD&D's minotaurs were also adapted into the Magic: The Gathering trading card game, with a depiction taken from the Monster Manual being used in a prototype version.
Modrons	224–226	Monster Manual II (1983), Planescape Campaign Setting (1994), Manual of the Planes (2001, web enhancement), Dragon #354 (2007), Dungeon #186 (2011)	Monodrone, Duodrone, Tridrone, Quadrone, Pentadrone	Type: Construct. In his review of the Planescape Campaign Setting boxed set, Gene Alloway mentioned the modrons as an example of "the old, tired and previously foolish" which the set "breathes new life and meaning into". Reviewer Scott Haring found that the "once-silly Modrons" from 1st edition AD&D were "given a new background and purpose that makes a lot more sense" in 2nd edition Planescape. Philippe Tessier praised the modrons as charming little critters.
Mummies	227–229	Dungeons & Dragons set (1974), D&D Basic Set (1977), Monster Manual (1977), D&D Expert Set (1981, 1983), Monstrous Compendium Volume One (1989), Dungeons & Dragons Rules Cyclopedia (1991), Monstrous Manual (1993), Monster Manual (2000), Monster Manual (2003), Monster Manual (2008), Monster Vault (2010)	Mummy, Mummy Lord	Type: Undead. Based on the creature from Gothic fiction and appearances in more contemporary entertainment, a typical denizen of the Ravenloft setting. In his review of the Monster Manual in the British magazine White Dwarf #8 (August/September 1978), Don Turnbull noted that the mummy was revised from its previous statistics, and could now cause paralysis on sight (as a result of fear).
Myconids	230–232	In the Dungeons of the Slave Lords (1981), Monster Manual II (1983), Monstrous Compendium Volume Two (1989), Monstrous Manual (1993), Monster Manual II (2002), Monster Manual 2 (2008)	Myconid Sprout, Quaggoth Spore Servant, Myconid Adult, Myconid Sovereign	Type: Plant. A "race of [man-sized] sentient fungus creatures", "some of which pack a mean punch", and which have the "ability to spray poisons that can disable their foes".
Nagas	233–234	The Strategic Review #3 (1975), Supplement IV: Gods, Demi-Gods & Heroes (1976), D&D Basic Set (1977), Monster Manual (1977), D&D Expert Set (1981, 1983), Monstrous Compendium Volume Two (1989), Dungeons & Dragons Rules Cyclopedia (1991), The Ruins of Myth Drannor (1993; Bone only), Monstrous Manual (1993), Monstrous Compendium Annual Volume One (1994; Bone only), Monster Manual (2000), Monster Manual II (2002; Bone only), Monster Manual (2003), Serpent Kingdoms (2004; Bone only), Monster Manual (2008), Monster Vault (2010)	Bone Naga, Spirit Naga, Guardian Naga	Type: Monstrosity. Based on the nāga from Indian mythology.
Nightmare	235	Monster Manual (1977), Creature Catalogue (1986), Monstrous Compendium – Outer Planes Appendix (1991), Creature Catalog (1993), Monstrous Manual (1993), Monstrous Compendium – Planescape Appendix (1994), Monster Manual (2000), Monster Manual (2003), Monster Manual (2008)		Type: Fiend
Nothic	236	Miniatures Handbook (2003), Monster Manual 2 (2009), Dungeons & Dragons Starter Set (2014)		Type: Aberration
Ogre	237–238	Dungeons & Dragons set (1974), D&D Basic Set (1977, 1981, 1983), Monster Manual (1977), Fiend Folio (1981; Ogrillon only), Monstrous Compendium Volume One (1989), Greyhawk Ruins (1990; Ogrillon only), Dungeons & Dragons Rules Cyclopedia (1991), Monstrous Manual (1993), Monster Manual (2000), Dungeon #83 (2000; Ogrillon only), Monster Manual (2003), Monster Manual (2008), Monster Vault (2010), Dungeons & Dragons Starter Set (2014), Hoard of the Dragon Queen (2014, online supplement)	Ogre, Half-Ogre (Ogrillon)	Type: Giant. Large, powerful humanoid creatures, with slightly below average intelligence. Typical bad guys in the game, who can be used to teach "players about fighting big, powerful, stupid monsters, which is an iconic D&D experience".
Oni	239	Supplement I: Greyhawk (1975; as Ogre Mage), Monster Manual (1977; as Ogre Mage), Monstrous Compendium Volume Two (1989; as Ogre Mage), Monstrous Manual (1993; as Ogre Mage), Monster Manual (2000; as Ogre Mage), Monster Manual (2003; as Ogre Mage), Monster Manual (2008)		Type: Giant
Oozes	240–243	Dungeons & Dragons set (1974), D&D Basic Set (1977), Monster Manual (1977), D&D Basic Set (1981, 1983; all but Black Pudding), D&D Expert Set (1981, 1983; Black Pudding only), Monstrous Compendium Volume One (1989), Dungeons & Dragons Rules Cyclopedia (1991), Monstrous Manual (1993), Monster Manual (2000), Monster Manual (2003), Monster Manual (2008; Ochre Jelly and Gelatinous Cube only), Monster Manual 2 (2009; Black Pudding only), Monster Vault (2010; all but Gray Ooze), Dungeons & Dragons Starter Set (2014; Ochre Jelly only), Hoard of the Dragon Queen (2014, online supplement; Gray Ooze only)	Black Pudding, Gelatinous Cube, Gray Ooze, Ochre Jelly	Type: Ooze. "D&D's large variety of monstrous oozes and slimes took their original inspiration from Irvin S. Yeathworth Jr's The Blob" movie. In the artificial dungeon environment of the game, they function as a "clean up crew". The gelatinous cube, "a living mound of gelatinous jelly", was considered especially suited for that role, as it fit exactly in the standard grid for tactical combat. Considered an "iconic monster"; Michael Witwer et al. observed this presentation of it as "redesigned from previous editions to entice more Dungeon Master use" with "an artistic facelift." Ian Livingstone considered the ochre jelly one of the game's more "exotic and strange creatures". SyFy Wire contributor Lisa Granshaw counted oozes among "The 9 Scariest, Most Unforgettable Monsters From Dungeons & Dragons" and found them "extremely disturbing because everything may seem fine one minute and then the next you're on the way to death." D&D's slimes have served as inspiration for appearances of this kind of monster in many video games.
Orcs	244–247	Dungeons & Dragons set (1974), D&D Basic Set (1977, 1981, 1983), Monster Manual (1977), Monstrous Compendium Volume One (1989), Dungeons & Dragons Rules Cyclopedia (1991), Monstrous Manual (1993), Monster Manual (2000), Monster Manual (2003), Monster Manual (2008), Monster Vault (2010), Dungeons & Dragons Starter Set (2014), Hoard of the Dragon Queen (2014, online supplement)	Orc, Orc War Chief, Orc Eye of Gruumsh, Orog	Type: Humanoid (Orc). Directly adapted from the orc in J.R.R. Tolkien's works. Considered one of the "five main "humanoid" races" in AD&D by Paul Karczag and Lawrence Schick. Presented as "evil" and "savage raiders" in the game.
Otyugh	248	Monster Manual (1977), Monstrous Compendium Volume Two (1989), Monstrous Manual (1993), Monster Manual (2000), Monster Manual (2003), Monster Manual (2008), Monster Vault (2010), Hoard of the Dragon Queen (2014, online supplement)		Type: Aberration. Michael Witwer et al. observed this presentation of the otyugh as "redesigned from previous editions to entice more Dungeon Master use" with "an artistic facelift."
Owlbear	249	Supplement I: Greyhawk (1975), D&D Basic Set (1977, 1981, 1983), Monster Manual (1977), Monstrous Compendium Volume One (1989), Dungeons & Dragons Rules Cyclopedia (1991), Monstrous Manual (1993), Monster Manual (2000), Monster Manual (2003), Monster Manual (2008), Monster Vault (2010), Dungeons & Dragons Starter Set (2014)		Type: Monstrosity. Newly created for the game early on inspired by a Hong Kong–made plastic toy, the owlbear was well-received as a useful and memorable monster.
Pegasus	250	Dungeons & Dragons set (1974), D&D Basic Set (1977), Monster Manual (1977), D&D Expert Set (1981, 1983), Monstrous Compendium Volume One (1989), Dungeons & Dragons Rules Cyclopedia (1991), Monstrous Manual (1993), Monster Manual (2000), Monster Manual (2003)		Type: Celestial. Taken from greek mythology, an example of the diverse cultures amalgamated into D&D. Part of the game from its very beginning, a pegasus was already depicted in the playtest material from 1973 for the original edition.
Peryton	251	Monster Manual (1977), Monstrous Compendium – Forgotten Realms Appendix II (1991), Monstrous Manual (1993), Monstrous Compendium: Monsters of Faerûn (2001), Monster Vault: Threats to the Nentir Vale (2011), Hoard of the Dragon Queen (2014, online supplement)		Type: Monstrosity
Piercer	252	The Strategic Review #3 (1975), Monster Manual (1977), Monstrous Compendium Volume One (1989), Monstrous Manual (1993)		Type: Monstrosity
Pixie	253	Dungeons & Dragons set (1974), D&D Basic Set (1977, 1981, 1983), Monster Manual (1977), Monstrous Compendium Volume Two (1989), Dungeons & Dragons Rules Cyclopedia (1991), Monstrous Manual (1993), Monster Manual (2000), Monster Manual (2003)		Type: Fey
Pseudodragon	254	Monster Manual (1977), Monstrous Compendium Volume One (1989), Monstrous Manual (1993), Monster Manual (2000), Monster Manual (2003), Monster Manual (2008), Monster Vault (2010), Player's Handbook (2014)		Type: Dragon. "a miniature dragon that also has a tail stinger" Reviewer Philippe Tessier found it "very nice" and interesting when made available as a familiar.
Purple Worm	255	Dungeons & Dragons set (1974), D&D Basic Set (1977), Monster Manual (1977), D&D Expert Set (1981, 1983), Monstrous Compendium Volume Two (1989), Dungeons & Dragons Rules Cyclopedia (1991), Monstrous Manual (1993), Monster Manual (2000), Monster Manual (2003), Monster Manual (2008), Monster Vault (2010)		Type: Monstrosity. The "dread purple worm" attacks with both ends, maw and stinger. This "iconic monster" and original creation of Dungeons & Dragons is present all editions of the game.
Quaggoth	256	Fiend Folio (1981), Monstrous Compendium – Fiend Folio Appendix (1992), Monstrous Manual (1993), Monstrous Compendium: Monsters of Faerûn (2001), Drow of the Underdark (2007)		Type: Humanoid
Rakshasa	257	The Strategic Review #5 (1975), Supplement IV: Gods, Demi-Gods & Heroes (1976), Monster Manual (1977), Monstrous Compendium Volume One (1989), Monstrous Manual (1993), Monster Manual (2000), Monster Manual (2003), Monster Manual (2008), Monster Vault (2010)		Type: Fiend. Based on the creature from Hindu mythology. Humanoid fiends with tigerlike-features, Reactor magazine commentator Saladin Ahmed rated them as "ultimate badass monsters". He found a depiction sitting with pipe and smoking-jacket fitting on second thought, as the creature is so powerful it has no need to prove its dangerousness.
Remorhaz	258	Dragon #2 (1976), Monster Manual (1977), Monstrous Compendium Volume One (1989), Monstrous Manual (1993), Monster Manual (2000), Monster Manual (2003), Monster Manual 2 (2009)	Young Remorhaz, Remorhaz	Type: Monstrosity
Revenant	259	Fiend Folio (1981), Monstrous Compendium – Forgotten Realms Appendix (1989), Monstrous Manual (1993), Monstrous Compendium: Monsters of Faerûn (2001)		Type: Undead
Roc	260	Dungeons & Dragons set (1974), Monster Manual (1977), D&D Expert Set (1981, 1983), Monstrous Compendium Volume Two (1989), Dungeons & Dragons Rules Cyclopedia (1991), Monstrous Manual (1993), Monster Manual (2000), Monster Manual (2003), Monster Manual (2008)		Type: Monstrosity. An enormous bird, based on a mythological creature probably of Persian origin, known from Sindbad the Sailor.
Roper	261	The Strategic Review #2 (1975), Monster Manual (1977), Quest for the Heartstone (1984), Creature Catalogue (1986), Monstrous Compendium Volume Two (1989), Creature Catalog (1993), Monstrous Manual (1993), Monster Manual (2000), Monster Manual (2003), Monster Manual (2008), Monster Vault (2010), Hoard of the Dragon Queen (2014, online supplement)		Type: Monstrosity. A dangerous inhabitant of the Underdark with "murderous behavior". One of the original creations for the game, Witwer et al. rated them among the "iconic D&D monsters".
Rust Monster	262	Supplement I: Greyhawk (1975), D&D Basic Set (1977, 1981, 1983), Monster Manual (1977), Monstrous Compendium Volume Two (1989), Dungeons & Dragons Rules Cyclopedia (1991), Monstrous Manual (1993), Monster Manual (2000), Monster Manual (2003), Monster Manual 2 (2009), Monster Vault (2010)		Type: Monstrosity. Large armored tick-like monster which devours metals. An original invention for the game and its artificial underground world, the appearance of the rust monster was inspired by a plastic toy from Hong Kong. It was ranked among the most memorable as well as obnoxious creatures in the game, terrifying to certain characters and their players not due to their ability to fight but to destroy their items. Chris Sims of the on-line magazine Comics Alliance referred to the rust monster as "the most feared D&D monster".
Sahuagin	263–264	Supplement II: Blackmoor (1975), Monster Manual (1977), Creature Catalogue (1986; as Shark-kin), Monstrous Compendium Volume One (1989), Creature Catalog (1993; as Shark-kin), Monstrous Manual (1993), Monster Manual (2000), Monster Manual (2003), Monster Manual (2008)	Sahuagin, Sahuagin Priestess, Sahuagin Baron	Type: Humanoid (Sahuagin)
Salamanders	265–266	Supplement I: Greyhawk (1975), Monster Manual (1977), D&D Expert Set (1981, 1983), Fiend Folio (1981; Fire Snake only), D&D Companion Rules (1984), Monstrous Compendium Volume Two (1989), Dungeons & Dragons Rules Cyclopedia (1991), Monstrous Manual (1993), Monster Manual (2000), Monster Manual (2003), Monster Manual (2008)	Fire Snake, Salamander	Type: Elemental
Satyr	267	Supplement IV: Gods, Demi-Gods & Heroes (1976), Monster Manual (1977), Monstrous Compendium Volume One (1989), Monstrous Manual (1993), Monster Manual (2000), Monster Manual (2003), Monster Manual (2008)		Type: Fey. Based on the satyr from classical sources.
Scarecrow	268	Fiend Folio (1981), Monstrous Compendium – Greyhawk Appendix (1990), Monstrous Manual (1993), Dungeon #84 (2001), Dragon #355 (2007), Monster Manual 3 (2010)		Type: Construct
Shadow	269	Supplement I: Greyhawk (1975), D&D Basic Set (1977, 1981, 1983), Monster Manual (1977), Monstrous Compendium Volume One (1989), Dungeons & Dragons Rules Cyclopedia (1991), Monstrous Manual (1993), Monster Manual (2000), Monster Manual (2003), Monster Manual 3 (2010)		Type: Undead. Rob Bricken of io9 identified the shadow as one of "The 12 Most Obnoxious Dungeons & Dragons Monsters".
Shambling Mound	270	The Strategic Review #3 (1975), Monster Manual (1977), Monstrous Compendium Volume Two (1989), Monstrous Manual (1993), Monster Manual (2000), Monster Manual (2003), Monster Manual (2008), Hoard of the Dragon Queen (2014, online supplement)		Type: Plant. Ben Woodard considered its ability to move "the base creepiness of the creep".
Shield Guardian	271	Monster Manual (2000), Monster Manual (2003), Monster Manual (2008)		Type: Construct
Skeletons	272–273	Dungeons & Dragons set (1974), D&D Basic Set (1977, 1981, 1983), Monster Manual (1977), Monstrous Compendium Volume One (1989), Dungeons & Dragons Rules Cyclopedia (1991), Monstrous Manual (1993), Monster Manual (2000), Monster Manual (2003), Monster Manual (2008), Monster Vault (2010), Dungeons & Dragons Starter Set (2014), Player's Handbook (2014)	Skeleton, Minotaur Skeleton, Warhorse Skeleton	Type: Undead. The skeleton was ranked second among the ten best low-level monsters by the authors of Dungeons & Dragons For Dummies: "introduces players to the special advantages and weaknesses of undead monsters". They also thank Ray Harryhausen for people knowing what fighting skeletons ought to look like. Screen Rant ranked the tiny skeleton one of the weakest D&D creatures, saying "[skeletons] go all the way down to Tiny-sized creatures, which means that it is possible for your party of adventurers to fight a group of skeletons that are the same size as action figures."
Slaadi	274–278	Fiend Folio (1981), Monstrous Compendium – Outer Planes Appendix (1991), Monstrous Compendium – Planescape Appendix (1994), Monster Manual (2000), Monster Manual (2003), Monster Manual (2008)	Red Slaad, Slaad Tadpole, Blue Slaad, Green Slaad, Gray Slaad, Death Slaad	Type: Aberration. Ed Greenwood considered the slaadi "worthy additions to any campaign". GameSpy author Allan Rausch described the slaadi as "remorseless reptilian killing machines", but "For many years, slaad were a joke -- because of their artwork", which showed them as "six-foot tall carnivorous frogs". With the Planescape setting they "were reinterpreted artistically to be less frog-like and much more fearsome". Shannon Applecline considered the githzerai one of the game's especially notable monsters.
Specter	279	Dungeons & Dragons set (1974), D&D Basic Set (1977), Monster Manual (1977), D&D Expert Set (1981, 1983), Fiend Folio (1981; Poltergeist), D&D Companion Rules (1984; Poltergeist), Monstrous Compendium Volume One (1989), Monstrous Compendium Volume Two (1989; Poltergeist), Dungeons & Dragons Rules Cyclopedia (1991), Monstrous Manual (1993), Monster Manual (2000), Monster Manual (2003), Monster Manual (2008), Hoard of the Dragon Queen (2014, online supplement)	Specter, Poltergeist	Type: Undead. Inspired by Gothic fiction, a typical denizen of the Ravenloft setting.
Sphinxes	280–282	Supplement IV: Gods, Demi-Gods & Heroes (1976), Monster Manual (1977), D&D Master Rules (1985), Monstrous Compendium Volume Two (1989), Dungeons & Dragons Rules Cyclopedia (1991), Monstrous Manual (1993), Monster Manual (2000), Monster Manual (2003), Monster Manual (2008)	Androsphinx, Gynosphinx	Type: Monstrosity. Based on Egyptian and Classical mythology, an example of the diverse cultures amalgamated into D&D.
Sprite	283	Monster Manual (1977), D&D Basic Set (1981, 1983), Monstrous Compendium Volume One (1989), Monstrous Manual (1993), Monster Manual (2000), Monster Manual (2003), Player's Handbook (2014)		Type: Fey
Stirge	284	Supplement I: Greyhawk (1975), D&D Basic Set (1977, 1981, 1983), Monster Manual (1977), Monstrous Compendium Volume Two (1989), Dungeons & Dragons Rules Cyclopedia (1991), Monstrous Manual (1993), Monster Manual (2000), Monster Manual (2003), Monster Manual (2008), Monster Vault (2010), Dungeons & Dragons Starter Set (2014), Hoard of the Dragon Queen (2014, online supplement)		Type: Beast. Flying and blood-sucking creatures. "[P]esky" because while small they are dangerous to characters as a swarm. Present in the game since its earliest edition.
Succubus/Incubus	284–285	Supplement III: Eldritch Wizardry (1976), Monster Manual (1977), D&D Immortals Rules (1986; as Whispering Demon), Monstrous Compendium – Outer Planes Appendix (1991; as Tanar'ri), Wrath of the Immortals (1992; as Whispering Lesser Fiend), Monstrous Compendium – Planescape Appendix (1994; as Tanar'ri), Monster Manual (2000; as Demon), Monster Manual (2003; as Demon), Monster Manual (2008; as Devil), Monster Vault (2010; as Devil)		Type: Fiend. Typical example of a demon, belonging to the "standard repertoire of "Monsters"", and one of those contributing to the moral panic; also an instance of the sexist tropes the game draws on which presented female sexuality as inherently dangerous. Rob Bricken of io9 identified the succubus as one of "The 12 Most Obnoxious Dungeons & Dragons Monsters".
Tarrasque	286–287	Monster Manual II (1983), Monstrous Compendium Volume Two (1989), Monstrous Manual (1993), Monster Manual (2000), Monster Manual (2003), Monster Manual (2008)		Type: Monstrosity. Ranked among the strongest monsters in the game by Scott Baird from Screen Rant, "the ultimate challenge for many players". Rob Bricken from io9 named the tarrasque as the 10th most memorable D&D monster. The tarrasque appeared on the 2018 Screen Rant top list at No. 5 on " Dungeons & Dragons: The 20 Most Powerful Creatures, Ranked", and Scott Baird highlighted that "The tarrasque is currently the most powerful creature in the 5th edition of Dungeons & Dragons, where it is matched only by Tiamat in terms of its combat prowess."
Thri-Kreen	288	Monster Cards Set 2 (1982), Monster Manual II (1983), Monstrous Compendium – Forgotten Realms Appendix (1989), Monstrous Manual (1993), Dark Sun Monstrous Compendium Appendix II: Terrors Beyond Tyr (1995), Monster Manual II (2002), Monster Manual 3 (2010), Spelljammer: Adventures in Space (2022)		Type: Humanoid (Thri-Kreen). "Praying mantis man" with four arms and a poisonous bite, "invented by Paul Reiche III for the AD&D Monster Cards Set 2 (1982)", reviewer Mark Theurer considered them an "old personal favorite". With their additional limbs and specialized chatkcha and gythka weapons, thri-kreen were infamous as player characters optimized to do extreme amounts of damage. J.R. Zambrano found them "an interesting race" and preferred their "2nd Edition aesthetic" to others.
Treant	289	Dungeons & Dragons set (1974), Monster Manual (1977), D&D Expert Set (1981, 1983), Monstrous Compendium Volume One (1989), Dungeons & Dragons Rules Cyclopedia (1991), Monstrous Manual (1993), Monster Manual (2000), Monster Manual (2003), Monster Manual (2008), Monster Vault (2010)		Type: Plant. Based on the Ent by J. R. R. Tolkien, and renamed due to copyright reasons.
Troglodyte	290	Monster Manual (1977), D&D Basic Set (1981, 1983), Monstrous Compendium Volume Two (1989), Dungeons & Dragons Rules Cyclopedia (1991), Monstrous Manual (1993), Monster Manual (2000), Monster Manual (2003), Monster Manual (2008), Monster Vault (2010), Hoard of the Dragon Queen (2014, online supplement)		Type: Humanoid (Troglodyte). Based on the stock character of the primitive caveman, Gary Gygax portrayed the troglodyte in the game as more monstrous, with chaotic and evil behaviour, offensive smell and lizard-like characteristics. The troglodyte was among the monsters featured as trading cards on the back of Amurol Products candy figure boxes.
Troll	291	Dungeons & Dragons set (1974), D&D Basic Set (1977), Monster Manual (1977), D&D Expert Set (1981, 1983), Monstrous Compendium Volume One (1989), Dungeons & Dragons Rules Cyclopedia (1991), Monstrous Manual (1993), Monster Manual (2000), Monster Manual (2003), Monster Manual (2008), Monster Vault (2010), Hoard of the Dragon Queen (2014, online supplement)		Type: Giant. Tall green-skinned evil gaunt humanoids. A characteristic denizen of AD&D worlds. Their appearance and powerful regenerative ability is taken from Three Hearts and Three Lions by Poul Anderson rather than from their mythological or Tolkienesque counterparts. Considered one of the "five main "humanoid" races" in AD&D by Paul Karczag and Lawrence Schick.
Umber Hulk	292	Supplement I: Greyhawk (1975), Monster Manual (1977), Creature Catalogue (1986; as Hulker), Monstrous Compendium Volume One (1989), Dungeons & Dragons Rules Cyclopedia (1991), Creature Catalog (1993; as Hulker), Monstrous Manual (1993), Monster Manual (2000), Monster Manual (2003), Monster Manual (2008), Monster Vault (2010)		Type: Monstrosity. Present in the game since the earliest edition.
Unicorn	293–294	Dungeons & Dragons set (1974), D&D Basic Set (1977), Monster Manual (1977), D&D Expert Set (1981, 1983), Monstrous Compendium Volume One (1989), Dungeons & Dragons Rules Cyclopedia (1991), Monstrous Manual (1993), Monster Manual (2000), Monster Manual (2003), Monster Manual (2008)		Type: Celestial. Based on the creature from medieval bestiaries. The Dungeons & Dragons animated series featured Uni the unicorn as a well-received "mascot" and "cute animal sidekick".
Vampires	295–298	Dungeons & Dragons set (1974), Supplement I: Greyhawk (1975), D&D Basic Set (1977), Monster Manual (1977), D&D Expert Set (1981, 1983), Monstrous Compendium Volume One (1989), Dungeons & Dragons Rules Cyclopedia (1991), Monstrous Manual (1993), Monster Manual (2000), Monster Manual (2003), Monster Manual (2008), Monster Vault (2010), Hoard of the Dragon Queen (2014, online supplement)	Vampire, Vampire Spawn	Type: Undead. Depiction is related to those in 1930s and 1940s Hollywood Dracula movies, as well as folklore and Gothic fiction; a typical denizen of the Ravenloft setting, and "classic" monster of the game.
Water Weird	299	Monster Manual (1977), Monstrous Compendium Volume Two (1989), Monstrous Manual (1993), Monster Manual II (2002)		Type: Elemental. An "old personal favorite" of reviewer Mark Theurer.
Wight	300	Dungeons & Dragons set (1974), D&D Basic Set (1977, 1981, 1983), Monster Manual (1977), Monstrous Compendium Volume One (1989), Dungeons & Dragons Rules Cyclopedia (1991), Monstrous Manual (1993), Monster Manual (2000), Monster Manual (2003), Monster Manual (2008)		Type: Undead. Thin humanoid undead. Directly adapted from the barrow-wight in Tolkien's The Lord of the Rings, while the concept is inspired Icelandic sagas. Rob Bricken of io9 identified the wight as one of "The 12 Most Obnoxious Dungeons & Dragons Monsters".
Will-o'-Wisp	301	Supplement I: Greyhawk (1975), Monster Manual (1977), Monstrous Compendium Volume One (1989), Monstrous Manual (1993), Monster Manual (2000), Monster Manual (2003), Monster Manual 2 (2009), Hoard of the Dragon Queen (2014, online supplement)		Type: Undead
Wraith	302	Dungeons & Dragons set (1974), D&D Basic Set (1977), Monster Manual (1977), D&D Expert Set (1981, 1983), Monstrous Compendium Volume One (1989), Dungeons & Dragons Rules Cyclopedia (1991), Monstrous Manual (1993), Monster Manual (2000), Monster Manual (2003), Monster Manual (2008), Monster Vault (2010)		Type: Undead. Inspired by and renamed from the Nazgul from J.R.R. Tolkien's legendarium, as well as by Gothic fiction, a typical denizen of the Ravenloft setting.
Wyvern	303	Dungeons & Dragons set (1974), Monster Manual (1977), D&D Expert Set (1981, 1983), Monstrous Compendium Volume One (1989), Dungeons & Dragons Rules Cyclopedia (1991), Monstrous Manual (1993), Monster Manual (2000), Monster Manual (2003), Monster Manual (2008), Hoard of the Dragon Queen (2014, online supplement)		Type: Dragon. Its tail is equipped with a poisonous tail stinger.
Xorn	304	Monster Manual (1977), Monstrous Compendium Volume Two (1989), Monstrous Manual (1993), Monster Manual (2000), Monster Manual (2003), Monster Manual 2 (2009)		Type: Elemental
Yeti	305–306	The Strategic Review #3 (1975), Monster Manual (1977), Monstrous Compendium Volume One (1989), Monstrous Manual (1993), Oriental Adventures (2001), Frostburn (2004), Monster Manual 3 (2010)	Yeti, Abominable Yeti	Type: Monstrosity
Yuan-ti	307–310	Dwellers of the Forbidden City (1981), Monster Manual II (1983), Monstrous Compendium Volume One (1989), Monstrous Manual (1993), Monster Manual (2000), Monster Manual (2003), Monster Manual (2008), Monster Vault (2010), Hoard of the Dragon Queen (2014, online supplement; all but Abomination)	Yuan-ti Abomination, Yuan-ti Malison, Yuan-ti Pureblood	Type: Monstrosity, Humanoid. A species of "cult-like snake people" and among "D&D's most popular and iconic monsters". The original yuan-ti castes were the abominations, the halfbreeds, and the purebloods, which first appeared in the module Dwellers of the Forbidden City (1981), In the adventure, the characters are hired to find an object taken to a lost oriental-style city, which has been taken over by a cult of snake-worshipers, the yuan-ti, and their servants, the mongrelmen and tasloi. The types have been summarized by A.V. Club as "a human-eating snake, or human-snake hybrid eater of humans and snakes, or other human-snake hybrids." Snakes and snake-worship used in fiction have been criticized as characteristic of Orientalism. The publication history, digital and print, of yuan-ti falls into this pattern as they serve as uncomplicated antagonists in "exotic" settings. Graeme Barber, a game designer noted for his critique of racism in Dungeons & Dragons, used yuan-ti in his contribution to the book Candlekeep Mysteries. Controversy arose after Wizards of the Coast, according to Barber, altered his depiction of yuan-ti. Summarizing his critique of the simplistic portrayal, Barber wrote, "Yuan-ti are evil because evil." Keith Ammann, in his 2019 book The Monsters Know What They're Doing, commented of the yuan-ti purebloods that "Yuan-ti have had hundreds of generations to live and adapt on their own, so they'll have the same self-preservation instinct as any evolved species." TheGamer.com in April 2021 listed the yuan-ti pureblood as #2 on their list of "10 Most Underrated Races That Are Better Than You Think". CBR.com listed the yuan-ti pure blood as #5 on their list of "Top 10 Playable Species In D&D".
Yugoloths	311–314	Vault of the Drow (1978; Mezzoloth, as Mezzodaemon, and Nycaloth, as Nycadaemon, only), Fiend Folio (1981; Mezzoloth, as Mezzodaemon, and Nycaloth, as Nycadaemon, only), Monster Manual II (1983; Arcanaloth, as Arcanadaemon, and Ultroloth, as Ultrodaemon), Monstrous Compendium – Outer Planes Appendix (1991), Monstrous Compendium – Planescape Appendix (1994), Manual of the Planes (2001; all but Arcanaloth), Monster Manual II (2002; Arcanaloth only), Monster Manual III (2004; all but Arcanaloth),	Arcanaloth, Mezzoloth, Nycaloth, Ultroloth	Type: Fiend (Yugoloth)
Zombies	315–316	Dungeons & Dragons set (1974), D&D Basic Set (1977, 1981, 1983), Monster Manual (1977), Monstrous Compendium Volume One (1989), Dungeons & Dragons Rules Cyclopedia (1991), Monstrous Manual (1993), Monster Manual (2000), Monster Manual (2003), Monster Manual (2008), Monster Vault (2010), Dungeons & Dragons Starter Set (2014), Player's Handbook (2014)	Zombie, Ogre Zombie, Beholder Zombie	Type: Undead. Based on the zombie from folklore as well as more contemporary entertainment.
Ape	317			Type: Beast
Awakened Shrub	317			Type: Plant
Awakened Tree	317			Type: Plant
Axe Beak	317	Monster Manual (1977), Monstrous Compendium – Forgotten Realms Appendix (1989), Monstrous Compendium Annual Volume Two (1995), Arms and Equipment Guide (2003)		Type: Beast
Baboon	318			Type: Beast
Badger	318			Type: Beast
Bat	318	Player's Handbook (2014)		Type: Beast
Black Bear	318	Player's Handbook (2014)		Type: Beast
Blink Dog	318	Supplement I: Greyhawk (1975), D&D Basic Set (1977), Monster Manual (1977), D&D Expert Set (1981, 1983), Monstrous Compendium Volume One (1989), Dungeons & Dragons Rules Cyclopedia (1991), Monstrous Manual (1993), Monster Manual (2000), Monster Manual (2003)		Type: Fey
Blood Hawk	319	Fiend Folio (1981), Monstrous Compendium Volume Two (1989), Monstrous Manual (1993), Fiend Folio (2003)		Type: Beast
Boar	319	Player's Handbook (2014)		Type: Beast
Brown Bear	319	Player's Handbook (2014)		Type: Beast
Camel	320			Type: Beast
Cat	320	Player's Handbook (2014)		Type: Beast
Constrictor Snake	320	Player's Handbook (2014)		Type: Beast
Crab	320			Type: Beast
Crocodile	320	Player's Handbook (2014), Hoard of the Dragon Queen (2014, online supplement)		Type: Beast
Death Dog	321	Fiend Folio (1981), Monstrous Compendium Volume One (1989), Monstrous Manual (1993)		Type: Monstrosity. White Dwarf reviewer Jamie Thomson commented on the death dog, which is "rumored to be a descendant of Cerberus".
Deer	321	Hoard of the Dragon Queen (2014, online supplement)		Type: Beast
Dire Wolf	321	Monster Manual (1977), D&D Basic Set (1981, 1983), Monstrous Compendium Volume One (1989), Dungeons & Dragons Rules Cyclopedia (1991), Monstrous Manual (1993), Monster Manual (2000), Monster Manual (2003), Monster Manual (2008), Monster Vault (2010), Player's Handbook (2014)		Type: Beast
Draft Horse	321			Type: Beast
Eagle	322			Type: Beast
Elephant	322			Type: Beast
Elk	322	Hoard of the Dragon Queen (2014, online supplement)		Type: Beast
Flying Snake	322			Type: Beast
Frog	322	Player's Handbook (2014)		Type: Beast
Giant Ape	323			Type: Beast
Giant Badger	323			Type: Beast
Giant Bat	323			Type: Beast. The giant bat is exactly what its name would suggest—a giant form of bat with a 6' wingspan. White Dwarf reviewer Jamie Thomson commented on the giant bat, noting that it "seems an obvious choice for D&D".
Giant Boar	323			Type: Beast
Giant Centipede	323	Hoard of the Dragon Queen (2014, online supplement)		Type: Beast
Giant Constrictor Snake	324			Type: Beast
Giant Crab	324			Type: Beast
Giant Crocodile	324			Type: Beast
Giant Eagle	324	Monster Manual (1977), Creature Catalogue (1986), Monstrous Compendium Volume Two (1989), Creature Catalog (1993), Monstrous Manual (1993), Monster Manual (2000), Monster Manual (2003), Player's Handbook (2014)		Type: Beast
Giant Elk	325			Type: Beast
Giant Fire Beetle	325	Supplement II: Blackmoor (1975), D&D Basic Set (1977, 1981, 1983), Monster Manual (1977), Monstrous Compendium Volume Two (1989), Dungeons & Dragons Rules Cyclopedia (1991), Monstrous Manual (1993), Monster Manual (2000), Monster Manual (2003), Monster Manual (2008)		Type: Beast
Giant Frog	325	Supplement II: Blackmoor (1975), Monster Manual (1977), Monstrous Compendium Volume Two (1989), Monstrous Manual (1993), Return to the Temple of Elemental Evil (2001), Hoard of the Dragon Queen (2014, online supplement)		Type: Beast
Giant Goat	326			Type: Beast
Giant Hyena	326			Type: Beast
Giant Lizard	326	Hoard of the Dragon Queen (2014, online supplement)		Type: Beast
Giant Octopus	326			Type: Beast
Giant Owl	327	Monster Manual (1977), Creature Catalogue (1986), Monstrous Compendium Volume One (1989), Creature Catalog (1993), Monstrous Manual (1993), Monster Manual (2000), Monster Manual (2003)		Type: Beast
Giant Poisonous Snake	327			Type: Beast
Giant Rat	327		Giant Rat, Diseased Giant Rats	Type: Beast
Giant Scorpion	327			Type: Beast. Scorpions have the distinction of having been the very first combat encounter in the first playtest, run by Gary Gygax, of the original version of the game. Scorpion the size of a horse, its stinger carries a deadly poison.
Giant Sea Horse	328			Type: Beast
Giant Shark	328			Type: Beast
Giant Spider	328	Dungeons & Dragons Starter Set (2014), Player's Handbook (2014), Hoard of the Dragon Queen (2014, online supplement)		Type: Beast
Giant Toad	329			Type: Beast
Giant Vulture	329			Type: Beast
Giant Wasp	329			Type: Beast
Giant Weasel	329			Type: Beast
Giant Wolf Spider	330			Type: Beast
Goat	330			Type: Beast
Hawk	330			Type: Beast
Hunter Shark	330			Type: Beast
Hyena	331			Type: Beast
Jackal	331			Type: Beast
Killer Whale	331			Type: Beast
Lion	331	Player's Handbook (2014)		Type: Beast
Lizard	332			Type: Beast
Mammoth	332	Monster Manual (1977), Monstrous Compendium Volume One (1989), Monstrous Manual (1993), Frostburn (2004)		Type: Beast
Mastiff	332	Player's Handbook (2014)		Type: Beast
Mule	333	Player's Handbook (2014)		Type: Beast
Octopus	333			Type: Beast
Owl	333	Player's Handbook (2014)		Type: Beast
Panther	333	Player's Handbook (2014)		Type: Beast
Phase Spider	334	Supplement I: Greyhawk (1975), Monster Manual (1977), Monstrous Compendium Volume One (1989), Monstrous Manual (1993), Monster Manual (2000), Monster Manual (2003), Monster Manual 2 (2009)		Type: Monstrosity. Arachnid as big as a medium-large dog that can shift between dimensions and bite with fangs of deadly poison.
Poisonous Snake	334	Player's Handbook (2014)		Type: Beast
Polar Bear	334		Polar Bear, Cave Bear	Type: Beast
Pony	335			Type: Beast
Quipper	335	Fiend Folio (1981), Monstrous Manual (1993)		Type: Beast
Rat	335	Player's Handbook (2014)		Type: Beast
Raven	335	Player's Handbook (2014)		Type: Beast
Reef Shark	336	Player's Handbook (2014)		Type: Beast
Rhinoceros	336			Type: Beast
Riding Horse	336	Player's Handbook (2014)		Type: Beast
Saber-Toothed Tiger	336	D&D Basic Set (1981, 1983), Monstrous Compendium Volume One (1989; as Smilodon), Dungeons & Dragons Rules Cyclopedia (1991), Monstrous Manual (1993; as Smilodon), Frostburn (2004)		Type: Beast
Scorpion	337			Type: Beast
Sea Horse	337			Type: Beast
Spider	337			Type: Beast
Swarm of Bats	337			Type: Beast
Swarm of Insects	338	Hoard of the Dragon Queen (2014, online supplement)	Swarm of Insects, Swarm of Beetles, Swarm of Centipedes, Swarm of Spiders, Swarm of Wasps	Type: Beast
Swarm of Poisonous Snakes	338			Type: Beast
Swarm of Quippers	338			Type: Beast
Swarm of Rats	339	Hoard of the Dragon Queen (2014, online supplement)		Type: Beast
Swarm of Ravens	339			Type: Beast
Tiger	339	Player's Handbook (2014)		Type: Beast
Vulture	339			Type: Beast
Warhorse	340	Player's Handbook (2014)		Type: Beast
Weasel	340			Type: Beast
Winter Wolf	340–341	Monster Manual (1977), Monstrous Compendium Volume One (1989), Monstrous Manual (1993), Monster Manual (2000), Monster Manual (2003), Monster Manual 2 (2009)		Type: Monstrosity
Wolf	341	Dungeons & Dragons Starter Set (2014), Player's Handbook (2014)		Type: Beast
Worg	341	Monster Manual (1977), Monstrous Compendium Volume One (1989), Monstrous Manual (1993), Monster Manual (2000), Monster Manual (2003), Monster Manual (2008)		Type: Monstrosity. Worgs are giant wolves inspired by the wargs in the works of J.R.R. Tolkien; the name was changed for legal reasons, while both word an concept ultimately go back to Old Norse idea of varg, which can refer to wolves in their violent aspect.
Acolyte	342	Hoard of the Dragon Queen (2014, online supplement)		Type: Humanoid
Archmage	342			Type: Humanoid
Assassin	343	Hoard of the Dragon Queen (2014, online supplement)		Type: Humanoid
Bandit	343–344	Hoard of the Dragon Queen (2014, online supplement)	Bandit, Pirate	Type: Humanoid
Bandit Captain	344		Bandit Captain, Pirate Captain	Type: Humanoid
Berserker	344	Hoard of the Dragon Queen (2014, online supplement)		Type: Humanoid
Commoner	345	Dungeons & Dragons Starter Set (2014), Hoard of the Dragon Queen (2014, online supplement)		Type: Humanoid
Cultist	345	Dungeons & Dragons Starter Set (2014), Hoard of the Dragon Queen (2014, online supplement)		Type: Humanoid
Cult Fanatic	345			Type: Humanoid
Druid	346			Type: Humanoid
Gladiator	346–347			Type: Humanoid
Guard	347	Hoard of the Dragon Queen (2014, online supplement)		Type: Humanoid
Knight	347	Hoard of the Dragon Queen (2014, online supplement)		Type: Humanoid
Mage	347	Hoard of the Dragon Queen (2014, online supplement)		Type: Humanoid
Noble	348	Hoard of the Dragon Queen (2014, online supplement)		Type: Humanoid
Priest	348	Hoard of the Dragon Queen (2014, online supplement)		Type: Humanoid
Scout	349	Hoard of the Dragon Queen (2014, online supplement)		Type: Humanoid
Spy	349	Hoard of the Dragon Queen (2014, online supplement)		Type: Humanoid
Thug	350			Type: Humanoid
Tribal Warrior	350			Type: Humanoid
Veteran	350	Hoard of the Dragon Queen (2014, online supplement)		Type: Humanoid

== A96070000 – The Rise of Tiamat (2014) ==
The Rise of Tiamat is the second adventure module for the 5th edition Dungeons & Dragons line, following Hoard of the Dragon Queen. It contains statistics for some of the monsters described in the module in Appendix A; the rest are in an online supplement.

ISBN 978-0-7869-6565-6

Creature	Page	Other Appearances	Variants	Description
Troll	30, Online Supplement 24	Dungeons & Dragons set (1974), D&D Basic Set (1977), Monster Manual (1977), D&D Expert Set (1981, 1983), Fiend Folio (1981; Ice Troll), Monstrous Compendium Volume One (1989), Dungeons & Dragons Rules Cyclopedia (1991), Monstrous Compendium – Fiend Folio Appendix (1992; Ice Troll), Monstrous Manual (1993), Monster Manual (2000), Dragon #301 (2002; Ice Troll), Unapproachable East (2003; Ice Troll), Monster Manual (2003), Monster Manual (2008), Monster Vault (2010), Monster Manual (2014)	Ice Troll	
Animated Tile Creature	42			
Dragonclaw	89	Hoard of the Dragon Queen (2014)		
Dragonfang	89			
Dragonsoul	89			
Dragonwing	90	Hoard of the Dragon Queen (2014)		
Guard Drake	90	Monster Manual (2008), Monster Vault (2010), Hoard of the Dragon Queen (2014)		
Ice Toad	90	Monster Manual (1977), Frostburn (2004)		
Naergoth Bladelord	90–91			
Neronvain	91			
Rath Modar	91	Hoard of the Dragon Queen (2014)		
Severin	92			
Tiamat	92–93	Greyhawk set (1975) (as the Chromatic Dragon), Monster Manual (1977), Dragon #38 (1980), Monster Mythology (1992), Polyhedron #73 (1992), Dragon #272 (2000), Manual of the Planes (2001), Deities and Demigods (2002), Miniatures Handbook (2003) (Aspect of Tiamat), Draconomicon: Chromatic Dragons (2008)		

== B24360000 – Princes of the Apocalypse (2015) ==
Princes of the Apocalypse is the third adventure module for the 5th edition Dungeons & Dragons line. It contains statistics for some of the monsters described in the module in Chapter 7; the rest are in an online supplement.

ISBN 978-0-7869-6578-6

Creature	Page	Other Appearances	Variants	Description
Howling Hatred Cultists	189–193		Feathergale Knight, Howling Hatred Initiate, Howling Hatred Priest, Hurricane, Skyweaver, Thurl Merosska, Windharrow, Aerisi Kalinoth	
Black Earth Cultists	194–199		Black Earth Guard, Black Earth Priest, Burrowshark, Sacred Stone Monk, Stonemelder, Hellenrae, Miraj Vizann, Marlos Urnrayle	
Eternal Flame Cultists	200–203		Eternal Flame Guardian, Eternal Flame Priest, Flamewrath, Razerblast, Bastian Thermandar, Elizar Dryflagon, Vanifer	
Crushing Wave Cultists	204–209		Crushing Wave Priest, Crushing Wave Reaver, Dark Tide Knight, Fathomer, One-Eyed Shiver, Shoalar Quanderil, Gar Shatterkeel	
Drannin Splithelm	209			
Ghald	209–210			
Grumink the Renegade	210–211			
Oreioth	211			
Wiggan Nettlebee	211			
Elemental Myrmidons	212–213		Air Elemental Myrmidon, Earth Elemental Myrmidon, Fire Elemental Myrmidon, Water Elemental Myrmidon	
Princes of Elemental Evil	214–221	Fiend Folio (1981), Planescape Monstrous Compendium Appendix III (1998), Dragon #347 (2006), Monster Manual 3 (2010; Imix and Ogrémoch only)	Imix, Ogrémoch, Olhydra, Yan-C-Bin	

== B24390000 – Out of the Abyss (2015) ==
Out of the Abyss is the fourth adventure module for the 5th edition Dungeons & Dragons line. It contains statistics for the new monsters described in the module in Appendix C, and statistics for Demon Lords in Appendix D.

ISBN 978-0-7869-6581-6

Creature	Page	Other Appearances	Variants	Description
Derro	224–225	The Lost Caverns of Tsojcanth (1982), Monster Manual II (1983), Greyhawk Ruins (1990), Monstrous Manual (1993), Monster Manual (2000), Monster Manual (2003), Monster Manual 3 (2010)	Derro Savant	
Ixitxachitl	225–226	Supplement II: Blackmoor (1975), Monster Manual (1977), D&D Master Rules (1985; as Devilfish), Monstrous Compendium Volume One (1989), Dungeons & Dragons Rules Cyclopedia (1991; as Devilfish), Monstrous Manual (1993), Monster Manual II (2002), Demonomicon (2010)	Ixitxachitl, Vampiric Ixitxachitl, Ixitxachitl Cleric	An "old personal favorite" of reviewer Mark Theurer.
Duergar	226–228		Duergar Darkhaft, Duergar Kavalrachni, Duergar Keeper of the Flame, Duergar Soulblade, Duergar Stone Guard, Duergar Xarrorn	"the infamous dark dwarves", an "evil and avaricious" dwarven subrace with psionic powers. ComicBook.com contributor Christian Hoffer considered the struggle of the duergar with their dwarven cousins one "of the great conflicts that make up the D&D multiverse". Backstab reviewer Michaël Croitoriu found the duergar interesting as a player character option.
Spore Servants	228–229		Chuul Spore Servant, Drow Spore Servant, Duergar Spore Servant, Hook Horror Spore Servant	
Troglodyte	229		Troglodyte Champion of Laogzed	
Awakened Zurkhwood	230			
Bridesmaid of Zuggtmoy	230			
Chamberlain of Zuggtmoy	230–231			
Steeders	231	Monstrous Compendium Volume Two (1989), Monstrous Manual (1993)	Female Steeder, Male Steeder	
Droki	231–232			
Grisha	232			
Narrak	232			
The Pudding King	233			
Yestabrod	233			
Baphomet	234–235	The Lost Caverns of Tsojcanth (1982), Monster Manual II (1983), Monster Mythology (1992), Fiendish Codex I: Hordes of the Abyss (2006), Dragon #369 (2008)		
Demogorgon	236–237	Supplement III: Eldritch Wizardry (1976), Monster Manual (1977), D&D Immortals Rules (1986), Monster Mythology (1992), Book of Vile Darkness (2002), Fiendish Codex I: Hordes of the Abyss (2006), Monster Manual 2 (2009)		Inspired by its real-world mythological counterpart.
Fraz-Urb'luu	238–239	The Lost Caverns of Tsojcanth (1982), Monster Manual II (1983), Fiendish Codex I: Hordes of the Abyss (2006), Dungeon #208 (2012)		
Graz'zt	240–241	The Lost Caverns of Tsojcanth (1982), Monster Manual II (1983), Iuz the Evil (1993), Planes of Chaos (1994), For Duty & Deity (1998), Book of Vile Darkness (2002), Fiendish Codex I: Hordes of the Abyss (2006), Dragon #360 (2007), Manual of the Planes (2008)		
Juiblex	242–243	Monster Manual (1977), Monster Mythology (1992), Book of Vile Darkness (2002), Fiendish Codex I: Hordes of the Abyss (2006), Dungeon #188 (2011)		
Orcus	244–245	Supplement III: Eldritch Wizardry (1976), Monster Manual (1977), D&D Immortals Rules (1986), Dungeon #89 (2001), Book of Vile Darkness (2002), Fiendish Codex I: Hordes of the Abyss (2006), Monster Manual (2008)		Inspired by its real-world mythological counterpart.
Yeenoghu	246–247	Monster Manual (1977), Monster Mythology (1992), Book of Vile Darkness (2002), Fiendish Codex I: Hordes of the Abyss (2006), Dragon #364 (2008)		
Zuggtmoy	248–249	The Temple of Elemental Evil (1985), Dragon #337 (2005), Fiendish Codex I: Hordes of the Abyss (2006), Demonomicon (2010)		

== B65170000 – Curse of Strahd (2016) ==
Curse of Strahd is the fifth adventure module for the 5th edition Dungeons & Dragons line. It contains statistics for the new monsters described in the module in Appendix D.

ISBN 978-0-7869-6598-4

Creature	Page	Other Appearances	Variants	Description
Animated Objects	225–227		Baba Lysaga's Creeping Hut, Broom of Animated Attack, Guardian Portrait, Strahd's Animated Armor	
Baba Lysaga	228–229			
Barovian Witch	229			
Tree Blight	230			
Ezmerelda d'Avenir	230–231			
Izek Strazni	231–232			
Kasimir Velikov	232–233			
Madam Eva	233–234	Ravenloft (1983), House of Strahd (1993), Ravenloft Gazetteer Volume I (2002), Expedition to Castle Ravenloft (2006)		
Mongrelfolk	234	Dwellers of the Forbidden City (1981), Monster Manual II (1983), Monstrous Compendium Volume Two (1989), Monstrous Manual (1993), Fiend Folio (2003)		
Phantom Warrior	235	Monster Manual (2008)		
Pidlwick II	235–236			
Rahadin	236–237			
Rictavio	238			
Strahd von Zarovich	239–240	Ravenloft (1983), Ravenloft II: The House on Gryphon Hill (1986), Ravenloft: Realm of Terror (1990), House of Strahd (1993), Ravenloft Campaign Setting (1994), Ravenloft: Domains of Dread (1997), Ravenloft: Secrets of the Dread Realms (2001), Ravenloft Gazetteer Volume I (2002), Expedition to Castle Ravenloft (2006), Open Grave: Secrets of the Undead (2009)		
Strahd Zombie	241	Ravenloft (1983), Ravenloft: Realm of Terror (1990), Monstrous Compendium – Ravenloft Appendix III (1994), Ravenloft Gazetteer Volume I (2002), Ravenloft: Denizens of Dread (2004), Expedition to Castle Ravenloft (2006), Open Grave: Secrets of the Undead (2009)		
Vladimir Horngaard	241–242			
Wereraven	242	Monstrous Compendium – Ravenloft Appendix (1991), Monstrous Manual (1993), Monstrous Compendium – Ravenloft Appendices I & II (1996), Ravenloft: Denizens of Darkness (2002), Ravenloft: Denizens of Dread (2004)		

== B86690000 – Storm King's Thunder (2016) ==
Storm King's Thunder is the sixth adventure module for the 5th edition Dungeons & Dragons line. It contains statistics for the new monsters described in the module in Appendix C.

ISBN 978-0-7869-6600-4

Creature	Page	Other Appearances	Variants	Description
Crag Cat	240			
Hulking Crab	240			
Iymrith the Dragon	241			Ancient Blue Dragon
Maegera the Dawn Titan	241			
Purple Wormling	242			
Tressym	242–243			
Uthgardt Shaman	243–244			
Yakfolk Warrior	244			
Yakfolk Priest	245			

== B86820000 – Volo's Guide to Monsters (2016) ==
Volo's Guide to Monsters introduces nearly 100 monsters to the 5th edition Dungeons & Dragons line. The book features a preface on page 4, a chapter on monster lore on pages 5–102, a chapter on character races on pages 103–120, new monster descriptions on pages 121–206, an appendix of Assorted Beasts on pages 207–208, a second appendix of Nonplayer Characters on pages 209–220, and a third appendix of Monster Lists on pages 221–224.

ISBN 978-0-7869-6601-1

Creature	Page	Other Appearances	Variants	Description
Mind Flayers	71, 171–175	Dungeon #24 (1990; Ulitharid), Menzoberranzan (1992; Alhoon), Monstrous Compendium Annual Volume One (1994; Ulitharid), Monstrous Compendium Annual Volume Three (1996; Alhoon), The Illithiad (1998; Alhoon, Elder Brain, Ulitharid), Monstrous Compendium: Monsters of Faerûn (2001; Alhoon), Lords of Madness: The Book of Aberrations (2005; Alhoon, Elder Brain, Ulitharid)	Mind Flayer Psion, Alhoon, Mind Flayer Lich (Illithilich), Elder Brain, Ulitharid	An alhoon is even more powerful than other illithids because it has developed "powerful sorcery to augment their already fearsome psionic powers". An elder brain is a 10-foot-diameter (3.0 m) brain with immense psionic abilities; the center of an illithid community. A version of a brain in a jar, it was ranked among the strongest monsters in the game by Scott Baird from Screen Rant.
Yuan-ti	96, 202–206	Dragon #151 (1989; Broodguard, as Histachii), Monstrous Compendium – Kara-Tur Appendix (1990; Broodguard, as Histachii), Monstrous Manual (1993; Broodguard, as Histachii), Monstrous Compendium: Monsters of Faerûn (2001; Broodguard), Fiend Folio (2003; Anathema), Ghostwalk (2003; Broodguard, as template), Monster Manual (2008; Anathema)	Yuan-ti Malison Variants (Type 4, Type 5), Yuan-ti Anathema, Yuan-ti Broodguard, Yuan-ti Mind Whisperer, Yuan-ti Nightmare Speaker, Yuan-ti Pit Master	
Banderhobb	122	Monster Manual 3 (2010)		Paste magazine reviewer Cameron Kunzelmann found the banderhobb an inventive and "super weird" monster beyond the game's staples.
Barghest	123	Dragon #26 (1979), Monster Manual II (1983), Planescape Campaign Setting (1994), Monster Manual (2000), Monster Manual (2003), Monster Manual 2 (2009), Dead in Thay (2014)		
Beholders	124–126	Monstrous Compendium – Forgotten Realms Appendix (1989; Gauth), The Ruins of Undermountain (1991; Death Kiss), Monstrous Manual (1993; Death Kiss and Gauth), I, Tyrant (1996; Death Kiss and Gauth), Monstrous Compendium: Monsters of Faerûn (2001; Death Kiss and Gazer, as Eyeball), Monster Manual (2003; Gauth), Dragon Compendium Volume 1 (2005; Death Kiss, as Bleeder), Mysteries of the Moonsea (2006; Gazer, as Eyeball), Monster Vault (2010; Gauth)	Death Kiss, Gauth, Gazer, Gazer Familiar	A "creature that looks at you and is destroying you by the power of its magical eyes". A terrible beast, but depicted as "a cuddly rosy ball with too many eyes". Designed to counter magic-using characters while being a formidable opponent for a whole party due to its versatility. Considered one of "the game's signature monsters" by Philip J. Clements. A "classic", "iconic", as well as "one of the most feared and fearsome monsters of the game", present through all editions.
Bodak	127	The Lost Caverns of Tsojcanth (1982), Monster Manual II (1983), Monstrous Compendium – Outer Planes Appendix (1991), Monstrous Compendium – Planescape Appendix (1994), Monster Manual (2000), Monster Manual (2003), Monster Manual (2008)		
Boggle	128	Secret of the Slavers Stockade (1981), Monster Manual II (1983), Monstrous Compendium Annual Volume Two (1995), Monster Manual II (2002), Monster Vault: Threats to the Nentir Vale (2011)		
Catoblepas	129	The Strategic Review #7 (1976), Supplement III: Eldritch Wizardry (1976), Monster Manual (1977), D&D Master Rules (1985; as Nekrozon), Monstrous Compendium Volume One (1989), Dungeons & Dragons Rules Cyclopedia (1991; as Nekrozon), Monstrous Manual (1993), Dragon #299 (2002), Monster Manual II (2002), Monster Manual 3 (2010)		David M. Ewalt described it as "an overweight buffalo with stumpy legs, a giraffe-like neck, and a warthog's head". An "old personal favorite" of reviewer Mark Theurer. Black Gate editor Howard Andrew Jones remarked on their presence throughout the game's history.
Cave Fisher	130	Slave Pits of the Undercity (1980), Monster Manual II (1983), Monstrous Compendium Volume One (1989), Monstrous Manual (1993), Dragon #355 (2007), Monster Manual 3 (2010)		
Chitines	131–132	Monstrous Compendium – Forgotten Realms Appendix II (1991), Monstrous Compendium Annual Volume One (1994), Monstrous Compendium: Monsters of Faerûn (2001), Underdark (2003), Monster Manual 3 (2010)	Chitine, Choldrith	
Cranium Rats	133	Planescape Campaign Setting (1994), The Illithiad (1998), Fiend Folio (2003; as Swarm, Cranium Rat Swarm)	Cranium Rat, Swarm of Cranium Rats	Ranked among the weakest monsters in the game by Scott Baird from Screen Rant. Only in higher numbers do they become more intelligent, psionic, and dangerous.
Darklings	134	Fiend Folio (1981; as Dark Creeper and Dark Stalker), Monstrous Compendium – Fiend Folio Appendix (1992; as Dark Creeper and Dark Stalker), Fiend Folio (2003; as Dark Ones), Keep on the Shadowfell (2008; as Dark One), Monster Manual (2008; as Dark One)	Darkling, Darkling Elder	
Deep Scion	135			
Demons	136–137	Monster Manual II (1983; Babau), Monstrous Compendium – Outer Planes Appendix (1991; Babau), Monstrous Compendium – Planescape Appendix (1994; Babau), Book of Vile Darkness (2002; Babau), Monster Manual II (2002; Maw, as Abyssal Maw), Monster Manual (2003; Babau), Dungeon #112 (2004; Shoosuva), Monster Manual 3 (2010; Babau, Maw), Monster Vault (2010; Babau)	Babau, Maw Demon, Shoosuva	
Devourer	138	Monstrous Compendium – Planescape Appendix III (1998), Monster Manual (2000), Monster Manual (2003), Monster Manual (2008)		A giant skeleton that is holding a small figure prisoner in their ribcage, this creature is highlighted by reviewer Kaneda for characters to steer away from.
Dinosaurs	139–140	Monster Manual (1977; Brontosaurus, Stegosaurus), Monster Manual II (1983; Deinonychus, Dimetrodon), Creature Catalogue (1986; Brontosaurus), Monstrous Compendium – Forgotten Realms Appendix (1989; Brontosaurus, Deinonychus, Dimetrodron, Stegosaurus), Monstrous Manual (1993; Deinonychus, Stegosaurus), Monstrous Compendium Annual Volume Two (1995; Brontosaurus, Dimetrodon), Monster Manual (2000; Deinonychus), Monster Manual II (2002; Quetzalcoatlus), Monster Manual (2003; Deinonychus)	Brontosaurus, Deinonychus, Dimetrodon, Hadrosaurus, Quetzalcoatlus, Stegosaurus, Velociraptor	
Draegloth	141	Monstrous Compendium: Monsters of Faerûn (2001), Drow of the Underdark (2007), Forgotten Realms Campaign Guide (2008)		
Firenewts	142–143	Fiend Folio (1981), Monstrous Compendium – Forgotten Realms Appendix (1989), Monstrous Compendium Annual Volume Three (1996), Monstrous Compendium: Monsters of Faerûn (2001)	Firenewt Warrior, Giant Strider, Firenewt Warlock of Imix	
Flail Snail	144	Fiend Folio (1981), Monstrous Compendium – Greyhawk Appendix (1990)		Shannon Applecline considered the flail snail one of the "silly monsters" of the game. CJ Miozzi included the flail snail on The Escapist's list of "The Dumbest Dungeons & Dragons Monsters Ever (And How To Use Them)". Paste magazine reviewer Cameron Kunzelmann found it an inventive and "super weird" monster beyond the game's staples.
Froghemoth	145	Expedition to the Barrier Peaks (1980), Monster Manual II (1983), Monstrous Compendium Annual Volume Two (1995), Dungeon #128 (2005)		Reviewer Cameron Kunzelmann found the froghemoth, a large amphibious predator, a straightforward monster without need for detailed background.
Giants	146–151		Cloud Giant Smiling One, Fire Giant Dreadnought, Frost Giant Everlasting One, Mouth of Grolantor, Stone Giant Dreamwalker, Storm Giant Quintessent	
Girallon	152	Monster Manual (2000), Monster Manual (2003), Monster Manual 3 (2010)		
Gnolls	153–155	Fiend Folio (1981; Flind), Monstrous Compendium Volume One (1989; Flind), Monstrous Manual (1993; Flind), Monster Manual III (2004; Flind), Monster Manual 2 (2009; Witherling)	Flind, Gnoll Flesh Gnawer, Gnoll Hunter, Gnoll Witherling	
Grungs	156–157	Greyhawk Adventures (1988), Monstrous Compendium – Greyhawk Appendix (1990)	Grung, Grung Elite Warrior, Grung Wildling	"selfish, simple-minded frog people" based on poisonous frogs
Guard Drake	158	Monster Manual (2008), Monster Vault (2010), Hoard of the Dragon Queen (2014), The Rise of Tiamat (2014)	Guard Drake, Chromatic Guard Drakes	
Hags	159–160	The Forgotten Temple of Tharizdun (1982; Annis), Monster Manual II (1983; Annis), Monstrous Compendium Volume Two (1989; Annis), Monstrous Manual (1993; Annis), Spellbound (1995; Bheur), Monstrous Compendium Annual Volume One (1994; Bheur), Monster Manual (2000; Annis), Unapproachable East (2003; Bheur), Monster Manual (2003; Annis)	Annis Hag, Bheur Hag	
Hobgoblins	161–162		Hobgoblin Devastator, Hobgoblin Iron Shadow	
Ki-rin	163–164	Supplement III: Eldritch Wizardry (1976), Monster Manual (1977), Monstrous Compendium Volume Two (1989), The Complete Psionics Handbook (1991), Monstrous Manual (1993), Oriental Adventures (2001)		Based on the kirin from Japanese mythology, an example of the diverse cultures amalgamated into D&D. Black Gate reviewer Howard Andrew Jones called them "old stalwarts" of the game.
Kobolds	165–167	Monster Manual (2008; Kobold Dragonshield), Monster Vault (2010; Kobold Dragonshield)	Kobold Dragonshield, Kobold Inventor, Kobold Scale Sorcerer	
Korred	168	Monster Cards (1981), Monster Manual II (1983), Monstrous Compendium Volume One (1989), Monstrous Manual (1993; as Satyr, Korred)		Based on the korred from Breton mythology.
Leucrotta	169	Monster Manual (1977), Monstrous Compendium Volume Two (1989), Monstrous Manual (1993), Monstrous Compendium: Monsters of Faerûn (2001), City of Splendors: Waterdeep (2005)		
Meenlock	170	Fiend Folio (1981), Greyhawk Ruins (1990), Monstrous Compendium Annual Volume Two (1995), Monster Manual II (2002), Monster Manual 3 (2010)		
Mindwitness	176	Underdark (2003)		
Morkoth	177–178	Supplement II: Blackmoor (1975), Monster Manual (1977), Monstrous Compendium Volume Two (1989), Monstrous Manual (1993), Monster Manual II (2002)		Paste magazine reviewer Cameron Kunzelmann found the morkoth an inventive and "super weird" monster beyond the game's staples.
Neogi	179–180	Spelljammer: AD&D Adventures in Space (1989), Monstrous Manual (1993), Monster Manual II (2002), Lords of Madness: The Book of Aberrations (2005)	Neogi Hatchling, Neogi, Neogi Master	
Neothelid	181	The Illithiad (1998), Psionics Handbook (2001), Expanded Psionics Handbook (2004)		
Nilbog	182	Fiend Folio (1981)		
Orcs	183–186	Hellgate Keep (1998; Tanarukk), Monstrous Compendium: Monsters of Faerûn (2001; Tanarukk)	Orc Blade of Ilneval, Orc Claw of Luthic, Orc Hand of Yurtrus, Orc Nurtured One of Yurtrus, Orc Red Fang of Shargaas, Tanarukk	
Quickling	187	Monster Manual II (1983), Monstrous Compendium – Greyhawk Appendix (1990), Monstrous Compendium Annual Volume Two (1995), Monster Manual (2008)		Small, intelligent, chaotic and speedy, it appeared on Geek.com's list of "The most underrated monsters of Advanced Dungeons & Dragons".
Redcap	188	Monster Manual III (2004)		
Sea Spawn	189			
Shadow Mastiff	190	Monster Manual II (1983), Tales of the Lance (1992), Monstrous Compendium Annual Volume Three (1996), Monster Manual (2000), Monster Manual (2003)	Shadow Mastiff, Shadow Mastiff Alpha	
Slithering Tracker	191	The Strategic Review #5 (1975), Monster Manual (1977), Monstrous Compendium Volume Two (1989), Monstrous Manual (1993)		Intelligent stealthy jelly creature. Either evolved from simpler relatives, or persons magically transfigured "by hags and liches into a blobby puddle of remains" motivated by revenge. Reviewer Zack Furniss saw the monster on the "more horrific side of D&D" and observed: "even once they've found their vengeance, they're still a nasty blob and often go insane because they can't find satiation or communicate. Grim stuff."
Spawn of Kyuss	192	Fiend Folio (1981; as Son of Kyuss), Monstrous Compendium – Greyhawk Appendix (1990; as Son of Kyuss), Monstrous Compendium Annual Volume Three (1996; as Son of Kyuss), Living Greyhawk Journal #1 (2000; as Son of Kyuss), Monster Manual II (2002)		
Tlincalli	193	Monstrous Compendium – Forgotten Realms Appendix II (1991), Monstrous Manual (1993; as Manscorpion)		
Trapper	194	The Strategic Review #5 (1975; as Lurker), Monster Manual (1977), Monstrous Compendium Volume Two (1989), Monstrous Manual (1993)		An original creation for the game's artificial underground environment, this monster was designed as a trap for unwary player characters; the trapper camouflages as a piece of floor, engulfing a victim stepping on it. Rob Bricken of io9 identified the lurker and the trapper as two of "The 12 Most Obnoxious Dungeons & Dragons Monsters".
Vargouille	195	Monster Manual II (1983), City of Delights (1993), Monstrous Compendium – Planescape Appendix (1994), Monster Manual (2000), Monster Manual (2003)		
Vegepygmies	196–197	Expedition to the Barrier Peaks (1980), Monster Manual II (1983), Monstrous Manual (1993)	Vegepygmy, Vegepygmy Chief, Thorny	
Wood Woad	198	Monster Manual III (2004)		
Xvarts	199–200	Fiend Folio (1981), Monstrous Compendium – Fiend Folio Appendix (1992), Living Greyhawk Journal #1 (2000), Dragon #339 (2006), Monster Manual 3 (2010; as Xivart)	Xvart, Xvart Speakers, Xvart Warlock of Raxivort	Bald, blue-skinned humanoids with orange eyes that stand only 3 feet tall. First published in White Dwarf #9 (October/November 1978) under the name of "svart", submitted by Cricky Hitchcock and "taken from The Weirdstone of Brisingamon by Alan Garner", who in turn took inspiration from the Norse myth of the svartálfar. It was voted among the top ten monsters from the magazine's "Fiend Factory" column and reprinted in Best of White Dwarf Articles (1980). Forgotten Realms author Ed Greenwood considered xvarts to be redundant creatures with no unique or interesting characteristics.
Yeth Hound	201	Monster Manual II (1983), Monstrous Compendium – Greyhawk Appendix (1990), Monstrous Compendium – Planescape Appendix (1994), Monster Manual (2000), Monster Manual (2003)		
Aurochs	207			
Cattle	207–208	Fiend Folio (1981; Rothé), Monster Manual II (1983; Stench Kow), Drow of the Underdark (1991; Rothé), Monstrous Manual (1993), Forgotten Realms Campaign Setting (2001; Rothé), Fool's Grove (2009; Stench Kow)	Cow, Ox, Rothé, Stench Kow	Lawrence Schick described the stench kow as "a monstrous bison that smells real bad". CJ Miozzi included the stench kow on The Escapist's list of "The Dumbest Dungeons & Dragons Monsters Ever (And How To Use Them)".
Dolphin	208			
Swarm of Rot Grubs	208	Monster Manual (1977), Monstrous Compendium Volume Two (1989), Monstrous Manual (1993), Dungeonscape (2007), Monster Manual 3 (2010)		An original creation for the game's artificial underground environment, this monster was designed as a trap for unwary player characters: living in corpses, they infect those who disturb these dead searching for riches.
Abjurer	209			
Apprentice Wizard	209			
Archdruid	210			
Archer	210			
Bard	211			
Blackguard	211			
Champion	212			
Conjurer	212			
Diviner	213			
Enchanter	213			
Evoker	214			
Illusionist	214			
Kraken Priest	215			
Martial Arts Adept	216			
Master Thief	216			
Necromancer	217			
Swashbuckler	217			
Transmuter	218			
War Priest	218			
Warlock of the Archfey	219			
Warlock of the Fiend	219			
Warlock of the Great Old One	220			
Warlord	220			

== C22070000 – Tales from the Yawning Portal (2017) ==
Tales from the Yawning Portal is the seventh adventure module for the 5th edition Dungeons & Dragons line. It contains statistics for the new monsters described in the module in Appendix B.

ISBN 978-0-7869-6609-7

Creature	Page	Other Appearances	Variants	Description
Animated Table	230	The Forge of Fury (2000)		
Barghest	230	Dragon #26 (1979), Monster Manual II (1983), Planescape Campaign Setting (1994), Monster Manual (2000), Monster Manual (2003), Monster Manual 2 (2009), Dead in Thay (2014), Volo's Guide to Monsters (2016)		
Centaur Mummy	231	The Hidden Shrine of Tamoachan (1980)		
Champion	231	Volo's Guide to Monsters (2016)		
Choker	232	The Dwarves of Rockhome (1988), Creature Catalog (1993), Monstrous Compendium – Mystara Appendix (1994), Monster Manual (2000), Monster Manual (2003), Monster Manual (2008), Dead in Thay (2014)		
Conjurer	232	Volo's Guide to Monsters (2016)		
Deathlock Wight	233	Keep on the Shadowfell (2008), Monster Manual (2008), Dead in Thay (2014)		
Dread Warrior	233	Spellbound (1995), Monstrous Compendium Annual Volume Three (1996), Monstrous Compendium: Monsters of Faerûn (2001), Forgotten Realms Campaign Guide (2008), Dead in Thay (2014)		
Duergar Spy	234	The Forge of Fury (2000)		
Enchanter	234	Volo's Guide to Monsters (2016)		
Evoker	235	Volo's Guide to Monsters (2016)		
Giant Crayfish	235	White Plume Mountain (1979), The Hidden Shrine of Tamoachan (1980), Monstrous Compendium Volume Two (1989), Monstrous Manual (1993)		
Giant Ice Toad	235			
Giant Lightning Eel	236			
Giant Skeleton	236			
Giant Subterranean Lizard	236			
Greater Zombie	237	Tomb of Horrors (1978)		
Illusionist	237	Volo's Guide to Monsters (2016)		
Kalka-Kylla	238	The Hidden Shrine of Tamoachan (1980)		
Kelpie	238	White Plume Mountain (1979), Fiend Folio (1981), Monstrous Compendium Volume Two (1989), Monstrous Manual (1993), Fiend Folio (2003)		
Leucrotta	239	Monster Manual (1977), Monstrous Compendium Volume Two (1989), Monstrous Manual (1993), Monstrous Compendium: Monsters of Faerûn (2001), City of Splendors: Waterdeep (2005), Volo's Guide to Monsters (2016)		
Malformed Kraken	239			
Martial Arts Adept	240	Volo's Guide to Monsters (2016)		
Nereid	240	The Hidden Shrine of Tamoachan (1980), Monster Manual II (1983), Monstrous Compendium Volume Two (1989), Monstrous Manual (1993), Stormwrack (2005)		
Necromancer	241	Volo's Guide to Monsters (2016)		
Ooze Master	241	Dead in Thay (2014)		
Sea Lion	242	Monster Manual (1977), Monstrous Compendium Volume Two (1989), Monstrous Manual (1993), Monster Manual (2000), Monster Manual (2003; as Sea Cat)		
Sharwyn Hucrele	242	The Sunless Citadel (2000)		
Sir Braford	243	The Sunless Citadel (2000)		
Siren	243	Tomb of Horrors (1978)		
Tarul Var	244	Dead in Thay (2014)		
Tecuziztecatl	245	The Hidden Shrine of Tamoachan (1980)		
Thayan Apprentice	245	Dead in Thay (2014)		
Thayan Warrior	246	Dead in Thay (2014)		
Thorn Slinger	246	The Hidden Shrine of Tamoachan (1980)		
Transmuter	247	Volo's Guide to Monsters (2016)		
Vampiric Mist	247	Monstrous Compendium – Greyhawk Appendix (1990), Monstrous Manual (1993), Monster Vault: Threats to the Nentir Vale (2011)		
White Maw	248	Dead in Thay (2014)		
Yusdrayl	248	The Sunless Citadel (2000)		

== C22080000 – Tomb of Annihilation (2017) ==
Tomb of Annihilation is the eighth adventure module for the 5th edition Dungeons & Dragons line. It contains statistics for the new monsters described in the module in Appendix D.

ISBN 978-0-7869-6610-3

Creature	Page	Other Appearances	Variants	Description
Acererak	209	Tomb of Horrors (1978), Return to the Tomb of Horrors (1998), Open Grave: Secrets of the Undead (2009), Tomb of Horrors (2010), Tales from the Yawning Portal (2017)		
Albino Dwarves	210		Albino Dwarf Warrior, Albino Dwarf Spirit Warrior	
Aldani (Lobsterfolk)	210–211			
Almiraj	211	Fiend Folio (1981), Monstrous Compendium – Fiend Folio Appendix (1992)		Based on Al-mi'raj "in Islamic poetry, a yellow hare with a single black horn on its head." Counted among the saddest, lamest creatures in Fiend Folio by artist Sean McCarthy, a hybrid creature with physiology resulting from maladaptation rather than evil.
Artus Cimber	212–213			
Assassin Vine	213	Monster Manual (2000), Monster Manual (2003)		
Atropal	214–215	Epic Level Handbook (2002), Monster Manual (2008)		Tyler Linn of Cracked.com identified the atropal as one of "15 Idiotic Dungeons and Dragons Monsters" in 2009, describing it as "a stillborn god-fetus risen from the dead to confuse everyone at the end of 2001: A Space Odyssey." He comments: "Despite possessing godlike powers and being metal as fuck, the Atropal at its core is still just a dead fetus. Here's a general rule for undead creatures: If the thing wasn't any kind of threat when it was alive, it's probably not going to be any more of a problem in its slower, decomposing form." Screen Rant compiled a list of the game's "10 Most Powerful (And 10 Weakest) Monsters, Ranked" in 2018, calling this one of the strongest, saying "An atropal might not be the most powerful creature on this list but it is easily the most fearsome to look at." The atropal appeared on the 2018 Screen Rant top list at #20 on " Dungeons & Dragons: The 20 Most Powerful Creatures, Ranked", and Scott Baird highlighted that "You may think that you can protect yourself from the negative energy aura with magic, but the atropal can cast greater dispelling at will."
Bodak	215	The Lost Caverns of Tsojcanth (1982), Monster Manual II (1983), Monstrous Compendium – Outer Planes Appendix (1991), Monstrous Compendium – Planescape Appendix (1994), Monster Manual (2000), Monster Manual (2003), Monster Manual (2008), Volo's Guide to Monsters (2016)		
Brontosaurus	215	Monster Manual (1977), Creature Catalogue (1986), Monstrous Compendium – Forgotten Realms Appendix (1989), Monstrous Compendium Annual Volume Two (1995), Volo's Guide to Monsters (2016)		
Champion	216–217	Volo's Guide to Monsters (2016)		
Chwinga	216–217			
Deinonychus	217	Monster Manual II (1983), Monstrous Compendium – Forgotten Realms Appendix (1989), Monstrous Manual (1993), Monster Manual (2000), Monster Manual (2003), Volo's Guide to Monsters (2016)		
Dimetrodon	217	Monster Manual II (1983), Monstrous Compendium – Forgotten Realms Appendix (1989), Monstrous Compendium Annual Volume Two (1995), Volo's Guide to Monsters (2016)		
Dragonbait	217–218	Curse of the Azure Bonds (1989), Hall of Heroes (1989), Heroes' Lorebook (1996), Serpent Kingdoms – Saurials: More Lizardkin (2004)		
Eblis	219	The Land Beyond the Magic Mirror (1983), Monster Manual II (1983), Monstrous Compendium – Forgotten Realms Appendix (1989), Monstrous Manual (1993)		
Firenewt	219	Fiend Folio (1981), Monstrous Compendium – Forgotten Realms Appendix (1989), Monstrous Compendium Annual Volume Three (1996), Monstrous Compendium: Monsters of Faerûn (2001), Volo's Guide to Monsters (2016)	Firenewt Warrior, Firenewt Warlock of Imix	
Flail Snail	220	Fiend Folio (1981), Monstrous Compendium – Greyhawk Appendix (1990), Volo's Guide to Monsters (2016)		
Flying Monkey	220–221			
Froghemoth	221	Expedition to the Barrier Peaks (1980), Monster Manual II (1983), Monstrous Compendium Annual Volume Two (1995), Dungeon #128 (2005), Volo's Guide to Monsters (2016)		
Giant Four-Armed Gargoyle	221			
Giant Snapping Turtle	222	Monster Manual (1977), Monstrous Compendium – Greyhawk Appendix (1990), Monstrous Compendium Annual Volume Two (1995), Stormwrack (2005)		
Giant Strider	222	Fiend Folio (1981), Monstrous Compendium – Forgotten Realms Appendix (1989), Monstrous Compendium Annual Volume Three (1996), Monstrous Compendium: Monsters of Faerûn (2001), Volo's Guide to Monsters (2016)		
Girallon	222	Monster Manual (2000), Monster Manual (2003), Monster Manual 3 (2010), Volo's Guide to Monsters (2016)		
Grungs	223–224	Greyhawk Adventures (1988), Monstrous Compendium – Greyhawk Appendix (1990), Volo's Guide to Monsters (2016)	Grung, Grung Elite Warrior, Grung Wildling	
Hadrosaurus	224	Volo's Guide to Monsters (2016)		
Jaculi	224–225	Fiend Folio (1981), Monstrous Manual (1993), Serpent Kingdoms (2004)		
Kamadan	225	Fiend Folio (1981), Maztica Campaign Set (1991), Dungeon #136 (2006)		
Kobolds	226–227	Volo's Guide to Monsters (2016)	Kobold Scale Sorcerer, Kobold Inventor	
Liara Portyr	227			
Mantrap	227	Monster Manual II (1983), Monstrous Compendium Volume Two (1989), Monstrous Manual (1993)		
Mwaxanaré and Na	228			
Pterafolk	229	The Jungles of Chult (1993; as Pteraman), Villains' Lorebook (1998; as Pteraman), Monstrous Compendium: Monsters of Faerûn (2001), Serpent Kingdoms (2004)		A flying saurian folk.
Quetzalcoatlus	229–230	Monster Manual II (2002), Volo's Guide to Monsters (2016)		
Ras Nsi	229–231			
Stegosaurus	231	Monster Manual (1977), Monstrous Compendium – Forgotten Realms Appendix (1989), Monstrous Manual (1993), Volo's Guide to Monsters (2016)		
Stone Juggernaut	231	Tomb of Horrors (1978), Master of the Desert Nomads (1983), Creature Catalogue (1986), Creature Catalog (1993), Monstrous Manual (1993; as Juggernaut), Monster Manual II (2002; as Juggernaut)		
Su-monster	232	Supplement III: Eldritch Wizardry (1976), Monster Manual (1977), The Complete Psionics Handbook (1991), Monstrous Manual (1993), Monster Manual 3 (2010)		
Tabaxi	232–233	Fiend Folio (1981), Fires of Zatal (1991), Monstrous Manual (1993)	Tabaxi Hunter, Tabaxi Minstrel	Described as a "lithe feline" race and "cat person". In 2020, Comic Book Resources counted the tabaxi as # 4 on the list of "10 Powerful Monster Species That You Should Play As", stating that "a Tabaxi monk with Boots of Speed and a few other speed buffs can in theory cover anywhere between 320ft per round to 253,440ft per round. Your ability to do this and break the sound barrier in-game entirely depends on how much time and leniency the DM grants you though." Again referring to the 5th edition presentation, A.V. Club praised the tabaxi as an interesting player character choice, calling that they "view money as a mere tool to be used in finding the real treasure—a good story" a "great character trait," while Black Gate reviewer Howard Andrew Jones called them "perennially popular".
Thorny	233	Expedition to the Barrier Peaks (1980), Monster Manual II (1983), Monstrous Manual (1993), Volo's Guide to Monsters (2016)		
Tri-flower Frond	234	Monster Manual II (1983), Monstrous Compendium Volume Two (1989), Monstrous Manual (1993)		
Vegepygmies	234–235	Expedition to the Barrier Peaks (1980), Monster Manual II (1983), Monstrous Manual (1993), Volo's Guide to Monsters (2016)	Vegepygmy, Vegepygmy Chief	CJ Miozzi included the vegepygmy on The Escapist's list of "The Dumbest Dungeons & Dragons Monsters Ever (And How To Use Them)".
Velociraptor	235	Volo's Guide to Monsters (2016)		
Volothamp "Volo" Geddarm	235–236	Marco Volo: Arrival (1994), Volo's Guide to Monsters (2016)		
Xandala	236			
Yellow Musk Creeper and Zombie	237	Dwellers of the Forbidden City (1981), Fiend Folio (1981), Monstrous Compendium Volume Two (1989), Monstrous Manual (1993), Fiend Folio (2003)	Yellow Musk Creeper, Yellow Musk Zombie	Ben Woodard found it an expression of the "seemingly endless morphology of fungal creep and toxicological capacity" within the game. The Fiend Folio's illustration of the yellow musk creeper was used by Richard Garfield for the prototype of the Regrowth spell card during the development of his Magic: The Gathering game.
Yuan-ti Broodguard	238	Dragon #151 (1989; as Histachii), Monstrous Compendium – Kara-Tur Appendix (1990; as Histachii), Monstrous Manual (1993; as Histachii), Monstrous Compendium: Monsters of Faerûn (2001), Ghostwalk (2003), Volo's Guide to Monsters (2016)		
Yuan-ti Nightmare Speaker	238–239	Volo's Guide to Monsters (2016)		
Zindar	238–239			
Zombies	240–241		Ankylosaurus Zombie, Girallon Zombie, Tyrannosaurus Zombie	
Zorbo	241	Monster Cards (1981), Monster Manual II (1983), Monstrous Compendium Annual Volume Two (1995)		

== C45940000 – Mordenkainen's Tome of Foes (2018) ==
Mordenkainen's Tome of Foes introduces over 100 monsters to the 5th edition Dungeons & Dragons line. The book features a preface on page 4, a chapter on the Blood War on pages 5–34, a chapter on Elves on pages 35–63, a chapter on Dwarves and Duergar on pages 65–83, a chapter on Gith on pages 85–97, a chapter on Halflings and Gnomes on pages 99–114, new monster descriptions on pages 115–252, and an appendix of Monster Lists on pages 253–256. One contribution to the book, the Oblex, was created by Make-A-Wish Foundation recipient Nolan Whale.

ISBN 978-0-7869-6624-0

Creature	Page	Other Appearances	Variants	Description
Allip	116	Monster Manual (2000), Monster Manual (2003)		
Astral Dreadnought	117–118	Monstrous Compendium – Planescape Appendix II (1995), Manual of the Planes (2001), Manual of the Planes (2008)		Arcane considered these monsters to "populate their periphery with true terror". Originally called ethereal dreadnought.
Balhannoth	118–119	Monster Manual IV (2006), Monster Manual (2008)		
Berbalang	120	Fiend Folio (1981), Monstrous Compendium – Forgotten Realms Appendix (1989), Monstrous Manual (1993), Monster Manual (2008)		
Boneclaw	121	Monster Manual III (2004), Monster Manual (2008)		
Cadaver Collector	122	Monster Manual III (2004), Monster Vault: Threats to the Nentir Vale (2011)		Bleeding Cool called the cadaver collector "nightmare fuel".
Choker	123	The Dwarves of Rockhome (1988), Creature Catalog (1993), Monstrous Compendium – Mystara Appendix (1994), Monster Manual (2000), Monster Manual (2003), Monster Manual (2008), Dead in Thay (2014), Tales from the Yawning Portal (2017)		
Clockworks	124–126	Fiend Folio (1981; Iron Cobra), Dragon #164 (1990; Iron Cobra), Monstrous Compendium – Fiend Folio Appendix (1992; Iron Cobra), Fiend Folio (2003; Iron Cobra), Monster Manual (2008; Iron Cobra)	Bronze Scout, Iron Cobra, Oaken Bolter, Stone Defender	
Corpse Flower	127			
Deathlock	128–129	Libris Mortis: The Book of Undead (2004), Keep on the Shadowfell (2008; Deathlock Wight), Monster Manual (2008; Deathlock Wight), Dead in Thay (2014; Deathlock Wight), Tales from the Yawning Portal (2017; Deathlock Wight)	Deathlock, Deathlock Mastermind, Deathlock Wight	
Demons	130–139	The Lost Caverns of Tsojcanth (1982; Rutterkin), Monster Manual II (1983; Nabassu, Rutterkin), Monstrous Compendium – Outer Planes Appendix (1991; Molydeus, Nabassu, Rutterkin), Monstrous Compendium – Planescape Appendix (1994; Molydeus, Nabassu, Rutterkin, Wastrilith), Planes of Chaos (1994; Armanite), Monstrous Compendium – Planescape Appendix II (1995; Alkilith, Bulezau, Maurezhi), Monstrous Compendium Annual Volume Three (1996; Armanite), Manual of the Planes (2001; Armanite), Book of Vile Darkness (2002; Rutterkin), Fiend Folio (2003; Alkilith, Maurezhi, Wastrilith), Dungeon #112 (2004; Nabassu), Fiendish Codex I: Hordes of the Abyss (2006; Armanite, Bulezau, Dybbuk, Molydeus, Nabassu, Rutterkin, Sibriex), Demonomicon (2010; Armanite, Bulezau, Nabassu, Sibriex)	Alkilith, Armanite, Bulezau, Dybbuk, Maurezhi, Molydeus, Nabassu, Rutterkin, Abyssal Wretch, Sibriex, Wastrilith	SyFy Wire in 2018 called it one of "The 9 Scariest, Most Unforgettable Monsters From Dungeons & Dragons", saying that "The sibriex is an extremely intelligent horrifying creature that looks as disgusting and dreadful as it actually is."
Demons: Demon Lords	142–157	Supplement III: Eldritch Wizardry (1976; Demogorgon, Orcus), Monster Manual (1977; Demogorgon, Juiblex, Orcus, Yeenoghu), The Lost Caverns of Tsojcanth (1982; Baphomet, Fraz-Urb'luu, Graz'zt), Monster Manual II (1983; Baphomet, Fraz-Urb'luu, Graz'zt), The Temple of Elemental Evil (1985; Zuggtmoy), D&D Immortals Rules (1986; Demogorgon, Orcus), Monster Mythology (1992; Baphomet, Demogorgon, Juiblex, Yeenoghu), Iuz the Evil (1993; Graz'zt), Planes of Chaos (1994; Graz'zt), For Duty & Deity (1998; Graz'zt), Dungeon #89 (2001; Orcus), Book of Vile Darkness (2002; Demogorgon, Graz'zt, Juiblex, Orcus, Yeenoghu), Dragon #337 (2005; Zuggtmoy), Fiendish Codex I: Hordes of the Abyss (2006; Baphomet, Demogorgon, Fraz-Urb'luu, Graz'zt, Juiblex, Orcus, Yeenoghu, Zuggtmoy), Dragon #360 (2007; Graz'zt), Monster Manual (2008; Orcus), Manual of the Planes (2008; Graz'zt), Dragon #364 (2008; Yeenoghu), Dragon #369 (2008; Baphomet), Monster Manual 2 (2009; Demogorgon), Demonomicon (2010; Zuggtmoy), Dungeon #188 (2011; Juiblex), Dungeon #208 (2012; Fraz-Urb'luu), Out of the Abyss (2015)	Baphomet, Demogorgon, Fraz-Urb'luu, Graz'zt, Juiblex, Orcus, Yeenoghu, Zuggtmoy	
Derro	158–159	The Lost Caverns of Tsojcanth (1982), Monster Manual II (1983), Greyhawk Ruins (1990), Monstrous Manual (1993), Monster Manual (2000), Monster Manual (2003), Monster Manual 3 (2010), Out of the Abyss (2015)	Derro, Derro Savant	
Devils	160–169	Fiend Folio (1981; Amnizu, as Styx Devil), Dragon #75 (1983; Abishai), Monster Manual II (1983; Abishai, Nupperibo), Monstrous Compendium – Outer Planes Appendix (1991; Black Abishai, Green Abishai, Red Abishai, Amnizu, Nupperibo), Monstrous Manual (1993; Black Abishai, Green Abishai, Red Abishai), Monstrous Compendium – Planescape Appendix (1994; Black Abishai, Green Abishai, Red Abishai, Amnizu, Nupperibo), Monstrous Compendium: Monsters of Faerûn (2001; Abishai), Manual of the Planes (2001; Narzugon), Monster Manual II (2002; Amnizu), Fiendish Codex II: Tyrants of the Nine Hells (2006; Abishai, Amnizu, Hellfire Engine, Merregon, Narzugon, Nupperibo, Orthon), Monster Manual (2008; Merregon, as Legion Devil), Monster Manual 3 (2010; Narzugon, as Hell Knight), Monster Vault (2010; Merregon, as Legion Devil)	Abishai (Black Abishai, Blue Abishai, Green Abishai, Red Abishai, White Abishai), Amnizu, Hellfire Engine, Merregon, Narzugon, Nupperibo, Orthon	
Devils: Archdevils	170–181	Monster Manual (1977; Geryon), Dragon #75 (1983; Bael, Hutijin, Moloch, Titivilus), Monster Manual II (1983; Bael, Hutijin, Moloch, Titivilus), The Apocalypse Stone (2000; Moloch), Book of Vile Darkness – Even More Archfiends! (2003; Geryon), Dragon #360 (2007; Bael, Titivilus)	Bael, Geryon, Hutijin, Moloch, Titivilus, Zariel	
Drow	182–187		Drow Arachnomancer, Drow Favored Consort, Drow House Captain, Drow Inquisitor, Drow Matron Mother, Drow Shadowblade	
Duergar	188–193		Duergar Despot, Duergar Hammerer, Duergar Kavalrachni, Duergar Mind Master, Duergar Screamer, Duergar Soulblade, Duergar Stone Guard, Duergar Warlord, Duergar Xarrorn	
Eidolon	193–194		Eidolon, Sacred Statue	
Eladrin	195–197		Autumn Eladrin, Spring Eladrin, Summer Eladrin, Winter Eladrin	
Elder Elementals	198–201		Leviathan, Phoenix, Elder Tempest, Zaratan	
Elemental Myrmidons	202–203		Air Elemental Myrmidon, Earth Elemental Myrmidon, Fire Elemental Myrmidon, Water Elemental Myrmidon	
Giff	204			
Gith	205–208		Githyanki Gish, Githyanki Kith'rak, Githyanki Supreme Commander, Githzerai Anarch, Githzerai Enlightened	
Gray Render	209			
Howler	210			
Kruthiks	211–212		Young Kruthik, Adult Kruthik, Kruthik Hive Lord	
Marut	213			
Meazel	214			
Nagpa	215			
Nightwalker	216			
Oblex	217–219		Oblex Spawn, Adult Oblex, Elder Oblex	SyFy Wire in 2018 called it one of "The 9 Scariest, Most Unforgettable Monsters From Dungeons & Dragons", saying that "Eaten by an ooze that can then use your memory and form to trick and lure others in? That's the stuff of horrors — and the stuff of an epic adventure. If you weren't paranoid about other characters before, you should be now!"
Ogres	220–221		Ogre Battering Ram, Ogre Bolt Launcher, Ogre Chain Brute, Ogre Howdah	
Retriever	222			
Salamander, Frost	223			
Shadar-kai	224–226		Gloom Weaver, Shadow Dancer, Soul Monger	
Skulk	227			
Skull Lord	230			
Sorrowsworn	231–233		The Angry, The Hungry, The Lonely, The Lost, The Wretched	
Star Spawn	234–237		Star Spawn Grue, Star Spawn Hulk, Star Spawn Larva Mage, Star Spawn Mangler, Star Spawn Seer	
Steeders	238		Female Steeder, Male Steeder	
Steel Predator	239			
Stone Cursed	240			
Sword Wraith	241		Sword Wraith Commander, Sword Wraith Warrior	
Tortles	242		Tortle, Tortle Druid	
Trolls	243–245		Dire Troll, Rot Troll, Spirit Troll, Venom Troll	
Vampiric Mist	246			
Yugoloths	247–252		Canoloth, Dhergoloth, Hydroloth, Merrenoloth, Oinoloth, Yagnoloth	The canoloth is a fiend distinguished by its sticky barbed tongue.

== Boo's Astral Menagerie (2022) ==
Boo's Astral Menagerie was the bestiary book contained within 2022's Spelljammer: Adventures in Space boxed set for the 5th edition of Dungeons & Dragons, presenting 72 monsters and variants. They range from "friendly aliens" over dragons with "awesome powers" to "plenty of horrors to encounter in space".

Creature	Page	Other Appearances	Variants	Description
Aartuks	8-9	Monstrous Compendium Spelljammer Appendix (1990)	Aartuk Elder, Aaruk Priest, Aartuk Warrior	
Astral Elves	10-13		Astral Elf Aristocrat, Astral Elf Commander, Astral Elf Honor Guard, Astral Elf Star Priest, Astral Elf Warrior	
Autognome	14	Monstrous Compendium Spelljammer Appendix II (1991)		
Braxat	15	Dark Sun Campaign Setting (1991)		
B'rogh	16	Monstrous Compendium Dark Sun Appendix: Terrors of the Desert (1992)		
Chwinga	17		Chwinga Astronaut	
Cosmic Horror	18			
Dohwar	19	Monstrous Compendium Spelljammer Appendix II (1991)		
Esthetic	20	Monstrous Compendium Spelljammer Appendix (1990)		
Eye Monger	21			
Feyr	22	Monstrous Compendium Forgotten Realms Appendix II (1991)		"a tentacled aberration [...]. Turning itself invisible it will attach its tentacles to your face while you sleep to feed on your emotions", one of the creatures bringing a horror element to the Spelljammer setting.
Gaj	23	Dark Sun Campaign Setting (1991)		
Giff	24-25	Spelljammer: AD&D Adventures In Space (1989), Monstrous Manual (1993)	Giff Shipmate, Giff Shock Trooper, Giff Warlord	"anthropomorphic hippo space mercenaries" "with a penchant for firearms"
Githyanki	26-27	Monstrous Compendium Outer Planes Appendix (1991), Monstrous Manual (1993), Planescape Monstrous Compendium Appendix (1994), Mordenkainen's Tome of Foes (2018), Mordenkainen Presents: Monsters of the Multiverse (2022)	Githyanki Buccaneer, Githyanki Star Seeker, Githyanki Xenomancer	
Hadozees	28-29	Monstrous Compendium Spelljammer Appendix (1990)	Hadozee Explorer, Hadozee Shipmate, Hadozee Warrior	Critically described by Aaron Trammell as "a simian race of humanoids reminiscent of old minstrel shows", subject of criticism when translated into 5th edition.
Jammer Leech	30	Monstrous Compendium Spelljammer Appendix (1990)		
Kindori	31	Spelljammer: AD&D Adventures In Space (1989)		
Lunar Dragons	32-35		Ancient Lunar Dragon, Adult Lunar Dragon, Young Lunar Dragon, Lunar Dragon Wyrmling	
Megapede	36	Monstrous Compendium Dark Sun Appendix: Terrors of the Desert (1992)		
Mercane	37	Spelljammer: AD&D Adventures In Space (1989), Monstrous Manual (1993), Planescape Monstrous Compendium Appendix II (1995) (as Arcane)		
Murder Comet	38			
Neh-thalggu	39	Monstrous Compendium Mystara Appendix (1994) (as Brain collector)		
Neogi	40-41	Spelljammer: AD&D Adventures In Space (1989), Monstrous Manual (1993), Volo's Guide to Monsters (2016)	Neogi Hatchling Swarm, Neogi Pirate, Neogi Void Hunter	
Plasmoids	42-43	Monstrous Compendium Spelljammer Appendix (1990)		A "slime race" available as player characters.
Psurlons	44-45	Dark Sun Monstrous Compendium Appendix II: Terrors Beyond Tyr (1995), Planescape Monstrous Compendium Appendix III (1998)	Psurlon, Psurlon Leader, Psurlon Ringer	
Reigar	46-47	Monstrous Compendium Spelljammer Appendix (1990)		
Scavver	48-49	Spelljammer: AD&D Adventures In Space (1989)	Brown Scavver, Gray Scavver, Night Scavver, Void Scavver	
Solar Dragons	50-53		Ancient Solar Dragon, Adult Solar Dragon, Young Solar Dragon, Solar Dragon Wyrmling	A monster lairing in a star, with "awesome" and appropriately light-based powers.
Space Clown	54			
Space Eel	55			
Space Guppy	55			
Space Hamsters	56	Monstrous Compendium Spelljammer Appendix (1990)	Giant Space Hamster, Space Hamster	Looking at their presentation in the 2nd edition of the game, reviewer Alex Lucard considered the giant space hamsters "the most infamous race of creatures TSR ever put out".
Space Mollyhawk	57			
Space Swine	57	Monstrous Compendium Spelljammer Appendix II (1991)		
Ssurran	58	Dark Sun Monstrous Compendium Appendix II: Terrors Beyond Tyr (1995)	Ssurran Defiler, Ssurran Poisoner	
Starlight Apparition	59			
Thri-kreen	60-61	Monster Cards Set 2 (1982), Monster Manual II (1983), Monstrous Compendium Forgotten Realms Appendix (1989), Monstrous Manual (1993), Dark Sun Monstrous Compendium Appendix II: Terrors Beyond Tyr (1995), Monster Manual II (2002), Monster Manual 3 (2010), Monster Manual (2014)	Thri-kreen Gladiator, Thri-kreen Hunter, Thri-kreen Mystic	"Praying mantis man" with four arms and a poisonous bite, created by Paul Reiche III.
Vampirates	62		Vampirate, Vampirate Captain, Vampirate Mage	
Zodar	64	Monstrous Compendium Spelljammer Appendix (1990)		The zodar appeared on the 2018 Screen Rant top list at No. 13 on " Dungeons & Dragons: The 20 Most Powerful Creatures, Ranked", and Scott Baird highlighted that "One of the most mysterious and powerful creatures in the Spelljammer universe are the Zodar, who resemble giant suits of armor. In their Advanced Dungeons & Dragons appearance, they had the maximum Strength score that was allowed in the game and they were immune to almost all forms of damage."

== Morte's Planar Parade (2023) ==
Morte's Planar Parade was the bestiary book contained within the Planescape: Adventures in the Multiverse boxed set published in 2023 for the 5th edition of Dungeons & Dragons. It presents monsters from the game's planes of existence, as well as suggestions how other creatures can be adjusted to fit this unusual setting, through "Morte, a talking skull" functioning as "the "point of view" character".

Creature	Page	Other Appearances	Variants	Description
Archons	16-18		Hound Archon, Lantern Archon, Warden Archon	
Baernaloth	19-20			
Bariaur Wanderer	21			
Cranium Rat Squeakers	22		Cranium Rat Squeaker Swarm	
Dabus	23			
Darkweaver	24-25			
Demodands	26-28		Farastu Demodand, Kelubar Demodand, Shator Demodand	
Eater of Knowledge	29			
Githzerai	30-31		Githzerai Futurist, Githzerai Traveler, Githzerai Uniter	
Guardinals	32-33		Avoral Guardinal, Equinal Guardinal, Musteval Guardinal	
Kolyarut	34			
Maelephant	35			
Modrons	36-40		Decaton Modron, Hexton Modron, Nonaton Modron, Octon Modron, Septon Modron	
Planar Incarnate	41			
Razovine Blight	42			
Rilmani	43-45		Aurumach Rilmani, Cuprilach Rilmani, Ferrumach Rilmani	
Shemeshka	46			
Sunflies	47		Sunfly, Swarm of Sunflies	
Time Dragons	48-51		Ancient Time Dragon, Adult Time Dragon, Young Time Dragon, Time Dragon Wyrmling	
Vargouille Reflection	52			
Athar Null	53			Faction agent
Bleak Cabal Void Soother	53-54			Faction agent
Doomguard Doom Lord	53-54			Faction agent
Doomguard Rot Blade	56-57			Faction agent
Fated Shaker	56-57			Faction agent
Fraternity of Order Law Bender	56-57			Faction agent
Hands of Havoc Fire Starter	58			Faction agent
Harmonium Captain	58-59			Faction agent
Harmonium Peacekeeper	58-59			Faction agent
Heralds of Dust Remnant	59			Faction agent
Mercykiller Bloodhound	60-61			Faction agent
Mind's Eye Matter Smith	60-61			Faction agent
Society of Sensation Muse	61			Faction agent
Transcendent Order Conduit	62			Faction agent
Transcendent Order Instinct	62			Faction agent

== See also ==
- Monsters in Dungeons & Dragons
- List of Dungeons & Dragons monsters (1974–76)
- List of Dungeons & Dragons monsters (1977–94)
- List of Dungeons & Dragons 3rd edition monsters
- List of Dungeons & Dragons 4th edition monsters
