= List of Shadowrun books =

A list of the English-language Shadowrun books, with their SKU numbers.

== Sourcebooks ==
- Four digit numbers were published by FASA; sometimes prefixed by "FAS"
- Five digit numbers were published by:
  - FanPro: 106××, 250××, and 2600×; sometimes prefixed with "FPR"
  - Catalyst: 26×××, with the third digit specifying the book type; 0 for core rulebooks, 1 for core supplements, 2 for settings (locations), 3 for general sourcebooks, 4 for Adventure, 6 for Rules Supplement, 7 for premium, 8 for fiction and 9 for misc; sometimes prefixed with "CAT", "CGL" or "CYT"

Core rulebooks and supplements are primarily composed of rules, and tend to be replaced quickly when a new edition of the game is released. They can be difficult to use with other editions. First, Second, and Third edition were pretty similar, while the Fourth and 20th Anniversary editions were quite different than the first three. Fifth edition built on the Fourth/20th anniversary, while Sixth edition again makes a number of changes to the core rules. Shadowrun Anarchy is almost a different system entirely.

Sourcebooks are a mix of rules and setting. As such, they contain setting information applicable to any edition of the game, and statistics that may need a little updating. Foreign language editions of sourcebooks often contain additional content relating to local variants on the topic in question. Sometimes even whole original books have been published concentrating solely on providing local source material.

SKU	ISBN	Rules edition	Release date	In-universe Date	Title	Notes
7100	1-55560-133-2	1st	1989	2050	Shadowrun	Softcover edition
7101	1-55560-110-3	1st	1989	2050	Shadowrun	Hardcover edition
7102	1-55560-115-4	1st	1989	2050	Shadowrun GM Screen	Bundled with the "Silver Angel" adventure.
7103	1-55560-119-7	1st	1989	2050	Sprawl Sites	A supplement detailing locations, contacts and adventure hooks in Seattle.
7104	1-55560-122-7	1st and 2nd	1989	2050	Street Samurai Catalog	Core weapon rules. The first two printings apply to Shadowrun First Edition. Second and later printings were revised (effectively making this another edition though they have the same catalog and ISBN) to apply to the Second Edition. This revised edition contained the same content but had a number of items that marked as being banned in the second edition. so it can be used for both Shadowrun 1st and 2nd edition rules (just ignore the banned parts for 2nd ed.).
7105	1-55560-123-5	1st	1990	2051	Paranormal Animals of North America	Sourcebook of Magically Awakened creatures of North America.
7106	1-55560-127-8	1st	1990	2050	The Grimoire	Core magic rules.
7107	1-55560-144-8	1st	1991	2053	Virtual Realities	Core hacking rules.
7108	1-55560-169-3	1st	1991	2052	Rigger Black Book	Core vehicle and rigger rules.
7109	1-55560-159-6	1st	1992	2052	Shadowbeat	A guide to pop culture, pro sports and media.
7110	1-55560-156-1	1st	1992	2052	Shadowtech	Expanded cyberware and bioware.
7112	1-55560-199-5	2nd	1993	2053	Paranormal Animals of Europe	Sourcebook of Magically Awakened creatures of Europe.
7113	1-55560-211-8	1st and 2nd	1993	2054	Corporate Shadowfiles	A guide to corporations.
7114	1-55560-223-1	2nd	1994	2055	Fields of Fire	Mercenaries, military gear, weapons and vehicles.
7115	1-55560-230-4	2nd	1994	2054	Lone Star	Details on the law enforcement corporation Lone Star Security.
7116	1-55560-252-5	2nd	1994	2055	Prime Runners	Descriptions and stats for high-profile non player characters.
7117	1-55560-253-3	2nd	1995	2056	Bug City	A supplement devoted to Chicago, a city now taken over by bug spirits.
7118	1-55560-261-4	2nd	1995	2055	Corporate Security Handbook	A guidebook to security technology.
7119	1-55560-267-3	2nd	1995	2056	Cybertechnology	A guide to cyberware
7120	1-55560-273-8	2nd	1995	2057	Awakenings	A guide to magic.
7121	1-55560-290-8	2nd	1996	2057	Threats	A guide to dangerous organizations.
7122	1-55560-306-8	2nd	1996	2057	Portfolio of a Dragon: Dunkelzahn's Secrets	The last will of the great dragon Dunkelzahn.
7123	1-55560-315-7	2nd	1997	2058	Underworld Sourcebook	A guide to the criminal underworld.
7124	1-55560-301-7	2nd	1997	2059	Cyberpirates!	Details on the Caribbean League, the Philippines, West Africa and pirates.
7125	1-55560-362-9	3rd	1999	2061	Corporate Download	A guide to corporations.
7201	1-55560-111-1	1st	1990	2051	Seattle Sourcebook	The first Seattle sourcebook.
7202	1-55560-130-8	1st	1991	2052	Native American Nations Volume One	Sourcebook for Salish-Shidhe, Sioux, Ute, and Pueblo Council Nations. Also includes adventure "Peacekeeper"
7203	1-55560-131-6	1st	1991	2052	London Sourcebook	A guide to London and information on other British sprawls, the countryside of United Kingdom and Tír na nÓg, formerly known as Ireland.
7204	1-55560-186-3	2nd	1993	2054	Germany Sourcebook	A guide to the Allied German States.
7206	1-55560-135-9	1st	1990	2052	The Neo-Anarchist's Guide to North America	Guide to the major cities of North America. (Atlanta, Chicago, Dallas/Fort Worth, New York, San Francisco, and Washington DC).
7207	1-55560-158-8	1st	1991	2052	Native American Nations Volume Two	Sourcebook for Algonkian-Manitoo Council, Athabascan Council, Trans-Polar Aleut Council, and the Tsimshian Nations. Also includes adventure "Eye of the Eagle".
7208	1-55560-165-0	1st and 2nd	1992	2053	Neo-Anarchists Guide to Real Life	Sourcebook of "Real Life" for citizens in Seattle.
7209	1-55560-193-6	2nd	1996	2057	California Free State	Sourcebook of California Free State region.
7210	1-55560-197-9	2nd	1993	2054	Tir Tairngire	A guide to Tír Tairngire, an elven nation located in former Oregon.
7211	1-55560-209-6	2nd	1993	2054	Tír na nÓg	A guide to the former Ireland.
7212	1-55560-236-3	2nd	1994	2055	Denver: The City of Shadows	A boxed set guide to the city of Denver.
7213	1-55560-257-6	2nd	1995	2056	Aztlán	A guide to Aztlán, formerly known as Mexico.
7214	1-55560-314-9	2nd	1997	2058	Target: UCAS	A guidebook detailing the political system of the UCAS, Boston, Chicago and Detroit.
7215	1-55560-341-6	2nd	1998	2059	Target: Smuggler Havens	A guidebook to New Orleans and Vladivostok and smuggling hotspots.
7216, 10657, 25009	1-55560-342-4 (FASA); 3-89064-657-3 (FanPro)	3rd	1999 (FASA); 2001 (FanPro)	2060	New Seattle	A guidebook to Seattle in the year 2060.
7219	1-55560-476-5	3rd	2000	2061	Target: Matrix	Sourcebook detailing Matrix grids for various lesser organizations.
7900	1-55560-196-0	2nd	1992	2053	Shadowrun Second Edition	Hardcover edition.
7901	1-55560-180-4	2nd	1992	2053	Shadowrun Second Edition	Softcover edition.
7902	1-55560-185-5	2nd	1994	2053	Shadowrun GM Screen	Bundled with the "Contacts" sourcebook.
7903	1-55560-190-1	2nd	1992	2053	Grimoire	Core magic rules updated to Second Edition with content from London Sourcebook, and The Universal Brotherhood books.
7904	1-55560-271-1	2nd	1995	2056	Virtual Realities 2.0	Core hacking rules.
7905	1-55560-298-3	2nd	1996	2057	Shadowrun Companion: Beyond the Shadows	Core rules supplement: miscellaneous rules; revised edition in 1999.
7906	1-55560-304-1	2nd	1997	2055	Rigger 2	Core vehicle and rigging rules.
7000	-	3rd	1998	2060	Shadowrun Third Edition	Limited to 1,000 numbered hardcovers.
7001, 10660, 25000	1-55560-371-8 (FASA); 1-932564-46-2 (FanPro)	3rd	1998 (FASA); 2004 (FanPro)	2060	Shadowrun Third Edition	Softcover edition
7002, 25008	1-55560-369-6 (FASA); PDF only (FanPro)	3rd	1998 (FASA); 2004 (FanPro)	2060	Shadowrun Gamemaster Screen	Bundled with Critters Sourcebook.
7003	1-55560-383-1 (FASA); PDF only (FanPro)	3rd	1999 (FASA); 2005 (FanPro)	2060	Shadowrun Quick Start Rules	Simplified Third Edition rules.
7126, 10663, 25001	1-55560-363-7 (FASA); 1-932564-07-1 (FanPro)	3rd	1999 (FASA); 2004 (FanPro)	2061	Man & Machine	Core cyberware rules.
7905, 10656, 25010	1-55560-380-7 (FASA); 1-932564-48-9 (FanPro)	3rd	1999 (FASA); 2004 (FanPro)	2060	Shadowrun Companion ('revised)	Core rules supplement containing miscellaneous rules.
7907, 10658	1-55560-358-0 (FASA)	3rd	1999 (FASA)	2050	Magic in the Shadows	Core magic rules.
7908, 10659	1-55560-375-0 (FASA); 1-932564-14-4 (FanPro)	3rd	2000 (FASA); 2003 (FanPro)	2061	Cannon Companion	Core weapon rules
7909	1-55560-401-3	3rd	2000	2061	Matrix	Core hacking rules.
7910, 10662	978-1-555604-02-8 (FASA); 978-1-932564-04-4 (FanPro)	3rd	2001-04 (FASA); 2003-09-01 (FanPro)	2061	Rigger 3	Core vehicle and rigging rules. FanPro version is a Revised Edition. It is called Rigger 3 Revised.
26000	1-932564-66-7 (FanPro); 978-0-9792047-8-4 (Catalyst)	4th	2005-10 (FanPro); 2008-02 (Catalyst)	2070	Shadowrun Fourth Edition	Core rulebook.
26001		4th		2070	Shadowrun Fourth Edition	Core limited edition with a print run of 1,000 numbered copies.
2600A	978-1-934857-31-1	4th	2009-08	2072	Shadowrun Fourth Edition, 20th Anniversary	Revised core rules with references to previously published Fourth edition books, index, with additional art and fiction
2600LE		4th		2072	Shadowrun Fourth Edition, 20th Anniversary	Print run limited to 1,500 numbered copies.
26002	1-932564-64-0	4th	2006-12	2070	Shadowrun Gamemaster's Screen	with contacts and adventure guidelines
SR4QS; 26FRP12	PDF only Booklet	4th	2011-02-10; 2012-06-18	2070	Quick Start Rules	Simplified rules for 4th Edition and for 20th Anniversary Edition. The first one contains the Food Fight 4.0 Introductory Scenario, the second one is made for Free RPG Day 2012 and it contains the A Night on the Town scenario.
	PDF only	3rd & 4th	2005	2070	SR3 to SR4 Character Conversion Guide	The rules of the third and fourth editions are significantly different, however the designers created a converter. This solution is not perfect, so they advise to create a new character from scratch.
26004 & 26001	1-932564-67-5 (FanPro); 978-1-934857-11-3 (Catalyst)	4th	2006-12 (FanPro); 2008-09 (Catalyst)	2070-04-11	Street Magic	Core Magic Rulebook. Expands magic rules + new traditions, spells, adept powers, spirits, and more. Directly expanded by PDF-only Digital Grimoire.
26002	978-0-9792047-7-7	4th	2008-01	2070-08-20	Augmentation	Core cyberware & bioware rulebook. Expanded implants rules for cyberware, bioware and body modification.
26003	978-1-934857-05-2	4th	2008-01	2071-04-20	Arsenal	Core gear rulebook. Expanded combat rules and details on weapons, implants, drones, and more.
26004	978-1-934857-08-3	4th	2008-08-23	2071-05-09	Unwired	Core Matrix rulebook with expanded hacking rules.
26005	978-1-934857-09-0	4th	2008-08-23	2071-07-15	Runner's Companion	Miscellaneous rules
26600	PDF only	4th	2008-11-14	2070	Digital Grimoire	Core rules supplement. Classified as part of the "supplement" line. Additional magic rules that expand Street Magic.
26S001	PDF only	4th	2010-10-29; 2013	2072-07-30	This Old Drone	Supplement on drones. Classified as part of the "supplement" line. The second date is for the Revised version.
26S002	PDF only	4th	2011-01-22	2073-02-20	Mil Spec Tech	Supplement on vehicles.
26S006	PDF only	4th	2011-12-20	2073-12-14	State of the Art: 2073	Data dump for 2073, with lore, vehicles, gear, characters and other stuff.
26S007	PDF only	4th	2011-04-27	2072-08-30	Way of the Adept	Part of the "Shadowrun Options" line.
26S009	PDF only	4th	2011-05-27	2072-09-12	Unfriendly Skies	Vehicle supplement
26S010	PDF only	4th	2011-06-11	2073-06-15	Gun Heaven	Released before Gun Heaven 2, but in-game dated to few months later.
26S011	PDF only	4th	2011-07-02	2073-07-23	Deadly Waves	A supplement detailing water vehicles.
26S013	PDF only	4th	2012-02-15	2074-08-28	Safehouses	"CYA Tips for Shadowrunners"
26S016	PDF only	4th	2012-05-16	2072-11-29	Gun Heaven 2	This was supplement was released after Gun Heaven, but in-game dated to few months earlier.
26S017	PDF only	4th	2013-01-12	2075-01-12	The Way of the Samurai	A supplement in the "Shadowrun Options" line.
26S018	PDF only	4th	2013-05-30	2075-02-20	Euro War Antiques	A gear and vehicle supplement.
26S019	PDF only	4th	2012-06-13	2074-02-28	Used Car Lot	A supplement detailing vehicles.
26S021	PDF only	4th	2012-07-24	2074-07-27	Mil Spec Tech 2	A supplement detailing military vehicles and weapons.
26S027	PDF only	4th & 5th	2014-06-02	2076	Bullets & Bandages	A supplement concerning field medicine.
26S040	PDF only	4th & 5th	2013-12-14	2075	Gun H(e)aven 3	
26S0404A	PDF only	4th	2013-12-27	2075	Gun H(e)aven 3 Weapon Cards (SR4A Stats)	These 33 weapon cards feature guns first seen in the recently released Gun H(e)aven 3.
26S0405	PDF only	5th	2013-12-27	2075	Gun H(e)aven 3 Weapon Cards (SR5 Stats)	These 33 weapon cards feature guns first seen in the recently released Gun H(e)aven 3.
26104	978-1-936876-11-2	4th	2011-09-14		Runner's Black Book	Collecting "This Old Drone", "MilSpec Tech", "Unfriendly Skies", "Gun Heaven" and "Deadly Waves" with some new material.
26105	978-1-936876-26-6	4th	2012-09-26	2074	Runner's Black Book 2074	Collecting "Gun H(e)aven 2", "Used Car Lot", "MilSpec Tech 2" and "Euro War Antiques " with some new material.
27000	978-1-936876-51-8 English; 978-3-941976-67-2 German	5th	2013-09-25	2075	Shadowrun, Fifth Edition	Core rulebook.
27000LE	978-1-936876-70-9 English; 978-3-941976-68-9 German	5th	2013-09-28	2075	Shadowrun, Fifth Edition	An edition limited to 1,000 numbered copies
27050	978-1-936876-91-4	5th	2013-11-09	2075	Shadowrun Gamemaster's Screen	
27QSR	PDF only	5th	2013-07-09	2075	Shadowrun Quick Start Rules	Simplified 5th Edition rules
27CCG	PDF only	4th & 5th	2013-07-16	2075	Character Conversion Guide	The rules of the fourth and fifth editions are not significantly different, so the designers created a converter.
27002	978-1-936876-55-6	5th	2014-04-09	2075	Run & Gun	The core combat rulebook.
27003	978-1-936876-63-1	5th	2014-06-30	2075	Street Grimoire	A core magic rulebook with new magic rules with new traditions, spells, adept powers and spirits.
27004, 27400S	978-1-941582-86-2; 978-1-942487-55-5	5th	2015-02-18; 2017-03-22	2076	Run Faster	Core character rulebook with miscellaneous rules. Second Catalog Nr, ISBN and publish date is for the Second printing, which has corrections and different cover page too.
27007	978-1-941582-99-2	5th	2015-12-17	2077	Rigger 5.0	Core rigger handbook with miscellaneous rules and gears.
27008	978-1-942487-51-7	5th	2016-05-24	2077	Howling Shadows	Core critter handbook.
27009	978-1-942487-54-8	5th	2016-07-22	2078	Court of Shadows	Alternate setting sourcebook emphasizing the magic and intrigue of the Seelie Court.
27011	978-1-942487-65-4	5th	2017-05-02	2079	Forbidden Arcana	Advanced Magic Rulebook.
7127, 10650	1-55560-390-4 (FASA); 3-89064-650-6 (FanPro)	3rd	2000 (FASA); 2003 (FanPro)	2061	Year of the Comet	A guide to the year 2061, one of the most eventful in Third Edition.
10651	3-89064-651-4	3rd	2003-09	2062	Target: Awakened Lands	A guidebook on Australia and on magical sites worldwide.
10652	1-55560-426-9 (FASA); 3-89064-652-2 (FanPro)	3rd	2002 (FASA); 2003 (FanPro)	2062	Threats 2	A guidebook to individuals and groups antagonistic to player characters.
10653	3-89064-653-0	3rd	2003	2062	Target: Wastelands	A guidebook on various ecodisasters and naturally inhospitable places.
10655, 25015	3-89064-655-7; 1-932564-62-4	3rd	2003; 2004	2062	Shadows of North America	A guidebook to North America in 2062.
10664, 25013	3-89064-664-6; 1-932564-42-X	3rd	2002; 2004	2063	State of the Art: 2063	A guidebook with new rules for genetic engineering, new magic, mercenary work, security measures, and pop culture in the year 2062..
10666	3-89064-666-2	3rd	2003-10-01	2063	Dragons of the Sixth World	A guidebook with dossiers on the known great dragons as well as new rules for dragons and PC drakes first introduced in Threats 2.
10667	1-932564-00-4	3rd	2004-02-01	2063	Sprawl Survival Guide	A guidebook details on everyday life in 2063 with expanded lifestyle rules.
10673	1-932564-01-2	3rd	2003	2064	Shadowrun Character Dossier	16 page character record sheets.
25002	1-932564-10-1	3rd	2004	2063	Shadows of Europe	A guidebook with details on Europe in 2063.
25003	1-932564-13-6	3rd	2004	2064	Mr. Johnson's Little Black Book	A collection of NPC contacts and rules for reputation.
25004	1-932564-43-8	3rd	2004	2064	State of the Art: 2064	A guidebook with fiction and rules for espionage, adepts, law enforcement, European magical traditions, and pop culture of the year 2063.
25006	1-932564-44-6	3rd	2005	2064	Loose Alliances	A guidebook with details on factions in Shadowrun, new rules for certain groups and expanded rules for Divination metamagic.
25007	1-932564-22-5	3rd	2005	2064	Shadows of Asia	A guidebook with details on Asia and the Indian subcontinent in 2064.
25011	1-932564-51-9	3rd	2005	2064	Shadows of Latin America	Unpublished, drafts released by the authors. On 16 January 2010, the current Shadowrun Line Developer stated that Shadows of Latin America would not be published. Plans by the writers to self-publish did not succeed, and several writers made their final drafts available for non-commercial use.
25014	1-932564-55-1	3rd	2005	2064	System Failure	Fiction and adventures leading up to the end of the Shadowrun Third Edition and the second Matrix crash.
26005	1-932564-68-3	4th	2006	2070	Runner Havens	A guidebook describing Seattle and Hong Kong, and to a lesser extent Caracas, Istanbul, Hamburg and Cape Town.
26101	978-1-934857-44-1	4th	2009-09-16	2072	Running Wild	A "Core supplement" for the Fourth Edition.
26201	978-1-934857-00-7	4th	2008-02-20	2071	Corporate Enclaves	A guidebook with details about Los Angeles and Neo-Tokyo. Blurbs on Dubai, Europort, Manhattan, Nairobi, and Tenochtitlan.
26202	978-1-934857-12-0	4th	2009-01-01	2071	Feral Cities	A guidebook covering Chicago and Lagos and less detailed information on Bogotá, GeMiTo, Geneva, Karavan, and Sarajevo.
26203	978-1-934857-45-8	4th	2010-03-03	2072	Vice	A guidebook to organized crime.
26240	978-1-934857-58-8	4th	2009-11-11	2072	Seattle 2072	An updated Seattle sourcebook.
26602	PDF only	4th	2009-03-21	2071	The Rotten Apple: Manhattan	This setting is a crucial part of the New York City Shadowrun Missions campaign (SRM03XX). This 32-page volume serves as a guide to players so that they can prepare their characters to deal with the finer details of the setting.
26221	978-1-934857-63-2	4th	2010-06-01	2072-05-09	Corporate Guide	A guidebook to corporations.
26301	978-0-9792047-5-3	4th	2007	2070	Emergence	A guidebook partly composed of a setting framework and partly describing an overall plot.
26302	978-1-934857-06-9	4th	2009-01-21	2071	Ghost Cartels	A work partly describing setting and partly a campaign framework.
26205	978-1-934857-82-3	4th	2010-10-20	2072	Sixth World Almanac	A guidebook with briefs on many (but not all) countries.
26241	978-1-934857-22-9	4th	2011-04-27	2073	Attitude	A guidebook to media, professional sports, BTL (virtual reality), media piracy, clothing and accessories.
26206	978-1-934857-68-7	4th	2011-02-02	2073	War!	A guidebook describing the conflict between the Aztlan and Amazonia, the war-torn city of Bogotá and overviews on Poland, the Council of Marienbad, Somalia, Nepal and the city of Albuquerque in the Pueblo Corporate Council.
26207	978-1-936876-06-8	4th	2011-05-18	2073	Spy Games	An updated Denver location sourcebook.
26208	978-1-934857-90-8	4th	2012-01-25	2073	Conspiracy Theories	Sourcebook of convoluted plots with lots of intrigue.
26209	978-1-934857-94-6	4th	2011-08-03	2073-08-14	Street Legends	A guidebook with descriptions of NPCs of the Sixth World, with their gaming stats.
26S015	PDF only	4th	2012-01-02	2073-12-21	Street Legends Supplemental	Another guidebook with descriptions of NPCs of the Sixth World, with their gaming stats.
26APR3p	PDF only	4th	2012-04-01	2074-04-01	Street Legends: Home Edition	Some funny NPCs. You can be April's Fool if you use them.
26APR13	PDF only	4th	2013-04-01	2074-04-01	Rigger 4	Some funny vehicles. You can be April's Fool if you use them.
26S014	PDF only	4th	2012-06-15	2074-05-28	Magical Societies	Sourcebook of Magical Societies
26S003	PDF only	4th	2011-03-11	2072-08-19	Parazoology	A Shadowrun Critter Supplement.
26S012	PDF only	4th	2012-04-17	2074-04-21	Parabotany	A Shadowrun Flora Supplement.
26S020	PDF only	4th	2012-11-27	2074-11-23	Parageology	A Shadowrun Rock Supplement.
26S024	PDF only	4th	2013-03-13	2074-12-27	Sim Dreams & Nightmares	A guide to simsense.
26S026	PDF only	4th	2012-12-18	2074-12-13	Montreal 2074	A sourcebook for Montreal and surrounding Quebec region.
26S035	PDF only	5th	2013-12-14	2075-11-30	Coyotes	A sourcebook which describes human smuggling.
26S032	PDF only	4th & 5th	2014-11-29	2076-11-04	Aetherology	A sourcebook for metaplanes.
26S048	PDF only	5th	2014-09-25	2076-09-02	Shadow Spells	A sourcebook for spells.
26S033	PDF only	4th	2013-08-28	2075-08-03	Parazoology 2	A Shadowrun Critter Supplement.
26S034	PDF only	4th	2013-02-25	2075-06-15	10 Mercs	A Sourcebook of Mercenary Units and their members.
26S043	PDF only	5th	2015-02-17	2077-02-15	Shadows in Focus: Cheyenne	A guide to the Cheyenne sprawl in the Sioux Nation.
26S038	PDF only	5th	2016-10-22	2078-10-18	Shadows in Focus: City by Shadow: Metrópole	A guide to the Metrópole sprawl.
26S042	PDF only	5th	2015-01-06	2076-12-20	Shadows in Focus: Sioux Nation	A guide to the Sioux Nation.
26210	978-1-936876-20-4	4th	2012-06-20	2078-04-28	Hazard Pay	A guidebook describing extreme environments including deserts, cold areas, underseas, and outer space.
26211	978-1-936876-23-5	4th	2012-09-05	2074-07-20	The Clutch of Dragons	A sourcebook about dragons.
26212	978-1-936876-29-7	4th	2012-12-15	2074-11-02	Dirty Tricks	A sourcebbok about politics in the Sixth World.
26213	978-1-936876-50-1	4th	2013-03-13	2075-01-18	Storm Front	A sourcebook with setting information and a campaign framework.
26100	978-1-934857-43-4	4th	2011-08-17		Runner's Toolkit	A boxed supplement to the core game that includes a game-master's screen, a starter adventure and quick-reference cards.
26504	PDF only	4th	2010-02-15	2071	10 Gangs	Profiles of ten famous gangs.
26651	PDF only	4th	2010-03-01	2072	10 Jackpointers	Profiles of ten famous shadowrunners.
26230	978-1-936876-44-0	4th	2012-09-19	2050	Shadowrun 2050	A historical setting sourcebook, updating the world of 2050 for 4th edition 20th anniversary rules.
26451	978-1-934857-91-5	4th	2012-03-07	2073-12-13	Corporate Intrigue	A campaign book containing both setting information and a campaign framework.
26452	978-1-936876-01-3	4th	2012-04-04	2074-02-07	Jet Set	A campaign book.
27101	978-1-936876-92-1	5th	2014-04-23	2075	Beginner Box Set	A boxed supplement to the core game that includes a quick-start guide, a quick adventure and an exploration booklet.
27102	978-1-936876-93-8	5th	2014-04-23	2075	Runner's Toolkit – Alphaware	A boxed supplement to the core game which includes a GMs screen and several maps and six adventures set in Seattle.
27100X	PDF only	5th	2014-01-30	2075	Digital Tools Box	Before the Beginner Box Set and the Runner's Toolkit published, the content of these was published digitally. It contains additionally the excerpt of the Fire & Frost novel.
7205	1-55560-024-7	1st	1990	2051	Universal Brotherhood	A huge datadump and an adventure called Missing Blood.
7301	1-55560-113-8	1st	1989	2050-12-12	DNA/DOA	An adventure.
7302	1-55560-116-2	1st	1989	2050	Mercurial	An adventure.
7303	1-55560-120-0	1st	1989	2050-08-17	Dreamchipper	An adventure.
7304	1-55560-117-0	1st	1990	2050	Queen Euphoria	An adventure.
7305	1-55560-124-3	1st	1990	2050	Bottled Demon	An adventure.
7306	1-55560-125-1	1st	1990	2050	Harlequin	A series of intertwined adventures.
7307	1-55560-137-5	1st	1991	2051	Dragon Hunt	An adventure.
7308	1-55560-151-0	1st	1991	2051	Total Eclipse	An adventure.
7309	1-55560-150-2	1st and 2nd	1992	2053	Imago	An adventure.
7310	1-55560-170-7	1st	1991	2053-05-20	Elven Fire	An adventure.
7311	1-55560-145-6	1st	1991	2051-06-08	Ivy & Chrome	An adventure.
7312	1-55560-192-8	1st and 2nd	1992	2053-08-25	One Stage Before	An adventure.
7313	1-55560-194-4	1st and 2nd	1993	2054	Dark Angel	An adventure.
7314	1-55560-195-2	1st and 2nd	1993	2054-06-10	A Killing Glare	An adventure.
7315	1-55560-221-5	1st and 2nd	1993	2054	Celtic Double-Cross	An adventure.
7316	1-55560-232-0	1st and 2nd	1994	2055	Eye Witness	An adventure.
7317	1-55560-227-4	2nd	1994	2055	Paradise Lost	An adventure.
7318	1-55560-233-9	2nd	1994	2055	Divided Assets	An adventure.
7319	1-55560-240-1	1st and 2nd	1994	2055	Double Exposure	An adventure.
7320	1-55560-248-7	2nd	1994	2055	Harlequin's Back	A series of adventures relating to everyone's favourite Laughing Elf.
7322	1-55560-303-3	2nd	1996	2057	Super Tuesday!	A series of unrelated adventures in the shadow of the 2057 special election.
7323	1-55560-307-6	2nd	1996	Summer 2057	Shadows of the Underworld	Several adventures set in the summer before the 2057 special election.
7324	1-55560-294-0	2nd	1998	2059	Predator and Prey	An adventure.
7325	1-55560-181-2	2nd	1997	2058	Missions	A series of adventures.
7326	1-55560-328-9	2nd	1997	2058	Mob War!	A series of plot hooks relating to the death of a Mafia Don.
7327	1-55560-346-7	2nd	1998	2057-2060	Blood in the Boardroom	A series of interrelated plot hooks relating to various megacorporations.
7328	1-55560-347-5	3rd	1998	2060	Renraku Arcology: Shutdown	An adventure setting.
7329	1-55560-323-8	3rd	1999	2061	First Run	Three adventures meant to introduce players and gamemasters to Shadowrun 3rd edition.
7330	1-55560-385-8	3rd	2000	2060	Corporate Punishment	Three different adventures with corporate settings.
7331	1-55560-410-2	3rd	2000	2061	Brainscan	Five adventures linked by a single story, taking place after the events in Renraku Arcology: Shutdown.
10654	3-89064-654-9	3rd	2003-06-01	2062	Wake of the Comet	Three adventures related to the return of Halley's Comet.
10665	3-89064-665-4	3rd	2003	2062	Survival of the Fittest	Campaign with seven adventures related together and tied to Year of the Comet and Corporate Punishment.
SRM0001	PDF only	3rd	2004		Shadowrun Missions: Mission Briefing	First adventure of the Shadowrun Missions campaign 1st season and also the first part of the Seattle Story Arc 1. It is separated in two files. One is for GMs and one for players.
SRM0002	PDF only	3rd	2004		Shadowrun Missions: Demolition Run	Second adventure of the Shadowrun Missions campaign 1st season and also the second part of the Seattle Story Arc 1. It is separated in two files. One is for GMs and one for players.
SRM0003	PDF only	3rd	2004		Shadowrun Missions: FORCEd RECON	Third adventure of the Shadowrun Missions campaign 1st season and also the third part of the Seattle Story Arc 1. It is also part of the Griffin Biotechnology sub-story arc. It is separated in two files. One is for GMs and one for players.
SRM0004	PDF only	3rd	2004		Shadowrun Missions: A Fork in Fate's Path	Forth adventure of the Shadowrun Missions campaign 1st season and also the fourth part of the Seattle Story Arc 1. It is separated in two files. One is for GMs and one for players.
SRM0005	PDF only	3rd	2004		Shadowrun Missions: A Dark and Stormy Night	Fifth adventure of the Shadowrun Missions campaign 1st season and also the fifth part of the Seattle Story Arc 1. It is separated in two files. One is for GMs and one for players.
SRM0101	PDF only	3rd	2004		Shadowrun Missions: Double Cross	Sixth adventure of the Shadowrun Missions campaign 1st season and the first part of the Rose Croix Story Arc. It is separated in two files. One is for GMs and one for players.
SRM0102	PDF only	3rd	2004		Shadowrun Missions: Strings Attached	Seventh adventure of the Shadowrun Missions campaign 1st season and the second part of the Rose Croix Story Arc. It is separated in two files. One is for GMs and one for players.
SRM0103	PDF only	3rd	2004		Shadowrun Missions: Harvest Time	Eighth adventure of the Shadowrun Missions campaign 1st season and the third part of the Rose Croix Story Arc. It is separated in two files. One is for GMs and one for players.
SRM0104	PDF only	3rd	2004		Shadowrun Missions: The Gambler	Ninth adventure of the Shadowrun Missions campaign 1st season and the fourth part of the Rose Croix Story Arc. It is also part of the Griffin Biotechnology sub-story arc. It is separated in two files. One is for GMs and one for players.
SRM0105	PDF only	3rd	2005		Shadowrun Missions: A Walk In The Park	Tenth adventure of the Shadowrun Missions campaign 1st season and the fifth part of the Rose Croix Story Arc. It is separated in two files. One is for GMs and one for players.
SRM0106	PDF only	3rd	2005		Shadowrun Missions: Lost and Found	Eleventh adventure of the Shadowrun Missions campaign 1st season and the sixth part of the Rose Croix Story Arc. It is separated in two files. One is for GMs and one for players.
SRM0107	PDF only	3rd	2005		Shadowrun Missions: Keys to the Asylum	Twelfth adventure of the Shadowrun Missions campaign 1st season and the seventh part of the Rose Croix Story Arc. It is separated in two files. One is for GMs and one for players.
SRM0108	PDF only	3rd	2005		Shadowrun Missions: Duplicity	Thirteenth adventure of the Shadowrun Missions campaign 1st season and the eighth part of the Rose Croix Story Arc. It is also part of the Griffin Biotechnology sub-story arc. It is separated in two files. One is for GMs and one for players.
SRM0109	PDF only	3rd	2005		Shadowrun Missions: For Whom the Bell Tolls	Fourteenth adventure of the Shadowrun Missions campaign 1st season and the ninth part of the Rose Croix Story Arc. It is separated in two files. One is for GMs and one for players.
26003	1-932564-65-9	4th	2006		On The Run	An adventure not reprinted by CGL, who used the SKU for Arsenal.
26400	978-1-934857-46-5	4th	2009-08-19		Dawn of the Artifacts 1: Dusk	An adventure.
26401	978-1-934857-47-2	4th	2010-03-16		Dawn of the Artifacts 2: Midnight	An adventure.
26402	978-1-934857-61-8	4th	2010-10-27		Dawn of the Artifacts 3: Darkest Hour	An adventure.
26403	978-1-934857-62-5	4th	2011-10-26		Dawn of the Artifacts 4: New Dawn	An adventure.
26450	978-1-934857-75-5	4th	2011-12-07		Artifacts Unbound	An adventure.
26405	978-1-934857-77-9	4th	2011-04-02		Horizon Adventure 1: A Fistful of Credsticks	An adventure.
26406	978-1-934857-92-2	4th	2011-11-09		Horizon Adventure 2: Anarchy: Subsidized	An adventure.
26407	978-1-934857-95-3	4th	2012-02-08		Horizon Adventure 3: Colombian Subterfuge	An adventure.
26453	978-1-936876-00-6	4th	2012-05-02		The Twilight Horizon	A campaign book.
26408	978-1-934857-93-9	4th	2012-05-09		Boardroom Backstabs 1: Damage Control	An adventure.
27480	978-1-936876-72-3	4th & 5th	2013-07-11	2075	Sprawl Wilds	A convention missions compilation of four Seattle adventures.
26601	PDF only	4th	2009-02-11		Bad Moon Rising in the East	An adventure.
26S025	PDF only	4th	2012-09-05		The Land of Promise	Sourcebook describing Tír Tairngire with adventure seeds and character profiles.
SRM0201	PDF only	4th	2006		Shadowrun Missions: Parliament of Thieves	First adventure of the Shadowrun Missions campaign 2nd season (Denver Story Arc). It is separated in two files. One is for GMs and one for players.
SRM0202	PDF only	4th	2006		Shadowrun Missions: Best Served Cold	Second adventure of the Shadowrun Missions campaign 2nd season (Denver Story Arc). It is separated in two files. One is for GMs and one for players.
SRM0203	PDF only	4th	2006		Shadowrun Missions: The Grab	Third adventure of the Shadowrun Missions campaign 2nd season (Denver Story Arc). It is separated in two files. One is for GMs and one for players.
SRM0204	PDF only	4th	2006		Shadowrun Missions: Thrash the Body Electric	Fourth adventure of the Shadowrun Missions campaign 2nd season (Denver Story Arc). It is separated in two files. One is for GMs and one for players.
SRM0205	PDF only	4th	2006		Shadowrun Missions: Through a Rose Colored Display Link	Fifth adventure of the Shadowrun Missions campaign 2nd season (Denver Story Arc). It is separated in two files. One is for GMs and one for players.
SRM0206	PDF only	4th	2006		Shadowrun Missions: The Flip Side	Sixth adventure of the Shadowrun Missions campaign 2nd season (Denver Story Arc). It is separated in two files. One is for GMs and one for players.
SRM0207	PDF only	4th	2006		Shadowrun Missions: An Ounce of Prevention	Seventh adventure of the Shadowrun Missions campaign 2nd season (Denver Story Arc). It is separated in two files. One is for GMs and one for players.
SRM0208	PDF only	4th	2006		Shadowrun Missions: Chasing the Dragon	Eighth adventure of the Shadowrun Missions campaign 2nd season (Denver Story Arc). It is also part of The Dragon Stone sub-story arc. It is separated in two files. One is for GMs and one for players.
SRM0209	PDF only	4th	2006		Shadowrun Missions: Tunnel Vision	Ninth adventure of the Shadowrun Missions campaign 2nd season (Denver Story Arc). It is separated in two files. One is for GMs and one for players.
SRM0210	PDF only	4th	2006		Shadowrun Missions: Twist and Insult	Tenth adventure of the Shadowrun Missions campaign 2nd season (Denver Story Arc). It is separated in two files. One is for GMs and one for players.
SRM0211	PDF only	4th	2006		Shadowrun Missions: Rising Sin	Eleventh adventure of the Shadowrun Missions campaign 2nd season (Denver Story Arc). It is separated in two files. One is for GMs and one for players.
SRM0212	PDF only	4th	2007		Shadowrun Missions: Winter Wonderland	Twelfth adventure of the Shadowrun Missions campaign 2nd season (Denver Story Arc). It is separated in two files. One is for GMs and one for players.
SRM0213	PDF only	4th	2007		Shadowrun Missions: Take-Out Service	Thirteenth adventure of the Shadowrun Missions campaign 2nd season (Denver Story Arc). It is separated in two files. One is for GMs and one for players.
SRM0214	PDF only	4th	2007		Shadowrun Missions: Wetwork, Pure and Simple	Fourteenth adventure of the Shadowrun Missions campaign 2nd season (Denver Story Arc). It is also part of The Decline and Fall of Xeverus Cosmetics sub-story arc. It is separated in two files. One is for GMs and one for players.
SRM0215	PDF only	4th	2007		Shadowrun Missions: Critical care	Fifteenth adventure of the Shadowrun Missions campaign 2nd season (Denver Story Arc). It is separated in two files. One is for GMs and one for players.
SRM0216	PDF only	4th	2007		Shadowrun Missions: Primal Forces	Sixteenth adventure of the Shadowrun Missions campaign 2nd season (Denver Story Arc). It is separated in two files. One is for GMs and one for players.
SRM0217	PDF only	4th	2007		Shadowrun Missions: Patient Zero	Seventeenth adventure of the Shadowrun Missions campaign 2nd season (Denver Story Arc). It is separated in two files. One is for GMs and one for players.
SRM0218	PDF only	4th	2007		Shadowrun Missions: A Very Bad Day	Eighteenth adventure of the Shadowrun Missions campaign 2nd season (Denver Story Arc). It is separated in two files. One is for GMs and one for players.
SRM0219	PDF only	4th	2007		Shadowrun Missions: By Any Means Necessary	Nineteenth adventure of the Shadowrun Missions campaign 2nd season (Denver Story Arc). It is separated in two files. One is for GMs and one for players.
SRM0220	PDF only	4th	2007		Shadowrun Missions: Career Path	Twentieth adventure of the Shadowrun Missions campaign 2nd season (Denver Story Arc). It is separated in two files. One is for GMs and one for players.
SRM0221	PDF only	4th	2007		Shadowrun Missions: Happenstance	Twenty-first adventure of the Shadowrun Missions campaign 2nd season (Denver Story Arc). It is also part of The Decline and Fall of Xeverus Cosmetics sub-story arc. It is separated in two files. One is for GMs and one for players.
SRM0222	PDF only	4th	2007		Shadowrun Missions: Backlash	Twenty-second adventure of the Shadowrun Missions campaign 2nd season (Denver Story Arc). It is separated in two files. One is for GMs and one for players.
SRM0223	PDF only	4th	2007		Shadowrun Missions: Prodigal Son	Twenty-third adventure of the Shadowrun Missions campaign 2nd season (Denver Story Arc). It is also part of The Decline and Fall of Xeverus Cosmetics sub-story arc. It is separated in two files. One is for GMs and one for players.
SRM0224	PDF only	4th	2007		Shadowrun Missions: Hubris and Humility	Twenty-fourth adventure of the Shadowrun Missions campaign 2nd season (Denver Story Arc). It is also part of The Dragon Stone sub-story arc. It is separated in two files. One is for GMs and one for players.
SRM0225	PDF only	4th	2007		Shadowrun Missions: Done Deal	Twenty-fifth adventure of the Shadowrun Missions campaign 2nd season (Denver Story Arc). It is also part of The Dragon Stone sub-story arc. It is separated in two files. One is for GMs and one for players.
SRM0300	PDF only	4th	2009-03-22		Shadowrun Missions: Everyone's Your Friend	First adventure of the Shadowrun Missions campaign 3rd season (New York Story Arc).
SRM0301	PDF only	4th	2009-04-24		Shadowrun Missions: Ready, Set, Gogh!	Second adventure of the Shadowrun Missions campaign 3rd season (New York Story Arc).
SRM0302	PDF only	4th	2009-05-16		Shadowrun Missions: Block War	Third adventure of the Shadowrun Missions campaign 3rd season (New York Story Arc).
SRM0303	PDF only	4th	2009-06-20		Shadowrun Missions: Burning Bridges	Fourth adventure of the Shadowrun Missions campaign 3rd season (New York Story Arc).
SRM0304	PDF only	4th	2009-08-01		Shadowrun Missions: Monkeywrench	Fifth adventure of the Shadowrun Missions campaign 3rd season (New York Story Arc).
SRM0305	PDF only	4th	2009-11-24		Shadowrun Missions: In and Out	Sixth adventure of the Shadowrun Missions campaign 3rd season (New York Story Arc).
SRM0306	PDF only	4th	2010-01-19		Shadowrun Missions: Jackknifed!	Seventh adventure of the Shadowrun Missions campaign 3rd season (New York Story Arc).
SRM0307	PDF only	4th	2010-02-15		Shadowrun Missions: Knight at the Opera	Eighth adventure of the Shadowrun Missions campaign 3rd season (New York Story Arc).
SRM0308	PDF only	4th	2010-07-17		Shadowrun Missions: Firestorm	Ninth adventure of the Shadowrun Missions campaign 3rd season (New York Story Arc).
SRM0309	PDF only	4th	2010-08-28		Shadowrun Missions: Something Completely Different	Tenth adventure of the Shadowrun Missions campaign 3rd season (New York Story Arc).
SRM0310	PDF only	4th	2010-09-20		Shadowrun Missions: Spin Control	Eleventh adventure of the Shadowrun Missions campaign 3rd season (New York Story Arc).
SRM0311	PDF only	4th	2010-10-29		Shadowrun Missions: Food Poisoning	Twelfth adventure of the Shadowrun Missions campaign 3rd season (New York Story Arc).
SRM0312	PDF only	4th	2010-11-24		Shadowrun Missions: Elevator Ride to Hell	Thirteenth adventure of the Shadowrun Missions campaign 3rd season (New York Story Arc).
SRM0400	PDF only	4th	2011-01-17		Shadowrun Missions: Back in Business	First adventure of the Shadowrun Missions campaign 4th season (Seattle Story Arc 2).
SRM0401	PDF only	4th	2011-03-23		Shadowrun Missions: Hiding in the Dark	Second adventure of the Shadowrun Missions campaign 4th season (Seattle Story Arc 2). It is also part of the Buried Underground sub-story arc.
SRM0402	PDF only	4th	2011-05-12		Shadowrun Missions: Extraction	Third adventure of the Shadowrun Missions campaign 4th season (Seattle Story Arc 2). It is also part of the Artifact Rush sub-story arc.
SRM0403	PDF only	4th	2011-07-14		Shadowrun Missions: Rally Cry	Fourth adventure of the Shadowrun Missions campaign 4th season (Seattle Story Arc 2). It is also part of the Buried Underground sub-story arc.
SRM0404	PDF only	4th	2011-09-26		Shadowrun Missions: Smuggler's Blues	Fifth adventure of the Shadowrun Missions campaign 4th season (Seattle Story Arc 2). It is also part of the Artifact Rush sub-story arc.
SRM0405	PDF only	4th	2011-12-09		Shadowrun Missions: On a Silver Platter	Sixth adventure of the Shadowrun Missions campaign 4th season (Seattle Story Arc 2). It is also part of the Buried Underground sub-story arc.
SRM0406	PDF only	4th	2012-01-11		Shadowrun Missions: Hard Target	Seventh adventure of the Shadowrun Missions campaign 4th season (Seattle Story Arc 2). It is also part of the Artifact Rush sub-story arc.
SRM0407	PDF only	4th	2012-02-20		Shadowrun Missions: Burn	Eighth adventure of the Shadowrun Missions campaign 4th season (Seattle Story Arc 2). It is also part of the Buried Underground sub-story arc.
SRM0408	PDF only	4th	2012-05-14		Shadowrun Missions: Brothers United	Ninth adventure of the Shadowrun Missions campaign 4th season (Seattle Story Arc 2). It is also part of the Artifact Rush sub-story arc.
SRM0409	PDF only	4th	2012-08-10		Shadowrun Missions: Assassin Nation	Tenth adventure of the Shadowrun Missions campaign 4th season (Seattle Story Arc 2). It is also part of the Buried Underground sub-story arc.
SRM0410	PDF only	4th	2012-09-17		Shadowrun Missions: Romero & Juliette	Eleventh adventure of the Shadowrun Missions campaign 4th season (Seattle Story Arc 2). It is also part of the Artifact Rush sub-story arc.
SRM0411	PDF only	4th	2012-11-16		Shadowrun Missions: Election Day	Twelfth adventure of the Shadowrun Missions campaign 4th season (Seattle Story Arc 2). It is also part of the Buried Underground sub-story arc.
SRM0412	PDF only	4th	2013-02-25		Shadowrun Missions: Showcase	Thirteenth adventure of the Shadowrun Missions campaign 4th season (Seattle Story Arc 2). It is also part of the Artifact Rush sub-story arc.
SRM0902	PDF only	5th & 6th	2021-12-15		Shadowrun Missions: Finders Keepers	Season 9 Episode 2 mission book
SRM0903	PDF only	5th & 6th	2022-01-21		Shadowrun Missions: Learning Little from Victory	Season 9 Episode 3 mission book
27481	PDF only	4th & 5th	2013-08-23	2075	Firing Line	Convention missions compilation of four adventures in Seattle, Manhattan, St. Louis and Bogotá.
26APR12	PDF only	4th	2012-04-01		Free Taiwan	A Shadowrun Mission adventure.
	PDF only	4th	2012		Copycat Killer	A gaming conventions adventure. Because it is prequel to SRM 04-05: On a Silver Platter but was only available on gaming conventions it is bundled with that adventure.
2635A	PDF only	4th	2009-04-01		BattleRun: Best Ever	It's a mashup "adventure" of BattleTech and Shadowrun. It based on a non-existent ruleset, and published on 1 April.
27400	978-1-936876-53-2	5th	2013-09-30	2075	Splintered State	An adventure set in Seattle.
27M0501	PDF only	5th	2013-09-30	2075	Shadowrun Missions: Chasin' the Wind	First adventure of the Shadowrun Missions campaign 5th season (Chicago Story Arc 1: Emerging the Wasteland).
27M0502	PDF only	5th	2014-04-30	2075	Shadowrun Missions: Critic's Choice	Second adventure of the Shadowrun Missions campaign 5th season (Chicago Story Arc 1: Emerging the Wasteland).
27M0503	PDF only	5th	2014-08-10	2075	Shadowrun Missions: Gone Long Gone	Third adventure of the Shadowrun Missions campaign 5th season (Chicago Story Arc 1: Emerging the Wasteland).
27M0504	PDF only	5th	2014-12-24	2075	Shadowrun Missions: Liberation	Fourth adventure of the Shadowrun Missions campaign 5th season (Chicago Story Arc 1: Emerging the Wasteland).
27M0505	PDF only	5th	2015-03-19	2075	Shadowrun Missions: While the City Sleeps	Fifth adventure of the Shadowrun Missions campaign 5th season (Chicago Story Arc 1: Emerging the Wasteland).
27M0506	PDF only	5th	2015-10-30		Shadowrun Missions: Take a Chance	Sixth adventure of the Shadowrun Missions campaign 5th season (Chicago Story Arc 1: Emerging the Wasteland).
27M0601	PDF only	5th	2015-12-18		Shadowrun Missions: Ten Fifty-Seven	First adventure of the Shadowrun Missions campaign 6th season (Chicago Story Arc 2).
27M0602	PDF only	5th	2016-01-20		Shadowrun Missions: Amber Waves of Grain	Second adventure of the Shadowrun Missions campaign 6th season (Chicago Story Arc 2).
27M0603	PDF only	5th	2016-05-17		Shadowrun Missions: Ancient Rumblings	Third adventure of the Shadowrun Missions campaign 6th season (Chicago Story Arc 2).
27M0604	PDF only	5th	2016-06-01		Shadowrun Missions: Tick Tock	Fourth adventure of the Shadowrun Missions campaign 6th season (Chicago Story Arc 2).
27M0605	PDF only	5th	2016-08-23		Shadowrun Missions: Healing the Sick	Fifth adventure of the Shadowrun Missions campaign 6th season (Chicago Story Arc 2).
27M0606	PDF only	5th	2016-09-19		Shadowrun Missions: Falling Angels	Sixth adventure of the Shadowrun Missions campaign 6th season (Chicago Story Arc 2).
27M0701	PDF only	5th	2016-11-16		Shadowrun Missions: The Deck Job	First adventure of the Shadowrun Missions campaign 7th season (Chicago Story Arc 3).
27M0702	PDF only	5th	2016-12-01		Shadowrun Missions: Collective Action	Second adventure of the Shadowrun Missions campaign 7th season (Chicago Story Arc 3).
27M0703	PDF only	5th	2017-01-20		Shadowrun Missions: Special Investigation Unit	Third adventure of the Shadowrun Missions campaign 7th season (Chicago Story Arc 3).
27M0704	PDF only	5th	2017-02-23		Shadowrun Missions: Do No Harm	Fourth adventure of the Shadowrun Missions campaign 7th season (Chicago Story Arc 3).
27M0705	PDF only	5th	2017-05-19		Shadowrun Missions: A Little Wetwork	Fifth adventure of the Shadowrun Missions campaign 7th season (Chicago Story Arc 3).
27M0706	PDF only	5th	2017-09-11		Shadowrun Missions: Windy City Chaos	Sixth adventure of the Shadowrun Missions campaign 7th season (Chicago Story Arc 3).
27M0801	PDF only	5th	2017-12-25		Shadowrun Missions: Keep Your Friends Close	First adventure of the Shadowrun Missions campaign 8th season (Chicago Story Arc 4).
27M0802	PDF only	5th	2018-03-04		Shadowrun Missions: Can You Dig It?	Second adventure of the Shadowrun Missions campaign 8th season (Chicago Story Arc 4).
27M0803	PDF only	5th	2020-01-21		Shadowrun Missions: 10 Block Tango	Third adventure of the Shadowrun Missions campaign 8th season (Chicago Story Arc 4).
27M0804	PDF only	5th	2020-02-24		Shadowrun Missions: Dirty Laundry	Fourth adventure of the Shadowrun Missions campaign 8th season (Chicago Story Arc 4).
27M0805	PDF only	5th	2020-04-08		Shadowrun Missions: Sleeping Giants	Fifth adventure of the Shadowrun Missions campaign 8th season (Chicago Story Arc 4).
27M0806	PDF only	5th	2020-05-26		Shadowrun Missions: Final Countdown	Sixth adventure of the Shadowrun Missions campaign 8th season (Finale of the Chicago Story Arc).
27482	978-1-942487-44-9	4th & 5th	2014-11-29	2075	London Falling	A convention missions compilation of four adventures in London.
27485	978-1-942487-48-7	5th	2015-10-16	2077-08-01	Boundless Mercy	A convention missions compilation of four adventures.
SMH201501	PDF only	5th	2015-04-01		Friendship Is Tragic	A Shadowrun Mission adventure published on 1 April.
SMH201601	PDF only	5th	2016-04-01		UnCONventional Warfare	A Shadowrun Mission adventure published on 1 April.
SMH201701	PDF only	5th	2017-04-01		Scene It All Before	A Shadowrun Mission adventure published on 1 April.
27450	978-1-941582-87-9	5th	2015-05-08	2077	Bloody Business	A campaign book with building blocks for nineteen adventures.
27451	978-1-942487-48-7	5th	2016-03-02	2078	Market Panic	A campaign book with info about the Big Ten.
27452	978-1-942487-64-7	5th	2017-03-11	2079-02-17	Book of the Lost	A campaign book with info about the Tarot.
27005	978-1-941582-94-7	5th	2015-06-29	2077	Chrome Flesh	A core cyberware and augmentation rulebook.
27006	978-1-941582-90-9	5th	2015-05-26	2076	Data Trails	A core decking and Matrix rulebook.
26CMP10	PDF only	4th	2012-09-17	2074	Elven Blood	A convention missions compilation of five adventures in Tír Tairngire, Seattle, and Portland.
27300	978-1-941582-00-8	5th	2015-05-08	2076-09-03	Lockdown	A "crossover" plot book and campaign including three adventures set in Boston.
26501	978-1-936876-25-9	4th	2013-01-12		Sprawl Sites: High Society and Low Life	A guide to several Sprawl locations with plot hooks and maps.
26500	978-1-936876-21-1	4th	2012-06-19		Sprawl Sites: North America	A guide to several Sprawl locations with plot hooks and maps.
27200	978-1-936876-54-9	5th	2014-05-14	2076	Stolen Souls	A guide to extractions and info on Manhattan.
27201	978-1-941582-89-3	5th	2015-10-08	2077	Hard Targets	A guide to wetwork, tactics, critical gear and info on Havana.
27202	978-1-942487-63-0	5th	2016-12-09		Cutting Aces	A Sixth World guide to con artistry. Deep Shadows Sourcebook with plot information, story ideas, and characters that can be used with Fifth edition and Shadowrun: Anarchy.
26S037	PDF only	5th	2015-04-24		Ten Terrorists	A guide with profiles of terrorist groups.
26S036	PDF only	5th	2013-10-25		The Assassin's Primer	Expanded rules for assassin characters.
26410	978-1-934857-96-0	4th	2012-10-09		Boardroom Backstabs 2: Sacrificial Limb	Second in "Boardroom Backstabs" series of adventures.
27409	978-1-936876-18-1	4th & 5th	2015-02-21	2076	Boardroom Backstabs 3: Battle of Manhattan	Third in "Boardroom Backstabs" series of adventures.
26S044		5th	2015-04-07		Shadows in Focus: Sioux Nation: Starving the Masses	An adventure set in Cheyenne, Sioux Nation.
26S043	PDF only	5th	2015-09-24	2075	Shadows in Focus: City by Shadow: Butte	A guide for the city Butte.
26S046	PDF only	5th	2015-10-16	2077-10-12	Shadows in Focus: Sioux Nation: Counting Coup	An adventure set in Sioux Nation.
26S050	PDF only	5th	2016-01-20	2077-12-28	Shadows in Focus: City by Shadow: San Francisco Metroplex	A guide for city San Francisco.
27500	978-1-936876-59-4	5th	2013-11-19		Gear Cards, Series 1	Quick reference to 54 different pieces of gear.
27502	978-1-936876-87-7	5th	2013-11-19		Spell Cards, Series 1	Easy-to-reference game statistics for 54 different spells.
27PM001	PDF only	5th	2016-03-09		Killing Pawn	An adventure set in the Prime Missions series.
27PM002	PDF only	5th	2016-10-23		A Holy Piece of Wetwork	An adventure set in the Prime Missions series.
27PM005	PDF only	5th	2017-04-17		Jumping Ship	An adventure set in the Prime Missions series. (Internal text refers to this as PM01, but the cover and stock number show PM005)
27110	978-1-941582-93-0	5th	2016-04-15		Seattle Sprawl Digital Box Set	A full box set about Seattle: maps, gang details and character cards.
27401	978-1-936876-57-0	5th	2016-03-02	2078-03	Serrated Edge	First adventure of the Denver Adventure Set.
27402	978-1-936876-61-7	5th	2016-12-09	2078 (mid-to-late)	False Flag	Second adventure of the Denver Adventure Set.
27403	978-1-941582-92-3	5th	2017-06-08	2079-03	Ripping Reality	Third adventure of the Denver Adventure Set.
27231		5th	2017-11-27	2079-12-17	Dark Terrors	Plot sourcebook
26S057	PDF only	5th	2018-02-27	2080-01-06	Shadows in Focus: Morocco	A guide for Morocco.
27012		5th	2018-06-17		Street Lethal	Advanced combat rulebook
27013		5th	2018-08-06	2080	Kill Code	Advanced Matrix rulebook
27014		5th	2018-11-23	2080-04-18	Better Than Bad	Deep Shadows Sourcebook
27015		5th	2019-01-23	2080-06-10	No Future	A Cyberpunk sourcebook
27454		Any	2019-06-12	2080	Neo-Anarchist Streetpedia	A Deep Shadows sourcebook
28000	978-1-941582-78-7	6th	2019-08-26	2080	Shadowrun, Sixth World Core Rulebook	Core Rulebook
28000LE	978-1-941582-79-4	6th	2019-08-26	2080	Shadowrun, Sixth World Limited Edition	Limited Edition Core Rulebook
28000EE	978-1-947335-51-6	6th	2019-08-26	2080	Shadowrun, Sixth World Executive Edition	Executive Edition Core Rulebook
28000S		6th	2021	2080	Shadowrun, Sixth World Core Rulebook/City Edition/Seattle	Updated Core Rulebook
28001		6th	2019	2080	Sixth World Gamemaster's Screen	Game Master's Screen
28002	978-1-947335-06-6	6th	2020-05-26	2080	Firing Squad	Core Combat Rulebook
28003	978-1-947335-08-0	6th	2020	2080	Street Wyrd	Core Magic Rulebook
28004		6th	2021-10-05 (digital)	2080	Double Clutch	Core Rigger Rulebook
28010		6th	2019	2080	Sixth World Beginner Box	Beginner Box
28100	978-1-63861-024-3	6th	2021-01-01 (print), 2022-03-17 (digital)	2080	Emerald City	Seattle source book
28300	978-1-942487-81-4	6th	2020-01-17	2080	Cutting Black	Plot Book for events in Detroit in 2080
28301	978-1-947335-11-0	6th	2020-08-24	2080	Slip Streams	Plot book for astral and magical events in 2080
28302		6th	2021-12-15 (digital)	2080	The Kechibi Code	Plot sourcebook
28400	978-1-942487-83-8	6th	2020-03-04	2080	30 Nights	Campaign book for Shadowrun, Sixth World.
28401	PDF Only	6th	2019-11-05	2080	Free Seattle	Adventure for Shadowrun, Sixth World.
28402	978-1-947335-09-7	6th	2021	2080	Assassins Night	Campaign Book centered around Barcelona
28403	PDF Only	6th	2022-04-15	2080	The Third Parallel	Campaign Book centered around Denver
28450	978-1-947335-07-3	6th	2020	2080	Collapsing Now	Organizational source book
28451	978-1-947335-68-4	6th	2020	2080	Power Plays	Runner Resource Book
	PDF Only	6th	2022-01-21	2080	Lofwyr's Legions	Drake rules for PCs and NPCs
27002S		5th & 6th	2020-07-08	2080	Krime Katalog	Weapons and vehicles sourcebook with stats for both 5th and 6th editions
28840S		6th	2020-05-01	2080	Tales from the UCAS - Age of Rust	Plot hooks, rules, and other material
28881S		6th	2020-07-08	2080	Shadow Stock - Ingentis Athletes	A selection of characters and rules for using them
		6th		2080	Margin Calls	Plot Sourcebook
28011	978-1-63861-192-9	6th	2025-04-02	2080	Deadly Arts	Core Advanced Combat Rulebook
28305	978-1-63861-183-7	6th	2025-01-22	2080	Lethal Harvest	Plot Sourcebook
28516	978-1-63861-164-6	6th		2080	Tarnished Star	Runner Resource Book
28009	978-1-63861-158-5	6th		2080	Smooth Operations	Core Face Rulebook
		6th		2080	Final Bets	Campaign Book
28304	978-1-63861-144-8	6th		2080	Needle's Eye	Plot Sourcebook
28453		6th		2080	Falling Point	Runner Resource Book
	978-1638611387	6th		2080	Wild Life	Core Critter Book
	978-1638611271	6th	2023-11-22	2080	Scotophobia	Plot Sourcebook
		6th		2080	Shoot Straight	Runner Resource Book
	978-1638611189	6th		2080	Body Shop	Core Augmentation Book
		6th		2080	Whisper Nets	Campaign Book
28101	978-1638611141	6th	2023-03-08	2080	Astral Ways	6th World Setting Book
28452	978-1638611004	6th		2080	Null Value	Runner Resource Book
	978-1638610274	6th		2080	Shadow Cast	Runner Resource Book
	978-1638610694	6th		2080	Hack & Slash	Core Matrix Rulebook
	978-1638610267	6th		2080	Sixth World Companion	Core Character Rulebook
		6th		2080	No Future	Cyberpunk Sourcebook
Miscellaneous items
7111	1-55560-132-4	1st	1991	2050	D.M.Z.: Downtown Militarized Zone	A box set board game.
7401	1-55560-216-9	2nd	1994	2050	Sprawl Maps	A set of maps usable with D.M.Z.
7701	1-55560-327-0	—N/a	1997	—N/a	High Tech and Low Life – The Art of Shadowrun	Art Book collection.
28507	PDF Only	—N/a	2020-03-25	—N/a	Sixth World Activity Book	Coloring and activity book with Shadowrun art.

== Magazines ==
There were two short lived, FASA approved, paper magazines for Shadowrun. The first—KA•GE—was published by The Shadowrun Network, with thirteen issues. The second—Shadowland—was published by Sword of the Knight Publications, with seven issues.

KA•GE Issue	Publication Date	
KA•GE Issue	Real World	In Game^{†}
Issue Zero	Origins ’91	2052-Jun-23
Vol.1, Issue One	October 1991	2052-Sep-20
Vol.1, Issue Two	Winter 1991	2052-Dec-05
Vol.1, Issue 3	First Quarter 1992	2053-Mar-12
Vol.1, Issue 4	Second Quarter 1992	Summer 2053
Vol.1, Issue 5	Third Quarter 1992	Fall 2053
Vol.1, Issue 6	Fourth Quarter 1992	Winter 2053
Vol.1, Issue 7	First Quarter 1993	Spring 2054
Vol.1, Issue 8	Second Quarter 1993	Summer 2054
Vol.1, Issue 9	Third Quarter 1993	Fall 2054
Vol.1, Issue 10	Fourth Quarter 1993	Winter 2054
Vol.1, Issue 11	First Quarter 1994	Spring 2055
Vol.1, Issue 12	2nd Quarter 1994	Summer 2055

^{†} If there was no in game date on the cover, the most recent date-stamp within the issue is listed.

Shadowland Issue	Publication Date	
Shadowland Issue	Real World	In Game^{†}
Vol. 1	Oct/Nov/Dec 1995	2056-Oct-21
Vol. 2	December 1995	2056-Dec-22
Vol. 3	April 1996	2057-Mar-04
Vol. 4	August 1996	2057-Jul-25
Vol. 5	December 1996	2057-Aug-17
Vol. 6	April 1997	2058-Feb-27
Vol. 7	October 1997	none listed

^{†} The most recent date-stamp within the issue.

== Novels and other fiction ==
FASA published the original trade paperback through Contemporary Books. All subsequent novels were published by ROC, 40 with FASA (1990–2001), and six with WizKids (circa 2006). When the FASA era novels were re-released in 2003 the ISBNs were updated to include FASA's four digit SKU (ISBN ×-×××-×FFFF-×), prior to this the FASA SKU and ISBN were generally unrelated. The six novels produced by WizKids circa 2006 were loosely linked to Shadowrun Duels.

Alongside translations of the English-language novels and RPG books, German publishers Heyne and Fantasy Productions put out a number of original German-language novels, written exclusively by German authors and also set in Germany. Even after publication of English-language novels stopped in 2001 both publishers continued to put out original novels in Germany until license shifts occurred in 2008.

By that time, Catalyst Game Labs announced that new English Shadowrun novels would be released starting in 2009. Since then, novels, novellas and "enhanced" fiction books have been released on a regular basis. Enhanced fiction releases include stats for characters and gear as well as plot hooks for adventures related to the book.

FASA Novels
#	FASA SKU	Title	Author	ISBN	Date	Notes
0	7601	Into the Shadows	Jordan K. Weisman (editor)	1-55560-118-9	1990-02	First Shadowrun fiction-only release. A trade paperback short story anthology set in 2050. The stories loosely interacted with one another.
1	5078	Never Deal with a Dragon	Robert N. Charrette	0-1401-5239-3; 0-451-45078-7	1990-12	(Secrets of Power #1) The year is 2050. The power of magic and the creatures that accompany it have returned to Earth. For Sam Verner, living in the womb of the Renraku conglomerate was easy, until his sister disappeared and reality began to disintegrate. Now Sam wants out, but he must face the world of Shadowrun.
2	5125	Choose Your Enemies Carefully	Robert N. Charrette	0-1401-5240-7; 0-451-45087-6	1991-02	(Secrets of Power #2) When magic returns, its power calls Sam Verner. As Sam searches for his sister through the slick and scary streets of 2050, his quest leads him across the ocean to England, where druids rule the streets... and the throne. But all is not what it seems, and Sam and his new shadow friends are plunged into a maze of madness on the trail of destruction. Only when Sam accepts his destiny as a shaman can he embrace the power he needs. But what waits for him in the final confrontation of technology and human flesh is a secret much darker than anything he knew waiting in the shadows...
3	5145	Find Your Own Truth	Robert N. Charrette	0-451-45082-5; 0-451-45145-7	1991–06; 2003-06	(Secrets of Power #3) He was only a beginner shaman, but Sam Verner had to find a cure to ward off the curse on his sister. Only something of great magic would do the trick.
4	5210	2XS	Nigel Findley	0-451-45139-2; 0-451-45210-0	1992–02; 2003-07	(2052 A.D.) Private Detective Dirk Montgomery thinks he knows the streets. He watched the change of the world, as magic grows and alter the balance of power, he thinks he understands the deepest shadows and the darkest of hearts. He was wrong....
5	5218	Changeling	Christopher Kubasik	0-451-45163-5; 0-451-45218-6	1992–06; 2003-06	(2038 A.D. & 2052 A.D.) Chicago - Peter Clarris was a human boy who changed into a troll. He grows up surviving as a shadowrunner.
6	5220	Never Trust an Elf	Robert N. Charrette	0-451-45178-3; 0-451-45220-8	1992–08; 2003-06	When Kham, an ork living in the Seattle ghetto in the year 2053, is suddenly snatched from his day-to-day existence and thrust into a world of dragons, he learns the hard way whom to trust.
7	5143^{†}	Into the Shadows	Jordan K. Weisman (editor)	0-451-45189-9	1992-10	Anthology (reprint of above). “Into the Shadows” by Robert Charrette was replaced by “A Plague of Demons” by Tom Dowd since the former had been expanded into Never Deal with a Dragon.^{†}Some sites list a FASA SKU of 5189 based on the ISBN, although the generally reliable Dumpshock Bookstore listed 5143.
8	5199	Streets of Blood	Carl Sargent & Marc Gascoigne	0-451-45199-6	1992-12	Murder, Mystery, Intrigue and Betrayal! A story in foggy old England of 2054, the 1st book with elven mage Serrin Shamander and British Lord Geraint Llanfrechfa.
9	5302-1	Shadowplay	Nigel Findley	0-451-45228-3	1993-02	(November, 2053) - Sly is a veteran. She's run more shadows than she cares to remember, and has the physical and emotional scars to prove it. But no matter how violent it became, it had always been business as usual. Until now. Falcon is a kid. He thinks he hears the call of magic, and the voice of one of the Great Spirits seems to whisper in his hear. He's gone to Seattle, the urban jungle, to seek his calling. Thrown together, veteran and novice, Sly and Falcon find themselves embroiled in a deadly confrontation between the world's most powerful corporations. If this confrontation is not stopped it could turn into all-out warfare, spilling out of the shadows and onto the streets themselves.
10	5310	Night's Pawn	Tom Dowd	0-451-45238-0; 0-451-45310-7	1993–04; 2003-06	(2053?) Jason Chase is a longtime shadowrunner. After many good years, he is trying to get out. While he can...
11	5313	Striper Assassin	Nyx Smith	0-451-45254-2; 0-451-45313-1	1993–06; 2003-06	Prey for the hunter. For the world of humans knows her as Striper, the deadly Asian assassin and kick-artist. She has come to the City of Brotherly Love seeking revenge and made it her killing ground. But she is not the only predator stalking the dark underbelly of the Philadelphia metroplex. There are other hunters prowling the night, and some possess a power even greater than hers.
12	5367	Lone Wolf	Nigel Findley	0-451-45272-0; 0-451-45367-0	1994–02; 2003-06	With gangs conquering the streets of Seattle, Rick Larson, doing undercover work for Lone Star, Seattle's contracted police force, finds himself on the wrong side of the law.
13	5365	Fade to Black	Nyx Smith	0-451-45287-9; 0-451-45365-4	1994–04; 2003-06	(2054) Newark Megaplex - Rico and his shadow runners are hired to retrieve a scientist who is being held against his will by a corporation. This simple retrieval becomes ever so more complicated, endangering their lives.
14	5427	Nosferatu	Carl Sargent & Marc Gascoigne	0-451-45302-6; 0-451-45427-8	1994–08; 2003-06	Mage and part-time shadowrunner Serrin Shamander and his companions desperately flee a relentless, demonic enemy out to eliminate humankind from the face of the earth. This is the 2nd book with renegade elven mage Serrin Shamander and British Lord Geraint Llanfrechfa.
15	5445	Burning Bright	Tom Dowd	0-451-45368-9	1994-11	(2055) Chicago - Kyle Teller tries to find a missing megacorp giant CEO's son, and discovers more than he bargained for, a threat that could ultimately engulf all of metahumanity.
16	5448	Who Hunts the Hunter	Nyx Smith	0-451-45369-7; 0-451-45448-0	1995–05; 2003-06	(2055) - Striper's cub is stolen from her, only through betrayal could this happen. Now guided by her instincts, the werecat resumes her human guise, reclaims her cub and a strong dose of vengeance, leading her down the trail to dangers of the Rotten Apple aka New York Megaplex (Manhattan). This semi-sequel to Striper Assassin introduces characters from previous Nyx Smith SR novels.
17	5495	House of the Sun	Nigel Findley	0-451-45370-0; 0-451-45495-2	1995–07; 2003-06	Venturing to the Kingdom of Hawaii when a megacorporate exec demands payment of an old debt, shadowrunner Dirk Montgomery finds himself having to outrun the corrupt factions battling for control of the island.
18	5496	Worlds Without End	Caroline Spector	0-451-45371-9; 0-451-45496-0	1995–10; 2003-06	(2056) Aina is an immortal elf, she has woken into a reawakened era of magic (the 6th World) to stop ancient evil from destroying the world. This story was originally written to conclude the Immortals trilogy; of which the first two parts were Earthdawn novels still unpublished at the time. Scars (ISBN 0-9745734-2-6) was published in 2005, and Little Treasures remains unpublished in English.
19	5537	Just Compensation	Robert N. Charrette	0-451-45372-7; 0-451-45537-1	1996–01; 2003-06	Becoming accidentally involved with shadowrunners, Andy and his disenchanted army major brother, Tom, uncover a sinister web of corrupt politicians and officers that threatens to dismantle the UCAS government.
20	5539	Black Madonna	Carl Sargent & Marc Gascoigne	0-451-45373-5	1996-04	(2057) - MegaCorp enlists an elite decker, who reunited with old friends from England to try to keep a megacorp from being blackmailed by a super hacker. They come to discover that ancient powers are clashing to prevent a secret from being told. This is the 3rd book with renegade elven mage Serrin Shamander and British Lord Geraint Llanfrechfa.
21	5540	Preying for Keeps	Mel Odom	0-451-45374-3	1996-07	A small-time mobster wants to go legit—and what better way than manipulating two biogenetic engineering corporations into corporate war? So when a shadowrunning team is brought in by one of the companies to recover vital computer chips believed stolen by the competition, they uncover a tangled plot more devious than anything they could have imagined.
22	5542	Dead Air	Jak Koke	0-451-45375-1	1996-10	(2057) Jonathan and Tamara, two elven bikers try to survive a megacorp rigging their sport, Combat Biking!
23	5594	The Lucifer Deck	Lisa Smedman	0-451-45377-8	1997-01	In its efforts to control all information in the Shadowrun universe, a giant corporation inadvertently calls up a violent spirit from another dimension, and only a young girl can save the universe from the ensuing havoc.
24	5627	Steel Rain	Nyx Smith	0-451-45593-2	1997-03	(2057) - A corporate security samurai must fight to defend her megacorp from being taken over by a relentless enemy.
25	5628	Shadowboxer	Nicholas Pollotta	0-451-45600-9; 0-451-45628-9	1997–05; 2003-06	(2058) Miami - Adam Two Bear, a dwarf mercenary accustomed to running in the shadows, is given a job that sounded like an easy run and a way to make a huge stack of cash: track down and discover the meaning of the word of "IronHell". But when a decker he approached gets her brain fried in the Matrix, Two Bears knows he up to his stout little shoulders in drek.
26	5629	Stranger Souls	Jak Koke	0-451-45610-6; 0-451-45629-7	1997–07; 2003-06	Dragon Heart #1 In this first book of "The Dragonheart Saga", the shocking assassination of newly elected President Dunkelzahn shatters the dawn of a new era for the denizens of the Shadowrun universe. Now as shadowrunners, Secret Service agents, and mega-corp execs scramble for the reins of power, only a miracle can save the world from total annihilation!
27	5630	Headhunters	Mel Odom	0-451-45614-9; 0-451-45630-0	1997–10; 2003-06	Jack Slater and his shadowrunner team are hired to penetrate the high-tech security around a funeral home and retrieve the corpse of a double agent—a hot property that holds the key to an assassination. Original.
28	5631	Clockwork Asylum	Jak Koke	0-451-45620-3; 0-451-45631-9	1997–11; 2003-06	Dragon Heart #2 The maelstrom of cyber-magic and political intrigue following President Dunkelzahn's assassination rages out of control. Ryan Mercury, Dunkelzahn's secret agent, is torn between his duty and his desire to find a killer. But when a spirit wrongly concludes that Ryan is working for the enemy, he anoints a cyberzombie to carry out a hit of its own. Now with an impressive arsenal of allies, weaponry, and the Dragon Heart, Ryan just might pull off the save of the century—if he doesn't lose his life first!
29	5709	Blood Sport	Lisa Smedman	0-451-45625-4; 0-451-45709-9	1998–01; 2003-06	Mama Grande streaked into Leni's life like a nightmare on wheels. Arriving out of nowhere, she claimed to be the ex-Lone Star detective's grandmother, and spouted dire prophecies of rivers of blood and a world in flames. But her bizarre murder prompts Leni and Combat Biker wannabe Rafael to investigate Mama Grande's past...straight into the dark heart of Aztlan-a lost civilization where human sacrifice is all the rage, and ancient ceremonial games could trigger the end of the world!
30	5710	Beyond the Pale	Jak Koke	0-451-45674-2; 0-451-45710-2	1998–03; 2003-06	(Dragon Heart #3) - (2057) The Enemies with unlimited powers, ultimate evil is about to arrive, Ryan Mercury and his runners have only two options left: Victory or Death
31	5711	Technobabel	Stephen Kenson	0-451-45699-8; 0-451-45711-0	1998–05; 2003-06	(2059) - Boston Metroplex - Babel awoke in a body bag, his brain fried, a black hole where his memory should be. If not for his cool carbon-fiber blade concealed in his bones, he would've been dead for sure. What he does know, is that he not who he was anymore. He is now otaku, a technoshaman of the Matrix, with powers over the Matrix similar to what a traditional shaman of magic has over spirits and the natural world. Now, everyone is after him, he doesn't know why.
32	5712	Wolf and Raven	Michael A. Stackpole	0-451-45995-4; 0-451-45712-9	1998–07; 2003-06	The adventures of Wolfgang Kies, soldier of fortune. Together with a group of cyborg bounty hunters and computer wizards, he assists elf lord Dr. Richard Raven in keeping humanity safe from preying monsters—both magical and technological! But crime lord Etienne LaPlante interferes with their vigilantism, preparing to strike at Raven and those who serve him.... Loosely connected to the final two stories in Into the Shadows
33	5713	Psychotrope	Lisa Smedman	0-451-45708-0; 0-451-45713-7	1998–10; 2003-06	(2060) - Seattle's Matrix suddenly goes down, and only 5 deckers can save it and possibly the Matrix from collapsing completely.
34	5714	The Terminus Experiment	Jak Koke & Jonathan E. Bond	0-451-45704-8; 0-451-45714-5	1999–01; 2003-06	(2060) Seattle - A conspiracy arrives to spread a plague of vampires. Warren Storey must discover the reason for the plague before time runs out.
35	5741	Run Hard, Die Fast	Mel Odom	0-451-45737-4; 0-451-45741-2	1999–02; 2003-06	Top shadowrunner and street samurai Argent meets with a potential client only to be caught in the middle of a deadly corporation crossfire that leaves corpses scattered across the streets. It turns out the meeting was arranged by Argent's former lover, who is trapped in the Pueblo Corporate Council lands. On the run and hunted by assault teams, she knows that Argent's samurai code of honor will drive him to protect her. But in order to save her, he must confront the secrets of his past, and assemble a rag-tag team of mercenaries to elude the three corporations that have decided everyone involved would be better off dead.
36	5742	Crossroads	Stephen Kenson	0-451-45740-4; 0-451-45742-0	1999–04; 2003-06	[Tommy Talon Series No.#1] - (2060) - Boston Metroplex: Tommy Talon, a member of the elite shadowrunner group Assets, Inc., is drawn back to home by secrets from his past, which lead to conflicts with megacorporations, Yakuza gangsters and a powerful spirit that's hunting him down. Talon must use all his powers and abilities with the aid of shadowrunning friends to unravel the mystery.
37	5749	The Forever Drug	Lisa Smedman	0-451-45747-1; 0-451-45749-8	1999–06; 2004-02	A shapeshifter and freelance agent for the Lone Star police department, Romulus risks his life to save a beautiful amnesiac woman from ruthless drug dealers who are peddling the ultimate high—a magical creature that gives its victims an extraordinary feeling of euphoria before it destroys them.
38	5775	Ragnarock	Stephen Kenson	0-451-45774-9; 0-451-45775-7	2000–02; 2003-06	[Tommy Talon Series No.#2] - (2061) - Germany - Tom Talon and his shadowrunners of Boston have been called in to retrieve a rogue archaeologist who has found ancient artifacts. However, things are more than they seem.
39	5819	Tails You Lose	Lisa Smedman	0-451-45818-4; 0-451-45819-2	2001–02; 2003-06	(2062) - Framed for a crime she didn't commit, she's now trying prove her innocence before time runs out for her.
40	5839	The Burning Time	Stephen Kenson	0-451-45839-7	2001-08	[Tommy Talon Series No.#3] (2061) - Boston Metroplex - Low-level programmer Roy Kilaro wants nothing more but to become a Seraphim, an elite corporation operative, and experience some real live action in the shadow ops between megacorporations. He gets more than he ever wanted when a routine business trip to Boston lands him at ground zero of a running battle for survival. The combatants: a group of hardened 'runners trying to finish a job, the ruthless anti-elven terrorist group known as the Knights of the Red Branch, and a powerful sorceress who wants revenge upon them all...
41	????	Private Agenda	Michael Mulvihill	N/A	N/A	announced in Europe, never released

WizKids Novels
#	Title	Author	ISBN	Date	Notes
1	Born To Run	Stephen Kenson	0-451-46058-8	2005-11	[Kellan Colt Trilogy #1] (2063) Seattle Metroplex - Kellan Colt goes to Seattle to learn how to be a professional shadowrunner and discover her past.
2	Poison Agendas	Stephen Kenson	0-451-46063-4	2006-01	[Kellan Colt Trilogy #2] (2063) Seattle Metroplex - Kellan Colt tries to do her first solo mission, but there's more to it than it seems. Can she handle it?
3	Fallen Angels	Stephen Kenson	0-451-46076-6	2006-03	[Kellan Colt Trilogy #3] (2063) - Kellan Colt's past returns, hidden truths are revealed. Will she survive to discover the truth?
4	Drops of Corruption	Jason M. Hardy	0-451-46083-9	2006-05	(2063) - Burned-out shaman Bannickburn tries to return to glory by working for the Mob.
5	Aftershock	Jean Rabe & John Helfers	0-451-46101-0	2006-07	(2063) - A shadowrun team steal plants for a client, only to be set up for a crime by their client.
6	A Fistful of Data	Stephen Dedman	0-451-46116-9	2006-10	(2063) - Inhabitants of the Crypt must fight for their home as someone tries to get at a secret inside of it.

Catalyst Game Lab Novels
#	Title	Author	ASIN	Date	Notes
1	Spells & Chrome	John Helfers	E-CAT26850; 978-1-934857-23-6	2010-May-14; 2010-Dec-22	ePub Anthology 1^{PDF Info Sheet} book
2	Sail Away, Sweet Sister	Patrick Goodman	ASIN B00JVC7FQU; E-CAT26S041	2014-Apr-22	ePub Novella. Classified as "enhanced fiction".
3	Neat	Russell Zimmerman	ASIN B00A5GSSLC	2012-Nov-10	ePub Novella
4	The Vladivostok Gauntlet	Olivier Gagnon	ASIN B00F8UF1LU; E-CAT26S030	2013-Sep-16	ePub Novella. Classified as "enhanced fiction".
5	Fire & Frost	Kai O'Connal	ASIN B00N2C2MFY; 978-1-936876-79-2	2014-Jul-02; 2014-Aug-26	ePub Novel book
6	Nothing Personal	Olivier Gagnon	ASIN B00MLQXQ9I; E-CAT26S038	2014-Aug-10	ePub Novella
7	Another Rainy Night	Patrick Goodman	ASIN B00F70LZ52; E-CAT26S022	2013-Sep-13	ePub Novella Classified as "enhanced fiction".
8	Hell on Water	Jason Hardy	ASIN B00RH5B0U0; 978-1-936876-80-8	2014-Dec-25	epub Novel
9	Dark Resonance	Phaedra Weldon	ASIN B00RJI8P3U; 978-1-936876-81-5	2014-Dec-28	epub Novel
10	DocWagon 19	Jennifer Brozek	ASIN B00UZERM84	2015-Mar-19	ePub Novella
11	Crimson	Kevin Czarnecki	ASIN B00WNAVD1K	2015-Apr-1	ePub Novel
12	Borrowed Time	R. L. King	ASIN B00YBHGGU6; 978-1942487203	2015-May-27	ePub Novel; Paperback
13	Shaken: No Job Too Small	Russell Zimmerman	ASIN 1936876833	2015-Jul-13	ePub Novel
14	Wolf & Buffalo	R. L. King	ASIN B01467XWDE	2015-Aug-19	ePub Novella Classified as "enhanced fiction".
15	Deniable Assets	Mel Odom	ASIN B01BJA63XM	2016-Feb-05	ePub Novel
16	World of Shadows	John Helfers	ASIN B01BJBXCY4	2016-Feb-06	Anthology 2
17	Drawing Destiny: A Sixth World Tarot Anthology	John Helfers	ASIN B01LK9X8M6	2016-Sep-03	Anthology 3
18	Big Dreams	R.L. King	ASIN B01N1OBVV0	2016-Dec-02	ePub Novella
19	Blind Magic	Dylan Birtolo	ASIN B06XGCVV4Y	2017-Mar-06	ePub Novella
##	Shadowrun: Hong Kong	Mel Odom	ASIN B01LA5K8HS	2016-Aug-30	ePub Novel
##	Shadows Down Under	Jean Rabe	ASIN B0799646DC	2018-Jan-23	ePub Novel
##	Undershadows	Jason Hardy	ASIN B07GJV2W7V; 978-1942487241	2018-Aug-15; 2016-Jun-08	ePub Novel; Paperback
##	Shadowrun: Sprawl Stories: Volume One	John Helfers	ASIN B07MJ8LQSF; 978-1-934857-23-6	2019-Jan-25; 2019-Jan-20	ePub Anthology book
##	The Frame Job: Part 1: Yu (Shadowrun Sixth World Edition Fiction)	Dylan Birtolo	ASIN B07RB86Q9P	2019-Apr-30	ePub Novella
##	The Frame Job: Part 2: Emu (Shadowrun Sixth World Edition Fiction)	Brooke Chang	ASIN B07S2LQ1ZG	2019-May-18	ePub Novella
##	The Frame Job: Part 3: Rude (Shadowrun Sixth World Edition Fiction)	Bryan CP Steele	ASIN B07SFDW95P	2019-May-28	ePub Novella
##	The Frame Job: Part 4: Frostburn (Shadowrun Sixth World Edition Fiction)	CZ Wright	ASIN B07SX9WJBN	2019-Jun-10	ePub Novella
##	The Frame Job: Part 5: Zipfile (Shadowrun Sixth World Edition Fiction)	Jason Schmetzer	ASIN B07TPLFF8R	2019-Jun-25	ePub Novella
##	The Frame Job: Part 6: Retribution (Shadowrun Sixth World Edition Fiction)	Jason M. Hardy	ASIN B07VSYTTNK	2019-Jul-25	ePub Novella
50?	Makeda Red	Jennifer Brozek	ASIN B07SVQLLBP; 978-1942487845	2019-Jun-7; 2019-Jun-5	ePub Novel; Paperback
##	Between a Corp and a Hard Place	Jennifer Brozek	Game Trade Magazine Issue 232	2019-Jun-16	Serial story
##	The Johnson Run	Kai O'Connal	ASIN B07V9X4T92; 978-1942487852	2019-Jul-14; 2019-Jul-15	ePub Novel; Paperback
##	The Complete Frame Job	John Helfers	ASIN B082DQ8S98; 978-1942487869	2019-Dec-04; 2019-Sep-20	Anthology of Novellas
##	Tower of the Scorpion	Mel Odom	ASIN B07ZJ1K4FX	2019-Oct-23	ePub Novella
##	Shadow Dance	Aaron Rosenberg	ASIN B0845X27F3	2020-Jan-22	ePub Novel
##	Identity Crisis	Phaedra Weldon	ASIN B088QYN82Y; 978-1947335134	2020-May-22; 2020-May-21	epub Novel; Paperback
##	Chaser	Russell Zimmerman	ASIN B0886BTWKQ	2020-May-30	ePub Novella
##	A Kiss to Die For	Jennifer Brozek	ASIN B089SN3GBW	2020-Jun-17	ePub Novella
##	Crocodile Tears	Chris A. Jackson	ASIN B08CV1MR4L	2020-Jul-17	ePub Novella
54?	Stirred	Russell Zimmerman	ASIN B08G6Z6VDT; 978-1947335141	2020-Aug-18; 2020-Aug-19	ePub Novel; Paperback
##	99 Bottles	Rusty Childers	CAT26S005	2011-09-16	Classified as "enhanced fiction", compatible with 4th edition / 20th Anniversary.
##	Nothing Personal	Oliver Gagnon	CAT26S038	2014-09-10	Classified as an "enhanced fiction" Adventure, compatible with 5th edition. (set in 2076)
##	The Seattle Gambit	Oliver Gagnon	CAT26056S	2017-12-01	Classified as "enhanced fiction" Adventure, compatible with 5th edition and Shadowrun: Anarchy.
##	Adversary	Russell Zimmerman	CAT26062S	2020-01-13	Classified as "enhanced fiction" Adventure, compatible with Shadowrun: Sixth World edition.
