= The Grimoire (Shadowrun) =

Tabletop role-playing game supplement

- 1st edition, cover art by John Zeleznik
- Designers: 1st edition; Paul R. Hume; 2nd edition; Mark Chaffe; Thomas A. Dowd; Paul R. Hume; Steve Kenson; Christopher Kubasik; Carl Sargent
- Illustrators: 1st edition; John Zeleznik; Joel Biske; Timothy Bradstreet; Rick Harris; Jeff Laubenstein; Jim Nelson; 2nd edition; Thomas Baxa; Janet Aulisio; Joel Biske; Dell Harris; Dana Knutson; Jeff Laubenstein; Mike Medynsky; Jim Nelson; Mike Nielsen; Anthony Szczudlo; Karl Waller
- Publishers: FASA
- Publication: 1990
- Genres: Near future Science fantasy

The Grimoire is a supplement published by FASA in 1990 for the near-future science fantasy role-playing game Shadowrun. A second edition was published in 1994.

== Contents ==
The Grimoire is a supplement that contains rules for magical societies, magic spells, Astral Space, and spirits. The book is divided into 13 chapters:

1. "Making Magicians": The essential differences between a magician and an ordinary human.
2. "Magic and Society": The impact of magic on mainstream religions and the business world, and laws relating to magic.
3. "Adepts": A new type of wizard.
4. "Initiation": Progressing as a magician.
5. "Metamagic": New abilities granted to initiates.
6. "Geas": How an obligation or prohibition can be placed on a mage.
7. "Magical Groups": Various esoteric orders.
8. "Enchantment": A new skill to help a mage.
9. "Spells and Spell Designs": How to create a new spell.
10. "Astral Plane": A parallel world.
11. "Allied Spirits": Those that are controlled by a mage
12. "Free Spirits": Spirits that have gained enough strength to break away from a mage.
13. Magical Threats": The power of shamans

The book concludes with an appendix that details rule changes, a price list, a glossary of magic terms and a list of spells.

== Publication history ==
FASA published the science fantasy RPG Shadowrun in 1989, and immediately followed up with a series of sourcebooks to expand details only mentioned in the core rulebook. The seventh of these was 1990's The Grimoire, a 128-page soft-cover book written by Paul R. Hume, with a cover by John Zeleznik, and interior art by Joel Biske, Timothy Bradstreet, Rick Harris, Jeff Laubenstein, and Jim Nelson. When a second edition of Shadowrun was published in 1994, FASA released a revised and expanded edition of The Grimoire, a 142-page book written by Mark Chaffe, Thomas A. Dowd, Paul R. Hume , Steve Kenson, Christopher Kubasik , and Carl Sargent, with cover art by Thomas Baxa and illustrations by Janet Aulisio, Joel Biske, Dell Harris, Dana Knutson, Jeff Laubenstein, Mike Medynsky, Jim Nelson, Mike Nielsen, Anthony Szczudlo, and Karl Waller.

== Reception ==
In Issue 23 of White Wolf (October–November 1990), Steve Wieck commented, "If you're a Shadowrun gamer, you need Grimoire. It's a very good sourcebook and it takes the magic system of Shadowrun far beyond what is offered by other role-playing games (except perhaps Ars Magica). Unfortunately, with this new, incredibly vast magic system, come a lot of rules to digest." Wieck conlcluded by rating this book 4 out of 5.

In the November 1992 edition of Dragon (Issue #187), Allen Varney wrote, "The book amazes me. On every page, you find new ideas, always presented with a shrewd sense of playability in the campaign." While he complimented the wide range of material, saying "all of these should provoke ideas for mage PCs and GMs alike", he also noted that the new material's "learning curve strikes me as steep, their upper reaches open mainly to power gamers who study the subject as closely as real mages would." Nonetheless, Varney concluded that "Few works treat game magic with such authenticity, such awareness of the roles magic has played in society from ancient times to the present — and the future."

In the Spanish magazine Dragón, Alex Miquel called this book "a complete, well-designed, and illustrated manual that will delight any cybermage who dares to set foot in the world of Shadowrun.

In Issue 75 of the French gaming magazine Casus Belli, Croc reviewed the second edition of this book and noted that "the characters are more powerful, certainly, but also endowed with numerous little role-playing touches that make them more alive and richer." Croc concluded, "In summary, a superb expansion very similar to its predecessor. A must-have."

In Issue 10 of the Australian gaming Magazine Australian Realms, Malcolm Adler reviewed the second edition, and called it a worthwhile investment, noting, "The new edition of The Grimoire carries a lot of the same information as the first, but it’s been cleared up and greatly improved, in alignment with the core rules. Many of the topics covered have been developed and refined presenting Shadowrunners everywhere with more choice and danger than ever before." Adler concluded, "The only complaint | can make is that it would have been better to have more new material in The Grimoire. For existing players, this release of The Grimoire is a satisfying expansion of the Shadowrun second edition, for new players it is pretty much essential reading."
