= Fields of Fire (Shadowrun) =

1994 supplement to role-playing game

- Designers: Thomas A. Dowd
- Illustrators: Luis Royo; Earl Geier; Rick Harris; Mike Jackson
- Publishers: FASA
- Publication: 1994
- Genres: Cyberpunk

Fields of Fire is a supplement published by FASA in 1994 for the second edition of the cyberpunk role-playing game Shadowrun.

== Descriptions ==
Fields of Fire focuses on mercenaries, but also expands of the everyday lives of Shadowrunners (player characters) in general.

The book is divided into three parts:

1. "Fields of Fire": An introduction to the mercenary profession that includes rules mercenaries must follow, mistakes they must avoid in order to survive, likely clients, and the types of operations they will be hired for. A list of the main hotspots on each continent is included, as well as a possible evolution of the profession in the near future.
2. "Field Pack": A catalog of military equipment from handguns to rocket launchers, including camouflage and protective equipment, tactical equipment, and land and air vehicles.
3. "Rules": New game rules for managing combat and the battlefield.

An index contains a complete list of the characteristics of weapons, ammunition, accessories, explosives, clothing and armor, everyday items, surveillance and security equipment, cybernetic implants, cyberdecks and programs, magical equipment, and vehicles taken from previously published Shadowrun publications such as Street Samurai Catalog, and Rigger Black Book.

== Publication history ==
FASA released the first edition of the near future cyberpunk role-playing game Shadowrun in 1989. A second edition followed in 1992, as well as several supplements and scenarios. One of these was Fields of Fire, a 112-page softcover book designed by Thomas A. Dowd, with cover art by Luis Royo, and interior art by Earl Geier, Rick Harris, and Mike Jackson. It was published by FASA in 1994.

== Reception ==
In Issue 17 of the Australian game magazine Australian Realms, Malcolm Adler noted that the utility of this book would depend on the focus of the gamemaster's campaign, writing, "The book is good and its usefulness will solely depend on how much your game leans on such things as mercenaries, hot spots and combat (or equipment) heavy play. If any of these things are integral aspects of your game the book is worth a purchase, or at least a good look, otherwise view it as not necessary but still a handy reference." Adler concluded by calling it "An expansion for those needing a little new fire in the belly."

In Issue 84 of the French games magazine Casus Belli, Mathias Twardowski commented, "This isn't one of those catalogs of ultra-violent killing machines like we see all too often in cyberpunk games. If it features new weapons, it's because the market and technology are changing, and it reflects those changes ... All of this is very cleverly done and contributes to reinforcing the authenticity and realism of the world." Twardowski approved of the index of equipment from other Shadowrun books, pointing out, "These comprehensive tables summarize all the available material (a rare touch among American games), thus eliminating the need to purchase previous supplements and providing everything in a single booklet."

In Issue 2 of the French games magazine Backstab, Croc noted, "All the information is engaging and enjoyable to read, but we were still expecting to learn a bit more about the mercenaries' motivations, lives, missions, and tactics ... We simply would have liked to know more, especially for a 112-page supplement." Croc also pointed out that although the equipment lists were extensive, the expensive items like lasers and large military vehicles "are useless for the average player." Croc found the chapter on new rules disappointing, noting this was "very poorly presented. It consists of a slew of rule changes for everything related to combat, without any index or logical order. It's not even clear whether these rules are mandatory or optional. A real hodgepodge, with good and bad stuff thrown together ... It's often well thought out, but terribly difficult to use." Croc concluded by giving this book a rating of 6 out of 10, saying "this supplement leaves me with a distinctly uneasy feeling. It's a typical example of a rushed supplement written by someone talented (Tom Dowd), which makes it readable and even enjoyable at times, but I'm convinced that with a little more time, more contributors, or even a broader subject (war in general), it could have been a masterpiece. What a shame."

== Other reviews and commentary ==
- Rollespilsmagasinet Fønix (Issue 4 - September/October 1994, in Danish)
- The Shadowrun Supplemental (Vol 1, Issue 1 - 1997)
