= Bug City =

Supplement for the role-playing game Shadowrun

Bug City is a supplement published by FASA in 1994 for the dystopian cyberpunk science fantasy role-playing game Shadowrun.

== Contents ==
Bug City is a 160-page softcover book that was designed by Robert Cruz, Tom Dowd, Mike Nystul, Diane Piron-Gelman, and Christopher Kubasik, with interior art by Jim Nelson, Tom Baxa, Peter Bergting, Joel Biske, Earl Geier, Jeff Laubenstein, Larry MacDougall, and Jeff Miracola, and cover art by Rick Berry and Mike Nielsen.

Using the Shadowrun rules system, this adventure is one of three supplements that describes the story arc of the 2057 United American and Canadian States presidential election. Bug City is set in Chicago, where giant insects have magically appeared. Government authorities have isolated the city within a "Containment Zone", trapping a million people along with the ravenous insects. Players control characters that are in the Containment Zone.

=== The election ===
FASA allowed Shadowrun players to vote on which of the six unusual candidates would win the presidential election of 2057. In the 2014 book Designers & Dragons, author Shannon Appelcline wrote "By the mid-'90s FASA was innovating its storyline. The game's metaplot had always been important, but now players were given the chance to influence the United Canadian and American States Election of 2057 by voting for the new president. This plot ran through Bug City (1994), Super Tuesday (1996), and Dunkelzahn's Secrets (1996). Some felt the intended outcome was pushed by FASA, but nonetheless the dragon Dunkelzahn was elected based on player votes — then promptly assassinated."

== Reception ==
Angel Leigh McCoy reviewed Bug City in White Wolf Inphobia #56 (June, 1995), rating it a 5 out of 5 and stated that "Shadowrun gamemasters, go out and get this! The challenges and discoveries of Bug City will thrill your players, and if nothing else, you'll enjoy reading it."

In the November 1995 edition of Dragon (Issue #223), Rick Swan thought the premise of the book was "highly amusing." Swan did find the introduction section boring, although "once past the introduction, the book comes alive, presenting a riveting look at a besieged community that’s half ant farm, half leper colony." Although he found the illustrations "first-rate", he thought the maps "leave a lot to be desired." He found the game mastering section "provides excellent staging tips and a terrific set of optional rules." Swan thought elements of the book needed more development, specifically the insects — "Each insect species receives just a page or so of description, far too little to adequately cover their life cycles, social structures, and personalities" — and a lot of intriguing but under-explored concepts. He also noted that referees had a lot of homework reading to do, since Bug City references nearly a dozen other Shadowrun sourcebooks. However, Swan concluded by giving the book an above average rating of 5 out of 6, saying, "a cast of characters this engaging makes Bug City hard to resist."

== Awards ==
Bug City won the Origins Awards for Best Graphic Presentation of a Roleplaying Game, Adventure, or Supplement of 1995.

== Reviews ==
- Rollespilsmagasinet Fønix (Danish) (Issue 8 - May/June 1995)
- Australian Realms #22
