= Street Samurai Catalog =

Role-playing game supplement

Second edition (1996), cover art by Steve Venters

Street Samurai Catalog is a supplement published by FASA in 1989 for the near-future cyberpunk role-playing game Shadowrun.

== Contents ==
Street Samurai Catalog is a supplement that includes game statistics for new weapons, vehicles, cyberware, and additional accessories, using the conceit that this is the equipment catalog of a fictional company called Ares. The book is divided into two parts: items for the general public and items for security and quasi-military forces. As well as a variety of firearms and personal weaponry, several cybernetic implants are also described. Each item takes up one page and is accompanied by an illustration.

The book also includes new rules for some of the items, new street samurai archetypes, and a blank street samurai character sheet.

== Publication history ==
Street Samurai Catalog was written by Tom Dowd and was published by FASA in 1990 as a 116-page softcover book, with illustrations by Timothy Bradstreet, Jeff Laubenstein, and Karl Martin, and cover art by Steve Venters.

In 1996, the book was updated with the rules for the second edition of Shadowrun, resulting in a slightly smaller page count of 109 pages.

In 1999, more material was taken from the book after it had been updated with the rules for Shadowrun 3. It was subsequently divided between Man & Machine: Cyberware (1999) and Cannon Companion (2000).

== Reception ==
Stephan Wieck reviewed Street Samurai Catalog for White Wolf #20, rating it 3 out of 5 overall and stating that "If you've got [the money] to spare I'd say buy it because you will enjoy it and the Catalog will enrich your Shadowrun campaign, but you can get by without it."

In the November 1992 edition of Dragon (#187), Allen Varney said that this book "belong[s] in any Shadowrun game player's library." Varney noted the items listed in the book already "figure prominently in many of the published adventures." He concluded with a strong recommendation, saying, "its extensive illustrations, samurai archetypes, and cyberware rules enhance every campaign."

Several months later, in the April 1993 edition of Dragon (Issue #192), Rick Swan was less impressed. Although he liked some of the items in the book, namely the cyberguns and shock gloves, he found that "too many mundane items (such as precision arrows and — yawn — survival knives) result in a less-than-memorable volume." He concluded that the book was not worth the money, pointing out that "each entry fills an entire page, much of it empty space, which hardly makes this a bargain."

== Reviews ==
- Casus Belli #69 (May 1992)
