= Dreamchipper =

1989 scenario book for the Shadowrun RPG

Dreamchipper is an adventure published by FASA in 1989 for the cyberpunk near-future role-playing game Shadowrun.

== Publication history ==
Dreamchipper is an 80-page book written by James D. Long, with a cover by Dave Dorman, and published by FASA in 1989.

== Plot summary ==
Several prototype military grade personality chips programmed to replicate the personalities of historical figures Jack the Ripper, Cleopatra, and Genghis Khan have been stolen. The shadowrunners (the player characters) are hired to retrieve the chips.

== Reception ==
In the April 1990 edition of Dragon (Issue #156), Ken Rolston called this "good, gritty cyberpunk, well organized and entertaining, with a solid action-adventure story line." Rolston complimented the adventure for being broken into short and manageable episodes, and also for allowing enough leeway to allow for the players' "characterization and divergent problem solving." Rolston concluded with a thumbs up, saying, "The Shadowrun game is one of the hottest role-playing settings at present, and this is a good example of how that setting can translate into dramatic action-adventure role-playing."

Stephan Wieck reviewed Dreamchipper for White Wolf #20, rating it 4 out of 5 overall, and stated that "I found Dreamchipper to be a very good adventure. It's [sic] plot centers around cyberpunk technology and involves some of the psychological strangeness prevalent in cyberpunk literature."

In the May 1990 edition of Games International, Lee Brimmicombe-Wood admired the production quality of the book, which he called "up to the usual excellent standard." He also liked the "street atmosphere" of the scenario, and complimented it because "the annoying fantasy element doesn't intrude." Brimmicombe-Wood concluded by giving this adventure an average rating of 7 out of 10, saying, "Dreamchipper runs at a slower pace than its predecessor Mercurial, but there's much more scope for character interaction and there are enough lead-ons to make it an excellent kick-off for any campaign."

== Other reviews ==
- Games Review (Volume 2, Issue 5 - Feb 1990)
