= Paul Hume =

Paul Hume may refer to:

- Paul Hume (music critic)
- Paul Hume (game designer)
