= Shadowrun Game Master's Screen =

Shadowrun Game Master's Screen is a 1989 role-playing game supplement published by FASA for Shadowrun.

== Contents ==
Shadowrun Game Master's Screen is a supplement in which a gamemaster's screen includes an adventure scenario called "Silver Angel", where the player characters are hired to steal a specific file from a megacorp's data banks. It also provides more information on Seattle and includes cardstock miniatures for standard character archetypes.

== Publication history ==
Shadowrun Game Master's Screen was written by Tom Dowd, with illustrations by Joel Biske, James Nelson, Jeff Laubenstein, and Earl Geier, and was published by FASA in 1989 as a 32-page booklet, a cardstock screen, a sheet of cardstock miniatures, and a cover sheet.
