= Space Quest (disambiguation) =

Space Quest may refer to:

- Space Quest, a video game series
  - Space Quest I, the first game in the series
- SpaceQuest, Ltd., a spacecraft components and engineering company
- Space Quest Casino, a space-themed casino
- "Space Quest" (Frasier), a 1993 television episode
- Space Quest (role-playing game), a tabletop role-playing game
