= Harlequin (Shadowrun) =

Role-playing game adventure

Harlequin is an adventure campaign published by FASA in 1990 for the near-future dystopian role-playing game Shadowrun.

== Description ==
Harlequin is a 151-page book designed by Tom Dowd, Ken St. Andre, John Faughnan, W. G. Armintrout, Jerry Epperson, Paul R. Hume, Lester W. Smith, and James L. Long. The various adventures in the book are specifically designed to be interspersed between other adventures, rather than being run sequentially, so that the players don't immediately realize there's a connection between the various adventures. The ultimate result or consequence of the missions is not revealed in this book, even to the gamemaster. Author Tom Dowd wrote, "Future game products will be based on hidden elements of Harlequin [...] GMs are not the only ones who might read an adventure book so we don’t want to give away any surprises.”

== Plot summary ==
Harlequin is a series of adventures in which the shadowrunners are sent on a series of missions to solve a puzzle.

== Reception ==
Matthew Gabbert reviewed Harlequin in White Wolf #26 (April/May, 1991), rating it a 4 out of 5 and stated that "I really only have to criticisms of this otherwise superior supplement. First, there doesn't seem to be much of a build-up in suspense or difficulty as one progresses through the segments - they're almost too isolated. And second, there is simply an unacceptable number of typos and printing errors, especially among the maps and diagrams. However, with its original concept and bountiful content, I still recommend Harlequin unreservedly."

In the November 1992 edition of Dragon (Issue #187), Allen Varney did not like the "hidden ending" that would be revealed in later publications, but thought "Harlequin achieves striking effects through its component sections’ cumulative power. The first moment that the team realizes the connection between disparate scenarios is magical." Varney concluded that the book largely achieves ambitious goals.

Scott Taylor of Black Gate in 2015 rated the Harlequin series as #9 in "The Top 10 Campaign Adventure Module Series of All Time, saying "Truly, these two volumes are an inspiration to those who believe that series adventures can strive to be productive beyond the swords & sorcery gaming genre."

== Awards ==
In 1991, Harlequin won the Origins Award for Best Roleplaying Adventure of 1990.

== Reviews ==
- Envoyer #5
