= Denver: The City of Shadows =

Denver: The City of Shadows is a supplement published by FASA in 1994 for the near-future cyberpunk role-playing game Shadowrun.

== Contents ==
Denver: The City of Shadows is a campaign setting boxed set for the second edition rules of Shadowrun. It was designed by Nigel D. Findley, Bill Lenox, Tom Wong, and Tom Dowd, with interior art by Joel Biske, Steve Bryant, Paul Daly, Earl Geier, Rick Harris, Jeff Laubenstein, Dan Smith, and Karl Waller, and cover art by Dave McCoy and Jim Nelson.

The set contains:

- a 168-page players' book
- a 64-page gamemaster's book
- a 22" x 34" map sheet
- two laminated travel passes

The books detail Denver in the game of Shadowrun, including its six political sectors (each of which has its own laws, culture, and black market trade.)

== Reception ==
Jeffrey W. Cisneros reviewed Denver Boxed Set in White Wolf #46 (Aug., 1994), rating it a 3 out of 5 and stated that "Overall, I recommend this product. For all its problems it still makes a useful addition to any Shadowrun campaign. And, if we don't support FASA's efforts to maintain the Shadowrun line, the company might not support it either."

In the April 1995 edition of Dragon (Issue #216), Rick Swan was cool to the boxed set, stating that "Despite its ambition, Denver is basically a water-treader, a look at a familiar setting from a different angle [...] It's a good read, but it's not much of a reference." Swan concluded by giving Denver: The City of Shadows an average rating of 4 out of 6, saying, "Experienced players should find Denver irresistable — providing, of course, they're willing to navigate all the silly lingo."

== Reviews ==
- Casus Belli #84 (Dec 1994)
- Rollespilsmagasinet Fønix (Danish) (Issue 6 - January/February 1995)
- Australian Realms #20
