= Shadows of the Underworld (Shadowrun) =

Shadows of the Underworld is a 1996 role-playing game supplement published by FASA for Shadowrun.

== Plot summary ==
Shadows of the Underworld is an adventure in which a collection of five interconnected adventures builds on the political intrigue of the 2057 presidential campaign in the United Canadian and American States, and these scenarios immerse players in the schemes of rival candidates whose influence reaches deep into the criminal underworld. As the election looms, tensions rise and the stakes climb, turning shadowruns into high-risk operations. The adventures lean into classic genre conventions—with contracts and escalating chaos—but offering plot twists and narrative variety. The adventures span several locales.

== Publication history ==
Shadows of the Underworld is a sequel to Super Tuesday!.

== Reception ==
Andy Butcher reviewed Shadows of the Underworld for Arcane magazine, rating it a 6 out of 10 overall, and stated that "yet another impressive selection of short adventures from FASA. Unfortunately, though, there are two drawbacks to Shadows of the Underworld. For a start it's not going to be a lot of use unless you're including the election in your campaign - it would be hard work to alter most of the adventures to work without their political background. Perhaps, more importantly, they're set in a variety of locations, including New York and California, as well as trusty Seattle. Once again, you could alter them to fit elsewhere, but not without some work."
