= Downtown Militarized Zone =

Role-playing game supplement

Cover art by John Zeleznik

Downtown Militarized Zone is a board wargame published by FASA in 1990 that is set in the same near-future cyberpunk universe as the role-playing game Shadowrun.

== Contents ==
Downtown Militarized Zone is a two-player board wargame that simulates street combat in the Shadowrun setting. Each player takes one or more characters from the Shadowrun setting, represented by stand-up cardboard cutouts, and tries to defeat the other player's side. As in Shadowrun, the Rule Book covers the use of magic in combat. Movement is covered, including the use of vehicles such as motorcycles.

A second booklet titled "Archetypes" lists the combat capabilities of every character class, and non-player character class published to that date.

The game comes with many maps of urban landscapes that can be used to design combat scenarios. It also comes with four combat scenarios of increasing difficulty. The game can also be used as a quick substitute for the usual combat rules in Shadowrun, although one critic noted that it doesn't save any time, and is considerably more lethal.

== Publication history ==
FASA published the cyberpunk role-playing game Shadowrun in 1989, and followed up with many role-playing adventures and supplements. To serve as an introduction for new players to the Shadowrun setting and aesthetic, Tom Dowd, Sam Lewis and Jordan Weisman designed the board wargame Downtown Militarized Zone. It was published by FASA in 1990 as a boxed set with cover art by John Zeleznik that contained a 72-page Rule Book and 48-page Archetypes book, both lavishly illustrated by Dana Andrews, Joel Biske, Tim Bradstreet, Sean R. Cannon, Todd Hamilton, Rick Harris, Chuck Harris, Karl Kochvar, Jeff Laubenstein, Larry MacDougall, Jim Nelson, and Mike Nielson. The box also included several full-color mapsheets and stand-up character counters.

== Reception ==
In Issue 26 of White Wolf (April/May 1991), Matthew Gabbert liked the look of the boxed set, noting, "As usual, FASA has spent no expense on production values ... the maps and counters are truly impressive — even if you decide to toss the DMZ rules, these visual aids cold be invaluable in any Shadowrun campaign." However, in terms of its intended purpose, Gabbert gave it a rating of 3 out of 5, saying, "While it succeeds as a board game, with both simple mechanics and a relatively fresh milieu, it fails as a Shadowrun supplement. It isn't really any faster and, by the designer's admission, it's a whole lot deadlier to characters and NPCs alike. Unless you just aren't getting enough wholesale slaughter in your campaign, or unless everyone in your group chips in to get the maps and counters, I recommend leaving DMZ in the Distorted Marketing Zone."

In Issue 61 of the French games magazine Casus Belli, the game designer Croc found the exterior of the box very inviting — "the most beautiful cover of any game published in a while" — but was somewhat puzzled as to the game's usefulness, commenting, "I don't really see what it can be used for. As a system for resolving mass combat, it falls short ... As a board game simulating tactical combat with firearms, there are much better ones." Croc also pointed out that game only comes with four scenarios "which is absolutely scandalous, especially since no point system has been devised to balance the two sides." Croc did think that the game could be used by a gamemaster to test out possible combat encounters that involve the player characters. But Croc concluded, "I expected a lot from this game (again from that damn cover!) so I was a little disappointed."

== Other reviews ==
- GamesMaster International (Issue 7 - Feb 1991)
- Computer+Videogiochi 21
