= Virtual Realities 2.0 =

Shadowrun role-playing game supplement

Virtual Realities 2.0 is a supplement published by FASA in 1995 for the dystopian cyberpunk role-playing game Shadowrun.

== Contents ==
Virtual Realities 2.0 is a supplement which presents a simplified and streamlined system to use with decker characters and hacking on the Matrix.

== Publication history ==
Virtual Realities 2.0 was written by Paul Hume with Carl Sargent, and Michael Mulvihill.

== Reception ==
In the February 1996 edition of Arcane (Issue 3), Andy Butcher gave it an above-average rating of 8 out of 10, saying, "Virtual Realities 2.0 is one of the most impressive Shadowrun rules supplements ever, and any referee who has even the slightest interest in player-character deckers will find it indispensable. It doesn't solve all the problems, but it makes things a lot easier."

In the March 1996 edition of Dragon (Issue 227), Rick Swan called this book "essential", saying, "As veteran netrunners will confirm, the cumbersome Matrix system has always been the weakest element of the Shadowrun game. FASA comes to the rescue with this overdue revision, which trims the fat from the original, upgrades the rules for Matrix mapping, and, in general, makes cyberspace a more enjoyable place to play."

== Reviews ==
- Australian Realms #27
