= Dragon Hunt (Shadowrun) =

Role-playing game adventure

Cover art by John Zeleznik

Dragon Hunt is an adventure published by FASA in 1991 for the cyberpunk role-playing game Shadowrun that uses some of the more fantasy-oriented aspects of the game.

== Plot summary ==
Dragon Hunt is an adventure set in Seattle in which a badly injured and amnesiac young dragon hires the player characters to find out who he is and who wanted to kill him. The investigation takes the characters into the seamier side of large corporations and the elastic ethics of some researchers.

== Publication history ==
FASA released the cyberpunk role-playing game Shadowrun in 1989, and published several adventures and supplements for the original game. One of these was Dragon Hunt, created by Michael Lee and published in 1991 as a 64-page softcover book with cover art by John Zeleznik and interior art by Joel Biske, Rick Harris, Jeff Laubenstein, and Jim Nelson.

== Reception ==
In Issue 28 of White Wolf, Matthew Gabbert was disappointed in this adventure, calling the writing only of average quality, and questioning some key premises of the adventure, noting "it is awfully hard to believe that a dragon could crash into Seattle General Hospital without attracting at least a little bit of media attention." Gabbert called the adventure's greatest flaw its "thoroughly aggravating ending." Gabbert concluded by giving this adventure a rating of only a 2 out of 5, saying, "Unless you're feeling more than a trifle vindictive with your players or you're a mystery buff who doesn't mind doing some significant rewriting, I'd make like Eliohann the Dragon and just try to forget this one."

In Issue 88 of the French games magazine Casus Belli, Mathias Twardowski called this "A scenario that makes full use of the magical background of Shadowrun, which gives it a unique tone." Twardowski concluded, "It's completely off the beaten track. Not to be missed under any circumstances, this is the quintessence of cyberpunk adventure."
