= Mercurial (Shadowrun) =

Tabletop role-playing game supplement

Cover art by Jeff Laubenstein, 1989

Mercurial is an adventure published by FASA in 1989 for the near-future cyberpunk role-playing game Shadowrun.

== Plot summary ==
The adventure is set in Seattle in 2050. The Runners are hired to protect the rock star Maria Mercurial from her former manager, who apparently wants to harm her after she broke their contract. Soon it becomes clear that this is not a simple bodyguarding gig, as first a Yakuza gang and then a second group appears, and details of Maria's unhappy past begin to surface.

== Publication history ==
Following the publication of the role-playing game Shadowrun in 1989, FASA immediately followed up with the first adventure supplement Mercurial, an 80-page softcover book written by Paul Hume, with interior art by Joel Biske, Timothy Bradstreet, Barry Crain, Tammy Daniels, Tara Gallagher, Earl Geier, Rick Harris, and Jim Nelson, and cover art by Jeff Laubenstein.

== Reception ==
In the January 1990 edition of Games International (Issue 12), Lee Brimmicombe-Wood admired the production and layout, especially the "debugging" instruction for gamemasters in each section, "for getting players back on track if they wander off course." Although Brimmicombe-Wood thought the adventure "fairly straightforward and unchallenging [...] little more than a linear shoot-em-up", he admitted that the adventure possessed "enough pizzazz and ideas to make it rattle along at a furious pace [...] it's loud and noisy enough to keep a largish group of players happy for a couple of sessions." Brimmicombe-Wood didn't like an element of fantasy included in the thriller plot, "confirming that FASA have yet to get the cyberpunk/fantasy blend right." Brimmicombe-Wood concluded by giving the adventure an average rating of 3 out of 5, saying, "for a referee who is not afraid to handle plenty of action and turn up the style this is a tight, compact little scenario to throw (grenade-like) at his or her group. Handle with care."

In the May 1990 edition of White Wolf (Issue #20), Stephan Wieck gave it an above average rating of 4 out of 5 overall, stating, "Mercurial's only weakness may be that some of its storyline transitions are difficult for the players to follow and for gamemaster to run."
