= Sprawl Sites =

Tabletop role-playing game supplement

Cover art by Steve Venters, 1990

Sprawl Sites is a supplement published by FASA in 1990 for the near-future cyberpunk role-playing game Shadowrun.

== Contents ==
Sprawl Sites is a supplement that presents material about cities in a cyberpunk setting that a gamemaster can use to provide a deeper background for an adventure. Material covered includes:

- maps and building blueprints of places like a bank, a bus station, restaurants, and a hospital;
- random encounter tables;
- new archetypes such as dwarf mercenary or ex-tribal warrior;
- various non-player characters;
- background information such as weapons permits and credsticks.

== Publication history ==
Sprawl Sites was written by Boy F. Petersen Jr., John Faughnan, and Mike Stackpole, with a cover by Steve Venters, and was published by FASA in 1990 as a 96-page softcover book. Illustrations are by Earl Geier, Jeff Laubenstein, and Jim Nelson, and cover art is by Steve Venters.

== Reception ==
Stephan Wieck reviewed Sprawl Sites for White Wolf #20, rating it 5 out of 5 overall, and stated that "The Sprawl Sites sourcebook is an incredible reference for Shadowrun GMs. The book is well organized and easy to use. Your campaign shouldn't be without it."

In the November 1992 edition of Dragon (#187), Allen Varney called this book "an unusually useful Swiss Army knife of a supplement." He pointed out that the many unrelated items could be a lifesaver for a referee, and related his own experience of needing a blueprint of a typical city fire station map, which is available in this book. Varney commented that he was "no fan of either random-encounter tables or maps, but when you need them, Sprawl Sites presents them with imagination and without pretension." He concluded, "The game background's intricacy rewards those who undertake a full campaign. For this I strongly recommend Sprawl Sites."

== Reviews ==
- Polyhedron #75
