= Cybertechnology =

Tabletop role-playing game supplement

Cybertechnology is a supplement published by FASA in 1995 for the dystopian near-future cyberpunk role-playing game Shadowrun.

== Contents ==
Cybertechnology details new high-tech cyberware weaponry that can be implanted into Shadowrun characters. The book also covers the revolutionary technique known as Cybermancy, which allows characters to survive having negative Essence ratings.

== Publication history ==
Cybertechnology was written by Tom Dowd, Carl Sargent, Diane Piron-Gelman, and Michael Mulvihill.

== Reception ==
In the December 1995 edition of Arcane (Issue 1), Andy Butcher was ambivalent about the book, saying, "Cybertechnology isn't a bad book – it's well written, and provides potentially useful insights and information about cyberware in Shadowrun. Anyone looking for the equivalent of Cyberpunk 2020's Chromebooks, though, will be disappointed."

In the February 1996 edition of Dragon (Issue 226), Rick Swan thought that "Cybertechnology wastes a lot of space on lame commentary" and believed it was not as good a value as the similarly themed Hardware/Software supplement written for Shatterzone.

== Reviews ==
- Australian Realms #26
