= Missions (Shadowrun) =

Missions is a 1997 role-playing game adventure published by FASA for Shadowrun.

== Plot summary ==
Missions is an adventure in which an adventure collection is designed to showcase the expanded campaign possibilities introduced in the Shadowrun Companion. It includes four distinct scenarios, each tailored to a unique role: Lone Star detectives investigating a gang, DocWagon security specialists protecting a transport, corporate operatives or journalists uncovering secrets linked to Dunkelzahn's will, and military special forces confronting a rogue leader.

== Reception ==
Andy Butcher reviewed Missions for Arcane magazine, rating it a 6 out of 10 overall, and stated that "there are plenty of ideas here, many of which are adaptable to a wide range of games. Not a 'must have', then, but interesting stuff all the same."

A review for Świat Gier Komputerowych describes Misje, the first Polish-language scenario supplement for Shadowrun, as a strong addition to the system, praising Shadowrun’s distinctive blend of cyberpunk, fantasy elements, and corporate-dominated politics. Released in Poland by Wydawnictwo ISA, the book contains four one-session scenarios that can optionally be linked into a campaign and are designed for four to six players, preferably using characters affiliated with specific in-game organizations described in an earlier supplement. The reviewer highlights the variety of roles offered—ranging from corporate security and emergency response teams to media crews and government commandos—and singles out one scenario as particularly strong. The supplement is praised for its clear structure, supporting materials such as maps and handouts, and ease of use for game masters. While recommended primarily as a diversion from ongoing campaigns rather than as integrated material, the review concludes that Missions provides engaging and well-designed gameplay experiences.
