= Paranormal Animals of North America =

Supplement for the game Shadowrun

Cover art by James Nelson, 1990

Paranormal Animals of North America is a supplement published by FASA in 1990 for the dystopian near-future role-playing game Shadowrun.

== Contents ==
Paranormal Animals of North America, the first bestiary published for Shadowrun, is a supplement presenting "awakened animals", creatures that the innate magic of the land has altered into mythical forms. It includes eighty creatures and also "details the magical powers of the Awakened species of Shadowrun". Each creature occupies two of the book's 175 pages with a picture and description. Reviewer Stephan Wieck stated that the pictures are "phenomenal".

== Publication history ==
Paranormal Animals of North America is a 176-page softcover book written by Nigel D. Findley, with interior art by Jeff Laubenstein, Joel Biske, Dana Knutson, Todd M. Marsh, and James Nelson, and cover art by Nelson. It was published by FASA Corp. in 1990.

== Reception ==
Stephan Wieck reviewed the product in the August–September 1990 issue of White Wolf. He rated it at 4 of 5 points, noting only one drawback in that most of the creatures lived outside of the normal urban setting of the game. He stated that "The wealth of information the book contains, as well as its quality writing and art, make it well worth the investment".

== Reviews ==
- Polyhedron #86
