= Target: Awakened Lands =

Role-playing game supplement

Target: Awakened Lands is a 2001 role-playing game supplement published by FanPro for Shadowrun.

== Contents ==
Target: Awakened Lands is a supplement in which the magic areas of the Australian Outback are explored.

== Reviews ==
- Pyramid
- Envoyer
- The Shadowrun Supplemental (Issue 16 - Dec 2001)
