= Lone Wolf (Shadowrun novel) =

Lone Wolf is a 1994 novel published by Roc.

== Plot summary ==
Lone Wolf is a novel in which Rick Larson is a Lone Star officer working undercover in a dangerous Seattle gang.

== Reception ==
Angel Leigh McCoy reviewed Lone Wolf in White Wolf Inphobia #50 (Dec., 1994), rating it a 3 out of 5 and stated that "This novel captures a great deal of the Shadowrun atmosphere, so is valuable simply for setting the tone of your game. It's also valuable as a diversion, carryning you away with its events. Isn't that one of the marks of worthwhile fiction?"

== Reviews ==
- Review by Norman Beswick (1994) in Vector 179
