= Corporate Shadowfiles =

Tabletop role-playing game supplement

Corporate Shadowfiles is a supplement published by FASA in 1993 for the dystopian cyberpunk role-playing game Shadowrun.

== Contents ==
Corporate Shadowfiles is a 140-page softcover book by Nigel Findley that details the operations of future 21st-century megacorporations, how large corporations are structured, and some basic economics.

== Reception ==
Angel Leigh McCoy reviewed Corporate Shadowfiles in White Wolf #41 (March, 1994), rating it a 3.5 out of 5 and stated that "Corporate Shadowfiles is an especially valuable resource if you actively use corporations in your futuristic campaigns, whether you're using Shadowrun or another game."

In the December 1993 edition of Dragon (Issue #200), Rick Swan was not a fan of the book, which he said examined its subject matter "in lengthy, often excruciating detail." Swan found the tone to be stuffy and professorial, and concluded by advising gamers to give it a pass: "Business majors may enjoy sifting through 140-plus pages of this, but others probably will find it excessive."

== Reviews ==
- Casus Belli #78
- Australian Realms #14
