= Eye Witness =

Tabletop role-playing game adventure

Eye Witness is an adventure published by FASA in 1994 for the near-future dystopian fantasy cyberpunk role-playing game Shadowrun.

== Description ==
Eye Witness is 72-page softcover book written by Mike Nystul that describes the details of a complete Shadowrun adventure.

== Plot summary ==
A young investment broker in Seattle is turned into a goblin by a genetic quirk, and he replaces the human employees of his company with ghouls. Troubleshooters (the players) are sent in to put things back to normal by terminating the ghouls.

== Reception ==
In the June 1994 edition of Dragon (Issue #206), Rick Swan thought this adventure was far more memorable than many recent Shadowrun publications, "thanks to the satirical subtext added to the usual mix of fantasy and cyberpunk." He concluded with a recommendation, saying, "[Author] Nystul balances the chills with chuckles, and his rollicking plot should leave even in the most jaded Shadowrun-ners gasping for breath."

Angel Leigh McCoy reviewed Eye Witness in White Wolf #47 (Sept., 1994), rating it a 3 out of 5 and stated that "All groups like to perform a 'typical' shadowrun from time to time. Eye Witness provides some interesting NPCs and source material for Seattle, but other than that, it is little more than an entertaining scenario."

== Reviews ==
- Backstab #5
