= Germany Sourcebook =

Germany Sourcebook is a 1994 role-playing supplement for Shadowrun published by FASA.

== Contents ==
Germany Sourcebook is a supplement in which Germany is detailed for the game setting.

== Publication history ==
Germany Sourcebook was first written by Germans and then translated to English.

== Reception ==
Angel Leigh McCoy reviewed Germany Sourcebook in White Wolf Inphobia #50 (Dec., 1994), rating it a 3.5 out of 5 and stated that "If your game is set anywhere in Europe or characters are traveling to somewhere else in Europe, you will want this book. It offers a comprehensive understanding of the Awakening's effects on Germany and Europe as a whole."

== Reviews ==
- Rollespilsmagasinet Fønix (Issue 3 - July/August 1994)
- The Fifth Annual Neo-Anarchists Guide to Everything Else (1994)
- Australian Realms #16
