= Shadows of North America =

Role-playing game supplement

Shadows of North America is a 2001 role-playing game supplement published by Fanpro for Shadowrun.

== Contents ==
Shadows of North America is a supplement in which information is provided about each of the regions of North America.

== Reviews ==
- Pyramid
- Backstab #45 (as "L'Amérique des Ombres")
