= Tir na nOg (Shadowrun) =

Role-playing game supplement

Tir na nOg is a 1993 role-playing supplement for Shadowrun published by FASA.

== Contents ==
Tir na nOg is a supplement in which the veil has been lifted between the world and the faerie world in Ireland.

== Reception ==
Angel Leigh McCoy reviewed Tír na nÓg in White Wolf #44 (June, 1994), rating it a 4 out of 5 and stated that "Aside from detailing the culture, politics and history of Tír na nÓg, this sourcebook gives information on creating a character from the isle, and specifically offers information on creating a druid. Overall, it's a worthwhile addition to any Shadowrun collection."

== Reviews ==
- Australian Realms #15
- The Shadowrun Supplemental (Vol 1, Issue 1 - 1997)
