= Mob War! =

Mob War! is a 1997 role-playing game adventure published by FASA for Shadowrun.

== Plot summary ==
Mob War! is an adventure in which 24 loosely structured adventure ideas are offered, stemming from the assassination of Seattle Mafia boss Don James O'Mally. It provides a flexible campaign framework organized into timelines—or "tracks"—for four major crime syndicates: the Mafia, Yakuza, Triads, and Seoulpa Rings. These interwoven narratives allow game masters to adapt events to their players' actions. The supplement also includes a chapter on dragon crime lords.

== Reception ==
Lucya Szachnowski reviewed Mob War! for Arcane magazine, rating it a 6 out of 10 overall, and stated that "Although [the price] isn't a bad price to pay for a scenario supplement, it might seem a little high considering that the adventures are only really in outline format. Also, you cannot easily run Mob War! without buying the Underworld Sourcebook as well. FASA could have provided better value for money by combining them both in one book."

== Reviews ==
- Valkyrie #15 (1997)
