= Elven Fire =

Role-playing game adventure

Elven Fire is a 1991 role-playing adventure for Shadowrun published by FASA.

== Plot summary ==
Elven Fire is an adventure in which the player characters encounter the elven street gang known as the Ancients.

== Reception ==
Matthew Gabbert reviewed Elven Fire in White Wolf #32 (July/Aug., 1992), rating it a 4 out of 5 and stated that "Elven Fire is an excellent scenario. The characters are well-developed and intelligent, with clear motivations and objectives. The plot, while refreshingly intricate, isn't so convoluted as to be absurd."

== Reviews ==
- KA•GE (Volume 1, Issue 3 - 1st Quarter 1992)
- Challenge #63
