= Underworld Sourcebook =

1997 role-playing game supplement

Underworld Sourcebook is a 1997 role-playing game supplement published by FASA for Shadowrun.

== Contents ==
Underworld Sourcebook is a supplement in which the criminal underbelly of North America is explored in the year 2058. The supplement is primarily written from a Seattle-centric perspective, with coverage extending across the continent. The book details the operations, politics, and turf wars of the four major international crime syndicates—the Mafia, Yakuza, Triads, and Seoulpa Rings—as well as smaller gangs vying for influence. It includes rules for playing criminal or law-enforcement characters. The supplement provides material for adding intrigue and danger to existing plots, especially in the wake of major in-universe events like the assassination of the dragon Dunkelzahn and the recent hit on Seattle's Mafia Capo. The content is presented in the form of in-world online discussions.

== Reception ==
Lucya Szachnowski reviewed Underworld Sourcebook for Arcane magazine, rating it an 8 out of 10 overall, and stated that "The amount of factual material in the 112-page book doesn't leave a lot of room for artwork, but that is a minor criticism. The cover art is dark, evocative and fitting, but the quality of the material used for the jacket isn't great. My copy quickly became dog-eared and the picture started to flake off."

== Reviews ==
- Envoyer #48 (as "Unterwelt Quellenbuch")
