= Dragons of the Sixth World =

Dragons of the Sixth World is a 2003 role-playing game supplement published by FanPro for Shadowrun.

== Contents ==
Dragons of the Sixth World is a supplement in which dragon biology, culture, magic, and machinations are detailed, profiling major great dragons and their networks while also detailing the influential Draco Foundation.

== Reviews ==
- Pyramid
- Fictional Reality #13
