= Year of the Comet (Shadowrun) =

Role-playing game supplement

Year of the Comet is a 2001 role-playing game supplement published by FanPro for Shadowrun.

== Contents ==
Year of the Comet is a supplement in which Halley's Comet returns to mark the 50th anniversary of the Awakening.

== Publication history ==
Shannon Appelcline noted that after FanPro licensed Shadowrun from FASA in early 2001, with Rob Boyle as line editor, "FanPro was able to get Shadowrun going again almost immediately. Boyle's biggest concern as he revved up the line was continuing the game's metaplot. Year of the Comet (2001) thus introduced Shadowrun's newest story - involving the return of Halley's comet - which continued in Wake of the Comet (2002). The storyline introduced a new dragon - another holdover from Earthdawn as it happens - and that story was resolved in Survival of the Fittest (2002), though its repercussions would continue to affect the Shadowrun universe afterward."

== Reviews ==
- Envoyer
- Backstab #33
- Backstab #38 (as "L'annee de la Comete")
- Pyramid
