= London Sourcebook =

Role-playing game supplement

London Sourcebook is a 1991 role-playing supplement for Shadowrun published by FASA.

== Contents ==
London Sourcebook is a supplement in which London is detailed, from its aristocracy to its ghettos.

== Reception ==
Matthew Gabbert reviewed London Sourcebook in White Wolf #30 (Feb., 1992), rating it a 5 out of 5 and stated that "As George Bernard Shaw one put it, 'England and America are two great nations separated by a common language.' While that sentiment still seems to hold true in the mid-21st Century, if the London Sourcebook is any indication, that separation can yet be spanned by people of sufficient vision and imagination."

== Reviews ==
- Saga (Issue 13 - Apr 1992)
- The Shadowrun Supplemental (Vol 1, Issue 1 - 1997)
- Casus Belli #65
