= Portfolio of a Dragon: Dunkelzahn's Secrets =

Portfolio of a Dragon: Dunkelzahn's Secrets is a 1996 role-playing game supplement published by FASA for Shadowrun.

== Contents ==
Portfolio of a Dragon: Dunkelzahn's Secrets is a supplement in which the significant repercussions of the Great Dragon Dunkelzhan's assassination just moments after being elected president of the United Canadian and American States are explored. Framed through the Shadowland Bulletin Board System, the book presents both the events of that fateful night and the far-reaching implications of Dunkelzhan's Last Will and Testament—a document designed to steer the course of the Sixth World even after his death. Packed with commentary from in-world personas, the sourcebook offers insight into political power plays, conspiracies, and the enduring reach of immortal agendas. It serves as a narrative resource and also as a tool for gamemasters to launch new campaigns, build tension, and drive player decisions with real-world consequences. The Will alone offers dozens of branching possibilities for adventure seeds, many of which can be tailored to low-powered groups despite the backdrop's grand scale.

== Reception ==
Andy Butcher reviewed Portfolio of a Dragon: Dunkelzahn's Secrets for Arcane magazine, rating it a 9 out of 10 overall, and stated that "politics can be a powerful tool for the ref of any roleplaying game, and few sourcebooks illustrate this as well as Portfolio of a Dragon. Any Shadowrun ref will find this a fascinating read and a highly useful source of inspiration and ideas."

== Reviews ==
- Australian Realms #30
