= Space Quest (role-playing game) =

Tabletop role-playing game

Space Quest is a tabletop role-playing game published by Tyr Gamemakers Ltd. in 1977.

== Description ==
Space Quest is a science-fiction space-adventure system, an early class-and-level game. The rules cover character abilities, caste and rank, skills, races, psionics, and character classes: spacers, warriors, mutates (psionics), technics, or biotechs. The game also includes rules for starships and equipment. Space encounters include traders, pirates, roboids, and space monsters such as voidsharks.

== Publication history ==
Space Quest was designed by Paul Hume and George Nyhen, and published by Tyr Gamemakers Ltd. in 1977 as a 110-page digest-sized book.

== Reception ==
Robert C. Kirk reviewed Space Quest in The Space Gamer No. 14. Kirk commented that "Given an imaginative gamemaster and daring players, Space Quest can become an open-ended campaign providing hours of fun, escapism, or what-have-you."

Steve Winter reviewed Space Quest in The Space Gamer No. 33. Winter commented that "There are innovations in Space Quest which can be added to any system, and material that will enrich any campaign. Dropping the character classes and redesigning the class powers would make this a really good shoot-the-BEM-and-grab-the-girl space opera system. I would recommend it for any serious SF referee, if only for the hardware and incidentals."

== Reviews ==
- Fantastic Science Fiction v27 n10
