= Native American Nations Volume Two =

Native American Nations Volume Two is a 1991 role-playing supplement for Shadowrun published by FASA.

== Contents ==
Native American Nations Volume Two is a supplement in which four of the Native American Nations countries are detailed.

== Reception ==
Matthew Gabbert reviewed Native American Nations, Volume Two in White Wolf #30 (Feb., 1992), rating it a 3 out of 5 and stated that "Native American Nations, Volume Two is a good supplement caught in a marketing goof. Allocating nearly half the book to an adventure, even a good one, is a mistake. Players should probably hold off on purchasing this supplement if their GM plans on running the adventure portion. Otherwise, the NAN source material makes this book essential for your Shadowrun library."

== Reviews ==
- The Shadowrun Supplemental (Vol 1, Issue 1 - 1997)
- KA•GE (Volume 1, Issue 2 - Winter 1991)
