= Survival of the Fittest (Shadowrun) =

Survival of the Fittest is a 2002 role-playing game adventure published by FanPro for Shadowrun.

== Plot summary ==
Survival of the Fittest is an adventure in which a seven-part adventure series has the death of the great dragon Dunkelzahn spark a global draconic power struggle, sending shadowrunners on interconnected missions across exotic locales and metaplanes as ancient traditions collide with modern schemes.

== Reviews ==
- Pyramid
- Envoyer
