= Threats (Shadowrun) =

Tabletop role-playing game supplement

- Publisher: FASA
- Publication date: 1996
- Pages: 104
- ISBN: 1555602908

Threats is a 1996 role-playing game supplement for Shadowrun published by FASA.

== Contents ==
Threats is a sourcebook presenting conspiracy theories about 14 dangerous organizations and entities.

== Reception ==
Andy Butcher reviewed Threats for Arcane magazine, rating it a 7 out of 10 overall. Butcher comments that "As well as offering alternatives to the traditional corporate bad guys, the book expands Shadowrun's scope. Referees may not find themselves directly using a great deal of the material presented here, but they will certainly find a lot of inspiration for their games."

== Reviews ==
- Envoyer #6
- Envoyer #7
- Casus Belli #96
