= Total Eclipse (Shadowrun) =

Total Eclipse is a 1991 role-playing adventure for Shadowrun published by FASA.

== Plot summary ==
Total Eclipse is an adventure in which the player characters are hired to steal from a popular rock band.

== Reception ==
Matthew Gabbert reviewed Total Eclipse in White Wolf #30 (Feb., 1992), rating it a 3 out of 5 and stated that "Despite its superficial shortcomings, this story's fast-moving and free-flowing plot makes it a winner. If you want a good one- or two-night adventure that let's your players think for themselves, you'd be safe looking at Total Eclipse."

== Reviews ==
- Challenge #63
- KA•GE (Volume 1, Issue 2 - Winter 1991)
