= Native American Nations Volume One =

Role-playing game supplement

Native American Nations Volume One is a 1991 role-playing supplement for Shadowrun published by FASA.

== Contents ==
Native American Nations Volume One is a supplement in which the Amerindian coalition of the Native American Nations is detailed.

== Reception ==
Matthew Gabbert reviewed Native American Nations: Volume One in White Wolf #29 (Oct./Nov., 1991), rating it a 3 out of 5 and stated that "On the whole, Native American Nations: Volume One is a disappointment. Allotting over half the book to an uninspiring adventure is a mistake I hope FASA doesn't repeat. However, the source material still makes this supplement a must for Shadowrun GMs, although players who expect to try the adventure should hold on to their wampum for a few moons."

== Reviews ==
- The Shadowrun Supplemental (Vol 1, Issue 1 - 1997)
