= Magic in the Shadows =

- Publisher: FASA
- Publication date: 1999

Magic in the Shadows is a 1999 role-playing game supplement published by FASA for Shadowrun.

== Contents ==
Magic in the Shadows is a supplement in which magic is detailed using basic and advanced rules.

== Reviews ==
- Pyramid
- Backstab (as "La Magie du 6ème Monde")
- The Seventh Neo-Anarchist's Guide to Everything Else #7
- Fictional Reality (Issue 12 - Jun 2003)
- Legions Realm Monthly (Issue 8 - Apr 2003)
- The Shadowrun Supplemental (Issue 10 - 1999)
- Casus Belli #121
