= Ivy & Chrome =

Ivy & Chrome is a 1991 role-playing adventure for Shadowrun published by FASA.

== Plot summary ==
Ivy & Chrome is an adventure in which a mysterious patron hires the player characters to find a missing young girl.

== Reception ==
Matthew Gabbert reviewed Ivy & Chrome in White Wolf #29 (Oct./Nov., 1991), rating it a 4 out of 5 and stated that "Ivy & Chrome is one of the best Shadowrun adventures I've sampled in a long time. If you're looking for an easy-to-run, straightforward story that doesn't make you scramble every time your players come up with an original thought, this one's for you."
