= Shadowrun Companion =

Role-playing game sourcebook

Cover of the revised book for the 3rd edition from 1998

Shadowrun Companion is a sourcebook published by FASA in 1996 for the near-future cyberpunk role-playing game Shadowrun.

== Contents ==
Shadowrun Companion is a sourcebook featuring expanded rules for Shadowrun. The content includes:

- Chapter 1: Expanded rules and options for character creation.
- Chapter 2: New skills
- Chapter 3: Advice for gamemasters on how mega-corporations might hire shadowrunners
- Chapter 4: Potential contacts and enemies of the player characters.
- Chapter 5: A wide variety of new rules on various subjects.
- Chapter 6: How to run a game
- Chapter 7: Using the Shadowrun rules in other genres of role-playing games

== Publication history ==
Following the publication of Shadowrun in 1989, FASA published a second edition in 1992. To expand the possibilities and options in the game, FASA published Shadowrun Companion in 1996, a 136-page softcover book designed by Jennifer Brandes, Zach Bush, Chris Hepler, Chris Hussey, Jonathan Jacobson, Steve Kenson, Michael Mulvihill, Linda Naughton, and Brian Schoner, with artwork by Doug Alexander, Janet Aulisio, Tom Baxa, Joel Biske, Brian Despain, Fred Hooper, Mike Jackson, Larry MacDougall, James Nelson, Mike Nielsen, Paolo Parente, Matt Wilson, and Mark Zug.

Following the publication of the third edition of Shadowrun in 1998, FASA published a new edition of Shadowrun Companion in 1998.

== Reception ==
In Issue 16 of the British fantasy magazine Arcane, Andy Butcher pointed out the gap between the publication of the third edition of Shadowrun and its Companion, saying, "The biggest problem with The Shadowrun Companion is that for many fans of the game it's going to be about five years too late. Any dedicated Shadowrun group will probably have already come up with their own rules for the situations covered here." Butcher was also of two minds about the contents, calling the book, "a somewhat curious beast, being by its very nature varied in what it covers. Unfortunately, although much of the book is well written and designed, it's somewhat variable in quality. [...] many of the new rules systems are poorly explained and overly complex — somewhat ironic, considering that one of the aims of the book is to clarify the game." Butcher concluded by giving the book an average rating of 7 out of 10, commenting, "Less experienced Shadowrun refs will find it very handy, but those with more experience will have to weigh up whether they really need enough of this stuff to make it worthwhile."

== Other reviews and commentary ==
- SF Site
- Envoyer #58
- Shadis #34
- Casus Belli #101
