= Super Tuesday! =

1996 role-playing game adventure for Shadowrun

Super Tuesday! is a 1996 role-playing game adventure published by FASA in 1996 for the dystopian near-future cyberpunk role-playing game Shadowrun.

== Contents ==
Super Tuesday! is a 112-page softcover book designed by Stephen Kenson and Tom Dowd, with interior art by Tom Baxa, Peter Bergting, Kevin Long and Karl Waller, and cover art by Jim Nelson. The book is an anthology of five Shadowrun adventures set during the 2057 United Canadian and American States presidential campaign, presenting background information regarding the election and detailing the six unusual candidates.

== Reception ==
In the June 1996 edition of Arcane (Issue 7), Andy Butcher commented that "five good adventures (if a little on the short side) and valuable background information on the 2057 election (the storyline of which is scheduled to run through several forthcoming Shadowrun releases) isn't a bad deal." He concluded by giving the anthology an above average rating of 7 out of 10.

In the October 1996 edition of Dragon (Issue #234), Rick Swan called the anthology "another first-rate FASA production." Swan thought the writing had "an appealingly light touch." He really liked two of the adventures, and thought another two "failed to engage." He concluded by calling this "a must for Shadowrunners with a sense of humor", and gave the book an average rating of 4 out of 6.

== Reviews ==
- Australian Realms #28
