= Rigger Black Book =

- Series: Shadowrun
- Publisher: FASA
- Publication date: 1991
- ISBN: 1555601693

Rigger Black Book is a 1991 role-playing supplement for Shadowrun published by FASA.

== Contents ==
Rigger Black Book is a supplement in which 90 vehicles receive illustrated descriptions, along with rules for using vehicles.

== Reception ==
Matthew Gabbert reviewed Rigger Black Book in White Wolf #31 (May/June, 1992), rating it a 3 out of 5 and stated that "Overall, the Rigger Black Book is a pretty good supplement, but you end up paying for an awful lot of wasted space and good-to-poor artwork. With a tighter format and smaller pictures, it could have been done in half the pages and for two-thirds the price. Still, if you love riggers and you think they should have all the latest toys, it's probably worth the investment."

== Reviews ==
- Challenge #60
- Alarums & Excursions (Issue 200 - Apr 1992)
- The Gamer (Issue 2 - Mar 1992)
- The Shadowrun Supplemental (Vol 1, Issue 1 - 1997)
- KA•GE (Volume 1, Issue 3 - 1st Quarter 1992)
- Casus Belli (Issue 69 - May 1992)
- Dragon #192
