= Lee Brimmicombe-Wood =

British game designer (born 1963)

Lee Brimmicombe-Wood (born 7 December 1963 in London) is a British designer of board games and video games. He also wrote Aliens: Colonial Marines Technical Manual.
