= Man & Machine: Cyberware =

Role-playing game supplement

- Publisher: FASA
- Publication date: 1999

Man & Machine: Cyberware is a 1999 role-playing game supplement published by FASA for Shadowrun.

== Contents ==
Man & Machine: Cyberware is a supplement in which the available cybernetic gear is expanded.

== Reviews ==
- Envoyer
- Backstab (as "La chair et le chrome")
- Fictional Reality (Issue 16 - Jun 2004)
- The Shadowrun Supplemental (Issue 11 - 1999)
- Pyramid
