= Cannon Companion =

Cannon Companion is a 2000 role-playing game supplement published by FASA for Shadowrun.

== Contents ==
Cannon Companion is a supplement in which game statistics are provided for weapons and other gear.

== Reviews ==
- Pyramid
- Backstab
- The Ninth Annual Neo-Anarchists Guide to Everything Else
- The Shadowrun Supplemental (Issue 12 - 2000)
