= Paul Hume (game designer) =

American role-playing game designer

Paul Hume is a designer of role-playing games. He co-wrote, with Bob Charrette, Bushido, Aftermath!, and Daredevils for Fantasy Games Unlimited. He is also a co-author of Shadowrun, among other games.

== Career ==
Paul Hume and George Nyhen designed the role-playing game Space Quest, which was published in 1977 by Tyr Gamemakers. Hume and Bob Charrette designed the game Bushido, which was first published in limited distribution by Hume through his small press company Tyr Games. Bushido was republished by Phoenix Games in 1980; Phoenix Games was also preparing to publish Aftermath! (1981) also by Hume and Charrette, but as the company went defunct, Fantasy Games Unlimited reprinted Bushido in 1981, and stickered their logo over the Phoenix Games logo on the cover of Aftermath!. Hume and Charrette also collaborated on Daredevils, published by FGU in 1982. Hume and Charette designed the Shadowrun role-playing game, first published in 1989. Hume also designed the Shadowrun adventure Mercurial (1990).

== Awards ==
The Shadowrun 2nd Edition rules from FASA, by Tom Dowd with Paul Hume and Bob Charrette, won the Origins Award for Best Roleplaying Rules of 1992.
