= Tom Dowd (game designer) =

American game designer

- Occupation: Game designer

Thomas A. Dowd is a game designer who has worked primarily on role-playing games.

== Career ==
Thomas Dowd was one of the writers who created supporting material for the Villains and Vigilantes role-playing game from Fantasy Games Unlimited. The Shadowrun 2nd Edition rules from FASA, by Dowd with Paul Hume and Bob Charrette, won the Origins Award for Best Roleplaying Rules of 1992. Dowd was working at FASA in 1990 when he met Peter Adkison, who was trying to understand how the gaming industry worked, and Dowd advised him to attend the next Gama Trade Show in March 1991. Mark Rein-Hagen turned to Dowd to design his new game about vampires, because Jonathan Tweet was his expert in game mechanics but left Lion Rampant in 1989. Dowd refined the dice pool system from Shadowrun to repurpose it for Vampire: The Masquerade (1991) from White Wolf. Dowd worked with Rein-Hagen to adapt the core mechanics from his previous game success to use d10 instead of d6 for calculating probability.
