= Jeff Laubenstein =

American fantasy artist

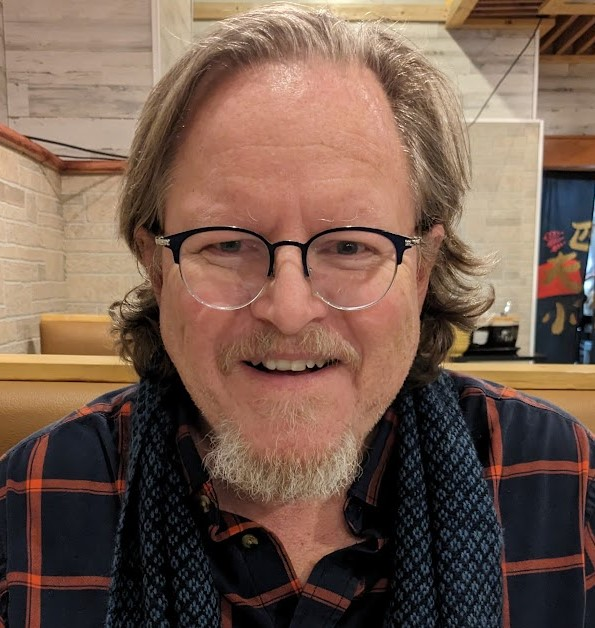
Laubenstein in 2023

Jeff Laubenstein is an American fantasy artist specializing in watercolor who has produced artwork for several game publishers, and is especially well known for developing the look and feel of the cyberpunk role-playing game Shadowrun and the fantasy role-playing game Earthdawn. He has also created many pieces of artwork for the collectible card game Magic: The Gathering.

== Early life ==
Jeff Laubenstein was born in Chicago and raised in Schaumburg, Illinois. While growing up, Laubenstein had an interest in drawing, and often would sketch characters from Saturday morning cartoons like Snoopy and Scooby-Doo, and scenes from movies such as Planet of the Apes and Godzilla. He was also introduced to the fantasy role-playing game Dungeons & Dragons, and he began to delve into the fantasy art milieu.

Laubenstein's drawing style was influenced by the French comic book artists Enki Bilal and Jean Giraud (Mœbius), and "Golden Age" illustrators N.C. Wyeth and Maxfield Parrish.

In 1986, Laubenstein graduated from Northern Illinois University with a Bachelor of Fine Arts in Illustration.

== Career ==
Soon after graduating, Laubenstein began working at game publisher FASA, working on Shadowrun where he illustrated nearly all of the NPC portraits. Laubenstein's art also appeared in MechWarrior: The Battletech Role Playing Game (1986), and Star Trek: The Role Playing Game. At Gencon 1993, Laubenstein was approached by Jesper Myrfors, the art director for a new game company called Wizards of the Coast (WotC), to do some artwork for the company's new collectible card game (CCG) called Magic: The Gathering (M:TG) that was premiering at Gencon. However, Laubenstein's manager felt M:TG was a competing game, and did not give Laubenstein permission.

In 1993, Laubenstein became the art director for FASA's new role-playing game Earthdawn. Jesper Myrfors had kept asking Laubenstein for artwork for M:TG, and finally in 1996, FASA gave Laubenstein permission to create art for the CCG. He created artwork for many cards including "Show and Tell" and "Recurring Nightmare".

After working at FASA for over a decade, Laubenstein moved to Terraglyph Interactive Studios to work as art director on various Nintendo and PlayStation video games. In addition to contributing more artwork to M:TG, Laubenstein also became a regular contributor to Dragon and various products published by White Wolf Publishing. Laubenstein has also done artwork for the fantasy CCG Sorcery: Contested Realm published by Erik's Curiosa, as well as six issues of the comic book Rust.

== Reception ==
In Issue 8 of Fright Night, Tony Caputo complimented Laubenstein for his work on the comic book series Rust, saying, "Rust is not only continuing to sell out, but growing steadily in readership! If you like the off the wall and unique, and dig watercolor illustrations, Jeff Laubenstein has created an issue that will shock the optic nerve!"

In 2014, Scott Taylor of Black Gate named Laubenstein as #8 in a list of The Top 10 RPG Artists of the Past 40 Years, saying "His work appeared in every product the company [FASA] ever created after his hiring, and he was the driving force for the design of the groundbreaking cyberpunk Shadowrun RPG in which he was responsible for all the iconic archetypes as well as a multitude of NPCs archetypes."

In his 2023 book Monsters, Aliens, and Holes in the Ground, RPG historian Stu Horvath reviewed the dystopian role-playing game Shadowrun and noted, "Tim Bradstreet and Jeff Laubenstein also deliver some stellar, street-level illustration work."

== Awards ==
In 2001, Laubenstein was a finalist for a Chesley Award in the category "Best Gaming-Related Illustration", for his work on Castles and Covenants (White Wolf Publishing).
