= List of Marvel RPG supplements =

Below is a list of role-playing game supplements based on properties of Marvel Comics.

== History ==
The original Marvel Super Heroes game was published by TSR. It received extensive support from TSR, covering a wide variety of Marvel Comics characters and settings, including a Gamer's Handbook of the Marvel Universe patterned after Marvel's Official Handbook of the Marvel Universe. MSH even received its own column in the (at the time) TSR-published gaming magazine, Dragon, called "The Marvel-phile", which usually spotlighted a character or group of characters that had not yet appeared in a published game product.

Before losing the Marvel license, TSR published a different game using their SAGA System game engine, called the Marvel Super Heroes Adventure Game. This version, written by Mike Selinker, was published in the late 1990s as a card-based game. Though critically praised in various reviews at the time, it never reached a very large market and has since faded into obscurity.

In 2003, after the gaming license had lapsed, the Marvel Universe Roleplaying Game was published by Marvel Comics themselves. This edition uses mechanics that are totally different from any previous versions, using a diceless game mechanic that incorporated a Karma-based resolution system of "stones" (or tokens) to represent character effort. Since its initial publication, a few additional supplements were published by Marvel Comics. However, Marvel stopped supporting the game a little over a year after its initial release.

In 2012, the fourth role playing game set in the Marvel Universe called the Marvel Heroic Roleplaying was published by Margaret Weis Productions under license from Marvel Comics. It was a fast playing game using the Cortex Plus system. In early 2013 Margaret Weis Productions announced they would not be renewing their license.

In 2021, Marvel announced it would be releasing a new role-playing game titled the Marvel Multiverse Role-Playing Game designed by Matt Forbeck and published by Marvel Universe.

== Supplements ==
Marvel RPGs – Supplements Index
Publisher	System	Marvel #	TSR #	ISBN	Label	Year	Orig. Price	Pages
TSR	MSH	-	5371	ISBN 0-394-54020-4	Unpainted Metal Miniatures Set # 1 (12 figures)	1984	$12.00	
TSR	MSH	-	5372	ISBN 0-394-55424-8	Unpainted Metal Miniatures Set # 2 (12 figures)	1984	?	
TSR	MSH	-	5375	?	Unpainted Metal Miniatures Set # 3 (6 figures)	1985	?	
TSR	MSH	-	5376	ISBN 0-88038-473-5	Unpainted Metal Miniatures Set # 4	1986	$12.00	
TSR	MSH	-	5377	ISBN 5-551-65663-2	Unpainted Metal Miniatures Set # 5	1986	?	
TSR	MSH	-	6890	ISBN 0-88038-750-5	Deluxe City Campaign Set (box)	1989	$18.00	
TSR	MSH	-	6896	ISBN 0-88038-888-9	The Uncanny X-Men Campaign Set (box)	1990	$18.00	
TSR	MSH	-	6900	ISBN 1-56076-087-7	Marvel Superheroes Basic Set (revised edition) (box)	1991	$20.00	
TSR	MSH	MA0	6871	ISBN 0-88038-368-2	Marvel Super Heroes Advanced Set	1986	$15.00	
TSR	MSH	MA1	6872	ISBN 0-88038-292-9	Children of the Atom	1986	$12.00	
TSR	MSH	MA2	6874	ISBN 0-88038-293-7	Avengers – Coast to Coast	1986	$12.00	
TSR	MSH	MA3	6876	ISBN 0-88038-413-1	The Ultimate Powers Book	1987	$12.00	
TSR	MSH	MA4	6889	ISBN 0-88038-483-2	The Fantastic Four Compendium	1987	$8.95	
TSR	MSH	ME1	6879	ISBN 0-88038-547-2	Cosmos Cubed	1988	$5.95	
TSR	MSH	ME2	6880	ISBN 0-88038-568-5	Ragnarok & Roll	1988	$5.95	
TSR	MSH	ME3	6882	ISBN 0-88038-583-9	The Left Hand of Eternity	1988	$7.95	
TSR	MSH	MH0	6850	ISBN 0-88038-345-3	Marvel Superheroes Basic Set (original edition) (box)	1984	$15.00	
TSR	MSH	MH1	6851	ISBN 0-88038-125-6	The Breeder Bombs (X-Men)	1984	$6.00	
TSR	MSH	MH2	6853	ISBN 0-88038-127-2	Time Trap (Avengers)	1984	$6.00	
TSR	MSH	MH3	6855	ISBN 0-88038-129-9	Murderworld! (Fantastic Four)	1984	$6.00	
TSR	MSH	MH4	6859	ISBN 0-88038-131-0	Lone Wolves (Daredevil, Black Widow, Power Man, Iron Fist)	1984	$6.00	
TSR	MSH	MH5	6857	ISBN 0-88038-132-9	Cat's Paw (Alpha Flight)	1984	$6.00	
TSR	MSH	MH6	6862	ISBN 0-88038-198-1	Thunder over Jotunheim (Thor)	1985	$6.00	
TSR	MSH	MH7	6864	ISBN 0-88038-225-2	The Last Resort (West Coast Avengers)	1985	$6.00	
TSR	MSH	MH8	6866	ISBN 0-88038-227-9	Fault Line (Spider-Man & Avengers)	1985	$7.95	
TSR	MSH	MH9	6867	ISBN 0-88038-228-7	Gates of What If? (Spider-Man, FF, Avengers)	1985	$7.95	
TSR	MSH	MHAC1	6852	ISBN 0-88038-126-4	Judge's Screen	1984	$6.00	
TSR	MSH	MHAC2	6854	ISBN 0-88038-128-0	Avengers Assembled!	1984	$6.00	
TSR	MSH	MHAC3	6856	ISBN 0-88038-130-2	Adventure Foldup Figures	1984	$6.00	
TSR	MSH	MHAC4	6858	ISBN 0-394-54576-1	Pit of the Viper (incl. Adventure Foldup Figures)	1984	$6.00	
TSR	MSH	MHAC5	6861	ISBN 0-88038-193-0	Project Wideawake	1985	$6.00	
TSR	MSH	MHAC6	6863	ISBN 0-88038-199-X	New York, New York	1985	$6.00	
TSR	MSH	MHAC7	6865	ISBN 0-88038-226-0	Concrete Jungle: Official Character Roster	1985	$6.00	
TSR	MSH	MHAC8	6868	ISBN 0-88038-229-5	Weapons Locker	1985	$6.00	
TSR	MSH	MHAC9	6870	ISBN 0-88038-278-3	Realms of Magic	1986	$12.00	
TSR	MSH	MHR1	6905	ISBN 1-56076-403-1	X-Forces Mutant Update (box)	1992	$15.00	
TSR	MSH	MHR2	6907	ISBN 1-56076-405-8	Webs: Spider-Man Dossier (box)	1993	$15.00	
TSR	MSH	MHR3	6908	ISBN 1-56076-406-6	Avengers Archive (box)	1993	$15.00	
TSR	MSH	MHR4	6906	ISBN 1-56076-404-X	Lands of Dr. Doom (box)	1992	$20.00	
TSR	MSH	MHSP1	6860	ISBN 0-88038-184-1	Secret Wars I	1984	$6.00	
TSR	MSH	MHSP2	6869	ISBN 0-88038-268-6	Secret Wars II	1986	$6.00	
TSR	MSH	MLA1	6892	ISBN 0-88038-832-3	After Midnight	1990	$8.95	
TSR	MSH	MLA2	6895	ISBN 0-88038-874-9	Night Moves	1990	$8.95	
TSR	MSH	MLA3	6897	ISBN 0-88038-893-5	Night Life	1990	$8.95	
TSR	MSH	MLBA1	6893	ISBN 0-88038-841-2	Mutating Mutants	1990	$5.95	
TSR	MSH	MSL1	6899	ISBN 1-56076-066-4	X-Terminate	1991	$6.95	
TSR	MSH	MSL2	6901	ISBN 1-56076-100-8	Warlord of Baluur	1991	$6.95	
TSR	MSH	MSL3	6902	ISBN 1-56076-101-6	Spore of Arthros	1991	$6.95	
TSR	MSH	MSL4	6904	ISBN 1-56076-103-2	Stygian Knight	1991	$6.95	
TSR	MSH	MT1	6885	ISBN 0-88038-718-1	All This and World War II	1989	$7.95	
TSR	MSH	MT2	6886	ISBN 0-88038-741-6	The Weird, Weird West	1989	$8.95	
TSR	MSH	MT3	6891	ISBN 0-88038-777-7	The Revenge of Kang	1989	$8.95	
TSR	MSH	MU1	6878	ISBN 0-88038-540-5	Gamer's Handbook of the Marvel Universe – Abomination through Dreadnought	1988	$13.95	
TSR	MSH	MU2	6881	ISBN 0-88038-576-6	Gamer's Handbook of the Marvel Universe – Eel through Mad Dog	1988	$13.95	
TSR	MSH	MU3	6883	ISBN 0-88038-601-0	Gamer's Handbook of the Marvel Universe – Mad Thinker through Sentry	1988	$13.95	
TSR	MSH	MU4	6884	ISBN 0-88038-617-7	Gamer's Handbook of the Marvel Universe – Serpent Society through Zzzax	1988	$13.95	
TSR	MSH	MU5	6887	ISBN 0-88038-766-1	Gamer's Handbook of the Marvel Universe – 1989 Characters Update	1989	$15.95	
TSR	MSH	MU6	6894	ISBN 0-88038-866-8	Gamer's Handbook of the Marvel Universe – 1990 Characters Update	1990	$15.95	
TSR	MSH	MU7	6903	ISBN 1-56076-102-4	Gamer's Handbook of the Marvel Universe – 1991 Characters Update	1991	$15.95	
TSR	MSH	MU8	6909	ISBN 1-56076-407-4	Gamer's Handbook of the Marvel Universe – 1992 Characters Update	1992	$15.95	
TSR	MSH	MU9	?	ISBN 1-56076-600-X	Gamer's Handbook of the Marvel Universe – 1993 Characters Update	1993	$15.95	
TSR	MSH	MX1	6873	ISBN 0-88038-402-6	Nightmares of Futures Past	1986	$8.00	
TSR	MSH	MX2	6875	ISBN 0-88038-403-4	The X-Potential	1987	?	
TSR	MSH	MX3	6877	ISBN 0-88038-481-6	Reap the Whirlwind	1987	$5.95	
TSR	MSH	MX4	6888	ISBN 0-88038-482-4	Flames of Doom	1987	$5.95	
TSR	MSHAGB	-	8021	ISBN 0-88038-299-6	Adventure Gamebook #1 – Amazing Spider-Man – City in Darkness	1986	$2.95	
TSR	MSHAGB	-	8022	ISBN 0-88038-300-3	Adventure Gamebook #2 – Captain America – Rocket's Red Glare	1986	$2.95	
TSR	MSHAGB	-	8023	ISBN 0-88038-301-1	Adventure Gamebook #3 – The Wolverine – Night of the Wolverine	1987	$2.95	
TSR	MSHAGB	-	8024	ISBN 0-88038-435-2	Adventure Gamebook #4 – Doctor Strange – Through Six Dimensions	1987	$2.95	
TSR	MSHAGB	-	8025	ISBN 0-88038-436-0	Adventure Gamebook #5 – The Thing – One Thing After Another	1987	$2.95	
TSR	MSHAGB	-	8026	ISBN 0-88038-437-9	Adventure Gamebook #6 – The Uncanny X-Men – An X-cellent Death	1987	$2.95	
TSR	MSHAGB	-	8027	ISBN 0-88038-438-7	Adventure Gamebook #7 – Amazing Spider-Man – As the World Burns	1988	$2.95	
TSR	MSHAGB	-	?	ISBN 0-88038-533-2	Adventure Gamebook #8 – Daredevil – Guilt by Association	1988	$2.95	
TSR	OOOAGB	-	8468	ISBN 0-88038-305-4	One-on-One Adventure Gamebook #8 – The Fantastic Four vs. Doctor Doom – The Doomsday Device	1986	?	
TSR	OOOAGB	-	?	ISBN 0-88038-459-X	One-on-One Adventure Gamebook #9 – Daredevil vs. Kingpin – The King Takes a Dare	1987	$5.95	
TSR	OOOAGB	-	?	ISBN 0-88038-518-9	One-on-One Adventure Gamebook #11 – Doctor Strange and the High Priest of Set – Prisoner of Pharaoh's Tomb	1989	?	
WotC	MSHAG	-	6926	ISBN 0-7869-1227-8	Marvel Superheroes Adventure Game (box)	1998	$24.95	
WotC	MSHAG	-	6927	ISBN 0-7869-1228-6	X-Men Roster Book	1998	$17.95	
WotC	MSHAG	-	6928	ISBN 0-7869-1229-4	X-Men: Who Goes There?	1998	$8.95	
WotC	MSHAG	-	6929	ISBN 0-7869-1230-8	A Guide to Marvel Earth	1998	$15.95	
WotC	MSHAG	-	6930	ISBN 0-7869-1231-6	Avengers Roster Book	1998	$17.95	
WotC	MSHAG	-	6931	ISBN 0-7869-1232-4	Avengers: Masters of Evil	1998	$8.95	
WotC	MSHAG	-	11320	ISBN 0-7869-1320-7	Fantastic Four Roster Book	1999	$18.95	
WotC	MSHAG	-	11330	ISBN 0-7869-1330-4	Fantastic Four: Fantastic Voyages	1999	$8.95	
WotC	MSHAG	-	11340	ISBN 0-7869-1340-1	The Reed Richards Guide to Everything	1999	$16.95	
WotC	MSHAG	-	?	ISBN 0-7869-1409-2	Marvel Team-Up Roster Book	1999	$18.95	
WotC	MSHAG	-	?	?	The Green Goblin's Guide to Crime	1999	?	
WotC	MSHAG	-	?	?	Age of Apocalypse	1999	?	
WotC	MSHAG	-	-	-	Wolverine vs. the Brood Queen	1999	-	
WotC	MSHAG	-	?	-	Adventurer's Guild – Series 3 – Throne of Huangdi	1998	-	
WotC	MSHAG	-	?	-	Adventurer's Guild – Series 4 – Avengers: Live Kree or Die!	1998	-	
WotC	MSHAG	-	?	-	Adventurer's Guild – Series 5 – Pages of Doom	1999	-	
WotC	MSHAG	-	?	-	Adventurer's Guild – Series 7 – Smoke and Mirrors	1999	-	
Marvel	MU	MVL11028	-	ISBN 0-7851-1028-3	Marvel Universe RPG (hc)	2003	$24.99	
Marvel	MU	MVL11035	-	ISBN 0-7851-1035-6	Guide to the X-Men	2003	$19.99	
Marvel	MU	MVL11158	-	ISBN 0-7851-1158-1	Guide to the Hulk & the Avengers	2003	$19.99	
Marvel	MU	MVL11305	-	ISBN 0-7851-1305-3	Guide to Spider-Man's NYC	2004	$19.99	
Marvel	MU	MVL11353	-	ISBN 0-7851-1353-3	Guide to Wolverine	2004	$19.99	
MWP	MH	-	-	ISBN 1-9366-8516-7	Marvel Heroic Roleplay Basic Game	2012	$19.99	128
MWP	MH	-	-	ISBN 1-9366-8515-9	Civil War - Essentials Event Book	2012	$ ?	160
MWP	MH	-	-	ISBN 1-9366-8517-5	Civil War - Premium Event Book	2012	$49.99	226
MWP	MH	-	-	ISBN 1-9366-8518-3	Civil War - 50 States Initiative	2013	$ ?	
MWP	MH	-	-	ISBN 1-9366-8519-1	Civil War - Young Avengers/Runaways	2013	$ ?	
MWP	MH	-	-	ISBN 1-9366-8520-5	Civil War - X-Men	2013	$ ?	

== Gallery ==
Mutating Mutants, an RPG by Bruce Nesmith; cover by Jeff Butler; publisher TSR

== See also ==
- Super Hero Players Package by Sage Lore Productions
