= Cosmos Cubed =

Role-playing game adventure

- Cover art by Jeff Butler
- Designers: Troy Denning
- Publishers: TSR
- Publication: 1988
- Genres: Superhero RPG
- Systems: Marvel Super Heroes

Cosmos Cubed is a role-playing game adventure published by TSR in 1988 for the Marvel Super Heroes role-playing game.

== Contents ==
Cosmos Cubed is a scenario for the Advanced rules: Thor, Firelord, Doctor Strange, and the Silver Surfer have been summoned by the Watcher. They must get hold of the new Cosmic Cube before it can fall into the hands of the Kree or the Skrulls. It includes statistics for the Inhumans and the Elders of the Universe.

== Publication history ==
In 1984, TSR acquired the license to publish a role-playing game based on characters from Marvel Comics. The result was the popular Marvel Super Heroes: The Heroic Role-Playing Game. This was followed two years later by an expanded Marvel Superheroes Advanced Game. TSR published many adventures for this edition, including the Elders of the Universe trilogy.

The first adventure in this series was ME1 Cosmos Cubed, written by Troy Denning, with a cover by Jeff Butler, and published by TSR in 1988 as a boxed set that included a 32-page book describing the adventure, a 16-page resource book, a large color map, and an outer folder.

The series was completed by Ragnarok and Roll and The Left Hand of Eternity, both published in 1988.

== Reception ==
Writing in The Complete Guide to Role-Playing Games, Rick Swan called the Marvel Super Heroes game "a smooth introduction to role-playing for fans of the comics, and as such it's an qualified success." Swan went on to highly recommend Cosmos Cubed and the other adventures in the Elders of the Universe series, calling the trilogy "an excellent outer space campaign starring the Watcher, Galactus and other high-powered characters."
