= Deluxe City Campaign Set =

- Cover
- Publishers: TSR
- Systems: Marvel Super Heroes

Deluxe City Campaign Set is a role-playing game supplement published by TSR in 1989 for the Marvel Super Heroes role-playing game.

== Contents ==
Deluxe City Campaign Set is a campaign setting that describes the New York of the Marvel Universe in great detail. One book (96 pages) covers what the GM needs to know to run a campaign based in New York City; the second book (64 pages) contains several scenarios set in New York City.

In reference to real life, the Guardian Angels have an entry in this campaign setting.

== Publication history ==
In 1984, TSR acquired the license to publish a role-playing game based on characters from Marvel Comics. The result was the very popular Marvel Super Heroes: The Heroic Role-Playing Game. This was followed two years later by a greatly expanded Marvel Superheroes Advanced Game. TSR published many supplements for this game, including Deluxe City Campaign Set. This was published by TSR in 1989 as a boxed set containing a 96-page book, a 64-page book, and four large color maps.

== Reception ==
Writing in The Complete Guide to Role-Playing Games, Rick Swan noted that this product "provides all the maps, encounters, and staging tips necessary for the putting together an extended campaign set in New York City." Swan went on to call this "one of the best treatments of a contemporary setting ever published."

In Issue 49 of Casus Belli, Frederic Blayo highlighted Deluxe City Campaign Set as "a box that describes the most important city in the universe: New York!"
