= Children of the Atom (supplement) =

1986 role-playing game supplement

- Cover
- Publishers: TSR
- Systems: Marvel Super Heroes

Children of the Atom is a supplement published by TSR in 1986 for the Advanced Set of the Marvel Super Heroes role-playing game. It was written by Kim Eastland.

== Contents ==
Children of the Atom is a supplement for the Advanced Set describing all of Marvel Comics's mutant heroes and villains. Children of the Atom is an encyclopedia of mutant-kind, detailing their friends, enemies, homes, and equipment. It includes a miniscenario, "Dreamchild."

== Publication history ==
MA1 Children of the Atom was written by Kim Eastland and was published by TSR, Inc., in 1986 as a 96-page book with an outer folder.

== Reception ==
Pete Tamlyn reviewed Children of the Atom for White Dwarf #84. He described the product as:

Project Wideawake re-done for MSH Advanced, though it is vastly more comprehensive. Nevertheless, as is the way with such things, it is already way out of date, Chris Claremont having sabotaged it by introducing wholesale changes in the X-Men comic whilst the book was in production. Nor is it fully comprehensive, no Power Pack, for example. There is an adventure at the end, but it's not very impressive. If you look at it as an MSH Monster Manual, you'll get the basic idea. X-Men fans and students of the Marvel Universe will love it; others may find it a complete waste of time, especially as original statistics have already been published for most of the characters listed.
