= Avengers Coast-to-Coast =

Role-playing game supplement

- Cover
- Publishers: TSR
- Systems: Marvel Super Heroes

Avengers Coast-to-Coast is a role-playing game supplement published by TSR in 1986 for the Marvel Super Heroes role-playing game.

== Contents ==
Avengers Coast-to-Coast is a supplement for the Advanced Set describing all the various members of the superhero group the Avengers, with illustrations, maps, and a scenario, "Avengers Franchised."

Avengers Coast to Coast is a sourcebook intended for players to use characters from the Avengers. It has sections which detail the Avengers' Charter and focus on the group's relationship with the United States government. Also included are detailed plans of the bases the Avengers use, their transport and equipment, and descriptions of characters from Marvel Comics. The plot of the included adventure is that the Avengers have invited other heroes to apply for membership in their franchise operations, allowing the player characters the chance to join.

== Publication history ==
MA2 Avengers Coast-to-Coast was written by Edward G. Sollers and David Cook, with a cover by Jeff Butler, and was published by TSR, Inc., in 1986 as a 96-page book.

== Reception ==
Pete Tamlyn reviewed Avengers Coast-to-Coast for White Dwarf #88. He comments: "As expected, TSR have taken the arrival of Advanced Marvel Super Heroes as a reason to issue new game statistics for the vast number of Marvel characters in the original rules. About the only thing that can be said in their favour is that they've done a much better job of it second time around." He called the sections on the Avengers' Charter and their relationship with the government "the most interesting parts of the book" and noted that they help "provide the basis for starting an Advanced MSH campaign based around a superhero group. However, it comprises only about half the book. The rest of it is taken up with vast numbers of descriptions of Marvel characters, many of whom have already been described in at least one of the various original Marvel Super Heroes products."
