= Cat's paw =

Cat's paw or Catspaw may refer to:

- "Cat's paw", an idiom, meaning "the dupe (or unwitting tool) of another", derived from Jean de La Fontaine's fable "The Monkey and the Cat"
- Cat's paw theory, a legal doctrine derived from the fable

== Arts and entertainment ==
- Catspaw (rock opera), a 1974 Australian rock musical written by Dorothy Hewett
- Catspaw (TV series), a 1978 Australian series
- "Catspaw" (Star Trek: The Original Series), a television episode
- The Cat's-Paw, a 1934 film with Harold Lloyd
- Cat's Paw (1959 film), a Looney Tunes cartoon
- Catspaw (comics), April Dumaka, a superhero character in DC Comics
- Cat's Paw (adventure), for the role-playing game Marvel Super Heroes
- Cat's Paw, an American play by william Mastrosimone
- Catspaw, a 1988 science fiction novel by Joan D. Vinge
- Catspaw, a 2021 album by Matthew Sweet
- "Cat’s Paw", a 1971 episode of Mission: Impossible
- Cat's Paw Palace, a theater cofounded by Margaret Fisher in 1973

== Nature ==
- Cat's Paw Mussel, one of a few species of Epioblasma mussels
- Cat's paw coral, one of a few genera of coral
- Catspaw, informal name of some species of the plant Anigozanthus (Haemodoraceae)
- Cat's Paw Nebula or Bear Claw Nebula, common names for NGC 6334
- Cat's paw (wave), in Earth sciences, a pattern of shallow ripples (capillary waves) on the surface of water

== Technology ==
- Cat's paw (knot), a knot used for connecting a rope to an object
- Cat's paw (tool), a hand tool for extracting nails
- Cat's Paw (brand), a brand that produced patented slip-resistant rubber heels
- Cat's paw, a type of independent-jaw chuck

== See also ==
- Maneki-neko, Japanese good luck figurine seen waving its paw
