= The Revenge of Kang =

Role-playing game supplement

- Cover
- Publishers: TSR
- Systems: Marvel Super Heroes

The Revenge of Kang is a role-playing game adventure published by TSR in 1989 for the Marvel Super Heroes role-playing game.

== Contents ==
The Revenge of Kang is an adventure scenario intended for the rules in the Marvel Super Heroes Advanced Set, in which Kang the Conqueror plans to go back to the past to battle superheroes in the 1960s.

== Publication history ==
MT3 The Revenge of Kang was written by Ray Winninger, with a cover by Jeff Butler, and was published by TSR, Inc., in 1989 as a 48-page book and an outer folder.

== Reception ==
Games International magazine reviewed The Revenge of Kang and stated that "The Revenge of Kang sports the most absurd plot rationale in the history of module design. More time travel silliness provides the excuse for a succession of set pieces in which player characters either make skill rolls, fight villains or (exceptionally) use their noddles. Required for those who have played the first two, if only to rid your game of all this tosh, but not worth a look in otherwise."
