= Realms of Magic =

Role-playing game supplement

- Cover
- Publishers: TSR
- Systems: Marvel Super Heroes

Realms of Magic is a role-playing game supplement published by TSR in 1986 for the Marvel Super Heroes role-playing game.

== Contents ==
Realms of Magic is a supplement describing a magic system for the Basic game rules, with numerous demons, dimensions, magic items and spells, and 16 magical heroes and villains.

Realms of Magic includes a pair of gamemaster's screens, one of which doubles as the cover, while the other is double-sided with the game's Universal Table on one side, three books with a total of 96 pages between them, and artwork from Marvel throughout. Book 1 shows what spells are available to characters, and explains how the spells are cast what effects they have. It also presents a new character generation system specifically for magic-using characters. Book 2 contains background information and details the magical realms of the Marvel Universe, as well as some of the powerful magical entities found there, and information on things such as cults and magic items. Book 3 details magic-using characters such as Doctor Strange and Baron Mordo and various magical creatures, and includes some characters whose game statistics have been altered using the new rules such as Doctor Doom and Magik.

== Publication history ==
MHAC9 Realms of Magic was written by Kim Eastland, with a cover by Marshall Rogers and Terry Austin, and was published by TSR, Inc., in 1986 as two 40-page books, a 16-page book, and two outer folders.

== Reception ==
Pete Tamlyn reviewed Realms of Magic for White Dwarf #80. He declared: "For those of us, like myself [...] who are great fans of Dr. Strange it is most welcome." He added, "In the original game, magic was glossed over, but then so was everything else bar combat [...] I quite liked the simplicity of the original. But those who need full rules, or in the case of MSH full background, Realms of Magic is very good". His main complaint was one of style: "After the refreshingly simple and elegant game systems in MSH, Realms marks a return to the bad old AD&D style of masses of tables and long lists of specific spells. Also TSR are the unfortunate victims of the state of utter chaos that the Marvel magical universe has got into. It Realms seems confusing to you, don't blame Kim Eastland, blame twenty years of comic writers each going their own way. Having said that, if you are a comic fan and want to try to make sense of Marvel magic there is no better reference work than Realms."

== Reviews ==
- GameMaster Publications #4 (Jun 1986)
