= Marvel Universe (disambiguation) =

The Marvel Universe is the fictional universe that serves as a setting for Marvel Comics stories.

Marvel Universe may also refer to:

- Marvel Universe Online, an online RPG based on the Marvel Universe
- Marvel Universe Roleplaying Game, a role-playing game based on the Marvel Universe
- Marvel Action Universe, an animated series featuring Marvel characters
- Marvel Universe (toyline), an action figure line produced by Hasbro
- Marvel Universe (TV), a block on Disney XD that features Marvel animated series
- Marvel Cinematic Universe, an American media franchise and shared universe that is centered on a series of superhero films produced by Marvel Studios
- Sony Pictures Universe of Marvel Characters, an American media franchise and shared universe centered on a series of superhero films produced by Columbia Pictures in association with Marvel Entertainment and distributed by Sony Pictures Releasing

== See also ==
- The Official Handbook of the Marvel Universe, a comic-book-format encyclopedia of Marvel Comics characters
