= Adventure Fold-Up Figures =

- Cover
- Publishers: TSR
- Systems: Marvel Super Heroes

Adventure Fold-Up Figures is a role-playing game supplement published by TSR in 1984 for the Marvel Super Heroes role-playing game.

== Contents ==
Adventure Fold-Up Figures is a supplement consisting of over 125 color cardstock miniatures of heroes and villains to be cut apart and assembled. Adventure Fold-Up Figures are cardboard miniatures for roleplaying games, and each three-panel figure has an images of the character in question on each side, and the miniature is taped or glued to form a triangular prism-shaped figure. Characters represented include members of the X-Men, Avengers, Fantastic Four, Alpha Flight, and New Defenders, along with other major heroes like Spider-Man, Dr. Strange, Daredevil, and Moon Knight, and some supporting characters and villains.

== Publication history ==
MHAC3 Adventure Fold-Up Figures was written by Jeff Butler and Bruce Nesmith, and was published by TSR, Inc., in 1984 as 16 cardstock pages.

== Reception ==
Russell Grant Collins reviewed Marvel Super Heroes Adventure Fold-Up Figures in The Space Gamer No. 75. He felt that "If you play a Marvel comics campaign (in any system) this set is worth buying" but commented that "It's rather hard to establish the point in Marvel history that these characters are taken from, because certain characters are shown in their pre-Secret Wars costumes [...] and others aren't". Collins concluded the review by stating "I'm afraid that it comes down to price; do you want to pay six dollars for a lot of cardboard figures, including a number of questionable values [...] All in all, a mixed value for most of us."

== Reviews ==
- Game News #6 (Aug., 1985)
