= Gamer's Handbook of the Marvel Universe =

Role-playing game supplement book series

The Gamer's Handbook of the Marvel Universe is a series of role-playing game supplements published by TSR, beginning in 1988, for the Marvel Super Heroes role-playing game.

== Contents ==
The Gamer's Handbook of the Marvel Universe is a series of sourcebooks for the Marvel Super Heroes Advanced Set game, initially consisting of four handbooks. Each character is described on a double-sided page, with a full-color illustration for all major heroes and villains. The sheets are three-hole punched so that they can be stored in either a three-ring or two-ring binder.

The first four volumes of the Gamer's Handbook of the Marvel Universe are supplements for the Advanced rules of heroes and villains, each full described and color-illustrated on a separate hole-punched sheet, alphabetical. Volume one features Abomination through Dreadnought, volume two features Eel through Mad-Dog, volume three features Mad Thinker through Sentry, and volume four features Serpent Society through Zzzax. The next two volumes in the series were titled 1989 Character Updates and 1990 Character Updates.

== Publication history ==
The first four volumes of the Gamer's Handbook of the Marvel Universe were designed by David A. Martin, Chris Mortika, and Scott Bennie, and were published by TSR, Inc., in 1988 as 256-page five-hold punched books. The fifth volume was designed by Scott Bennie, David Martin, Chris Mortika, David Rogers, and William Tracy, and was published in 1989, and the sixth volume was designed by David Martin, Chris Mortika, Scott E. Davis, William Tracy, and Raymond Maddox, and was published in 1990; both featured covers by Jeff Butler and were the same size as the first four volumes.

== Bibliography ==
Original Series #1 - #8 (TSR, 1988 - 1992)
#	Info	ISBN	Year of Publ.	Pages	Sheets	Orig. Price
1	Abomination to Dreadnought	ISBN 0-88038-540-5	1988	256	128	$13.95
2	Eel to Mad Dog	ISBN 0-88038-576-6	1988	256	128	$13.95
3	Mad Thinker to Sentry	ISBN 0-88038-601-0	1988	256	128	$13.95
4	Serpent Society to Zzzax	ISBN 0-88038-617-7	1988	256	128	$13.95
5	1989 Characters Update	ISBN 0-88038-766-1	1989	256	128	$15.95
6	1990 Characters Update	ISBN 0-88038-866-8	1990	256	128	$15.95
7	1991 Characters Update	ISBN 1-56076-102-4	1991	128	64	$15.95
8	1992 Characters Update	ISBN 1-56076-407-4	1992	128	64	$15.95
9	1993 Characters Update	ISBN 1-56076-600-X	Publication canceled	128	64	$15.95

== Reception ==
Jim Bambra reviewed volumes 1-3 of the Gamer's Handbook of the Marvel Universe for Dragon magazine #145 (May 1989). Rolston called the books "exquisitely produced" and commented that "these handbooks are a godsend. Anyone who plays the Marvel Super Heroes Advanced Set game can't afford to be without these, as they form the ultimate in sourcebooks. 'Nuff said!"
