= New York, New York (supplement) =

Role-playing game supplement

- Cover art by Ron Frenz, Josef Rubinstein, and Jeff Butler
- Publishers: TSR
- Publication: 1985
- Systems: Marvel Super Heroes

New York, New York is a role-playing game supplement published by TSR in 1985 for the Marvel Super Heroes role-playing game.

== Contents ==
New York, New York contains two 16-page booklets. The first outlines forty scenarios set in New York City, subdivided into: everyday life, petty theft, theft, mass destruction, vendettas, organized crime, disasters and burglaries. The scenarios are inspired by the comic book adventures of Spider-Man and Daredevil.

The second booklet is a campaign setting briefly describing the New York City the Marvel super heroes inhabit.

== Publication history ==
After acquiring the license to produce a role-playing game based on the Marvel Comics universe, TSR first published Marvel Super Heroes in 1984, and followed with many adventures and supplements. One of those, published in 1985, was MHAC6 New York, New York, written by Kate Novak and Jeff Grubb, with a cover by Ron Frenz, Josef Rubinstein, and Jeff Butler as two 16-page books with two outer folders.
