= Judge's Screen =

- Publishers: TSR
- Systems: Marvel Super Heroes

Judge's Screen is a role-playing game supplement published by TSR in 1984 for the Marvel Super Heroes role-playing game.

== Contents ==
Judge's Screen is a GM's screen for the Basic rules, with a map and guide to Manhattan as depicted by Marvel Comics. The side for the gamemaster includes a selection of important tables, such as the 'universal' table for resolving the majority of game actions. The side for the players displays this same 'universal' table, along with a map of the Manhattan as seen in the Marvel universe. The package also includes an eight-page booklet to go along with the map, detailing the city and showing where both the major criminals and S.H.I.E.L.D. operate.

The outside of the screen is protected by enamel, and its map of Manhattan and Universal Table are presented in full color. The assorted tables on the inside of the screen for the gamemaster include items such as another Universal Table, random non-player characters, speeds, weapons and damage, and rank numbers. The booklet 'Hero's Guide to New York' provides a brief history of Manhattan, with some of its scenic features, and information on a selection of organizations found there.

== Publication history ==
MHAC1 Judge's Screen was written by Jeff Grubb, with a cover by Al Milgrom, and was published by TSR, Inc., in 1984 as a cardstock screen with an 8-page pamphlet.

== Reception ==
Craig Sheeley reviewed the Marvel Super Heroes Judge's Screen in The Space Gamer No. 71. He commented that "It seems that every game needs a GM's screen, and the one for the Marvel Super Heroes RPG is a pretty good one." He stated that "The 'Hero's Guide to New York' is almost more useful than the screen itself" and that it has "a very useful section on how to get around Manhattan if you don't fly, hop, swing, or teleport". Sheeley added: "The screen is typical, distinguished only by its outside protective covering. The real meat of this package is the Guide. It makes running a campaign in Marvel's New York possible, even if you've never been there." He continued: "The Marvel Super Heroes RPG has never had that many tables that require instant access during combat, and some of the tables on the screen were thrown in to take up space. Monetary resources are not likely to be important during combat, but the Resources table is there." Sheeley concluded his review by saying, "The Marvel Super Heroes Judge's Screen is a good deal, thanks to the Guide. The two will be of great value to a campaign."

Marcus L. Rowland reviewed Judge's Screen for White Dwarf #62, rating it 4/10 overall. He described it as "a fairly standard triple cardboard sheet". Rowland commented: "This pack doesn't add much to the game (the 'universal' table appears twice on the covers of the original rule books, for example), and will probably only appeal to completists."

== Reviews ==
- Game News #6 (Aug., 1985)
