= The Fantastic Four Compendium =

Tabletop Superhero role-playing game supplement

- Cover art by Jeff Butler
- Designers: David E. Martin
- Publishers: TSR
- Publication: 1987; 38 years ago
- Genres: Superhero
- ISBN: 978-0880384834

The Fantastic Four Compendium is a Superhero role-playing game supplement published by TSR in 1987 for the Marvel Super Heroes role-playing game.

== Contents ==
The Fantastic Four Compendium is a 96-page book that provides background material for a gamemaster interested in producing a campaign based on the Fantastic Four. The book is divided into six chapters:

1. All of the super heroes who have been a part of the Fantastic Four team.
2. All the friends and relatives of the group, both superheroes and normal people.
3. The various peoples and organizations that the Fantastic Four have encountered, particularly the Inhumans and the people of Atlantis.
4. The many enemies the group has made, including Doctor Doom, Galactus, the Mole Man, the Skrulls, and Annihilus.
5. Geographical locations such as the Baxter Building, as well as the many lands and regions they visited such as Wakanda and the Negative Zone.
6. Technical sheets for the team's vehicles.

== Publication history ==
After acquiring the license to produce a role-playing game based on the Marvel Comics universe, TSR first published Marvel Super Heroes in 1984, and followed with many adventures and supplements. One of these was MA4 The Fantastic Four Compendium, written by David E. Martin, with cover art by Jeff Butler and published in 1987.
