= Thunder Over Jotunheim =

1985 role-playing game adventure

- Cover
- Publishers: TSR
- Systems: Marvel Super Heroes

Thunder Over Jotunheim is a role-playing game adventure published by TSR in 1985 for the Marvel Super Heroes role-playing game.

== Plot summary ==
Thunder Over Jotunheim is a solo adventure scenario that makes use of the "Magic Viewer" system involving tinted lenses that reveal secret information to the player. Thor travels to the homeland of the giants, to stop the plans of Loki to take over Asgard.

Thunder Over Jotunheim is an adventure in which the player character is Thor, whose half-brother Loki has stolen the powerful sword of Frey to cause the downfall Asgard with the help of the storm giants. Thor searches for Loki and the stolen sword, from the Domain of the Rock Trolls to the Flaming Chasm to the Forest of Nightmare Plants, wielding his hammer Mjolnir and carrying a gift from the Norn queen sorceress Karnilla.

Thunder Over Jotunheim is a solo adventure pitting Thor against villains such as Loki, Geirrodur, Ulik, and the Executioner. It includes a fold-out map depicting the wilderness of Asgard with hammers on the map to depict area encounters, showing lines along which Thor is able to travel. Whenever entering one of these encounter spaces, the player turns to the appropriate text in the booklet to find out what occurs. The module features a system involving that uses red dots to hide secret paragraphs while the player places a tinted piece of plastic over the dots to see the text underneath. In the plot, Odin has disappeared and Thor must handle a crisis in Asgard where Loki has taken a magical sword that belongs to Frey. Thor is told that the sword protects Asgard from sudden attack by hordes of creatures such as Giants and Trolls, and the sword begin gone leaves Asgard very vulnerable. Karnilla gives Thor a gift of his choosing (from six available gifts) before he leaves to get the sword back.

== Publication history ==
MH6 Thunder Over Jotunheim was written by Bruce Nesmith, with a cover by Jeff Butler, and was published by TSR, Inc., in 1985 as a 16-page book, a large map, a viewer film, and an outer folder.

== Reception ==
Steve Crow reviewed Thunder Over Jotunheim in The Space Gamer No. 76. Crow comments that, "Thunder Over Jotunheim, the first solo module for Marvel Super Heroes, provides a convenient way for a player to use some of the non-group heroes such as Thor [...] heroes that are popular at Marvel but otherwise wouldn't get much module coverage. The module uses the various 'gifts of Karnilla' to generate a different location and differing clues for the sword of Frey each time. With the relatively simple combat rules of Marvel Super Heroes, the simple guidelines for combat with no supervising gamemaster works quite well. The random chart for different magical spells used by spellcasters could be used in other MSH modules to a similar purpose". He continues: "On the other hand, most of the encounters seem a little powerful for Thor to handle, due to his relatively low body armor. Upon leaving Asgard from one of two paths, Thor ends up in a battle where he is either almost certainly defeated, or leaves and forfeits all of his Karma. Several other battles are in a similar vein: no rules for fleeing a combat are provided, so the assumption is that once Thor is in a fight, he's in it to the finish. And finally, the map, which has paths going from one locale to the next, the distance between locales taking exactly one day to traverse, is really useless as an actual map. So if you intend to use this module as the beginning of the further adventures of Thor, the map is practically useless for that purpose." Crow concluded the review by saying, "Overall, Thunder Over Jotunheim is an adequate one-shot solitaire adventure, but its usefulness for a continuing campaign is almost nil. An interesting tidbit for avid Marvel Super Heroes players, of little or no use to players of other superhero RPGs."

Rob Nott reviewed Thunder Over Jotunheim for Imagine magazine. He describes the module as "a cross between an RPG and a board game, similar in style to the old SPI game John Carter of Mars". He calls the magic viewer system an improvement over TSR's prior "system of Magic Marker pens which entailed long periods of whacking away at obscured text to render it readable", making it "Quick, simple, and it allows others to use the module when you've finished." He noted that Karnilla providing Thor with six possible gifts "provides a variable element to the adventure" as "each of which can create a different story, so in theory one player can use the module six times before exhausting the possibilities". He continued: "There are lots of encounters, albeit rather simple ones, and plenty of opportunities for accumulating KARMA. I managed to get quite a nice stack of it before having to hit anything." Nott concluded by saying: "Overall, I found the module an interesting experiment with solo game design, though not really very challenging in a role-playing sense. If you enjoy solo games, though, I think you'll find this one of the better ones around."
