= Secret Wars II (adventure) =

Tabletop role-playing game adventure

- Cover
- Publishers: TSR
- Systems: Marvel Super Heroes

Secret Wars II is a role-playing game adventure published by TSR in 1986 for the Marvel Super Heroes role-playing game.

== Plot summary ==
Secret Wars II is a supplement which presents the plot and locations featured in the "Secret Wars II" series, including relevant game statistics for each of the superheroes and supervillains that were part of the storyline, as well as the Beyonder.

Secret Wars II is an adventure in which the Beyonder was originally his own universe until he learned about another universe which made him realize was not the only thing that existed, so he wants to discover other experiences. Secret Wars II contains a 32-page character book including the full cast of superheroes and supervillains who could potentially be part of the campaign as well as characters who had not appeared previously in the game, such as the New Mutants, Defenders, and Power Pack, and other characters such as Mephisto, Eternity, Death, and the Watcher. Also included is a 32-page campaign book outlining the plot, and a map that covers a section of New York City with some general purpose terrain maps on the back side.

== Publication history ==
MHSP2 Secret Wars II was written by Jeff Grubb, with a cover by John Byrne, and was published by TSR, Inc., in 1986 as two 32-page books, a large color map, and an outer folder.

== Reception ==
Pete Tamlyn reviewed Secret Wars II for White Dwarf #79. He comments on the plot, stating that as "there is an awful lot to it, nothing is covered in very much detail", and that "any average GM can probably write ten times better than Jim Shooter, so you may well be able to carry it off", and goes on to say: "The essence of the plot is that the heroes are faces with an enemy who can wipe out the world with a flick of his pinky, has the education of a 2-year old and wants to grow up. The heroes have to play mummy and daddy." Despite this, Tamly considers this adventure to be "an awful lot better than Secret Wars I. To start with, although there are potentially even more heroes involved, you don't have to play them all at once. Only at the end do the numbers get ridiculous. And there is quite a bit of plot to it, much of it the interesting psychological stuff. You can't out-fight The Beyonder, so you have to out-talk him. Your players should be utterly shell-shocked by the time they finish this." He complains, "as the SWII plot ran for almost a year and crossed over into almost every Marvel title, the chances of your having done this are not high. TSR have cut corners to keep the package down to a reasonable size, but not having character pictures for some of the new bad guys is a bit poor." Tamlyn concludes: "Because of its structure and basis in a particular comic story you have to be running an MSH campaign to use this. It is a must for MSG addicts because of the new characters and the map, though even they might find it too heavy to use. Anyone else, forget it."
