= Time Trap (adventure) =

- Cover
- Publishers: TSR
- Systems: Marvel Super Heroes

Time Trap is a role-playing game adventure published by TSR in 1984 for the Marvel Super Heroes role-playing game.

== Plot summary ==
Time Trap is an adventure scenario for the Avengers who will need to use time travel to prevent Earth from being destroyed, and will encounter enemies such as Dragon Man, the Grey Gargoyle, and the Super-Skrull. Time Trap is a seven chapter adventure in which six Avengers must stop the time-travelling Kang the Conqueror, who tries to trick them into altering their own past. Three chapters are encounters in the past intended to prevent the Avengers becoming a team at all, or at least keep them from surviving the events of their early history. The remainder of the encounters involve Kang directly where the Avengers can try to stop his plans.

Kang and his future incarnation Immortus take the Avengers through time to stop a mass nuclear meltdown. The Avengers will need to travel into the past to stop events that would cause the critical overload. They will need to fight Mimic, the Skrulls, Drax the Destroyer, and the Grey Gargoyle before going to the Omega Dimension to retrieve the only weapon that can stop Kang.

== Publication history ==
MH2 Time Trap was written by Bruce Nesmith, with a cover by John Byrne, and was published by TSR, Inc., in 1984 as a 16-page book, a large color map, and an outer folder. This scenario has 16 pages, and is packed with a cover folder containing character details and a double-sided 22"x17" map.

== Reception ==
Craig Sheeley reviewed the adventure in The Space Gamer No. 72. Regarding the plot, he said "Sound simple? It isn't: the foes are extremely tough (the Grey Gargoyle alone is a match for all six of the Avengers), the goals are difficult, and no matter how you try, the meddlings of Kang always seem to get worse! Can the world be saved?" Sheeley commented that "Time Trap will be welcomed by Avengers fans. The game stats and profiles of the current Avengers (Captains America and Marvel, Starfox, the Wasp, the Scarlet Witch, and their leader, the Vision) are valuable to those who didn't buy the TSR release Avengers Assembled. The large map is a real prize, too, adding a wilderness battleground to the game, as well as maps of the fortress in the Omega Dimension and the fabled Avengers' mansion! Most of all, gamemasters with players who are continually altering adventures through unforeseen actions will like Time Trap: It is so thoroughly laid out that there is practically nothing players can do to disrupt the adventure flow." He continued: "However, this iron control is the biggest problem in Time Trap. As in an earlier MSH release, Breeder Bombs, the players are led around by their noses. In Time Trap, they are teleported through time from place to place by the gamemaster, with no choice in the matter. The only thing they players can do is fight! A far cry from the adventure included in the Marvel Super Heroes game, where the heroes did a little detective work. I have yet to see a MSH adventure where the heroes get to do some thinking; TSR seems to have a problem with this. Another problem, in view of the section in the game on creating your own heroes, is that Time Trap (and Breeder Bombs) will not work well with any group but the Avengers; it is set up for the Avengers, to the exclusion of other possibilities (the X-Men from Breeder Bombs could not be substituted for the Avengers in Time Trap, nor would the Avengers work at all in Breeder Bombs). I doubt that even a different mix of Avengers would work well." Sheeley concluded the review by saying: "If the Avengers are among your favorite groups; if you want a scenario with lots of combat that doesn't require much thought, where nothing can go wrong, no matter what; if, after you think about the problems, you still like an evening of beer-and-pretzels gaming, then Time Trap is a good buy. After all, it is quite reasonably priced."

Marcus L. Rowland reviewed Time Trap for White Dwarf #62, rating it 6/10 overall. He commented that "Players and referees with extensive knowledge of the Aventers' history will have a considerable advantage in this adventure." Rowland reviewed the adventures The Breeder Bombs, Time Trap, and Murderworld! together, and declared that "All three adventures work reasonably well, but stress combat above role-play or campaign development. None give any opportunity for the characters to use their secret identities (an important feature of the game rules), all are extremely violent."

== Reviews ==
- Comics Feature #33
