= Ragnarok and Roll =

Marvel role-playing game adventure

- Cover art by Mike Machlan and Jeffrey Butler
- Designers: Troy Denning
- Publishers: TSR
- Publication: 1988
- Genres: Super hero RPG
- Systems: Marvel Super Heroes

Ragnarok and Roll is a role-playing game adventure published by TSR in 1988 for the Marvel Super Heroes role-playing game. The adventure was the second in a trilogy of high-level adventures titled the "Elders of the Universe" series.

== Contents ==
In the first adventure of the "Elders of the Universe" trilogy, Cosmos Cubed, the Elders of the Universe had used an immature Cosmos Cube to summon and then attempt to destroy Galactus. Although the destruction was unsuccessful, Galactus was divided into three beings and disappeared. In Ragnarok and Roll, a high-level adventure for the Marvel Super Heroes Advanced Set, Uatu the Watcher summons the mightiest heroes — the player characters — to discover what has happened to Galactus. At the same time, the heroes must prevent one part of the missing Galactus from sacking Asgard.

== Publication history ==
TSR acquired a role-playing game license from Marvel Comics, and produced Marvel Super Heroes in 1984, as well as dozens of supplements and adventures over the next five years. Three of those adventures were contained in the "Elders of the Universe" series, a 1988 trilogy of high-level outer space adventures with appearances by The Watcher and Galactus that included Cosmos Cubed, Ragnarok and Roll and The Left Hand of Eternity.

The second of those adventures, ME2 Ragnarok and Roll, was a 48-page book with large full-color map and outer folder written by Troy Denning, with cover art by Mike Machlan and Jeffrey Butler, interior art by John Statema and Mark A. Nelson, and cartography by Dave "Diesel" LaForce.

== Reception ==
In The Complete Guide to Role-Playing Games, Rick Swan recommended Ragnarok and Roll and the entire "Elders of the Universe" series as a good introduction to super hero role-playing games, calling all three adventures "an excellent outer space campaign setting."
