= Time Trap =

"The Time Trap" is the twelfth episode of the first season of the American animated science fiction television series Star Trek: The Animated Series

Time Trap may also refer to:

- Time Trap, a 1949 science fiction novel by Rog Phillips
- Time Trap, a 1970 science fiction novel by Keith Laumer
- Time Trap, a 1976 science fiction novel for children by Nicholas Fisk
- "Time Trap", a song by Built to Spill from their 1999 album Keep It Like a Secret
- "Time Trap!", a season 6 episode of The Loud House
- Time Trap (adventure), a role-playing game adventure published by TSR
- The Time Trap (1962 comic book), the ninth comic book in the Blake and Mortimer series
- The Time Trap (1999 comic book), a comic book in the Gambit series
- Time Trap (film), a 2017 American science fiction, action and adventure film
- Time Trap, the tenth and final book in the Bionicle Adventures series, published in 2005

== See also ==
- Timetrap, a Star Trek novel
