= All This and World War II (adventure) =

- Cover
- Publishers: TSR
- Systems: Marvel Super Heroes

All This and World War II is a role-playing game adventure published by TSR in 1989 for the Marvel Super Heroes role-playing game.

== Contents ==
All This and World War II is a scenario for the Advanced rules, first in a trilogy. An alien spaceship crash-lands in Nazi Germany, enabling Hitler and the Red Skull to use its advanced technology to send storm troopers up and down the time stream in search of secret weapons. The heroes discover one of these groups of foraging Nazis.

== Publication history ==
MT1 All This and World War II was written by Ray Winninger, and was published by TSR, Inc., in 1989 as a 48-page book and an outer folder.
