= Lone Wolves (adventure) =

Table-top role-playing game adventure

- Cover
- Publishers: TSR
- Systems: Marvel Super Heroes

Lone Wolves is a role-playing game adventure published by TSR in 1984 for the Marvel Super Heroes role-playing game.

== Plot summary ==
Lone Wolves is a scenario set in New York City, pitting Daredevil, the Black Widow, Power Man, and Iron Fist against Kraven, MODOK, Sabretooth, and maybe the Punisher.

Lone Wolves is an adventure in which Daredevil, the Heroes for Hire, and Black Widow face an assortment of supervillains in New York, which irritates the Kingpin of Crime and puts the client of the Heroes for Hire agency at risk.

== Publication history ==
MH4 Lone Wolves was written by Bruce Nesmith, and was published by TSR, Inc., in 1984 as a 16-page book, a large color map, and an outer folder.

== Reception ==
Pete Tamlyn reviewed Lone Wolves for Imagine magazine, and stated that "I really like this scenario. It has a lovely air of reality about it. Unlike the other scenarios so far produced, which are essentially Superhero versus Supervillain, this one is about Superheroes fighting time."

Marcus L. Rowland reviewed Lone Wolves for White Dwarf #69, rating it 6/10 overall. He commented that Lone Wolves was "apparently designed for just the opposite effect" compared to the Secret Wars adventure: "it isn't a mega-adventure, and the heroes won't save the world or the universe, but every episode crawls with chances to make contacts, learn more about the underworld, and perform feats of deduction and detection". Rowland concludes that the "exact motives for the odd series of crimes are fairly enigmatic and, even after re-reading the adventure twice, a little unconvincing. However, the slightly chaotic overall effect does reflect the fairly peculiar attitudes of supervillains. With a slightly tighter plot this would be an extremely enjoyable scenario; as it is, it can still be the basis for an excellent adventure, but the referee should consider altering a few details."
