= Kim Eastland =

American game designer (1952–2020)

- Born: February 26, 1952; Moline, Illinois, United States
- Died: January 29, 2020 (aged 67); Moline, Illinois, United States
- Resting place: Rosedale Cemetery (Cambridge, Illinois)
- Occupation: Game designer

Kimber "Kim" Lee Eastland (February 26, 1952 – January 29, 2020) was a game designer who worked for TSR.

== Early life ==
Kim Eastland was born in Moline, Illinois, one of two children of Everett and Margaret Eastland. He attended Alleman High School in nearby Rock Island, then earned a bachelor's degree from Augustana College in Rock Island, studying pre-med, English, and theater.

== Career ==
In 1981, at age 29, Eastland began working for the tabletop miniatures manufacturer Grenadier Models as their publicist and the editor of their new newsletter, The Grenadier Bulletin.

In 1983, he started working for TSR from his home in Moline, becoming the network coordinator of the RPGA, succeeding founder Frank Mentzer. He also became managing editor of the RPGA's newsletter, Polyhedron.

Eastland became a prolific author for TSR, writing role-playing game adventures for various product lines including Dungeons & Dragons, Conan Role-Playing Game, Gamma World, and Marvel Superheroes, as well as a rules supplement for Star Frontiers.

He also contributed multiple articles to TSR's games magazine Dragon, including several about Star Frontiers and Gamma World. Between February 1983 (Issue #70) and May 1984 (Issue #85), he wrote a regular column about new miniature lines by various companies titled Figure Feature.

During this time, Eastland also coordinated the miniature painting competition associated with Gen Con called the Gen Con Miniature Open.

In 1992, Eastland returned to Grenadier Models, again as publicist and editor of The Grenadier Bulletin.

== Other interests ==
For many years, Eastland was involved in the Playcrafters Barn Theater in Moline, where he performed, directed and was the office manager. Starting in 1997, he also performed with the improvisational comedy group "It's a Mystery", and wrote the interactive whodunit scripts for the group.

== Death ==
Kim Eastland died at age 67 of pancreatic cancer on January 29, 2020, at his home in Moline.

== Works ==
=== Conan Role-Playing Game ===
- Conan the Buccaneer (1985)
- Conan the Mercenary (1985)

=== Dungeons & Dragons ===
- The Minrothad Guilds (1988)

=== Gamma World ===
- GW6, Alpha Factor
- GW8, Gamma Base
- GW9, Delta Fragment
- GW10, Epsilon Cyborgs

=== Marvel Super Heroes ===
- Pit of the Viper (1984)
- Fault Line (1985)
- The Last Resort (1985)
- Children of the Atom (1986)
- Realms of Magic (1986)

=== Star Frontiers ===
- Zebulon's Guide to Frontier Space

=== Articles for Dragon ===
==== Star Frontiers ====
- "Freeze! Star Law!" (Issue 87)
- "The Might Mega-Corporations" (Issue 89)
- "The Might Mega-Corporations of the Frontier" (Issue 90)
- "Patriots, Terrorists and Spies" (Issue 109)

==== Marvel Superheroes ====
- "Return to the Viper's Pit" (Issue 98)

==== Gamma World ====
- "Mutations Unlimited" (Issue 131)
- "Up and Running in the Land of Mutants" (Issue 137)

==== Advanced Dungeons & Dragons ====
- "The Scout — a thief without the thieving" (Issue 161)

==== Miniatures ====
- "Gen Con Miniature Open Winners" (Issue 68, 79, 92, 93, 94)
- "The Scenery of SF" (Issue 93)
- "Figure Feature" (Issues 70, 72, 75, 76, 77, 78, 81, 84, 85)
