= After Midnight (adventure) =

Role-playing game adventure

- Cover art by Jeff Butler
- Designers: Anthony Herring
- Publishers: TSR
- Publication: January 1990
- Genres: Super hero
- Systems: Marvel Super Heroes

After Midnight is a licensed role-playing game adventure published by TSR in 1990 for the Marvel Super Heroes role-playing game, itself based on the Marvel Super Heroes line of comics. This adventure was the first installment of a trilogy.

== Description ==
After Midnight is the first part of the Gang Wars trilogy, which centers on a New York City gang war fomented by the Faces of Fear, a gang of supervillains somehow controlled by the mysterious "Big Boss".

The player character super heroes are called to the Metropolitan Museum of Art, where a tome titled A Mdman's Mutterings has been stolen. While the super heroes' investigation leads to confrontations with supernatural monsters, manifestations such as animated skeletons attack the city at night.

During their investigation, the superheroes assist Felicia Bifrost and her brother Johnny, a pair of mutants, who later appeared in TSR's 1992 release X-Forces: The Mutant Update.

The investigation leads to the underground lair of the Faces of Fear gang, where the super heroes find a hypnotizing machine used to control the supervillains, and face a boss fight with the lieutenant of the Big Boss.

== Publication history ==
In 1984, TSR gained the license to produce a role-playing game based on characters from Marvel Comics. The result was Marvel Super Heroes, which was followed by an "Advanced" version in 1986. Many supplements and adventures set in New York City were also published, including the Gang Wars Trilogy.

The first installment in the trilogy, MLA1 After Midnight, was written by Anthony Herring, with cover art by Jeff Butler and interior art by John Statema. It was published by TSR in 1990 as a 64-page book and a poster, both enclosed in a cardstock outer folder.

The other two installments in the trilogy, MLA2 Night Moves and MLA3 Night Life were released at the same time.
