= Murderworld =

Murderworld may refer to:

- Murderworld, a series of fictional theme-parks in Marvel comics run by the character Arcade
- Murderworld!, a role-playing game adventure for the Marvel Super Heroes role-playing game
- "Murderworld", a song on the White Zombie album Make Them Die Slowly
