= The Left Hand of Eternity =

1988 superhero RPG adventure

- Cover art by Mike Machlan and Lori Svikel
- Publishers: TSR
- Systems: Marvel Super Heroes

The Left Hand of Eternity is a role-playing game adventure published by TSR in 1988 for the Marvel Super Heroes role-playing game. It is the final installment in the "Elders of the Universe" trilogy.

== Contents ==
The Left Hand of Eternity is a scenario for the Advanced rules that acts as a sequel to Cosmos Cubed and Ragnarok and Roll.

In Cosmos Cubed, the Elders of the Universe used an immature Cosmos Cube to summon and then attempt to destroy Galactus. This only succeeded in splitting Galactus into three beings. In Raganarok and Roll, the superheroes attempted to find all three parts of Galactus.

Now in the final chapter, the superheroes must prevent the death of Galactus, since his energy will be used by the gods of death to change the face of the universe forever.

== Publication history ==
After acquiring the license to produce a role-playing game based on the Marvel Comics universe, TSR first published Marvel Super Heroes in 1984, and followed with many adventures. One of these was ME3 The Left Hand of Eternity, written by Ray Winninger, and was published by TSR in 1988 as a 48-page book with an outer folder. The cover art was by Mike Machlan and Lori Svikel, with interior art by Angel Medina and cartography by David S. LaForce.
