= Project Wideawake (supplement) =

Project: Wideawake
- Cover
- Publishers: TSR
- Systems: Marvel Super Heroes

Project: Wideawake is a role-playing game supplement published by TSR in 1985 for the Marvel Super Heroes role-playing game.

== Contents ==
Project: Wideawake is a supplement which details the major mutant characters of the Marvel Universe, each with an illustration. This supplement provides game statistics for all the principal mutant character, as well as many of their associates. The booklet spend 32 pages describing members of the X-Men and New Mutants and also their main enemies such as the Hellfire Club, the Brotherhood of Evil Mutants and the Morlocks. It also includes plans of Professor Xavier's estate and his mansion.

== Publication history ==
MHAC5 Project: Wideawake was written by Jeff Grubb, with a cover by Kerry Gammill, and was published by TSR, Inc., in 1985 as a 32-page book.

== Reception ==
Pete Tamlyn reviewed the supplement in Imagine magazine. He comments, "OK, X-Fans, this is the one you've been waiting for [...] if you have any interest at all in the X-Men and related groups then this product is essential." He found that the floor plans "are not really clear enough for any serious use without considerable work on the GM's part." Tamlyn added: "The coverage of Marvel mutant-kind is reasonably comprehensive. Quicksilver and Scarlet Witch have been left out as they were in the Avengers booklet; Beast was as well, of course, but they could hardly miss one of the original X-Men. Phoenix is in and, as might have been expected, is tough enough to take on everyone else in the booklet put together and win easily—the booklet sensibly recommends that she only enter games as an NPC. There are, however, some surprising omissions, including the Starjammers, Shi'Ar Imperial Guard and Alpha Flight. There are not many mutants in that lot, but they're all part of the X-Men circle. Another book, perhaps?" He continued, "I have got a few gripes as well. One or two boobs seem to have slipped past the proofreaders; for example we are told that Magma regains health points each round as long as she is in contact with the ground, but we are not told how many points per round. However, if you want to run MSH as it is designed to be run, some things are essential, and this is one of them." Tamlyn concludes the review by saying, "Final point: the booklet introduces a new rule to MSH. Supervillains now have negative popularity which is a measure of how easy they find it to cow hapless civilians. A nice idea."

== Reviews ==
- The VIP of Gaming #3 (Apr 1986)
- Comics Feature #38
