= Cat's Paw (adventure) =

- Cover
- Publishers: TSR
- Systems: Marvel Super Heroes

Cat's Paw is a role-playing game adventure published by TSR in 1984 for the Marvel Super Heroes role-playing game.

== Plot summary ==
Cat's Paw is a scenario set in Canada featuring Alpha Flight battling the Leader and his minions.

Cat's-Paw consists of a sixteen-page adventure, and includes character cards for the members of Alpha Flight, a large map sheet, and game statistics for the heroes inside the covers. The player characters must stop an attempt to sabotage the hydroelectric James Bay Project.

Jeff Grubb explains in a paragraph in the introduction to Cat's Paw that other characters can be substituted for Alpha Flight.

== Publication history ==
MH5 Cat's Paw was written by Jeff Grubb, with a cover by John Byrne and illustrations by Jeff Butler, and was published by TSR, Inc., in 1984 as a 16-page book, a large color map, and an outer folder.

== Reception ==
Marcus L. Rowland reviewed Cat's Paw for White Dwarf #69, rating it 6/10 overall. He jokingly notes that any resemblance between the Cthulhu Mythos and the monster manipulating the supervillains "is, of course, purely coincidental". Rowland concludes by saying: "This is probably my favourite adventure for this game to date, since it's a lot more coherent than most previous offerings and seems to have written with significant traces of humour."

Pete Tamlyn reviewed Cat's Paw for Imagine magazine. He noted that he was able to use characters other than Alpha Flight: "with very little modification of the plot I managed to run the scenario for the Fantastic Four instead. I missed out on a little bit of the significance of the final encounter because the enemy in question was very closely related to Alpha Flight's characters, but other than that, no problem." Tamlyn continued by saying that "the production is up to the usual high standard with the useful addition of little cut-out character information cards for the players. The plot is somewhat variable. There is a reasonable amount of political interest to relieve the monotony of the slugfests, and also some nice atmospheric touches, although these are somewhat spoilt by the 'read this to players' boxes which contain the sort of purple prose that will have the players cringing rather than entranced. However, there are a places where plot continuity seems to rely rather too heavily on players doing what the author expected. The ending is rather tough and needs very careful handling by the GM. All in all, slightly above average for MSH, but not their best."

== Reviews ==
- Game News #8 (Oct. 1985)
- The V.I.P. of Gaming Magazine #3 (April/May 1986)
