= Pit of the Viper =

Role playing game supplement

Adventure Fold-Up Figures Featuring Pit of the Viper
- Cover
- Publishers: TSR
- Systems: Marvel Super Heroes

Adventure Fold-Up Figures Featuring Pit of the Viper is a role-playing game supplement published by TSR in 1984 for the Marvel Super Heroes role-playing game.

== Contents ==
Adventure Fold-Up Figures Featuring Pit of the Viper is a supplement of over 70 color cut-apart cardstock miniatures, plus a miniscenario in which the heroes must infiltrate the headquarters of the Nihilists to stop a sinister plot hatched by the Viper.

== Publication history ==
MHAC4 Adventure Fold-Up Figures Featuring Pit of the Viper was written by Kim Eastland, and was published by TSR, Inc., in 1984 as a 4-page pamphlet with four cardstock folders.

== Reception ==
Pete Tamlyn reviewed Pit of the Viper for Imagine magazine. He comments that "Pit of the Viper is a very schizophrenic product. One the one hand, the packaging, trademark, etc. suggests that it is targeted at a very young market; on the other, there is an MSH module there too and one which, unlike the usual fare, expects the GM to do a lot of work. Pit of the Viper only provides the setting and a few plot ideas and this suggests a requirement for a much more sophisticated user than the standard modules. Fortunately, it works fairly well on both levels. Very young kids, once someone has assembled the figures for them, will probably be happy to play away and ignore the scenario. For those of us who want to role-play the cardboard figured make very useful play-aids." Tamlyn continued: "The basic set-up is an underground lair used by Viper and her terrorist cronies, the Nihilists. Leaving aside Kim Eastland's total ignorance of Nihilism which must have poor Nietzsche turning in his grave, the scenario provides an interesting challenge for the more streetwise, pugilist type of superhero (Daredevil or Cap for example), there being no super-powered villains involved. However, much of the scenery provided is directly useful in almost any scenario. Having a blank floorplan on which you position wall units to make rooms makes the set-up very flexible. All the figures are very nicely produced and far outshine the character counter provided with the basic game."
