= Avengers Assembled! =

1984 role-playing game supplement

- Cover
- Publishers: TSR
- Systems: Marvel Super Heroes

Avengers Assembled! is a role-playing game supplement published by TSR in 1984 for the Marvel Super Heroes role-playing game.

== Contents ==
Avengers Assembled! is a supplement presenting game statistics for 30 characters that have been members of the Avengers team, as well as 22 of their enemies, the Avengers Mansion, and the organization S.H.I.E.L.D. Avengers Assembled is a 32-page book, with a removal cover that has a detailed map printed on it of the Avengers' mansion. The supplement explores the mansion, S.H.I.E.L.D., and Nick Fury, 30 team members (two of these characters have additional secret identities, meaning there are actually 26 separate characters), and two Avengers associates. Each character has an illustration, as are some S.H.I.E.L.D. equipment and personnel.

Avengers Assembled! includes statistics for all members of the Avengers up until that time, plus many of their regular allies and enemies, including Kang the Conqueror, Ultron, and S.H.I.E.L.D., plans for the Avengers Mansion, and artwork from Marvel artists. Avengers Assembled! provides game statistics for past and present Avengers members including Black Panther, Falcon, Hawkeye, Scarlet Witch, Hulk, and She-Hulk. The book presents a map and key of the Avengers Mansion and information on the S.H.I.E.L.D. Flying Car, their headquarters, and jet fighters. Each superhero and supervillain has a description including the name they go by, their status at the time (including dead or inactive), real name identity, game statistics, equipment and possessions, important characters in their life, background information and personality, as well as an illustration.

== Publication history ==
MHAC2 Avengers Assembled! was written by Bruce Nesmith, with a cover by Jeff Butler, and was published by TSR, Inc., in 1984 as a 32-page book with an outer folder. Avengers Assembled was TSR's first expansion for Marvel Super Heroes.

== Reception ==
Marcus L. Rowland reviewed Avengers Assembled! for White Dwarf #62, rating it 8/10 overall. He declared: "This is an invaluable reference for any MSH referee, and may appeal to many comic collectors and fans."

Pete Tamlyn reviewed Avengers Assembled! for Imagine magazine. He opined that "Avengers Assembled! will be an essential product for most players of the game". He stated: "Personal preferences aside, the Avengers are probably the ideal group to choose if you are going to run an extended campaign using MSH. There have been so many members and roster changes that your players are almost certain to be able to pick a character each without conflict over who plays which particular favourite, or someone getting lumbered with a character that doesn't suit their style of play." He continued: "There are a few grossly powerful characters among them, and I'd recommend that Thor in particular be kept as an NPC who can rescue the players in times of dire emergency, but the only real wimps, Wasp and Hawkeye, are among the most interesting characters to play. My only complaint is that many of the villains are also very tough, the sort of folks who take on the Avengers single-handed and are normally only defeated thanks to their arrogance and over-confidence, and will therefore be quite difficult for the GM to handle." Tamlyn concluded by saying: "Overall, a much-needed publication which will sell very well."

William A. Barton reviewed the supplement in Space Gamer #70. Barton commented that the character descriptions give "all that any gamer familiar with the Marvel universe would need to portray the character in a game or the GM to use as an NPC". He stated: "This supplement is surprisingly complete in terms of heroes and villains covered, and should be most welcome to Marvel fans who wish to portray Avengers" and that the map of Avengers Mansion "would be of use even to players who wish to create their own 'Avengers'". He commented: "One flay evident in Avengers Assembled is that the length of some of the power write-ups requires the dropping of the background notes on the character – okay for old-time Marvel fans, but a potential problem for newcomers. This makes possession of the 15 Marvel Universe comics a necessity for those without an encyclopedic knowledge of the Marvel universe – something that really should have been avoided". Barton concluded his review by saying, "Overall though, for those interested in superheroic gaming in the worlds of Marvel Comics, Avengers Assembled is a worthy addition to the original game."

== Reviews ==
- Comics Feature #33
