= The Breeder Bombs =

Role-playing game adventure

- Cover
- Publishers: TSR
- Systems: Marvel Super Heroes

The Breeder Bombs is a role-playing game adventure published by TSR in 1984 for the Marvel Super Heroes role-playing game.

== Plot summary ==
The Breeder Bombs is an adventure scenario in which the X-Men must stop Magneto by finding and deactivating his four dirty radioactive bombs. Magneto is assisted by other super-villains who attack the X-Men at locations in the United States, USSR, Australia, and Chile. The players use the X-Men members as player characters, who are attacked in their headquarters. The adventure unfolds over seven chapters in which the characters search for the "breeder" bombs which have been designed to increase worldwide radiation levels and therefore result in millions of new mutations.

== Publication history ==
MH1 The Breeder Bombs was written by Jeff Grubb, and was published by TSR, Inc., in 1984 as a 16-page book, a large color map, and an outer folder. This scenario has 16 pages, and is packed with a cover folder containing character details and a double-sided 22"x17" map.

== Reception ==
Craig Sheeley reviewed the adventure in Space Gamer #70. Sheeley felt that "Breeder Bombs should please any X-Men fan: it features plenty of slugfests, lots of chances to display the X-Men's prowess, and a lineup of some major Marvel villains, including the justly-feared Sentinel robots." He called the maps "well-made" and noted that the Danger Room level of the X-Mansion was "a welcome addition to the amp in the original game". He commented that "TSR made one major mistake with the adventure: They forgot to include counters for the X-Men and their foes in the game set. The counters are a must for the map movement and add greatly to the game, and the only counter available is the Wolverine counter from the basic game." Seeley concluded his review by saying, "Breeder Bombs is a pretty expensive adventure to come without counters, and kind of simple at that: the characters are more led around by their noses than by any merit of their own. Still, if what you want is plenty of combat, Breeder Bombs is your baby."

Marcus L. Rowland reviewed The Breeder Bombs for White Dwarf #62, rating it 7/10 overall. He stated: "There are several tricks and twists, which lead to an amusing and apocalyptic conclusion." Reviewing the adventures The Breeder Bombs, Time Trap, and Murderworld! together, Rowland declared that "All three adventures work reasonably well, but stress combat above role-play or campaign development. None give any opportunity for the characters to use their secret identities (an important feature of the game rules), all are extremely violent."

Larry DiTillio reviewed The Breeder Bombs for Different Worlds magazine and stated that "At its price The Breeder Bombs is a good buy and if you're into Marvel Super Heroes and like the X-Men (is there anyone who doesn't?) you should enjoy it."

== Reviews ==
- Game News #8 (Oct. 1985)
- Comics Feature #33
