= Gates of What If? =

Role-playing game adventure

- Artwork by Jeffrey Butler
- Publishers: TSR
- Systems: Marvel Super Heroes

Gates of What If? is an adventure published by TSR in 1986 for the superhero role-playing game Marvel Super Heroes.

== Description ==
=== Setting ===
The superheroes travel through a portal to a parallel world where many things are different, especially the superheroes' alter egos in the parallel world. As Guide du Rôliste Galactique notes, "Much of the interest of the adventure comes from the confrontation between these characters and those of the parallel world. Some [of the superheroes in this parallel world] are dead, others have never been superheroes, or their costume is being used by someone else. The reactions of the public and the heroes of the parallel world therefore risk unsettling the characters."

=== Plot ===
In the parallel world, Doctor Doom is considered a hero, and he uses the superheroes to attempt to gain his revenge against Mephisto. A color map of Doom's lair, Doomstadt, is included.

=== Player characters ===
The players can choose from a variety of pregenerated player character superheroes:

- From the Fantastic Four: Mister Fantastic, Invisible Woman, She-Hulk, The Thing, Human Torch
- From the Avengers: Wasp, Sub-Mariner, Captain America
- Spider-Man

== Publication history ==
In 1984, TSR acquired the license to produce a role-playing game based on the superheroes of Marvel Comics. The result was Marvel Super Heroes. TSR also produced a line of adventures for the game. The ninth module, published in 1986, was MH9 Gates of What If?, a 40-page saddle-stapled softcover book written by Roger E. Moore, with interior art by Jeffrey Butler and the Marvel Comics staff, and cover art by Butler.

== Reception ==
In Issue 4 of Adventurer, Ian Marsh called Gates of What-If? "a titanic adventure for Marvel Super Heroes which pits the Fantastic Four and Spidey against a formidable extra-dimensional opponent. Would you be surprised if Doctor Doom appeared too? Nope, nor would I."
