= Fault Line (adventure) =

Role-playing game adventure

- Cover
- Publishers: TSR
- Systems: Marvel Super Heroes

Fault Line is a role-playing game adventure published by TSR in 1985 for the Marvel Super Heroes role-playing game.

== Contents ==
Fault Line is a scenario in which Spider-Man, Captain America, the Wasp, and the Black Knight have a limited amount of time to save New York City from being destroyed by an earthquake.

== Publication history ==
MH8 Fault Line was written by Kim Eastland, and was published by TSR, Inc., in 1985 as a 16-page book, a large color map, and an outer folder.

== Reviews ==
"Fault Line" by Kim Eastman ranks as one of the best modules for TSR's classic Marvel Super Heroes RPG. Featuring Spiderman and three Avengers (Captain America, Wasp and Black Knight), the game pits the heroes up against a mastermind (pun fully intended) and the stakes are high. The module is far less structured than most relying on a series of incidents and a timetable so GMs who aren't flexible might have problems with it. But there's far more to the module. It includes a map which connects with the one included in the box set and detailed descriptions of the stores included on it. There are also plenty of stand-up cardboard figures of heroes, villains and NPCs as well. A must have for anyone playing the old TSR game after more than three decades.

— Kevin M. Derby
