= Super Hero Players Package =

Super Hero Players Package is a 1989 role-playing game supplement published by Sage Lore Productions for Marvel Super Heroes.

== Contents ==
Super Hero Players Package is a supplement in which serves as a player's aid, featuring 25 sheets that include character record sheets and vehicle forms. The package also contains an instruction sheet and pre-filled sample forms to guide players in setting up their characters and vehicles for gameplay.

== Publication history ==
Marvel Super Heroes Players Package was written by Bob L. Anderson, with a cover by Donald L. Anderson and published by Sage Lore Productions in 1989 as 25 sheets.
