= The Last Resort (adventure) =

1985 superhero RPG adventure

- Cover art by Ron Frenz
- Publishers: TSR
- Systems: Marvel Super Heroes

The Last Resort is a role-playing game adventure published by TSR in 1985 for the Marvel Super Heroes role-playing game.

== Plot summary ==
The Last Resort contains a scenario for four players, who take on the roles of the West Coast Avengers: Hawkeye, Mockingbird, Tigra and Wonder Man (although there are suggestions for how the gamemaster can adapt the adventure to other superheroes).

The four superheroes are planning to meet Iron Man in the Rocky Mountains for a weekend of rest, but when they arrive at the Boy Scout Jamboree where they were supposed to meet him, Iron Man is nowhere to be seen and hypnotized Boy Scouts attack them.

The superheroes must find Iron Man's kidnapper, dealing with Plantman, Blizzard, Pyro, Whirlwind, the Radioactive Man and finally the Mandarin.

== Publication history ==
After acquiring the license to produce a role-playing game based on the Marvel Comics universe, TSR first published Marvel Super Heroes in 1984, and followed with many adventures. One of them was MH7 The Last Resort, written by Kim Eastland, with a cover by Ron Frenz, published by TSR in 1985 as a 16-page book, with a large color map, and an outer folder.

== Reception ==
In Issue 37 of Abyss, Dave Nalle called this "essentially a shooting gallery where [the characters] face a series of foes. Then they get to the 'Caverns of Chu', face The Mandarin and are, of course, victorious. This is dull, it follows an obvious formula ... This is sort of like a beauty show for minor Marvel heroes and villains, and any decent referee could have run this or an identical scenario without this module, without even writing himself any notes." Nalle concluded, "This sort of formulaic design is a problem in some AD&D modules, but when coupled with the sterility of Marvel Superheroes, the lack of originality in most of Marvel's universe and the triviality of the West Coast Avengers, it becomes a formula for a strong sleeping draught."
