= The Weird, Weird West =

Role-playing games supplement

- Cover
- Publishers: TSR
- Systems: Marvel Super Heroes

The Weird, Weird West is an adventure published by TSR in 1989 for the superhero role-playing game Marvel Super Heroes

== Contents ==
The heroes discover that time is breaking down, and famous personages from history such as Napoleon, Genghis Khan, Alexander the Great, and more, are all converging on 1871. The heroes must travel back in time to thwart an alien invasion and find the cause of the time warp.

== Publication history ==
MT2 The Weird, Weird West was the second Marvel Superheroes adventure in TSR's Time Warp series. The 64-page book with outer folder was written by Ray Winninger, with illustrations by Jeff Butler, Cory Graham, Paul Hanchette, and John Statema, and was published by TSR, Inc., in 1989.

== Reception ==
In the September–October 1989 edition of Games International (Issue #9), Mike Jarvis admitted that "I'm not greatly enamoured with this product. It's not that it is a bad scenario as such; merely that it isn't particularly original." Jarvis also found the adventure lacked a "superhero atmosphere", and the pre-generated characters provided were not a good fit for the adventure. Jarvis concluded by giving the adventure a poor rating of 2 out of 5, saying, "This is a lacklustre product [...] As a superhero adventure it didn't inspire me, and probably won't thrill your players either."
