= Marvel Super Heroes Adventure Game =

Super hero RPG game

- Cover of Marvel Super Heroes Adventure Game
- Publishers: TSR
- Publication: 1998
- Genres: Superheroes
- Systems: SAGA System

The Marvel Super Heroes Adventure Game is a role-playing game published by TSR, Inc. that uses the SAGA System and features characters published by Marvel Comics. It should not be confused with the earlier Marvel Super Heroes Game, also published by TSR, the later Marvel Universe Roleplaying Game, published by Marvel itself, or Marvel Heroic Roleplaying, published by Margaret Weis Productions.

== Publication history ==
Marvel Super Heroes Adventure Game was published on July 30, 1998. The game was based on the SAGA System, and publications for the game lasted into the year 2000.

== Contents ==
The game box contained a Fate Deck, roster book, and instruction manual.

=== Fate Deck ===
The Fate Deck was a deck of 96 cards used instead of dice in order to determine the outcome of actions and to help determine results. Each card contained a picture of a character, a Calling, an Aura (positive, neutral, or negative), and a Suit.

There were five Suits, each of which represented by a character. The Suits were:

- Strength Suit (color Green), represented by the Incredible Hulk
- Agility Suit (color Red), represented by Spider-Man
- Intellect Suit (color Blue), represented by Mister Fantastic
- Willpower Suit (color Purple), represented by Doctor Strange
- Doom Suit (color Black), represented by Doctor Doom

TSR issued four promotional cards separately at the launch of the game: Ghost Rider, Lockheed, Deadpool and The Impossible Man. These cards are quite rare today.

=== Roster Book ===
The roster book contained the game details and biographies of 31 Heroes and 19 Villains.

=== The Game Book ===
The game book was an instruction manual that guided players in how to play the game and create their own characters.

== Game rules ==
The game rules were designed for fast and simple play. Each character had 4 abilities, rated from 1 to 30. Normal human abilities ranked between 1 and 10; superhuman abilities, such as Thor's strength, ranged between 11 and 20; cosmic-level characters, such as Galactus, could have abilities between 21 and 30. Each character also had an Edge, ranked between 0 and 5, which was to represent their experience as a hero or villain. The character's Edge determined the player's Hand Size (2 plus the Edge value). Supporting characters and minions typically had an Edge of 0; Inexperienced characters, hero such as Jubilee of the X-Men, had an Edge of 1; Experienced heroes, such as Hawkeye, had an Edge of 2; Expert characters, such as Iron Man, held an Edge of 3; Characters that were the very best at what they did, such as Captain America, had an Edge of 4; cosmic-level characters, such as the Watcher, had an Edge of 5.

Characters also had 111 Powers, further customized by Stunts (additional abilities) and Limits (limitations of the power). There were 100 Skills to choose from, each of which had one of the Ability Suits as its Trump Suit.

== Reception ==
Marvel Super Heroes Adventure Game was reviewed in the online second volume of Pyramid."

== Reviews ==
- SF Site
- Backstab #11
- InQuest Gamer #40

== See also ==
- List of Marvel RPG Supplements
