= Marvel Multiverse Role-Playing Game =

Marvel Comics Tabletop Role-Playing Game

- Designers: Matt Forbeck
- Illustrators: Iban Coello
- Publishers: Marvel Universe
- Publication: 2023
- Genres: Superhero fiction
- Systems: Custom

The Marvel Multiverse Role-Playing Game (abbreviated MMRPG) is a tabletop role-playing game set in the Marvel Universe and designed by Matt Forbeck. Playable characters include Spider-Man, Black Panther, Captain America, Thor, Captain Marvel, Ms. Marvel, Wolverine, and Storm. Players can also create their own superheroes.

== Game System ==
Marvel first introduced their custom d616 Role-Playing System in the Marvel Multiverse Role-Playing Game: Playtest Rulebook.

=== Character Creation ===
Players may choose to select a pre-developed character sheet of an existing Marvel character or create their own character prior to the beginning of play. Each player that chooses to create their character records their details on a new character sheet. First, a player determines their character's rank, their overall power level between 1 and 6. They select a Backstory and Profession which gives their character Traits that will impact gameplay. Depending on their Rank players will then be able to select an additional amount of Traits and Powers. Players will also be able to put points into different ability scores, consisting of Melee, Agility, Resilience, Vigilance, Ego, and Logic.

=== Core Mechanic ===
The core mechanic involves rolling three six-sided dice with one die being designated as the "Marvel Die." The sum of the three dice are added together and further augmented by character statistics, then compared against a difficulty number. Exceeding or meeting this number means the character achieves their goal, while the opposite means failure. For certain actions, the value of the Marvel Die becomes important, as an example when in combat the value of the Marvel Die is used for damage.

== Reception ==
Cody Pondsmith for Polygon named MMRPG the best tabletop role-playing game he played in 2023, saying that "The game is utterly devoted to giving the players the feeling of playing a hero in the Marvel universe with tons of cool powers and power categories based on key Marvel heroes like Spider-Man and the Hulk." However, Chase Carter for Polygon criticized the game's design as old-fashioned and lacking heart, writing that "Its heroes feel posed, sterile and unmoving, while the game itself leans a bit too far into gimmicks and fan service" but praised the game's rank system for linking leveling-up to character development.

== Released Content ==
=== Books ===
- Marvel Multiverse Role-Playing Game: Playtest Rulebook (ISBN 978-1302934248)
- Marvel Multiverse Role-Playing Game: Core Rulebook (ISBN 978-1302927837)
- Marvel Multiverse Role-Playing Game: The Cataclysm of Kang (ISBN 978-1302948566)
- Marvel Multiverse Role-Playing Game: X-Men Expansion (ISBN 978-1302948580)
- Marvel Multiverse Role-Playing Game: Spider-Verse Expansion (ISBN 978-1302948573)
- Marvel Multiverse Role-Playing Game: Avengers Expansion (ISBN 978-1302965136)
- Marvel Multiverse Role-Playing Game: Secret Wars Expansion (ISBN 978-1-302-96936-3)

=== One Shots ===
- Marvel Multiverse Role-Playing Game: Deadpool Roleplays the Marvel Universe
- Marvel Multiverse Role-Playing Game: Fantastic Four: From the Depths
- Marvel Multiverse Role-Playing Game: The Murderworld That Time Forgot
- Marvel Multiverse Role-Playing Game: Enter Hydra
- Marvel Multiverse Role-Playing Game: Revenge Of The Super-Skrull
- Marvel Multiverse Role-Playing Game: Escape From Planet Hulk
- Marvel Multiverse Role-Playing Game: Thunderbolts* Assemble!
- Marvel Multiverse Role-Playing Game: Marvel Rivals: Timestream Adventure

=== Upcoming Releases ===
- Marvel Multiverse Role-Playing Game: Spider-Man: Midtown Mayhem
- Marvel Multiverse Role-Playing Game: Godzilla
