= Murderworld! =

- Cover
- Publishers: TSR
- Systems: Marvel Super Heroes

Murderworld! is a role-playing game adventure published by TSR in 1984 for the Marvel Super Heroes role-playing game.

== Plot summary ==
Murderworld! is an adventure scenario in which Arcade tricks the Fantastic Four into going to his deadly amusement park. Arcade tries to get the Fantastic Four to fall victum to various traps in his park. While they are away, two groups of super-villains get into the Baxter Building and fight each other, and then attack the Fantastic Four when they get back to their headquarters. Other subplots in the adventure get the Fantastic Four involved in a final confrontation that occurs in another dimension.

Arcade is usually depicted as an enemy of the X-Men rather than the Fantastic Four, although the adventure does include appearances from usual opponents of the Fantastic Four, such as Victor von Doom.

Murderworld! takes place after the first Secret Wars series, at which time She-Hulk is a member of the Fantastic Four while the Thing can change form at will back to Ben Grimm.

== Publication history ==
MH3 Murderworld! was written by Jeff Grubb, with a cover by John Byrne and illustrations by Jeff Butler, and was published by TSR, Inc., in 1984 as a 16-page book, a large color map, and an outer folder. This 16-page scenario comes inside a cover folder along with character information and a double-sided 22"x17" map.

Murderworld! is the third module that was published for the Marvel Super Heroes role-playing game.

== Reception ==
Russell Collins reviewed the adventure in The Space Gamer No. 72. He notes that "with minor modifications it could be placed at another point in their history (although no stats are given for Medusa or any other past members of the FF except the Thing)." Collins continues: "One reason to buy Marvel Super Heroes is to play the 'What if...?' game. There's an element of this here – what if the FF were taken to Murderworld, site of two X-Men adventures and one Spider-Man team up? It sets up a deathtrap for each of the heroes, complete with suggestions on how they can get out and what will happen when they do (and just in case they don't, there is the inevitable deus ex machina). And the adventure isn't over when the heroes leave Murderworld. Enough background is included to enable a group to start its own FF campaign, including stats for the late lamented Dr. Doom". He adds: "Unfortunately, this module is not without flaws. The players have to react in certain ways at certain points or the entire adventure is ruined. The labelling on the map of Murderworld gives away too much. No pieces are included for She-Hulk, Arcade, or any of the other new characters. Despite the mention that extra heroes could be added if there are more than five players, no suggestions are made about what Arcade will do with them while the FF are battling their deathtraps. And, despite its name, the main thrust of this adventure isn't Murderworld at all. People more interested in the Murderworld concept than in the FF will be disappointed. They should have called it The Invasion(s) of the Baxter Building! or something." Collins concluded the review by saying: "As a side note, the traps were obviously designed with the FF in mind; substituting four Avengers or four X-Men will not work as well. This is a flaw that is practically unique to Marvel Super Heroes – the modules so far cannot be used with characters other than those included unless the GM does some work. In conclusion, this module would make a good starting point for a Fantastic Four campaign; otherwise it is not worth it. 'Nuff said."

Marcus L. Rowland reviewed Murderworld! for White Dwarf #62, rating it 6/10 overall. He noted that the scenario was designed for the then-current Fantastic Four, with the She-Hulk replacing the Thing, but includes the Thing's statistics for his fans. Rowland reviewed the adventures The Breeder Bombs, Time Trap, and Murderworld! together, and declared that "All three adventures work reasonably well, but stress combat above role-play or campaign development. None give any opportunity for the characters to use their secret identities (an important feature of the game rules), all are extremely violent."

Pete Tamlyn reviewed Murderworld! for Imagine magazine. Now that several products had been produced to the game line, he felt that "we can start comparing them. The format is much the same as that of the previous offerings: card cover doubling as GM's quick reference shield, detailed plot neatly divided into chapters, nicely drawn maps, and illustrations by Marvel artists. The plot, in general terms, is an improvement on the other modules, in that there is more than one theme in it, giving the players more to think about." He felt that Arcade does pose a particular problem for the adventure: "Trying to use Murderworld as a setting for a scenario is not easy. To begin with, you have to get the heroes there as Arcade's prisoners, meaning that you have to arrange for the players to be defeated. Managing this without making it seem that you have fixed it so they had no chance (something which always upsets players) is difficult. Then there is Arcade's passion for making each hero suffer individually. The players have to be split up and each one put through his 'game' separately. This either leads to some very bored players and time-flow problems or to a very confused GM. Finally it is essential to the operation of Murderworld that the heroes do not realise that they are in one of Arcade's 'games'. As the module only provides a single mapsheet showing the whole of the Murderworld complex, this is pretty difficult." Tamlyn concludes by saying: "To sum up, a workmanlike job done with a bad basic idea. The module is a must for FF fans on account of the details given of the team, the Baxter building and Dr. Doom, but for the general purchased it is not such a good prospect."

== Reviews ==
- Game News #8 (Oct. 1985)
