= Cat's paw coral =

Cat's paw coral may refer to several different species of coral:

- species of the genus Psammocora
- species of the genus Stylophora
