= Marvel Universe Roleplaying Game =

Tabletop role-playing game

- Designers: Dan Gelber, Jeffrey Simons, Evan Jones, Bill Jemas, Mark D. Beazley
- Publishers: Marvel Comics
- Publication: 2003
- Genres: Superhero fiction
- Systems: Custom

The Marvel Universe Roleplaying Game (abbreviated MURPG) is a role-playing game (RPG) set in the Marvel Universe.

The game included versions of several popular Marvel characters, including Spider-Man, Hulk, Captain America, the Fantastic Four, and the X-Men. It also allowed for designing one's own heroes and villains.

== History ==
The SAGA-based Marvel Super Heroes Adventure Game (1998) was published into 2000, after which the long history between TSR and Marvel Comics ended; Marvel then published its own Marvel Universe Roleplaying Game (2003). The game featured tactical resource management, something originally made popular in the indie role-playing game movement.

== System ==
The central game mechanic is the allocation of energy/effort, in the form of "red stones". These stones, initially equal in number to the character's "Energy Reserve" statistic are allocated to powers, attacks, and defenses by the players and GM. Allocated stones are then compared to determine success or failure at tasks.

=== Task Resolution ===
Opposed tasks are handled by comparing how many red stones each character has allocated to the struggle, with the character who has put in more winning. The degree of success is determined by how many more stones the winner put in.

Normal tasks have both a Difficulty Level and a Resistance. The Difficulty Level determines the minimum value one must have in a relevant trait to have any chance of success at all. If the character's trait meets or exceeds the Difficulty Level, then the player may allocate red stones of effort to the task; the number needed to succeed is the Resistance. For some tasks, the Resistance must be overcome in a single action; for others, it may be overcome in a series of actions. The latter type usually applies where a task can be accomplished over some time—e.g., safecracking, solving a puzzle, or other such tasks.

=== Recovery ===
At the end of each turn, characters lose the red stones they expended during the turn. They then "regenerate" red stones, regaining a number depending on their Health or Intelligence, possibly modified by special powers. Energy reserves are capped, but temporary energy can be stored, draining away as time passes. While Energy Maxes are higher than normal regeneration gained.

=== Combat ===
Combat tasks are resolved using the basic task resolution system. Red stones are allocated to each character's powers, attacks, and defense (note that there is a single defense pool). Stones are then compared; defense stones count against all attacks for the turn, so the same stones may be used multiple times for defense. Some powers give bonuses to defense, but some attacks can ignore some defensive powers. If the attacker has a higher attack than the defense total, then the defender loses a number of Health equal to the attacker's excess stones (above those needed to get past the defense total). (Note, though, that some powers will make a defender lose double or triple the excess.) When Health reaches zero, a character is stunned and can no longer regenerate red stones. Further attacks have the possibility to cause a coma or kill the character.

In an effort to emulate comic book conventions, the game allows players to choose not to lose Health from an attack, but to instead have their character be "knocked out" for a time.

=== Time ===
MURPG used an abstract, flexible system of turns called "panels" and "pages". Thus, a single "page" could represent a few seconds of combat, or hours or days of building a device or searching a city.

== Promotion and cancellation ==
The main form of advertising was a 75-page pull out preview of the game featured in the April 2003 issue of InQuest Gamer which included the basic rules, minus character creation, and a number of character profiles to allow people to play the game.

== Books ==
=== Released ===
- The Marvel Universe Roleplaying Game (ISBN 0-7851-1028-3)
- Guide to The X-Men (ISBN 0-7851-1035-6)
- Guide to the Hulk & the Avengers (ISBN 0-7851-1158-1)

=== Unreleased ===
- Guide to Spider-Man's NYC (ISBN 0-7851-1305-3)
- Guide to Wolverine (ISBN 0-7851-1353-3)

== Reviews ==
- Pyramid
- Backstab #45
