= Secret Wars (adventure) =

Tabletop role-playing game adventure

- Cover
- Publishers: TSR
- Systems: Marvel Super Heroes

Secret Wars is a role-playing game adventure published by TSR in 1984 for the Marvel Super Heroes role-playing game.

== Plot summary ==
Secret Wars is an adventure scenario based on the Secret Wars comic book series, in which superheroes and supervillains battle each other on another world. The adventure is set on the Battleworld planet, which was the omnipotent Beyonder created as a place to observe what the concept of desire means to humans. The Beyonder has superheroes and supervillains fight each other to the death, offering the fulfillment of everything they want to the winners, whether it is the opportunity for acceptance or unlimited power.

Secret Wars is a package for a role-playing game campaign, providing details on the main events of the comic series and its main characters. The first episode starts as an entire galaxy is destroyed and a new planet is constructed of chunks from some of the worlds that were destroyed. An entity that calls itself the Beyonder builds this world to learn more about war between superheroes and supervillains, so he captures them from Earth, and promises to give the winners whatever they desire.

The pack includes a sixteen-page book outlining the primary events of the adventure as well as how much Karma to award for specific actions, a sixteen-page booklet with a roster of game statistics for 33 characters, a double-sided world map, and a table of superhuman characteristics and powers printed on the inside cover including every character appearing in the campaign.

== Publication history ==
MHSP1 Secret Wars was written by Jeff Grubb, with a cover by Mike Zeck, and was published by TSR, Inc., in 1984 as two 16-page books, a large color map, and an outer folder.

== Reception ==
Pete Tamlyn reviewed Secret Wars for Imagine magazine and stated that "With 12 comic books to cover there is far too much in Secret Wars to compress into a standard scenario and so the series has been presented as a campaign background. Certain set encounters must occur during play, but random events are also used and GMs are encouraged to add material of their own as well. This in itself is a welcome innovation from TSR and something I have been trying to persuade games companies to publish for sometime. I only wish TSR could have found something better to try it on."

Bob Mosley III reviewed The Secret Wars in The Space Gamer No. 75. He commented that "Secret Wars has a few good points. One point that almost qualifies as being good is that the module reveals what abstract MacGuffin the Beyonder was after, as well as the Wars themselves. The problem is that both of these outcomes were rather droll. Any players who read the series would have 'this-is-what-I'd-have-done-instead' ideas floating around in their skulls. The designers have taken most of these ideas into account by structuring the module accordingly – suggestions and helpful hints are included for various deviations from the original story. The other good point is that while there were several heroes who did not take part in the Wars, the module includes rules on running these characters, including your homebuilt ones." He continued: "Now for the bad points. We can't blame the plot on the gang at TSR, because they weren't guilty of writing it. What we can jump on them about is certain problems with the mechanics of the module, if not the game itself. For one thing, there's the options listed for alternative outcomes: The designers seem to think that if the heroes succeed in offing their opponents, the only thing they'd want is to be depowered and become accepted as normal people. Bunk! The logical option would be either something major, like obliterating crime in Earth for all eternity, or something minor, like curing Aunt May's arthritis. Those wimpos who sided with Doom aren't the only evildowers on Earth, so why become normal and fall prey to their vengeance? And while we're ranting about heroes, there are the annoying Karma figures listed for each hero. Sure, newcomers like Captain Marvel and the recycled Iron Man would have low Karma, but Thor and Captain America? Bunk again! These guys have been around too long to have a Karma Listing less than three digits. This is a serious flaw, not only with the module, but with the whole game." Mosley concluded his review by stating, "Sticking to the flaws, there's TSR's stupid policy of seldom listing a hero's stats in more than one module. All the stats for all the heroes in this adventure should have been listed. They aren't, and this only makes matters worse. What character stats are listed are vital to GMs for running other scenarios with those heroes; to buy Secret Wars for any other reason is a mistake. But then again, everyone is entitled to one mistake. Jim Shooter made twelve of them, and the last one was double-sized."

Marcus L. Rowland reviewed Secret Wars for White Dwarf #69, rating it 7/10 overall. He criticized the Beyonder's behavior and motivations, saying he "committed genocide on a scale which makes Galactus look like a small-timer" and wonders why "the Beyonder doesn't just use a telescope and watch Earth without interfering". He found the table of superhero and supervillain characteristics and powers to be "a much more useful referee's shield than the official TSR publication". Rowland found that this pack would be "an essential source for anyone who wants to run a campaign based on 'Secret Wars', or wants the statistics of a host of useful characters" although he found a few flaws, such as lower popularity ratings than expected for some characters, and skewed Karma ratings for other characters. He concluded by saying: "A more basic flaw in this package is the inability of players to earn Karma, except by combat, or make any use of their secret identities. Some characters automatically lose Karma for each day of the campaign, since they are worried about their jobs or loved ones. However, this lack of personal development is a common disadvantage of such mega-adventures. Excellent art, black and white reprints of the magazine illustrations, make this a good buy."
