= SAGA System =

Tabletop role-playing game system

The SAGA System is a role-playing game system that uses "fate cards" to determine the effects of actions. The cards have numbers, suits, positive and negative states and role-playing cues that guide the gamemaster in telling the story and administering the game.

The system is originally named after game designer Scott Adams, specifically his Adventure video games, a series of text adventures originally published 1978-1984, which upon re-release of the original 12 titles with graphic elements in 1982 were re-branded as Scott Adams Graphic Adventures (SAGA).

== Gameplay ==
In SAGA, a player holds a hand of fate cards that represent their health and the range of actions they can take. The maximum number of cards they can hold is determined by the number of quests they have completed. This replaces the experience points system of many other role-playing games. The cards replace dice-rolling, as well. When a player attempts an action, they play a card from their hand. If the suit on the card matches the action type (swords for strength-related actions, for example) it is considered "Trump." Playing a trump card means that the player can draw another card from the top of the Fate Deck and add the number on it to their total for attempting the action. When a character takes damage, the player must discard the number of points of damage to be taken from their hand. When a player has no more cards in their hand, the character is unconscious.

== Later use ==
In 1996, the system has been used in TSR, Inc.'s Dragonlance: Fifth Age game and, in 1998, the Marvel Super Heroes Adventure Game, later published by TSR. Sue Cook was the brand manager for both of those game systems and helped design the SAGA game rules.
