= Marvel Universe =

American comic book shared universe

- Various characters of the Marvel Universe. Promotional art for the 2006–2007 miniseries Civil War by Steve McNiven.
- Created by: Marvel Comics
- Original work: Marvel Mystery Comics #7 (1940, Golden Age) (Note: The first story to suggest that characters introduced in separate stories exist in the same universe. Motion Picture Funnies Weekly #1 (1939) was the first comic book issue to feature a story by Timely Comics (Marvel's predecessor) set retroactively in the Marvel universe.); Fantastic Four #12 and The Amazing Spider-Man #1 (1963, modern continuity) (Note: These two Marvel Comics issues, published on the same day, were the first to show that characters introduced in separate stories existed in the same universe. Moreover, Fantastic Four #1 (1961) is the first comic book issue published by Marvel Comics, and thus the first story set in modern continuity.)
- Owner: The Walt Disney Company

Print publications
- Novel(s): Marvel novels
- Comics: List of Marvel Comics publications
- Graphic novel(s): The Official Marvel Graphic Novel Collection

Films and television
- Film(s): List of films based on Marvel Comics publications
- Short film(s): Marvel One-Shots
- Television series: List of television series based on Marvel Comics publications
- Television special(s): Marvel Studios: Assembling a Universe; Marvel 75 Years: From Pulp to Pop!

Theatrical presentations
- Play(s): Marvel Universe Live!
- Musical(s): Spider-Man: Turn Off the Dark

Games
- Video game(s): List of video games based on Marvel Comics

Miscellaneous
- Toy(s): Marvel Universe; Marvel Select; Marvel Legends
- Theme park attraction(s): Marvel Comics in amusement parks

Official website
- https://www.marvel.com/

The Marvel Universe is a fictional shared universe that serves as the setting for American comic books and other media published by Marvel Comics. Many superheros and supervillains exist within the Marvel Universe, including the Avengers, X-Men, Fantastic Four, Guardians of the Galaxy, Spider-Man, Doctor Doom, Magneto, and many more.

The Marvel Universe contains almost all popular fictional elements and concepts from science fiction and fantasy genres, including magic, highly advanced technology, monsters, aliens, mythological figures, and, most notably, superhuman abilities.

The Marvel Universe is further depicted as existing within a "multiverse" consisting of thousands of separate universes, all of which are the creations of Marvel Comics and all of which are, in a sense, "Marvel universes". In this context, "Marvel Universe" is taken to refer to the mainstream Marvel continuity, which is known as Earth-616 or Prime Earth.

== History ==
Some of the characters in Timely Comics (the 1930s and '40s predecessor to Marvel Comics) coexisted in the same world, as first established in Marvel Mystery Comics #7 (1940) where Namor was mentioned in Human Torch's story, and vice versa. Later several superheroes (who starred in separate stories in the series up to that point) met each other in a group dubbed the All-Winners Squad.

Though the concept of a shared universe was not new or unique to comic books in 1961, writer/editor Stan Lee, together with several artists including Jack Kirby and Steve Ditko, created a series of titles where events in one book would have repercussions in another title and serialized stories would show characters' growth and change. Headline characters in one title would make cameos or guest appearances in other books. Fantastic Four #12 is the first crossover comic book in modern Marvel continuity (first meeting of Fantastic Four and the Hulk). Eventually, many of the leading heroes (Ant-Man, Wasp, Iron Man, Thor and the Hulk) assembled into a team known as the Avengers, which debuted in September 1963. This was not the first time that Marvel's characters had interacted with one another—Namor and the original Human Torch had been rivals when Marvel was Timely Comics (Marvel Vault), under editor Martin Goodman — but it was the first time that the comic book publisher's characters seemed to share a world. The Marvel Universe was also notable for setting its central titles in New York City; by contrast, many DC heroes live in fictional cities. Care was taken to portray the city and the world as realistically as possible, with the presence of superhumans affecting the common citizens in various ways.

Over time, a few Marvel Comics writers lobbied Marvel editors to incorporate the idea of a Multiverse resembling DC's parallel worlds; this plot device allows one to create several fictional universes which normally do not overlap. What happens on Earth in the main Marvel Universe would normally not affect what happens on a parallel Earth in another Marvel-created universe. However, writers would have the creative ability to write stories in which people from one such universe would visit this alternative universe.

In 1982, Marvel published the miniseries Contest of Champions, in which all of the major heroes in existence at the time were gathered together to deal with one threat. This was Marvel's first miniseries. Each issue contained biographical information on many major costumed characters; these biographies were a precursor to Marvel's series of reference material, The Official Handbook of the Marvel Universe, which followed shortly on the heels of Contest of Champions.

== Concepts ==
The Marvel Universe is strongly based on the real world. Earth in the Marvel Universe has all the features of the real one: same countries, same personalities (politicians, movie stars, etc.), same historical events (such as World War II), and so on; however, it also contains many other fictional elements: countries such as Wakanda and Latveria and organizations like the espionage agency S.H.I.E.L.D. and its enemies, Hydra and A.I.M. In 2009, Marvel officially described its world's geography in a two-part miniseries, the Marvel Atlas.

Most importantly, the Marvel Universe also incorporates examples of almost all major science fiction and fantasy concepts, with writers adding more continuously. Aliens, gods, magic, cosmic powers and advanced technology all exist prominently in the Marvel Universe. These extra elements are incorporated simultaneously into the stories, lending to the existence of the superpowered characters. The general public is so familiar with such concepts that Empire State University has a scholarship for "aliens, dimensional travelers, clones, independent machine intelligences and other students outside the norm", businesses and residences have superhero property insurance bookmakers take bets on their battles' outcomes, and New York air traffic controllers handle starships landing at local airports.

Comparatively, little time passes in the Marvel Universe compared to the real world, owing to the serial nature of storytelling, with the stories of certain issues picking up mere seconds after the conclusion of the previous one, while a whole month has passed by in "real-time". Marvel's major heroes were created in the 1960s, but the amount of time that has passed between then and now within the universe itself has (after a prolonged period of being identified as about 10 years in the mid-to-late 1990s) most recently been identified as 13 years. Consequently, the settings of some events which were contemporary when written have to be updated every few years to "make sense" in this floating timeline. Thus, the events of previous stories are considered to have happened within a certain number of years before the publishing date of the current issue. For example, Spider-Man's high school graduation was published in Amazing Spider-Man #28 (September 1965), his college graduation in Amazing Spider-Man #185 (October 1978), and his high school reunion in Marvel Knights Spider-Man #7 (December 2004). Because of the floating timeline, where stories refer to real-life historic events, these references are later ignored or rewritten to suit current sensibilities; for instance, the origin of Iron Man was changed in a 2004 storyline to refer to the war on terror in Afghanistan, whereas the original Iron Man stories had referred to the Vietnam War in Vietnam; similarly, the Punisher's backstory has also been changed as well.

Marvel Comics itself exists as a company within the Marvel Universe, and versions of people such as Stan Lee and Jack Kirby have appeared in some of the stories, whereas characters like Steve Rogers, (Captain America's alter ego), have worked for Marvel. The Marvel of this reality publishes comics that adapt the actual adventures of the superheroes (except for details not known to the public, like their secret identities); many of these are licensed with the permission of the heroes themselves, who customarily donate their share of profits to charity. Additionally, the DC Comics Universe is also said to exist in the Marvel Universe as one of the many alternative universes. The reverse may also be said concerning the DC Universe. This is one method of explaining the various crossover stories co-published by the two companies.

Pop culture characters such as Sherlock Holmes, Dracula, and Frankenstein's Monster exist in the Marvel Universe. This is usually justified as a second-hand account of events as told to credited authors Arthur Conan Doyle, Bram Stoker, and Mary Shelley, although the general public continues to believe them to be fictional. Robert E. Howard's Conan the Barbarian, Red Sonja, Kull the Conqueror, and Solomon Kane also have real-life existences in the Marvel Universe. The Hyborian Era of Conan and Kull is considered part of Earth-616 pre-recorded history. However, they rarely encounter modern Marvel superhero characters. This is most likely possible due to the uncertain legal status of Howard's works before 2006 when they became public domain. As of 2019, Conan the Barbarian, as well as Kull the Conqueror and Solomon Kane, have been firmly integrated, thanks to Marvel regaining the publishing rights to the characters. Other licensed works that have been incorporated into the Marvel Universe include Godzilla, the Transformers, the film 2001: A Space Odyssey (in the character of Machine Man), Rom the Spaceknight, the Micronauts, and the Shogun Warriors. In most cases, such material is either restricted from use after the license expires or the characters redesigned or renamed to avoid copyright infringement.

=== Costumed superheroes and supervillains ===
Within the fictional history of the Marvel Universe, the tradition of using costumed secret identities to fight or commit evil had long existed, but it came into prominence during the days of the American "Wild West" with heroes such as Carter Slade/the Phantom Rider. During the 20th century, the tradition was reinvigorated by Steve Rogers/Captain America and the Invaders in the 1940s, who fought for the Allies of World War II.

Unlike the DC Universe, few of Marvel's Golden Age characters have risen to prominence in modern publications; Captain America is one exception, and to a lesser extent, his contemporary, Namor, primarily because both of these characters were reintroduced to readers and the Marvel Universe during the 1960s.

Marvel's most prominent heroes were created during the Silver Age of Comic Books in the 1960s to early 1970s, including Spider-Man, Doctor Strange, Daredevil, Nick Fury, the Black Panther, the Silver Surfer, and the early members of the Avengers, X-Men, Fantastic Four, and the Inhumans. (Note: Early Avengers including Iron Man, Wasp, Hank Pym, Hulk, Thor, Scarlet Witch, Quicksilver, Vision, Hawkeye, Black Widow, Wonder Man, Hercules, Mar-Vell Carol Danvers and Falcon) (Note: Early X-Men including Beast, Warren Worthington III, Jean Grey, Cyclops, Iceman, Professor X, Polaris, and Havok, Banshee, and Sunfire) (Note: The Fantastic Four consisted of Mister Fantastic, The Thing, Invisible Woman, and Human Torch (Johnny Storm))

The Bronze Age and Modern Age from the early-to-mid 1970s to the early 1990s introduced many new additions to every corner of the Marvel Universe. The comics introduced street heroes such as the Heroes for Hire and the Punisher, space heroes including many members of the future Guardians of the Galaxy and Nova, and supernatural heroes such as Ghost Rider and Blade. New members were added to existing hero teams, including Wolverine, Storm, Kitty Pryde, Colossus, Nightcrawler, Rogue, Psylocke and Dazzler to the X-Men; and Mockingbird, Monica Rambeau, and Tigra to the Avengers. Other notable debuts include Scott Lang, Black Cat, Emma Frost, She-Hulk, Jessica Drew, Elektra, Man Thing, and Moon Knight, and new teams including the New Mutants, Alpha Flight, Eternals, Power Pack and the New Warriors.

From the mid-90s to present, Marvel created characters such as Deadpool, Gambit, Cable, Domino, the Thunderbolts, the Runaways, Shuri, Phil Coulson, and Maria Hill. Legacy characters became a popular staple during this time, introducing characters such as X-23, Miles Morales, Yelena Belova, Cassie Lang, Kamala Khan, Kate Bishop, Moon Girl, America Chavez, Robbie Reyes, Ironheart and Spider-Gwen.

Prominent teams of superheroes include the Avengers, the X-Men, the Fantastic Four, the Defenders, the Inhumans, S.H.I.E.L.D., the Howling Commandos, the Guardians of the Galaxy, the Runaways, the Midnight Sons and the Thunderbolts. Notable supervillain teams include the Masters of Evil, the Emissaries of Evil, the Brotherhood of Mutants, the Sinister Six, the Frightful Four, the Lethal Legion, the Legion of the Unliving, the Black Order, the Annihilation Wave, and the Cabal.

=== Origin of superhuman powers ===
Most of the superhumans in Marvel's Earth owe their powers to the Celestials, cosmic entities who visited Earth millions of years ago and experimented on their prehistoric ancestors (a process they also carried out on several other planets). This resulted in the creation of two hidden races, the godlike Eternals and the genetically unstable Deviants, in addition to giving some humans an "x-factor" in their genes, which sometimes activates naturally, resulting in sometimes superpowered, sometimes disfigured individuals called mutants. Others require other factors (such as radiation) for their powers to come forth. Depending on the genetic profile, individuals who are exposed to different chemicals or radiation will often suffer death or injury, while in others it will cause superhuman abilities to manifest. Except for psionic abilities, these powers are usually random. It is not clear why the Celestials did this, although it is known that they continue to observe humanity's evolution. A Marvel series titled Earth X explored one possible reason for this: that superhumans are meant to protect a Celestial embryo that grows inside Earth against any planetary threats and have done so for eons. The majority of the public is unaware of what may cause superhuman powers.

Some heroes and villains have no powers at all but depend instead on hand-to-hand combat training or advanced technological equipment. In the Marvel Universe, technology is considerably more advanced than in the real world; this is due to unique individuals of genius-level intelligence, such as Reed Richards (Mister Fantastic) of the Fantastic Four. However, most of the advanced devices are too expensive for the common citizen, and are usually in the hands of government organizations like S.H.I.E.L.D., or powerful criminal organizations like A.I.M. Advanced technology has also been given to humans by hidden races, aliens, or time travelers like Kang the Conqueror, who is known to have influenced the robotics industry in the past.

The Marvel Universe has a vast number of additional sources of superhuman powers, including cosmic forces (such as the Power Cosmic or Phoenix Force), extra dimensions (such as the Darkforce and Lightforce dimensions), or the many branches of magic. Some races are born with natural powers beyond the means of humans.

=== Races ===
In Marvel Comics, mutants (Homo superior) are a key source of storytelling and the origins of a number of prominent characters, mostly those in the X-Men universe. Mutants are born with the X-gene, often granting them superhuman abilities and sometimes physical mutations differing them from normal humans. Many people of the Marvel Universe fear or despise mutants, seeing them as dangerous threats. This has caused organizations to form to deal with the problem. Some seek peaceful coexistence between mutants and normal humans (the X-Men and their affiliated groups), those who seek to control or eliminate humans to give mutants safety or dominance (Magneto and his followers, as well as other mutants such as Apocalypse), and those who seek to regulate or eliminate mutants in favor of humans.

In addition to mutants, Eternals, and Deviants, several other intelligent races have existed secretly on Earth. These include the Inhumans, another genetically unstable race (like the Deviants, but in their case, it is due to their use of a substance called the Terrigen Mist) that was created by a Kree experiment long ago; the Subterraneans, a race of humanoids adapted to living below the surface, created by the Deviants (some Subterraneans were transformed into the 'Lava Men' by a demon); and Homo mermanus, a humanoid species of water-breathers that live in Earth's oceans. Most of these races have advanced technology but existed hidden from humanity until recent times. More variants of humanity can be found in the Savage Land (see Places below). Most of the Savage Land races have their origin from a group of primitive ape-men who seems to have escaped the Celestial experiments and whose influence is present in all modern Homo sapiens. Other leftovers from the era when primitive humanoids walked on Earth still exist, such as the radiation-altered Neanderthal man known as the Missing Link, an enemy of the Hulk.

=== Alien races ===
The Marvel Universe also contains hundreds of intelligent alien races. Earth has interacted with many of them because a major "hyperspace warp" happens to exist in the Solar System.

The three major space empires are:

- the Kree, who rule the Kree Empire (in the Greater Magellanic Cloud)
- the Skrulls, who rule the Skrull Empire (in the Andromeda Galaxy)
- the Shi'ar, who rule the Shi'ar Empire.

The three are often in direct or indirect conflict, which occasionally involves Earth humans; in particular, the Kree and Skrulls are ancient enemies, and the Kree-Skrull War has involved humans on several occasions.

Another prominent alien race is the Watchers, immortal and wise beings who watch over the Marvel Universe and have taken a sacred vow not to intervene in events, though the Watcher assigned to Earth, Uatu, has violated this oath on several occasions.

The Elders of the Universe are ancient aliens who have often had a great impact on many worlds for billions of years, acting alone or as a group. A power called the Power Primordial is channeled through them.

Many other races exist and have formed an "Intergalactic Council" to have their say on matters that affect them all, such as interference from Earth humans in their affairs.

=== Supernatural creatures ===
Also abundant in the Marvel Universe are legendary creatures such as gods, demons and vampires. The 'gods' of most polytheistic pantheons are powerful, immortal human-like races residing in other dimensions who visited Earth in ancient times, and became the basis of many legends. However, all of these 'gods' share a common ancestry and connection to Earth due to Gaea, the primeval Elder Goddess that infused her life essence into all living things on Earth. Besides mythological gods, many deities made up by Marvel writers exist as well, such as the Dark Gods, enemies of the Asgardians.

Angels and demons have appeared throughout the franchise, with some form of Heaven and Hell existing on other planes in the Universe. Some notable demons include Blackheart, Mephisto, Nightmare, and Satannish. There are also powerful benevolent mystical entities such as the Vishanti; or amoral and malevolent entities who are not truly demonic, such as Dormammu and the Octessence, or ones heavily drawing upon the mythologies of H. P. Lovecraft and Robert E. Howard. Some supernatural beings, entities and human characters created by Lovecraft and Howard, who were friends and influenced each other's work, have been adapted by Marvel and include Abdul Alhazred, Conan the Barbarian Nyarlathotep and Set. Some deities or demonic beings that are original characters of Marvel have been heavily influenced by these mythologies, such as Shuma-Gorath.

Most of the current generation of gods have been revealed to be the descendants of the Elder Goddess Gaea. The two most featured pantheons are the Asgardians (of whom Thor is a member) and the Olympians (of whom Hercules is a member). The lords of the various pantheons sometimes gather in groups known as either the Council of Godheads or the Council of Skyfathers. The gods were forced to stop meddling with humanity (at least openly) a thousand years ago by the Celestials, and most people today believe them to be fictional. Other pantheons have been depicted in the Marvel Universe that is still actively worshiped in the real world, including those worshiped by the Aboriginal inhabitants of Australia, the gods of Hinduism, the Shinto gods and the gods of Zoroastrianism. These deities are rarely depicted, however. To avoid offending the believers of still active religions, Marvel features such deities as characters in the background or who make very brief cameo appearances.

The Marvel Universe also contains a number of monsters. Classic monsters such as vampires, werewolves, ghosts, and zombies all exist within the Universe, as well as fictional monster races. Monsters were prominent in early publications such as Journey into Mystery and Strange Tales.

=== Cosmic entities ===
The cosmic entities are beings of unbelievably great levels of power (the weakest of whom can destroy entire planets) who exist to perform duties that maintain the existence of the universe. Most do not care at all about "lesser beings" such as humans, and as a consequence, their acts are recurrently dangerous to mortals. When dire threats threaten the universe, it is not uncommon for these beings to gather together to discuss the threat and even act on it.

Most conceptual entities are simply interested in furthering their essential function or to keep the balance with an opposing force. However, certain cosmic entities, such as Galactus, the In-Betweener, the Maelstrom, or the Stranger have demonstrated personality, motivations, or (except for the first one mentioned) even ambitions beyond their functions, but often maintain the perspective that morality is entirely relative, or that destroying civilizations of "lesser" beings is no eviler than if these beings destroyed an anthill. Others such as Uatu the Watcher, Eon, or the Celestials, Ashema and Tiamut are aberrations in the sense of sympathizing with, and occasionally coming to the defense of, humanity.

The Phoenix Force is composed of the psionic energy from all living beings' past, present, and future, and is an embodiment of rebirth and destructive transformation through "burning away what doesn't work", and helped to restart the universe before the Big Bang.

'The "Fulcrum" is a comparatively recent addition to the hierarchy, that "all" cosmic entities allegedly serve, of a level of raw power stated to far surpass the might of the Watchers and the Celestials. Unlike most other entities, it is capable of conscience, compassion, and even a sense of humor, and has stated that it wants other cosmic beings to develop such as well. He is a possible manifestation/avatar of the One-Above-All.

The mentioned One-Above-All is believed to be the supreme, omnipotent being, who solely created the Marvel Multiverse, and possibly acted beyond. He also brought to life the Living Tribunal, an extremely powerful cosmic entity, who serves to maintain balance within the Multiverse.

== Cosmology ==
=== Multiverse ===
The Marvel Universe is part of a Multiverse, with various universes coexisting simultaneously, usually without affecting each other directly. Furthermore, each universe has various other dimensions associated with it, and one such group is collectively known as a Reality. Often what is referred to in the comics as a Universe is actually a Reality. According to mythology, the Multiverse has been created by the omnipotent being One-Above-All.

Even the Marvel Multiverse, however, is only a part of the Omniverse, which consists of all of fiction and reality combined, including all the works that are outside of Marvel's copyright restrictions.

The action of most of the Marvel Comics titles takes place in a continuity known as Earth-616. This continuity exists in a multiverse alongside trillions of alternative continuities. Alternative continuities in the Marvel Multiverse are generally defined in terms of their differences from Earth-616.

=== Time ===
==== The "sliding timeline" ====
The generally accepted solution to [the Marvel Universe's problem of time] is the "sliding timeline," a wonderfully convenient bit of undiluted sophistry. The clock of the story starts running with Fantastic Four #1, and the events of that issue take place about fourteen years before right now, whenever "right now" is. Anachronistic elements of old comics, like Aunt May watching The Beverly Hillbillies on TV in Amazing Spider-Man Annual #1, are "topical references," inserted into the published versions of the story to backdate them.

— Douglas Wolk, All of the Marvels: A Journey to the Ends of the Biggest Story Ever Told

An explanation for the irregular passing of time in the Marvel Universe was given by Galactus to the Ultimates, namely that some important events – for instance, the creation of the Fantastic Four or the Avengers – have a 'gravity' all their own and warp time around them, causing the timeline to subtly change to accommodate this.

This concept editorially is referred to as a "sliding" or "floating timeline", a storytelling feature that allows for the characters to continuously exist within a contemporary setting by slowly shifting the time frame forward, with a slow, non-linear progression of in-universe time throughout Marvels publication history. Marvel editor Tom Breevort has stated that the origins of the Fantastic Four took place roughly 15 years ago, with all events after fitting into the new time frame.

=== Space ===
While the Marvel Universe is presumably as large as the non-fictional universe comic book readers inhabit, for all intents and purposes the Local Group is the universe; practically all action takes place in it. The Skrull Empire is located in the Andromeda Galaxy, the Kree Empire in the Greater Magellanic Cloud, which is a satellite of the Milky Way galaxy in which Earth is found, and the Shi´ar Empire is located somewhere between them in one of the smaller galaxies (perhaps the Triangulum Galaxy); frequently, these three empires are quoted as the main political powers "in the universe". Similarly, the Local Group seems to be the only affected area when the Annihilation Wave cut its bloody swath "across the universe".

== Other media ==
Four role-playing games have been set in the Marvel Universe:

- Marvel Super Heroes (TSR, 1984)
- Marvel Super Heroes Adventure Game (TSR, 1998)
- Marvel Universe Roleplaying Game (Marvel Comics, 2003)
- Marvel Heroic Roleplaying (Margaret Weis Productions, 2012)

== See also ==
- Features of the Marvel Universe
- List of Marvel Comics alien races
- List of Marvel Comics characters
- List of Marvel Comics superhero debuts
- List of Marvel Comics teams and organizations
- Marvel Animated Universe (MAU)
- Publication history of Marvel Comics crossover events
