= Marvel Super Heroes: The Heroic Role-Playing Game =

1984 role-playing game boxed set

- Cover
- Publishers: TSR
- Systems: Marvel Super Heroes

Marvel Super Heroes: The Heroic Role-Playing Game is a role-playing game boxed set published by TSR in 1984 for the Marvel Super Heroes role-playing game, and was the debut product for the game.

== Contents ==
Marvel Super Heroes: The Heroic Role-Playing Game is a boxed set detailing a superhero role-playing system featuring the characters and universe appearing in publications by Marvel Comics, with a simple set of introductory rules which utilize a single "Universal Table" to determine the results of any kind of action. A round is referred to as "one panel in a comic book" instead of a specific length of time. A universal table, along with a simple table for battle effects, is used for dice resolution.

The Battle Book (16 pages) functions as a simplified game introduction, hosted by Spider-Man. The book provides rules for combat, which is oriented by position of characters and objects. It contains the basic rules of the game, including characteristics, and rules for basic feats and combat statistics and rules. It demonstrates the seven main characteristics (Fighting, Agility, Strength, Endurance, Reason, Intuition, and Psyche) plus the four variable characteristics: Health, Karma, Resources and Popularity. It also emphasizes that all of these statistics vary throughout the game. Each characteristic has a value which is rated on a scale of 11 grades ranging from at the lowest "Feeble" to "Class 1000" which is unattainable by player characters. Powers and skills use the same scale for ratings and their function is determined by a dice roll against the table printed on the back cover of both booklets. Characters can alter their dice rolls by spending Karma which characters can gain more of by doing good deeds or meeting obligations. Karma can also be removed from the character through misdeeds, crimes, and even mistakes. Supervillains earn their Karma by committing crimes or by defeating and humiliating their opponents.

The "Campaign Book" (48 pages) details characters (with a sample demonstration of how to create a character), vehicles and equipment, and information on how to run a campaign. The Campaign Book focuses on character generation, how superpowers function and can be used, and how equipment is designed and used properly. The Campaign Book provides multiple examples for every character characteristic and rank. The Campaign book offers two character generation methods: either a system of purely random generation by die rolls, and a system in which the player chooses the levels of all characteristics, powers and skills, and then the gamemaster reviews the character for approval or to modify them to a level appropriate for the campaign or adventure. Karma points may be allocated for a special purpose and saved in pools to improve or obtain new characteristics and powers, although significant losses of Karma can eliminate accumulated pools.

"Day of the Octopus" (16 pages) is an adventure scenario, including statistics for several superheroes and supervillains from the comics. "Day of the Octopus" features Captain America, Spider-Man, Captain Marvel, and the Thing opposing a group of several supervillains commanded by Doctor Octopus. The scenario consists of six chapters, each presenting different campaign developments as well as descriptions of various parts of the setting, characters and weapons involved; most of these chapters must be played on the large map that comes in the box.

The rest of the components that come with the game function as aids to the players and the gamemaster. The "character records" detail the Fantastic Four, Spider-Man, Wolverine, Captain Marvel, and Captain America. Each of these cards features a color illustration of the character on the glossy front side, and a summary of the personal information and game statistics on the rear of the card. The counters represent characters and objects and are marked with an arrow to show their location when set on the map. All the counters for characters show the secret identity on one side, and the superhero or supervillain identity on the other. The map displays a few blocks of a sample city on one side, and detailed interior diagrams of some buildings on the other side.

== Publication history ==
TSR produced the game under license from Marvel. Kevin and Brian Blume guided TSR in the early 1980s to compete for a Marvel Comics license against companies such as Fantasy Games Unlimited, Games Workshop and Mayfair Games, and TSR ultimately used its top industry position and existing relationship with Marvel to obtain the license; TSR referred to this project as "Boot Hill revision" to conceal this license as long as possible, and they were able to release the role-playing game Marvel Super Heroes (1984).

Marvel Super Heroes: The Heroic Role-Playing Game was written by Jeff Grubb and Steve Winter, with a scenario by Bruce Nesmith, and was published by TSR, Inc., in 1984 as a boxed set containing a 48-page book, two 16-page books, cardboard counters, a color map, and dice.

== Reception ==
Allen Varney reviewed the initial game supplement in The Space Gamer #70. Varney commented that "this is a respectable effort, and an excellent introductory game for a devoted Marvel fan aged 10 to 12; older, more experienced, or less devoted buyers will probably be disappointed. 'Nuff said."

Ken Rolston reviewed Marvel Super Heroes for Dragon magazine #91 (November 1984). Rolston commented that "The mechanics are original and simple, the tone is practical and informal, and the presentation is direct and entertaining. [...] The game is much simpler than the Champions, Villains and Vigilantes, and Superworld games, and certainly a better choice for younger gamers. Confirmed supporters of these older systems will probably not be seduced by the clean rules design, having come to love the chains of their detailed and time-consuming character-generation systems."

Pete Tamlyn reviewed Marvel Super Heroes for Imagine magazine, and stated that "this game has been produced in collaboration with Marvel and that opportunity itself is probably worth a new game release. However, Marvel Superheroes is not just another Superhero game. In many ways it is substantially different from other SHrpgs."

Troy Christensen reviewed Marvel Super Heroes for Different Worlds magazine and stated that "The Marvel Super Heroes roleplaying game overall is a basic and simple system which I would recommend for beginning and novice players [...] People who enjoy a fast and uncomplicated game and like a system which is conservative and to the point will like this game."

Marcus L. Rowland reviewed Marvel Super Heroes: The Heroic Role-Playing Game for White Dwarf #62, rating it 8/10 overall. He stated that the game "features simple combat and power rules, good reasons for superheroes to spend time in their secret identities, and artwork based on the original comics", and stated, "Overall, the game rules and mechanics are simple and work reasonably well. Experienced referees may find the rules a little simplistic (for example, characters don't get tired or lose points while using powers, unless they expend Karma), but they certainly reflect the slamming action in most comics. Combat is resolved quickly, and the rules encourage role-playing as well as heroics." He concluded by declaring the initial boxed set "a useful system which is suitable for beginning players and referees, but should still suit experienced gamers".

== Reviews ==
- Adventurers Club #5 (Fall 1984 Digest)
- Griffin #1 (Winter 1984–1985)
- Game News #6 (Aug., 1985)
- Jeux & Stratégie #54
