= Marvel Super Heroes Advanced Set =

Tabletop role-playing game

- Cover of Marvel Superheroes: Advanced Set
- Publishers: TSR
- Systems: Marvel Super Heroes

Marvel Super Heroes Advanced Set is a role-playing game supplement published by TSR in 1986 for the Marvel Super Heroes role-playing game.

== Contents ==
Marvel Super Heroes Advanced Set is a boxed set which contains a more complex but standalone version of the rules found in the original Marvel Super Heroes: The Heroic Role-Playing Game basic set. It contains a more elaborate "Universal Table" which enables a wider variety of results to happen. Character creation involves detailed superhuman powers now in 10 categories (such as Movement, Mental Powers, or Energy Control), and combat is more complex as well and has rules for magic. This set presents statistics for many weapons and vehicles, more information on campaigns, game statistics for 45 heroes, 28 villains, and 9 special entities, as well as character cards and cardstock miniatures. The Advanced Set includes a Judge's Book as well as a larger set of character statistic cards, 3-D fold-up characters and a map not found in the original set.

The set provides a new character generation system in which characters can have attributes of any value, with rank determined according to the range where the score falls. The set includes expansions to the FEAT and combat systems which allows for an increase in available types of action and with improved definitions of what characters are able to do and how to determine the appropriate results. Resources have become an attribute instead of a pool of points that a character spends, and every power is given a rating to show its strength and allow for FEATs for that power. Negative popularity has become an official rule. The rules for area movement were retained, with an alternative system for ranged movement added. Comprehensive tables for weapons and vehicles statistics are included as well as rules for constructing a headquarters. The Universal Table is expanded at its higher end to include extremely powerful beings. The game rules are all in the Players' Book, while the Judges' Book contains Advanced Set statistics for all of the significant Marvel characters. The set comes with soft plastic dice and a wax crayon, as well as card character sheets and card figures, and a map of New York.

== Publication history ==
Marvel Super Heroes Advanced Set was written by Jeff Grubb, with art by Jeff Butler, and was published by TSR, Inc., in 1986 as a boxed set containing a 96-page book, a 64-page book, a cardstock booklet, a color map, and dice.

== Reception ==
Pete Tamlyn reviewed Marvel Super Heroes Advanced Set for White Dwarf #84. Regarding the rules, Tamlyn states: "Jeff Grubb has done a pretty slick job, both in expanding the system without over-complicating it [...] and in explaining it all in an entertaining manner." He was critical of the set's complexity, "TSR seem to believe in simple, improvisational games for kids and complex, rule-heavy ones for adults." He continued, "Whether you need MSH Advanced depends on how you like to run your games. If you're starting out, provided it is not your first roleplaying game, I'd go for the Advanced game but be prepared to treat a lot of what it says as guidelines only."

Andrew Pearson reviewed Marvel Super Heroes: Advanced in Space Gamer/Fantasy Gamer No. 78. He rated the complexity as low, and the rules clarity and graphics quality as excellent. Pearson commented that "As other reviewers have said of the original, the advanced set has realism. The realism of this set is of the intensity one would have if he or she were actually living out a Marvel Comic. A more comprehensive listing of powers and talents is given in the new Player's Book. More exacting explanations of these features are given that can be compared to the realistic spell explanations in TSR's Advanced Dungeons & Dragons Player's Handbook. Contacts are now the replacement of Neighbors, Friends, etc. Of course this does not mean you cannot have neighbors or friends, it just means that you can have a larger amount of each. Contacts are those who can aid you in a gainful way during a campaign (i.e. support, information, equipment)." He added that "A major change is the deletion of Resource Points. It was figured that a large amount of Resource Points would be difficult to handle in numerous transactions. Replacing the points is a Resource FEAT which is rolled like other FEATs. Only one Resource FEAT may be rolled per game week and the roll signifies if such a cost purchase can be made. This limits the amount of large purchases a wealthy character may make, though. Very few other changes have been made to the rules in this set, so as to keep the simplicity in the game playing making it entertaining and exciting." Pearson commented that "The Judge's Book contains very little practical information, containing mostly combat information, but it does contain a set of character states for various Marvel characters like Wolverine, Doctor Doom, and the Kree. The character stat cards are like the original set, but there are more of them and they are more colorful." He noted that "The artwork of the Advanced Set is superb as it's done by the infamous Marvel Bullpen but it is sparse by a Marvel fan's standards." Pearson concluded his review by giving the product a 9 out of a possible 10 on the basis of "entertainment value, artwork, easy of playing and realism", stating that "The problem that keeps it from receiving a 10 is that the character stats in the Judge's Book are by no means complete. TSR has announced that it is releasing an Advances Set Marval Hand-book, a form of roleplaying version of the popular Handbook of the Marvel Universe series put out by Marvel, to solve the problem, though."

Thomas A. Grant reviewed Marvel Super Heroes Advanced Set for Different Worlds magazine and stated that "If you have the money and you absolutely want to role-play in the Marvel Universe (are there any comics fans who don't?), then swallow your pride and buy Marvel Super Heroes Advanced Set. It's a good system, and there's no other way you can open a box and within one or two hours say, 'It's clobber in' time!'"

Shannon Appelcline commented that the Marvel Super Heroes Advanced Set helped to offset any complaints from gamers about simplicity of the original game.

== Reviews ==
- Fantasy Chronicles #3 (Sep 1986)
- Casus Belli #36 (Feb 1987)
