= Jeff Butler =

American illustrator and comic book artist

- Born: February 26, 1958 (age 67); Madison, Wisconsin, U.S.
- Known for: Comics, fantasy art
- Spouse: Laurel Layman (m. 1985)

Jeff Butler (born February 26, 1958, in Madison, Wisconsin) is an American illustrator and comic book artist. He worked with the art department of TSR, Inc. for five years, illustrating products for the Dungeons & Dragons fantasy role-playing game and the Marvel Super Heroes role playing game, as well as Dragonlance novels.

== Early life ==
Jeff Butler was born in Madison, Wisconsin on February 26, 1958. He grew up playing sports, "But I was always drawing things when I was young. I was a mischievous little boy, and my mother used to stick me in the corner with paper and a pencil and tell me to draw to keep me quiet. Then came the comic books when I was a little older, much to the chagrin of my father. Mom thought the comic books were teaching me to read, but my father, who is a sportswriter for a Madison newspaper, thought they were no good for me." Butler elaborates on his comics pastime, "At first, I read all the DC Comics I could get my hands on, and then moved on to Marvel Comics ... I used to practice drawing the figures from the comic books." In high school, Butler continued drawing as well as his sports activities. "Oh geez, this is so corny, but I was the football captain who went out with the cheerleading captain."

In junior high and high school (at Madison West High School), Butler discovered fantasy through the Conan the Barbarian paperback books, and later Fritz Leiber and Lord of the Rings books. In college, Butler studied sports illustration and did some portrait work, as well as doing some illustrations for newspapers, magazines, and posters on the side, and a Budweiser poster for the university football team. "I was a fine arts major in college (University of Wisconsin–Madison), but I ended up splitting my time between the university and Madison Area Technical College (MATC) so I could get some commercial art instruction." Butler played quarterback for the Wisconsin Badgers at university in 1977, but stopped because of a series of concussions.

While in school, Butler met Mike Baron, who created the Nexus comic book with Steve Rude for Capital Comics. Baron sought Butler out after seeing a poster Butler had created for a UW-Madison fraternity rush. Butler and Baron collaborated for Capital, creating The Badger. "I worked on the first few issues of the comic book, but Capital was having some cash flow problems at the time, so they put their titles up for sale."

== Career ==
One of Butler's teachers from MATC told him about a job opening for an artist at TSR in Lake Geneva, Wisconsin. He interviewed with the company, and was hired in February 1984. "When I first came to TSR, the Marvel Super Heroes Game was just starting to roll, so I had lots of fun those first few months doing the kind of comic book art I loved. Now, I like working on the Marvel paintings for the book covers. I can flesh things out and make these characters look real." Butler also worked on black-and-white art for Dungeons & Dragons products and the Dragonlance series, and did color work such as the Conan Role-Playing Game box cover.

Butler married his high school sweetheart (the cheerleading captain), Laurel Layman in 1985.

After leaving TSR in 1989, Butler worked as a freelance illustrator and comic book artist for nine years, working on projects including The Green Hornet, Godzilla, Hercules, Xena, Jurassic Park and the monthly Ghostwriter strip for the Children's Television Workshop magazine, Kid City. His Hercules drawings appeared in a 1996 issue of TV Guide.

Butler joined the Raven Software art staff in the fall of 1997 after returning to his native Madison with his family, and began learning computer game art. Butler served as the 2-D Art Lead on Heretic II and has worked on other games such as Soldier of Fortune and Star Trek, Elite Force. Butler has been part of the art team for Star Wars Jedi Knight II: Jedi Outcast, X-Men Legends, X-Men Legends II: Rise of Apocalypse, Marvel: Ultimate Alliance, and has been part of the core team for X-Men Origins: Wolverine and Wolfenstein.
