= Marvel Super Heroes (role-playing game) =

Super hero role-playing game

- 1984 edition, cover art by John Romita Jr.
- Designers: Jeff Grubb
- Publishers: TSR
- Publication: 1984 (1st edition); 1991 (revised edition); 1986 (Advanced Game)
- Genres: Superhero fiction
- Systems: Custom

Marvel Super Heroes ('MSH') is a licensed role playing game set in the Marvel Universe, first published by TSR in 1984. The game lets players assume the roles of Marvel superheroes such as Spider-Man, Daredevil, Hulk, Captain America, the Fantastic Four, and the X-Men. The game was designed to be easily understood, and this approach proved popular. TSR published an expanded edition, Marvel Superheroes Advanced Game in 1986.

== System ==
=== Character generation ===
Players can either use pre-generated characters based on actual Marvel comic book heroes, or they can create an "original hero". To do this, the player describes the desired super hero its super powers to the gamemaster. The game master then assigns the character its abilities and powers based on the player's description.

=== Attributes ===
Players resolve most game situations by rolling percentile dice and comparing the results against a column of the colorful "Universal Results Table". The attribute used determines which column to use; different tasks map to different attributes.

All characters have seven basic attributes:

- Fighting determines hit probability in and defense against hand-to-hand attacks.
- Agility determines hit probability in and defense against ranged attacks, feats of agility vs. the environment, and acrobatics.
- Strength determines damage inflicted by hand-to-hand attacks, grappling, or lifting and breaking heavy objects.
- Endurance determines resistance to physical damage (e.g., poison, disease, death). It also determines how long a character can fight and how fast a character can move at top speed.
- Reason determines the success of tasks relating to knowledge, puzzle-solving, and advanced technology.
- Intuition determines the success of tasks relating to awareness, perception, and instinct.
- Psyche determines the success of tasks relating to willpower, psionics, and magic.

Players sometimes refer to this set of attributes and the game system as a whole by the acronym "FASERIP". Attribute scores for most characters range from 1 to 100, where normal human ability is Typical (6), and peak (non-superheroic) human ability is Excellent (20). The designers minimize use of the numerical figures, instead preferring adjectives like "Incredible" (36–45) and "Amazing" (46–62). A "Typical" (5–7) attribute has a 50% base chance for success at most tasks relating to that attribute. As an attribute increases, the chance of success increases about 5% per 10 points. Thus a character with an "Amazing" (50) attribute has a 75% chance of success at tasks relating to that attribute.

=== Superpowers and origins ===
Beyond the seven attributes, characters have superpowers that function on a mostly ad hoc basis, and each character's description gives considerable space to a description of how their powers work in the game.

Each character has an origin which puts ceilings on a character's abilities and superpowers. The origins include:

- Altered humans, normal people who acquire powers, such as Spider-Man or the Fantastic Four.
- High-tech wonders, normal people whose powers come from devices, such as Iron Man.
- Mutants, persons born with superpowers, such as the X-Men.
- Robots, created beings, such as the Vision and Ultron.
- Aliens, non-humans, including extra-dimensional beings such as Thor and Hercules.

=== Talents ===
The game also features a simple skill system referred to as Talents. Talents must be learned and cover areas of knowledge from Archery to Zoology. A Talent raises a character's ability by one rank when attempting actions related to that Talent. The GM is free to determine if a character would be unable to attempt an action without the appropriate Talent (such as a character with no medical background attempting to make a pill that can cure a rare disease).

== Game mechanics ==
Two primary game mechanics drive the game: column shifts and colored results. Both influence the difficulty of an action.

A column shift is used when a character is trying a hard or easy action. A column shift to the left indicates a penalty, while a shift to the right indicates a bonus.

The column for each ability is divided into four colors: white, green, yellow, and red. A white result is always a failure or unfavorable outcome. In most cases, getting a green result is all that is needed to succeed at a particular action. Yellow and red results usually indicate more favorable results that could knock back, stun, or even kill an opponent. However, the GM can determine that succeeding at a hard task might require a yellow or red result.

Additional rules in the "Campaign Book" of the basic and advanced sets use the same game mechanic to resolve non-violent tasks.

Cover of Marvel Super Heroes Advanced Set, art by Jeff Butler, 1986

== Publication history ==
The first super hero role-playing games appeared in the early 1980s: Supergame (1980) by DAG Productions, Champions (1981) by Hero Games and Villains and Vigilantes (1983) by Fantasy Games Unlimited. All of these were "generic" systems, not tied to any particular line of comics, and players had to create their own super heroes. TSR scored a coup in 1984 when it acquired the game license from Marvel Comics, allowing it to create a role-playing game and characters based on the popular line of comics. The result was Marvel Super Heroes, a boxed set designed by Jeff Grubb and written by Steve Winter. Grubb designed the game to be easily understood, including a bare-bones combat system sufficient to resolve comic book style superhero fights. The game proved popular, and two years later Grubb and Winter created an expanded edition, the Marvel Superheroes Advanced Game.

=== TSR game supplements ===
The original Marvel Super Heroes game received extensive support from TSR, covering a variety of Marvel Comics characters and settings, including a Gamer's Handbook of the Marvel Universe patterned after Marvel's Official Handbook of the Marvel Universe. MSH also got its own column, "The Marvel-phile", in TSR's house magazine Dragon; the column usually spotlighted a character or group of characters that hadn't yet appeared in a published game product.

=== SAGA System ===
In the late 1990s, TSR published Marvel Super Heroes Adventure Game, a card-based game that used their SAGA System game engine. This version, written by Mike Selinker, included a method of converting characters from the old role-playing game to the SAGA System. Though critically praised in various reviews at the time, it never reached a large market. Shortly afterwards, the Marvel Comics game license reverted to Marvel Comics.

=== Other games ===
In 2003, Marvel Comics published their own game, Marvel Universe Roleplaying Game. This game uses a diceless game mechanic that incorporates a Karma-based resolution system of "stones" (or tokens) to represent character effort. Subsequently Marvel Comics published a few additional supplements, but stopped supporting the game a little over a year after its initial release, despite going through several printings of the core rulebook.

In August 2011, Margaret Weis Productions acquired the licence to publish an RPG based on Marvel superheroes, and Marvel Heroic Roleplaying was released beginning in 2012. However, the company found that despite critical acclaim and two Origins Awards, Marvel Heroic Roleplaying: Civil War "didn't garner the level of sales necessary to sustain the rest of the line." so they brought the game to a close at the end of April 2013.

In June 2023, Matt Forbeck introduced the Marvel Multiverse Role-Playing Game, based on the "616" Role Playing system.

== Reception ==
In the July–August 1984 edition of Space Gamer (No. 70), Allen Varney wrote that the game was only suited to younger players and Marvel fanatics, saying, "this is a respectable effort, and an excellent introductory game for a devoted Marvel fan aged 10 to 12; older, more experienced, or less devoted buyers will probably be disappointed. 'Nuff said."

Seven years later, Varney revisited the game in the August 1991 edition of Dragon (Issue #172), reviewing the new basic set edition that had just been released. While Varney appreciated that the game was designed for younger players, he felt that it failed to recreate the excitement of the comics. "This is the gravest flaw of this system and support line: its apathy about recreating the spirit of Marvel stories. In this new Basic Set edition... you couldn’t find a miracle if you used microscopic vision. Look at this set’s few elementary mini-scenarios: all fight scenes. The four-color grandeur and narrative magic in the best Marvel stories are absent. Is this a good introduction to role-playing?" Varney instead suggested Toon by Steve Jackson Games or Ghostbusters by West End Games as better role-playing alternatives for new and beginning young players.

In the British RPG magazine Imagine, Pete Tamlyn commented "this game has been produced in collaboration with Marvel and that opportunity itself is probably worth a new game release. However, Marvel Superheroes is not just another Superhero game. In many ways it is substantially different from other SHrpgs."

In the January–February 1985 edition of Different Worlds (Issue #38), Troy Christensen gave it an average rating of 2.5 stars out of 4, saying, "The Marvel Super Heroes roleplaying game overall is a basic and simple system which I would recommend for beginning and novice players [...] People who enjoy a fast and uncomplicated game and like a system which is conservative and to the point will like this game."

In White Dwarf #62, Marcus L. Rowland gave the game an overall rating of 8 out of 10, saying "All in all, a useful system which is suitable for beginning players and referees, but should still suit experienced gamers."

In Issue 33 of Abyss, Lew Bryson liked the character generation system for "original heroes", calling the concept "Intriguing." And Bryson also liked the idea of Karma, but was not impressed by the idea of earning Karma by completing trivial, non-heroic activities. Bryson found good points in the combat system, but overall found the system too generic, pointing out "A handgun, any handgun, always does ten points of damage. I find that dull." Bryson found the production standards very good, but thought the art was "mediocre." Bryson concluded that the game was "one of the most patronizing, juvenile-oriented games I've ever seen ... The saving quality here, thank god, is that this game, as any game should, is flexible enough to allow real role-playing despite flaws in the rules."

In his 1990 book The Complete Guide to Role-Playing Games, game critic Rick Swan called this "a snap to learn, loaded with action, and nearly captures the anything-goes lunacy that's been a hallmark of Marvel Comics since the early 1960s." Swan did note that familiarity with Marvel heroes was a necessity "and players who've never heard of Captain America or the Fantastic Four (are there any?) won't find much to like." Swan concluded by giving the game superior rating of 3.5 out of 4, saying, "I believe it's more difficult to design a simple game than a complicated one, so Marvel Super Heroes strikes me as a triumph."

Marvel Super Heroes was chosen for inclusion in the 2007 book Hobby Games: The 100 Best. Writer and game designer Steve Kenson commented that "it's a testament to the game's longevity that it still has enthusiastic fan support on the Internet and an active play community more than a decade after its last product was published. Even more so that it continues to set a standard by which new superhero roleplaying games are measured. Like modern comic book writers and artists following the greats of the Silver Age, modern RPG designers have a tough act to follow."

In a retrospective review of Marvel Super Heroes in Black Gate, Matthew David Surridge said "you couldn't help but read comics differently when you were helping create super-hero adventures yourself. Which, so often, seemed superior to what was being published by the major publishers, especially in the early 1990s." Ty Johnston for Black Gate later said "I had the pleasure of playing the game a fair amount in my teen years and even a little later in my twenties, and more recently I lucked into a few online games with friends, and I have to say this game is not only enjoyable, but it's something of a bit of fresh air, mainly because of its relative simplicity and its willingness to be fun. It's worth checking out."

In his 2023 book Monsters, Aliens, and Holes in the Ground, RPG historian Stu Horvath noted, "It's interesting to see the gulf of quality between Marvel Super Heroes and Conan Unchained [published the same year by TSR.] Where Conan feels like the work of a good designer trying desperately to salvage a corporate cash grab, Marvel Super Heroes is a fun and functional reflection of the source material in roleplaying game form."

== Reviews ==
- Comics Feature #32
