= Lich (Dungeons & Dragons) =

Undead creature in "Dungeons & Dragons"

- Illustration of a lich by David A. Trampier from the 1st edition Monster Manual
- First appearance: Greyhawk (1975)

In-universe information
- Type: Undead
- Alignment: Any evil

The lich /lɪtʃ/ is an undead creature found in the Dungeons & Dragons (D&D) fantasy role-playing game. Liches are spellcasters who seek to defy death by magical means.

The term derives from lich, an archaic term for a corpse. Dungeons & Dragons co-creator Gary Gygax stated that he based the description of a lich included in the game on the short story "The Sword of the Sorcerer" (1969) by Gardner Fox.

== Publication history ==
The lich was one of the earliest creatures introduced in the Dungeons & Dragons game.

=== Dungeons & Dragons (1974–1976) ===
For the original D&D rule set, the lich was introduced in its first supplement, Greyhawk (1975). It is described simply as a skeletal monster that was formerly a magic-user or a magic-user/cleric in life and retains those abilities, able to send lower-level characters fleeing in fear.

The lich's interaction with the Psionics rules and the iconic lich Vecna were described in Supplement III: Eldritch Wizardry (1976).

=== Advanced Dungeons & Dragons 1st edition (1977–1988) ===
In AD&D 1st edition, the lich appears in the original Monster Manual (1977), where it is given more detailed description; including a brief, cryptic note of having reached "a non-human, non-living existence through force of will. It retains this status by certain conjurations, enchantments, and a phylactery." The nature and function of this phylactery was not explained, though the word exists in the real world, where phylactery has several meanings, including a box of Jewish prayer verses or Christian relics.

Len Lakofka's article "Blueprint for a Lich," in Dragon #26 (1979), describes a formula for transforming a spellcaster into a lich. This introduced the idea that the Lich stored its soul in a "jar", although the word phylactery was not used.

Another form of lich, the demilich, was introduced in Tomb of Horrors (1978) and later appeared in The Lost Caverns of Tsojcanth (1982) and then Monster Manual II (1983).

Endless Quest gamebook Lair of the Lich (1985) combines this phylactery and soul jar concept.

Detailed description of a Potion of Lichdom used to create liches was given in Lords of Darkness (1988). Though similar to the description in "Blueprint For a Lich", this version is described as preparing a "magical phylactery" rather than simply a "jar".

=== Dungeons & Dragons (1977–1989) ===
The D&D Basic Set included its own version of the lich, in the D&D Master Rules (1985), in the "Master DM's Book". This version has no mention of a device such as a phylactery, but can be a cleric. This entry was duplicated in the D&D Rules Cyclopedia (1991).

=== Advanced Dungeons & Dragons 2nd edition (1989–1999) ===
In AD&D 2nd edition, the lich and the demilich appear first in the Monstrous Compendium Volume One (1989), and are reprinted in the Monstrous Manual (1993). This version is explicitly described as storing its "life force" in a "phylactery".

The Spelljammer campaign setting accessory Lost Ships (1990) introduced the archlich, which also later appeared in the Monstrous Manual. The master lich appeared in Legend of Spelljammer (1991). A creature called the firelich is introduced in the 2nd Spelljammer Monstrous Compendium appendix (MC9).

The psionic lich for the Ravenloft campaign setting first appeared in Dragon #174 (October 1991), and then appeared in Van Richten's Guide to the Lich (1993), Ravenloft Monstrous Compendium Appendix III: Creatures of Darkness (1994), Monstrous Compendium Annual One (1994), and Van Richten's Monster Hunter's Compendium (1999). Several other lich variants were also introduced in the Ravenloft Monstrous Compendium Appendix III, including the defiler lich and demi-defiler lich, the drow lich (and the drow demilich, the drider lich, the drow priestess lich, and the drow wizard lich), and the elemental lich and demi-elemental lich.

The dracolich, a dragon lich, first appeared in the Monstrous Manual (1993).

The baelnorn, an elven lich of good alignment, was introduced in The Ruins of Myth Drannor (1993), and then appeared in Monstrous Compendium Annual Volume One (1994), and Cormanthyr: Empire of Elves (1998). The banelich, a version of the lich created by the god Bane in the Forgotten Realms campaign setting, first appear in the Ruins of Zhentil Keep boxed set (in the Monstrous Compendium booklet) in 1995, and then appears in the Monstrous Compendium Annual Volume Three (1996).

The Suel lich for the Greyhawk campaign setting was introduced in Polyhedron #101 (November 1994), and then appeared in Monstrous Compendium Annual Volume Two (1995).

A description of Potion of the Dracolich used to create Dracoliches was given in the Forgotten Realms Monstrous Compendium Appendix (1991). It was reprinted alongside the Potion of Lichdom in Encyclopedia Magica Volume III (1995).

The inheritor lich for the Red Steel campaign setting first appeared in Red Steel Savage Baronies (1995), and then in the Savage Coast Monstrous Compendium (1996).

=== Dungeons & Dragons 3rd edition (2000–2002) ===
In D&D 3rd edition, the lich appears in the Monster Manual as a template. This version describes the lich's phylactery as resembling a Jewish tefillin but notes it can also be a ring, amulet etc.

The banelich, as well as the good liches, the archlich and the baelnorn, appeared in Monsters of Faerun (2000).

The demilich appeared again in the Epic Level Handbook (2002).

=== Dungeons & Dragons version 3.5 (2003–2007) ===
In D&D version 3.5, the 3.0 entry for the lich is duplicated in the revised Monster Manual (2003).

The good lich and the lichfiend appeared in Libris Mortis: The Book of Undead (2004). The lichfiend also appeared in Dungeon #116 (November 2004), as part of The Shackled City Adventure Path.

The dry lich was introduced in Sandstorm: Mastering the Perils of Fire and Sand (2005).

The Suel lich returned in the "Campaign Classics" feature in Dragon #339 (January 2006).

=== Dungeons & Dragons 4th edition (2008–2014) ===
In D&D 4th edition, the lich appears in the Monster Manual (2008). This version describes the phylactery in similar terms to the 3e version, but without describing it as being wearable. A ritual is given which allows players to become liches. It also outlines the lich vestige, a weakened, ghostly lich that cannot re-form. The lich also appears as a template in the Dungeon Masters Guide (2008).

Rules in 4th edition allow a player to opt to become an arch-lich via an epic destiny found in Arcane Power.

=== Dungeons & Dragons 5th edition (2014–) ===
In D&D 5th edition, the lich appears in the Monster Manual (2014). This version of the lich is said to store its soul in a phylactery (every one of which is unique) which it feeds captured souls to sustain itself. The demilich and dracolich also appear.

== Description ==
A mage becomes a lich by means of necromancy, using a magical receptacle called a phylactery to store the lich's soul. A lich is emaciated in appearance. In some sources the method of becoming a lich is referred to as the Ritual of Becoming or Ceremony of Endless Night. The process is often described as requiring the subject to create and consume a deadly potion, the Elixir of Defilation, which is to be drunk on a full moon; although the exact details of the potion are described differently in various sources, the creation of the potion almost universally entails acts of utter evil, such as using as an ingredient the blood of an infant slain by the potential lich's own hand, or other, similarly vile components. The potion invariably kills the drinker but if the process is successful it rises again some days later as an undead Lich. Occasionally, this metamorphosis occurs by accident as a result of life-prolonging magic.

Unlike most other forms of undead creatures, the Lich retains all of the memories, personality, and abilities that it possessed in life — but it has a virtual eternity to hone its skills and inevitably becomes very powerful. Like other powerful forms of undead (such as a vampire or mummy), a Lich has unnatural powers owing to its state. For example, it can put mortals in a paralyzed state of hibernation with their minds, making them seem dead to others, and can, through its typically powerful magical spells, summon other lesser undead to protect it. A Lich's bones do not decay. The Lich is capable of sustaining tremendous physical damage, and is immune to disease, poison, fatigue and other effects that affect only the living. However, despite all its undead "gifts", a lich's most valuable resources are its vast intellect, its supreme mastery of sorcery and limitless time to research, plot and scheme.

Since a lich's soul is mystically tied to its phylactery, destroying its body will not kill it. Rather, its soul will return to the phylactery, and its body will be recreated by the power keeping it immortal. Thus the only way to permanently destroy a lich is to destroy the phylactery as well. Therefore, the lich will generally be extremely protective of the priceless item. The phylactery, which can be of virtually any form (the default form is a metal box filled with rune-covered papers, but it usually appears as a valuable amulet or gemstone), will often be hidden in a secret place and protected by powerful spells, charms, monsters and/or other servants; the phylactery itself is usually of magical nature, meaning its destruction will generally be no easier than obtaining it.

=== Alignment ===
Depending on the method of becoming a lich, a lich can be of any alignment, retaining whatever alignment it had in life.

The D&D version 3.5 Monster Manual, a core D&D rule book, emphatically states that liches are always evil, but there are references to good liches in other manuals. Good liches are presented in Monster Compendium: Monsters of Faerûn, a supplementary rule book for the D&D 3rd edition rules. Good liches differ in that they have sought undeath for a noble cause, to protect a place, a loved one, or to pursue an important quest. In a typical D&D campaign, liches are evil, power-hungry spell casters who have cheated death.

The AD&D Spelljammer accessory Lost Ships also introduced the good archlich, who are able to memorize spells through intuitive nature and do not need spellbooks. The archlich also does not become a demilich, but remains in its form for eternity. The fourth edition book Arcane Power includes the epic destiny archlich, which is intended for good, lawful good, or unaligned heroes. In the Forgotten Realms, arch-liches are liches from mortals who were divine casters of good alignment. Baelnorns are ancient elven liches who head noble families and aid communities through sage advice. While there are some records of these, they are extremely rare, and evil liches are far more prevalent. The abilities of good liches are somewhat diminished as well.

=== Variant liches ===
==== Demiliches ====
A demilich is an advanced form of lich that has sought other avenues to attain knowledge, turning away from the physical realm, using astral projection to travel across other planes of existence. Due to traveling across planes of existence, its body gradually deteriorates until only a skull or even a single skeletal hand remain, but stays a creature of enormous powers. Cracked.com author Tylor Linn included the demilich in his 2009 list of "The 15 Most Idiotic Monsters In Dungeons & Dragons History". He humorously commented that it "seems to possess no tactical advantages of any kind. It just kind of floats around, waiting for a party of heroes to smack it out of the air like a pinata." To the contrary it was rated 8th among the 10 strongest D&D creatures by Scott Baird from Screen Rant, saying "You might think that a floating skull would be easy to smash to pieces, but you would be wrong, as demiliches are some of the most resilient creatures in the game."

==== Non-human liches ====
Other races also have their own special versions of the lich, which are not necessarily evil; for example, an Elf from the Forgotten Realms setting can become a baelnorn (often elves who take upon themselves the duty of overseeing and/or protecting their house), or an Illithid can become an illithilich, also known as an alhoon. A dragon can also become a dracolich. Dracoliches are greatly feared, for they are far more powerful than ordinary liches. A dracolich that became a demilich would be an extremely powerful monster, even by dragon standards. Lichfiends are evil outsiders that achieve lichdom.

==== Other variant liches ====
Other variant liches exist. Baneliches, extremely powerful priests of the Forgotten Realms deity Bane, grow in power every 100 years of their continued existence. Dry liches are desert-dwelling liches, the end result of the Walker in the Wastes prestige class. Psiliches are powerful users of psionic powers, who have used non-magical means to achieve this state of undeath. The Suel Imperium also had its own form of liches, the Suel lich—powerful wizards who learned the secrets of transferring their souls from one body to the next—at the cost of the bodies burning out in brief periods.

== Notable liches ==
Liches are usually among the most powerful undead creatures in almost any setting in which they appear, and are one of the most powerful non-unique undead creatures in the D&D game.

=== Deities ===
Several D&D gods were liches before becoming deities; these gods include:

- The drow goddess Kiaransalee, from the Forgotten Realms campaign setting.
- Mellifleur the Lich-Lord: Non-campaign specific, this god was presented in Monster Mythology as the god of liches.
- Vecna from the Greyhawk campaign setting.
- Velsharoon, from the Forgotten Realms campaign setting.
- The githyanki lich-queen Vlaakith CLVII has been attempting to attain godhood.
- Erandis Vol, or Lady Vol to her worshippers, in the Eberron campaign setting.

=== Non-divine liches ===
- Acererak, of the World of Greyhawk campaign setting.
- Alokkair Wizard-King - the lich who lived under Shadowdale, once possessed own kingdom of Hlonagh in the desert of Anauroch
- Arklem Greeth, Arcane Archmage of the Forgotten Realms setting.
- Asberdies, resident of the sunken cave in module D1 Descent into the Depths of the Earth.
- Aumvor the Undying appears in the Forgotten Realms book, Champions of Ruin (2005).
- Azalin, the lord of Darkon in the Ravenloft campaign setting.
- Boretti, Necromancer-King, ruler of a rogue army in Acheron, from Planescape: Planes of Law manual.
- Dragotha, powerful dracolich in the World of Greyhawk campaign setting.
- Dregoth, 3rd Champion of Rajaat, 'Ravager of Giants', Sorcerer-King of Giustenal in the Dark Sun campaign setting.
- Harthoon, chief diplomat and castellan of Orcus (from the Book of Vile Darkness and Fiendish Codex I: Hordes of the Abyss).
- Larloch the Last, last Netheril arcanist from the Forgotten Realms setting.
- Skall, factol (leader) of the Dustmen faction in the Planescape setting.
- Szass Tam, the de facto ruler of Thay in the Forgotten Realms campaign setting.
- Thessalar, of the World of Greyhawk campaign setting. Creator of the thessalmonster.
- Redeye, the lich that rules over the Lizard Marsh. Appeared in the adventure module Under Illefarn.
- Sammaster, First Speaker of the Cult of the Dragon in the Forgotten Realms setting.
- Tordynnar Rhaevaern, baelnorn from the Forgotten Realms setting.
- The Twisted Rune Lords: Jymahna, Kartak Spellseer, Priamon Rakesk, Rhangaun, Sapphiraktar the Azure (dracolich), and Shangalar the Black, all from the Forgotten Realms campaign setting.
- Erandis Vol, nearly a deity. The driving force behind the Blood of Vol religion. Eberron campaign setting.
- The Witch-King Zhengyi, from The Bloodstone Pass modules (particularly H4 Throne of Bloodstone) and the last two books of The Sellswords trilogy by R.A. Salvatore.
- Zrie Prakis, subordinate and former lover of the wizard Cassana in the novel Azure Bonds.

=== Notable liches in other Dungeons & Dragons related media ===
- Belpheron, a powerful lich who almost succeeded in conquering Toril, and who forms much of the backstory of Neverwinter Nights: Shadows of Undrentide. He makes a cameo appearance in Neverwinter Nights: Hordes of the Underdark.
- Deimos, the final boss in Dungeons & Dragons: Tower of Doom.
- Kangaxx, from Baldur's Gate II: Shadows of Amn, a hidden quest battle.
- Klaxx the Malign, from Dungeons & Dragons: Wrath of the Dragon God.
- Lyran, from Baldur's Gate: Dark Alliance II.
- Karlat, a mage who sacrificed the children of Charwood Village to Belial the Fire Lord to gain lichdom in Neverwinter Nights.
- Heurodis the Medusa sacrificed her eyes (and thus her Flesh-to-Stone Gaze) to become a lich in Neverwinter Nights: Shadows of Undrentide. The mythal empowering Undrentide served as her phylactery.
- Vix'thra, the dracolich that was the final boss of the undead section of Neverwinter Nights: Hordes of the Underdark.
- Rammaq, a titan turned demilich from Neverwinter Nights 2: Mask of the Betrayer.
- Vongoethe, from Baldur's Gate II: Throne of Bhaal.
- Xykon, from The Order of the Stick.

== Reception ==
Josh Hrala, for Geek & Sundry, reported that "liches really took off in modern gaming and fiction when D&D co-creator Gary Gygax officially added it to the game back in 1975 in the supplement called Greyhawk. Gygax wasn't the first person to conceive the idea of a lich, though. Instead, he lifted most of the idea from a short story from the late-1960s by fantasy author Gardner Fox". Henry Glasheen, in his review of the Monster Manual (2014) for SLUG Magazine, wrote that "Fifth Edition has taken some of its most imposing creatures and given them an undeniable ambience" and highlighted the lich as an example monster that would use "her whole lair in a desperate attempt to annihilate the party".

Rob Bricken of io9 named the lich as the 7th most memorable D&D monster, while Backstab reviewer Philippe Tessier called it a "classic of D&D". In 2018, SyFy Wire called it one of "The 9 Scariest, Most Unforgettable Monsters From Dungeons & Dragons", saying that "Liches are classic monsters not just in D&D, but when you face one in the tabletop game you better be ready for a tough fight and more." CBR, similarly in 2018, called it one of the "13 Most Powerful D&D Monsters", saying that "they are immortal spellcasters who are almost impossible to kill seeing as you need to locate their Phylactery and destroy it. That's not something the Lich will just let a party do without some trouble, which makes a Lich one of the deadliest monsters in the game".

Eric Silver, for Alma, criticized the use of the word phylactery in the game and highlighted talisman as a more neutral term. Silver wrote, "I don't know about you, but phylactery is a word I've only ever seen used as the English translation of the Jewish ritual object, tefillin. The phylactery is specifically described as 'a charm or amulet, or repository used to store small parchments bearing holy scripture or arcane writings.' [...] Even stranger, the lich was created by Gygax, someone fascinated with historical religious study. He made the choice that an undead wizard king would keep his soul in something that Jews use for daily prayers. Recent editions backtrack from those origins, but Wizards has stuck with 'phylactery.' They bury the Jewish coding of the lich, but much like the lich itself, allow it to live on".

== In popular culture ==
=== Other publishers ===
- The lich is fully detailed in Paizo Publishing's book Undead Revisited (2011), on pages 22–27. In 2021, Paizo ceased using the word "phylactery" in Pathfinder Second Edition; instead, liches use a "soul cage" to contain their souls in a physical object.
- A lich appears in Judges Guild publications The Book of Ruins page 20, The Final Refuge of Allmark.
- A lich is also the fate of one of the wizards among other forms of undead in Judges Guild module Citadel of Fire.
- The Lich King is an Icon (a powerful NPC archetype) in 13th Age.

=== Television ===
- The animated television series Adventure Time "borrows heavily from the tabletop role-playing game Dungeons & Dragons ... including monsters both minor (a gelatinous cube) and major (the Lich)".
