= Spelljammer: Adventures in Space =

5th Edition Dungeons and Dragons boxed set

- The cover of the digital D&D Beyond edition. Art by Bruce Brenneise, Justin Gerard, and Ekaterina Burmak
- Rules required: Dungeons & Dragons, 5th edition
- Character levels: 5–8
- Campaign setting: Spelljammer
- Lead designers: Christopher Perkins
- Authors: Astral Adventurer's Guide: Christopher Perkins; Jeremy Crawford; Ari Levitch; Light of Xaryxis: Justice Ramin Arman; Sadie Lowry; Jeffrey Ludwig; Boo's Astral Menagerie: Christopher Perkins
- First published: August 16, 2022
- Pages: 64 per book
- ISBN: 9780786968169

Spelljammer: Adventures in Space is a boxed set for the 5th edition of the Dungeons & Dragons fantasy role-playing game. The boxed set includes three sourcebooks: the Astral Adventurer's Guide (a Spelljammer campaign setting guide), the Light of Xaryxis (an adventure module), and Boo's Astral Menagerie (a bestiary of Wildspace and Astral Sea creatures). It was published by Wizards of the Coast and released on August 16, 2022.

== Contents ==
Spelljammer: Adventures in Space is a campaign and adventure boxed set for using the Spelljammer setting in the 5th edition. It contains three 64-page sourcebooks, a Dungeon Master's screen, and a poster map of the asteroid-city Rock of Bral.

The three sourcebooks expand on game elements for the 5th edition, such as:

Astral Adventurer's Guide

- Six new player races – Astral Elf, Autognome, Giff, Hadozee, Plasmoid, and Thri-Kreen
- Spelljamming ships – sixteen ship stat blocks
- Updated mechanics on Spelljamming, air envelopes, gravity planes, the Astral Plane and magic
- A guide to the asteroid-city Rock of Bral

Boo's Astral Menagerie

- A bestiary that includes 72 Wildspace and Astral Sea creature stat blocks

Light of Xaryxis

- An adventure module which mixes classic science fiction and high-seas themes
- The module is broken into "episodes, each of which ends in a cliffhanger"
- It is designed to take player characters from 5th level to 8th level

== Publication history ==
Standard edition of Spelljammer: Adventures in Space which includes a map of Rock of Bral, Dungeon Master's Screen, three sourcebooks and a slipcase.

The Spelljammer campaign setting was introduced in 1989 with a boxed set, similarly titled Spelljammer: AD&D Adventures in Space, for Advanced Dungeons & Dragons 2nd Edition. In April 2022, Wizards of the Coast announced a new boxed set titled Spelljammer: Adventures in Space which was released on August 16, 2022; this release updates the Spelljammer setting for the 5th edition of Dungeons & Dragons. Chris de Hoog, for CGMagazine, commented that "it's been about thirty years since the last officially published material in this realm, and since acquiring the game in 1997 Wizards of the Coast has only alluded to aspects of it sparingly".

The box set includes three 64-page hardcover books: Astral Adventurer's Guide (a Dungeon Master guide), Boo's Astral Menagerie (a bestiary), and Light of Xaryxis (an adventure module). On the decision to release Spelljammer: Adventures in Space as boxed set with three sourcebooks, lead designer Chris Perkins said, "Spelljammer has always been a bit of a weirdo. And so we felt like this was a great opportunity to play around with the form factor". "Perkins also noted that Spelljammer: Adventures in Space had a higher art budget than any other Dungeons & Dragons 5E product, which allowed for 'lavish illustrations' in all three books".

=== Editions ===
The standard edition has cover art by three different artists – Astral Adventurer's Guide cover art is by Bruce Brenneise, Boo's Astral Menagerie cover art is by Justin Gerard, and Light of Xaryxis cover art is by Ekaterina Burmak. The standard Dungeon Master's Screen features a Wildspace scene with art by Julian Koch. An alternate art edition, with cover art of all three books by Hydro74, was released for sale in local hobby and game shops. The alternate Dungeon Master's Screen features an Astral Sea scene with art by Jedd Chevrier. The contents of the two editions are otherwise identical. Spelljammer: Adventures in Space was also released as a digital product through the following Wizards of the Coast licensees: D&D Beyond, Fantasy Grounds, and Roll20.

Beadle & Grimm, another Wizards of the Coast licensee, is scheduled to release a special edition titled Spelljammer: Adventures in Space – Platinum Edition in October 2022. It will include the three sourcebooks as softcovers, an additional booklet of adventure encounters, pre-generated characters, game cards (for encounters, ships, magic items and spells), various maps and miniatures, physical props, and other handouts. Beadle & Grimm will also release a Silver Edition at a lower price point; this edition will include fewer items than the Platinum Edition.

=== Errata ===
On September 2, 2022, Wizards of the Coast issued an apology for offensive material included in Spelljammer: Adventures in Space. This content was removed from digital editions and will be removed from future print editions; errata was also released. Charlie Hall, for Polygon, wrote that this "apology is in reference to a race called the hadozee [...]. The primatelike creatures were called out for their association with in-fiction slavery, as well as problematic themes and images that together serve to reinforce racism against Black people".

Following this apology, Christopher Perkins – Wizards' game design architect – announced a new inclusion review process for the Dungeons & Dragons studio in November 2022. This process will now require "every word, illustration, and map" to be reviewed at several steps in development "by multiple outside cultural consultants prior to publication". The previous process only included cultural consultants at the discretion of the product lead for a project. All products being reprinted will also go through this new review process and be updated as needed.

== Related products ==
=== Miniatures ===
As part of their Icons of the Realm line, Wizards of the Coast licensee WizKids released 47 pre-painted miniatures that correspond with the Spelljammer setting. They also released two gargantuan figures – an astral dreadnought and Prince Xeleth (a character from Light of Xaryxis) on top of an adult solar dragon.

=== Spelljammer Academy ===
Spelljammer Academy is an introductory adventure module released on D&D Beyond. It acts as a prequel and teaser for Spelljammer: Adventures in Space. The module is designed to take player characters from 1st level to 5th level; 5th level is the starting level for Light of Xaryxis. Spelljammer Academy was released in four parts from July 2022 to August 2022. It was a free promotion which could only be claimed by D&D Beyond users, however, it was also a time-limited promotion and could not be claimed after August 16, 2022.

=== Spelljams ===
Wizards of the Coast released a soundtrack, titled Spelljams, for Spelljammer: Adventures in Space digitally on August 16, 2022; "each song on Spelljams corresponds with a chapter in the" adventure module Light of Xaryxis. Four different themed physical two-disk LP vinyl records were also released.

The Decemberists guitarist Chris Funk, who plays Dungeons & Dragons with some of his band mates, had previously contacted Wizards of the Coast as someone interested in the musical aspect of Dungeons & Dragons. This led to Perkins reaching out to Funk to produce the album. On the development of the album, Funk said

Chris Perkins and I started coming up with the idea that [we would pick select] bands to write a song inspired by each chapter from the [game] module. We gave the bands a Cliff Notes version of each chapter. They were like: ‘Is this for a video game or a commercial?' We said: ‘No, you are just using the [Spelljammer chapters] world as a song prompt.' Everybody was like, top to bottom: 'This is the most fun I've had writing a song in a long time.'

Charlie Hall, for Polygon, wrote that "even if you don't pick up or play the campaign, there's something excellent in here for everyone who loves music. The album opens with a moody synth track from Magic Sword, transitions into a theremin-and-thrash-metal song from Osees, before Reggie Watts channels David Hasselhoff doing a William Shatner impression in 'Space Is A Place'". Tony Dehner of Iowa Public Radio similarly noted that "there truly is a little something for everyone on Spelljams, with a variety of musical styles represented, and every song here fits". Dehner noted that album "vibe is very similar" to the Guardians Of The Galaxy movie soundtracks "where space adventures are accompanied by classic rock, mostly of the '60s & '70s", along with "a couple of ass-kicking heavy metal songs". He also highlighted that "few songs make direct reference to the Spelljammer setting" and "you don't need to be a D&D player, or have any understanding of what Spelljammer is, to enjoy" the album. On the Flash Gordon (1980) inspiration for the boxed set, Eric Diaz of Nerdist commented that "yes, the one with the awesome theme song by Queen. Spelljammer is an over-the-top space opera where the players have to fight to save their home planet from an evil Elven Empire that wishes to destroy it. Just like the Queen score was crucial to Flash Gordon, the Spelljammer: Adventures in Space soundtrack is just as crucial to the game".

== Reception ==
Chris de Hoog, for CGMagazine, rated Spelljammer: Adventures in Space a 9.5/10 and called the development team's choice to split the material over three sourcebooks a "wise move". On Boo's Astral Menagerie, de Hoog wrote that it "has one of the most bizarre rosters of enemies to date, from more mundane threats like solar and lunar dragons or combatant versions of the new playable races; to spacefaring variants of aquatic creatures; straight through to Lovecraftian horrors". The Light of Xaryxis adventure module impressed him the most, especially with the adventure's layout and structure. de Hoog commented that "on one hand, there's more material in the setting guide than some recent books, which came as a pleasant surprise; on the other, I was still craving more background from Spelljammer: Adventures in Space. It presents an excellent hub for your space-faring adventures, the Rock of Bral, and enough inspiration for DMs to shape their own version of the astral realms to their campaigns [...]. All told, Spelljammer: Adventures in Space passed the ultimate final test of any D&D product: when I put it down, I immediately reached out to my friends to rave about it and schedule our first foray into Wildspace".

Samantha Nelson, for Polygon, called Light of Xaryxis "a zany space opera" inspired by Flash Gordon and commented on the episodic nature of the module where each chapter is "meant to be run as a two- to three-hour session". Nelson highlighted the balanced encounters of the module and that "almost every challenge in Light of Xaryxis comes with text on what happens if the players fail — and those setbacks often have extremely entertaining results. [...] These suggestions help change the nature of conflict in the game [...]. Light of Xaryxis normalizes failure as just a key part of the narrative". While she didn't consider the module "perfect", Nelson wrote that Light of Xaryxis is an "excellent introduction to Spelljammer" and that the Astral Adventurer's Guide can also provide "plenty of ways to extend your Spelljammer adventure beyond Light of Xaryxis".

Christian Hoffer, for ComicBook.com, wrote that "not only does the boxed set reinvent the popular Flash Gordon-esque space setting originally introduced in 1989, but it also brings some very strange new player options that are well beyond what's normally associated with the high fantasy at the heart of most Dungeons & Dragons campaigns. [...] The Autognomes and the hippopotamus-like Giff were long associated with the Spelljammer setting, while the Hadozee, Thri-Kreen, and Plasmoids were all 're-skins' of races from the TSR RPG Star Frontiers that were eventually brought into Spelljammer". Hoffer highlighted a "noticeable departure from past lore" is that the crystal sphere system has "been replaced by the Astral Sea, a key component of D&D's current cosmology". Hoffer commented on the "ocean and seafaring themes" along with the space themes and wrote that the sixteen included ships are a "mix of weird spaceships like nightspiders and nautiloids and traditional ships like galleons, complete with their own sails and masts".

Andrew Stretch, for TechRaptor, commented that splitting the content into three separate books "improves table dynamics" as it creates a clear delineation between content for players and content for Dungeon Masters. Stretch wrote that "while navel ship combat isn't new to Dungeons & Dragons 5th Edition there are a few more intricacies with the Spelljammer ships including some very out there mechanics that you'll need to learn. Each ship gets to act as its own point of gravity when up in the Astral Sea and even create its own envelope of breathable air". He highlighted the expansive bestiary and that it encourages Dungeon Masters "to take what might already be a favorite monster [...] and turn it into a Spelljammer-worthy enemy". Stretch stated that "the complete collection of Spelljammer isn't just a good Dungeons & Dragons adventure, but for a group of players that high fantasy might not be their jam is a great hopping on point. The adventure isn't going to span years and it's a strong story filled with memorable characters and big story moments".

=== Hadozee ===
Eris Currier-Mead, for CBR, wrote that the 2nd Edition Hadozee were "a people without an origin. Their society didn't place heavy value on history, so their cultural memory focused only on their current existence as sailors, whether that be of the stars or the sea. They were described as giving little consideration to ethics and morals and looking forward to their shipboard tasks and chores"; however, Spelljammer: Adventures in Space changed their origin "to now have a definitive backstory" with a wizard's experiments turning them a sellable intelligent army. Currier-Mead commented that "fans argued that a race of sapient apes who were granted intelligence by an outsider who enslaved them, experimented on them and intended to sell them hits too many racist notes. [...] Even the elevating to sapience by an outside force has been compared by fans to many racist myths, as well as the white and colonial savior archetypes".

Charlie Hall, for Polygon, highlighted an offensive passage on the Hadozee player race, "a spacefaring mammal that looks like a primate," which "fans on social media have been pointing out the parallels to the Black experience, and the history of slavery in the United States and abroad [...]. Critics have also found images in the book that hearken back to racist minstrel shows". Hall stated that Hadozee were brought into the original Spelljammer setting from TSR's Star Frontiers (1982); when digging into the older published content, "things really go off the rails, with additional background information about the hadozee evoking many other racist stereotypes of Black people". Hall highlighted that Wizards of the Coast had previously taken steps towards more inclusivity and had altered parts of 5th Edition to reduce racial stereotypes. He wrote that "following those progressive actions, many fans, as well as other tabletop game designers, have been vocal in their criticism of Wizards' choice to reintroduce the hadozee in this way".

Chase Carter, for Dicebreaker, highlighted the minstrel show nature of the Hadozee artwork and stated that "the original text provided an origin for the Hadozee that begins with a wizard magically uplifting them to sapience in order to sell them as warrior slaves". Carter wrote that "some of those who called out the racist Hadozee depiction asked why no cultural consultants were hired to consult on a setting with explicit slavery and plenty of allusions to real-world colonial time periods (none of the Spelljammer books list consultants in their credits). Others postulated that either no sensitivity readers were brought on to the project, or else Wizards of the Coast chose to ignore them. Such processes might be addressed in the 'thorough internal review' Wizards cited in its apology, but heavy scepticism is understandable given the company's apparent inaction over the last two years".
