= Nightmares of Futures Past =

- Cover art by John Statema and Mike Machlan
- Designers: Steve Winter
- Publishers: TSR
- Publication: 1987
- Genres: Super Hero RPG
- Systems: Marvel Super Heroes

Nightmares of Futures Past is a supplement published by TSR in 1987 for the superhero role-playing game Marvel Super Heroes that describes a new dystopian setting.

== Description ==
Nightmares of Futures Past is a supplement for the Advanced rules featuring the X-Men that describes a bleak alternate future where mutants are hunted down by huge robot Sentinels and imprisoned in concentration camps. As critic James Wallis noted, in a change from most Marvel Super Heroes adventures, the player characters are not fighting crime but fighting for their lives.

Although the book describes this new world, with background, maps, non-player characters and tips for the gamemaster, it does not contain any adventures for this setting.

== Publication history ==
TSR acquired a role-playing game license from Marvel Comics, and produced Marvel Super Heroes in 1984, as well as dozens of supplements and adventures over the next five years.

One of these supplements was MX1 Nightmares of Futures Past, a 32-page softcover book published in 1987 with map and outer cover, written by Steve Winter with a cover by John Statema and Mike Machlan.

TSR subsequently published three adventures for this setting the following year: The X-Potential, Reap the Whirlwind, and Flames of Doom.

== Reception ==
Writing in Issue 11 of Adventurer, James Wallis hailed this adventure as "the sort of module that makes you think twice about a game." Wallis warned readers that this turned the super-hero genre on its head: "The major differences between Nightmare and normal [Marvel Super Heroes] (or indeed any superhero game) is that the characters will be universally hated and distrusted, and there is nowhere that is safe ... This adds an edge of danger, excitement and depth that I find lacking in normal superhero games." Wallis concluded, "it's an excellent background pack for anyone who's grown a little tired of the 'Wham!', 'Pow!', 'Biff!' school of superheroics and is looking for a change. Top marks, TSR."
