= Reap the Whirlwind (adventure) =

Super hero role-playing game adventure

- Cover art by John Statema, Jeff Butler, and Les Dorscheid
- Designers: Caroline Spector and Warren Spector
- Publishers: TSR
- Publication: 1987
- Genres: Super hero RPG
- Systems: Marvel Super Heroes

Reap the Whirlwind is an adventure published by TSR in 1987 for the Marvel Super Heroes role-playing game. It is the second in a dystopian trilogy called "Future in Flames."

== Description ==
Reap the Whirlwind is the second adventure in a X-Men trilogy for the Advanced rules that is set in a bleak alternate future where mutants — the player characters — are hunted down by huge robot Sentinels and imprisoned in concentration camps.

As critic James Wallis noted, in a change from most Marvel Super Heroes adventures, the player characters are not fighting crime but fighting for their lives.

In Reap the Whirlwind, the player characters must find and free a mutant woman whose power allows her to mask her mutant abilities as well as the abilities of mutants near her from Sentinels. The woman, Gilda Ginsel, was accidentally captured by a Sentinel and is being sent to a research facility where her power will be unmasked unless she is rescued. Once the player characters have freed Gilda, they must make take her to the relative safety of Canada via an Underground Railway, where they will meet up with Nick Fury and Wolverine. They are then taken to the Canadian headquarters of Stark Enterprises, and have to fight off a cross-border raid by Sentinels.

Reap the Whirlwind also contains a mini-adventure where the player characters join a mutant army in Texas to attack and overwhelm the local Sentinels.

== Publication history ==
TSR acquired a role-playing game license from Marvel Comics, and produced Marvel Super Heroes in 1984, as well as dozens of supplements and adventures over the next five years.

One of these supplements was MX1 Nightmares of Futures Past, which introduced a dark and dystopian alternate world setting for the "Future in Flames" series.

TSR subsequently published three adventures for this setting the following year: The X-Potential, Reap the Whirlwind, and Flames of Doom.

MX3 Reap the Whirlwind is a 32-page book with a large color map, and an outer folder. It was written by Caroline Spector and Warren Spector, with cover art by John Statema, Jeff Butler, and Les Dorscheid, interior art by John Statema and Mark Nelson, and cartography by Dave "Diesel" LaForce. The adventure was published by TSR in 1987.

== Reception ==
In The Complete Guide to Role-Playing Games, Rick Swan recommended Reap the Whirlwind and the entire "Future in Flames" series as an excellent introduction to the super hero genre, but warned that these adventures were for "ambitious players."
