= Nigel Findley =

Canadian writer and game designer

Nigel D. Findley
- Born: July 22, 1959; Venezuela
- Died: February 19, 1995 (aged 35); Vancouver, British Columbia, Canada
- Occupations: Writer, game designer
- Writing career
- Genres: Role-playing games, fantasy, science fiction

Nigel D. Findley (July 22, 1959 – February 19, 1995) was a Canadian game designer, editor, and an author of science fiction and fantasy novels and role-playing games (RPGs).

== Biography ==
Nigel Findley was born in Venezuela in 1959 to Canadian parents, and lived in Spain, Nigeria, the United States, and England before moving with his family to Vancouver in 1969.

Although Findley started his career in business, in the mid-1980s he began to design games and write RPG articles and adventures for publication in his spare time. He was successful enough that in 1990, he decided to become a full-time freelance writer, and eventually authored or co-authored twelve novels as well as over one hundred other publications. He wrote material for many game companies, including fantasy role-playing adventures and supplements for TSR, Shadowrun supplements and fiction for FASA, Role Aids supplements for Mayfair, The Primal Order for Wizards of the Coast, and various works for West End Games and White Wolf Publishing. He is credited with parts of the design of Greyhawk Adventures and Fate of Istus, and was the sole author of Greyspace.

RPG historian Shannon Appelcline noted that Findley's Shadowrun adventure The Universal Brotherhood (1990) was particularly well received.

== Awards ==
- Findley won a 1992 Origins Award for GURPS Illuminati.
- In 1994 Findley was inducted into the Origins Awards Hall of Fame.

== Death ==
Findley died at home in Vancouver from a sudden heart attack on February 19, 1995, at the age of 35.

== Legacy ==
- Following his death, the Origins Awards instituted the "Nigel D. Findley Memorial Award" for best role-playing product of the year. The award was given out between 1995 and 2001. Castle Falkenstein was the first recipient; The Lord of the Rings Trading Card Game was the final winner.
- Lisa Smedman, editorial director of Vancouver RPG magazine Adventures Unlimited wrote, "If a novel had his name on it, readers could be guaranteed that it was fast-paced, fun, and action-packed. If an adventure bore his byline, players could be assured of Machiavellian plot twists, innovative settings, and authentically motivated characters ... Those of us who worked with him directly or knew him as a friend can testify to his easygoing nature, his willingness to work with others, his refusal to brag about his many accomplishments and his generosity of spirit."

== Bibliography ==
=== Advanced Dungeons & Dragons ===
- Dragon magazine
  - "The Ecology of the Peryton" (February 1984, Dragon issue #82)
  - "The Ecology of the Will-o-Wisp" (July 1985, Dragon issue #99)
  - "The Ecology of the Greenhag" (September 1987, Dragon issue #125)
  - "The Ecology of the Gibbering Mouther" (August 1990, Dragon issue #160)
  - "The Mind of the Vampire" (October 1990, Dragon issue #162)
  - "Picture This!" (March 1992, Dragon issue 179)
- Dungeon magazine
  - "Caermor" (November 1986, Dungeon issue 2)
  - "Nightshade" (September 1987, Dungeon issue 7)
  - "Light of Lost Souls" (July 1988, Dungeon issue 12)
  - "A Question of Balance" (November 1988, Dungeon issue 14)
  - "Necropolis" (March 1989, Dungeon issue 16)
  - "The Serpent's Tooth" (September 1989, Dungeon issue 19)
  - "White Fang" (November 1989, Dungeon issue 20)
- All game worlds
  - The Castle Guide (1990 sourcebook, ISBN 0-88038-837-4) Design
  - Tome of Magic (1991 sourcebook, ISBN 1-56076-107-5) Design
  - Dungeons of Despair (1999 adventure, ISBN 0-7869-1444-0) Coauthor
- Forgotten Realms
  - Draconomicon (1990 sourcebook, ISBN 0-88038-876-5)
  - Ninja Wars (1990 adventure, ISBN 0-88038-895-1)
  - Cult of the Dragon, FR (1998, ISBN 0-7869-0709-6) Additional/original design
- Greyhawk
  - Greyhawk Adventures (1988 sourcebook, ISBN 0-88038-649-5) Additional design
  - Fate of Istus (1989 adventure, ISBN 0-88038-712-2) Coauthor
- Lankhmar
  - Thieves of Lankhmar (1990 adventure, ISBN 0-88038-825-0)
- Ravenloft
  - Van Richten's Guide to Vampires (1991 sourcebook, ISBN 1-56076-151-2)
  - Van Richten's Guide to Werebeasts (1993 sourcebook, ISBN 1-56076-633-6)
  - Both reprinted in Van Richten's Monster Hunter's Compendium: Volume One (1999, ISBN 0-7869-1447-5)
- Spelljammer
  - Skull & Crossbows (1990 adventure, ISBN 0-88038-845-5)
  - Practical Planetology (1991 sourcebook, ISBN 1-56076-134-2)
  - Into the Void (1991 novel, ISBN 1-56076-154-7)
  - Greyspace (1992 sourcebook, ISBN 1-56076-348-5) crossover with Greyhawk
  - The Broken Sphere (1993 novel, ISBN 1-56076-596-8)
- Role Aids (unlicensed books published by Mayfair Games)
  - Witches (1990 sourcebook, ISBN 0-923763-24-4)
  - Psionics (1991 sourcebook, ISBN 0-923763-31-7)
  - To Hell and Back, Realms of Fantasy (1993 boxed set, ISBN 0-923763-62-7)
  - Seed of Darkness (1993 novel, ISBN 0-923763-78-3)

=== Shadowrun ===
- Sourcebooks
  - The Universal Brotherhood (1990, ISBN 1-55560-024-7)
  - Paranormal Animals of North America (1990, ISBN 1-55560-123-5)
  - The Neo-Anarchist's Guide to North America (1991, ISBN 1-55560-135-9) "Quebec and Quebec City"
  - Native American Nations, Volume One (1991, ISBN 1-55560-130-8)
  - Native American Nations, Volume Two (1991, ISBN 1-55560-158-8)
  - The Neo-Anarchists' Guide to Real Life (1992, ISBN 1-55560-165-0)
  - Shadowrun, Second Edition (1992, ISBN 1-55560-180-4) Additional Material
  - Tir Tairngire (1993, ISBN 1-55560-197-9)
  - Corporate Shadowfiles (1993, ISBN 1-55560-211-8)
  - Lone Star (1994, ISBN 1-55560-230-4)
  - Denver: The City of Shadows (1994, ISBN 1-55560-236-3) with Tom Dowd and Tom Wong
  - Aztlan (1995, ISBN 1-55560-257-6)
  - Underworld Sourcebook (1997, ISBN 1-55560-315-7) Concepts
  - Shadowrun Gamemaster Screen: "Critters" (1998, ISBN 1-55560-369-6) Other original design
- Adventures
  - One Stage Before (1992, ISBN 1-55560-192-8)
  - Paradise Lost (1994, ISBN 1-55560-227-4) with Tom Wong
  - Double Exposure (1994, ISBN 1-55560-240-1) with Fraser Cane
  - Harlequin's Back (1994, ISBN 1-55560-248-7) "Aftermath" and Story Development
  - "Denver Double Cross" (Spring 1995, Adventures Unlimited, issue #1)
- Novels
  - 2XS (1991, ISBN 0-451-45139-2)
  - Shadowplay (1993, ISBN 0-451-45228-3)
  - Lone Wolf (1994, ISBN 0-451-45272-0)
  - House of the Sun (1995, ISBN 0-451-45370-0)

=== Other RPGs ===
- Battletech: Virtual World
  - No Limits (1996 novel, ISBN 0-451-45525-8)
- Bloodshadows
  - Padarr Citybook (1995 sourcebook, ISBN 0-87431-385-6)
  - Fires of Marl (1995 sourcebook, ISBN 0-87431-388-0) Additional Material
- Buck Rogers XXVC
  - Phases of the Moon (1991 adventure, ISBN 1-56076-095-8)
- Chill
  - Horrors of North America (1991 sourcebook, ISBN 0-923763-41-4)
  - Voodoo (1992 sourcebook, ISBN 0-923763-53-8)
- Earthdawn
  - Denizens of Earthdawn Volume Two (1993 sourcebook, ISBN 1-55560-237-1)
  - The Adept's Way (1995 sourcebook, ISBN 1-55560-260-6) Coauthor
  - Lost Kaer (1998 novel, ISBN 1-55560-274-6)
- GURPS
  - GURPS Illuminati (1992 sourcebook, ISBN 1-55634-223-3)
  - "Playing With Your Mind, Secret Knowledge from GURPS Illuminati" (April 1992, Roleplayer issue 28)
  - Supporting Cast (1993 sourcebook, ISBN 1-55634-267-5) with Fraser Cain
  - Warehouse 23 (1997 sourcebook, ISBN 1-55634-328-0) Additional Material
- The Primal Order
  - Pawns: The Opening Move (1992 sourcebook, ISBN 1-880992-08-6)
  - Knights: Strategies in Motion (1993 sourcebook, ISBN 1-880992-10-8)
- Star Wars: The Roleplaying Game
  - Planet of the Mists (1992 adventure, ISBN 0-87431-122-5)
  - Goroth: Slave of the Empire (1995 supplement, ISBN 0-87431-250-7)
  - "Forbidden Fruit" (Summer 1995, Adventures Unlimited, issue #2)
- Storytelling System
  - The Succubus Club (1991 adventure, ISBN 1-56504-011-2) Coauthor
  - "Raiko" (February 1992, White Wolf, issue #30)
  - Awakening: Diablerie Mexico (1992 adventure, ISBN 1-56504-018-X)
    - Reprinted in the Diablerie compilation (1997, ISBN 1-56504-238-7)
  - Dark Alliance: Vancouver (1993 sourcebook, ISBN 1-56504-059-7) with Geoff McMartin
  - Street Fighter Player's Guide (1994 rulebook, ISBN 1-56504-550-5) Additional Writing
  - Chicago Chronicles Vol. 1 (1996 sourcebook, ISBN 1-56504-219-0) Coauthor
- Torg
  - Kanawa Personal Weapons (1991 sourcebook, ISBN 0-87431-320-1)
  - Kanawa Heavy Weapons (1991 sourcebook, ISBN 0-87431-325-2)
  - Kanawa Land Vehicles (1992 sourcebook, ISBN 0-87431-330-9)
  - Out of Nippon (1992 novel, ISBN 0-87431-345-7)
- Underground
  - Underground Notebook, (1993 sourcebook, ISBN 0-923763-91-0)
  - Underground Player's Handbook (1994 sourcebook, ISBN 1-56905-014-7) Coauthor
- The Whispering Vault
  - Dangerous Prey (1995 sourcebook, ISBN 1-886579-01-6)
