= Double Exposure (Shadowrun) =

Double Exposure is an adventure published by FASA in 1994 for the near-future cyberpunk role-playing game Shadowrun.

== Description ==
Double Exposure is a 64-page softcover book designed by Fraser Cane and Nigel Findley, with illustrations by Tom Baxa, Steve Bryant, Paul Daly, and Mike Jackson. It contains a Shadowrun adventure set in Seattle in which the players' characters are hired to investigate the relationship between a megacorporation and a charity.

== Reception ==
In the November 1994 edition of Dragon (Issue #211), Rick Swan calls this adventure "a tight little chiller worthy of Chaosium's Call of Cthulhu game." Swan noted the many "stomach-churning" scenes, saying "the cartoonish excesses [...] make this one of the most outrageous scenarios in Shadowrun history." Although he liked the many "evocative touches", Swan thought that "the designers were better at dreaming up ideas than developing them. Too often, for example, the story is driven by coincidence." Swan also disagreed with the finale, which encourages the party to flee rather than fight. He concluded by giving the adventure an average rating of 4 out of 6, saying, "Flaws aside, Double Exposure remains [an] accessible, fast-paced adventure, and a great way to spend a weekend."

In the next edition of Dragon (Issue #212, December 1994), Allen Varney also reviewed Double Exposure, and called it "suspenseful." He commented that "Some scenes don’t make a lot of sense, but they sure are creepy!", and concluded that Double Exposure was "an inventive and off-beat Shadowrun adventure in its own right."

== Reviews ==
- Rollespilsmagasinet Fønix (Danish) (Issue 5 - November/December 1994)
