= Iva Site =

Archaeological site

The Iva Site is an archaeological site located near the Mississippi River Valley in Wisconsin. First reported in 1979, subsequent excavations of the site found a notable effigy mound as well as numerous ceramic vessels believed to be of Middle Mississippian origin or imitation. The site is speculated to be the setting for a peaceful feast taking place with Middle Mississippian tribes and a Late Woodland populous from the upper Midwest.

== 2002-2003 excavations and findings ==
Prior to the 21st century, the only recorded observation of the Iva site was its initial record in 1979, which was a surface collection of a field during a survey of Sand Lake Coulee which found no sign of Mississippian presence. Continued investigation of adjacent sites did, however, allude to a major Oneota settlement as well Middle and Late Woodland presence. In 2002, a new excavation was sparked in light of the construction of a new residential housing development that would interfere with the site itself. Among the thirty exposed, bulldozed features were largely traditional Oneota storage pits in the northern end, as well as features reminiscent of Late Woodland and Middle Mississippian activity.

Findings within the back dirt piles contained numerous finding characteristic of Late Woodland wares, including several Angelo punctated sherds as well as pieces of Madison ware, characterized by a single cord-twist neck and three Madison Plain rims. Excavations also found one Aztalan Collard rim, which is ultimately dated somewhere between 1050 and 1150 A.D. and was relatively rare in the driftless area in which it was found, despite being more common in the heavily glaciated southeastern Wisconsin. Middle Mississippian ceramics were also found, namely grit-tempered and shell-tempered rolled rims, the latter of which was found in both burnished and red-slipped varieties.

The excavation ground itself contained mostly Angelo punctated body sherds and rims, as well as pieces of shell-tempered Middle Mississippian vessels, including two Ramey Incised jars. The site also contained another Madison Cord-Impressed sherd, which was decorated with horizontal cord impressions. Additionally, an effigy mound reminiscent of that of the aforementioned Late Woodland and Middle Mississippian societies was discovered. Along with the remains of ecofacts such as high quality deer cuts, rice, tobacco and what current evidence points to being a sacrificial dog. Some of the aforementioned vessels are also understood to be hybrids between the two groups' designs.

== Historical significance and speculation ==
The period of 1050-1200 A.D. marked a transitional period leading to the end of the late Woodland effigy mound culture in Wisconsin's Driftless area. In reference to this point, interaction between the southernmost Middle-Mississippian tribes and northern Late Woodland groups, as well as evidence toward Middle-Mississippian migration up north, had ultimately been rare. When Iva was discovered in the northern part of what was the Driftless Area, it contained a combination of both Middle Mississippian and Late Woodland vessel shards. The vessels' proximity to one-another, as well as the site's inclusion of various ecofacts reminiscent of a ceremonial feast had influenced the belief that the two effigy mound societies had interacted. The Middle Mississippian vessels are believed, through petrographic analysis, to be brought from the American Bottom to Salt Lake Coulee through a series of exchange networks. It is not known whether the Late Woodland inspired artifacts had been there prior to the Middle Mississippians' arrival or if the site served as a point of cooperation. Nonetheless, it is accepted that the interaction resulted in the creation of hybrid vessels. Another theory of site's purpose had it be the grounds for a peaceful feast between the Mississippians and the Late Woodland society, which would ultimately be unsuccessful as evident by the lack of additional prominent Mississippian sites in the region.
