= John Statema =

American comics artist and illustrator

- Occupation: Game designer

John R. Statema is an illustrator.

== Career ==
He has drawn comics for many publishers, starting in the mid-1980s. He has done work for several small press companies, on titles like The Hero Alliance and Evangeline. For DC Comics, he has done art on Manhunter, Superman, and others. In the early 1990s, for Malibu Comics, he illustrated The Solution and Prime. For Marvel Comics, he did art on Avengers Unplugged and G.I. Joe. He also worked for First Comics on Evangeline and GrimJack.

Statema has done artwork for numerous supplements to TSR's Marvel Super Heroes role-playing game, including the covers for the adventures MX1, Nightmares of Futures Past (1987), MX2, The X-Potential (1987), and MX4, Flames of Doom (1987), and he also did artwork for TSR's Marvel Superheroes Adventure Gamebooks including An X-Cellent Death (1987). His Dungeons & Dragons artwork includes Wildspace (1990), Practical Planetology (1991), The Dragon's Den (1992), and The Ruins of Myth Drannor (1993).

Statema has also worked as a character designer on the Nickelodeon cartoon series The Angry Beavers, and for Stan Lee Media and Sony Animation.
