= Underground (role-playing game) =

Tabletop superhero role-playing game

- Cover art by Geoff Darrow
- Designers: Ray Winninger
- Publishers: Mayfair Games
- Publication: 1993
- Genres: Science fiction, comedy
- Systems: Mayfair Exponential Game System (variant)

Underground is a satirical "grim and gritty"-style superhero role playing game set in the near future. It was released by Mayfair Games in 1993 as a commentary on the politics and society of the early 1990s. It is set in the year 2021 of an alternative timeline.

== Overview ==
Inspired by the Dark Age of Comic Books, Aeon Flux, and the political and social upheavals of the early 1990s, the game attempts to inspire social and political debate among its players as well as provide entertainment through playing renegade superheroes. In it, players typically play unemployed, genetically enhanced veterans of corporate wars.

The backstory for Underground borrowed heavily from Pat Mills' Marshal Law and Alan Moore's version of Marvelman, two of the earliest deconstructionist superhero comics of the 1980s. The former had concentrated on genetically engineered super soldiers recently come back from an unsuccessful war in South America. The latter featured technology gathered from a crashed alien spacecraft and psychological conditioning in a virtual reality environment. The art used in Underground was intentionally inspired by the Aeon Flux animated shorts, as well as the comic books Marshal Law, Watchmen and Elektra: Assassin!.

== Setting ==
It's 2021, and the Dream is Dead

The future timeline of Underground begins with a UFO crash in 1996 in the Florida Everglades. The UFO was a small escape pod from a larger interstellar starship and contained a pair of lobster-like aliens, codenamed Alpha and Omega. While officially a secret, the entire world witnessed the crash and the secrets of the UFO leaked to the entire world within a year. Apparently, the alien technology was based entirely on manipulation of amino acid chains and advanced biotechnology, which started a revolution in genetic engineering. This resulted in major corporations and the wealthy gaining even more power and becoming far more decadent, while the poor remained oppressed even more so.

Rapper-activists Flavor Flav and Chuck D are assassinated on August 11, 1998, in Columbus, Georgia by a psychotic off-duty policeman. Their untimely deaths are commemorated in a national holiday called "Chuck D Day", celebrated on the first Monday in August.

World politics are dominated by the Second Cold War, which is a three-way deadlock between the North American Confederation, China, and the European Community.

In 2003 the United States has annexed most of Canada as the 51st through 58th states and Puerto Rico and Cuba are absorbed as the 59th and 60th States. Quebec separatists managed to form an independent Quebec and absorbed the Maritime Provinces right before the American annexation, creating the People's Republic of Quebec, a communist state allied with Neo-Deutschland. The United States, Mexico and Central America (minus the Neo-Vatican) join to form the North American Confederation.

The European Community is dominated by Neo-Deutschland. It controls all of unified Europe under a tyrannical fascist theocracy where Scientology has become the dominant religion. Neo-Deutschland is administered by the ARC Party and is run by a Chancellor assisted by the Ministers of Having, Wanting, and Being. The Holy See is sent into exile in Nicaragua (which it takes over as a theocracy of its own called the Neo-Vatican).

On April 12–17, 2008, a penal colony on the Moon staged a revolt and became an independent state called Luna. It is run by a council of "Houses" made up of the major specialized prison gangs (like Drugs, Prostitution, Technology, and Public Works).

Apartheid in South Africa didn't end until 2010, when the entire nation went into bankruptcy from worldwide boycotts. South Africa has been replaced by "New Providence", a gigantic nationwide vacation resort staffed by the South African population.

On August 1, 2011, popular Liberal Independent president Raymond Milkovich is assassinated at a "Chuck D Day" rally in Los Angeles. His vice president Saul Stevens loses to Plutocrat candidate Daryl F. Gates in 2012.

An entire sub-race of human beings has been created through cloning: the "Pre-frontals", who only have 45 chromosomes. This causes them to have an underdeveloped pre-frontal cortex, so they have an extremely low intelligence, have difficulty delaying gratification or forming long-term plans, and have trouble separating fantasy from reality. They were originally created by the MacRaney's fast-food chain to staff their restaurants and consume their product, as they have tailored metabolisms that can only digest MacRaney's foods. They are relegated to unskilled blue-collar jobs and live in the ghettos of major cities. They exist as a servant class that is deprived of all civil rights due to society legally and constitutionally redefining what it means to be "human".

Dressing up in costumes on Halloween is now banned nationwide after an incident in which a couple dressed as Leopold and Loeb went on a killing spree, shooting anyone with a "stupid" costume. People violating the ban (like homeless "boosted" veterans) can be shot on sight due to a fear of copycats.

Computers now run on "wetware" drives that store data on artificial brain tissue. Cheap drives are run on scavenged human or animal brains. There is a black market for "wetware" provided by "brainjackers" who steal people's brains, usually by ripping their heads and spinal cords out of their bodies. People can sell their brains and get mechanical artificial intelligence computer replacements that make them happier and more productive. Entertainment media like TV is optimized to cater to people (and sentient robots) with certain brands or models of artificial brains (like the 64-MB XM70).

In 2016 the G.I. Bill is redrawn to provide either an education, or job training, or housing for up to three years to a demobilized "boosted" soldier. The Fair Housing Act of 2017 created "veterans only" housing projects; these became run-down, poverty-stricken, and crime-riddled ghettos controlled by "boosted" criminal gangs. These were concentrated in urban sprawl areas of large cities on the west coast so the veterans could be segregated and easily controlled, making Los Angeles home to the largest "boosted" population in North America.

Los Angeles street gangs are polarized into two large multi-ethnic factions: the People (who wear checkered clothing) and the Folks (who wear plaid).

The Democrat and Republican parties have fused into the Republicrat Party, which exists to provide token opposition to the dominant Plutocrat Party founded by Ross Perot. The basic doctrine of the Plutocrats is whatever is good for Big Business and the wealthy is good for the nation. The rising National Anti-Socialist Party, a conservative populist movement, is gaining influence as a party of the people.

In a twist common to cyberpunk literature, mega-corporations have gained legal sovereignty. Large multi-national corporations can legally enter into treaties, grant diplomatic immunity, and field private armies (which they typically rent out to other entities). Their property is considered sovereign territory, like that of a nation.

Are YOU a people person? - Tastee Ghoul ad blurb

Human cannibalism is extremely popular, first gaining prominence at secret underground restaurants in the late 1990s. Instead of signing an organ donor card, people sign a card which gives their next of kin a token fee and consents to having the deceased's body processed into food when they die. The most popular fast-food chain in the world is Tastee Ghoul, which exclusively serves human flesh and gives away disposable polymer handguns in its Happy Meals. Sweeney's is an upscale cannibalism theme restaurant chain (like Bennigan's, TGI Friday's, or Chili's). Boosted mercenaries who die in their employ are featured as a "Daily Special".

The Constitution of the United States has been heavily modified. Its many new amendments are responsible for (among other things) sharply limiting free speech as potential slander, expanding free speech to cover acts of terrorism, granting some corporate bodies legal sovereignty, and defining "humans" as "beings which have or once had 46 chromosomes". Constitutional amendments now have corporate sponsors, with the amendments themselves having corporate naming rights and its slogans inserted in the amendment's text as product placement.

The president in 2021 is Plutocrat Charles K. Foster, who mentioned in his inaugural address "As a good friend of mine once asked, 'can't we all just get along?'"

== Plot ==
Player characters in the game are genetically enhanced ex-mercenaries who were given superpowers by reverse engineered genetic technology recovered from the UFO crash. They are given extensive genetic modifications (called "boosting"). Then after being decanted they work as augmented mercenaries (called "Boosts") for any one of several private armies operated by giant corporations, fighting in small wars around the world.

This is paired with psychological conditioning (the Bushmiller Process) in the form of a virtual reality simulation (called "Dreamland") that teaches them how to handle and use their new powers. The virtual world looks just like a "four-color" Silver Age superhero comic book, except it's ultra-violent and merciless to simulate combat conditions and desensitize the recruits to violence. Subjects are made to believe that their fictional life in the virtual world was real, then are later deprogrammed and normalized into accepting mundane reality after their discharge.

A Player Character begins as he's discharged from service as a genetically enhanced warrior who had been conditioned to think of himself as an ultraviolent superhero with a bizarre origin story and a dramatic past. They tend to see the world in the uncompromising black-and-white ethos of superhero comics filtered through the mental illnesses and phobias triggered by the process that grants them their powers. They are dumped in the decaying ruins of an American culture with civilians who fear and hate them and a corrupt and totalitarian government that ignores them (an intentional reference to the state of Vietnam veterans coming home after the Vietnam War). The fact that they were brainwashed by the corporations that employed them and were betrayed by the governments that hired them often makes them distrustful of authority. It is presumed that the player characters join and form various "Underground" movements to oppose the government, giant corporations, or other tyrannical forces in the world.

== System ==
The game rules for Underground is an adaptation of the Mayfair Exponential Game System, originally developed at Mayfair Games for the earlier DC Heroes roleplaying game depicting the DC Universe. However the rules were modified to depict lower-powered characters in a deadlier setting.

The Underground game books had color-coded text. Each line of text in the books was colored differently if it was part of the rules, an example of game play, optional rules, or fiction and exposition for the setting.

As part of the political and social nature of the game, and to encourage games to be about righting the many wrongs in the setting, the designer included Parameter Rules. This is a mechanism wherein the players could change the entire setting. The rules allowed the players to change the parameters of an area, or even the country or the whole world. The drawback is that affecting one parameter (like Quality of Life or Education), would adjust another (like Take-Home Pay or Wealth). Because they are heroes the players can, with enough time and effort, change parameters without penalties if they perform actions that lead to change.

== Core Rules and Supplements ==
- Winninger, Ray (1993). Underground: It's 2021 and the Dream is Dead. Skokie, IL: Mayfair Games. ISBN 0-923763-87-2.
- Kubasik, Christopher (1993). Streets Tell Stories: L.A.: Campaign Sourcepack. Skokie, IL: Mayfair Games. ISBN 0-923763-89-9.
- Findley, Nigel D. (1993). Underground Notebook. Skokie, IL: Mayfair Games. ISBN 0-923763-91-0.
- Gitelman, Mitch (1993). Fully Strapped, Always Packed: Gats and Gear from the Underground. Skokie, IL: Mayfair Games. ISBN 0-923763-96-1.
- Underground Gamemaster Pack (1993)
- Tabb, Doug, ed.;Loren L. Coleman, Nigel Findley, Aaron Loeb, Chris Pramas, and Scot Yonan (1994). Underground Player's Handbook. Skokie, IL: Mayfair Games. ISBN 1-56905-014-7.
- Murphy, Paul (1994). Techno: Gear and Accessories for Underground. Skokie, IL: Mayfair Games. ISBN 1-56905-064-3.
- Coleman, Loren (1994). Underground Companion: So Lifelike, You'll Swear It's Real. Skokie, IL: Mayfair Games. ISBN 1-56905-065-1.
- Laws, Robin D. (1994). Ways and Means: The Democracy City Sourcebook. Skokie, IL: Mayfair Games. ISBN 1-56905-021-X.
- Witt, Sam (1996). Steel Deep: The Luna Sourcebook. Skokie, IL: Mayfair Games. ISBN 1-56905-015-5.

Robin Jenkins (1993) Hell Bent was published by Atlas Games AG5400 ISBN 978-1-56905-063-7

== Reception ==
Chris W. McCubbin reviewed Underground for Pyramid #2 (July/Aug. 1993) and stated that "Any super hero GM with a nasty sense of humor (and in my experience, that's most of them) is advised to buy this book for the excellent background material."

Stewart Wieck reviewed Underground in White Wolf #37 (July/Aug. 1993), rating it a 4 out of 5 and stated that "Underground does have its flaws. I'm especially worried about whether the excessive dice rolling will become tiresome. There's also a lack of variety in the story hooks. Still, I think it will find a good-sized and very dedicated following. I suggest picking it up if you can afford buying a game you might not be able to play."

In his 2023 book Monsters, Aliens, and Holes in the Ground, RPG historian Stu Horvath commented, "Satire is easy to misread. Off the top, about a third of Underground hits sour notes, born largely out of the conflations of shock value with the perception of maturity and a conscious desire to cut against the omnipresent notion of political correctness, a very '90s era pitfall." However, Horvath noted "The game's saving grace is in its encouragement of players to be more than nihilistic cyberpunk assholes." Horvath concluded, "For all of the poor taste, wobbly satire, and ultraviolence in Underground, I can't think of another RPG with a system so explicitly focused on making the world a better place, one block at a time."

== Awards ==
At the 1993 Origins Awards, Underground won in the category Best Roleplaying Adventure.

== Reviews ==
- Dosdediez (Número 2 - Ene/Feb 1994)
- Rollespilsmagasinet Fønix (Danish) (Issue 1 - March/April 1994)
- Casus Belli #77
- Science Fiction Age
