= The Astromundi Cluster =

Book by Sam Witt

- Genre: Role-playing game
- Publisher: TSR, Inc.
- Publication date: 1993
- Media type: Boxed set

The Astromundi Cluster is a 1993 boxed set accessory for the Spelljammer campaign setting, part of the Advanced Dungeons & Dragons fantasy role-playing game.

== Contents ==
The Astromundi Cluster described a unique crystal sphere composed of free-floating asteroids. The sphere's weak barriers encourage free passage between the Prime Material Plane and the Inner Planes, resulting in a bizarre and potentially explosive mix of creatures. The "Celestial Almanac" lists dozens of locales, from the outcast colony of Chakarak to the orchard-laden Boyarny. The "Astrogator's Guide" provides game statistics for the Doombat and other new ships.

== Publication history ==
The Astromundi Cluster was designed by Sam Witt, and published by TSR in 1993. The box cover painting and interior art was by David O. Miller, with the booklet cover painting by Jeff Easley.

== Reception ==
Rick Swan reviewed The Astromundi Cluster for Dragon magazine #203 (March 1994). He felt that this "lavish boxed set" was "Intended to jump-start sleepy Spelljammer campaigns". He had two gripes about the boxed set, one being that some of the names "are more silly than sinister, like the mist-covered bodies called Gasteroids, and the shadowy lands known as the Grim Regions", and the other being that with 192 pages to work with, "couldn't the designer have found room for at least one fully-developed adventure?"
