= Avengers Unplugged =

Publication information
- Publisher: Marvel Comics
- Schedule: Monthly
- Genre: Superhero
- Publication date: October 1995 to August 1996
- Main character: Avengers

Creative team
- Artist: John Statema
- Editor: Mark Gruenwald

Avengers Unplugged is a six-issue limited series published by Marvel Comics. The series ran irregularly from October 1995 to August 1996. Mark Gruenwald was the editor for issues #5–6. John Statema did artwork for the series.

According to Marvel.com, the fifth issue was published on June 1, 1996, written by Glenn Herdling, pencilled by M.C. Wyman, with cover work by Wyman and Sandu Florea.

== Plot summary ==
Issue #1 features Black Widow, Giant-Man, Hercules and the Vision battling Nefarius, as they transport him to the Vault, following the events in Captain America #443.

In issue #2, Graviton attacks the Avengers, but is defeated when they overload his powers, banishing him to an alternate dimension.

Issue #3 features Black Widow and Crystal on a "ladies night out", where they encounter the Super-Adaptoid, right before the events of Timeslide: The Crossing.

In issue #4, Titania asks the Absorbing Man to marry her. The wedding is attended by many supervillains; while the Avengers interrupt the ceremony, they leave the couple alone.

Monica Rambeau starred in issue #5. When Genis-Vell becomes an adventurer, he is known as Captain Marvel like his late father Mar-Vell, which Rambeau resents. After she, Starfox, and Genis team up to defeat the Controller, Genis tries to concede the Captain Marvel title to Rambeau since he feels she is more worthy of it. Rambeau declines out of respect for Mar-Vell's legacy and adopts a new alias as Photon.

In issue #6, Sean Dolan is drawn to the second Ebony Blade and once again becomes Bloodwraith.
