= Fate of Istus =

1989 roleplaying game supplement

- Code: WG8
- Rules required: Advanced Dungeons & Dragons
- Campaign setting: World of Greyhawk
- Authors: Nigel Findley, Dan Salas, Stephen Inniss, Robert J. Kuntz
- First published: February 1989

Linked modules
- .

Fate of Istus is a multipart adventure for the Dungeons & Dragons roleplaying game, taking place in the World of Greyhawk campaign setting. The module is designed for characters of any class or level, and was published as an in-game vehicle to explain the transition from the game's first to second edition. This is accomplished by goddess Istus's re-evaluation of the inhabitants of Oerth and making changes to the abilities of each character class.

== Plot synopsis ==
Fate of Istus is a collection containing a series of 10 adventure scenarios, each of them designed for player characters of a different character class, and all of them dealing with a plague created by the goddess Istus affecting a different city in the world of Greyhawk.

A deadly plague has stricken civilization; the players suspect this is a sinister test of some sort and venture out to stop it.

=== Table of Contents ===
Chapter	Page	Author
Introduction	2	
Ye Olde City's Scroll #1: Rockroost	3	
Adventure #1: The Sage's Tower	6	by Nigel Findley
Ye Olde City's Scroll #2: Rel Mord	14	
Adventure #2: Swords for Hire	17	by Dan Salas
Ye Olde City's Scroll #3: Jurnre	25	
Adventure #3: Countdown in Jurnre	28	by Stephen Inniss
Ye Olde City's Scroll #4: Elredd	37	
Adventure #4: Diambeth's Delving	40	by Nigel Findley
Ye Olde City's Scroll #5: Wintershiven	47	
Adventure #5: Service for the Dead	50	by Nigel Findley
Ye Olde City's Scroll #6: Leukish	58	
Adventure #6: The Garden of Evil	62	by Dan Salas
Ye Olde City's Scroll #7: Rauxes	26	
Adventure #7: Down with the Wizard	72	by Robert J. Kuntz
Ye Olde City's Scroll #8: Chendl	83	
Adventure #8: At the King's Right Hand	85	by Nigel Findley
Ye Olde City's Scroll #9: Verbobonc	93	
Adventure #9: Iuz's Gambit	95	by Robert J. Kuntz
Ye Olde City's Scroll #10: Hesuel IlShar	105	
Adventure #10: The Scarlet Masque	108	by Stephen Inniss
NPC #1: Cymbelline	120	by Nigel Findley
NPC #2: Alaric	122	by Dan Salas
NPC #3: Beastman Avatar	124	by Stephen Inniss
NPC #4: Arlina	126	by Nigel Findley
NPC #5: Narlond and the Prophet	127	by Robert J. Kuntz

=== Notable nonplayer characters ===
- Cymbelline: Half-elf 9th Level thief / 10th level bard
- Alaric: Human 7th level fighter
- Morgorath's Beastman Avatar: deity can appear as anything
- Arlina: 12th level cleric
- Narlond the white alchemist and the Prophet of Boccob: 18th level magic user

== Publication history ==
WG8 Fate of Istus was written by Nigel Findley, Dan Salas, Stephen Inniss, and Robert J. Kuntz, with a cover by Daniel Horne and interior illustrations by Karl Waller, and was published by TSR in 1989 as a 128-page book. The book's title appears as The Fate of Istus on both the title page/table of contents and in the Introduction.

=== Credits ===
Authors: Nigel Findley, Dan Salas, Stephen Inniss, Robert J. Kuntz
Coordinators: Bruce Heard, Karen S. Broomgarden Editing: Kim Mohan
Typography: Betty Elmore
Cartography: Diesel
Cover Art: Daniel Horne
Interior Art: Karl Waller

Distributed to the book trade in the United States by Random House, Inc., and in Canada by Random House of Canada, Ltd. Distributed to the toy and hobby trade by regional distributors. Distributed in the United Kingdom by TSR UK Ltd. ISBN 0-88038-712-2

== See also ==
- List of Dungeons & Dragons modules
