= GURPS Illuminati =

1992 supplement for the GURPS role-playing game

- Designers: Nigel Findley
- Publishers: Steve Jackson Games
- Publication: 1992; 34 years ago
- Genres: Conspiracy Theories
- Systems: GURPS third edition

GURPS Illuminati is a conspiracy theory and secret society sourcebook for the GURPS (Generic Universal Role-Playing System), written by Nigel Findley, and published by Steve Jackson Games in 1992. It won the Origins award for best role-playing game supplement in 1993,

== Contents ==
GURPS Illuminati is a book about all aspects of running and playing in role playing games involving conspiracies. As is obvious from the chapter headings, the writing is slightly whimsical, and the style of the book is reinforced by quotes from the supposed illuminati.

- Introduction, an introduction to GURPS, conspiracy theories, and GURPS Illuminati
- Characters, a chapter on character creation and development. This is the only chapter containing any rules for GURPS, although some of the other chapters have sample NPCs.
- The Illuminated Campaign, contains Gamemaster guidance on running an Illuminati campaign. It has details about suggested organisation, how to run illuminated groups, and how to create settings, and contains half a dozen suggested adventure seeds.
- Illuminated Groups, are suggested groups to use in a game that assumes that many or all conspiracy theories are real. Groups include The Illuminati, the Merovingian dynasty, the Cathars, the Priory of Sion, The Alphans, the "Time Meddlers", the Network, the Discordian Society, the Society of Assassins, the Templars, the Bavarian Illuminati, Banks and the Gnomes of Zurich, Environmental protesters and Ecoterrorists, the Freemasons, the Society of Light, Intelligence agencies, the Mafia, major corporations, Organised crime, Organised religion, Telephone companies, and Unions.
- Why does Mr. Beamish have tinfoil in his hat? is a chapter about being on the outer edge of conspiracies, and how they can appear to have more influence and leverage than they actually do.
- Just the facts, Ma'am, is a chapter about knowing about conspiracy theories, responses, and how the conspiracies cover up when evidence about them is unearthed.
- The Men in black, is a chapter about actively joining overarching conspiracies, or otherwise being on the inside of them.
- Fnord! is a chapter about non-fictional secret societies, and about adding secret societies and conspiracies to settings that didn't previously have them.
- Press the button marked "Help", is chapter of gamemaster advice on actual play.

In addition there are a few pages of bibliography and further reading.

== Publication history ==
GURPS Illuminati built on the Illuminati card game, in its turn inspired by Robert Shea and Robert Anton Wilson's The Illuminatus! Trilogy.

== Reception ==
GURPS Illuminati won the 1992 Origins Award for best roleplaying supplement.

Craig Sheeley reviewed GURPS Illuminati for Challenge #66. Sheeley comments in his conclusion: "GURPS Illuminati is one of this season's bestsellers for Steve Jackson Games, outselling even their masterpiece, Hacker. This is not to say that there are a lot of people out there who buy the conspiracy theory, or that there are a lot of gamers wanting to actually play the game of paranoia [...] More likely, there are a lot of people who appreciate a good product and a funny read."

Jim Swallow reviewed GURPS Illuminati for Arcane magazine, rating it a 9 out of 10 overall, and stated that "The irreverent tone is GURPS writing at its best, full of ideas skewed just enough that you're unsure if you should laugh or start sweeping the room for bugs."

== Reviews ==
- Alarums & Excursions (Issue 260 – Apr 1997)
- The Unspeakable Oath #14/15
- Casus Belli #70 (July 1992)
- Coleção Dragão Brasil

== See also ==
- The Illuminatus! Trilogy
- Illuminati: New World Order
- List of conspiracy theories
- List of GURPS books
