= Underground Gamemaster Pack =

Underground Gamemaster Pack is a 1993 role-playing supplement for Underground published by Mayfair Games.

== Contents ==
Underground Gamemaster Pack is a supplement in which a three-sided gamemaster's screen comes with character sheets and a world map.

== Reception ==
Gene Alloway reviewed Underground Gamemaster Pack in White Wolf #42 (April, 1994), rating it a 2.5 out of 5 and stated that "I'm not a great fan of screens, but this is a good one. The map and character sheets add to the product and are useful for planning. The great graphics should also contribute atmosphere to play, getting you in the Underground frame of mind."
