= Phylactery =

Phylactery may refer to:

- Amulet, an object believed to confer protection or grace upon its possessor
- Phylactery (Dungeons & Dragons), a magic item in the role-playing game
- Reliquary, a container for relics
- Speech scroll, an illustrative device denoting speech, song, or other types of sound
- Tefillin, a set of small black leather boxes with leather straps containing scrolls of parchment inscribed with verses from the Torah

== See also ==
- Hunping, translated as soul jar or soul vase, a type of Chinese ceramic funerary urn
- List of Mandaic manuscripts
- Phylactery Factory, a 2008 album by White Hinterland
