= The Universal Brotherhood =

Role-playing game adventure

Cover art by Joel Biske, 1990

The Universal Brotherhood is an adventure published by FASA in 1990 for the dystopic near-future cyberpunk role-playing game Shadowrun.

== Description ==
The player characters, based in Seattle, are hired to do a "simple trace and recovery job" to retrieve an "expensive trinket back from a weak-kneed suit's vanished mistress". In the course of the heist, the characters become aware of a national self-help organization called the Universal Brotherhood, and their original objective takes a "nightmarish plunge", bringing them face to face with an evil, existential threat.

The adventure comprises two books:

- the actual Shadowrun adventure titled "Missing Blood"
- A novella titled "The Universal Brotherhood", supposedly a reporter's account of his investigation into the Universal Brotherhood. The players discover this during their investigation and must read it to discover clues.

== Publication history ==
FASA originally published the cyberpunk role-playing game Shadowrun in 1989. Over the next few years, FASA published dozens of supplements and adventures, including The Universal Brotherhood in 1990, a 55-page adventure written Chris Kubasik, with interior art by Earl Geier, Jeff Laubenstein, Jim Nelson, and Joel Biske, and cover art by Biske. The adventure was packaged with an 88-page novella written by Nigel Findley.

In the 2014 book Designers & Dragons: The '90s, game historian Shannon Appelcline noted that following the publication of Shadowrun in 1989, "Over the next few years, Shadowrun was supported by over a dozen supplements each year—some of which were quite well-received, such as Seattle Sourcebook (1990), one of the first extensive RPG descriptions of a modern city, and Nigel Findley’s adventure, The Universal Brotherhood (1990). The line would eventually include a second edition of the rules (1992), which cleaned up some of the game systems and updated the timeline to 2053, following three years of metaplot advances detailed in the various supplements."

== Reception ==
Matthew Gabbert examined Universal Brotherhood in Issue 25 of White Wolf Magazine, providing a mixed review, although he did note the adventure was "full of great NPCs, plenty of action, and has the best description of a Matrix run" that he had seen to date. He concluded by giving the adventure an average rating of 3 out of 5.

In the November 1992 edition of Dragon (Issue #187), Allen Varney called the 88-page novella included in the game "brilliantly written", but thought the requirement that the players had to read it was a case of "style overcomes common sense. You’re running the game for your players, their characters find this thing, then you have to stop for a week while everybody reads it." He also noted that the cover of the adventure gave away a large plot twist to the players and recommended that the gamemaster cover it. Varney concluded, "In certain respects, The Universal Brotherhood is the best-presented adventure I’ve ever seen, but it pushes too far beyond the envelope for practical purposes."

== Reviews ==
- GamesMaster International (Issue 7 - Feb 1991)
