= Skull & Crossbows =

Dungeons & Dragons module

- The cover of the Skull & Crossbows module, with art by Brom. The artwork depicts a hammership, crewed by undead, flying through a misty region of wildspace.
- Code: SJA2
- TSR product code: 9286
- Rules required: Advanced Dungeons & Dragons 2nd edition
- Character levels: 6-10
- Campaign setting: Spelljammer
- Authors: Nigel Findley
- First published: 1990

Linked modules
- SJA1 SJA2 SJA3 SJA4

Skull & Crossbows is an adventure module published in 1990 for the Advanced Dungeons & Dragons fantasy role-playing game.

== Plot summary ==
Skull & Crossbows is a sequel to SJA1 Wildspace and consists of several connected Spelljammer adventure scenarios in which space pirates are involved.

== Publication history ==
SJA2 Skull & Crossbows was written by Nigel Findley, with a cover by Brom, and was published by TSR in 1990 as a 64-page booklet with a map and an outer folder.

== Reviews ==
- Games Review (Volume 2, Issue 10 - Jul 1990)
