= Aztlán (disambiguation) =

Aztlán is the mythic homeland of the Aztec people.

Aztlán or Aztlan may also refer to

- Aztlán metro station, a station on the Monterrey Metro
- Aztlán (journal), an academic journal published by the UCLA Chicano Studies Research Center
- Aztlán, a symbol in the Chicano Movement
- Aztlán (album), the sixth studio album by mexican rock band Zoé
- Aztlán Parque Urbano, an amusement park in Mexico City
- Aztlan (Shadowrun), a 1995 supplement for the role-playing game Shadowrun

== See also ==
- Aztalan State Park, Wisconsin, U.S.
- Aztalan, Wisconsin, a town in Wisconsin
