= Greyspace =

1992 role-playing game supplement

- Cover art by Thomas Baxa
- Author: Nigel Findley
- Genre: Fantasy role-playing game
- Publisher: TSR, Inc.
- Publication date: 1992
- Media type: Book
- Pages: 96
- ISBN: 1-56076-348-5

Greyspace (product code SJR6) is a supplement published by TSR in 1992 for the steampunk role-playing campaign setting Spelljammer, which uses the rules for Dungeons & Dragons.

== Contents ==
Greyspace describes a part of the sphere of the Ptolemaic system that surrounds the planet Oerth of the Greyhawk setting. The book has 18 chapters that describe:

- the planets Oerth, Kule, Raenei, Liga, The Grinder, Edill, Gnibile, Conatha, Ginsel, Borka, Greela, and The Spectre.
- Other astronomical bodies and phenomena
- Spacefaring companies, including pirate bands, trading companies and mercenaries
- Adventure ideas
- New magical items
- The limitations of religion while travelling in space
- Three space-faring monsters

The book also includes a wall poster illustrating a map of the Sphere of Known Space.

== Publication history ==
In 1989, TSR introduced a number of new RPG campaign settings, including Spelljammer, which added a note of steampunk science fiction to the fantasy Greyhawk setting. TSR subsequently published several supplements and adventures for Spelljammer, including Greyspace in 1992, a 96-page softcover book written by Nigel Findley, with cover art by Tom Baxa, interior illustrations by David O. Miller, and cartography by John Knecht.

== Reception ==
Greyspace was a finalist for "Trophée du meilleur supplément, français ou étranger, publié en 1992 pour un jeu de rôle" ("Best Role-playing Supplement of 1992, French or foreign-language") awarded by the French RPG magazine Casus Belli.
