= Aztalan (disambiguation) =

Aztalan can refer to related places in Wisconsin in the United States:

- Aztalan, Wisconsin, a town
  - Aztalan, Wisconsin (community), within the above town
  - Aztalan State Park

== See also ==
- Aztlán (disambiguation)
