= Thieves of Lankhmar =

Dungeons & Dragons adventure module

- Code: LNA1
- TSR product code: 9276
- Authors: Nigel Findley
- First published: 1990

Thieves of Lankhmar is an adventure module published in 1990 for the Advanced Dungeons & Dragons fantasy role-playing game.

== Contents ==
Thieves of Lankhmar goes into detail on Lankhmar's powerful Thieves' Guild, and also provides background information on the government and legal system of Lankhmar, and suggestions for adventure scenarios for the thief class of characters.

== Publication history ==
LNA1 Thieves of Lankhmar was written by Nigel Findley, with a cover by Fred Fields, and was published by TSR in 1990 as a 64-page book.

== Reception ==
In the June 1990 edition of Games International, the reviewer complained that "Some of the AD&Disms trample on Lieber's creation a little", but admitted that "the author's obvious enthusiasm for the source shines through."
