= Steel Deep =

Steel Deep is a 1996 role-playing game supplement published by Mayfair Games for Underground.

== Contents ==
Steel Deep is a supplement in which the focus is Luna, a tourist resort on the Moon with a troubled past. Originally built as a high-security prison to manage America's overcrowded system—where long sentences were commuted to life on the Moon—Luna's penal colony collapsed when funding dried up and inmates seized control. Unable to retake the facility, and threatened by lunar mass drivers capable of striking Earth, the U.S. eventually conceded sovereignty to the lunar colony, which rebranded itself as a tourist destination.

== Reception ==
Andy Butcher reviewed Steel Deep: The Luna Sourcebook for Arcane magazine, rating it an 8 out of 10 overall, and stated that "Steel Deep is a high-quality supplement that meshes well with the existing background, but expands the options available to referees and players. The history and background of Luna is well thought out, and there's lots of advice for running adventures and campaigns."

== Reviews ==
- Dragon #237
