= Flames of Doom =

Role-playing game supplement

- Cover art by John Statema and Jerry Ordway
- Designers: David "Zeb" Cook
- Publishers: TSR
- Publication: 1987
- Genres: Superhero RPG
- Systems: Marvel Super Heroes

Flames of Doom is a role-playing game adventure published by TSR in 1987 for the Marvel Super Heroes role-playing game.

== Contents ==
Flames of Doom is a scenario for the Advanced rules, the fourth in the future-history X-Men series: the final battle against the Sentinels.

The gamemaster must first choose one of eight endings to work towards. In the adventure, Mystique has become aware of the player characters, and sends the Sentinels to kill them. If this fails, Mystique meets the characters in disguise, and sets up an ambush. If this fails, Mystique offers a cease-fire in order to safeguard civilian lives if the characters will join her cause. If the characters reject her cease-fire, she declares all-out war.

== Publication history ==
In 1984, TSR acquired the license to publish a role-playing game based on characters from Marvel Comics. The result was the very popular Marvel Super Heroes: The Heroic Role-Playing Game. This was followed two years later by a greatly expanded Marvel Superheroes Advanced Game. TSR published many adventures for this edition, including the Future in Flames quatrology. The first three adventures were Nightmares of Futures Past, The X-Potential, and Reap the Whirlwind.

The fourth and final adventure of that series was MX4 Flames of Doom, written by David "Zeb" Cook, with a cover by John Statema and Jerry Ordway. It was published by TSR in 1987 as a 32-page softcover saddle-stapled book, with a large color map and an outer folder.

== Reception ==
Writing in The Complete Guide to Role-Playing Games, Rick Swan called the Marvel Super Heroes game "a smooth introduction to role-playing for fans of the comics, and as such it's an qualified success." Swan went on to highly recommend Flames of Doom and the other adventures in the Future in Flames series, noting they "feature a future Earth where super-powered mutants are hunted down and imprisoned in camps." However, Swan warned that this adventure was not for the faint-hearted but rather for "ambitious players."
