= Crystal Spheres =

Role-playing game supplement

- The cover of the Crystal Spheres module, with art by Brom. The artwork depicts the Hummingbird, swooping past a darkened sun.
- Code: SJA3
- Rules required: Advanced Dungeons & Dragons 2nd edition
- Character levels: 5-7
- Campaign setting: Spelljammer
- Authors: J. Paul LaFountain
- First published: 1990

Crystal Spheres is an adventure module published in 1990 for the Advanced Dungeons & Dragons fantasy role-playing game.

== Plot summary ==
Crystal Spheres is a Spelljammer scenario in which the player characters encounter a unique ship, called the Hummingbird, and its captain asks them to help save his homesphere from a mysterious bard called T'Lann. It describes "four new crystal spheres":

- Herospace: a sphere "for heroic adventures only, with 9 planets divided by alignment"
- Faeriespace: a sphere that "is one gigantic community"
- Greatspace: "an elder sphere focused on nobility and honor"
- Darkspace: "a sunless, shadowy void"

== Publication history ==
SJA3 Crystal Spheres was written by J. Paul LaFountain, with a cover by Brom, and was published by TSR in 1990. The 64-page booklet included a poster and an outer folder.

== Reception ==
Shannon Appelcline commented that the module "does a great job of providing good reasons to adventure across Wildspace from one sphere to another", however, the Spelljammer campaign setting "never brought together its many spheres into a coherent setting" and the spheres introduced in this module "would never be heard from again". Appelcline highlighted that "Crystal Spheres lies on the line between the adventuring tropes of the '80s and '90s" and "also includes a beautiful chart comparing the sizes of the many spelljamming vessels revealed to date – including the Hummingbird from this very adventure".
