= Wildspace (module) =

Dungeons & Dragons adventure module

- The cover of the Wildspace module, with art by Brom. The artwork depicts a galleon flying in the air above the sea of a world.
- Code: SJA1
- TSR product code: 9273
- Rules required: Advanced Dungeons & Dragons 2nd edition
- Character levels: 6-8
- Campaign setting: Spelljammer
- Authors: Allen Varney
- First published: 1990

Linked modules
- SJA1 SJA2 SJA3 SJA4

Wildspace is an adventure module published in 1990 for the Advanced Dungeons & Dragons fantasy role-playing game.

== Plot summary ==
Wildspace is a Spelljammer adventure scenario and an introduction to campaigning in space, in which the player characters board a ship from the skies and are taken into space where they fight a monster that wants to eat their world.

== Publication history ==
SJA1 Wildspace was written by Allen Varney, with a cover by Brom, and was published by TSR in 1990 as a 64-page booklet with a large color map and an outer folder.

== Reviews ==
- Games Review (Volume 2, Issue 7 - Apr 1990)
