= Lost Ships =

Role-playing game supplement

- The cover to the Lost Ships supplement
- Genre: Role-playing game
- Publisher: TSR, Inc.
- Publication date: 1990
- Media type: Book

Lost Ships is an accessory for the Advanced Dungeons & Dragons fantasy role-playing game.

== Contents ==
Lost Ships is a Spelljammer supplement which describes a region of space where derelict ships and strange creatures congregate.

== Publication history ==
SJR1 Lost Ships was written by Ed Greenwood, with a cover by Brom, and was published by TSR in 1990 as a 96-page book.
