= Van Richten's Guide to the Lich =

1993 role-playing game accessory by Erik Haddock

- Author: Erik Haddock
- Genre: Role-playing games
- Publisher: TSR
- Publication date: 1993
- Pages: 96

Van Richten's Guide to the Lich is an accessory for the 2nd edition of the Advanced Dungeons & Dragons fantasy role-playing game, published in 1993.

== Contents ==
The 96-page booklet is designed for the Ravenloft campaign setting series. It contains general adventure information as well as specific information related to liches.

== Publication history ==
The module was written by Erik Haddock with artwork by Stephen Fabian and published by TSR.

== Reception ==
Gene Alloway reviewed Van Richten's Guide to the Lich in a 1994 issue of White Wolf. On a scale of 1 to 5, he rated the module a 3 for Complexity, a 4 for Appearance, and a 5 for Concepts, Playability, and Value. He thought of the module as "a great value. It places the lich in its proper terrifying place, alongside the ghosts and vampires that haunt Ravenloft and the mortals living there. It's a complete work and one worth the cost for any gamer." Overall, Alloway rated it a 4.5 out of 5.
