= Spelljammer =

Dungeons & Dragons fictional campaign setting

- The Spelljammer logo
- Designers: Jeff Grubb
- Publishers: TSR, Inc. Wizards of the Coast
- Publication: November 1, 1989; 36 years ago
- Genres: Fantasy Tabletop role-playing game
- Systems: Advanced Dungeons & Dragons 2nd Edition; Dungeons & Dragons 3rd edition; Dungeons & Dragons 4th edition; Dungeons & Dragons 5th Edition

Spelljammer is a campaign setting originally published for the Advanced Dungeons & Dragons (2nd edition) role-playing game, which features a fantastic (as opposed to scientific) outer space environment. Subsequent editions have included Spelljammer content; a Dungeons & Dragons 5th edition setting update was released on August 16, 2022.

Spelljammer introduced into the AD&D universe a comprehensive system of fantasy astrophysics, including the Ptolemaic concept of crystal celestial spheres. Crystal spheres may contain multiple worlds and are navigable using ships equipped with "spelljamming helms". Ships powered by spelljamming helms are capable of flying into not only the sky but into space. With their own fields of gravity and atmosphere, the ships have open decks and tend not to resemble the spaceships of science fiction, but instead look more like galleons, animals, birds, fish or even more wildly fantastic shapes.

The Spelljammer setting is designed to allow the usual sword and sorcery adventures of Dungeons & Dragons to take place within the framework of outer space tropes. Flying ships travel through the vast expanses of interplanetary space, visiting moons and planets and other stellar objects.

Like the Planescape setting, Spelljammer unifies most of the other AD&D settings and provides a canonical method for allowing characters from one setting (such as Dragonlance) to travel to another (such as the Forgotten Realms). However, unlike Planescape, it keeps all of the action on the Prime Material Plane and uses the crystal spheres, and the "phlogiston" between them, to form natural barriers between otherwise incompatible settings. Though the cosmology is derived largely from the Ptolemaic system of astronomy, many of the ideas owe much to the works of Jules Verne and his contemporaries, and to related games and fiction with a steampunk or planetary romance flavor. A strong Age of Sail flavor is also present.

== Publication history ==
Shannon Appelcline, in the book Designers & Dragons (2011), highlighted that in 1989 Spelljammer was the first of a host of new campaign settings published by TSR. It was created by Jeff Grubb and "introduced a universe of magical starships traversing the 'crystal spheres' that contained all the earthbound AD&D campaign worlds. It suggested a method to connect together all of TSR's settings and at the same time introduced fun new Jules Verne-esque technology that had never before been seen in the game. It was innovative and popular". Appelcline commented that Spelljammer "offered a way to connect every single D&D fantasy world, was thus one of the first true crossovers" in role-playing games.

=== Advanced Dungeons & Dragons (2nd edition) ===
Original Spelljammer boxed set (TSR, 1989)

The Spelljammer: AD&D Adventures in Space space fantasy boxed set was released in 1989. Several of TSR's other campaign worlds had their own sections in the Spelljammer Boxed Set - Realmspace for the Forgotten Realms, Krynnspace for Dragonlance, and Greyspace for Greyhawk. Along with the new sphere - Clusterspace - they were known as the "Big Three and Astromundi". Dark Sun, Ravenloft and Mystara weren't included, as the first two did not fit with the setting and the Mystara only used the D&D rules, not the AD&D rules.

The product line would be expanded with a number of boxed sets and accessories such as Lost Ships (1990), Realmspace (1991) and The Astromundi Cluster (1993). Appelcline commented that The Astromundi Cluster acted as "a soft reboot of the Spelljammer line" and was more of setting focused sourcebook than previous Spelljammer books which acted more "as a conduit between all of the other AD&D settings". The first adventure module, titled Wildspace, was released in 1990; four connected adventure modules followed it. A longer campaign module, Heart of the Enemy, was then published in 1992 followed by an adventure anthology, Space Lairs, in 1993.

The monsters of Spelljammer were detailed in two installments of the Monstrous Compendium series, Spelljammer Appendix in 1990 and Spelljammer Appendix II in 1991.

In 1993, Space Lairs and The Astromundi Cluster were the final products of the line. Appelcline commented on the end of the setting in the Advanced Dungeons & Dragons era: "TSR's fifth second-edition campaign world, Planescape (1993), was released to replace Spelljammer, which had just then ended. TSR wanted a new world-spanning setting and Slade Henson came up with the answer by suggesting a new setting built on Jeff Grubb's first-edition Manual of the Planes (1987). [...] Unlike Spelljammer this new setting had a strong geographical centre, the City of Sigil, resolving a flaw in the Spelljammer setting that denied players a good home base".

=== Dungeons & Dragons (3rd edition) ===
The Spelljammer line of products was discontinued by TSR before they were acquired by Wizards of the Coast in 1997.

In May 2002, Paizo published an article for Spelljammer in Dungeon #92 titled "Spelljammer: Shadow of the Spider Moon". Using the D20 system, it provided new rules for firearms and spelljamming, as well as skills, feats and prestige classes. Spelljammer monsters such as neogi and giff were not used. Instead, it featured creatures from the Monster Manual such as drow, formians and yuan-ti.

In May 2005, Wizards of the Coast updated the neogi to the 3.5 edition rules in the supplement Lords of Madness (2005). The book included a chapter with a sample map of a crashed Spelljamming vessel, cultural habits of the neogi, and the monster's stat blocks.

=== Dungeons & Dragons (4th edition) ===
A Spelljammer homage appears in the 4th edition Manual of the Planes; the sourcebook highlights Spelljammer ships as one method of traveling between planes and provides information for in-game use of Spelljammer vessels.

=== Dungeons & Dragons (5th edition) ===
Spelljammer content also appears in the 5th Edition adventure module Waterdeep: Dungeon of the Mad Mage (2018). In the adventure, a spelljamming ship and its illithid captain appear stranded in level 19 of the titular dungeon. Then in October 2021, Wizards released the PDF Travelers of the Multiverse which is part of the "Unearthed Arcana" public playtest series. Of the six player races it included, four races (autognome, giff, hadozee, and plasmoid) are closely associated with the Spelljammer setting. Both Polygon and Bleeding Cool highlighted that this playtest could indicate a future Spelljammer reboot.

Wizards of the Coast released a new boxed set titled Spelljammer: Adventures in Space on August 16, 2022; this release updates the Spelljammer setting for the 5th Edition. The box set includes a Dungeon Master's screen, a double-sided poster map and three 64-page hardcover books: Astral Adventurer's Guide (a Dungeon Master guide), Boo's Astral Menagerie (a bestiary), and Light of Xaryxis (an adventure module). A special edition, with cover art by Hydro74, was also released. A prequel adventure module, titled Spelljammer Academy, was released for free on the Wizards of the Coast website and on D&D Beyond in July of the same year.

Monstrous Compendium Vol 1: Spelljammer Creatures introduced ten creatures from the Spelljammer setting to the 5th Edition in April 2022.

== Fictional setting ==
=== Spelljamming helms ===
Spelljamming helms are the central setting concept which allow interplanetary and interstellar space travel for vessels which would otherwise not be spaceworthy, in the form of a helm. Any spellcaster may sit on a spelljammer helm to move the ship. The mysterious race known as the Arcane is the sole manufacturer and distributor of spelljamming helms. Within the Dungeons & Dragons universe, they are a method of converting magical energy into motive power.

=== Gravity and air ===
All bodies of a sufficiently large size have gravity. This gravity usually (but not always) exerts a force equal to the standard gravitational attraction on the surface of an Earth-sized planetary body. Gravity in the Spelljammer universe is also an exceptionally convenient force, and almost always works such that "down" orients itself in a manner most humanoids would find sensible.

All bodies of any size carry with them an envelope of air whenever they leave the surface of a planet or other stellar object. Unlike real-world astrophysics, this air envelope is not dispersed by the vacuum of space. These bubbles of air provide breathable atmosphere for varying lengths of time, but 3 months is considered "standard".

=== Crystal spheres ===
A crystal sphere (also known as a crystal shell) is a gigantic spherical shell which contains an entire planetary system. Each sphere varies in size but typically they are twice the diameter of the orbit of the planet that is farthest from the sun or planet at the center of the sphere (the system's primary).

The surface of the sphere is called the "sphere wall" and separates the void of "wildspace" (within the sphere) from the "phlogiston" (that surrounds and flows outside the sphere). The sphere wall has no gravity and appears to be impossible to damage by any normal or magical means. Openings in the sphere wall called "portals" allow spelljamming ships or wildspace creatures to pass through and enter or exit from a crystal sphere. Portals can spontaneously open and close anywhere on the sphere wall. Magical spells (or magical items that reproduce their effects) can allow a portal to be located. Other magic can open a new portal or collapse an existing one. Ships or creatures passing through a portal when it closes may be cut in two.

Unlike the Ptolemaic system, the crystal spheres are not nested within each other.

=== Wildspace ===
Wildspace is similar to the outer space of science fiction, with planets, asteroids and stars, but with different physics. Gravity is either none or the same as that of Earth, and is directed towards the center of planet-sized bodies; on large objects in space like spacecraft and enormous creatures gravity is directed towards a flat plane running through the object's long axis, allowing characters to stand on the decks of ships.

=== The Phlogiston ===
The phlogiston is essentially a big ocean of a unique element that is neither air, fire, water, or earth. The phlogiston (also known as "the Flow") is a bright, extremely combustible gas-like medium that exists between the Crystal Spheres. A signature property of the substance is that it does not exist within the boundaries of a crystal sphere, to the degree that it cannot be brought into a crystal sphere by any known means up to and including the direct will of deities. Every crystal sphere floats in the phlogiston, very slowly bobbing up and down over time. Travel between Crystal Spheres is facilitated by the formation of "Flow rivers" — sections of the phlogiston which have a current and greatly reduce travel time. Travel through the "slow flow" (i.e. off the Flow rivers) is possible, but very dangerous.

=== The Spelljammer ===
The Spelljammer is a legendary ship which looks like a gigantic manta ray, and houses an entire city on its back. All spacefarers (people who live in wildspace) have heard of the Spelljammer but very few have ever seen it themselves. It is this ship that gives its name to "spelljamming", "spelljamming helms" and anything else connected with spelljamming. The ship has been reported to have been seen in countless spheres for as long as records go back. Even some groundlings (people who live on planets that have very little or no commerce with spelljamming communities) have legends about it. There are hundreds of conflicting legends about this ship, and a mythology has developed about the ship that is similar to the legends surrounding The Flying Dutchman.

As a living thing (although it does not consume any matter, it does absorb heat and light through its ventral (or under) side and uses them to produce air and food for its inhabitants), the Spelljammer has a complex life cycle and means of procreation. Normally the ship has no captain and wanders the cosmos seemingly aimlessly. When the Spelljammer has a captain, obtained through another complex process, it will create Smalljammers (miniature versions of the Spelljammer) that go forth as its spawn. Apparently there can only be one Spelljammer at any one time. One Smalljammer will mature into a full Spelljammer ship if its predecessor is ever destroyed.

=== Races ===
Alien races inhabiting the Spelljammer universe included humans, dwarves, xenophobic beholders, rapacious neogi, militant giff (humanoid hippopotami), centaurlike dracons, hubristic elf armadas, spacefaring orcs called "scro", mysterious arcane, the Thri-kreen insectoids, and bumbling tinker gnomes. Illithids were another major race, but were presented as more mercantile and less overtly evil than in other D&D settings. The Monstrous Compendium series added many more minor races. The simian Hadozee were also introduced into the setting, and later incorporated into the 3.5 rules in the supplemental book Stormwrack.

== Official products ==
Spelljammer has acted as the official campaign setting for multiple Dungeons & Dragons roleplaying adventure modules, sourcebooks and accessories.

Title	Year	ISBN	Notes
AD&D box sets
Spelljammer: AD&D Adventures in Space	1989	0-88038-762-9	Introduced the setting and provided the basic rules for spelljamming travel.
The Legend of Spelljammer	1991	1-56076-083-4	Expanded on the setting, in particular the Spelljammer itself.
The War Captain's Companion	1992	1-56076-343-4	Provided more detailed ship-to-ship combat rules.
The Astromundi Cluster	1993	1-56076-632-8	Provided a roleplaying campaign for the setting.
AD&D accessories
Lost Ships	1990	0-88038-831-5	Expanded the number of ships.
Practical Planetology	1991	1-56076-134-2	Assisted DMs who wished to create their own spelljamming setting.
The Rock of Bral	1992	1-56076-345-0	Provided a home base for adventuring parties.
Realmspace	1991	1-56076-052-4	Information about the crystal spheres housing TSR's three main campaign worlds.
Greyspace	1992	1-56076-348-5	Information about the crystal spheres housing TSR's three main campaign worlds.
Krynnspace	1993	1-56076-560-7	Information about the crystal spheres housing TSR's three main campaign worlds.
MC7 Monstrous Compendium Spelljammer Appendix	1990		Part of the Monstrous Compendium series
MC9 Monstrous Compendium Spelljammer Appendix II	1991		Part of the Monstrous Compendium series
Complete Spacefarer's Handbook	1992	1-56076-347-7	Focuses on spelljamming travel.
AD&D adventure modules
Wildspace	1990	0-88038-819-6	A series of five connected adventure modules.
Skull & Crossbows	1990	0-88038-845-5	A series of five connected adventure modules.
Crystal Spheres	1990	0-88038-878-1	A series of five connected adventure modules.
Under the Dark Fist	1991	1-56076-131-8	A series of five connected adventure modules.
Goblins' Return	1991	1-56076-149-0	A series of five connected adventure modules.
Heart of the Enemy	1992	1-56076-342-6	A longer campaign module.
Space Lairs	1993	1-56076-609-3	Adventure anthology.
D&D 5th Edition
Spelljammer Academy	July 2022		Adventure module released digitally.
Spelljammer: Adventures in Space	August 2022		Boxed set which contains three 64-page hardcover books: Astral Adventurer's Guide (a Dungeon Master guide), Boo's Astral Menagerie (a bestiary), and Light of Xaryxis (an adventure module).

== In other media ==
=== Comics ===
Sixteen comics set in the Spelljammer universe were published by DC Comics between September 1990 and November 1991 with the creative team of Barbara Kesel as writer, and Michael Collins, Dan Panosian, and other contributors. The first appearance was in TSR Worlds Annual #1, where the Jammers were introduced in a third of the 72-page book. Two weeks later, their own title went on sale, but both comics have a shelf date of September, 1990. Spelljammer comics also uses Jasmine, a winged human character originally introduced from Forgotten Realms comics, as one of the lead characters.

=== Music ===
Wizards of the Coast released a soundtrack, titled Spelljams, for Spelljammer: Adventures in Space digitally on August 16, 2022; each song on the soundtrack corresponds with one of the chapters in the adventure module Light of Xaryxis.

=== Novels ===
Six novels set in the Spelljammer universe were published by TSR, before TSR was incorporated into Wizards of the Coast. The novels were interconnected and formed "The Cloakmaster Cycle". The novels tell the story of Teldin Moore, a 'groundling' farmer on Krynn who has a powerful and apparently cursed magical cloak that was given to him. He then ends up on a quest, which takes him first into wildspace and then away from his home sphere to distant crystal spheres. The series showcases the wonders and perils of the Spelljammer universe. The novels are now out of print.

- Beyond the Moons by David Cook, (July, 1991) (ISBN 1-56076-153-9)
- Into the Void by Nigel Findley, (October, 1991) (ISBN 1-56076-154-7)
- The Maelstrom's Eye by Roger E. Moore, (May, 1992) (ISBN 1-56076-344-2)
- The Radiant Dragon by Elaine Cunningham, (November, 1992) (ISBN 1-56076-346-9)
- The Broken Sphere by Nigel Findley, (May, 1993) (ISBN 1-56076-596-8)
- The Ultimate Helm by Russ T. Howard, (September, 1993) (ISBN 1-56076-651-4)

In June 2024, Memory's Wake (ISBN 9780593723210) by Django Wexler was published by Random House.

=== Computer games ===
The only Spelljammer computer game ever produced was Spelljammer: Pirates of Realmspace, published by SSI in 1992.

In 2002 a team of freelance game modification developers created "The Arcane Space Tileset" for Neverwinter Nights. This tileset included Spelljamming ships, space and atmospheric terrains, along with monsters and NPCs, all set within the Spelljammer Campaign setting.

=== Web series ===
Legends of the Multiverse is an official actual play streaming series broadcast on the Dungeons & Dragons channels which premiered on April 27, 2022 and is set in the Spelljammer campaign setting. It stars Deborah Ann Woll, B. Dave Walters, Gina Darling, Meagan Kenreck, and Todd Kenreck. It will also feature guest stars such as Brennan Lee Mulligan, Aabria Iyengar, Ginny Di, Anna Prosser, Deejay Knight, Emme Montgomery, Travis McElroy, SungWon Cho, and Jim Zub.

== Reception ==
In the January 1990 edition of Games International (issue #12), James Wallis was not a fan of the initial release, Spelljammer: AD&D Adventures in Space, finding inconsistencies in the combat rules, saying that the cumulative effect of these inconsistencies is to make space combat unplayable. He did find the background "imaginative and consistent", but very little of it. Although he admired the production values of the components, he found the book disorganized to the point of "disarray and confusion". He concluded by giving the game a poor rating of only 2 out of 5, saying that "Spelljammer may score well physically but fails mentally [...] Scavenging AD&D players who enjoy stripping tasty ideas from the carcasses of dying games may find it of interest, but I cannot recommend it to anyone else".

Alexander Sowa, for CBR in October 2021, commented that Spelljammer should be one of the classic settings Wizards of the Coast brings back for the 5th Edition. Sowa wrote that "players have been asking for Spelljammer to be introduced to 5e since the release of the first setting sourcebook. Wizards tossed them a bone with the Dream of The Blue Veil spell added in Tasha's Cauldron of Everything, but it's not a replacement for the niche Spelljammer previously filled. It's not just a way to travel between different campaign settings; it's a simultaneous fulfillment of sci-fi and fantasy dreams of exploration, venturing deep into unknown depths and contending with the strange and otherworldly".

Spelljammer was #3 on The Gamer's 2022 "The 8 Best Dungeons & Dragons Settings Ever" list — the article states that "Spelljammer is one of the most unique settings on this list, with endless possibilities brought up in its planet-hopping realms. The Spelljammer setting can almost best be surmised as 'pirates meets sci-fi fantasy' with its blend of magical worlds and galaxy-traversing galleons". In a separate article for The Gamer, in February 2022, Paul DiSalvo commented that "while D&D's second edition was home to a wide range of Spelljammer books including several adventure modules, the setting has since faded into obscurity, with it not being prominently featured within the game's third, fourth, and fifth editions".

In his 2023 book Monsters, Aliens, and Holes in the Ground, RPG historian Stu Horvath called the game "gloriously bewildering." Horvath also noted the new edition being launched for the 5th edition of D&D, commenting "I can't imagine something so weird as the original coming out today — the new version already seems different, a little less odd, a little more formulaic."
