= Boretti =

Boretti is a surname. Notable people with the surname include:

- Brett Boretti (born 1971), American baseball coach
- Stian Boretti (born 1981), Norwegian tennis player
