= Spelljammer: AD&D Adventures in Space =

Boxed set campaign setting by Jeff Grubb

- The Spelljammer boxed set
- Genre: Role-playing game
- Publisher: TSR, Inc.
- Publication date: 1989
- Media type: Boxed set

Spelljammer: AD&D Adventures in Space is a 1989 boxed set accessory for the Spelljammer campaign setting, part of the Advanced Dungeons & Dragons (AD&D) fantasy role-playing game. It supplies rules and materials for playing AD&D in space. The set was well received by critics and fans.

== Contents ==
The Spelljammer boxed set describes rules for conducting AD&D campaigns in fantasy space. The "Lorebook of the Void" booklet details space travel, commonly known types of ships, and races and creatures found in space. The "Concordance of Arcane Space" details how to conduct fantasy combat in space, and contains rules for spaceships and travel, and variations on existing game rules for playing in space. The set includes cardstock sheets which contain both descriptions and deck plans for different kinds ships, and counters to be used for simulating ship-to-ship combat. The set's large color maps show two cities that float in space, a grid for space combat, and a map that depicts the space between the worlds of the Greyhawk, Forgotten Realms, and Dragonlance campaign settings, which allows player characters to travel between the planets of these settings. The set also includes guidelines on how to conduct space campaigns, as well as campaign setting material.

The set details the Spelljammer helm, which any spellcasting character can use to pilot a ship through space. There setting has two forms of outer space: "wildspace", which is similar to the outer space of science-fiction with some alterations to its physics, and the "phlogiston", essentially a vast ocean filled with a unique element in which many vast crystal spheres float around. The set includes systems to allow players to design starships, and also on how to perform celestial navigation, and also includes visual displays to show planetary systems. It provides simple mechanics, counters, ship displays, and a map display that can be used for tactical engagements between ships; all of these are to supplement role-playing, and not to function as a stand-alone board game. The tactical engagement system includes 8½" × 11" cardstock displays that depict 11 types of starships, each with a color illustration of the ship and a summary of its tactical combat features on one side, and keyed deck plans on the reverse. The elves of the Spelljammer campaign have become its largest political and military presence after destroying all the interstellar orcs and goblins. Dwarves use huge asteroids to travel through space, which are honeycombed with tunnels. The lizard men and tinker gnomes (from the Dragonlance setting) are available for use as player characters; the beholder and the mind flayer appear as prominent foes, along with a new race, the neogi. The set provides color fold-out maps of both the enormous and legendary Spelljammer, a starship shaped like a manta-ray which is a quarter-mile long with a half-mile wingspan, as well as and the Rock of Bral, an asteroid that serves as a port for merchants and pirates.

== Publication history ==
Spelljammer was written by Jeff Grubb, with cover art by Jeff Easley and interior covers and illustrations by Jim Holloway, and was published by TSR in 1989 as a boxed set. The set included two 96-page softbound books, four full-color 22x34 map/displays, 20 color card-stock reference displays, and four colorful card-stock cut-out counter sheets.

== Reception ==
In the January 1990 edition of Games International (Issue 12), James Wallis was not a fan of the set, finding inconsistencies in the combat rules, saying, "The cumulative effect of these inconsistencies is to make space combat unplayable." He did find the background "imaginative and consistent, but unfortunately there is little of it." Although he admired the production values of the components, he found the book disorganized to the point of "disarray and confusion." He concluded by giving the game a poor rating of only 2 out of 5, saying, "Spelljammer may score well physically but fails mentally [...] Scavenging AD&D players who enjoy stripping tasty ideas from the carcasses of dying games may find it of interest, but I cannot recommend it to anyone else."

Ken Rolston reviewed the Spelljammer supplement for Dragon magazine #154 (February 1990). According to Rolston, the color cover of the Concordance of Arcane Space booklet "is the perfect visual precis of the epic themes of the Spelljammer role-playing universe", with its depiction of a Spelljamming ship ("a combination of a Greek war galley, Jules Verne's Nautilus, and a mammoth exotic tropical fish") and "a swashbuckling, eye-patched fantasy pirate" with a wounded mind flayer lying at his feet. He calls the gameplay physics "cheap-and-cheerful, tailor-made for swashbuckling AD&D fantasy action, with original and simple concepts that are also enormously flexible, with an appealing internal fantasy logic". The adventure and campaign potential for using the Spelljammer set "can only be measured in tons". Rolston compares the Spelljammer set to the Space: 1889 and Shadowrun games reviewed in the same column, stating that they are both "original and exciting, but they are likely to appeal to more experienced, sophisticated role-players" and "require mastery of unfamiliar game systems", but because Spelljammer is part of the AD&D game, "few new mechanics need to be mastered, and they're based on ever-so-familiar AD&D system conventions". Rolston concludes that "The Spelljammer set is a perfect evolution of the big, flexible, open-ended, and fun-loving elements of AD&D role-playing adventure. [...] The tone, objectives, and spirit are just right for its audience and purpose. The presentation is colorful and wonderfully imaginative" and "the rules and game concepts are simple, open-ended, and unpretentious, in keeping with the best traditions of AD&D role-playing, and remarkably comprehensive without intimidating in volume and detail." He writes "The Spelljammer set is a gloriously silly idea executed with spirit and imagination."

The Spelljammer set was a Gamer's Choice award-winner.

In his 1991 book Heroic Worlds, Lawrence Schick describes the Spelljammer setting as seen in the boxed set: "forget about science, because this is fantasy space: there's a magical cosmology that creates strange planetary systems, bizarre spaceships that move by magical propulsion, and space zones where spells behave in strange ways".

DieHard GameFan said that "Spelljammer is just such a fun and fantastic idea and along with Planescape and Ravenloft, it remains one of my three big campaign settings for Advanced Dungeons & Dragons and is a big part of why 2e is my favorite version of D&D."

== Reviews ==
- Jeux & Stratégie nouvelle formule #5
- Review: Challenge #43 (1990)
