= The X-Potential =

1987 superhero role-playing game adventure

- Cover art by Mike Machlan and John Statema
- Publishers: TSR
- Publication: 1987
- Genres: Superhero RPG
- Systems: Marvel Super Heroes

The X-Potential is an adventure published by TSR in 1987 for the Marvel Super Heroes role-playing game. It is the second in a four-part series set in a dystopian version of the Marvel universe.

== Contents ==
The first book of the series, Nightmares of Futures Past, describes a bleak alternate future where mutants are hunted down by huge robot Sentinels and imprisoned in concentration camps. As critic James Wallis noted, in a change from most Marvel Super Heroes adventures, the player characters are not fighting crime but fighting for their lives.

The X-Potential is the first of three adventures set in this bleak future. It adds more details of the world, then describes the events that will happen around a large political demonstration over several days. The players are free to intervene as they see fit. At various times, the gamemaster supplies them with front pages of "The Daily Journal".

== Publication history ==
After acquiring the license to produce a role-playing game based on the Marvel Comics universe, TSR first published Marvel Super Heroes in 1984, and followed with many adventures and supplements. One of these was MX2 The X-Potential, a 32-page book published in 1987 with tabloid sheets and an outer folder. It was written by Mark Acres, with cover art by Mike Machlan and John Statema

TSR published a further two adventures in the series: Reap the Whirlwind, and Flames of Doom.
