= Aztlan (Shadowrun) =

Role-playing game supplement

Aztlan is supplement published by FASA in 1995 for the cyberpunk role-playing game Shadowrun.

== Contents ==
Aztlan, written by Nigel Findley, details the nation of Aztlan for the Shadowrun setting. Aztlan features a mix of Aztec mythology, cybertech and corporate crime, with chapters on corporate security, religion, fashion, and history.

== Reception ==
In the December 1995 edition of Dragon (Issue #224), Rick Swan thought the blend of Aztec and cyberpunk culture was deft. He found the chapter on religion was "especially good". Swan concluded that this book was "One of the late Nigel Findley's best."

== Reviews ==
- Australian Realms #25
