= Thomas Baxa =

American artist

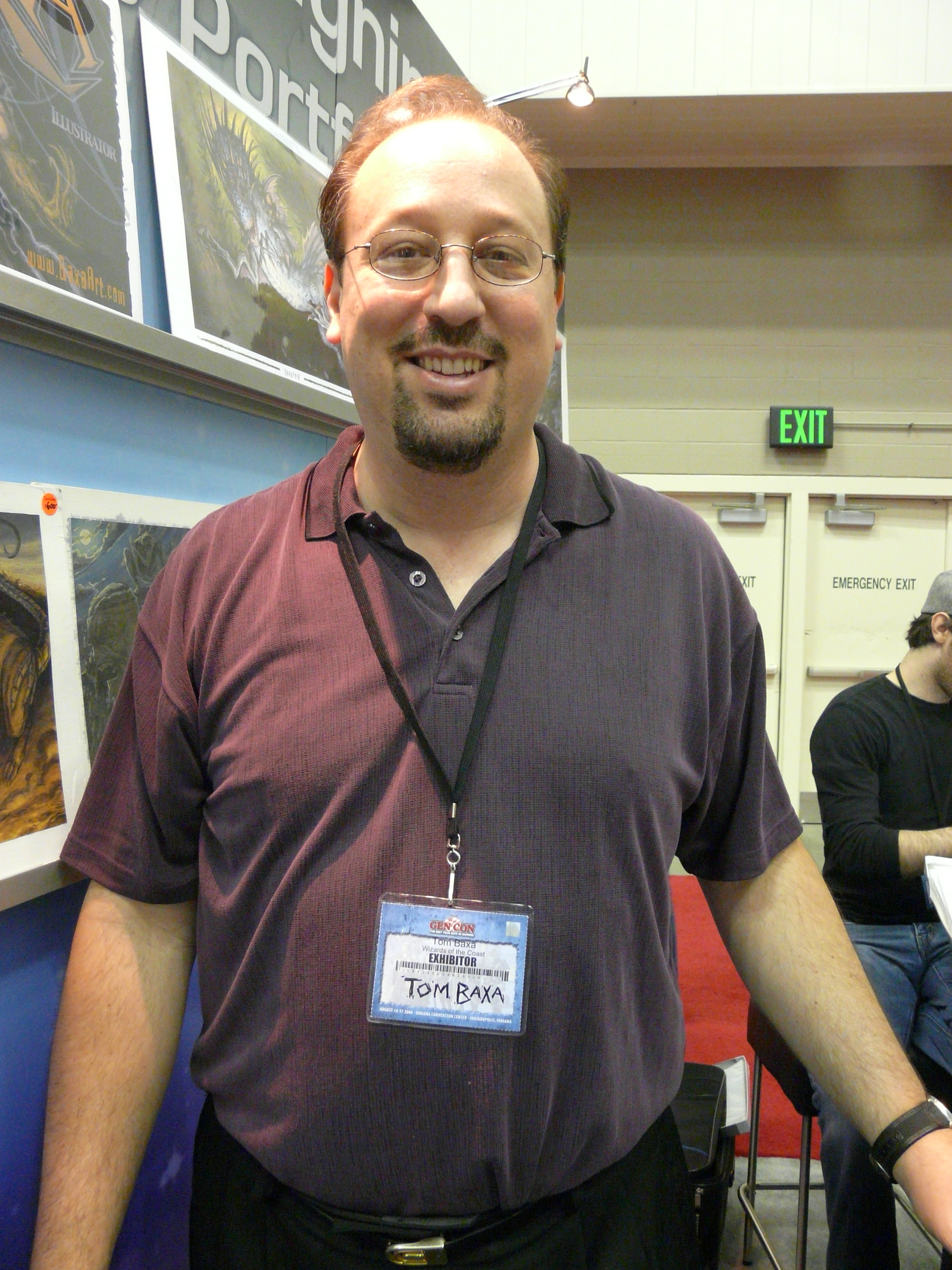
- Tom Baxa at Gen Con Indy 2008
- Known for: Fantasy art

Thomas M. Baxa is an artist whose work has appeared in role-playing games.

== Biography ==
Tom Baxa grew up in the suburbs of Chicago. He enrolled at Northern Illinois University, where he studied under comic and fantasy artist Mark Nelson.

== Works ==
Tom Baxa has continued to produce interior illustrations for many Dungeons & Dragons books and Dragon magazine since 1989, as well as cover art for Realmspace (1991), Greyspace (1992), Swamplight (1993), and Forest Maker. He has also produced artwork for many other games including Teenage Mutant Ninja Turtles & Other Strangeness (Palladium Books), Torg (West End Games), GURPS (Steve Jackson Games), Shadowrun and Earthdawn (FASA Corporation), and illustrated cards for the Magic: The Gathering collectible card game.

Baxa was the Artist Guest of Honor for Gen Con Indy 2010.

== Reception ==
In his 2023 book Monsters, Aliens, and Holes in the Ground, RPG historian Stu Horvath reviewed the fantasy role-playing game Dark Sun and noted, "The art of fantasy illustrators Gerald Brom and Tom Baxa tie together this aesthetic-first high concept ... the art of Brom and Baxa distills and transmits the themes of the setting without players having to read a single word of the boxed set. ... Baxa's interiors add to this a jagged, mutated sensibility. Together, [Brom and Baxa] fix the world of Athas as blasted, red, parched, sweaty, and hostile in the minds of players."
