= Kanawa Personal Weapons =

1991 role-playing supplement for Torg

Kanawa Personal Weapons is a 1991 role-playing supplement for Torg published by West End Games.

== Contents ==
Kanawa Personal Weapons is a supplement in which technology is presented from early firearms to implanted cyberlimb weapons.

== Reception ==
S. John Ross reviewed The Kanawa Personal Weapons Catalog in White Wolf #29 (Oct./Nov., 1991), rating it a 2 out of 5 and stated that "In general, the fault for the problems with the Kanawa Personal Weapons Catalog does not lie with the author. Focus on graphics over content (a sad and overwhelming industry trend) is embarrassing. The illusion of a catalog (a thing of dubious value) carries over fairly well, but the book could have easily been half the present size, or could have contained twice as many items."

== Reviews ==
- Casus Belli #69
