= The Ruins of Myth Drannor =

Role-playing game supplement

- Genre: Role-playing games
- Publisher: TSR
- Publication date: 1993
- Media type: Boxed set

The Ruins of Myth Drannor is an accessory for the 2nd edition of the Advanced Dungeons & Dragons fantasy role-playing game, published in 1993.

== Contents ==
The boxed set provides information on the city of Myth Drannor, which is both "terribly dangerous" as well as "integral to the history of the Forgotten Realms". The set has many rules, especially for the magic environment which changes often during gameplay and which dungeon masters (DMs) must monitor. The product is for experienced DMs and players.

It provides "much of the ancient history of Faerun, and describes what can be found there today". According to John Setzer

The artwork is good and new. Standard TSR Monstrous Compendium pages are included, as well as very helpful information cards and four-color maps. Two books cover general information and a few adventures.

== Publication history ==
The Ruins of Myth Drannor was written by Ed Greenwood and published by TSR.

== Reception ==
John Setzer reviewed the supplement in White Wolf Magazine No. 40. Out of a possible 5, he rated the product 2 for value, 3 for playability and appearance, and 5 for concepts and complexity. Overall, he rated the book 3.5 out of 5.

== Reviews ==
- Australian Realms #19
