= List of GURPS books =

A rough breakdown of GURPS books. Bottom tier are core books necessary to play, moving up to least necessary. Using resources from further up the stack requires less preparation work on the part of the game master.

This is a listing of the publications from Steve Jackson Games and other licensed publishers for the GURPS role-playing game.

== Fourth edition ==
=== Core books ===
- GURPS Basic Set: Characters (2004)
- GURPS Basic Set: Campaigns (2004)
- GURPS GM's Screen

==== Free core books ====
- GURPS Lite (2004)
- GURPS Ultra-Lite (2009) GURPS rules condensed to a single page, and released as a free PDF.
- GURPS Update. A conversion guide from 3rd to 4th edition, and released as a free PDF. It is also included in the GM's screen.

=== Rules supplements ===
These books detail general rules not used in all possible campaign, such as rules for magic spells, for superpowers and for martial arts, and also state-based treatments of cities, military units and other organizations.

- GURPS Boardroom and Curia (PDF) by Matt Rigsby
- GURPS City Stats (PDF) by William H. Stoddard
- GURPS Gun Fu (PDF) by S. A. Fisher, Sean Punch, and Hans-Christian Vortisch
- GURPS Magic (2006) Expanded rules from the Basic set, detailing spells, and rules for alternative magic systems, magic item creation, alchemy.
- GURPS Martial Arts (2008) by Peter Dell'Orto. Includes new perks, skills, techniques, styles, weapons, and extended combat and injury rules, as well as history on the martial arts, pregenerated NPCs, and ideas for martial-arts campaigns.
- GURPS Mass Combat (PDF), by David Pulver Rules for large-scale battles between military units, as well as allowing for the actions of player characters.
- GURPS Powers (2007) by Sean Punch
- GURPS Realm Management (PDF) by Christopher R. Rice
- GURPS Social Engineering (PDF) by William H. Stoddard
  - GURPS Social Engineering: Back to School (PDF) by William H. Stoddard
  - GURPS Social Engineering: Pulling Rank (PDF) by Sean Punch
  - 'GURPS Social Engineering: Keeping in Contact (PDF) by Kelly Pedersen
- GURPS Tactical Shooting by Hans-Christian Vortisch
- GURPS Thaumatology (2008) by Phil Masters. Extends the magic rules, adding ceremonial, spirit-based, runic, freeform and material (alchemy, herbalism).
  - GURPS Thamatology: Age of Gold (PDF)
  - GURPS Thaumatology: Chinese Elemental Powers (PDF) by William H. Stoddard
  - GURPS Thaumatology: Magical Styles (PDF) by Sean Punch
  - GURPS Magical Styles: Dungeon Magic (PDF) by Sean Punch
  - GURPS Magical Styles: Horror Magic (PDF) by Sean Punch
  - GURPS Thaumatology: Ritual Path Magic (PDF) by Jason "PK" Levine
  - GURPS Thaumatology: Sorcery (PDF) by Jason "PK" Levine
  - GURPS Sorcery: Sound Spells (PDF)
  - GURPS Thaumatology: Urban Magics (PDF) by William H. Stoddard

=== Power-Ups ===
These supplements add a small set of new abilities for characters.

- GURPS Power-Ups 1: Imbuements (PDF)
- GURPS Power-Ups 2: Perks (PDF)
- GURPS Power-Ups 3: Talents (PDF)
- GURPS Power-Ups 4: Enhancements (PDF)
- GURPS Power-Ups 5: Impulse Buys (PDF)
- GURPS Power-Ups 6: Quirks (PDF)
- GURPS Power-Ups 7: Wildcards (PDF)
- GURPS Power-Ups 8: Limitations (PDF)
- GURPS Power-Ups 9: Alternate Attributes (PDF)

=== Creatures ===
==== Aliens ====
- GURPS Aliens: Sparrials (PDF)

==== Creatures of the Night ====
These handbooks describe monsters and creatures. All volumes are written by Jason "PK" Levine and Scott Paul Maykrantz; volumes 1-4 illustrated by Scott Paul Maykrantz.

- GURPS Creatures of the Night, Volume 1 (PDF)
- GURPS Creatures of the Night, Volume 2 (PDF)
- GURPS Creatures of the Night, Volume 3 (PDF)
- GURPS Creatures of the Night, Volume 4 (PDF)
- GURPS Creatures of the Night, Volume 5 (PDF), illustrated by Dan Smith (artist)

==== Dragons ====
- GURPS Dragons (3rd Edition with 4th Edition appendix) by Phil Masters, illustrated by Alex Fernandez

==== Fantasy Folk ====
- GURPS Fantasy Folk: Elves (PDF) by Alden Loveshade
- GURPS Fantasy Folk: Goblins and Hobgoblins (PDF) by Phil Masters
- GURPS Fantasy Folk: Kobolds (PDF) by Phil Masters
- GURPS Fantasy Folk: The Reptilian Races (PDF) by Phil Masters
- GURPS Fantasy Folk: Winged Folk (PDF) by Anders Starmark

=== Technology and equipment ===
These handbooks describe the data, in terms of GURPS, of specific objects, gadgets and vehicles, and how to construct new ones.

- GURPS Bio-Tech, second edition, by David Pulver and David Morgan-Mar describes medical techniques and enhancements, and modified life forms.
- GURPS High-Tech, second edition, by Hans-Christian Vortisch, S.A. Fisher and Michael Hurst, describes technologies from the invention of gunpowder to the present day.
- GURPS Low-Tech, second edition, by William H. Stoddard, Matt Riggsby, Peter V. Dell'Orto and Dan Howard
- GURPS Ultra-Tech, second edition, by David Pulver describes futuristic technologies.

==== Spaceships ====
Written by David Pulver.

- GURPS Spaceships (PDF) - describes the basic design and combat system.
- GURPS Spaceships 2: Traders, Liners, and Transports (PDF) - concentrates on the economics of merchant spacecraft.
- GURPS Spaceships 3: Warships and Space Pirates (PDF)
- GURPS Spaceships 4: Fighters, Carriers, and Mecha (PDF)
- GURPS Spaceships 5: Exploration and Colony Spacecraft (PDF)
- GURPS Spaceships 6: Mining and Industrial Spacecraft (PDF)
- GURPS Spaceships 7: Strange and Alien Spacecraft (PDF)
- GURPS Spaceships 8: Transhuman Spacecraft (PDF) - spacecraft taken from the Transhuman Space setting

=== Genre toolkits ===
These books describe how to design and play campaigns in a particular genre, such as fantasy, science fiction or detective fiction.

- GURPS Horror
- GURPS Mysteries PDF and POD

GURPS Space

- GURPS Supers
- GURPS Steampunk

These genre sourcebooks are all written by Phil Masters:

- GURPS Steampunk 1: Settings and Style (PDF)
- GURPS Steampunk 2: Steam and Shellfire (PDF)
- GURPS Steampunk 3: Soldiers and Scientists (PDF)
- GURPS Steampunk Setting: The Broken Clockwork World (PDF)
- GURPS Vehicles: Steampunk Conveyances (PDF)

=== Hot Spots and Locations ===
==== Hot Spots ====
- GURPS Hot Spots: Constantinople, 527-1204 A.D (PDF) by Matt Riggsby
- GURPS Hot Spots: Istanbul, 1453-1703 A.D. (PDF) by Matt Riggsby
- GURPS Hot Spots: Renaissance Florence (PDF) by Matt Riggsby
- GURPS Hot Spots: Renaissance Venice (PDF) by Matt Riggsby
- GURPS Hot Spots: Sriwijaya (PDF) by Randy Huegele
- GURPS Hot Spots: The Incense Trail (PDF) by Matt Riggsby
- GURPS Hot Spots: The Silk Road (PDF) by Matt Riggsby

==== Locations ====
- Hellsgate
- Metro of Madness
- St. George's Cathedral
- The Tower of Octavius
- Worminghall

=== Original fictional settings ===
These supplements details how to design and play campaigns set in particular fictional settings, either specific to GURPS (such as "Banestorm", a fantasy setting, or "Infinite Worlds", about exploration of parallel universes) or independent of it (such as the Star Trek universe).

==== Infinite Worlds ====
- GURPS Infinite Worlds. Winner of the 2005 Origins Award for Best Roleplaying Supplement.

- GURPS Infinite Worlds: Atlantropa (PDF) by Joshua Kilburn
- GURPS Infinite Worlds: Britannica-6 (PDF) by Phil Masters
- GURPS Infinite Worlds: Collegio Januari (PDF) by Kenneth Hite
- GURPS Infinite Worlds: I.S.T. (PDF) by Kenneth Hite
- GURPS Infinite Worlds: Lost Worlds (PDF) by Kenneth Hite
- GURPS Infinite Worlds: Nightreign (PDF) by James Amaral and Joshua Lopez
- GURPS Infinite Worlds: Worlds of Atomic Horror (PDF) by Matt Wehmeier
- GURPS Infinite Worlds: Worlds of Horror (PDF) by Kenneth Hite

==== Transhuman Space ====
- Changing Times (PDF) updates the rules for compatibility with GURPS 4th edition. The following supplements are 4th edition-compatible:
  - Transhuman Space: Bioroid Bazaar (PDF)
  - Transhuman Space: Cities on the Edge (PDF)
  - Transhuman Space: Martial Arts 2100 (PDF)
  - Transhuman Space: Personnel Files 2-5 (PDF)
  - Transhuman Space: Shell-Tech (PDF)
  - GURPS Spaceships 8: Transhuman Spacecraft (PDF)
  - Transhuman Space: Transhuman Mysteries (PDF)
  - Transhuman Space: Wings of the Rising Sun (PDF)

==== Other original settings ====
- GURPS Banestorm by Phil Masters and Jonathan Woodward
- GURPS Banestorm: Abydos by David Pulver
- GURPS Horror: The Madness Dossier (PDF) by Kenneth Hite
- GURPS Lands Out of Time (PDF) by Lizard
- GURPS Martial Arts: Gladiators (PDF) by Volker Bach and Peter Dell'Orto
- GURPS Tales of the Solar Patrol (PDF) by Lizard
- GURPS Thaumatology: Age of Gold (PDF) by Phil Masters
- GURPS Thaumatology: Alchemical Baroque (PDF) by Phil Masters
- GURPS Zombies, a post-apocalypse world book first printed December 2013
- GURPS Zombies: Day One first printed April 2015

=== Licensed fictional settings ===
- GURPS Casey and Andy (PDF) - A setting inspired by the Casey and Andy webcomic by Andy Weir.
- GURPS Mars Attacks. Based on Mars Attacks and its adaptations.
- GURPS Prime Directive
  - GURPS Prime Directive: Klingons
  - GURPS Prime Directive: Romulans

- GURPS Traveller: Interstellar Wars
Describes a period of the history of the science fiction Traveller setting, early in its history; includes rules for generating characters for the setting, starship design, interstellar trade, exploration, and ship-to-ship combat.

- Girl Genius Sourcebook and Roleplaying Game, based on the Girl Genius webcomic by Studio Foglio
- Vorkosigan Saga Sourcebook and Roleplaying Game, the sourcebook of Lois McMaster Bujold's Vorkosigan Saga.

=== Action ===
These supplements describe how to reduce GURPS to the essential abilities and rules you need to play in games inspired by action movies of the 1980s and beyond.

- GURPS Action 1: Heroes (PDF)
- GURPS Action 2: Exploits (PDF)
- GURPS Action 3: Furious Fists (PDF)
- GURPS Action 4: Specialists (PDF)
- GURPS Action 5: Dictionary of Danger (PDF)
- GURPS Action 6: Tricked-Out Rides (PDF)
- GURPS Action 7: Mercenaries (PDF)
- GURPS Action 8: Twists (PDF)
- GURPS Action 9: The City (PDF)

=== Monster Hunters ===
These handbooks describe how to reduce GURPS Fourth Edition to the essential abilities and rules needed to play in a typical modern "Monster Hunting" type of game. Example settings include Buffy the Vampire Slayer, or Charles Stross's The Laundry series.

- GURPS Monster Hunters 1: Champions (PDF)
- GURPS Monster Hunters 2: The Mission (PDF)
- GURPS Monster Hunters 3: The Enemy (PDF)
- GURPS Monster Hunters 4: Sidekicks (PDF)
- GURPS Monster Hunters 5: Applied Xenology (PDF)
- GURPS Monster Hunters 6: Holy Hunters (PDF)
- GURPS Monster Hunters Power Ups 1 (PDF)
- GURPS Monster Hunters Encounters 1 (PDF)
- GURPS Loadouts: Monster Hunters (PDF

=== Dungeon Fantasy ===
Steve Jackson Games produces two Dungeon Fantasy lines: GURPS Dungeon Fantasy uses the full GURPS system while the Dungeon Fantasy Roleplaying Game Powered by GURPS uses a modified subset of GURPS rules.

==== Dungeon Fantasy series ====
Providing information for playing a Dungeons & Dragons and/or dungeon crawl-style game or campaign.

- GURPS Dungeon Fantasy 1: Adventurers
- GURPS Dungeon Fantasy 2: Dungeons
- GURPS Dungeon Fantasy 3: The Next Level
- GURPS Dungeon Fantasy 4: Sages
- GURPS Dungeon Fantasy 5: Allies (PDF)
- GURPS Dungeon Fantasy 6: 40 Artifacts (PDF)
- GURPS Dungeon Fantasy 7: Clerics (PDF)
- GURPS Dungeon Fantasy 8: Treasure Tables (PDF)
- GURPS Dungeon Fantasy 9: Summoners (PDF)
- GURPS Dungeon Fantasy 10: Taverns (PDF)
- GURPS Dungeon Fantasy 11: Power-Ups (PDF)
- GURPS Dungeon Fantasy 12: Ninjas (PDF)
- GURPS Dungeon Fantasy 13: Loadouts (PDF)
- GURPS Dungeon Fantasy 14: Psi (PDF)
- GURPS Dungeon Fantasy 15: Henchmen (PDF)
- GURPS Dungeon Fantasy 16: Wilderness Adventures (PDF)
- GURPS Dungeon Fantasy 17: Guilds (PDF)
- GURPS Dungeon Fantasy 18: Power Items (PDF)
- GURPS Dungeon Fantasy 19: Incantation Magic (PDF)
- GURPS Dungeon Fantasy 20: Slayers (PDF)
- GURPS Dungeon Fantasy 21: Megadungeons (PDF)
- GURPS Dungeon Fantasy 22: Gates (PDF)
- GURPS Dungeon Fantasy 23: Twists (PDF)
- GURPS Dungeon Fantasy Career Guide (PDF)
- GURPS Dungeon Fantasy Adventure 1: Mirror of the Fire Demon (PDF)
- GURPS Dungeon Fantasy Adventure 2: Tomb of the Dragon King (PDF)
- GURPS Dungeon Fantasy Adventure 3: Deep Night and the Star (PDF)
- GURPS Dungeon Fantasy Denizens: Barbarians (PDF)
- GURPS Dungeon Fantasy Denizens: Swashbucklers (PDF)
- GURPS Dungeon Fantasy Encounters 1: The Pagoda of Worlds (PDF)
- GURPS Dungeon Fantasy Encounters 2: The Room (PDF)
- GURPS Dungeon Fantasy Encounters 3: The Carnival of Madness (PDF)
- GURPS Dungeon Fantasy Settings 1: Caverntown (PDF)
- GURPS Dungeon Fantasy Settings 2: Cold Shard Mountains (PDF)
- GURPS Dungeon Fantasy Monsters 1 (PDF)
- GURPS Dungeon Fantasy Monsters 2: Icky Goo (PDF)
- GURPS Dungeon Fantasy Monsters 3: Born of Myth & Magic (PDF)
- GURPS Dungeon Fantasy Monsters 4: Dragons (PDF)
- GURPS Dungeon Fantasy Monsters 5: Demons (PDF)
- GURPS Dungeon Fantasy Treasures 1: Glittering Prizes (PDF)
- GURPS Dungeon Fantasy Treasures 2: Epic Treasures (PDF)
- GURPS Dungeon Fantasy Treasures 3: Artifacts of Felltower (PDF)
- GURPS Dungeon Fantasy Treasures 4: Mixed Blessings (PDF)
- GURPS Fantasy-Tech 2: Weapons of Fantasy (PDF)
- GURPS Magical Styles: Dungeon Magic (PDF)
- Pyramid Dungeon Collection (Articles from Pyramid volume 1 and Pyramid volume 2, updated for GURPS Dungeon Fantasy and GURPS Fourth Edition)
- Pyramid: Dungeon Fantasy Collected (Articles from Pyramid volume 3 for GURPS Dungeon Fantasy)

==== Dungeon Fantasy Roleplaying Game ====
- Dungeon Fantasy Roleplaying Game Set Powered by GURPS. A boxed set with five books, two maps, cardboard figures, and dice.

- Adventurers
- Dungeon: I Smell a Rat
- Exploits
- Monsters
- Spells

- Dungeon Fantasy Companion 1 (compiles three stretch goals from the DFRPG Kickstarter)

- Dungeon Fantasy Dungeon: Against the Rat-Men
- Dungeon Fantasy Magic Items
- Dungeon Fantasy Traps

- Dungeon Fantasy Companion 2
- Dungeon Fantasy Dungeon Planner
- Dungeon Fantasy Fantastic Dungeon Grappling (produced by Gaming Ballistic LLC)
- Dungeon Fantasy GM Screen
- Dungeon Fantasy Magic Items 2
- Dungeon Fantasy Monsters 2
- Dungeon Fantasy Shields Up (produced by Gaming Ballistic LLC)
- Dungeon Fantasy Delvers to Grow (produced by Gaming Ballistic LLC)

- Delvers to Grow core book
- Fast Delvers
- Smart Delvers
- Strong Delvers

==== Norðlond Sagas ====
A Viking-inspired setting produced by Gaming Ballistic LLC for the Dungeon Fantasy Roleplaying Game.

- Hall of Judgement
- The Citadel at Norðvörn
- The Dragons of Rosgarth
- Forest's End
- Norðlondr Fólk
- Hand of Asgard
- The Crypt of Krysuvik
- Norðlondr Óvinabókin: Bestiary and Enemies Book
- The Bugstiary: A Norðlondr Bestiary Expansion
- Garden of Evil: A Norðlondr Bestiary Expansion
- Serpents of Legend: A Norðlondr Bestiary Expansion

=== Other free books for 4th Edition ===
There is a total of 28 free GURPS products given out as no-cost PDFs, in addition to the three above and one below, this includes:

1. Infinite Worlds I.S.T.
2. Magic Spell Charts released 15 February 2006
3. Range Ruler
4. Skill Categories released 24 June 2005
5. Alphabet Arcane: Lost Serifs
6. Combat Cards
7. Lite Chinese
8. Lite Interlingua
9. Lite Italian
10. Lite Korean
11. Lite Lithuanian
12. Lite Portuguese
13. Martial Arts Techniques Cheat Sheet
14. Space: Planetary Record and Worksheet
15. Caravan to Ein Arris
16. Caravan to Ein Arris 4th
17. Transhuman Space: Teralogos News - 2100, Fourth Quarter
18. Transhuman Space: Teralogos News - 2101, First Quarter
19. Transhuman Space: Teralogos News - 2101, Second Quarter
20. Transhuman Space: Teralogos News - 2101, Third Quarter
21. Traveller: Flare Star
22. In Nomine: A Very Nybbas Christmas
23. Traveller Interstellar Wars Combat Counters
24. Temple of the Lost Gods PDQ Conversion
25. Advantages: A Compendium of Pregenerated Abilities (A PDF of Player Generated Advantages)

== Third edition ==
=== Core books ===
- GURPS Basic Set, Third Edition, winner of the 1988 Origins Award for Best Roleplaying Rules.
- GURPS Basic Set, Third Edition (Revised)
- GURPS Compendium I
- GURPS Compendium II
- GURPS Lite (still offered for free as PDF on site, and in store)
- GURPS Lite for Transhuman Space is also distributed freely, a copy of pages 207-238 is distributed as a free PDF.

=== Rules supplements ===
- GURPS All-Star Jam 2004
- GURPS Best of Pyramid 1 - First selection of articles from online gaming magazine Pyramid.
- GURPS Best of Pyramid 2
- GURPS Grimoire - A companion volume for GURPS Magic, describing hundreds of spells and two new Colleges, Gates and Techs.
- GURPS Magic (for GURPS 3e)
- GURPS Martial Arts (for GURPS 3e)
- GURPS Players' Book (1988)
- Pulver, David (1995). GURPS Psionics. ISBN 1-55634-196-2.
- Naylor, Janet (1994). GURPS Religion: Gods, Priestly Powers and Cosmic Truths. ISBN 978-1-55634-202-8.

=== Characters and antagonists ===
- GURPS Aliens, a collection of alien races.
- GURPS Fantasy Folk, a collection of fantasy races.
- GURPS Monsters, a collection of 48 monstrous characters including Tiamat, Bigfoot, Dracula, and original creations
- GURPS Rogues, a book of templates
- GURPS Supporting Cast
- GURPS Villains
- GURPS Warriors, a book of templates
- GURPS Who's Who 1, a collection of 52 historical characters including Aristotle, Aaron Burr, Julius Caesar, William Shakespeare, and Nikola Tesla
- GURPS Who's Who 2, a collection of 56 more historical characters
- GURPS Wizards, a book of templates

=== Creatures ===
- GURPS Blood Types, containing biographies and gaming statistics for 23 vampires and vampire-like beings, and guidelines on creating more for various campaign settings.
- Maykrantz, Scott Paul (1994). GURPS Creatures of the Night. ISBN 1-55634-273-X., describing original "modern horrors" (such as "Grue Beetles", "Netherpunks" and "Slitherwens").
- GURPS Dinosaurs, giving game data for dinosaurs.
- GURPS Dragons (3rd Edition with 4th Edition appendix), giving game information and data about dragons, also as player characters.
- Davis, Graeme (2003). GURPS Faerie. ISBN 1-55634-632-8., giving character templates and campaign settings for adventures involving the Little people.
- O'Sullivan, Steffan (1999). GURPS Bestiary (2nd ed.). ISBN 1-55634-184-9., describing several fantasy animals and plants.
- GURPS Shapeshifters, about creation rules, game environments and sample characters for werewolves, Doppelgängers and other shapeshifters.
- GURPS Space Bestiary, describing many fictional extraterrestrial creatures, including silicon-based, crystalline, energy and liquid beings.
- GURPS Spirits, published 2001, a guide to fictional spirits from several cultures (angels, demons, djinn, dryads, ghosts etc.), with a possible system of spirit-based magic. This expands upon the Spirit rules from Undead and the Ritual Magic rules from Voodoo.
- GURPS Undead, published 1998, a portion on the site describing several kinds of undead creatures (vampires, zombies etc.), with rules to create more and related topics.

=== Technology and equipment ===
- GURPS Bio-Tech (for third edition)
- GURPS High-Tech (for third edition)
- GURPS Low-Tech (for third edition) describes technologies and inventions up through the Age of Sail.
- GURPS Magic Items 1
- GURPS Magic Items 2
- GURPS Magic Items 3
- GURPS Modern Firepower
- GURPS Robots
- GURPS Steam-Tech
- GURPS Ultra-Tech 1
- GURPS Ultra-Tech 2
- GURPS Vehicles
- GURPS Vehicles Expansion 1
- GURPS Vehicles Expansion 2
- GURPS Vehicles Lite
- GURPS Warehouse 23

=== Genre toolkits ===
- Paul Elliott and Chris McCubbin (2001). GURPS Atomic Horror. ISBN 1-55634-533-X. - A sourcebook for running campaigns inspired by B-grade science fiction and horror movies of the 1950s.
- Christopher J. Burke and Rob Garitta (1997). GURPS Autoduel. ISBN 1-55634-240-3. - Describes a post-apocalyptic setting also shared by the Car Wars boardgame and the Autoduel computer game in which characters are involved in autoduelling, combat in armed and armored motor vehicles. The sourcebook contains rules for designing vehicles, additional skills used by autoduellist characters, and new technology and social conditions of the world. The setting is extended in an additional set of sourcebooks for the Autoduel world (see below).
- Martha and David Ladyman. GURPS Autoduel: Car Warriors. ISBN 1-55634-081-8. - Pre-generated characters for GURPS Autoduel.
- Brian J. Underhill (2002) [1989]. GURPS Cliffhangers. ISBN 1-55634-589-5. - Sourcebook with background material and rules for adventure tale in the style of 1920s and 1930s pulp fiction.
- Lisa J. Steele (2002). GURPS Cops. ISBN 1-55634-458-9. - A sourcebook to create realistic police officer characters and adventures.
- GURPS Covert Ops
- GURPS Cyberpunk - "The book that was seized by the US Secret Service"
- GURPS Dark Places
- GURPS Espionage
- GURPS Horror.
- GURPS Illuminati, describing the secret societies/conspiracies genre, building on the Illuminati card game, in its turn inspired by Robert Shea and Robert Anton Wilson's The Illuminatus! Trilogy. Winner of the 1992 Origins Award for Best Roleplaying Supplement.
- GURPS Mars
- GURPS Mecha
- GURPS Special Ops
- GURPS Steampunk, winner of the 2000 Origins Award for Best Roleplaying Supplement.
- GURPS Supers
- GURPS SWAT
- GURPS Time Travel, winner of the 1991 Origins Award for Best Roleplaying Supplement.

=== History and culture ===
- Nicholas Caldwell; William H Stoddard (2003). GURPS Age of Napoleon. ISBN 1-55634-451-1., background for adventuring set in the late 18th and early 19th centuries, with character write-ups for such celebrities of the era as Catherine the Great (of Russia) and George Washington as well as Napoleon's crowd.
- GURPS Arabian Nights
- GURPS Atlantis
- Aurelio Locsin III (1993). GURPS Aztecs. ISBN 1-55634-260-8., Mexico before Cortez.
- Robert M. Schroeck; Peggy Schroeck (1991). GURPS Camelot. ISBN 1-55634-199-7., fantasy role-playing in the Arthurian genre.
- Ken Walton; Jo Walton (1995). GURPS Celtic Myth., Once Celts raided, looted, conquered and settled over thousands of miles, leaving red-haired descendants from Ireland to Spain to Poland to Turkey, coming within a sword's width of extinguishing the Roman empire before it was born. They left behind rich and terrible mythos, of head-hunting and of poetry, and, of course, of the Fair Folk, a euphemism in the same vein as the Greeks used when they referred to the Furies as "the kindly ones."
- GURPS China
- GURPS Egypt
- GURPS Greece
- Kirk Wilson Tate (1989). GURPS Ice Age. ISBN 1-55634-134-2., describing rules and setting for role-playing in the time of prehistoric man, including a shamanic magic system.
- GURPS Imperial Rome, describing the historical background and adventure ideas for roleplaying in ancient Rome, including a parallel universe where Roman Empire survived till today.
- GURPS Japan (second edition)
- GURPS Middle Ages I, a sourcebook for running a Middle Ages themed GURPS campaign.
- GURPS Old West
- GURPS Places of Mystery
- GURPS Robin Hood
- GURPS Russia
- Robert Traynor & Lisa Evans (1992). GURPS Scarlet Pimpernel. ISBN 1-55634-212-8., details for playing in the milieu of the Scarlet Pimpernel books set in 18th century Revolutionary France, by Baroness Orczy.
- Steffan O'Sullivan (1990). GURPS Swashbucklers: Roleplaying in the World of Pirates and Musketeers. ISBN 1-55634-394-9., detailed 17th century role-play in the swashbuckler genre, with rules for ship combat, fencing, guns, dueling, codes of honor and so forth.
- GURPS Timeline, a source book with a timeline for play and many short articles, some of which describe "Lost Continents" and some tales about "Lost Fortunes".
- GURPS Vikings

==== World War II ====
- GURPS WWII - Core Rules.
- GURPS WWII: All the King's Men - British and Commonwealth forces.
  - GURPS WWII: Their Finest Hour - Scenario detailing the Battle of Britain.
- GURPS WWII: Dogfaces - United States.
  - GURPS WWII: Leyte Gulf - Scenario detailing the Battle of Leyte Gulf.
- GURPS WWII: Doomed White Eagle - Poland.
- GURPS WWII: Grim Legions - Italy.
- GURPS WWII: Frozen Hell - Finland.
- GURPS WWII: Hand of Steel - Commando forces.
- GURPS WWII: Iron Cross - Greater Germany.
- GURPS WWII: Michael's Army - Romania.
- GURPS WWII: Red Tide - USSR.
- GURPS WWII: Return to Honor - France.
- GURPS WWII: Weird War II - An alternate setting in which Magic, Super-Science, and the Supernatural are real.
  - GURPS Weird War II: The Secret of the Gneisenau - Scenario detailing the Gneisenau.
- GURPS WWII: Motor Pool - Pre-made WW2-era vehicles using the variant WWII Modular Vehicle Design System from the core rulebook.

=== Original fictional Settings ===
==== Fantasy ====
GURPS Fantasy

- GURPS Fantasy II: Adventures in the Mad Lands
- GURPS Fantasy GM's Pack
- GURPS Fantasy Tredroy

==== Horror ====
- GURPS Cabal, a customizable setting depicting a modern-day secret society composed of vampires, lycanthropes and sorcerers who study the underlying principles of magic and visit other planes of existence.
- GURPS CthulhuPunk (1995)
- GURPS Screampunk
- GURPS Voodoo: The Shadow War

==== Space ====
- GURPS Space Atlas
- GURPS Space Atlas 2: The Corporate Worlds
- GURPS Space Atlas 3: The Confederacy
- GURPS Space Atlas 4
- GURPS Terradyne

==== Supers ====
- GURPS I.S.T.: International Super Teams
- GURPS IST Kingston
- GURPS Mixed Doubles, a collection of characters designed to be used with GURPS Supers.
- GURPS Super Scum
- GURPS Supertemps
- GURPS Wild Cards (see below)

- GURPS Aces Abroad

==== Transhuman Space ====
- Bioroid Bazaar (PDF)
- Bio-Tech 2100 (PDF)
- Broken Dreams
- Changing Times (PDF)
- Cities on the Edge (PDF)
- Deep Beyond
- Fifth Wave
- High Frontier
- In The Well
- Martial Arts 2100 (PDF)
- Orbital Decay
- Personnel Files 1
- Personnel Files 2: The Meme Team (PDF)
- Personnel Files 3: Wild Justice (PDF)
- Personnel Files 4: Martingale Security (PDF)
- Personnel Files 5: School Days 2100 (PDF)
- Polyhymnia (PDF)
- Shell-Tech (PDF)
- Singapore Sling (PDF)
- Spacecraft of the Solar System
- Spaceships 8: Transhuman Spacecraft
- Toxic Memes
- Transhuman Mysteries (PDF)
- Under Pressure
- Wings of the Rising Sun (PDF)

==== Other original fictional settings ====
- Kenneth Hite; Craig Neumeier; Michael S. Schiffer (1999). GURPS Alternate Earths. ISBN 1-55634-318-3.—presents six versions of Earth possessing alternate histories to that of our own world, as well as a number of less-detailed settings scattered throughout the book in sidebars: for instance, "Gernsback" is a parallel, inspired by 1930s science fiction adventure stories (it is named for the editor Hugo Gernsback) has as its point of divergence is the marriage of Nikola Tesla to Anne Morgan, daughter of banker and financier J. P. Morgan. Attention is given to the ways in which agents of the Infinity Patrol presented in GURPS Time Travel and their rivals from the mysterious parallel known as "Centrum" attempt to influence the course of history in each parallel; the concept of the conflict between the Infinity Patrol and Centrum across the many parallel Earths was made central to the Fourth Edition of GURPS as the default setting in the Basic Set and in the supplement GURPS Infinite Worlds.
- GURPS Alternate Earths 2 presents six more alternate histories, among which that of Centrum, whose point of divergence is the successful crossing of the White Ship, meaning that William Adelin, the sole male heir of King Henry I of England, was never drowned.
- GURPS Autoduel (second edition)
- GURPS Black Ops, describing a setting that Earth under threat from various alien, supernatural, and other monstrous powers, while the player characters are super-skilled agents of the clandestine agency "the Company", known as "Black Operatives" or "Black Ops"; the setting relies heavily on use of various known or less known urban legends and conspiracy theories.
- GURPS Cyberworld
- GURPS Goblins, describing an original fantasy setting in a society of goblins in London in the 1830s.
- GURPS Illuminati University, detailing a fictional college where absurdity and awful puns are the order of the day; its students range from witches and werewolves to secret agents and space aliens.
- GURPS Ogre, a roleplaying version of the post-apocalyptic Ogre wargame
- GURPS Reign of Steel, describing a future world conquered by a conspiracy of artificial intelligences, after a robot revolt has concluded with the machines' victory.
- David Pulver (1998). GURPS Technomancer. ISBN 1-55634-359-0., describing a setting and new rules in an alternative modern Earth where magic co-exists with technology. It was based on the premise that the Trinity atomic test ripped a hole in the fabric of space-time, triggering a tornado of magical energy.
- GURPS Y2K, detailing some possible scenarios involving the year 2000 problem and other world-changing events.

=== Licensed fictional settings ===
==== Television adaptations ====
- GURPS Prime Directive (see above)
- GURPS Prime Directive: Klingons
- GURPS Prime Directive: Klingon Gunboat Deckplans
- GURPS Prime Directive: Module Prime Alpha
- GURPS The Prisoner, detailing the setting of the UK television series The Prisoner.
- GURPS Fourth Edition Romulans. Starfleet Battles. Complete Imperial Data File. UPC 6 78554 08404 5. ISBN 1-58564-049-2. Stock 8404. 146 pages. May 2005.

==== Book adaptations ====
These adaptations originate in novels, and graphic novels:

- GURPS Callahan's Crosstime Saloon (1992), based on Callahan's Crosstime Saloon by Spider Robinson.
- GURPS Conan (1991), based on Conan the Barbarian by Robert E. Howard.
- GURPS Discworld (1998), based on Discworld by Terry Pratchett, using GURPS Lite.
- GURPS Discworld Also (2001), sequel to GURPS Discworld.
- Discworld Roleplaying Game (2002, 2016), based on Discworld by Terry Pratchett, and Powered by GURPS.
- Hellboy Sourcebook and Roleplaying Game (2002), detailing the world in which the adventures of Hellboy are set.Phil Masters, Jonathan Woodward (2002). Hellboy Sourcebook and Roleplaying Game. ISBN 978-1-55634-654-5.
- GURPS Lensman, detailing the setting of the Lensman series, a series of science fiction novels by E. E. Smith.
- GURPS New Sun, detailing the setting of The Book of the New Sun, a science fiction novel by Gene Wolfe.
- GURPS Planet Krishna, detailing the setting of The Queen of Zamba, a science fiction novel by L. Sprague de Camp.
- GURPS Planet of Adventure, describing a distant world populated by many varied alien and half-alien races, set in the world of the Planet of Adventure series of novels by Jack Vance.
- GURPS Riverworld, a setting in the fictional world described in the novels of the Riverworld series by Philip José Farmer. This setting is an artificial planet where everyone who lived before a set date in history seems to have been resurrected.
- GURPS Uplift, based on the fictional universe envisioned by David Brin in his Uplift Universe series, where biological uplift of animals has become common.
- GURPS War Against the Chtorr, describing additional rules and a game setting based on the War Against the Chtorr science fiction novel series by David Gerrold, which depicts an Earth invaded by an alien ecology.
- GURPS Wild Cards, detailing the setting of the science fiction/superhero shared universe Wild Cards
- Sasha Miller and Ben W. Miller (1989). GURPS Witch World. ISBN 1-55634-143-1.—a setting based on the series of Witch World novels by Andre Norton. Included are a bestiary of Witch World creatures, details on the non-human races, a history and geography of the planet, and a color-based system of magic.

==== Video game adaptations ====
- GURPS Alpha Centauri, detailing the setting of the Sid Meier's Alpha Centauri computer game.
- GURPS Myth, detailing the setting of the Myth computer game.

==== Traveller ====
SGG published a set of books designed to allow game play in an alternate timeline of Traveller's Third Imperium science-fiction setting using the GURPS rule system.

- GURPS Traveller: Science Fiction Adventure in the Far Future
- GURPS Traveller: Alien Races 1
- GURPS Traveller: Alien Races 2
- GURPS Traveller: Alien Races 3
- GURPS Traveller: Alien Races 4
- GURPS Traveller: Behind the Claw
- GURPS Traveller: Deck Plan 1 Beowulf-Class Free Trader
- GURPS Traveller: Deck Plan 2 Modular Cutter
- GURPS Traveller: Deck Plan 3 Empress Marava-Class Far Trader
- GURPS Traveller: Deck Plan 4 Assault Cutter
- GURPS Traveller: Deck Plan 5 Sulieman-Class Scout/Courier
- GURPS Traveller: Deck Plan 6 Dragon-Class System Defense Boat
- GURPS Traveller: Droyne Coyn Set
- GURPS Traveller: Far Trader
- GURPS Traveller: First In
- GURPS Traveller: Flare Star PDF
- GURPS Traveller: GM's Screen
- GURPS Traveller: Ground Forces
- GURPS Traveller: Heroes 1 - Bounty Hunters
- GURPS Traveller: Humaniti
- GURPS Traveller: Interstellar Wars (4e; see above)
- GURPS Traveller: Modular Cutter
- GURPS Traveller: Nobles
- GURPS Traveller: Planetary Survey 1 - Kamsii
- GURPS Traveller: Planetary Survey 2 - Denuli
- GURPS Traveller: Planetary Survey 3 - Granicus
- GURPS Traveller: Planetary Survey 4 - Glisten
- GURPS Traveller: Planetary Survey 5 - Tobibak
- GURPS Traveller: Planetary Survey 6 - Darkmoon
- GURPS Traveller: Psionics Institutes PDF
- GURPS Traveller: Rim of Fire
- GURPS Traveller: Star Mercs
- GURPS Traveller: Starports
- GURPS Traveller: Starships
- GURPS Traveller: Sword Worlds

Steve Jackson Games also published the Journal of the Travellers' Aid Society, the official magazine of Traveller.

==== Other RPG system conversions ====
- GURPS Blue Planet
- Steffan O'Sullivan (1992). GURPS Bunnies & Burrows. ISBN 1-55634-237-3.
- GURPS Castle Falkenstein
  - GURPS Castle Falkenstein: The Ottoman Empire
- GURPS Conspiracy X
- GURPS Deadlands
  - GURPS Deadlands: Hexes
  - GURPS Deadlands: Varmints
- GURPS In Nomine, the GURPS conversion of the In Nomine roleplaying game
- GURPS Mage: The Ascension, the GURPS conversion of the Mage: The Ascension roleplaying game
- GURPS Prime Directive
- GURPS Vampire: The Masquerade, the GURPS conversion of the Vampire: The Masquerade roleplaying game. Winner of the 1993 Origins Award for Best Roleplaying Supplement.
  - GURPS Vampire Companion
- GURPS Werewolf: The Apocalypse, the GURPS conversion of the Werewolf: The Apocalypse roleplaying game

=== Adventures ===
- GURPS Chaos in Kansas
- GURPS Conan and the Queen of the Black Coast
- GURPS Conan: Beyond Thunder River
- GURPS Conan: Moon of Blood
- GURPS Conan: The Wyrmslayer
- GURPS Cyberpunk Adventures, winner of the 1992 Origins Award for Best Roleplaying Adventure.
- GURPS Deadlands Dime Novel 1: Aces and Eights
- GURPS Deadlands Dime Novel 2: Wanted: Undead or Alive
- GURPS Deathwish
- GURPS Fantasy Adventures
- GURPS Flight 13
- GURPS For Love of Mother-Not
- GURPS Martial Arts Adventures′
- GURPS Operation Endgame
- GURPS School of Hard Knocks (1989), originally written with support for the Champions 4th edition rules, but these rules were removed from the final printing. They were later published online.
- GURPS Space Adventures
- GURPS Space: Stardemon
- GURPS Supers Adventures
- GURPS Time Travel Adventures

== First and second editions ==
=== Core books ===
- GURPS Basic Set, First Edition: Characters
- GURPS Basic Set, First Edition: Campaigns
- GURPS Basic Set, Second Edition: Characters
- GURPS Basic Set, Second Edition: Campaigns
- Man to Man: Fantasy Combat from GURPS, a boardgame of melee combat, using the combat rules from GURPS. Published in 1985, before GURPS.

=== Rules supplements ===
- GURPS Fantasy (first edition) introduced the magic system that would be included in the Third Edition Basic Set and expanded in GURPS Magic.

=== Creatures ===
- O'Sullivan, Steffan (1988). GURPS Bestiary. ISBN 1-55634-087-7. containing information and statistics for animals, including information to play animals as player character.

=== Technology and equipment ===
- GURPS High-Tech (first edition)

=== Genre toolkits ===
- GURPS Horror (first edition)
- GURPS Space (first edition)

=== History and culture ===
- GURPS Japan (first edition).

=== Original settings ===
- Autoduel (first edition), based on SJG's Car Wars game. Supplements included The AADA Road Atlas and Survival Guides:
  - AADA Road Atlas Volume 1: The East Coast
  - AADA Road Atlas Volume 2: The West Coast
  - AADA Road Atlas Volume 3: The South
  - AADA Road Atlas Volume 4: Australia
  - AADA Road Atlas Volume 5: The Midwest
  - AADA Road Atlas Volume 6: The Free Oil States
  - AADA Road Atlas Volume 7: The Mountain West
- GURPS Fantasy (first edition) introduces the Yrth setting, which would be the basis for subsequent editions of GURPS Fantasy and later GURPS Banestorm.

=== Licensed settings ===
- GURPS Horseclans, detailing the post-apocalyptic future described in the "Horseclans" science fiction series by Robert Adams.
- GURPS Humanx, detailing the Humanx Commonwealth, the setting of a series of science fiction novels by Alan Dean Foster.

=== Adventures ===
- GURPS Bili the Axe - Up Harzburk!, a campaign of solo adventures set in Robert Adams's "Horseclans" universe. The book was printed with a serious error making it virtually impossible to play, and so it was recalled.
- GURPS Fantasy Harkwood
- GURPS The Old Stone Fort
- GURPS Orcslayer
- GURPS Space: Unnight
- GURPS Zombietown U.S.A.

== Japanese products ==
Several books were produced in Japanese, mostly by the Japanese company Group SNE, and published by various publishers.

- Translations of GURPS, 3rd (published by Kadokawa Shoten(Kadokawa Sneaker Bunko (角川スニーカー文庫) or Kadokawa Sneaker G Bunko (角川スニーカー・G文庫))
  - GURPS Basic (『ガープス・ベーシック』) - Translation of GURPS Basic Set 3rd edition.
  - GURPS Magic (『ガープス・マジック』) - Translation of GURPS Magic for 3rd edition.
  - GURPS Martial Arts (『ガープス・マーシャルアーツ』) - Translation of GURPS Martial Arts for 3rd edition.
  - GURPS Psionics (『ガープス・サイオニクス』) - Translation of GURPS Psionics.
  - GURPS Cyberpunk (『ガープス・サイバーパンク』) - Translation of GURPS Cyberpunk.
- Translations of GURPS, 3rd (published by Fujimi Shobo)
  - GURPS Basic kanyaku-ban (『ガープス・ベーシック完訳版』) - The complete translated version of GURPS Basic (『ガープス・ベーシック』) and the translation of GURPS Basic Set Third Edition, Revised
  - GURPS Magic kanyaku-ban (『ガープス・マジック完訳版』) - The complete translated version of GURPS Magic (『ガープス・マジック』) and the translation of GURPS Magic Second Edition for 3rd edition.
    - GURPS Grimoire kanyaku-ban (『ガープス・グリモア完訳版』) - The translation of GURPS Grimoire.
  - GURPS Martial Arts kanyaku-ban (『ガープス・マーシャルアーツ完訳版』) - The complete translated version of GURPS Martial Arts (『ガープス・マーシャルアーツ』) and the translation of GURPS Martial Arts Second Edition for 3rd edition.
- GURPS Master Screen (『ガープス・マスタースクリーン』) - The master screen (マスタースクリーン) for GURPS 3rd edition(published by Kadokawa Shoten).
- Translations of GURPS, 4th (published by Fujimi Shobo)
  - GURPS Basic Dai-yon-han Character (『ガープス・ベーシック【第4版】キャラクター』) - The translation of GURPS Basic Set: Characters for Fourth Edition.
  - GURPS Basic Dai-yon-han Campaign (『ガープス・ベーシック【第4版】キャンペーン』) - The translation of GURPS Basic Set: Campaigns for Fourth Edition.
  - GURPS Mahou-taizen (『ガープス・魔法大全』) - The translation of GURPS Magic for Fourth Edition.
- GURPS Bushin kourin (『ガープス・マーシャルアーツ・アドベンチャー 武神降臨』) - Martial arts. The Supplement of GURPS Martial Arts.
- GURPS Cocoon (『ガープス・コクーン』) - Comical fantasy and the parody of Sword World RPG.
- GURPS Damned Stalkers (『ガープス・妖魔夜行』, Gurps Youma Yakou) - Modern horror. This supplement refers to GURPS Supers for Third Edition.
- GURPS The Damned Stalkers 2nd stage (『ガープス・百鬼夜翔, Gurps Hyakki Yasyou) - The sequel to GURPS Youma Yakou. This supplement refers to GURPS Supers for Third Edition, GURPS Compendium I and GURPS Compendium II.
- GURPS Dragon Merc (『ガープス・ドラゴンマーク』) - Crossover of multi-planes
- GURPS Power up (『ガープス・パワーアップ』) - Four original world settings
- GURPS Ring Dream (『ガープス・リング★ドリーム』) - Modern female wrestling
- GURPS RebornRebirth (『ガープス・リボーンリバース』) - Written by Shou Tomono(友野詳), Tadaaki Kawahito(川人忠明) and Group SNE; published by Hobby Base (ホビーベース) in 2006: each player character possesses his own Yuurei (guardian spirit) and fights against bad Yuureis.
- GURPS Runal/Yuel (『ガープス・ルナル』『ガープス・ユエル』) - Written by Shou Tomono and Group SNE; published by Kadokawa Shoten in 1992; "complete version" and GURPS Yuel published by Fujimi Shobo in 1994. Several novels have been published based upon GURPS Runal, set in a fantasy world strongly influenced from RuneQuest: seven mysterious Moons grant magic power to their worshipers.

== Korean products ==
The Korean publisher Dayspring Games (Korean: 도서출판 초여명) published the Korean translation of GURPS and at least an original supplement, GURPS Sylfiena, a fantasy setting.

- Translations of GURPS, 3rd edition
  - GURPS Gibon Set Gukmunpan (Korean: GURPS 기본세트 국문판): Translation of GURPS Basic Set, 3rd edition.
  - GURPS Mabeop (Korean: GURPS 마법): Translation of GURPS Magic for 3rd edition.
  - GURPS Muye (Korean: GURPS 무예): Translation of GURPS Martial Arts for 3rd edition.
  - GURPS Fantasy (Korean: GURPS 환타지): Translation of GURPS Fantasy for 3rd edition.
  - GURPS Fantasy Jongjok (Korean: GURPS 환타지 종족): Translation of GURPS Fantasy Folk for 3rd edition.
  - GURPS Cyberpunk (Korean: GURPS 사이버펑크): Translation of GURPS Cyberpunk for 3rd edition.
- Translations of GURPS, 4th edition
  - GURPS Gukmun 2-pan Gibon Set: Character Book (Korean: GURPS 국문2판 기본세트: 캐릭터북): Translation of GURPS Basic Set: Characters, 4th edition.
  - GURPS Gukmun 2-pan Gibon Set: Campaign Book (Korean: GURPS 국문2판 기본세트: 캠페인북): Translation of GURPS Basic Set: Campaigns, 4th edition.
  - GURPS Gukmun 2-pan Muhansegye (Korean: GURPS 국문2판 무한세계): Translation of GURPS Infinite Worlds.
  - GURPS Gukmun 2-pan Chosangneungryeok (Korean: GURPS 국문2판 초상능력): Translation of GURPS Powers.
  - GURPS Gukmun 2-pan Mabeop (Korean: GURPS 국문2판 마법): Translation of GURPS Magic for 4th edition.
  - GURPS Gukmun 2-pan Dungeon Fantasy (Korean: GURPS 국문2판 던전판타지): Translation and compilation from GURPS Dungeon Fantasy 1 to GURPS Dungeon Fantasy 4.
  - GURPS Gukmun 2-pan Muye (Korean: GURPS 국문 2판 무예): Translation of GURPS Martial Arts for 4th edition.
  - GURPS Gukmun 2-pan Hunterdeului Bam (Korean: GURPS 국문 2판 헌터들의 밤): Translation and compilation from GURPS Monster Hunters 1 to GURPS Monster Hunters 4.
  - GURPS Gukmun 2-pan Churiwa Susa (Korean: GURPS 국문 2판 추리와 수사): Translation of GURPS Mysteries.
- GURPS Gukmun 2-pan Sylfiena (Korean: GURPS 국문2판 실피에나): The first original GURPS book in Korea. A low-mana fantasy campaign setting on the Earldom of Sylfiena for GURPS, 4th edition.

== Brazilian Portuguese products ==
One of the first translations of GURPS was published in 1991 by the Brazilian publisher Devir Livraria. The company produced four editions of GURPS, keeping pace with revisions of the U.S. editions, but errors in the revised fourth edition released in 2015 led to the book being pulled from shelves. In 2017, Devir confirmed it would no longer publish GURPS products in Portuguese.

Beyond the core game, Devir published translations of a number of GURPS sourcebooks and adventures:

- GURPS Artes Marciais Translation of GURPS Martial Arts
- GURPS Conan
- GURPS Cyberpunk
- GURPS Escola de Super-heróis. Translation of GURPS School of Hard Knocks
- GURPS Fantasy
- GURPS Fantasy Tredroy
- GURPS Grimório. Translation of GURPS Grimoire
- GURPS Horror
- GURPS Illuminati
- GURPS Império Romano. Translation of GURPS Imperial Rome
- GURPS Magia. Translation of GURPS Magic
- GURPS Psiquismo. Translation of GURPS Psionics
- GURPS Supers
- GURPS Ultra-Tech
- GURPS Viagem Espacial. Translation of GURPS Space
- GURPS Viagem no Tempo. Translation of GURPS Time Travel.

Devir also produced a series of original adventures and sourcebooks branded as "Mini GURPS".

- Mini GURPS As Cruzadas. A Crusades sourcebook
- Mini GURPS Entradas e Bandeirantes. Entries and Flags, an adventure focused on exploring and conquering Brazil.
- Mini GURPS No coração dos deuses. In the Heart of the Gods, a solo adventure based on the movie No Coração dos Deuses
- Mini GURPS O descobrimento do Brasil. The Discovery of Brazil
- Mini GURPS O resgate de "Retirantes". The Rescue of "Retirantes", an adventure involving the painting Retirantes by Candido Portinari
- Mini GURPS Quilombo dos palmares. The Quilombo of Palmares, an adventure surrounding a 1600s maroon colony in Palmares, Brazil.

== German products ==
In Germany, Pegasus Spiele published a German-language translation of the GURPS core rules, along with translations of several sourcebooks and adventures.

- GURPS Conan
- GURPS Cyberpunk
- GURPS Horror
- GURPS Illuminati
- GURPS Magie. Translation of GURPS Magic
- GURPS Der Medusa-Virus. Translation of the GURPS Cyberpunk Adventures adventure "The Medusa Sanction"
- GURPS Meister der Sphären. Lord of the Spheres, an original multigenre adventure
- GURPS Scheibenwelt. Translation of GURPS Discworld
- GURPS Vampire: Die Maskerade. Translation of GURPS Vampire: The Masquerade
- GURPS Voodoo
- GURPS Wiedergeburt. Translation of the GURPS Space Adventures adventure "Rebirth"
- GURPS Zeitreise. Translation of GURPS Time Travel
