= GURPS Banestorm =

Tabletop role-playing game supplement for GURPS

- Fourth edition cover
- Designers: Phil Masters; Jonathan Woodward
- Publishers: Steve Jackson Games
- Publication: 2005; 21 years ago
- Genres: Fantasy
- Systems: GURPS

GURPS Banestorm, written by Phil Masters and Jonathan Woodward, is a setting sourcebook for the fourth edition of the GURPS Role-playing game released in October 2005. It details a fantasy setting called Yrth that has been updated from the older GURPS Fantasy source books, Orcslayer and the first edition of GURPS Magic. The standard fantasy elements such as wizards, orcs, elves, and dwarves are present, along with connections to GURPS Infinite Worlds. There are also some more unusual fantastic races like the reptile men, and several others which can be added in as desired by the game master.

== Setting ==
A basic premise of the setting is that magical banestorms pick up people and whole villages from other worlds (including Earth) and deposit them on Yrth. As a result, many of the societies and cultures are reminiscent of a Crusades-era Earth, albeit with magic. One significant difference this brings is that, unlike many fantasy settings, Yrth has many of the major Earth faiths as its core religions, including Christianity, Islam, Hinduism, Buddhism, Judaism, and others.

The setting's official timeline matches our own historical timeline, so that a campaign would be set in 2005 or 2006. The Banestorm started about 1,000 years ago when a group of dark elves completed a magical ritual designed to banish all Orcs from Yrth. The spell backfired horribly, and instead brought people from other worlds. Although the majority of Banestorm strikes occurred shortly after the initial backfire, giving the world its fantasy-medieval flavor, occasional flare-ups have occurred since then. For instance, in the 16th century, a number of humans were transported to Yrth from France, bringing with them dangerous knowledge of Protestantism, and gunpowder. The latter has since been suppressed due to concerns by the Empire of Megalos about too much technological progress.

== Plot ==
The setting allows for a different flavor of fantasy campaign depending on which region of Yrth is used. Araterre, for instance, is a seafaring nation inhabited by the descendants of those brought to Yrth from France in the 16th century. Light or no armor, swashbuckling, and courtly intrigue are the rule of the day. Sahud is the Asian mish-mash country, and would be suitable for a wuxia style game, or even something akin to Legend of the Five Rings. Some countries are almost entirely human-dominated, and others are mixed, while there are still some area completely under the control of Elves, Orcs, Dwarves, or Reptile Men.

== Third Edition ==
In third edition GURPS, the book GURPS Fantasy covered the Yrth setting rather than being a genre toolkit. It was among the inspiration sources for the Media Computing Group of the RWTH Aachen University for the development of the REXplorer mobile game. GURPS Fantasy: Tredroy and GURPS Fantasy: Harkwood provide additional setting information about Yrth.

== Publication history ==
GURPS Banestorm was published in 2005 for fourth edition, set in the world of Yrth.

== See also ==
- GURPS 4e Fantasy
- List of GURPS books
- List of campaign settings
