= GURPS Greece =

1995 supplement for the GURPS role-playing game

The age of gods and heroes
- Cover art by Jeff Koke
- Designers: Jon F. Zeigler
- Publishers: Steve Jackson Games
- Publication: December 1995; 31 years ago
- Genres: Historical fantasy, Ancient Greece
- Systems: GURPS third edition

GURPS Greece is a sourcebook for the GURPS (Generic Universal Role-Playing System), written by Jon Zeigler, and published by Steve Jackson Games in 1995. It details the history and myth of Ancient Greece.

== Description ==
GURPS Greece is a supplement that describes details of Ancient Greece, particularly the Heroic Age (1600–1150 BCE) and the Classical Age (800–323 BCE). Material covered includes equal parts historical background and mythologies, allowing the gamemaster to design a campaign based strictly on historical accuracy or on myth, or using a combination of both. Notable persons of the period are also detailed. The book includes some campaign outlines to get the gamemaster started, but does not include any full adventures.

== Publication history ==
In the 2014 book Designers & Dragons: The '80s, game historian Shannon Appelcline noted that Steve Jackson Games (SJG) decided in the early 1990s to stop publishing adventures, and as a result "SJG was now putting out standalone GURPS books rather than the more complex tiered book lines. This included more historical subgenre books. Some, such as GURPS Camelot (1991) and GURPS China (1991), were clearly sub-subgenres, while others like GURPS Old West (1991) and GURPS Middle Ages I (1992) covered genres notably missing before this point."

GURPS Greece is one of these standalone books, a 128-page softcover designed by Jon F. Zeigler, with interior art by Jean Martin and Shea Ryan, and cover art by Jeff Koke. It was published by SJG in 1995 for use with the third edition of GURPS.

== Reception ==
In the May 1996 edition of Dragon (Issue #229), Rick Swan liked the presentation of both historical and mythic information, giving the gamemaster more flexibility in designing a campaign, but did note that it would mean "more work for the referee." He found the content a bit dry, likening it to "notes for a term paper." He also noted that this wasn't the most creative content, commenting, "It's interesting, but hey, I know how to use an encyclopedia, too, and could probably have found most of this myself." He criticized the lack of any adventures, and noted "The skeletal campaign outlines aren't likely to inspire many memorable adventures." Swan concluded by giving the book an average rating of 4 out of 6, saying that it stood "as a solid [example] of history-based role-playing, [a must-have] for fans of GURPS."

== Reviews ==
- Casus Belli #93
- Australian Realms #27

== See also ==
- List of GURPS publications
