= GURPS Dinosaurs =

1996 Role-playing game supplement for GURPS

GURPS Cyberpunk Adventures
And other prehistoric creatures
- Cover art by Paul Koroshetz
- Designers: Stephen Dedman
- Publishers: Steve Jackson Games
- Publication: 1996; 30 years ago
- Genres: Dinosaur
- Systems: GURPS

GURPS Dinosaurs is a dinosaur and other creatures sourcebook for the GURPS (Generic Universal Role-Playing System), written by Stephen Dedman, and published by Steve Jackson Games in 1996.

== Description ==
GURPS Dinosaurs describes dinosaurs and Earth through prehistoric geological ages. Chapters include descriptions of the climatic conditions and creatures of each geological age and including, an overview, Paleozoic, Triassic, Jurassic, Cretaceous the Tertiary era (from Paleocene to Miocene), Pliocene and Pleistocene, the First Humans, Ice Age characters and a Prehistoric Campaigns chapters.

== Publication history ==
GURPS Dinosaurs is a 128-page softcover book designed by Stephen Dedman, with additional material by Kirk Tate, interior art by Scott Cooper, Russel Hawley, and Pat Ortega, and cover art by Paul Koroshetz. It was published by Steve Jackson Games in 1996.

In the 2014 book Designers & Dragons: The '80s, game historian Shannon Appelcline noted that Steve Jackson Games decided in the early 1990s to stop publishing adventures, and as a result "SJG was now putting out standalone GURPS books rather than the more complex tiered book lines. This included more historical subgenre books. Some, such as GURPS Camelot (1991) and GURPS China (1991), were clearly sub-subgenres, while others like GURPS Old West (1991) and GURPS Middle Ages I (1992) covered genres notably missing before this point."

== Reception ==
Jim Swallow reviewed GURPS Dinosaurs for Arcane magazine, rating it a 6 out of 10 overall, and stated that "My only gripe is the lack of any comic books listed in the biography. Titles such as Age of Tyrants would be of great use to anyone after background ideas."

In the December 1997 edition of Dragon (Issue #242), Rick Swan was ambivalent about this book, noting "As a reality-based reference, GURPS Dinosaurs scores high, cataloging literally hundreds of prehistoric creatures in remarkable detail." But Swan didn't think the book went beyond basic descriptions, commenting, "when it comes to putting all this together in a campaign, GURPS Dinosaurs pretty much leaves you on your own. There's a ton of hard data, but not much about roleplaying; that is, we're told a lot about what dinosaurs look like, but darn little about how they behave." He also thought the included scenarios were "too skimpy", and the book lacked sufficient illustrations. Swan concluded by giving the book an average rating of 4 out of 6, saying, "GURPS Dinosaurs is good as far as it goes; it just doesn't go far enough."

== See also ==
- List of GURPS publications
