= GURPS Goblins =

1996 supplement for the GURPS role-playing game

- Designers: Malcolm Dale; Klaude Thomas
- Publishers: Steve Jackson Games
- Publication: 1996; 30 years ago
- Genres: Alternate history, fantasy Georgian England
- Systems: GURPS third edition

GURPS Goblins is an fantasy sourcebook for the GURPS (Generic Universal Role-Playing System), written by Malcolm Dale and Klaude Thomas, and published by Steve Jackson Games in 1996. It is set in an alternate goblin Georgian England.

== Contents ==
GURPS Goblins enables players to create and play goblin characters in an alternate world populated by goblins, set in Georgian England. The book is divided into nine chapters that cover all aspects of goblin society in 1830, from laws and punishments to diseases and medicines.

Four short scenarios are also included.

== Publication history ==
GURPS Goblins was published for the third edition of GURPS by Steve Jackson Games in 1996. The 144-page book was written by Malcolm Dale and Klaude Thomas, with illustrations by Guy Burwell, Michael Gussow, and Dan Smith.

== Reception ==
In the May 1996 edition of Arcane (Issue 6), Steve Faragher was impressed by the quality of writing in this book, commenting, "Goblins is not only well researched but also very well written. It's not often that a set of rules makes me laugh out loud, but Goblins did on several occasions. The sparkling prose really brings to life this vast comic soap opera of goblin London with its urchins, pickpockets, chimney sweeps and King." He did find some flaws in the character generation system, noting "I was disappointed with the mish-mash of random rolls on difficult-to-use tables that Goblins requires. Combine this with the clever but mathematically intimidating GURPS point system and you have a bit of a nightmare for players and referees alike." He also noted that this campaign would require a large amount of work from the gamemaster. Faragher concluded by giving the book an average rating of 7 out of 10, saying, "On the whole, Goblins has such a wealth of wonderful background material that it's worth getting for that alone, and indeed it would be awarded an Arcane 9/10 if it stopped there. Unfortunately, there are some elements of the rules mechanics that are much less convincing."

In the July 1996 edition of Casus Belli (Issue 96), Tristan L'homme noted that "You have to know a little bit of history to get everything out of this big supplement." But although he called it "well written, half-informative, half-humorous, with lots of silly gags," he wondered if players would respond, saying, "I cannot see who will be interested." He concluded by giving the book an average rating of 3 out of 5, saying, "A good guide to London in the 1830s? Certainly. A reference book on goblins? As well. But above all the first attempt to publish a satirical role-playing game, in the noblest sense of the term. It is not certain that the medium lends itself to this task... or that the public will follow."

In the December 1996 edition of Dragon (Issue 236), Rick Swan called this book "off-the-wall, [one] of the best [game supplements] in many a moon." He gave two reasons for its success: "The material translates to other game systems with a minimum of tweaking. Second, [it's] funny."

== Other reviews ==
- Pyramid May 1996 (Issue 2, p. 4)
- Valkyrie #13 (1997)
- Australian Realms #30
- Dragão Brasil #19

== See also ==
- List of GURPS publications
