= GURPS Horror Space Flight 13 =

1994 supplement for the GURPS role-playing game

Adventure is a world gone mad
- Cover art by Guy Burchak
- Designers: W.G. Armintrout
- Publishers: Steve Jackson Games
- Publication: 1994
- Genres: science fiction horror
- Systems: GURPS third edition

GURPS Horror Space Flight 13 is a science fiction adventure for the GURPS (Generic Universal Role-Playing System), written by W.G. Armintrout, and published by Steve Jackson Games in 1989. It is designed to be used with either GURPS Horror or GURPS Space.

== Plot summary ==
GURPS Horror Space Flight 13 has a Fifties-style B movie setting where alien mad scientists kidnap a group of humans and subject them to a series of scientific tests in an amusement park arcade. It can be played using the rules for either GURPS Horror or GURPS Space.

== Publication history ==
GURPS Horror Space Flight 13 was written by W.G. Armintrout, with a cover by Guy Burchak, and illustrations by Charlie Wiedman, and was published by Steve Jackson Games in 1989 as a 64-page softcover book.

== Reception ==
In the October 1989 edition of Dragon (Issue #150), Ken Rolston thought the adventure was hard to characterize, calling it "1950s Television/Movie Science-Fiction Action-Adventure [...] And freed of such fetters as realism and real-life logic, it looks like a lot of fun." He liked the well-organized material, commenting, "The presentation and adventure staging is sharp and appealing, going for depth of characterization and episode rather than epic scope." He also liked the unexpected plot twists, saying, "all the stuff that happens is tricky and unexpected." He did have some issues with the wacky tone, pointing out "The one problem I can see is fitting this into an ongoing campaign. The tone and texture of the setting are not likely to match a standard SF action-adventure campaign." But he concluded on a positive note: "Flight 13 is full of fun, is well-presented, and is an admirable model for introducing PCs to a scenario through role-playing and interaction with NPCs. It is strongly recommended, though it is a bit eccentric by contrast with other GURPS science-fiction supplements."

In the June 1989 edition of Games International (Issue #6), James Wallis was ambivalent about this adventure, saying, "While the concept is good and the adventure well constructed, the ending is disappointing for both player and referee."

== See also ==
- List of GURPS publications
