= GURPS Deathwish =

1989 supplement for the GURPS role-playing game

- Designers: Loyd Blankenship
- Publishers: Steve Jackson Games
- Publication: 1989; 37 years ago
- Genres: Superhero
- Systems: GURPS

GURPS Deathwish is a superhero adventure for the GURPS (Generic Universal Role-Playing System), written by Loyd Blankenship, and published by Steve Jackson Games in 1989.

== Contents ==
GURPS Deathwish is written by Loyd Blankenship with cover art by John Dismukes, and published by Steve Jackson Games in 1989. It is an adventure in which a nationwide mystery unfolds as chaotic Deathwish concerts collide with a meta‑villain crew pulling off high‑stakes museum heists.

== Reviews ==
- Abyss #45 (Spring, 1990)
- Games Review (Volume 2, Issue 3 - Dec 1989)

== See also ==
- List of GURPS publications
