= GURPS Ice Age =

1992 supplement for the GURPS role-playing game

Roleplaying in the Prehistoric World
- Cover art by Guy Burchak
- Designers: Kirk Wilson Tate
- Publishers: Steve Jackson Games
- Publication: 1992; 34 years ago
- Genres: Prehistoric fantasy
- Systems: GURPS

GURPS Ice Age is an prehistoric sourcebook for the GURPS (Generic Universal Role-Playing System), written by Kirk Wilson Tate, and published by Steve Jackson Games in 1991.

== Contents ==
GURPS Ice Age is a sourcebook of GURPS rules for adventure set in prehistoric times. Character rules for various hominid races include Homo habilis, Homo erectus, Neanderthal, and Cro-Magnon peoples. New skills are also described, and there is a section on shamanism and magic. The book provides campaign setting data and animal descriptions for Pleistocene Europe and Pliocene Africa, and as Lawrence Schick noted in his 1991 book Heroic Worlds, dinosaurs are "thrown in for those who don't care too much about scientific accuracy". The book also includes campaign suggestions and sample scenarios, including an introductory adventure, "Wolf Pack on Bear River".

== Publication history ==
GURPS Ice Age was written by Kirk Wilson Tate, with cover art by Guy Burchak and illustrations by Donna Barr, and was first published by Steve Jackson Games in 1989 as a 64-page book.

Most of the material was later slightly reworked and republished in GURPS Dinosaurs, excluding the interior art by comics artist Donna Barr and the introductory adventure.

== Reception ==
In issue #6 of Games International (June 1989), James Wallis was impressed by this book, commenting "Whether you're thinking of cavemen against dinosaurs, anthropological campaigns or moaning black monoliths, GURPS Ice Age lets you do it all." He concluded by giving the book an above-average rating of 4 out of 5, calling it, "well researched, well presented and makes fascinating reading, with a surprisingly large potential for adventuring."

In issue #148 of Dragon (August 1989), Jim Bambra, was impressed with this book, commenting, "A game centered around cavemen and woolly mammoths? The GURPS Ice Age game takes this unusual subject and does a first-class job of turning it into a credible and detailed setting, including lots of background information and a gaming environment that makes a distinct change from other settings." He noted that the included adventure "does an admirable job of capturing the flavor of life at that time. The GURPS Ice Age game is also a handy sourcebook for GMs running time travel or lost-worlds adventures."

== See also ==
- List of GURPS publications
