= GURPS Blood Types =

1995 supplement for the GURPS role-playing game

- Designers: Lane Grate
- Publishers: Steve Jackson Games
- Publication: 1995; 31 years ago
- Genres: Horror
- Systems: GURPS third edition
- ISBN: 1-55634-113-X

GURPS Blood Types is a vampire sourcebook for the third edition of GURPS (Generic Universal Role-Playing System), written by Lane Grate and published by Steve Jackson Games in 1995. It contains biographies and gaming statistics for 23 vampires, vampire-like beings, and guidelines on creating more for various campaign settings.

== Publication history ==
Blood Types is a GURPS game supplement, published as a 128-page softcover book by Steve Jackson Games and designed by Lane Grate. Editing was by Jeff Koke and Scott Haring, with illustrations by Dan Smith and a cover by Tim Bradstreet.

== Reception ==
Rick Swan reviewed GURPS Blood Types for Dragon magazine #227 (March 1996), and rated it a 5 out of 6. According to Swan, Blood Types "belongs on the shelf of every horror aficionado who's had his fill of recycled Bela Lugosis".

== Reviews ==
- Rollespilsmagasinet Fønix (Danish) (Issue 12 - Mar/Apr 1996)
- Australian Realms #28

== See also ==
- List of GURPS publications
