= GURPS Cyberpunk =

1990 supplement for the GURPS role-playing game

- Designers: Loyd Blankenship
- Publishers: Steve Jackson Games
- Publication: 1990; 36 years ago
- Genres: Cyberpunk
- Systems: GURPS third edition
- ISBN: 1-55634-168-7

GURPS Cyberpunk is a cyberpunk sourcebook for the GURPS (Generic Universal Role-Playing System), written by Loyd Blankenship, and published by Steve Jackson Games in 1990. The original draft was a primary piece of evidence in Steve Jackson Games, Inc. v. United States Secret Service. In 1993, GURPS Cyberpunk Adventures, a collection of three RPG scenarios in the GURPS Cyberpunk line, won the Origins Award for Best Roleplaying Adventure of 1992.

== Contents ==
Besides the main chapters detailed below, GURPS Cyberpunk contains a glossary of common cyberpunk terms, an index, and a bibliography of relevant media.

Characters : This chapter describes some of the most common character archetypes (netrunner, corp(orate), cop, celebrity, etc.) and their typical skills, advantages, and disadvantages. It also provides a guideline about how much money a given job might bring or cost. Cyberwear : Rules for and descriptions of bionic enhancements. Technology & Equipment : Lists many sorts of near-future gadgets. Netrunning : The longest in the book, it details rules for realistic computer networks as well as fantastic cyberspaces accessible only through a neural interface. It describes what types of system can be found in the Net and how the characters can act (and fight) there. World Design : Gives guidelines for designing your own cyberpunk world. Campaigning : Helps the Gamemaster in running a longer series of adventures.

== U.S. Secret Service seizure ==
Loyd Blankenship, who was hired by Steve Jackson Games (SJG) in 1989, was nearly finished with GURPS Cyberpunk later that year, which was intended both to introduce the company into the popular cyberpunk genre, and to help the company get over its financial difficulties.

GURPS Cyberpunk received notoriety when the Austin headquarters of SJG was raided by the United states secret service in 1990. The authorities seized the manuscript for the sourcebook, which was under development at the time, asserting that it was a "handbook for computer crime". The book was reconstructed and rewritten from older drafts when the manuscript was not returned. The seizure delayed publication for six weeks. This raid is often wrongly attributed to Operation Sundevil, a nationwide crackdown on illegal computer hacking activities that was occurring about this time.

GURPS Cyberpunk was finally published in 1990, joining the already-released cyberpunk role-playing games Cyberpunk 2013 (1988) from R. Talsorian, Cyberspace (1989) from ICE, and Shadowrun (1989) from FASA.

== Publication history ==
GURPS Cyberpunk (ISBN 1-55634-168-7) was written by Loyd Blankenship and published by Steve Jackson Games in 1990, as a part of third edition GURPS (Generic Universal Role-Playing System).

== Reception ==
The July 1990 edition of Games International (Issue 16) commented that "computers interfaced with humans and piles of personal morality make playing cyberpunk a challenge." The reviewer concluded, "Lovers of William Gibson's Neuromancer should start here."

Stephan Wieck reviewed GURPS Cyberpunk in White Wolf #23 (Oct./Nov. 1990), rating it a 2 out of 5 and stated that "I think GURPS Cyberpunk would have been an excellent game supplement if it had been 60 pages longer and filled with more material to help a gamemaster create his campaign world. As it is, it's a nice introduction to the genre of cyberpunk, but the sourcebook doesn't have enough information to support a game campaign."

== Awards ==
At the 1991 Origins Awards, GURPS Cyberpunk was a nominee for Best Roleplaying Supplement of 1990.

== Other reviews ==
- Dragão Brasil #3 (1994) (Portuguese)
- Casus Belli #58
- Casus Belli #80

== See also ==
- List of GURPS publications
