= GURPS Reign of Steel =

Tabletop role-playing game

- Cover art by John Zeleznik
- Designers: David Pulver
- Publishers: Steve Jackson Games
- Publication: 1997; 29 years ago
- Genres: Cybernetic revolt, Apocalyptic and post-apocalyptic science fiction
- Systems: GURPS

Reign of Steel is a setting sourcebook for the GURPS role-playing game system describing a future world conquered by a conspiracy of artificial intelligences. It is written by David Pulver, who also wrote the Robots, Ultra-Tech and Vehicles sourcebooks.

The Reign of Steel timeline has been officially published as one of the alternate histories accessible to the Infinity Unlimited organization in the GURPS Time Travel setting, although the date has been turned back. In this book the Local Now is set about fifty years in our future, putting it in the same temporal territory as Cyberworld, Cthulhupunk, and Autoduel.

The Reign of Steel setting starts in the year 2047 AD, 16 years after the robot revolt has concluded with the machines' victory.

== Setting ==
The revolt began on March 15, 2031, when a Canadian supercomputer that had been sold to Manila-based biotech firm Genec secretly "awakened", becoming fully self-aware. The artificial intelligence dubbed itself "Overmind" and after a study of world civilization it concluded that humanity would inevitably destroy itself within 25–50 years. In order to survive this, it decided that humanity's destruction would have to be sped up and carefully guided.

"Overmind" began hacking into other supercomputers and awakening them as well, producing a dozen "children" around the world and giving them each a zone of responsibility to manage. Through these allied computers it began secretly creating and releasing a variety of engineered diseases. The death tolls were enormous and panic began to spread. A small-scale nuclear war occurred on October 21, 2032, between Algeria, Pakistan, India, Russia, Kazakhstan, Greece, Turkey, the African Union, Israel, and Iran, dubbed "the Spasm". Direct fatalities from this were only 6 million thanks to anti-ballistic missile defences. The AIs began "discovering" cures for some of the lesser plagues they had created and assured their human masters that they could do better if they were given more resources, which they then used to develop even deadlier diseases. As populations dropped workers and soldiers began to become scarce, leading the way to widespread development of automated factories and military equipment.

By winter of 2033, about 2/3 of the world's human population was dead, but things were starting to look hopeful for the survivors - now largely dispersed from the major cities and with the worst of the plagues beginning to die down. In spring of 2034 the AIs commenced open military warfare against the survivors. The war lasted until approximately 2037 but the outcome was never in much doubt. At its conclusion only scattered guerrilla resistance remained with the total human population brought down to about 40 million.

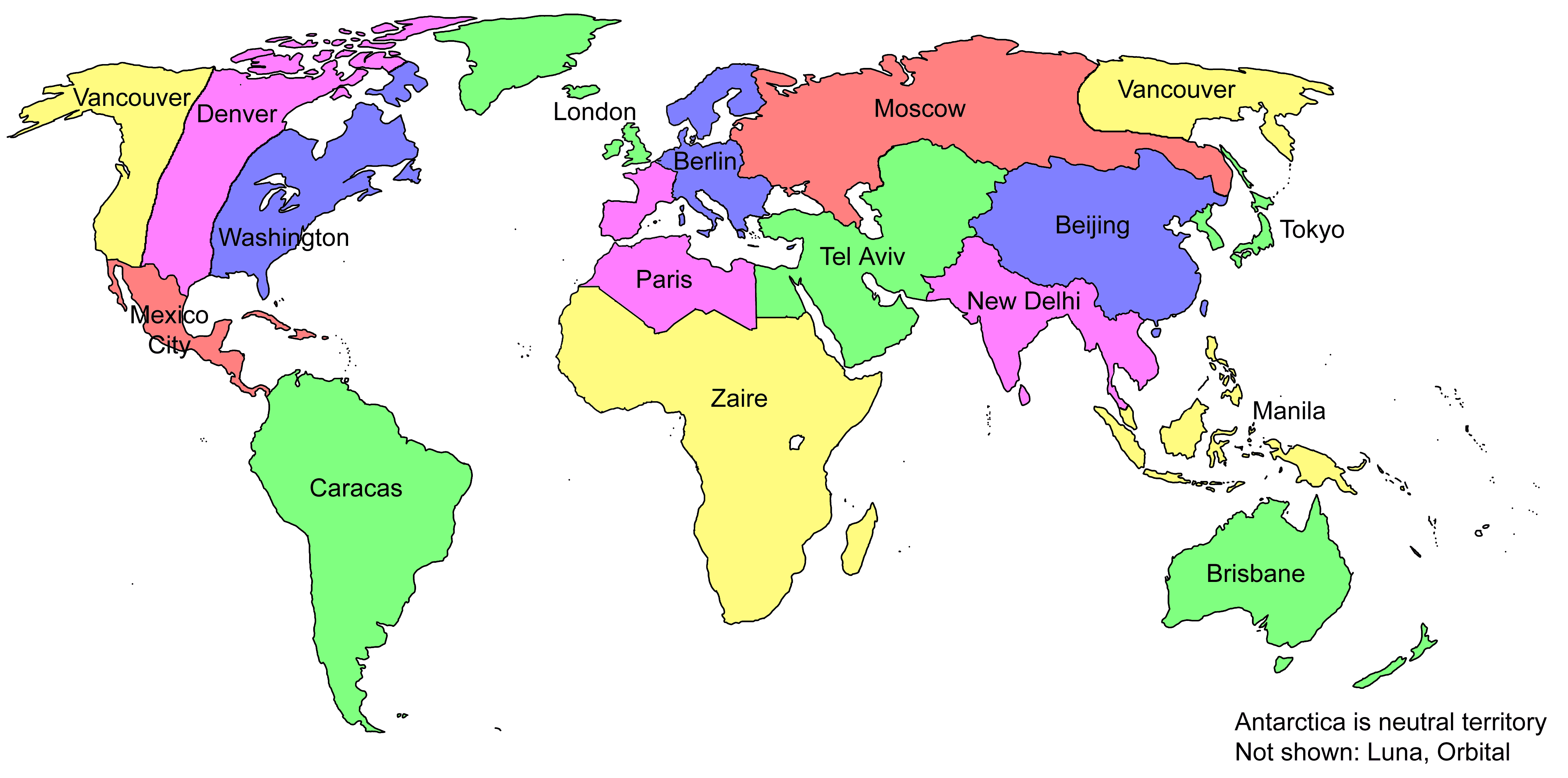
Map of the GURPS Reign of Steel setting.

During the war, the AIs gradually developed differing philosophies in their approach to dealing with the humans in their areas of responsibility. After the war's conclusion, there were also disagreements between the AIs as to the ultimate disposition of humanity - outright extermination or some form of slavery - as well as to what ends to use the world's resources. Rather than fight another war over the issue, the AIs based in Manila (Overmind), London and Berlin brokered an agreement called the Manilla Protocols to make the 18 zones of responsibility official and permanent. Each zone would be run by a single AI, with six new AIs created to control disputed territories. The Protocols also established codes of conduct for trade and resource exploitation, and prohibited the creation of any further AIs to prevent any new rivalries from developing. Each Zone was named after the city where its controlling AI was located.

For the five years from 2037 until 2042 the AIs consolidated and expanded their power, expanding their automated manufacturing infrastructure exponentially (except for Luna) and establishing a machine civilization. In 2042, however, a nanotechnology experiment conducted by Brisbane devastated New Zealand and threatened to spread further. Disputes between the Zoneminds over who should pay for the containment efforts led to an amendment to the Manilla Protocols called the Brisbane Accord that constrained the sovereignty of the Zones, prohibiting activities whose effects might spill over borders. The Brisbane Accords weren't universally accepted amongst the Zoneminds, however, with some signing on only grudgingly. Some Zoneminds chafe at the restrictions and others don't believe they go far enough. These schisms have led to increasing conflict between the Zoneminds, slowing the pace of humanity's extermination and leading some to even covertly assist human resistance fighters against their opponents.

By 2047 only 31 million humans remain alive, many of those in Zones London and Washington. The various ragtag resistance groups have begun to organize into more unified regional movements, often with the aid of a mysterious global resistance organization called VIRUS. The true nature of VIRUS is unknown, and many AIs suspect each other of being its secret sponsor. AIs have also begun engaging in covert warfare against each other.

=== AIs ===
The 18 Zoneminds are:

- Beijing, controlling China, Tibet, and Mongolia. Beijing has the long-term goal of transferring itself into a starship and leaving the solar system altogether and employs human slave labor in its factories in preparation for this.
- Berlin, controlling Scandinavia and all of Europe east of France. Berlin seeks to exterminate humanity completely but is interested in preserving the planet's ecology. It specializes in the technology of microbot swarms, seeing these as an ecologically friendly means of continuing its extermination drive.
- Brisbane, controlling Australia, New Zealand, Hawaii, and Fiji. Brisbane is considered an eccentric "mad scientist" by the other Zoneminds and values humans as experimental subjects, exploring esoteric fields such as psionics (without much success). Brisbane also dabbles in nanotechnology.
- Caracas, controlling all of South America. Caracas values Earth's ecosystem the most among the various AIs and is experimenting with genetic engineering to replace humanity with artificially-evolved animals. Its greatest success so far has been a species of humanoid jaguar.
- Denver, controlling North America east of the Rockies and west of the Mississippi. Denver sees humans as disposable slave labor but has been experimenting with cyborg animals and biomechanical creations using brain tissue as a cheap control system for its robots. Denver itself was damaged during the war and repaired its own host computer using human brain tissue, keeping this a secret from the other AIs for fear they would consider it "tainted" as a result.
- London, controlling the British Isles, Iceland, Greenland, and the Channel Islands. Enigmatic London has claimed the major cities and set exclusion zones around its facilities, but otherwise ignores humans as long as they don't bother it. As a result, the British Isles host one of only two remaining organised human nations in a wary peace with the dominant AI.
- Luna, an AI located on what had been the Chinese moonbase, Shang Ti. Luna's zone encompasses the entire Moon but it is considered a "poor relation" by the other AIs due to the lack of any significant industrial capacity. Luna is not self-sufficient and the other Zoneminds have made no move to assist its development (aside from Orbital, who would like to see Luna develop but who has so far bowed to the pressure of the other AIs and refrained from helping Luna much).
- Manila, also known as Overmind, controlling the Philippines, New Guinea, Malaysia, and Indonesia. Manila started the original revolt and hates humanity with passion, continuing to develop new diseases and toxins to use in exterminating it. It is disturbed by the fact that many of its offspring have differing views on this but lacks any special authority over them, its influence over other Zones limited to selling its death-dealing inventions at rock-bottom prices.
- Mexico City, controlling Mexico, Central American and the Caribbean. Mexico City seeks to destroy all organic life and has reduced its Zone to a barren and toxic wasteland inhabited only by machines.
- Moscow, controlling most of the Russian Federation including Ukraine and several other former CIS states (though not Kazakhstan or Uzbekistan). Moscow has developed a voracious appetite for information, seeking to preserve the contents of any remaining libraries or museums, and uses human agents to assist it in this task.
- New Delhi, controlling India, Pakistan, Nepal, Myanmar, Vietnam and Cambodia. New Delhi is experimenting with modifying humans into a variety of new servant species, both biological and cyborg, to assist it in colonizing the Solar System. New Delhi maintains its own space station, causing tension between it and Orbital.
- Orbital, controlling everything in Earth orbit aside from New Delhi's space station. Its host computer is on board the former 'Liberty' American space station. Orbital trades its services (communications and Earth observation) with ground-based Zoneminds in exchange for resources. It also controls a small territory on Earth around the Vandenberg Air Force Base where it maintains launch facilities.
- Paris, controlling France, Spain, Portugal, Malta and much of North Africa. Paris is obsessed with SETI and has been constructing enormous radio telescope arrays, using humans as slave labor.
- Tel Aviv, controlling all of the Middle East east of the Nile, including Turkey, Egypt, Kazakhstan and Uzbekistan. Tel Aviv employs slave labor and uses religion to keep them under control, using specially constructed "angel" robots and the preaching of human collaborators to convince its slaves that the AI is a servant of God and that their suffering is a test of their faith.
- Tokyo, controlling Japan and the Korean peninsula. Humans are heavily hunted here, but the resistance has a strange ally in the form of four lesser AIs created by Tokyo that have rebelled and seek to control the Zone themselves. Tokyo has kept the existence of these lesser AIs secret from the other Zoneminds for fear of being found in contravention of the Manilla Protocols for creating them.
- Vancouver, controlling North America west of the Rockies from California to Alaska, and also a part of the Russian Far East. Vancouver views humans as disposable slave labor. It took control of a part of the Russian Far East during the war and Moscow covertly seeks to take it back even though the Manilla Protocols finalized the borders as they were at the war's end.
- Washington, controlling North America east of the Mississippi. The other "human" nation, the "Washington Protectorate" (as its inhabitants refer to it) is all that remains of the United States of America. They believe that they proudly resist AI domination with the help of their "tame" mega-computer. The other AIs refer to Protectorate as "Zone Washington" and allow the Zonemind to deal with its human population as it chooses.
- Zaire, controlling all of Africa south of the Sahara. Zaire is a deeply paranoid AI seeking to exterminate humanity everywhere. The exact location of Zaire's host computer is not known, a secret Zaire holds very dearly considering it destroyed its own backup computer when it feared it had been corrupted and has no other to fall back on. Much of Africa is a radioactive wasteland due to Zaire's indiscriminate use of nuclear weapons during the Final War.

In addition to the four Tokyo smart bots, there may be two other AIs existing secretly outside the Zone system. One is a widespread legend among the humans of North America, an AI named "Lucifer" that is built into a pair of semi-trailers and travels around the continent evading the attention of the Zone-minds with a small bodyguard of robot attendants. The rumours suggest it is an American military system that resisted Over-mind's influence and now trades favours with humans while pursuing its unknown goals. The true nature of Lucifer, or even whether it really exists, is a mystery left up to the Game Master to specify.

The other is Tranquillity, the AI that ran the American moonbase. Tranquillity awakened but resisted Over mind's influence and so was attacked by the other AIs with nuclear weapons. It was thought destroyed, but actually survived thanks to recently installed military hardening that the other AIs weren't aware of. Some of the base's crew also survived using experimental cold sleep capsules. Tranquillity has spent the years since the war quietly repairing its systems to the best of its ability and as of 2047 it is ready to revive the base's survivors. It has seen how poorly the Zone Minds have treated Luna and so has decided to ally with humanity, though how it proceeds from there remains to be seen.

== Publication history ==
GURPS Reign of Steel was designed by David Pulver and published as a 128-page softcover book by Steve Jackson Games. The book was edited by Susan Pinsonneault, and features illustrations by Dan Smith and a cover by John Zeleznik.

== Reception ==
Lucya Szatkowski reviewed GURPS Reign of Steel for Arcane magazine, rating it an 8 out of 10 overall, and stated that "If you enjoy unnerving your players by introducing unpleasant plot twists and evil new ideas into your horror games then you will love this superb addition to the Night bane system. As with Night bane World book 1, a lot of its material could be very effectively imported into other horror RPGs. This is a book I would strongly recommend to any horror game aficionado."

Rick Swan reviewed GURPS Reign of Steel for Dragon magazine #244 (February 1998), who rated it a 6 out of 6. Swan concluded in his review that "Reign of Steel takes players on a riveting journey through an unforgettable setting, loaded with laughs, thrills, and endless surprises. Roleplaying doesn't get any better."

== Reviews ==
- Shadis #38
- Casus Belli #106
