= GURPS Werewolf: The Apocalypse =

Role-playing game supplement

Cover art by Dan Smith, 1993

GURPS Werewolf: The Apocalypse is a supplement published by Steve Jackson Games (SJG) in 1993 that translates the role-playing game Werewolf: The Apocalypse to the GURPS (Generic Univerdsal Role-Playing System) rules set.

== Contents ==
GURPS Werewolf: The Apocalypse is a supplement that converts the World of Darkness setting to GURPS rules. There are seven chapters:

1. Through a Glass Darkly: The World of Darkness, and an overview of lycanthropic society and its enemies.
2. Characters: How to generate a werewolf player character
3. Permutations: New GURPS rules specific to werewolves.
4. Breeds, Auspices and Tribes: The different groups that make up lycanthropic society.
5. Gifts and Rites: New special powers for werewolf characters.
6. Spirit and Being: A description of the Umbra, a plane that werewolves can visit to gain certain powers.
7. Bestiary: Mythical creatures, mostly from Umbra.
8. Conversions: How to convert werewolf characters from the original White Wolf RPG to GURPS.

== Publication history ==
White Wolf Publishing released the first of the original World of Darkness books in 1993. Two years later, White Wolf licensed Steve Jackson Games (SJG) to revise the World of Darkness books for SJG's GURPS rules system. The first book published by SJG was GURPS Vampire: The Masquerade, followed quickly by GURPS Werewolf: The Apocalypse, a 208-page softcover book designed by Robert M. Schroeck, with illustrations by Doug Shuler and Albert Stark, and cover at by Dan Smith.

In the 2014 book Designers & Dragons: The '80s, game historian Shannon Appelcline stated that "GURPS again proved itself 'universal' in the early '90s when SJG started adapting other game worlds to the system. GURPS Bunnies & Burrows (1992), based on an old FGU game, was the first. The GURPS versions of White Wolf's very popular World of Darkness games were a much bigger coup."

== Reviews ==
In the November 1994 edition of Dragon (Issue #211), Rick Swan thought that translating the Werewolf RPG to GURPS "cleans up the text, and puts it all together in a handsome package." He admired the "illuminating sidebars [that] clarify the mythos." As to which on he preferred, the original White Wolf system or the newer GURPS conversion, Swan was undecided, saying, "Whether you prefer the White Wolf or GURPS rules is largely a matter of style; White Wolf offers more flexibility, GURPS more precision. Schroeck’s economical writing, however, makes this book a better read, so I give the edge to GURPS."
