= GURPS Shapeshifters =

- Designers: Robert M. Schroeck
- Publishers: Steve Jackson Games
- Publication: 2003; 23 years ago
- Genres: Fantasy, horror, science fiction
- Systems: GURPS
- ISBN: 1-55634-452-X

GURPS Shapeshifters is a roleplaying game supplement written by Robert M. Schroeck, in 2003 and published by Steve Jackson Games for the GURPS role-playing game, third edition.

== Contents ==
GURPS Shapeshifters contains character creation rules, game environments and sample shifters for various campaign settings.

The first chapter studies the history and mythology of shapeshifters from four periods: the prehistoric, the classical, the medieval and the modern era. The chapter ends with a discussion of medical conditions that might be involved in "real" lycanthropy: dementia, rabies, porphyria and congenital generalized hypertrichosis.

The second chapter is concerned with game mechanics, and the third looks at campaigns. Included is a sample setting based on British India, where the natives have been granted the ability to turn into bipedal lions by their god so they can repel the invaders.

The fourth chapter is about species with the ability to take many forms. First are the Doppelgängers, who blend in with humans, sometimes to co-exist, sometimes to hunt. Next are the Enyyn, a kindly race of amorphous blobs who study ethics and philosophy. Third are the Hawkshaw Bioroids, a sub-species of humanity designed for infiltration and espionage. Lastly are the Metamorphic Invaders: intelligent, sociopathic aliens who devour their victims and steal their forms.

The fifth and final chapter concerns creatures who can only take a few forms, including werewolves, selkies and kitsune. Also included is a Jekyll-and-Hyde analogue and a full-scale robotic all-terrain vehicle that turns into an ordinary affectionate housecat.

== Publication history ==
GURPS Shapeshifters is a 128-page soft-bound book compiled by Robert M. Schroeck and published in 2003 by Steve Jackson Games.

== Reception ==
Backstab gave the supplement a 3 out of 5.

== See also ==
- List of GURPS books

== Sources ==
- Steve Jackson Games
- Amazon
