= GURPS High-Tech =

1988 supplement for the GURPS role-playing game

A sourcebook of weapons & equipment through the ages
- First edition cover
- Designers: Michael Hurst
- Publishers: Steve Jackson Games
- Publication: 1988 first edition; 2007 second edition
- Genres: Historical, modern, science fiction
- Systems: GURPS

GURPS High-Tech is a weapons and transportation sourcebook for the GURPS (Generic Universal Role-Playing System), written by Michael Hurst, and published by Steve Jackson Games in 1988.

== Contents ==
GURPS High-Tech is a GURPS supplement of rules for weapons and transportation, focusing on firearms and organized into seven technological levels, from the black-powder-musket era to a future of lasers and stun guns. It includes descriptions of standard weapons from all levels. It is a universal sourcebook for GURPS that is intended to be useable in many different settings.

The book is divided into three sections:

1. . Guns, Projectiles, and Explosives
2. . Details of the four "tech" levels covered by this book
3. . A list of individual weapons, costs and availability

== Publication history ==
GURPS High-Tech was written by Michael Hurst, with art by Guy Burchak, and was first published by Steve Jackson Games in 1988 as a 128-page book. A second edition was published in 2007 for GURPS fourth edition.

== Reception ==
In issue 4 (April 1989) of Games International, James Wallis questioned the blurb on the back cover of the book, which claimed this book was "A Sourcebook of Weapons & Equipment Through the Ages." Wallis agreed with the "weapons" part of the description, but found equipment "takes a back seat." He did find the book "well-presented and laid out, written in an interesting style which often takes joy in tongue-in-cheek examples of the rules which it explains." He concluded by giving the book an average score of 3.5 out of 5, saying, "It is not essential by any means, but is a nice items for the GURPS referee to own."

Reviews of GURPS High-Tech appeared in two issues of Dragon.

In issue 152 (December 1989), Jim Bambra thought that the book was "a valuable addition to the GURPS system, particularly to GMs running historical or time-travel campaigns. Using these rules, small-scale military actions can easily be staged and have the added bonus of being set in any gunpowder era—modern day, World War II, the American Civil War, the Napoleonic Wars, and the Thirty Years War being just some of the possibilities." Bambra concluded with a thumbs up, "Even you have no interest in the GURPS game system, GURPS High-Tech is still a very useful guide to weaponry and equipment."

In issue 192 (April 1993), Rick Swan described the book as "Packed with lucid descriptions, sharp illustrations, and fascinating trivia (early military engineers not only designed weapons, they also distilled brandy and taught chess), High Tech is a dazzler.

== See also ==
- List of GURPS publications
