= GURPS Lensman =

1993 supplement for the GURPS role-playing game

Starkly astounding space-opera adventure!
- Designers: Sean Barrett
- Publishers: Steve Jackson Games
- Publication: 1993; 33 years ago
- Genres: Science fiction
- Systems: GURPS

GURPS Lensman is a science fiction sourcebook for the GURPS (Generic Universal Role-Playing System), published by Steve Jackson Games in 1993. It details the setting of E. E. "Doc" Smith's Lensman novel series.

== Contents ==
GURPS Lensman is a supplement in which the world of the Lensman novel series is detailed.

== Reception ==
David L. Pulver reviewed GURPS Lensman in White Wolf #48 (Oct., 1994), rating it a 3.5 out of 5 and stated that "Despite its minor flaws, this book is faithful to the novels and is fun to read. It contains just about everything you'll need to run a Lensman game. The new equipment, spacecraft and aliens make this a worthwhile purchase even for a GURPS Space campaign."

== Reviews ==
- Papyrus (Issue 13 - Holiday 1993)

== See also ==
- List of GURPS publications
