= GURPS Terradyne =

Role-playing game supplement

- Cover art by Alan Gutierrez
- Designers: Russell Brown; Mark Waltz
- Publishers: Steve Jackson Games
- Publication: 1991; 35 years ago
- Genres: Hard Science Fiction
- Systems: GURPS

GURPS Terradyne is a worldbook for GURPS, written by Russell Brown and Mark Waltz, and published in 1991 by Steve Jackson Games. It is a future history suitable for a Hard Science Fiction campaign, in the style of stories by Robert A. Heinlein, Lester del Rey and Ben Bova or the manga/anime Planetes.

== Contents ==
Technology has moved man out into space but not yet out of the Solar System. Mars is being terraformed but is not yet fully habitable. Terradyne, a space-based corporate state, dominates but does not have exclusive control of space-based industries.

== Publication history ==
GURPS Terradyne was designed by Russell Brown and Mark Waltz, and edited by Creede Lambard, and published by Steve Jackson Games as a 128-page softcover book. Illustrations are by Ruth Thompson, Michael Barrett, Angela Bostick, Steve Crompton, C. Bradford Gorby, Denis Loubet, Rick Lowry, Michael Surbrook, and John Waltrip, with a cover by Alan Gutierrez.

It was superseded by the Transhuman Space series which covers the same niche. Some material on Mars was incorporated into Transhuman Space: In The Well.

== Reception ==
Rick Swan reviewed GURPS Terradyne for Dragon magazine #190 (February 1993). In his evaluation, Swan comments: "By emphasizing technology over space opera, Terradyne's sober tone compares favorably to GDW's MegaTraveller game and other hard science-fiction RPGs. Though the dystopian outlook may strike some as overly familiar - how many times have we been warned about grasping corporations? - the thoughtful presentation results in a compelling study of greed gone amuck. And it's user-friendly to boot; except for a few pages devoted to character design, there aren't many new rules to navigate."

== See also ==
- List of GURPS publications
