= GURPS Cyberpunk Adventures =

1992 Role-playing game supplement for GURPS

Dark scenarios for roleplaying on the edge
- Designers: Loyd Blankenship; Tim Keating; Jak Koke; David L. Pulver
- Publishers: Steve Jackson Games
- Publication: 1992; 34 years ago
- Genres: Cyberpunk
- Systems: GURPS third edition

GURPS Cyberpunk Adventures is a trio of cyberpunk adventures for the third edition of GURPS (Generic Universal Role-Playing System), written by Loyd Blankenship, Tim Keating, Jak Koke, and David L. Pulver, and published by Steve Jackson Games in 1992.

== Contents ==
This book contains three role-playing adventures using the third edition GURPS rules. All three adventures evoke the cyberpunk genre:

- "The Medusa Sanction": The characters are hired to recover a package, and soon find themselves involved in industrial espionage and biological warfare.
- "Jericho Blackout": Acting as mercenaries, the characters confront a gang of cybernetic street gangs in Montana.
- "Jigsaw Incomplete": The characters must deal with reality-altering technology that is not working in the way it was intended.

== Publication history ==
GURPS Cyberpunk Adventures is a 128-page softcover book written by Loyd Blankenship, Tim Keating, Jak Koke, and David L. Pulver, with artwork by Carl Anderson, Michael Barrett, Guy Burchack, Dan Carroll, C. Bradford Gorby, Rick Harris, Darrell Midgette, Paul Mounts, Rob Prior, Dan Smith, Jeffrey K. Starling, Ruth Thompson, and Gary Washington. It was published by Steve Jackson Games in 1992.

== Reception ==
In the December 1993 edition of Dragon (Issue #200), Rick Swan called the book "three solidly plotted scenarios drenched in high-tech grunge." While Swan thought that "All three boast smart premises and breakneck pacing", he criticized the authors for too many instances of deus ex machina, saying, "the designers struggle with methods for feeding information to the PCs, relying on such hokey devices as a fortuitous computer printout (some 700 words long) and a tape-recorded confession." He also was not impressed with the artwork, commenting that "The pedestrian illustrations and dull maps pale before those of, say, FASA's Shadowrun game supplements." Swan concluded with a swipe at the book's Origin Award, saying, "One of 1992's best? No question. The best? Nahh..."

== Awards ==
At the 1993 Origins Awards, GURPS Cyberpunk Adventures won Best Roleplaying Adventure of 1992.

== Other reviews ==
- The Scroll #10 (Sept 1992, "Creative Justive - Game Reviews"
- The Last Province #2 (Dec 1992, "Pandora's Box")

== See also ==
- List of GURPS publications
