= GURPS Aztecs =

1993 supplement for the GURPS role-playing game

- Publishers: Steve Jackson Games
- Publication: 1993; 33 years ago
- Genres: Alternate histories
- Systems: GURPS

GURPS Aztecs is an Aztec sourcebook for the GURPS (Generic Universal Role-Playing System), published by Steve Jackson Games in 1993.

== Contents ==
GURPS Aztecs is a supplement in which the ancient Aztec culture is detailed.

== Reception ==
Shane Hensley reviewed GURPS Aztecs in White Wolf #39 (1994), rating it a 4 out of 5 and stated that "[The price] is a fair amount to pay for a 128-page book, but it's standard for such GURPS supplements. If it's any consolation, you get everything you need to play an Aztec campaign in one book."

== See also ==
- List of GURPS publications
