= GURPS Cliffhangers =

1989 sourcebook for the GURPS role-playing game

Cliffhangers
- Cover art by Miro Sinovcic
- Designers: Brian J. Underhill
- Illustrators: Miro Sinovcic; Butch Burcham
- Publishers: Steve Jackson Games
- Publication: 1989
- Genres: GURPS

GURPS Cliffhangers is a 1930s pulp-hero sourcebook for the GURPS (Generic Universal Role-Playing System), written by Brian J. Underhill, and published by Steve Jackson Games in 1989.

== Description ==
GURPS Cliffhangers is a GURPS campaign setting supplement describing how to run pulp-hero adventures set in the 1930s. After a short introduction, the book has six chapters:

1. "The Era": History and daily life in the 1930s.
2. "The Settings": The various regions of the world at the time, with an emphasis on ten nations and locations that could be fertile ground for an adventure. Each of these locations has scenario ideas.
3. The Hero: Character creation and equipment.
4. Gadgeteering: Rules on inventing new gadgets.
5. Adventure Design: Advice for creating scenarios that contain the adventurous spirit of pulp fiction.
6. The Cliffhangers Campaign: Thoughts about campaigns, and scenario ideas.

The book concludes with a sample adventure, "Black Diamond: Prologue", which begins at a technological exposition and ends abruptly, leaving the gamemaster to design more chapters of the adventure. The book also contains a bibliography and filmography of works of this genre.

== Publication history ==
Steve Jackson Games (SJG) published the Generic Universal Role-Playing System, GURPS in 1986, and followed this up with many genre sourcebooks to allow gamemasters to design adventures in almost any genre. One of these was GURPS Cliffhangers, and 96-page softcover book written by Brian J. Underhill, with cover art by Miro Sinovcic and interior illustrations by Butch Burcham.

== Reception ==
In Issue 11 of the British games magazine Games International, Paul Mason noted that the book's approach to adventure design was "that of a serial, where every episode ends on a cliffhanger. There are practical problems to taking this approach in a rolegame, but it shows willingness on the part of the author to find ways to capture the unique style of the genre." Mason concluded by giving this book a rating of 3 out of 5, saying, "Overall the artwork is weak, but the material is up to the usual GURPS standards. If I wanted to play a game set in this period, I'd be hard pressed to choose between this and Justice, Inc.."

In Issue 44 of Abyss (Winter 1989), David Nalle thought the background material was "solid, basic, and about what you would expect." Nalle also found the chapter on adventure design "pretty extensive, including an explanation of the importance of the rather difficult-to-play capture situation so essential to pulp fiction, and also an examination of the role of the deus ex machina as a plot device for the adventure." Nalle concluded, "This is a good, compact and pretty thorough presentation of the topic ... For the stuff you need to stimulate your imagination in order to run a campaign, it is tops."

== Other reviews and commentary ==
- Alarums & Excursions #322.

== See also ==
- List of GURPS publications
