= GURPS Atomic Horror =

1993 supplement for the GURPS role-playing game

- Designers: Paul Elliott; Chris McCubbin
- Publishers: Steve Jackson Games
- Publication: 1993; 33 years ago
- Genres: B-movie science fiction and horror
- Systems: GURPS third edition

GURPS Atomic Horror is a B-movie science fiction and horror movie inspired sourcebook for the GURPS (Generic Universal Role-Playing System), written by Paul Elliott and Chris McCubbin, and published by Steve Jackson Games in 1993.

== Contents ==
According to reviewer Shane Hensley, "Atomic Horror is a sourcebook about the B-grade movies primarily made in the 50s." The module details five alien races in the mold of the science fiction movies of the period: the Arendians, "energy fog" creatures who possess human host bodies; the human-seeming Loi, who may in fact be the ancestors of the human race; the brain-eating Metarans; the genetically engineered Alphans; and the far-future Vortuns, who inhabit the year 6000 and draw people forward in time (they are responsible for the Bermuda Triangle) to have their disembodied brains implanted into healthy bodies untainted by the future wars that nearly destroyed humanity.

== Publication history ==
The supplement was written by Paul Elliott and Chris McCubbin and published by Steve Jackson Games. It was first published in 1993 and subsequently revised.

== Reception ==
Shane Hensley reviewed GURPS Atomic Horror in a 1993 issue of White Wolf. He said that it was "a near perfect example of what a source book should be" and "a gaming classic", while recommending it for those interested in horror campaigns or humorous gaming. Overall he rated it a 4 out of a possible 5.

== Reviews ==
- Casus Belli #77

== See also ==
- List of GURPS publications
