= GURPS Space Stardemon =

1989 supplement for the GURPS role-playing game

Spacefarers unlock an ancient secret
- Cover art by Alan Gutierrez
- Designers: Greg Porter
- Publishers: Steve Jackson Games
- Publication: 1989; 37 years ago
- Genres: Science fiction
- Systems: GURPS

GURPS Space Stardemon is a science fiction sourcebook for the GURPS (Generic Universal Role-Playing System), written by Greg Porter, and published by Steve Jackson Games in 1989. It is designed to be used with GURPS Space.

== Plot summary ==
Stardemon is an adventure in which the player characters take part in an archeological expedition in the jungle of the planet Anson.

== Publication history ==
GURPS Space Stardemon was written by Greg Porter, and was published by Steve Jackson Games in 1989 as a 32-page book with cover art by Alan Gutierrez.

== Reception ==
In Issue six of the British games magazine Games International, Paul Mason stated that "While it's not the kind of thing to buy for ideas, if trying to run a reasonably standard science fiction campaign, Stardemon provides a useful stop-gap scenario which could set up several recurring plot themes." Mason concluded by giving the adventure an average rating of 3 out of 5.

In Issue 69 of the French games magazine Casus Belli, Croc noted the lack of support and publicity given to this product, wryly asking "You do not know anything about it? Me neither."

== See also ==
- List of GURPS publications
