= GURPS Camelot =

Role-playing game supplement for GURPS

- Cover art by John Zeleznik
- Designers: Peggy and Robert Schroeck
- Publishers: Steve Jackson Games
- Publication: December 1991; 35 years ago
- Genres: Arthurian fantasy
- Systems: GURPS

GURPS Camelot is an Arthurian supplement for the GURPS (Generic Universal Role-Playing System), written by Peggy and Robert Schroeck, and published by Steve Jackson Games in 1991.

== Content ==
GURPS Camelot details how Arthurian legend can be used as a setting for a medieval GURPS campaign. Information includes an examination of Arthurian myths, short descriptions of notable people at Camelot, an examination of the historical facts behind the myths, and rules for jousts, siege warfare, and herbal concoctions, as well as suggestions on character creation.

== Publication history ==
GURPS Camelot is a 128-page softcover book written by Peggy and Robert Schroeck, with additional material by Aaron Allston, J. David George, Loyd Blankenship, Steve Jackson, Chris W. McCubbin, Steffan O'Sullivan, and Daniel U. Thibault. Interior art is by Ruth Thompson, Keith Berdak, Carl Anderson, and Larry McDougal, and the cover art is by John Zeleznik.

In the 2014 book Designers & Dragons: The '80s, game historian Shannon Appelcline noted that Steve Jackson Games decided in the early 1990s to cease publishing adventures, and therefore "SJG was now putting out standalone GURPS books rather than the more complex tiered book lines. This included more historical subgenre books. Some, such as GURPS Camelot (1991) and GURPS China (1991), were clearly sub-subgenres, while others like GURPS Old West (1991) and GURPS Middle Ages I (1992) covered genres notably missing before this point."

== Reviews ==
In the February 1993 edition of Dragon (Issue #190), Rick Swan found the "attention to detail is impressive", but thought that it "often reads more like a term paper instead of a collection of neat ideas the designers couldn't wait to share." Swan noted that the book lacked both game-mastering advice and a full-length adventure. He concluded by giving the book an average rating of 3 out of 5, saying that the book "skimps on staging notes and the details of day-to-day existence that might help players bring their characters to life."

== See also ==
- List of GURPS publications
