= GURPS Update =

GURPS Update is a supplement published by Steve Jackson Games in 1989 for the GURPS (Generic Universal RolePlaying System) role-playing system.

== Contents ==
In 1989, Steve Jackson Games published a third edition of their GURPS role-playing system. GURPS Update is an 80-page book by Steve Jackson and David Ladyman that explains how to convert a second-edition GURPS campaign to third edition rules. As reviewer James Wallis noted, "It includes the new sections of rules as well as every single tiny change in wording."

The book also covers weapons rules changes that were made to the GURPS Space, Humanx, Horror, and Japan supplements.

An identically titled GURPS Update was published that explains how to convert a third-edition GURPS campaign to fourth edition rules. It was released as a free PDF and is also included in the GM's screen.

== Reception ==
In the November 1989 edition of Dragon (Issue #151), Jim Bambra thought that this was a good example of "solid support for customers". He believed it would be very useful "if you have the 2nd edition Basic Set and want to upgrade to the 3rd edition with a minimum of expense," but warned that for those who already owned the 3rd edition rules, it would be of much more limited use.

In the June 1989 edition of Games International (Issue #6), James Wallis gave this a double rating: firstly a 4 out of 5 "if you own 2nd edition GURPS and aren't prepared to splash out on the new edition"; and then a 1 out of 5 for everyone else, saying, "If you already have the 3rd edition, or don't play GURPS, it'll be no use to you at all."
