= GURPS Places of Mystery =

Tabletop role-playing game supplement for GURPS

- Designers: Phil Masters; Allison Brooks
- Publishers: Steve Jackson Games
- Publication: 1996; 30 years ago
- Genres: Fantasy
- Systems: GURPS

GURPS Places of Mystery is a supplement by Phil Masters and Allison Brooks, published by Steve Jackson Games in 1996 for the role-playing game system GURPS.

== Contents ==
GURPS Places of Mystery is a supplement which presents both real and legendary world wonders, and how they could be used in fantasy role-playing adventures. Locales include places in Africa, the British Isles (including Stonehenge), and the Far East, as well as fictional location Atlantis.

== Reception ==
In the May 1996 edition of Arcane (Issue 6), Jonathan Palmer was ambivalent about the book, saying, "Places of Mystery is a source of inspiration for referees of any system, with some fascinating 'facts', but it just doesn't go far enough. There are plenty of better 'mysterious places' books on the market and you're smart enough to work out for yourselves how to incorporate the information they contain into your games." He concluded by giving the book a below average rating of 4 out of 10.

In the October 1996 edition of Dragon (Issue #234), Rick Swan called the scope of the book "ambitious", but pointed out that "the designers summarize material from historical and literary sources... enterprising gamemasters could dig most of this out of the local library." But Swan did concede that "for those without access to the right books -- or who have misplaced their library card -- it's a useful resource."

== Reviews ==
- Casus Belli #95
- Australian Realms #29

== See also ==
- List of GURPS publications
