= GURPS Callahan's Crosstime Saloon =

1992 supplement for the GURPS role-playing game

- Ccover by James Warhola
- Designers: Chris W. McCubbin
- Publishers: Steve Jackson Games
- Publication: 1992; 34 years ago
- Genres: Parallel universe
- Systems: GURPS

GURPS Callahan's Crosstime Saloon is a supplement for the GURPS role-playing game. It was written by Chris McCubbin, and published by Steve Jackson Games in 1992. It is based on Spider Robinson's novel Callahan's Crosstime Saloon.

== Contents ==
This is a sourcebook for an alternate world-themed role-playing game based in a fictional bar/space nexus that was created by Spider Robinson in his novel Callahan's Crosstime Saloon.

== Publication history ==
GURPS Callahan's Crosstime Saloon was designed by Chris W. McCubbin, edited by Jeff Koke and Steve Jackson, and published by Steve Jackson Games as a 128-page softcover book. The book features additional material by Spider Robinson, Steve Jackson, and Christian Wagner, and illustrations by Donna Barr, Guy Burcham, Dan Frazier, and Rick Harris with a cover by James Warhola. It was published in 1992.

== Reception ==
Rick Swan reviewed GURPS Callahan's Crosstime Saloon for Dragon magazine #190 (February 1993). According to Swan, Callahan's Crosstime Saloon " works best as a framing device or an interlude in a conventional fantasy or science-fiction campaign, providing the players can tolerate a little whimsy. There are a fair number of new rules, among them guidelines for psi-blocking powers and intoxication effects, but not enough to discourage determined referees from adapting the book to a different game system."

== See also ==
- List of GURPS publications
