= GURPS Fantasy Harkwood =

1988 supplement for the GURPS role-playing game

Action and intrigue and a medieval tourney
- Cover art by Darla Tagrin
- Designers: Aaron Allston; J. David George
- Publishers: Steve Jackson Games
- Publication: 1988; 38 years ago
- Genres: Fantasy
- Systems: GURPS

GURPS Fantasy Harkwood is an fantasy sourcebook for the GURPS (Generic Universal Role-Playing System), written by Aaron Allston and J. David George, and published by Steve Jackson Games in 1988. It is designed for the setting of Yrth introduced in the first edition of GURPS Fantasy.

== Contents ==
GURPS Fantasy Harkwood is a sourcebook containing both a fantasy campaign setting as well as an adventure scenario designed for use with the GURPS Fantasy rules. It details the land of Caithness on the world of Yrth, and in particular both the Barony and city of Harkwood. Although the players can also make use of the magic rules detailed in GURPS Fantasy, Caithness is an area of low magic, making the use of spells difficult.

The book includes chapters on character creation, the land of Caithness, the region of Harkwood, notes for the gamemaster, and rules for jousting tournaments. There is also a full adventure, "Intrigue in Harkwood". Six villains are included, and the gamemaster must choose one of them. They and design the adventure around this villain's motives.

== Publication history ==
Steve Jackson Games published GURPS Fantasy in 1986, as a general set of rules for a fantasy campaign setting called Yrth. Two years later they published Harkwood, a 64-page book written by Aaron Allston and J. David George, with cartography by Carl Manz. Czeslaw Sornal, and C. Mara Lee, illustrations by Guy Burchak, and cover art by Darla Tagrin.

== Reception ==
In the November 1989 edition of Dragon (Issue 151), Jim Bambra commented that due to the low magic content of this setting, "Although players can take on the roles of wizards, Harkwood is really a showcase for the sophisticated and highly playable GURPS combat system, making it suitable for fighters of noble, or not-so-noble status." Although Bambra thought the tournament system was well thought out, letting "players gain familiarity with the combat system and hone their character’s combat skills with little risk to life or limb," he noted with approval that "Harkwood is much more than just a run of the mill medieval tournament; intrigue abounds and the future of the barony is at stake." Although he approved of the idea of having six villains to choose from, Bambra found that it was "both a strength and a weakness. I found the rationales for the motivations of some of the bad guys unconvincing, and found that the clues pointing to their involvement sat awkwardly with the rest of the adventure." He concluded on a positive note, saying, "Harkwood is a good adventure. Strong in medieval flavor, it is ideal for players who like a low magic background to their adventures. Plus, it makes an ideal starting point for any GURPS Fantasy or medieval campaign. While lacking a strong fantasy flavor, Harkwood is well structured and presented, and I recommend it highly."

In the 1989 edition of Riimukiwi (Issue 4), Mikko Kurki-Suonio didn't think much of the background information about Harkwood was usable in a non-GURPS campaign, but the included adventure was very adaptable to different role-playing rules. He thought the adventure was set up well, and noted that "the gamemaster can choose from six villains [...] and a crooked referee may even put a few too many clues." Kurki-Suonio called the adventure "a bit linear, with a certain feeling of being pulled by the nose," and also noted that some work had to be done on the dungeons to prepare them for play, and some non-player characters were missing equipment and statistics. But he called the jousting tournament information a nice addition. He concluded with a recommendation, saying, "In terms of price, Harkwood is still a much better buy than many other commercial adventures — even for non-GURPS players."

== Other reviews ==
- One Thousand and One Nights and One Night Vol. 1, Issue 23 (February 2008)

== See also ==
- List of GURPS publications
