= GURPS Magic =

1989 supplement for the GURPS role-playing game

- Third edition cover
- Designers: Steve Jackson, S. John Ross, Daniel U. Thibault
- Publishers: Steve Jackson Games
- Publication: 1989 (1st edition); 1994 (2nd edition); 2004 (3rd edition)
- Genres: Fantasy
- Systems: GURPS

GURPS Magic is a fantasy magic sourcebook for the GURPS (Generic Universal Role-Playing System), written by Steve Jackson, and was originally published by Steve Jackson Games in 1989. The book expands on the material outlined in the Basic Set, and includes alternative forms of magic for gamemasters to use. A second edition was published in 1994, and a third edition for the fourth edition of GURPS was published in 2004. The first two editions received positive reviews in game periodicals including Games International, Dragon, and White Wolf.

== Contents ==
=== Third edition ===
GURPS Magic is a supplement of magic rules for use in fantasy milieus, an expansion and replacement of the rules in first edition GURPS Fantasy, entirely revised for use with GURPS third edition. The book is detailed, and the spell rules enable the player to custom-design a character's magical abilities, and includes an extensive spell list.

=== Fourth edition ===
This 240-page hardcover book with full color illustrations covers the third edition source books GURPS Magic and GURPS Grimoire and includes additional material.

== Publication history ==
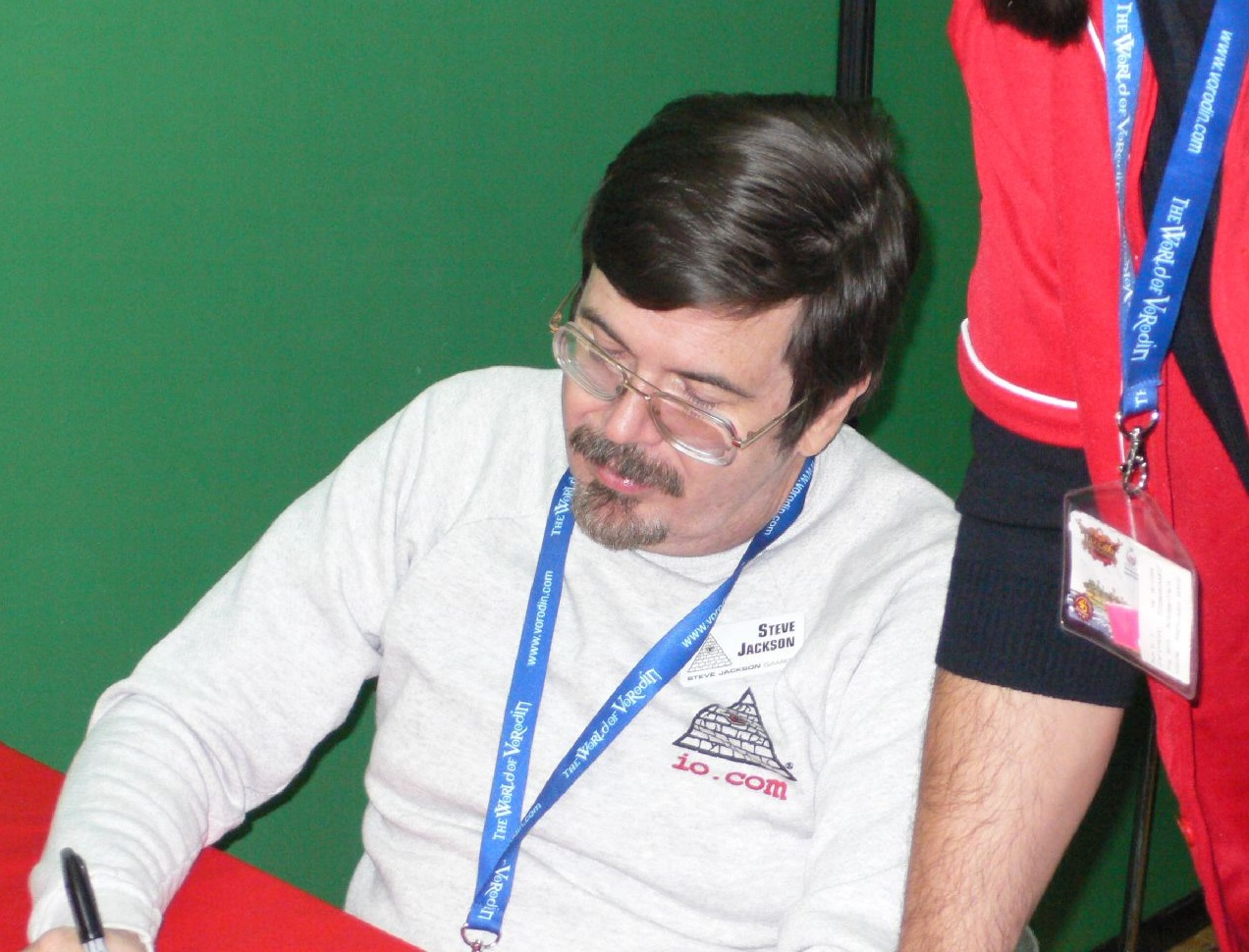
Steve Jackson (pictured in 2006) was the designer of the first edition of the book.

GURPS Magic was originally written by Steve Jackson with Marc Janssen, Walter Milliken, Steffan O'Sullivan, W. Dow Rieder, Brett Slocum, and Daniel U. Thibault, with a cover by Guy Burchak, and was first published by Steve Jackson Games in 1989 as a 112-page book.

== Reception ==
In issue #6 of Games International (June 1989), James Wallis thought the book was not needed by those who already had the previously published GURPS Fantasy. He gave it an average rating of 3 out of 5, saying, "If you use GURPS Fantasy already and are happy with it, stick with it. If you missed it the first time around, GURPS Magic is a worthwhile buy."

In the July 1989 edition of Dragon (Issue #147), Ken Rolston was impressed, commenting, "The GURPS Magic game is an excellent supplement for the GURPS system, an effective expansion of the game's original fantasy magic rules with added features and wise campaign-design guidance. As a FRPG magic supplement, it boasts exceptional virtues in systems and conceptions. As a generic supplement, however, it lacks the distinctive charm and atmosphere of a specific fantasy campaign setting. As a source book for enriching the magical elements in your FRPG campaign, it is useful—perhaps inspirational—regardless of the system you use."

Five years later, in the June 1994 edition of Dragon (Issue #206), Rick Swan gave high marks to the second edition, saying "[Steve] Jackson made a few design choices that may not be to everyone's liking. In order to pack in as many spells as possible, he occasionally skimps on descriptions. [...] Nor does he dictate how much detail the spell provides. The magical-item rules make it difficult to create off-the-wall oddities favored by AD&D mages, like the portable hole and bag of beans. Also, the small amount of new material - a system for limiting the power of wizards, flow charts that show the prerequisites for spells from all colleges - barely justifies a second edition; owners of the first edition can put their money away. These are nitpicks though, irrelevant to the overall impact. A dazzling performance by a virtuoso designer, GURPS Magic is a knock-out."

In the September 1994 edition of White Wolf (Issue #49), David L. Pulver gave the second edition of GURPS Magic a 4 out of 5 overall, commenting, "If you already have the first edition of GURPS Magic, there's no need to buy this one unless your copy is worn out. If you don't have it, and you want to use magic in GURPS, the material offered here is a vast improvement over the skeletal rules of the Basic Set."

== Reviews ==
- Casus Belli #76
- GamesMaster International (Issue 5 - Dec 1990)
- Dragão Brasil #11

== See also ==
- List of GURPS publications
