= Chaos In Kansas =

1989 role-playing game adventure

Chaos In Kansas is a 1989 role-playing game adventure for GURPS published by Steve Jackson Games.

== Plot summary ==
Chaos In Kansas is an adventure in which two scenarios are set in Liberty, Kansas in the 1920s.

== Publication history ==
Chaos In Kansas was written by James M. Hurst, with a cover by Miro Sinovcic, and was published by Steve Jackson Games in 1990 as a 32-page book.

== Reception ==
Paul Mason reviewed Chaos In Kansas for Games International magazine, and gave it 3 stars out of 5, and stated that "All in all, the package delivers value for money, including a description of the town of Liberty which might come in useful."
