= GURPS Timeline =

1992 role-playing game supplement

- Cover art by John Zeleznik
- Designers: Chris W. McCubbin
- Publishers: Steve Jackson Games
- Publication: 1992
- Genres: Time travel
- Systems: GURPS

GURPS Timeline is a sourcebook published by Steve Jackson Games (SJG) in 1992 for the GURPS role-playing game that provides a gamemaster with suggestions on how players can interact with important historical events.

== Contents ==
Timeline is designed for GURPS campaigns where the players are time travellers, and offers a chronology of human history. Each page is divided into two columns: one contains the historical timeline, and the other contains suggestions on important events the gamemaster can use, sometimes with suggestions about potential scenarios.

For example, beside the entry for the First Sack of Rome in 390 BCE, Timeline suggests ways that the player characters could interfere with the attack on Rome.

The book also contains a bibliography of historical texts that the gamemaster can use to create a more historically accurate milieu.

== Publication history ==
In 1982, SJG published GURPS (Generic Universal Role-Playing System), a role-playing system that could be used with any genre from fantasy to horror to science fiction. They followed this up with many sourcebooks outlining different genres that could be used with the GURPS rules system, including 1992's GURPS Timeline, a 128-page softcover book written by Chris McCubben, with cover art by John Zeleznik and interior art by Carl Anderson, Timothy Bradstreet, Laura Eisenhour, John Hartwell, and Topper Helmers.

== Reception ==
Writing in Asche des Phoenix, Andreas Wichter commented that in addition to general historical works, he found the specifics of Timeline extremely useful when preparing a historical campaign.

Sean Patrick Fannon, in The Fantasy Roleplaying Gamer's Bible, wrote that Timeline "is generally accepted as an extraordinary sourcebook for anyone running games set on Earth."

== Other reviews and commentary ==
- The Last Province (Issue 4 - June / July 1993)
