= GURPS Players' Book =

Tabletop fantasy role-playing game supplement

Character design rules from the GURPS basic set
- Cover art by Guy Burchak
- Designers: Steve Jackson
- Publishers: Steve Jackson Games
- Publication: 1988; 38 years ago
- Genres: multi-genre
- Systems: GURPS

GURPS Players' Book is a supplement published by Steve Jackson Games in 1988 for the role-playing game system GURPS (Generic Universal Role-Playing System).

== Contents ==
In 1988, Steve Jackson Games published the third edition of the Basic Set rules for GURPS. The GURPS Players' Book is a supplement which reprints the rules for character design and skills.

== Publication history ==
GURPS Players' Book is a 96-page book written by Steve Jackson, with a cover by Guy Burchak, and interior art by Donna Barr, Angela Bostick, Guy Burchack, Dan Carroll, Graham Chaffee, Larry Dixon, C. Bradford Gorby, Wayne A. Lee, C. Mara Lee, Denis Loubet, Jean E. Martin, David G. Martin, Kyle Miller, Dan Panosian, George Pratt, Terry Tidwell, Jason Waltrip, John Waltrip, Gary Washington, George Webber, and Dan Willems. It was published by Steve Jackson Games in 1988.

== Reception ==
In the September 1989 edition of Dragon (Issue #149), Jim Bambra indicated that because this is a reprint of material from the GURPS Basic Set, "You do not need this book in order to play the GURPS game, since it contains nothing new." However, Bambra admitted that owning it would be a timesaver, since "it does ease play by minimizing the number of times the rulebook has to change hands during play, and it allows players to design characters without having to steal the GM's book."
