= GURPS CthulhuPunk =

1995 supplement for the GURPS role-playing game

- Publishers: Steve Jackson Games
- Publication: 1995; 31 years ago
- Genres: Cthulhu Mythos, cyberpunk
- Systems: GURPS

GURPS CthulhuPunk is a Cthulhu Mythos cyberpunk sourcebook for the GURPS (Generic Universal Role-Playing System), published by Steve Jackson Games in 1995.

== Contents ==
GURPS CthulhuPunk is a supplement in which the Cthulhu Mythos is brought into a cyberpunk future, offering a full campaign setting with Mythos lore, creatures, cults, rules, gear, and adventure seeds adapted for a dark, high‑tech world.

== Reviews ==
- Scifi.com
- Australian Realms #25
- Dragão Brasil
- Casus Belli #87
- Rollespilsmagasinet Fønix (Issue 11 - December/January 1995)
- RPG Review (Issue 18 - Dec 2012)

== See also ==
- List of GURPS publications
