= GURPS Prime Directive =

- Fourth edition cover
- Publishers: Steve Jackson Games
- Publication: 2002 (3rd edition); 2005 (4th edition)
- Genres: Sci-fi
- Systems: GURPS

GURPS Prime Directive is a sourcebook for GURPS, first published in 2002. It is based on previous RPG setting set in the Star Fleet Universe, based in turn upon Star Trek itself. It has several associated sourcebooks.

== Overview ==
GURPS Prime Directive allows players to play both civilian and Star Fleet characters, also allows cross-genre moves to be made, and includes limited elements of the Traveller Universe.

== Publication history ==
After the folding of Task Force Games and the cancellation of the original Prime Directive line, Amarillo Design Bureau, Inc., the new publishers of Star Fleet Universe games, were left with the question of what to do with PD. They were primarily a wargame company, and the poor sales of the supplements were cause for a reexamination. Eventually, they approached Steve Jackson Games to use the Powered by GURPS format.

GURPS Prime Directive, depicts the world of Star Fleet Battles, and is part of the "Powered by GURPS" line. It was published in 2002 under license by Amarillo Design Bureau. Task Force Games produced GURPS Prime Directive for the third (2000) and fourth edition (2004) of GURPS. Amarillo Design Bureau continued publication of Prime Directive books for the GURPS, d20, and d20 Modern game systems.

Originally GURPS Prime Directive, the GURPS Klingons imperial source book and GURPS Module Prime Alpha module were released under the third edition of GURPS. The new fourth edition of GURPS prompted a rework of the previous major books and a delay of the then-upcoming Romulans sourcebook (which became one of the first 4th Edition GURPS supplements). Module Prime Alpha (and its intended sequel, Module Prime Beta) were dropped from the line, due to poor sales.

The following fourth Edition books were also released for GURPS Prime Directive.

== Books ==
- GURPS Federation
- GURPS Klingons
- GURPS Romulans
- Dread Pirate Aldo
- Planet Aldo
- Starship Aldo

== Reviews ==
- White Wolf #48
- Valkyrie #1
- Pyramid
