= GURPS Old West =

Role-playing game sourcebook

- Artwork by David Patrick Menahan
- Designers: Ann Dupuis; Liz Tornabene; Robert E. Smith; Lynda Manning Schwartz
- Publishers: Steve Jackson Games
- Publication: 1991; 35 years ago
- Genres: Western fantasy
- Systems: GURPS

GURPS Old West is a supplement published by Steve Jackson Games in 1991 for GURPS (Generic Universal Role-Playing System).

== Content ==
GURPS Old West provides details of how to introduce a Western setting to GURPS. Details include various forms of transportation, and activities such as panning for gold, robbing trains or banks, and cattle drives. Some exploration of Southwest Amerindian culture is included, with suggestions on how native religion could be adapted for spellcasting. New rules around gunplay and spellcasting are also included.

== Publication history ==
GURPS Old West is a 128-page softcover book written by Ann Dupuis, Liz Tornabene, Robert E. Smith, and Lynda Manning Schwartz, with additional material by Mike Hurst, Steve Jackson, and Loyd Blankenship. Interior art is by Topper Helmers and Carl Anderson, and cover art is by David Patrick Menahan. It was published by Steve Jackson Games in 1991.

In the 2014 book Designers & Dragons: The '80s, game historian Shannon Appelcline noted that Steve Jackson Games decided in the early 1990s to cease publishing adventures, and therefore "SJG was now putting out standalone GURPS books rather than the more complex tiered book lines. This included more historical subgenre books. Some, such as GURPS Camelot (1991) and GURPS China (1991), were clearly sub-subgenres, while others like GURPS Old West (1991) and GURPS Middle Ages I (1992) covered genres notably missing before this point."

== Reception ==
In the February 1993 edition of Dragon (Issue #190), Rick Swan pointed out that "the emphasis here is on drama over dry facts. Wherever reality contradicts John Wayne movies, the designers aren't afraid to goose the truth a bit, and they encourage referees to do the same." Nonetheless, Swan found that "The book abounds with inviting activities for PCs to pursue, along with sound advice for staging memorable encounters." He concluded by giving the book an excellent rating of 4.5 out of 5, saying, "The combination of diligent research and imaginative embellishments makes for an unbeatable package — one that players and referees alike ought to relish. After reading from start to finish, I was hungry for more. And that’s about the best recommendation a sourcebook can get."
