= Tredroy =

1989 role-playing game supplement for GURPS

Tredroy is a 1989 role-playing game supplement for GURPS published by Steve Jackson Games.

== Contents ==
Tredroy is a supplement in which the religions and politics of the city of Tredroy on the world of Yrth are described.

== Publication history ==
Tredroy was written by Alexander Van Thorn, with art by Guy Burchak, and was published by Steve Jackson Games in 1989 as a 64-page book.

== Reception ==
Ian Marsh reviewed Tredroy for Games International magazine, and gave it 4 stars out of 5, and stated that "History, economics, customs and the like are dealt with in sufficient detail to spark off plenty of scenario ideas, but not so much that they become boring."

== Reviews ==
- Dragon #156 (April, 1990)
