= Zombietown U.S.A. =

Zombietown U.S.A. is a 1988 role-playing game adventure published by Steve Jackson Games for GURPS.

== Plot summary ==
Zombietown U.S.A. is an adventure in which the campaign setting is centered on a California town of Black Lake which has been plagued by evil, optionally featuring the futuristic GURPS Autoduel setting, and the Zombietown adventure combines mystery and action against the undead.

== Publication history ==
Zombietown U.S.A. was written by Barry Link, with art by David Welling and Ken Trobaugh and published by Steve Jackson Games in 1988 as a 64-page book.

== Reception ==
Lawrence Schick in his book Heroic Worlds called Zombietown U.S.A. a "Great title."

== Reviews ==
- Abyss #42 (Summer, 1988)
