= GURPS Conan: Beyond Thunder River =

GURPS Conan: Beyond Thunder River is a 1988 role-playing game adventure published by Steve Jackson Games for GURPS.

== Plot summary ==
GURPS Conan: Beyond Thunder River is an adventure in which Conan searches the Pictish Frontier to find Zogar Sag before the witch doctor can unite the Picts and launch an attack on Aquilonian outposts.

== Publication history ==
Conan Beyond Thunder River was written by W.G. Armintrout, with a cover by Denis Loubet and illustrations by Dan Carroll and published by Steve Jackson Games in 1988 as a 64-page book.

== Reviews ==
- Analog Science Fiction and Fact
