= Orcslayer =

Combat scenarios for "Man to Man" and "GURPS"

- Cover by Jean and David Martin
- Designers: Steve Jackson, Warren Spector
- Publishers: Steve Jackson Games
- Publication: 1985; 41 years ago
- Genres: Fantasy
- Systems: GURPS

Orcslayer, subtitled "A Combat Supplement for Man to Man", is a collection of combat-oriented scenarios published by Steve Jackson Games (SJG) in 1985 that was originally designed for use with Steve Jackson's Man to Man, and later for the role-playing system GURPS.

== Contents ==
Orcslayer includes nine combat scenarios, each linked by role-playing encounters, in which the player characters deal with the Orcmen invading Caithness. The scenarios are set in the fictional fantasy world of Yrth, the same setting used in later supplements for the GURPS Fantasy line. The scenarios are chronologically linked, and each one is a bit more difficult that the previous one. Eventually the characters realize that there is a much greater danger beyond their immediate objective.

== Publication history ==
In 1985, Steve Jackson was putting the finishing touches to his new role-playing system GURPS, but it wouldn't be ready in time for the 1985 Origins Game Fair. Instead, Jackson printed just the combat system, titling it Steve Jackson's Man to Man, and released it at Origins. Jackson and Warren Spector also completed a collection of nine scenarios for the combat system, and published it in 1985 as a 40-page book titled Orcslayer, with cover art by Jean and David Martin, and interior art by Mara Lee and Kyle Miller.

== Reception ==
In Issue 43 of Different Worlds, Dale L. Kemper commented "Orcslayer is a good companion to Man To Man, and Steve Jackson Games have promised more supplements to aid in the exploration of the Kingdom of Caithness. The organization of the supplement is one of the great things it has to offer - there is never any problem finding what you need in it. There are also ample areas where a creative gamemaster can embellish the situation to his heart's content." Kemper concluded, "Hopefully it will not be too long a wait to see what other supplements come out for Man To Man."

In Issue 39 of Abyss, Dave Nalle noted "The situations are pretty much standard fantasy fare, but they are well put together and while the general events are left fairly open-ended, the specific combat situations contain a great deal of detailed tactical information." Nalle concluded, "The whole presentation is well balanced, allowing the GMM a lot of freedom, while giving him useful supporting detail."

In Issue 21 of Breakout!, John Tindall commented, "I had thought that a module that was essentially only supporting a combat system would be boring. Happily it is not so. The adventure provides a good setting and plenty of changing background to surpass other 'introductory adventures'.
