= GURPS Horror =

Sourcebook for GURPS

- Cover art by Michael Whelan
- Designers: Scott Haring
- Publishers: Steve Jackson Games
- Publication: 1987 (first edition)); 1990 (second edition); 2002 (third edition); 2011 (fourth edition)
- ISBN: 0-7869-3136-1

GURPS Horror is a horror sourcebook for the GURPS (Generic Universal Role-Playing System), written by Scott Haring, and first published by Steve Jackson Games in 1987.

== Contents ==
GURPS Horror is a GURPS supplement with rules for including horror in games. Its includes guidelines for character creation and backgrounds for adventures. The second edition added guidelines on using historical periods, and information on the Illuminati.

== Publication history ==
GURPS Horror was written by Scott Haring, featuring a cover by Michael Whelan, and was first published by Steve Jackson Games in 1987 as a 96-page book. GURPS Horror was one of the broad genre books that was published after the GURPS Basic Set. The second edition was written by Scott Haring and J.M. Caparula and published in 1990 as a 128-page book.

The third edition was published in 2002, with added content by Kenneth Hite, influenced by his preceding role-playing game Nightmares of Mine. The fourth edition was published in 2011.

== Reception ==
David F. Nalle reviewed GURPS Horror for issue 47 of Different Worlds magazine (Fall 1987) and stated that "It is no coincidence that the rules sections of GURPS Horror are strong while much of the background is weak. I think that the authors realize that there was little purpose in going over ground which had already been well-covered, so they provided additional material where they could and have left GURPS Horror to succeed on the natural merits of its mechanics. This was basically the right choice, and while I would never recommend GURPS Horror as one's only source for horror role-playing, it has some new ideas and in combination with GURPS itself the mechanics are definitely more versatile and comprehensive than those found in any of the more background-oriented games."

Ken Rolston reviewed the first edition of GURPS Horror for Dragon magazine #138 (October 1988). Rolston wrote in his conclusion: "The GURPS system works better than COC's basic role-playing system for tactical role-playing, and those already playing GURPS games will find the GURPS Horror game's mechanics useful. For a heroic supernatural campaign similar in tone to most fantasy role-playing campaigns (with the PCs as fearless crusaders against evil occult horrors), this supplement is a suitable system."

Rick Swan reviewed the second edition of GURPS Horror for Dragon magazine #186 (October 1992). Swan writes in his conclusion: "Though sketchy in places and unfocused as a whole, the GURPS Horror game still stands as the best horror overview on the market. Referees who enjoy creating their own adventures will find plenty of raw material here, particularly in the Cabal chapter and creature rosters. However, nothing crucial has been added in the new version, certainly nothing that automatically renders the first edition obsolete. Owners of the first edition can safely skip the second and spend their money elsewhere, perhaps on a copy of the GURPS Psionics game."

The fourth edition won the 2012 Silver Ennie Award for "Best Supplement" and "Best Writing".

== Reviews ==
- Envoyer #6
- Casus Belli #79

== See also ==
- List of GURPS publications
