= GURPS Fantasy =

1986 supplement for the GURPS role-playing game

- Fourth edition cover (2004)
- Designers: William H. Stoddard
- Publishers: Steve Jackson Games
- Publication: 1986 (first edition; for third edition GURPS); 1990 (second edition; for third edition GURPS); 2004 (third edition for fourth edition GURPS)
- Genres: Fantasy
- Systems: GURPS

GURPS Fantasy is a fantasy genre sourcebook for the GURPS (Generic Universal Role-Playing System), written by Steve Jackson, and first published by Steve Jackson Games in 1986. It presents a magic system and background information for the fantasy campaign world of Yrth. A second edition was published in 1990 as GURPS Fantasy: The Magical World of Yrth. The fourth edition of GURPS separates the magic from the setting into the setting book GURPS Banestorm.

== Contents ==
The GURPS Basic Set (1986), contained no magic rules, and was supplemented by the first edition of GURPS Fantasy in 1986. This contained a detailed magic system and the background campaign world of Yrth. It also contained character creation, nonhuman races, magical creatures, and monsters. The second edition of GURPS Fantasy separated out GURPS Magic.

The fantasy world of Yrth, was first introduced in Orcslayerin 1985, the only supplement for Steve Jackson's Man to Man.

The second edition, GURPS Fantasy: The Magical World of Yrth, 1990, second edition 1995, was based on the campaign-setting in the first edition of GURPS Fantasy. The world of Yrth is described in much greater detail; the descriptions of the various kingdoms take 70 pages. The chief religions of Christianity, Islam, and Judaism receive much more attention, and there are a lot of guidelines on how to set up an Yrth campaign, such as what elements to include in a game, and what to emphasize and what to play down. A two-color map is included. The magic rules were expanded and re-issued as a second edition, GURPS Magic in 1989, with a second edition in 1994. The magic rules were eventually included in the main GURPS rules set.

The third edition of GURPS Fantasy was published in 2004 for the fourth edition of GURPS. It covers the creation of many different types of fantasy settings including, high and 'low, dark and light, sword and sorcery, and myth. Example races are provided for all the standard fantasy tropes. The Yrth setting was moved to a new book called GURPS Banestorm, published in October 2005.

== Publication history ==
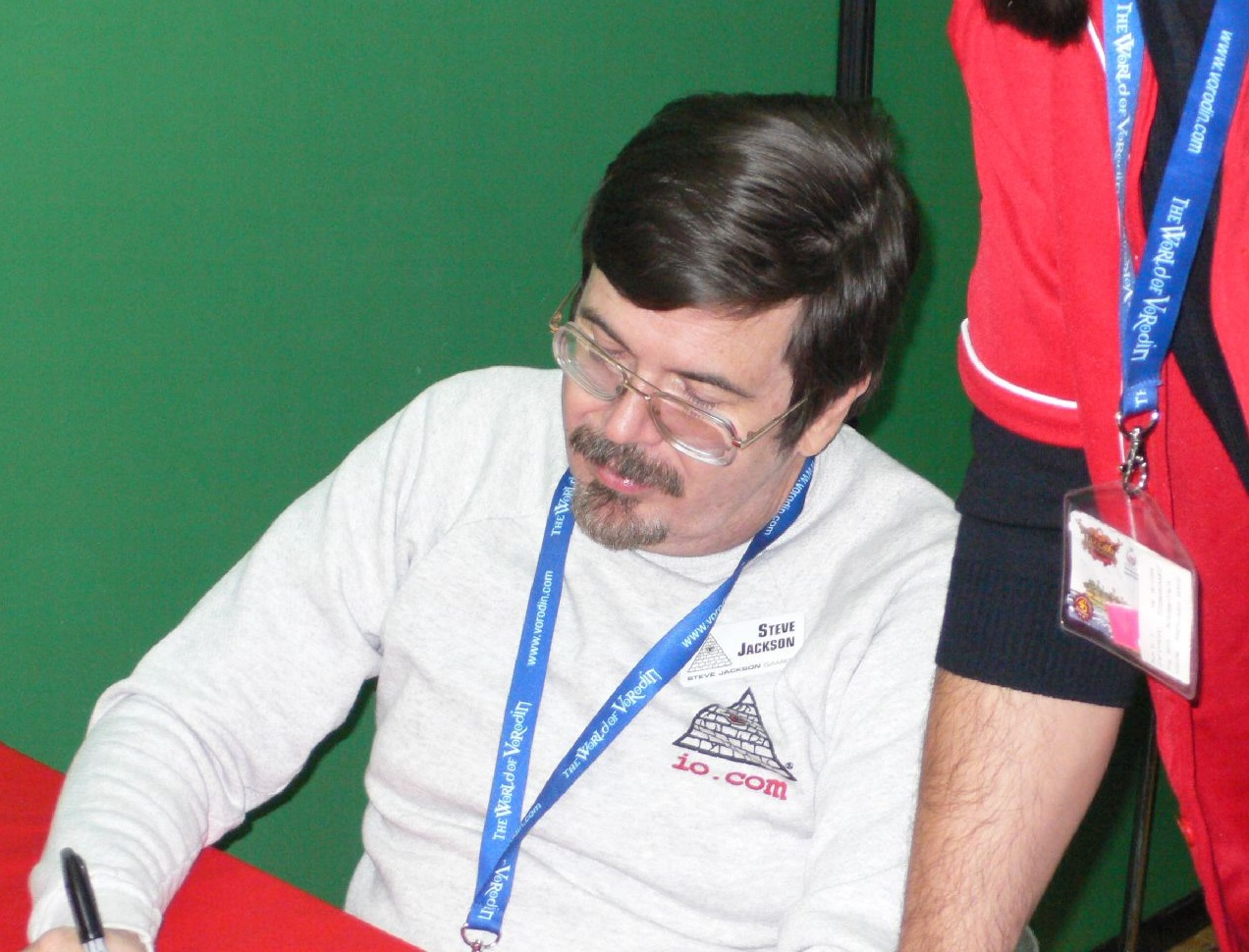
The first edition was designed by Steve Jackson (pictured in 2006).

GURPS Fantasy was written by Steve Jackson, with a cover by Denis Loubet, and was first published by Steve Jackson Games in 1986 as a 100-page book. The second edition, GURPS Fantasy: The Magical World of Yrth was written by Kirk Tate and Janet Naylor, with a cover by Kirk Reinert, and was published by Steve Jackson Games in 1990 as a 144-page book.

GURPS Fantasy for the fourth edition of GURPS, was published in 2004.

== Reception ==
Jim Bambra reviewed GURPS Fantasy for Dragon magazine #131 (March 1988). He felt that the book presents the magic system and background to the campaign world "in a highly satisfying way" and that "Best of all, it works!" On the campaign world, he comments: "Rich in background and plundering freely from Earth history and religion, the world of Yrth is easily accessible and nicely presented." Bambra concludes: "Extensive commentary on the countries of Yrth and plenty of staging tips make this a strong contender on the campaign front. GURPS Fantasy is an impressive product that is well worth a look."

J. Michael Caparula reviewed GURPS Fantasy in Space Gamer/Fantasy Gamer No. 81. Caparula commented that "GURPS: Fantasy can be seen as 180 degrees apart from something detailed and imposing like Harn. I think I'll look for something in the middle of that spectrum: easy to use, but still interesting and inventive."

The July 1990 edition of Games International (Issue 16) reviewed the second edition, and commented that it was "a setting that anyone could knock up in a spare weekend." The reviewer concluded that it was designed for "those gamers who are in need of a fantasy world in a hurry."

Rick Swan reviewed GURPS Fantasy II for Dragon magazine #198 (October 1993). Swan comments in his evaluation: "I suspect that Laws wants us to be intrigued by the contrast between the utopian tribesmen and the chaotic deities. But I was never intrigued as much as I was amused, perhaps because it's hard to get worked up over a deity resembling a giant moose. The nuts and bolts of the relationship between the deities and the tribesmen remain unclear; as that's the crux of the book, it's a significant flaw. Despite the tantalizing possibilities, Laws hedges his bets and never cuts loose. I'd liked to have seen something really mad, like a village of Footless, or a gang war between the Gopher God and Mr. Moose. Adventures in the Mad Lands boasts an exquisite premise, but it could use a bolder vision."

== Reviews ==
- Dragão Brasil (Issue 6; September 1995) (in Portuguese)

== Awards ==
- The first edition of GURPS Fantasy was a Gamers' Choice award-winner.
- At the 1987 Origins Awards, GURPS Fantasy was a nominee for Best Roleplaying Supplement of 1986.
- At the 2006 Origins Awards, GURPS 4e Fantasy was a nominee for Best Roleplaying Game of 2005.

== See also ==
- List of GURPS publications
