= Loyd Blankenship =

American hacker and writer

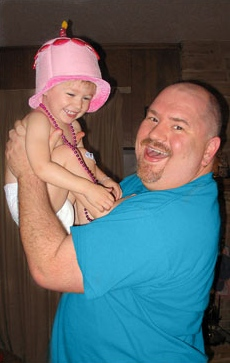
- Blankenship with his niece (2006)
- Born: Loyd Blankenship
- Occupations: Hacker; writer
- Known for: Hacker Manifesto
- Notable work: GURPS Cyberpunk

Loyd Blankenship, better known by his pseudonym The Mentor, is an American computer hacker and writer. He has been active since the 1970s, when he was a member of the hacker groups Extasyy Elite and Legion of Doom.

== Writings ==
=== Hacker Manifesto ===
He is the author of The Conscience of a Hacker (also known as The Hacker Manifesto); the essay was written after he was arrested and was published in the ezine Phrack.

=== Role-playing games ===
Blankenship was hired by Steve Jackson Games in 1989. He authored the cyberpunk role-playing sourcebook GURPS Cyberpunk, the manuscript of which was seized in a 1990 raid of Steve Jackson Games headquarters by the U.S. Secret Service. The raid resulted in the subsequent legal case Steve Jackson Games, Inc. v. United States Secret Service.
