= Dan Smith (artist) =

American illustrator and graphic artist

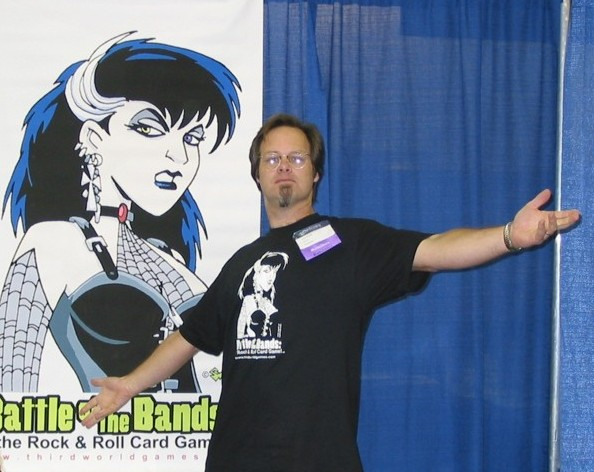
Dan Smith at Origins in 2002

Dan Smith is an American illustrator and graphic artist known for his work for Wizards of the Coast, FASA, White Wolf, Steve Jackson Games, Iron Crown, Hasbro, Nintendo, and Namco.

While known primarily as an illustrator, Dan Smith is also a designer of family card games, including Battle of the Bands, Portable Adventures and King of Crime.

Dan Smith has a variety of illustration styles ranging from kid friendly to teen edgy. His black-and-white work for GURPS became so prominent in the 1990s, he became the unofficial 'house artist'. One of his techniques was to photograph friends in poses as illustration models. This allows friends to flip through role-playing game books and see themselves on the pages dressed as wizards and secret agents.

Dan Smith, with fellow graphic designers Jeff Koke and Derek Pearcy, won the 1997 Origins Award for Best Graphic Presentation of a Roleplaying Game, Adventure, or Supplement for the role-playing game In Nomine. He also garnered a nomination for best traditional card game and supplement for his seminal Battle of the Bands and its sequel, Backstage Pass.
