= GURPS Middle Ages I =

Role-playing game sourcebook

- Cover by Rowena Morrill
- Designers: Graeme Davis; Michael Hurst
- Publishers: Steve Jackson Games
- Publication: 1993; 33 years ago
- Genres: Historical fantasy
- Systems: GURPS

GURPS Middle Ages I is a sourcebook for running a Middle Ages themed GURPS campaign. It is a part of the extensive GURPS "generic" roleplaying system.

== Contents ==
GURPS Middle Ages I is a supplement which focuses on English history going back from the Dark Ages to the Renaissance, covering topics including Saxon law as it developed, the Celtic church and its influence, and the effects of the Hundred Years' War. The book includes a chapter on spellcasting with simple rules for rune magic as well as Hellenistic charms. The book also includes a "Medieval Bestiary" built from background notes and game statistics for mythological creatures taken from that era.

== Publication history ==
GURPS Middle Ages I was designed by Graeme Davis and Michael Hurst, edited by Steve Jackson, and published by Steve Jackson Games as a 128-page softcover book. Illustrations are by Ruth Thompson, Carl Anderson, Thomas Baxa, Angela Bostick, Dan Carroll, Evan Dorkin, Rick Lowry, and Rob Prior, with a cover by Rowena Morrill. After the Secret Service raid on SJG, the company stopped publishing adventures for financial reasons, and started releasing more standalone GURPS supplements; this included a focus on historical supplements like GURPS Middle Ages I, a subgenre that the game had yet to explore. As of 2002 it is in its second edition.

== Reception ==
Rick Swan reviewed GURPS Middle Ages I for Dragon magazine #190 (February 1993). He notes that although "the fantasy elements are well-chosen, the straight history makes for the most provocative reading" but concludes that "despite the meticulous research, the book's lack of focus often makes for a tough ride. In most cases, the material is assigned to neat, discrete compartments. History goes over here, fantasy stays over there, and rarely do the designers make an effort to show how the two complement each other. The perfunctory campaigning chapter provides broad suggestions for designing adventures but few usable specifics. Though the book presents a river of information, it's up to the referee to sift the gold from the silt."
