= Death Test =

Death Test is a 1978 fantasy role-playing game adventure for The Fantasy Trip published by Metagaming Concepts.

== Plot summary ==
Death Test is an adventure that centers on a test devised by the Thorz, the ruler of the city of Ardonirane, to test potential recruits for his army.

== Publication history ==
Metagaming published MicroQuest #1, Death Test (1978), which was a short adventure intended for solo play in use with either Melee or Wizard. Death Test was written by Steve Jackson, and was published by Metagaming Concepts in 1978 as a 20-page digest-sized book with counters in a zip-locked bag, also published in the same year as a digest-sized box with a booklet, counters, and a die.

Death Test 2 is a sequel to Death Test, in which a second labyrinth was built after the Thorz determined the original Death Test failed to weed out unworthy warriors.

On December 26, 2017, Steve Jackson announced he had re-acquired rights to The Fantasy Trip products he authored for Metagaming, specifically Melee, Wizard, Death Test, Death Test 2, Advanced Melee, Advanced Wizard, In the Labyrinth, and Tollenkar's Lair. Death Test and Death Test 2 were re-released in a combined edition in 2019 by Steve Jackson Games after Jackson re-acquired the copyright for the TFT products he authored for Metagaming.

== Reception ==
Robert C. Kirk reviewed Death Test for Pegasus magazine and stated that "Death Test is a fun dungeon to explore. Foes and traps are challenging but not insurmountable. It is a dungeon with a rational purpose and not a 'stocked' hole in the ground. It is clever without being silly. It is highly recommended."

== Reviews ==
- Magia i Miecz (Issue 1 – 1993) (Polish) (as "Śmiertelna Próba")
