= GURPS Space Adventures =

1991 supplement for the GURPS role-playing game

Voyages to interstellar danger
- Cover art by Alan Gutierrez
- Designers: William A. Barton; Thomas S. Gressman; David L. Pulver
- Publishers: Steve Jackson Games
- Publication: 1991; 35 years ago
- Genres: Science fiction
- Systems: GURPS

GURPS Space Adventures is a science fiction sourcebook for the GURPS (Generic Universal Role-Playing System), written by William A. Barton, Thomas S. Gressman, and David L. Pulver, and published by Steve Jackson Games in 1991. It is designed to be used with GURPS Space.

== Plot summary ==
GURPS Space Adventures contains three adventures intended for use with GURPS Space:

- "Rebirth"
- "Beware the Health Police"
- "Raid on Sterling"

== Publication history ==
Steve Jackson Games (SJG) published GURPS Space in 1988, one of the broad genre books that followed the publication of the GURPS Basic Set (1986). GURPS Space it was followed by several sourcebooks including the GURPS Space Atlases (1988-1991), GURPS Space Bestiary (1990), and GURPS Aliens (1990).

GURPS Space Adventures used this science-fiction framework for three adventures, written by William A. Barton, Thomas S. Gressman, and David L. Pulver, with artwork by Donna Barr, C. Brent Ferguson, Ruth Thompson, and L. A. Williams, and cover art by Alan Gutierrez. SJG published the 128-page softcover book in 1991.

== Reception ==
In the September 1993 edition of Dragon (Issue #197), Allen Varney thought two of the adventures were "no more than competent, unremarkable science fiction." But he found the third adventure, Beware the Health Police, to be "a dazzling mix of cosmic adventure and comic invention." Varney thought this adventure alone was worth the price of the book, calling it "Great, goofy fun."

== Reviews ==
- Polyhedron #75

== See also ==
- List of GURPS publications
