= Grail Quest (The Fantasy Trip) =

Grail Quest is a solitaire Arthurian fantasy combat adventure published by Metagaming Concepts in 1980 that uses the combat rules from The Fantasy Trip.

== Plot summary ==
In Grail Quest, the single player controls a party of up to three Knights of the Round Table and their retinue, who travel across Arthurian Britain searching for the Holy Grail, as well as helping those in need and accepting combat challenges from other knights that they encounter. The game can be played solo, or two player can take opposing sides, one playing the knights, the other the encounters.

The game is playable using the combat rules of The Fantasy Trip, or its predecessors, Melee and Wizard.

== Publication history ==
Grail Quest was written by Guy W. McLimore, Jr., and was published by Metagaming Concepts in 1980 as a digest-sized box with a 32-page book, counters, and a die.

As game historian Shannon Appelcine noted in the 2014 book Designers & Dragons, "After the publication of The Fantasy Trip, Metagaming continued publishing releases, which initially consisted of additional MicroQuest adventures, including Guy McLimore's Arthurian Grail Quest (1980); after Steve Jackson left the company, and following the publication of Grail Quest, McLimore became the new line editor for The Fantasy Trip."

== Reception ==
In the October 1980 edition of The Space Gamer (Issue No. 32), Steve Winter admired this game, calling it, "a great little MicroQuest. I never knew being good could be so much fun. If you would rather defend justice and honor under the clear blue skies of Britain than go mucking about underground robbing tombs, you'll love Grail Quest."

In the January 1981 edition of Dragon (Issue #45), Robert Camino noted that although designer McLimore "does a fine job given the nature of the game, it still suffers from the problems that programmed adventures fall prey to. Though the design can be made challenging by presenting formidable obstacles, there is little opportunity for the players to exercise skill, if the game is played solitaire." As an example, Camino pointed out that jousts, the preferred method of combat in this game, used no skill whatsoever, being "very much a matter of dice rolling." Camino concluded by questioning the game's ability to hold a player's attention, saying, "the chances of repeated playings are slim as players become frustrated at their inability to be able to influence the course of events by their skill. The sense of being puppets on a string is pronounced and definitely not consistent with the fundamental independence of knighthood."

== Other reviews ==
- "From the Horse's Mouth", Pegasus #10 (Oct 1982) from Judges Guild
