= Starleader: Assault! =

Combat module for science-fiction table-top role-playing game

- Designers: Howard Thompson
- Publishers: Metagaming
- Years active: 1982 to 1983
- Genres: Science-Fiction Role-Playing Game
- Systems: Starleader

Starleader: Assault! is a science fiction microgame published by Metagaming Concepts in 1982 that was designed to introduce the rules of combat with firearms for a forthcoming science fiction role-playing game that did not get published before Metagaming went out of business.

== Description ==
Starleader: Assault! is a set of rules for building characters and engaging in ranged combat using a variety of futuristic weapons. A map of a starship is included.

=== Character generation ===
The player distributes 32 points among three abilities: Prowess (PR), Emotion (EM), and Intelligence (IQ), although IQ must be at least 10, and PR and EM must be at least 8. The final step is to equip the character with weapons and armor.

=== Combat ===
Each round of combat, the character starts with 8 action points, although points can be subtracted if the character is carrying certain weapons or armor. Once final action points are calculated, the character's Prowess is added to determine an initiative order -- the highest sum of Prowess and action points going first. When it is a character's turn, the character can spend its action points on moving and performing various actions. An enemy can conduct counterfire during a character's turn.

When firing a weapon, the character's abilities have no bearing on success. A hit is determined by rolling four dice to try to get a number less than a value determined by adding the weapon's density to the target’s size, and subtracting the size of any obstacle in the way.

Since Starleader rules focus on combat with firearms, it also includes a rudimentary conversion guide for adapting melee combat from Metagmaing's previously published games The Fantasy Trip or Melee.

=== Scenarios ===
Four scenarios are included:

- "The Rescue of Princess Rulian": A two-player game where one player tries to rescue a kidnapped princess from the other player.
- "Krotic's Treasure": Four on four combat
- "Random Piracy": Three crew and some passengers against pirates
- "Random Raids": A scenario designed by a gamemaster or the players.

== Publication history ==
In 1977, Metagaming Concepts pioneered the concept of the microgame, a small, simple wargame packaged in a ziplock bag. The first in Metagaming's MicroGame line was Ogre, a mini-wargame designed by Metagaming employee Steve Jackson. The third game in the MicroGame series was Jackson's Melee, and #6 was Jackson's Wizard.

Jackson wanted to develop a role-playing game to rival Dungeons & Dragons, and brought together the rules for Melee and Wizard to form what he called The Fantasy Trip (TFT). Jackson expected this would be sold as one boxed set, but when Howard Thompson, owner of Metagaming, decided to release it as four separate books, and changed the company's production methods so that Jackson would not be able to check the final proofs of the game, Jackson left Metagaming, founded Steve Jackson Games and enjoyed almost immediate success.

Thompson was chagrined that one of Metagaming's most notable successes was Jackson's The Fantasy Trip, and decided to develop a science fiction role-playing game titled Starleader that would be more popular than Jackson's games. As a first step, Thompson designed and released the combat rules for the new role-playing game, Starleader: Assault!, the 21st game in the MicroGame line. It proved to be one of Metagaming's most unpopular MicroGames. Metagaming promoted the future publication of Starleader and supplements such as Starleader: Warships, but the company went out of business shortly after Starleader: Assault was published.

== Reception ==
In The Space Gamer No. 61, William A. Barton found many problems with the rules, including the fact that character skills have no bearing on successful combat. "Johnny Starslayer, with a prowess of 14, has no better chance to hit a certain target than Eddie Earthslogger, with a prowess of 8, provided they're using the same weapon and firing at the same target at the same distance and angle." He noted that the only use for a character's Intelligence was to determine which high-tech weapons the character can use, saying, "This is a shaky assumption at best — higher [Tech Level] weapons do not necessarily take a higher intelligence to operate. After all, a pistol's a pistol's a pistol — whether it's a slug-thrower or an energy gun." Barton commented that the rules around combat were fairly simple, and recommended using all the optional rules: "There just isn't enough to the game to make it worth trying without them." Barton concluded that Starship: Assault might be usable as a simple board wargame using the scenarios provided, but "As the first module in a role-playing system, though, it's hard to accept. In the science fiction role-playing game field, S:A just doesn’t stand out enough to make it worth the effort.

In Issue 27 of Simulacrum, Brian Train commented, "The counters are poorly drawn silhouettes that are hard to read. The map is [...] just a giant series of variegated and differently shaded hexagons that are supposed to represent a starship. Pretty awful work."

In a retrospective review in Issue 35 of Warning Order, Matt Irsik noted that the game had "Complex rules that led you to believe that this was supposed to be far more than a microgame. The game also was on the verge of the RPG craze at the time and it seemed as if it couldn't make up its mind if it was a role-playing or man to man combat wargame."
