= The Forest-Lords of Dihad =

1982 fantasy Role-playing game supplement

Cover art by V.W. Wyman

The Forest-Lords of Dihad is a licensed supplement published by Gamelords in 1982 for the fantasy role-playing game The Fantasy Trip (TFT) published by Metagaming Concepts.

== Contents ==
The Forest-Lords of Dihad is a supplement in which the heavily forested nation of Dihad is detailed, as are its repeated wars with neighboring Muipoco.

This campaign setting supplement details The Land Beyond the Mountains, a wooded wilderness region. It provides information on four counties, several villages, short adventure scenarios, encounters, and rules for hunting, trapping, and logging.

== Publication history ==
In 1977, Metagaming Concepts released Melee and Wizard, which together formed the ruleset for the fantasy role-playing game The Fantasy Trip. In 1982, Metagaming licensed Gamelords to produce material for TFT, and The Forest-Lords of Dihad was the first product, a 32-page book written by Richard Meyer, with cover art by V.M. Wyman, and interior art by Wallace Miller and Larry Shade.

Game historian Shannon Appelcline noted that by the early 1980s, Howard Thompson "was already looking to produce more group-oriented products for TFT. In 1982 he signed an agreement with RPG publisher Gamelords to create a campaign world for TFT. Metagaming soon published Gamelords's first two campaign books, The Forest-Lords of Dihad (1982) and The Warrior-Lords of Darok (1982). However Thompson terminated this agreement before any further work was done and two later books that were originally intended for TFT were instead published by Gamelords as supplements for their own Thieves' Guild game system."

== Reception ==
In Issue 20 of Abyss, Dave Nalle called this "a rather excellent role-playing material. It is of far higher quality and more mature in orientation than the standard TFT adventures from Metagaming. There are more opportunities for thought and role-playing and situations, and possibilities are not as mechanical as would be expected from the TFT tradition." Nalle did find one problem, noting that the burden fell to the gamemaster to fill in all the details of each adventure. Nalle concluded, "This is a great step forward for TFT, but it may not find the audience it deserves as it may be too unusual for FTF' GMs."

Anders Swenson reviewed The Warrior-Lords of Darok and The Forest-Lords of Dihad for Different Worlds magazine and stated that "these are two solid products which should find their way into the libraries of most TFT gamemasters, and many others who collect well-done scenarios."

Steve Woodcock reviewed The Forest-Lords of Dihad for Fantasy Gamer magazine and stated that "Forest Lords of Dihad is a great background for a TFT campaign. Highly recommended for all TFT FMs (if you can still find it)."
