= Duel (role-playing game) =

Combat-focused role-playing game

Duel is a combat-focused role-playing game published by Nightshift Games in 1992.

== Description ==
Duel, a game of tactical combat-oriented role-playing, is a 36-page 8.5" x 11" book written by Paul Arden Lidberg and Raymond Greer, with cover art by Phil Morrissey, and interior art by Morrissey, Margaret Schnepf Carspecken, and Marty Salzman. It was published by Nightshift Games in 1992. (Some sources say another company associated with Lidberg, Crunchy Frog Enterprises, was the publisher.)

In addition to the role-playing game rules, the book includes a four-page sample adventure.

In an interview, Lidberg said that Duel was meant to emulate Steve Jackson's out-of-print game The Fantasy Trip (TFT), designed while Jackson was at Metagaming; TFT itself was based on two of Jackson's earlier Metagaming MicroGames of tactical individual combat, Melee and Wizard.

== Gameplay ==
Duel uses only 5-sided dice and 10-sided dice to generate random results.

=== Character generation ===
Character have three abilities, Body, Agility, and Mind, that are each generated with a random roll of a 10-sided die. As the character progresses, abilities also increase. The scale is open-ended — there is no limit to each ability. Hit points, number of skills and skill level are generated from the ability scores.

Although the number and level of skills are dependednt on the basic ability scores, the actual skills themselves are not; they are purchased from a list using a point-buy system. Rules are provided for inventing skills that are not listed in the rulebook.

=== Magic ===
Magic is divided in five into five "Aspects":

- Fortification: The wizard can increase their own abilities.
- Alteration: The wizard can increase or decrease someone else's abilities.
- Vigor: The wizard can raise or lower the hit points of anyone, including themselves.
- Journey: The wizard can modify a movement rate.
- Enhancement: The wizard can affect the primary statistics of an object.

The amount by which a wizard can affect any of the above is defined by the wizard's Mind ability, and how many character generation points the player spent on the relevant magical Aspect during character generation.

Although examples of spells are given in the rules, it is up to each player to invent spells by using the Aspects. For instance, to make a magic shield, the wizard could use the Enhancement Aspect to increase the Body score of the air in front of the wizard.

=== Equipment ===
The rules provide the costs and game statistics for a variety of weapons. Although the game is medieval fantasy, firearms are listed in order to give the gamemaster the ability to move the game into a different era and genre.

== Expansion game ==
In 1992, Nightshift Games published an expanded version called Mega-Duel.

The adventure Secret Liason was published in 1993.

== Reception ==
Tony Lee reviewed DUEL in White Wolf #34 (Jan./Feb., 1993), rating it a 4 out of 5 and stated that "DUEL is balanced, creative, easy to absorb (all 36 pages of it), and highly recommended. It's every bit what the designers envisioned it to be: a simple yet very playable universal system. That (and the promised Worldbooks support) makes DUEL a terrific, inexpensive alternative to GURPS and other generic systems."

In the May 1993 edition of Dragon (Issue #193), Lester W. Smith called this book "a good-looking product". Smith was also "favorably impressed" by the unusual magic system, although he wondered if players would really use their imaginations to think up new spells. He praised the simple combat system as "presented very clearly and intuitively satisfying." However, Smith pointed out that since the weapons "are relatively bloodless", combat generally takes a long time. Smith summarized the game as "an engagingly written product with a number of creative but sensible innovations", but he did have reservations about the open-ended nature of the ability scores, pointing out that "characters can progress fairly rapidly to the point where they can easily pass pretty much any skill roll." Smith concluded that consumers should perhaps take a wait-and-see approach, saying, "I think the game is a good design that needs a bit more development and playtesting."
