= Treasure of the Silver Dragon =

1980 fantasy role-playing game

- Designers: Howard Thompson
- Publishers: Metagaming Concepts
- Publication: 1980
- Genres: Fantasy

Treasure of the Silver Dragon is a fantasy role-playing game adventure published by Metagaming Concepts in 1980, the fourth in the company's "MicroQuest Series" that used the rules system from The Fantasy Trip. The publisher promoted the game by hiding clues within the game that could lead to the location of a real $10,000 treasure, which was claimed six weeks after the game was released.

== Description ==
Treasure of the Silver Dragon is a programmed dungeon treasure hunt for 1–6 players that is set on an alternate Earth of magic called Dragonodonia. The ruler, the silver dragon Etherion, has been frozen in stasis by evil forces. The player characters are quested to find Etherion. To do so, they visit numbered map locations to uncover clues, facing random encounters with beasts, warriors, traders, slavers, and wizards.

The game requires copies of both Melee and Wizard to play.

== Publication history ==
In the mid-1970s, Metagaming Concepts enjoyed healthy sales of their MicroGame series. Most of these, such as OGRE, were small board wargames with a science fiction background. Metagaming moved into the fantasy realm in 1977 with the release of two MicroGames, Melee and Wizard, which were combined into a combat-oriented role-playing game titled The Fantasy Trip. In 1978, Metagaming launched a new MicroQuest line of games that used the Fantasy Trip rules. The fourth of these, Treasure of the Silver Dragon, published in 1980, offered clues within the game that could lead to the real-world location of a 31-ounce solid silver dragon with a silver value of about $4000 at that time. Whoever found the dragon would also win $10,000. A treasure ballot to be returned to the company was packaged in each game. If no one found the silver dragon by September 1, 1984, Metagaming would hold a draw for the unclaimed prize from the treasure ballots received.

The concept proved so successful that Metagaming released a sequel a year later, Treasure of Unicorn Gold, that also contained clues that would to lead to a hidden treasure and a prize of $10,000.

In his 2011 book Designers & Dragons, RPG historian Shannon Appelcline noted that "Two MicroQuests written by Howard Thompson – Treasure of the Silver Dragon (1980), MicroQuest #4 and Treasure of Unicorn Gold (1981), MicroQuest #6 – were very uniquely marketed. They were each linked to a treasure hunt. If readers figured out the clues in the books, they could discover a real-world treasure and receive a $10,000 check from Metagaming."

=== The quest for the silver dragon ===
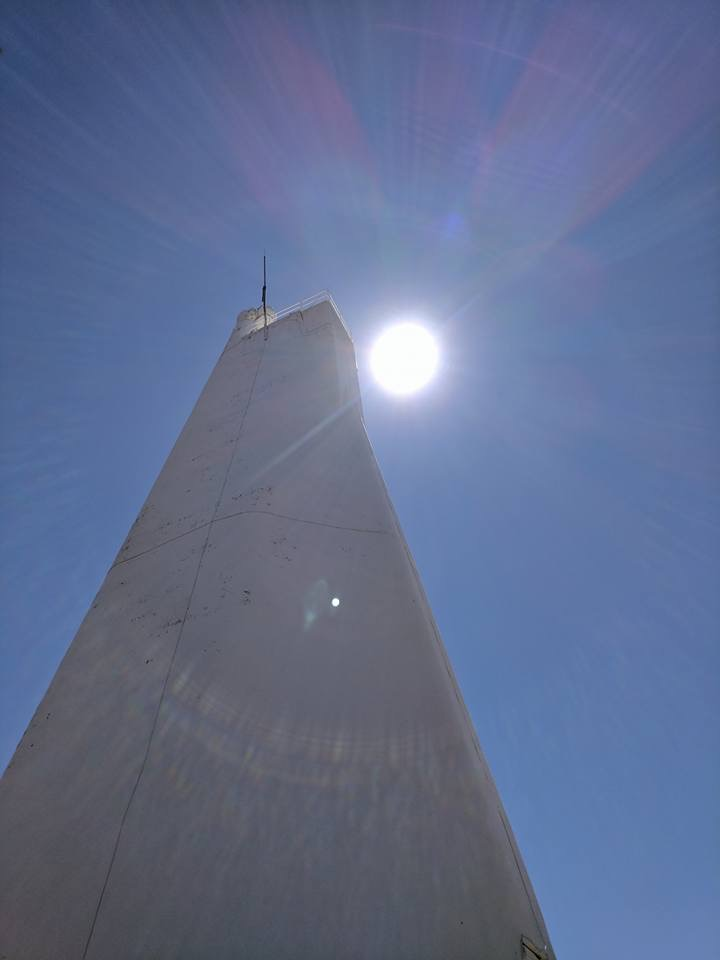
Tower of the Dunn Solar Telescope at Sunspot, New Mexico

Thomas Davidson, a Chemical Physics grad student at University of Texas, bought Treasure of the Silver Dragon as soon as it was released. After six weeks of playing the game and examining the clues, he realized that the sun played a recurring role in the game — the dragons use energy from the sun, there are repeated references to light, a sunburst logo shows up several times, and there is mention of a special white totem glistening in the rising sun.

Davidson became convinced that a solar observatory was key to the mystery. The nearest one was the Sunspot Solar Observatory at Sunspot, New Mexico. Davidson and his girlfriend took a bus there, and he was struck by how the main building housing the Richard B. Dunn Solar Telescope could be described as a white totem. Using clues from the game and the game map, they pinpointed an area 1.5 miles (2.4 km) from the observatory, where they found a stump with runes carved into, similar to one that had been described in the game. Finding a shallow depression nearby, they dug into the ground and uncovered a box containing a silver dragon completely encased in wax, as well as instructions on how to claim the $10,000 prize.

Howard Thompson, the founder of Metagaming and the designer of the game, was disappointed that it had only taken six weeks for the treasure to be found — he had hoped it would take a year or more, giving him time to advertise the contest and sell more copies of the game. Thompson resolved to make the treasure hunt in the sequel game much more difficult.

== Reception ==
In Vindicator, Duke Ritenhouse noted the game box "somehow managed to be both flimsy and inconvenient at the same time. Oh, and the artwork was nothing to get excited about, either."

In the August 1981 issue of Analog Science Fiction, Dana Lombardy was fascinated by the idea of a real-life treasure hunt, calling it, "an interesting fantasy adventure, a challenging puzzle, and a possible drawing for $10,000. In short, pretty good entertainment value for a $5 game."
