= Treasure of Unicorn Gold =

1981 fantasy role-playing game

- Designers: Howard Thompson
- Publishers: Metagaming Concepts
- Publication: 1981
- Genres: Fantasy

Treasure of Unicorn Gold is a fantasy role-playing game adventure published by Metagaming Concepts in 1981, the sixth in the company's "MicroQuest Series" that used the rules system from The Fantasy Trip. The publisher promoted the game by hiding clues within the game to the whereabouts of a real $10,000 treasure. However, the company went out of business shortly after the adventure was released, and the prize was never claimed.

== Description ==
Treasure of Unicorn Gold is a programmed dungeon treasure hunt for 1–6 players that is set in the same fantasy world as its prequel, Treasure of the Silver Dragon. The player characters are quested to uncover the fate of the imprisoned dragon Etherion, and visit numbered map locations to uncover clues, facing random encounters with beasts, warriors, traders, slavers, and Toltec wizards. A new game mechanic ensures that enemy groups match or exceed the party's size.

The game requires a copy of Melee and Wizard to play.

== Publication history ==
In the mid-1970s, Metagaming Concepts enjoyed healthy sales with their MicroGame series. Most of these, such as OGRE, were small board wargames with a science fiction background. However, Metagaming also touched on the fantasy theme through the Fantasy Trip ruleset for fantasy role-playing, published in 1977 as two MicroGames, Melee and Wizard. In 1978, staying with the fantasy setting, Metagaming launched a new MicroQuest line of games that used the Fantasy Trip rules. The fourth of these, Treasure of the Silver Dragon, published in 1980, offered clues within the game that could lead to the real-world location of a small silver dragon. Whoever found the dragon would win $10,000. Six weeks after the game was published, a graduate student named Thomas Davidson claimed the prize by finding the sterling silver dragon (itself worth $3000) near a solar observatory at Sunspot, New Mexico.

Metagaming used the same promotion the following year for the sequel to Treasure of the Silver Unicorn, the sixth game in the MicroQuest line titled Treasure of Unicorn Gold, written by Metagaming founder Howard Thompson and published by Metagaming as a digest-sized box containing a 44-page book, map, counters, and die. It too offered a prize of $10,000 for the player who found a miniature golden unicorn by following clues within the game. However, no one found the hidden unicorn before Metagaming went out of business in 1983.

In his 2011 book Designers & Dragons, RPG historian Shannon Appelcline noted that "Two MicroQuests written by Howard Thompson – Treasure of the Silver Dragon (1980), MicroQuest #3 and Treasure of Unicorn Gold (1981), MicroQuest #6 – were very uniquely marketed. They were each linked to a treasure hunt. If readers figured out the clues in the books, they could discover a real-world treasure and receive a $10,000 check from Metagaming. The Silver Dragon was found within six weeks but the Unicorn Gold was never discovered; as we will see Metagaming went out of business before the answer to the puzzle could be revealed." Appelcline concluded, "As for Howard Thompson, he originally promised to return to the field to produce computer games and in the meantime said he would pay the $10,000 reward for the 'Unicorn Gold' to a random entrant if the prize was not found by September 1, 1984. However by 1984, Thompson was no longer returning phone calls and has subsequently disappeared entirely."

== Reception ==
In the inaugural issue of Fantasy Gamer, Edwin J. Rotondaro noted that "The biggest problem with UG is that there are no real dangerous moments in the entire quest ... [Compared to its prequel, Silver Dragon] there are fewer numbered encounters in this quest, and far less treasure to be had. The map is easily crossed." Rotondaro thought this game was "a pretty tame follow-up quest" and concluded by giving it a rating of B− , saying, "It is not a bad adventure, it just does not present any real challenge for those who attempt it."

In Vindicator, Duke Ritenhouse noted the game box "somehow managed to be both flimsy and inconvenient at the same time. Oh, and the artwork was nothing to get excited about, either." Ritenhouse also called out the typesetting of the rules, noting, "Sometime in the first half of 1981, Metagaming decided to switch typesetting methods. The most charitable word to describe how the company’s subsequent releases looked would be 'unattractive.' A more accurate term would be 'awful' ... Treasure of Unicorn Gold was set with a headache-inducing sans serif typeface font from a printer that could only produce one size of type ... the combined effect is almost impossible to describe."

In the August 1981 issue of Analog Science Fiction, Dana Lombardy was fascinated by the idea of a real-life treasure hunt, and commented, "Treasure of Unicorn Gold is an interesting fantasy adventure, a challenging puzzle, and a possible drawing for $10,000. In short, pretty good entertainment value for a $5 game."
