= Advanced Wizard =

1980 role-playing game supplement

Advanced Wizard is a 1980 role-playing game supplement published by Metagaming Concepts for The Fantasy Trip.

== Contents ==
Advanced Wizard is a supplement in which comprehensive rules for using magic cover how spells are learned and cast, how new spells can be invented, and how magical items are created. It also features descriptions and effects for more than 100 individual spells.

== Publication history ==
Advanced Wizard was written by Steve Jackson and published by Metagaming Concepts in 1980 as a 40-page book.

Jackson intended for The Fantasy Trip to be published as a boxed set, but publisher Howard M. Thompson decided that the price was too high and so he split the game into four separate books: Advanced Melee (1980), which expanded the Melee system, Advanced Wizard (1980), In the Labyrinth (1980), and the adventure Tollenkar's Lair (1980).

== Reception ==
Steve Perrin reviewed Advanced Wizard for Different Worlds magazine and stated that "Like its partners, this is a well-done set of rules and well deserves purchase."
