= Death Test 2 =

Death Test 2 is a 1980 fantasy role-playing game adventure for The Fantasy Trip published by Metagaming Concepts. It was re-released by Steve Jackson Games in 2019.

== Plot summary ==
Death Test 2 is a programmed labyrinth adventure and a sequel to Death Test. Both adventures center on a test devised by the Thorz, the ruler of the city of Ardonirane, to test potential recruits for his army. The second labyrinth was built after the Thorz determined the original Death Test failed to weed out unworthy warriors. Characters that survive the labyrinth are allowed to enlist in the army of the Thorsz, with their rank assigned based on how many enemies the applicants overcome. It can be run as a solo scenario or with a game master. It is usable with The Fantasy Trip, or with both Melee and Wizard. With the revival of The Fantasy Trip in 2019, Steve Jackson Games released Ardonirane, a new supplement detailing the lands and customs of the Thorz, in 2020.

== Publication history ==
Death Test 2 was written by Steve Jackson, and was published by Metagaming Concepts in 1980 as a digest-sized box with a 48-page book and counters. It was the second MicroQuest and was published soon after the rules for The Fantasy Trip were published; the adventure would end up being Jackson's last publication for his original role-playing game.

Death Test 2 was re-released in a combined edition with Death Test in 2019 by Steve Jackson Games after Jackson re-acquired the copyright for the TFT products he authored for Metagaming.

== Reception ==
Ronald Pehr reviewed Death Test 2 in The Space Gamer No. 33. Pehr commented that "The problems are minor [...] compared to the hours of enjoyment Death Test 2 can provide. If you like TFT, you'll like Death Test 2."

== Reviews ==
- Pegasus #10 (Oct. 1982)
