= Orb Quest =

Role-playing game supplement

Orb Quest is a 1982 fantasy role-playing game adventure for The Fantasy Trip, published by Metagaming Concepts.

== Plot summary ==
Orb Quest is a microquest to be played either as a group or solitaire, a sequel to Death Test 2.

== Publication history ==
Orb Quest was one of the final publications for The Fantasy Trip, alongside two adventures published by Gamelords in 1982, The Forest-Lords of Dihad and The Warrior-Lords of Darok.

== Reception ==
Edwin J. Rotondaro reviewed Orb Quest in The Space Gamer No. 62. Rotondaro commented that "Overall, I have to give Orb Quest an A− rating. The problems are easily corrected, and the quest's difficulty should keep even experienced players on their toes."
