= Advanced Melee =

Advanced Melee is a 1980 role-playing game supplement published by Metagaming Concepts for The Fantasy Trip.

== Contents ==
Advanced Melee is a supplement in which a comprehensive set of combat rules addresses various tactical elements, including character movement, weapon usage, directional facing, ranged attacks, combat involving mounted units, and unique or exceptional scenarios.

== Publication history ==
Advanced Melee was written by Steve Jackson and published by Metagaming Concepts in 1980 as a 32-page book.

Jackson intended for The Fantasy Trip to be published as a boxed set, but publisher Howard M. Thompson decided that the price was too high and so he split the game into four separate books: Advanced Melee (1980), which expanded the Melee system, Advanced Wizard (1980), In the Labyrinth (1980), and the adventure Tollenkar's Lair (1980).

== Reception ==
Steve Perrin reviewed Advanced Melee for Different Worlds and stated that "All in all, Advanced Melee is well worth the money. Don't pay any attention to the publisher's attempt to get you to buy the Microgame, Melee is dead, long live Advanced Melee!"
