= GURPS Fantasy Folk =

1990 supplement for the GURPS role-playing game

Fantastic races for fantasy roleplaying
- Cover by Ken Kelly
- Designers: Chris W. McCubbin
- Publishers: Steve Jackson Games
- Publication: 1990; 36 years ago
- Genres: Fantasy
- Systems: GURPS

GURPS Fantasy Folk is a fantasy sourcebook for the GURPS (Generic Universal Role-Playing System), written by Chris W. McCubbin, and published by Steve Jackson Games in 1990.

== Contents ==
GURPS Fantasy Folk contains information about 24 nonhuman races that can either be used by the gamemaster to create non-player characters or by the players as player characters. The book is divided into two sections, extensive rules on how to design new creatures, and or each of the 24 races, a four-page description of their physiology, psychology, ecology, culture and politics

== Publication history ==
GURPS Fantasy Folk is a 128-page perfect-bound book that was written by Chris W. McCubbin, with Loyd Blankenship and Steve Jackson, with a cover by Ken Kelly, and illustrations by Evan Dorkin, and was published by Steve Jackson Games in 1990 as a 128-page book.

In 1995, the book was updated to GURPS third edition rules, written by Chris W. McCubbin and Sean Punch, with extra material by Lloyd Blankenship and Steve Jackson, illustrations by Shea Ryan and Dan Smith, and cover art by Ken Kelley.

== Reception ==
In the December 1990 of Dragon (Issue #164), Jim Bambra had mixed feelings about this book. Although he liked the cover art by Ken Kelley, calling it "exceptionally good", he felt the interior art was "only average at best." Although he thought the creature descriptions "provide good insights into each of the races," he felt the descriptions "suffer from being designed for a generic setting. Instead of getting creatures who are integral parts of their fantasy world, we get creatures who can be plugged into almost any world, which gives them a fairly bland flavor." Bambra concluded that "GURPS game players looking for nifty creature design rules will not be disappointed... For those looking for detailed descriptions of how these creatures interact with a given world or setting, GURPS Fantasy Folk is far too generic to offer more than just a brief glimpse."

In the February 1996 edition of Dragon (Issue #226), Rick Swan felt that the second edition of this book "promises more than it delivers", pointing out that the "rigid format" of four pages per race left him feeling that "the writing feels cramped, suffering from an abundance of generalities and a shortage of specifics." However, Swan called the race generation rules "one of the most elegant systems for creating original characters I've ever seen." He concluded by giving the book an average rating of 3 out of 6, saying "If you're a GURPS fanatic too lazy to cook up your own statistics for dwarves and kobolds, Fantasy Folk might be worth the investment. If you own the first edition, you can probably skip the upgrade. If you're not a GURPS player, there's little of interest here. Still, even if you decide to pass, I'd sneak a peek at the chapter on race generation — it's pretty terrific."

In his 1991 book Heroic Worlds, Lawrence Schick felt that "the 'independently focusable eyes' feature shows a definite Spawn of Fashan influence", and that the book includes "a few unusual choices for player characters, such as winged folk, insect men, gargoyles, ghouls, and 'exalted horses.'

== Reviews ==
- GamesMaster International (Issue 4 - Nov 1990)

== See also ==
- List of GURPS publications
