= GURPS Space =

Role-playing game supplement

- Fourth edition cover
- Designers: Steve Jackson, William A. Barton, David Pulver
- Publishers: Steve Jackson Games
- Publication: 1986 first edition; 1990 second edition; 1999 third edition; 2006 fourth edition
- Genres: Science fiction
- Systems: GURPS

GURPS Space is a sourcebook published by Steve Jackson Games for use with GURPS (Generic Universal Role-Playing System), published in four editions from 1988 to 2006.

== Description ==
GURPS Space is a toolkit that enables gamemasters to create science fiction role-playing campaigns using the GURPS rules. Guidelines are provided for designing games using science fantasy, space opera, or hard science fiction genres, by creating worlds, planets and alien races.

=== First edition ===
GURPS Space was one of the broad genre books that was published after the 1986 GURPS Basic Set. GURPS Space was designed by Steve Jackson and William Barton, and published by Steve Jackson Games as a 128-page book. The book features additional material by W. G. Armintrout, Stephen Beeman, Ben Ellinger, John M. Ford, Don Gallagher, J. David George, Mike Hurst, David Ladyman, and Mike Moe, with a cover illustration by Michael Goodwin. The book contains suggestions on campaign design, races, political systems, and military and civilian organizations. There are sections on space ship design, character creation, new rules for jobs and wealth, alien races, gadgets, weapons, medicine, and environments.

This first-tier genre book is supported by several second-tier sourcebooks that helped expand the GURPS Space universe, including four space atlases, GURPS Space Unnight (1988), GURPS Space Bestiary (1990) and GURPS Aliens (1990).

=== Second edition ===
Following the release of a third edition of GURPS, a second edition of GURPS Space was published in 1990 to conform with the new ruleset.

=== Third edition ===
The third edition includes a reprint of some of the GURPS Vehicles rules and some high-tech weaponry.

=== Fourth edition ===
The fourth edition of GURPS Space was released in 2006, and covered the creation of star systems, worlds and alien races, either completely randomly or with any amount of gamemaster intervention during the process. Advice is also provided on planning campaigns and other related material.

Coverage of spacecraft is aimed at setting level issues such as choosing the technology used by spacecraft in the game. This section does not worry about game mechanics issues, but rather helps players and gamemasters determine the broad capabilities of the vessel in question.

== Reception ==
In the January 1989 edition of Dragon (Issue #141), Jim Bambra commented, "Even if you never intend to play the GURPS game, the GURPS Space game is worth picking up on the basis of its ideas alone. For GMs who enjoy designing unique backgrounds for their players, and for GURPS players everywhere, this book is well worth getting."

In the January 1989 edition of Games International (Issue 2), James Wallis was impressed by the breadth of coverage, noting that this book "covers everything from planetary system design [...] to lists of equipment." Wallis felt that the only significant item missing was robots. He concluded by giving this a perfect rating of 5 out of 5, saying, "GURPS Space is ideal for any referee who isn't satisfied with existing SF systems and wants to design their own or to convert a favourite book into a rolegaming environment [...] Every SF referee should have one."

In Issue 43 of Abyss, Dave Nalle commented, "aside from a few predictable flaws, it is one of the better GURPS supplements to date." Nalle noted, "There is lots of good material in Space, but some areas are covered a bit too briefly and the chapters are clearly organized in the wrong order, perhaps a symptom of hasty editing." Nalle also remarked on the lack of a scenario that was usual in other GURPS books. He concluded, "it does a good job of presenting the raw materials you need to design your own campaign with GURPS or with any basic role-playing mechanics. Give it a try."

== Awards ==
At the 1989 Origins Awards, the first edition of GURPS Space won Best Roleplaying Supplement of 1988.

== Other reviews ==
- Games Review Vol. 2, #9 (review of second edition)

== See also ==
- GURPS Space Atlas
- GURPS Space Atlas 4
- List of GURPS publications
