= Dragons (book) =

1980 book

First edition

Dragons is a punch out book published by Random House in 1980.

== Contents ==
Dragons is a book containing a collection of six whimsical punch-out figures of fold-up creatures on light cardstock.

== Reception ==
Steve Jackson reviewed Dragons in The Space Gamer No. 44. Jackson commented that "Dragons is a cute novelty gift for a precocious young (or older but young-at-heart) fantasy gamer. Dragons are nice in their own right, even if you can't put them on the board for Grod the Barbarian to slaughter."
