= GURPS Powers =

Tabletop role-playing game supplement

- Designers: Sean Punch
- Publishers: Steve Jackson Games
- Publication: 2005; 21 years ago
- Genres: Multiple
- Systems: GURPS fourth edition

GURPS Powers is a role-playing character book written by Sean Punch (with vignettes and additional writing by Phil Masters) and released in December 2005 for the fourth edition of GURPS.

== Contents ==
GURPS Powers is a rule book that extends the basic character creation rules presented in the basic set to better handle high powered characters, and allow highly detailed customization of powers.

The book aims to be genre independent and covers rules for characters from fantasy and myth to supers and science fiction with no bias towards any one.

The first section provides the framework and rules with which a player and Game Master construct a Power. Next is a large section devoted to many worked examples to use straight away, and also provide a guide to work from when creating your own powers. Lastly, there are chapters focusing running high powered games, and notes on various genres exist to help players and GMs integrate powers into their games.

=== What is a Power? ===
A Power is – like Psionics as presented in the Basic Set – a range of abilities (i.e., Advantages) and a Talent organized in a logical grouping. In addition, Powers have a Source and Focus that add color and help to tie together the abilities. Lastly there is an additional Power Modifier that acts like an Enhancement (rare) or Limitation to the power as a whole rather than individual abilities.

The source and focus of a power are significant. They take the generic abilities that are available, and tie them together in more unique ways. This approach may be familiar to players of the Hero System

== Publication history ==
GURPS Powers was published in 2005, one of several genre books published by Steve Jackson Games for the fourth edition.

Powers is the fourth edition replacement for GURPS Supers and GURPS Psionics from earlier editions of the game.

== See also ==
- List of GURPS books
