= Character Role Playing =

1981 fantasy role-playing game supplement

Character Role Playing is a 1981 fantasy role-playing game supplement published by Ragnarok Enterprises.

== Contents ==
Character Role Playing is a play aid that provides information on how to role play fantasy characters creatively.

== Reception ==
Ronald Pehr reviewed Character Role Playing in The Space Gamer No. 49. Pehr commented that "Experienced role players don't need Character Role Playing, others won't buy it. Get it for new FRPG players (who don't yet worship the dice), if you can convince them to read and heed."

Bill Pixley reviewed Mini-System 2 Character Role Playing for Pegasus magazine and stated that "I think that because of the basic information on how to truly roleplay that this booklet should be required reading for all those who are new to role-playing, and that those who are not new to fantasy roleplaying should also read it for the very useful personality creation information that it contains. "
