= Fantasy Masters' Codex =

Fantasy Masters' Codex is a 1981 fantasy role-playing game supplement for The Fantasy Trip published by Metagaming Concepts.

== Contents ==
Fantasy Masters' Codex is a supplement which indexes all material published for The Fantasy Trip up through 1980, as well as lists of the talents, spells, magic items, potions and equipment featuring several sorting methods, tables for DX adjustment and saving throws, and also listings of jobs, races and monsters.

== Reception ==
William A. Barton reviewed Fantasy Masters' Codex in The Space Gamer No. 41. Barton commented that "While the index to TFT is quite useful (and should have been released separately at a lower price), what Metagaming seems to have done with The Fantasy Masters' Codex 1981 is too little for too much."
