= Interplay (magazine) =

Gaming magazine

Interplay is a gaming magazine that was published from 1981 to 1982 by Metagaming Concepts.

== Contents ==
Interplay was a magazine focusing entirely on Metagaming products, particularly The Fantasy Trip.

== Publication history ==
Metagaming Concepts had sold off The Space Gamer, and they later turned to publishing a new magazine called Interplay: The Metagamer Diaries #1 (May/June 1981). Per Shannon Appelcline, "Unfortunately, it wasn't up to Metagaming's previous standards. The magazine's black & white covers were a clear step down from the glossy full-color covers of The Space Gamer. Its interior also looked a lot more like the fannish magazines then being produced by Judges Guild than Interplay's more distinguished predecessor." The company began having financial difficulties, and in Interplay #8 (September/October 1982), Howard Thompson touted the most successful series of games from Metagaming and promised that new products were soon to be released, although these were never actually published. Thompson soon left the game industry, but before that Genesis Gaming Products purchased Interplay in addition to Dwarfstar Games (1981–1982) from Heritage USA.

== Reception ==
W. G. Armintrout reviewed the first issue of Interplay in The Space Gamer No. 41. Armintrout commented that "If you can't live without Metagaming designer notes and errata, then you'll have to have Interplay. For TFT material, it seems to me that you should buy the annual supplement instead. I found the first issue to be useful (though not well-written or well-edited)."
