= Mission Escape! =

1980 video game

- Publisher: CE Software
- Designer: Jim Jacobson
- Platform: Apple II
- Release: 1980

Mission Escape! is an Apple II video game programmed by Jim Jacobson, and published by CE Software in 1980.

== Gameplay ==
Mission Escape! is a science fiction game in which the player fights through a series of progressively deadlier rooms, while being attacked by troopers, drones, and robots armed with missiles. The player moves through the station using up to three commands each turn, armed with lasers and missiles.

== Reception ==
Steve Jackson reviewed Mission Escape! in The Space Gamer No. 44. Jackson commented that "on the whole, it's a great way to kill an evening. Recommended for Apple owners who like reflex-testing games."

Graham Masters Jr. reviewed the game for Computer Gaming World, and stated that "Mission Escape is one of a handful of games to combine arcade features with what is in reality a strategy game."
