= GURPS Space Atlas =

Supplement for the roleplaying game GURPS published by Steve Jackson Games

Adventures on the fringes of the galaxy
- Cover art by Alan Gutierrez
- Designers: Steve Jackson; William A. Barton
- Publishers: Steve Jackson Games
- Publication: 1988; 38 years ago
- Genres: Science fiction
- Systems: GURPS

GURPS Space Atlas is a supplement published by Steve Jackson Games in 1988 for the science fiction role-playing game GURPS Space, which uses the rules of GURPS (Generic Universal Role-Playing System).

== Publication history ==
GURPS Space Atlas, the first in a series of supplements of planets and planetary systems published by Steve Jackson Games for use with GURPS Space campaigns. It was designed by Steve Jackson and William A. Barton, with cover art by Alan Gutierrez. It contains details of 28 star system in the Old Frontiers sector of the GURPS universe, as well as two or three adventure ideas for each system.

In the 2014 book Designers & Dragons: The '80s, game historian Shannon Appelcline noted that the "GURPS Space Atlases (1988–1991), GURPS Space Bestiary (1990) and GURPS Aliens (1990) helped fill out the GURPS Space world."

== Reception ==
In the January 1989 edition of Games International (Issue 2), James Wallis noted that "The diversity of planets is wide, although only two systems contain their own sentient life forms." He concluded by giving this book an above-average rating of 4 out of 5, saying, "This is a useful addition for the referee who likes to base adventures on other people's groundwork, or lacks the imagination to create their own systems."

== See also ==
- GURPS Space Atlas 4
- List of GURPS publications
