= The Corsairs of Cythera =

Tabletop role-playing game supplement

The Corsairs of Cythera is a 1981 fantasy role-playing game adventure published by Ragnarok Enterprises.

== Contents ==
The Corsairs of Cythera is an adventure in which the Achajaian fleet plans to attack Carzal, capital of the empire of Ilchania, and the Corsairs of Cythera have only twelve days to intervene and save the empire from this attack.

== Reception ==
Ronald Pehr reviewed The Corsairs of Cythera in The Space Gamer No. 49. Pehr commented that "The Corsairs of Cythera costs less than half as much as most fantasy game supplements, and lacks the detail and complexity of the better ones. But it does provide and exciting, entertaining adventure. If the referee doesn't mind putting up with its flaws, the players will be satisfied."

Bill Pixley reviewed Wyrdworld The Corsairs of Cythera for Pegasus magazine and stated that "All in all, The Corsairs of Cythera is a very interesting little adventure for 4th to 9th level characters and is well worth its [...] price."
