= GURPS Space Unnight =

1988 supplement for the GURPS role-playing game

Adventuring in the lost colony
- Cover art by Bob Eggleton
- Designers: Stefan Jones
- Publishers: Steve Jackson Games
- Publication: 1988; 38 years ago
- Genres: Science fiction
- Systems: GURPS

GURPS Space Unnight is a science fiction sourcebook for the GURPS (Generic Universal Role-Playing System), written by Stefan Jones, and published by Steve Jackson Games in 1988. It is designed to be used with GURPS Space.

== Contents ==
GURPS Space Unnight is a planetary setting for GURPS Space in which gamemasters can set science fiction genre adventures. In the pre-story to Unnight, humans from Earth travelled on faster than light ships to settle another star system. However, their ships missed the targeted system and ended up at a planet deep within a nebula. In the years that followed, without further contact from Earth, the settlers' technology gradually expired, and the planetary society broke down into feudal states. Unnight describes the social system and the geography of the planet. An adventure is included in the book.

== Publication history ==
GURPS (Generic Universal Role-Playing System), a generic system of role-playing rules for any setting, was published by Steve Jackson Games in 1986. Several genre-specific "flavors" for GURPS quickly followed, including GURPS Fantasy, GURPS Horror, and GURPS Space. Stefan Jones created GURPS Space Unnight as a planetary setting for GURPS Space, and it was published as a 48-page softcover book in 1988 with cover art by Bob Eggleton and illustrations by Terry Tidwell.

== Reception ==
In issue two of the UK magazine Games International, James Wallis was unimpressed by Unnight, pointing out that a feudal society without technology is just a magic-poor fantasy setting, commenting, "We might as well be in GURPS Fantasy." Wallis also found the entire book seemed to be a rush job, saying, "This is not a lovingly constructed fantasy culture: it is a project cobbled together by a writer facing deadline doom. The standard of editing and layout reflects this: most page references are incorrect and the sidebars suddenly start appearing in the centre instead of the outside edge halfway through the book." Wallis concluded by giving this book a below-average rating of only 2 stars out of 5, saying, "As a place for characters from the GURPS Space background to visit, Unnight just about stands up, although it is too gimmicky for my tastes and the adventure that comes with it is uninspired. As a background for native adventures, it is unimaginative and lacking in potential. As a project, it could have done with an extra 36 pages, a thorough reworking and another six months' work."

== Awards ==
At the 1989 Origins Awards, GURPS Space Unnight was a finalist in the category "Best Adventure of 1988".

== See also ==
- List of GURPS publications
