= GURPS Aliens =

1990 supplement for the GURPS role-playing game

Nonhuman races for science fiction roleplaying
- Cover by Michael Whelan
- Designers: Chris W. McCubbin
- Publishers: Steve Jackson Games
- Publication: 1990; 36 years ago
- Genres: Horror; science fiction; superhero
- Systems: GURPS

GURPS Aliens is a horror, science fiction and superhero sourcebook for the GURPS (Generic Universal Role-Playing System), written by Chris W. McCubbin, and published by Steve Jackson Games in 1990.

== Contents ==
GURPS Aliens is a complete sourcebook on extraterrestrials, intended for use with GURPS Space, GURPS Horror, or GURPS Supers. It describes 28 alien races, including the An Phar, "pig-like humanoids with a love of philosophy," the Banduch, "super-powerful psychic dinosaurs," and the Verms: "Their ambition is to eat the galaxy."

== Publication history ==
GURPS Aliens was written by Chris W. McCubbin with W.G. Armintrout, William A. Barton, Steve Jackson, Creede Lambard, and Sharleen Lambard, with a cover by Michael Whelan, and was published by Steve Jackson Games in 1990 as a 128-page book. GURPS Aliens requires the GURPS Basic Set to use. GURPS Aliens was one of several sourcebooks published to add to the background of the GURPS Space setting.

== Reception ==
David L. Pulver reviewed GURPS Aliens for Challenge #49. Pulver comments in his conclusion: "GURPS Aliens' imaginative array of extraterrestrial races coupled with its lucid organization makes it a pleasure to read and to use. I have no hesitation in giving it a whole-hearted recommendation, not only as an invaluable sourcebook for GURPS, but as a useful source of ideas for any science-fiction RPG."

== See also ==
- List of GURPS publications
