= GURPS Space Atlas 4 =

Supplement for the roleplaying game GURPS published by Steve Jackson Games

Adventures on the fringes of the galaxy
- Cover art by Alan Gutierrez
- Designers: David Pulver; Stephen Dedman
- Publishers: Steve Jackson Games
- Publication: 1991; 35 years ago
- Genres: Science fiction
- Systems: GURPS

GURPS Space Atlas 4 is a science fiction supplement written by David Pulver and Stephen Dedman published by Steve Jackson Games in 1991 for GURPS Space.

== Publication history ==
GURPS Space Atlas 4 is the fourth supplement of planets and planetary systems for use with GURPS Space campaigns. It was written by David Pulver and Stephen Dedman, with illustrations by David Midgette, and cover art by Alan Gutierrez.

In the 2014 book Designers & Dragons: The '80s, game historian Shannon Appelcline noted that the "GURPS Space Atlases (1988–1991), GURPS Space Bestiary (1990) and GURPS Aliens (1990) helped fill out the GURPS Space world."

== Reception ==
In the February 1993 edition of Dragon (Issue #190), Rick Swan called the book "an invaluable reference not only for GURPS Space enthusiasts, but for science fiction gamers of all persuasions." Swan concluded by giving the book an excellent rating of 4.5 stars out of 5, saying, "the quality of writing, effective graphics, and diversity of the entries distinguishes Space Atlas 4 from its run-of-the-mill competition."

== See also ==
- GURPS Space Atlas - number 1
- List of GURPS publications
