= GURPS Compendium I: Character Creation =

1996 supplement for the GURPS role-playing game

- Publishers: Steve Jackson Games
- Publication: 1996; 30 years ago
- Genres: Universal
- Systems: GURPS third edition

GURPS Compendium I: Character Creation is a rules supplement for the GURPS (Generic Universal Role-Playing System), and published by Steve Jackson Games in 1996.

== Contents ==
GURPS Compendium I: Character Creation is a supplement in which all character creation rules for GURPS are consolidated into a single 192-page volume. Built to supplement the third edition GURPS Basic Set, it pulls material from across numerous GURPS supplements, Steve Jackson Games house rules, and contributions from Pyramid and Roleplayer magazines. Using the points-based generation system of GURPS, the compendium walks players through stat and skill assignments, including options for specialization, languages, gadgeteering, and general-purpose skills that apply across gameworlds. It also covers maneuvers and non-human character generation, providing structural support to the extensive sections on advantages and disadvantages. The book catalogues every trait from previously published worldbooks, grouped by type—such as Mundane, Occult & Supernatural, and Racial & Super—while using wit with traits like 'Fashion Sense' or 'No Hangover,' and flaws like 'Evil Twin' or 'Weirdness Magnet.' Enhancements and limitations allow players to tweak traits for more nuanced character builds. The appendices offer an indexed replacement for the Basic Set's lists.

== Publication history ==
GURPS Compendium I: Character Creation is the first part of a two-volume set.

== Reception ==
Jim Swallow reviewed GURPS Compendium I: Character Creation for Arcane magazine, rating it a 6 out of 10 overall, and stated that "You can't really say much about a volume like this - it's a rulebook full of rules with no system to lend it narrative colour, so naturally it's a bit like a textbook, but it's designed to be a reference guide and in that aspect it gets full marks. With this and the Basic Rules, ref and players have all they'll ever need to make characters from any world, anywhere; Compendium II: Combat and Campaigns, due out in November, will fill in the rest of the background blanks. The only things you don't get here are world-specific material, such as psionics, cybernetics or magic lists. Full-time GURPS campaigners playing across myriad gameworlds will find this book invaluable, but those playing in just one or two backgrounds should check it out before buying - it might be more than you need."

== Reviews ==
- Fractal Spectrum (Issue 13 - Fall 1996)
- AAB Proceedings (Issue 40)

== See also ==
- List of GURPS publications
- GURPS Compendium II: Combat and Campaigns, companion compendium
