= GURPS Basic Set =

Tabletop role-playing game publication

- Designers: Steve Jackson; Sean M. Punch; David L. Pulver
- Publishers: Steve Jackson Games
- Publication: 1986 (first edition); 1987 (second edition); 1988 (third edition); 2004 (fourth edition)
- Genres: Universal
- Systems: GURPS fourth Edition

GURPS Basic Set is a role playing game publication written by Steve Jackson, Sean M. Punch, and David L. Pulver. The first edition GURPS Basic Set box was published in 1986, a standalone third edition book in 1988, and a hardcover, two-volume fourth edition in 2004.

== Contents ==
=== First and second editions ===
GURPS stands for Generic Universal Role-Playing System – that is essentially a very flexible descendant of The Fantasy Trip. Basic combat is simple, but advance combat is very position-oriented, almost a complicated boardgame. The level of complexity used is up to the players. The character improvement system is skill-based. The many additional supplements to the Basic Set enable GURPS characters to move easily from one gaming genre to another.

The Basic Set includes a "Characters" book (72 pages, covers character creation and development, skills, and basic equipment), "Adventuring" (80 pages, covers success rolls, combat, damage, running the game, game and campaign backgrounds, and animals), a 24-page book of charts and tables, and a 32-page book of two introductory scenarios, one a solo.

The GURPS Basic Set used the same combat rules previously published in Man to Man, and magic rules were not included but later released in GURPS Fantasy (1986).

=== Third edition ===
The third edition GURPS Basic Set, released in 1988, combined all the books from the previous sets into one volume.

The third edition revised GURPS Basic Set replaced the adventure with an appendix covering rules added in supplements between 1988 and 1994 that were generic in application. It was stated that "If you have an old Third Edition, and the new Compendium, you'll have it all." Reviewers of the time called it GURPS 3.5 edition while Steve Jackson Game calls all their own non fourth edition GURPS material still in print "GURPS Classic".

GURPS Characters cover

=== Fourth edition ===
The GURPS Basic Set for the fourth edition of GURPS was published in 2004 by Steve Jackson Games and contains the core rules for the fourth edition of GURPS. The first volume, Characters, addresses what players need to know to create a character and play the game. Eight sample characters are included. The second volume is titled Campaigns, and addresses the information a GM needs to build a world. All the basic information needed to run a campaign is here with genre or world-specific information in other books.

The previous edition of the GURPS rules consisted of a Basic Set as the core rule book, with GURPS Compendium I: Character Creation and GURPS Compendium II: Combat and Campaigns released later to collate alternative and advanced rules in a logical place. Many source books published after the release of the compendiums required them for play. The fourth edition basic set shifts the majority of that material into the core rule books.

In a move from previous editions, the books are hardbound and in color, a trend which has been followed in successive GURPS fourth edition books, with mixed reactions from players.

GURPS Update. To facilitate the transition from third to fourth edition, a free PDF was released. It includes a quick guide to change.

== Publication history ==
The first edition GURPS Basic Set was written by Steve Jackson with Creede Lambard and Sharleen Lambard, with a cover by Denis Loubet, and was published by Steve Jackson Games in 1986 as a boxed set containing four books (80, 72, 32, and 24 pages), sample character record sheets, and cardstock miniatures. The GURPS Basic Set boxed set made its debut at Origins in 1986. Steve Jackson Games published numerous supplements to support the game after the publication of the GURPS Basic Set.

The second edition revised GURPS Basic Set was published in 1987. The third edition GURPS Basic Set featured a cover by Michael Presley, and was published in 1988 as a 256-page book with a 16-page adventure (Caravan from Ein Arris). In 1994 the Basic Set third edition revised was printed with an appendix replacing the adventure with various new rules.

== Reception ==
The first edition of the GURPS Basic Set was reviewed by Marcus L. Rowland in issue 83 of White Dwarf magazine (November 1986). Rowland comments: "While I can applaud the idea behind the system, I can't really recommend GURPS at its present stage of development. In the long run, GURPS and all its supplements may cover more ground than other systems, possibly at less expense, but in the short term there isn't enough support material to run a fully rounded game of any type, apart from gladitorial combat and medieval adventures."

Michael DeWolfe reviewed GURPS Basic Set in Space Gamer/Fantasy Gamer No. 79. DeWolfe commented that "GURPS is a good roleplaying system. It combines old ideas with new and surpasses its contemporaries. Playability is paramount, though reality is sacrificed. Its ambitious goal of covering all game worlds looks to be accomplishable."

J. Michael Caparula reviewed GURPS Basic Set for Different Worlds magazine and stated that "The system is well-integrated and balanced, but I doubt that it is complete. It is my guess that future supplements will enhance and modify it further, just like any other role-playing game. It is good, however, that something like GURPS now exists, so that designers may concentrate on well-developed settings, characters, and situations instead of laboring over the intricasies of a new game system."

Ken Cliffe reviewed the second edition version of the GURPS Basic Set in White Wolf #13 (December 1988), rating it a 4 out of 5 and stated that "GURPS is definitely worth a look. This is especially so if you're tired of learning a new game system for each campaign. However, if you enjoy collecting games and prefer to be inspired by self-contained and extensive RPGs."

Michael DeWolfe reviewed the third edition of the GURPS Basic Set in Space Gamer/Fantasy Gamer #85. DeWolfe comments in his summary: "This game has looked at its peers and built on all of them; avoiding their mistakes and following their successes. If you're looking for a good point generation system, get GURPS. If you're looking for a truly generic system, get GURPS. If you're looking for a painstakingly coherent system, get GURPS. If you want a fine RPG, get this game. It is worth it."

Jim Bambra reviewed the third edition of the GURPS Basic Set for Dragon magazine #149 (September 1989). Bambra comments: "Now in its third incarnation, the GURPS Basic Set is better than ever. [...] It's a game designed to be used with an unlimited variety of backgrounds and settings; to its credit, the GURPS game does so admirably."

GURPS Basic Set, third edition was awarded the Origins Award for "Best Roleplaying Rules of 1988".

The third edition of GURPS Basic Set was an Origins and Gamers' Choice award-winner.

=== Awards and nominations ===
- In 2004 the fourth edition GURPS Basic set won the "Pen & Paper Fan Award" as Best RPG and was an inductee in its RPG Hall of Fame.
- It was a nominee at the 2005 Origins Award for Best Role-playing Game.

== See also ==
- List of GURPS books
- GURPS Infinite Worlds – a 36-page introduction to this setting is provided in Campaigns.
