= Steve Jackson's Man to Man =

Role-playing game sorucebook

- Cover for Man To Man
- Publishers: Steve Jackson Games
- Publication: 1985 (1e)
- Systems: GURPS

Steve Jackson's Man to Man is a sourcebook for GURPS.

== Contents ==
Man to Man is a subset of just the GURPS combat system for fantasy settings, including both basic rules and advanced rules, and comes with an introductory adventure scenario. Similarly to Steve Jackson's role-paying game The Fantasy Trip, Man to Man involves tactical combat on a hex grid, with a point-based system for character generation, and only uses six sided dice.

== Publication history ==
Man to Man: Fantasy Combat from GURPS was written by Steve Jackson, and published as an 80-page book with cardstock miniatures by Steve Jackson Games in 1985.

As the GURPS system was still being developed at the time, Steve Jackson Games released only the combat system to meet the deadline for the 1985 Origins Game Fair, as Man to Man: Fantasy Combat from GURPS. Man to Man also had a supplement called Orcslayer (1985). The original GURPS Basic Set (1986) then used the combat rules from Man to Man.

== Reception ==
Dale L. Kemper reviewed Man to Man for Different Worlds magazine and stated that "With the large replay value and fun factor of this authentic combat system, I think that any fantasy role-player would welcome it as an addition or replacement to his or her already existing combat rules in his/her favorite fantasy role-playing game."

== Reviews ==
- Abyss #37
- Asimov's Science Fiction v10 n3 (1986 03)
- Breakout
