= The Fantasy Trip Character Record Sheets =

Role-playing supplement

The Fantasy Trip Character Record Sheets is a 1982 role-playing game supplement published by Fantasimulations Associates.

== Contents ==
The Fantasy Trip Character Record Sheets is a set of character sheets for The Fantasy Trip.

== Reception ==
William A. Barton reviewed The Fantasy Trip Character Record Sheets in The Space Gamer No. 58. Barton commented that "Of course, one does not need elaborate record sheets to record characters for TFT. Simple index cards will do. If you prefer to use such sheets, though, you should find these quite useful."
