= Godsfire =

1976 board wargame published by Metagaming Concepts

- Designers: Lynn Willis
- Publishers: Metagaming Concepts 1976; Task Force Games 1985
- Publication: 1976; 49 years ago
- Genres: Science fiction board wargame

Godsfire is a science fiction board wargame published by Metagaming Concepts in 1976 that simulates planetary empire building, economics, and diplomacy. The game was reissued by Task Force Games in 1985.

== Description ==
Godsfire is set in the open star cluster Narym, which contains 15 planetary systems. It is a game for up to 15 players according to the rules, although the Metagaming version only has enough counters for eight players and the Task Force Games version only enough for four players. Like Stellar Conquest, players start with one or more planets, and try to conquer other planets. In addition to space- and land-based combat, players must also manage the political situation on their planets. Each planet contains four states that are bitter rivals. Doling out manufacturing to one state without spending similar amounts in the other three might result in a revolt that will cut the player's tax revenues, and thus the ability to manufacture goods. In addition, each state can be ruled by one of three types of government, and which type is in power will define what goods are manufactured. During peacetime, players can use their embassies on other players' planets to encourage revolt and a change in government, possibly throwing another player's plans off due to lack of the proper type of goods manufactured.

=== Components ===
The Metagaming Concepts edition includes:

- Two-piece map
- booklet of 15 system sheets
- six National Government sheets
- player reference card
- 960 die-cut counters (eight colors of 120 counters each)
- 616 paper Gigabuck money chits
- rulebook
- two 6-sided dice

The Task Force Games edition cut the number of counters to 432 (four colors of 108 each), although another 432 counters in four additional colors could be mail-ordered.

=== Setup ===
The three-dimensional map has over 2000 empty spaces and only 15 planetary systems. An equal number of systems are handed out to every player. Any left over systems become neutral.

=== Gameplay ===
There are two levels of play:

- Basic: Just the military game
- Advanced: Taxation, loans, economics, political parties, revolts, subversion, elections, inflation, and diplomacy are added

Winning the game balances military victories with economic benefits at home, so players must decide on balancing taxation in each state against spending on consumer goods, investment, military units, and subversion of other players' planets. Each state can have one of three types of government (reactionary, moderate, extremist), and each type of government will only manufacture certain types of goods. If the player wants another type of goods manufactured, the player will have to try to replace the type of government in that state.

Players then decide on whether to build up defense, go on the attack against a neighboring system, build the local economy, subvert someone else's government, or some combination.

If too many spaceships get stacked into one space, a "Godsfire" incident will happen that damages the very fabric of space to the detriment of all players.

=== Scenarios ===
The game comes with four Basic scenarios, and six Advanced scenarios, all of which have varying victory conditions defined by a certain amount of military expansion as well as a certain level of economic prosperity.

Cover of Task Force Games edition, 1985

== Publication history ==
In 1976, Thompson published Godsfire, designed by Lynn Willis and developed by Steve Jackson. Godsfire was the first of several games designed for Metagaming Concepts by Lynn Willis. It was first released as a ziplock bag game in 1976, then re-released as a boxed set in 1979. After the demise of Metagaming, Task Force Games acquired the rights to the game and re-issued it in slightly revised form (only enough counters for four players) in 1985.

== Reception ==
In Issue 11 of The Space Gamer, Robert Taylor noted that "Godsfire requires your strategic concepts to be framed within your political structures. Generally, victory will belong to the player that has the best political setup combined with a good overall strategy with the usual adherence to tactics and timing."

In his 1980 book The Best of Board Wargaming, Nicholas Palmer noted with approval the inclusion of "interplanetary coalitions, political rules, and a bubbling frivolity just under the surface of the rules [...] the game is spent on a tightrope as each player tries to reconcile the conflicting interests on his own planets while stirring unrest abroad and preparing for battle without losing sight of the 'butter before guns' objective." Palmer recommended six players as an ideal compromise between good interaction and slow play, but did admit that "Play will seem a bit slow to those primarily interested in military combat." He concluded by giving the game an average "excitement" grade of 70%, saying, "The aspect of internal dissent during interplanetary warfare is an added dimension which is all too rarely seen in science fiction games."

In the inaugural issue of Ares (March 1980), David Ritchie questioned whether game designer Lynn Willis had added too many Advanced rules, saying, "Taken together in unprocessed form, they are a wee bit too much." Ritchie pointed out that "The amount of data the players are asked to handle can be immense even when only two are competing." He concluded by giving the game an average rating of 5 out of 9, saying, "Quite long and complex but definitely worth a good look, if systems politics in the far future is your bag."

== Other reviews ==
- The V.I.P. of Gaming Magazine No. 5 (Sept./Oct. 1986)
- Games & Puzzles #69
