= Secret Liason =

Secret Liason (Note: It is actually spelled Liason, not Liaison, although in the White Wolf article it is spelled otherwise: See the cover of the game.) is a 1993 role-playing adventure for Duel published by Nightshift Games.

== Plot summary ==
Secret Liason is an adventure in which the player characters journey through a foreboding wilderness, having been hired for a caravan delivery—but must contend with the employer's secretive motives and circulating rumors, and a murder scheme subplot.

== Publication history ==
Secret Liason is a 15-page digest-sized book written by Richard Higbee, and was the first Adventure Pak that was released for Duel, published by Nightshift Games, a division of Crunchy Frog Enterprises. The art was contributed by Phil Morrissey and supplemented by 19th-century illustrations.

== Reception ==
Tony Lee reviewed Secret Liason in White Wolf #41 (March, 1994), rating it a 3.5 out of 5 and stated that "As good as it is, [the price] for 15 pages is a bit steep; Nightshift would be wise to drop the price, perhaps by a dollar."
