= GURPS Compendium II: Combat and Campaigns =

1996 supplement for the GURPS role-playing game

- Publishers: Steve Jackson Games
- Publication: 1996; 30 years ago
- Genres: Universal
- Systems: GURPS

GURPS Compendium II: Combat and Campaigns is a rules supplement for the GURPS (Generic Universal Role-Playing System), and published by Steve Jackson Games in 1996.

== Contents ==
GURPS Compendium II: Combat and Campaigns is a supplement in which rules and systems are compiled from a variety of supplements, magazines, and worldbooks. Spanning 192 pages, it focuses on advanced combat mechanics—ranging from melee weaponry and armor to space and naval warfare—and includes specialized systems from setting supplements like Lensman, Japan, Swashbucklers, and Conan. The Equipment chapter leans heavily on archaic and heavy weapons. The bulk of the book is devoted to detailed granular combat flowcharts, hit locations, and mass combat mechanics. Hazard and environment rules, as well as sections on medical issues and fatigue, are included. The Campaigning chapter is intended to guide high-powered storytelling and alternate realities.

== Reception ==
Jim Swallow reviewed GURPS Compendium II: Combat and Campaigns for Arcane magazine, rating it a 4 out of 10 overall, and stated that "Steve Jackson Games has made the Compendiums official, and so the rules presented in them will no longer be reprinted in future GURPS supplements, which is slightly irritating. As with the first volume, this is for the serious GURPS gamer only."

== Reviews ==
- Rollespilsmagasinet Fønix (Issue 17 - June 1997)
- Fractal Spectrum (Issue 16 - Summer 1997)
- AAB Proceedings (Issue 40)

== See also ==
- List of GURPS publications
- GURPS Compendium I: Character Creation, companion compendium
