= Dragons of Underearth =

Board game

Dragons of Underearth is a 1982 role-playing game published by Metagaming Concepts.

== Gameplay ==
Dragons of Underearth is a game designed as a simplified version of The Fantasy Trip and to be fully compatible with that game.

== Reception ==
Paul Manz reviewed Dragons of Underearth in The Space Gamer No. 55. Manz commented that "Dragons of Underearth is a simple FRP game that anyone new to the gaming field can learn. For those of you just starting out, it's a worthwhile game [...] Anyone who already has TFT products would be advised to stay away from this one, unless you're into counters or have got money waiting to be spent."
