= Tollenkar's Lair =

Tabletop role-playing game adventure

Tollenkar's Lair is a 1980 fantasy role-playing game adventure for The Fantasy Trip originally published by Metagaming Concepts and re-released by Steve Jackson Games in 2019.

== Plot summary ==
Tollenkar's Lair is a complete labyrinth with six levels.

Tollenkar's Lair is a solo scenario set in a tunnel complex, a six-level dungeon that gets progressively more difficult as it goes down. It is usable with The Fantasy Trip, Melee, or Wizard.

== Publication history ==
Tollenkar's Lair was written by Steve Jackson, with art by Robert Phillips, and was published by Metagaming Concepts in 1980 as a 16-page book.

When Howard Thompson published The Fantasy Trip in 1980, he felt that the price point was too high, and so he split the game up and published it as four books: Advanced Melee, which contained the extensions for the combat system of Melee; Advanced Wizard, which contained the extensions for the magic system; In the Labyrinth, which contained the rules for the gamemaster; and the adventure Tollenkar's Lair, which author Shannon Appelcline described as "a 'stocked labyrinth' (or GM adventure)".

A republished version of Tollenkar's Lair is included in the TFT Legacy Edition box set, announced as part of Steve Jacksons Games' Kickstarter campaign to reissue The Fantasy Trip.

== Reception ==
Karl Mueller reviewed Tollenkar's Lair in The Space Gamer No. 31. Mueller commented that "This adventure is a must for most Fantasy Trip GMs, especially beginning ones, both as a campaign in its own right, and as an example of what can be done with a TFT dungeon design."

Robert C. Kirk reviewed Tollenkar's Lair for Pegasus magazine and stated that " It is ideal for the novice Judge who is unfamiliar with dungeon design. Unlike the majority of play aids of this type, Tollenkar's Lair is more than a jumble of tunnels, traps, treasures, and monsters. The dungeon's existence and its layout have a reason that makes sense to the characters who dwell there, as well as to the players. The plot is cohesive. Everything hangs together. Playing Tollenkar's Lair is akin to reading a good fantasy novel, as opposed to the bewildering and often senseless series of encounters through which one is often put."
