= The Spawn of Fashan =

Tabletop fantasy role-playing game

- Publisher: The Games of Fashan
- Publication date: 1981

The Spawn of Fashan is a role-playing game published by The Games of Fashan in 1981.

== Description ==
The Spawn of Fashan is a fantasy role-playing system The rulebook includes a character-creation system, combat rules, guidelines for creating wilderness, towns, dungeons, monster descriptions, a brief description of a campaign setting (the land of "Boosboodle"), and an example of play.

== Publication history ==
The Spawn of Fashan was designed by Kirby Lee Davis, and published by The Games of Fashan in 1981 as a 96-page book, part typeset, part typewritten. The second edition was published that same year, and was fully typeset.

In 2021 the 122-page softcover 40th Anniversary edition was published. It finally added a table of contents and index, along with rules corrections and the missing tables the original edition lacked.

== Reception ==
Charles Dale Martin reviewed The Spawn of Fashan for Different Worlds magazine and stated that "it may still be worth buying. The referee's notes are excellent guidelines for any fantasy campaign. Game masters of an eclectic bent may wish to use some of the new character classes and the many tables in their own game systems. And some adventurous souls might actually play the game and enjoy it."

Ronald Pehr reviewed The Spawn of Fashan in The Space Gamer No. 49. Pehr commented that "The Spawn of Fashan is a fascinating set of fantasy combat rules which are trying to become a full role-playing game [...] its current value seems limited to experienced FRPG players who want something novel. Beginners will be baffled, and gamers happy with their current rules will find little reason to journey to the far planet of Fashan."

Lawrence Schick originally reviewed Spawn of Fashan in the April 1982 edition of Dragon (Issue 60), and refused to believe that anyone could create a roleplaying game so bad. He concluded at the time that the whole thing must be a parody. A decade later, in his book Heroic Worlds: A History and Guide to Role-Playing Games, Schick decided Spawn of Fashan wasn't a parody, although he still found it funny: "Hilariously bad fantasy system, legendary among RP game designers as the epitome of clichéd, amateurish FRP games. (Some maintain that it is so bad, it must be a hoax.) The rulebook includes a bizarrely complex character-creation system, painfully cumbersome combat rules [and] monster descriptions (with names like 'makl,' 'foklom,' 'finikor,' and 'rolmtrokl')". He also noted that this game is a "highly collectible item".
