= Mega-Duel =

Mega-Duel is a 1993 role-playing supplement for Duel published by Nightshift Games.

== Contents ==
Mega-Duel is a supplement in which a rules expansion is provided with a gamemaster's screen.

== Reception ==
Tony Lee reviewed Mega-Duel in White Wolf #40 (1994), rating it a 3.5 out of 5 and stated that "The most serious detractor of Mega-Duel is the gamemaster screen; the cardboard isn't sturdy enough to stand up straight. Instead of printing the weapon/firearm chart twice on the screen (not counting the one already in the book), a summary of the new maneuvers and modifiers would have been a better choice. That said, Mega-Duel is still a good product, one that lends a new dimension to the game. It's certainly something Duel followers shouldn't be without."
