= GURPS Martial Arts =

1990 Role-playing game sourcebook for GURPS

- Designers: C J Carella (first edition); Peter Dell'Orton and Sean Punch (second edition)
- Publishers: Steve Jackson Games
- Publication: 1990; 36 years ago
- Systems: GURPS

GURPS Martial Arts is a source book for the GURPS role-playing game, published by Steve Jackson Games; the most recent edition, by Peter Dell'Orto and Sean Punch, was released in 2007. GURPS Martial Arts includes new perks, skills, techniques, styles, weapons, and combat rules for GURPS, as well as history on the martial arts, pregenerated NPCs, and ideas for martial-arts campaigns.

== Contents ==
=== Fourth edition ===
This is an expanded version of the third edition GURPS Martial Arts (1990), revised to work with the fourth-edition GURPS rules. It adds updated versions of combat rules from third-edition books including GURPS Compendium II, many of the weapons and weapon customization rules from GURPS Low Tech, and martial arts-related elements from third-edition historical worldbooks such as GURPS Japan and GURPS Swashbucklers.

== Publication history ==
=== Third edition ===
Game designer C.J. Carella began working in the role-playing game industry with GURPS Martial Arts, published in 1990.

=== Fourth edition ===
The authors are Peter Dell'Orto and Sean Punch, who were inspired by but did not reuse the original text written by CJ Carella.

== Reception ==
S. John Ross reviewed GURPS Martial Arts in White Wolf #27 (June/July, 1991), rating it a 3 out of 5 and stated that "In general, GURPS Martial Arts is a fine and perhaps even definitive treatment of the Martial Arts as they pertain to gaming. It isn't for everybody, however. In particular, the weak points in the characters and campaigning chapters make it less of a 'must-have' for the casual GURPS customer, but it's strengths make it a fine addition to the library of any gamer who is interested in including more martial arts detail into his campaigns."

== See also ==
- List of GURPS books
