= Melee (game) =

Board game

- Cover of the second printing, 1st edition published by Metagaming Concepts
- Designers: Steve Jackson
- Publishers: Metagaming; Steve Jackson Games
- Years active: 1977 to 1983; 2019 to date
- Genres: Tactical Combat Board Game
- Systems: The Fantasy Trip
- Website: thefantasytrip.game

Melee is a board wargame designed by Steve Jackson, and released in 1977 by Metagaming Concepts. In 2019, Melee was revived and re-released by Steve Jackson Games.

== Gameplay ==
Melee is a game of arena combat in which each player generates their character by purchasing Strength, Dexterity and even equipment as part of a point-based character creation system, and then these characters fight using a tactical combat system involving six-sided dice.

A megahex polygon as used to map missile ranges in Melee.

Every figure has a strength and dexterity attribute; the sum of the two must equal 24 for a starting character.

Strength governs the size of weapons used, with higher strength weapons allowing an increase to the damage inflicted in combat, and also serves as "hit points," dictating how much damage a character can take. Dexterity determines how the chance of hitting an opponent.

=== Movement ===
Each character has a Movement Allowance (MA) that indicates how many hexes can be moved each turn. The map also has megahexes (an arrangement of six hexes around a central hex), which governs the range of missile weapons. Armor can be worn to reduce the amount of damage taken in combat at the cost of a lower Dexterity and movement allowance.

=== Combat ===
Each attack, whether missile or melee, is determined by throwing three 6-sided dice (or four dice, if the opponent dodged or defended). If the total rolled is equal or less than the attacking character's Dexterity score (when penalties for wearing armor and effects of wounds are subtracted) then a hit is scored. Each weapon has a wounding capability determined by rolling one or more dice with some adjustments. For example, a dagger does 1 die minus 1 point (for a damage range of 0 to 5), while a battle axe does 3 dice of damage. This damage is then adjusted by any protection (armor and shields) used by the opponent. For example, chain mail stops 3 hits of damage; if a battle axe struck this figure and the score rolled was 9, the figure would only take 6 damage because of the armor. Wounds can affect a figure either by giving a temporary or permanent penalty to dexterity until healed. Single powerful blows can knock a figure down.

A figure that wins a fight gains experience points; when enough points are gained they can be traded in for additional attribute points, allowing a figure to advance in power.

Advanced Melee was tied more closely to In the Labyrinth, and featured more combat options, such as called shots, additional weapons, and greater detail in general. Also, IQ (introduced in Wizard) becomes important for allowing a figure to use combat relevant talents, such as Fencing, Two Weapons Combat, and so forth, making figures more varied.

== Publication history ==
While working at Metagaming Concepts in 1977, Steve Jackson created Ogre, a small, cheap, fast two-player microgame packaged in a ziplock bag. This became the first in a line of almost two dozen Metagaming products titled "MicroGames".

At the time Jackson was also playing the new fantasy roleplaying game Dungeons & Dragons, but he considered the various-sized polyhedral dice from that game "irritating", and the combat rules "confusing and unsatisfying", especially the lack of tactics. Jackson had also joined the Society for Creative Anachronism to find a closer understanding of actual combat, and based on his experiences, he designed Melee, which became the third game in the MicroGame series.

While designing the game, Jackson saw the opportunity of expanding the Melee game into a full system of fantasy roleplaying rules that could be used to compete with D&D and started to design this RPG. Even before they released Melee, Metagaming began to advertise that role-playing system, The Fantasy Trip. Jackson also designed the magic rules, which Metagaming published as the sixth in the MicroGame line, Wizard (1978).

Metagaming then published MicroQuest #1, Death Test (1978), which was a short adventure scenario that could be used with either Melee or Wizard. Jackson intended for The Fantasy Trip to be published as a boxed set, but publisher Howard M. Thompson decided that the price was too high and so he split the game into four separate books: Advanced Melee (1980), which expanded the Melee system, Advanced Wizard (1980), In the Labyrinth (1980), and the adventure Tollenkar's Lair (1980).

Jackson disliked with this change and left the company the same year to found Steve Jackson Games. Metagaming later released Dragons of Underearth (1982), a roleplaying game which was a stripped down version of The Fantasy Trip, based on the rules from the original Melee and Wizard games. The Metagaming science fiction game Starleader: Assault relied on Melee's rules for hand-to-hand and handheld weapons combat scenarios.

Metagaming released a number of small games in plastic bags held closed with cellophane tape. The game came with a blank hex map overlaid with "megahexes" (groupings of 7 standard hexes into larger tesselating shapes for fast range determination), a counter sheet of men and monsters, and a 16-page rulebook.

After Metagaming went out of business, Steve Jackson's GURPS borrowed heavily from his first role-playing rule set The Fantasy Trip, with a similar minimal set of primary attributes to determine in-game results: Strength, Dexterity, Intelligence (which had been added in Wizard), and a new ability, Health (which was added to address shortcomings in the original damage system).

In late 2017, Jackson used a provision of U.S. copyright law to reclaim the rights to The Fantasy Trip, allowing Steve Jackson Games to re-release Melee in 2019.

== Reception ==
Martin Easterbrook reviewed Melee for White Dwarf #4, giving it an overall rating of 6 out of 10, and stated that "There are no really original ideas in this game but a number of good ideas have been combined together. Because of this I wouldn't recommend this game to anyone who has already adapted rules from several combat systems for their own use, but it is likely to be a great help to anyone who finds that it is difficult to sort out exactly what is happening during a D&D confrontation."

In the inaugural edition of Ares (March 1980), David Ritchie called the game "Clean, fast and deadly. Combats can be resolved between individual characters in 5 to 15 minutes." Ritchie concluded by giving the game a rating of 7 out of 9, saying, "Simple, but not simple-minded."

In the 1980 book The Complete Book of Wargames, game designer Jon Freeman called this "the cleanest, simplest, and most understandable role-playing game around. It's the only one that doesn't require a referee." Freeman concluded by giving the game an Overall Evaluation of "Very Good", saying, "Despite its atypicality, Melee is probably the best place for aspiring RPG players and designers to begin."

Robert C. Kirk reviewed Melee for Pegasus magazine and stated that "A veritable Hercules can be harried to his death by a nimble old granny with a dirk, but, if he can hit just once. ..."

In the book Designers & Dragons, game historian Shannon Appelcline noted that "The tactical combat of Melee worked because it was also very playable; it was simple, yet allowed for thoughtful play, all without paging through charts and tables."

In Issue 27 of Simulacrum, Brian Train noted, "Together with Wizard, this set of simple rules for individual combat formed the framework for an array of expansions (Advanced Melee and Advanced Wizard) and associated games (the programmed adventure Microquests, including Death Test; Death Test 2; Grail Quest; Orb Quest; Master of the Amulets; Security Station; Treasure of the Silver Dragon; Treasure of Unicorn Gold)."

In a retrospective review in Issue 35 of Warning Order, Matt Irsik called this "a lot of game in a little package." He noted that "it garnered quite a following by fantasy gamers who used it as the combat system for their role-playing games." Irsik concluded "For $2.95 this was a very well put together game with a lot of ideas that worked out very well in terms of game play."

== Other reviews and commentary ==
- Magia i Miecz (Issue 1 – 1993) (Polish)
- Fantastic Science Fiction, October 1980
- The Playboy Winner's Guide to Board Games
