= Sean Punch =

Canadian editor

Sean Punch (born July 27, 1967) is a Canadian writer and game designer. He is the author of the fourth edition of the GURPS role-playing game. Before he turned to writing he was a student of particle physics.

== History with GURPS ==
After writing, editing, and contributing to dozens of books for GURPS, Sean Punch took over from the game's original designer Steve Jackson as the line editor for GURPS in 1995. Assisted by David L. Pulver, another Canadian and veteran role-playing game designer, he took on the task of re-designing the entire rule system for the a fourth edition of GURPS beginning in September 2002.

Sean Punch remains the Line Editor for GURPS - equivalent to being editor-in-chief of a book series, and the key decision-maker for new rules expansions.

He lives in Montreal, Quebec.

In an attempt to acknowledge the quality and quantity of his work, some GURPS players have used his online nickname ("Kromm") to create a tongue-in-cheek cult. They leave messages in discussion groups pretending to "praise Kromm."

== Writing credits ==
=== For the Fourth Edition of GURPS ===
- GURPS Zombies: Day One (2015)
- GURPS Magic: Death Spells (2014)
- GURPS Power-Ups 7: Wildcard Skills (2014)
- How to be a GURPS GM (2014) with Warren Wilson
- GURPS Dungeon Fantasy 16: Wilderness Adventures (2014)
- GURPS Power-Ups 6: Quirks (2014)
- GURPS Template Toolkit 1: Characters (2014)
- GURPS Magical Styles: Dungeon Magic (2014)
- GURPS Social Engineering: Pulling Rank (2014)
- GURPS Zombies (2013)
- GURPS Power-Ups 5: Impulse Buys (2012)
- GURPS Dungeon Fantasy 15: Henchmen (2012) with Peter V. Dell'Orto
- GURPS Power-Ups 3: Talents (2011)
- GURPS Dungeon Fantasy Monsters 1 (2011) with Peter V. Dell'Orto
- GURPS Dungeon Fantasy 14: Psi (2011)
- GURPS Dungeon Fantasy 11: Power-Ups (2010)
- GURPS Dungeon Fantasy 6: 40 Artifacts (2009)
- GURPS Gun Fu (2009) with Hans-Christian Vortisch and S.A. Fisher
- GURPS Thaumatology: Magical Styles (2009)
- GURPS Martial Arts: Techniques Cheat Sheet (2009)
- GURPS Action 3: Furious Fists (2009)
- GURPS Action 2: Exploits (2008)
- GURPS Action 1: Heroes (2008)
- GURPS Power-Ups 2: Perks (2008)
- GURPS Power-Ups 1: Imbuements (2008)
- GURPS Dungeon Fantasy 4: Sages (2008)
- GURPS Dungeon Fantasy 3: The Next Level (2008)
- GURPS Dungeon Fantasy 2: Dungeons (2008)
- GURPS Dungeon Fantasy 1: Adventurers (2007)
- GURPS Martial Arts (2007) with Peter Dell'Orto
- GURPS Powers (2005) with Phil Masters
- GURPS Basic Set: Campaigns (2004) with David Pulver
- GURPS Basic Set: Characters (2004) with David Pulver

=== For the Third Edition of GURPS ===
==== As sole author ====
- GURPS Horror GM's Screen (2002)
- GURPS Lite (1998)
- GURPS Undead (1998)
- GURPS Wizards (1998)
- GURPS Fantasy Folk, 2nd Ed. (1995)

==== Compilations and contributions ====
- GURPS Horror, 3rd Ed. (2002)
- GURPS Low Tech (2001)
- GURPS Monsters (2001)
- GURPS WW II (2001)
- GURPS Steampunk (2000)
- GURPS Y2K (1999)
- GURPS Bio-Tech (1998)
- GURPS Traveller (1998)
- GURPS Compendium I: Character Creation (1996)
- GURPS Compendium II: Combat and Campaigns (1996)
- GURPS Martial Arts, 2nd Ed. (1996)
- GURPS Fantasy Folk Arts, 2nd Ed. (1995)

== Media mentions ==
Sean Punch has appeared in the following newspaper and magazine articles, websites, and podcasts.

=== Podcasts ===
- RPG Countdown: Sean appeared on these episodes: 18 December 2009 (GURPS Thaumatology: Urban Magics).

=== Magazine articles ===
- "The Bigger They Are, The Harder They Fall" in Pyramid #28 (Nov/Dec 1997)
- Regular contributions to Pyramid, Volume 3 from 2008 to present
