= In the Labyrinth (supplement) =

Fantasy tabletop role-playing game rules expansion

- Designers: Steve Jackson
- Publishers: Metagaming; Steve Jackson Games
- Years active: 1977 to 1983; 2019 to date
- Genres: Generic Fantasy Role-Playing Game
- Parent games: The Fantasy Trip
- Website: https://thefantasytrip.game/

In The Labyrinth is a 1980 role-playing game supplement for The Fantasy Trip published by Metagaming. An expanded version released in 2019 by Steve Jackson Games as part of the company's revival of The Fantasy Trip.

== Contents ==
The Metagaming release of In the Labyrinth contains the remaining rules for The Fantasy Trip game system, including rules for character creation, generating a labyrinth, rules for how to run an adventure, statistics and descriptions for creatures, and the table of weapons. The Steve Jackson Games rerelease includes all the same character creating and game mastering rules in addition to the full combat and magic rules published by Metagaming as Advanced Melee and Advanced Wizard.

== Publication history ==
In the Labyrinth was written by Steve Jackson and published by Metagaming in 1980 as an 80-page book.

Jackson planned for The Fantasy Trip to be released as a boxed set, but publisher Howard M. Thompson decided that the price was too high, and so he split the game up and published it as four books: Advanced Melee (1980), which contained the extensions for the combat system of Melee; Advanced Wizard (1980), which contained the extensions for the Wizard magic system; In the Labyrinth (1980), which contained the rules for the gamemaster; and Tollenkar's Lair (1980), which was an adventure.

In 2017, Jackson reacquired the rights to The Fantasy Trip and the following year his company re-released In the Labyrinth. The new, 178-page version adheres more closely to Jackson's original vision for TFT, combining in a single tome the combat, magic, and game mastering rules that Metagaming had published across three books.

== Reception ==
Steve Perrin reviewed In the Labyrinth for Different Worlds magazine and stated that "this is a very readable and enjoyable work. As a guide for GMs who devise the fantasy worlds for others to adventure in, this is an excellent reference, whether the users ever play Melee or Wizard or neither one."

Eric Goldberg reviewed In The Labyrinth in Ares Magazine #3 and commented that "ITL is as good as any FRP system currently available commercially. It has the Metagaming hallmark of easy accessibility, but also has the limitations usually found in the company's game (which, to be fair, are caused in part by the system's size constraints)."

Robert C. Kirk reviewed In the Labyrinth for Pegasus magazine and stated that "While TFT: ITL may not be perfect (nothing is), it is a step ahead of anything else and a giant step, at that. In the Labyrinth enables novice Judges and players to get into playing without extensive study and improvisation. The rules are well written, very clear, and extremely well thought out; examples abound."

== Reviews ==
- The Space Gamer #31 (Sept., 1980)
