= Wizard (board game) =

- 1978 cover
- Designers: Steve Jackson
- Publishers: Metagaming; Steve Jackson Games
- Years active: 1977 to 1983; 2019 to now
- Genres: Magical combat board game
- Systems: The Fantasy Trip
- Website: thefantasytrip.game

Wizard is a board game system of medieval fantasy magical combat published by Metagaming in 1978 that was designed to complement the previously published Melee, a system of melee combat rules. In 2019, Wizard was republished by Steve Jackson Games.

== Gameplay ==
The previously published Melee outlined the rules of melee combat using two physical ability scores, Strength (ST) and Dexterity (DT), to determine success. Wizard is an expansion of the Melee tactical system that adds magical combat. Like Melee, it also uses Strength and Dexterity scores, but adds IQ as a third ability score to determine the number and type of spells that can be learned.

When Wizard was published, most games that required character generation used dice rolls to generate ability scores. Wizard and Melee were some of the first games, if not the first, to use a point-buy system: each player was given a fixed number of points with which to buy their character's three abilities.

- Strength governs how much fatigue the figure can endure while casting spells, with each spell having an associated fatigue cost. Casting a spell causes a temporary drain on strength, limiting the number of spells one can cast before resting.
- Dexterity determines if a spell is successfully cast: the player casting the spell rolls three dice; if the sum is less than the spellcaster's Dexterity score, the spell works.
- IQ determines the number and complexity of spells a figure can learn, with one spell per point of IQ. A high IQ score – up to 16 – allows the use of more varied and powerful spells. IQ also determines whether or not an Image or Illusion spell cast by an opponent can be disbelieved.

Armor is also introduced in Wizard. Wearing armor reduces the number of hit points from opponents' successful attacks, but penalizes the character's Dexterity score.

Game components of Wizard include a hex sheet for use as a map, a set of rules, and laminated counters to be used for characters and opponents.

== Development and publication history ==
In 1977, Metagaming Concepts pioneered the concept of the microgame, a small, simple wargame packaged in a ziplock bag. The first MicroGame was Ogre, a mini-wargame designed by Metagaming employee Steve Jackson. The third game in the MicroGame series was Jackson's Melee, and the sixth was Wizard, published in 1978.

Both Melee and Wizard were expanded and re-released as Advanced Wizard and Advanced Melee, with many role-playing elements added to the basic fantasy combat system.

Melee, Wizard and gamemaster supplement In the Labyrinth eventually formed Metagaming's The Fantasy Trip (TFT) fantasy role-playing system in 1980. Jackson had wanted TFT published as one boxed set, but when Howard Thompson, owner of Metagaming, decided to release it as four separate books instead of a boxed set, and changed his production methods so that Jackson would not be able to check the final proofs of the game, Jackson left Metagaming and founded Steve Jackson Games later that year.

When Steve Jackson released Generic Universal Roleplaying System (GURPS) in 1986, some of the concepts used in Wizard were used in the GURPS fantasy supplements.

In late 2017, Jackson used a provision of U.S. copyright law to reclaim the rights to The Fantasy Trip, allowing Steve Jackson Games to re-release Wizard in 2019.

== Reception ==
In the January 1980 edition of Dragon (Issue 33), Brad McMillan liked the quality of the game components, as well as the advantages that the new point-buy system for abilities had over random determination by dice. McMillan recommended Wizard and its companion piece, Melee, saying, "Wizard is an excellent game and well worth the purchase price of US$3.95. With the addition of Melee, weapon combat can be added for a wider range of tactical possibilities. Wizard and Melee were designed to mesh, and they do so well. This game offers an innovative alternative to chance-determined characters."

In the 1980 book The Complete Book of Wargames, game designer Jon Freeman commented, "Wizard is really the completion of Melee. Though it is playable in its own right, the whole is greater than the sum of the parts." Freeman concluded by giving the game an Overall Evaluation of "Very Good", saying, "With the microgame reputation for simplicity and economy, it may be too good a bargain to be taken as seriously as it deserves."

Robert C. Kirk reviewed Wizard for Pegasus magazine and stated that "Wizard brings organization to the area of magical combat."

In Issue 27 of Simulacrum, Brian Train noted, "Together with Melee, this set of simple rules for magical combat formed the framework for an array of expansions (Advanced Melee and Advanced Wizard) and associated games that are best with both base games."

== Other reviews and commentary ==
- Magia i Miecz (Issue 5 – 1993) (Polish)
- Fantastic Science Fiction, October 1980
- The Playboy Winner's Guide to Board Games
