= Pegasus (game magazine) =

Roleplaying game magazine

- Issue 1, 1981
- Publisher: Judges Guild
- Founded: 1981
- Final issue Number: 1983; 12
- Country: USA
- Language: English

Pegasus was a gaming magazine published from 1981 to 1983 by Judges Guild.

== Contents ==
Pegasus was a magazine that included a 32-page game supplement in each issue, as well as articles about variant rules for AD&D, statistics for new magic and monsters, advice for gamemastering, as well as fiction and reviews.

== History ==
After failing with new licenses and computer games, Judges Guild instead started over on its magazines beginning with Pegasus #1 (April/May 1981), edited by Mike Reagan. The first issue was 96 pages and larger than the previous magazines from Judges Guild, but going back to the older pulp-quality pages and covers. The first issue contained a 36-page installment about the city-state campaign titled "The Black Ring" by Dan Hauffe. Members of the Guild received a Pegasus subscription, adding a 10% discount on certain products highlighted in each issue as of issue #3 (1981). Pegasus in its run included articles for D&D, Arduin Grimoire, Champions, The Fantasy Trip, The Morrow Project, RuneQuest, Skull & Crossbones, Stormbringer, Traveller, Tunnels & Trolls, Villains and Vigilantes, and Ysgarth. The staff of Pegasus changed frequently; Chuck Anshell came back as editor on issue #3 (1981) but Edward Mortimer replaced him in issue #5 (December 1981), while Mark Holmer took over with issue #9 (August/September 1982), and Mike Maddin replaced him for issue #12 (February/March 1983). Judges Guild sent Pegasus #13 to the printers, but that issue apparently disappeared and was not published before Judges Guild stopped publication altogether.

== Reception ==
W. G. Armintrout reviewed the first issue of Pegasus in The Space Gamer No. 44. Armintrout commented "I can't recommend Pegasus as a magazine. However, the installment supplement was nearly excellent. If you play AD&D and you think supplements a year for [the price] is a good deal, then subscribe."

== Reviews ==
- Perfidious Albion #51 (September 1981) p.19
