= Howard Thompson (wargame designer) =

Board game designer

- Born: United States
- Occupation: Game designer

Howard M. Thompson is an American wargame designer and founder of Metagaming Concepts. His first game was Stellar Conquest, a popular and well-designed simulation of interstellar warfare.

Thompson is most famous for his idea to publish small, low-cost games in what came to be known as the MicroGame format. For a while, Metagaming dominated this niche wargaming market.

== Career ==
Howard Thompson founded Metagaming Concepts in 1975 to publish his game Stellar Conquest when he was unable to find a publisher for the game. Thompson, as the first editor of The Space Gamer magazine, stated "The magazine had been planned for after our third or fourth game but circumstances demand we do it now." In 1976, Thompson published Godsfire, designed by Lynn Willis and developed by Steve Jackson. In 1977, Thompson pioneered the concept of the MicroGame, the first of which was Ogre.

In the early 1980s, some speculate that the company started to run into financial trouble, partially because of the generally poor economic situation at that time, and because of the split with one of his main game designers, Steve Jackson. Thompson was not satisfied with the work done on The Fantasy Trip by Jackson, stating that it was too complex and had taken too long. Thompson decided that packaging the game in a box would be too expensive, so he split The Fantasy Trip into four books, publishing them individually in 1980 as Advanced Melee, Advanced Wizard, In the Labyrinth, and Tollenkar's Lair; while the game was getting prepared, Thompson altered his production methods and thus Jackson was now unable to see the final proofs like he had on earlier releases. Because of these actions, Jackson left Metagaming and founded Steve Jackson Games that same year. Jackson purchased The Space Gamer from Metagaming, and agreed with Thompson to sell the rights to The Fantasy Trip to Metagaming. However, Thompson sought legal action against SJG for the rights to a short wargame called One-Page Bulge, and the lawsuit was settled with an agreement reached on November 26, 1981 giving Jackson full rights to One-Page Bulge, and to Ogre and G.E.V. (whose ownership was questioned during the legal proceedings). In the first SJG issue of The Space Gamer, Thompson wrote a report on Metagaming and stated "Metagaming's staff won't miss the effort. After the change in ownership Metagaming feels comfortable with the decision; it was the right thing to do."

Thompson wrote MicroQuest #3 Treasure of the Silver Dragon (1980) and MicroQuest #6 Treasure of Unicorn Gold (1981) for The Fantasy Trip and marketed each of them linked to a real treasure hunt where readers could search the books for clues to receive a prize of $10,000 from Metagaming. Wanting to publish more products for groups of players for The Fantasy Trip, Thompson signed an agreement in 1982 with publisher Gamelords to design a campaign world for the game, but only two campaign books were published before Thompson ended the agreement.

On 1 January 1982, Thompson created Games Research Group, Inc., which was initially part of Metagaming. Thompson let his two remaining wargame designers go on April 16, 1982, allowing them to work as freelancers for Games Research Group instead of working as employees. Metagaming ended its operations in April 1983 and Thompson left the games industry; Steve Jackson sought to purchase The Fantasy Trip from Thompson, but Jackson declined the offered price of $250,000. Thompson promised to come back to the field one day to publish computer games, but by 1984 he stopped returning phone calls and thereafter disappeared completely from the gaming community.

== Games designed ==
- Stellar Conquest (1974)
- Chitin: I (1977)
- WarpWar (1977)
- Treasure of the Silver Dragon (1980) (module for The Fantasy Trip role-playing game)
- Treasure of Unicorn Gold (1981) (module for The Fantasy Trip)
- Starleader: Assault! (1982)

== Illustrations ==
Thompson also provided illustrations for two of his company's games, Helltank and Monsters! Monsters!
