= The Fantasy Trip =

Fantasy tabletop role-playing game

- Legacy edition cover 2019
- Designers: Steve Jackson
- Publishers: Metagaming; Steve Jackson Games
- Years active: 1977 to 1983; 2019 to date
- Genres: Generic fantasy
- Systems: The Fantasy Trip
- Website: thefantasytrip.game

The Fantasy Trip (TFT) is a fantasy tabletop role-playing game designed by Steve Jackson and published in segments by Metagaming Concepts starting in 1977 and culminating in 1980. In 2019, Steve Jackson Games republished it as The Fantasy Trip Legacy Edition.

== Description ==
In fantasy role-playing games (RPGs) of the mid-1970s, epitomized by TSR's Dungeons & Dragons, players first randomly determine key attributes of their character such as strength, dexterity and intelligence before choosing a character class that will make the best use of the highest scores.

The Fantasy Trip was the first RPG to use a "point-buy" system. Instead of rolling dice to determine the character’s attributes, the player divides a pool of 32 points between strength, dexterity, and intelligence. Higher strength is related to better health. Higher dexterity gives a better chance of hitting an opponent. Higher intelligence allows for more powerful spells to be cast. Armor reduces the amount of incoming damage, but at the cost of dexterity. Casting a spell comes at the cost of strength.

The basic rules are outlined in two publications, The Fantasy Trip: Melee and The Fantasy Trip: Wizard.

=== Melee ===
Melee introduces a simple, fast-playing, man-to-man tactical combat boardgame that came with a small blank hex map, a counter sheet of men, monsters, and weapons (for any weapons dropped in combat), as well as a 17-page rulebook.

Every character has a Strength and a Dexterity attribute. Strength governs how much damage a figure can take and the size of weapons which can be used; heavier weapons increase the damage one inflicts in combat. Dexterity determines how likely one is to hit one's opponent. Armor can be worn, but while this reduces the amount of damage taken in combat, it lowers one's Dexterity.

=== Wizard ===
Wizard's 32-page rulebook includes most of the Melee combat system but with a new magic system. Intelligence is a third attribute that determines magical ability — a high IQ score allows the use of more varied and powerful spells. However, casting a spell will temporarily drain a character's Strength score, limiting the number of spells one can cast before requiring rest to regain Strength.

=== In the Labyrinth ===
Released as an 80-page, 8 1/2 × 11 saddle-stitched book, In the Labyrinth: Game Masters' Campaign and Adventure Guide adds a role-playing system and fantasy-world background to The Fantasy Trip. (Released simultaneously and in the same format were Advanced Melee and Advanced Wizard, which greatly expand and revise the physical and magical combat systems.)

The three books together formed the complete Fantasy Trip game system. As in the original MicroGames, each character has Strength, Dexterity and IQ attributes. New (human) characters begin with 8 points of each trait, and the player has 8 extra points to add to any or all of the abilities as desired.

In the Labyrinth also introduces a point-buy skill system, an extension and generalization of the magic system inherited from Wizard. Each character has one talent or skill point per point of IQ, and each skill has a skill point cost as well as a minimum IQ to learn it.

== Publication history ==
=== The concept ===
American game designer Steve Jackson became interested in the first fantasy role-playing game, Dungeons & Dragons, when it was first published in 1974. However, Jackson did not like either the long and complex rules nor the character creation system with its randomly determined attributes. As RPG historian St Horvath noted, house rules became a common way "to reduce randomness in favor of giving the player some sort of leeway in creating the sort of character they want to play." Jackson's solution as a game designer working for Metagaming Concepts was to design a new role-playing game system with a much simpler set of rules. Jackson's system also used a "point-buy" system for determining attributes.

Metagaming Concepts had just started publishing their MicroGame line, small and simple games packaged in either a ziplock bag or a thin plastic case. Jackson's science fiction wargame Ogre was the first in the series. MicroGame #3, published in 1977, was the first part of Jackson's new RPG, a game titled The Fantasy Trip: Melee. This was followed in 1978 by MicroGame #6, The Fantasy Trip: Wizard.

Response to Melee and Wizard was good, and Metagaming quickly produced a "MicroQuest" line of small adventures that used these rules, ultimately producing eight in the series from 1978 to 1981.

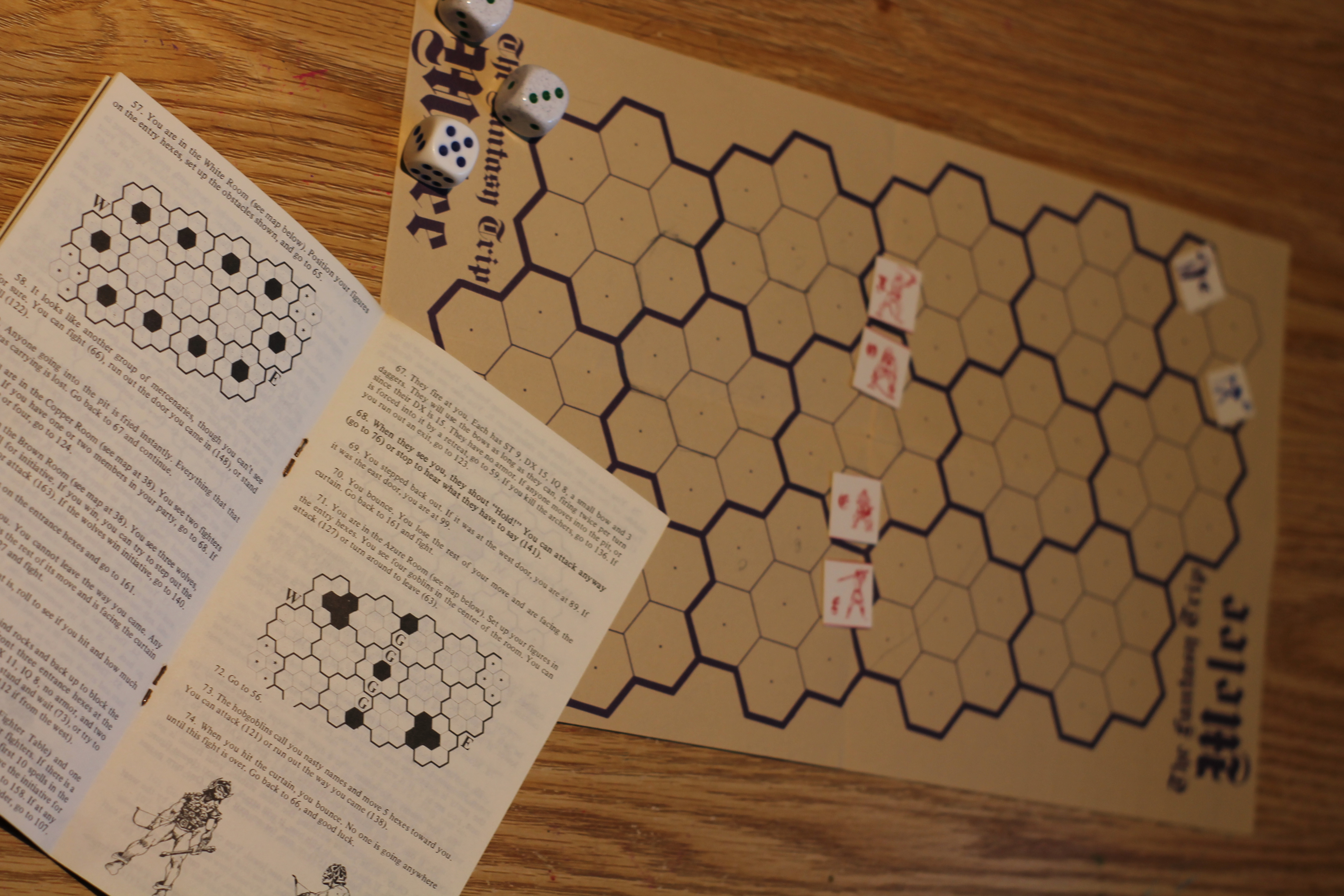
A scenario from the Metagaming version of TFT MicroQuest Death Test

=== TFT RPG ===
Although Melee and Wizard established combat and magic rules, Jackson wanted to produce a complete RPG. He revised and expanded both Melee and Wizard, adding more combat rules, more weapons, more magical items, and rules for the gamemaster, as well as a complete adventure that used the new rules. He submitted this for publication, assuming it would be released as one product. However, Metagaming president Howard Thompson disagreed with Jackson's approach, believing that it was too complex.

After Howard made changes to the game, Jackson was not shown the final proofs, and Howard published The Fantasy Trip RPG as four separate books: Advanced Melee; Advanced Wizard; In the Labyrinth (a gamemaster's guide); and an adventure titled Tollenkar's Lair. Jackson was so incensed that he left Metagaming in 1980 to found his own company, Steve Jackson Games.

Metagaming published several adventures for TFT, including The Warrior-Lords of Darok and The Forest-Lords of Dihad, published in 1982 for The Land Beyond the Mountains campaign setting in partnership with Gamelords. The Thieves' World licensed campaign setting, published by Chaosium in 1981, also included character statistics and notes for use with TFT.

Two Metagaming-published magazines, The Space Gamer and Interplay featured TFT material, including designer notes, setting expansions, and alternate rules.

In 1983, Thompson closed down Metagaming and sold most of its assets. Jackson tried to purchase the rights to The Fantasy Trip, but Thompson's asking price of $250,000 was much too high, and TFT went out of print. This led Jackson to begin work on a new "third generation" role-playing system that eventually became GURPS (the Generic Universal Role-Playing System), which was strongly influenced by The Fantasy Trip.

In 1988, Hobby Japan released a Japanese-language edition of TFT under the name Phantom Unicorn Quest (幻のユニコーンクエスト, Maboroshi no Yuniko-Nkuesuto). It combined in a single volume the rules from Melee and Wizard along with the MicroQuests Death Test, Death Test 2, Grail Quest, Treasure of the Silver Dragon, and Treasure of Unicorn Gold.

=== Jackson reclaims TFT ===
In December 2017, Jackson announced he had exercised an option under U.S. law for an author to unilaterally terminate a grant of publication rights between 35 and 40 years after publication, which allowed him to regain rights to The Fantasy Trip. In July 2018, Steve Jackson Games launched a Kickstarter campaign to reissue Melee, Wizard, and a TFT Legacy Edition boxed set with the expanded In the Labyrinth rules, among other materials. The revived TFT proved a success for Steve Jackson Games, raising more than $450,000 in 2018, and the company has committed to expanding and continued support for TFT.

=== The Fantasy Trip Legacy Edition 2019 ===
On December 26, 2017, Steve Jackson announced he had re-acquired the rights for the TFT products he authored for Metagaming, specifically Melee, Wizard, Death Test, Death Test 2, Advanced Melee, Advanced Wizard, In the Labyrinth, and Tollenkar's Lair. This was accomplished through the provisions of 17 U.S. Code § 203, which allows authors to reclaim works after 35 years. The process "took well over a year" and "was also not cheap", according to Jackson, but it allowed for the revival of TFT by Steve Jackson Games.

On July 23, 2018, Steve Jackson Games opened a Kickstarter campaign for The Fantasy Trip Legacy Edition including updated versions of all the works reclaimed from Metagaming; the new version of In the Labyrinth incorporated Advanced Melee and Advanced Wizard, as originally envisioned by Jackson. The Kickstarter campaign was funded the same day. The game was released for retail sale on April 17, 2019.

Subsequently, Steve Jackson Games has kickstarted a group of TFT accessories, Decks of Destiny, as well as a new TFT zine, Hexagram. Additional supporting materials, including adventures, solo/programmed adventures, Quick Quests, and beastiaries are also planned. The company also announced a licensing structure allowing other companies to produce material for TFT; the first such licensed project was a series of five adventures published by Gaming Ballistic in 2019.

== Reception ==
Ronald Pehr reviewed The Fantasy Trip in The Space Gamer No. 31. Pehr commented that "The Fantasy Trip is an excellent FRP game system. I'd have liked it to be better organized and a few dollars cheaper. Those who purchase it anyway will be very glad they did."

In his 2023 book Monsters, Aliens, and Holes in the Ground, RPG historian Stu Horvath noted, "The Fantasy Trip [was] the first RPG to use a point-buy skill system. Point-buy allows players direct, fine-grain control over how their character is created and developed over time." Horvath concluded, "The result is a flexible and intuitive system filled with promise."

== Publications ==
List of Metagaming products
- 3103 — Melee
- 3106 — Wizard
- 2102 — In the Labyrinth
- 2103 — Advanced Melee
- 2104 — Advanced Wizard
- 3201 — Death Test (MQ#1)
- 3202 — Death Test 2 (MQ#2)
- 3203 — Grail Quest (MQ#3). A solo adventure set in King Arthur's court, the players were knights searching for the Holy Grail.
- 3204 — Treasure of the Silver Dragon (MQ#4). This solo adventure contained clues to a silver dragon figurine hidden somewhere in the United States. The 31 troy ounce dragon was found by Thomas Davidson, who was awarded with a $10,000 check in addition to the figurine.
- 3205 — Security Station (MQ#5). A dungeon crawl through a high-tech fallout shelter.
- 3206 — Treasure of Unicorn Gold (MQ#6). Identical in concept to Treasure of the Silver Dragon, except the quest was for a small golden unicorn. No prize was awarded before Metagaming folded, and the disposition of the gold unicorn was not announced. See the link below to a website claiming to have nearly solved the mystery of the unicorn's hiding place.
- 3207 — Master of the Amulets (MQ#7). A simple hex-crawl adventure where the player explores a valley and picks up many magical amulets laying about.
- 3208 — Orb Quest (MQ#8)
- 2201 — Tollenkar's Lair
- 2202 — The Warrior Lords of Darok. The first module released in a series called The Land Beyond the Mountains, a full campaign setting designed exclusively for TFT. This detailed the province of Darok, whose inhabitants worship a mean and nasty god of war and fire. This land was to be detailed over the course of several modules, but only this and The Forest Lords of Dihad were released before Metagaming's demise. Planned modules would have detailed the provinces of "Muipoco" and "Soukor", and two or more cities, the provincial capitals. The city modules for the capitals of Darok and Dihad were redesigned and released under other names by Game Lords Ltd.
- GL-1970 — The Forest Lords of Dihad. Published by Gamelords. The last TFT release before the closing of Metagaming.
- 2301 — The Fantasy Master's Codex. Originally called the TFT Yearbook, this was planned to be a supplement that would be updated annually to include rules changes, expansions and new rules interpretations. It was also planned to include variants and expansions submitted by TFT players. Only one was released.
- 2302 — The Fantasy Masters' Screen. A cardboard screen to hide notes and maps from the players, featuring useful reference charts and tables for game play; it was similar in concept to the Dungeon Master's Screen produced by TSR for Dungeons & Dragons.
- 5102 — Dragons of UnderEarth. A compact set of fantasy role-playing rules derived from Melee, Wizard and ITL, with simplified rules for combat and magic.
- 3118 — The Lords of UnderEarth. This was a separate MicroGame of large-scale combat, but was developed to work with TFT as a system for combat involving large numbers of troops. It featured a set of conversions for building units based on TFT characters. It also featured a setting that could be used as a very large dungeon environment.
- The Fantasy Trip Character Record Sheets published by Fantasimulations Associates.
List of Unpublished Metagaming products
- Shaylle: Soldier City. Developed by Gamelords for The Land Beyond the Mountains setting, but when Metagaming went out of business the module was rewritten and issued as City of the Sacred Flame (GL-1934) for use with the Thieves' Guild rules system. The history section was heavily redone and the main non-player character's names are changed, but many of the area descriptions and the adventures remain essentially unchanged. At least one quest in this module still has the original NPC's name unchanged.
- Intrigue in Plaize. Developed by Gamelords for The Land Beyond the Mountains setting, but when Metagaming went out of business the module was rewritten and issued as Within the Tyrant's Demesne (GL-1935) for use with the Thieves' Guild rules system. As with City of the Sacred Flame, the history is rewritten, but many descriptions and references remain largely unchanged.
- Conquerors of UnderEarth (CUE). Slated to be an adventure module for use with the Dragons of UnderEarth system. It was never released but had at least progressed to the draft stage. Interplay #8 gave several details, stating that "it deals with Adventurers entering a Goblin fortress and encountering organized military units, and as such often involves 10–20 or more fighters in a battle." Since CUE was fairly streamlined, it lent itself to these sorts of encounters.

Beyond these products, additional supplements were in various stages of playtest, design, and development when Metagaming shuttered. Among these, according to a February 1982 company memo, were High Noon, an old west rules set; In the Name of Justice and Herodium, comic book superheroes rules sets; an adventure, Nosferatu; and a campaign setting, The Inner Sea.

List of Steve Jackson Games products
- SJG3450 — The Fantasy Trip Legacy Edition. A boxed set with In the Labyrinth, the Melee and Wizard mini-games, Death Test & Death Test 2 solo adventures, the Tollenkar's Lair module, a GM's screen, and additional supplies.
- SJG3452 — Melee
- SJG3453 — Wizard
- SJG3454 — Death Test & Death Test 2
- SJG3455 — In the Labyrinth
- SJG3458 — The Fantasy Trip Companion. A collection of articles from The Space Gamer and other sources from the 1980s.
- SJG3460 — The Fantasy Trip: Melee & Wizard Pocket Box. A 1980s style reprint with a locking plastic box.
- SJG3462 — The Fantasy Trip Adventures. A collection of five adventures: "The Chaos Triads", "The Curse of Katiki-Mu", "Fire in the Temple", "The Clockwork Tower", and "Tomb of the Wizard-King."
- SJG3464 — Decks of Destiny. A boxed set with a variety of card decks with adversaries, creatures, rumors, treasures, and labyrinth sections for solo or gamemastered play.
- SJG3469 — The Fantasy Trip Outdoor Adventure Cards. A deck of cards with random adventures.
- SJG3477 — The Book of Unlife. Bestiary of the undead. (April 2020 Kickstarter)
- SJG3480 — Red Crypt. A solo/programmed adventure. (April 2020 Kickstarter)
- SJG3481 — Labyrinth Planner
- SJG3482 — Deluxe Character Journal
- SJG3483 — The Fantasy Trip: The Infinite Arena. A deck of battle and hazard cards for quick fantasy combat scenarios.
- SJG3485 — Ardonirane. City sourcebook. (July 2020 Kickstarter)
- SJG3489 — The Fantasy Trip 2019 Postcard Contest. Compilation of 40 short dungeon encounters.
- SJG3492 — Warlock's Workshop. A solo adventure.
- SJG3495 — The Fantasy Trip Adventures 2. A collection of five more adventures: "Old School Adventures," "Darkness," "The Paradise Vault," "The Shining Tower," and "Amazons of the Sky Turtle." (December 2020 Kickstarter)
- SJG3497 — Old School Monsters. Bestiary of monsters from the earliest days of RPGs. (December 2020 Kickstarter)
- SJG3501 — The Fantasy Trip Labyrinth Encounter Cards. A deck of cards with random adventures. (June 2021 Kickstarter)
- SJG3502 — The Fantasy Trip Sampler Deck. New cards for the Labyrinth Encounter, Outdoor Adventure, and The Infinite Arena decks.
- SJG3507 — The T'reo School of Martial Magic. (August 2022 Kickstarter)
- SJG3601 — Tipping the Scales: Quick Quest #1. (December 2020 Kickstarter)
- SJG3602 — A Moveable Feast: Quick Quest #2. (June 2021 Kickstarter)
- SJG3603 — The Unself King: Quick Quest #3. (June 2021 Kickstarter)
- SJG3604 — The Caravan Raiders: Quick Quest #4
- SJG3605 — Black Top Hill: Quick Quest #5. (January 2022 Kickstarter)
- SJG3606 — The Halfling's Hole: Quick Quest #6. (April 2022 Kickstarter)
- SJG3607 — Incident at the Golden Badger: Quick Quest #7. (April 2022 Kickstarter)
- SJG3608 — The Maddening Song: Quick Quest #8. (August 2022 Kickstarter)
- SJG3609 — Grand Opening: Quick Quest #9. (February 2023 Kickstarter)
- SJG3610 — The Hopping Man: Quick Quest #10. (November 2023 Kickstarter)
- SJG3512B — TFT Bestiary (November 2023 Kickstarter)
- SJG TBD — The Fantasy Trip Companion 2. A collection of articles from Lester W. Smith's The Fantasy Forum and other sources from the 1980s. (announced)
- GBL0011 — Ironskull Castle (June 2019 Kickstarter)
- GBL0012 — Citadel of Ice (June 2019 Kickstarter)
- GBL0013 — Curse of the Pirate King (June 2019 Kickstarter)
- GBL0014 — The Crown of Eternity (June 2019 Kickstarter)
- GBL0015 — Vampire Hunter Belladonna. A solo/programmed adventure. (June 2019 Kickstarter)
- GBL0031 — Dragon Hunt!. A solo/programmed adventure. (May 2020 Kickstarter)
- GBL0032 — Dark Lord's Doom. A solo/programmed adventure. (May 2020 Kickstarter)
- GBL0033 — Roc of Sages (May 2020 Kickstarter)
- GBL0034 — Catacombs of Living Death (May 2020 Kickstarter)
- GBL0035 — The Sunken Library (May 2020 Kickstarter)
- GBL0036 — Character Collection 1: Experienced Adventurers. A short collection of NPCs.
- GBL0037 — Character Collection 2: Rookies (February 2021 Kickstarter)
- GBL0038 — Character Collection 3: Bandits and Outlaws (February 2021 Kickstarter)
- GBL0039 — Character Collection 4: Wizards (February 2021 Kickstarter)
- GBL0061 — Tower of the Moon
- GBL0068 — Till Death Do Us Part. A solo/programmed adventure.

== Fan activity and retro-clones ==
A number of dedicated fanzines supported the original publication. Lester W. Smith's The Fantasy Forum ran from 1987 to 1992 with a total of ten issues. Inept Adept and Goblin Keep published two issues each. A fourth fanzine, Vindicator, was devoted to MicroGames in general but did include some material specific to TFT. Vindicator published at least 14 issues from 1995 to 1998. A number of tribute and fan websites preserved and expanded TFT over the years, including a long-running E-mail discussion list archived at tft.brainiac.com.

At least two game companies have developed material inspired by and largely compatible with TFT, similar to retroclone games. Dark City Games has offered "MicroQuest"-style programmed adventures since 2005 for its Legends of the Ancient World system, as well as TFT-compatible rules and adventures for wild west and science-fiction genres. Heroes & Other Worlds similarly builds on TFT, albeit with greater deviation from the original rules.
