= GURPS =

1986 Rules for the GURPS role-playing game

- Fourth edition logo
- Designers: Steve Jackson
- Publishers: Steve Jackson Games
- Publication: 1985 (Man to Man); 1986 (1st and 2nd editions); 1988 (3rd edition); 2004 (4th edition)
- Genres: Universal
- Systems: GURPS

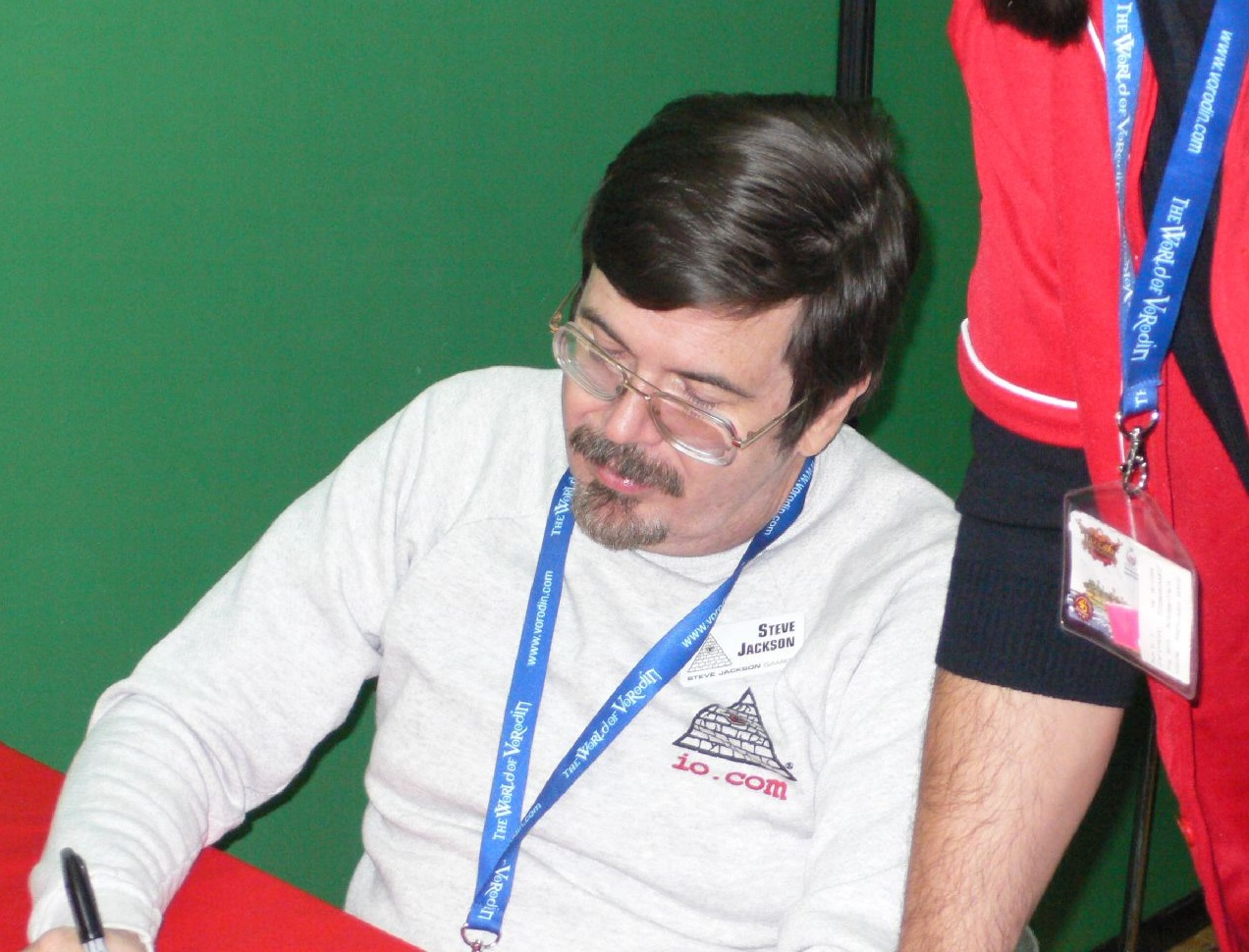
GURPS creator Steve Jackson in 2006

The Generic Universal Role Playing System, or GURPS, is a tabletop role-playing game system published by Steve Jackson Games. The system is designed to run any genre using the same core mechanics. The core rules were first written by Steve Jackson and published in 1986, at a time when most such systems were story- or genre-specific. Since then, four editions have been published. The current line editor is Sean Punch.

Sessions are run by a gamemaster, who controls the world and adjudicates the rules, with any number of players controlling the actions of a character. Most actions are resolved by rolling three six-sided dice (3d6), trying to roll below a certain number, usually a skill. GURPS uses a point-based character creation system; characters are represented by four basic stats (Strength, Dexterity, IQ and Health), and players can buy any number of advantages, disadvantages, perks, quirks and skills.

GURPS consists of a GURPS Basic Set, which contains the core rules required to run most games. In addition, more than a hundred supplemental books provide optional rules and details about different settings and genres (GURPS Martial Arts, for example). By adapting the various optional rules and systems, GURPS can be run with as much or as little detail as required, and can accommodate virtually any genre, character or style of play.

GURPS won the Origins Award for Best Roleplaying Rules of 1988, and in 2000 it was inducted into the Origins Hall of Fame. Many of its expansions, such as GURPS Infinite Worlds, have also won awards.

== Precursors ==
Prior to GURPS, most roleplaying games (RPGs) of the 1970s and early 1980s were developed specifically for their gaming genres, and they were largely incompatible with one another. For example, TSR published its Dungeons & Dragons with a fantasy genre. Another game from the same company, Star Frontiers, was a science fiction genre. TSR produced other games for other genres, such as Gamma World (post-apocalyptic adventures), Top Secret (spies and secret agents), Gangbusters (Roaring Twenties adventures), and Boot Hill (American Old West). Each of these games was set with its own self-contained rules system, and the rules for playing each game differed greatly from one game to the next. Attempts were made in Advanced Dungeons and Dragons to allow cross-genre games using Gamma World and Boot Hill rules; however, characters could only be used in a new genre by converting their statistics. GURPS was preceded by Basic Role-Playing (Chaosium, 1980) and the Hero System (Hero Games), a system that expanded to multiple genres starting in 1982.

== Development and publication ==
The precursors of GURPS were Steve Jackson's microgames Melee and Wizard, both published by Metagaming Concepts, which eventually combined them along with another Jackson game, In the Labyrinth, to form The Fantasy Trip (TFT), an early role-playing game. Several of the core concepts of GURPS first appeared in TFT, including the inclusion of Strength, Dexterity and Intelligence as the core abilities scores of each character.

By April 1984, the core rules for GURPS (at that point referred to as the "Great Unnamed Universal Role-Playing System") was being playtested in preparation for a GURPS question-and-answer seminar at Origins 1984 in Dallas. The combat system for GURPS was published in 1985 as Man to Man: Fantasy Combat from GURPS to meet the deadline for Origins 1985 and was followed up later that year by the adventure supplement Orcslayer.

GURPS first edition box set

The Basic GURPS set was published in 1986 and 1987 and included two booklets, one for developing characters and one for Adventuring.

In 1990 GURPS intersected part of the hacker subculture when the company's Austin, Texas, offices were raided by the Secret Service. The target was the author of GURPS Cyberpunk in relation to E911 Emergency Response system documents stolen from BellSouth. The incident was a direct contributor to the founding of the Electronic Frontier Foundation. A common misconception holds that this raid was part of Operation Sundevil and carried out by the FBI. Operation: Sundevil was in action at the same time, but it was completely separate. See Steve Jackson Games, Inc. v. United States Secret Service.

Steve Jackson Games released GURPS fourth edition at Gen Con on August 19, 2004. It promised to simplify and streamline most areas of play and character creation. The changes include modification of the attribute point adjustments, an edited and rationalized skill list, clarification of the differences between abilities from experience and from inborn talent, more detailed language rules, and revised technology levels. Designed by Sean Punch, the fourth edition is sold as two full-color hardcover books as well as in the PDF format.

In August 2026, a revised version of GURPS fourth edition was released. The two books forming the original fourth edition release were condensed into a single volume, with changes to indexing and the addition of new appendices. Additionally, the book's section on slavery was rewritten, and uses of harmful and derogatory language throughout the book were changed.

== Concept ==
Role-playing games of the 1970s and 1980s, such as Dungeons & Dragons, generally used random numbers generated by dice rolls to assign statistics to player characters. In 1978, Jackson designed a new character generation system for the microgames Melee and Wizard that used a point-buy system: players are given a fixed number of points with which to buy abilities. (The Hero System first used by the Champions role-playing game published two years later also used a point-buy system.)

GURPS's emphasis on its generic aspect has proven to be a successful marketing tactic, as many game series have source engines which can be retrofitted to many styles. Its approach to versatility includes using real world measurements wherever possible ("reality-checking" is an important part of any GURPS book).

GURPS has many worldbooks describing settings or additional rules, including science fiction, fantasy, and historical. Many game designers began their professional careers as GURPS writers, including C. J. Carella, Robin Laws, S. John Ross, and Steffan O'Sullivan.

== Mechanics of the game (fourth edition) ==
=== Character points ===
Characters are built using character points. Beginning characters are recommended to use 100–150 points to buy attributes, advantages, disadvantages, and skills. Non-player characters are built on 25–50 points. Heroes usually have 150–250 points, with superheroes recommended 400–800 points.

=== Attributes ===
Characters have four basic attributes: strength, dexterity, intelligence, and health. These typically range between 8 and 12, with 20 and above considered superhuman. Values are bought using character points. Secondary characteristics include hit points based on strength, will, based on intelligence, perception based on intelligence, fatigue points, based on health, damage, basic lift, basic speed, and dodge.

=== Customising characters ===
Characters are customised by advantages and disadvantages. These can often be further tailored using enhancements and limitations which modify the effects and point cost of advantages and disadvantages.

=== Skills ===
There are a wide variety of skills, with each tied to at least one attribute. Availability is often limited depending on the genre of a game. Skills have levels, and these are bought with character points.

=== Success rolls ===
GURPS uses six-sided dice for all game mechanics using standard dice notation. An "average roll" of three six sided dice generates a total of 10.5; this makes an "average" skill check (a skill of 10, based on an unmodified attribute) equally likely to succeed or fail.

A successful attribute or skill roll is when a player rolls less than or equal to the attribute or skill value. There is no target number or difficulty rating, but the gamemaster can apply modifiers to add or subtract to the skill level. A roll of 18 is always a critical failure, and a roll of 3 or 4 is always a critical success.

=== Combat and damage ===
Combat is organized in turns, with initiative based on basic speed ability. There are two kinds of attacks: melee, that includes hand-to-hand weapons, or unarmed combat and ranged, that includes bows, guns, thrown weapons. Attacks are resolved using an appropriate skill, with gamemaster providing modifiers for distance, speed and cover. Defenders usually get a chance to avoid the attack, by dodging, parrying or blocking. Damage from melee weapons, is usually based on the strength ability, with mechanical weapons having a set value. Different weapons can cause different types of damage, including crushing, impaling, cutting, and piercing. Damage is subtracted from hit points. Losing hit points can give shock penalties, representing the impact and pain that interferes with concentration.

=== Advancement ===
Characters are awarded character points to improve themselves at regular intervals, and may spend them as usual. They may also study, train or work, to gain character points.

== Licensed works ==
The computer game publisher Interplay licensed GURPS as the basis for a post–nuclear war role-playing video game (Fallout) in 1995. Late in development, Interplay replaced the GURPS character-building system with their own SPECIAL System. Brian Fargo, one of the executive producers of Fallout, stated during an interview that Interplay dropped out of the licensing deal, following fundamental disagreements on the game's content. "[Jackson] was offended by the nature of the content and where it was going. ... He saw [the opening cinematic], and he just wouldn't approve it." Jackson said "I made a lot of concessions because I want to save the project" and that he felt "all the original problems could be resolved".

GURPS for Dummies (ISBN 0-471-78329-3), a guidebook by Stuart J. Stuple, Bjoern-Erik Hartsfvang, and Adam Griffith, was published in 2006.

== Reception ==
In issue #38 of Abyss, Dave Nalle commented, "For a system which is so simple in the key areas of character creation and skills, it is interesting that a large portion of the 'Adventuring' book is devoted not to good GMing or to hints on world design, but to detailing a combat system that, while basically simple, is weighed down with a hodge-podge of special rules and exceptions which cover every possibility, but create complexity where it was not really needed." Nalle concluded, "GURPS is a promising game in many ways. There are some problems and omissions, but the rules are mostly simple and logical ... I'm not sure I can recommend GURPS for most experienced role-players, but it might be interesting as a change or for beginning players."

Marcus L. Rowland reviewed GURPS in 1986 for White Dwarf #83, and stated that "While I can applaud the idea behind the system, I can't really recommend GURPS at its present stage of development. In the long run, GURPS and all its supplements may cover more ground than other systems, possibly at less expense, but in the short term there isn't enough support material to run a fully rounded game of any type, apart from gladiatorial combat and medieval adventures."

Mike Willis reviewed Generic Universal Role Playing System for Adventurer magazine and stated that "The game, as it stands, is [...] rather characterless due mainly to a lack of background detail; doubtless this will eventually be rectified by a succession of 'monster manuals' and 'campaign packs'. At a time when the more successful games (MERP, Cthulhu, Paranoia, Pendragon, etc) are rich in atmosphere or have some unusual theme, this lack of flavour could be a serious disadvantage."

The Games Machine reviewed GURPS and stated that "If the idea of a generic system appeals, or you want a straightforward set of rules with which to run adventures in a setting of your own making, GURPS is worth a look."

In his 1990 book The Complete Guide to Role-Playing Games, game critic Rick Swan called GURPS "an ambitious design by Steve Jackson that attempts to cover every imaginable genre, setting and character type in the same game. That it achieves this goal at all is impressive; that it does so with imagination, elegance, and innovation is stunning." Swan liked the "slick mechanics", and called the game "a model of organization and presentation." Swan concluded by giving this game a top rating of 4 out of 4, saying, "Though it's amazing that a game so all-encompassing is this smooth, it's not intended for beginners. Experienced players, however, owe it to themselves to investigate this landmark design — it's possible GURPS may be the only RPG they'll ever need."

In a 1996 reader poll conducted by the British games magazine Arcane to determine the fifty most popular role-playing games, GURPS was ranked 14th. Editor Paul Pettengale commented: "Based around a points system and six-sided dice, GURPS succeeds better than most 'generic' games. The rules are flexible and it's well supported – regardless of what you want to do with it, you'll probably find a supplement with some advice and background. The game suffers from being a little too detailed at times, and can get bogged down in numbers. Still, it's an adaptable system with some superb supplements."

Scott Taylor for Black Gate in 2013 rated GURPS as #5 in the top ten role-playing games of all time, saying "GURPS is a very cool idea, especially considering it was created during a time of very hard adherence to finding a genre to fill and making a game that holds fast within it. The ability of GURPS to allow players to play in any setting with the same set of core rules captured the minds and wallets of many gaming fans during the late 1980s and is still popular today."

== Reviews ==
- Casus Belli #70 (July 1992)
- Casus Belli #71 (Sep 1992)
- 1986 Games 100
- Breakout
- Analog Science Fiction and Fact

== See also ==
- List of GURPS books
- Pyramid, a monthly online magazine with GURPS support
