= Steve Jackson (American game designer) =

American game designer (born 1953)

- Jackson at Dragon Con in 2026
- Born: 1953 (age 72–73)
- Occupations: Game designer, founder of Steve Jackson Games
- Known for: Car Wars, GURPS, Munchkin

Steve Jackson (born 1953) is an American game designer whose creations include the role-playing game GURPS and the card game Munchkin.

== Education ==
Steve Jackson was born in 1953. Jackson is a 1974 graduate of Rice University, where he was a resident of Sid Richardson College. Jackson briefly attended the University of Texas School of Law, but left to start a game design career.

== Career ==
=== 1970s: Metagaming Concepts ===
While working at Metagaming Concepts, Jackson developed Monsters! Monsters! (ca. 1976) based on a design by Ken St. Andre connected to his Tunnels & Trolls role-playing game, and Godsfire (1976), a space conquest game by Lynn Willis. Jackson got his first design for the company published as Ogre (1977), followed by G.E.V. (1978), which were both set in a futuristic universe that Jackson created.

Jackson became interested in Dungeons & Dragons, but did not like the various-sized dice or the combat rules, and bemoaned the lack of tactics, so he designed Melee in response. Jackson joined the SCA to gain a better understanding of combat, but as his interest grew he started fighting in SCA live-action combat as Vargskol, the Viking-Celt. Metagaming also published his game Wizard.

Jackson realized that Melee could be expanded into a complete fantasy role-playing game, and started working on The Fantasy Trip before Melee was even published. The Fantasy Trip was initially scheduled for release in February 1978, but the design and development required more work than Jackson had anticipated and the game was not released until March 1980. Howard Thompson, owner of Metagaming, decided to release The Fantasy Trip as four separate books instead of a more expensive boxed set, and changed his production methods so that Jackson would be unable to check the final proofs of the game. As a result of these actions, Jackson left Metagaming and founded Steve Jackson Games later that year.

=== 1980s: Steve Jackson Games ===
His game Raid on Iran was an immediate success. Jackson bought The Space Gamer from Metagaming, and sold the rights to The Fantasy Trip to Metagaming. However, Thompson sought legal action against SJG for the rights to the short wargame One-Page Bulge, and the lawsuit was settled with an agreement that was reached on November 26, 1981, leaving Jackson with the full rights to One-Page Bulge, and to Ogre and G.E.V. (whose ownership was questioned during the legal proceedings). Jackson wanted to purchase The Fantasy Trip back from Thompson after Metagaming closed down in April 1983, but Thompson declined the offered price of $250,000.

Jackson designed or co-designed many of the games published by SJ Games, including minigames such as Car Wars (1981) and Illuminati (1983), Undead (1981), and a published version of an informal game played on college campuses, called Killer. Jackson wanted to get into computer gaming software in the early 1980s, but wound up licensing the rights to Origin Systems instead, which produced games such as Autoduel (1985) and Ogre (1986).

Jackson had an idea in the middle of 1981 for designing and publishing a new detailed and realistic roleplaying system, intending it to be logical and organized well, and wanted it to adaptable for any kind of setting and play level. Jackson announced GURPS in 1983, although his time spent managing magazines delayed development of GURPS until 1984, making the combat system book Man to Man: Fantasy Combat from GURPS (1985) available for Origins 1985, and the full GURPS Basic Set appeared the next year in 1986. Sean Punch replaced Jackson in 1995 as the line editor for GURPS.

=== 21st century ===
Jackson also designed the strategy card games Munchkin (2001) and Ninja Burger (2003), and the dice games Zombie Dice (2010) and Cthulhu Dice (2010), as well as Zombie Dice variants Trophy Buck (2011) and Dino Hunt Dice (2013).

Jackson has exhibited his elaborate Chaos Machine at several science fiction or wargaming conventions, including the 2006 Worldcon.

On May 11, 2012, Steve Jackson's Kickstarter funding project for the 6th Edition of his Ogre game became the highest grossing boardgame project at Kickstarter, with 5,512 backers pledging a total of $923,680. The success of the Ogre Designer's Edition project prompted the launch of a second successful project - running from Nov 29, 2019, through Jan 6, 2020 - to help re-launch the popular Car Wars franchise as well.

=== The two "Steve Jacksons" ===
Jackson is often mistaken for Steve Jackson, a British gamebook and video game writer who co-founded Games Workshop. The confusion is exacerbated by the fact that while the UK Jackson was co-creator of the Fighting Fantasy gamebook series, the US Jackson also wrote three books in this series (Scorpion Swamp, Demons of the Deep, and Robot Commando), and the books did not acknowledge that this was a different 'Steve Jackson'.

== 1990 Secret Service incident and legal actions ==
The United States Secret Service raided the offices of Steve Jackson Games on March 1, 1990, based on suspicion of illegal hacker activity by game designer Loyd Blankenship, and seized (among other materials and media) his manuscript for GURPS Cyberpunk; when Jackson went to Secret Service headquarters the next day to ask them to return his book drafts, the Secret Service agents told him that they believed GURPS Cyberpunk was a "handbook for computer crime", despite his protestations that it was just a game. Through the newly created civil-rights organization Electronic Frontier Foundation, SJG filed a lawsuit against the government, which went to trial in early 1993 as Steve Jackson Games, Inc. v. United States Secret Service. SJG won the lawsuit, receiving $50,000 in damages.

== Personal interests ==
Jackson is an avid collector of Lego (especially pirate-themed) sets. He has written a miniatures game that uses Pirate sets, Evil Stevie's Pirate Game, and has run it at several conventions. He has been an active member of several Lego users groups, including the Texas LEGO Users Group and Texas Brick Railroad (which also reflects his liking for model trains).

== Honors ==
- Jackson has received over a dozen Origins Awards.
- In 1982, he became the youngest game designer to be inducted into the Charles Roberts Awards Hall of Fame.
- His role-playing game GURPS and card game Munchkin were named to the Origins Hall of Fame for 1999 and 2012 respectively.
- He was honored as a "famous game designer" by being featured as the king of clubs in Flying Buffalo's 2011 Famous Game Designers Playing Card Deck.
