= The Space Gamer =

Science fiction and fantasy games magazine

- Issue 1 cover 1975
- Categories: Science fiction, fantasy, tabletop role-playing games, board games
- First issue: 1975; 51 years ago
- Final issue Number: 1985; 96
- Company: Metagaming Concepts; Steve Jackson Games; Diverse Talents Incorporated; 3W Inc.; Future Combat Simulations; Better Games
- Country: United States
- Language: English
- Website: www.sjgames.com/spacegamer
- ISSN: 0194-9977

The Space Gamer was a magazine dedicated to the subject of science fiction and fantasy board games and tabletop role-playing games. It quickly grew in importance and was an important and influential magazine in its subject matter from the late 1970s through the mid-1980s. The magazine is no longer published, but the rights holders maintain a web presence using its final title Space Gamer/Fantasy Gamer.

== History ==
The Space Gamer (TSG) started out as a digest quarterly publication of the brand new Metagaming Concepts company in March 1975. Howard M. Thompson, the owner of Metagaming and the first editor of the magazine, stated "The magazine had been planned for after our third or fourth game but circumstances demand we do it now" (after their first game, Stellar Conquest). Initial issues were in a plain-paper digest format. By issue 17, it had grown to a full size bimonthly magazine, printed on slick paper.

When Steve Jackson departed Metagaming to found his own company, he also secured the right to publish The Space Gamer from number 27 on. In the first Steve Jackson Games (SJG) issue, Howard Thompson wrote a report on Metagaming and stated "Metagaming's staff won't miss the effort. After the change in ownership, Metagaming feels comfortable with the decision; it was the right thing to do." In the same issue, Steve Jackson announced, "TSG is going monthly ... from [number 28 (May 1980)] on, it'll be a monthly magazine." The magazine stayed with SJG for the next five years, during which it was at its most popular and influential. In 1983, the magazine was split into two separate bimonthly magazines published in alternating months: Space Gamer (losing the definite article with the split in Number 64), and Fantasy Gamer; the former concentrating entirely on science fiction, and the latter on fantasy. This arrangement lasted about a year. Fantasy Gamer ran six issues before being folded back into Space Gamer:

You see, we were churning out magazines - Space Gamer, Fantasy Gamer, Fire & Movement, and Autoduel Quarterly - at the rate of two a month! ... We had to find some way to preserve what little sanity we had left. The best way to do this was to merge Space Gamer and Fantasy Gamer ... As it has for the past year, Space Gamer will appear bimonthly, giving us the time to get some games done, as well.

Like Metagaming before it, the effort of producing a magazine became greater than its publisher was willing to bear. The change to bi-monthly publication was not enough to allow SJG to focus on new games as they wished, and in 1985, it was announced, "We've sold Space Gamer. We'll still be heavily involved—but SJ Games won't be the publisher any longer. Giving up SG is definitely traumatic... but it gives us the time to do other things, especially GURPS". The magazine had been sold to Diverse Talents, Incorporated (DTI). They initially had it as a section in their own magazine The VIP of Gaming, but it soon became a separate publication again with the previous numbering and format, but with the name Space Gamer/Fantasy Gamer. Space Gamer ceased publication in September 1985.

Since that time, it has gone through a number of owners, all keeping the final name, but occasionally restarting the numbering. Eventually, Better Games, now renamed Space Gamer, bought the magazine; they kept the title alive by reinventing it through the internet.

In 2010, Steve Jackson Games started republishing back issues in PDF format.

== Editors ==
Metagaming

- C. Ben Ostrander: #9 (Dec./Jan. 1976) – #26 (Jan./Feb. 1980)
- Howard Thompson: #1 (copyright 1975) – #5 (Mar./May 1976)

Steve Jackson Games

- Aaron Allston: #52 (June 1982) – #65 (Sept/Oct 1983)
  - Also Fantasy Gamer: #1 (Aug./Sep. 1983) and co-edited Number #2 (Dec./Jan. 1984)
- Christopher Frink: #66 (Nov./Dec. 1983) – #69 (May/June 1984)
  - Also Fantasy Gamer: co-edited #2 (Dec./Jan. 1984) and edited #3 (Feb./Mar. 1984) – #6 (June/July 1984)
- Forrest Johnson: #28 (May/June 1980) – #51 (May 1982)
- Steve Jackson: #27 (Mar./Apr. 1980)
- Warren Spector: #70 (July/Aug. 1984) – #76 (Sept/Oct 1985)

Diverse Talents Incorporated

- Anne Jaffe: #77 (Jan./Feb. 1987) – #82 (July/Aug. 1988)

3W Inc.

- Barry Osser & Jay Adan: Vol.II, No.1 (#86, July/Aug. 1989) – Vol.II, No.2 (#87, Oct./Nov. 1989)
- Jeff Albanese & Perrin D. Tong: #83 (Oct./Nov. 1988) – #85 (Jan./Feb. 1989)

Future Combat Simulations

- Jeff Albanese & Perrin D. Tong: #88 (Mar./Apr. 1990) {The majority of the articles printed in issue #88 were from works originally edited by Barry Osser prior to the demise of 3W Inc. and were not credited to him.}

Better Games

- Pat Mannion: #1 (Sep./Oct. 1992) – #3 (Jan./Feb. 1993)
- Red Dog: #4 (Mar./Apr. 1993) – #8 (©1994, states "93rd Issue of Publication" but was actually the 96th overall)

== Reception ==
In his review column "Triumphs & Tragedies" in The Strategic Review #6, Gary Gygax rated The Space Gamer a Triumph, noting that it includes "Sci-Fi, Fantasy, reviews, news, letters, ads, essays, and more, in a very neat and well printed format."

In issue seven of Perfidious Albion, Charles Vasey reviewed the first issue and commented, "Generally, this first issue was very interesting, with much promise for the future." A month later, Vasey found the second issue "not quite as interesting, largely because they seem to be in the lull between setting out their intentions in grand style in No. 1, and asking for contributions, and the point where the articles start to come in (if they ever do) ... However, they remain in a very good position to grow with the SF game hobby, and once they do get over the difficult period the magazine should be a mine of information on the various SFD games." In Issue 21 of Perfidious Albion, Vasey reviewed Space Gamer No. 11 and commented, "Rather too obviously a house organ with a very small group of writers. Worth considering if you buy SF games — not for those who admire well-written SF."

In issue 15 of Abyss, Dave Nalle commented, "TSG has a lot of weaknesses. Articles are of uneven quality and the editing is done by die roll. However, it has a significant strength in its emphasis on reviews." Nalle concluded by giving it an overall score of 3 out of 10, saying, "This is a useful if specialized magazine."

In issue 195 of Dragon, Lester W. Smith reviewed the magazine after it had been taken over by Better Games and noted that he had found the games published by this company to be innovative, but with a general "shoddiness of language." Smith noted that the first issue of this magazine "betrays something of that same mix of interesting ideas but rough presentation ... However, each issue shows dramatic improvement over its predecessor, and issue #4 is a real beauty." Smith concluded, "I recommend that you take a look at this new incarnation of Space Gamer/Fantasy Gamer magazine. While the material within is often too quirky for use in standard science-fiction or fantasy campaigns, it bears many good ideas."

== Awards ==
- 1977: Charles S. Roberts Award for Best Semiprofessional Magazine.
- 1982: Origins Award for "Best Professional Roleplaying Magazine".
