= Pocket box =

Small box or pocket-sized container

An empty pocket box

A pocket box is a small box or pocket-sized container, so named to emphasise its portability.

In the 1980s pocket box was used by Steve Jackson Games to describe the (usually black) plastic boxes designed to hold a 4-by-7-inch (10 cm × 18 cm) rulebook and related game components. They replaced ziplock bags previously used for the same games. Steve Jackson Games also sold empty Pocket Boxes for holding extra components or repacking other microgames. The outside dimensions of a Steve Jackson Pocket Box are 4.25-by-7.25-by-0.63-inch (10.8 cm × 18.4 cm × 1.6 cm).

Pocket Box is also used by Haba as the brand name for its small pouch designed to hang from a belt and hold a cell phone.

The term is also used generically by a variety of manufactures to describe the relative size of packaging for a variety of products.

== Pocket Box games ==
- SJG 1101 Raid on Iran (1981) based on Operation Eagle Claw
- SJG 1102 One-Page Bulge (1981) based on the Battle of the Bulge
- SJG 1103 Kung Fu 2100 (1981)
- SJG 1104 & 7100 Car Wars (1982, 1983)^{†}
  - SJG 7101 Sunday Drivers (1982)
  - SJG 7101 Crash City (1983) reprint of Sunday Drivers
  - SJG 7103 Truck Stop (1983)
  - SJG 7134 Boat Wars (1988)^{†}
- SJG 1105 Undead (1982)
- SJG 1106 OGRE (1982)^{†}
  - SJG 1107 G.E.V. (1982)
  - SJG 1109 Battlesuit (1983)
  - SJG XXXX Shockwave: An OGRE and G.E.V. Expansion Set (XXXX)
  - SJG XXXX OGRE: Reinforcement Pack (XXXX)
- SJG 1108 Illuminati (1982)^{†}
  - SJG 7104 Expansion Set 1 (1983)
  - SJG 7105 Expansion Set 2 (1983)
  - SJG XXXX Expansion Set 3 (19XX)
- SJG 1110 Necromancer (1983) two printings with different covers
- SJG 1111 The Awful Green Things from Outer Space (1988)^{†} green box

^{†} Later editions were printed in a larger box.

== Modern Pocket Box ==
In 2018, as a part of the Kickstarter campaign to bring back The Fantasy Trip, Steve Jackson Games created an updated Pocket Box container. In 2019, Steve Jackson Games ran a crowdfunding project to produce near-exact replicas of several Pocket Box games as well as associated ziplock bag expansions to those games.
