= David Ladyman =

American tabletop role-playing game designer

- Occupation: Game designer

David Ladyman is an American game designer of board games, such as Car Wars, and role-playing games, such as GURPS.

== Career ==
In 1977, while studying linguistics as a grad student at University of Texas at Austin, Ladyman began playtesting games for Metagaming Concepts, especially those designed by Steve Jackson. When Jackson left Metagaming to form Steve Jackson Games (SJG), Ladyman continued to test games for him, including Illuminati and Car Wars. Ladyman then became a games convention organizer, helping to facilitate Texcon for several years, and joining the head staff of Origins Game Fair for a year.

By the mid-1980s, Ladyman was working for SJG, overseeing development of Car Wars and GURPS, as well as editing the first issues of Autoduel Quarterly. He also authored GURPS The Prisoner, a role-playing game based on the enigmatic British television series. He also created Isaac Asimov's Star Trader board game. (After SJG discontinued publication of Star Traders, the rights reverted to Ladyman.)

After leaving SJG, Ladyman became a freelance editor and game developer. A lot of his work was for FASA, including the basic game and various adventures for FASA's BattleTech and Renegade Legion, as well as adventures for Shadowrun. His D&D work for TSR included a contribution to Tales of the Outer Planes (1988), and editing Dragon Magic (1989), and Dragon Dawn (1990). In 1990, Ladyman co-designed the second edition of the horror role-playing game Chill (1990) for Mayfair Games, with Louis Prosperi and Jeff Leason. In 1991, Ladyman joined the staff of Origin Systems, where he was the editor of Wing Commander II, Wing Commander III, Wing Commander IV, Wing Commander: Prophecy, Ultima VII, Ultima VIII, and Ultima IX. He left Origin Systems in 1997.

During the late 1990s and 2000s, Ladyman co-authored several videogame guides, including Sid Meier's Gettysburg!: The Official Strategy Guide (1997) with Melissa Tyler, and Guild Wars: Prima Official Game Guide (2005) with Andrea Silva and Rebecca Chastain. As of 2002, he was editor of Massive Online Gaming magazine. In 2012, Ladyman joined Roberts Space Industries (RSI) to edit the new monthly subscriber-only digital magazine Jump Point, which focused on Star Citizen, a videogame being developed by RSI. Ladyman retired as the magazine's editor in 2018.

In 2017, Ladyman revived the old SJG board game Star Traders, successfully using Kickstarter to publish a new edition.

== Critical reception ==
Writing about GURPS The Prisoner, Rick Swan was surprised at the choice of The Prisoner for a setting, given that "the TV series didn't give designer David Ladyman much to work with." However, Swan admitted that "Ladyman manages to ferret out the best concepts, sweep away the debris, and patch it all together with his own imaginative touches." However, Swan noted that "On occasion, Ladyman’s writing becomes aggravatingly vague, as if he’s not quite sure what’s going on either." Swan concluded by giving the book an above average rating of 4 out of 5 stars, saying "The Prisoner provides all the raw material a creative referee needs to put together a campaign rife with psychological terror, sort of like the Paranoia game without the laughs."

Lester W. Smith reviewed the second edition of Chill co-authored by Ladyman, and found it far more polished than the original 1st edition, although he admitted that "Some old players may find the atmosphere change to be disconcerting. Personally though, I'm impressed."

Karington Hess reviewed the new edition of Star Trader for Malted Meeple, and was generally positive about the board game, saying, "The game is easy to learn, but offers plenty of variation so it won’t go stale. Star Traders blends negotiation, pickup and delivery, clever strategy, and risk-reward seamlessly."
