= East Midville =

1983 board wargame expansion

East Midville is an expansion for the Mad Max-like board wargame Car Wars published by Steve Jackson Games (SJG) in 1983.

== Description ==
East Midville is a supplement with maps of two streets that expand the town of Midville, Ohio originally presented in the supplement Sunday Drivers. The game also includes 31 vehicle counters, a rule book and several scenarios.

== Publication history ==
In 1981, SJG released the board wargame Car Wars, which proved popular. The company released several expansions for it, the third being East Midville, designed by Steve Jackson and released in 1983.

== Reception ==
In Issue 70 of The Space Gamer, Craig Sheeley commented "East Midville is a real bargain for the price, and the extra counters make it worth buying. And if you can find a 4' x 6' table to put them on, combine the maps from East Midville and Sunday Drivers for a mass shootout and running gunfight of epic proportions."

The UK games magazine Imagine noted that "East Midville has two street maps that link with the Sunday Drivers map, making for a truly huge playing area."

GeekDad commended this expansion for "providing even more areas ripe for destruction."
