= The AADA Vehicle Guide =

Game supplement

The AADA Vehicle Guide is a 1984 supplement for Car Wars published by Steve Jackson Games.

== Gameplay ==
The AADA Vehicle Guide is a supplement which includes 129 descriptions of different vehicles, with a brief analysis, game statistics, and variations for each vehicle.

== Publication history ==
When the supplement was imported to England, it was impounded for several months after a spot check by customs at Dover, under the claim that the book was a mail order catalogue for terrorist weaponry.

== Reception ==
Craig Sheeley reviewed The AADA Vehicle Guide in Space Gamer No. 71. Sheeley commented that "The AADA Vehicle Guide is a prize. Grab it while it lasts; I predict that the shelves will empty of this very quickly."

GeekDad wrote that The AADA Vehicle Guide had "SJG created the AADA, the American Autoduel Association, a real organization for Car Wars fans to join. It was inevitable that the AADA would release a car buyer's guide, right?"
