= Jonathan Leistiko =

Jonathan Leistiko is a prolific board game designer from Pflugerville, Texas, who grew up in Pennsylvania and Rhode Island. Leistiko is credited as the designer of over 100 board games or game items since the year 2000 and is credited with more board game and card game designs than just about any living American-born game designer outside of the wargaming field other than fellow Texan Steve Jackson and James Ernest, owner and lead designer of Cheapass Games.

Leistiko moved to Austin, Texas in 1999. He attended Texas State University in San Marcos, Texas. Leistiko worked at Steve Jackson Games as a game developer for about half a year and was a playtester for them for versions of games such as Zombie Dice, Cthulhu Dice, and Munchkin. He has also been working as the webmaster for a website which provides information for veterans in Texas. Leistiko co-owned and co-ran a retail game store in State College, Pennsylvania, for about 5 years. He is credited with co-designing and co-publishing Inevitable, the first successful board game on Kickstarter. His favorite game designers include Matt Leacock and Andrew Looney.
