= GURPS Autoduel =

- Cover by Denis Loubet
- Designers: Aaron Allston; Scott Haring
- Publishers: Steve Jackson Games
- Publication: 1986 first edition; 1997 second edition
- Genres: Post-apocalyptic science fiction
- Systems: GURPS

GURPS Autoduel is the GURPS genre toolkit book which details the post-apocalyptic world of one of SJG's other popular games, Car Wars. The initial publication was in 1986.

== Contents ==
GURPS Autoduel is a supplement for GURPS describing role-playing in the world of Car Wars, a dark future society where adventurers battle it out on the super-highways with armed and armored cars and trucks. This book covers character creation guidelines, new equipment, and rules for vehicle design and combat, plus two miniscenarios and cardstock miniatures.

In this setting (by tradition, fifty years ahead of the current time), characters are involved in autoduelling: combat in armed and armored motor vehicles such as cars, motorcycles, or semis. The sourcebook contains rules for designing vehicles, additional skills used by autoduellist characters, and new technology and social conditions of the world. Additional rules for conversion of Car Wars vehicles to GURPS Autoduel are included.

== Publication history ==
GURPS Autoduel was written by Aaron Allston and Scott Haring, with a cover by Denis Loubet, and was first published by Steve Jackson Games in 1986 as a 96-page book. Additional material is by Steve Jackson and Allen Varney with editing by W. G. Armintrout. Interior illustrations are by Mark Angeli, Angela Bostick, Graham Chaffee, Norman Doering, C. Bradford Gorby, Denis Loubet, Dan Panosian, Kim Strombo, Michael Surbrook, Jason Waltrip, John Waltrip, and George "Speed" Webber.

GURPS Autoduel was the second GURPS setting published, after Yrth in GURPS Fantasy. Seven volumes of the The AADA Road Atlas and Survival Guide were published for use with GURPS Autoduel and Car Wars between 1987 and 1989. This set of sourcebooks for the Autoduel world detail different parts of the US and Australia:

- Volume 1: The East Coast
- Volume 2: The West Coast
- Volume 3: The South
- Volume 4: Australia
- Volume 5: The Midwest
- Volume 6: The Free Oil States
- Volume 7: The Mountain West

Each book contains descriptions of major cities and roads, and includes maps of some cities' arenas.

Autoduel has many scenarios available and the system allows for players to make their own. The objectives of scenarios vary: sometimes the only objective is to make it successfully through a harrowing gauntlet, other times the players compete in a dueling arena to win virtual cash prizes with which to upgrade their cars.

== Reception ==
Ken Rolston reviewed GURPS Autoduel for Dragon magazine #127 (November 1987). He comments: "The Autoduel game has all the mechanics it needs to support roleplaying in the ultraviolent world of Car Wars games. The GURPS game is strong in game values (Steve Jackson Games has always been strong in game values), and the Car Wars game, the inspiration for Autoduel material, has been a very successful board game, so I wasn't surprised to find lots of detailed rules for blowing cars, driver, passengers, innocent bystanders, and neighboring real estate into tiny bits." Rolston concludes by saying, "I didn't expect that the Autoduel game would also have a fleshed-out campaign world, extensive notes on designing and presenting adventures and campaigns, and plenty of GM staging tips, both in the text and in nice marginal essays. Entertaining, impressive, and just plausible enough as a setting for vehicular homicide on an epic scale, this supplement is definitely worth a look."

Jim Bambra reviewed GURPS Autoduel for Dragon magazine #149 (September 1989). Bambra comments in his evaluation of the game: "The GURPS Autoduel game presents an interesting and detailed setting for near-future role-playing. The well-presented background and the emphasis on role-playing rather than combat makes the GURPS Autoduel game much more than it first appears. As an added bonus, the GURPS Autoduel game has received consistently good support since its appearance [...] As a near-future setting, the GURPS Autoduel game scores high. Its game mechanics are detailed and mesh nicely with the GURPS Basic Set. If you love the Car Wars game, you can't afford to be without this. If you're not a fan of Car Wars, don't let its initial appearance deceive you; this game can be played without the characters ever coming anywhere near an armed car."

J. Michael Caparula reviewed GURPS Autoduel in Space Gamer/Fantasy Gamer No. 81. Caparula commented that "I would recommend GURPS: Autoduel with some qualifications. GURPS players with a budding interest in Car Wars would do well to pick it up. Everything necessary for Car Wars is here, including an improved combat system."

GURPS Autoduel received the Origins Award nomination for Best Roleplaying Supplement of 1986.

Jim Swallow reviewed GURPS Autoduel for Arcane magazine, rating it a 6 out of 10 overall, and stated that "Autoduel leans toward an audience of ex-Car Wars players, so if you're one of these, you'll have no problems jumping straight in. Newbies might find it a little 'open plan' to begin with, but it's worth sticking with it. There's a wealth of support material out there for the Car Wars world, and GURPS Autoduel recaptures the spirit of the original game in an undiluted, pure-nitro form."

== Reviews ==
- Games Review #11
- Shadis #35

== See also ==
- Autoduel Quarterly – Magazine for the Car Wars tabletop game
- List of GURPS publications

== External articles ==
Official

- GURPS Autoduel.
- Errata - GURPS Autoduel, second edition. September 2, 1999.
- Autoduel Quarterly magazine - online archives

Resources

- GURPS Autoduel - Resources. February 1998.
