= Car Wars Reference Screen =

1983 Car Wars game supplement

Car Wars Reference Screen is a 1983 supplement for Car Wars published by Steve Jackson Games.

== Gameplay ==
The Car Wars Reference Screen is a three-panel fold-out screen which includes listings such as maneuver tables, weapon charts, and crash tables for Car Wars, and an index.

== Reception ==
In the Nov-Dec 1983 edition of Space Gamer (No. 66), Craig Sheeley commented that "If you don't buy Autoduel Quarterly, or you really need all the Car Wars charts in one place, buy this screen. Otherwise, you can get the Advanced Collision System in the Summer 2033 Autoduel Quarterly, and skip paying [...] for this screen. I just can't recommend it for the price."

In the December 1983 edition of White Dwarf (Issue 48), Marcus L. Rowland thought that the collision system on the screen was good, "but most of the rest seems unnecessary." He gave the screen a below-average rating of 6 out of 10.

Jerry Epperson reviewed Car Wars Reference Screen in Ares Magazine #17 and commented that "It gets the mission accomplished, but with a little more foresight and expense, it could have been invaluable. Should you hop into your Porsche 911, buzz down to ol' hobby shop, and pick up a copy? Only if you use screens a lot in your gaming sessions. Otherwise there are plenty of cheaper methods to obtain the same result."
