= Armadillo Autoduel Arena =

Game supplement

Armadillo Autoduel Arena is a 1983 supplement for Car Wars published by Steve Jackson Games.

== Gameplay ==
Armadillo Autoduel Arena is a supplement that debuts the first autoduelling arena in the United States, which was constructed around a deserted shopping mall.

== Reception ==
Craig Sheeley reviewed Armadillo Autoduel Arena in Space Gamer No. 67. Sheeley commented that "As a whole, the Armadillo Autoduel Arena is an unusual place to duel, due to interrupted line-of-sight and the necessary gambit of screaming around the central bunker at high speed to see anybody. I find it a welcome break from road dueling. A must for Car Wars fans."

GeekDad wrote that Armadillo Autoduel Arena was "an enclosed arena that would make the old Demolition Derby's look like a pillow fight [...] both 21" x 32" maps combined to create the playing area. I have fond memories of using this map quite a bit because anytime a player's car was totaled but the driver survived, that player would inevitably try to make a run for the center buildings. Key word – 'try.'"
