= Car Warriors (comics) =

1991 comic book series

Publication information
- Publisher: Marvel Comics
- Schedule: Monthly
- Format: Limited series
- Genre: Post-apocalyptic
- Publication date: June – September 1991
- No. of issues: 4

Creative team
- Created by: Steve Jackson; Sharleen Lambard
- Written by: Chuck Dixon
- Penciller: Steve Dillon
- Inker: Phil Winslade
- Letterer: Jade Moede
- Colorist(s): Steve Buccellato; Joe Rosas (issue 2)
- Editor(s): Marie Javins; Mindy Newell (issues 3–4)

Car Warriors is an American science fiction four-issue comic book series published in 1991 by Marvel's imprint Epic Comics. It was followed by a three-volume series of novels set in the same world but featuring different characters.

The series was conceived by Steve Jackson and Sharleen Lambard of Steve Jackson Games based on the board game Car Wars.

== Setting ==
2038 America after a series of natural and man-made disasters have changed the country. The Grain Blight destroyed crops causing widespread famine, and wars over dwindling resources culminated in a limited nuclear exchange.

During the dark years, life in America was similar to the post-apocalyptic world of Mad Max and the roads were ruled by heavily armed biker-gangs. In response, average citizens had to arm their cars in self-defense, and by the time the country began to recover, auto duelling had become the nation's most popular sport (both on the open road and in specially built arenas).

The main character, Chevy Vasquez, lost his parents and sister to a biker gang attack during those dark years, and is now a successful arena auto duellist. He is approached by a wealthy individual who wants to back Vasquez in The Delorean Run!.

== Car Wars ==
It was intended that each issue of the series have a page giving Car Wars game statistics for new items from the story, but issue three had none, and issue four had two pages.

Issue 1

- Vasquez's $118,825 Camper from The Delorean Run.

Issue 2

- Roof Gun, a pintle, used by a family competing against Vasquez.
  - Swing-Out Roof Mounting and Suitcase Roof Armor
- Satan's Tears – a street drug with stats for Car Wars and GURPS.

Issue 4

- Soya-Blimp – a custom airship
  - Custom Envelope, Exterior Viewscreen and Broadcast Facility
- Mecha-Shan: The Rolling Tiger – A $125,980 custom car/driver competing against Vasquez. This character also uses equipment from the Autoduel Quarterly article "Cybernetics in Car Wars".

== Novels ==
This three-volume "Car Warriors" series of novels was published by Tor Books later in the 1990s. While set in the same world as the comic book, they take place later, and feature different characters:

- The Square Deal (1992) by David Drake (ISBN 0-8125-1989-2 & 0-8125-3030-6)
- Double Jeopardy (1994) by Aaron Allston (ISBN 0-8125-3463-8)
- Back from Hell (1999) by Mick Farren (ISBN 0-8125-1990-6 & 0-8125-1991-4)
