= Space Raid! =

Space Raid! is a 1978 board game published by House of Pilgrim.

== Gameplay ==
Space Raid! is a game in which each player is in command of a fleet consisting of 48 ships from six classes of ship.

== Reception ==
David Ladyman reviewed Space Raid! in The Space Gamer No. 42. Ladyman commented that "I believe the designers are trying very hard to convince you that this game is worth playing. [...] If you are a wargamer, it isn't. It isn't challenging enough for regular gaming, or fun enough for those 3 a.m. sessions. Even for your 8-year-old niece or nephew, I think you could make a better buy, at half the price."
