= SpyKor =

Play-by-mail wargame

- Publisher image for SpyKor
- Publishers: Sudden Asylum Games
- Genres: Role-playing, wargame
- Languages: English
- Players: 8
- Playing time: Fixed
- Materials required: Instructions, order sheets, turn results, paper, pencil
- Media type: Play-by-mail or email

SpyKor is a closed-end, computer-moderated, play-by-mail game. A game of low-medium complexity, it was published by Sudden Asylum, of Pflugerville, Texas and playable by mail or email. The game had a near-future setting. Eight players acted as the CEO of massive corporations vying for global domination through varying means, including war, espionage, and economics. The game received generally positive reviews in gamer magazines in the 1990s.

== History and development ==
SpyKor was a closed-end PBM published by Sudden Asylum, of Pflugerville, Texas. The gamemaster was Mike Childress. It was a PBM game of low-medium complexity playable by mail or email. The game launched in 1994 after playtesting.

== Gameplay ==
SpyKor had a near-future setting. The publisher described it as a game of "corporate warfare". Reviewer Patrick M. Rodgers said it was not a pure wargame, as roleplaying aspects such as intrigue and interaction with the public were as important as combat, with economic and financial activity also a factor. He compared gameplay themes to Illuminati.

Gameplay occurred on a map comprising 238 square sectors of varying characteristics which could be controlled by diplomacy or force. Eight players per game role-played CEOs of "mega-incredibly huge mega-maxi conglomerates" called Korporati, or Kor for short. These organizations wielded global power with the loss of national borders. Each Kor had a focus area such as: aeronautics, communications, drug cartel, energy, importing, and pharmaceuticals. Kors also had a "special power" which could be bonus spy actions, Cheaper Tech Research, a 50% credit bonus, Crime Lord, Double Resource Production, Rapid Military Recruitment, or Superior Infantry.

Players started with one city and an armed forces comprising an army and air force. Each player could provide orders for their Kor's spies and public-facing representatives or "reps". Reps could "conduct negotiations, trade stocks, launch propaganda campaigns, convert enemy agents", and do other actions. Reps in the game included Cindy Crawford and George Foreman.

Corporate levels available were military, subversion, espionage, sabotage, and economics. Various player actions were available, such as stock market play as well as "assassinations, stock thefts, underworld dealings, and sabotage". A player's public relations (PR) level was important, rising with actions such as "combating plagues, donating money to charity, and relinquishing control of a sector", while "nefarious" activities could lower a PR level. Technology (or tek) levels could also be raised during play.

Players could win by defeating the other seven players, attaining 250,000 credits (game money), or by achieving their individual victory conditions. (Note: According to Phil Rodgers, the victory conditions required a player "to own at least 101 shares of another Kor's stock, and to control five specific sectors, three of which are the headquarters of other Kors.") Various factors could also cause a loss, including having zero sectors at the end of a turn, or too few credits or public relations points.

== Reception ==
Patrick M. Rodgers reviewed SpyKor for Pyramid magazine and stated that "SpyKor is an excellent game for beginners, and truly offers challenging play for veteran gamers as well. Suffice it to say that there is substantial breadth to the game, and enough depth to make it interesting without making it too complicated. In short, players can do quite well wading in the SpyKor pool, and will enjoy swimming in the deep end when they feel ready for it."

Patrick M. Rodgers reviewed the game in the September–October 1995 issue of Paper Mayhem, stating, that the game "is a versatile, enjoyable game that should appeal to a broad spectrum of PBM gamers. I enjoy it and recommend it highly." Debbie Thompson reviewed the game in a three-part diary in Flagship, concluding that "SpyKor reminds me a lot of Mr. Toad's Wild Ride. You really have to hang on for dear life. You can't get discouraged when a turn goes badly, because you might be right back on top the next tum. Besides, all players am having exactly the same sort of difficulties you are. I would definitely recommend SpyKor to gamers. You get: "a quality GM", "reliable turnaround", and "a good game".

== See also ==
- List of play-by-mail games
- Illuminati (play-by-mail game)

== Bibliography ==
- Rodgers, Patrick M. (July–August 1994). "Postmarque: Ship Ahoy! New PBM Games Spotted: SpyKor". Shadis. No. 14. p. 92.
- Rodgers, Patrick M. (September–October 1994). "SpyKor". Shadis. No. 15. pp. 101–102.
- Rodgers, Patrick M. (September–October 1995). "Tyrrany for You: A Review of SpyKor". Paper Mayhem. No. 74. pp. 14, 16–17.
- Sudden Asylum (January–February 1995). "Gameline: Sudden Asylum; SpyKor". Paper Mayhem. No. 70. pp. 27–28.
- Thomson, Debbie (July–August 1995). "SpyKor Diary: Multinational Corporations Go to War". Flagship. No. 56 (U.S. ed.). pp. 31–33.
- Thomson, Debbie (November–December 1995). "SpyKor Diary: Multinational Corporations Go to War: Final Part". Flagship. No. 57 (U.S. ed.). pp. 29–30.
