= The AADA Road Atlas and Survival Guide =

Tabletop role-playing game supplement for GURPS Autoduel

- Volume one 1987
- Publishers: Steve Jackson Games
- Publication: 1987 to 1989
- Genres: Post-apocalyptic science fiction
- Systems: GURPS

The AADA Road Atlas and Survival Guide was a series of supplements for GURPS and Car Wars published between 1987 and 1989 by Steve Jackson Games.

== Contents ==
Steve Jackson Games published seven AADA Road Atlases for use with GURPS Autoduel and Car Wars between 1987 and 1989. The entries in this series included:

- The AADA Road Atlas and Survival Guide Volume One: The East Coast (1987)
- The AADA Road Atlas and Survival Guide Volume Two: The West Coast (1987)
- The AADA Road Atlas and Survival Guide Volume Three: The South (1987)
- The AADA Road Atlas and Survival Guide Volume Four: Australia (1987)
- The AADA Road Atlas and Survival Guide Volume Five: The Midwest (1988)
- The AADA Road Atlas and Survival Guide Volume Six: The Free Oil States (1988)
- The AADA Road Atlas and Survival Guide Volume Seven: Mountain West, (1989), designed by Jeffrey D. George

Each book covered a different region of the United States. Some information was strictly factual, like road conditions and number of hospitals, along with road maps of the region. Fictional elements would include organizations and groups such as BLUD ("Big League Unlimited Duelling") that the players might meet. Each book also included a short adventure scenario.

== Reception ==
Two reviews appeared in Dragon:

- In the December 1987 edition (Issue #128), Ken Rolston reviewed Volume One: The East Coast, and found it "surprisingly plausible." Rolston thought it "made good reading, with useful game information and adventure hooks." Rolston also found the included adventure Escape from Poughkeepsie "pretty convincing", and concluded that "Road Warrior and post-holocaust fans should be well-satisfied."
- In the September 1989 edition (Issue 149), Jim Bambra reviewed Volumes 1–6, and found the included mini-adventures to be "of a consistently high standard and are aimed at getting players out of their duelling vehicles." He concluded with a thumbs up, saying, "If you like the GURPS Autoduel game, you’ll find these books to be an excellent source of background material and ideas."

In the June 1989 edition of Games International (Issue 6), James Wallis reviewed the seventh and last book of the series, Mountain West, and called it "well researched and written in a pleasantly tongue in cheek style." He concluded by giving the book an average rating of 3 out of 5, saying, "useful for anyone with an interest in this type of game."

== Other reviews ==
- Casus Belli #45 (June 1988)
- Australian Realms #5 (Volume 4)

== See also ==
- List of GURPS publications
