= Car Wars The Card Game =

Card game

Car Wars: The Card Game is a card game version of Steve Jackson Games' Car Wars miniatures game.

== Gameplay ==
Players have a card in front of them to represent the car that they're using to battle other players. In turn, each player plays attack cards to try to do damage to the other players' cars, and the other players respond with armor and maneuver cards to avoid the damage. The object of the game is to make sure your car is the last one functional.

Steve Jackson Games also publishes Battle Cattle: The Card Game, based on Wingnut Games' Battle Cattle miniatures game. The game mechanics are the same as Car Wars: The Card Game, so the two games can be combined, with some players playing cows and other players playing cars.

== Reception ==
Reviewer Shannon Appelcline said (of the 2nd edition game) "It's based on a fun concept--blowing the heck out of each others cars'--the box design is appealing, and there's a matching Battle Cattle game that's compatible. ... when you actually begin reading the rules and playing the game the product starts to lose its luster." He described the game as having an "extremely high" random factor and concluded his review stating "I'm fairly certain there's a damned good game in this box somewhere, it's just not the one described in the rulebook."

== Reviews ==
- Backstab #35
