= Truck Stop (Car Wars) =

1983 supplement for Car Wars published by Steve Jackson Games

Truck Stop is a supplement published by Steve Jackson Games (SJG) in 1983 for the board wargame Car Wars.

== Gameplay ==
Truck Stop is a supplement that includes rules for using 18-wheel semi-trailer trucks in Car Wars.

Car Wars is a game of heavily armed cars engaged in Mad Max-style combat. Truck Stop is a supplement that adds rules and counters for 18-wheeler trucks. In addition to rules for building and handling these trucks, the rules include a list of new weapons specific to trucks artillery, heavy lasers and antipersonnel grenades. The supplement also includes a map of a map of a fortified truck stop.

The original Car Wars rules and counters are required to fully play the game.

== Publication history ==
SJG published Car Wars in 1980. It proved popular and SJG followed up with several supplements, including Truck Stop, designed by Steve Jackson and published in 1983 as a microgame.

In 1987, Hobby Japan released a Japanese-language edition titled トラック・ストップ (Torakku sutoppu).

== Reception ==
In Issue 63 of The Space Gamer, Craig Sheeley commented "Car Wars players have been waiting for this ever since the game came out, and their wait is justified. If you liked the movie Road Warrior, if you like the idea of an unstoppable convoy, if you just like the idea of armed rigs, get this. But you must have Car Wars to use it."

In Issue 18 of the French games magazine Casus Belli, Martin Latallo noted that there were rudimentary rules for role-playing, writing, "the rules concerning the characters are further improved as well as the abilities (skills). There is even an organization that does cloning!" Latallo concluded, "Truck stop is full of good ideas. and it is in my opinion an essential supplement for any Car Wars player."

GeekDad wrote that Truck Stop "would add a bit more flavor to the original game by providing tractor-trailer combos. Going up against my friends car-to-car was quite fun, but there’s something truly unique and memorable when three of my gaming buddies are taking on another pal who is driving an 18-wheeler with three machine gun turrets on top, more armor (points) on a single side of the trailer than all three of our cars combined, and enough speed to plow through any of us who get in front of him."
