= GURPS The Prisoner =

Role-playing game suppplement

GURPS The Prisoner is a supplement published by Steve Jackson Games in 1990 for the role-playing game GURPS that is based on the 1960s TV series The Prisoner.

== Contents ==
GURPS The Prisoner is a rules supplement that uses the setting of "The Village" from the British TV series The Prisoner. Like the TV series, the player characters wake up in a village they are unable to leave, punished for infractions of multitudinous rules, and unable to find out where they are or why they are there.

The book is divided into two sections. The setting is laid out in the first section, and includes a map of The Village, as well as village protocol such as dress and appropriate greetings. The second section provides hints to the gamemaster about how to develop suspense, how to answer players' questions, and how to pepper the adventure with weird encounters. The book also contains the introductory adventure scenario "Arrival".

== Publication history ==
GURPS The Prisoner is a 96-page softcover book written by David Ladyman with additional material by Stephen Beeman, with illustrations by John Robinson. It was published by Steve Jackson Games in 1990.

== Reception ==
In the February 1993 edition of Dragon (Issue #190), Rick Swan was surprised at the choice of The Prisoner for a setting, given that "the TV series didn't give designer David Ladyman much to work with." However, Swan admitted that "Ladyman manages to ferret out the best concepts, sweep away the debris, and patch it all together with his own imaginative touches." However, Swan warned that "The Prisoner won't be everybody's idea of a good time, what with its near-powerless player-characters, absence of action, and unsolvable mysteries." He also noted that "On occasion, Ladyman’s writing becomes aggravatingly vague, as if he’s not quite sure what’s going on either." Swan concluded by giving the book an above average rating of 4 out of 5 stars, saying "The Prisoner provides all the raw material a creative referee needs to put together a campaign rife with psychological terror, sort of like the Paranoia game without the laughs."
