= INWO Book =

The INWO Book is a book published by Steve Jackson Games (SJG) in 1995 about the company's satirical collectible card game (CCG) Illuminati: New World Order.

== Description ==
With CCGs on the rise in 1994 following the release of Magic: The Gathering, Steve Jackson Games published Illuminati: New World Order (INWO), a CCG with complex rules that won the 1994 Origins Award for Best Card Game. The game was immensely popular — Jackson reported that "pre-sales alone were more than 10 times as much as for any game we'd done before."

The following year, SJG published a guidebook about INWO titled The INWO Book, subtitled "Being a Compendium of Lore, Lies, Damned Lies and Statistics concerning the New World Order of the Il;luminated Masters." The 152-page paperback was written by Steve Jackson, with illustrations by John Kovalic, David Martin, Shea Ryan, and Dan Smith.

The book contains

- Steve Jackson's production reports about planning sessions leading up to the publication of the game
- complete and updated rules, as well as optional rules and variant games
- official tournament rules
- suggested strategies and deck builds
- an overview of every card published in the initial print run
- a complete card list
- the various printing styles for rare and ordinary cards

The book contained rules, strategies, color prints of all cards, and also included a rare card from the Unlimited Edition.

== Reception ==
In the October 1995 edition of Dragon (#222), Rick Swan noted that the book provides "everything you want to know" about INWO, and called it a revealing read.
