= Car Wars Expansion Set 9, Muskogee Fairground & Family Emporium =

Car Wars Expansion Set 9, Muskogee Fairground & Family Emporium is a 1986 tabletop game supplement published by Steve Jackson Games for Car Wars.

== Contents ==
Muskogee Fairground & Family Emporium is a supplement in which a sprawling, pre-printed dueling arena is offered, composed of four large sheets, featuring a central octagonal dwelling, helipads, grandstands, and various crash-prone structures. It is a fixed layout designed for expansive scenarios. The scenarios are mostly directional prompts and a heist.

== Reception ==
Tom Zunder reviewed The Muskogee Fairgrounds: Expansion Set 9 for Adventurer magazine and stated that "In assessing this product, I must again say that we used it straight away and found it quick and easy to pick up and fight. Some of the weaponry is new to us, and if you only own Car Wars and Sunday Drivers, as we do, then this could be a bit of a problem. Opinions amongst the playtesters were again mixed, on one hand certainly a good product to use if you want to fight rather than design, and yet it was also felt that designing was one of the best bits of the game. In short, you get a good value, well presented and playable supplement."

== Reviews ==
- Generation 4
