= Combat Showcase =

Combat Showcase is a 1987 tabletop game supplement published by Steve Jackson Games for Car Wars.

== Contents ==
Combat Showcase is a supplement in which 103 ready-to-use vehicle designs—cars, cycles, trikes, and trailers— are compiled and organized by ascending cost for quick selection, styled as a brochure from the 2037 National Fair of Texas. It includes playful in-universe advertisements, game mechanics for accessories, and nods to fictional entities like the Texas Naval Guard and Billy Bob's Algae Emporium. The supplement also features a review of vehicles from the AADA 2036 World Championship and highlights the extravagant Lone Star Limo, personal ride of Texas President Duke Buchanan.

== Reception ==
Tom Zunder reviewed Combat Showcase for Adventurer magazine and stated that "In summary, Muskogee is very much what you make of it. It's a large duelling track and since it would cost you at least £2.50 to buy the gridded paper from a graphics shop (plus the time in drawing it out), is certainly value in financial terms. However, whether you want a huge duelling area must be your choice, since that is alt you get (The 14 scenarios which the cover boasts are actually directions in which to drive and one payroll heist). To give my playtesters as an example, two of us would have bought it, one would have knocked up his own and the other couldn't decide."
