= Double Arena =

Game supplement

Double Arena is a 1984 supplement for the simulation game Car Wars, published by Steve Jackson Games.

== Gameplay ==
Double Arena is a supplement in which two gigantic arenas can be constructed by matching up the two double-sided 21" x 32" mapsheets. The arenas represent the Buffalo Municipal Coliseum in Buffalo, New York and the Dumbarton Slalom Arena in Oakland, California. The supplement also includes 48 counters and an instruction sheet.

== Reception ==
Craig Sheeley reviewed Double Arena in Space Gamer No. 70. Sheeley commented, "Double Arena is a nice switch from the Armadillo A.A., or Midville, or whatever area you've been using. If your arena fighters need a new place to shed blood, or if you want new (and good) counters, or if you love the idea of a slalom, then Double Arena is for you."
