= Electric Crayon =

Electric Crayon was a digital coloring company founded by Steve Buccellato, Marc Siry and Douglas Rosen in 1992. Based in Santa Monica, California, Electric Crayon mainly served the US comic book industry, providing digital color separations for many popular Marvel, DC, and Image titles, including Generation X, Astro City, and the one-shot Batman/Punisher crossover.

Electric Crayon was notable for two reasons:

Although Image Comics and other independent companies (such as Steve Oliff's Olyoptics) had pioneered digital color separations, they were typically focused on special projects or boutique publishers. Electric Crayon attempted to bring the greater detail and color fidelity available through digital separations to mainstream comics, typically known for coarsely screened hand separations.

Electric Crayon was founded shortly after Richard Starking's Comicraft, and occupied the same office building for a time. This led to the creation of new efficiencies in the comic book production process, where the dialogue balloons containing the lettering were composed onto the finished color art. This allowed the lettering work to happen in parallel to the inking, rather than as a serial process, compressing the time necessary to produce a finished digital file for printing.

Electric Crayon operated for slightly over a year as a comic book coloring company. Eventually, the mounting costs of archival hard disk storage and the slow computers of the time made it impractical for the company to scale without either selling to a larger company or raising rates beyond what the market would pay. Buccellato and Siry sold their interest to Rosen and proceeded to form a creative studio, Mad Science Media, focused on content publishing.
