= Illuminati (play-by-mail game) =

Fantasy role-playing game

- Publishers: Adventure Systems, Flying Buffalo
- Years active: 1985 to mid-1990s
- Genres: Intrigue
- Languages: English
- Systems: Computer moderated
- Players: 24
- Playing time: Open-ended
- Materials required: Instructions, order sheets, turn results, paper, pencil
- Media type: Play-by-mail

Illuminati is a computer-moderated play-by-mail game published by Flying Buffalo Inc. It is based on the Illuminati card game by Steve Jackson Games. It was originally owned by Adventure Systems but transitioned to Flying Buffalo Inc in 1986. The game's central focus is on conspiracy and intrigue and involved 24 players playing either by email or by mail in turns processed simultaneously by computer. Illuminati has won the Origins Award for Best Play-By-Mail Game seven times, once in 1985 and six times in the 1990s, and was inducted into the Origins Hall of Fame in 1997.

== Development ==
Illuminati was computer moderated. It was originally owned by Adventure Systems and transitioned to Flying Buffalo Inc in 1986. Flying Buffalo initially ran the game so that turns were processed upon receipt, whereas play-by-mail games were normally processed on a specified date, simultaneously. This gave an advantage to play-by-email (PBEM) over play-by-mail (PBM) players, and after a break in game licensing, Flying Buffalo separated the player types into different games and processed turns simultaneously.

Adventure Systems published in the Jan–Feb 1985 issue of Paper Mayhem that there had been winners in the first five games, providing details of the games themselves. The publisher stated that the first four games were for playtesting and began in February 1985.

Draper Kauffman stated in 1985 that "The strange thing about this game is that it didn't start out as Illuminati", but rather that he "began with the basic concept of a PBM game of world conflict carried out by spies and secret agents, saboteurs and assassins, propagandists and opinion makers, hot money and smuggled arms, popular movements and secret conspiracies."

== Gameplay ==
"I am a teacher and most of the other guests at the party were other teachers, administrators, school psychologists, etc. When the phone call came, I stood in the corner talking about our failed infiltration of the International Cocaine Smugglers, our need to pick up a terrorist group, our power, influence, morale, etc. As I spoke, the room became deathly silent. When I hung up and turned back to the party, I was met with open mouthed stares of disbelief."

—Schoolteacher in Sierra Vista, AZ, on making Illuminati game coordinations at a 1990 work Christmas party.

Illuminati was similar to the Steve Jackson card game of the same name in that players controlled one of various "Illuminated" groups and try to dominate the world. The game's central focus was conspiracy and intrigue.

24 players acted as secret organizations. The game had four phases. The first phase was the "grab" phase where players attempted to control game resources. Players began dropping from the game in this phase. The second phase was the consolidation phase where tensions escalated and diplomacy played a greater role. The third warfare phase was followed by the fourth endgame phase.

According to reviewer Jean Curley, the fundamentals were simple.

Each Illuminated group can control up to 4 other groups, who can (in turn) control from 0 - 4 other groups. The number of groups each can control is determined by the power, influence, and personnel of the group. Each turn, the player is given income money for his group and may spend it as he decides: in attack, defense, or in building up a group. Attacks may be made in an attempt to add a group to your power structure, to remove it from another players structure, or to eliminate it from the game entirely.

== Reception and legacy ==
Robert S. Cushman reviewed Illuminati PBM in Space Gamer No. 72, and stated that "For you card players, prepare to have your conspiracies expanded several-fold, and for you PBMers, get ready to enjoy a really novel game, with lots of amusing quirks." Jean Kurley reviewed Illuminati in the Jan–Feb 1985 issue of Paper Mayhem. Kurley stated that, "Overall, the game plays very well," noting one drawback in "trying to crossreference some of the material in the Question-and-Answer section". Curley added: "This is a game for thinkers and strategists, and for those who enjoy competition. If you like plotting, deception, and conspiracy, then I heartily endorse this game for you."

Illuminati has won the Origins Award a number of times: in 1985, 1990, 1991, 1992, 1993, 1994, and 1995. The game was added to the Origins Hall of Fame in 1997. In the early 1990s, Illuminati placed between 55 and 65 percent in the Paper Mayhem play-by-mail game ratings in which readers ranked games based on playability, design, and product understanding. (Note: For example in the Nov/Dec 1990 issue of Paper Mayhem, Illuminati ranked 40 of 73 games, in the May/June 1991 issue, it ranked 43 of 76, in the Nov/Dec 1992 issue, it was 53 of 83, in the May/June 1993 issue, it was 44 of 76, and in the July/August 1994 issue, it was 44 of 72.)

== See also ==
- List of play-by-mail games
- Power

== Bibliography ==
- "Origins Award Winners (1997)". Academy of Adventure Gaming Arts & Design. Archived from the original on 2008-01-30.
- Adventure Systems (Jan–Feb 1985). "Illuminati PBM". Paper Mayhem. No. 10.
- Adventure Systems (July–August 1986). "Paranoids Beware!". Paper Mayhem. No. 19.
- Cushman, Robert S. (Jan–Feb 1985). "Illuminati PBM Review". Space Gamer. No. 72. Steve Jackson Games. pp. 27–29.
- Flying Buffalo Inc. "Awards Flying Buffalo has Won". Flying Buffalo Inc.
- Gray, Mike (April 1985). "PBM Update: News & Views". Dragon. No. 96. p. 40.
- Kauffman, Draper (Jan–Feb 1985). "Illuminati PBM Designer's Notes". Space Gamer. No. 72. Steve Jackson Games. p. 29.
- Kurley, Jean (Jan–Feb 1985). "Illuminati Play-by-Mail". Paper Mayhem. No. 10.
- Paper Mayhem (November–December 1990). "PBM Game Ratings". Paper Mayhem. No. 44.
- Paper Mayhem (November–December 1992). "PBM Game Ratings". Paper Mayhem. No. 57.
- Paper Mayhem (May–June 1993). "PBM Game Ratings". Paper Mayhem. No. 60.
- Paper Mayhem (July–August 1994). "PBM Game Ratings". Paper Mayhem. No. 44.
- Putnam, Donna (July 1991). "Letters to Flying Buffalo". Flying Buffalo Quarterly. No. 65. p. 4.
- Torkelson, James (1993). "Illuminati Strategy and Tactics". Paper Mayhem. No. 61.
