= Battle Cattle: The Card Game =

Battle Cattle: The Card Game is a card game published by Steve Jackson Games.

== Publication history ==
In 1997, Wingnut Games published a Battle Royale miniatures game called Battle Cattle in which players rolled up statistics for warrior cows armed with weapons, and then engaged each other in combat.

In 2001, Steve Jackson Games published Battle Cattle: The Card Game; the premise of the game remained the same as Battle Cattle, but the combat rules were revised to be identical to those of Car Wars: The Card Game.

== Game play ==
Cards offering offensive and defensive accessories are drawn at random. On the player's turn, the player can use an offensive card to attack another player, who then can respond, if possible, with a defensive card. The last surviving player is the winner.

Because the game mechanics of the card game are based on the same system as Car Wars: The Card Game, players can play a combined game by shuffling the games' two decks together, with some players playing cows and some players playing cars.
