= Sunday Drivers (Car Wars) =

Board wargame supplement

Sunday Drivers is a supplement published by Steve Jackson Games (SJG) in 1982 for the board wargame Car Wars.

== Gameplay ==
Car Wars is a game of heavily armed cars engaged in Mad Max-style combat. Sunday Drivers, loosely inspired by X Marks the Pedwalk, a satirical 1963 Fritz Leiber short story about combat between motorists and pedestrians, is a supplement that presents urban combat in the small town of Midville between warring factions of car duelists, pedestrian defenders, a motorcycle gang, and law enforcement. Sunday Drivers only contains new rules and counters for pedestrians and motorcyclists, as well as a two-piece paper map of the fictional town of Midville. The original Car Wars rules and counters are required to fully play the game.

== Publication history ==
SJG published Car Wars in 1980. It proved popular and SJG followed up with several supplements. In 1982, SJG received a game proposal from Stefan Jones titled Wheels vs. Walkers. Aaron Allston developed Jones's idea into a game titled Sunday Drivers that appeared in the April 1982 issue of The Space Gamer. This supplement was subsequently published as a microgame by SJG, then was re-released the same year as Crash City.

In 1987, Hobby Japan released a Japanese-language edition titled クラッシュ・シティ(Kurasshu shiti).

== Reception ==
In Issue 62 of The Space Gamer, Craig Sheeley commented "Car Wars enthusiasts: If all you want is arena and road combat, don't bother to get Sunday Drivers. However, if you want to go beyond the arena, this game is worth the [money] – and much more".

In Issue 18 of the French games magazine Casus Belli, Martin Latallo noted "The counters provided are superb (especially the bikers) and the Midville map is very pleasant, once unfolded and stiffened." Latallo warned, "Games can last quite a long time, especially if players start far apart, and pedestrians, due to their limited movement capacity, are at a disadvantage."

GeekDad wrote that Sunday Drivers would "allow us to lose the straight streets in lieu of a full-on mini-town, complete with houses, a park, tons of intersections, and if memory serves a police station with cruisers loaded and ready to take on any marauders who might want to add some excitement to the streets of quiet little Midville."
