= Raid on Iran =

1980 board game

Raid on Iran is a 1980 board game published by Steve Jackson Games.

== Gameplay ==
Raid on Iran is a simulation of what might have occurred if the mission to rescue American hostages in Iran had reached Tehran.

== Publication history ==
Steve Jackson Games published three wargames in October 1980, designed as minigames - Raid on Iran, Kung Fu 2100, and One-Page Bulge, and of these Raid on Iran was the best seller due to the Iran Hostage Crisis being recent at the time.

== Reception ==
Bob Von Gruenigen reviewed Raid on Iran in The Space Gamer No. 36. Von Gruenigen commented that "Raid on Iran is an enjoyable game, despite some minor faults. [...] I recommend it anyway."

== Reviews ==
- Adventure Gaming #11
