= Illuminati: New World Order =

Collectible card game

- Both card backs to the Illuminati: New World Order CCG
- Designers: Steve Jackson
- Publishers: Steve Jackson Games
- Years active: 1994–1995
- Players: 2–6
- Playing time: Approx 2 hours
- Chance: Some
- Age range: 12+
- Skills: Card playing; Arithmetic; Basic reading ability

Illuminati: New World Order (INWO) is an out-of-print collectible card game (CCG) that was released in 1994 by Steve Jackson Games, based on their original boxed game Illuminati, which in turn was inspired by the 1975 book The Illuminatus! Trilogy by Robert Anton Wilson and Robert Shea. An OMNI sealed-deck league patterned after the Atlas Games model was also developed.

The 409-card set was sold in packages containing two 55-card starter decks and in 15-card booster packs.The booster packs contained cards of the types 'Group' and 'Plot', but not 'Illuminati'. The INWO Factory Set was a collector's set released in April 1995, containing one of each of the 403 cards in the base set plus blank cards and three of each Illuminati card.

Steve Jackson Games published a 144-page player's guide titled The INWO Book in April 1995 that contained rules, strategies, color prints of all cards, and also included a rare card from the Unlimited Edition.

The limited edition Assassins, the game's first expansion set, was released in mid-1995 and sold in 8-card booster packs. The 100-card expansion set SubGenius was planned for release in August 1997 and ultimately released in April 1998. The Bavarian Fire Drill set was planned for release in November 1998. Both SubGenius and Bavarian Fire Drill were sold as a single-box expansion set with all cards included.

Following the release and popularity of Magic: The Gathering in August 1993, Steve Jackson Games began the development of Illuminati: New World Order, most of which occurred in early 1994. The release of the Deluxe Edition sold out by mid-1994 and was followed by the release of the Limited Edition in December 1994, of which nearly 84,000 sets "sold out almost immediately". The Unlimited Edition was released in 1995. In an article published in the November–December 1994 issue of Pyramid magazine, Steve Jackson stated that Wizards of the Coast had loaned Steve Jackson Games money to "finance the first printing of INWO", which was the biggest project the company had undertaken by an order of magnitude.

== Goal of the game ==
Players attempt to achieve world domination by utilizing the powers of their chosen Illuminati (the Adepts of Hermes, the Bavarian Illuminati, the Bermuda Triangle, the Discordian Society, the Gnomes of Zürich, the Network, Servants of Cthulhu, Shangri-La, the UFOs, the Society of Assassins (added in the Assassins expansion), and the Church of the SubGenius (added in the Subgenius expansion). The first player to control a predetermined number of organizations (usually twelve in a standard game) has achieved the basic goal and can claim victory.

Controllable organizations include groups such as the Men in Black, the CIA, and the Boy Sprouts; personalities such as Diana, Princess of Wales, Saddam Hussein, Ross Perot, or Björne (a parody of Barney the Dinosaur); and places like Japan, California, Canada, and the Moonbase. Many organization names are spoofs of real organizations, presumably altered to avoid lawsuits.

Other ways to achieve victory include: destroying rival Illuminati by capturing or killing the last organization in their power structure; and/or fulfilling a particular goal before your opponent(s) can.

== Card types ==
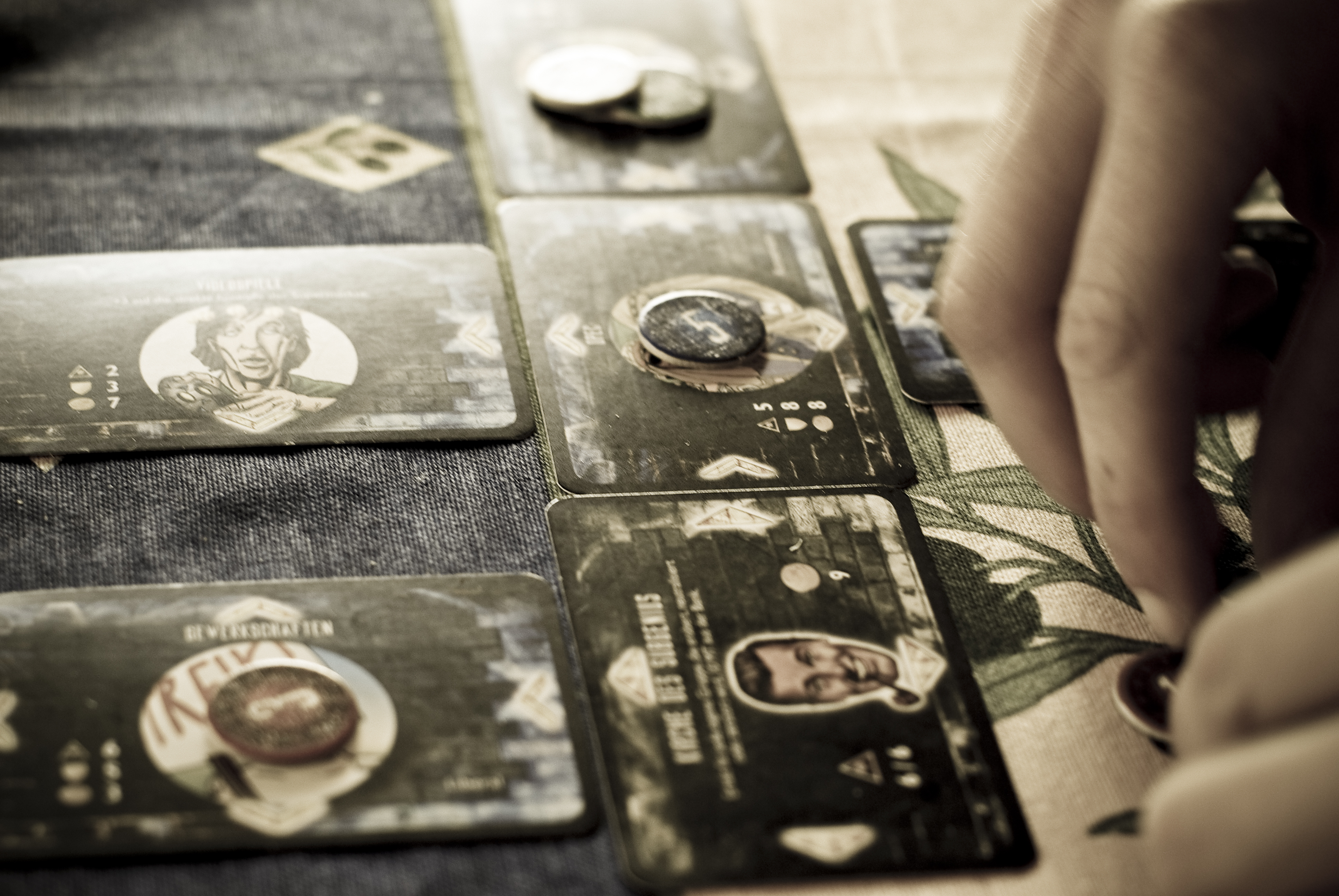
Cards and tokens from the game

Cards come in three main types: Illuminati cards, Plot cards, and Group cards. Illuminati and Plot cards both feature an illustration of a puppeteer's hand in a blue color scheme on the rear side, whereas Group cards feature a puppet on a string in a red color scheme.

Each Illuminati card represents a different Illuminati organization at the center of each player's Power Structure. They have Power, a Special Goal, and an appropriate Special Ability. Their power flows outward into the Groups they control via Control Arrows.

Plot cards provide the bulk of the game's narrative structure, allowing players to go beyond or even break the game's rules as described in the World Domination Handbook. Plot cards are identified by their overall blue color scheme (border and/or title color). Included among the general Plots are several particular types, including Assassinations and Disasters (for delivering insults to the various Personalities and Places in play), GOAL (special goals that can lead to surprise victories), and New World Order cards (a set of conditions that affect all players, typically overridden when replacement New World Order cards are brought into play).

Group cards represent the power elite in charge of the named organization. There are two main types of Groups: Organizations and Resources.

Organizations are identified by their red color scheme (border and/or title). There are three main types of Organizations: regular Organizations, People, and Places. They all feature Power, Resistance, Special Abilities, Alignments, Attributes, and Control Arrows (an inward arrow and 0–3 outward arrows). Like their Illuminati masters, Organizations can launch and defend against various attacks. Provided that the attacking Organization has a free, outward-pointing Control Arrow, players can increase the size of their Power Structure via successful Attacks to Control, a mathematically determined method employed whenever a player wants to capture an Organization from their hand or a rival player's Power Structure. Unless the attack is Privileged (only the target and attacker can be involved), all players can aid or undermine the attack. Attacks to Destroy follow a similar game mechanic but result in the Organization's removal from the Power Structure, after which they are immediately discarded. A dice roll determines the outcome of all Attacks. Other ways to introduce Organizations to the Power Structure involve Plots, spending Action Tokens to bring Groups into play, or using free moves at appropriate times during the play cycle.

Resources represent the custodians of a variety of objects, ranging from gadgets to artefacts (such as The Shroud of Turin, Flying Saucers, and ELIZA). They are identified by their overall purple color scheme (border and/or title). Resources are introduced into play by spending Action Tokens or by using free moves during appropriate moments in the play cycle. They go alongside the Power Structure of the player's Illuminati and bestow a valid Special Ability or something similar.

== Reception ==
In the February 1995 edition of Shadis (issue #17.5), Matthew Lee and Jim Pinto liked the durable cards printed on thicker card stock than the original game (although the cards were easier to crease during shuffling). They also liked that one starter pack was enough for two players to get started and that the rulebook was very detailed. However, they disliked that cards were swapped between players – unusual for a CCG – which meant that the players had to figure out whose cards were whose at the end of the game. They also found that "the large rulebook can be daunting, and a large number of rules must be memorized to play".

In the June 1995 edition of Dragon (issue 218), Rick Swan warned that it was a complex game: "Owing to the unconventional mechanics, even experienced gamers may have trouble at first." But he gave the game a perfect rating of 6 out of 6, saying, "Resolute players who scrutinize the rules and grind their way through a few practice rounds will discover why Illuminati has been so durable. Not only is it an inspired concept, but it’s also an enlightening treatise on the fine art of backstabbing. What more could you ask from a deck of cards?" Ten months later, in the April 1996 edition of Dragon (Issue 229), Swan, tongue in cheek, called a set of blank cards produced for INWO "tastefully understated".

In the September 1996 edition of Arcane (issue 4), Steve Faragher rated the Assassins expansion set 9 out of 10 overall, saying, "With the introduction of Assassins, it now appears to have ... a little more game balance for tournament play. A good thing indeed."

== Reviews ==
- Magia i Miecz (issue 40, April 1997) (Polish)
- Dragão Brasil (issue 6, September 1995) (Portuguese)
- Rollespilsmagasinet Fønix (Danish) (issue 7, March/April 1995)
- The Duelist, October 1998
- Coleção Dragão Brasil

== Awards ==
At the 1995 Origins Awards, INWO won Best Card Game of 1994.

== General references ==
- Jackson, Steve (1995). The INWO Book. Steve Jackson Games Incorporated. ISBN 1-55634-306-X.
- "Illuminati: New World Order". Steve Jackson Games (official website).
