= Battle Cattle =

Board game

Battle Cattle is a light-hearted combat board game published by Wingnut Games in 1997.

== Publication history ==
In 1997, Wingnut Games published a Battle Royale miniatures game called Battle Cattle in which players rolled up statistics for warrior cows armed with weapons, and then engaged each other in combat.

In 2001, Steve Jackson Games turned the miniatures game into a card game called Battle Cattle: The Card Game.

== Gameplay ==
Players first choose a breed of cow from a list, then generate statistics for the cow to determine Health Points, Weight Allowances, and Tipping Defense numbers. Players can then choose offensive and defensive accessories. After combat starts, the last cow remaining is the winner.

== Reception ==
In the January 1997 edition of Dragon (Issue 237), Rick Swan found the game enjoyable, saying, "Despite the udderly stupid premise, it's a credible miniatures game, albeit one that's easy to win if you choose the right accessories."

David Wise for Polyhedron called the game "hilarious" and described the gameplay "in which vicious and malevolent sheep must rightfully be blown to smithereens by the PC (and I definitely don't mean 'politically correct') cattle, armed with cattle-pults, s'cud missiles, udder turrets, steak knives, and other weapons of extreme- prejudicial destruction."

== Reviews ==
- Valkyrie #14 (1997)
- Shadis #32 (1996)
- Backstab (Issue 3 - May/Jun 1997)
