= Globbo =

Science fiction board game published in 1984

Cover of booklet edition

Globbo! is a board game published by Steve Jackson Games (SJG) in 1984 in which a murderous blob tries to eliminate equally murderous blob children.

== Gameplay ==
Globbo! is a two-player game set on the planet Ticketa-Koo in which one player controls Globbo, a giant ameoba-like babysitter armed with blue zap guns and red slapping hands that is programmed so that it will destroy the blob children. The other player controls the blob children that take the form of biters, blips and yeasts. During combat, the attacker rolls a die and attempts to eliminate the defender by getting a number equal to or less than the total strength of the attacker.

The sides of the map "wrap" to their opposite edges — a piece that moves off the right side of the board reappears on the left side of the board. The map also includes some warp holes to move pieces to another part of the board.

== Publication history ==
Globbo, designed by Allen Varney, who also did the artwork, appeared as a free-pull-out game in Issue 62 of SJG's house magazine The Space Gamer. SJG also released the game in booklet form with larger counters and map and two extra rules. In both editions, both the map and the counters were paper sheets that had to be cut apart.

== Reception ==
Russell Grant Collins reviewed Globbo in Space Gamer No. 70. Collins commented that "If you have the magazine version of Globbo, the only things from this version that you're missing are the nifty red printing used for emphasis in the text, a few more Globbo-related illustrations, and two new extras from section IX [...] This may not be enough to convince you to buy the game again, though the larger map and pieces are nice too. If you don't have the magazine game and you enjoy strange games, run (don't walk) to get it."

Mike Lewis reviewed Globbo! for Imagine magazine, and stated that "It is difficult to rate Globbo! as a game; it is fun to play and the rules are extremely funny to read through, but will the humour last or will the game pall after a few plays? However, I don't think the game is designed for anything more than laughs, and it succeeds admirably in its aims."

In Issue 62 of Games, R. Wayne Schmittberger commented, "This science fiction board game could win awards for the funniest rulebook and the most outlandish premise. [...] For all its absurdity, Globbo is a very well designed, highly enjoyable game, requiring interesting and unusual strategies. Though inexpensively produced (the board is paper and the pieces have to be cut apart by hand), this is a quality game that is well worth its bargain price."

In a retrospective review in Issue 24 of Simulacrum, John Kula noted that the game was "Almost all premise. The rules themselves are handwritten and funny." He concluded "The gameplay feels a little dated, a little too wargamey for its subject matter, but not bad at all."
