= Space Station Zulu =

1982 video game

- Publisher: Avalon Hill
- Designer: Dennis Shields
- Programmers: Atari 8-bit Dennis Shields; Apple II; Dennis Milbert
- Artist: Charles Kibler
- Platforms: Apple II, Atari 8-bit, FM-7, PC-8800
- Release: 1982: Atari, Apple; 1984: FM-7, PC-8800
- Genre: Turn-based strategy
- Mode: Single-player

Space Station Zulu is a turn-based strategy game written for the Atari 8-bit computers by Dennis Shields and published by Avalon Hill in 1982. An Apple II port programmed by Dennis Milbert was released the same year. The player manages the defense of a space station which has been infiltrated by alien life forms.

== Gameplay ==
Space Station Zulu is a game in which the player is the Captain of the Space Station Zulu, with a crew of peace loving alien Yargs.

== Reception ==
Hosea Battles, Jr reviewed the game for Computer Gaming World, and stated that "the game is an excellent strategy situation. You won't win the first time, but keep trying."

== See also ==
- The Awful Green Things from Outer Space
