= Autoduel Champions =

Role-playing game supplement

Autoduel Champions is a 1983 game supplement published by Hero Games for Car Wars and Champions.

== Contents ==
Autoduel Champions is a supplement which adapts the Car Wars rules to the Champions and Espionage! role-playing games, adding superheroes to Car Wars using modified Champions skills, and presents aerial combat rules for helicopters.

== Reception ==
Craig Sheeley reviewed Autoduel Champions in Space Gamer No. 66. Sheeley commented that "This supplement has everything you need for helicopters and heroes with either system. Combined with the counters, map, and artwork, it's (pardon the expression) highway robbery for [the price]. I'd expect such a package to cost [more]. If you own Champions, Espionage, or Car Wars, it's more than worth the price."

Marcus L. Rowland reviewed Autoduel Champions for White Dwarf #48, giving it an overall rating of 8 out of 10, and stated that "All in all, I was very favourably impressed by Autoduel Champions – it's packed with useful ideas and devices in all three sections [...] and looks extremely good."

Jerry Epperson reviewed Autoduel Champions in Ares Magazine #17 and commented that "The Autoduel Champions game booklet is a fantastic addition to anyone's Champions game campaign. Those looking for an expansion of the car chase/combat rules should look into this one."

Russell Grant Collins reviewed Autoduel Champions for Different Worlds magazine and stated that "Would I recommend this supplement? It depends. For helicopter rules in Car Wars, yes. For autodueling rules in Champions or Espionage!, yes. A good campaign could be worked out using the stats in section one and doing the driving in regular Car Wars scale, although what to call the resultant system I don't know. For superheroes in Car Wars, though, I can't recommend it unless you add the stat of Endurance."
