= Steve Buccellato =

Freelance artist and self-publisher

- Born: May 1968 (age 58)
- Areas: Writer, Penciller, Inker, Editor, Colourist

Steve Buccellato (born May 1968) is a freelance artist and self-publisher who has worked in the comics industry as a colorist, writer, penciller, and editor.

== Biography ==
Buccellato's work has been published by Marvel Comics, DC Comics, Image Comics, Tokyopop and Tibet House US, among others. He has also published his own work in the magazine Comiculture. His creations include Weasel Guy, which was published by Image Comics in 1999 and Joey Berserk and Claire, which was featured in Comiculture.

He is one of the founding members of Mad Science Media, a collective of comic book professionals.

== Selected bibliography ==
Comics work includes:

- Car Warriors 4-issue mini series (colors)
- New Mutants vol. 1 #96 97 98 (colors)
- New Mutants Annual #5 (colors)
- Man of Peace: The Illustrated Life Story of the Dalai Lama of Tibet, graphic novel, William Meyers, Robert Thurman, Michael G. Burbank, initiated artistically by Rabkar Wangchuk, art a team effort of five artists coordinated by Steve Buccellato and Michael Burbank, Tibet House US, ISBN 978-1941312032
- Spider-Man: Blue (colors)

== Awards ==
He won the Wizard Fan Award for favorite colorist in 1995 (with the firm Electric Crayon).

- Wizard Awards recipients (1995)
