= The Awful Green Things from Outer Space =

Board game

The Awful Green Things From Outer Space
- Pocket Box cover
- Publishers: TSR, Inc.
- Players: 2
- Chance: High (dice rolling)
- Skills: Strategy

The Awful Green Things from Outer Space (AGTFOS) is a two-player space combat board game developed and illustrated by Tom Wham.

== Publication history ==
=== TSR ===
The Awful Green Things from Outer Space was first published as an insert in the July 1979 edition of Dragon magazine (Issue #28). This proved so popular that TSR published a boxed set the following year.

=== Steve Jackson Games ===
After the TSR version went out of print, the rights to the game were subsequently acquired by Steve Jackson Games, which produced a new boxed set in 1989. The game has undergone a number of revisions over the years, and both full-sized and smaller Pocket Box editions exist.

== Theme ==
The spaceship Znutar has become infested with rapidly multiplying space monsters after the crew brings aboard a green rock. One player assumes the role of The Awful Green Things (GT's), the other player controls the ship's crew. The GTs' aim is simple: devour the crew and grow. The crew must destroy the GT's, using hand-to-hand combat and improvised "weapons" made from ordinary objects that will have an unknown effect in combat. If the crew player decides that the cause is hopeless, the crew can activate the ship's self-destruct mechanism and abandon ship. The crew must act quickly, or become overwhelmed by the rapidly breeding menace.

The overall action is inspired by the 1968 science fiction film The Green Slime.

== Rules ==
=== Components ===
The boxed set contains a 16-page rulebook, 151 counters, five green six-sided dice and a 11.5" x 21" game board.

=== Setup ===
Initially, 22 crew members face off against 11 or 12 GT's that range in size from immobile eggs to full adults. The GT's can grow to a maximum complement of 12 adults, 18 babies, 19 eggs and 22 fragments (pieces capable of regenerating). The crew can use weapons but cannot replace losses. The crew is almost always at a considerable disadvantage, owing both to the frequency with which The Awful Green Things grow to replace their losses, and to their own relative frailty.

Each crew member and GT has three statistics: Attack Dice, Constitution and Movement Allowance. All GT's of the same size / growth phase have the same statistics.

The crew player places the crew members in their respective rooms. Most crew members have several rooms to choose from, but must be placed initially in one of these rooms (rather than in an arbitrary starting location). For example, Captain Yid can start in either of the two bridges. Weapons are also placed by the crew player in the appropriate pre-defined locations.

A roll of a die indexed into a table determines the starting number and type of GT’s. Another roll determines where in the ship the first GT is placed; the rest are placed in contiguous spaces, one to each space. GT's may not start in locations where crew members have been placed.

After setup is completed, the crew player must select one member of the crew to move into a location occupied by a GT. This is designated as the initial discovery of the infestation, which raises the alarm, causing the game to start. The Awful Green Things player takes the first turn.

=== Gameplay ===
==== The Awful Green Things player ====
During his or her turn, the GT player can, in this order:

1. Grow, one of: fragments to babies, eggs to babies, babies to adults, or have the adults lay eggs. All non-stunned GT's of the selected growth phase perform this action simultaneously.
2. Move, 2 spaces for adults, 1 space for babies.
3. Attack. Roll the number of attack dice the attackers possess for a target in the same room; the target is killed if its Constitution is exceeded. Killed crew members are eaten for an immediate growth boost.
4. Wake up, if stunned the previous turn.

==== Crew player ====
During the crew player’s turn, he or she can, in this order:

1. Grab weapons. This includes items such as a ray gun, hypodermic, Can of Zgwortz, knife, pool stick, etc.
2. Move, up to four spaces for the swift and as little as one space for Leadfoot the Robot.
3. Attack. The crew can fight with their bare hands or with various tools found throughout the ship. When a weapon is used for the first time, a chit is drawn to determine its effect. The result can range from very powerful (five dice to kill), to bad (growth), to disastrous (multiplication—roll one die to determine the number of fragments produced).
4. Wake up, if stunned the previous turn.

== Weapons ==
During the game, crew members will grab and use various weapons. While the actual action of a given weapon type is randomized for each game, weapons have certain characteristics which always remain the same. This includes things such as the range of the weapon (i.e., how far away it can be used) and whether it is re-usable. Weapons function according to the following table:

Name	# of GT's affected	Range	Collateral damage	Re-usable?
Bottle of Acid	One	One space	None	No
Canister of Zgwortz	One	One space	None	No
Comm. Beamer	All in one space	Line of sight	None	Yes
Fire Extinguisher	All in one space	One space	None	Yes
Gas Grenade	All w/in area enclosed by hatches	One space	5 dice to Stun	No
Hypodermic Needle	One	Same space	None	Yes
Knife	One	Same space OR line of sight	None	Yes OR no (if thrown into another space)
Pool Stick	One	Same space	None	Yes
Rocket Fuel	All w/in area enclosed by hatches	One space	5 dice to Kill	No
Stun Pistol	One	Line of sight	None	Yes
Welding Torch	One	Same space	None	Yes

== Scoring ==
Scores are calculated according to the following table:

Side	Crew annihilated	Ship abandoned	Ship abandoned but self-destruct activated	GT's annihilated
GT's	111	111	55.5	0
Crew	0	Sum of Constitution values of crew which reach home	Sum of Constitution values of crew which reach home	Sum of Constitution values of surviving crew

If the crew escapes, the crew player may play through a short epilogue which determines whether or not each escape boat actually made it back home successfully. This is done by reading through a very short series of text passages, while making choices and rolling a die to determine what happens (much like a gamebook).

== Reception ==
In the January–February 1980 edition of The Space Gamer (Issue No. 26), Steve Jackson liked the original boxed set published by TSR, saying, "If you like slightly-wacky short games, find a copy of this one. You won't regret it."

In the August–September 1980 edition of White Dwarf magazine (Issue 20), John Olsen gave the TSR boxed set game an average score of 7 out of 10, noting that "Unfortunately, luck plays a large part in the outcome." However, Olsen concluded, "I quite enjoyed playing this wild and crazy game."

In the January 1989 edition of Dragon (Issue 141), Jim Bambra reviewed the boxed set produced by Steve Jackson Games in 1989, and concluded, "If you like fun board games, don’t miss this one, or you’ll never forgive yourself."

Three years later, in the December 1991 edition of Dragon (Issue 176), Doug Niles also reviewed the Steve Jackson Games boxed set, calling it "an exercise in whimsy that nonetheless provokes a tense and well-balanced battle for survival. Throughout, the rules retain a storytelling air that makes for enjoyable reading and wild, unpredictable game effects." Niles did criticize the low production values of the game components, calling the board "light and flimsy", and noting that the counters need to be cut apart with scissors. But acknowledging that it was "a wild and woolly game that moves quickly and promises to be different each time it is played", Niles gave a positive recommendation, saying "Despite its silliness, it is a game that rewards a careful and consistent strategy worked out over a period of turns."

John ONeill of Black Gate called the game "one of the great mini-games of all time", noting that it "stood out for its gonzo humor and original design".

In a retrospective review in the August 1999 issue of InQuest Gamer, Charlene Brusso stated that the game "is so simple you could teach it to your grandma...and she'd like it!" and that it resulted in "lots of wacky fun".

== Reviews ==
- Games #19
- 1980 Games 100 in Games
- Games & Puzzles #81
- Jeux & Stratégie #13
- Family Games: The 100 Best

== Legacy ==
Space Station Zulu, a video game closely resembling The Awful Green Things from Outer Space, was published by Avalon Hill in 1982.
