= Undead (board game) =

Undead is a board game published by Steve Jackson Games in 1981.

== Gameplay ==
Undead is a board game for 2–3 players in which one player takes the role of the moderator, one is Dracula, and the other players takes the roles of Professor van Helsing and other vampire hunters.

The hunters must prevent Dracula from spawning more vampires by tracking the movement of coffins at night and investigating them by day.

== Reception ==
In the November 1981 edition of The Space Gamer (Issue 45), David Dyche commented that "All in all, this game is an excellent value."

In the December 1981–January 1982 edition of White Dwarf (Issue 28), Bob McWilliams gave it an above-average overall rating of 8 out of 10, saying, "On the whole this is quite an enjoyable game, probably best played with a number of people and also quite good value for its money."

A retrospective review in the December 1986 edition of Adventurer (Issue 5) recalled the game as "quite absorbing and habit-forming. A tactical skilful game, I would recommend it as a worthwhile game."

In the January 1990 edition of Games International (Issue 12), Kevin Jacklin concluded that "The atmosphere is good, and the play reasonably paced and exciting."
