= Dino Hunt =

Card game

Dino Hunt is a 1996 card game published by Steve Jackson Games.

== Gameplay ==
Dino Hunt is a game in which two to four players focus on educational fun. Set within a time-travel framework, players send teams into prehistoric eras to capture dinosaurs for study and theme park exhibition. Each dinosaur card carries a point value, and players compete to collect the highest total. Dino Hunt has a commitment to scientific accuracy in depicting dinosaurs, earning approval from the Dinosaur Society. Players move their teams through different time zones, roll dice, and use energy points and strategic cards to trap dinosaurs, occasionally thwarted by opponents.

== Publication history ==
Shannon Appelcline noted that by the mid-1990s, "Now firmly back in the board and card game business, SJG began trying out lots of new avenues, including the French design Knightmare Chess (1996), the educational game Dino Hunt (1996) and David Brin's Tribes (1998)."

== Reception ==
Andy Butcher reviewed Dino Hunt for Arcane magazine, rating it a 6 out of 10 overall, and stated that "Dino Hunt is definitely aimed at a younger audience than most of Steve Jackson's releases, and for anyone with children who love dinosaurs it would make a great gift, and one with a little more educational value than most games. The only problem is the cost [...] a lot of money for a game, even one with high quality components like these."

== Reviews ==
- Realms of Fantasy
- The Duelist #16
- Casus Belli #100
- Syfy
