= Power (game) =

Space-based play-by-mail game of intrigue

- Publishers: Entertainment Concepts Inc. (ECI)
- Years active: ~1990 to current
- Genres: Role-playing, science fiction
- Languages: English
- Players: 40
- Playing time: Fixed
- Materials required: Instructions, order sheets, turn results, paper, pencil
- Media type: Play-by-mail or email

Power (also Power+) is a closed-end, computer-moderated, play-by-mail space-based game of intrigue. It was published by Entertainment Concepts Inc. (ECI). By late 1985, an updated version of the game, Power+, had replaced Power. Gameplay involved 40 players vying for rulership of a space empire comprising 35 planets. Players could interact with hundreds of non-player forces including dozens of organization types and individuals. Each turn, players chose from a menu of available actions, many related to intrigue.

== History and development ==
Power was published by Entertainment Concepts Inc. (ECI). The medium complexity game was computer moderated and closed-ended. By late 1985, an updated version of the game, Power+, had replaced Power.

== Gameplay ==
40 players per game vie for rulership of a space empire comprising 35 planets. 585 non-player forces (NPFs) were in play, ranging from military and government organizations to civilian groups and individuals of various types. Victory conditions varied by player. They generally required 16 turns controlling the throne and many NPFs, although eliminating all other players also worked. To be crowned ruler, players required "popularity, wealth, and Senate approval".

NPFs included anti-Government groups, militaries, spies and assassins, guards, churches, courtiers, diplomats, entertainers, mercenaries, reporters, executives, PR men, police, Royal guards and servants, saboteurs, the Secret Service, the Senate, terrorists, and unions.

Players chose up to twenty actions per turn from a menu. These included "investigation, movement, investment, propaganda, hiring NPFs ... slander, theft, blackmail, bribe ... assassination, [and] military combat". The game was in a separate category of games with Illuminati in that "almost everything happens through manipulation of third parties rather than direct physical involvement".

== Reception ==
Bob McLain reviewed the game in a 1984 issue of Gaming Universal, stating, "This is ECI's first attempt at a totally computer moderated game, but they seem to have done an excellent job."

== See also ==
- Illuminati
- List of play-by-mail games

== Bibliography ==
- Coulshed, Mark; Dunne, Bill (Autumn 1985). "Power: Flagship Demonstration Game". Flagship. No. 8. p. 26.
- Dutton, Jim (January–February 1984). "Concepts for Entertainment". Gaming Universal. No. 2. pp. 18–19.
- Editors (Summer 1985). "The Spokesmen Speak...". Flagship. No. 7. p. 29.
- Kelly, John W. (November–December 1985). "An Historic Review of Power". Paper Mayhem. No. 15. p. 21.
- Maddox, Raymond (Autumn 1985). "Powermonger". Flagship. No. 8. p. 26.
- McLain, Bob (January–February 1984). "Gamealog: Power". Gaming Universal. No. 2. p. 44.
- Palmer, Nicky (Autumn 1985). "The Battle for Influence". Flagship. No. 8. p. 27.
- Safigan, Steve; Palmer, Nicky; Coulshed, Mark; Robertson, Bruce; Vallance, William (Summer 1985). "Power: Flagship Demonstration Game". Flagship. No. 7. pp. 18–19.
