= Zombie Dice =

Dice game

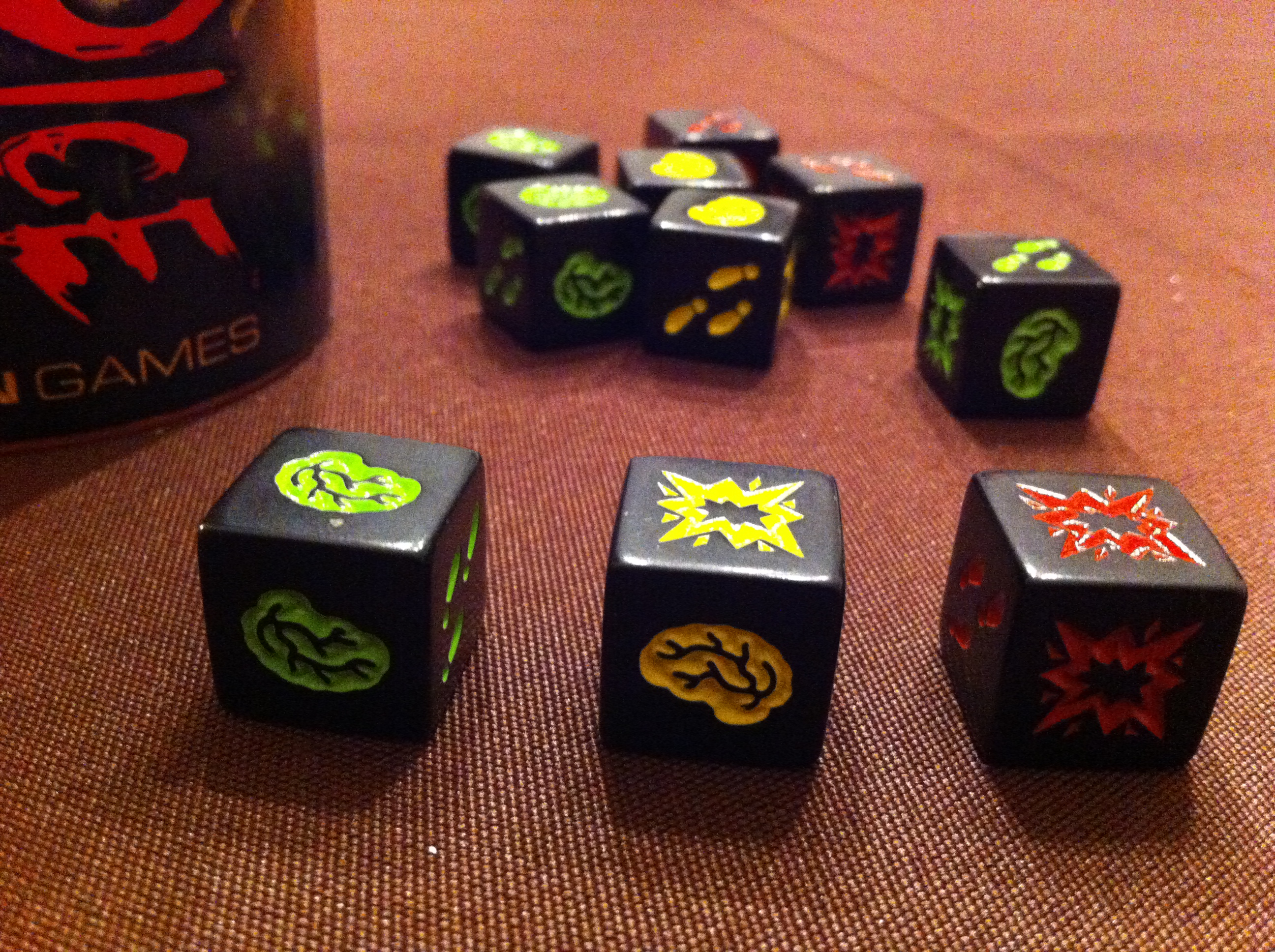
- Zombie Dice in action
- Designers: Steve Jackson
- Publishers: Steve Jackson Games
- Players: 2–8
- Playing time: 10–20 minutes (average)
- Chance: Medium (dice rolling)

Zombie Dice is a "press your luck" party dice game created by Steve Jackson Games and released in 2010. A digital app version of the game has also been released.

== Gameplay ==
The gameplay of Zombie Dice is simple. The player has to shake a cup containing 13 dice and randomly select 3 of them without looking into the cup and then roll them. The faces of each die represent brains, shotgun blasts or "runners" with different colours containing a different distribution of faces (the 6 green dice have 3 brains, 1 shotgun and 2 runners, the 4 yellow dice have 2 of each and the 3 red dice have 1 brain, 3 shotguns and 2 runners). The object of the game is to roll 13 brains. If a player rolls 3 shotgun blasts their turn ends and they lose the brains they have accumulated so far that turn. It is possible for a player to roll 3 blasts in a single roll, but if only one or two blasts have been rolled the player will have to decide whether it is worth it to risk rolling again or "bank" the brains acquired so far and pass play to the next player. A "runner" is represented by feet and rolling a runner means that the player can roll that same dice if they choose to press their luck. A winner is determined if a player rolls 13 brains and all other players have taken at least one more turn without reaching 13 brains.

== Awards ==
Zombie Dice was the winner of the 2011 Origins Awards for a Family, Children's or Party game.

== Expansions ==
Zombie Dice 2: Double Feature is an expansion released in 2012. Three new dice are included, replacing three of the dice from the original: the Hunk, the Hottie, and Santa Claus. Each has its own unique abilities. The Hunk die has a double shotgun and a double brain, the Hottie has extra feet, and Santa Claus has three special gifts: a helmet (to let one take an additional shotgun blast), an energy drink (to capture the brain of a runner), and a double brain.

Zombie Dice 3: School Bus comes with one yellow 12-sided die that represents a school bus with many young brains. Different sides include one side with three brains, and one with two brains and a shotgun blast.

Zombie Dice: Horde Edition is a boxed edition of the game including the original base game, as well as the Double Feature and School Bus expansions. Replacing the dice cup in this edition is a cloth bag.

== Reception ==
A board game review in The Wirecutter stated that the game is easy to learn and quick to play, but that it was a simple game that did not hold a player's attention for long.
