= Dragon Magic (module) =

Tabletop role-playing game supplement

- Code: DLE2
- Authors: Rick Swan
- First published: 1989

Dragon Magic is an adventure module published by TSR in 1989 for the Dungeons & Dragons fantasy role-playing game, specifically the Dragonlance campaign setting.

== Plot summary ==
Dragon Magic is a Dragonlance adventure scenario where the player characters journey to a cloud city, get sent to Krynn's moon of Lunitari, and will need to stop the killing of the Celestial Dragon of Neutrality.

== Publication history ==
The popularity of the Dragonlance campaign setting, fuelled by the Dragonlance line of novels by Tracy Hickman and Margaret Weis, resulted in the publication of sixteen modules in the original DL series for Advanced Dungeons & Dragons between 1984 and 1988. When TSR released the second edition of AD&D in 1989, the Dragonlance campaign was updated as well with the release of the three DLE modules written by Rick Swan. DLE2 Dragon Magic, the second in the series, was a 64-page booklet with a large color map and an outer folder, and cover art by Jeff Easley.

== Reception ==
In the September–October 1989 edition of Games International (Issue 9), Mike Jarvis thought there was nothing ground-breaking about the novel, commenting that it was "hardly setting new standards for fantasy adventures." However, he did feel "it is an enjoyable enough romp through the planes." He complimented the presentation of the module, but wondered why new monsters were not illustrated. He also was disappointed that players were expected to use pre-generated characters rather than their own player characters. Jarvis gave the module an average rating of 3 out of 5, saying, "While not indispensable, you could do far worse if you are looking for a couple of evenings' adventure."
