= Illuminati (game) =

Card game

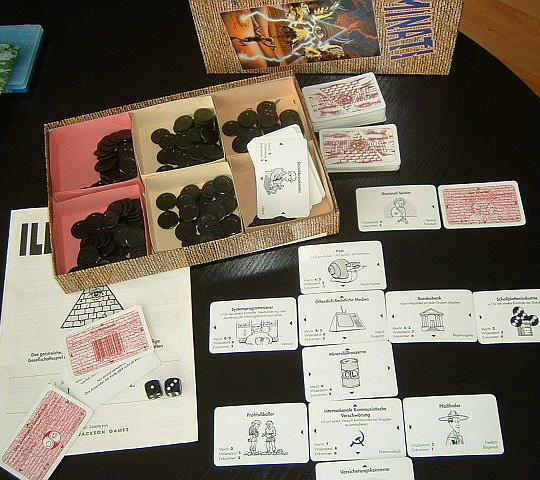
- German Illuminati game components
- Designers: Steve Jackson
- Publishers: Steve Jackson Games
- Players: 2–8 (4–6 recommended)
- Setup time: 1–5 minutes
- Playing time: 1 to 6 hours
- Chance: Medium
- Skills: Strategic thought, deal making, bluffing

Illuminati is a card game made by Steve Jackson Games (SJG), inspired by the 1975 book series The Illuminatus! Trilogy by Robert Anton Wilson and Robert Shea. The game has ominous secret societies competing with each other to control the world through various means, including legal, illegal, and even mystical. It was designed as a "tongue-in-cheek rather than serious" take on conspiracy theories. It contains groups named similarly to real-world organizations, such as the Society for Creative Anachronism and the Symbionese Liberation Army. It can be played by two to eight players. Depending on the number of players, a game can take between one and six hours.

== Origins ==
In September 1981, Steve Jackson and his regular freelance cover artist Dave Martin discussed their shared admiration of Robert Shea and Robert Anton Wilson's Illuminatus! Trilogy. The latter suggested a game. Steve Jackson decided against adapting the novel because of the expense of game rights, and the difficulty of adapting a novel with such a convoluted plot. He decided "a game about the secret-conspiracy idea behind Illuminatus!" was viable. After researching the Illuminati and conspiracy theories, and "extensive and enthusiastic playtesting" it went on the market in July 1982 in the (at the time) usual SJG Pocket Box format. Over the next few years, three expansions for the Pocket Box Illuminati game were published. The first two were substantially incorporated into the deluxe edition, while the third was a version of what would become Illuminati: Brainwash.

Co-author Shea provided a four-paragraph introduction to the rulebook for the Illuminati Expansion Set 1 (1983), in which he wrote, "Maybe the Illuminati are behind this game. They must be—they are, by definition, behind everything."

Without specifically naming the card game, in 2001, the trilogy's co-author Wilson criticized some products for exploiting the Illuminatus! name without paying royalties by taking advantage of legal loopholes. Later commentators have attributed both the game and the Illuminatus! Trilogy as using real conspiracies as "targets of ridicule."

The related Steve Jackson Games supplement GURPS Illuminati University does not mention the trilogy (or related works by Wilson) in its list of inspirational works.

== Description ==
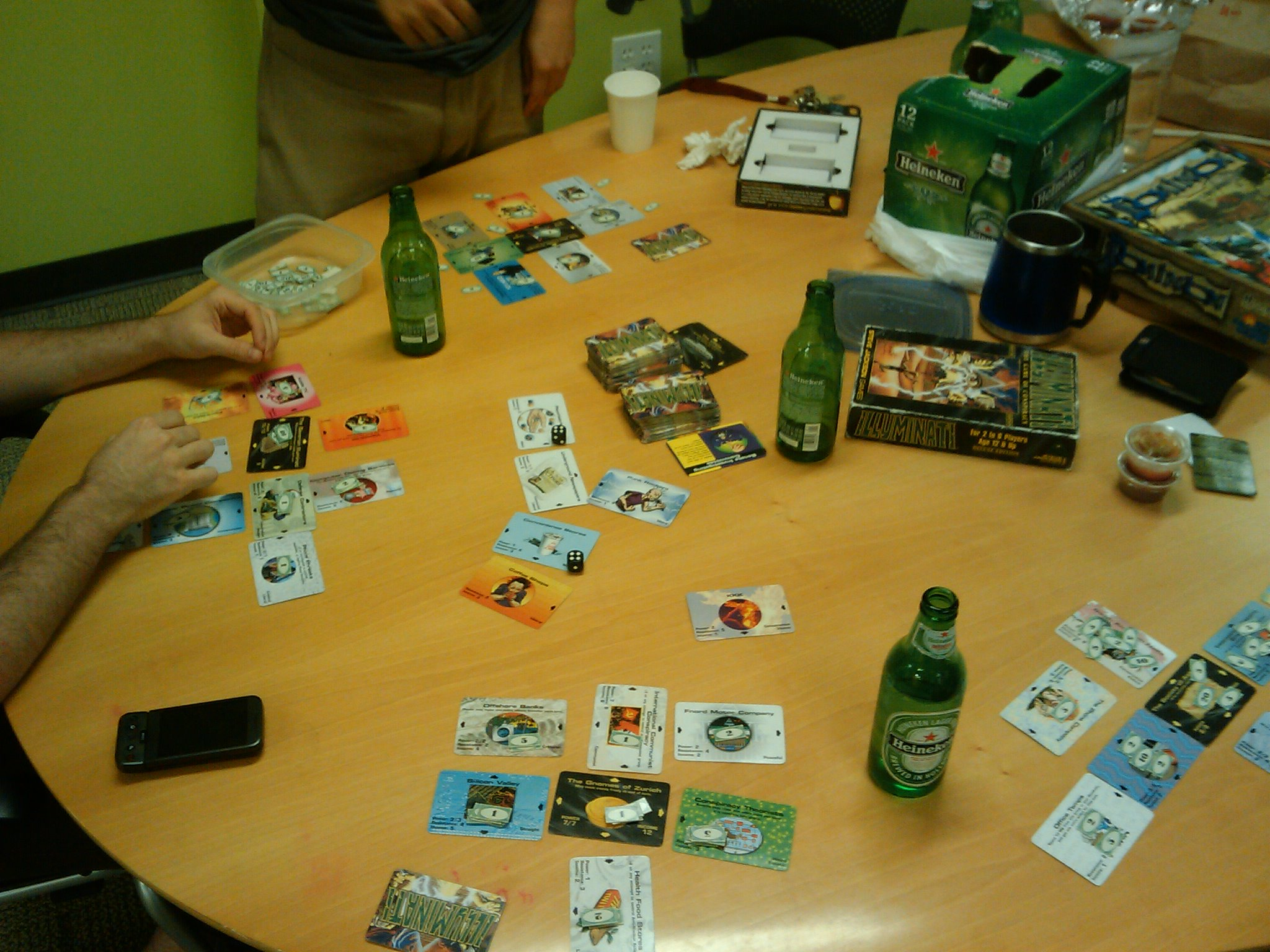
A game of Illuminati in progress

The game is played with a deck of special cards, money chips (representing "millions of dollars in low-denomination unmarked banknotes") and two six-sided dice. There are three types of cards:

- Illuminati
- Groups
- Special cards

The players take role of Illuminati societies that struggle to take over the world. The Pocket Box edition depicted six Illuminati groups: The Bavarian Illuminati, The Discordian Society, The UFOs, The Servants of Cthulhu, The Bermuda Triangle, and The Gnomes of Zürich. The deluxe edition added the Society of Assassins and The Network, and the Illuminati Y2K expansion added the Church of The SubGenius and Shangri-La. The aim of the game is fulfilled when Illuminati build a power structure consisting of given number of cards (dependent on number of players), or when Illuminati fulfill its special goal, (such as controlling at least one card of each alignment for the Bermuda Triangle).

The world is represented by group cards such as Secret Masters of Fandom, the CIA, The International Communist Conspiracy, Evil Geniuses for a Better Tomorrow, California, and many more – there are over 300 official cards available. Every group and Illuminati has some Power, Resistance and Income values; most of the world groups have an Alignment. The game is written with the usual SJG humor. The game uses a multitude of conspiracy theory in-jokes, with cards such as the Boy Sprouts (where sinister youth leaders influence the world leaders of tomorrow), the Orbital Mind Control Lasers, the Mafia, two headed Anti-Nuclear Activists, or Trekkies. Special cards represent unexpected phenomena and features, for example increasing Income or Resistance of a group. A "Second Edition" was released in 2018 featuring some updated groups that reference more recent popular culture and events.

The game is played in turns. The primary Illuminati (player) activity is taking control of groups. Other types of attacks are attacks to neutralize (removing from Illuminati power structure and returning to the table - to the world) and attack to destroy (removing from the game). Besides attacking groups the players can trade, form alliances, and many other activities. Tactics such as playing opponents off each other, backstabbing and concealing your true motives are encouraged in this game. In one variant of the game, players are allowed to cheat, steal money from the table and do anything it takes to win.

During an attack to take control, the attacker must overcome the Resistance of attacked groups with combined Power of his groups (affected by Alignment of attacker and attacked), money spent, and influence of special cards. The attacked group can be defended by spending money and special cards by other players (especially by a controlling Illuminati). After a successful attack to take control, the card is placed (along the special markers) next to Illuminati, or another already controlled group forming a power structure.

Each group has its own money, marked by money counters on that group. Most groups have an income collected at the beginning of each turn; money can also be moved one step at a time between groups once per turn. Money in the Illuminati group is accessible for defense of or attacks on all groups in the entire world. Money in the groups can only be used by that group, but gives double defense bonus when spent in defense.

Although the game can support two to ten players, a group of four or five is considered ideal. Some Illuminati might seem unbalanced, such as the high-income Gnomes and the low-level Discordians, but sometimes their true value is not visible at first or valuable only in certain circumstances. Planning the power structure is important, since groups close to the Illuminated core have a defense bonus. Also, groups can "block" each other's control arrows, through which groups control other groups. The flow of money is important, as a large lump of it will boost the offense / defense of the owning group.

== Expansions ==
Available expansion sets are: Illuminati Mutual Assured Distraction (2010); Illuminati Bavarian Fire Drill (2007); Illuminati Y2K (1999); Illuminati Brainwash (1985).

== Related games ==
Steve Jackson Games released a collectible card game version called Illuminati: New World Order (1994) and a stand-alone version called Illuminati: Crime Lords (2004), where the players control mobs in attempt to take over a city. SJG developed some Illuminated role-playing game modules for its GURPS system, including GURPS Illuminati (1992), GURPS Illuminati University (1995), and GURPS Warehouse 23.

SJG also released Hacker (1992) which is similar to the original Illuminati (modulo terminology), but the players fight for the control of computer networks. It is more loose, and based primarily on interlocking access to different computer systems in the web. Players are not set directly towards each other, and several players can share access to a system.

Adventure Systems created a Play-by-mail game (PBM) Illuminati game, based on and licensed from the Steve Jackson game, with many modifications. The game was eventually purchased, and is now run, by Flying Buffalo. The designer, Draper Kauffman, had been trying to develop a "global strategy game" for many years when he received a copy of Illuminati. Recalling the creation of the PBM version, Kauffman wrote, "It wasn't long before I found that every problem in my own game design had a suspiciously similar solution: 'Hey, how about if we just handle that like they did in Illuminati?"

== Reception ==
In Issue 22 of Abyss, Jon Schuller thought that "where it really falls down is in the lack of variety ... After playing a number of times, Illuminati loses its luster, because it tends to be too much the same." \ Schuller concluded, "Illuminati has good ideas and is fun to play. The price is a bit high for the amount of play you will want to do." Two issues later, Schuller reviewed the first two expansion sets and wrote, "These expansions are definitely needed and make Illuminati a much more enjoyable game."

Robert Goldberg, writing in Issue 36 of Games, commented, "Obviously, this is a game for people who love conspiracy theories—you can prove the oil companies really do run the C.I.A. Its other virtues are that it is relatively simple to learn, inexpensive, and quite uncluttered (there is no board, just cards and some rather cheaply designed money) "

In Issue 53 the British wargaming magazine Perfidious Albion, Charles Vasey commented, "It is a game of threats, bribes, underhand deals, lies, and treachery - some of us think life's a little like that. If that sounds the sort of thing you are interested in, with the chance of world domination thrown in as an added bonus, then don't delay - Illuminati is the game for you."

In Issue 40 of the British games magazine White Dwarf (April 1983), Phil Masters stated that "Overall, this is a playable game with a good element of skill; it creates an appropriate atmosphere of conspiracy and cynicism, although the open hands system rather removes the element of paranoid secrecy inherent in conspiracy theories." Masters concluded by giving the game a rating of 7 out of 10, writing, "Illuminati will earn its devotees, especially in America, although it lacks the elegance of the best cult games." Four issues later, Masters reviewed Expansion Sets 1 & 2 and gave them a rating of 6 out of 10, commenting, "the concept is certain to appeal to anyone with a pet dislike or a shred of cheap cynicism."

In the December 1983 issue of Asimov's Science Fiction, Dana Lombardy noted, "Illuminati is fun, fast-playing, and funny. If you have a paranoid friend, it’s the perfect gift."

In the December 1983 edition of Dragon, Michael Lowrey believed that Steve Jackson Games had "a definite potential classic here, and one which, properly marketed, could appeal to folks who will never play a wargame in their lives". However Lowrey thought the two expansion sets were overly expensive, and advised consumers to see how they liked the basic game before buying the expansion sets. Ten years later, Allen Varney called it "a brilliant card-and-token game." He concluded, "Ingenious and satirical, the Illuminati game fosters good-humored paranoia and dramatic struggles."

In Space Gamer No. 68, Dave Nalle thought that the two expansions sets "are excellent but high-priced expansions to a good and popular game. Before buying them and shelling out [the cash], you will probably want to pause to consider how much you will be using them, and as long as you play fairly frequently, the price may be worth the use you'll get." Several issues later, Kevin Ross gave the Illuminati Expansion Set 3 a positive review, saying, "If you want some great new wrinkles for your Illuminati game, you definitely need this supplement. The rules make for a longer but much more enjoyable game. And don't let the lack of a Pocket Box or the thinness of the package fool you. There's a lot here for [the price]."

In Issue 3 of the French games magazine Jeux & Stratégie, Pierre Grumberg commented, "Funny, simple, and full of strategic and diplomatic twists and turns, Illuminati is a thrilling struggle. To win, you'll need to strike a delicate balance between all-out attacks (which weaken your position) and carefully reinforcing your network." Grumberg's only complaint was "the tokens: They're rather ugly and hard to read." But otherwise, Grumberg liked the game, giving it a rating of 4 out of 5 and concluding, "Luck plays just enough of a role to spice up the game, which never drags on. Calculations during attacks are the only 'tedious' part of the game."

In 2007, almost 25 years after its original publication, Illuminati was chosen for inclusion in the book Hobby Games: The 100 Best. Scott Haring wrote that Illuminati is "too much fun and has too much replay value to fade away on its own. Indeed, 25 years after its initial release, Illuminati is still immensely popular, having spawned multiple editions, three expansion sets, Steve Jackson Games' corporate logo, a spinoff collectible card game that is still the single biggest-selling product line in SJ Games history, and — my favorite — a complete set of color-coded pins that identified Illuminati members and their specialty."

=== Awards ===
- 1982: Illuminati won the Origins Award for "Best Science Fiction Boardgame".
- 1992: GURPS Illuminati won the Origins Award for "Best Roleplaying Supplement".
- 1994: Illuminati: New World Order won the Origins Award for "Best Card Game".
- 1985: Illuminati PBM won the Origins Award for "Best Play-by-Mail Game".
- 1990–1994:Illuminati PBM won the Origins Award for "Best Play-by-Mail Game"
- 1995: Illuminati PBM tied with Middle-Earth Play-By-Mail for the Origins Award in the category "Best Play-by-Mail Game".
- 1997: Illuminati PBM was inducted into the Origins Awards Hall of Fame.

== Sources ==
- Jackson, Steve (1982). "The Truth Behind ILLUMINATI". Adventure Gaming. 2 (3): 11–13.
- Kauffman, Draper (1985). "Illuminati PBM Designer's Notes". Space Gamer. 72: 29.
- Award Winners - Origins International Game Expo
