= Star Traders =

Star Traders is a 1987 board game published by Steve Jackson Games.

== Gameplay ==
Star Traders is a game in which players are merchants jumping between planets on increasingly difficult routes to deliver cargo, earning money and Prestige, and building bases that grant travel advantages and lucrative control over key worlds.

== Reviews ==
- Abyss #43 (Spring, 1989)
- Analog Science Fiction and Fact
- Dragon #200
- 321 Contact
- Games #87 - top 100 games of the year
