= Kung Fu 2100 =

Board game

Cover art by Denis Loubet, 1980

Kung Fu 2100 is a board game published by Steve Jackson Games in 1980 that simulates martial arts combat.

== Description ==
Kung Fu 2100 is a martial arts microgame about combat that takes place in a future setting. In a world ruled by the evil CloneMaster, Terminators have been trained in martial arts to end the CloneMaster's reign. One player controls the Terminators, the other controls the CloneMaster and his minions.

=== Components ===
The microgame box contains

- 10" x 21" map of the CloneMaster's fortress
- rules
- combat results table (CRT) and damage record sheet
- thin cardstock counters

=== Setup ===
The CloneMaster player places all of the CloneMaster's minions on the map facedown.

=== Gameplay ===
Three scenarios are included with the game, including a solitaire game. In each scenario, three Terminators enter the fortress. Each turn consists of Terminator movement, attack and movement, followed by CloneMaster movement and attack.

==== Combat ====
In combat, the Terminator player picks three skill counters and his opponent picks two. Each player puts down one counter, the attacker rolls a six-sided die, and the CRT is checked for that combination. Now the Clonemaster's first defensive counter becomes the CloneMaster's first attack. The Terminator places a second counter as a defense. The Clonemaster rolls a die, the CRT is consulted. Attack and defense are switched again, and combat continues.

=== Victory conditions ===
Whoever is the last man standing is the winner.

== Publication history ==
In the late 1970s, a piece of art was published in The Space Gamer and readers were asked to create a story or game about the drawing. Game designer Dennis Sustare, who had designed the role-playing game Bunnies and Burrows, developed both a story and the game Kung Fu 2100, which were both subsequently published in Issue 30 of The Space Gamer (August 1980). Steve Jackson Games then published the game as a microgame in 1980, with cover art by Dennis Loubet.

Steve Jackson Games published three wargames in October 1980, designed as minigames - Raid on Iran, Kung Fu 2100, and One-Page Bulge, and of these Raid on Iran was the best seller due to the Iran Hostage Crisis being recent at the time.

== Reception ==
Adam Strock reviewed Kung Fu 2100 in The Space Gamer No. 44. Strock commented that "Despite its flaws, Kung Fu 2100 is a good game. Kung Fu fighters and aspiring 'grasshoppers' will love it. Everyone else will probably like it."

In Issue 30 of Phoenix, Paul King liked the game and thought the use of counters in the martial arts combat was creative. He concluded, "This is a game you will either enjoy or find entirely not to your taste – in fact the rules begin with 'Warning: This is a game, not a simulation. Serious minded folk read further at your own risk!' So be warned, you should only play this game for kicks!"
