= Cthulhu Dice =

2010 dice game

Cthulhu Dice is a dice game released in 2010 by Steve Jackson Games. It is recommended for 2-6 players, and the play time can be anywhere from 5–10 minutes. The game includes a 12 sided die, 18 glass marbles, and a set of rules. Each player rolls the die to compete with other players to be the last sane person left.

== Rules ==
Each player takes three glass marbles to represent sanity, and the rest of the tokens are set aside. A person will cast the die, rolling it against another player, causing him/her to lose or gain sanity.

== Signs ==
Cthulhu Dice uses many signs on the custom die that represent moves of the players. The signs are: Yellow Sign, Tentacle, Elder Sign, Cthulhu or an Eye of Horus. The signs used in Cthulhu Dice are famous glyphs from H. P. Lovecraft's Cthulhu Mythos.

== See also ==
- Game design
