= Autoduel Quarterly =

Magazine for the Car Wars tabletop game

- Editor: Scott Haring
- First issue: 1983; 43 years ago
- Final issue Number: 1992; 34 years ago 40
- Company: Steve Jackson Games
- Country: US

Autoduel Quarterly was a magazine published by Steve Jackson Games beginning in 1983.

== Contents ==
Autoduel Quarterly was a magazine that included supplementary material meant to be used with the game Car Wars. Steve Jackson Games moved the material for Car Wars from The Space Gamer to Autoduel Quarterly beginning in 1983; the editor for the new magazine was Car Wars line editor Scott Haring. When the company stopped publishing Space Gamer, its last remaining magazine was Autoduel Quarterly, which had a circulation of 12,000 at the time, and the company continued publishing it quarterly through 1992 for a total of 40 issues.

== Reception ==
Ronald Pehr reviewed Autoduel Quarterly in Space Gamer No. 67. Pehr commented that "How good is Autoduel Quarterly? Well, I'm not running a Car Wars campaign right now and I loved it – and I'll buy the next issue."

GeekDad wrote that Autoduel Quarterly had "One nice touch was that each issue was shipped with a protective white cover around it. These covers typically had an entertaining cartoon on the front while on the inside was either an order form, a game nomination form for the yearly Origin game gathering, and other odds and ends."

== Reviews ==
- Imagine #11
