= GeekDad =

American website for fathers who categorize themselves as geeks

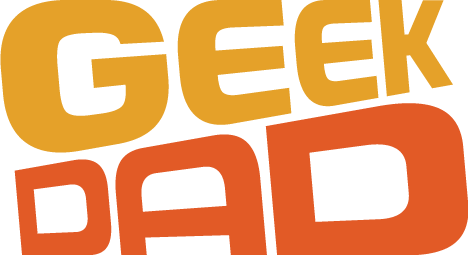
- Website type: Technology news & information
- Available in: English
- Founded: March 15, 2007; 19 years ago in Windsor, California, United States
- Headquarters: 3585 Sutton Loop, Fremont, California, {{{location_country}}}
- Country of origin: United States
- Owner: Ken Denmead
- Creator: Ken Denmead
- Founder: Chris Anderson
- Industry: Parenting; Blogging; Geek culture; Gaming
- Products: Apparel; Audio gear; Gadgets; Gift guide; Kickstarter; Reviews; Toys
- Revenue: ▼$7.5 million USD (2009)
- Employees: 25 (2009)
- Website: geekdad.com
- Commercial: Yes
- Registration: No
- Current status: Active
- Native client on: Web browser

GeekDad is a website covering multiple topics targeting fathers who categorize themselves as a "geek." Popular categories include Lego, Star Wars & Star Trek, video games, books, and field trips. GeekDad also publishes a regular podcast covering items of interest to the website's readers. The GeekDad blog was named one of the top ten best-written blogs for its in-depth explanations of difficult and intricate topics.

== History ==
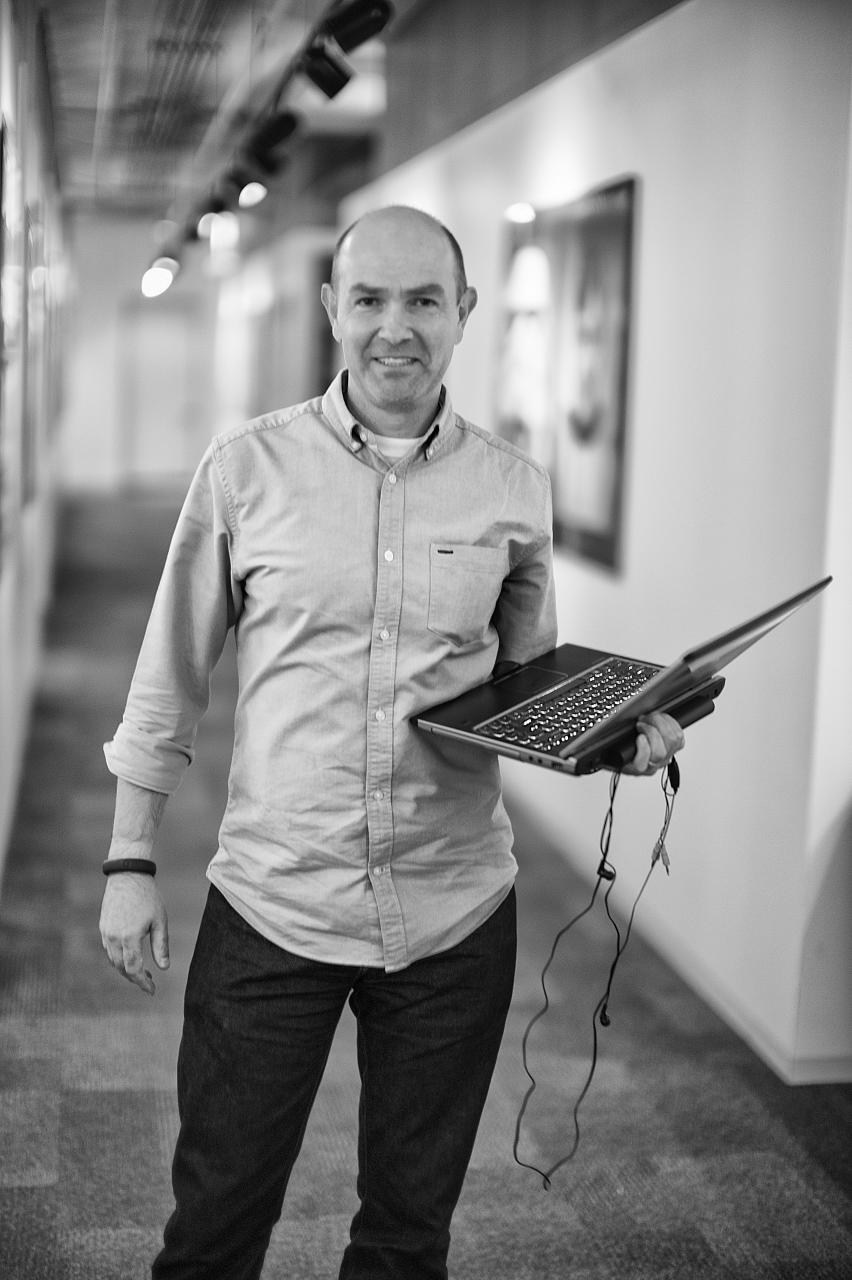
Chris Anderson, founder and Editor (Emeritus) of GeekDad.

GeekDad was started on March 15, 2007 by Wired editor Chris Anderson. Anderson was inspired by a weekend of fun and adventure when his love for R/C planes and his son's love for Lego came together and they built and programmed a UAV driven by the Lego Mindstorms NXT. Wanting to share this experience with other geek dads, he bought the geekdad.com domain, then set up a Wired blog. As readership grew, he realized he needed some help and sent out a call for writers. Anderson brought Ken Denmead on board to serve as the GeekDad leader. Denmead then brought on more writers.

In 2009, the GeekDad brand expanded to include clothing by offering a GeekDad T-Shirt through ThinkGeek, an online retailer.

The first GeekDad book, Geek Dad: Awesomely Geeky Projects and Activities for Dads and Kids to Share, written by Denmead, was released May 4, 2010. The second GeekDad book, GeekDad's Guide to Weekend Fun, was released on May 3, 2011.

On June 28, 2010, GeekDad was named one of the 25 "Best Blogs of 2010" by Time magazine.

In April 2013, GeekDad left Wired because of a contract dispute with Conde-Nast, Wired's parent company. In April 2015, GeekDad announced that they had settled the contract dispute over legal ownership of the GeekDad brand name and would remain an independent blog.

== GeekMom ==
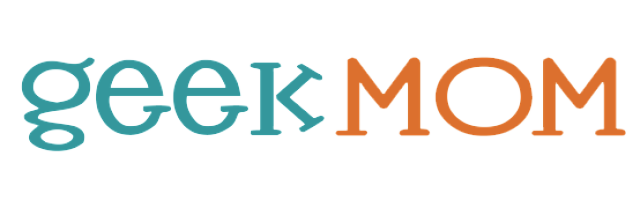

GeekMom is a companion site for GeekDad that was created by Ken Denmead and the women GeekDad writers, Natania Barron, Kathy Ceceri, Corrina Lawson, and Jenny Bristol (then Jenny Williams). GeekMom was also featured on Wired and a Geek Mom book was published by Potter Crafts in 2012. GeekMom left Wired at the same time as the GeekDad site. In addition to its Founding Editors, GeekMom featured contributions from Kari Byron.

== Awards ==
| Year | Nominee / work | Award | Result |
|---|---|---|---|
| 2012 | GeekDad | Webby | Won |
| 2013 | GeekDad | Webby | Lost |
| 2013 | GeekMom | Webby | Lost |
