= Steve Jackson Games =

American game publishing company

- Type: Private
- Industry: Game publisher
- Founded: 1980
- Founder: Steve Jackson
- Headquarters: Austin, Texas, United States
- Key people: Steve Jackson
- Products: Munchkin, Chez Geek, Car Wars, Ogre, GURPS
- Revenue: US$3.5 million gross (2023)
- Owner: Steve Jackson
- Number of employees: 43 full time (2015)
- Website: www.sjgames.com

Steve Jackson Games (SJGames) is a game company, founded in 1980 by Steve Jackson, that creates and publishes role-playing, board, and card games, and (until 2019) the gaming magazine Pyramid.

== History ==
Founded in 1980, six years after the creation of Dungeons & Dragons, SJ Games created several role-playing and strategy games with science fiction themes. SJ Games' early titles were microgames initially sold in 4×7 inch Ziploc bags, and later in the similarly sized Pocket Box. Games such as Ogre, Car Wars, Illuminati, and G.E.V. (an Ogre spin-off) were popular during SJ Games' early years. Game designers such as Loren Wiseman and Jonathan Leistiko have worked for Steve Jackson Games.

In April–May 2012, Steve Jackson Games ran a successful Kickstarter campaign for a new "Designer's Edition" of Ogre. In April 2014, game designer Phil Reed became CEO of the company. In 2023, Reed stepped down, citing concerns about his health and personal life. Meredith Placko, previously CEO of paint company Turbo Dork, took his place. In April 2025, Placko announced she would resign her position and go back to Turbo Dork as its CEO.

=== Raid by the Secret Service ===
On March 1, 1990, the Secret Service raided the offices of Steve Jackson Games, seizing three computers, two laser printers, dozens of floppy disks, and the master copy of GURPS Cyberpunk; a genre toolkit for cyberpunk games, written by Loyd Blankenship, an employee at the time. The Secret Service believed that Blankenship had illegally accessed Bell South systems, and uploaded a document possibly affecting 9-1-1 systems onto Steve Jackson Games's public bulletin board system or another board known as Phoenix which he also administered; and, furthermore, that GURPS Cyberpunk would help others commit computer crimes. During their investigation, the Secret Service also read (and deleted) private emails on one of the computers. Though the materials were later returned in June, Steve Jackson Games filed suit in federal court, winning at trial.

The raid led to the formation of the Electronic Frontier Foundation, which was founded in July 1990.

== Games published ==
Steve Jackson Games' main product line, in terms of sales, is the Munchkin card game, followed by the role-playing system GURPS.

=== Card games ===
- Battle Cattle: The Card Game, a card game, compatible with the Car Wars card game, based on the Battle Cattle miniatures system.
- Burn in Hell, a semi-satirical game centered on collecting 'circles' of notable historical and contemporary people's (sinners') souls that share common characteristics.
- Car Wars: The Card Game, a card game version of the Car Wars miniatures system.
- Chez Geek, a card-game parody of Geek culture with many spinoffs and expansions.
- Cowpoker, a card game partly based on poker mechanics with a central theme of old west cattle ranchers.
- Dino Hunt, a card game where players travel through time to capture dinosaurs. Features over a hundred dinosaurs with color drawings and accurate scientific data on each one.
- Hacker, a modern-day card game based on the mechanics of Illuminati.
  - Hacker II: The Dark Side
- Illuminati, a game of competing conspiracies, based largely on the Illuminatus! Trilogy by Robert Anton Wilson. Originally published in microgame format followed by three numbered expansions. Later published in a full-sized box with expansions 1 and 2 as Deluxe Illuminati. Expansion 3 would later be reprinted as Illuminati: Brainwash.
  - Illuminati: Y2K: All-card expansion for Deluxe Illuminati
  - Illuminati: Bavarian Fire Drill: All-card expansion for Deluxe Illuminati
  - Illuminati: New World Order (INWO), the collectible card game based on concepts in Illuminati.
    - INWO Subgenius: Expansion based on Church of the Subgenius concepts which can also be played stand-alone.
  - Illuminati Crime Lords, a mafia-based variation on Illuminati which combines gameplay elements of the original Illuminati and INWO.
- King's Blood, a Japanese card game originally published by Kadokawa Shoten.
- Lord of the Fries (card game), a game of zombies attempting to assemble orders in a fast-food restaurant. Originally designed by James Ernest and published by Cheapass Games.
- Munchkin, a card-game parody of hack-and-slash roleplaying with many spinoffs and expansions.
- Nanuk, a game of bidding and bluffing, centered on Inuit hunters.
- Ninja Burger, a fast-paced ninja delivery card game based on the Ninja Burger website.
- Space Pirate Amazon Ninja Catgirls (SPANC), a light-hearted competition between starship crews of cat girls in search of toys and loot.
- Spooks, a Halloween-themed card game where players try to get rid of cards from their hands.

=== Board games ===
- The Awful Green Things from Outer Space, designed by Tom Wham and originally published by TSR.
- Car Wars, futuristic battles between automobiles.
- Dork Tower, a fantasy game that takes place in the world the Dork Tower characters play their games in.
- Frag, "a first-person shooter without a computer".
- Globbo, a black comedy game about a murderous alien babysitter.
- GreedQuest, a light, randomized romp through a simple dungeon to gain loot.
- Knightmare Chess, a chess variant played with cards. Translation of the French Tempête sur l'Echiquier published by Ludodelire.
- Kung Fu 2100, a simple game of hand-to-hand combat where players use martial arts to smash their way into the CloneMaster's fortress.
- Munchkin Quest, a board game variation of the Munchkin card games
- Necromancer, a fantasy game for two players, in which each player becomes a powerful wizard controlling the forces of the Undead.
- Ogre, the classic simulation of future war involving a cybernetic armored juggernaut firing nuclear weapons. Designed by Jackson, and originally published by Metagaming Concepts.
  - Battlesuit, a spin-off of Ogre and G.E.V. featuring infantry using powered armor inspired by Starship Troopers.
  - G.E.V., a spin-off of Ogre focusing on futuristic but "conventional" infantry, artillery, and armor units.
  - Shockwave, an Ogre/G.E.V. expansion set with new units and a new map.
  - Ogre Reinforcements Pack, an Ogre/G.E.V. expansion set with new rules and replacement pieces and maps.
  - Battlefields, an Ogre/G.E.V. expansion set with new rules, pieces, and maps.
- One Page Bulge, a simulation of the German Ardennes Offensive in 1944, with the rules printed on a single page.
- Proteus, a chess variant using dice to represent normal chess pieces.
- Revolution, a blind-bidding area-majority game.
- Snits, two classic Tom Wham games, Snit's Revenge and Snit Smashing, both originally published by TSR.
- Star Traders, a game where players race through space to deliver cargoes.
- The Stars Are Right, a board game where players attempt to change a 5×5 tileboard through the use of cards, and gaining victory points based on certain constellations of symbols.
- Strange Synergy, a game where teams of warriors battle with a different set of powers each game.
- Tile Chess, a multiplayer chess variant played without a chess board.
- X-Bugs, a combat game where futuristic bugs are represented by colorful tiddlywinks.

=== Role-playing games ===
- GURPS, the Generic Universal Role Playing System.
- GURPS Traveller, GDW's Traveller based upon GURPS.
- In Nomine, a game about Angels and Demons based on the popular French role-playing game, In Nomine Satanis / Magna Veritas.
- Killer: The Game of Assassination, a variant of Assassin.
- Munchkin RPG, a series of D20 supplements based on the Munchkin card game.
- Toon, the cartoon role-playing game.
- Transhuman Space, a near-future science fiction setting spanning the Solar System.
- Tribes, players play cave men (and women) trying to protect and nurture their descendants. Partly designed by science fiction author David Brin.

=== Miniatures ===
- Ogre & G.E.V have also been published as in miniatures war gaming format.
- Cardboard Heroes, paper miniatures.

=== Computer games ===
- Autoduel, an action game with role-playing elements. Published by Origin Systems, Inc.
- Ogre A computer version of the Ogre board game. Published by Origin Systems, Inc.
- Ultracorps An online space strategy game originally developed by VR-1.

=== Dice games ===
- Cthulhu Dice, a custom dice game where the faces are Cthulhu symbols, including the Eye of Horus, the Yellow Sign, the Elder Sign, Cthulhu, and Tentacle. You roll the dice to compete with others to be the last sane person left.
- Proteus, a custom dice game where the faces of the dice represent chess pieces. The goal is to change your pawns into higher pieces and take over all your buddies' pieces.
- Zombie Dice, a custom dice game where the faces are Brains, Shotgun Blasts and Feet. The goal is to push your luck stacking up brains before your buddies.

== Magazines ==
=== Publication history ===
Gaming magazines produced by Steve Jackson Games have included:

- The Space Gamer (1980–1985): Steve Jackson took over the magazine from Metagaming Concepts with issue #27, and transferred the magazine to Steve Jackson Games in 1982; the final issue from Steve Jackson Games was #76 in 1985, and the rights were sold to Diverse Talents Inc.
- Fire & Movement (1982–1985): A wargaming magazine purchased from Baron Publishing—sold to Diverse Talents in 1985
- Autoduel Quarterly (1983–1992): Home for Car Wars material moved from The Space Gamer
- Fantasy Gamer (1983–1984): Short-lived magazine split from Space Gamer
- Roleplayer (1986–1993): Replaced The Space Gamer as the company's periodical for their fan base until SJGames started the new generalist magazine Pyramid
- Pyramid (1993–1998): Published for 30 issues as a print magazine
- Pyramid, volume 2 (1998–2008): Published weekly as a subscription-based online magazine
- Journal of the Travellers Aid Society (starting 2000): SJ Games resurrected Game Designers' Workshop's earlier periodical as an online magazine
- d20 Weekly (2002–2003): An online magazine devoted to the d20 market
- Pyramid, volume 3 (starting 2008): A PDF-only version of the magazine
