= The President (board game) =

Board game

The President is a board game published by Merad Design Games in 1983.

== Contents ==
The President is a game in which players must win the nomination of their party, and then win the election for president of the United States.

== Reception ==
Paul Cockburn reviewed Westminster: The Election Game, Poleconomy, and The President for Imagine magazine, and stated that "The luck element in The President is stronger than in the other two games, which might make it more acceptable for family play, but the theme is more likely to be a hinderance to sales in the UK than a help."
