= Daredevil Adventures 1: Deadly Coins =

Tabletop fantasy role-playing game supplement

Daredevil Adventures
featuring Deadly Coins and other stories
- Cover by Bob Charrette
- Designers: J. Andrew Keith; Bob Charrette; Stefan Jones
- Publishers: Fantasy Games Unlimited
- Publication: 1983; 42 years ago
- Genres: Super hero
- Systems: Custom D20 resolution

Daredevil Adventures featuring Deadly Coins and other stories is an adventure published by Fantasy Games Unlimited (FGU) in 1983 for the pulp magazine-inspired role-playing game Daredevils.

== Contents ==
Daredevil Adventures featuring Deadly Coins and other stories includes three adventure scenarios:

- "The Powers of Dr. Remoux" by Stefan Jones
- "Bring it Back Alive!" by Bob Charrette
- "Deadly Coins" by J. Andrew Keith

== Publication history ==
FGU published the role-playing game Daredevils in 1982. The first set of adventures, Daredevil Adventures 1: Deadly Coins, was published the following year, a 24-page softcover with illustrations by William H. Keith Jr. Three more sets of adventures followed — Daredevil Adventures Vol. 2 No. 2: The Menace Beneath the Sea, Daredevil Adventures 3: Supernatural Thrillers Issue, and Daredevil Adventures Vol. 2 No. 4: Lost World Tales — before publication ceased due to poor sales.

== Reception ==
William A. Barton reviewed Daredevil Adventures Vol. 2, No. 1 for Fantasy Gamer magazine and stated that "Overall, I recommend Daredevil Adventures Vol. 2, No. 1, not only for those who play Daredevils, but for anyone who wishes an example of the type of scenario that will make for interesting and exciting play in any '30s-era game. In fact, I'm finding it difficult to wait to learn what will happen in the sequel to 'Deadly Coins.' Is this how it was with the old serials?"

Writing for Imagine, Paul Cockburn found that Daredevil Adventures 1: Deadly Coins successfully recreated the pulp magazine genre but at the expense of creativity, saying, "The plotlines are not very startling, but the key elements are simply found by the GM, and there is usually at least one blind alley for the adventurers to follow, but I find with all these games that, in an effort to catch the cliché that epitomises the era, the plots fall into expected grooves, and that most sophisticated players in the '80s will easily see through the deceptions of a more innocent age."
