= Star Explorer =

1982 board game

Cover art, 1982

Star Explorer is a science fiction-themed board game published by Fantasy Games Unlimited in 1982.

== Description ==
Star Explorer is a board game of space exploration for one to four players designed by Douglas Bonforte and Leonard H. Kanterman, with artwork by Bob Charrette and Jeff Dee. Although not licensed by Paramount Pictures, the game is modelled after themes and tropes found in the Star Trek television series.

The game components are:

- 16” x 20” game board
- sheet of paper counters that represent crew teams, ships, hazards, and planets.
- ship logsheet, command logsheet, and planetary logsheet (to be photocopied)
- 20-page rulebook
- two six-sided dice, a ten-sided die, and a twenty-sided die

== Gameplay ==
Each player commands a Space Fleet Service cruiser, and tries to complete various missions in order to earn victory points.

=== Setup ===
Each player receives a randomly allocated planet and a random mission to begin, and then uses a pool of points to design their starship and allocate crew.

=== Turns ===
The person with the fewest victory points goes first, and can either move, do planetary actions, or engage in combat with hostile aliens.

=== Planetary actions ===
When a ship arrives at a new planet, the type of planet is randomly determined. The player determines what types of crew teams should be sent. Several random encounters are determined, as well as team encounters. Engineers or military can also be sent down to prospect for fuel. Each encounter is resolved by die rolls, with modifiers for the types of team that are present, and more die rolls determine victory points earned (from 3-21), as well as number of teams lost. If the player withdraws from an encounter, the player is penalized the number of victory points that the encounter was worth.

=== Victory conditions ===
The person with the most victory points after twenty turns is the winner.

== Reception ==
In the May 1983 edition of White Dwarf (Issue #41), Alan E. Paull found the game to be "well-constructed and immensely playable," although he did say that "Star Explorer is not a game for those who dislike dice, because all these encounters are resolved by consulting tables and rolling dice." Although Paull found "the rather unimaginative artwork [...] does detract slightly from the quality of the product," he thought the game was "very well balanced", pointing out that "It is not possible to win just by selecting one or two particular encounter types and betting everything on them." He concluded by giving the game an excellent rating of 9 out of 10, saying, "Above all, the game plays smoothly and swiftly and rarely gets bogged down in inactivity."

J. C. Conner reviewed Star Explorer for Imagine magazine, and stated that "this is an interesting game with some good ideas, but the components and rules show a lack of play testing and the artwork leaves much to be desired. The game Is better for solitaire play than for a group but the main criticism is that it is grossly overpriced. It is not, in my opinion, a recommended buy."

In a retrospective review for Black Gate, John O'Neill recalled that Star Explorer disappeared from the marketplace quickly, "which is a shame, because it had a lot of potential." He called the rulebook "a miracle of concise design, punching in at a slim 16 pages."

== Reviews ==
- Games #41
- Sorcerer's Apprentice #16

== Other recognition ==
A copy of Star Explorer is held in the collection of the Strong National Museum of Play (Object ID 117.788).
