= Scenario Pack A1: Operation Morpheus =

Tabletop role-playing game supplement

Scenario Pack A1: Operation Morpheus is a 1981 role-playing game adventure for Aftermath! published by Fantasy Games Unlimited.

== Plot summary ==
Operation Morpheus is an adventure scenario for beginning player characters as they awaken from cryogenic sleep and find themselves in the postholocaust world.

Operation Morpheus is the second scenario pack published for Aftermath, and presents background information to be used as a campaign setting, as well as supplemental materials to be used with the game system.

== Publication history ==
Operation Morpheus was written by Phil McGregor, with art by Bob Charrette, and was published in 1982 by Fantasy Games Unlimited as a 56-page book. Sydney: The Wilderness Campaign is the sequel.

== Reception ==
Chris Baylis reviewed Operation Morpheus for Imagine magazine, and stated that "If you have the rules to Aftermath, and you enjoy the game, I suggest that you take yourself off to your nearest stockist, and invest in Operation Morpheus, you, or your players, won't regret it. (Well maybe the dead ones will – a little!!!)"

William A. Barton reviewed Operation Morpheus in Space Gamer No. 65. Barton commented that "if you're an Aftermath enthusiast, you won't want to pass this one up. It is an outstanding addition to that game system."
