= Bushido (role-playing game) =

Tabletop role-playing game

- Second edition, core rules, book II cover
- Designers: Robert N. Charrette; Paul R. Hume
- Publishers: Phoenix Games
- Publication: 1979 (Tyr Games); 1980 (Phoenix Games); 1981 (Fantasy Games Unlimited)
- Genres: Fantasy
- Systems: Custom

Bushido is a Samurai role-playing game set in Feudal Japan, originally designed by Robert N. Charrette and Paul R. Hume and published originally by Tyr Games, then Phoenix Games, and subsequently by Fantasy Games Unlimited. The setting for the game is a land called Nippon, and characters adventure in this heroic, mythic, and fantastic analogue of Japan's past.

It is thematically based on Chanbara movies, such as those made by Akira Kurosawa, in which the heroes are modestly superhuman but not extraordinarily so.

== Overview ==
The Bushido role-playing game was originally published in 1979 by Tyr Games (which quickly went out of business) but was more widely released in 1980 by Phoenix Games as a boxed set. This edition included a map of Nippon, a tri-fold screen, a character sheet, Book I, The Heroes of Nippon, the Players Guidebook and Book II, The Land of Nippon, the Gamesmaster's Guidebook. All illustrations in the original boxed set are copyright by Robert N. Charrette. The game is now sold as a single book in which the two original books are combined (otherwise unaltered).

Bushido players define characters with a series of attributes, skills, professions, and levels. The professions are Bushi (fighters), Budoka (martial artists), Yakuza (gangsters), Ninja, Shugenja (Taoist-style wizards) and Gakusho (priests, either Buddhist or Shinto). Character progression is implemented by both down-time training and level advancement. There are only six character levels.

Social aspects are important in the game. Each character is randomly assigned at birth to a class in the strict feudal hierarchy of Nippon - Samurai, various commoner classes, and Eta. For level advancement, honourable behaviour and loyal service to the character's social group (the local lord, the ninja clan, the temple, the gang, etc.) are as important as defeating enemies in battle.

The Bushido system is dice-based, most important rolls being made with a twenty-sided (d20) die. The gamemaster can use the various social obligations of the characters to create dilemmas which cannot necessarily be overcome by violence.

Shugenja and Gakusho can use magic. At the discretion of the gamemaster, supernatural monsters may feature in the game.

== Reception ==
Bushido received mixed reviews, with many critics praising the body of knowledge about Japanese culture, but questioning the number-heavy game design.

In the June–July 1979 edition of Different Worlds (Issue 3), Stephen L. Lortz found the rules "well written and logically ordered." He also liked the introduction of "On points", noting that it "placed Bushido outside of the 'kill and pillage' category of RPGs [...] On encourages players to steer their characters into social and political, as well as combat situations, and does much to generate the authentic flavor of the game." He concluded, "I highly recommend Bushido to people who are interested in running a fantasy campaign based primarily on the Japanese mythos and to people who are interested in the art of RPG design."

In the February 1980 edition of Dragon (Issue 34), D. Okada was disappointed by "a horrendous amount of typographical errors in the rules... There are times when they do hamper understanding of what is supposed to be going on." Okada also noted a lack of detailed background on medieval Japan, and concluded with a guarded recommendation: "Despite these faults, the game is worth the price to the person interested in developing a more cosmopolitan outlook."

In the July 1980 edition of The Space Gamer (Issue No. 29), Forrest Johnson was unimpressed, saying, "Karate fans and samurai fans may dig this one. Serious students will just have to wait for something better."

In the March 1981 edition of Ares (Issue 7), Eric Goldberg found fault with the character generation system that determines certain aspects randomly, but then uses a point-buy system to allow a player to optimize the character. "There is a logical argument for both methods — even in conjunction — but one's purpose defeats the other." Goldberg liked the code of honor in the game, which he felt "distinguishes Bushido from most other role-playing games." But he felt that otherwise, Bushido was "unremarkable", and gave a half-hearted recommendation: "Bushido is a nice enough meld of a surrealistic and D&D-style flavor, and has a game system sturdy enough to support this impression."

In the August 1982 edition of White Dwarf magazine (Issue #32), Mike Polling rated Bushido 10 out of 10, saying that it was "maybe the best game I have ever seen... The game system is one of the most intelligent and carefully thought out I have ever seen."

In Issue 15 of the French games magazine Casus Belli, Martin Latallo thought the strong points of the game "lie in the atmosphere and the realism that emerge from this Japanese setting." Latallo liked the strong writing, noting that "none of the important rules are ambiguous or left to the discretion of the gamemaster."

Ron Pehr reviewed Bushido and Chivalry & Sorcery for Fantasy Gamer magazine and stated that "As fascinating roleplaying experiences, either of these games is superb; neither will disappoint any serious gamer; both are highly recommended as near-ultimate fantasy roleplaying games."

In the January–February 1985 edition of Different Worlds (Issue #38), Scott Dillinger gave it an average rating of 3 stars out of 4, saying, "Professionalism is reflected in all aspects of Bushido and the research and design of this system combines to give players an opportunity to learn about, and to experience this fascinating culture and still have fun doing it. In this industry that's all one can ask for."

In April 1985, Imagine dedicated Issue #25 to Japanese and "far east" role-playing. Bushido was praised by Mike Brunton for focusing on "non-adventuring skills", indicating how it was different than the current version of Advanced Dungeons & Dragons.

In Issue 35 of Casus Belli, Philippe Adolf reviewed the French translation of Bushido by Hexagonal, and complained "it is a shame that Hexagonal, which publishes Bushido in France, has remained too faithful to the English original, a somewhat outdated presentation, resulting in poor organization of the booklets. (It is absurd to wait until page 45 to explain character creation!)" Nonetheless Adolf concluded, "Despite these few details, Bushido remains the best game in its category, with a translation faithful to the original. Experienced players who have the 'way of the sword' in their blood will not be able to do without it!"

In the pages of his 1987 book, Role-Playing Mastery, Dungeons & Dragons co-creator E. Gary Gygax mentioned Bushido in his short list of notable RPGs.

In the June 1988 edition of Dragon (Issue 134), Jim Bambra compared the various role-playing game systems set in Japan, and found Bushido to be very complex. "It is a game for dedicated gamers who, in their pursuit of Oriental action, are willing to struggle with rule books that make advanced nuclear theory texts seem like light reading by comparison." Bambra found the biggest issue to be the badly organized rules. "A revamping and reordering of this material would go a long way to making the game more accessible. Compared to more recent games, the Bushido game is a work of enthusiasm, with little or no thought given to presentation or ease of use." Bambra also found the character generation system to be "difficult and involved", and the game's mechanics to "work fairly well but are convoluted in places." Bambra also pointed out that in the decade since Bushido had been published, only two adventure-supplements had been published, leaving all the work of creating an adventure to each gamemaster. Bambra concluded that newer games systems provided better ease of use. "If you’re looking for a stand-alone system, then check out the Bushido game. But if accessibility and ease of use are your primary requirements, stay well away. The two other supplements under review this month [Runequest: Land of Ninja and Oriental Adventures] are superior models of presentation, and they build upon tried and tested systems. The Bushido game is for those who like complication for complication's sake."

In the June 1989 edition of Games International (Issue 6), Ian Marsh was impressed by how much of the social, spiritual and cultural was highlighted, saying, "Bushido developed the idea that a game should be more than a rules system by making culture a strong element in play." But Marsh noted that subsequently, "its attractions to mainstream roleplayers are limited." He also noted the lack of published adventures, commenting, "anyone who buys Bushido has to develop their own scenarios, making the game less appealing to referees who have little enough time to run games as it is." He concluded by giving this game an above average rating of 4 out of 5, saying, "It's a cult game, and nothing's going to change that [...] which is a shame for Bushido genuinely presents a role-playing challenge."

In Issue 29 of Shadis, Rob Vaux considered this game to be "one of the most thoroughly researched role-playing games that I've ever encountered." Vaux did think that the game system was "number heavy and cumbersome, but the detail in explaining Japanese culture, ideology, philosophy and history is unparalleled in the industry."

In his 1990 book The Complete Guide to Role-Playing Games, game critic Rick Swan called it "one of the earliest and most successful fantasy RPGs with an Oriental setting, thoroughly grounded in medieval Japanese history." However, Swan warned "It's not an easy game to learn — the rules more closely resemble those of a military simulation than a conventional RPG — but experienced players with an interest in the era should find a lot to enjoy." Swan gave the game a rating of 3 out of 4.

Steve Faragher did a retrospective review of Bushido for the May 1996 edition of Arcane, stating that "Politics and action went hand in hand with Bushido and the game had an innately epic scale."

In a 1996 reader poll in Arcane magazine, Bushido was ranked 17th of the 50 most popular roleplaying games of all time. Editor Paul Pettengale commented:

Those of us who have had the pleasure of playing Bushido over an extended period of time have noticed that this is a game which lends itself far more towards campaign play than one-off scenarios. Consequently, it takes a lot of effort and dedication on the part of the players and referee alike to play through, and even more effort to run successfully. Nevertheless, the effort is rewarded with fun, albeit a somewhat reserved, thoughtful kind of fun, rather than the more gung-ho kind of action you would usually expect from the likes of AD&D.

In his 2023 book Monsters, Aliens, and Holes in the Ground, RPG historian Stu Horvath noted, "In portraying these social responsibilities, Bushido becomes one of the earliest games whose mechanics attempt to both establish and enforce the game's theme ... And it works, despite some issues."

== Supplements published for Bushido ==
- Bushido Gamemaster's Screen, published by Phoenix Games in 1980
- Valley of the Mists by Robert N. Charrette, published by Fantasy Games Unlimited in 1982.
- Takishido's Debt by Steve Bell, published by Games of Liverpool in 1983.
- A Tale of Honor Lost by Jeffrey A. O'Hare, published by Fantasy Games Unlimited in 2016.
- Honor Bound by Stephen Dedman, published by Fantasy Games Unlimited in 2016.
- The Path of Honor by Stephen Dedman, published by Fantasy Games Unlimited in 2019.
- Ninja - Shadows Over Nippon, never released
- Adventures in White Dwarf #47 (Kwaidan by Oliver Johnson and Dave Morris)
- Articles in White Dwarf #57 (Ninjas), #85 (Entertainers)

== Other East Asian-themed role-playing games ==
- Land of the Rising Sun: a heavily modified version of Chivalry & Sorcery written by Lee Gold and published in 1980 by Fantasy Games Unlimited
- Oriental Adventures: a supplement for the Advanced Dungeons & Dragons role-playing game, written by Gary Gygax, David "Zeb" Cook, and François Marcela-Froideval and published in 1985 by Gary Gygax's TSR, Inc.
- Land of Ninja: published simultaneously in 1987 in the USA by Avalon Hill and in the UK by Games Workshop (but each edition having its own cover art) Land of Ninja was a supplement for the third edition of RuneQuest, but set in a both mythological and historical Japan.
- GURPS Japan: Roleplaying in the World of the Shogunate: written by Lee Gold and Hunter Johnson and published by Steve Jackson Games in 1988. An expanded 2nd edition was published in 1999.
- Legend of the Five Rings: a role-playing game and accompanying collectible card game, produced in 1995 by Alderac Entertainment Group.
- Usagi Yojimbo Roleplaying Game: an anthropomorphic animal samurai role-playing game written by Greg Stolze and published in 1997 by Gold Rush Games. Based on the Usagi Yojimbo comic book series by Stan Sakai.
- Sengoku: produced in 1999 by Gold Rush Games.
- Shinobi: Shadows of Nihon: a supplement to Sengoku written by Darren-Joe Ashmore and Mark T. Arsenault and published by Gold Rush Games in 2001.
- Oriental Adventures (third edition): produced in 2001 by Wizards of the Coast.
- Usagi Yojimbo Role-Playing Game: an anthropomorphic animal samurai role-playing game written by Jason Holmgren and Pieter van Hiel and published in 2005 by Sanguine Productions. A 2nd edition of this game was published in 2019. Based on the Usagi Yojimbo comic book series by Stan Sakai.
- Ruins and Ronin: Produced in 2009 by Mike Davison and Sword +1 Productions, a Medieval/Fantasy-themed role-playing game set in a Japanese cultural setting. 2nd Edition produced in 2015 by Hydra Collective.
- Chanbara: produced in 2018 by Dennis Laffey and Hidden Treasure Books.
