= Campaign Pack A2: Sydney The Wilderness Campaign =

Role-playing game supplement

Cover art by Bob Charrette, 1984

Campaign Pack A2: Sydney The Wilderness Campaign is a supplement published by Fantasy Games Unlimited (FGU) in 1984 for the post-apocalyptic role-playing game Aftermath!.

== Description ==
Aftermath! describes a post-apocalyptic world following a world-wide plague and nuclear war. The 1982 supplement Scenario Pack A1: Operation Morpheus described how the player characters awoke from cryogenic sleep to find themselves in a savage Australia similar to Mad Max. Campaign Pack A2: Sydney The Wilderness Campaign continues this storyline, describing the causes of the Ruin, details of the University of Sydney, and the current state of the city of Sydney. The book moves the campaign plotline forward, and also details various denizens of the city and the bands of survivors in the outlands surrounding the city. It is designed as a pack for the gamemaster to start campaign, and contains information about the current political state of the world, which can be provided to the player characters bit by bit as they interact with non-player characters.

== Publication history ==
FGU published Aftermath! in 1981, and followed that the next year with the Operation Morpheus supplement. In 1984. FGU published the sequel Sydney: The Wilderness Campaign, a 52-page softcover book written by Phil McGregor, with interior illustrations by Liz Danforth and cover art by Bob Charrette.

== Reception ==
In Issue 20 of Imagine (November 1984), Chris Baylis found the book was "full of useful ideas and suggestions." He did note that many of the listed encounters were "deadly", although he thought they might "raise a giggle when first met", citing in particular "machine-gun toting rabbits." Baylis liked the emphasis on role-playing over combat, and concluded, "Since Aftermath! depends more on negotiating and problem-solving than on shooting straight, [Sydney] should become a useful aid to all referees."
