= Trail of the Gold Spike =

Tabletop role-playing game supplement

Trail of the Gold Spike cover

Trail of the Gold Spike is a 1984 fantasy role-playing game adventure published by Hero Games for Justice, Inc.

== Plot summary ==
Trail of the Gold Spike is an adventure in which the player characters oppose the evil Condor as he tries to ruin the Whitley family and their mining business. Though written for Justice, Inc. , it was also "approved for use with" and included statistics for Chill, Call of Cthulhu and Daredevils.

Trail of the Gold Spike presented conversions for Call of Cthulhu, Daredevils, and Mercenaries, Spies and Private Eyes.

== Reception ==
William A. Barton reviewed Trail of the Gold Spike in Space Gamer No. 72. Barton commented that "Trail of the Gold Spike is simply a lot of fun - to read, play, or GM. If you play any of the systems for which the adventure is designed, I heartily recommend it as the next exciting installment of your gaming career!"
