= Justice, Inc. (role-playing game) =

- Justice, Inc. cover
- Designers: Aaron Allston, Steve Peterson, Michael Stackpole
- Publishers: Hero Games
- Publication: 1984
- Genres: Pulp magazine adventures
- Systems: Hero System

Justice, Inc. is a role-playing game published by Hero Games in 1984 that simulates adventure stories that appeared in the pulp magazines of the 1930s.

== Description ==
Justice Inc. is a role-playing game in which the players take on the roles of fictional adventurers in the 1930s similar to Doc Savage and Allan Quatermain. In keeping with the pulp theme engendered by Fu Manchu and The Shadow, a vein of the supernatural runs through the game and can be turned to horror similar to Call of Cthulhu.

The game system was adapted from the superhero role-playing game Champions previously published by Hero Games, although superhero "Powers" are toned down to "Talents".

== Publishing history ==
Hero Games published the superhero game Champions in 1981 and subsequently published several expansions and adventures. In 1983, Hero published role-playing in a completely different genre, Espionage!, that used a toned-down version of the Champions superhero rules. Hero followed this in 1984 with Justice, Inc., a game that used the Espionage! rules system. The two-volume set was written by Aaron Allston, Steve Peterson, and Michael Stackpole and includes a rulebook and campaign book. The campaign book discusses the pulp genre, the "Empire Club" campaign setting, a timeline of real-world events of the 1920s and 1930s, and several pulp adventures.

Espionage! and Justice, Inc. were the first non-superhero applications of the point-based game system developed for Champions. The generalized point system would eventually be published as the multi-genre Hero System, following in the footsteps of Chaosium's Basic Role-Playing System but preceding GURPS as a generic game system.

Two supplements were published:

- Lands of Mystery (May 1985), a critically acclaimed sourcebook describing how to design and run "Lost World" adventures, like those found in the fiction of Edgar Rice Burroughs and H. Rider Haggard. ISBN 0-917481-60-7
- Trail of the Gold Spike (August 1984), an adventure set around a Colorado gold mine.

Both were written by Allston and also included statistics for Chill, Call of Cthulhu and Daredevils.

Unlike several other products in the "Hero" line, Justice, Inc. was not revised or republished decades after its release. However, at the end of 2005, Hero Games finally published a "Pulp Hero" genre book that covered much of the same ground.

== Reception ==
In the December 1984 edition of Imagine (Issue 21), Paul Mason stated, "If you like the Champions rules system and want a campaign set in the era of the pulps, then Justice Inc will be perfect for you. Otherwise, I'm afraid I can't recommend it over its competition."

In the January–February 1985 edition of Space Gamer (No. 72), Allen Varney commented, "Justice Inc. is fundamentally solid work, and certainly adaptable to a wide spectrum of pulp-era melodramatics. If your players want lots of variety in one campaign, this is your game! I realize it's a close call, but I'd say that with this publication, Hero Games probably has the strongest roleplaying line on the market."

In the January–February 1985 edition of Different Worlds (Issue #38), Russell Grant Collins gave this game an average rating of 2.5 stars out of 4, saying, "this game is pretty good, although it is marred by a few typos and suffers from incompleteness."

In his 1990 book The Complete Guide to Role-Playing Games, game critic Rick Swan called this game "perfect for ambitious referees who enjoy mixing Indiana Jones with H.P. Lovecraft, or Sherlock Holmes with little green men." Swan concluded by giving this game a rating of 3 out of 4, saying, "Although [the] designers ... bit off a bit more than they could chew — it's unlikely, for instance, that the horror version of the game will make anybody give up Call of Cthulhu — the clean rules and attention to detail make Justice, Inc. far and away the best of the pulp-era RPGs."

== Other reviews ==
- Shadis #28 (1996)
- Comics Feature #32
- Game News #6 (Aug., 1985)

== See also ==
- Justice, Inc. - the pulp magazine story that inspired the game title
