= Westminster: The Election Game =

Board game

Westminster: The Election Game is a board game published by Gibsons Games in 1983.

== Contents ==
Westminster: The Election Game is a game for 2–6 players designed by Charles Lewis that simulates the legislative workings of the House of Commons of the United Kingdom.

=== Components ===
The game box contains:

- 4-piece game board
- 6 Bill of Parliament cards
- 6 Prime Minister tokens
- 12 Cabinet Minister tokens
- 32 Member of Parliament tokens
- 32 constituency cards
- 40 Dispatch Box cards
- 96 vote cards
- 120 Party pegs (20 each in 6 colours)
- Pad of State of the Parties Record sheets
- rules

=== Set up ===
Each player selects a colour. One player is selected to be Speaker of the House, and is in charge of all elections. Each player receives 50,000 votes to spend on elections.

=== Gameplay ===
The game starts with a general election held in 16 constituencies. Players take turns choosing which constituencies to spend votes in. When all votes have been spent, the votes are added up, and each constituency is awarded to the highest vote-spender. The player with the most constituencies becomes the Prime Minister and forms the government. A further 16 by-elections are held during the game, and may result in a change of government.

=== Victory conditions ===
The player who is able to become Prime Minister and hold onto power long enough to pass a bill through three readings so that it becomes law is the winner.

== Reception ==
Paul Cockburn reviewed Westminster: The Election Game in Issue 21 of Imagine, and stated that "it is very easy to play, and there is sufficient need for intelligent play that good players will triumph over the not-so-good."

In Issue 3 of Games International, Alan R. Moon thought the game had potential, but noted that it had been rushed to production to coincide with the 1983 general election in the UK, resulting in "sloppy" and ambiguous rules. He found the start of the game was "well thought out", but questioned a rule at the end of the game that prevented voting alliances during the third reading of the bill (to win the game). He pointed out that getting the bill passed is impossible until enough by-elections are run for one player to assemble a majority of votes. As Moon pointed out, "this means the game drags on and on."
