= Space Empires (board game) =

Cover of rulebook, art by Lois Griffin

Space Empires is a science fiction board game published by Mayfair Games in 1981.

== Description ==
Space Empires is a science fiction game of conquest for 2–6 players. Twelve alien races, identified by a letter of the alphabet from A to L, vie for control of a star sector. The basic game includes rules for combat and movement, as well as rules for the production of ships. The advanced game gives each race one unique ability. For example, Race A can use a paralyzing ray to capture ships and add them to their own fleet.

=== Components ===
Space Empires, a microgame packaged in a ziplock bag, has the following components:

- paper hex grid map with twelve home systems identified by color.
- 108 die-cut counters, in twelve colors corresponding to the different races of aliens.
- rule book with cover art

=== Setup ===
Each player randomly draws two of the races, and places their ships on their home worlds. Any alien races not chosen become neutral parties, and their ships are stacked on their home worlds.

=== Gameplay ===
Each turn consists of three phases:

1. Production: The number of systems controlled by a player determines how many production points are available.
2. Building: Each player can build ships with production points. Any excess points can be banked.
3. Movement and Combat: Each race, in alphabetical order, can move as many ships as desired. If a ship travels into another ship's zone of control, it must stop and engage in combat.

=== Victory conditions ===
If, at the end of a turn, one player controls seven or more systems, the other players have one turn to reduce this number to six or less. If they are successful, the game continues. If they are not, the player who still has control of at least seven systems is the winner.

Alternatively, the players can set a limit of either time or number of turns. The player who controls the most systems at the end of the game is the winner.

== Publication history ==
Mayfair Games was founded in 1981 to publish the board game Empire Builder. One of their next products was 1981's Space Empires, a microgame designed by Neil Zimmerer, with cover art by Lois Griffin. An expansion set was mentioned in the Space Empires rulebook, but was never published.

== Reception ==
In Issue 47 of The Space Gamer, William A. Barton thought the game was perhaps a bit too simple, saying, ""Overall, Space Empires is an interesting, enjoyable game if you like easy-to-play 'quickies' with a twist. If you prefer a lot of complications, you might want to pass this one up – or perhaps wait for the expansion set mentioned at the end."

Steffan O'Sullivan thought the random draw of aliens at the start of the game gave it a high replayability factor, but disliked the fact that "some players will be out of the game early, while the game can continue a long time thereafter." Nevertheless, he recommended the game, saying, "Pick one up if you like the idea of multi-player science fiction wargames - this is a good one."

In Issue 27 of Simulacrum, Brian Train noted, "If you can get past the idea of starships having Zones of Control and the simple AR/DR/EX Combat Results Table, you will have fun with this."

David Lent and Len Krol of Centurion's Review found the game easy to learn, calling it "a space version of Risk". They felt the two-player game was unbalanced, with favor going to the player with the better initial draw of races, and thought the game would be more balanced with 3–4 players. They questioned the use of zones of control, where ships passing within one hex of another ship had to stop and engage in combat. Although this is standard in land-based wargames, Lent and Krol found its use "bizarre in an outer space-based game."
