= Anthony Bryant =

Anthony Bryant may refer to:

- Anthony Bryant (American football) (born 1981), NFL defensive tackle
- Anthony J. Bryant (1961–2013), American author
- Tony Bryant (born 1976), American football defensive end
