= Gangster! =

1979 Prohibition-era role-playing game

Gangster! is a role-playing game published by Fantasy Games Unlimited (FGU) in 1979 that is set in the 1920s in Chicago during the American Prohibition.

== Gameplay ==
Gangster! is a cops-and-mobsters role-playing game system set Chicago in the 1920s. Players can choose to be on the side of the law as police (city or federal), or they can roleplay a criminal, either as a loner or as part of a syndicate. The combat covers many sorts of firearms. The game rules include sections on crimes and corruption, gang wars, police methods, forensic medicine, FBI labs, and SWAT teams, with guidelines on the laws of the land, criminal law, conviction, and penalties.

Although the game is slanted towards the Prohibition era, rules are included for modern weaponry so that the game could be set in the present day.

A player starts character generation by determining their character's attributes with dice, then use the dice again to determine the number of crime-busting or criminal skills the character has. Low dice rolls may leave a character with no skills.

Reviewer Kenneth Burke noted that the combat system in Gangster! is unusually lethal compared to other roleplaying systems, pointing out that a knife wound having almost no effect on a character in the science fiction role-playing game Gamma World could be lethal in Gangster!

== Publication history ==
Gangster! was designed by Nick Marinacci and Pete Petrone, who consulted a former New York police officer about the design. The game was published by FGU in 1979 as a boxed set with a 56-page rulebook, a "patrol guide" booklet describing the numerous laws that the characters must uphold (or break), a character record sheet, and combat tables.

Players could also purchase 25 mm metal miniatures that had been designed by Robert N. Charrette.

== Reception ==
Leonard H. Kanterman, M.D. reviewed Gangster! for Different Worlds magazine and stated that "should a Gamemaster find that his group has fallen into a rut, and castle walls and twisting caverns have become so familiar a setting that there is boring repetition rather than fresh adventure, he would be well-advised to 'check it out' with Gangster."

In the March 1980 edition of Dragon, Kenneth Burke generally admired Gangster, although he was disappointed that the game did not supply the three six-sided dice and the twenty-sided die required for play. Burke did not like the character generation system, which, he said, is "one of the few flaws of Gangster — characters without unusually high ability levels [are] unable to qualify for any skills, the criminals in particular." However, he admired the combat system for its realistic lethality. "This attitude towards melee I find refreshing; role-playing games too often have rules that reduce the true effect of weapon hits, making combat the 'easy way out.' Gangster puts an end to this nonsense with one of the most realistic melee systems in existence." Burke highly recommended it, saying, "Of all the role-playing games in existence, Gangster is undoubtedly the most original. On a scale of one to ten, I rate Gangster a ten, and advise all to buy it.

In the July 1980 issue of Fantastic Science Fiction, Greg Costikyan called it "Another game that only Fantasy Games Unlimited would publish." Costikyan called the rules "fairly simple, but cover many areas — combat, prostitution, and numbers running, for instance and include much information that gamemasters generally wouldn't otherwise know — such as how police respond to reports of crimes, what federal and typical state laws are like, and so on." He concluded, "The rules are limited and simplistic — but, with a bit of work, they can be used as the basis for a campaign."

In his 1990 book The Complete Guide to Role-Playing Games, game critic Rick Swan thought that the designers had striven for authenticity "and are largely successful, even though the game systems don't quite measure up to Gangster!'s ambitious scope." Swan found some of those limitations in the rules, writing, "Though it's a simple system, it's not particularly satisfying. It lacks the sophistication and versatility of similar reality-based games such as Mercenaries, Spies and Private Eyes and Top Secret. Worse, there's little help for the referee; there are no clear instructions for putting together adventures or staging burglaries, bank robberies, and other criminal activities." However, Swan thought Gangster! excelled as a source of material for other games, writing that "the sourcebook material is exceptional." Swan concluded by only giving the game a rating of 2 out of 4, but noted "Lucid and informative, the sourcebook material could add a touch of authenticity to any RPG with a contemporary setting."
