= Daredevil Adventures Vol. 2 No. 2: The Menace Beneath the Sea =

Daredevil Adventures Vol. 2 No. 2: The Menace Beneath the Sea is a 1983 role-playing game adventure for Daredevils published by Fantasy Games Unlimited.

== Plot summary ==
Daredevil Adventures Vol. 2 No. 2: The Menace Beneath the Sea includes two adventure scenarios, "The Secret of Tahuka Hiva" and "The Menace Beneath the Sea".

== Reception ==
Paul Cockburn reviewed Daredevil Adventures, vol 2, no 2 for Imagine magazine, and stated that "The plotlines are not very startling, but the key elements are simply found by the GM, and there is usually at least one blind alley for the adventurers to follow, but I find with all these games that, in an effort to catch the cliché that epitomises the era, the plots fall into expected grooves, and that most sophisticated players in the '80s will easily see through the deceptions of a more innocent age."

Marcus L. Rowland reviewed Daredevils Adventure 2 for White Dwarf #51, giving it an overall rating of 7 out of 10, and stated that "didn't enjoy any of the scenarios as much as I did those included in the game."

William A. Barton reviewed Daredevil Adventures Vol. 2 No. 2: The Menace Beneath the Sea in Space Gamer No. 70. Barton commented that "Overall, Daredevil Adventures, Vol. 2, No. 2, The Menace Beneath the Sea is an excellent set of scenarios and ideas for Daredevils play. Even if you never use the adventures themselves, you'll find a wealth of material for use in your own game."
