= Lands of Mystery =

Tabletop role-playing game supplement

Cover art by Denis Loubet

Lands of Mystery is a supplement published by Hero Games in 1985 for the action-adventure pulp fiction role-playing game Justice, Inc. It was the first work connected to role-playing games that suggested that the players could be assigned specific stereotyped roles within the party such as Strong-Jawed Hero or Girl Seeking Her Father.

== Contents ==
Lands of Mystery is a book by Aaron Allston that can be used by the gamemaster to make up an adventure or campaign in the genre "Lost World Romance". As critic Michael Dobson wrote, this is "a campaign set in a place hidden away from the civilized world, discovered by a party of pulp adventurers, filled with danger, excitement, romance, and the inevitable beautiful princess." Critic Russell Grant Collins noted that these would be similar to the Pellucidar stories by Edgar Rice Burroughs, and Jules Verne's various lost civilizations novels.

Allston provides advice on how to set up a place hidden away from the civilized world, as well as how to start with a simple theme for a campaign, and then create a series of linked "episodes", similar to creating a storyboard of scenes for a movie. The book also advises the gamemaster to set out stereotyped roles for everyone in the party of adventurers, and then assign each player to a role. Michael Dobson noted that Allston suggested "(for the first time, to my knowledge) the idea that characters should be assigned roles, as in a play or movie, that fit various stereotypes, such as the Strong-Jawed Hero, the Native Princess, the Girl Seeking Her Father, or even the Cynical Pianist."

The book also includes a complete campaign set in Zorander, a land contained in an alternate dimension linked to Earth. Provisions are made in the book to enable a gamemaster to convert the Zorander campaign to Call of Cthulhu, Daredevils or Chill.

== Publication history ==
Hero Games published the action-adventure pulp role-playing game Justice, Inc. in 1984, and followed it up with Lands of Mystery in 1985, a 96-page soft-cover book written by Aaron Allston, with cover and interior art by Denis Loubet.

== Reception ==
In Issue 76 of Space Gamer (September–October 1985), Allen Varney commented that "There is an undeniable (if fleeting, perhaps) charm in play-acting the roles of those adventurers in Pellucidar or Antarctica. Allston's enthusiasm for the genre is infectious. Its formulized role-motions will almost certainly pale after a few playings, but for those who would like to try a lost-worlds campaign, Lands of Mystery is a valuable sourcebook." Varney concluded, " A strong, professional effort by all concerned."

In Issue 41 of Different Worlds, Russel Grant Collins thought that "This supplement covers everything a gamemaster would need to recreate this genre." However, Collins noted some problems with the numbering system for the many maps in the book, as well as some missing map reference numbers. Collins also warned "some players don't care for this kind of campaign. It's a good idea to check with your prospective players before planning to use this." Collins concluded by giving this book a rating of 3 out of 5, saying, "I recommend Lands Of Mystery to everyone running a Justice Inc. campaign or thinking about running one. It could always be used simply as a change of pace adventure."

In Issue 106 of Dragon, Michael Dobson commented, "It's a shame that Lands of Mystery is tied to such a small market, because it's a wonderful and much-needed guide that provides practical advice for designing a campaign world and creating a story to go with it." Dobson noted that much of the information was transferable to any other genre of role-playing, saying, "it is every bit as useful as an aid in designing a fantasy or science-fiction campaign. It provides advice, tips and techniques that are almost universally applicable in creating a campaign environment." Dobson concluded with a positive recommendation, writing, "Lands of Mystery is an important product; it is one of the few good guides to creating and running a successful campaign. No matter what period you prefer, or what game system you like best, Lands of Mystery is going to be useful."

== Reviews ==
- Comics Feature #39
