= GURPS Espionage =

1992 supplement for the GURPS role-playing game

- Cover art by Jeffrey K. Starling
- Designers: Thomas Kane
- Publishers: Steve Jackson Games
- Publication: 1992; 34 years ago
- Genres: Espionage
- Systems: GURPS third edition

GURPS Espionage is an espionage sourcebook for the third edition of GURPS (Generic Universal Role-Playing System), written by Thomas Kane, and published by Steve Jackson Games in 1992.

== Contents ==
This book is designed to help a gamemaster design a GURPS campaign using an espionage theme set anytime in the Second World War, the Cold War, or after the fall of the Soviet Union. It describes various aspects of espionage such as spycraft, high-tech equipment, typical missions, and various intelligence organizations. Several suggestions for campaign settings are provided. Players can also use the book to design spy characters.

== Publication history ==
GURPS Espionage is a 128-page softcover book written by Thomas Kane, with additional material by Michael Hurst. Interior art is by Darrell Midgette, Gary Washington, Timothy Bradstreet, Guy Burchak, Dan Frazier, Rick Harris, John Robiison, Doug Shuler and Ruth Thompson, with cover at by Jeffrey K. Starling. It was published by Steve Jackson Games (SJG) in 1992 for use with third edition GURPS. The following year, SJG would publish GURPS Operation Endgame, a four-adventure campaign also written by Kane.

== Reception ==
In the June 1993 edition of White Wolf Magazine (Issue 36), Shane Hensley was generally positive, commenting that the book "does exactly what it set out to do, and does it well". He concluded by giving the book an average rating of 3 out of 5, saying, "fans of such games of Top Secret and Mercenaries, Spies, and Private Eyes will probably enjoy [the product] just for the read-through."

== Other reviews ==
- The Last Province Issue 3 (1993, p.8)
- Pyramid Vol.3 Issue 5 (March 2009, p.10)

== See also ==
- List of GURPS publications
