= Daredevils (role-playing game) =

Tabletop role-playing game in the pulp genre

- Cover art by Robert Charrette
- Designers: Robert Charrette; Paul Hume
- Illustrators: Robert Charrette
- Publishers: FGU
- Publication: 1982
- Genres: Pulp magazines

Daredevils is a tabletop role-playing game published by Fantasy Games Unlimited (FGU) in 1982 that is meant to emulate pulp magazine fiction of the 1930s.

== Description ==
Daredevils — subtitled "Roleplaying Action and Adventure in the Two-Fisted Thirties" — is a role-playing game set in a historically accurate Earth of the 1930s that is meant to recall the adventures of pulp magazine characters such as Doc Savage, Sam Spade, Allan Quatermain, and The Shadow, as well as detective novels and film noir detective films of the 1930s and 1940s. The player takes the persona of a detective cum pulp fiction hero. Adventures for Daredevils published in following years involve other themes that were popular in 1930s pulp magazines such as lost worlds, exotic locales, and supernatural horror. The game uses the Basic Chance of Success (BCS) system first developed for FGU's Bushido and Aftermath!.

=== Components ===
The boxed set contains:

- 64-page rulebook that describes the characters' abilities, their careers, skills, movements, forms of combat (with an emphasis on firearms), vehicles, and an overview of life in the 1930s. The book also describes the creation of the game and lists prominent non-player characters.
- 32-page Daredevil Adventures booklet that contains four mini-scenarios
- gamemaster's screen
- blank character sheet
- dice

=== Character generation ===
Character generation is a combination of random dice rolls to generate six abilities and a "point-buy" system for skills.

=== Skill resolution ===
To determine the success or failure of attempted actions, the player divides the character's score in the relevant Skill by 5 (rounding down to the next whole number), and adds or subtracts any relevant factors as determined by the gamemaster. To gain success, the player must roll the resulting number or higher on a twenty-sided die.

=== Combat resolution ===
Resolving success in combat uses the same basic system as for skill resolutions, but with a large number of additional factors such as Weapon Defense Ability, situational modifiers, restrictions, and distractions. If the character successfully scores a hit, the player then calculates a Damage Potential, which varies according to whether hand-to-hand weapons, firearms, or missile weapons were involved. Each hit also has the potential to be a critical hit, which requires further calculations. There are also a number of Special Combat Situations that can have an effect on the final outcome of both the hit and damage.

=== Scenarios ===
Four short scenarios were included:

1. "Fu Sung's Secret": An introductory adventure. The player characters are eating dinner in a Chinese restaurant when an acquaintance holding the remains of a fortune cookie collapses on their table, an ornate dagger in his back.
2. "Fu Sung's Revenge": A sequel to the first adventure. The player characters are poisoned, and have only 24 hours to find the evil Fung Su, who has the antidote. This requires them to infiltrate his mansion and overcome thugs and a death trap.
3. "Black Claws": An adventure in Africa that involves the occult.
4. "On These Mean Streets": During American Prohibition, the player characters receive a note asking for their help, but when they reach the rendezvous, the woman who wrote the note has been murdered.

== Publication history ==
Robert Charrette and Paul Hume developed the BCS role-playing system for the feudal Japanese role-playing game Bushido in 1979. After refining the system for the science fiction game Aftermath (1981), Charrette and Hume designed Daredevils with a slightly streamlined BCS system. It was published by FGU in 1982 as a boxed set with interior and cover art by Charrette.

Over the next three years, FGU published four books of adventures and two supplements, but Daredevils never developed a strong following. The complexity of the rules was noted by several reviewers, and in his 2014 book Designers & Dragons, game historian Shannon Appelcline commented, "It was probably still too awkward and it was only supported with four supplements."

== Reception ==
In the February 1983 edition of Dragon (Issue 70), Ken Ralston found the game "does an admirable job in covering rules many of the important features of adventuring in the modern era of technology." But Ralston found reading the rules to be a slog, exacerbated by the lack of an index. "The style is dense and compressed, presumably because of the designer’s anxiety to include every bit of the detailed and clever rules created to handle combat, skills and tasks, character generation, and the trappings of technology." Ralston also found the combat system "particularly bewildering... It slows the rhythm of the game and distracts from the charming atmosphere so painstakingly developed." On the positive side, he found the character generation system to be "detailed but well organized", and the rules about electricity, locks and disease "entertaining and credible." Due to the complexity of the rules, Ralston felt that this game "is unlikely to attract a large audience." But he concluded, "Despite my reservations about the readability and complexity of the rules and procedures of Daredevils, it is the most comprehensive set of rules covering role-playing in the modern era, and shows great ingenuity in handling many gaming situations that are handled poorly or not at all by other systems. If the players avoid combat, the game plays smoothly and at a satisfying dramatic pace."

In the March 1983 edition of The Space Gamer (Issue No. 61), John Rankin commented that "Daredevils is a most interesting and satisfying game. Unless you didn't like the Aftermath/Bushido game system, at all, you should find Daredevils a more than adequate RPG to propel you into '30s action and adventure."

In Issue 27 of Abyss, Eric Olson noted "While the rules look complicated (and are to some degree) a few readings and a sample run clears up most problems." Olson also noted the complexity extended to character generation, which was "not a quick process." Despite this, Olson concluded, "Daredevils is probably the best 20s and 30s game on the market. If you ever wanted to play Sam Spade or Indiana Jones, this is the game for you."

In the December 1983 edition of Imagine (Issue 27), Paul Cockburn compared the game favorably to the earlier Gangbusters, and praised the realism of Daredevils in comparison to Call of Cthulhu. Cockburn also compared the game favorably to the adventures of Indiana Jones.

In the March 1983 edition of Different Worlds (Issue 27), Ken Rolston called the rules "artful, but frustratingly complex." He especially found the combat rules overly demanding, and as an example, took one-third of a page to outline all of the calculations needed to resolve one hit and its damage. While he praised the included scenarios for their investigative aspects, he had reservations about "the inherent weaknesses of '30's pulp fiction — implausible plots for heroes and villains in 'exotic' backgrounds." He warned gamemasters to be very familiar with the BCS rules before attempting combat, and concluded "There are many creative ideas in Daredevils, and it's a pleasurable evocation of the '30's adventure genres, but the rules are obscure and complex."

In Issue 16 of the French games magazine Casus Belli, Martin Latallo noted "The main driving force of Daredevils is a judicious use by the characters of their respective abilities at the appropriate time. On the other hand, special powers, such as a sense of danger, good luck or gadgets, make it possible to make the character a real hero." Latallo concluded, "Only one aspect of the game, in my opinion, should have been strengthened: the documentation on the 1930s... leaving the gamemaster to use their research ability."

In the March 1984 edition of White Dwarf (Issue 51), Marcus Rowland found the character generation system complex, and combat "very complicated, using a lot of modifiers and intricate calculations to establish the result of each shot or blow." He gave the game an above average overall rating of 8 out of 10, saying, "The rules system is slightly top-heavy, and I suspect many referees will simplify or abandon some of the more awkward areas... I'd not recommend the system to beginners, but more experienced referees won't have much trouble using it.

In his 1987 book, Role-Playing Mastery, Dungeons & Dragons co-creator E. Gary Gygax included both Daredevils and Bushido in his short list of notable role playing games.

In his 1990 book The Complete Guide to Role-Playing Games, game critic Rick Swan liked the game but found minor problems, noting "the inclusion of invisibility, hypnosis, and other extraordinary powers jars with the game's gritty realism." He also commented that "A few of the concepts, such as acquiring skills and handling non-player characters, are a little fuzzy ... and the combat system is still a little awkward." But Swan concluded by giving the game a rating of 3 out of 4, saying, "Overall, Daredevils successfully captures the flavor of the era and sets the stage for challenging pulp hero adventures."

== Other reviews ==
- Alarums & Excursions #163 (March 1989)
- StarDrive Vol. 1 Issue 1 (January 1988)
- Breakout! Issue 10 (1983)
- Sorcerer's Apprentice #16
- Analog Science Fiction and Fact

== Publications ==
- Daredevil Adventures Vol. 2 No. 1: Deadly Coins
- Daredevil Adventures Vol. 2 No. 2: The Menace Beneath the Sea
- Daredevil Adventures Vol. 2 No. 3: Supernatural Thrillers Issue
- Daredevil Adventures Vol. 2 No. 4: Lost World Tales
- Daredevil Adventures Vol. 3 No. 1: Nefarious Plots
