= Bunnies & Burrows =

1976 Tabletop fantasy role-playing game

- First edition cover
- Designers: B. Dennis Sustare, Scott Robinson
- Publishers: Fantasy Games Unlimited
- Publication: 1976; 50 years ago
- Genres: Animal fantasy
- Systems: Original

Bunnies & Burrows (B&B) is a role-playing game (RPG) inspired by the 1972 novel Watership Down. Published by Fantasy Games Unlimited in 1976, the game is centered on intelligent rabbits. It introduced several innovations to role-playing game design, being the first game to encourage players to have non-humanoid roles, and the first to have detailed martial arts and skill systems. Fantasy Games Unlimited published a second edition in 1982. Frog God Games published a revised third edition in 2019 from the original authors. The game was also modified and published by Steve Jackson Games as an official GURPS supplement in 1992.

As rabbits, player characters are faced with dangers mirroring those in the real world. The only true "monsters" in the game are humans, but there are many predators and natural hazards. The characters' position in the food chain promotes an emphasis on role-playing and problem solving over combat.

== History ==
Originally published by Fantasy Games Unlimited in 1976, only two years after the first role-playing game Dungeons & Dragons was published. The game was inspired by Richard Adams' fantasy novel Watership Down, and the players were given the opportunity to take on the role of rabbits. As such, the game emphasized role-playing over combat for, according to Steffan O'Sullivan, "You're playing a rabbit, after all – how much combat do you want to do?" David M. Ewalt, in his book Of Dice and Men, commented that Bunnies & Burrows "pushed setting even farther" than other early RPGs like Dungeons & Dragons and En Garde!, as the "player characters were intelligent rabbits and had to compete for food, avoid predators, and deal with internal warren politics".

It was the first role-playing game to allow for animal characters, and the first to have rules for martial arts.

Building on the first edition, in 1979, B. Dennis Sustare wrote "Different Worlds Present the World of Druid's Valley: A Bunnies & Burrows Campaign" in Different Worlds, a magazine published by Chaosium. It detailed how to combine the world of Bunnies & Burrows with other fantasy worlds. This was followed by the mini-adventure "The Jackrabbits' Lair", written by Daniel J. Maxfield, in Pegasus, a magazine published by Judges Guild.

A second edition of Bunnies & Burrows was printed in 1982 by Fantasy Games Unlimited, although the continuing popularity of the first edition is evidenced by how it was still being actively played in 2008.

During a rise of "retro" games in the late 1980s and early 1990s, Steve Jackson Games entered negotiations with Dennis Sustare and Scott Robinson, the current owners of the Bunnies & Burrows copyright, to publish an official GURPS supplement. In 1988, O'Sullivan wrote an unofficial conversion of Bunnies & Burrows to GURPS while the negotiations continued. He indicated that he hoped to one day work on the official supplement. GURPS Bunnies & Burrows was published in 1992.

The setting also had an unofficial conversion in 2004 to be used in Risus: The Anything RPG by Boyd Mayberry, under their "Rules for Free Fan-Supplements and Articles".

In 2019, Frog God Games released a third edition of the game after a successful Kickstarter campaign.

== Gameplay ==
The original game was very innovative for its time (less than two years after the first published RPG). Not only could you play non-humanoids for the first time, but it was the first role-playing game to have detailed martial arts rules, the first attempt at a skill system, and the first RPG to appeal as widely to women as to men.

Bunnies & Burrows was the first role-playing game to allow for non-humanoid play. In addition, it was also the first role-playing game to have detailed martial arts rules (renamed "Bun Fu" in GURPS Bunnies & Burrows) and the first attempt at a skill system. For its time, the game was considered by some "light years" ahead of the Original Dungeons & Dragons.

Players of Bunnies & Burrows take the role of rabbits as their player characters. Interaction with many different animal species is part of normal gameplay. Humans, whose thought processes and motivations are completely alien, are the only monster to be encountered.

Bunnies & Burrows has the advantage of offering players an intuitive grasp of relative dangers and appropriate actions not possible in game worlds that are substantially fictional. For example, a player is told their character is confronted with a fox. There is an immediate intuition on the amount of peril a rabbit is facing. Since player characters are substantially weaker than many of the dangers they face, the game is one of the first to encourage problem solving and outwitting obstacles, rather than out-fighting them.

The mechanics of the role-playing game system were created specifically for Bunnies & Burrows, common at the time of its original publishing. It features eight abilities and eight classes. The task resolution system is based on rolls of percentile dice. Although newer systems have updated game mechanics significantly, the ideas presented in Bunnies & Burrows created the framework for modern role-playing games.

== Reception ==
Steve Jackson reviewed Bunnies & Burrows in The Space Gamer No. 10. He concluded that "B & B is probably worth the retail price [...] at least to a FRP fan. The writing style is intelligent, lucid, and occasionally witty; the rules are workable [...] the art, as I think I pointed out, is so bad it's great; and the whole idea is appealing."

One commentator asserted that the game had "incredible role-playing potential", but the concept of role-playing rabbits can be viewed as bizarre, and as such they believed that most people thought it was stupid when it was first released.

James Davis Nicoll in 2020 for Black Gate said "In most games, the PCs are functionally apex predators. Not so in B. Dennis Sustare and Scott Robinson's Watership Down-inspired Bunnies and Burrows, in which you play a rabbit, a tasty, tasty rabbit. Filled with legitimately innovative game mechanics, it provided a combat system the rabbits were very ill-advised to use, as well as a skill system hampered only by the fact the rabbits were, well, as smart as rabbits. Human NPCs fill the Cosmic Horror niche: enigmatic, powerful, and deadly."

In his 2023 book Monsters, Aliens, and Holes in the Ground, RPG historian Stu Horvath noted, "B&B is the first game to push beyond the fantasy battle boundaries established by Dungeons & Dragons. This step [helped] the hobby arrive at the sort of indie games that focus on collaborative storytelling and lightweight, intuitive rules."

== Other reviews ==
- Fantastic Science Fiction v27 n10
- The Playboy Winner's Guide to Board Games

== Publications ==
=== Books ===
- Bunnies & Burrows (1976), Fantasy Games Unlimited
- Bunnies & Burrows (Second edition) (1982), Fantasy Games Unlimited
- Bunnies & Burrows (Third edition) (2019), Frog God Games

=== Articles ===
- Different Worlds Present the World of Druid's Valley: A Bunnies & Burrows Campaign (B. Dennis Sustare, 1979). Different Worlds, Chaosium.
- The Jackrabbits' Lair (Daniel J. Maxfield, 1982). Pegasus, Judges Guild.
