= Lands of Adventure =

Tabletop role-playing game

- Cover art by Bill Willingham
- Designers: Lee Gold
- Illustrators: Bill Willingham
- Publishers: Fantasy Games Unlimited
- Publication: 1983
- Genres: Historical fantasy

Lands of Adventure is a role-playing game published by Fantasy Games Unlimited (FGU) in 1983. Although similar to fantasy role-playing games in its scope, the suggested setting is historical rather than pure fantasy.

== Description ==
Lands of Adventure is a role-playing system designed for use with historical settings rather than fantasy worlds. The rules are "generic" — not tied to a specific game such as Dungeons & Dragons or RuneQuest. The game comes with two "Culture Packs" that give details of specific historical settings, specifically mythic Greece and medieval England.

Although players can create characters who are giants, elves, dwarves or animals, the emphasis is on human player characters, who advance by improving in their chosen skill areas. Magic is divided into types that correspond to character abilities. A priest must attract his deity's attention if he wants to perform a miracle.

== Publication history ==
Lands of Adventure was designed by Lee Gold, with a cover by Bill Willingham, and was published by FGU as a boxed set with a 32-page rulebook, a 28-page "Culture Pack", a sample character record sheet, and dice. As game critic Rick Swan noted, FGU's plan was to publish more Culture Packs for various historical eras, "However, the game drifted out of print before the concept could be fully explored, making Lands of Adventure a good idea that really never got off the ground."

== Reception ==
In Issue 58 of White Dwarf, Richard Clyne thought the biggest problem with the game rules was the treatment of skills. "The skills section is just a list of possible skills in each area... The rules would have been improved greatly if a chapter on skills had been included." Clyne found the rules on combat "strange, with some very simple elements e.g. all non-critical hits do the same amount of damage, and some complicated parts like the three types of 'hit points'." However, Clyne like the magic system, calling it the best part of the game. Clyne questioned the utility of the Culture Pack, pointing out that trying to summarize a lot of different cultures and how they can be used in the game in only 14 pages "completely useless; it contains very little information and what it does contain is mostly available from good reference books." Clyne concluded by giving the game an overall rating of 5 out of 10, writing, "Overall, I cannot see who the game is aimed at ... Coupled with the expensive price it is a classic case of far-too-little, far-too-late."

In Issue 36 of Different Worlds, Ian R. Beste commented "LOA has some problems, and while not one of them ruin the game as a whole, several combine to make it much less of an enjoyable game than it could be." Beste agreed with other reviewers that the skills system had problems, writing, "The rules for skills are well-intentioned but poorly executed." Beste suggested replacing the entire skills system with the system from Runequest. Beste found the combat rules "badly organized. They cannot be understood upon the first reading because the relevant rules are in seven different sections." Beste concluded, ""Lands of Adventure has a good idea ... that suffers from poor editing and some strange rules ... If you are willing, as the gamemaster, to put in the hours necessary to write up the skills, devise the spells, design the deities, fill in the background, design a few unique monsters, and write yourself a combat rules summary sheet, then get Lands of Adventure."

In Issue 71 of The Space Gamer, William A. Barton commented, "Lands of Adventure features several good ideas ... [but] does exhibit problems. Character generation is a bit too complex for my taste, as are some mechanics." Barton was in agreement with other critics about problems with the skills rules, noting, "Leaving specific skills up to the GM, except for some examples, is not a good idea." Despite this, Barton concluded, "for its Culture Packs alone [...] Lands of Adventure might prove a good buy for any FRPGers who don't consider themselves experts on the specific cultures covered. As for the game itself, Lee Gold admits in the introduction that it isn't the perfect FRPG. But then, what is?"

In Issue 24 of the British RPG magazine Imagine, Chris Hunter warned gamemasters "although a paragraph or so is given on each skill category there is no definitive listing of specialised skills so this means some extra work." Although Hunter liked the overall rules system, he noted, "Lands of Adventure is definitely not for the beginner ... as the amount of 'freedom' would almost certainly leave them floundering. If on the other hand you are a veteran gamer who enjoys perusing new games systems and has a few pounds to spare then this is a must." Hunter concluded on an ambivalent note, writing, "As for its chances as an individual rules system, I have grave reservations. The intention seems to be to publish several modular culture packs which means it's going to be very difficult to publish other 'support' such as modules. Consequently Lands of Adventure's chances of gaining a foothold with so many other systems on the market must be slim."

Dave Nalle, writing for Abyss, found the character generation rules "a bit confusing" and warned "Beginners would not get through the second page of the rules." Like other critics, Nalle had little good to say about the skills system, summarizing it as "potentially interesting, but somewhat confusing." Nalle liked the idea of the Culture Pack, but noted that it "serves as a good example of how to structure such as aid and the type of info to include, but a serious aid of this sort would need much more detail and more serious scholarly research." Nalle concluded by calling this "an intriguing and promising game ... Unfortunately, the rules are dreadfully confusing ... as it stands, it cannot touch its best potential market, slightly experienced gamers who are looking for their first serious, mature game."

In his 1990 book The Complete Guide to Role-Playing Games, game critic Rick Swan was a bit puzzled by some of the character generation rules, and found the combat and magic systems "adequate but routine." But the Culture Packs describing historical settings "is where Lands of Adventure really shines, containing scholarly, entertaining discussions of Greek and English settings that could be easily adapted into other role-playing systems." Swan concluded by giving the game a rating of 2.5 out of 4, saying, "While it's unlikely that the role-playing rules of Lands of Adventure will replace anybody's favorite fantasy game, the Culture Pack material might be worth a look for referees with an interest in the featured eras."
