= J. Hunter Johnson =

American game designer

J. Hunter Johnson (born January 8, 1969) is a freelance American game designer, author, and translator. He has translated many game rules and websites from German for Mayfair Games. He has authored or co-authored six books for Steve Jackson Games, including GURPS Monsters and GURPS Japan and designed two games for White Wolf Publishing, including gToons, which proved popular among children on Cartoon Network's Cartoon Orbit children's website and left an impact on how such websites use digital trading cards for online gaming.

== History ==
J. Hunter Johnson was born January 8, 1969, in Wichita, Kansas. At age ten, he was introduced to Dungeons & Dragons. That, combined with an exposure to Isaac Asimov and John M. Ford at the local library, led to his love of role-playing games.

In 1988, he was introduced to GURPS and became an active on USENET. While working on a list of GURPS supplements, he was contacted by Steve Jackson Games for some corrections. This eventually led to a job as the first coordinator of GURPS errata which he stayed at for five years. During his time at Steve Jackson Games, Johnson authored, co-authored, or contributed to seven books (see Bibliography below) for the company's GURPS role-playing game. He also served as development coordinator for the company's Knightmare Chess 2nd edition card game.

After leaving Steve Jackson Games, Johnson worked for White Wolf Publishing, where he designed gToons for the programmers at Cartoon Network. Prior to the introduction of gToons, the Cartoon Network's website, Cartoon Orbit, had implemented a system of offering collectible digital trading cards (called cToons) and providing a means of trading them with other users of the website. Introduced in October 2002, Cartoon Orbit's gToons took the digital trading cards concept and made it into a game, using new gToons cards, where website users could play each other head-to-head.

In 2013, Johnson had teamed up with a new development and business partner, Sebastian Chedal, and the pair introduced a new online game, called Quizgle.com. The original concept was Chedal's. "He does the interfacing and I have a background in database. He was looking for someone to do the back end of it," said Johnson in a 2013 interview. The game's interface displays results of a simulated web search, and the player tries to guess the search terms used to get the results shown. The game's online legal page describes the game as a tribute to Google while disclaiming any affiliation with them. The site reads, "Quizgle is a tribute to that daily experience we all share when we pull up our favorite search engine to ask the world a question." In June 2013, Johnson and Chedal were working on improvements in the game. As of August 2014, the game was still in beta, though some of the planned improvements had been implemented.

== Reception of Johnson's works ==
Johnson authored or co-authored several books for Steve Jackson Games. One of these books, GURPS Monsters, won a rating of A in a review published in Games Unplugged. John G. Snyder of gamingreport.com rated the book at 4 1/2 stars, saying, "You will be pleasantly surprised and not a little disturbed." Freelance writer Craig Oxbrow says in a 2001 review of the book for rpg.net, "GURPS Monsters is a wealth of ideas and inspiration for monsters as characters," and that it "will see use beyond the GURPS system." Kenneth Hite from Out of the Box reviewed Johnson's book GURPS Japan: beauty, terror, and adventure, 2nd ed. in 1999, concluding that "medieval Japan, broadly defined, is suddenly one of the most solidly playable milieux in gaming."

Johnson's gToons game proved popular among children, with more than 250,000 registered online users within the first month after the game's launch. The game was introduced in 2002, when the growth of Cartoon Network's website (Cartoon Orbit) traffic was far outpacing the Internet in general, yet the website was still lagging behind Nickelodeon. Cartoon Orbit was the first children's TV website to introduce digital trading cards related to their programming in 2000, but Nickelodeon surpassed them with a similar approach six months later. gToons was intended to help Cartoon Orbit regain their lead in internet traffic among children. After looking at early usage data for the game, Cartoon Network's Justin Williams commented, "Competition really is just as much of a community-builder as collaboration." Three months after gToons was released, Cartoon Network executives were planning spin-off products and merchandising from the game. At that same time, Nickelodeon announced that it too would also be launching games based on its digital trading cards. MIT professor Henry Jenkins said in an interview with USA Today regarding online card games associated with children's TV networks, "what Cartoon and Nick are doing is just an extension of the Pokémon phenomenon."

In a 2013 review of the beta version of Quizgle.com, freelance writer Danielle Coots wrote "With its innovative mind challengers, it is sure to have its visitors stumped at times." She further described the game as "cool, clever, and fun," and also "easy to navigate."

== Bibliography ==
=== Author ===
- GURPS WWII: Frozen Hell
- GURPS Monsters
- GURPS Japan: beauty, terror, and adventure, 2nd ed. with Lee Gold
- GURPS Bestiary: monsters, beasts, and companions, 3rd ed. with Steffan O'Sullivan
- GURPS Compendium II: Combat and Campaigns, Contributor, with Sean Barrett, Walter Milliken, Sean Michael Punch, Brett Slocum
- GURPS Magic, 3rd ed, Contributor, with eighteen others
- GURPS Who's Who 1, Contributor, with 28 others

=== Design ===
- Exalted Card Game, White Wolf Publishing
- GToons
- Button Men: Bruno! (self-published) with Dan Smith
- Quizgle.com with Sebastian Chedal

=== Magazine articles ===
- "The Much-Maligned Will", Pyramid, Issue #9
- "Up Front", Fire & Movement #133
- "Chrome Berets in the One-and-Twenty" in Pyramid #15
- "Terra Incognita: Cambiare (Tempest I)" in Pyramid Online, December 31, 1999
- "Banestorming Infinity Unlimited" in Pyramid Online, June 19, 1998
- "New World War" variant in Pyramid Online, January 29, 1999
- "Fudgers of Catan" variant in Pyramid Online, July 30, 1999

=== Magazine reviews ===
- Review of Tenjo by WhySpire? Games, Fire & Movement #130.
- Review of Samurai & Katana by Clash of Arms, Fire & Movement #130.
- Review of U.S. Patent No. 1 by Cheapass Games, Fire & Movement #131.
- Review of The Deep by Mystic Eye Games, Pyramid Online 8/20/04.
- Review of Doge by Rio Grande Games, Moves #108.
- Review of Zero! by GMT Games, Fire & Movement #126.
- Review of Chrononauts by Looney Labs, Moves #107.
- Review of The Cities & Knights of Catan by Mayfair Games, Moves #107.
- Review of Knights Brave and Bold by Eurogames Descartes, Moves #107.
- Review of Dragon's Gold by Eurogames Descartes, Moves #107.
- Review of Advanced Squad Leader, Second Edition by Multi-Man Publishing, Fire & Movement #125.
- Review of The Ashes of Empire by Udo Grebe Gamedesign, Moves #106.
- The Apprentice (Clash of Arms) review in Moves #105
- Thieves of Bagdad (Clash of Arms) review in Moves #104.
- Tales of Ulysse (Clash of Arms) review in Moves #104
- The Great Brain Robbery (Cheapass Games) review in Moves #104
- Button Men: Fantasy (Cheapass Games) review in Moves #104
- Wizard Kings (Columbia Games) review in Moves #103
- Lord of the Fries De-Lux (Cheapass Games) review in Moves #103
- Battle Line (GMT Games) review in Moves #102
- Through the Desert (Fantasy Flight Games) review in Moves #102
- King of the Elves (Rio Grande Games) review in Moves #102
- Dry Gulch (Hangman Games) review in Pyramid Online 8/13/99
- Monsters Ravage America (Avalon Hill) review in Pyramid Online 7/17/98
- A Magical Medley (Grey Ghost Press) contributor, review in Pyramid #28

=== Translations ===
- Anno 1503, Mayfair Games
- Barbarossa, Catan LLC
- Catan Online, Castle Hill Studios
- Encycolopedia Catanica, Part 1, Catan LLC
- Farb Flitzer, Piatnik
- Starship Catan, Mission 3: The Diplomatic Station, Mayfair Games
- The Kids of Catan, Mayfair Games.
- The Settlers of Catan Card Game, Mayfair Games
- The Settlers of Catan Travel Edition, Mayfair Games
- Domaine, Mayfair Games.
- The Settlers of the Stone Age, Mayfair Games
- Nautilus, Mayfair Games
- Die Siedler von Catan: Das Buch zum Spielen, Kosmos
- Gold Rausch (Hans im Glück)
