= Aftermath! =

Post-apocalyptic tabletop role-playing game

- Designers: Paul Hume; Robert N. Charrette
- Publishers: Fantasy Games Unlimited
- Publication: 1981; 45 years ago
- Genres: Post-apocalyptic fiction
- Systems: Original
- Players: 2 to 6

Aftermath! is a post-apocalyptic role-playing game created by Paul Hume and Robert Charette and published in 1981 by Fantasy Games Unlimited. It was promoted with the line: “Is it the sunset of the Earth or the sunrise of a brave new world?”

It is set in a world in which the characters fight for food, water, basic supplies, and shelter.

The nature of the apocalypse is up to the game master. Expansions introduce magic, extend technological options such as space travel, and provide practical survival information alongside additional rules and bestiary content.

== Game design ==
Aftermath! is one of several games designed by Hume and Charrette, whose first production was Bushido. At the time, Aftermath! was praised for its adherence to real-world facts. Character creation emphasized building an in-depth portrayal of a survivor capable of enduring life 20 years after the Ruin of civilization.

Attributes, abilities, talents, and skills are used to create characters. Six attributes – Wit (WT), Will (WL), Strength (STR), Deftness (DFT), Speed (SPD), and Health (HLH) – each have three values: Permanent Rating, Ability Saving Throw (AST), and Critical Saving Throw (CST). Talents include – Charismatic, Combative, Communicative, Esthetic, Mechanical, Natural, and Scientific. Both Attributes and Talents are used to generate a Skill's initial score. Attributes are used to calculate Abilities, which control some of the basic mechanics used in the game, such as Base Action Phase (SPD AST). Talents serve multiple functions – helping with progression in skills, can be used as the Basic Chance of Success (BCS) as the “Governing Talent” for a Skill, and a high Talent may have a Special Talent Ability. Talents make up what is called the Character's Psychological Profile.

The Game Master (GM) gives each player Development Points, in which to buy skills and attribute increase points, which may be used to add to the Attributes. Attributes are also assigned points to divide between them.

Any skill (including combat skills) uses the BCS to complete a Task, which may require an Effect Die roll to determine extent of success. During the Detailed Action Time (DAT), used normally during combat, the GM rolls for hit location (there are 30) on a D100 after the player rolls a hit, then rolls are made for damage. A melee weapon, uses the character's STR Group Effect Die as its damage dice. Missile weapons such as Bows, use the Bow's Pound Pull, to determine damage. Firearms use the Bullet Damage Group based on the weapons real world Muzzle Energy to determine damage. Explosives have their own set of rules.

Other systems in the game help define survival conditions and how these conditions may affect the Character. There are complex rules for determining the effects of disease, radiation, and Encumbrance. Armor (includes clothing) can be fit piecemeal on any of the 30 locations for the body. There are rules for creating weapons and the Skills needed to create them. There is also a bartering system.

== Contents ==
Original boxed contents:

- three rulebooks - Basic Rules, Player's Guide, and Gamemaster's Guide
- introductory scenario
- character sheet
- three panel reference sheet (tables and charts)
- counters, and a feedback sheet

== Reception ==
William A. Barton reviewed Aftermath in The Space Gamer No. 43. Barton commented that "If your taste in RPGs tends toward simplicity or to systems that are easily playable without a lot of work, you'll surely want to pass up Aftermath, and stick to Gamma World or The Morrow Project. If you thrive on complexity, countless calculations and mounds of information, Aftermath will give you that - and more."

Like its sibling, Bushido, Aftermath! gained a number of very positive reviews on its publication. In the Open Box feature of White Dwarf #34, Andy Slack gave the game a 10/10, comparing it favourably to both Bushido and The Morrow Project RPG.

It received similar positive treatment in the pages of the short-lived Imagine magazine. The reviewer compared it favorably to Mad Max but disliked the use of Australia because it would not be well-known to North American or European players and suggested moving it to a more familiar location. Baylis also compares the game to The Morrow Project and gives the adventure included a positive review.

However, Thomas Grant, writing for Different Worlds, was disappointed in the level of violence in the game, saying, "Although violence is gratuitous in RPGs there are parameters of context and quantity which Aftermath! seems to overstep. [The game] practically exults in its morbid meticulousness with every minutiae of killing." Given the 2-page flowchart to explain combat, Grant pointed out, "The unfortunate consequence of all this painstaking attention to detail is that the combat system has sacrificed playability for realism." He also criticized the organization of material, saying "little effort has been made to organize the rules and make them easily indexed. Aftermath! ... is a paragon of bad organization: the combat system is sprawled across all three books, and some of the information necessary for the player's design of their characters is in sections marked, 'Gamesmasters Only!'" Grant concluded, "Aftermath! as an idea has enormous potential; Aftermath! as a game buries its potential beneath a mountain of ultra-detailed combat rules, and it is up to the individual GM to make up for the gross inadequacies of the game taken at face value. The important question for anyone considering Aftermath! is, 'Is it worth the effort?'"

In his 1990 book The Complete Guide to Role-Playing Games, game critic Rick Swan called this game "an interesting premise, but somewhere along the way, the game lost focus. Instead of exploring the rich possibilities of a postapocalyptic setting, Aftermath bogs down in a mire of rules, resulting in a game so complicated that it's nearly unplayable." Swan also felt that "there's an uncomfortable preoccupation with violence ... with virtually every facet of combat rendered in excruciating detail." Given the level of violence, Swan pointed out that the characters are not particularly robust "which is a big drawback in a game as violence-prone as Aftermath. A well-placed shot from a sniper or a bite from a poison cookie can instantly wipe out a character that it took a couple of hours to create." Swan concluded by giving the game a below-average rating of 2 out of 4, saying, "Though its drawbacks are many, Aftermath is paradise for players who thrive on detail or for thos who want to wring every last drop of blood out of combat encounters. But for thos emore interested in role-playing that in staging detailed fights, wading through the two-hundred-plus pages of Aftermath rules is hardly worth the effort."

Phil Clare retrospectively reviewed Aftermath! for Arcane magazine and stated that "The whole game is designed in a very logical manner and you'll rarely hear a player complaining about interpretation of the rules, though it's still very easy to get bogged down in calculating the effects of a .22 bullet hitting you in the shoulder through a studded leather jacket on the second Friday of the month etc. Nevertheless, the complexity of combat resolution is really the only downside to the game. The rest is an absorbing battle for survival in a desolate wasteland. This game was well ahead of its time and I for one would love to see it re-released and well supported - it certainly deserves it."

In a 1996 readers' poll conducted by the UK games magazine Arcane to determine the 50 most popular role-playing games, Aftermath was ranked 29th. Editor Paul Pettengale commented: "Aftermath can be a harrowing game. Still, in the hands of a decent ref, it can also be one of the most involving to come out of the pre-1985 boom, with plenty of scope for freeform campaigns."

== Reviews ==
- Game News #10 (Dec., 1985)

== Scenarios ==
A number of add-on scenario and campaign books were published. Because of the detailed rules, it was possible to build extremely detailed and believable worlds around actual places, such as Sydney University, where for example every room in the university was modeled with lengthy descriptions of items in each room, and maps based on actual university blueprints.

- Aftermath Scenario Pack 1: Into The Ruins - The City of Littleton (1981), by Robert N. Charrette and Paul R. Hume. Published by Fantasy Games Unlimited. Takes place in the city of Littleton, Illinois.
- Aftermath Scenario Pack A1: Operation Morpheus - The Ruins of the University (1982), by Phil McGregor. Published by Fantasy Games Unlimited. Takes place in Australia centered on Sydney University
- Aftermath Campaign Pack A2 - Sydney, The Wilderness (1984), by Phil McGregor. Published by Fantasy Games Unlimited. Sydney region.
- Adventure Pack K1 - The Empire of Karo (1984), by William Pixley. Published by Fantasy Games Unlimited. Set in Cairo, Illinois.
- Aftermath Campaign Pack C1 - The City State, Chicago & The Illinois River Valley (1987), by J. Andrew Keith. Published by Fantasy Games Unlimited.
- Aftermath! Technology (1992), by David S. Harmer. Published by Dinosaur Games. Rules expansion and technology supplement.
- Aftermath! Technology (2008), by David S. Harmer. 2nd edition Published by Fantasy Games Unlimited. Rules expansion and technology supplement.
- Aftermath! Survival Guide (2008), by David S. Harmer. Published by Fantasy Games Unlimited. Rules expansion and technology supplement covering roleplaying during the collapse.
- Aftermath! - The Lost Adventures (2009), is a reprint of Aftermath Scenario Pack A1: Operation Morpheus - The Ruins of the University and Adventure Pack K1 - The Empire of Karo in a single volume.
- Aftermath! Magic! (2010), by David S. Harmer. 2nd edition Published by Fantasy Games Unlimited. Magic rules expansion and campaign supplement. Covers playing after a Magical collapse.
- Aftermath! Asteroid Cybele: The American Wasteland, By David S. Harmer and Eddie Johnson - Campaign pack set 20 years after an asteroid hits the planet. Covers the United States. This is the largest campaign pack ever published by FGU for Aftermath! The first campaign book in the connected Cybele campaign.
- Aftermath: Asteroid Cybele: Lords of London, by Stephen Dedman. The London area after the collapse.
- Aftermath! Asteroid Cybele: The Wild West, by Stephen Dedman. Southwest Australia in the Cybele campaign.
- Aftermath! Asteroid Cybele: The Fleet, by David S. Harmer. The surviving US fleet, traveling the world, and finding a "Lost Island" of adventures and bio-engineering. This campaign pack ties the other Cybele campaigns together.
- Aftermath! Asteroid Cybele: Prague, by David S. Harmer. Announced European campaign pack for the Cybele campaign. Release postponed to 2021.
