= Bushido Gamemaster's Screen =

Bushido Gamemaster's Screen is a 1980 role-playing game supplement published by Phoenix Games for Bushido.

== Contents ==
Bushido Gamemaster's Screen is a supplement in which a cardstock screen includes information for players on the reverse side, providing quick reference during gameplay.

== Publication history ==
Bushido Gamemaster's Screen was published by Phoenix Games in 1980 as a cardstock screen.

Shannon Appelcline explained that "Phoenix Games' most memorable contribution to the industry, however, was their publication of the second edition of Bushido (1980), an Oriental RPG by Paul Hume and Bob Charrette [...] Following a GM screen for Bushido (1980), Phoenix Games too closed up house."
