= GURPS Monsters =

Role-playing game supplement

- Designers: Hunter Johnson
- Publishers: Steve Jackson Games
- Publication: 2002; 24 years ago
- Genres: Horror
- Systems: GURPS
- ISBN: 1-55634-518-6

GURPS Monsters is a 128-page soft-bound book compiled by J. Hunter Johnson and published in 2002 by Steve Jackson Games as a supplement for the GURPS role-playing game system. It contains biographies and gaming statistics for forty-eight monsters for various campaign settings.

== Contents ==
=== A Mythological Menagerie ===
- Amenhotep the Mummy, an undead pharaoh
- Asterius the Minotaur, half-man, half-bull
- Curupira, a Tupi protector of the forest
- The Golem, the Jewish legend of a clay man
- The Great Leech of Tlanusi'yi, a 350-foot worm
- Lilith, Adam's first wife
- La Llorona, the Weeping Woman of the Rio Grande
- Medusa, a woman with a petrifying gaze
- Scylla, a six-headed dog-woman
- Tiamat, the Sumerian dragon-goddess
- Yama Uba, a Japanese witch

=== The Cryptozoo ===
- The Beast of Le Gévaudan, a giant wolf
- Bigfoot, a shy simian biped
- El Chupacabra, the Puerto Rican goat-sucker
- The Great Sphinx, the guardian of Egypt
- The Honey Island Swamp Monster, the Louisiana Wookiee
- Hughes De Camp-D'Avesnes, French 11th-century nobleman and werewolf
- The Jersey Devil, a hoofed, winged near-man
- The Mothman, the prophetic insectoid creature
- Specimen Alpha-39, an intelligent sewer alligator
- Spring Heeled Jack, a red-eyed, leaping trickster

=== Legends of Literature ===
- The Big Bad Wolf, a cautionary tale about carnality
- The Doppelgänger, an identity-stealing manipulator
- Dracula, the world's most celebrated vampire
- Frankenstein's Monster, Mary Shelley's famous creation
- Geryon, a demon from Dante's Inferno
- Grendel, arch-enemy of Beowulf
- Headless Horseman, the pumpkin-headed Hessian mercenary
- The Phantom of the Opera, a deformed but cultured man
- The Queen of Air and Darkness, a cold-hearted faerie
- Shub-Internet, a Lovecraftian transdimensional entity suffusing the internet

=== Original Monsters ===
- Barclay Thormon, the disembodied brain of a cruel businessman
- Benny the Fox, a sadistic cartoon come to life
- Elrond Carver, a radioactive gangster for GURPS Technomancer
- Gill Man, an homage to the Creature from the Black Lagoon
- Hachi-Otoko, a man-shaped swarm of bees
- Harvester, a gigantic, hungry mass of writhing tentacles
- Ixis, a shapeshifting imposter for a fantasy campaign
- Leatherjacket, a dismembered killer held together by his harness
- Leviathan, a conglomeration of many human victims
- Lord K'Han the Giant Ape, inspired by King Kong
- The Maylum Spirit, a vicious ghost trapped in an insane asylum
- Pusan Chen, an undead dragon
- Special Agent Thomas Johnson, a Man in Black like Agent Smith
- Stitches the Patchwork Clown, a murderous doll
- Sylvia Sternenkind, a beautiful bioroid serial-killer for GURPS Transhuman Space
- Tamok the Conqueror, a telepathic leader of an alien space fleet
- The Woodbury Blob, inspired by The Blob

== Publication history ==
GURPS Monsters is a 128-page soft-bound book compiled by J. Hunter Johnson and published in 2002 by Steve Jackson Games as a supplement for the GURPS role-playing game system.

=== Writer/compiler ===
Hunter Johnson is a freelance game designer, author, and translator. He has translated many game rules and websites from German for Mayfair Games. He authored or co-authored six books for Steve Jackson Games, including GURPS Monsters, GURPS WWII: Frozen Hell, and the second edition of GURPS Japan. Johnson served for five years as the first coordinator of GURPS errata for Steve Jackson Games. He has also designed a few computer games, including gToons for Cartoon Network. (published by White Wolf Publishing) and Quizgle.com.

== Reception ==
GURPS Monsters won a rating of A in a review published in Games Unplugged. John G. Snyder of gamingreport.com rated the book at 4 1/2 stars, saying, "You will be pleasantly surprised and not a little disturbed." Freelance writer Craig Oxbrow says in a 2001 review of the book for rpg.net, "GURPS Monsters is a wealth of ideas and inspiration for monsters as characters," and that it "will see use beyond the GURPS system."

== See also ==
Other GURPs publications
