= BattleTech: Wolves on the Border =

Novel by Robert N. Charrette

- Author: Robert N. Charrette
- Cover artist: Jim Holloway
- Language: English
- Series: BattleTech
- Publisher: Roc Books
- Publication date: March 1989 (original); May 1996 (reprint)
- ISBN: 0-451-45388-3

Wolves on the Border is a novel by Robert N. Charrette published by ROC in 1989, and again in 1996.

== Plot summary ==
Wolves on the Border is a BattleTech novel set in the 3020s about the Mechwarrior named Minobu Tetsuhara, who is also a Samurai of the Draconis Combine, and the Wolf's Dragoons mercenary unit.

== Reception ==
Andy Butcher reviewed Wolves on the Border for Arcane magazine, rating it a 7 out of 10 overall. Butcher comments that "Wolves On The Border compares very favourably to Charrette's Shadowrun novels, effectively capturing the atmosphere of the Battletech universe."
