= GURPS Operation Endgame =

Role-playing game supplement

- Cover art by John Zeleznik
- Designers: Thomas Kane
- Publishers: Steve Jackson Games
- Publication: December 1993; 33 years ago
- Genres: Multiple
- Systems: GURPS third edition

GURPS Operation Endgame is a book of espionage-themed adventures published by Steve Jackson Games (SJG) in 1993 for use with the GURPS (Generic Universal Role-Playing System) third edition rules.

== Plot summary ==
GURPS Operation Endgame features four adventures, which can be played as four separate adventures, or linked to form a longer campaign:

- "Operation Endgame": In the final days of the Soviet Union, the player characters must persuade a Soviet agent codenamed Midnight to defect before assassins find her.
- "Operation Loose Ends": The agents must hunt down the final six operatives of a Soviet assassination squad.
- "Watching the Dragon": The agents must investigate Chinese interest in the Soviet assassins and their weapons stockpile.
- "Sons of the Bear": The agents must intervene in Kazakhstan before a deadly environmental weapons can be unleashed on the world.

== Publication history ==
Thomas Kane wrote GURPS Espionage in 1992, a sourcebook that set out rules and equipment for spy-based role-playing campaigns using the third edition of GURPS. The following year, Kane wrote GURPS Operation Endgame, four adventures that used the rules set out in GURPS Espionage. The 128-page softcover book was illustrated by Dan Smith and Doug Shuler, with cover art by John Zeleznik, and published by SJG in 1993 for use with the third edition of GURPS.

== Reviews ==
In the July 1993 edition of Dragon (Issue #207), Rick Swan recalled the stellar work done by Thomas Kane in GURPS Espionoage, "a superb treatment of international intrigue." He likewise admired this book, calling the adventures "heart-thumping plots worthy of Ian Fleming." Swan concluded with a strong recommendation, saying "the adventures feature enough realistic detail to make them convincing, and enough Hollywood gimmickry to keep them fun."
