= Takishido's Debt =

Takishido's Debt is a 1983 role-playing game adventure published by Games of Liverpool for Bushido.

== Plot summary ==
Takishido's Debt is an adventure in which the player characters are hired to rescue the daughter of a daimyo held in the lodge of another lord and leave a double in her place.

== Publication history ==
Takishido's Debt was written by Steve Bell and published by Games of Liverpool (U.K.) in 1983 as a 12-page book.

== Reviews ==
- Pläi Beck (Heft 15 - Feb 1986)
