= GURPS Swashbucklers =

Tabletop role-playing game

Roleplaying in the world of pirates and musketeers
- Fist edition cover art by Jean Elizabeth Martin, 1988
- Designers: Steffan O'Sullivan
- Publishers: Steve Jackson Games
- Publication: 1988; 38 years ago
- Systems: GURPS

GURPS Swashbucklers is a sourcebook by Steffan O'Sullivan, published by Steve Jackson Games in 1988 to provide a swashbuckling setting for GURPS (Generic Universal Role-Playing System).

== Contents ==
GURPS Swashbucklers is a GURPS supplement containing special rules for campaigns involving musketeer and pirate characters, including an overview of the years 1559-1815, and rules for sailing ships. In his 1991 book Heroic Worlds, Lawrence Schick noted that the book includes "such helpful sections as 'How to be French.'".

== Publication history ==
GURPS Swashbucklers, a 96-page softcover book, was written by Steffan O'Sullivan, with a cover by Jean Elizabeth Martin and illustrations by Donna Barr, and was published by Steve Jackson Games (SJG) in 1988. In 1989, SJG published a second edition designed by Steffan O'Sullivan, with 96-pages. In 1999, they published a third edition designed by Russell Godwin, Brian J. Maloney and Steffan O'Sullivan, with 128-pages.

The "Denizens" series for GURPS Dungeons Fantasy also included a Swashbucklers book.

In his 2011 book Designers & Dragons, games historian Shannon Appelcline noted that GURPS Swashbucklers was one of the smaller subgenre books published after the first broad genre GURPS books.

== Reception ==
In the December 1989 edition of Dragon (Issue #152, Jim Bambra said: "Extensive background notes define the historical setting, but they fall short of really bringing the fictional worlds of pirates and Musketeers to life. As a basis for establishing swashbuckling campaigns it does a good job, but more detailed development of the individual settings is really needed to bring out the true potential of the genre."

In the April 1989 edition of Games International (Issue 4), James Wallis called the cover art and interior illustrations "amateurish", but lauded the "sheer density of background information." He noted that the "Adventures" section was only two pages long, containing "four lacklustre brief outlines, all requiring much work before being playable in any form." He also felt that both the "Swashbuckling" and "Pirate" chapters contained too much information about famous characters and not enough "actual day-to-day life." Wallis gave the book an average rating of 3.5 out of 5, saying, "In sticking too closely to the factual, Steffan O'Sullivan lets the romantic atmosphere of life in the French court or on the open seas escape [...] GURPS Swashbucklers is not swashbuckling enough."

== See also ==
- Other GURPs publications
