= GURPS Bunnies & Burrows =

Tabletop role-playing game supplement for GURPS

- Designers: Steffan O'Sullivan
- Publishers: Steve Jackson Games
- Publication: 1992; 34 years ago
- Genres: Animal fantasy
- Systems: GURPS

GURPS Bunnies & Burrows is a GURPS sourcebook for the Bunnies & Burrows game. Steffan O'Sullivan adapted the original game to GURPS, and it was published by Steve Jackson Games in 1992.

== Contents ==
GURPS Bunnies & Burrows adapted the GURPS rules to support playing intelligent rabbits, inspired by the 1972 novel Watership Down. Steffan O'Sullivan, who adapted GURPS Bunnies & Burrows notes, "The game has also been published as a GURPS supplement, but I usually play it in Fudge these days - the simpler rules seem to work better for this genre in particular. I've also run it in Sherpa, which is oddly evocative of the original rules."

== Publication history ==
During a rise of "retro" games in the late 1980s and early 1990s, Steve Jackson Games entered negotiations with Dennis Sustare and Scott Robinson, the current owners of the Bunnies & Burrows copyright, to publish an official GURPS supplement. In 1988, O'Sullivan wrote an unofficial conversion of Bunnies & Burrows to GURPS while the negotiations continued. He indicated that he hoped to one day work on the official supplement.

GURPS Bunnies & Burrows was published in 1992. It was written by O'Sullivan with interior art by Jim Groat. GURPS Bunnies & Burrows was the first game world that Steve Jackson Games adapted to GURPS in the early 1990s. The book is now out of print, but (as of July 2015) is still available via digital download. Loyd Blankenship, the managing editor of Steve Jackson Games' former Illuminati BBS, acknowledged that O'Sullivan received his wish, and kept the original conversion article online. Steve Jackson Games continues to support the game, releasing an updated errata sheet in 2007.

== Reception ==
Shane L. Hensley reviewed GURPS Bunnies and Burrows in White Wolf #35 (March/April, 1993), rating it a 5 out of 5 and stated that "For those unfamiliar with the original, Fantasy Games Unlimited originally published Bunnies and Burrows in 1976. The game was and is loosely inspired by Richard Adams' Watership Down. O'Sullivan has captured the sometimes serious, sometimes light-hearted nature of the subject and turned it into what I consider one of the best sourcebooks of the year."

Lev Lafayette says that it is "really hard to fault GURPS Bunnies & Burrows", as it is educational, realistic, whimsical and clever, while the game has also been described as a "work of genius".

== See also ==
- List of GURPS publications
