= GURPS Japan =

1988 supplement for the GURPS role-playing game

GURPS Japan first edition
Roleplaying in the world of the shogunate
- Designers: Lee Gold
- Publishers: Steve Jackson Games
- Publication: 1988; 38 years ago
- Genres: Feudal Japan
- Systems: GURPS

GURPS Japan is a feudal Japanese sourcebook for the GURPS (Generic Universal Role-Playing System), written by Lee Gold, and first published by Steve Jackson Games in 1988. A second edition was published in 1999.

== Authors ==
GURPS Japan second edition
Beauty, terror, and adventure
- Designers: Lee Gold; Hunter Johnson
- Publishers: Steve Jackson Games
- Publication: 1999; 27 years ago
- Genres: Feudal Japan
- Systems: GURPS third edition

Lee Gold is an author, editor, game designer, and filk musician. Gold was the sole author of the first edition of GURPS Japan. Hunter Johnson is a freelance game designer, author, and translator. He has translated many game rules and websites from German for Mayfair Games. He authored, co-authored, or contributed to seven books for Steve Jackson Games (SJG), including GURPS Monsters and the second edition of GURPS Japan. He served for five years as the first coordinator of GURPS errata for the company. Johnson expanded and revised Gold's work into its second edition.

== Contents ==
GURPS Japan is a GURPS rules supplement for adventuring in feudal Japan, including character creation rules.

== Publication history ==
GURPS Japan: Roleplaying in the World of the Shogunate, was written by Lee Gold, with art by Guy Burchak, and was published by SJG in 1988 as a 112-page book.

A second edition, GURPS Japan: Beauty, Terror, and Adventure, was revised and expanded to 128 pages by Hunter Johnson, and was published by SJG in November 1999. It was written by Gold and Johnson, with art by Burchak and Theo Black, and is compatible with the third edition of the GURPS.

GURPS Japan was the first in the series of historical sourcebooks from Steve Jackson Games, and one of the smaller subgenre books published after the first broad genre GURPS books.

== Reception ==
Strategicon convention manager and game critic Eric M. Aldrich I said in his review of the first edition:

For what it covers there are few, if any, gaming books that do so that are this well written. The major criticism I have is that it doesn't cover enough! But 112 pages is enough to scratch the surface. If one is interested in the eras in question, it's worth the price of admission.

Kenneth Hite reviewed the second edition and said, "Sengoku and L5R RPG players and GMs can both get a lot out of this book," adding that "medieval Japan, broadly defined, is suddenly one of the most solidly playable milieux in gaming."

== Reviews ==
- Casus Belli #84 (Dec 1994)

== See also ==
- List of GURPS publications
