= Shadowrun: Just Compensation =

1995 novel by Robert N. Charrette

Shadowrun: Just Compensation is a novel by Robert N. Charrette published by Roc Fantasy in 1995.

== Plot summary ==
Just Compensation is a Shadowrun novel in which a young employee of the Telestrian Corporation named Andy wants to become a famous shadowrunner.

== Reception ==
Andy Butcher reviewed Shadowrun: Just Compensation for Arcane magazine, rating it a 4 out of 10 overall. Butcher comments that "There are some good ideas here [...] and an interesting look at some of the politics of 2057 America - something that has generally been neglected. All the same, only dedicated fans of the game world will be willing to trudge through the rest of the book to find these insights."

== Review ==
- Australian Realms #28
