= Scenario Pack 1: Into the Ruins - The City of Littleton =

Tabletop role-playing game supplement

Scenario Pack 1: Into the Ruins - The City of Littleton is a 1981 role-playing game adventure for Aftermath! published by Fantasy Games Unlimited.

== Plot summary ==
Scenario Pack 1: Into the Ruins - The City of Littleton is a scenario pack involving the city of Littleton.

== Publication history ==
Into the Ruins was written by Bob Charrette and Paul Hume, and published by Fantasy Games Unlimited in 1981 as a 28-page book.

== Reception ==
William A. Barton reviewed Into the Ruins in The Space Gamer No. 43. Barton commented that "Overall, Into the Ruins is well-done and should add greatly to any Aftermath campaign."
