= MSPE Character Folder =

Role-playing game supplement

MSPE Character Folder is a 1984 role-playing game supplement published by Flying Buffalo for Mercenaries, Spies and Private Eyes.

== Contents ==
MSPE Character Folder are a pack of 20 character sheets that fold up to form a wallet, and can be used to record notes and clues.

== Reception ==
W.G. Armintrout reviewed MSPE Character Folder in Space Gamer No. 67. Armintrout commented that "I'm not usually one to go gaga about character sheets, but these are good – they give you somewhere to put things and fold down to a convenient size."

== Reviews ==
- Dragon #94 (Feb., 1985)
