= Ident-A-Kit Set 1: Fingerprints =

Ident-A-Kit Set 1: Fingerprints is a 1987 role-playing game supplement published by Sleuth Publications for Mercenaries, Spies & Private Eyes.

== Contents ==
Ident-A-Kit Set 1: Fingerprints is a supplement in which guidelines are provided to allow fingerprints to be used as game aids, and includes peel-and-stick prints, and a 3x magnifier.

== Publication history ==
Ident-A-Kit Set 1: Fingerprints was written by Gary Grady and William Lamb and published by Sleuth Publications in 1987 as a boxed set containing a 16-page book, a 4-page pamphlet, 10 cards, 250 peel-and-stick prints, and a magnifier.

Shannon Appelcline notes that Sleuth Publications purchasing the Mercenaries, Spies & Private Eyes product line from Flying Buffalo in 1986 "led to Sleuth's first non-Different Worlds publication for the RPG industry: a new, boxed edition of Mercenaries, Spies & Private Eyes (1986). It was soon followed by their only supplement, Ident-a-kit 1: Fingerprints (1986) which rather uniquely gave players the opportunity to match up real-looking fingerprints in their roleplaying games."

== Reception ==
Lawrence Schick referred to Ident-A-Kit Set 1: Fingerprints as "Pretty cool."
