= Valley of the Mists =

Tabletop role-playing game adventure

Valley of the Mists is a 1982 role-playing game adventure published by Fantasy Games Unlimited for Bushido.

== Contents ==
Valley of the Mists is an adventure package which includes three scenarios set in the Hida Province of Nippon.

== Publication history ==
Valley of the Mists is the first adventure scenario ever published for Bushido, and was designed using the 2nd edition game rules.

== Reception ==
William A. Barton reviewed Valley of the Mists in The Space Gamer No. 54. Barton commented that "Valley of the Mists is a strong starter as the first Bushido adventure. If subsequent efforts are as well-done, Bushido aficionados will have much to look forward to in upcoming excursions through Nippon."

Mike Polling reviewed Valley of the Mists for White Dwarf #32, giving it an overall rating of 10 out of 10, and stated that "Rarely have I come across a module so carefully and lovingly worked out, and so exciting. playing this has been one of the high points of my role-playing and games-mastering career."

Anders Swenson reviewed Valley of the Mists for Different Worlds magazine and stated that "Valley of the Mists is an excellent companion to Bushido. With work, it can be converted to other systems, but why bother? Bushido is the closest yet to an enjoyable adventure gaming system for the Oriental fan, and Valley of the Mists is a good scenario to begin a campaign."
