= GURPS Bestiary =

1998 supplement for the GURPS role-playing game

- First edition cover by Ken Kelly
- Designers: First edition; Steffan O'Sullivan; Second edition; Chris McCubbin; Bob Schroeck; Third edition; Hunter Johnson
- Publishers: Steve Jackson Games
- Publication: 1988 first edition; 1994 second edition; 2000 third edition
- Genres: Universal role-playing system
- Systems: GURPS

GURPS Bestiary is a sourcebook for the GURPS (Generic Universal Role-Playing System), originally written by Steffan O'Sullivan, and published by Steve Jackson Games in 1988. It is a bestiary of mundane and fantastical creatures for use with GURPS.

== Contents ==
GURPS Bestiary is a bestiary for GURPS, usable in many different settings and genres. It contains over 200 creatures, organized by habitat. If a creature is found in more than one habitat, the creature's full information is duplicated in both habitat entries.

In addition to ordinary animals, the book also covers dinosaurs, legendary beasts, otherworldly creatures, and "loathsome crawlers."

The book contains advice for gamemasters on handling animal encounters, hunting and trapping, animals as companions, and how to create new animals.

=== Second edition, 1994 ===
A revised second edition adds a system for creating and managing were-creatures.

=== Third edition, 2000 ===
The third edition removes the information about were-creatures and the chapter on poisons. These are replaced by a chapter on creating animal player characters. It also added than thirty animals to the bestiary section.

== Publication history ==
Steve Jackson Games (SJG) first published the GURPS role-playing game system in 1986, and many supplements and source books for it were published, including GURPS Bestiary in 1988, a 112-page softcover book written by Steffan O'Sullivan, with cover art by Ken Kelly and interior art by Dan Carroll.

The second edition was released in 1994, and was a 128-page softcover book written by Chris McCubbin and Bob Schroeck and used the original cover art by Kelly. Interior art was created by Donna Barr, Daniel Carroll, Laura Eisenhour, C. Bradford Gorby, Topper Helmers, Douglas Shuler, Dan Smith, and Ruth Thompson. McCubbin and Schroeck later wrote an article in a 1993 issue of SJG's house magazine Pyramid that included extra material for the book.

The third edition was released in 2000, and used the original cover art by Kelly. The 128-page softcover book was written J. Hunter Johnson, who also published extra material for the third edition in a 2000 issue of Pyramid.

== Reception ==
In Issue 42 of Abyss, Dave Nalle noted "A bestiary of some sort is a necessary element of any complete game system,. and with over 200 creatures described, this one does a fairly good job." However, Nalle pointed out that some mythical creatures were described incorrectly, and also found there were a number of omissions. For example, Nalle commented that the fantasy section "includes no elementals, daevas, djinni or demons, making it rather weak for many fantasy backgrounds." Nalle concluded, "On the whole, the GURPS Bestiary is an essential ingrediant of the system as a whole, something that GameMasters can live without, but will certainly find plenty of use for."

In Issue 140 of Dragon (December 1988), Jim Bambra commented, "The art is fairly poor — about the same standard as that in the Monster Manual — so don't expect to be thrilled by the illustrations. The GURPS Bestiary has much to offer GURPS GMs, but it is of limited use to anyone looking for new critters to add to his favorite game system."

In Issue 27 of the French games magazine Backstab, Croc commented, "And here we fall into pure, unadulterated GURPS territory: something where you think, 'I don't know if I'll ever use this, but I'm glad it's included.'" Croc concluded, "It's ludicrous, pointless, and therefore crucial to take a look at it as soon as possible. That said, players using animals (wizard familiars, etc.) will find plenty to work with."

In Issue 9 of the games magazine Gateways, Ian Harac commented, "it serves its purpose very nicely; there are a lot of animals here, with all the necessary GURPS statistics, and a few illustrations." However, Harac pointed out, "On the negative side, there is very little here that is original. All the creatures, as far as I can tell, are drawn from reality, legend, or role-playing tradition." Despite this, Harac concluded, "If you play GURPS, it is almost certainly essential. If you do not play GURPS, the Bestiary might be worth it simply for the idea value of some of its' more exotic creations ... it is a worthwhile collection of beasts and rules; not spectacular or revolutionary, but useful and well produced."

== See also ==
- List of GURPS publications
