= Anthony J. Bryant =

American writer (1961–2013)

- Born: February 14, 1961; Franklin, Indiana, US
- Died: December 25, 2013 (aged 52); Franklin, Indiana, US
- Resting place: Greenlawn Cemetery (Franklin, Indiana)
- Occupation: Author

Anthony J. Bryant (February 14, 1961 – December 25, 2013) was an American author and editor. He worked in Japan for a period of time, and became an authority on medieval Japanese armor and samurai culture.

== Early life ==
Bryant was born in Franklin, Indiana, and he was adopted at age 5 by Robert M. and Margaret Bryant. Following the death of his father when Bryant was 6, he and his mother moved to Miami Shores, Florida, where he spent his youth and attended Pinecrest Preparatory School. After graduating from Florida State University in 1983 with a bachelor's degree in Japanese studies, he completed his graduate studies in Japanese studies (history, language, and armor) at Takushoku University in Tokyo, graduating in 1986. Bryant lived in Japan from 1986 to 1992. He also earned an M.A. in Japanese from Indiana University Bloomington in 2003.

== Career ==
While living in Japan, Bryant worked as a features editor for the Mainichi Daily News, and as editor for the Tokyo Journal, an English language monthly magazine. He was considered a historian of Japan specializing in Kamakura, Muromachi, and Momoyama period warrior culture.

After returning from Japan in 1995, he became the editor of Dragon, the flagship publication of TSR, the creators of the fantasy role-playing game Dungeons & Dragons, for eight issues.

For several years, Bryant made presentations and appeared on panels at several conventions, including the 52nd World Science Fiction Convention in Winnipeg in 1994, and the 54th World Science Fiction Convention in Anaheim in 1996.

As an authority on Japanese armor, Bryant became widely involved in the Society for Creative Anachronism. He provided a foreword for The Watanabe Art Museum Samurai Armour Collection Volume 1: Kabuto & Mengu.

Bryant wrote four books for Osprey Publishing on samurai history, and co-authored, with Mark T. Arsenault, the core rulebook for the role-playing game Sengoku: Chanbara Roleplaying in Feudal Japan.

== Reception ==
In his book The Shogun's Soldiers, Michael von Essen highly recommended Bryant's Samurai 1550–1600 as an "easily accessible book on samurai and ashigaru at the time of [Japanese] civil wars."

In Anime Sacramento, Laurine White responded to an article about Japanimation by Bryant that had been published in EYE-AI magazine, saying, "Some of what [Bryant] has to say is suspect, like 'Few who see Dr. Slump fail to love it.' If that were true, subtitled Dr. Slump should be in great demand. Sure it is!"

== Death ==
Bryant died on December 25, 2013, at St. Francis Health in Indianapolis.

== Books ==
- The Samurai, (Elite), Osprey Publishing, London (1989) ISBN 0-850-45897-8 OCLC 20221896
- Early Samurai AD 200–1500, Osprey Publishing, London (1991) ISBN 1-855-32131-9 OCLC 24696248
- Samurai 1550–1600, Osprey Publishing, London (1994) ISBN 1-855-32345-1 OCLC 31011021
- Sekigahara 1600: The Final Struggle for Power, Osprey Publishing, London (1995) ISBN 1-855-32395-8 OCLC 33355511
- Sengoku: Chanbara Roleplaying in Feudal Japan, Gold Rush Games; Revised edition (May 1, 2002)
- Iwaya no sōshi ("The Tale of the Cave House"): A Translation and Commentary, Indiana University (2003)
- Sekigahara 1600: The Final Struggle for Power, Praeger Publishers (September 2005) ISBN 0-275-98869-4

== Other works ==
- Nihon Katchu Seisakuben , a Japanese armor manual
- The Estates of Heian Nobility (essay)
