= Land of the Rising Sun (role-playing game) =

Feudal Japanese role-playing game

Cover art by Ken Pick

Land of the Rising Sun is a fantasy role-playing game, designed by Lee Gold and published by Fantasy Games Unlimited (FGU) in 1980 that is set in feudal Japan.

== Description ==
In Land of the Rising Sun, players take on the roles of samurai warriors. The game, derived in large part from FGU's previously published fantasy role-playing game Chivalry & Sorcery, is a class-and-level system with rules covering honor, martial arts, aerial and water combat, the astral plane, spirits, demons, and ninjas.

== Publication history ==
In 1977, FGU published the complex fantasy role-playing game Chivalry & Sorcery, noted for both its realism and unwieldy rules. (Game critic Eric Goldberg bemoaned the complexity, saying, "The worst problem arises when the game is actually played — it can move as awkwardly as an octopus on dry land.")

Three years later, FGU set out to create much the same game, but set in feudal Japan. Land of the Rising Sun was released as a boxed set with cover art by Ken Pick, and included a 152-page book and five cardstock reference sheets.

== Reception ==
Forrest Johnson reviewed Land of the Rising Sun in The Space Gamer No. 36. Johnson commented that "LOTRS is a beautiful treasure in an unopenable package. Recommended to zealots, and as a source-book to D&D."

Eric Goldberg reviewed Land of the Rising Sun in Ares Magazine #7 and commented that "Land of the Rising Sun is an estimable addition to a FRP aficionado's library. Aside from being well-explained, it is necessary for those who want to fully understand C&S. The care with which Japanese myth has been reproduced is simply amazing."

Wes Ives reviewed Land of the Rising Sun for Different Worlds magazine and stated that "In summary, I strongly recommend Land of the Rising Sun to the role-players in the readership. It is a complete, entertaining game."

In his 1990 book The Complete Guide to Role-Playing Games, game critic Rick Swan called this game "a thoughtful treatment of medieval Japan, skillfully interweaving imaginative fantasy elements with a scholar's understanding of history." However, Swan found "the background material is much better than the turgid game mechanics it supports ... The character creation system is time-consuming and difficult ... combat encounters seem to drag on forever." Swan concluded by giving the game a rating of 2.5 out of 4 and recommending the game as a sourcebook for other fantasy role-playing games, saying "Land of the Rising Sun demands so much from the players that it's more work than fun. However, as a source of ideas, Land of the Rising Sun is worth investigating by any referee interested in an authentic eastern setting."

In his 1991 book Heroic Worlds, Lawrence Schick called the game "Difficult to play, but the sections describing the society, culture, and legendry of medieval Japan are quite detailed."
