= Sengoku (role-playing game) =

Tabletop role-playing game

Sengoku: Chanbara Roleplaying in Feudal Japan is a role-playing game set in 16th-century Japan.

== Contents ==
Sengoku comes as a single book. It uses the Fuzion rules system, which is highly rated for flexibility but can be difficult to learn. There are detailed descriptions of society, weapons, language, locations and such, a comprehensive filmography, and quotations scattered throughout the book. The tone can be realistic, heroic as in Akira Kurosawa films, or super heroic as in many manga comic books.

== Publication history ==
Sengoku was created by Anthony J. Bryant and Mark Arsenault, and published by Gold Rush Games in 1999.

A revised edition of Sengoku was published in 2002.

== Reception ==
The original version was reviewed in Knights of the Dinner Table Magazine #38.

The revised edition was nominated for the 2002 Grog d'Or Awards in the category Best RPG.

== Reviews ==
- Pyramid
- Casus Belli #122

== See also ==
- Bushido: a role-playing game produced in 1981 by Fantasy Games Unlimited.
- Oriental Adventures: a supplement for the Advanced Dungeons & Dragons role-playing game, produced in 1985 by Gary Gygax's TSR, Inc. and later rereleased in 2001 by Wizards of the Coast.
- Legend of the Five Rings: a role-playing game and accompanying collectible card game, produced in 1995 by Alderac Entertainment Group.
