= Mercenaries, Spies and Private Eyes =

1983 private eye/espionage role-playing game

Mercenaries, Spies, and Private Eyes
- Designers: Michael A. Stackpole
- Publishers: 1st/3rd edition, Blade (division of Flying Buffalo); 2nd edition, Sleuth Publications
- Publication: 1st edition, April 1983; 2nd edition, 1986; 3rd edition, 2019
- Genres: Detective, Espionage
- Systems: Custom Tunnels and Trolls derivative

Mercenaries, Spies and Private Eyes (MSPE) is a tabletop role-playing game published in 1983 by Blade, a division of Flying Buffalo, Inc that covers modern espionage, mercenary combat, and private investigators.

== Description ==
MSPE uses game mechanics based on Flying Buffalo's fantasy role-playing game Tunnels and Trolls, with the addition of a skill system for characters.

=== Characters ===
MSPE determines character attributes by random roll. Skills are purchased for the character by the player using Skill Points. Skills are available in multiple levels, but skill cost goes up exponentially as the level of the skill increases.

=== Game mechanics ===
The core game mechanic of MSPE is the saving throw. Unlike Dungeons & Dragons' saving throws, those in MSPE are not used solely to escape danger. Instead, the MSPE saving throw is an attribute roll. The Gamemaster determines the difficulty of the saving throw, and the player then rolls two six-sided dice and adds the value of the relevant attribute of his/her character. MSPE saving throws can also be modified by skills, in which case the level of the skill being used is also added.

MSPE uses a "loose" skill coupling, where any skill can potentially be used in combination with any attribute. In contrast, many other role-playing games use a "tight" coupling, where each skill has an associated attribute and is used only with that attribute.

For combat, MSPE uses the same system as Tunnels and Trolls, with expanded rules for missile weapons (due to the importance of guns in the modern era) and additional rules for martial arts.

=== Character advancement ===
Characters in MSPE earn Adventure Points (APs) on the basis of the "risk and daring" taken (decided by the gamemaster), success in combat, how well the characters handled their mission, and saving throws made. Gamemasters also have discretion to give out bonus APs. Earning enough APs causes the character to increase in level, and each level gives the character points to add to attributes (which can indirectly give more skill points).

In addition to overall APs, MSPE characters also earn Skill APs by using their skills. When enough skill APs are earned, the skill in question advances a level, regardless of the character's overall APs and level.

== Publication history ==
MSPE was designed and written by Michael A. Stackpole and first published in April 1983 by Blade, a division of Flying Buffalo. A few adventure modules were also released.

Three years later, Sleuth Publications published a second edition; however, Flying Buffalo continued to distribute the game. In 2019 a new revised Combined Edition of MSPE was published by Flying Buffalo that brought together the different material from the previous editions and included additional new rules and expansions.

== Reception ==
In Issue 27 of Abyss, Eric Olson was not impressed, writing, "When compared to other role-playing systems which cover the same material, it pales." Olson called the game system "loose", saying, "There are too many 'gray areas' and gaps that make play run less smoothly," and also noted, "Too many of the encounters and actions are random, with dice rolls ruling the game."

In the January–February 1984 edition of Space Gamer (Issue No. 67), W.G. Armintrout compared Mercenaries, Spies and Private Eyes to Top Secret and Espionage! and concluded, "Mercenaries, Spies & Private Eyes is one of the best-presented role-playing games I've ever seen, and if it isn't seriously in contention for a Charlie at Origins I'll be surprised. It should be understood that the game is supposed to be 'fun'. This means it often plays like: 'Make a saving roll to avoid the giant anaconda' or 'Make a saving roll to dodge the charging tiger'; on the other hand, getting involved in even a minor gunfight is a good way to get killed. MSPE is the simplest game of this bunch, yet I find it intriguing. It seems more open-ended than the other games: Utilizing MSPE rules, you could play out such varied adventurers as Murder on the Orient Express, The Dogs of War, or the exploits of James Bond. The rules are excellent, promise to be well-supported, and can be a great deal of fun if you don't take your gunfights too seriously."

In the January 1984 edition of White Dwarf (Issue #49), John Sutherland found the rules to be badly organized, and attempted to cover too much, with the result that little of substance was revealed. Sutherland gave the system an overall rating of only 4 out of 10, saying, "These rules try to offer too much and end up providing very little. The game concept is good, but the execution is poor... The immense area of diversity that should be available from Agatha Christie to James Bond, is absent. By casting the net too wide, the author captures nothing."

Nick Davison reviewed Mercenaries, Spies & Private Eyes for the British games magazine Imagine, and stated that "MS&PE is an unsuccessful attempt to graft too many ideas together. Although it is certainly cheaper than other comparable RPGs ... no introductory scenario is included with the book."

William A. Barton reviewed Mercenaries, Spies & Private Eyes for Different Worlds magazine and stated that "If you have any interest at all in the modern role-playing of mercs, spies, detectives, or soldiers of fortune, I highly recommend you invest in a copy of Mercenaries, Spies & Private Eyes. Go ahead-make your day!"

In the November 1984 issue of Dragon (Issue 91), Ken Rolston criticized the lack of background material, saying, "There is little help on specific institutions like the CIA and FBI. Economics is glossed over (a practical decision, given the time period addressed), and in general there is insufficient support for campaign-level role-playing." However, Rolston liked the "pleasant, light and practical" writing style, and found two of the chapters in the rulebook, "The Art of Detection" and "Using Live Clues", especially useful, calling them "necessary reading for mystery FRP gamemasters." In conclusion, Rolston noted the lack of supporting adventures and other published material for the system. "There are few supplements available. If you purchase the game, expect to design most of the adventures yourself."

In the February 1985 edition of Dragon (Issue 94), Arlen Walker was impressed that character background was an important part of the character creation process: "The background a player invents for his character is important in setting up the character, and MS&PE is one of the few games that acknowledges this." He also liked the combat system, with its emphasis on weapons other than firearms. "This might be considered a handicap if what you’re trying to do is role-play the A-Team, but it serves as a definite advantage if you’re trying to get your players to do something besides shoot anything that moves (and many things that don’t)." Walker concluded with an unequivocal recommendation: "If you’re planning on role-playing in the modern era, whether you’re interested in James Bond or George Smiley — or even Nero Wolfe —this would be an excellent system to choose. If you’re after a system which allows a great deal of freedom of action, both for referee and player, this is by far the best."

In his 1990 book The Complete Guide to Role-Playing Games, game critic Rick Swan called it "a beautiful game and a remarkable design ... with rules that are simple enough for novices yet sophisticated enough to satisfy the most experienced gamers." The one issue Swan had with this game was its simplicity. "Because the game stresses simplicity, detail is necessarily understated, perhaps too much for players who insist on precision." Nonetheless, Swan gave this game an excellent rating of 3.5 out of 4, saying, it's a lot of fun, and easily one of the most ingenious private eye/secret agent RPGs ever published."

In 1999, Pyramid magazine named Mercenaries, Spies and Private Eyes as one of The Millennium's Most Underrated Games. Editor Scott Haring described the game as "one of those 'I can't figure out why it wasn't more popular' kind of games, though publisher Flying Buffalo has had enough of those ... to make me think there may be a connection."

== See also ==
- MSPE Character Folder (1984)
- Ident-A-Kit Set 1: Fingerprints (1987)
