= Lee Gold =

American writer and game designer

- Occupations: Writer, editor
- Known for: Alarums and Excursions
- Spouse: Barry Gold

Lee Gold is a member of California science fiction fandom and a writer and editor in the role-playing game and filk music communities.

== Role-playing games ==
Gold became prominent after 1975 as the editor of Alarums and Excursions, a monthly amateur press association to which RPG writers have contributed over the years. It won the Charles S. Roberts Award for Best Amateur Wargame Magazine in 1984, and the Origins Award for Best Amateur Game Periodical in 2000, 2001, and 2002. Gold began the publication at the request of Bruce Pelz, who felt that discussion of Dungeons & Dragons was taking up too much space in APA-L, an amateur press association loosely associated with the Los Angeles Science Fantasy Society.

Gold was listed in the 'Top 50 Most Influential People in the Adventure Game Market for Y2000'

In May 2025 the game company Chaosium reported that Gold had stopped publishing Alarums and Excursions "just shy of its 50th anniversary, and [after] over 590 monthly issues."

== Professional works ==
Her professional credits in the RPG field include Land of the Rising Sun and Lands of Adventure, published by Fantasy Games Unlimited; GURPS Japan, published by Steve Jackson Games; and Vikings, published by Iron Crown Enterprises. Land of the Rising Sun (1980) was a Japanese-themed role-playing game using the Chivalry & Sorcery game system, and Lands of Adventure (1983) was a game system meant for both historical fantasy and Science Fiction-based role-playing games.

Gold's novel Valhalla: Absent Without Leave was published March 30, 2021 by Penmore Press. Gold wrote, "But the book isn't about the ancient Norse or the Vikings. It's about a modern hero who arrived at Valhalla with her D&D magic sword, Frostbite. Robin Grima isn't content to train in Valhalla to fight and die in Ragnarok. She wants to stop Ragnarok from happening! She doesn't care about the prophecies. She wants to win!". Valhalla: Into The Darkness, the second novel in her trilogy, was published in early 2022. Valhalla: Into Brightness was published in July of 2024.

Land of the Rising Sun #2 was named Best Roleplaying Expansion (People's Choice) by UK Games Expo 2021.

== Filk ==
In 1988, Gold (who had been filking since 1967) also began publishing Xenofilkia, a bimonthly collection of filk lyrics (and some sheet music). Over 400 songwriters have contributed, including Leslie Fish, Tom Smith and Bob Kanefsky. Although Gold has published filk lyrics, she has never recorded for public distribution.

Lee and Barry Gold were jointly inducted into the Filk Hall of Fame in 1997. They were Interfilk guests at Ohio Valley Filk Fest in 2000. and Featured Filkers at Boskone 44 in 2007.

== Publishing history ==
Lee Gold published the fan fiction fanzine "The Third Foundation" from 1967 until at least 1969.

As of April 30, 2025, she had published 593 issues of Alarums and Excursions and 220 issues of Xenofilkia, as well as six volumes of Filker Up!, an anthology of filk-songs mostly by Lee but including songs by other writers that Lee considered worthy of inclusion.

She published Tom Digby: Along Fantasy Way, a collection of writings by Tom Digby, for ConFrancisco, the 1993 Worldcon where Digby was an Honored Guest, and has published writings by other prominent fan writers in the Los Angeles area.

She has also published a collection of songs by Dr. Jane Robinson (2012-9-10), and another of songs by Cynthia McQuillin (2014-3-8). In both cases, James Robinson sent copies of all the songs in his possession to Gold. Kristoph Klover and Margaret Davis (McQuillin's literary executors) lent McQuillin's handwritten songs to Robinson, who copied them and sent them to Gold for inclusion. Many other people helped make the McQuillin songbook as complete as possible: the subhead for the songbook reads "all the songs written by Cynthia McQuillin that Dr. James Robinson and Lee Gold and Mary Creasey and Harold Stein and Bob Kanefsky and Alan Thiesen and Margaret Davis and Kristoph Klover could find in 2013."

Lee ceased publication of both A&E and Xenofilkia in March 2025.
