= Steffan O'Sullivan =

Role-playing game designer

Steffan O'Sullivan is the author of several role-playing game books. Among his works are the GURPS system books GURPS Bestiary, GURPS Bunnies & Burrows, and GURPS Swashbucklers. He is also the collaborative author of the Fudge open gaming system and the Sherpa game.

== Career ==
Steffan O'Sullivan was a writer for GURPS products including GURPS Swashbucklers (1990) and GURPS Bunnies & Burrows (1992). He designed the FUDGE role-playing game system, first releasing it for free on the internet on December 7, 1993. His friend Ann Dupuis wanted to start her own game company, using FUDGE as its flagship game; O'Sullivan agreed, as long as she allowed the game to remain available for free on the internet, so Dupuis formed Wild Mule Games and published FUDGE in a limited print run in 1994. Dupuis changed the company's name to Grey Ghost Press in 1995, and convinced O'Sullivan to work up a new FUDGE ruleset, published on the internet in June 1995, and released later that year as the first large-scale FUDGE release from Grey Ghost Press. O'Sullivan changed the name from FUDGE to Fudge in 2000, and transferred the rights to the game to Grey Ghost Press officially in March 2004. O'Sullivan wrote the Princess Bride role-playing game using the FUDGE system, which was published by Toy Vault in 2019.

As of 2024, he lives in New Hampshire.
