= Robert N. Charrette =

American writer, artist and game designer

- Occupations: Artist; game designer; sculptor

Robert N. Charrette (born 1953) is an American graphic artist, game designer, sculptor and author. Charrette has authored more than a dozen novels. His gaming materials have received many Origins Awards. Charrette was inducted in the Origins Hall of Fame in 2003. His work is known for a clean, realistic style that invokes themes from Feudal Japan and Chanbara films and in particular, historical and fantastic representations of Samurai culture. His early work in game design and miniature sculpting set the tone for depictions of Japanese mythology in American fantasy and science fiction. His 1979 role-playing game Bushido was one of the first role-playing games with a non-Western theme and remained in print for more than three decades. Charrette produced gaming products for Fantasy Games Unlimited, Grenadier Models Inc., Ral Partha Enterprises, FASA and currently operates Parroom Enterprises, LLC, a boutique miniatures game company.

== Early life ==
Charrette grew up in Rhode Island. He earned an interdisciplinary degree in biology and geology at Brown University. He is a lifelong fan of dinosaurs and participates in the La Belle Compagnie, a non-profit dedicated to educating the public about daily life during the Hundred Years War.

== Career ==
Charrette began his career in 1976 as an illustrator for Little Soldier Games. He continued on at the company's successor, Tyr Games, which became Phoenix Games and then Fantasy Games Unlimited in 1980.

Charrette added game design and sculpting to his repertoire. With Paul R. Hume, he co-wrote and illustrated Bushido (1979), Aftermath! (1981) and Daredevils (1982). Charrette co-wrote Spacefarers with Ed Lipsett. By 1979, Charrette had created 25 mm miniatures to accompany Bushido and Fantasy Games Unlimited's Gangster! and Space Opera game worlds. Those initial Japanese-themed figures began a series that he would revise many times. He produced similar Samurai-themed lines for Grenadier Models Inc., Ral Partha Enterprises, Reaper Miniatures and others.

Charrette became a prolific sculptor. He joined Ral Partha in 1984 and contributed to Tom Meier's The Hoplites, 1200 A.D. and CS/02-xxx Collector Series lines. In 1985, Charrette inaugurated figures for Chaosium's RuneQuest and a line of pulp era adventurers that were initially called "20th Century Plus", but were later renamed 20-xxx The Roaring Twenties. They were an update of the line of figures he sculpted in 1979 to accompany Fantasy Games Unlimited's Gangster!. and included cinematic themes such as the intrepid archaeologist.

He was part of a team of sculptors that produced a line of miniature robot war machines for Ral Partha in 1985. The miniatures were for a game that was first called "Battledroids" and renamed BattleTech in 1986, for FASA's game of the same name. It was the beginning of a permanent relationship between the two companies that would eventually lead to Ral Partha's sale to FASA. Charrette began a long-term relationship with FASA as a sculptor, game designer and novelist.

In 1986, Charrette introduced Ral Partha's 53-9xx Bushido, an expansion of his earlier line. Bushido coincided with TSR, Inc.'s 1985 release of Oriental Adventures supplements, a gaming world that resembled the one crafted by Charrette and Hume in 1979.

At the time integrated campaign worlds such as Games Workshop's Warhammer Fantasy Battle were showing early success, Ral Partha introduced the "Chaos Wars" theme into their 1986 and 1987 product lines. It was the first step toward unifying a collection of disparate product lines into an integrated game world. Charrette added a fantasy component to Ral Partha's existing Rules According to Ral for medieval battles. It was released in 1987 as part of a boxed set Rules According to Ral: Chaos Wars. Chaos Wars unified existing product lines and their packaging was marked with stickers. Among these sets were Charrette's popular Fangs of Fury Beastmen. Still Nascent, the Chaos Wars theme, was dropped in 1988 to promote a new contract for a line of official miniatures for TSR, Inc.'s Advanced Dungeons & Dragons game.

As Ral Partha became engaged with TSR, Charrette solidified his relationship with FASA. In 1988, he joined his longtime partner Paul R. Hume and others to construct FASA's 1989 Shadowrun game world. Charrette provided design elements and artwork for Shadowrun and sculpted a line of figures produced by Grenadier Models Inc. While at Grenadier, Charrette also crafted a line of miniatures for Star Wars: The Roleplaying Game (by West End Games), Lost Lands range of dinosaurs and 15 mm Warlord ranges. As the creative focus of Grenadier Models Inc. moved to the United Kingdom in 1991 and 1992, FASA moved its production of Shadowrun figures to Ral Partha.

Charrette had quickly become an integral member of FASA's creative team. In 1989, he expanded his design concepts for FASA games into supporting novelizations. Over the next six years, Charrette produced nine novels for FASA's Shadowrun, Battletech and Mechwarrior game worlds. As FASA's attention turned to video games, Charrette wrote Strange World of John Reddy Trilogy (1994–1995) for Warner Books, Chronicle of Aelwyn Trilogy (1996–1997) for HarperCollins and two Interstellar Defense League (1999, 2004) novels for Eos and under the pseudonym "Richard Fawkes."

In 2001, Charrette returned to game design and began Parroom Enterprises, LLC. and miniature and games company which offers miniatures, games and supplements with fantasy themes inspired by the Victorian and medieval Japanese periods.

== Bibliography ==
=== Roleplaying Games and Supplements ===
- Knights of the Round Table (illustrator, with Phil Edgren, The Little Soldier, 1976)

Bushido

- Bushido: Role Playing Adventure in Feudal Japan (with Paul R. Hume, Tyr Games 1979, Phoenix Games 1980, Fantasy Games Unlimited 1981)
- Bushido Book 1: The Heroes of Nippon (Phoenix Games 1980, Fantasy Games Unlimited 1981)
- Bushido Book 2: The Land of Nippon (Phoenix Games 1980, Fantasy Games Unlimited 1981)
- Bushido Adventure Pack: Valley of Mists (Fantasy Games Unlimited 1982)
- Bushido Gamesmaster's Screen (Fantasy Games Unlimited, 1980)

Aftermath!

- Aftermath! (with Paul R. Hume, Fantasy Games Unlimited 1981)
- Aftermath! Book 2, Survivors of the Aftermath, a Player's Guide for a Post-holocaust World (with Paul R. Hume, Fantasy Games Unlimited 1981).
- Aftermath! Book 3 the World of the Aftermath, a Gamemaster's Guide for a Post-holocaust World (with Paul R. Hume, Fantasy Games Unlimited 1981).
- Aftermath Scenario Pack 1 Into the Ruins the City of Littleton (with Paul R. Hume, Fantasy Games Unlimited, January 1981).

Spacefarers

- Spacefarers Guide to Alien Races (with Ed Lipsett, Phoenix Games 1979)
- Spacefarers Guide to Sector One (with Ed Lipsett, Phoenix Games 1979)
- Spacefarers Guide to Sector Two: Rourke's Diadem (with Ed Lipsett, Phoenix Games 1979)

Daredevils

- Daredevils: Role Playing Action and Adventure in the Two-Fisted Thirties (with Paul R. Hume, Fantasy Games Unlimited Inc. 1982)
- Daredevil Adventures featuring Deadly Coins and other stories (with J. Andrew Keith and Stefan Jones, June 1983)

The Mines of Keridav

- Demon Pits of Caeldo (with Kerry Lloyd, Larry Shade and V.M. Wyman, Gamelords 1983)

Rules According to Ral

- Chaos Wars: Rules According to Ral (Ral Partha Enterprises, 1985)

Runequest

- Runequest: Land of Ninja (Avalon Hill, 1986).

Shadowrun World

- Shadowrun - Where Man Meets Magic And Machine (with Paul R. Hume and Tom Dowd, FASA, 1989)

Earthdawn

- Denizens of Earthdawn (FASA 1994)

Parroom Station

- Skyrunners: Martian Aerial Race System
- Valor & Steel & Flesh

=== Novels ===
BattleTech Series—FASA, ROC

- Heir to the Dragon (Battletech #1, August 1989, ISBN 978-1555600952)
- Wolfpack (Battletech #4, 1989, ISBN 978-0451451507)
- Wolves on the Border (Battletech #25, March 1989, Reprint 1992 ISBN 978-1555600877)

MechWarrior Series—ROC

- Initiation to War (MechWarrior #4, December 2001, ISBN 978-0451458513)

Shadowrun Series—ROC, Fanpro

- Never Deal with a Dragon (Shadowrun #1, December 1990, ISBN 978-0451450784
- Choose Your Enemies Carefully (Shadowrun #2, January 1991, ISBN 978-0451451255)
- Find Your Own Truth (Shadowrun #3, June 1991, ISBN 978-0451450821)
- Never Trust an Elf (Shadowrun #6, June 1992, ISBN 978-0451452207)
- Just Compensation (Shadowrun #19, November 1995, ISBN 978-0451453723)

Strange World of John Reddy Trilogy—Warner Books

- A Prince Among Men (Book #1, September 1994, ISBN 978-0446600378)
- A King Beneath the Mountain (Book #2, April 1995, ISBN 978-0446600385)
- A Knight Among Knaves (Book #3, December 1995, ISBN 978-0446600392)

Chronicle of Aelwyn Trilogy—HarperCollins

- Timespell (Book #1, March 1996, ISBN 978-0061054983)
- Eye of the Serpent (Book #2, September 1996, ISBN 978-0061054990)
- Wizard of Bones (Book #3, April 1997, ISBN 978-0061056031)

Interstellar Defense League (as Richard Fawkes) -- Eos

- Face of the Enemy (1999)
- Nature of the Beast (2004)

Non-Fiction

- Fiore dei Liberi's Armizare, the Chivalric Martial Arts System of Il Fiore di Battaglia—Freelance Press (Sept. 2011, ISBN 978-0-9825911-7-8)

=== Sculpting ===
- Adina Corporation, C-Series (1978)
- Broadsword (1979)
- Fantasy Games Unlimited, Gangsters! miniature series (FGU G01-04 - 1979)
- Fantasy Games Unlimited Bushido miniature series (FGU N01-08, 1979)
- Fantasy Games Unlimited Space Opera Starships and Spacemen (FGU 1050, 1979)
- Ral Partha Enterprises Macedonians in Tom Meier's The Hoplites, 1200 A.D. series (1984)
- Ral Partha Enterprises Fantasy Collector CS/02-xxx Collector Series (with Tom Meier, 1984)
- Ral Partha Enterprises 25mm Samurai (1985)
- Ral Partha Enterprises 20th Century Plus, 20-xxx The Roaring Twenties (1985)
- Ral Partha Enterprises Runequest (with Julie Guthrie, 1985)
- Ral Partha Enterprises Bushido series (1986)
- Ral Partha Enterprises Battletech series (1986–1989)
- Ral Partha Enterprises Mechwarriors series (1986)
- Grenadier Models Inc., Star Wars series (with Julie Guthrie, 1988)
- Grenadier Models Inc., Lost Lands series
- Grenadier Models Inc., Shadowrun series
- Grenadier Models Inc., 15mm Warlords series
- Lance and Laser, Villains and Vigilantes (V&V10-27, with Sandra Garrity, 2009 acquired by Team Frog Studios)
- Parroom Station, LLC., Of Mars and Martians
- Parroom Station, LLC., Victorian Science Fiction
- Parroom Station, LLC., Victoriana
- Parroom Station, LLC., Heroes of Nippon (includes Ral Partha Bushido line)
- Parroom Station, LLC., Secret Science
- Jeff Valiant Studios, Tyrannosaur
- Em-4, Oriental Blades box set.
- Texas Miniatures Bushido
- Reaper, Daimyo Range (includes most of the Texas Miniatures range)
- Dark Horse Designs, Robotech
- Dark Horse Designs, Bill Willingham's Elementals
- Highlander Studio, Sculptor's Choice
- Alderac Entertainment Group (AEG), Clan Wars series
- Alderac Entertainment Group (AEG), 7th Seas series
- Battle Honors, WWII Germans and Americans
- Lance and Laser, Villains and Vigilantes, (with Sandra Garrity) renamed Living Legends in 1991. Sold by Team Frog Industries in 2009.
- Gallo Pewter

== Awards ==
Origins Awards / H.G. Wells Awards

- 1985 – Best Historical Figure Series – 25mm Samurai (53-7xx Bob Charrette, Dennis Mize)
- 1986 – Best Vehicular or Accessory Series – BattleTech Mech. (20-8xx Bob Charrette, Julie Guthrie, Tom Meier)
- 1987 – Best Historical Figure Series – Shogun Hardguys: The New Samurai (53-7xx Dennis Mize, Bob Charrette)
- 1988 – Best Vehicular or Accessory Series – BattleTech Mechs (20-8xx Bob Charrette, Julie Guthrie, Tom Meier)
- 1989 – Best Vehicular Miniatures Series – BattleTech Mechs and Vehicles (20-xxx Dave Summers, Sandy Garrity, Richard Kerr, Tom Meier, Bob Charrette, Julie Guthrie)
- 1991 – Best Vehicular Miniatures Series – BattleTech Mechs & Vehicles (20-xxx Jeff Wilhelm, Dave Summers, Sandy Garrity, Richard Kerr, Tom Meier, Bob Charrette, Julie Guthrie)
- 1992 – Best Vehicular Miniatures Series – BattleTech Mechs & Vehicles (20-8xx Jeff Wilhelm, Dave Summers, Sandy Garrity, Richard Kerr, Tom Meier, Bob Charrette, Julie Guthrie)

Origins Hall of Fame

- 2003 – Bob Charrette
