= Paul Cockburn =

British role-playing game designer

- Occupation: Game designer

Paul Cockburn is a game designer who has worked primarily on role-playing games.

== Career ==
Paul Cockburn worked for Imagine magazine, published by TSR. Cockburn later led the new editorial team of White Dwarf as its editor, beginning in 1986 with issue #78.
