= Imagine (game magazine) =

British magazine dedicated to Advanced Dungeons & Dragons

- Issue #2, cover art by Les Edwards
- Editor: Keith Thomson
- Frequency: Monthly
- Publisher: Don Turnbull
- First issue: April 1983
- Final issue Number: October 1985; 30 (+1 special issue)
- Company: TSR Hobbies (UK) Ltd
- Country: United Kingdom
- Based in: Cambridge
- ISSN: 0753-8014

Imagine (printed under the long title Imagine: Adventure Game Magazine) was a British monthly magazine dedicated to the first edition Advanced Dungeons & Dragons and Dungeons & Dragons role-playing game systems published by TSR UK Limited.

== History ==
Shannon Appelcine explained, "TSR tried to horn in on the British magazine market in 1983 with Imagine magazine, but they folded it just two years later. Gary Gygax would much later claim that Imagine had usually been operated at a loss and was kept around mainly for its useful marketing of TSR's lines. White Dwarf's lead in Britain was pretty much unassailable."

Imagine was published monthly between April 1983 and October 1985. The print run lasted for 31 issues (30 issues and one special edition) before its cancellation. Don Turnbull was cited as publisher and Paul Cockburn as assistant editor for the majority of the life of the publication.

Neil Gaiman wrote film reviews for several issues of Imagine in the early part of his career, taking over from Colin Greenland, and had his first short story "Featherquest" published here in May 1984. Gaiman's "How to Sell the Ponti Bridge", reprinted for the first time in M is for Magic was also first published in Imagine in March 1985.

== Legacy ==
Some of the official AD&D material originally published in Imagine was collected and used in Unearthed Arcana. Imagine was also responsible for several creative spin-offs, notably the Pelinore gaming world. The magazine also featured the classic adventure game comic The Sword of Alabron in issues 1 to 16. This was briefly revived as a second story arc titled Auchter's Axe in issues 29 to 30 prior to the magazine's cancellation.

When some TSR UK staffers were made redundant, they started the publication Game Master to try to maintain the experience of Imagine and some of its popular features, such as Pelinore; that magazine also published articles containing details on the closure of Imagine, which criticized Gary Gygax and TSR.
