= List of Mage: The Ascension books =

Game books for Mage: The Ascension

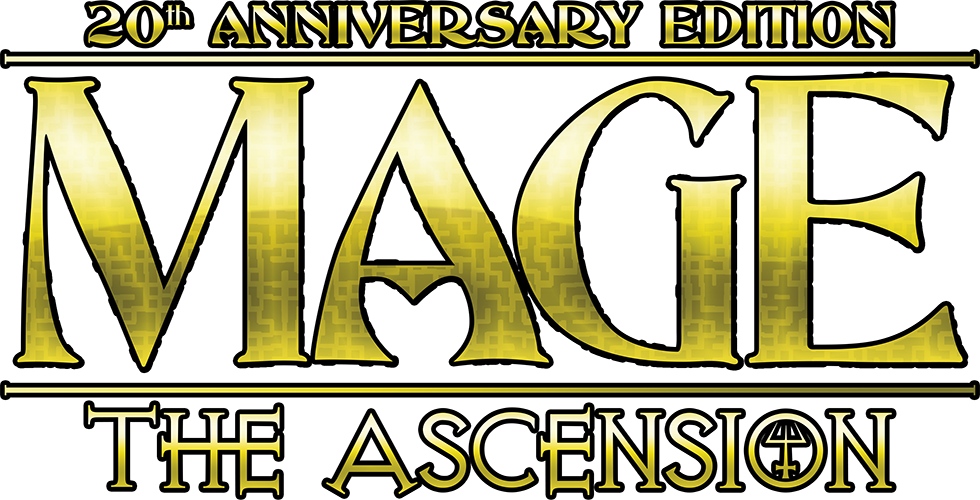
Mage: The Ascension 20th Anniversary Edition logo

Mage: The Ascension is a tabletop role-playing game in the World of Darkness series, where players take the roles of mages. It was originally released by White Wolf Publishing in 1993, and released in new editions in 1995 (second edition), 2000 (Revised Edition), and 2015 (20th Anniversary Edition), which update the game rules. These have been supported with supplementary game books, expanding the game mechanics and setting.

The books from the game's original run in 1993–2004 were published by White Wolf Publishing, sometimes under their imprint Black Dog Game Factory for books considered more adult. Onyx Path Publishing, a company formed by ex–White Wolf Publishing staff, released five further supplements for the Revised Edition in 2012–2013, and are the publisher of the 20th Anniversary Edition books.

The supplements include the Tradition Book and Technocracy series, both covering groups of mages; guides to the game; and various other books. Adventure modules have been released, but only rarely, as White Wolf Publishing has preferred to let storytellers (Note: The person leading the game is called the "storyteller" in World of Darkness games, a role called "gamemaster" or "dungeon master" in other role-playing games.) construct their own adventures, an uncommon choice in tabletop role-playing games that they could afford due to the World of Darkness series' success and longevity. Mage: The Ascension was one of their three highest selling game lines, along with Vampire: The Masquerade and Werewolf: The Apocalypse, and also performed well commercially for Onyx Path Publishing.

== Books ==
=== First edition (1993–1995) ===
Game books for Mage: The Ascension's first edition
Title	Original release	ISBN	Publisher	Notes
Mage: The Ascension	August 19, 1993	1-56504-065-1	White Wolf Publishing	Core rulebook for the game's first edition
The Angel of Mercy	1993	1-56504-081-3	White Wolf Publishing	Adventure module featuring a neo-Nazi antagonist. Bundled with storyteller screen.
The Book of Chantries	January 1994	1-56504-084-8	White Wolf Publishing	Sourcebook for mages' home bases and headquarters
Loom of Fate	February 1994	1-56504-082-1	White Wolf Publishing	Adventure module set in San Francisco. Follow-up to story in the first edition's rulebook.
Digital Web	February–April 1994	1-56504-106-2	White Wolf Publishing	Sourcebook for the Web, a digital realm accessed by mages
Technocracy: Progenitors	March 1994	1-56504-111-9	White Wolf Publishing	Sourcebook for the Technocracy convention the Progenitors
The Book of Shadows	May 1994	1-56504-119-4	White Wolf Publishing	Guide to the game for players
Tradition Book: Virtual Adepts	May 1994	1-56504-114-3	White Wolf Publishing	Sourcebook for the mage tradition the Virtual Adepts
Technocracy: Iteration X	August–October 1994	1-56504-135-6	White Wolf Publishing	Sourcebook for the Technocracy convention Iteration X
Tradition Book: Verbena	October 1994	1-56504-128-3	White Wolf Publishing	Sourcebook for the mage tradition the Verbena
Tradition Book: Sons of Ether	October–December 1994	1-56504-138-0	White Wolf Publishing	Sourcebook for the mage tradition the Sons of Ether
The Book of Madness	December 1994	1-56504-137-2	White Wolf Publishing	Sourcebook for alien forces including the Nephandi, the Marauders, and the Umbrood
Ascension's Right Hand	April 1995	1-56504-430-4	White Wolf Publishing	Sourcebook for partnerships between mages and normal humans
Technocracy: N.W.O.	April 1995	1-56504-423-1	White Wolf Publishing	Sourcebook for the Technocracy convention the New World Order
Halls of the Arcanum	June 1995	1-56504-431-2	White Wolf Publishing	Sourcebook for the secret society Arcanum
Tradition Book: Akashic Brotherhood	June–August 1995	1-56504-410-X	White Wolf Publishing	Sourcebook for the mage tradition the Akashic Brotherhood

=== Second edition (1995–1999) ===
Game books for Mage: The Ascension's second edition
Title	Original release	ISBN	Publisher	Notes
Mage: The Ascension	December 1995	1-56504-400-2	White Wolf Publishing	Core rulebook for the game's second edition
Destiny's Price	December 1995	1-56504-450-9	White Wolf Publishing	Sourcebook for outcasts. Published under the Black Dog Game Factory imprint.
Technocracy: Void Engineers	March 1996	1-56504-424-X	White Wolf Publishing	Sourcebook for the Technocracy convention the Void Engineers
Tradition Book: Celestial Chorus	July 1996	1-56504-411-8	White Wolf Publishing	Sourcebook for the mage tradition the Celestial Chorus
Tradition Book: Cult of Ecstasy	July 1996	1-56504-412-6	White Wolf Publishing	Sourcebook for the mage tradition the Cult of Ecstasy
Horizon: Stronghold of Hope	Mid–July 1996	1-56504-425-8	White Wolf Publishing	Sourcebook for Horizon, the tradition mages' capital
The Book of Crafts	September–October 1996	1-56504-435-5	White Wolf Publishing	Sourcebook for independent groups of mages
Beyond the Barriers: The Book of Worlds	Q4 1996	1-56504-434-7	White Wolf Publishing	Sourcebook for otherworldly realms
Hidden Lore	1996	1-56504-402-9	White Wolf Publishing	Sourcebook for Seattle, covering characters and magic spells. Bundled with storyteller screen.
Tradition Book: Dreamspeakers	January–February 1997	1-56504-413-4	White Wolf Publishing	Sourcebook for the mage tradition the Dreamspeakers
The Book of Mirrors	May–June 1997	1-56504-403-7	White Wolf Publishing	Guide for storytellers
Tradition Book: Euthanatos	June 15, 1997	1-56504-414-2	White Wolf Publishing	Sourcebook for the mage tradition the Euthanatos
Tradition Book: Order of Hermes	July 1997	1-56504-416-9	White Wolf Publishing	Sourcebook for the mage tradition the Order of Hermes
Technocracy: Syndicate	September 1997	1-56504-421-5	White Wolf Publishing	Sourcebook for the Technocracy convention the Syndicate
Technomancer's Toybox	December 1997	1-56504-420-7	White Wolf Publishing	Sourcebook for technomagical devices
Digital Web 2.0	October 1998	1-56504-426-6	White Wolf Publishing	Sourcebook for the Web, a digital realm accessed by mages. Second edition of Digital Web.
The Orphans Survival Guide	October 1998	1-56504-436-3	White Wolf Publishing	Sourcebook for outcasts. Follow-up to Destiny's Price.
The Spirit Ways	August–October 1999	1-56504-453-3	White Wolf Publishing	Sourcebook for shamanism
Guide to the Technocracy	1999	1-56504-417-7	White Wolf Publishing	Sourcebook for the Technocracy and guide to using them in campaigns
Initiates of the Art	1999	1-56504-437-1	White Wolf Publishing	Sourcebook for new mages with weak magical abilities
Masters of the Art	1999	1-56504-427-4	White Wolf Publishing	Sourcebook for archmages with great magical abilities. Follow-up to Initiates of the Art.
Tales of Magick: Dark Adventure	1999	1-56504-404-5	White Wolf Publishing	Guide for storytellers on creating campaigns based on adventure and action

=== Revised Edition (2000–2004 and 2012–2013) ===
Game books for Mage: The Ascension Revised Edition
Title	Original release	ISBN	Publisher	Notes
Mage: The Ascension Revised Edition	March 2000	1-56504-405-3	White Wolf Publishing	Core rulebook for the game's Revised Edition
Storytellers Companion	March 2000	1-56504-406-1	White Wolf Publishing	Sourcebook for the history of the Ascension War, secret societies, spirits, and magical items. Bundled with storyteller screen.
The Bitter Road	March 2000	1-56504-407-X	White Wolf Publishing	Sourcebook for the aftermath of the Ascension War
Dead Magic	June 26, 2000	1-56504-408-8	White Wolf Publishing	Sourcebook for magic of ancient cultures. Published under the Black Dog Game Factory imprint.
Blood Treachery	July 24, 2000	1-56504-409-6	White Wolf Publishing	Sourcebook for the feud between the Order of Hermes and the vampire clan Tremere. Crossover with Vampire: The Masquerade.
Dragons of the East	September 2000	1-56504-428-2	White Wolf Publishing	Sourcebook for mages in East Asia
Sorcerer Revised Edition	October 2000	1-56504-439-8	White Wolf Publishing	Sourcebook for sorcerers. Second edition of World of Darkness: Sorcerer, which was released for the World of Darkness series in general.
Tradition Book: Akashic Brotherhood	January–April 2001	1-56504-456-8	White Wolf Publishing	Sourcebook for the mage tradition the Akashic Brotherhood. Second edition.
Lost Paths: Ahl-i-Batin and Taftâni	January–May 2001	1-56504-429-0	White Wolf Publishing	Sourcebook for mages in the Middle East
Tradition Book: Celestial Chorus	June 2001	1-56504-457-6	White Wolf Publishing	Sourcebook for the mage tradition the Celestial Chorus. Second edition.
The Book of Madness	October 2001	1-56504-442-8	White Wolf Publishing	Sourcebook for alien forces including the Nephandi, the Marauders, and the Umbrood. Second edition.
Tradition Book: Cult of Ecstasy	November 2001	1-56504-449-5	White Wolf Publishing	Sourcebook for the mage tradition the Cult of Ecstasy. Second edition.
Guide to the Traditions	2001	1-56504-455-X	White Wolf Publishing	Sourcebook for the mage traditions as a whole, and their failings
Convention Book: Iteration X	February 2002	1-56504-441-X	White Wolf Publishing	Sourcebook for the Technocracy convention Iteration X. Second edition of Technocracy: Iteration X.
Tradition Book: Dreamspeakers	March 2002	1-58846-400-8	White Wolf Publishing	Sourcebook for the mage tradition the Dreamspeakers. Second edition.
Tradition Book: Euthanatos	April 2002	1-58846-401-6	White Wolf Publishing	Sourcebook for the mage tradition the Euthanatos. Second edition.
Tradition Book: Hollow Ones	July 2002	1-58846-403-2	White Wolf Publishing	Sourcebook for the Hollow Ones, a group of mages loosely associated with the traditions
Mage Storytellers Handbook	2002	1-58846-402-4	White Wolf Publishing	Guide for storytellers on leading games
Manifesto: Transmissions From the Rogue Council	2002	1-58846-407-5	White Wolf Publishing	Sourcebook for the Rogue Council, a group of mages opposing the Technocracy
The Fallen Tower: Las Vegas	February 2003	1-58846-408-3	White Wolf Publishing	Sourcebook for Las Vegas
Dead Magic II: Secrets and Survivors	March 2003	1-58846-406-7	White Wolf Publishing	Sourcebook for ancient magic
The Infinite Tapestry	May 2003	1-58846-409-1	White Wolf Publishing	Sourcebook for otherworldly realms. Follow-up to Beyond the Barriers: The Book of Worlds.
Tradition Book: Order of Hermes	July 2003	1-58846-413-X	White Wolf Publishing	Sourcebook for the mage tradition the Order of Hermes. Second edition.
Forged by Dragon's Fire	August 2003	1-58846-410-5	White Wolf Publishing	Sourcebook for magical items
Tradition Book: Sons of Ether	September 2003	1-58846-414-8	White Wolf Publishing	Sourcebook for the mage tradition the Sons of Ether. Second edition.
The Red Sign	October 2003	1-58846-245-5	White Wolf Publishing	Sourcebook for campaigns involving mages and vampires. Crossover with Vampire: The Masquerade. Part of the Time of Judgment series.
Tradition Book: Verbena	November 2003	1-58846-415-6	White Wolf Publishing	Sourcebook for the mage tradition the Verbena. Second edition.
Tradition Book: Virtual Adepts	December 2003	1-58846-416-4	White Wolf Publishing	Sourcebook for the mage tradition the Virtual Adepts. Second edition.
Ascension	March 2004	1-58846-417-2	White Wolf Publishing	Collection of adventures about ascension. Part of the Time of Judgment series, and an ending to Mage: The Ascension.
Convention Book: N.W.O.	November 27, 2012	—N/a	Onyx Path Publishing	Sourcebook for the Technocracy convention the New World Order. Second edition of Technocracy: N.W.O.
Convention Book: Progenitors	April 22, 2013	—N/a	Onyx Path Publishing	Sourcebook for the Technocracy convention the Progenitors. Second edition of Technocracy: Progenitors.
Mage Translation Guide	May 27, 2013	—N/a	Onyx Path Publishing	Guide for porting elements between Mage: The Ascension and Mage: The Awakening
Convention Book: Syndicate	July 31, 2013	—N/a	Onyx Path Publishing	Sourcebook for the Technocracy convention the Syndicate. Second edition of Technocracy: Syndicate.
Convention Book: Void Engineers	October 18, 2013	—N/a	Onyx Path Publishing	Sourcebook for the technocracy convention the Void Engineers. Second edition of Technocracy: Void Engineers.

=== 20th Anniversary Edition (2014–present) ===
Game books for Mage: The Ascension 20th Anniversary Edition
Title	Original release	ISBN	Publisher	Notes
Mage: The Ascension 20th Anniversary Edition Quickstart	June 21, 2014	—N/a	Onyx Path Publishing	Introduction to the game, with story hooks, brief rules, and pre-made characters. Released for free.
Mage: The Ascension 20th Anniversary Edition	September 23, 2015	—N/a	Onyx Path Publishing	Core rulebook for the game's 20th Anniversary Edition
How Do You Do That?	December 30, 2015	—N/a	Onyx Path Publishing	Guide to the game's magic system, with example spells
The Book of Secrets	July 26, 2017	—N/a	Onyx Path Publishing	Companion to the core rulebook
Gods & Monsters	April 10, 2019	—N/a	Onyx Path Publishing	Sourcebook for supernatural beings and normal humans
The Book of the Fallen	January 15, 2020	—N/a	Onyx Path Publishing	Sourcebook for the Nephandi
Le Prix à Payer	December 2020	978-2-37255-047-5	Arkhane Asylum Publishing	Guide for storytellers on leading games, by the game's French publisher. Includes story hooks, characters, and adventures. Bundled with storyteller screen. Title translates to "The Price to Pay".
XV: Rouen Brûle-t-Elle ?	June 2021	978-2-37255-048-2	Arkhane Asylum Publishing	Sourcebook for Rouen, by the game's French publisher. Title translates to "XV: Is Rouen Burning?"
Technocracy Reloaded	July 21, 2021	—N/a	Onyx Path Publishing	Sourcebook for the Technocracy
The Rich Bastard's Guide to Magick	November 3, 2021	—N/a	Onyx Path Publishing	Sourcebook for wealthy mages' use of magic
Welcome to the Rock: A Technocracy Reloaded Jumpstart	December 15, 2021	—N/a	Onyx Path Publishing	Companion to Technocracy: Reloaded, containing brief rules, an adventure, and pre-made characters
The Operative's Dossier	June 15, 2022	—N/a	Onyx Path Publishing	Companion to Technocracy: Reloaded
Sorcerer	August 3, 2022	—N/a	Onyx Path Publishing	Sourcebook for sorcerers
Victorian Age	January 11, 2023	—N/a	Onyx Path Publishing	Sourcebook for mages in the Victorian era, in 1880–1897. Also referred to as Victorian Mage.
Lore of the Traditions	September 20, 2023	—N/a	Onyx Path Publishing	Sourcebook for all the mage traditions
Séance on St. James Street: A Victorian Age Mage Jumpstart	June 5, 2024	—N/a	Onyx Path Publishing	Victorian Mage jumpstart
Weird Wonders & Revolutionary Magick	August 21, 2024	—N/a	Onyx Path Publishing	Magical items and spells from the Victorian era
Bizarre Tales and Unusual Characters	December 18, 2024	—N/a	Onyx Path Publishing	Sourcebook of characters and story hooks for Mage: The Ascension 20th Anniversary Edition
Faces of Magick	January 22, 2025	—N/a	Onyx Path Publishing	Sourcebook containing characters
Forgotten Ones & Forbidden Orders	January 22, 2025	—N/a	Onyx Path Publishing	Sourcebook for organizations outside the mage traditions

== Compilations ==
Mage: The Ascension game book compilations
Title	Original release	ISBN	Publisher	Notes
Mage Chronicles Volume 1	December 1996	1-56504-415-0	White Wolf Publishing	Compilation of The Book of Chantries and Digital Web
Mage Chronicles Volume 2	October–November 1997	1-56504-443-6	White Wolf Publishing	Compilation of Ascension's Right Hand and Halls of the Arcanum
Mage Chronicles Volume 3	1997	1-56504-125-9	White Wolf Publishing	Compilation of Loom of Fate and the World of Darkness crossover book The Chaos Factor
Technocracy Assembled 1	February–April 1998	1-56504-418-5	White Wolf Publishing	Compilation the first editions of Technocracy: Iteration X, Technocracy: N.W.O., and Technocracy: Progenitors
The Traditions Gathered 1: Songs of Science	June–August 1998	1-56504-445-2	White Wolf Publishing	Compilation of the first editions of Tradition Book: Order of Hermes, Tradition Book: Sons of Ether, and Tradition Book: Virtual Adepts
The Traditions Gathered 2: Blood and Dreams	February 1999	1-56504-446-0	White Wolf Publishing	Compilation of the first editions of Tradition Book: Cult of Ecstasy, Tradition Book: Dreamspeakers, and Tradition Book: Verbena
The Traditions Gathered 3: Swords of Faith	1999	1-56504-447-9	White Wolf Publishing	Compilation of the first editions of Tradition Book: Akashic Brotherhood, Tradition Book: Celestial Chorus, and Tradition Book: Euthanatos
Technocracy Assembled 2	2000	1-56504-419-3	White Wolf Publishing	Compilation of the first editions of Technocracy: Syndicate and Technocracy: Void Engineers
