= Scion (role-playing game) =

Series of role-playing games

Scion: Hero
- Scion: Hero cover, featuring Eric Donner as drawn by Michael Komarck.
- Designers: John Chambers (First Edition); Neall Raemonn Price (Second edition) Authors (First Edition): Justin Achilli, Alan Alexander, Carl Bowen, Bill Bridges, Duncan Harris, Michael Lee, Peter Schaefer, James Stewert, and Andrew Watts Authors (Second Edition): Dale Andrade, Dave Brookshaw, Laura Dasnoit, Tanay Dutta, Danielle Lauzon, Meghan Fitzgerald, Kieron Gillen, Chris Handforth, Matthew Herron, James Mendez Hodes, Eloy Lasanta, Charlie Raspin, Lauren Roy, Allen Turner, Malcolm Sheppard, Monica Speca, Chris Spivey, Travis Stout, Geoffrey McVey, Vera Vartainian, P.A Vazquez, Ben Woerner, and Tara Zuber
- Publishers: White Wolf Publishing; Onyx Path Publishing
- Publication: April 2007 (First Edition); June 5, 2019 (Second Edition)
- Genres: Contemporary fantasy
- Systems: Storyteller (First Edition); Storypath (Second Edition)

Scion is a series of role-playing games published by White Wolf, Inc and Onyx Path Publishing. The first core rule book, Scion: Hero. was released on April 13, 2007. The second volume, Scion: Demigod, was released on September 12, 2007, and the third, Scion: God, was released on January 23, 2008. The Scion Companion began release in sections March 2008, as a PDF direct download. Scion: Ragnarok was released on January 21, 2009. A second edition was announced in August 2012, changing the setting and also updating the system from the previous Storytelling System to the new Storypath system. This second edition was released for public purchase on June 5, 2019. A third edition was announced in June 2026, with the intent of updating the rules to the Storypath Ultra set.

== Setting ==
Scion is a role-playing game wherein players take on the roles of mortal descendants of gods tasked with working as the hands of their parents in the mortal world; while the first edition focused on a singular antagonist in the form of the recently escaped Titans (powerful, primordial embodiments of concepts such as water, chaos or light), the second edition does not automatically place this at the forefront.

The pantheons presented draw from mythology across the world, giving players the ability to associate their characters with any of the pantheons presented in the game. Portrayals of the gods differ between editions, ranging from a minor renaming (e.g. the Greek Gods were renamed from the "Dodekatheoi" to simply the "Theoi") to major changes (e.g. the first edition treats the African diaspora's Loa as a single pantheon, whereas second edition makes a distinction between the Yoruban Orisha and the African diaspora religions' Lwa).

Pantheon	First Edition	Second Edition
West African	Hero (First Edition Core)	Origin (Second Edition Core) — As the Orisha; Mysteries of the World — As the Loa
American Folklore	Companion	N/A
World War II Allied Nations	Companion	N/A
Atlantean	Demigod	Mysteries of the World
Aztec	Hero (First Edition Core)	Origin (Second Edition Core)
Chinese	Companion	Origin (Second Edition Core)
Egyptian	Hero (First Edition Core)	Origin (Second Edition Core)
Gaulish	Écran du Conteur	Mysteries of the World
Greek	Hero (First Edition Core)	Origin (Second Edition Core)
Indian	Companion	Origin (Second Edition Core)
Irish	Companion	Origin (Second Edition Core)
Japanese	Hero (First Edition Core)	Origin (Second Edition Core)
Norse	Hero (First Edition Core)	Origin (Second Edition Core)
Ojibwe	N/A	Origin (Second Edition Core)
Persian	Yazata: The Persian Gods	Mysteries of the World
Mesopotamian	N/A	Demigod
Incan	N/A	Demigod
Polynesian	N/A	Demigod
Mongolian	N/A	Demigod
Slavic	N/A	Demigod
Cthulhu Mythos	N/A	Masks of the Mythos
Welsh	N/A	Once and Future
Taíno	N/A	God
Visayan	N/A	God
Canaanite	N/A	God
Buddhist	N/A	God
Maya	N/A	God

== Differences between editions ==
Scion changed drastically between its first and second editions. While the first edition presented an Earth effectively identical to the real one, the second presented instead a setting literally referred to as "The World," wherein Abrahamic faiths did not so completely overtake Europe, let alone the rest of the world. As such, while The World is much like the real world on a surface level, other pantheons are still widely recognized and worshiped throughout. Further, the existence of gods and other supernatural entities is presented as generally acknowledged as fact rather than faith, although rarely present in anyone's day-to-day life.

With the updated Storypath system, the mechanism of advancement has changed; Scion players accumulate Experience and grow in power though Deeds, goals for their characters to experience or accomplish. While Legend continues to be the most significant measure of a Scion's growing power, and still measures the thresholds past which a Hero becomes a Demigod, and then a full-fledged deity, it is no longer increased by the expenditure of experience points but directly by the accomplishment of deeds.

The nature of demigod-hood has significantly altered: while previously it was a relatively natural progression of power that had few survivors merely owing to increasing scope of danger in a growing war against the Titans, the second edition plays up the liminal state of Demigods by making it explicitly temporary: A scion who has moved beyond being a "mere" Hero finds herself on the road to apotheosis, passing through a series of trials and constructing a larger-than-life mythic identity called a Mantle in the process. While Heroes can theoretically return from death, a Demigod who passes a certain point of advancement can no longer do so; should they die, it becomes the natural terminus of their story. As such, some mortal cultural heroes are demigods in-setting, whose deaths and failures marked where their own pursuit of godhood failed. They have left behind their incomplete Mantles, however; a hero who wishes to do so may take one up and try to complete it, succeeding where their predecessor failed, overwriting their death with the new hero's own triumph and becoming the deity that the initial hero wanted to be. A scion may also, at the point of apotheosis, try to take the identity of an existing god, either by wresting it from them, accepting a lesser mantle from that god, or by surrendering their identity, effectively declaring that they were always an incarnation of that deity.

The options of player characters has also greatly diversified, with more human options such as prophets, sorcerers, and saints, as well as supernatural entities such as Kitsune, Satyrs, and skin-changing Therianthropes, who may or may not claim patronage or descent from a higher power. Even the Scions themselves have become more diverse: instead of being universally blood descendants of the gods, they may now include those who have been chosen by the god (gaining their favor either by an affinity of fate or a special bloodline), created whole cloth, or even an Incarnate Scion: a mortal guise of a deceased god in the world.

The nature of the relationship between the world, the Gods, and Fate has altered: as the Gods create myths of themselves, they alter the world not just going forward, but retroactively: a newly ascended god may find herself in her pantheon's prayers and traditions going back centuries before her birth. Such myths can birth new facets of a deity; many gods have developed multiple Mantles over time. This process gave rise, in-setting, to the Loa from the Orisha, and likewise covers the correspondence between the Greek and Roman gods.

Furthermore, while the Titans still exist, they are less universally antagonistic: while the Greek Theoi regard them largely as dangerous foes who must be opposed, the Shen of China are more inclined to try to incorporate them into their hierarchy and give them a job and purpose within the Celestial Bureaucracy, while the Orisha explicitly regard the difference as no more than a political designation for enemies rather than a term possessing any material or metaphysical distinction. The game explicitly intends for the presentation and relevance of antagonistic titans to be to adjustable to a given group's tastes.

In the Titanomachy sourcebook the titans and their relationship to the gods is given a spotlight. While the previous edition allowed the Titans to "adopt" a willing scion of a god as one of their own, they may now create progeny directly in the same ways as the gods; these children can join the ranks of their parents just like the progeny of the divine can. Even fallen titans (such as Ymir) may return if a Titanic scion assumes their Mantle, while the multiple facets of the gods reflected in their Mantles means that some can exist as both God and Titan.

Dragons are also introduced as a new faction in the second edition, here presented as pre-human entities whose reign was brought to an end by the ascendance of the gods and humanity. Dragons are greatly focused on memory: resistant to the rewriting of history that the gods do, they remember all pasts that were, and even slain dragons still exist in a communal pool of memories. They exist in hiding, grouped into Flights (based both on philosophy and geography) and work through Heirs—humans who have been bestowed a fragment of a Dragon's might, analogous to divine Scions—who can ultimately embrace that power, shed their humanity, and join the ranks of their patron. Much like titans, deceased dragons can return from death if an heir decides to become that dragon upon their final ascension.

== System ==
Scion uses a rules system similar to the Storyteller system made popular by the World of Darkness, but is not part of that setting. While the first edition of Scion modified the core system of Exalted: Second Edition, the new edition has a new core system related to it, but with an explicit design goal of being able to handle the entire range of the game (from mundane mortal humans all the way to full-fledged divinity) without breaking down. For more information, refer to the Storypath System section of the Storyteller system page.

== Books ==
- [WW75000] Scion: Hero (2007)
- [WW75001] Scion: Demigod (2007)
- [WW75002] Scion: God (2007)
- [WW75008] Scion: Ragnarök (2009)
- [WW75012] Scion Companion (2009)
- [WW75013] Scion: Seeds of Tomorrow (2009) (PDF only)
- [WW75014] Scion: Yazata: The Persian Gods (2010)
- [WW76002] Scion: Wolfsheim (2009) (PDF only)
- Scion: Liberty Road (2009) (PDF only)
- Scion: Écran du Conteur (France only)
- Scion: Extras: Supplemental (Yet Can Be Somewhat Useful On Occasion) Scions (2013)
- Frost Giant Butt Warriors (2019)
- [SCI001] Scion: Book One - Origin (2019)
- [SCI002] Scion: Book Two - Hero (2nd Edition) (2019)
- A Light Extinguished (A Jumpstart for Scion Second Edition) (2019)
- Heroes for the World: (Ready-Made Characters for Scion Second Edition) (2019)
- Mythical Denizens (2020)
- Mysteries of the World: The Scion 2nd edition Companion (2020)
- [SCI003] Scion Companion: Mysteries of the World (2020)
- [SCI015] Titanomachy: A Collection of Threats (2020)
- Storypath Tasty Bit: Annie X (2021)
- Storypath Tasty Bit: Car Competition (2021)
- Storypath Tasty Bit: Zeus! We Just Wanna Talk! (2021)
- Storypath Tasty Bit: So Now You're a Hero (2022)
- Scion Player's Guide: Saints and Monsters (2022)
- Storypath Tasty Bit: Scion High (2022)
- Storypath Tasty Bit: Making History Modern (2022)
- Scion: Boon Companions (2022)
- [SCI011] Scion: Book Three - Demigod (2nd Edition) (2023)
- [SCI012] Masks of the Mythos (2023)
- [SCI014] Scion: Dragon (2023)
- Scion: Once and Future (2023)
- Live by the Blade (A Jumpstart for Scion: Dragon) (2023)
- Scion: Realms of Magic and Mystery (2023)
- The Timeless Tomb of Tir'za'nthel (2023)
- Scion: Families and Thunderbolts (2023)
- Scion: Path to Apotheosis (2024)
- Scion: No Gods, No Masters (2024)
- Scion: God (2nd Edition) (2024)
- Scion: Demigod Companion (2025)
- Scion: Dragon Companion (2025)
- Titans Rising (2025)
- Mythic Shards Storyguide Reference Book (2025)
- Scion: Dragon Tasty-Bit Compilation (2025)
- Rock Gods & Road Trips (2025)
- Scion: Wild Hunt (2025)
- Scion: God Player's Guide (2026)
- Scion: War Games (2026)
- Gifts of the Titans (2026)

== Reception ==
=== Reviews ===
- Rebel Times #4 and #37
  - Scion expasions Demigod, God, Ragnarök and Companion discussed in Rebel Times issues #38-41
