= The Book of Shadows (Mage: The Ascension) =

- Cover art
- Publishers: White Wolf Publishing
- Publication: 1993
- Genres: Tabletop role-playing game supplement
- Systems: Storyteller System
- Parent games: Mage: The Ascension
- Series: World of Darkness
- ISBN: 1-56504-119-4

The Book of Shadows is a supplement published by White Wolf Publishing in 1993 for the fantasy role-playing game Mage: The Ascension.

== Contents ==
The Book of Shadows is a 208-page softcover book that presents new options for players. The long list of contributing writers includes Writers: Emrey Barnes, Bill Bridges, Steve Brown, Phil Brucato, Brian Campbell, Sam Chupp, Beth Fischi, Don Frew, Daniel Greenberg, William Hale, Harry Heckel, Sam Inabinet, Darren McKeeman, Judith A. McLaughlin, Jim Moore, Kevin Murphy, John R. Robey, Kathleen Ryan, Steve Wieck, Ehrik Winters, and Teeuwynn Woodruff. Interior art was by James Crabtree, Scott Johnson, Matt Korteling, Robert MacNeill, Dan Smith, Joshua Gabriel Timbrook, Lawrence Allen Williams, and Jeff Wright, and the cover photo was by Larry Schnelli.

New rules for play include

- new character merits and flaws
- new spells and talismans
- new material concerning Traditions and Conventions
- martial arts
- familiars
- "Certamen" duels

== Reception ==
In the December 1994 edition of Dragon (Issue #212), Allen Varney liked the product, saying that it "shows a wide variety of viewpoints, but remarkably consistent quality." Varney was impressed by the sheer magnitude of new material offered, as well as the narrative at the beginning of each chapter that "saturates the reader with story." He had issues with the "unsightly" book design featuring text "printed against gray-screened backgrounds in a variety of distracting patterns." He also noted the many editing errors, saying, "White Wolf staffers are only starting to pass disciple rank in the Sphere of Proofreading." However, he concluded that this book is "essential to Mage game players and Storytellers alike. Its imagination, intense commitment to story values, and subtle messages of tolerance make it a pleasure to read and a vital tool for understanding the game’s complex campaign world."

Pyramid magazine reviewed The Book of Shadows and stated that "The age-old argument of realism versus playability has mutated in '90s game design, with "coolness" now standing firmly on the opposite side of utility. The Book of Shadows marks a new plateau in the advancement of the Mage line, as it works toward further defining the vague world (and rules)".

== Reviews ==
- Coleção Dragão Brasil
