= Le Monde des Ténèbres: France =

1997 TRPG supplement

- Cover art by John Bolton, titled Succuba
- Designers: Fabrice Colin
- Illustrators: Joël Belin, John Bolton, Caryad, B. Daubmann, Thierry Gayrard, Nathalie Hertz, François Launet, and C. Poireau
- Writers: Stéphane Adamiac, Stéphane Bura, David Calvo, Fabrice Colin, Gérard Gayruad, Olivier Legrand, David Osmont, G.E. Ranne
- Publishers: Ludis International
- Publication: January 1997
- Genres: Tabletop role-playing game supplement
- Languages: French
- Systems: Storyteller System
- Series: World of Darkness
- ISBN: 2-910839-30-3 (clothed cover): 2-910839-31-1 (nude cover)

Le Monde des Ténèbres: France (French for "The World of Darkness: France") is a tabletop role-playing game supplement published in French by Ludis International in January 1997, for use with the games in White Wolf Publishing's World of Darkness series. It interprets France for the series' gothic-punk setting, and presents information on the region related to vampires, werewolves, mages, wraiths, and changelings, along with story hooks and pre-made characters, and introduces two new types of fae to the series. Ludis International planned to follow it with a book about Paris in June 1997, but this never materialized, and the publisher closed down a year later.

The book was designed by Fabrice Colin, and was one of the first World of Darkness books to not be developed by White Wolf Publishing; it was made due to the series' popularity in France. The production was lengthy due to the large amount of content, and saw delays causing it to miss the 1996 holiday season. The supplement was well received by critics for its usefulness to French players and the originality of its mage, wraith, and changeling chapters. It also performed well commercially, topping the French tabletop role-playing game sales charts for the two-month period following its release.

== Content ==
Le Monde des Ténèbres: France is a sourcebook for use with the tabletop role-playing games in the World of Darkness series, including Vampire: The Masquerade, Werewolf: The Apocalypse, Mage: The Ascension, Wraith: The Oblivion, and Changeling: The Dreaming, using the Storyteller System. It interprets France for the series' setting – a gothic-punk interpretation of the real world – covering the local supernatural beings of each of the five games, with one chapter devoted to each:

- The vampire chapter describes French vampiric society, its history, how it is divided into fiefdoms ruled by marquesses that in turn serve under the French vampire prince François Villon, and how that monarchical system is opposed by the Praxist vampire faction.
- The werewolf chapter describes werewolves' history, relevant geography, and werewolf tribes. It also contains a 28-page diary by the wandering American werewolf Cameron, interspersed with information about the setting.
- The mage chapter describes historical landmarks and French mage traditions, and the Technocracy's (Note: The Technocracy is a faction of mages in Mage: The Ascension.) influence over the region.
- The wraith chapter describes wraiths' history and the world of undead spirits in France, and presents various locations. It is presented as a compilation of notes, interviews, and book excerpts.
- The changeling chapter describes changelings' history and the setting, and introduces two new types of fae to the series: the Morganed and the Korred.

The book also includes story hooks that can be incorporated into campaigns, and a set of pre-made characters intended for the storyteller (Note: The person leading the game is called the "storyteller" in World of Darkness games, a role called "gamemaster" or "dungeon master" in other role-playing games.) to use; these include statistics of varying degree of detail, with the least available for the vampire characters.

== Production ==
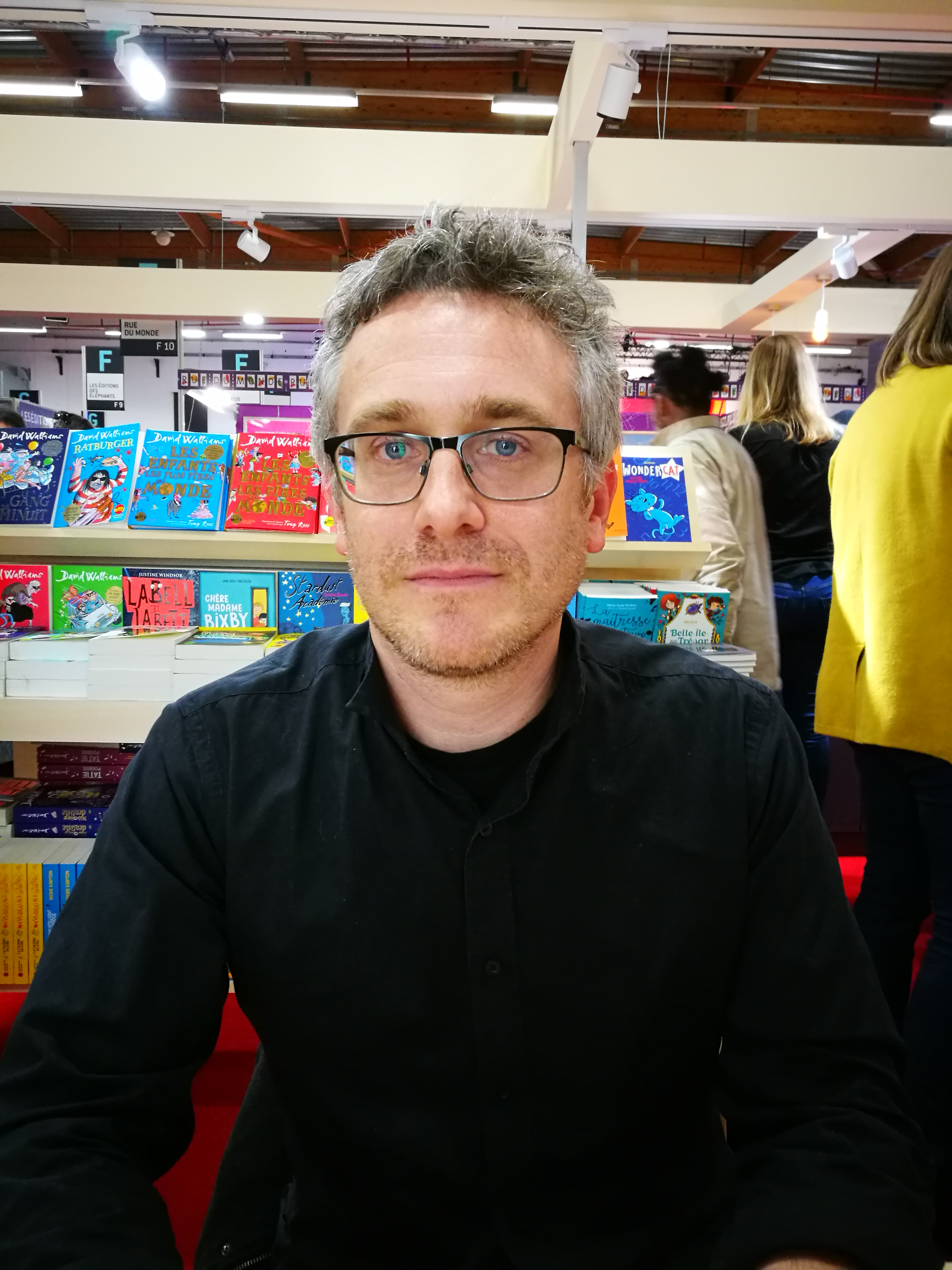
The book was designed by Fabrice Colin (pictured in 2018).

Le Monde des Ténèbres: France was designed by Fabrice Colin, who wrote it together with Stéphane Adamiac, Stéphane Bura, David Calvo, Gérard Gayraud, Olivier Legrand, David Osmont, and G.E. Ranne. The art team for the project included the art director Benoît Schiex, interior artists Joël Belin, Caryad, B. Daubmann, Thierry Gayrard, Nathalie Hertz, François Launet, and C. Poireau, and the cover artist John Bolton. Bolton painted the art piece used for the cover, titled Succuba, in 1996, depicting a nude vampire woman; he also painted a variant where she wears a negligée. Succuba was later reprinted as part of the art book series Art Fantastix in 2001.

The supplement was created due to the World of Darkness series' popularity in France, and was one of the first World of Darkness books to not be developed by White Wolf Publishing; the earlier Vampire: The Masquerade book Blood Nativity (1991) had been published by Atlas Games, but was still developed by White Wolf Publishing staff, and even after Le Monde des Ténèbres: France it remained uncommon for White Wolf Publishing to let other companies develop World of Darkness books. Due to the book's large amount of content, the production was lengthy, and it suffered delays, missing the targeted 1996 holiday season.

French publisher Ludis International released Le Monde des Ténèbres: France in French in January 1997 as a 247-page hardcover book, on license from White Wolf Publishing. They made it available in two editions: one featuring the nude Succuba cover, and one featuring the negligée variant, the latter of which was sold for a lower price; outside of the differences in cover art and their different ISBNs, the two editions are identical. An English translation of the book was planned as of January 1997.

Ludis International planned to follow Le Monde des Ténèbres: France with further sourcebooks, starting with a book planned to be titled Paris by Night or World of Darkness: Paris, which was scheduled for release in June 1997, but never released; over the next year and a half, the publisher's books kept seeing delays, and by June 1998, they had closed down. Arkhane Asylum Publishing, another French publisher, eventually did release two further World of Darkness books about France in 2019, for use with the game Vampire: The Dark Ages: the setting sourcebook France by Night, and the adventure module L'Hérésie Cathare ("The Cathar Heresy").

== Reception ==
Reception
Review scores
Source	Rating
Backstab	8/10

Le Monde des Ténèbres: France was well received by critics, and performed well commercially. It debuted as the highest selling tabletop role-playing game book in France for the February–March 1997 period, before falling off the bimonthly French top 10 sales charts by the April–May 1997 period.

Backstab and Casus Belli both thought it was an excellent supplement for French World of Darkness players, with imaginative and original content, particularly the mage, wraith, and changeling chapters; Backstab thought the wraith chapter was the best part of the supplement, while Casus Belli preferred the mage chapter, calling it fascinating, with magic descriptions of interest even to those who do not plan to set their games in France. On the other hand, Backstab considered the werewolf chapter weak, with the exception of the writing in the werewolf diary, which they often found funny. Although the vampire chapter was considered among the least original, Casus Belli still liked its story hooks for each of the vampire fiefdoms in the setting.

The coverage of the setting was generally well received, with Casus Belli appreciating the authenticity the French authors could bring. Backstab noted that some might be disappointed in a lack of coverage of their own city; Casus Belli thought that it struck a good balance between coverage and leaving things up to players' imaginations, although noted that the lack of description of Umbra (Note: Umbra is another plane of existence in Werewolf: The Apocalypse.) was a major omission. They also thought that the setting felt cohesive and unified, despite covering five different supernatural beings, making all chapters of use regardless of which of the five games one plays. One criticism Backstab had was regarding technical issues with the character statistics, which they thought seemed badly implemented.

The book's art and visual design was well received, with Backstab calling them "bold and inspired", particularly the art pieces in the wraith chapter. Casus Belli liked Bolton's cover art, but thought one would have to really consider whether it was worth paying more for the edition with the nude Succuba.
