= Beyond the Barriers: The Book of Worlds =

Role-playing game supplement

- Cover art by Robert Dixon
- Publishers: White Wolf Publishing
- Publication: 1996
- Genres: Tabletop role-playing game supplement
- Systems: Storyteller System
- Parent games: Mage: The Ascension
- Series: World of Darkness
- ISBN: 1-56504-434-7

Beyond the Barriers: The Book of Worlds is a supplement published by White Wolf Publishing in 1996 for the horror role-playing game Mage: The Ascension.

== Contents ==
Beyond the Barriers: The Book of Worlds describes parallel universes called the worlds of Umbra to which mages can travel. Three are described in the book (low, medium and high), and notable places in each one are outlined. The book also covers difficult to define realms, kingdoms built by Mages, Shards, and Shade Realms. A bestiary describes various creatures that inhabit these planes, and the book also provides rules for travelling amongst the planes.

== Publication history ==
White Wolf Publications first published Mage: The Ascension in 1993 as part of its World of Darkness series of horror role-playing games. White Wolf subsequently released many supplements in support of the game, including 1996's Beyond the Barriers: The Book of Worlds, a 200-page softcover book designed by Phil Brucato, Richard Dansky, Heather Heckel, Harry L. Heckel, Chris Hind, Angel Leigh McCoy, Judith A. McLaughlin, James A. Moore, Nicky Rea, and Kathleen Ryan, with interior art by Ron Brown, Richard Clark, Jason Felix, Heather J. 'Echo' McKinney-Chernik, Paul S. Phillips, Andrew Ritchie, Andrew M. Trabbold, and cover art by Robert Dixon.

== Reception ==
In Issue 15 of Arcane, Adam Tinworth was somewhat ambiguous about this book, commenting, "Is this book a good idea? Yes. Is it an ambitious idea? Yes. Is it successful? Only partially." He concluded by giving the book a below average rating of 6 out of 10.

The December 1999 issue of Envoyer (Issue #38) commented that this book was useful because it contained information how to design crossover adventures with Werewolf: The Apocalypse.

== Other reviews ==
- Casus Belli V1 #100 (Dec 1996) p. 16
- Valkyrie #14 (1997)
- Ringbote #13 (Jul/Aug 1997, p. 100, in German)
- Envoyer #40
