= The Book of Chantries =

1994 tabletop role-playing game supplement

- Cover art by Scott Hampton and Michelle Prahler
- Publishers: White Wolf Publishing
- Publication: January 1994
- Genres: Tabletop role-playing game supplement
- Systems: Storyteller System
- Parent games: Mage: The Ascension
- Series: World of Darkness
- ISBN: 1-56504-084-8

The Book of Chantries is a supplement published by White Wolf Publishing in January 1994 for the fantasy role-playing game Mage: The Ascension.

== Content ==
The book describes various Chantries (home bases or headquarters for mages). The Chantries range from something as small and temporary as a 1978 Volkswagen microbus to ancient and powerful interdimensional fortresses. Important personalities that inhabit each Chantry are also described, creating a virtual list of the most important mages in the world.

The book shows referees how to allow players to design a Chantry using a construction-point system. A short adventure called "Harvest Time" is also included.

== Publication history ==
The Book of Chantries is a 182-page softcover book written by Steven C. Brown, Phil Brucato, and Robert Hatch, with interior art by Joshua Gabriel Timbrook, Larry MacDougall, Quinton Hoover, Drew Tucker, Lawrence Allen Williams, Craig Gelmore, Elliott, Andrew Robinson, Jeff Menges, and cover art by Scott Hampton and Michelle Prahler. It was released by White Wolf Publishing in January 1994. A French translation was published in July 1999 by Hexagonal.

== Reception ==
Fabrice Colin of Casus Belli felt that this supplement provided the raison d'etre of being a mage that had been missing in the original rules. "More than a varied gallery of ready-to-use NPCs, it is above all a precious guide on the lifestyle, the motivations and mentalities of the mages, as many elements were rather lacking in the basic rules." Colin concluded that "A wise Storyteller can hardly do without this."

Allen Varney of Dragon liked the supplement, saying it "provide[s] important campaign resources for skilled Storytellers. The Chantries work not only as headquarters but as rich sources of NPCs and creative story ideas."

== Reviews ==
- Casus Belli V1 #94 (May 1996) p. 26-29
- Casus Belli V1 #121 (Aug-Sep 1999)
- Rollespilsmagasinet Fønix (Danish) (Issue 2 - May/June 1994)
