= Loom of Fate =

1994 horror role-playing game supplement

- Cover art by Henry Gordon Higginbotham
- Designers: Chris Hind
- Illustrators: Henry Gordon Higginbotham; Joshua Gabriel Timbrook; Jeff Wright
- Publishers: White Wolf Publishing
- Publication: February 1994
- Genres: Supernatural RPG
- Systems: Storyteller System
- Parent games: Mage: The Ascension
- Series: World of Darkness
- ISBN: 1-56504-082-1

Loom of Fate is an adventure module published by White Wolf Publishing in 1994, for use with the supernatural tabletop role-playing game Mage: The Ascension, and is part of the World of Darkness series.

== Plot summary ==
Loom of Fate is the first full-length adventure published for Mage: The Ascension. The player characters are called to San Francisco as the city's magical Pattern, held together by the dying creature Cob, an Umbrood Pattern Spider, suffers disruptions. Cob's potential replacement is a young girl being pursued by multiple groups, and the mages will encounter cycle-gang demons, mutant alligators, a ghost, and Technocracy thugs.

== Publication history ==
White Wolf released the first game of the World of Darkness series, Vampire: The Masquerade, in 1991, and followed annually with a new game, the second being Werewolf: The Apocalypse (1992), and the third being Mage: The Ascension (1993). In 1994, White Wolf released Loom of Fate, a 72-page softcover book containing Mage's first full-length adventure, designed by Chris Hind, with cover art by Henry Gordon Higginbotham, and interior art by Joshua Gabriel Timbrook and Jeff Wright.

== Reception ==
In Issue 212 of Dragon (December 1994), Allen Varney commented, "You'll like Loom's fluid and various plots, the atmospheric Umbra of San Francisco, the weird NPCs, and the appendix that describes a mage-inspired Tarot Arcana." However, Varney thought that if the players failed in their quest in this adventure, "the fail-safe option that rescues San Francisco is totally bogus." Varney concluded, "Given that this is the only full-length Mage adventure to date, I wish Loom of Fate offered more obvious chances to kick off an ongoing chronicle, but as it stands—alone—it gives good value."

In Issue 79 of the French games magazine Casus Belli , Tristan Lhomme and Fabrice Colin called this "An excellent adventure, subtle as can be, which represents a good first approach to the Mage universe."

== Other reviews and commentary ==
- Alarums & Excursions (Issue 267 - Nov 1997)
