= The Book of Crafts =

Role-playing game supplement

- Cover art
- Publishers: White Wolf Publishing
- Publication: September–October 1996
- Genres: Tabletop role-playing game supplement
- Systems: Storyteller System
- Parent games: Mage: The Ascension
- Series: World of Darkness
- ISBN: 1-56504-435-5

The Book of Crafts is a supplement published by White Wolf Publishing in 1996 for the fantasy role-playing game Mage: The Ascension.

== Contents ==
The Book of Crafts is a sourcebook describing Crafts — independent groups of mages outside the established groups outlined in the Mage: The Ascension rulebook. They include:

- Wu-Keng and Wu-Lung of China
- Hem-Ka Sobk of Egypt
- Amazonian Sisters of Hippolyta
- the fallen Solificati, now known as the Children of Knowledge
- a sect within the Templars
- Kopea Loei of Hawaii
- Bata'a

The history, culture, beliefs, organization, practices, traditions and magical style of each Craft are detailed. In addition, a variety of spells developed by each Craft is documented.

== Production ==
The Book of Crafts was designed by Aron Anderson, Phil Brucato, James Estes, Looking Eagle, Deena McKinney, Wade Racine, Andrew Ragland, Derek Pearcy, Kathleen Ryan, and Lucien Soulban, with interior artwork by James Daly, Pia Guerra, Anthony Hightower, Mark Jackson, Robert Macneil, Shea Anton Pensa, Alex Sheikman, and Ron Spencer, and cover art by Ash Arnett and Matt Milberger.

The Book of Crafts was released by White Wolf Publishing in September–October 1996, as a 144-page softcover book. It has since then also been released as an ebook.

== Reception ==
In the Christmas 1996 edition of Arcane (Issue 14), Adam Tinworth liked the book, saying that the new Crafts "are thoughtfully, deeply and, most of all, readably covered." Timworth thought the book had "a multitude of potential uses in a Mage game." However, he pointed out that " to make the most of this book, as with many other recent Mage releases, you're going to need several other sourcebooks." He concluded by giving the book an above average score of 8 out 10, saying, "In a game as dominated by idea and cultural belief as Mage, a book this rich in both is invaluable. While none of the Crafts are as easy to use as those presented in the main rules, for an experienced Mage group this is a pretty essential purchase"

In the September 1997 edition of Dragon (Issue #239), Rick Swan liked the book, giving it an above average rating of 5 out of 6, and saying "Mage aficionados should find The Book of Crafts a delight; the factions described here are more appealing — and more gruesome — than those in the Mage rulebook.
