= Digital Web =

Tabletop role-playing game supplement

- Cover art for the first edition
- Designers: Daniel Greenberg; Harry Heckel; Darren McKeemen
- Publishers: White Wolf Publishing
- Publication: February–April 1994 (ed. 1); October 1998 (ed. 2)
- Genres: Tabletop role-playing game supplement
- Systems: Storyteller System
- Parent games: Mage: The Ascension
- Series: World of Darkness
- ISBN: 1-56504-106-2 (ed. 1): 1-56504-426-6 (ed. 2)

Digital Web is a tabletop role-playing game supplement originally published by White Wolf Publishing in February–April 1994 for their game Mage: The Ascension. A second edition, Digital Web 2.0, followed in October 1998.

== Contents ==
Mage: The Acension supposes that everyone in today's world carries the innate ability to do magic. Those that are unaware of their powers are "sleepers"; those who have become aware of their ability to reshape reality are the Awakened. Digital Web explores those mages called Cybernauts who use the internet as a manifestation of magic power. Divided into five chapters, the book covers:

- the Cybernaut's three main forms of ingress into the Web (Sensory Visitation using virtual reality goggles; Astral Immersion, projecting one's mind into the Web; and Holistic Immersion, transforming oneself into raw data to be uploaded into the Web.)
- various special areas of the magical Web
- viruses and other dangers that lurk in the Web
- a history of the magical Web, from Alexander Graham Bell to Alan Turing.
- Explanations for how magic operates within the Web
- suggested ways to use the Digital Web in other White Wolf role-playing games set in the modern world such as Vampire: The Masquerade and Werewolf: The Apocalypse.
- Two brief scenarios, "Recursive Tale" and "Deus ex Machina".
- Various notable personalities within the Web
- Talismans that can be used within the Web

The book also includes a three-page short story, and an appendix with further sources for the reader to explore.

== Production ==
Digital Web was originally designed by Daniel Greenberg, Harry Heckel, and Darren McKeemen, with additional material provided by John Cooper, Jonathan Sill, Heather Curatola, Lee Chen, Bill Bridges, Brian Campbell, and Brad Freeman. The book was illustrated by James Crabtree, Darryl Elliot, Joshua Gabriel Timbrook, Quinton Hoover, and Dan Smith, with cover art by John Zeleznik.

White Wolf Publishing released the first edition of the book in February–April 1994, and the second, Digital Web 2.0, in October 1998; both have since also been released as ebooks.

== Reception ==
Rick Swan of Dragon called the premise of Digital Web "audacious", saying that it "reshapes cyberpunk like so much modeling clay." But despite this, Swan found the book "hard to digest [...] the text is burdened with overstuffed sentences [...] and saturated with gobbledygook." He concluded by giving the book an average rating of 4 out of 6, saying "There's much to admire, particularly for those who believe that cyberpunk could stand to shed some cliches. But the text is so dense, so riddled with gamespeak and consumed by abstractions that a good portion of it borders on the incomprehensible. Digital Web is an impressive effort. But it needs a translator."

== Reviews ==
- Valkyrie #1 (Sept., 1994)
- Backstab #2 (Mar-Apr 1997)
- Backstab #14 (Mar-Apr 1999) (for Digital Web 2.0)
- Casus Belli V1 #94 (May 1996)
- Casus Belli V1 #102 (Feb 1997)
- Casus Belli V1 #105 (May 1997)
- Dragon #212 (Dec 1994)
