= Tradition Book: Celestial Chorus =

- Cover art for the first edition
- Publishers: White Wolf Publishing
- Publication: July 1996 (ed. 1); June 2001 (ed. 2)
- Genres: Tabletop role-playing game supplement
- Systems: Storyteller System
- Parent games: Mage: The Ascension
- Series: World of Darkness
- ISBN: 1-56504-411-8 (ed. 1): 1-56504-457-6 (ed. 2)

Tradition Book: Celestial Chorus is a tabletop role-playing game supplement originally published by White Wolf Publishing in July 1996 for their game Mage: The Ascension.

== Contents ==
Celestial Chorus is a supplement presented as if it were a series of extracts from the fictional codex The Book of Ages, the central work that the Celestial Chorus has revered for its entire existence.

== Publication history ==
Celestial Chorus is the fifth release in the Tradition Book series. The book was originally released by White Wolf Publishing in July 1996, with a second edition following in June 2001.

== Reception ==
Adam Tinworth reviewed Celestial Chorus for Arcane magazine, rating it a 5 out of 10 overall. Tinworth comments that "For any player keen to take on the playing of such a religious character, this book provides a valuable grounding in the origin of the movement. But crucial elements that both players and storytellers alike will be looking for are sadly lacking. This is something of a missed opportunity."

== Reviews ==
- Backstab #32 (Jul-Aug 2001)
