= Exalted (role-playing game) =

Tabletop high fantasy role-playing game

- Second edition cover
- Designers: Robert Hatch, Justin Achilli, Stephan Wieck, Andrew Bates, Dana Habecker, Sheri M. Johnson, Chris McDonough, Richard Thomas
- Directors: First edition: Robert Hatch; Geoffrey C. Grabowski; Second edition: John Chambers; Third edition: John Mørke; Holden Shearer; Robert Vance; Eric Minton
- Illustrators: Brian Glass
- Publishers: White Wolf Publishing
- Publication: 2001 (1st edition); 2006 (2nd edition); 2016 (3rd edition)
- Genres: High fantasy
- Systems: Storyteller System
- Age range: 12+
- Website: Official website

Exalted is a high fantasy tabletop role-playing game originally published by White Wolf Publishing in July 2001. The game is in its third edition as of 2016. It was originally created by Robert Hatch, Justin Achilli and Stephan Wieck, and was inspired by world mythologies and anime.

== Influences ==
The setting is strongly influenced by Tanith Lee's Tales from the Flat Earth, Michael Moorcock's Hawkmoon, Lord Dunsany's The Gods of Pegana and Yoshiaki Kawajiri's Ninja Scroll. Other influences include Glen Cook's The Black Company; Sean Stewart's Resurrection Man, The Night Watch, and Galveston; Homer's Odyssey, the Bible, and Wu Cheng'en's Journey to the West.

== System ==
The game uses ten-sided dice and a variation of the Storyteller System to arbitrate the action, and, along with many other RPGs, requires little beyond the rulebooks themselves, dice, pencil, and paper. The Exalted version of the rules were derived from the trilogy of White Wolf Publishing games Trinity (formerly known as Aeon), Aberrant, and Adventure! where the idea of a fixed target number of 7 or higher was first introduced.

Characters may be frequently presented with challenges that normal human beings, even within the context of the game, would find difficult, deadly, or simply impossible. However, as the chosen champions of greater powers, each Exalt possesses Charms, which may either enhance their natural capabilities or manifest as shows of great power. An Exalt with low-level Archery Charms might find her arrows hitting with preternatural accuracy, while greater faculty may allow her to shoot without difficulty to the edge of her vision, or turn a single arrow into a deadly rain of ammunition.

The Exalted frequently power their Charms with accumulated Essence, a universal energy that flows through and comprises Creation and other worlds. While their Essence is normally recovered slowly through rest, in the first two editions, they could also regain it more quickly by performing stunts, actions given special description and embellishment by the players. Stunts in the third edition no longer regenerate Essence, but combat automatically causes Essence stores to refill quickly. However, stunts continue to exist, and their primary benefit—adding extra dice to the actions they describe, thus enhancing the possibility of success—remains.

== History ==
Exalted has mechanical and thematic similarities to White Wolf's previous game series, the old World of Darkness, but exists in its own product line, called the Age of Sorrows. The game has a sales record on par with the company's flagship title, Vampire: The Masquerade. The second edition core rulebook achieved a sales ranking at number 23,558 on Amazon.com with a 4.5-star mean user review rating based on 31 user reviews as of January 2019.

The initial advertisements for Exalted placed the Age of Sorrows as the pre-history of the old World of Darkness. Meanwhile, some oWoD supplements also supported this. The Hunter Apocrypha gave a vision of the past that said Hunters gained their power from the broken shards of the souls of great heroes of a lost age, which seems to suggest Hunters carry fragments of Solar Essences. Likewise, the Kindred of the East supplement gave a structure of the Wheel of Ages (mirrored in the first edition books as the Ages of Man) that seemed to accommodate the integration of Exalted and the classic World of Darkness, the former the First and Second Age, and the latter being the Fifth Age.

However, once the game was released, the connections quickly became uncertain: names and themes from the World of Darkness line run throughout the material, but rarely in a way that suggested a direct connection between one and the other. Per the commentary of multiple developers, the connections are deliberately tenuous, allowing players to be free to treat it as a prehistory or as its own world as it may suit their individual game. The similarities between Exalted and the Chronicles of Darkness are even weaker, primarily intersecting only where the Chronicles reused material from its predecessor. The second edition briefly implies that its story is the prehistory of our own world on its back cover, but this idea is not explored in any depth beyond this. While the last book of the second edition would posit a modernized world with the Exalted, it was clearly a technologically advanced version of Creation – the world of Exalted – rather than Earth. In the third edition, most references to the World of Darkness or Chronicles of Darkness are treated more as inspirational material rather than anything important for the history of the setting or needed to understand it.

Shards of the Exalted Dream, the final second edition product, was published in January 2012. Development of the third edition was officially announced in October 2012. The crowdfunding campaign for the third edition from May 9 to June 8, 2013, reached its $60,000 funding goal within 18 minutes, raising a total of $684,755 and breaking Numenera's record for the most funded tabletop RPG Kickstarter. Backers received the PDF in October 2015, POD in April 2016, and the deluxe editions in March 2017.

Since then, the game has continued to be produced by Onyx Path Publishing through a license with Paradox Interactive, created as PDFs with print-on-demand options. In addition, major supplements have received crowdfunding for special print runs of the deluxe editions, which also fund additional material from stretch goals and limited rewards. As of December 2024, the sourcebooks for Dragon-Blooded, Lunar Exalted, Exigents, and Sidereal Exalted have been crowdfunded and now on sale; Abyssal Exalted and Alchemical Exalted have been crowdfunded and are currently as pre-layout manuscripts to backers; and Infernal Exalted is currently in development and planned for a late 2025 or early 2026 crowdfunding campaign.

In December 2019, Onyx Path Publishing announced it would be producing and crowdfunding Exalted: Essence, a streamlined version of the rules to introduce new players to Exalted's setting and mechanics. The Exalted: Essence core rulebook is explicitly not a new full edition, and is compatible with the third edition's setting and supplements, while presenting mechanics to play all ten canonical Exalt types in a simplified manner. It launched its Kickstarter campaign in May 2021, finishing with $349,260 from an initial goal of $35,000. The print on demand and PDF versions went on sale in June 2023 and a crowdfunding campaign is planned for a player's guide in 2025.

== Promotions ==
In March 2008, White Wolf Publishing unveiled a promotion that would allow 2,500 Dungeons & Dragons players to exchange their copy of their 3.5 Edition Player's Handbook for a copy of the second edition core rulebook. The promotion was called "Graduate your Game" and received mixed reviews from fans of both games. The success of this promotion was not revealed.

== Setting ==
=== Background ===
The history of the setting begins with the Primordials: vast entities akin to Greek primordial deities or the Outer Gods of H. P. Lovecraft's works, even going so far as to use similar epithets to the latter. They shaped Creation – a flat world of finite extent – from the primordial chaos, and placed the gods to watch over it.

In time, the gods decided to overthrow the Primordials, but were forbidden from taking arms against their makers. Instead, the most powerful of the gods imbued exceptional humans with their power (the titular Exalted) to fight for them. The blessings they bestowed (also known as Exaltations) would pass on to new champions with their death, allowing a new hero to rise when one fell. Upon victory, the gods retreated to the Heavenly city of Yu-Shan to oversee from on high, and left Creation to the Exalted and Humanity.

However, the Exalted suffer from the Great Curse uttered upon the dying breaths of the slain Primordials. The Solar Exalted—those empowered by the Unconquered Sun and mightiest among the Exalted—eventually grew decadent and corrupt from this influence, and were slaughtered in a massive insurrection known as the Usurpation by their servants and advisors. After the Usurpation, most of the Exaltations of the Solar Exalted were locked away, and an organization known as the Wyld Hunt was formed to kill all the others, and to drive the Lunar Exalted from the civilized lands of Creation.

During the intervening age, the Terrestrial Exalted became the rulers of the world, ruling in a shogunate. After the Great Contagion (a plague originating from the lands of the dead) and the Balorian Crusade (an invasion by the Fair Folk) wrought devastation across Creation, a young captain of the Dragon-Blooded armies gained access to powerful weapons of the First Age. With these, she saved Creation and then asserted her rulership over much of it, dubbing herself the Scarlet Empress. Nearly eight hundred years later—in the present day of the game—there are eleven Great Houses of the Realm, almost all of whom claim direct descent from the Empress.

Five years prior to the default starting point of the game, the Empress vanished. By the present of the game, it is believed she will not return, and the Realm stands on the brink of civil war. Simultaneously, the Solar Exaltations locked away have returned. With the Great Houses ignoring the threat of the Celestial Exalted to position themselves to take control of the Realm, the number of Solar Exalted in Creation is growing. Thus, the backdrop to the setting sees the newly arisen Solars (among various other heroes and villains) struggling to survive long enough to make their mark upon the fate of Creation, for good or for ill.

The flat world of Creation is the primary setting of Exalted. Creation has two continents, the Blessed Isle and an unnamed super-continent which covers the northern, eastern and southern edges of Creation, populated by many nations and tribes, with the settled regions along the inner coast of this super-continent being known collectively as the threshold. The Blessed Isle is located in the center of Creation. The Realm rules the Blessed Isle and its proximate archipelago directly, and indirectly rules numerous tributary states known as satrapies along the threshold.

Surrounding Creation is the infinite ocean of pure chaos known as the Wyld. The cosmology of Exalted also includes the Underworld, the celestial city of Yu-Shan, the demon realm of Malfeas, and the machine world of Autochthonia.

=== Types of Exalts ===
At the core of the setting, there are several different types of Exalted, any type of which could play the role of protagonist or antagonist of the game. The Exalted of Creation can be divided into two categories: Terrestrial Exalted and Celestial Exalted. Celestial Exalted, being the chosen of the Celestial Incarnae, are significantly more powerful than Terrestrial Exalted, and can live for millennia, but their numbers are limited by a fixed amount of Exaltations passing from mortal life to mortal life at any given time. Terrestrial Exalted are the Chosen of the Elemental Dragons; while less powerful, the Dragon-Blooded inherit Exaltation from their ancestors.

The Abyssal, Alchemical, Getimian, and Infernal Exalted technically fall outside of the two categories, though their power level is comparable to that of Celestial Exalted. Liminal Exalted and Exigents also fall out outside of these categories and are normally on par with Terrestrial Exalted, although some Exigents can manifest power comparable to the Celestial Exalted. A brief synopsis of each type is given here, organized by how these Exalts are often arranged in texts for much of the line's history, followed by Exalts who appeared in later texts in order of appearance.

Most types of Exalted have certain collective predispositions toward or against other Exalt types by culture, and may be viewed differently by the various mortals of Creation. Centuries of Terrestrial hegemony and propaganda play a part in this: the Dragon-Blooded and their world-spanning empire are often seen as demigods and heroes, for instance, while the Lunar Exalted are typically seen as monstrous and dangerous.

==== Solar Exalted (Chosen of the Unconquered Sun) ====
The default protagonists of Exalted and the champions of the chief of the gods, a being known as the Unconquered Sun. There are five castes of Solar Exalted, Dawn (warriors and generals), Zenith (priest-kings of the Unconquered Sun), Twilight (scholars and sorcerers), Night (spies and assassins) and Eclipse (ambassadors and diplomats).

Solars are regarded as monstrous demons by much of the mortal world due to centuries of propaganda by the Realm.

The nature of Solar Charms tends to express itself instead through human excellence taken to superhuman extremes, and as such their raw prowess in most skills easily exceeds any of the others.

==== Lunar Exalted (Chosen of Luna) ====
Presented as the most anarchistic and chaotic of the Exalted. In the sourcebooks, they are often referred to as cunning shapeshifters, skilled fighters, and capable generals.

Within the game's history, they were very tightly bound to the First Age Solars. While many stood and died beside their Solar friends and spouses in the Usurpation, others fled to the edges of Creation and remade themselves to fight a long war against the Dragon-Blooded. Lunars now follow at best a loose tribal hierarchy and often ritually tattoo each other to protect themselves from the warping effects of the Wyld.

The second edition detailed the Lunar Exalted's subversive influence on Creation's societies and revealed the Thousand Streams River Project, a complicated system of social engineering designed to create self-sufficient human societies that do not require Exalted leadership to function. Several major societies within the game were declared the results of centuries of subtle, behind-the-scenes guidance, with varying degrees of success.

The third edition again changed the Lunar Exalted. Lunars were not inherently linked to Solar Exalted and instead early in the First Age the two groups went to war to settle who would have greater hegemony in Creation. The conflict was ended with negotiated peace and mutual cooperation instead, sealed with ritualized marriages that linked most Solar and Lunar Exalted together into supernatural bonds. When the First Age ended, the Lunars turned their attention to the Terrestrial Shogunate by fighting a long term insurgency against the Dragon-Blooded and Sidereal hegemony. Their castes were reforged by the Lunars themselves to better reflect the needs of the world they now found themselves in. The Silver Pact exists as a support network of Lunars seeking to destroy the successor-states of the Shogunate and protect Lunars from reprisal of the Wyld Hunt and other Lunar enemies.

==== Sidereal Exalted (Chosen of the Five Maidens) ====
These Celestial Exalted are few, yet are described as major players in the fate of Creation. Sidereals are peerless martial artists and excel at foreseeing and manipulating fate. They are often presented as secret agents of the Bureau of Fate of the Celestial City of Yu-Shan, the home of the gods, directing events in the mortal world from behind the scenes.

They were the viziers, prophets and cunning advisers of the First Age. Toward the end of the First Age, a prophecy came to them which warned that without action, Creation would fall to darkness. Seeking to save the world, the Sidereals looked into the future and saw two options: attempt to reform of their maddening kings, or destroy the Solar Exalted and raise up the Dragon-Blooded in their place. The Sidereals, possibly under the effects of the Great Curse laid upon them by the Neverborn, elected the path that offered a guaranteed future for Creation. As such, they orchestrated the end of the First Age, known as the Great Usurpation.

Sidereals slip from the minds of those who meet them, mortal and Exalt alike, which can be beneficial to Sidereal characters or harmful, depending on their intended goals as player characters and non-player characters. Some unpredicted events prior to the "present" setting of Exalted, such as the Great Contagion, have jarred their faith in their precognitive abilities. Meanwhile, the loss of the Scarlet Empress, their secret ally at the top of the Scarlet Dynasty, has greatly weakened their influence.

In the present, a growing rift between the Bronze Faction (which supports the Dragon-Blooded hegemony) and the Gold Faction (which backs the newly returned Solars) renders the Sidereal Exalted uncertain of their future.

Some aspects of Sidereal Exalted have changed in the third edition. There is no longer a mention of a Great Prophecy, and instead the Sidereals who conspired to perform the Solar Purge did so under presumption it was the best option based on what information they had. In addition, the relationship between the Factions has been reframed, with the Bronze Faction being more about status quo (which the Realm and Dragon-Blooded were critical to preserving) and whose leadership are those who supported the original Solar Purge. Meanwhile, the Gold Faction is more about reformation of the world (which Solar support is a notably powerful clique within that Faction), rather than support of Solar Exalted in themselves.

==== Terrestrial Exalted (Chosen of the Elemental Dragons) ====
There are five elemental aspects to the Dragon-Blooded: Air, Earth, Fire, Water, and Wood. In the history of Exalted, they were the elite infantry and servants to the rest of the Exalted in the First Age. This is reframed in 3e to be more the officers and champions of the armies comprising most of humanity during the Divine Revolution, and later allies to the Celestial Exalted and local nobility throughout the First Age. They are less powerful than other types of Exalted, but most of their strength lies in their inheritance – rather than being chosen by a god, the Dragon-Blooded have the potential to share their Exaltation through their bloodline. With their comparatively massive numbers, along with the help and guidance of the Sidereal Exalted, they were able to overthrow the Solar Exalted at the height of their power and end the First Age.

The most prevalent Dragon-Blooded in Creation make up the ruling class of the Realm, that is the strongest empire in Creation. The state-sanctioned faith known as the Immaculate Order paints the Solar and Lunar Exalted as dangerous Anathema who will bring ruin to the world if allowed to exist. Because of this, the Realm organizes the Wyld Hunt, which actively seeks out dangers to the Realm (such "Anathema" include many other types of Exalted, rogue gods, and the Fair Folk) and destroys them. This practice effectively kept the Solars from rising to power again since the end of the First Age, but has faltered with the recent disappearance of the Scarlet Empress and the subsequent power struggle among the Great Houses.

The ruling Dragon-Blooded of the Realm are made up of the eleven Great Houses. Most houses were founded by and named after one of the Scarlet Empress's Exalted offspring, though at least two are descended from the Empress's late husbands and consorts, and a few are named after people the Empress legally adopted as her children.

==== Abyssal Exalted (Chosen of the Void) ====
Loyal servants of the Deathlords, the Abyssal castes are a dark reflection of their Solar counterparts; Dusk (soldiers, generals, and martial champions), Midnight (priests and leaders), Daybreak (scholars and artisans), Day (assassins and spies), and Moonshadow (bureaucrats and diplomats).

In the present of Exalted, the Neverborn sow their revenge from beyond the grave through their Deathlord servants. The source materials, primarily the second edition sourcebook The Manual of Exalted Power: Abyssals, present the Deathlords as the vengeful ghosts of First Age Solars slaughtered in the Usurpation. They have varied goals, but most strive not to conquer or corrupt Creation, save as a path to the Neverborn's desire: the complete destruction of existence.

The greatest agents of the Deathlords in the world of the living are the Abyssal Exalted, also known as Deathknights: dark reflections of the Solar Exalted. They field vast undead armies, bolstered by ancient knowledge long since lost to the living, but still readily available among the lingering dead, and a powerful form of magic known as necromancy. Several sourcebooks present the Abyssals and the Deathlords as having a tentative foothold in Creation, representing a grave threat.

==== Alchemical Exalted (Chosen of Autochthon) ====
Creations made from clay and magical materials, built in the world of Autochthonia. They were introduced in the supplement Time of Tumult. Alchemicals serve the Great Maker Autochthon, a Primordial who assisted the gods by sharing the secret of Exaltation with them. The Champions are infused with the souls of dead Autochthonian heroes, serving as protectors of a parallel world made up of the body of Autochthon himself, and enforce the will of its theocratic government. They divide themselves into six castes according to which material was predominantly used in their construction. Instead of wielding Essence directly and using their Charms in a magical fashion the way other Exalted do, the Alchemicals have Charms installed like peripheral parts. As Alchemical Exalted grow in power, they also increase in size, eventually physically joining with Autochthon and forming living, sapient cities.

In the first and second edition, the Alchemicals are not subject to the Great Curse, as they did not fight in the Primordial War. In gameplay, in place of curse-driven insanity, they have a Clarity track which measures their psychological distance from humanity. Those Alchemicals who have been infected with Autochthon's illness have a Dissonance track instead, measuring their madness, corruption, and drive to violate boundaries, becoming apostates.

In the third edition, Autochthon created the Alchemical Exalted originally to help show the gods the potential of the process and his own commitment to aiding them in their cause. As a result, some Alchemicals remained in Creation in a dormant state or may have been made through rare confluence of events. Resonance still exists in the third edition, but is reframed as the manifestation of the Great Curse in the Alchemical Exalted, with Exaltation itself being what's cursed. Apostasy is still possible, but is not presented as a player-facing option in the third edition.

==== Infernal Exalted (Chosen of the Yozis) ====
The Yozis are the Primordials who were overthrown, but did not die. They created the Infernal Exalted from fifty stolen Essences of Solar Exalts. Their rules apeeared in the second edition's Manual of Exalted Power - The Infernals (April 2009).

The Infernals, also known as Green Sun Princes, have the full resources of the demon realm at their disposal, along with numerous Yozi cults which already exist in creation, and learn the transformative Charms of the Yozis themselves. It is implied that despite currently reveling in their power, the vast majority of Infernal Exalted will grow disillusioned with the alien Yozis and ultimately go rogue. The Infernals' Primordial power gives them the potential to grow into new Titans themselves, not bound by the same shortness of vision their current patrons possess.

In the first and second edition, Exalts could make pacts with the Yozis, typically facilitated through the acquiring of forbidden text known as the Broken-Winged Crane. These were known as Akuma. They often gained notable power for their pledges to Hell, namely in Merits, additional access to magical power, and Yozi Charms in the case of the second edition. In exchange, their free will was destroyed, and they became slaves to the Yozis.

The presentation of Infernal Exalted was changed in the third edition, first in Exalted: Essence and then Crucible of Legend. While remaining Chosen of the Yozis, they do not use Yozi Charms, instead drawing heavily on them for their themes and inspiration. They are chosen from individuals who see themselves as wronged or oppressed in some fashion, justifiably or not. With the Yozis forever trapped in Hell, they hope that by corrupting the Chosen of the gods to their power, they can inflict revenge on a Creation that has rejected them. Their castes are named for the positions of celestial bodies and roughly correspond to the Solar Castes, though focused on how the Exalt was put down by the world: Azimuth from victims of violence and war, Ascendants by those considered expendable or impure, Horizons from those denied knowledge, Nadirs from those subject to imprisonment either literally or metaphorically, and Penumbra by those subjected to the caprice of those in power.

Akuma are not present in the third edition.

==== Liminal Exalted (Chosen of the Dark Mother) ====
Liminal Exalted first appeared in the second edition Masters of Jade and were not fully detailed. They became more defined in the third edition rules and have since appeared throughout the line, with their own full sourcebook forthcoming. They are first presented as playable in Exalted: Essence (June 2023).

The Liminals "stand at the border between life and death, humanity and monstrosity". They are created when someone attempts to bring another person back from death; resurrection is explicitly impossible in Exalted, but some will still try. On occasion, this attempt draws the attention of some other power that raises the corpse to life again. The new Liminal possesses the memories of the body that she wears, but does not possess the same soul, and thus does not have the same personality. Like the Dragon-Blooded, they are divided among five aspects—Breath, Blood, Flesh, Marrow, and Soil—depending on the motives of the person who created them.

==== Exigents (Chosen of the Little Gods) ====
Exigents were introduced in the third edition rulebook, and are detailed in full in Exigents: Out of the Ashes (May 2024), and includes their creation, as well as four ready-to-play characters, the Strawmaiden, the Puppeteer, Architects, and the Sovereigns of Uluiru.

Exigents are the Chosen of the Little Gods, which is any god lesser than the Incarna. The secret of Exaltation is not known to gods normally, and the price needed to Exalt is taxing enough that it is unlikely many gods could do it. A deity in great need can petition to the Unconquered Sun to grant them a portion of the Flame of Exigence — a wonder obtained by him and the other Incarna in the early days of the Divine Revolution — which acts as a catalyst allowing a god to create a Chosen. It still diminishes the god in some fashion, and many weaker deities are destroyed by the process.

Exigents themselves are often singular, unique Exaltations that do not persist after the Chosen dies, though this can vary. Some are inherited like Celestial Exalted. Others have an artifact or familiar of some sort which is inherited by each Exaltation. Others are Exalted by a source which has some means to Exalt more Chosen of that particular sort. The Flame of Exigence can also be traded or stolen, resulting in illicit Exigents not fitting the purpose of the original divine petition. Multiple gods sometimes participate in the creation of an Exaltation with the Exigence, which can result in patchwork Exalts with conflicting and often strained natures as a result.

Most Exigents are on par with the Terrestrial Exalted, but a few stand on par with Celestial Exalts, though the god who Chooses does not impact this. The Strawmaiden Janest is on par with Celestial Exalted despite being Chosen of a field god, while Sovereigns remain Terrestrial despite the source of their Exaltation incorporating the blood of the dead Incarna of the Aurora.

Exigents serve as a way to introduce unique, custom Exalts that do not fit within one of the established categories of Exalted. It also draws on the unique themes of particular gods of the setting that would not be reflective of the way the other Exalted might, but do not justify the setting needs of introducing a whole new Exalt host.

==== Getimian Exalted (Chosen from Discarded Destinies) ====
Getimian Exalted are introduced in the third edition, and appear in The Realm. They appear as a playable type in Exalted: Essence, (June 2023), and are further detailed in Crucible of Legends.

These Exalted are heroes whose destinies could have changed the world, but instead were never born as Heaven discarded those destinies in favor of another path. Originally created by the titans Oramus and Sacheverell during the Divine Revolution, they were deemed too costly to use and hidden away. The rogue Sidereal Exalt Rakan Thulio rediscovered their Exaltations, and brought them into the world again to serve in his War Against Heaven.

Getimians find themselves appearing in Creation having never existed before, remembering a different Creation where they were notable heroes, called their Origin. The Getimian Origin is explicitly not an alternative universe that existed, but only one which could have been. The Getimian did not exist until the moment they Exalt, and their memories are of a world that simply never was. Current writers have often used the film It's a Wonderful Life as an example of the Getimian condition. Their four Castes are named for the four seasons and draw on what the notable way the Getimian impacted their world as a mortal: Springs brought beauty, Summers brought conquest, Autumns brought sacrifice, and Winters brought order.

The Getimian Exalted have Essence split into two pools: Still and Flowing, and unlike the other Exalted types, their Charms interact with their separate pools in different ways: Some of their Charms can only be powered by one or the other, or cause different effects depending on which one is used. Their magic frequently involves forms of spatial manipulation, internal and external alchemy, and bringing into reality aspects of their Origin.

=== Other magical beings ===
Alongside the various types of Exalts found in Creation, there are also other magical creatures that use the same Essence which Exalts use to power their magical effects. The following are the most prominent types of magical beings.

Behemoths are unique, immortal monsters, and fall into three broad categories. Primordial Behemoths were created by the Primordials in the Time of Glory before the Primordial War. Wyld Behemoths appear as monsters under the control of Fair Folk, but they are not truly separate beings from their masters, and are merely the aggressive tendencies of powerful Fair Folk come to life. Undead behemoths, called hekatonkheires in first and second edition, include Primordial behemoths killed during that Primordial War/Divine Revolution and persist in the Underworld, as well as the remnants of the souls of the Neverborn and manifestations of their nightmares.

The Dragon Kings are not Exalted, but supernatural creatures offered as a player character type. The Dragon Kings are dinosaur-like beings of great power. Dragon Kings are sworn in allegiance to their creator, the Unconquered Sun, and can remember their past lives with great clarity. Although they once ruled Creation, the majority of their perpetually-reincarnating souls were annihilated during the war against the Primordials. After the First Age ended in war and disease, what remained of their civilization collapsed. They still exist in the Second Age, though hidden in the furthest corners of Creation. Rules for playing Dragon Kings are presented in the first edition's Exalted Player's Guide, in the second edition's Scroll of the Fallen Races, and in third edition's forthcomingPillars of Creation.

The Fair Folk, like the Dragon Kings, are an alternative player character type. They know themselves by their own word, raksha. However, the superstitious in Creation, rightly fearing that to name them is to invoke them, call them the Fair Folk with the hope of flattering and placating them. In one sense, they are very similar to the Primordials: primeval beings whose existences precede and are not bound by the physical reality of Creation. They are natives of the Wyld, which they call Rakshastan; the place that exists between Creation and the Unshaped Chaos.

The Fair Folk prey upon mortal souls and do a brisk slave trade with The Guild, a powerful economic organization in Creation. The Unshaped are the most powerful of their number, but lack the means to stabilize themselves by assimilating the personhood of mortals and as such are incapable of existing in Creation for any long duration. Rules for the Fair Folk are presented in the first edition's Exalted: The Fair Folk, and in the second edition's Graceful Wicked Masques: The Fair Folk.

The God-Blooded are the offspring of a mortal or animal and a magical being, or the mortal offspring of two magical beings, in which case they take after the more powerful of the two. The resulting offspring bears traces of its mystical parentage. According to the authors, they stand somewhere between divinity and mortality: less than Exalted, but more than human. Those with awakened Essence can purchase the same types of Charms as their supernatural parent, though their power is limited by a low Permanent Essence trait and a small Essence pool.

There are several types of God-Blooded, mostly named for their supernatural parentage: God-Blooded are the children of gods and elementals, Demon-Blooded are the offspring of demons, Ghost-Blooded are the children of ghosts using charms to help them reproduce with mortals, and Half-Caste are the children of powerful Exalts (although exceedingly rare). The Fae-Blooded are the children of a union between the raksha and mortals. The Mountain Folk can also produce God-Blooded offspring, but there is no specific term for them. Rules for playing God-Blooded characters are presented in the first edition's Exalted Player's Guide, in the second edition's Scroll of Heroes.

The Mountain Folk are also known as the Jadeborn, creatures of the Great Maker Autochthon. When Creation was initially formed by the Primordials, some among the Unshaped were incorporated into the substance of the created world. Sensing that these other, native intelligences of chaos had been snuffed out in the creation of inanimate elements, Autochthon took pity on them. Salvaging whatever it could discern of their prior selves, Autochthon resurrected them, still formed of the earthen materials they had calcified into, but alive, and with at least a glimmering memory of the intelligent entities they had once been.

The Mountain Folk, like many of the Exalted, are divided into castes: artisans, warriors, and workers. Most of them are unenlightened, limited in intelligence, creativity, and supernatural power. A small minority of workers and warriors, in addition to the entire artisan caste—areeEnlightened, with much greater creativity as well as both mundane and supernatural potential. Mountain Folk society is ruled by the artisan caste, who make up the nobility, with unenlightened warriors and workers making up the commoners and enlightened warriors and workers occupying an intermediate position. Rules for playing the Mountain Folk appear in first edition's Exalted: The Fair Folk and second edition's Scroll of the Fallen Races.

Spirits are divided into demons, elementals, ghosts, and gods. With the exception of elementals, spirits are naturally immaterial, generally require charms to materialize in Creation, and will reform when killed unless some supernatural effect prevents them from doing so. Rules for playing ghosts appear in the first edition's Exalted: The Abyssals, and the second edition's The Books of Sorcery, Vol. V: The Roll of Glorious Divinity II: Ghosts & Demons. Rules for playing elementals and gods are presented in The Books of Sorcery, Vol. IV: The Roll of Glorious Divinity I: Gods & Elementals.

Yozis (or demons) are exiled, imprisoned and twisted Primordials. As the makers of the world and the gods, they are at once grandiose beings and complex pantheons: Each Primordial has multiple souls, which are independent sapient beings in their own right and possess sapient spiritual fragments. These souls, and the entities which they craft, birth, or otherwise create, are the demons of Exalted. Due to the terms of the Yozis' surrender, all demons can be summoned and bound by a powerful enough sorcerer.

Elementals maintain Creation, and with a few exceptions, embody one of the five elements in Exalted, air, earth, fire, water and wood. They are naturally material, requiring charms to dematerialize, and with a few exceptions, cannot reform when slain. Unlike other spirits, their growth is largely unrestricted. The most powerful elementals are the lesser and greater elemental dragons. Elementals are generally outranked by gods of similar power. While sorcerers can summon and bind demons through sorcery, the elementals conjured via a similar spell are brought into being whole-cloth, and frequently cease to exist at the end of their binding.

In the first and second editions, Autochthonia had its own elements and related elementals which embody one of the machine world's elements: crystal, metal, oil, lightning ans steam, and cannot be summoned through sorcery. In the third edition, Autochthon used incorporated Creation's elements in the design of his world. These elementals can be created by sorcery like those found in Creation, but will normally reflect the aesthetics and themes of Autocthonia.

The most common type of ghosts, referred to as ghosts or the dead, are the hun or higher souls of mortals who have refused to pass into Lethe and reincarnation due to their attachment to their mortal lives. These ghosts are much weaker than Exalted, and they can only respire Essence in the Underworld and Shadowlands. Hungry ghosts generally come into existence due to betrayal, vengeance or a traumatic death. A hungry ghost initially includes both the higher soul and the po, or lower soul, but the hun soon moves on, leaving the hungry ghost largely mindless. Unlike other ghosts, hungry ghosts are naturally material in Creation at night. Nephwracks are ghosts who have been corrupted by the Neverborn. Unlike uncorrupted ghosts, they are capable of using necromancy. The Deathlords are thirteen ghosts of powerful Solar Exalted who have been empowered by the Neverborn, and although they are not technically Exalted, they have access to Abyssal Charms. Spectres, also known as plasmics, are bizarre creatures spawned by the nightmares of the Neverborn. The category of Hekatonkhire includes the ghosts of demons, devas and Primordial behemoths, as well as the manifested nightmares of the Neverborn. The Neverborn are the ghosts of slain Primordials. Immensely powerful, they are difficult to rouse from their slumber, and their power seems largely constrained to the Labyrinth. Mundane ghosts and Hekatonkhire can be summoned through necromancy, while only mundane ghosts can be summoned through sorcery.

Most gods are members of the Celestial Order, which is stratified into two divisions: the Celestial Court, composed of gods of concepts, and the Terrestrial Bureaucracy, made up of the gods of physical objects and locations. All members of the Celestial Court technically outrank each member of the Terrestrial Bureaucracy. In practice, Terrestrial courts are mostly independent.

Outside of the Celestial Order, there are also the unemployed gods whose domains have been usurped or destroyed, rogue gods who have abandoned their duties, and forbidden gods who have been exiled due to madness, an abhorrent nature or because they sided with the Primordials.

Outside of the above categories exist various other sorts of spirits, some of which defy classification. These include the souls of the free Primordials Gaia and Autocthon (the latter of which manifest as the various machine spirits within Autocthonia), as well as the animal avatar champions uplifted by Gaia, and the pattern spiders that operate the Loom of Fate.

=== Essence ===
Essence is the mystical force which the Exalted and gods manipulate to gain their supernatural powers, as well as the energy that forms all things. Within the game, the mystical force "Essence" is always capitalized to distinguish it from other uses of the word.

=== Magical Materials ===
The Magical Materials are used to forge artifacts and weapons. Each material is associated with a type of Exalted, as well as one of the Castes of Alchemical Exalted, who are partially constructed from that material. These materials are all easily enchanted, and each one resonates with a particular type of Exalted. This resonance makes any item which is both constructed from one of the Magical Materials and attuned to an Exalt's anima preternaturally deft and sure in that Exalt's hands. It also gives the Exalt access to the powers of any hearthstone mounted on the item. The third edition expands on this with the concept of Evocations, charms tied to a given artifact based on its material construction, legend, and Exalted resonance. Some Evocations gain additional affects when the Exalt wielding them are of the Resonant material, while the Evocation may not work at its full effect if the Exalt is Dissonant with that material.

Jade is the most common magical material and is associated with the Dragon-Blooded Exalted. There are five colors of jade which correspond to each of the five elements of creation: blue, for air; white, for earth; red, for fire; black, for water; and green, for wood.

Starmetal is the rarest magical material, forged from meteors. In the first edition, these meteors were a result of the execution of gods in Heaven. It was not retained in the second edition core rulebook, but was later reintroduced in Oadenol's Codex. The third edition describes starmetal as the result of concentrated essence from the sky and constellations. Like its wielders, the Sidereal Exalted, starmetal reweaves fate and involves itself with divine functions.

Moonsilver is considered by the Lunar Exalted to be a gift from their patron, Luna. It must be harvested by moonlight, using no crafted tools, forged at night and cooled only with water that has never seen the sun. Like the protean Lunars, moonsilver can shift into new forms easily.

Soulsteel is made from human souls and the substance of the Labyrinth of the Underworld. It is jet black, and agonized faces of the souls it contains can be seen moving and screaming in the metal. This metal is used almost exclusively by the Abyssal Exalted. Soulsteel weapons draw upon the forces of death and the underworld.

Orichalcum is a magical form of gold used primarily by the Solar Exalted, though it has associations with the Dragon Kings and in the third edition the Infernal Exalted as well. Orichalcum is rarely found in pure deposits. It is normally created out of gold that has been heated by lava and sunlight reflected from mirrors of occult design.

Adamant is a form of magical diamond, and is super-solid crystal that is refined down to the sharpest substance known. It is largely present within the body of the Primordial Autochthon, but was also known in Creation during the First Age. This material is used primarily by the Alchemical Exalted, though the Exalted of the First Age occasionally made items out of the material.

== Books ==
See the list of Exalted sourcebooks for further information.

== Reviews ==
- Pyramid
- Black Gate #4
- Backstab #33
- Coleção Dragão Brasil
- Realms of Fantasy

== See also ==
- Storytelling System
