= Robert Hatch (game designer) =

American writer and game designer

- Occupation: Game designer
- Known for: Trinity, Aberrant and Exalted RPGs

Robert Hatch is a game designer and writer who developed key role-playing game releases for White Wolf Publishing from 1993 to 2001. He is known primarily for three games he co-created: the science fiction game Trinity, the super-hero game Aberrant (1999), and the epic fantasy RPG Exalted (2001).

== Career ==
Hatch began his career with White Wolf writing "splatbooks" such as The Book of Chantries (1993) for Mage: The Ascension and Clanbook Nosferatu (1994) for Vampire: The Masquerade. He was also a co-author of the well-received second edition of Werewolf: The Apocalypse (1994) and of the boundary-pushing Charnel Houses of Europe: The Shoah (1997) for Wraith: the Oblivion. Hatch came to prominence with his major contribution to Kindred of the East (1998), a "flatsplat" (handsome hardcover supplement) pioneering the thematic annual releases White Wolf would continue over the next few years.

After collaborating in the creation of White Wolf's first science fiction RPG, Trinity, Hatch developed the near-future superhero role-playing game Aberrant, which he molded into part of the "Trinity Universe" setting and published in 1999 as the next game in the Trinity universe. After contributing to Mummy: The Resurrection he began working on a completely new design with Justin Achilli and Steve Wieck which became Exalted (2001). Further development of this acclaimed fantasy RPG was then continued by Geoff Grabowski as line developer. In his final work for White Wolf, Hatch contributed to the Scarred Lands d20 setting under his pseudonym "Trevor Chase".
