= Mummy: The Curse =

Tabletop role-playing game

- First edition cover
- Designers: CA Suleiman
- Publishers: Onyx Path Publishing
- Publication: March 27, 2013 (ed. 1); September 15, 2021 (ed. 2)
- Genres: Modern gothic
- Systems: Storytelling System
- Series: Chronicles of Darkness
- Website: Official website

Mummy: The Curse is a tabletop role-playing game in the Chronicles of Darkness series, created by C.A. Suleiman and published by Onyx Path Publishing on March 27, 2013, and released in a second edition developed by Matthew Dawkins, on September 15, 2021.

== Overview ==
Mummy: The Curse is a tabletop role-playing game using the Storytelling System. Players take the roles of mummies, the ancient servants of sorcerers who were the rulers of the mythical empire of Irem. The mummies have magically been given eternal life, and alternate between awake periods and long periods of hibernation throughout the millennia, gradually forgetting who they are; the gamemaster, who leads the game, determines significant events that have shaped the player characters' pasts, which is kept secret from the players.

When creating a character, players determine what guild they will belong to, along with other attributes, which influence the characters' worldviews and abilities. To use characters' powers, they need occult energy, which can be found in relics from the Irem Empire, which have been scattered around the world since Irem's fall.

== Production ==
Mummy: The Curse was originally released in March 2013 by Onyx Path Publishing, both digitally and as a hardcover book, as the first new game in the Chronicles of Darkness series since Geist: The Sin-Eaters in 2009. Production of the game was financed through a crowdfunding campaign on the website Kickstarter, which had a goal of US$30,000, and in the end raised over $104,000. A second edition with updates to the rules, also by Onyx Path Publishing, developed by Matthew Dawkins, and financed through crowdfunding, was released on September 15, 2021. Whereas the first edition requires the World of Darkness core book to be played, the second edition has a stand-alone rulebook.

=== Books ===
Mummy: The Curse game books
Title	Original release	Publisher	Notes
Mummy: The Curse	March 27, 2013	Onyx Path Publishing	Core rulebook for the game's first edition
Guildhalls of the Deathless	September 2013	Onyx Path Publishing	Sourcebook for the five mummy guilds
Mummy: The Curse: Ready Made Characters	October 18, 2013	Onyx Path Publishing	Sourcebook containing playable characters and story hooks
Cursed Necropolis: D.C.	April 2014	Onyx Path Publishing	Sourcebook for Washington, D.C. as it is portrayed in the setting
Book of the Deceived	November 2014	Onyx Path Publishing	Sourcebook for a sixth guild believed to no longer exist
Lore of the Deceived	February 25, 2015	Onyx Path Publishing	Follow-up and companion to Book of the Deceived. Released for free.
Sothis Ascends	April 2015	Onyx Path Publishing	Sourcebook for the first three periods of mass awakenings of mummies in the Sothis cycle
Dreams of Avarice	March 2, 2016	Onyx Path Publishing	Manifesto written by the Arisen character the Heretic
Cursed Necropolis: Rio	February 2017	Onyx Path Publishing	Sourcebook for Rio de Janeiro as it is portrayed in the setting
Mummy: The Curse Second Edition	September 15, 2021	Onyx Path Publishing	Core rulebook for the game's second edition
The Book of Lasting Death	November 2, 2022	Onyx Path Publishing	Guide to the game for players
