= John Chambers (role-playing writer) =

Game designer

- Occupation: Game designer

John Chambers is a game designer who has worked primarily on role-playing games.

== Career ==
John Chambers was the line editor for Exalted who contributed the plan for the second edition of the game line through 2009.

Chambers edited the manual for the 2000 video game Vampire: The Masquerade – Redemption.

== Credits ==
=== Editor ===
- Aberrant: Church of Michael Archangel (2000)
- Caste Book: Zenith (2002)
- Creature Collection (2000)
- The Dragon-Blooded (2002)
- Time of Tumult (2002)

=== Author ===
- Mage: The Ascension (revised edition, 2000)
- Dead Magic II: Secrets and Survivors (2003)
- Orpheus (2003)
