= Justin Achilli =

American game designer and writer

Justin Achilli is an American game designer and author. He is best known for his work for White Wolf, Inc.

== Career ==
Justin Achilli began working at White Wolf in 1995. Achilli has contributed as an author for numerous Vampire: The Masquerade and Vampire: The Requiem titles, and acted as the developer for the launch of Vampire: The Requiem. Achilli has also contributed to Werewolf, Mage, Promethean, Changeling, Ravenloft, and other titles. He was promoted to Editing & Development Manager at White Wolf in 2005.

He has worked on over 100 Vampire titles.

Achilli co-designed the Exalted role-playing game with Steve Wieck and Robert Hatch, and the game was published in 2001; author Shannon Appelcline noted that the game "was both well-received and commercially successful", unlike many of the later games from White Wolf.

Achilli was one of the guests at Project A-Kon in 2006.
