= Video game director =

Video game director may refer to:

- Art director, a blanket title for a variety of similar job functions
- Creative director, a position often found within creative organizations
- Sound director, the head of the sound department
- Technical director, usually a senior technical person within creative group
- Video game designer, a person who designs gameplay
- Video game developer, a software developer that creates video games
- Video game producer, the person in charge of overseeing development of a video game
- Video game programmer, a person who primarily develops codebase for video games or related software
