= Onyx Path Publishing =

Role-playing game company

- Industry: Role-playing games
- Founded: 2011
- Website: theonyxpath.com

Onyx Path Publishing is a publisher of tabletop role-playing games that produces company-owned and creator-owned games as well as licensed products.

== History ==
The name "The Onyx Path" and the company's logo appeared on White Wolf products and their message board in early 2012. There was some speculation about their meaning before the company went public with their plans during GenCon in August 2012.

The company was founded in January 2012 by White Wolf Creative Director Richard Thomas, and is licensee for Paradox Interactive's World of Darkness, Chronicles of Darkness, and Exalted. The company also bought the Trinity Universe and Scion gamelines from White Wolf/CCP Games. As such, Onyx Path Publishing released the titles that were previously announced by White Wolf for the 2012/2013 schedule.

Onyx Path make books available through DriveThruRPG electronically (as PDF files) and physically via DriveThruRPG's print on demand service, with selected products available via traditional print in game and book stores. In addition, Onyx Path Publishing has used the crowd funding service Kickstarter to raise money for deluxe editions of some of their new products.

The homepage of Onyx Path Publishing provides guidelines to send in material, in case one would want to have their own game published by them. They also provide contact links on their website for people who wish to submit writing, editing, and art samples, and get hired to work for Onyx Path.

== Game Lines ==
Onyx Path Publishing have since their founding published a wide variety of tabletop role-playing games and card games, some owned by themselves, others under license to the listed third parties.

=== Onyx Path Publishing ===
==== Curseborne ====
Following a teaser advertising campaign via YouTube, Twitch, and TikTok, Onyx Path announced the urban horror/fantasy roleplaying game Curseborne at Onyx Path Con 2024. The game promises the ability to play as Hungry (vampire protagonists), Primal (shapeshifters), Sorcerers, the Dead (phantoms that can possess people), and Outcasts (demons banished from their home realm). Each playable Lineage is divided into multiple families with different themes of play. The game has been heavily featured on the Onyx Path website blog and in videos from several YouTube RPG creators. Crowdfunding was completed in October 2024, with the core rulebook released on DriveThruRPG on November 19th 2025.

==== Scarred Lands ====
The Scarred Lands setting received an update for 5th edition Dungeons & Dragons and Pathfinder with Onyx Path's Scarred Land's Player's Guide, Creature Collection, and Dead Man's Rust mega campaign, and is supported via the Slarecian Vault community content hosted by DriveThruRPG. The Scarred Lands setting puts players in the roles of characters in the world of Scarn, recently following an epic war between gods and titans leaving the world damaged magically and environmentally as a result of the divine conflict.

==== Scion ====
Onyx Path published a 2nd edition of the Scion roleplaying game, in which players take on the roles of gods' children from across multiple global pantheons, such as the Theoi, Aesir, and Kami. The game takes characters from Origin level, where they start as blessed but mostly mundane humans, through to Hero, Demigod, and God levels of power. Onyx Path have taken Scion away from its traditional material with ventures into playing the children of Lovecraftian Great Old Ones in Masks of the Mythos, and dragons in Scion: Dragon. Scion is supported by the Storypath Nexus community content program.

==== They Came From...! ====
The They Came From...! series of cinematic roleplaying games are each based on different media genres, parodying cult classics via tabletop roleplay. Players take on the roles of characters in cult favorite movies such as Plan 9 from Outer Space and Manos: The Hands of Fate, and can use cinema logic to have their protagonists break through cheap sets, insert missing reels to escape impending danger, and use deleted scenes to justify the presence of unlikely items. They Came From...! has so far produced the 1950s sci-fi influenced They Came from Beneath the Sea!, the 1960s and 1970s horror influenced They Came from Beyond the Grave!, the espionage genre influenced They Came from [CLASSIFIED]!, the fantasy feature influenced They Came from the Cyclops's Cave!, and the slasher movie influenced They Came from Camp Murder Lake!. They Came From...! is supported by the Storypath Nexus community content program.

==== Trinity Continuum ====
The Trinity Continuum games take place at different points in the past, present, and future, and place the protagonists as Talents, Psiads, Novas, Daredevils, and Aethernauts. In these roles, they fight against conspiracies, alien invasions, and supervillains (among other threats) across a slew of genres as the characters demonstrate superheroic abilities and must weigh the benefits of developing power with the responsibility of wielding it. The Trinity Continuum Core was followed by Trinity Continuum: Aberrant, in which the protagonists are mutated superheroes in the near future; Trinity Continuum: Aeon, in which the protagonists exist in a far future sci-fi era of psychics and aliens; Trinity Continuum: Assassins, in which the protagonists are trained killers; Trinity Continuum: Adventure!, in which the protagonists take on the pulp heroic roles of the 1930s; Trinity Continuum: Anima, in which protagonists live in an oppressive cyberpunk city while finding escape in a realistic MMO accessed via neural implants; and Trinity Continuum: Aether, in which the protagonists bend the laws of reality in a Victorian age where all the characters and events of 19th century fiction are real. The Trinity Continuum is supported by the Storypath Nexus community content program.

===== The World Below =====
The World Below TTRPG was announced in 2021 and crowdfunded in November 2023. It is described as a fantasy roleplaying game in which the protagonists are descendants of people who survived a great cataclysm on their world's surface, and are forced to survive, explore, and build lives in their new subterranean homes. The game's creator, Matthew Dawkins, cited influences such as J.G. Ballard, The Platform, and Hollow Knight.

=== Paradox Interactive ===
==== World of Darkness ====
Onyx Path are one of the licensees for Paradox Interactive's World of Darkness game, once owned by White Wolf/CCP. Onyx Path produced seven books (Chicago by Night, Let the Streets Run Red, The Chicago Folios, Cults of the Blood Gods, Trails of Ash and Bones, Forbidden Religions, and Children of the Blood) for Vampire: The Masquerade 5th Edition before they were repackaged as games by industry peer, Renegade Games, and otherwise focus on creating content for Mage: The Ascension 20th Anniversary Edition and Werewolf: The Apocalypse 20th Anniversary Edition.

==== Chronicles of Darkness ====
Onyx Path are the sole licensee for Paradox Interactive's Chronicles of Darkness game, once owned by White Wolf/CCP. Onyx Path have released 2nd editions of Vampire: The Requiem, Werewolf: The Forsaken, Mage: The Awakening, Promethean: The Created, Changeling: The Lost, Geist: The Sin-Eaters, Hunter: The Vigil, and Mummy: The Curse, as well as the games Beast: The Primordial, Demon: The Descent, and Deviant: The Renegades, along with sourcebooks for each game line.

==== Exalted ====
The epic fantasy roleplaying game of Exalted, in which players take on the role of Solar champions with devastating powers, has received a 3rd edition from Onyx Path, along with additional player character options in the form of Dragon-Blooded: What Fire Has Wrought, Lunars: Fangs at the Gate, Sidereals: Charting Fate's Course, and the upcoming Abyssals.

=== Rose Bailey ===
==== Cavaliers of Mars ====
Game designer Rose Bailey worked alongside Onyx Path to create her RPG about playing in a romantic Mars of flashing sword, choking sands, winking courtesans, and lantern-lit canal cities. Cavaliers of Mars has gone on to spawn sourcebooks such as the location and adventure book, Witch-Queen of the Shadowed Citadel, and Esoterica of Mars, covering characters plots, factions, and new rules for the game.

=== Michael Pucci ===
==== Dystopia Rising: Evolution ====
Michael Pucci licensed his game of zombies, apocalypse, mutation, and survivalist mentality to Onyx Path to produce as a tabletop roleplaying game following many years as a Live Action Roleplaying Game (LARP). Dystopia Rising: Evolution was funded through Kickstarter, and has subsequently been made available through DriveThruRPG and in traditional print, along with sourcebooks including Helnau's Guide to Wasteland Beasties and the Trouble on Steel Pier adventure.

=== Caliber Comics ===
==== Legendlore ====
The Legendlore comic by Caliber Comics led to a collaboration between Caliber and Onyx Path and their publication of the Legendlore role-playing game, using the system from 5th edition Dungeons & Dragons to convert the plots and principles of The Realm - as presented in the comic - into game form. Megan Mackie is a contributing writer.

=== Pugsteady ===
==== Realms of Pugmire ====
Game designer Eddy Webb and his company, Pugsteady collaborated with Onyx Path to create the tabletop role-playing games, Pugmire, Monarchies of Mau, and Squeaks in the Deep, in which you play anthropomorphized animals (primarily dogs, cats, rats, and mice) in a far future setting where humans have disappeared and the uplifted animal protagonists are tasked with exploring the mysteries of their unusual world. A 2nd edition of Pugmire, named Realms of Pugmire, was funded on Kickstarter in 2023.
