= Steve Wieck =

American game designer and publisher

- Other name: Stephan Wieck
- Occupations: Game designer; CEO
- Notable work: Mage: The Ascension
- Relatives: Stewart Wieck (brother)

Steve Wieck (also credited as Stephan Wieck) is best known as one of the founders of the publishing company White Wolf, Inc. He is also one of the original writers of Mage: The Ascension. Wieck is a co-founder of DriveThruRPG which later merged with RPGNow to become Wolves of Freeport. Wieck is currently the CEO of Wolves of Freeport.

== Career ==
=== White Wolf ===
Steve Wieck and his brother Stewart Wieck had their first published work in 1986 as the adventure The Secret in the Swamp for Villains & Vigilantes from FGU. Later that same year, while they were still in high school, the brothers began self-publishing their own magazine, Arcanum; Stewart soon retitled the magazine as White Wolf, publishing the first issue in August 1986. The Wiecks were fans of Elric, and named their magazine after him. Stephan Wieck wrote the Shadowrun adventure Queen Euphoria (1990). The Wiecks had befriended the company Lion Rampant, and when that company encountered financial trouble, White Wolf and Lion Rampant decided to merge into the new White Wolf Game Studio, with Stewart Wieck and Mark Rein-Hagen as co-owners.

Wieck graduated from the Georgia Institute of Technology in 1991 and left White Wolf to start MBA-equivalent training at General Electric. Wieck returned from GE after completing two years of training in business, and Stewart made Wieck the CEO of White Wolf in 1993. The company encountered economic problems in 1995–1996, which resulted in a falling out between Rein-Hagen and the Wiecks, and Rein-Hagen leaving White Wolf. Wieck co-designed the Exalted role-playing game with Robert Hatch and Justin Achilli, and the game was published in 2001. Wieck left his role as President of White Wolf in 2002, and Mike Tinney became the new president.

==== CCP Games ====
In November 2006, it was announced that CCP Games had entered a merger agreement with White Wolf Publishing. Wieck left White Wolf in 2007 for a seat on the board of directors at CCP. He served on CCP's board of directors for 9 years.

=== DriveThruRPG and OneBookShelf ===
In 2004, Mike Todd, Chris McDonough, and Wieck created DriveThruRPG, an online RPG PDF distributor. In 2006, DriveThruRPG merged with RPGNow, another online RPG distributor. The merger formed OneBookShelf. As of July 2022, Wieck remains the CEO of OneBookShelf.

In July 2022, Roll20 and OneBookShelf announced a merger between the two companies. This merger combined the content libraries of both companies. Ankit Lai, CEO of Roll20, become the new company's CEO and Wieck become president of the new company and joined Roll20's board of directors. In 2023, the company's name became Wolves of Freeport, which is a reference to Wieck's EverQuest guild.
