= Storytelling System =

Tabletop role-playing game system

The Storytelling System is a role-playing game system created by White Wolf, Inc. for the Chronicles of Darkness (formerly known as the New World of Darkness), a game world with several tabletop role-playing games tied in. The Storytelling System is largely based on the Storyteller System, the rule set used for White Wolf's older game setting, the World of Darkness (for a time known as old or classic World of Darkness).

== History ==
While on the road to Gen Con '90, Mark Rein-Hagen came upon the idea of a new game design that would become Vampire: The Masquerade. Tom Dowd, co-designer for Shadowrun, worked with Rein-Hagen to adapt the core mechanics from his previous game success to use d10 instead of d6 for calculating probability.

Over the next few years, several games were published under this rule set. The World of Darkness games exclusively used this ruleset, as did Street Fighter: The Storytelling Game (1995), Trinity (1997), and Exalted (2001).

The Storyteller System was discontinued in 2003 after completing the metaplot building up since Vampire: The Masquerade. It was replaced by the Storytelling System, a more streamlined rule set. The Storytelling System premiered in The World of Darkness in 2004.

== Character creation ==
Storytelling System characters are built with character points that represent a Dot on their character sheets. Each Dot represents a ten-sided die (d10). The more Dots in an Attribute or Skill, the better the character is at those abilities. A set of dice representing the Dots in an Attribute or Skill forms a Dice Pool that the character uses to see if they succeed or fail at specific tasks.

Characters have nine Attributes in three groups: Mental, Physical, and Social. In the Storytelling System, Attributes are also divided into three use-based categories: Power (the ability to alter one's environment), Finesse (the ability to use power efficiently), and Resilience (the ability to cope with power being exercised upon one's self).

Storytelling System Attributes
	Mental	Physical	Social
Power	Intelligence	Strength	Presence
Finesse	Wits	Dexterity	Manipulation
Resilience	Resolve	Stamina	Composure

All Attributes are rated on a scale from one to five dots. Two dots represents an average capacity in that attribute, while five displays the peak of human ability. Attributes generally cannot have a rank of zero within the Storytelling System.

Characters have a wide array of Skills to choose from that represent specialized areas of knowledge. Like Attributes, each Ability / Skill has up to five dots to represent a character's abilities. Unlike attributes, however, abilities can have no dots filled in to represent a complete lack of training and experience.

Advantages in the game are such things as the character's Defense score, Health, Initiative, Morality, Size, Speed, and Willpower. Most of these either exist as pre-assigned values as part of character creation, or are derived from one or more of the character's Attributes or Skills.

In the Storytelling System, each character has one Virtue and one Vice. A Virtue is some defining quality of a character's personality and an ideal which they struggle to aspire. A Vice is a basic weakness in the character's personality, and a flaw or guilty pleasure they may indulge even while knowing that there may be consequences to suffer. Characters can regain willpower by fulfilling their Virtue or Vice.

In the Storytelling System, playable supernatural characters are created by applying a template to the character during character creation, before Merits or Experience. For instance, with a Vampire character, a template describing certain vampiric attributes (Disciplines, Blood points, etc.) is added. To keep the game balanced, only one supernatural template can be applied per character.

Merits are special beneficial abilities and strengths a character may possess. They are similar in a way to Feats in d20 System games, allowing characters to do something the main rules usually don't allow. They are organized in the Mental, Physical, and Social categories like Attributes and Skills. In the Storytelling System, starting characters get 7 Dots to purchase Merits. Some Merits apply to certain Attributes and provide a bonus when using them. Some also require a certain number of Dots in some other Attribute in order to purchase them. Each Trait has a certain number of Dots associated which indicate its Dot cost. A Trait with 4 Dots, for example, "Common Sense", costs 4 Dots to purchase. Others have a range of Dots; "Language" for instance, is one Dot, and a character can buy a certain level of it as they choose.

== Game mechanics ==
All game mechanics of the Storytelling System utilize a number of 10-sided dice (d10s). The Game Master is called the Storyteller.

Depending on what the situation calls for, a character has a number of Dots in Attributes and Skills associated with the task. Each Dot represents a d10 die that is added to a dice pool to roll for task resolution. For example, if a character is scaling a wall, they add the number of Dots in their Strength Attribute and their Athletics Skill together. In this case, if the character has a Strength of 3 Dots, and an Athletics Skill of 4 Dots, they get 7 dice in a Dice Pool that combines the two (such as weight-lifting or other feats of strength).

Both systems roll their dice pool with the goal of beating a target number. In Chronicles of Darkness games the target number is always 8. Each of the dice that comes up at or above the target number counts as a "Success," with higher numbers of successes reflect a greater degree of accomplishment.

Modifiers are either bonuses or penalties to a die roll that are determined and added in by the Storyteller, subtracting or adding to the number of dice that can be rolled in a Dice Pool to a maximum of 5.

Anytime a character has absolutely no dice remaining in their pool as a result of negative Modifiers, the task would seem impossible to perform. The character is still allowed a single d10 die roll, called a Chance Roll, to see if sheer blind luck or divine intervention allows them to succeed. Only a result of 10 is a Success on a Chance Roll, but it can be rerolled for more Successes as above), on the other hand a result of 1 is a Dramatic Failure.

Time in Storytelling System is measured in small Turns of three seconds. Turns further make up a Scene, which further make up a Chapter. A Chapter is usually one gaming session and Chapters are linked together into an overall Story set in a Chronicle (or the Big Picture), the theme and setting of the entire game.

There are three basic kinds of Actions in the Storytelling System. Instant Actions take up very little time like taking a gun off safety, or shouting a small message to an ally. Extended Actions take longer time to accomplish and can extend over a number of Turns to complete, like getting a stuck window open, or changing a light bulb. Contested Actions are Actions that involve dealing with what the opposition does, like shooting at a running target during a Combat Scene.

For every Success a character has on their Attack roll against an opponent, they inflict one Health Point of Damage upon the target. There are three kinds of Damage in White Wolf games: Bashing, Lethal and Aggravated. Bashing Damage is inflicted by blunt objects that bludgeons targets like a baseball bat. Lethal Damage is caused by slashing and piercing weapons like knives and guns. Aggravated Damage is inflicted mainly by supernatural sources and the weaknesses of supernatural creatures (such as fire and sunlight against vampires or silver against werewolves); however, it can also be inflicted by severe radiation poisoning. Characters recover from Bashing Damage quickly, while Aggravated Damage takes the longest to recover from.

Health boxes are checked off by Damage. When the last box is checked with bashing damage, a character is generally at risk of passing out, if the last box is checked with lethal damage, a character is helpless and generally at risk of dying without medical attention, and if the last box is checked with aggravated damage, a character is dead. If a character's Health track is filled with Bashing Damage, any additional Bashing Damage is upgraded to Lethal, and if a character's Health track is filled with Lethal Damage, any additional Bashing or Lethal damage is upgraded to Aggravated.

After a game, a Storyteller can award experience points to players to improve their character's Attributes, Talents and Skills. Experience distribution is typically based upon roleplaying performance (especially if flaws are present), as well as accomplishing short- and long-term goals.

== Variant systems ==
=== Storyteller System ===
The Storyteller system used Abilities instead of Skills. The Mental attributes included Perception instead of Resolve, while the social Attributes of Charisma and Appearance were replaced on the sheet by Presence and Composure, respectively. Unlike all other attributes in the Storyteller system–and unlike all attributes in the Storytelling System–Appearance could have zero dots in it, although this was only to reflect particularly hideous or monstrous characters.

Further, the Target Number for rolls (which was a number a player needs to roll at or above on his dice in order to generate a Success) is variable for most games, although defaulting to 6 for most rolls: a 50% success chance for an individual die.

Unlike the Storytelling system's exclusive reliance on Experience points, "Bonus Points" were given out to characters as part of character creation, with more powerful or experienced characters getting additional Bonus Points at character creation. These points were spent like experience points, but were frequently a flat cost per level of a trait increased, as opposed to the increasing cost of experience points to reflect the difficulty of higher levels of mastery.

The Storyteller System frequently treated Merits as optional and frequently did not include them in the core books of most games; if the Storyteller allowed them, they could be purchased with Bonus Points. Merits had costs ranging from 1 to 7 points. Players could also receive Bonus Points for taking Flaws for their character. Certain traits that would later be codified as Merits still existed, but were instead referred to as Backgrounds; advantages such as Contacts, Resources and Status were universal across gamelines.

Whereas most Storytelling games use Virtues and Vices, these do not exist in most games, and are very different where they do exist: Vampire: The Masquerade uses them for varying forms of self-control, and Hunter: The Reckoning ties them directly to Hunters' supernatural powers. In the mechanical place of Virtue and Vice, most games had instead "Nature," reflecting a character's innermost personality, and "Demeanor," showing the persona the character displayed to the world at large.

World of Darkness games suggest players to have at least ten d10s available to roll for their character's task resolutions and Attribute tests; other games, such as Exalted, may use more.

=== Mind's Eye Theatre ===
The Mind's Eye Theatre system, is designed for LARP rather than tabletop roleplaying, and drastically overhauls the core mechanics to adjust for the different playstyle demands, resolving conflicts either through drawing from a deck of cards or by rounds of rock paper scissors.

=== God-Machine Rules ===
In July 2013, White Wolf released a rules update and the first in a series of intended "Chronicle Books" that would give a default focus for games and update their rules to work with the new rules released in The God-Machine Chronicle. The system changes include the addition of Conditions and Tilts, which are usually-temporary traits that can impact characters' abilities; while Conditions apply at all times, Tilts usually directly affect combat.

The Experience Point system also changed greatly: throughout a session, players now accumulate "beats" through coping with or resolving Conditions, dealing with hardships, or accomplishing goals. When the player accumulates five beats, she may redeem these for an Experience. Improving character traits is now flat, such that buying the first dot of a trait costs the same as purchasing the final dot of the same.

On August 16, 2014, Onyx Path Publishing revealed that they were publishing a second edition of the Chronicles of Darkness setting, using the God-Machine rules. They also announced that they would be releasing new editions of their first five games in the setting. While Vampire: The Requiem had released its The Strix Chronicle less than a year previous, Onyx Path conceded that the second edition of Requiem would be identical enough to Strix that they would supply a free PDF of the second edition to anyone who had already purchased a PDF copy of that book.

=== Storypath System ===
New games from Onyx Path, such as They Came from Beneath the Sea–as well as new editions of some older games, such as Scion and the Trinity line–use a new variant of the same mechanics, the Storypath system.

As part of the new editions of the Aeon Trinity games and the Scion gameline, a modified game engine was developed with the intent of being able to handle a wide range of character power levels. While the core mechanics remain the same as the Storytelling system, the Storypath system focuses significantly more on ludonarrative consistency: a major resource is Momentum, which does not represent any tangible or recognizable asset but instead the characters' narrative inclination to succeed in the story as a whole. It is spent by players to enhance or enable their character's abilities, and gained by encountering difficulties—failing at rolls, for instance, grants momentum—so that a character facing significant hardship eventually finds themselves with a surfeit of momentum to help them succeed in the end.

Another addition is Scale: a mechanic employed when one character has a significant advantage over another that may not be ideally rendered by a dice pool. A relatively weak giant in Scion, for instance, bears an increased scale in rolls relating to strength and damage, granting them bonus successes on successful rolls, but their lower dice pool would still have a small chance of success in the first place. The effects of scale differ against Narrative targets (scenery and nameless bystanders) and Dramatic targets (recognizable characters and objects with significance to the story). While successes are added to Dramatic targets, they are multiplied against narrative ones, allowing for impressive effects that do not automatically overwhelm central characters.

In August 2022, Onyx Path announced they would be releasing a streamlined, more unified version of Storypath, referred to as "Storypath Ultra," which would present some updated terminology (e.g. referring to "successes" on individual dice as "hits" to prevent confusion between a successful action and an individual "success" on a dice) and more thoroughly integrate some of its mechanics.
