= World of Darkness =

Series of tabletop roleplaying games

- Series logo
- Type: Tabletop role-playing games
- Genre: Horror
- Creator: Mark Rein-Hagen
- Publishers: White Wolf Publishing; Onyx Path Publishing; Modiphius Entertainment; Renegade Game Studios; Paradox Interactive
- Owners: White Wolf Publishing (1991–2006); CCP Games (2006–2015); Paradox Interactive (2015–)
- First release: Vampire: The Masquerade; July 1991
- Latest release: Deviant: The Renegades; September 1, 2021
- Sub-series: Chronicles of Darkness

Related media
- Kindred: The Embraced (TV series); L.A. by Night (web series); Vampire: The Masquerade (comic book); Video games

World of Darkness is a series of tabletop role-playing games, originally created by Mark Rein-Hagen for White Wolf Publishing. It began as an annual line of five games in 1991–1995, with Vampire: The Masquerade, Werewolf: The Apocalypse, Mage: The Ascension, Wraith: The Oblivion, and Changeling: The Dreaming, along with off-shoots based on these. The series ended in 2004, and the reboot Chronicles of Darkness was launched the same year with a new line of games. In 2011, the original series was brought back, and the two have since been published concurrently.

The games in the series have a shared setting, also named the World of Darkness, which is a dark, gothic-punk interpretation of the real world, where supernatural beings such as vampires and werewolves exist in secrecy. The original series' setting focuses largely on lore and overarching narrative. In contrast, the Chronicles of Darkness's setting has no such narrative and presents the details of its setting as optional.

The series has been well received critically for its setting, writing, and art direction, and has won or been nominated for awards including the Origins Award. It has also been commercially successful, with millions of game books sold; By 2001, Vampire: The Masquerade was the second highest-selling tabletop role-playing game after TSR, Inc.'s Dungeons & Dragons. The series has been adapted into other media, including the television series Kindred: The Embraced, actual play web series, novels and anthologies, comic books, card games, and a line of video games.

== Games ==
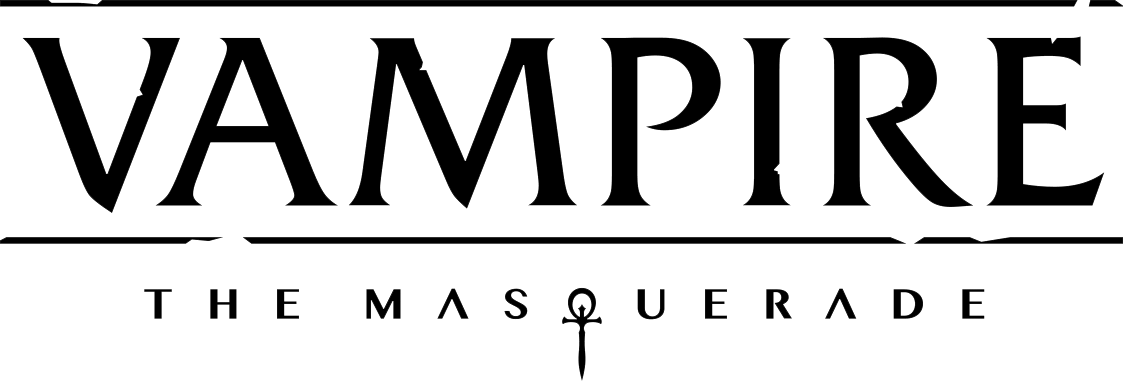
The series began in 1991 with Vampire: The Masquerade.

The original World of Darkness series consists of eight core lines of role-playing games, which were originally released from 1991 to 2002, presented here in order of release:

- Vampire: The Masquerade
- Werewolf: The Apocalypse
- Mage: The Ascension
- Wraith: The Oblivion
- Changeling: The Dreaming
- Hunter: The Reckoning
- Mummy: The Resurrection
- Demon: The Fallen

There have also been a number of spinoff games, such as the Asia-themed Kindred of the East and the historical Vampire: The Dark Ages.

In 2004, the series received a reboot, originally marketed as The World of Darkness, and commonly referred to as New World of Darkness (nWoD) to distinguish it from the original series. It initially consisted of a generic core rulebook, The World of Darkness: Storytelling System Rulebook, which provided the basic rules and mechanics for playing ordinary humans, alongside individual game lines that expanded the system with their own supernatural settings, character options and mechanics. Beginning in 2014, the game lines received second editions, which introduced standalone core rulebooks, allowing each game to be played without requiring the generic corebook. In December 2015, the series was officially renamed Chronicles of Darkness, to distinguish it from the original series, which had resumed publication. It consists of eleven game lines: Vampire: The Requiem, Werewolf: The Forsaken, Mage: The Awakening, Promethean: The Created, Changeling: The Lost, Hunter: The Vigil, Geist: The Sin-Eaters, Mummy: The Curse, Demon: The Descent, Beast: The Primordial, and Deviant: The Renegades. Most of these are based on concepts from the original series, directly as with Vampire: The Requiem and Vampire: The Masquerade, or indirectly as with Geist and Wraith, which both deal with spirits, while others, such as Promethean: The Created, have no direct counterpart in the original World of Darkness. Unlike the original series, the game lines share a common rules system but feature largely independent settings and mythologies, without an overarching metaplot connecting them. This allows Storytellers more freedom to interpret, modify, and expand the supernatural mythology of their settings without being constrained by a tightly interconnected canon. The shared rules system also makes it possible to combine elements from different game lines in crossover chronicles, allowing characters of different supernatural types, such as vampires, werewolves and mages, to coexist and interact within the same game.

Both series are supported with supplementary sourcebooks detailing backgrounds and character types, which can be used when creating adventures for one's players; pre-made adventure modules have also occasionally been published. The Chronicles of Darkness sourcebooks in particular present the information as optional and something one may choose whether to include in one's game. The supplements often take the form of a book describing a location as it is portrayed in the setting, such as Vampire: The Masquerade's series of By Night books and Werewolf: The Apocalypse's Rage Across series. Several splatbooks – sourcebooks detailing character classes or organizations – have also been published, such as the Clanbook series, describing vampire clans, and the Kithbook line, covering types of fae.

== Common elements ==
The games in the original series are set in a shared universe, also named the World of Darkness, which is a dark, gothic-punk interpretation of the real world, rife with corruption. In it, supernatural beings such as vampires, mages, and werewolves exist in secrecy, influencing humanity and clashing against each other; players take the roles of these beings, who belong to various classes such as Vampire: The Masquerade's vampire clans, and Werewolf: The Apocalypse's werewolf tribes. The series as a whole is themed around personal horror, while individual games have their own themes, such as redemption and humanity in Vampire: The Masquerade, and hubris in Mage: The Ascension. The series is known for its focus on metaplot – an overarching story for the setting that advances as new game books are released.

Another common characteristic is the use of character types, commonly referred to as "splats" by players. These define the different archetypes of supernatural beings and their subdivisions within each game, often determining characters' abilities, characteristocs, philosophies, cultures, and place in the setting. For example, vampires are divided into clans and bloodlines, werewolves into tribes, breeds, and auspices, mages into Traditions and their respective factions, and so on. These classifications are further explored in supplementary sourcebooks, commonly known as splatbooks, which expand on their histories, cultures, and internal conflicts.

Whereas the original series has a large focus on lore and background information for its setting, the urban horror Chronicles of Darkness setting does not to the same extent; it does not have a metaplot, and it presents any setting information as strictly optional to include in campaigns. With its lesser focus on lore and less defined world, Chronicles of Darkness also streamlines the character types, stripping the many vampire clans and werewolf tribes from the original series down to five each.

The person leading campaigns – a role called gamemaster or dungeon master in other games – is called a storyteller in World of Darkness, highlighting how the series is more focused on collaborative storytelling than on combat or on players overcoming the game leader's challenges; the rules exist to give players a framework for telling stories, and players are rewarded by being part of the setting rather than by escalating power levels. Chronicles of Darkness has a larger focus on making the gameplay systems work together, enabling easier cross-over play between the games.

== History ==
=== 1990–2006: White Wolf Publishing ===
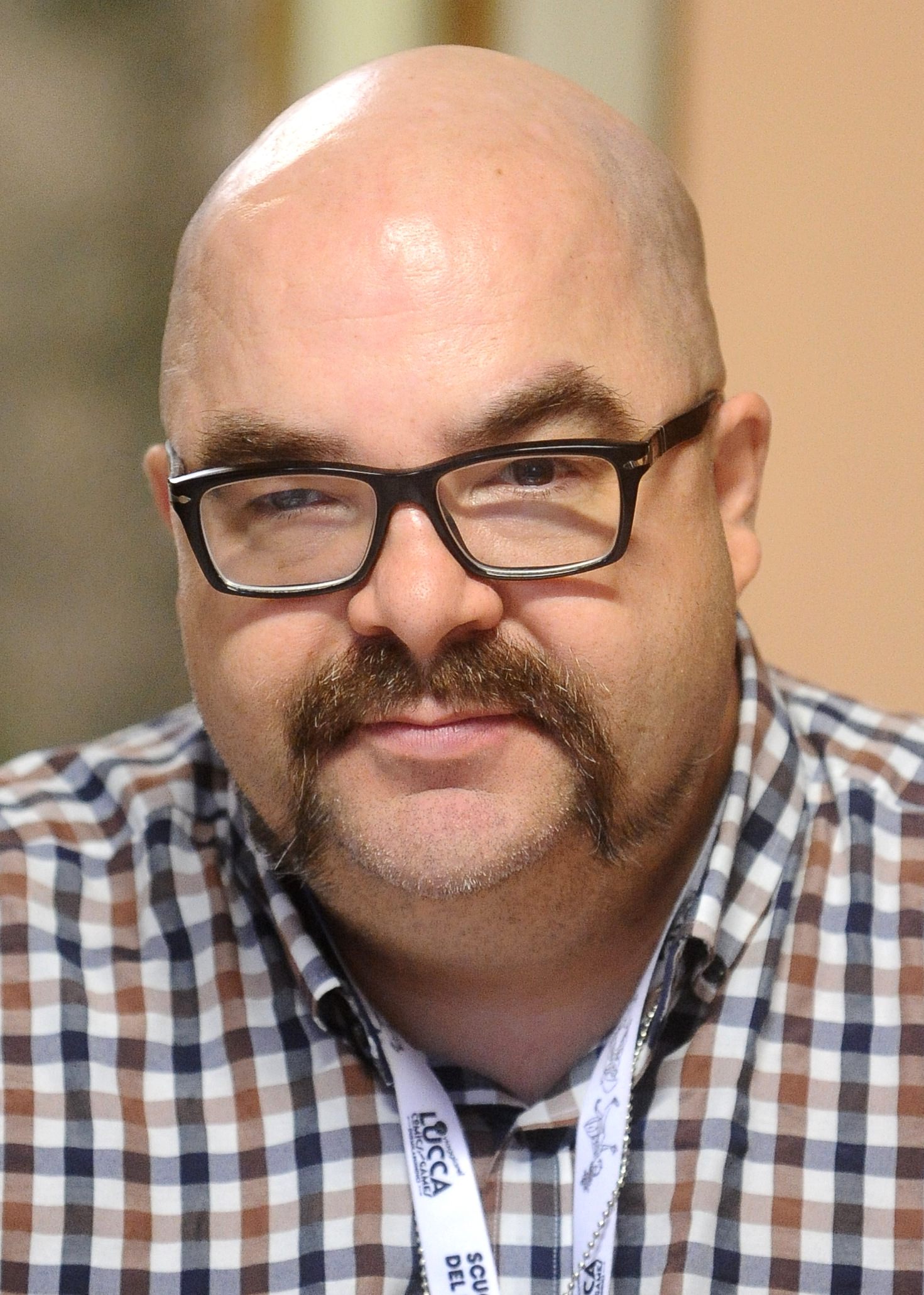
The series was originally created by game designer Mark Rein-Hagen.

The World of Darkness series began development in 1990 by game designer Mark Rein-Hagen at White Wolf Publishing, as his next major role-playing game project after 1987's Ars Magica. Designed as the first in a planned series of five annual games, Vampire: The Masquerade was released in 1991, and was followed by Werewolf: The Apocalypse (1992), Mage: The Ascension (1993), Wraith: The Oblivion (1994), and Changeling: The Dreaming (1995), all set in the same world and using the Storyteller rule system. This rapid expansion with new games, although successful and capturing players' and the industry's interest, led to often flawed first editions, prompting several revised, new editions of the core rulebooks between 1992–2000, resulting in Mage: The Ascension morphing a lot between its editions as its themes changed. Ars Magica was initially tied to World of Darkness and used as a historical backdrop: its House Tremere was reused as a vampire clan in Vampire: The Masquerade, and its Order of Hermes as a mage tradition in Mage: The Ascension. The rights to Ars Magica were sold to Wizards of the Coast in 1994, and the histories of the games were separated.

Rein-Hagen constantly moved on to designing new games after finishing one, designing all the original five games except Mage: The Ascension, which was designed by White Wolf Publishing's founders, brothers Stewart and Steve Wieck, and Chris Earley; as such, new staff were brought in to manage the game lines, including Andrew Greenberg for Vampire and Bill Bridges for Werewolf, who came to define the look and feel of the series. An economic downturn for White Wolf Publishing in 1995–1996, caused in part by bookstore returns for World of Darkness novelizations, led to a falling out between Rein-Hagen and the Wieck brothers, after which Rein-Hagen left the company. As the original planned five annual games had already been published, White Wolf Publishing next devised a new model of role-playing games with a historical setting based on previous games, resulting in Vampire: The Dark Ages (1996), Werewolf: The Wild West (1997), and Mage: The Sorcerers Crusade (1998), of which only Vampire: The Dark Ages sold well. This led to the cancellation of the underperforming Wraith line, with the release of the historical-setting Wraith: The Great War and the 1999 supplement Ends of Empire, which functioned as a finale to the game's metaplot.

In 1997, White Wolf Publishing developed another model, where they would release a game that required another World of Darkness rule book to play, which thereby would get the same attention as a new stand-alone core game without requiring them to further support it with supplements; this was used for 1997's Mummy Second Edition and its 2001 re-release Mummy: The Resurrection, and 1998's Kindred of the East. The two final major modern-day-setting World of Darkness role-playing games, Hunter: The Reckoning and Demon: The Fallen, followed in 1999 and 2002, after which White Wolf Publishing returned to historical-setting games with Victorian Age: Vampire and Dark Ages: Vampire, a new edition of Vampire: The Dark Ages, and a line of Dark Ages games based on other World of Darkness games that, like Kindred of the East and Mummy, required a main game's rule book to be played. A final game, Orpheus, was released in 2003 as a sequel to Wraith.

In 2004, following dwindling sales, White Wolf Publishing ended the series with the major event Time of Judgment: a line of books that ended the overarching narratives of Vampire: The Masquerade, Werewolf: The Apocalypse, Mage: The Ascension, Changeling: The Dreaming, Demon: The Fallen, Hunter: The Reckoning, Kindred of the East, and Mummy: The Resurrection. Following this, White Wolf Publishing rebooted the series with the 2004 rulebook The World of Darkness, and released new games with updated Storytelling System gameplay rules and a new setting, beginning with Vampire: The Requiem in 2004 and Werewolf: The Forsaken and Mage: The Awakening in 2005.

=== 2006–2015: CCP Games ===
CCP Games acquired White Wolf Publishing and World of Darkness in 2006.

In 2006, the Icelandic video game developer CCP Games acquired White Wolf Publishing and their intellectual properties, with the intention of developing an online video game based on World of Darkness. Business continued as usual until 2009, when CCP Games started transferring White Wolf Publishing staff to video game development and slowed down tabletop game production.

The CCP Games incarnation of White Wolf Publishing published its last print products for distribution in 2011, with Vampire: The Masquerade 20th Anniversary Edition, an update of the pre-reboot game. Amid mass layoffs at CCP Games the same year, leaving few resources to produce tabletop games, White Wolf Publishing's creative director Rich Thomas formed Onyx Path Publishing and licensed both of the World of Darkness series, continuing support for them and producing new material. This included further anniversary editions, and new games like Mummy: The Curse (2013) and Demon: The Descent (2014); these projects were frequently financed through crowdfunding.

=== 2015–present: Paradox Interactive ===
White Wolf Publishing and its intellectual properties were sold again in 2015, to the Swedish video game publisher Paradox Interactive. Following this, the rebooted World of Darkness series was renamed Chronicles of Darkness, while the original series remained as World of Darkness. This was done to prevent confusion among players over there being two series and settings with the same name: Prior to the renaming, the two had been distinguished from each other by being referred to as the Old or Classic World of Darkness and the New World of Darkness. Onyx Path Publishing's in-development Vampire: The Masquerade 4th Edition, which they had announced only a few months earlier, was cancelled following this, as Paradox Interactive planned to publish their own fifth edition. (Note: Onyx Path Publishing had planned their 4th Edition as a follow-up to Revised Edition (the game's third edition), seeing the anniversary release as a compilation rather than its own edition. Paradox Interactive counts 20th Anniversary Edition as the fourth edition instead.)

The Paradox Interactive incarnation of White Wolf Publishing released the fifth edition of Vampire: The Masquerade in 2018, which included references to neo-Nazis and a character interpreted as being a pedophile, leading to accusations that they were catering to neo-Nazi groups. White Wolf Publishing denied that this was their intention, and apologized. Following the use of the real-world anti-gay purges in Chechnya as the backdrop for fictional events in Vampire: The Masquerade sourcebooks, in what Paradox Interactive's vice president of business development described as a "crude and disrespectful" way, Paradox Interactive integrated White Wolf Publishing directly into the parent company, made changes to its leadership, suspended sales and printings of the books, and halted its development and publishing of World of Darkness games. The material was removed from the books, and Vampire: The Masquerade development was moved to the licensee Modiphius Entertainment and collaborators including Onyx Path Publishing.

Starting with the 2020 book Vampire: The Masquerade Companion, Paradox Interactive introduced further changes to the handling of the series: headed by creative lead Justin Achilli, they would develop core game books internally, while collaborator Renegade Game Studios would develop other game material. Along with this reorganization, Paradox Interactive announced that World of Darkness development from then on would involve sensitivity reviewers to ensure respectful portrayal of themes and topics. In addition to tabletop game development, the World of Darkness team at Paradox Interactive plans the setting's overarching narrative, and coordinates with external developers, such as those of World of Darkness video game adaptations, to ensure cohesion.

== Related media ==
In addition to the tabletop games, the series has expanded into other media, including video games, card and board games, the Mind's Eye Theatre series of live action role-playing games, novels, fiction anthologies, comics, the 1996 television series Kindred: The Embraced, the actual play web series – L.A. by Night (2018), Seattle by Night (2019), Vein Pursuit (2020), The Nightlife (2021), and NY by Night (2022) – and an in-development film and television franchise. Although World of Darkness multimedia projects slowed down under CCP Games, production began anew after Paradox Interactive acquired the series.

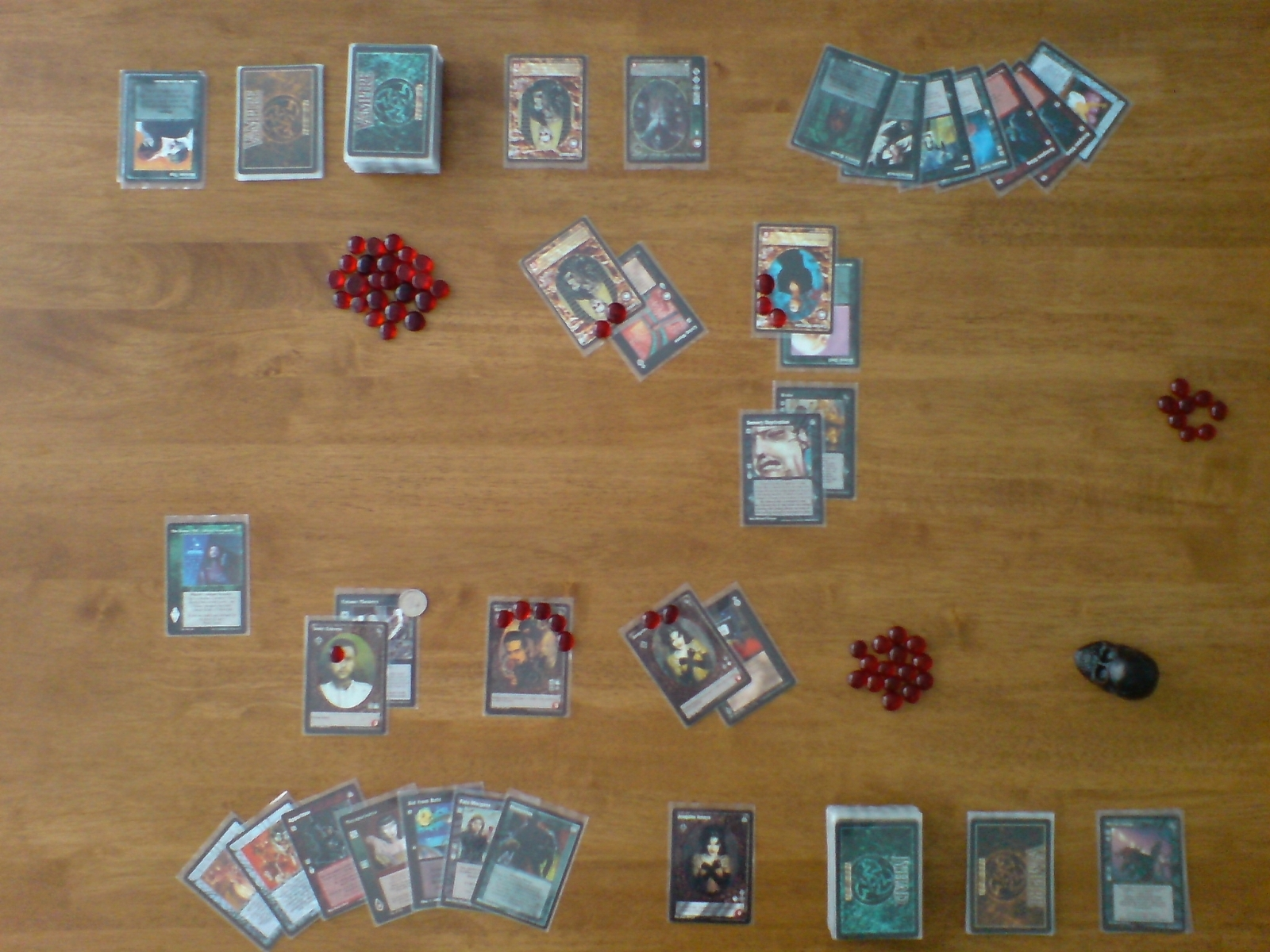
A two-player game of Vampire: The Eternal Struggle

A collectible card game based on Vampire: The Masquerade was released by Wizards of the Coast in 1994 as Jyhad, before being re-launched a year later as Vampire: The Eternal Struggle; Wizards of the Coast continued publishing it until 1996, and then White Wolf took over, publishing it in 2000–2010. In 2018, Black Chantry Productions licensed The Eternal Struggle, reprinting old cards and continuing production of the game. Following The Eternal Struggle, White Wolf also published a collectible card game on their own, Rage, based on Werewolf: The Apocalypse, from 1995 to 1996, which was even more successful than The Eternal Struggle; Five Rings Publishing licensed it, and continued producing it in 1998–1999. Two other Vampire: The Masquerade card games, Vendetta and Rivals, were released in 2021 by Horrible Guild and Renegade Game Studios, respectively. A story-based board game, Vampire: The Masquerade – Chapters, is in development by Flyos Games.

A large number of World of Darkness novels and anthologies have been published, starting with the Werewolf: The Apocalypse anthology Drums Around the Fire in 1993, and were described by What Do I Read Next? A Reader's Guide to Current Genre Fiction as "old-fashioned adventures" in the style of pulp fiction. The books were popular and helped White Wolf Publishing grow, and were described as leading among horror novelizations by The Mammoth Book of Best New Horror in 1996, but were in the end not financially successful, due to book chains closing mall stores in 1995–1996 and returning a large amount of unsold books to the publisher. By 1998, What Do I Read Next? considered the novelizations to have improved in quality, citing White Wolf's move to commissioning established horror and fantasy writers; in 2002, Black Gate considered Andrew Bates's Year of the Scarab Trilogy a standout compared to previous "lackluster" World of Darkness novels. New World of Darkness novelizations started to disappear around 2006, but have since resumed.

The series has been adapted into comics, sometimes published in the World of Darkness tabletop game books, but also as comic books, including Vampire: The Masquerade and Werewolf: The Apocalypse lines published by Moonstone Books in the early 2000s, and a Vampire: The Masquerade series published by Vault Comics since 2020.

There are several video game adaptations of the series, based on Vampire: The Masquerade, Hunter: The Reckoning, Mage: The Ascension, Werewolf: The Apocalypse, and Wraith: The Oblivion. Critical reception of the games has varied, ranging from average to positive, with 2004's Vampire: The Masquerade – Bloodlines standing out, being described by video game publications as a cult classic and a "flawed masterpiece"; when Paradox Interactive acquired the series, they had considered Bloodlines the "crown jewel" of World of Darkness, and something they knew from the start that they wanted to bring back with a sequel.

== Reception ==
World of Darkness has been critically well received, with several of its games having won or been nominated for awards, and with Vampire: The Masquerade having been inducted into the Origins Award hall of fame. The series has also been highly successful financially, primarily in the United States, with over three million game books sold by the late 1990s; around 1995, new World of Darkness releases were frequently top sellers, making White Wolf the second biggest publisher of tabletop role-playing games at the time after TSR, Inc., and by 2001, Vampire: The Masquerade was the second best selling tabletop role-playing game after TSR, Inc.'s Dungeons & Dragons. Onyx Path Publishing's crowdfunding campaigns for World of Darkness games and material have also been successful, particularly those for the original series, such as the anniversary editions of Werewolf: The Apocalypse and Mage: The Ascension.

The series' setting, plot, and art direction have been well received, with Rue Morgue describing the series' "fabulous artwork" as one of its major strengths, Fenix praising the series' mood and the quality of the writing, and Realms of Fantasy appreciating the broad scope and the familiarity to players due to being based on the real world. Shadis described the setting as "truly unique", bringing something never before seen to games. Some publications found the setting too crowded or defined, however; Diehard GameFan thought this took away from opportunities for horror, and Tor.com thought it left little room to tell new stories, often choosing to ignore the metaplot when running games. In his book series Designers & Dragons, Shannon Appelcline considered the series' focus on metaplot to likely be what had caused sales to dwindle prior to the reboot, as players would have stopped playing the games when feeling they could not keep up with the story. Reactions to the Chronicles of Darkness setting have been divided, with some preferring the original series' setting for being more fantastical and grand in scale, and some the reboot's more grounded setting.

The original series' rules were criticized by Arcane as, although generally easy to understand, often having confusing and unclear combat rules, while Tor.com described them as having a recurring problem with statistical anomalies. The updated gameplay rules of Chronicles of Darkness were however generally seen as a big improvement, and seen by critics as fluid, elegant and open-ended, to the point where Tor.com and Backstab recommended using them even when running non–Chronicles of Darkness games. Fenix appreciated the speed of creating characters and of playing, comparing the system of dice pools and dots favorably to number-based role-playing game systems.

In his 2023 book Monsters, Aliens, and Holes in the Ground, RPG historian Stu Horvath noted,

For all of the innovation and great ideas on display across all of the World of Darkness lines, there were problems from the start. The first version of nearly every game in the series was ugly and semi-broken, followed soon after by the second edition, which attempted to salvage the games with corrections and tidier production values. Given that White Wolf books had a habit of physically falling to pieces in short order, that is, perhaps, a feature and not a bug.
