= Mage: The Ascension =

1993 tabletop role-playing game

- Revised Edition cover
- Designers: Stewart Wieck, Christopher Earley, Stephan Wieck, Bill Bridges, Sam Chupp, Andrew Greenberg, Chris Hind
- Publishers: White Wolf Publishing
- Publication: 19 August 1993 (ed. 1); December 1995 (ed. 2); March 2000 (Revised Edition); 23 September 2015 (20th Anniversary Edition)
- Genres: Supernatural fiction Slipstream genre Technofantasy
- Systems: Storyteller System
- Synonyms: MtA

Mage: The Ascension is a supernatural fiction tabletop role-playing game first published on August 19, 1993, by White Wolf Publishing. It is set in the World of Darkness universe.

== History ==
Following the success of Vampire: The Masquerade, Mage: The Ascension was released as the third of the five initial World of Darkness games. The first chapter of the Mage series was launched by White Wolf Publishing at the Gen Con gaming convention on August 19, 1993. A second edition followed in December 1995, with a revised edition released in March 2000. In 2005, White Wolf Publishing merged with CCP Games. Following company layoffs in October 2011, White Wolf's Creative Director, Richard Thomas, founded Onyx Path Publishing to continue publishing Tabletop role-playing games. Onyx Path Publishing later introduced the 20th Anniversary Edition of Mage: The Ascension in September 2015, representing the game's fourth iteration.

== Game setting ==
Mage: The Ascension is set in the fictional World of Darkness, a fictional modern Earth wherein supernatural entities clandestinely manipulate everyday life. Players and major characters are "Mages", normal people who "Awaken" to be able to manipulate reality, usually in an expression of gnosis. The metaplot of Mage: the Ascension involves a four-way struggle between an alliance of Mages called the Nine Mystical Traditions; the New World Order of the Technocracy, which relies on its technofantasical "paradigms" versus the Marauders, a disparate group of insane Mages; and the Nephandi, a coalition of Mages serving evil cosmic entities in the pursuit of cosmic oblivion. Later editions of Mage: the Ascension introduce non-aligned Mage factions such as the "Hollow Ones", a group of Goth chaos magic practitioners.

== Rules ==
A key feature of Mage is its unique magic system. A character's magical expertise is described by allocating points to nine different "Spheres" of magical knowledge and influence: Correspondence, Entropy, Forces, Life, Mind, Matter, Prime, Spirit, and Time. Magical effects are largely spontaneously proposed by players and adjudicated by the game master, informed by the level of 'expertise' in the relevant Spheres of the effect; this is as opposed to the popular system of magic in Dungeons & Dragons, which relies upon predetermined descriptions of magical spells.

== Reception ==
Chris Kubasik reviewed Mage: The Ascension in White Wolf #38 (1993), rating it a 4 out of 5 and stated that "Mage offers the jaded gamer something intriguing: creativity. The rules of the game, through both cleverness and sloppiness, challenge all the players to be imaginative, not just the Storyteller."

Mage: The Ascension, 2nd Edition was given an 8/10 by Arcane's Adam Tinworth, who called it "good for those who enjoy involved and challenging games." He noted that while it could be difficult for new players to grasp the game's background, develop their style of magic, or figure out how the magic worked; the gameplay system itself would be easy to understand. Mage: The Ascension was ranked 16th out of 50 in Arcane magazine's 1996 reader poll of the most popular role-playing games of all time. The magazine's editor, Paul Pettengale, commented: "Mage is perfect for those of a philosophical bent. It's a hard game to get right, requiring much thought from players and referees alike, but its underlying theme—the nature of reality – makes it one of the most interesting and mature role-playing games available."

Mikael Sebag, in the journal Games and Culture, commented that "the in-your-face postmodernity of Mage: The Ascension, subjectivity fuels and defines the mage's spellcraft". He explained that "the game is richly inspired by historical and living magical traditions (including many [Antoine Faivre] would identify as belonging to Western esotericism)", noting the "central theme" is the search for Ascension. Sebag highlighted that Mage: The Ascension has a "comprehensive and richly-designed game system" except it does not include Ascension mechanics which "communicates the postmodern slant of Mage's core philosophy; the nature of reality, like Ascension, is subjective" and "systems exist only to describe that which is universally agreed upon". Sebag stated the magic system is one such universal system, "which, however variously different approaches to spellcasting may be described in the fiction of the game, uses a standardized set of formulas and in-game statistics to resolve these effects. Ascension, by contrast, is an experience so divine that it can be reduced to neither textual description in the game's rules nor mathematization in its systems".

=== Awards ===
- In 1994, Mage: The Ascension was nominated for the Casus Belli Award the best role-playing game of 1993, finishing in fifth place.
- Mage: The Ascension, 2nd Edition won the Origins Award for Best Role-playing Rules in 1995.

== See also ==
- List of Mage: The Ascension books
- Sphere Sigils from Mage: The Ascension
