= List of Vampire: The Dark Ages books =

Game books for Vampire: The Dark Ages

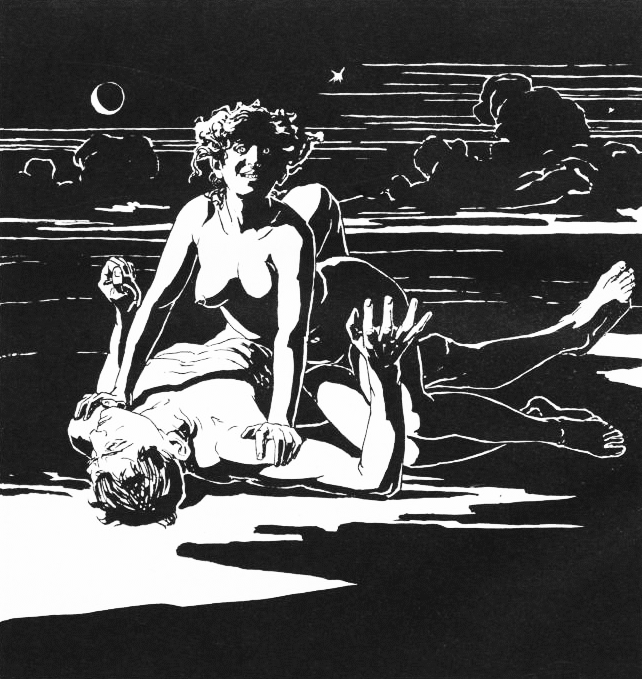
A 1899 illustration of a vampire, by Ernst Stöhr. In Vampire: The Dark Ages, players take the roles of vampires and other supernatural beings.

Vampire: The Dark Ages is a tabletop role-playing game in the World of Darkness series, where players take the roles of vampires and other supernatural beings in 1197–1242. It was first released by White Wolf Publishing in 1996, as a spin-off from their 1991 game Vampire: The Masquerade; it was released in new editions in 2002 (Dark Ages: Vampire) and 2015 (Twentieth Anniversary Edition), each of which updated the game rules. These have been supported with supplementary game books, expanding the game mechanics and setting.

The books from the game's original run in 1996–2004 were published by White Wolf Publishing, sometimes under their imprint Black Dog Game Factory for books considered more adult. Onyx Path Publishing, a company formed by ex–White Wolf Publishing staff, released one more supplement for Dark Ages: Vampire in 2014, and are the primary publisher of the Twentieth Anniversary Edition books.

The supplements include: the Libellus Sanguinis series, describing groups of vampire clans in medieval times; the Clanbook series, covering single vampire clans; the By Night series, describing real-world locations as they are portrayed in the setting; the Road line of books about vampire philosophies; guides to the game; and various other books. The game line was a commercial success, and the best selling of White Wolf Publishing's role-playing games with historical settings; it also performed well for Onyx Path Publishing, whose crowdfunding campaign for the Twentieth Anniversary Edition's production broke their participation records.

== Books ==
=== First edition (1996–2002) ===
Game books for Vampire: The Dark Ages' first edition
Title	Original release	ISBN	Publisher	Notes
Vampire: The Dark Ages	March 1996	1-56504-275-1	White Wolf Publishing	Core rulebook for the game's first edition. Set in 1197.
Book of Storyteller Secrets	July 1996	1-56504-277-8	White Wolf Publishing	Sourcebook for 12th-century Europe, and a magical bestiary
Constantinople by Night	October–December 1996	1-56504-278-6	White Wolf Publishing	Sourcebook for Constantinople
Clanbook: Cappadocian	March 1997	1-56504-280-8	White Wolf Publishing	Sourcebook for clan Cappadocian
Dark Ages Companion	May 1997	1-56504-279-4	White Wolf Publishing	Companion to the core rulebook, introducing extended game mechanics, and new vampiric disciplines and bloodlines
Liege, Lord and Lackey	June–July 1997	1-56504-281-6	White Wolf Publishing	Sourcebook for humans serving under vampires
Clash of Wills	August 1997	1-56504-289-1	White Wolf Publishing	Short adventure set in the United Kingdom
Libellus Sanguinis 1: Masters of the State	September 1997	1-56504-286-7	White Wolf Publishing	Sourcebook for the clans Lasombra, Tzimisce, and Ventrue
Transylvania by Night	September–October 1997	1-56504-287-5	White Wolf Publishing	Sourcebook for Transylvania, and Eastern Europe in general
Three Pillars	November–December 1997	1-56504-288-3	White Wolf Publishing	Sourcebook for clergy, royalty, and peasants, and for Italy
Transylvania Chronicles I: Dark Tides Rising	February 1998	1-56504-290-5	White Wolf Publishing	Collection of adventures. First in a series connecting Vampire: The Dark Ages and Vampire: The Masquerade.
Clanbook: Baali	June–August 1998	1-56504-213-1	White Wolf Publishing	Sourcebook for clan Baali. Published under the Black Dog Game Factory imprint.
Libellus Sanguinis 2: Keepers of the Word	October–December 1998	1-56504-294-8	White Wolf Publishing	Sourcebook for the clans Brujah, Toreador, and Tremere
Reichsgold: Aachen bei Nacht	1998	3-93161-252-X	Feder & Schwert	Sourcebook for Aachen, by the game's German publisher. Title translates to "Empire's Gold: Aachen by Night".
Transylvania Chronicles II: Son of the Dragon	1998	1-56504-291-3	White Wolf Publishing	Collection of adventures. Second in a series connecting Vampire: The Dark Ages and Vampire: The Masquerade.
Wolves of the Sea	January 1999	1-56504-298-0	White Wolf Publishing	Sourcebook for mortal and vampiric Vikings
Cainite Heresy	February 1999	1-56504-296-4	White Wolf Publishing	Sourcebook for vampires' influence on Catholicism. Published under the Black Dog Game Factory imprint.
Clanbook: Salubri	June 1999	1-56504-212-3	White Wolf Publishing	Sourcebook for clan Salubri
Fountains of Bright Crimson	August–October 1999	1-56504-270-0	White Wolf Publishing	Short adventure set in Jerusalem
Jerusalem by Night	August–October 1999	1-56504-299-9	White Wolf Publishing	Sourcebook for Jerusalem
Werewolf: The Dark Ages	1999	1-56504-357-X	White Wolf Publishing	Rulebook for medieval werewolves as playable characters. Crossover with Werewolf: The Apocalypse.
The Ashen Knight	April 2000	1-56504-241-7	White Wolf Publishing	Sourcebook for human and vampiric knights
Blood & Silk	June 2000	1-56504-242-5	White Wolf Publishing	Sourcebook for Asia and Asian vampires. Crossover with Kindred of the East.
Wind from the East	June–November 2000	1-56504-271-9	White Wolf Publishing	Sourcebook for Mongolian vampires. Follow-up to Blood & Silk.
The Ashen Thief	2000	1-56504-236-0	White Wolf Publishing	Sourcebook for human and vampiric bandits
House of Tremere	2000	1-56504-272-7	White Wolf Publishing	Sourcebook for the head chantry of the house of Tremere
Libellus Sanguinis 3: Wolves at the Door	2000	1-56504-203-4	White Wolf Publishing	Sourcebook for the clans Assamite, Gangrel, and Followers of Set
Bitter Crusade	January–July 2001	1-58846-214-5	White Wolf Publishing	Collection of adventures set during the Fourth Crusade
Libellus Sanguinis 4: Thieves in the Night	February 2001	1-58846-205-6	White Wolf Publishing	Sourcebook for the clans Malkavian, Nosferatu, and Ravnos
Veil of Night	March 2001	1-58846-206-4	White Wolf Publishing	Sourcebook for the Middle East and Muslim vampires
Iberia by Night	November 2001	1-58846-212-9	White Wolf Publishing	Sourcebook for Iberia
Ashen Cults	December 2001	1-58846-213-7	White Wolf Publishing	Sourcebook for vampiric cults
Under the Black Cross	2002	1-58846-275-7	White Wolf Publishing	Collection of adventures about the feud between the clans Ventrue and Tzimisce over Hungary

=== Dark Ages: Vampire (2002–2004 and 2014) ===
Game books for Dark Ages: Vampire
Title	Original release	ISBN	Publisher	Notes
Dark Ages: Vampire	July 2002	1-58846-276-5	White Wolf Publishing	Core rulebook for the game's second edition. Set in 1230.
Dark Ages: Europe	September 2002	1-58846-279-X	White Wolf Publishing	Sourcebook for Europe
Dark Ages: Mage	October 2002	1-58846-404-0	White Wolf Publishing	Rulebook for medieval mages as playable characters
Dark Ages: Inquisitor	December 2002	1-58846-282-X	White Wolf Publishing	Rulebook for members of the Inquisition as playable characters
Dark Ages: Storytellers Companion	2002	1-58846-278-1	White Wolf Publishing	Sourcebook for bloodlines, and advice for storytellers. (Note: The person leading the game is called the "storyteller" in World of Darkness games, a role called "gamemaster" or "dungeon master" in other role-playing games.) Bundled with storyteller screen.
Road of the Beast	2002	1-58846-280-3	White Wolf Publishing	Sourcebook for the vampire philosophy the Road of the Beast
Road of Kings	2002	1-58846-281-1	White Wolf Publishing	Sourcebook for the vampire philosophy the Road of Kings
Right of Princes	March 2003	1-58846-283-8	White Wolf Publishing	Sourcebook for rule over domains, and for life in cities and the countryside
Road of Heaven	May 2003	1-58846-285-4	White Wolf Publishing	Sourcebook for the vampire philosophy the Road of Heaven
Spoils of War	June 2003	1-58846-286-2	White Wolf Publishing	Sourcebook for warfare
Players Guide to Low Clans	August 2003	1-58846-287-0	White Wolf Publishing	Guide to vampire clans of lower social standing: Assamite, Followers of Set, Gangrel, Malkavian, Nosferatu, and Ravnos.
Road of Sin	September 2003	1-58846-288-9	White Wolf Publishing	Sourcebook for the vampire philosophy the Road of Sin
Dark Ages: Mage Grimoire	November 2003	1-58846-411-3	White Wolf Publishing	Guide to Dark Ages: Mage for players
Dark Ages: British Isles	December 2003	1-58846-290-0	White Wolf Publishing	Sourcebook for the British Isles
Players Guide to High Clans	December 2003	1-58846-289-7	White Wolf Publishing	Guide to vampire clans of higher social standing: Brujah, Cappadocian, Lasombra, Toreador, Tzimisce, and Ventrue.
Dark Ages: Werewolf	2003	1-58846-284-6	White Wolf Publishing	Rulebook for medieval werewolves as playable characters. Update of Werewolf: The Dark Ages.
Road of Humanity	February 2004	1-58846-297-8	White Wolf Publishing	Sourcebook for the vampire philosophy the Road of Humanity
Dark Ages: Fae	June 2004	1-58846-292-7	White Wolf Publishing	Rulebook for medieval fae as playable characters
Devil's Due	August 2004	1-58846-295-1	White Wolf Publishing	Sourcebook for demons
Dark Ages: Inquisitor Companion	2004	1-58846-291-9	White Wolf Publishing	Sourcebook for the medieval setting for members of the Inquisition
Dark Ages: Darkening Sky	January 29, 2014	—N/a	Onyx Path Publishing	Collection of five adventures set in Europe and the Middle East. Originally planned to be released by White Wolf Publishing in 2003.

=== Twentieth Anniversary Edition (2015–2019) ===
Game books for Vampire Twentieth Anniversary Edition: The Dark Ages
Title	Original release	ISBN	Publisher	Notes
Vampire Twentieth Anniversary Edition: The Dark Ages	July 29, 2015	—N/a	Onyx Path Publishing	Core rulebook for the game's Twentieth Anniversary Edition. Set in 1242.
Tome of Secrets	December 21, 2016	—N/a	Onyx Path Publishing	Sourcebook for vampire sorcery, nobility, chivalry, and faith
Dark Ages Companion	May 17, 2017	—N/a	Onyx Path Publishing	Sourcebook for the game's setting
Legacy of Lies	November 22, 2017	—N/a	Onyx Path Publishing	Introduction to the game, with an adventure, brief rules, and pre-made characters
France by Night	June 2019	978-2-37255-026-0	Arkhane Asylum Publishing	Sourcebook for France, by the game's French publisher
L'Hérésie Cathare	June 2019	978-2-37255-028-4	Arkhane Asylum Publishing	Adventure module set in France, by the game's French publisher. Title translates to "The Cathar Heresy".
