= Revelations of the Dark Mother =

1998 epic poem

- Cover art
- Author: Phil Brucato; Rachelle Udell
- Illustrator: Rebecca Guay; Vince Locke; Eric Hotz
- Language: English
- Series: World of Darkness
- Genre: Epic poem
- Publisher: White Wolf Publishing
- Publication date: November 1998
- Publication place: United States
- Pages: 123
- ISBN: 1-56504-237-9
- Preceded by: The Book of Nod
- Followed by: The Erciyes Fragments

Revelations of the Dark Mother, subtitled Seeds from the Twilight Garden, is an epic poem written by Phil Brucato and Rachelle Udell, illustrated by Rebecca Guay, Vince Locke, and Eric Hotz, and published by White Wolf Publishing in November 1998. Based on the tabletop role-playing game Vampire: The Masquerade and the World of Darkness series, the poem centers around Lilith and is her counterpoint to 1993's The Book of Nod, a poem focused on Caine, the first murderer. It is written in the same style as The Book of Nod, with heavy use of illustrations, and with a "vampire scholar" framing.

The poem was well received for its portrayal of Lilith and her inclusion in the vampire mythology, for adding depth to the Vampire: The Masquerade world, and for the art and design – particularly Guay's artwork of Lilith – although some critics were divided on whether it would be useful when playing the tabletop game. In 1999, the book was followed by The Erciyes Fragments.

== Summary ==
Revelations of the Dark Mother is an epic poem based on the tabletop role-playing game Vampire: The Masquerade and the World of Darkness series, providing background information on the character Lilith. It is written in the style of the earlier publication The Book of Nod (1993), and is Lilith's counterpoint to The Book of Nod's story of the biblical first murderer Caine, who in the fiction of Vampire: The Masquerade is re-imagined as cursed with vampirism and as the progenitor of all vampires. Like The Book of Nod, it has a "vampire scholar" framing device; makes heavy use of illustration; and has the same verse structure. The cover art, too, mirrors The Book of Nod's, featuring a silver pictogram on a black background symbolizing a progenitor – Lilith – surrounded by her offspring.

The book, which presents itself as a heretical document existing within the Vampire: The Masquerade fiction, written and compiled by the vampire scholar Rachel Dolium, begins with a foreword by Dolium, describing her research for the book; Lilith and her lessons of growing through pain; and the Bahari cultists who follow Lilith. Following this are three chapters:

- "First Circle: The Book of the Serpent" recounts Lilith's creation and her trials: Jehovah creates Adam and Lilith, the first man and woman, from True Earth in the garden of Eden. Lilith eats the fruit of the trees of life and knowledge, and learns to hunt. Adam angrily distances himself from her, and mates with beasts. Finding this detestable, Jehovah tells him to mate with Lilith instead; she refuses, repulsed by his actions. After Adam tries to rape her, she is lifted to heaven, becoming Jehovah's lover. Later, Jehovah jealously banishes Lilith, not wanting her to be his equal, and creates Eve, the second woman, from Adam's rib rather than True Earth. In the desert, Lilith meets Lucifer and becomes his lover and the ruler of the night. Wanting to create her own garden, she returns to Eden disguised as a Great Serpent and tricks Lucifer, who guards the entrance, into letting her in to steal seeds. Feeling sorry for Eve, she convinces her to eat of the fruit and then has sex with her. In turn, Eve shares the fruit with Adam. Angered, Jehovah exiles Adam, Eve, Lilith and Lucifer. Lilith and Lucifer create a new garden and have six children.
- "Second Circle: The Book of the Owl" retells some events from "First Circle" from Lilith's perspective, and recounts her meeting with Caine – sheltering him in the garden she has cultivated with Lucifer, and teaching him to grow through suffering. Lilith creates another garden, D'hainu, which grows until Caine returns with his vampiric descendants, who burn the garden and slaughter the children of Lilith and Lucifer. Lilith curses Caine and his descendants, except for Toreador and Nosferatu, who had pitied the dead.
- "Third Circle: The Book of the Dragon" recounts Lilith's declaration of a long night of suffering, particularly upon Caine and his descendants, that will finally end with her return during the end of the world.

== Production and release ==
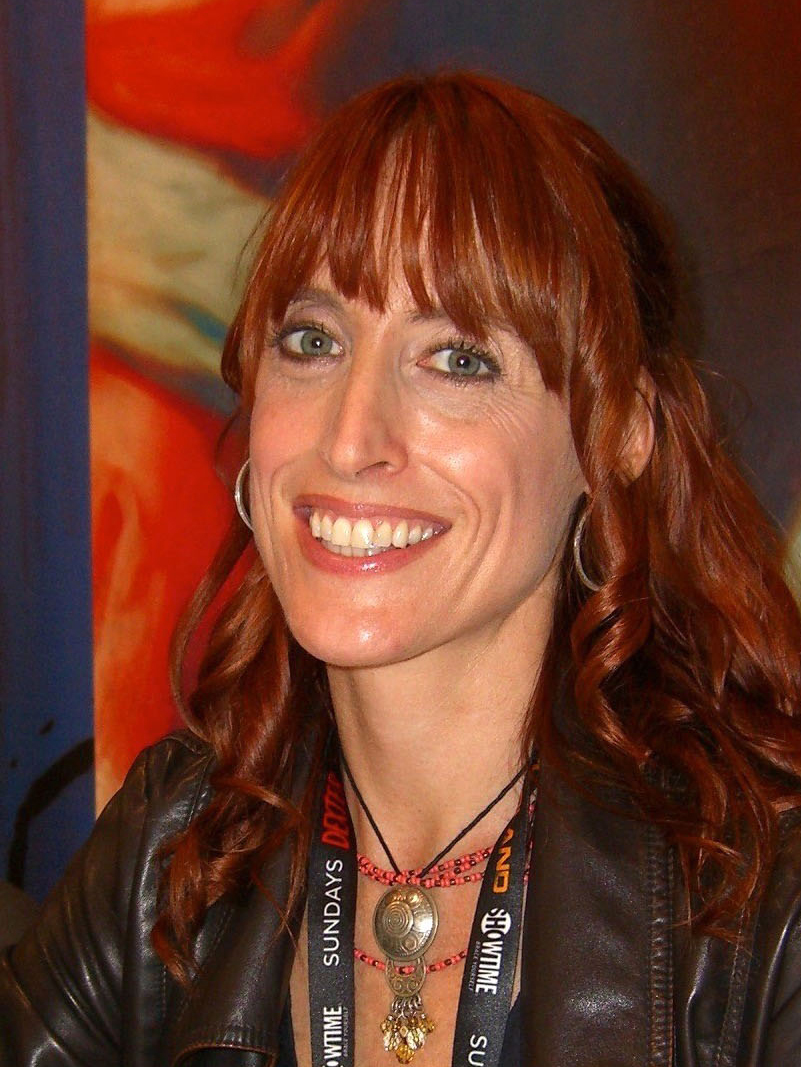
Rebecca Guay drew the main illustrations.

Revelations of the Dark Mother was written by Phil Brucato and Rachelle Udell, and was illustrated by three artists: Rebecca Guay, Vince Locke, and Eric Hotz. Guay drew the main illustrations for Lilith's story, using pencil or charcoal, and Locke illustrated the vampire scholar Rachel Dolium in the foreword. No works in the book are signed by Hotz, but Don Bassingthwaite, writing for SF Site, guessed that he was responsible for the pictograms.

The poem was released by White Wolf Publishing in November 1998 in the form of a 123-page booklet, and has also been published as an e-book. The poem was followed by the Vampire: The Dark Ages book The Erciyes Fragments in 1999. A German translation of Revelations of the Dark Mother was published by Feder & Schwert in 1999.

== Reception ==
In their Western Folklore article "Variations on Vampires", Yvonne J. Milspaw and Wesley K. Evans called the poem "powerful". They found the addition of Lilith, a feminine divine, to the Book of Genesis-based vampire mythology "elegant" and adding depth, with Lilith and Caine used as opposites to Adam and Abel across multiple axes: Lilith the wife versus Adam the husband, and Caine and Abel the brothers; and Lilith the stepmother versus Caine the stepson, and Adam the father versus Abel the son. They saw them as analogies for opposing life styles, and as adding oppositions of magical-versus-mundane, darkness-versus-light, and wilderness-versus-garden. Bassingthwaite called Lilith's story fresh, mature and sophisticated, and appreciated the voice given to her, describing her portrayal as that of a "strong, independent, magickal woman". Backstab called the book graphic, poetic, and inspired, giving Vampire: The Masquerade more depth, and thought that readers interested in alternate views of the Vampire: The Masquerade world and in interpreting and discovering what is revealed in the poem would love it; similarly, Envoyer enjoyed exploring the cryptic and metaphorical writing.

Guay's artwork of Lilith was well received by critics.

Bassingthwaite praised the book's design and layout, comparing it favorably to The Book of Nod: he found Guay's artwork beautiful, and conveying a Lilith that is "variously powerful, afflicted, sorrowful, loving, and avenging"; saw Locke's artwork as successfully setting off the foreword with its portrayal of Dolium; and called the pictograms interesting and organic. Backstab, too, liked Guay's illustration work, calling it "superb".

Discussing Revelations of the Dark Mother in the context of an extension of the Vampire: The Masquerade tabletop game, French magazine Casus Belli said that it, like The Book of Nod, would be of interest to those who find the game's occult-esoteric background fascinating, and appreciated its unexpected comedic elements, but thought that the way it only targets big fans of World of Darkness, and the lack of a French translation, could make it hard to use when playing Vampire: The Masquerade. Dosdediez, too, wished that it had been more useful as a game supplement; they found some of the stories "shocking", but considered the book as a whole to mostly be of interest to those caring about details in the game's vampire mythology, and wished that it had spent more time on discussing Lilith's and Caine's past. Envoyer did on the other hand find it useful as background information when portraying the setting in a game of Vampire: The Masquerade. Bassingthwaite thought that the poem would be most useful in a game dealing with themes of mysticism, conspiracies and end-times, with the section "The Rising Tides"'s prophecy of Lilith's return; he also saw it as useful for World of Darkness games outside of Vampire: The Masquerade, particularly Mage: The Ascension, Vampire: The Dark Ages, and dark games of Changeling: The Dreaming. Comparing it to its predecessor The Book of Nod, Dosdediez found Revelations of the Dark Mother lesser, while Magia i Miecz considered it an "amazing" work that lived up to the high standards set by The Book of Nod.
