= The Fragile Path: Testaments of the First Cabal =

1995 epic poem

- Cover art
- Author: Phil Brucato, Laura Perkinson, James A. Moore, Nancy Kilpatrick, Tina Jens, Beth Fischi, Owl Goingback
- Language: English
- Series: World of Darkness
- Genre: Epic poem
- Publisher: White Wolf Publishing
- Publication date: 1995
- Publication place: United States
- Pages: 136
- ISBN: 1-56504-432-0

The Fragile Path: Testaments of the First Cabal is an epic poem written by Phil Brucato, Laura Perkinson, James A. Moore, Nancy Kilpatrick, Tina Jens, Beth Fischi, and Owl Goingback. It was published by White Wolf Publishing in 1995, and is based on the tabletop role-playing game Mage: The Ascension and the World of Darkness series.

== Contents ==
The Fragile Path is a supplement presented as an academic work which relates the story of the First Cabal, nine mages who banded together against the Technocracy when it was still new.

== Reception ==
Adam Tinworth reviewed The Fragile Path for Arcane magazine, rating it a 9 out of 10 overall. Tinworth comments that "A few flaws slightly mar the book – the Songs of Bernadette contains some glaringly anachronistic phrases, and the early chapters lack a little pace – but these are minor gripes. This is a book essential to each and every Mage group."

Derek Pearcy reviewed The Fragile Path for Pyramid V1, #16 (Nov./Dec., 1995) and stated that "At times romantic, never dull, The Fragile Path succeeds in exactly the way many (if not most) other works of its kind fail – it inspires not just the mind but the heart. It doesn't merely give you roleplaying tips or adventure hooks, all wrapped up in some shallow sentimentality with the patronizing tone of instruction; it makes White Wolf's vision for the psyche of Mage characters more accessible to players, and inspires the effort to delve deeper."

Casus Belli described it as a Mage: The Ascension take on Vampire: The Masquerade's The Book of Nod.

== Reviews ==
- Casus Belli V1 #94 (May 1996) p. 26-29
- Dragon #212 (Dec 1994) p. 93-94
