= Clanbook: Cappadocian =

1997 role-playing game supplement

Clanbook: Cappadocian is a 1997 role-playing game supplement published by White Wolf Publishing for Vampire: The Dark Ages.

== Contents ==
Clanbook: Cappadocian is a supplement in which the focus is the mysterious and morbid clan of death. It follows the standard format: a brief introductory story, a historical overview, current clan structure, rules additions, and character templates. The fledgling discipline of Necromancy is explored, as well as the idea that the clan foresees its own demise.

== Reception ==
Adam Tinworth reviewed Clanbook: Cappadocian for Arcane magazine, rating it a 3 out of 10 overall, and stated that "Given the quality of Vampire the Dark Ages releases to date, this is a severe disappointment. And a disappointment that only completists will want to buy."

== Reviews ==
- Envoyer
- Fractal Spectrum (Issue 16 - Summer 1997)
- Casus Belli V1 #104 (Apr 1997) p. 11
- Dragão Brasil #77 (Aug 2001) p. 4
- Envoyer #30 (Apr 1999)
- Envoyer #32 (Jun 1999)
- Magia i Miecz #2000-11 p. 6
- Dosdediez V2 #3 (Dec 1997) p. 14
