= Phil Brucato =

American writer and game designer

Satyros Phil Brucato
- Occupations: Writer, game designer
- Writing career
- Genres: Fantasy, Role Playing Games, Music, Spirituality, Politics

Phil "Satyros" Brucato is an American writer, journalist, editor, and game designer based in Seattle, Washington. He is best known for his work on the TV series Strowlers and with White Wolf, Inc., including the role-playing games Mage: The Ascension, Werewolf: The Apocalypse, and Mage: The Sorcerers Crusade.

== Career ==
=== Music ===
In 1989, Phil Brucato became a founding member of Lonesome Crow, a heavy metal band from Richmond, Virginia. Throughout the 1990s, he played bass for Dark Cross, Aqua Blue, Widdershins, and Path of Trees. He has also dabbled in dance, especially contact improvisation, and is part of several 5Rhythms groups around San Francisco, Asheville, and Seattle.

=== Writer ===
Brucato is a writer, journalist, and editor, based in Seattle, Washington. He is best known for his work on the TV series Strowlers. Brucato, Bryan Syme, and Sandra Buskirk began publishing the webcomic Arpeggio in 2010. The story follows Meghan Susan Green, a young teenager, as she explores her magical musical talents. The comic was produced between 2008 and 2012, with final episodes released in 2015 and 2016.

He has written articles for BBI Media's newWitch and Witches & Pagans magazines. Brucato and Buskirk co-edited Ravens in the Library, a limited-edition fantasy anthology, in 2009 as part of a fundraiser for singer/songwriter S. J. Tucker. Additionally, Brucato founded Quiet Thunder Productions and is a member of the Wily Writers group.

=== Game designer ===
Brucato worked on several role-playing games for White Wolf, Inc., including Mage: The Ascension, Werewolf: The Apocalypse, and Mage: The Sorcerers Crusade. He also wrote for Deliria: Faerie Tales for a New Millennium.

== Awards ==
- ENnie Award for Everyday Heroes: Adventures for the Rest of Us – Best Written, 2005
- Wizard Magazine Editor's Choice Award for Mage: The Sorcerers Crusade – Best RPG Supplement, 1998
- Out of the Box Award for Mage: The Sorcerers Crusade – Readers’ Favorite, 1998
- GAMA award for Mage: The Ascension, 2nd Edition – Best Roleplaying Game, 1996
- RPGA award for Mage: The Ascension, 2nd Edition — Reader's Choice, 1996

== Select publications ==
=== Books ===
==== Deliria: Faerie Tales for a New Millennium ====
- Goblin Markets: The Glitter Trade
- Everyday Heroes: Adventures for the Rest of Us
- Deliria: Faerie Tales for a New Millennium

==== White Wolf, Inc. ====
- World of Darkness: Changing Breeds
- The Swashbuckler's Handbook
- Infernalism: The Path of Screams
- Revelations of the Dark Mother
- Destiny's Price
- Vampire: The Masquerade, Revised Edition
- Kindred of the East
- Guide to the Technocracy
- Mage: The Sorcerers Crusade
- Bastet: Nine Tribes of Twilight
- Tradition Book: Cult of Ecstasy
- Vampire: The Dark Ages
- Mage: The Ascension, 2nd Edition
- The Fragile Path: Testaments of the First Cabal
- Changeling: The Dreaming
- Black Furies

==== Onyx Path Publishing ====
- Mage 20th Anniversary Edition
- Mage 20th Anniversary Edition: Quickstart
- Mage 20th Anniversary Edition: How Do You DO That?
- Mage 20th Anniversary Edition: Book of Secrets
- Mage 20th Anniversary Edition: Book of the Fallen
- The Art of Mage: 20 Years and More
- Truth Beyond Paradox

==== Other role-playing works ====
- The Best Little Hellhouse in Texas
- Star Wars: Creatures of the Galaxy

=== Other works ===
- Open Your Heart to the Magic of Love (editor)
- Ravens in the Library
- Love Wisdom: A Soul's Journey to Wellness (editor)
- Rites of Pleasure: Sexuality in Wicca and Neo-Paganism
- Tritone: Tales of Musical Weirdness

=== Short fiction ===
==== Wyldsight: Tales of Primal Fantasy ====
- Waves
- Gramma Wolf's Garden
- Elynne Dragonchild
- Drinking the Moon
- Chaser

==== Where Thy Dark Eye Glances: Queering Edgar Allan Poe ====
- The Lord's Greatest Jest

==== Deep Cuts: 19 Tales of Mayhem, Menace & Misery ====
- Clown Balloons

==== Urban Green Man ====
- Johnny Serious

==== Night-Mantled ====
- I Feel Lucky

==== Maelstrom: Tales of Madness and Horror ====
- The Green Tunnel

==== Cabinet des Fées ====
- Drinking the Moon

==== Steampunk Tales ====
- Stormada

==== newWitch Magazine ====
- Vahlhalla with a Twist of Lethe

==== Bad-Ass Faeries ====
- Loopholes

==== Weird Tales Magazine ====
- Ravenous

==== Backstage Passes ====
- Special Guest

==== When Will You Rage? ====
- Shards

==== Drums Around the Fire ====
- Patchbelly and the Plague Wolf

=== Audio fiction ===
==== Wiley Writers Podcast ====
- Chaser
