= Tradition Book: Cult of Ecstasy =

Tabletop role-playing game supplement

- First-edition cover art by Michael Wm. Kaluta
- Designers: Phil Brucato (ed. 1); Lynn Davis (ed. 2); Jess Heinig (ed. 2)
- Publishers: White Wolf Publishing
- Publication: July 1996 (ed. 1); November 2001 (ed. 2)
- Genres: Tabletop role-playing game supplement
- Systems: Storyteller System
- Parent games: Mage: The Ascension
- Series: World of Darkness
- ISBN: 1-56504-412-6 (ed. 1): 1-56504-449-5 (ed. 2)

Tradition Book: Cult of Ecstasy is a supplement published by White Wolf Publishing in 1996 for the horror role-playing game Mage: The Ascension.

== Contents ==
Tradition Book: Cult of Ecstasy is a supplement which describes a class of mages who derive their Magick primarily from experiences related to sensuality and sensation. These include pain, drugs and sex. As Guide du Rôliste Galactique notes, "some ideas and illustrations in the book are clearly reserved for adults."

The book covers the history of this tradition, the current state of the cult and its code of conduct, relations with sleepers, vampires, and satyrs, various classes within the cult, and several notable members of the cult.

== Publication history ==
White Wolf first published Mage: The Acension in 1994, and supported it with many supplements, including a number of "Tradition Books" that described the various factions of Mages. This included Cult of Ecstacy, a 72-page softcover book released in July 1996. It was designed by Phil Brucato, with interior art by Darryl Elliott, Mark Jackson, Leif Jones, Heather J. McKinney-Chernik, and Joshua Gabriel Timbrook, and cover art by Michael Wm. Kaluta.

An expanded 104-page second edition was published in November 2001, designed by Lynn Davis and Jess Heinig, with interior art by Leif Jones, Matthew Mitchell, Steve Prescott, Alex Sheikman, Melissa Uran, and cover art by Christopher Shy.

== Reception ==
Adam Tinworth reviewed Cult of Ecstasy Tradition Book for Arcane magazine, rating it an 8 out of 10 overall, and commented that "Any player or referee will find this a valuable guide to playing Ecstatics. It lends validity to the claim that roleplaying is becoming a mature hobby. And I guarantee everyone will be very keen to read it from its glittery front cover to its glittery back cover."

== Other reviews ==
- Backstab #36 (Dec 2001) p. 104
- Casus Belli V1 #97 (Sep 1996) p. 10
