= Ethan Skemp =

American author and games developer

- Occupation: Game designer

Ethan Skemp is an author and developer of role-playing games.

== Early life and education ==
Ethan Skemp attended the University of California, where he was a member of a game club attended by several other students who would become role-playing game writers and artists.

== Career ==
Skemp is best known for his work for White Wolf, Inc. He has worked on numerous titles for Werewolf: The Apocalypse and Werewolf: The Forsaken, and was the designer of Werewolf: The Forsaken, along with other games of the new World of Darkness. He was one of the last line developers working at White Wolf before its demise.

Skemp was one of the authors on Vampire: The Dark Ages (1996). Skemp and Justin Achilli designed Werewolf: The Wild West (1997), which was described as the "Savage West version of Werewolf: The Apocalypse".

Skemp was involved in Exalted (2001), for which a reviewer noted that as he was part of the creative team responsible for the resurgence of the World of Darkness games, it was to be expected that the material in Exalted would be well written, in easy-to-understand and straightforward English.

Skemp was one of the authors on the Sword and Sorcery Studios release Player's Guide to Wizards, Bards and Sorcerers (2003), and he wrote the wizards section. Skemp was one of the designers on Werewolf: The Forsaken (2005).

Skemp was one of the writers and content designers on the video game Lichdom: Battlemage.

== Works ==
- Warriors of the Apocalypse (1996)
- Ghouls: Fatal Addiction (1997)
- Players Guide to the Garou (developer, 2003)
- Book of Auspcies (developer, 2003)
- Tribebook: Silver Fangs, Revised Edition (developer, 2003)
- Past Lives (developer, 2003)
