= Fall of London =

2020 tabletop game supplement for Vampire: The Masquerade

- Cover art by Tomas Arfert
- Designers: Matthew Dawkins; Steffie de Vaan
- Illustrators: Tomas Arfert, Michele Frigo, Rodrigo Gonzelez Toledo, Damien Mammoliti, Othon Nikolaidis, Edouard Noisette, Paolo Puggioni, Amy Wilkins
- Writers: Steffie de Vaan; Klara Horskjær Herbøl; Kira Magrann; Mike Nudd; Andrew Peregrine; Hilary Sklar
- Publishers: Modiphius Entertainment
- Publication: March 2020
- Genres: Tabletop role-playing game supplement
- Parent games: Vampire: The Masquerade (5th edition)
- Series: World of Darkness
- Website: Official website
- ISBN: 978-1-912743-53-7

Fall of London is a tabletop role-playing game supplement released in March 2020 by Modiphius Entertainment for use with the fifth edition of the game Vampire: The Masquerade, and is part of the larger World of Darkness series. The book has players take the roles of vampires who wake up in London in 2012 after having been unconscious since the 1940s, and who are sent on a job to acquire five artifacts around the city while vampire hunters from the Second Inquisition ready a secret attack on the local vampire community.

The supplement was developed by Matthew Dawkins and Steffie de Vaan, and written by de Vaan, Klara Horskjær Herbøl, Kira Magrann, Mike Nudd, Andrew Peregrine, and Hilary Sklar. The writers all worked closely together on the project, as necessitated by the supplement's non-linear game flow, with the chapters needing to be able to connect in several combinations. It was well received by critics, with praise aimed at its setting and characters, and how it lets players experience one of the big events of the Vampire: The Masquerade setting.

== Content ==
Fall of London is an adventure module ("chronicle") for Vampire: The Masquerade, consisting of six chapters, with six endings depending on the players' actions. Set in London in 2012, the supplement details the local vampire community leading up to and through Operation Antigen, a secret attack on vampires by vampire hunters from the Second Inquisition – an organisation formed by secret services around the world after they became aware of the existence of vampires.

Players take the roles of pre-made vampire characters who wake up from torpor while the Second Inquisition readies their attack, after remaining unconscious since the 1940s. These include Alice Mockingdale, a witch of the vampire clan Tremere; Tommy Smith, a World War I veteran of clan Nosferatu; Tony Castelli, a pragmatic trans man of clan Brujah; Lady Catherine Montague, an unfulfilled aristocrat of clan Ventrue; and Doctor Henry Banerjee, an occult medical practitioner of clan Hecata. They are awoken by devotees of the ancient vampire Mithras, and have been rendered amnesiac through a ritual, with only their devotion to the Cult of Mithras remaining clear.

Before they can flee the Second Inquisition, they are forced to finish a job given to them by the cultists, which involves locating five artifacts related to Mithras around London, now in the hands of other vampires. Throughout the story, the player characters regain their memory and free will. Chapters do not have a set play order, and typically each focus on one area of London, with various vampires to meet including the artifacts' current owners. Chapters also often contain flashback sequences, showing the city during other time periods.

Explorable locations for players include the Underground, through which one can traverse the city; the British Museum, which is secretly controlled by vampires and under watch by Antigen agents; The Shard, which is partially used by clan Ventrue vampires, and whose Shangri-La Hotel is home to the vampire Queen Anne Bowesley, prince of London; the London Mithraeum, a temple to Mithras; the Coronet Theatre, a meeting spot for a group of Anarch vampires; and Southall, a district that is home to many Asian immigrants.

== Production ==
Fall of London was produced by Modiphius Entertainment, at the time the company in charge of development of Vampire: The Masquerade's fifth edition. It was developed by Matthew Dawkins and Steffie de Vaan, who worked to ensure that the chapters aligned with each other and that the book adhered to the series lore. De Vaan was additionally part of the writing team, which also included Klara Horskjær Herbøl, Kira Magrann, Mike Nudd, Andrew Peregrine, and Hilary Sklar: each writer worked on one of the six chapters. Nudd, a Londoner, doubled as a consultant for the supplement's London setting, checking for accuracy and giving the project local flavour; the other writers and developers were Londoners, had lived there in the past, or had visited the city often. The supplement was mainly illustrated with photography, with some use of drawings, in line with the other fifth edition Vampire: The Masquerade books; the artists for the interior include Tomas Arfert, Michele Frigo, Rodrigo Gonzelez Toledo, Damien Mammoliti, Othon Nikolaidis, Edouard Noisette, Paolo Puggioni, and Amy Wilkins. Arfert additionally created the cover art.

De Vaan described the project as both a challenge and an opportunity due to its large scale. It began with extensive brainstorming sessions, based on a brief delivered by Modiphius Entertainment and White Wolf Publishing: it was to tell what happened to Mithras, and what happened to the vampire community of London following the Second Inquisition's activities there; it was also to detail London in modern times as portrayed in the World of Darkness setting. Nudd led the work on the story's background, and collated the information on Mithras from previous editions of Vampire: The Masquerade. As the story of Mithras' destruction left questions unanswered when it had first been described in the second edition of the supplement A World of Darkness (1996), the production team worked toward adding context to that story.

Following the brainstorming, the writers created first drafts of the chapters, which were edited for cohesion. The supplement was designed to be able to be played as freely as possible, with chapters 2–5 playable in any order; this meant that the production team had to work closely together, and increased the amount of work required, as chapter 1 had to be able to connect to all middle chapters, and chapter 6 needed to take into account all possible paths that could have led up to it. Chris Birch of Modiphius Entertainment described it as also being designed to update returning Vampire: The Masquerade players on what has happened in the setting, as the player characters themselves, having just woken up, need to learn what has changed; and to let new player do exciting vampire activities, including action and drama. The supplement was written to include many non-player characters, some of which were newly created for Fall of London, and some of which returned from previous Vampire: The Masquerade material; some were taken specifically from the 2002 game Victorian Age: Vampire's supplement London by Night, and updated for the 2012 setting. While these characters were often written to have their own agendas and to be manipulating the player characters for their own purposes, Dawkins and de Vaan decided from the beginning that they wanted the player characters to also have the ability to effect change and shape the story. Because the supplement is set in the past, the production team worked to ensure that it would give players information both on how London was prior to the events of it, and how it would be in the current-day setting of Vampire: The Masquerade.

=== Release ===
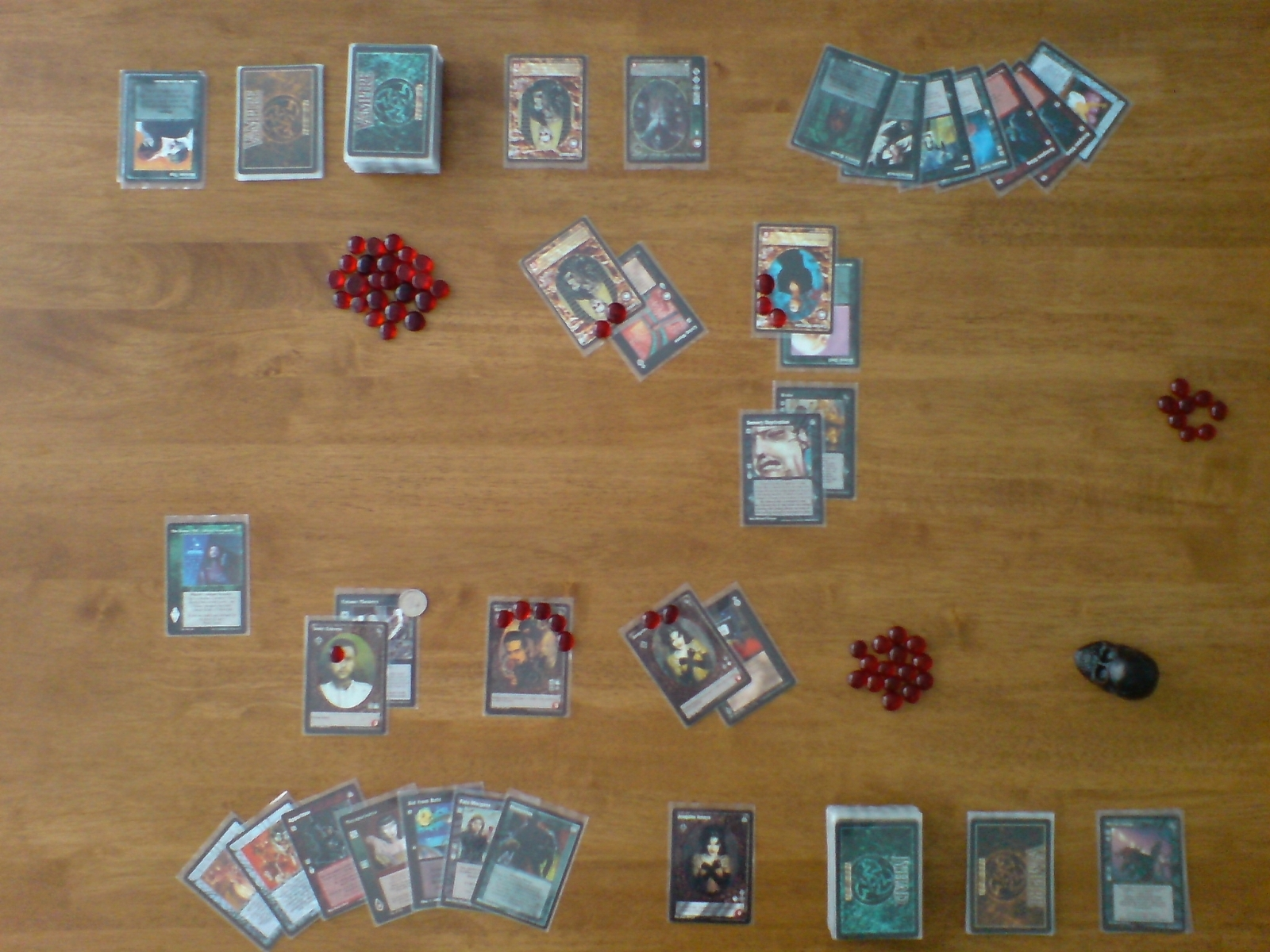
An adaptation for the card game Vampire: The Eternal Struggle is in development.

The supplement was announced by Modiphius Entertainment in 2018, along with the announcement that they would be managing the Vampire: The Masquerade line on license from the series owner Paradox Interactive. It was originally planned for release in mid-2019, but was still in development by July 2019, and was eventually released in March 2020 as a 260-page book. An Italian edition was released by Need Games on 15 December 2020, a French edition is planned to be released by Arkhane Asylym Publishing in November 2021, and a Spanish edition is planned to be released by Biblioteca Oscura.

Fall of London is planned to be followed by Second Inquisition, a supplement detailing the titular organisation further, after the core Vampire: The Masquerade book's abstract handling of them and Fall of London's description of their activities in London. Black Chantry Productions plans to adapt the book for the Vampire: The Masquerade card game Vampire: The Eternal Struggle, in the form of an expansion scheduled for release in 2021.

== Reception ==
Reception
Review scores
Source	Rating
Mephisto	5/5 stars

Fall of London was critically well received, and was considered by Tabletop Gaming as one of the best tabletop games of 2020. Tabletop Gaming and Mephisto recommended it for groups who may have played through the Vampire: The Masquerade Starter Pack and want something substantial and challenging; the latter considered it to have broken new ground and set a good example for future Vampire: The Masquerade supplements to follow. Game outlets liked how the supplement lets players experience one of the most important moments in the Vampire: The Masquerade setting and making them an active part of it, serving both as a good way to bring players through the fifth edition's story developments and as a good introduction for new players. Mephisto did however think that the supplement would not be very useful for long-term campaigns set in London beyond the end of the campaign.

Critics liked the characters and setting, with Mephisto calling the pre-made player characters diverse, well designed and integrated into the story, enabling players to interact with legendary London vampires, and Tabletop Gaming calling the supplement good at capturing what makes London special, showing many facets of it and its history. They considered the exploration of the city and interaction with characters to be what the supplement excels at, and although criticizing the "fetch quest" core conceit as unimaginative, thought that it does a good job of facilitating exploration.

The story and writing were well received, with Tabletop Gaming calling it beautiful and well-crafted, and Mephisto calling the use of flashbacks to show London in different times and to give insight into characters "brilliant". Tabletop Gaming thought that the supplement at times contained too much writing, however, which sometimes felt restrictive or made it difficult to quickly find information while playing, saying that it seems like the supplement at times forgets that it is meant to be played and not just read. Casus Belli considered the book "sober and refined", both in terms of content and aesthetic, and found its premise appealing.
