= Infernalism: The Path of Screams =

Infernalism: The Path of Screams is a 1998 role-playing game supplement published by White Wolf Publishing for Mage: The Sorcerers Crusade.

== Contents ==
Infernalism: The Path of Screams is a supplement in which the motives, bargains, powers, and societal impacts of Infernalists are explored, complete with demonic lore and a bestiary for gamemasters.

== Reviews ==
- Pyramid
- Interregnum #36
- Envoyer #37 (Nov 1999)
- Magia i Miecz #1999-12 p. 18
- Dosdediez V2 #18 (Jun 2001) p. 20
