= Libellus Sanguinis 1: Masters of the State =

Supplement for Vampire: The Dark Ages

Libellus Sanguinis
Masters of the State
- Cover art by John Bolton
- Designers: Robert Hatch; Craig Bolin; Richard E. Dansky
- Publishers: White Wolf Publishing
- Publication: 1997
- Genres: Horror
- Systems: World of Darkness

Libellus Sanguinis 1: Masters of the State is a supplement published by White Wolf Publishing in 1997 for the horror role-playing game Vampire: The Dark Ages. The book provides in-depth details about three of the vampire clans.

== Contents ==
Libellus Sanguinis 1: Masters of the State and the clanbooks that followed are designed to provide each player of Vampire: The Dark Ages with enough information about the clans and their different characteristics and motivations that the player can choose the clan that best engages them, enabling them to create a character that shares the same motivations as other clan members.

This book provides information on the three clans of vampire nobility: the Lasombra, Tzimisce and Ventrue. Details include the geographical and social power bases of each clan, history of each clan, common practices, plans for the future, new skills and disciplines, some character templates, and a few clan secrets. Each clan description includes a short description of what will happen to the clan in the future.

== Publication history ==
In 1991, White Wolf published Vampire: The Masquerade, a horror role-playing game set in the modern world. White Wolf also published a separate "clanbook" for each of the 13 vampire clans of the setting. Some critics complained of relatively unneeded "filler" in each book. Five years later, White Wolf published a "prequel" campaign, moving the storyline back to 1197 CE with Vampire: The Dark Ages. This was accompanied by a series of clanbooks titled Libellus Sanguinis (Book of Blood), but this time, each book focused on three clans rather than just one. The first of these was Libellus Sanguinis 1: Masters of the State, a 104-page book written by Robert Hatch, Craig Bolin, and Richard E. Dansky, with cover art by John Bolton, and interior art by Jason Felix, Michael Gaydos, and Eric Hotz.

== Reception ==
In Issue 247 of Dragon (May 1998), Chris Pramas liked the new approach of focusing on three clans in each clanbook. Pramas thought the clan descriptions were "competent enough", but felt that the authors fell down when describing the Tzimice, pointing out that although the clan has "great potential", the book sets them up to be "utter monsters from the start, ruling their lands ruthlessly, using mortals as so much chattel, and living lives of debauchery and extreme violence." Pramas felt that "this approach fails to appeal as a player character option in any way." Pramas also pointed out that this takes away the moral ambiguity of the Teutonic Knights and instead gives them the moral right to attack Tzimice lands, saying, "They cease to represent a conflict of cultures, a clash of Christianity vs. paganism, and the struggle becomes just another monster hunt." Pramas concluded by giving the book a rating of 3 out of 6, saying, "Masters of the State could have been quite interesting. Instead, it is simply adequate. Those engaged in Vampire: Dark Ages campaigns will certainly find useful material here ... The character of the Tzimisce and the absurd amount of vampiric influence, however, show an unfortunate lack of vision."

In Issue 6 of the French games magazine Backstab, Christophe Jouane commented "All the material is clearly presented and allows us to quickly understand the attraction that the Lasombra feel for manipulation, the natural propensity of the Tzimice for brutal methods and the sense of duty which pushes the Ventrue towards power. So many elements which will allow game masters and players alike to truly portray worthy representatives of each of these clans."

Writing for SF Site, Don Bassingthwaite noted "It would have been easy to stuff these supplementary clanbooks with filler. I'm glad White Wolf resisted the temptation." Bassingthwaite thought that "The write-ups here are wonderful. Each clan gets a nice chunk of treatment, enough that each also develops a distinct personality ... I'm very impressed by the way that the unique perspectives of the clans are brought out." Bassinghtwaite concluded, "If the original idea to produce clanbooks was good, the Dark Ages supplements are great, adding a new layer of historical detail to the World of Darkness. Even you don't play Vampire: The Dark Ages, I'd recommend getting your hands on these books. A good sense of history adds so much to a story!"
