= Wind from the East (supplement) =

Wind From the East is a 2000 role-playing game supplement published by White Wolf Publishing for Vampire: The Dark Ages.

== Contents ==
Wind From the East is a supplement in which the history of the Mongol Empire and its supernatural courts are detailed, introducing the Anda and Wu Zao bloodlines and the Black Tortoise Court while covering the Mongol invasions and the Kindred and Wan Kuei who ride with the Great Khan's horde.

== Reviews ==
- Rue Morgue #19
- Backstab #24
- Envoyer #48 (Oct 2000)
- Magia i Miecz #2000-11 p. 8
- Dosdediez V2 #20 (Apr 2002) p. 20
