= The Book of Nod =

1993 epic poem by Sam Chupp and Andrew Greenberg

- Cover art
- Author: Sam Chupp; Andrew Greenberg
- Language: English
- Series: World of Darkness
- Genre: Epic poem
- Publisher: White Wolf Publishing
- Publication date: 1993
- Publication place: United States
- Pages: 134
- ISBN: 1-56504-078-3
- Followed by: Revelations of the Dark Mother

The Book of Nod is an epic poem written by Sam Chupp and Andrew Greenberg, published by White Wolf Publishing in 1993. Based on the tabletop role-playing game Vampire: The Masquerade and the World of Darkness series, it tells the creation myth of vampires, following Caine, the first vampire and the biblical first murderer.

== Overview ==
The book is divided into three main sections:

- The Chronicle of Caine: Outlining the events of Caine's exile, through to the great flood of the Bible. These events include the murder of his brother, defiance of God's angels, encounters with Lilith, siring of other vampires, and the founding of the first city.
- The Chronicle of Shadows: A collection of various noddist lore, offering advice and commandments, some attributed to Caine, others to the Clan founders. Unlike The Chronicle of Caine, these fragments do not form a cohesive story.
- The Chronicle of Secrets: This section offers various portents and omens of the coming end times, known to vampires as Gehenna. While the signs of the end of days are conflicting, several strong themes come through, the most important being the final generations of vampires, shortage of blood due to overcrowding of hunting grounds, and the awakening of the Antediluvians, the most ancient of vampires.

The Book of Nod came with commentary by several Kindred scholars, including the Malkavian Aristotle de Laurent and his childe, Beckett. Supposedly the book was not meant to be widely distributed, but was stolen by a competing scholar Ayisha, who wished it available to all.

== Noddism ==
In the World of Darkness studying and searching on the Book of Nod is known as Noddism, with the Scholars being called Noddists. Officially the Camarilla denies the existence of the ancients, believing them long extinct, its Archons hunting and destroying Noddist lore. Unofficially many Camarilla elders fear and prepare for the coming armageddon. In contrast, the Sabbat actively seeks Noddist lore in hopes of forestalling the return of the Antediluvians, viewing itself as an army set against them.

A complete version of the book is unknown, though parts of it in various languages are known to exist. Fragments are widely distributed and well protected, as the secrets they contain may provide clues to the origin and fate of the kindred. Finding a complete version of the Book of Nod is comparable to finding the Rosetta Stone or the Holy Grail.

== Release ==
The book is planned to be re-printed by Renegade Game Studios in October 2022, both in a standard release and a "deluxe artifact edition," which consists of replica scrolls and a tablet.

== Related works ==
- White Wolf released several books containing supposed scripture from the Book of Nod. The Erciyes Fragments was included for the Vampire: The Dark Ages, along with a backstory detailing the Fragments' discovery and passing into the hands of the Giovanni.
- Revelations of the Dark Mother depicted the story of the first vampires from the point of view of Lilith, Adam's first wife. She was mentioned in the first book as the being who first awakened Caine to his true potential.
- These books were produced with the intention that individual Storytellers could provide information from them to their players, as the stories required.
- Several other Vampire: The Masquerade books contained passages of the Book of Nod. These often conflicted with each other and Storytellers were encouraged to add to the chaos, simulating the problems the Noddist scholars must face.
- Within the fiction of Vampire: The Masquerade, The Book of Nod was allegedly the inspiration that led the Byzantine priest Procopius to write the Book of the Shining Blood, the main scripture of the Cainite Heresy.

== Reception ==
Chris McCubbin reviewed The Book of Nod for Pyramid magazine and stated that "The Book of Nod is beautifully illustrated, particularly for a book of its size and price. The typesetting and design are audacious and effective, even by White Wolf standards, although there are isolated spots when excessive backscreens and reversed type make the text a bit hard to read. But that's a quibble. The Book of Nod is the real deal for Vampire players everywhere."

== Reviews ==
- Envoyer #7
