= Liber des Goules: The Book of Ghouls =

1997 role-playing game supplement

Liber des Goules: The Book of Ghouls is a 1997 role-playing game supplement published by White Wolf Publishing for Mind's Eye Theatre.

== Contents ==
Liber des Goules: The Book of Ghouls is a supplement in which the focus is on ghouls—humans or animals empowered by vampire blood without being fully drained. These beings retain certain vampiric abilities while avoiding key vulnerabilities, such as sunlight sensitivity, making them valuable allies. The book provides comprehensive rules for ghoul character creation and guidance for incorporating them into stories. It breaks down various ghoul types, offers narrative strategies, and includes an appendix on animal ghouls.

== Reception ==
Andy Butcher reviewed Liber des Goules: The Book of Ghouls for Arcane magazine, rating it a 7 out of 10 overall, and stated that "Liber des Goules achieves what it sets out to do with admirable ease. Not only does it help to make ghouls both interesting and challenging to play, it also highlights the roles these creatures can play in a variety of different types of adventure. If you're a keen player or referee of The Masquerade looking for something a little different to add to your games, this is a must."

== Reviews ==
- Backstab #2
