= Ravener =

Ravener may refer to:

- Ravener, a bird of prey
- Ravener, someone who preys or plunders
- Raveners, game characters from Warhammer 40,000, see Tyranids
- Raveners, role-playing game characters from Demon: The Fallen
