= Book of Storyteller Secrets =

Role-playing game supplement

Book of Storyteller Secrets is a supplement published by White Wolf Publishing in 1997 for the horror role-playing game Vampire: The Dark Ages.

== Contents ==
Book of Storyteller Secrets is a supplement that serves as a guide to the Dark Ages setting, and provides tips for Storytellers running the game. The book also lists the rules for crossovers between various role-playing games in the World of Darkness series, and describes the Dauntains Psychiatric Clinic. A sample scenario, "The Don Quixote Syndrome", can be played with pregenerated characters. The book also includes a cardstock gamemaster's screen.

== Publication history ==
White Wolf originally published the modern-day horror role-playing game Vampire: The Masquerade in 1991. Five years later, in 1996 White Wolf released a medieval spin-off game Vampire: The Dark Ages. The supplement Book of Storyteller Secrets was published the following year, a 64-page softcover book with a cardstock gamemaster's screen designed by Deird'Re M. Brooks and Ian Lemke, with illustrations by Henry Higginbotham, Brian J. LeBlanc, and Richard Thomas.

Two years earlier, in 1995, White Wolf had published the identically titled but unrelated Book of Storyteller Secrets for another World of Darkness game, Changeling: The Dreaming.

== Reception ==
In Issue 11 of Arcane, Mark Barter saw several good elements in this book, but felt it didn't go far enough, saying, "There's a lot here to inspire the Storyteller, but not enough to run a campaign. It's good as far as it goes, but lacks depth." He concluded by giving it an average rating of 7 out of 10.

== Other reviews ==
- Backstab #5 (Sep-Oct 1997) p. 41
- Casus Belli V1 #108 (Sep 1997) p. 14
- Shadis #28 (1996) p. 90
