= Libellus Sanguinis =

Line of tabletop role-playing game sourcebooks

- Cover art for the first book
- Type: Tabletop role-playing game supplements
- Publisher: White Wolf Publishing
- First release: Libellus Sanguinis 1: Masters of the State; 1997
- Latest release: Libellus Sanguinis 4: Thieves in the Night; 2001
- Parent series: World of Darkness

Libellus Sanguinis is a line of four tabletop role-playing game supplements released by White Wolf Publishing in 1997–2001, for use with their game Vampire: The Dark Ages. The line includes Masters of the State (1997), Keepers of the Word (1998), Wolves at the Door (2000), and Thieves in the Night (2001).

== Contents ==
The Libellus Sanguinis line consists of four sourcebooks intended to be used with the tabletop role-playing game Vampire: The Dark Ages. They each describe three of the vampire clans in the setting, as they appeared in medieval times.

- Libellus Sanguinis 1: Masters of the State was released in September 1997, and covers the three vampire noble clans: Lasombra, Tzimisce, and Ventrue.
- Libellus Sanguinis 2: Keepers of the Word was released in October–December 1998, and covers the clans Brujah, Toreador, and Tremere.
- Libellus Sanguinis 3: Wolves at the Door was released in 2000, and covers the clans Assamite, Gangrel, and Followers of Set.
- Libellus Sanguinis 4: Thieves in the Night was released in December 2001, and covers the clans Malkavian, Nosferatu, and Ravnos.

== Reviews ==
- Dragon #247
- Backstab #6
- Backstab #14 (Libellus Sanguinis 2: Keepers of the Word)
- SF Site
