= The Masquerade (role-playing game) =

1994 live action role-playing game published by White Wolf Publishing

- Publisher: White Wolf Publishing
- Publication date: 1994

The Masquerade is a 1994 live action role-playing game published by White Wolf Publishing.

== Publication history ==
Shannon Appelcline relates that "Besides their five RPGs, White Wolf also expanded the World of Darkness in another direction: live action roleplaying games, starting with the Vampire-focused Mind's Eye Theatre: The Masquerade (1993). Mark Rein•Hagen had been thinking about LARPs since Ars Magica, but this was the first time his ideas saw print." Appelcline explained that LARPs were disconnected from the tabeltop role-playing hobby for many years, but "That changed in the ’90s, a fact that many attribute to White Wolf ’s Mind's Eye Theatre LARP, The Masquerade (1994) — a Vampire-based live action game. Certainly, The Masquerade was wildly successful and introduced a whole new generation of players to the roleplaying community, including a much larger proportion of women than had been seen before."

The adventure The Elder's Revenge was published in 1995, and the sourcebook Liber des Goules: The Book of Ghouls was published in 1997.

== Reception ==
Roger Spendlove reviewed The Masquerade in White Wolf #37 (July/Aug., 1993), rating it a 4 out of 5 and stated that "Although Mind's Eye Theatre could be aimed at the general public (and perhaps future installments will be), The Masquerade will probably appeal only to experienced gamers. I'm looking forward to future installments! Science Fiction? Fantasy? Historical settings? The Mind's Eye Theatre system of interactive entertainment has great potential in any genre."

Derek Pearcy reviewed The Masquerade in Pyramid #4 (Nov./Dec., 1993), and stated that "Overall, the game was executed very well. The graphic design is consistent with the feel of previous Vampire products, and playing the game with the right people is a good experience. At conventions, where you can get several hundred people playing at once, all scheming and conniving, it can be exhilarating. And okay, so you don't like the rules? Like their rulebook says, don't use them."

== Reviews ==
- Shadis #28 (1996)
- Casus Belli V1 #78 (Nov-Dec 1993)
- Rollespilsmagasinet Fønix (Danish) (Issue 8 - May/June 1995)
