= Halaku =

Halaku may refer to:

- Hulagu Khan or Halaku Khan, Mongol ruler and grandson of Genghis Khan
  - Halaku (film), a 1956 Indian Hindi-language film about the ruler
- Halaku or Slayers, role-playing game characters from Demon: The Fallen
- Halaku, role-playing game character from Werewolf: The Forsaken
