= Victorian Age: Vampire =

Tabletop role-playing game

- Cover art
- Designers: Justin Achilli, Kraig Blackwelder, Brian Campbell, Will Hindmarch, Ari Marmell
- Illustrators: Mike Danza, Guy Davis, Rebecca Guay, Vince Locke, Matthew Mitchell, Christopher Shy, Richard Thomas, Andy Trabbold
- Publishers: White Wolf Publishing
- Publication: September 30, 2002
- Genres: Personal horror
- Systems: Storyteller System
- Series: World of Darkness
- ISBN: 1-58846-229-3

Victorian Age: Vampire is a tabletop role-playing game published by White Wolf Publishing on September 30, 2002. It is part of the World of Darkness series, and is based on the 1991 game Vampire: The Masquerade. Players take the roles of vampires existing in secrecy among humans, in 1880–1897, during the Victorian era. The setting is primarily focused on Europe, but also features locations including Africa, India, and the United States. The core book does not contain the full rules for the game, and so an additional rulebook is required, such as Vampire: The Masquerade Revised Edition or Dark Ages: Vampire.

The game was created by Justin Achilli, Kraig Blackwelder, Brian Campbell, Will Hindmarch, and Ari Marmell. It is themed around Gothic literature, and also features themes of British imperial oppression, sexual repression, social reform, and clashes between ideologies. It was produced as a one-off, and supported with two supplementary books. It has also been adapted into the live action role-playing game Vampire by Gaslight and a novel series by Philippe Boulle; characters from it also appear in the Vampire: The Masquerade supplement Fall of London. The game was critically well received for its historical setting.

== Overview ==
Victorian Age: Vampire is a tabletop role-playing game based on Vampire: The Masquerade, where players take the roles of vampires. It is set in 1880–1897, during the end of the Victorian era, with a focus on Europe; other featured locations include Africa, India, and the United States.

At this point in the setting, vampires no longer openly lord over humans, and live in hiding in cities and the countryside. Humans still have a remnant of belief in vampires: the notion of their existence is considered absurd in some circles, who still fear for vampires at night. Vampires in the setting are common, with around one vampire per 50,000 humans, particularly in Eastern Europe. Antagonists include witch hunters, the Inquisition, secret societies, sorcerers and witches, werewolves, fey, and ghosts.

The Victorian Age: Vampire rulebook does not contain complete rules, and as such the game requires another rulebook from the series to be played, such as Vampire: The Masquerade Revised Edition or Dark Ages: Vampire. Character creation is done with a character sheet, similarly to Vampire: The Masquerade, with some differences due to the time period; players choose attributes for their characters, and pick which of the thirteen vampire clans they will belong to. Games are led by storytellers, (Note: The person leading the game is called the "storyteller" in World of Darkness games, a role called "gamemaster" or "dungeon master" in other role-playing games.) and can be played either without dice or through comparing dice pools.

== Production and release ==
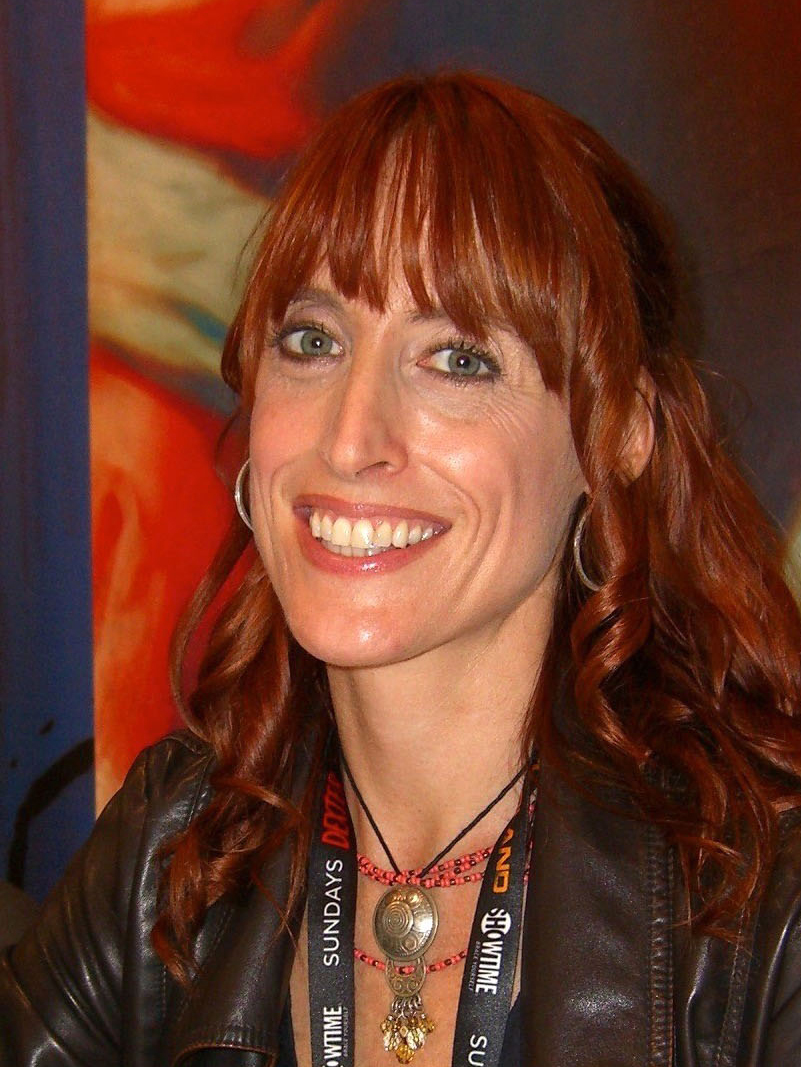
Several artists worked on the game, including Rebecca Guay.

Victorian Age: Vampire was created by Justin Achilli, Kraig Blackwelder, Brian Campbell, Will Hindmarch, and Ari Marmell, with art by Mike Danza, Guy Davis, Rebecca Guay, Vince Locke, Matthew Mitchell, Christopher Shy, Richard Thomas, and Andy Trabbold. It was produced as a one-off based on Vampire: The Masquerade, and is part of White Wolf Publishing's World of Darkness series. White Wolf had received requests to develop a vampire book set in the Victorian era ever since Vampire: The Masquerade first came out in 1991; Achilli commented that he did not know why it did not happen until 2002. While the series had largely been written from an American perspective until then, an effort was made to portray Victorian Age: Vampire from a British point of view, with London seen as the setting's "home town"; the United States was still featured in the game as many World of Darkness players were Americans. Coverage of Sub-Saharan Africa was intentionally kept vague, as Achilli also wanted to develop a game specifically about African vampires later on; this took the form of Kindred of the Ebony Kingdom in 2003.

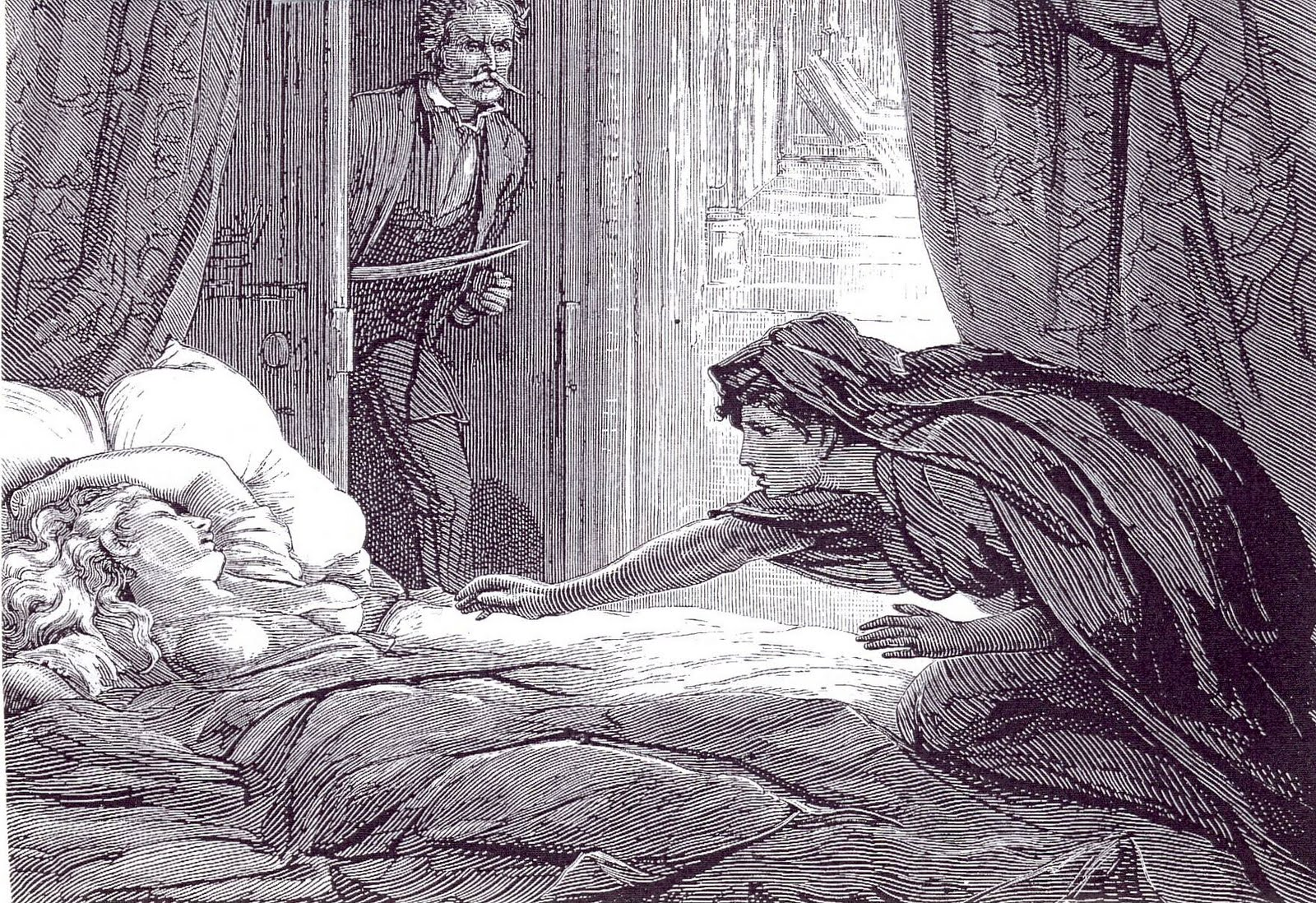
The production team referenced literary works including Sheridan Le Fanu's Carmilla.

The game was a return for the publisher to tabletop role-playing games with a historical setting, following 1996's Vampire: The Dark Ages, although the writers favored using literary conventions of the Victorian era as the basis for the game over actual history; literary works referenced in the production include Bram Stoker's Dracula, Sheridan Le Fanu's Carmilla, Frederick Cowles's The Vampire of Kaldenstein, Oscar Wilde's The Picture of Dorian Gray and Lady Windermere's Fan, Charles Dickens's Great Expectations, Charlotte Brontë's Jane Eyre, and George Eliot's Silas Marner. The "subtle supernatural" of Charles Palliser's The Unburied was specifically referenced for how Victorian vampires would act, and the game's homoerotic fiction prologue, "The Turning of Adam", referenced John William Polidori's "The Vampyre" for its style, to show the appeal of the setting.

The game was designed with a focus on mood over gameplay mechanics, with Gothic literature as the main theme; other themes include widespread British imperial oppression, violent and diplomatic social reform, and sexual repression. The setting was also themed around the clashes of opposing ideologies: science and faith, mysticism and established religion, desire and morality, and poverty and wealth. Seeing the Victorian era as a time of secret societies, Achilli also incorporated this in a focus on a clash between the vampiric sects the Sabbat and the Camarilla, with other groups like the Anarch Movement, while present, being more minor elements. Although vampires were still conceived of as individuals, vampire clans, as an effect of the era, were written as more monolithic than they are in Vampire: The Masquerade, with like-minded vampires grouping together in societies. To avoid repeating problems from Werewolf: The Wild West, where they had tried to cover a lot of information in little space, Achilli decided to set Victorian Age: Vampire in the narrower time frame of 1880–1897, rather than across the entirety of the Victorian era, ending at the real-world publication date of Dracula.

White Wolf Publishing released Victorian Age: Vampire on September 30, 2002, as a 224-page black-and-white book, and supported it with two supplements. In 2003, it was released in Portuguese in Brazil by Devir Livraria, and in French in France by Hexagonal.

=== Books ===
Victorian Age: Vampire game books
Title	Original release	ISBN	Publisher	Notes
Victorian Age: Vampire	September 30, 2002	1-58846-229-3	White Wolf Publishing	Core rulebook
London by Night	2002	1-58846-230-7	White Wolf Publishing	Sourcebook for London as portrayed in the setting
Victorian Age Companion	April 2003	1-58846-238-2	White Wolf Publishing	Sourcebook detailing bloodlines, technology, and vampire interests in human trends

== Reception ==
Reception
Review scores
Source	Rating
Casus Belli	4/6 stars
Dosdediez	4/5 stars

Pyramid enjoyed the game, designating it one of their "Pyramid Picks" in their review, and liked the game opportunities the setting gives, where both the vampiric Camarilla rule and British imperialism are at their highest. Dragão Brasil considered it a major release, and enjoyed getting to see another time period portrayed in the Vampire: The Masquerade setting after Vampire: The Dark Ages. Flames Rising thought that the game requires a lot of energy and creativity to keep the time-appropriate atmosphere going, and suggested that it might be therefore best suited for one-shots and short campaigns.

In November 2004, Hindmarch's work on Victorian Age: Vampire and Kindred of the Ebony Kingdom led to him getting the position of line developer of White Wolf Publishing's then-flagship game Vampire: The Requiem, succeeding Achilli.

== Related media ==
Vampire by Gaslight, an adaptation by Peter Woodworth for White Wolf Publishing's live action role-playing game Mind's Eye Theatre, was published in October 2003. A trilogy of novelizations was written by Philippe Boulle, consisting of A Morbid Initiation in 2002, and The Madness of Priests and The Wounded King in 2003. Sunset Empires, a Kindred of the East supplement for playing as Asian vampires in the Victorian Age: Vampire setting, was released in 2002. Some of the characters from Victorian Age: Vampire were used in the 2020 Vampire: The Masquerade supplement Fall of London, with updates to them for its 2012 setting.
