= Mind's Eye Theatre =

Live action role-playing game

The Masquerade
- 1st edition box cover, 1993
- Designers: Mark Rein·Hagen
- Publishers: White Wolf, By Night Studios
- Publication: 1993 1st edition (box); 1994 2nd edition (softcover)
- Genres: Horror live action role-playing game
- Systems: Rock, paper, scissors
- ISBN: 1565040678

Mind's Eye Theatre is a live action role-playing game (LARP) based on the White Wolf World of Darkness universe and shares the setting with the tabletop role-playing game Vampire: The Masquerade, among others.

In most editions of the game, conflicts and skill challenges involving random chance were settled with a "rock, paper, scissors" system often referred to as "throwing chops" or "hand jamming". In the 2005 release of Mind's Eye Theatre and Mind's Eye Theatre: The Requiem, this was removed in favor of a random card-draw mechanic to generate a random number between 1 and 10, usually using the Ace and 2 through 10 cards from a standard playing card deck. This mechanic was removed for the 2013 release of Mind's Eye Theatre: Vampire the Masquerade which returned to the rock, paper, scissors conflict resolution system from earlier editions.

The game possesses rules both for gameplay and player safety. An advantage of the live-action gameplay is the ability to use the real interactions of players to resolve the majority of encounters between player characters and non-player characters.

In 1999, Pyramid magazine named Mind's Eye Theatre (first edition) as one of the Millennium's Best Games. Editor Scott Haring said "Mind's Eye Theater was the first to take an established pen-and-paper RPG and do the translation to live-action. And it is easily the most successful live-action game, too."

In 2004, White Wolf published Laws of Judgment as part of the Time of Judgment product line. This volume was intended to bring the current storyline that began with the publication of Vampire: The Masquerade in 1993 to a close and a new chronicle would begin with the release of World of Darkness and Vampire: The Requiem in August 2004. Mind's Eye Theatre and Mind's Eye Theatre: The Requiem would bring the new setting into live action in July 2005.

In 2013, By Night Studios acquired the license for the Mind's Eye Theatre product line from CCP Games and in June 2013, Mind's Eye Theatre: Vampire the Masquerade was published, returning to the original, or "classic", World of Darkness setting. This was later followed by Mind's Eye Theatre: Werewolf: The Apocalypse in 2016 and Changeling: The Dreaming in 2020. Reviews for Minds Eye Theatre: Changeling the Dreaming indicated that it contained "fresh ideas" and that it ''is a supernatural enthusiast's dream game".

As of March 2021, By Night Studios launched a free online System Reference Document (SRD) containing the majority of the rules, mechanics, and fiction from their Vampire: The Masquerade line of products.

In May 2023, By Night Studios launched a crowd-funding campaign for a new version of Laws of the Night which would feature updated rules and settings based on Vampire the Masquerade, Fifth Edition. A PDF version of the new book was published in September 2023, with a physical release expected in 2024.

== Publications ==
- Mind's Eye Theatre: The Masquerade, Mark Rein·Hagen (1993)
- Mind's Eye Theatre: Book of the Damned (1993)
- The Book of Props (1994)
- Mind's Eye Theatre: The Apocalypse (1994, based on Werewolf: The Apocalypse)
- Mind's Eye Theatre: The Masquerade Player's Kit (1994)
- The Masquerade, Second Edition (1994)
- Antagonists (1995)
- Mind's Eye Theatre: The Elder's Revenge Playbook, Jennifer Donaldson, John Flournoy (1995)
- The Prince's Primer (1995)
- Mind's Eye Theatre: Laws of the Night, Richard E. Dansky, Beth Fischi, et al. (1996, formerly The Masquerade)
- Oblivion (1996, based on Wraith: The Oblivion)
- Liber des Ghouls: The Books of Ghouls (1997)
- Laws of the Wild (1997, based on Werewolf: the Apocalypse, Second Edition)
- The Long Night (1997, based on Vampire: The Dark Ages)
- Laws of the Hunt (1998, focusing on mortals as characters)
- The Shining Host (1998, based on Changeling: The Dreaming)
- Laws of Elysium (1998)
- Mind's Eye Theatre Journal (8 issues, 1999–2001)
- Laws of the Wyld West (1999, based on Werewolf: The Wild West)
- Laws of the Hunt: Player's Guide (1999)
- Laws of the Night, Revised Edition (1999)
- Laws of the East (2000, based on Kindred of the East)
- Laws of the Night: Camarilla Guide (2000)
- Laws of the Night: Sabbat Guide (2000)
- Laws of the Wild: Changing Breeds 1 (2000)
- Laws of the Night: Storyteller's Guide (2000)
- Laws of Ascension (2001, based on Mage: The Ascension)
- Laws of the Wild, Revised Edition (2001)
- Laws of the Wild: Changing Breeds 2 (2001)
- Mind's Eye Theatre: Book of the Wyrm (2001)
- The Shining Host: Player's Guide (2001)
- Laws of the Hunt, Revised Edition (2002)
- Laws of Ascension Companion (2002)
- Laws of the Wild: Changing Breeds 3 (2002)
- Laws of Resurrection (2002, based on Mummy: The Resurrection)
- Hengeyokai: Way of the Beast Courts (2002)
- Laws of the Reckoning (2003, based on Hunter: The Reckoning)
- Faith and Fire (2003, based on Dark Ages: Vampire)
- Laws of the Night: Anarch Guide (2003)
- Vampire by Gaslight (2003, based on Victorian Age: Vampire)
- Laws of Judgment (2004, based on Time of Judgment)
- Mind's Eye Theatre Core Rulebook (July 2005, based on World of Darkness)
- Mind's Eye Theatre: The Requiem (July 2005, based on Vampire: The Requiem)
- Mind's Eye Theatre: The Awakening (August 2007, based on Mage: The Awakening)
- City in the Sand (July 2009, PDF only)
- Mind's Eye Theatre: Vampire: the Masquerade, By Night Studios (December 2013)
- Mind's Eye Theatre: Blood and Betrayal (2015)
- Mind's Eye Theatre: Pickering Lythe (2015)
- Mind's Eye Theatre: Werewolf: The Apocalypse, By Night Studios (October 2016)
- Mind's Eye Theatre: Vampire: the Masquerade Volume II: Issue 1, By Night Studios
- Mind's Eye Theatre: Changeling: The Dreaming, By Night Studios (2020)
- Mind's Eye Theatre: Vampire: the Masquerade Volume 2, By Night Studios (2021)
- Mind's Eye Theatre: Vampire: the Masquerade: War of Ages (2023)
- Mind's Eye Theatre: Laws of the Night V5, By Night Studios (September 2023, based on Vampire: the Masquerade, Fifth Edition)
