= Werewolf: The Wild West =

Tabletop role-playing game

- Werewolf: The Wild West cover
- Designers: Justin Achilli, Ethan Skemp
- Publishers: White Wolf Publishing (WTWW); Onyx Path Publishing (WWEP)
- Publication: Werewolf: The Wild West; May 30, 1997; Wyld West Expansion Pack; June 27, 2014
- Genres: Weird West
- Systems: Storyteller System
- Series: World of Darkness

Werewolf: The Wild West is a tabletop role-playing game in the World of Darkness series, published by White Wolf Publishing on May 30, 1997. It is a spin-off from their 1992 game Werewolf: The Apocalypse, and is set in the Wild West in the 19th century. Players take the roles of werewolves, warring to defending the Pure Lands (the Americas) from corruption in the form of the mighty Bane called the Storm-Eater.

== Overview ==
Werewolf: The Wild West is a tabletop role-playing game in the Weird West genre, where players take the roles of werewolves of various tribes and battle both internally and against the Bane spirit the Storm-Eater's minions. The game uses the Storyteller System.

== Production ==
Werewolf: The Wild West was designed by Justin Achilli and Ethan Skemp, and was conceived as a "savage West" interpretation of the earlier World of Darkness game Werewolf: The Apocalypse, following publisher White Wolf Publishing's model of historical role-playing games based on previous games in the series; the other two were Vampire: The Dark Ages (1996) and Mage: The Sorcerers Crusade (1998). Out of these, only Vampire: The Dark Ages performed well commercially, and so Werewolf: The Wild West was moved to White Wolf Publishing's lower-budget imprint Arthaus in 1998, but it still remained commercially unsuccessful. In 2014, Onyx Path Publishing released Wyld West Expansion Pack, which ports the game to the 20th Anniversary Edition of Werewolf: The Apocalypse.

=== Books ===
Werewolf: The Wild West game books
| Title | Original release | ISBN | Publisher | Notes |
|---|---|---|---|---|
| Werewolf: The Wild West | May 30, 1997 | 1-56504-340-5 | White Wolf Publishing | Core rulebook |
| Frontier Secrets | August 1997 | 1-56504-341-3 | White Wolf Publishing | Sourcebook for gifts, breed variants, and antagonists. Released in a bundle with a referee screen. |
| Under a Harrowed Moon: Strange Bedfellows | February–April 1998 | 1-889546-16-X | Pinnacle Entertainment Group | Adventure module. First in a series of crossovers with Pinnacle Entertainment Group's role-playing game Deadlands. |
| Under a Harrowed Moon: Savage Passage | February–May 1998 | 1-889546-16-X | Pinnacle Entertainment Group | Adventure module. Second in a series of crossovers with Pinnacle Entertainment Group's role-playing game Deadlands. |
| Ghost Towns | April 1998 | 1-56504-343-X | White Wolf Publishing | Sourcebook for ghost towns. Crossover with Wraith: The Oblivion. |
| The Wild West Companion | August 1998 | 1-56504-344-8 | White Wolf Publishing | Guide to the game, detailing the setting and expanding on game mechanics |
| Tales from the Trails: Mexico | 1999 | 1-56504-345-6 | White Wolf Publishing | Sourcebook for Mexico |
| Wyld West Expansion Pack | June 27, 2014 | —N/a | Onyx Path Publishing | Book porting Werewolf: The Wild West to Werewolf: The Apocalypse 20th Anniversary Edition |

== Reception and legacy ==
Reception
Review scores
| Source | Rating |
|---|---|
| Backstab | 7/10 (newcomers); 2/10 (WTA players) |

Backstab recommended the game for players new to the series, but thought it did not bring enough originality for players who had previously played Werewolf: The Apocalypse.

Retrospectively, Achilli considered it a mistake to have tried to cover as big of a time period as they had in Werewolf: The Wild West. This influenced the development of the 2002 game Victorian Age: Vampire, which rather than taking place across the entirety of the Victorian era was limited to 1880–1897.

== Reviews ==
- Dragão Brasil #30

== Related media ==
A deck of Werewolf: The Wild West poker cards was released simultaneously with the game on May 30, 1997. Laws of the Wyld West, a live-action role-playing game adaptation for White Wolf Publishing's game Mind's Eye Theatre, was released in 1999.
