= Dark Ages: Werewolf =

Supplementary role-playing book published by White Wolf, Inc

- Dark Ages: Werewolf cover
- Publishers: White Wolf
- Publication: 2003
- Genres: Personal Horror
- Systems: Storyteller System

Dark Ages: Werewolf is a supplementary role-playing book published by White Wolf, Inc.

== History ==
White Wolf resumed publishing historical role-playing games in 2002, and relaunched Dark Ages: Vampire (2002) as a core rulebook; supplements were added for the other magical groups of the World of Darkness, and each of these was dependent upon Dark Ages: Vampire to play, including Dark Ages: Werewolf (2003).

== Description ==
The Dark Ages: Werewolf supplement allows gamers to run scenarios for the Werewolf system in medieval Europe (circa 1230 AD).

== Publication information ==
- Published in 2003, 2nd Edition Print. Hardback. White wolf Catalogue Number: WW20005 ISBN 1-58846-284-6, 232 pages. Original Game concept credited to Mark Rein·Hagen.
