= Ghouls: Fatal Addiction =

1997 supplement for Vampire: The Masquerade

- Cover art by Guy Davis and Vince Locke
- Designers: Robert Hatch
- Illustrators: Guy Davis; Vince Locke
- Writers: Ronni Radner; Ethan Skemp
- Publishers: White Wolf Publishing
- Publication: June–July 1997
- Genres: Tabletop role-playing game supplement
- Parent games: Vampire: The Masquerade
- Series: World of Darkness
- ISBN: 1-56504-230-1

Ghouls: Fatal Addiction is a tabletop role-playing game supplement published by White Wolf Publishing in June–July 1997 for their game Vampire: The Masquerade.

== Contents ==
Ghouls: Fatal Addiction describes how to develop and play characters who are ghouls, creatures who are half-way between mortal and vampire after being fed vampiric blood. This gives them longevity and new powers, but the blood also becomes an addiction that enslaves ghouls as servants of the vampires. The book is divided into an introductory short story, "Blood is Thicker", and six chapters:

1. The First Taste: Introduction
2. A Clockwork Crimson: The physiology of ghouls
3. Master & Servants: The social relationship of ghouls and vampires
4. Character Creation: How to create a ghoul character
5. Storytelling: Tips for Storytellers
6. Templates: Four character archetypes

== Production ==
Ghouls: Fatal Addiction was developed by Robert Hatch, and written by Ronnie Radner and Ethan Skemp. The art direction was handled by Lawrence Snelly, while the interior and cover art was drawn by Guy Davis and Vince Locke.

The book was released by White Wolf Publishing in June–July 1997 as a 120-page softcover book, and has since also been released as an ebook.

== Reception ==
Rick Swan of Dragon commented "obviously this isn't for the fainthearted, and it certainly isn't for kiddies. But if you’re a lover of the grotesque, you’ll find this as titillating as cuddling up to a fresh corpse."

== Reviews ==
- Backstab No. 4 (Jul–Aug 1997)
- Casus Belli V1 No. 107 (Jul–Aug 1997)
- Dragão Brasil No. 30 (Sep 1997)
