= Sam Chupp =

American tabletop role-playing game designer

- Known for: Tabletop game designer
- Notable work: Wraith: the Oblivion

Sam Chupp is a tabletop game designer from the United States.

== Career ==
Sam Chupp is the co-creator of the roleplaying games Wraith: the Oblivion (1994) and Changeling: The Dreaming (1995). Chupp was the Special Guest at the Marmalade Dog Gamefest II in 1995. He also wrote the religious biblical verse in the best-selling art book called The Book of Nod. He won an Origins Award in 2003 for "Best Game Aid Or Accessory" for his work on Gamemastering Secrets by Grey Ghost Press. He lives in Atlanta, Georgia.

== Books ==
- Sins of the Fathers, HarperCollins ISBN 0061054720

== Literature references ==
- The Essential Guide to Werewolf Literature by Brian J. Frost

Published by University of Wisconsin Press, 2003 Original from the University of California ISBN 0879728590, 9780879728595
