= Deliria =

Tabletop role-playing game

Faerie Tales for a New Millennium
- Cover
- Designers: Phil Brucato
- Publishers: Laughing Pan Productions
- Publication: 2003
- Genres: Urban fantasy
- Systems: Compact System

Deliria: Faerie Tales for a New Millennium is an "interactive urban fantasy setting" created by Phil Brucato. The title refers to an altered state of awareness in which several levels of reality can be perceived at once, to both good and ill effect.

The core concept behind Deliria is one of "ordinary people in an extraordinary world." Inspired by classical fairy tales and urban fantasy, the setting presents a multicultural world in which magic is always present but often invisible. To "twilight people" who encounter the magical realm, the world becomes a frightening yet wonderful place. Meanwhile, the immortal faeries, or aelderfolk, regard mortal humanity with a mixture of awe and terror. The accelerating pace of human imagination reverberates through both worlds, bringing changes that many aelders fear. Within the tensions of this setting, ordinary people become heroes - or villains - in their own new fairy tales.

Inspired by authors like Charles de Lint, Erik Davis and Francesca Lia Block, films like Edward Scissorhands and Practical Magic, world music and ethereal wave music, and TV shows like Buffy the Vampire Slayer, Deliria's setting emphasizes "normal people" over superheroes. As a role-playing game, it features a flexible rules system, collaborative storytelling, and a character-crafting process based on telling stories about the character. Deliria has also been noted for its vivid digital art, evocative short stories, and emphasis of "courage rather than carnage."

== Non-hero characters ==
The player characters are not meant to be heroes in the classical sense. Characters are not elite fighters or wizards, super-soldiers or super-criminals. Normal people, who live through an (perhaps even the) adventure of their lives, are the heroes in a Deliria Campaign. "Courage rather than carnage" means that the possibilities of the characters should only limited by their players' imagination, not by stats like hitpoints or class levels.

== Scalable rule-system ==
Deliria's game system is designed to be used at three levels of complexity, depending on the wishes of the group. "Flexible" rather than "crunchy," it's versatile enough to support almost any form of roleplaying, given the powers of imagination and creativity on the player's and the guide's behalf.

The core of the system is summed up as: Challenge, Prowess, Chance, Result. To resolve a Challenge, the player checks her character's Prowess. If necessary, she takes a Chance that may add to or subtract from that Prowess. Success or failure is the Result, which is then described in "story elements" - that is, narrative rather than mathematical terms.

Chances are resolved through two ten-sided dice, a deck of cards, or a computer program (sold with the main rule book).

=== Narrative rules ===
The very simple rules that encourages narrative solutions of contests and reduces random challenges to a minimum. Characters are described through abstract key traits as well as narrative elements. This level of complexity reflects a Storytelling approach.

This level is proposed for Computer-assisted or Live action role-playing games.

=== Simple rules ===
Slightly more detailed rules feature an in-between solution. This option uses contest solutions through dice rolling or card drawing only when it's important and, if necessary, also modifiers and counterdraws.

This level is proposed for pen and paper or Live action role-playing games.

=== Advanced rules ===
Every significant action is resolved through a random challenge and many rules (and optional rules) can be used to handle special situations.

This level is proposed for only for pen and paper games.

== Publication history ==
Though now out of print, the game was also bundled with a CD/ROM that had sound effects and music. A pdf patch was released to clear up a few rules.

- Deliria - Core Book (2003)
- Everyday Heroes: Adventures for the Rest of Us (2006)
- Goblin Markets - The Glitter Trade (2011)
