= World of Darkness: Hong Kong =

World of Darkness: Hong Kong is a 1998 role-playing game adventure published by White Wolf Publishing for Vampire: The Masquerade.

== Contents ==
World of Darkness: Hong Kong is a supplement which details the history and geography of Hong Kong and its inhabitants.

== Reviews ==
- InQuest Gamer #39
- Backstab #9 (May-Jun 1998) p. 54
- Casus Belli V1 #114 (Jun-Jul 1998) p. 20
- Dragão Brasil #30 (Sep 1997) p. 5
- Dragão Brasil #40 (Jul 1998) p. 2
- Dosdediez V2 #14 (Jun 2000) p. 19
- Lider V3 #5 (Jun 2000) p. 11
