= World of Darkness: Midnight Circus =

World of Darkness: Midnight Circus is a 1996 role-playing game supplement published by White Wolf Publishing for World of Darkness.

== Contents ==
World of Darkness: Midnight Circus is a supplement in which characters from the five major World of Darkness game lines can interact within a shared backdrop. It centers on a mysterious traveling circus, detailed and conveyed through fragments of folklore, myths, and historical clippings. These in-character documents serve both as mood-setting tools and as gradual reveal mechanics for the players. The sourcebook dives deep into the Circus's inhabitants—from ordinary workers and trapped performers to the malevolent Infernal Trinity who secretly govern the spectacle. It explores both the physical layout of the Big Top and its sideshows, as well as the metaphysical forces behind the Circus's sinister glamour. Thematically, it leans into misdirection and haunting introspection, evoking strong echoes of Something Wicked This Way Comes, which the authors openly cite as inspiration. Mechanically, it offers guidance on cross-game integration, especially regarding the rationale for disparate supernatural beings cooperating. It includes one major adventure—The Waste Land. The appendix suggests how to run a circus-based chronicle.

== Reception ==
Mark Barter reviewed World of Darkness: Midnight Circus for Arcane magazine, rating it a 7 out of 10 overall, and stated that "There's nothing startlingly original here, but all the old clichés are given enough of a twist to make them interesting. The emphasis is on illusion and misdirection as much as confrontation, which may frustrate some players. It is more likely to work for groups that enjoy investigation and roleplaying than those who like to break heads, and is better suited for experienced and powerful characters. I'd be more inclined to use it as a grab-bag of ideas and colourful characters than as a campaign, however your players may have more of a taste for the Circus than mine."

== Reviews ==
- Envoyer (Issue 3 - Jan 1997)
- Ringbote (Issue 13 - Jul/Aug 1997)
- Dragão Brasil #25 (Apr 1997) p. 38-39
- Shadis #30 p. 93
