= Marmalade Dog =

Gaming convention in Michigan, United States

- Genre: Gaming
- Venue: Western Michigan University
- Locations: Kalamazoo, Michigan
- Country: United States
- Organizer: Western Michigan Gamers Guild

Marmalade Dog is an annual gaming convention operated by the Western Michigan Gamers Guild (WMGG) and held on the campus of Western Michigan University in Kalamazoo, Michigan each spring.

Marmalade Dog is traditionally held in The Bernhard Center (WMU's student union). Exceptions to this were in 1999 (Sangren Hall), 2002 (Ellsworth Cafeteria) and 2006 (Student Recreation Center).

== Name ==
The distinctive name for the convention was given a brief explanation in the 1994 pre-registration book:

Marmalade is the name of this convention's mascot, who happens to be a rather shaggy-looking, part sheep dog, part everything else, mutt who has an affinity for Viking helmets and ammunition belts. We like to think of him as the ultimate embodiment of the universal gamer.

— Western Michigan Gamers Guild, Marmalade Dog Gamefest 94

The name was actually suggested by John Zimmerman (Guild Librarian around the time of the first Marmalade Dog):

The name, I remember, came from John, and he just reminded me that it was almost shot down at the time. It was the name of an (almost) band of a friend of ours, Jason Priess.

— Kevin Wixson, Kalamazoo D&D Meetup Message Board

Prior to 1994 the WMGG was known as the "Western Area Role-Players" and the convention called "WARPCon".

== Logos ==
The original Marmalade Dog logo was also created by John Zimmerman. This illustration was used to brand and promote Marmalade Dog up to and including the 1999 convention. It was at this convention (Marmalade Dog 4) that professional fantasy artist Jeff Easley drew a rendition of Marmalade Dog which he gave to the WMGG.

While the Easley illustration did become the new "official" Marmalade Dog, the classic logo was still used on some convention materials until 2001 and after that on certain WMGG materials. Most recently the Zimmerman dog was used as a repeating pattern on the WMGG photo ID membership cards issued 2005–present.

A new vision of Marmalade Dog has been created for nearly every convention since Marmalade Dog II, however it was not until Mia Paluzzi's illustration for Marmalade Dog 7 in 2002 that all convention materials (web site, books, badges, T-shirts, etc.) began to exclusively use the annually changing image.

== Timeline ==
1994

- Marmalade Dog: Gamefest 94, January 15–16, Special Guests: Troy Denning and Greg Costikyan

1995

- Marmalade Dog Gamefest II, October 1–2, Special Guest: Sam Chupp

1996

- Marmalade Dog III Gamefest, March 9–10, Special Guest: Bill Slavicsek.

1999

- Marmalade Dog 4, March 27, Special Guest: Jeff Easley

2000

- Marmalade Dog 5 Gamefest, April 1, Special Guest: Tom Wham

2001

- Marmalade Dog 6: Gamefest 2001, March 31 - April 1

2002

- Marmalade Dog 7: Gamefest 2002, March 23–24

2003

- Marmalade Dog 8: Gamefest 2003, March 29–30

2004

- Marmalade Dog 9: Gamefest 2004, April 2–4

2005

- Marmalade Dog 10: Gamefest 2005, March 11–13

2006

- Marmalade Dog 11, March 24–26

2007

- Marmalade Dog 12, March 16–18

2008

- Marmalade Dog 13, March 28–30

2009

- Marmalade Dog 14, January 30 - February 1

2010

- Marmalade Dog 15, March 26–28

2011

- Marmalade Dog 16, April 15–17

2012

- Marmalade Dog 17, February 24–26

2013

- Marmalade Dog 18, February 8–10

2014

- Marmalade Dog 19, February 7–9

2015

- Marmalade Dog 20, February 6–8

2016

- Marmalade Dog 21, March 18–20

2017

- Marmalade Dog 22, March 24–26

2018

- Marmalade Dog 23, March 30 - April 1

2019

- Marmalade Dog 24, February 22–24

2022

- Marmalade Dog 25, March 11–13
