= The Elder's Revenge =

Live action horror role-playing game supplement

Playbook
- Designers: Jennifer Donaldson; John Flournoy
- Publishers: White Wolf Publishing
- Publication: 1995; 31 years ago
- Genres: Horror
- Systems: Rock, paper, scissors
- ISBN: 978-1565045033

The Elder's Revenge is an adventure published by White Wolf Publishing in 1995 for the horror live-action role-playing game Mind's Eye Theatre.

== Plot summary ==
The Elder's Revenge is an adventure written by Jennifer Donaldson and John Flournoy for the Mind's Eye Theatre live-action role-playing game, itself a spinoff of the table-top horror role-playing game Vampire: The Masquerade.

The adventure, which takes the form of a dramatic script, involves the play, The Prince, and the script contains production notes and stage directions. Numerous props such as letters, lyrics and newspaper clippings are included.

A full-scale production of the script requires seven principal actors and eight supporting actor/dancers.

== Reception ==
In the August 1996 edition of Dragon (Issue #232), Rick Swan thought that given the large cast, the play should be produced by a college drama department rather than a band of role-players: "Better Elder's Revenge than an umteenth revival of Bye Bye Birdie.
