= Adam Tinworth =

British role-playing game designer and journalist

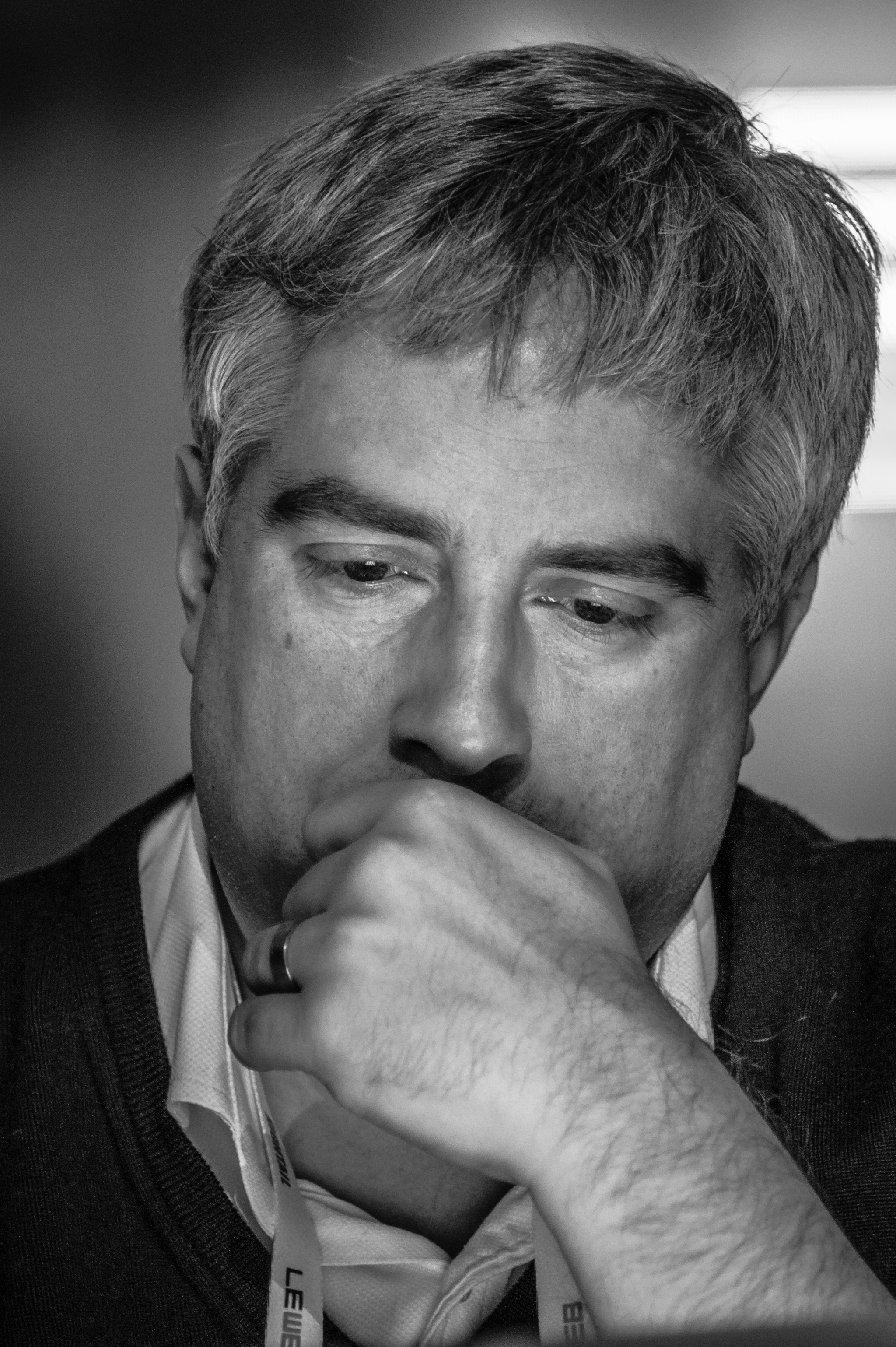
- Adam Tinworth
- Born: Adam Matthew J. Tinworth; 6 November 1971 (age 54); Stockport, England
- Occupations: Consultant, journalist, writer
- Writing career
- Language: English
- Years active: 1999–2007 (as a Role-playing game designer and writer)
- Notable awards: FRSA
- Website: onemanandhisblog.com

Adam Matthew J. Tinworth (born 6 November 1971) is a journalist and writer who co-authored two major role-playing games, Demon: The Fallen and Werewolf: The Forsaken from White Wolf Publishing. He was also an extensive contributor to Hunter: The Reckoning, a game line that was subsequently ported to video games.

Since around 2005, he has become known as a commenter and analyst of digital journalism and social media. The Guardian covered his dispute with the National Union of Journalists over the role of bloggers in the news ecosystem, and has extensively referenced his work.

== Career ==
Adam Tinworth began his journalistic career by working on student magazines at Imperial College, London and Queen Mary, University of London. He has written the long-running journalism blog One Man & His Blog since 2003.

His blogging was first written about in the press during the 7 July 2005 London bombings, and was widely cited as an example of citizen journalism - ironically, as he was a working journalist at the time. By 2009 his site was described by The Guardian as a prominent blog, alongside publications like Paul Staines' Guido Fawkes.

His blogging work led to him being appointed blogging editor for Reed Business Information, leading a push by the business-to-business publisher into blogs. Previously, he was features editor of Estates Gazette, a weekly business magazine for the UK commercial real estate industry.

Tinworth has become known as a commenter, writer and analyst of digital media and its inter-relationship with journalism. His work initially was in the trade press, but expanded later to cover wider issues in more general forms of journalism. His work was quoted in The Guardian regularly during the late 2000s, presenting his comments on areas including journalistic blogging and the rise of paywalls.

In recent years, he has participated in evolving business models for online publishers. He has also participated in the debate around "fake news", and been interviewed, in his role as a journalism lecturer at City, University of London, on social media's role in its spread. He is regularly interviewed by trade sites for journalists.

While no longer a working journalist, he occasionally breaks stories like the closing of Friends Reunited, and the arrival of a new Kindle typeface.

Tinworth's work has been quoted in books, media articles and academic papers about digital journalism. He is one of the panel that contributes to the annual Reuters Institute study Journalism, Media, and Technology Trends and Predictions.

=== Controversies ===
Tinworth was criticised for taking non-traditional journalistic positions during a dispute with the National Union of Journalists, and debates about the future of journalism careers with journalism writer and academic Roy Greenslade.

== Role-playing games ==
In parallel to his journalism career, he began writing about RPGs for the British magazine Arcane. He has contributed to over 25 role-playing game books for White Wolf Game Studio, including Werewolf: The Forsaken and Demon: The Fallen, as well as two for Onyx Path.

=== Author credits ===
==== Role-playing games ====
- Werewolf: The Forsaken
- Dark Ages: Inquisitor
- Demon: The Fallen

Hunter: The Reckoning

- Hunter Book: Wayward
- Hunter: The Moonstruck
- Hunter Players Guide
- Hunter Storytellers Handbook
- Hunter Book: Innocent
- The Walking Dead
- Hunter: The Infernal
- Hunter Book: Visionary

Other supplements which Adam Tinworth has co-authored include: (all White Wolf Game Studio publications)

- Lodges: the Faithful
- Savant and Sorcerer
- World of Darkness: Ghost Stories
- Damned and Deceived
- Dark Ages: British Isles
- Houses of the Fallen
- Players Guide to Garou
- Shadow Games
- Tribebook: Silver Fangs, Revised Ed.
- Vampire Players Guide
- Victorian Age: Vampire Companion
- Dark Ages: Vampire
- London by Night
- Tribebook: Fianna, Revised Ed.
- Werewolf Storytellers Handbook, Revised Ed.
- Exalted Storyteller's Companion
- Veil of Night
- A World of Rage
- World of Darkness: Blood-Dimmed Tides

(All Onyx Path)

- Guildhalls of the Deathless
- Hunter: Mortal Remains

==== Fiction ====
- Lucifer's Shadow
