= Mage: The Sorcerers Crusade =

Tabletop role-playing game

- Cover art
- Designers: Phil Brucato; Rachelle Udell
- Publishers: White Wolf Publishing
- Publication: 1998
- Genres: Modern Mysticism
- Systems: Storyteller System
- Series: World of Darkness
- ISBN: 1-56504-625-0

Mage: The Sorcerers Crusade is a tabletop role-playing game published by White Wolf Publishing in 1998. It is part of the World of Darkness series, and is a spin-off from Mage: The Ascension. Set during the Renaissance, it depicts the beginning of the struggle between "traditionalists" and "technocrats".

== History ==
White Wolf Publishing came up with a new model for game releases as historical RPGs, with each of these new games based on one of the original games in the World of Darkness setting. Three new lines were published as a result: Vampire: The Dark Ages (1996), Werewolf: The Wild West (1997), Mage: The Sorcerers Crusade (1998) and Wraith: the Great War (1999).

== Reception ==
Although Mage: The Sorcerers Crusade was among the best selling role-playing games in France in the July–August 1998 period, it and the other most recent World of Darkness games at the time, with the exception of Vampire: The Dark Ages, were commercial failures, contributing to large economic problems for the publisher by 1998. White Wolf felt that they were unable to afford to continue publishing Mage: The Sorcerers Crusade, Changeling: The Dreaming, and Werewolf: The Wild West, so they were moved to White Wolf's new imprint Arthaus, where they could be produced on smaller budgets; there, Mage: The Sorcerers Crusade was able to succeed commercially.

== Reviews ==
- Backstab #9
- Casus Belli #114
- Realms of Fantasy
