= Dark Ages: Inquisitor =

Role-playing game supplement published by White Wolf, Inc.

- Dark Ages: Inquisitor cover
- Designers: Matthew McFarland, Emily K. Dresner-Thornber, Myranda Kalis, Anthony Ragan, Sarah Roark, C. A. Suleiman, Adam Tinworth, Janet Trautvetter
- Publishers: White Wolf
- Publication: September 1, 2002
- Systems: Storyteller System
- Parent games: Dark Ages: Vampire
- Series: World of Darkness

Dark Ages: Inquisitor is a supplement published by White Wolf, Inc. in 2002 for the horror role-playing game Dark Ages: Vampire

== History ==
In 1991, White Wolf created the horror role-playing game Vampire: The Masquerade set in the modern-day World of Darkness universe. This was followed in 1996 with a historical version, Dark Ages: Vampire, set in medieval France around the year 1230. When Dark Ages: Vampire was revised and updated in 2002, White Wolf also released a number of supplements for other groups of magical creatures, including Dark Ages: Inquisitor, a 237-page softcover book written by Emily K. Dresner-Thornber, Myranda Kalis, Matthew McFarland, Anthony Ragan, Sarah Roark, Colin A. Suleiman, Adam Tinworth, and Janet Trautvetter. Artwork was provided by Jim DiBartolo, Marko Djurdjević, Eric Hotz, Becky Jollensten, Tom Mandrake, Rik Martin, Alex Sheikman, Adrian Smith, James Stowe, and Timothy Truman.

== Description ==
The book describes how players in Dark Ages: Vampire can create and play characters who are powerful members of a secret Shadow Inquisition, charged with discovering and destroying vampires and other "Get of Satan." The Inquisitor can be a member of one of five factions, each with special skills and magic.

Since many players of Dark Ages: Vampire join the game to play vampires and other non-human creatures, the Storyteller can alternatively use this book to create dangerous opponents who are actively seeking out the players in order to expose them and destroy them.

== Reception ==
Peter Holian was impressed by the abilities granted to Inquisitors that gave them the power to stand up to a vampire or witch, saying, "I quite like Dark Ages: Inquisitor." Holian did feel this should have been a stand-alone game, commenting, "I was extremely annoyed that you need Dark Ages: Vampire to be able to run a game, whether you want it or not, because only it contains the core rules." Holian concluded, "All in all, this game embodies (even if it appears otherwise) what all the [World of Darkness] games historically entailed."
