= Order of Hermes =

Order of Hermes may refer to:

- The Order of Hermes (Ars Magica), a fictional hermetic society of wizards in the role-playing game Ars Magica
- The Order of Hermes (Mage: The Ascension), the equivalent of the Ars Magica society in the role-playing game Mage: The Ascension
