= Dark Ages: Mage =

Role-playing game book

- Cover art
- Designers: Bill Bridges, Kraig Blackwelder, David Bolack, Stephen Michael Dipesa, Mur Lafferty, James Maliszewski, John Maurer, Tara Maurer, Matthew McFarland
- Publishers: White Wolf Publishing
- Publication: October 2002
- Systems: Storyteller System
- Parent games: Dark Ages: Vampire
- Series: World of Darkness
- ISBN: 1-58846-404-0

Dark Ages: Mage is a tabletop role-playing game supplement released by White Wolf Publishing in October 2002 for use with their game Dark Ages: Vampire, and is part of the World of Darkness series.

== History ==
White Wolf resumed publishing historical settings in 2002, by first relaunching Dark Ages: Vampire as a core rulebook, and then adding supplements for other supernatural groups, all of them dependent on Dark Ages: Vampire to play, including Dark Ages: Mage, which was released in October 2002 as a 240-page hardcover book, and later re-released as an e-book.

== Description ==
This book acts as a precursor to Mage: The Ascension. It is a wildly different system from the modern counterpart, as Paradox has not quite taken hold. Because the consensus of reality is less powerful, magic itself is more bold. Rather than magic commonly being explained away by coincidence, it is often obviously the working of some powerful being.
