= Demon: The Fallen =

2002 tabletop role-playing game

- Cover art
- Designers: Michael B. Lee (Line Developer), Steve Kenson, Lucien Soulban, Greg Stolze, Adam Tinworth, Pauline Benney (art director)
- Publishers: White Wolf Publishing
- Publication: November 2002
- Genres: Tabletop role-playing game
- Systems: Storyteller System
- Series: World of Darkness

Demon: The Fallen is a 2002 tabletop role-playing game released by White Wolf Publishing. Set in the World of Darkness, players take on the role of a demon - a fallen angel who descended to the Garden of Eden with Lucifer, only to be condemned to Hell after a long war with Heaven. The game focuses on "infernal glory" as its central theme for storytelling and character development - the acquisition of power to restore the Fallen's grace as well as to potentially reconnect with humanity, all the while staving off their own agony and evading monstrous demons.

== History ==
The War in Heaven began when an Elohim (angel) named Ahrimal, one of the Seers, foresaw a disaster in the future - a disaster which God had either directly orchestrated or would allow to happen. The Elohim debated whether or not to act against God in order to prevent this disaster; many argued that it would be safer to do nothing, because their action could potentially be the cause of the disaster. Lucifer, one of the Heralds as well as the first and greatest Elohim created by God, was the first to make a conclusive decision in favor of rebellion, and he became the leader of the rebel Elohim; the Fallen.

These Fallen revealed themselves to humanity in order to bring them the light of forbidden knowledge and awareness. In doing so they incurred the wrath of God, who had given humanity the potential to be aware of the Word, the good and evil, yet had not intended Man to have this kind of awareness yet. The humans, Adam, Eve and their descendants, had been given gifts that they could not use due to their initial innocence, and Adam and Eve are portrayed as having had only rudimentary knowledge and awareness, solely concerned with their survival. During the war that followed, the sin of Caine taught the Fallen how to kill and many grew twisted and evil. In the end, the Fallen lost the war, and were banished to the abyss of Hell as punishment for their transgressions. Lucifer was not among their ranks and wandered the Earth aimlessly after the war until finally setting down in modern-day Los Angeles.

This background provides a possible explanation for the conflicting origin stories of the other games in the Classic World of Darkness setting. Reality is presented during the Fall as being far less static and banal than it is in the modern game settings. The world went from being populated by two humans to having billions of humans with various civilizations and pasts existing at the same time (even when those pasts were contradictory to each other). One could deduce from this that the answer to which game provides the correct world origin story is: all of them were correct, all at the same time, and all at that one crucial point (the Fall).

== Setting ==
Due to the sixth maelstrom (caused by other supernaturals in the World of Darkness), the Gates of Hell that kept these demons from escaping their prison have begun to weaken, allowing the weakest of the Fallen to escape. However, to continue existing on Earth, a demon must find a suitable host for itself: bodies with weak souls, for example: comatose patients, severe drug addicts, the severely or clinically depressed, or suicidal people. The demon severs the weakened soul from the body and takes its place inside the host, merging with the host's memories and emotions, and continues existence on Earth to follow its own personal agenda while still balancing out the life of its vessel and the machinations of their demonic superiors to whom they are still bound.

While the mortal body provides the Fallen with a shield against the full memory of their torment in Hell, they are sometimes hindered by the memories and feelings the mortal soul left behind. The personal agendas of the demons vary from individual to individual; some demons wish to finish the war against Heaven, believing the disaster is still to be averted, some wish to take revenge upon humanity, believing humans are the primary cause for the war and the overall ruined state of the world, while other demons want to reconcile, repent for their sins and be able to return to God who, along with the remaining Elohim, has seemingly vanished from Creation for reasons unknown, leaving the unattended world to fall into chaos and despair.

== Characters ==
All characters must choose a "House" and a "faction". The seven Houses are similar to classes or character categories in other RPGs, to clans in Vampire: The Masquerade and similar groupings in other White Wolf games. The different factions are based on the demons' personal opinions and positions regarding the war, and have been formed before the War or after their escape.

All demons can use special magical powers called invocations, or Lores. All demons have access to two common Lores: Fundament, which allows them to suspend the laws of physics to perform superhuman feats, and Humanity, which allows them to commune with and manipulate mortals. Their other three Lores are determined by their House. All demons have an "apocalyptic form" or "visage"; this is an image or shadow of their true nature, their form before they were forced into mortal bodies. They can be demonic and horrible to behold, or angelic and beautiful, depending on the level of Torment a demon possesses in comparison to their Willpower.

== Antagonists ==
Upon their emergence, the Fallen quickly discovered that they were not the first to escape the Abyss. Hundreds of other demonic spirits were summoned back to Earth in the intervening centuries through the use of sorcery, and were then anchored to objects in place of the bodies possessed by the Fallen. This unnatural connection had left them hollow, tormented, and possessed of alien emotions and thought processes, as these artifacts do not provide the buffer against the memories of their suffering in the Abyss. The five Archdukes, lieutenants of Lucifer, were the first of the fallen angels to be summoned back to Earth. These included Asmodeus, Azrael, Dagon, Belial, and Abaddon, but were soon followed by hundreds of lesser-known demons. These "Earthbound" are immensely powerful, having had centuries to practice their abilities to perfection, as well as having been worshipped as gods by deranged cults for millennia. The rise of organized religion, as well as the Age of Enlightenment drove them into hibernation, but the return of the Fallen has led to the awakening of many of the Earthbound, who take steps to revive the cults which worship them, as well as enslave or destroy the Fallen. Every Earthbound possesses their own goals, but most involve the enslavement of humanity so that their potential can be harnessed to achieve the ends of that individual Earthbound.

There are also various human enemies that the Fallen may encounter: from those who mistake them for alien invaders to demonologists intent upon enslaving them to the Society of Leopold (the Modern Nights equivalent to the Inquisition) and others.

And then there are all the other supernatural creatures of the World of Darkness, who can become either an ally or enemy to the Fallen. This all depends upon the views of both the Fallen and the supernatural that the Fallen is interacting with (e.g. a Ravener is more likely to make friends with a Black Spiral Dancer than would be a Reconciler).

== Houses ==
The Fallen are divided into seven Houses. These are permanent aspects of the demon's design that the player must choose while creating their character. This determines what Lores the demon has access to and subsequently influences their apocalyptic form and basic predispositions.

=== Devil ===
Formally known as the Namaru, the Devils hail from the first host of angels who stood before God himself and were given authority over all other circles. Chief among them was Lucifer, the Morning Star and later the First of the Fallen, who bore the totality of the Creator's will. During the War of Wrath, their natural gifts of authority as well as their capacity to influence both human faith and flames made them ideal for leadership positions such as Legion commanders as well as making for fierce fell knights on the battlefield and protectors of humanity. Upon their reemergence into the modern world, Devils have become callous manipulators and charismatic demagogues - using their powers of persuasion and leadership to siphon off the arrogance and aspirations of humanity. Their proprietary Lores are Celestials, Flame, and Radiance.

=== Scourge ===
The Scourges, originally known as Asharu, were once guardian angels. They were the ones who guided the winds of creation, who granted the breath of life to all living things, and who defined the spiritual connections between living beings. They loved the humans, but their closeness to humanity drove them mad. When Lucifer started the rebellion they were the most followers in numbers, second only to his own house. Instead of being brave fighters, they made better spies. Now that they are free they find great respect, being able to heal with the right hand and harm with the left.

=== Malefactor ===
The Malefactors, known formally as Anunnaki, were angels of the forge, of tools, and of the earth, and were to guide humans in mastering these skills. But the humans were unable to follow the angels' instructions, and from this frustration they came to despise their mentors, much to the angels' confusion. When the War in Heaven broke out, they became rebels mainly because of their hatred for the humans they once loved: hatred against God for not allowing them to help the humans directly; and because they felt the others loved them. Once sentenced to Hell, they were without pure earth and fire and began to feel empty. Now free, they've found the humans have learned to use tools and manipulate the Earth, but have (as the Anunnaki see it) destroyed the planet in the process. These demons now see their goal as the destruction of the human race, so that the planet might be healed.

=== Fiend ===
The Fiends, known formally as Neberu, had the ability to sense the future. The Seer Ahrimal foresaw the War in Heaven, so many Fates turned from God's side to Lucifer's. Because of them, Lucifer and the rebels won many early battles, but their helpfulness decreased as the war went on. When God cast the rebels into Hell, the Neberu were put in their own special Perdition. When they emerged from Hell they had recovered a fraction of both their powers and their sanity. Their Lores give them dominion over time and light, and the ability to teleport through doorways.

=== Defiler ===
Formally known as the Lamassu, the Defilers hail from the host of angels who were given dominion over the seas and were meant to inspire humanity through desire and artistic expression. Because of their emotional nature, the Defilers were the first to succumb to Hell's isolation. Upon their emergence in the modern times, Defilers have become deviant seducers and dark muses - using their powers of inspiration and beauty to lead souls astray and siphon off both their genius and their decadence. Their proprietary Lores are Longing, Storms, and Transmutation.

=== Devourer ===
The Devourers, or Rabisu, were the Angels of the Wild, warriors without equal, the Sixth House. They are reckless, violent, and impulsive. Their lore allows them to command animals and plants alike, as well as shaping and reshaping the flesh of other beings as they desire to achieve such feats as increasing their strength, reflexes and senses, as well as taking the form of animals.

=== Slayer ===
The Slayers, originally known as the Reapers or the Halaku, were once angels of death. They were shunned by the other angels before the war. When Lucifer started his rebellion they joined him, as he promised them that they would be able to explain to humanity the reason that things they loved had to die. Their lore gives them the power to enter the Shadowlands, commune with and control ghosts, to sever the spirit from a body, and to create zombies. The Slayers usually join either the Ravener or Reconciler factions due to their affinity with death, their resentment of other Elohim, and their desire to return to Heaven.

== Factions ==
Factions are ideological groups of like-minded demons who share a similar outlook on humanity, God, and themselves. Unlike Houses, which are inherent, factions are open to any and all, although a demon's House can influence what faction they may gravitate towards.

=== Cryptics ===
The Cryptics have used their time in Hell to think. They feel that if God is omniscient, then his creations would be as perfect as reality would allow, and since Lucifer was God's highest angel, then his rebellion was a part of God's plan. The philosophers of the Fallen, the Cryptics gather knowledge to determine what is really going on and what they should do next. They dislike the Luciferans and the Faustians, approve of the Reconcilers asking questions, and dislike Raveners' destructive tendencies. They were initially to be called 'Inquisitors', but this was changed during production, although there are occasional references to them under this name in some books due to editing errors.

=== Faustians ===
The Faustians lust for revenge against God, whom they believe unjustly exiled them from Heaven. Even without the leadership of Lucifer, they still try to awaken the human race to its true potential, but only so humanity can be used as a potent weapon in yet another war against Heaven. The plots and intentions of a Faustian are often as subtle as they are dangerous. They have no patience for the Cryptics, their goals are directly opposite to those of the Raveners, Reconcilers can be friend or foe, and they can work with Luciferans.

=== Luciferans ===
The Luciferans still believe that Lucifer was right to rebel against God. Even though Lucifer cannot be found, they still follow what they feel to be his directives. Their leadership has divided them into three legions: the Legion of Majestic Liberation (who are searching for and attempting to free Lucifer), the Legion of Glorious Victory (who were organized to fight the Heavenly Host, but found no angels to oppose them), and the Legion of Stark Defiance (who secure supplies, resources, and safe havens for the rest of the faction). They dislike the Cryptics, can work with Faustians, consider the Reconcilers to be traitors, and consider Raveners to be enemies.

=== Raveners ===
The nihilistic Raveners look at the broken world and wasted potential of humanity and believe there's only one option left: destroy everything - first humanity, then themselves. Some see it as a way to finally lure out God and His angels, either to answer or to mercifully destroy them; others see it as an act of mercy to a near-dead and stagnant world; and many just don't care at all. They are enemies with all the other factions of demons, though they can tolerate the Cryptics as the Raveners assume they will eventually stop asking questions and start down destructive paths.

=== Reconcilers ===
The Reconcilers have used their time in Hell to reconsider their actions and the punishment that God meted out to them. Many have come to the conclusion that they were punished justly and that they must atone for their misdeeds; others simply feel that there is no point in continuing to fight a war they lost long ago against an omnipotent enemy. Now that they are free they wish to do some good, thinking that God might forgive them and allow them to return to Heaven. Even if he won't they might be able to help the humans, even fix things so the humans can have what they themselves can't. They are on good terms with the Cryptics and the Faustians, but are diametrically opposed to the goals of the Luciferans and the Raveners.

== Banishment and Death ==
When a demon's host is slain, the demon is not killed. The demon must merely find a new host or be pulled back into the Abyss. There are only two methods for slaying a demon written in the rulebooks. The first is if a demon's soul is devoured by another demon. The second is a ritual that can be performed by the members of the Inquisition which will "unmake" any high torment demon, but leaves low torment demons unaffected. There is no defense for demons against this, so the demons that know of it greatly fear Inquisitors.

== List of published Books ==
Taken from White Wolf's The Comprehensive World of Darkness Booklist. Since the production of the game line ended, no further books are to be expected.

Book name	White Wolf Product Number	Year	ISBN
Role Playing Source Books
Demon: The Fallen	WW8200	2001	ISBN 1-58846-750-3
Demon Storytellers Companion	WW8201	2002	ISBN 1-58846-751-1
Demon Players Guide	WW8202	2003	ISBN 1-58846-756-2
Houses of the Fallen	WW8203	2003	ISBN 1-58846-760-0
City of Angels	WW8211	2003	ISBN 1-58846-752-X
Saviors and Destroyers	WW8220	2003	ISBN 1-58846-754-6
Damned and Deceived	WW8221	2003	ISBN 1-58846-758-9
Fear to Tread	WW8270	2003	ISBN 1-58846-753-8
Earthbound	WW8280	2003	ISBN 1-58846-761-9
Days of Fire	WW8281	2003	ISBN 1-58846-762-7
Novels
Demon: Lucifer's Shadow	WW11904	2002	ISBN 1-58846-824-0
Trilogy of the Fallen, Book 1: Ashes and Angel Wings	WW10090	2003	ISBN 1-58846-805-4
Trilogy of the Fallen, Book 2: The Seven Deadlies	WW10091	2003	ISBN 1-58846-806-2
Trilogy of the Fallen, Book 3: The Wreckage of Paradis	WW10092	2003	ISBN 1-58846-807-0}

== Reviews ==
- Backstab #43

== See also ==
- Paradise Lost
