= Vampire: The Dark Ages =

1996 tabletop horror role-playing game

- First edition cover art
- Designers: Jennifer Hartshorn, Ethan Skemp, Mark Rein-Hagen, Kevin Hassall
- Publishers: White Wolf Publishing; Onyx Path Publishing
- Publication: March 1996 (first edition); 2002 (Dark Ages: Vampire); July 29, 2015 (V20 Dark Ages)
- Genres: Personal horror
- Systems: Storyteller System
- Series: World of Darkness

Vampire: The Dark Ages is a tabletop role-playing game published by White Wolf Publishing in March 1996. It is a spin-off from Vampire: The Masquerade, also published by White Wolf, which is set in modern times. It was released in a new edition in 2002 as Dark Ages: Vampire, and in 2015 as Vampire Twentieth Anniversary Edition: The Dark Ages. (Note: Abbreviated V20 Dark Ages)

== Setting ==
Vampire: The Dark Ages is set in medieval Europe in 1197, in the World of Darkness; the updated version Dark Ages: Vampire moves the timeline forward to 1230, and Vampire Twentieth Anniversary Edition: The Dark Ages further to 1242. Players take the roles of vampires, who believe themselves to have descended from the biblical Caine, the first murderer. Each vampire belongs to one of thirteen clans with different vampiric powers and weaknesses, and with different relationships with other clans. Vampires hold a lot of power, and humans know of their existence, unlike in the modern setting of Vampire: The Masquerade; because cities were smaller in the time of Vampire: The Dark Ages, however, it is more difficult for vampires to hide their activities, and they need to face enemies directly as they do not have access to modern technology. In addition to vampires, all other beings from the World of Darkness games appear in the Dark Ages setting, including werewolves, changelings, wraiths and mages.

== Gameplay ==
Vampire: The Dark Ages shares its basic Storyteller System gameplay system with the other World of Darkness games, and is compatible with Vampire: The Masquerade.

== History ==
Vampire: The Dark Ages was published by White Wolf Publishing in March 1996 as the first in a line of World of Darkness games with historical settings, each based on previous games in the series; the series also included 1997's Werewolf: The Wild West and 1998's Mage: The Sorcerer's Crusade. An updated version titled Dark Ages: Vampire was released in 2002, and received supplements based on other World of Darkness games, including Dark Ages: Mage and Dark Ages: Inquisitor in 2002; Dark Ages: Werewolf in 2003; and Dark Ages: Fae in 2004. A further update of the core game, Vampire Twentieth Anniversary Edition: The Dark Ages, was published by Onyx Path Publishing, and was funded through a Kickstarter campaign in 2014 and released on July 29, 2015.

The game was given a French translation and published in France by Hexagonal in November 1996; Twentieth Anniversary Edition also got French and Spanish releases by Arkhane Asylum Publishing and NoSoloRol in 2016 and 2017, respectively, both of which were financed through crowdfunding campaigns, and is planned to be released in Russian by Studio 101 in 2022.

== Reception ==
Reception
Review scores
| Source | Rating |
|---|---|
| Arcane | 8/10 |
| Backstab | 7/10 |
| SciFi-Universe | 70/100 |

Andy Butcher of Arcane called Vampire: The Dark Ages a great game with a lot of potential for many different kinds of scenarios. He called its "moody" atmosphere one of the biggest achievements of the game, which was helped by the artwork in the rule book, and enjoyed the interaction between the medieval setting and the vampires. He did however criticize how the game does not clearly define the nature of its version of vampires and only describes the setting broadly, making the game more difficult to play unless players have experience with Vampire: The Masquerade and some knowledge of 12th century history. He appreciated the single-roll, dice-based system for determining whether attempted tasks succeed, describing it as "simple and elegant" for allowing degrees of success or failure, but also criticized the gameplay for having unclear combat rules, something he described as a recurring problem in World of Darkness games.

Pyramid magazine reviewed Vampire: The Dark Ages and stated that "Vampire: The Dark Ages is White Wolf's newest and freshest release in its successful Vampire line of game products. Unlike the many supplements and source books which are so prevalent in roleplaying games today, Vampire: The Dark Ages is an entire game unto itself. Indeed, I had never even played a game of Vampire: The Masquerade before, but I was perfectly able (and more than eager) to play with just this one book."

By 1998 White Wolf was facing continued economic problems, and was hitting a crisis. Vampire: The Dark Ages was the only game from their remaining five World of Darkness games – the three historical games, and 1994's Wraith: The Oblivion and 1995's Changeling: The Dreaming – that sold well.

== Reviews ==
- Casus Belli #94
- Australian Realms #29

== Related media ==
In 1998, video game publisher Activision acquired the rights to develop video games based on Vampire: The Dark Ages, along with Vampire: The Masquerade and Kindred of the East.

The game was novelized as the thirteen-part Dark Ages Clan Novel series from 2002 to 2004.
