= White Wolf Publishing =

American roleplaying game and book publisher

White Wolf Entertainment AB
- Type: Subsidiary
- Industry: Role-playing games
- Founded: 1991 (White Wolf Corporation); 2016 (White Wolf Entertainment AB trademark filing date)
- Headquarters: Stockholm, Sweden
- Parent: Independent (1991–2006); CCP Games (2006–2015); Paradox Interactive (2015–present)
- Website: www.white-wolf.com

White Wolf Entertainment AB, formerly White Wolf Publishing, is an American roleplaying game and book publisher. The company was founded in 1991 as a merger between Lion Rampant and White Wolf Magazine (est. 1986 in Rocky Face, Georgia; it later became "White Wolf Inphobia"), and was initially led by Mark Rein-Hagen of the former and Steve Wieck and Stewart Wieck of the latter. White Wolf Publishing, Inc. merged with CCP Games in 2006. White Wolf Publishing operated as an imprint of CCP hf, but ceased in-house production of any material, instead licensing their properties to other publishers. It was announced in October 2015 that White Wolf had been acquired from CCP by Paradox Interactive. In November 2018, after most of its staff were dismissed for making controversial statements, it was announced that White Wolf would no longer function as an entity separate from Paradox Interactive. In May 2025, Jason Carl, Brand Marketing Manager at White Wolf, announced the company's return as the official licensing and publishing entity for all World of Darkness transmedia properties.

The name "White Wolf" originates from Michael Moorcock's works.

== Overview ==
White Wolf published a line of several different but overlapping games set in the "World of Darkness", a "modern gothic" world that, while seemingly similar to the real world, is home to supernatural terrors, ancient conspiracies, and several approaching apocalypses. The company also published the high fantasy Exalted RPG, the modern mythic Scion, and d20 system material under their Sword & Sorcery imprint, including such titles as the Dungeons & Dragons gothic horror campaign setting Ravenloft, and Monte Cook's Arcana Unearthed series. In order to complement the World of Darkness game line, a LARP system dubbed Mind's Eye Theatre has been published.

White Wolf also released several series of novels based on the Old World of Darkness, all of which are currently out of print (although many are coming back into availability via print-on-demand).

White Wolf also ventured in the collectible card game market with Arcadia, Rage, and Vampire: The Eternal Struggle (formerly Jyhad). V:TES, perhaps the most successful card game, was originally published by Wizards of the Coast in 1994, but was abandoned just two years later after a revamped base set, name change and three expansions were published. White Wolf acquired the rights to the game in 2000, even though no new material had been produced for the game in over four years. Since then, several V:TES expansions have been released, and the game was the only official source of material for the Old World of Darkness, until 2011 when the 20th Anniversary Edition of Vampire: The Masquerade was published and the Onyx Path was announced.

Video games such as Vampire: The Masquerade – Redemption and Vampire: The Masquerade – Bloodlines are based on White Wolf's role-playing game Vampire: The Masquerade. There are also several Hunter: The Reckoning video games.

== History ==
=== CCP merger and MMO development ===
On Saturday, 11 November 2006, White Wolf and CCP Games, the Icelandic MMO development company responsible for EVE Online, announced a merger between the two companies during the keynote address at the EVE Online Fanfest 2006. It was also revealed that a World of Darkness MMORPG was already in the planning stages. This game was cancelled in April 2014 after nine years of development.

=== Assets purchased by Onyx Path ===
At GenCon 2012 it was announced that CCP Games/White Wolf would not continue to produce table-top RPGs. Onyx Path Publishing, a new company by White Wolf Creative Director Richard Thomas, purchased the Trinity games and Scion from CCP and became licensee for the production of World of Darkness titles (classic and new), as well as Exalted. Onyx Path does not hold a license to the Mind's Eye Theatre titles.

=== Purchase by Paradox Interactive ===
On Thursday, 29 October 2015, Paradox Interactive and CCP announced that Paradox had purchased White Wolf and all of its intellectual properties. Tobias Sjögren would serve as the CEO of the revived company, which would remain a subsidiary of Paradox. Martin Ericsson, formerly a developer on the World of Darkness MMO, served in the "Lead Storyteller" role for the company.

In November 2018, as a result of backlash generated by material pertaining to the "murder of gay Chechens" published in a Vampire: The Masquerade Fifth Edition source book as well as the inclusion of optional neo-Nazi aesthetic in the Brujah vampire clan, it was announced that White Wolf would no longer function as an entity separate from its parent company, and would cease developing and publishing products internally. In May 2025, Paradox Interactive announced that it was rebranding its publisher World of Darkness, renaming it White Wolf. The new White Wolf would develop tabletop RPGs, as well as co-publish the video game Vampire: The Masquerade – Bloodlines 2 with Paradox Interactive.

== RPG products ==
=== The Old or Classic World of Darkness game lines ===
The games of this series use White Wolf's Storyteller System. Several games inspired spinoffs in the form of historical period settings such as the Dark Ages.

- Vampire: The Masquerade (including the spinoffs Vampire: The Dark Ages/Dark Ages: Vampire and Victorian Age: Vampire)
- Werewolf: The Apocalypse (including the spinoffs Werewolf: The Wild West and Werewolf: The Dark Ages/Dark Ages: Werewolf)
- Mage: The Ascension (including the spinoffs Mage: The Sorcerer's Crusade and Dark Ages: Mage)
- Wraith: The Oblivion (including the spinoff Wraith: The Great War)
- Changeling: The Dreaming (including the spinoff Dark Ages: Fae)
- Kindred of the East (including the spinoff Blood and Silk)
- Hunter: The Reckoning (including the semi-spinoff Dark Ages: Inquisitor)
- Mummy: The Resurrection
- Demon: The Fallen (including the spinoff Dark Ages: Devil's Due)
- Orpheus

In addition to those game lines a series of books was produced under the title World of Darkness. These provided stand-alone materials for multiple game lines with the focus on a specific region or theme, e.g. WoD: Blood-Dimmed Tides (about the oceans), WoD: Combat (an alternative 'crossover' combat system to resolve contradictory mechanics and add some sophistication), WoD: Tokyo, Hong Kong, Midnight Circus, and WoD: Mafia.

For the Third Edition of Ars Magica, White Wolf connected that game's pseudohistorical setting to the future World of Darkness setting. This was a simple adjustment (since the core premise of both settings is 'Earth as we know it' + 'supernatural fiction is reality') and particularly suited to the 'Tremere connection' between a clan of vampires from the original Vampire and a House of magi in the Order of Hermes (the central organization of Ars Magica as well as one of the 'Traditions' in M:TA).

=== The Chronicles of Darkness game lines ===
The games of this series use White Wolf's newer Storytelling System. Originally, they used a base generic rulebook, The World of Darkness: Storytelling System Rulebook, and was accompanied by supplements for its various game lines, each focusing on different supernatural beings. Later, each game line received its own standalone rulebook. Differently from the original World of Darkness line, its settings are less tightly defined and interconnected, allowing Storytellers greater freedom in developing their chronicles without being constrained by an extensive shared lore. Since the games also share the same basic rules, it allows characters from different game lines to coexist in crossover chronicles, with players taking on the roles of different supernatural beings.

For over a decade it was also known as "World of Darkness", causing it to be referred to as the "new World of Darkness" or nWoD to distinguish it from the prior line of games. In December 2015, it was renamed "Chronicles of Darkness" by its new publisher Onyx Path in order to more clearly distinguish the two given Paradox Entertainment's intention to reboot the original setting.

- Vampire: The Requiem
- Werewolf: The Forsaken
- Mage: The Awakening
- Promethean: The Created
- Changeling: The Lost
- Hunter: The Vigil
- Geist: The Sin-Eaters
- Mummy: The Curse
- Demon: The Descent
- Beast: The Primordial
- Deviant: The Renegades

=== Age of Sorrows ===
- Exalted

=== Trinity Universe ===
Trinity was originally named Æon, but a trademark issue with Viacom related to the MTV show Æon Flux resulted in a name change.

- Trinity (science fiction and psychics)
- Aberrant (near-future superheroes)
- Adventure! (1920s pulp heroes)

=== Other ===
- Pendragon
- Scion
- Street Fighter: The Storytelling Game
- Engel

== Mind's Eye Theatre (LARP) ==
The majority of the Old World of Darkness games were adapted into the original Mind's Eye Theatre format for live-action roleplaying. Product lines in this era include:

- Laws of the Night (formerly Masquerade; based on Vampire: The Masquerade)
- Laws of the Wild (formerly Apocalypse; based on Werewolf: The Apocalypse)
- Oblivion (based on Wraith: The Oblivion)
- Laws of the Hunt (focusing on mortals as characters)
- The Long Night (based on Vampire: The Dark Ages)
- The Shining Host (based on Changeling: The Dreaming)
- Laws of the Wyld West (based on Werewolf: The Wild West)
- Laws of Ascension (based on Mage: The Ascension)
- Laws of the Reckoning (based on Hunter: The Reckoning)
- Laws of Resurrection (based on Mummy: The Resurrection)
- Laws of the East (based on Kindred of the East)
- Faith and Fire (based on Dark Ages: Vampire)
- Vampire by Gaslight (based on Victorian Age: Vampire)

Subsequently, the Mind's Eye Theatre was revamped for the New World of Darkness. A core Mind's Eye Theatre rulebook was published as the LARP analogue to the World of Darkness core rulebook, with several Mind's Eye Theatre adaptations following in suit: The Requiem, The Forsaken, and The Awakening each adapted their respective namesakes to the new system of MET rules. The license to produce Mind's Eye Theatre content was acquired by By Night Studios in 2013.

=== By Night Studios ===
At Midwinter Gaming Convention in 2013 it was announced that as a result of CCP Games' discontinuation of publishing, By Night Studios had acquired the license to all Mind's Eye Theatre titles. In May 2013, By Night Studios launched a successful Kickstarter campaign to rebuild the Mind's Eye Theatre: Vampire The Masquerade product specifically for the Live-Action Role Play audience. The book was published in December 2013. This was followed by Mind's Eye Theatre: Werewolf the Apocalypse in October 2016 and Mind's Eye Theatre: Changeling the Dreaming in 2020.

In 2019, By Night Studios released Mind's Eye Theatre: Vampire the Masquerade, Volume II: Issue 1, intended to be the first in a series of releases featuring new character options. Eventually each of these releases would be collected within a full edition of Volume II. This plan was eventually scrapped in favor of releasing the full version of Mind's Eye Theatre: Vampire the Masquerade, Volume 2 in October 2021, featuring the additional new rules that were slated to appear in Issues 2 and 3.

After publication of Vampire the Masquerade, Volume 2, work began Mind's Eye Theatre: Werewolf the Apocalypse, Volume 2, which was written but never scheduled for formal release. In February 2023, the manuscript was released on the By Night Studios website for free.

In May 2023, By Night Studios announced a new Laws of the Night, featuring new live action rules based on Vampire: The Masquerade, Fifth Edition. A crowdfunding campaign was launched and successfully raised $111,165 with a target goal of $25,000. The PDF version of the book was released online in September 2023, with physical copies scheduled to ship in 2024.

By Night Studios also published Mind's Eye Theatre: Vampire the Masquerade: War of Ages in 2023, which took the setting for Vampire the Masquerade, Fifth Edition and re-imagined the game in the style of Nordic live action role-playing games, focusing less on game mechanics in favor of a deeper focus on immersive role-playing.

== Fiction ==
Starting in 1986, White Wolf published fiction in various formats, beginning with its eponymous magazine title (which ran 57 issues), then three comic book titles in 1987, and on to graphic novels, paperbacks and hardcover books. Works included novels and anthologies based on White Wolf's games, as well as general fantasy and horror fiction. White Wolf printed several Elric of Melniboné collections by Michael Moorcock. The company also put out general fiction collections by Harlan Ellison, as well as several paperback editions of the "Borderlands" anthologies edited by Thomas F. Monteleone.

=== Imprints and labels ===
White Wolf had different imprints under which various books are published, most notably:

- Arthaus – products for which White Wolf serves as publisher, not developer
- Black Dog Game Factory – adult themed products (defunct)
- Sword and Sorcery Studios – products compatible with the d20 system by Wizards of the Coast

Black Dog Game Factory was also a fictional company in the World of Darkness, as detailed in the Subsidiaries: A Guide to Pentex game supplement.

== Reception ==
White Wolf won the 2004 Silver Ennie Award for "Best Publisher".

== See also ==
- Sword and Sorcery Studios
