= List of Exalted publications =

Below is a listing of all of the sourcebooks for the role-playing game Exalted (first, second, and third editions) by White Wolf Publishing. For a list of the Exalted comics by UDON, see Exalted (comics).

== 1st Edition (2001-2005) ==
1. Exalted Limited Edition: The core rulebook, a making of booklet and a CD containing a very limited character generator. (WW8800, July 2001, ISBN 1-58846-654-X
2. Exalted (by White Wolf Publishing): The core rulebook, detailing the setting and history of the world, and presenting rules for playing Solar Exalted. (WW8800, August 2001, ISBN 1-56504-623-4)
3. Exalted Storyteller's Companion (by Heather Grove, Dean Shomshak, and Adam Tinworth): One of the early supplements detailing the Scarlet Empire, (early versions of) Celestial Exalted, Spirits and Spirit Courts, and other wonders. (WW8801, August 2001, ISBN 1-58846-650-7)
4. Scavenger Sons (by Justin Achilli, John Snead, and Scott Taylor): This supplement gives a general description of the different areas of the Threshold, specifically the North, the East, the South, the West, the Scavenger Lands, Nexus and has appendixes on groups and organizations in the Threshold, and the Fair Folk. (WW8820, August 2001, ISBN 1-58846-652-3)
5. The Book of Three Circles (by White Wolf Publishing): The first version of a book detailing sorcery in the world of Exalted. The book contains sorcerous spells for Terrestrial, Celestial and Solar Circle spells, as well as other works of wonder, details on demesnes, manses and hearthstones, and an appendix on War Striders. (WW8802, September 2001, ISBN 1-58846-651-5)
6. Caste Book: Dawn (by John Snead and Dawn Elliott): A book outlining the Dawn Caste for Solar Exalted. It contains the personal stories of five Dawn Caste Solars, plus new charms, artifacts and signature characters. It also includes information on the Exalted signature character, Dace. (WW8830, November 2001, ISBN 1-58846-653-1)
7. Time of Tumult (by White Wolf Publishing): This supplement contains four adventures for the world of Exalted, as well as further artifacts, charms and initial details on the Alchemical Exalted. (WW8821, January 2002, ISBN 1-58846-655-8)
8. Caste Book: Zenith (by Steve Kenson and David Wendt): A book outlining the Zenith Caste for Solar Exalted. It contains the personal stories of five Zenith Caste Solars, plus new charms, artifacts and signature characters. It also includes information on the Exalted signature character, Panther. (WW8831, February 2002, ISBN 1-58846-660-4)
9. Exalted: The Dragon-Blooded (by White Wolf Staff, Brian Armor, Hal Mangold, and James Maliszewski): The first hardcover sourcebook (or "fatsplat"), detailing the Terrestrial Exalted (or Dragon-Blooded), the weakest of the Exalted, and the Realm they govern. (WW8811, April, 2002, ISBN 1-58846-656-6)
10. Savage Seas (by Robert J. Defendi, Dan Quackenbush, and Scott Taylor): This book details seafaring in the world of Exalted, outlining the day-to-day on the tides, sailing technology and maritime trades, plus creatures, gods, charms and artifacts all related to seafaring. (WW8822, June 2002, ISBN 1-58846-658-2)
11. Caste Book: Twilight (by Genevieve Cogman and Dawn Elliott): A book outlining the Twilight Caste for Solar Exalted. It contains the personal stories of five Twilight Caste Solars, plus new charms, artifacts and signature characters. It also includes information on the Exalted signature character, Arianna. (WW8832, July 2002, ISBN 1-58846-661-2)
12. Games of Divinity (by Michael Kessler, John Snead, and R. Sean Borgstrom): An important sourcebook for material on gods, elementals, demons and spirit charms. (WW8823, August 2002, ISBN 1-58846-659-0)
13. Caste Book: Night (by Brian Schoner and John Snead): A book outlining the Night Caste for Solar Exalted. It contains the personal stories of five Night Caste Solars, plus new charms, artifacts and signature characters. It also includes information on the Exalted signature character, Harmonious Jade. (WW8833, October 2002, ISBN 1-58846-662-0)
14. Exalted: The Lunars (by Bryan Armor, Chris Hartford, James Kiley, and Malcolm Sheppard): A sourcebook detailing the culture and game mechanics of the bestial and savage Lunar characters and the barbarian tribes they associate with, as well as information on the Wyld, a zone of chaos that rings the world. (WW8812, November 2002, ISBN 1-58846-657-4)
15. Creatures of the Wyld (by White Wolf Publishing): A bestiary for Exalted, covering a number of creatures from each of the elemental directions (North, East, South and West) and the Scavenger Lands. (WW8803, January 2003, ISBN 1-58846-663-9)
16. Caste Book: Eclipse (by White Wolf Publishing): A book outlining the Eclipse Caste for Solar Exalted. It contains the personal stories of five Eclipse Caste Solars, plus new charms, artifacts and signature characters. It also includes information on the Exalted signature character, Swan. (WW8834, February 2003, ISBN 1-58846-664-7)
17. Exalted: The Abyssals (by Richard Dansky, Dawn Elliot, Michael Kessler, and Michael Goodwin): A sourcebook for Abyssal Exalted, ghost characters, the Underworld and a brief history of the Deathlords. (WW8813, April 2003, ISBN 1-58846-665-5)
18. Ruins of Rathess (by James Maliszewski and John Snead): A sourcebook for the city of Rathess, once the pinnacle of the Dragon Kings' civilization. This book outlines the history of the Dragon Kings, the city of Rathess and its vicinity, stalkers, gods and other foes, and rewards to be found in Rathess. (WW8824, May 2003, ISBN 1-58846-666-3)
19. Manacle and Coin (by John Snead, Geoff Grabowski, Malcolm Sheppard, and Ian Eller): This book on the economy of the world of Exalted gives specific information on The Guild, its history and structure, drugs - the soft trade, slaves - the hard trade, plus money and finance in Creation. (WW8825, July 2003, ISBN 1-58846-667-1)
20. Aspect Book: Air (by B. D. Flory and W. Van Meter): A book outlining the Air Aspected Terrestrial Exalted. It contains the personal stories of five Air Aspected Dragon-Bloods, plus new charms, artifacts and signature characters. It also includes information on the Exalted signature character, Tepet Arada. (WW8840, August 2003, ISBN 1-58846-668-X)
21. Exalted: The Sidereals (by Bryan Armor, Rebecca Borgstrom, Geoff Grabowski, Steve Kenson, and John Snead): A sourcebook for Sidereal Exalted characters, including details on the Heavenly city of Yu-Shan. (WW8814, October 2003, ISBN 1-58846-669-8)
22. Kingdom of Halta (by Matthew McFarland and John Snead): This book details the Kingdom of Halta, magical beings of Halta, plus beasts, manses and sundry wonders. (WW8826, December 2003, ISBN 1-58846-670-1)
23. Exalted: The Outcaste (by White Wolf and White Wolf Publishing Inc): This book contains valuable information on those Dragon-Blooded who are not born to the scions of the Realm, but serve other powers or none at all. This book outlines Lookshy and the Seventh Legion, Eos and Ossia, the Forest Witches and Lost Eggs. (WW8850, January 2004, ISBN 1-58846-671-X)
24. Blood and Salt (by Geoff Grabowski, Genevieve Cogman, Ian Eller, and Michael Kessler): Blood & Salt fills in the gaps that Savage Seas did not cover, mainly An-Teng, the Lintha Family and more gods and monsters. (WW8827, March 2004, ISBN 1-58846-672-8)
25. Exalted Player's Guide (by White Wolf and White Wolf Publishing Inc): Primarily a sourcebook for creatures of lesser power than the Exalted and another supplement that fleshes out the world of Exalted, this book covers merits and flaws, the God-Blooded, Half Castes, mortal thaumaturgy, the Dragon Kings, Exalted power combat and details a writing system in the Age of Sorrows. (WW8804, April 2004, ISBN 1-58846-673-6)
26. Aspect Book: Earth (by Eric Brennan, Michael Goodwin, Mur Lafferty, and Peter Schaefer): A book outlining the Earth Aspected Terrestrial Exalted. It contains the personal stories of five Earth Aspected Dragon-Bloods, plus new charms, artifacts and signature characters. It also includes information on the Exalted signature character, Mnemon, one of the daughters of the Scarlet Empress. (WW8841, June 2004, ISBN 1-58846-674-4)
27. Savant and Sorcerer (by R. Sean Borgstrom, Adam Tinworth, and Scott Taylor): The latest version of material covering sorcery in the world of Exalted. This book explains magical theory, artifice and enchantment, puts further detail into demesnes and manses, outlines practical summonings and expands upon and revises spells, in addition to having an appendix covering War Striders in greater detail. (WW8805, July 2004, ISBN 1-58846-675-2)
28. Aspect Book: Fire (by Kraig Blackwelder and Genevieve Cogman): A book outlining the Fire Aspected Terrestrial Exalted. It contains the personal stories of five Fire Aspected Dragon-Bloods, plus new charms, artifacts and signature characters. It also includes information on the Exalted signature characters, Cynis Denovah Avaku and Sesus Rafara. (WW8842, September 2004, ISBN 1-58846-676-0)
29. Houses of the Bull God (by Michael Kessler, Geoffrey Skellams, Andrew Watt, and Voronica Whitney-Robinson): This supplement fleshes out the land of Harborhead, the Imperial Garrison in Harborhead, gods, monsters and manses in the area, and contains an appendix on the Court of the Orderly Flame. (WW8828, October 2004, ISBN 1-58846-677-9)
30. Exalted: The Fair Folk (by Rebecca Borgstrom, Eric Brennan, Genevieve Cogman, Michael Goodwin, and John Snead): A sourcebook for the Raksha, also called the Fair Folk, beings born of passion and myth amidst the Wyld. (WW8815, November 2004, ISBN 1-58846-678-7)
31. The Book of Bone and Ebony (by Kraig Blackwelder, Genevieve Cogman, and Daniel Dover): This is a compendium of knowledge for those skilled in the art of Necromancy. This supplement contains information on the capital of the Underworld - the City of Stygia, arts of the dead, wonders of the dead, creations of bone, the three Circles of Necromancy (Shadowlands, Labyrinth and Void), and creatures of the Underworld. (WW8806, March 2005, ISBN 1-58846-680-9)
32. Aspect Book: Water (by Ian Eller and John Snead): A book outlining the Water Aspected Terrestrial Exalted. It contains the personal stories of five Water Aspected Dragon-Bloods, plus new charms, artifacts and signature characters. It also includes information on the Exalted signature character, Peleps Deled. (WW8843, April 2005, ISBN 1-58846-679-5)
33. Cult of the Illuminated (by Daniel Dover, Mur Lafferty, and Patrick O'Duffy): This book details the workings of the Gold Faction Sidereal organization known as the Cult of the Illuminated, explaining the workings of the outer circle, the inner circle, the training camps and giving more details on the Wyld Hunt. (WW8829, May 2005, ISBN 1-58846-682-5)
34. Exalted: The Autochthonians (by Kraig Blackwelder, Michael Goodwin, John Snead, and Michael Kessler): A sourcebook detailing the parallel world of Autochthonia, and its artificially created champions, the Alchemical Exalted. (WW8816, May 2005, ISBN 1-58846-681-7)
35. Aspect Book: Wood (by George Holochwost, Ellen P. Kiley, and Exalted): A book outlining the Wood Aspected Terrestrial Exalted. It contains the personal stories of five Wood Aspected Dragon-Bloods, plus new charms, artifacts and signature characters. It also includes information on the Exalted signature characters Sesus Nagezzer and Tepet Ejava "The Roseblack". (WW8844, August 2005, ISBN 1-58846-683-3)
36. Bastions of the North (by Kraig Blackwelder, Genevieve Cogman, Geoff Grabowski, and Andrew Watt): This supplement details the cities of Whitewall and Gethamane, as well as detailing the Haslanti League and contains an appendix on Swar - an unshaped Raksha who has taken the form of a fake First Age ruin. (WW8807, November 2005, ISBN 1-58846-686-8)

== Official fiction ==
1. A Day Dark as Night (10065) ISBN 1-58846-859-3
2. Relic of the Dawn (10066) ISBN 1-58846-860-7
3. In Northern Twilight (10067) ISBN 1-58846-861-5
4. Pillar of the Sun (10068) ISBN 1-58846-868-2
5. A Shadow Over Heavens Eye (10069) ISBN 1-58846-871-2
6. The Carnelian Flame (10070) ISBN 1-58846-882-8
7. Trilogy of the Second Age:Chosen of the Sun (10080) ISBN 1-58846-800-3
8. Trilogy of the Second Age: Beloved of the Dead (10081) ISBN 1-58846-801-1
9. Trilogy of the Second Age: Children of the Dragon (10082) ISBN 1-58846-802-X

== 2nd Edition (2006-2012) ==
=== Print publications ===
1. Exalted: Second Edition (by Alan Alexander, Rebecca Borgstrom, Carl Bowen, Michael Goodwin, John Snead and Andrew Watt): The core rulebook, detailing the setting and history of the world, and presenting rules for playing Solar Exalted. (WW80000, March 2006, ISBN 1-58846-684-1)
2. Exalted: Second Edition Storyteller's Companion (by Alan Alexander, Zach Bush, Joseph Carriker, and Peter Schaefer): Details information about the various types of Exalted. Contains information about the military might of the major groups in creation. (WW80001, March 2006, ISBN 1-58846-685-X)
3. The Books of Sorcery, Vol. I: Wonders of the Lost Age (by Alan Alexander, Kraig Blackwelder, Michael Goodwin, and John Snead): Presents Artifacts of the First Age and includes detailed rules for the use of War Striders. (WW80300, April 2006, ISBN 1-58846-691-4)
4. The Compass of Terrestrial Directions, Vol. I: The Scavenger Lands (by Kraig Blackwelder, Genevieve Cogman, Daniel Dover, and Michael Kessler): Background information relating to Lookshy, Thorns, Nexus, Great Fork, and Greyfalls, as well as the abandoned manufacturing city of Denandsor. (WW80200, June 2006, ISBN 1-58846-687-6)
5. The Manual of Exalted Power: The Dragon-Blooded (by "Exalted"): A book detailing the Terrestrial Exalted. (WW80100, July 2006, ISBN 1-58846-688-4)
6. The Compass of Celestial Directions, Vol. I: The Blessed Isle (by Carl Bowden, Joseph Carriker, Jess Hartley, and John Snead): Details information on the most important island in all Creation, including prefectures and the entities who live there. (WW80215, October 2006, 1-58846-690-6)
7. The Scroll of the Monk (by Carl Bowen, Lydia Laurenson, Peter Schaefer, and Dustin Shampel): Details a series of martial arts styles and the feuds and rivalries of those who use them. Additional material was released in a PDF format only. (WW80310, November 2006, ISBN 1-58846-689-2)
8. The Books of Sorcery, Vol. II: White and Black Treatises (by Joseph Carriker, Lydia Laurenson, Peter Schaefer, and Dustin Shampel): A tome of spells for sorcery and necromancy. Includes spells updated from 1st edition Exalted and some spells new to the game. (WW80301, January 2007, 978-1-58846-692-1)
9. The Compass of Celestial Directions, Vol. II: The Wyld (by Genevieve Cogman, Peter Schaefer, and John Snead): Details the Wyld, the kingdoms of the Fair Folk, and the rest of the chaos that exists outside of creation. (WW80216, March 2007, ISBN 978-1-58846-693-8)
10. The Manual of Exalted Power: The Lunars (by Alan Alexander): A book detailing the Lunar Exalted, which, by comparison with the 1st ed Lunar book, expands their role in the Age of Sorrows. Explains the Lunar Thousand Streams River experiment. (WW80101, April 2007, ISBN 978-1-58846-694-5)
11. The Books of Sorcery, Vol. III: Oadenol's Codex (by Conrad Hubbard, Lydia Laurenson, Peter Schaefer, Dustin Shampel, and John Snead): Contains expanded information on creating new Artifacts and Manses, as well as thaumaturgy rules. (WW80302, May 2007, ISBN 978-1-58846-695-2)
12. The Compass of Terrestrial Directions, Vol. II: The West (by Alan Alexander, Eric Brennan, Genevieve Cogman, and Conrad Hubbard): Information on seafaring nations of Wavecrest, The Neck, Coral, and Skullstone; lost cities; and the three cultural groups of the Lintha family, the Tya, and the Delkzani. (WW80201, July 2007, ISBN 978-1-58846-696-9)
13. The Manual of Exalted Power: The Sidereals (by Alan Alexander, Carl Bowen, Joseph Carriker, Conrad Hubbard, Peter Schaefer, Stephen Lea Sheppard and Dean Shomshak): A book detailing the Sidereal Exalted and the workings of the Bureau of Destiny. Includes expanded information on how Sidereal conventions affect the Bureau's politics. (WW80102, September 2007, ISBN 978-1-58846-697-6)
14. The Books of Sorcery, Vol. IV: The Roll of Glorious Divinity I: Gods & Elementals (by Eric Brennan, Deirdre Brooks, Conrad Hubbard, Lydia Laurenson, Dustin Shampel and Stephen Lea Sheppard). Focuses mainly on Terrestrial gods; Celestial gods are more comprehensively listed in Yu Shan.(WW80303, October 2007, ISBN 978-1-58846-698-3)
15. The Compass of Celestial Directions, Vol. III: Yu-Shan (by Alan Alexander, Eric Brennan, Genevieve Cogman and Stephen Lea Sheppard): A book detailing the heavenly realm of Yu-Shan and the Archipelago of Exiles in the West. Includes sections on the bureaucracy and geography of Exalted's heaven as well as prominent Celestial gods. Terrestrial Gods are covered in The Roll of Glorious Divinity I. (WW80217, April 2008, ISBN 978-1-58846-610-5)
16. Scroll of Kings (by Michael Goodwin, Dean Shomshak and Scott Taylor): A book entirely about mortal wars. Includes expanded mass combat rules, rules for using firedust weapons, and naval combat rules. (WW80207, April 2008)
17. The Manual of Exalted Power: The Abyssals (by Alan Alexander, Carl Bowen, Daniel Dover, Michael Goodwin and Dustin Shampel): A book detailing the Abyssal Exalted. Includes information on the Deathlords and Necrotech.(WW80002, April 2008, ISBN 978-1-58846-612-9)
18. Dreams of the First Age (by Alan Alexander, John Chambers, Dawn Elliot, Michael Goodwin, Lydia Laurenson, Peter Shaefer, Dustin Shampel, Stephen Lea Sheppard, John Snead and Andrew Watt): Exalted box set, containing information on the setting during the First Age. Includes a briefing pamphlet to give to new players entitled A Guide to Meru, a setting book entitled Lands of Creation, a mechanics and NPC book entitled Lords of Creation, a combat wheel for counting ticks in battle, and a cloth map which shows Creation as it was during the First Age. The First Age incarnations of important signature characters and favorite cities are revealed, character creation rules are offered for four different game power levels, and the social order of the Dragon-Blooded is drastically changed. (WW80602, May 2008, ISBN 978-1-58846-620-4)
19. The Compass of Celestial Directions, Vol. IV: the Underworld (by Alan Alexander, Daniel Dover, Dawn Elliot and Dean Shomshak): Details the largest gathering of the dead, Stygia, and other necropoli like Chiaroscuro, Dari, and Sijan, as well as First and Forsaken Lion's fortress of Merciless, major shadowlands like Marama's Fell, and the living lost city on the continent of Saigoth. (WW80218, June 2008, ISBN 978-1-58846-613-6)
20. The Books of Sorcery, Vol. V: The Roll of Glorious Divinity II: Ghosts & Demons (by Alan Alexander, Carl Bowen, Joseph Carriker, John Chambers, Conrad Hubbard, Lydia Laurenson, and Stephen Lea Sheppard): Contains information on how to run summoned demons, major demons/souls of the Yozis, and character creation rules and Arcanoi for ghost PCs. (WW80304, July 2008, ISBN 978-1-58846-447-7)
21. The Compass of Terrestrial Directions, Vol. III: The East (by Alan Alexander, Genevieve Cogman, Daniel Dover, Dawn Elliot, Michael Kessler, Dustin Shampel, John Snead and Andrew Watt): This has information on the warring nations of Halta and the Linowan, the funeral city of Sijan, Mount Metagalapa and its Hawkriders, the Republic of Chaya, the Horde, the conflict between the Ten Tribes and the logging outpost of Farhold, Raksi's territory of Mahalanka, and the abandoned city of Rathess. (WW80202, January 2009, ISBN 978-1-58846-617-4)
22. Scroll of Fallen Races (by Michael Kessler, Dustin Shampel, John Snead, Christina Stiles, Scott Taylor and Andrew Watt): Details the Mountain Folk and the Dragon Kings. (WW80208, January 2009, ISBN 978-1-58846-615-0)
23. Graceful Wicked Masques: The Fair Folk (by Alan Alexander, Carl Bowen and Stephen Lea Sheppard): Replaces 1st ed's Exalted: The Fair Folk. (WW80003, February 2009, ISBN 978-1-58846-618-1)
24. The Compass of Terrestrial Directions, Vol. IV: The South (by Michael Kessler, Jack Norris, Dean Shomshak, John Snead and Christina Stile): Information on Southern cities of Gem, Paragon, Chiarascuro, and The Lap, and the states of Varangia, Harbourhead, and An Teng. (WW80203, February 2009, ISBN 978-1-58846-363-0)
25. Manual of Exalted Power - The Infernals (by Alan Alexander, Carl Bowen, Michael Goodwin, Eric Minton and Neall Raemonn Price): Covers both Akuma and Green Sun Princes. (WW80105, April 2009, ISBN 978-1-58846-366-1)
26. The Art of Exalted: A compendium of previously published and new artwork. (WW80315, March 2009, ISBN 978-1-58846-359-3)
27. The Compass of Celestial Directions, Vol. V: Malfeas (by Eric Minton, Jack Norris and Dean Shomshak): Contains information on the Yozi demon-prison realm. (WW80106, May 2009, ISBN 978-1-58846-372-2)
28. Scroll of Heroes (by Alan Alexander, Genevieve Cogman, Jack Norris, Neall Raemonn Price and Andrew Watt): Contains information on mortals, including God-Blooded and Half-Castes, construct races and a merits & flaws system. (WW80209, August 2009, ISBN 978-1-58846-376-0)
29. The Compass of Terrestrial Directions, Vol. V: The North (by Michael Kessler, Priscilla Kim, Eric Minton, Dean Shomshak and John Snead): Contains information on Northern states and cities. (WW80204, November 2009, ISBN 978-1-58846-379-1)
30. Scroll of Exalts (by Alan Alexander, Carl Bowen, John Chambers, Michael A. Goodwin, Holden Shearer and Dean Shomshak): Covers major NPCs, including all of the signature characters. (WW80210, January 2010, ISBN 978-1-58846-387-6)
31. Manual of Exalted Power - The Alchemicals (by Alan Alexander, Michael A. Goodwin, Neall Raemonn Price, Holden Shearer and Peter K. Ullmann): Covers the Alchemical Exalted. (WW80107, February 2010, ISBN 978-1-58846-384-5)
32. Under the Rose (by Michael Goodwin): An adventure module involving the rescue of the Roseblack, an influential Dragon-Blooded general, from the Imperial Manse, which takes place in the same setting as Return of the Scarlet Empress. Released for Free RPG Day 2010. (June 2010, WW80908)
33. Return of the Scarlet Empress (by Carl Bowen, Michael A. Goodwin, Holden Shearer, Dean Shomshak and John Snead): A scenario book covering the invasion of Creation by the Scarlet Empress, the Ebon Dragon and their forces. (August 2010, WW80108, ISBN 978-1-58846-391-3)

=== Digital publications ===
1. Daughter of Nexus (by Adam Eichelberger): An adventure module written in White Wolf's Storytelling System (SAS) format. (June 2008, WW80909)
2. Disease of an Evil Conscience (by David Nurenberg): An adventure module written in White Wolf's Storytelling Adventure System (SAS) format. (March 2009, WW80907)
3. ExXxalted: Scroll of Swallowed Darkness (by Conrad Hubbard, Jess Hartley and Priscilla Kim): Released as an April Fools' Day joke, this book is presented as a preview containing excerpts from the fictitious, supposedly forthcoming full version of the Scroll of Swallowed Darkness. (April 2009, WWXXXXX)
4. Glories of the Most High: The Unconquered Sun (by Michael Goodwin, John Mørke and Holden Shearer): Covers the Unconquered Sun, the Celestial Incarna patron of the Solar Exalted. (November 2009, WW80004-1)
5. Glories of the Most High: Luna (by Michael Goodwin, John Mørke and Holden Shearer): Covers Luna, the Celestine Incarna patron of the Lunar Exalted. (November 2009, WW80004-2)
6. Glories of the Most High: The Maidens of Destiny (by Michael Goodwin, John Mørke and Holden Shearer): Coverns the five Maidens of Destiny, the Celestial Incarna patrons of the Sidereal Exalted. (November 2009, WW80004-2)
7. Splinters of the Wyld (by Genevieve Cogman, Peter Schaefer, John Snead and Alan Alexander): A compilation of cut material originally written for The Compass of Celestial Directions, Vol. II: The Wyld. (January 2010, WW80005)
8. The Thousand Correct Actions of the Upright Soldier (by Carl Bowen and Michael Goodwin): Contains updated versions of the Dragon-Blooded charms from Manual of Exalted Power: The Dragon-Blooded, new Dragon-Blooded charms and the text of the titular in-universe military manual. (February 2010, WW80007)
9. Debris from the Fallen Races (by Holden Shearer and Scott Taylor): A compilation of cut material originally written for Scroll of the Fallen Races. (February 2010, WW80010)
10. Contagion of Law (by Shane Cherry) An SAS adventure module. (June 2010, WW80006)
11. Scroll of Errata (John Chambers, Michael A. Goodwin, John Mørke, Holden Lee Shearer, Charles H. Spaulding, Robert Vance) A compilation of errata and rules and setting updates. (October 2010)
12. The Broken-Winged Crane (by Michael A. Goodwin, Eric Minton, John Mørke, Neall Raemonn Price and Holden Shearer): A supplement focused on the Infernal Exalted, including both new material and cut material originally written for Manual of Exalted Power: The Infernals. (November 2010, WW80911)
13. Ink Monkeys blog (Michael A. Goodwin, Eric Minton, John Mørke, Holden Lee Shearer, Dean Shomshak, Robert Vance): A series of 48 Exalted-related articles, including both cut material and wholly new content (February 16, 2010 to December 26, 2010).
14. Compass of Celestial Directions Vol. VI: Autochthonia (Michael Goodwin, Eric Minton, John Mørke, Neall Raemonn Price, Holden Shearer and Robert Vance): A supplement in the Compass of Celestial Directions series covering Autochthonia, the mechanical world-body of the Primordial Autochthon. To be released in 4 parts. (May 2011, June 2011, July 2011 and August 2011 for parts 1..4, September 2011 for the compiled version)
15. In Hunting A Monster (Adam Eichelberger): An SAS adventure module. (June 2011, WW80912)
16. Masters of Jade (Michael Goodwin, Eric Minton, John Mørke, Neall Raemonn Price, Holden Shearer, Dean Shomshak, Charles H. Spaulding, and Robert Vance): A supplement covering the Guild, and detailing the new Creation-Ruling Mandate system for organizations and bureaucracies. (February 2012)
17. Shards of the Exalted Dream (Eric Brennan, Elizabeth Grushcow, Eric Minton, John Mørke, Holden Shearer, Charles H. Spaulding and Robert Vance): A supplement detailing four alternate settings for Exalted: Gunstar Autochthonia (a space opera setting named after Battlestar Galactica, although with only slight similarities), Heaven's Reach (a far future soft SF space opera setting which reimagines many of the setting's supernatural elements, such as Exaltations, Charms, Primordials and the Celestial Bureaucracy as advanced technology), Burn Legend (a wuxia setting which reimagines the Exalted as martial artists with supernatural powers) and Exalted: the Modern Age (which reimagines Creation as an urban fantasy setting). Contains additional rules to account for the presence of vehicles and firearms and alternate forms of existing rules, while Burn Legend possesses its own rules and martial arts-driven combat system separate from the default. (July 2012, WW8035)

== 3rd edition (2016-present) ==
=== Currently available ===
1. Exalted 3rd Edition (Eric Brennan, Manda Collis, Meghan Fitzgerald, Geoff Grabowski, Susann Hessen, Liz Grushcow, Eric Minton, Jenna Moran, John Mørke, Holden Shearer, Stephen Lea Sheppard, John Snead, Robert Vance, Rachel Witter): The core rulebook, containing setting and system information, plus full rules for playing mortals and Solar Exalted. 687 pages. (April 2016)
2. Miracles of the Solar Exalted (John Morke): Additional Solar Exalted Charms based on Kickstarter backer proposals and general expansion. 39 pages. (July 2016)
3. Tomb of Dreams (Stephen Lea Sheppard): A jumpstart adventure for Exalted 3rd Edition. Includes a scenario for up to five players, a set of pre-created Solar Exalted characters, and a rules summary to introduce new players to the main systems of Exalted 3rd Edition. 58 pages. (May 2017)
4. Arms of the Chosen (Meghan Fitzgerald, Susann Hessen, James Huggins, Eric Minton, Neall Raemonn Price, Lauren Roy, Monica Speca, Robert Vance): A book on artifacts, including weapons and armor, various forms of miscellaneous artifacts, and Evocations (a new type of power introduced in 3rd Edition which draws upon a specific artifact), as well as 3rd Edition rules for Warstriders (the setting's term for a type of piloted mecha). 173 pages. (November 2017)
5. Dragon-Blooded: What Fire Has Wrought (Christine Beard, Jacqueline Bryk, Luka Carroll, Meghan Fitzgerald, Emily Griggs, Liz Grushcow, Susann Hessen, Alyssa Hillen, James Huggins, Sean Jaffe, Eric Minton, Robyn Ostrokol, Vivian Paul, James Pianka, Neall Raemonn Price, Charlie Raspin, Lauren Roy, Monica Speca, Robert Vance, Vera Vartanian, Pete Woodworth): 3rd Edition's main rulebook for the Dragon-Blooded. Covers character creation rules and the core Dragon-Blooded Charm set, in-universe origins and history of Dragon-Blooded, as well as their place within the setting. Covers the Realm, Lookshy, and other notable Dragon-Blooded outcaste societies. 398 pages. (April 2019)
6. The Realm (Christine Beard, Luka Carroll, Meghan Fitzgerald, Liz Grushcow, Susann Hessen, Alyssa Hillen, James Huggins, Eric Minton, Robyn Ostrokol, Neall Raemonn Price, Charlie Raspin, Lauren Roy, Allen Turner, Robert Vance, Vera Vartanian): Covers the Scarlet Empire, including the Blessed Isle, the satrapies of the Threshold and other Realm territories, the Immaculate Philosophy, the Realm's government and military, and the Dragon-Blooded Great Houses. 190 pages. (May 2019)
7. Lunars: Fangs at the Gate (Luka Carroll, Manda Collis, Roby Daquilante, Steffie de Vaan, Elliott Freeman, Emily Griggs, Liz Grushcow, James Huggins, Eric Minton, Vivian Paul, James Pianka, Neall Raemonn Price, Charlie Raspin, Lauren Roy, Monica Speca, Allen Turner, Robert Vance, Vera Vartanian): 3rd Edition's main rulebook for the Lunar Exalted, revising their place in Creation and history from their previous depictions in the previous two editions, both as a group and as individuals. 420 pages. (October 2020)
8. Dragon-Blooded: Heirs to the Shogunate (Jacqueline Bryk, Adam Carbone, Luka Carroll, Manda Collis, Steffie de Vaan, Meghan Fitzgerald, Blue Frauenglass, Elliott Freeman, Emily Griggs, James Huggins, Henrik Jäderkvist, John Matyus, Nik May, Eric Minton, Neall Raemonn Price, Liz Rogers, Lauren Roy, Myranda Sarro, Matthew Scott, John Snead, Benjamin Sousa, Amber Underwood, Robert Vance, Vera Vartanian): A companion volume to What Fire Has Wrought funded by Kickstarter stretch goals, containing extra setting information about cadet houses, the secondary schools of the Realm, Lookshy, Prasad, and various expanded and new outcaste groups. Also has additional Charms, artifacts, NPC's, and an advice on how to run the Realm Civil War, including a "War in the West" scenario. 267 pages. (September 2021)
9. Hundred-Devils Night Parade (Eric Minton, Lauren Roy, Monica Speca, Robert Vance, Vera Vartanian): A bestiary for Exalted Third Edition. Released initially a series of semi-monthly entries in June 2017 until the end of 2019. Compiled and expanded volume released in October 2021. 199 pages (October 2021)
10. Adversaries of the Righteous (Luka Carroll, Manda Collis, Roby Daquilante, Steffie de Vaan, Violet Green, Elliott Freeman, Emily Griggs, Eric Minton, Charlie Raspin, Lauren Roy, Rachel Savicki): Fully detailed NPCs and organizations intended to be used as antagonists or allies for Exalted Third Edition games. Released initially a series of semi-monthly entries in June 2017 until the end of 2019. Compiled and expanded volume released in March 2023. 199 pages. (March 2023)
11. Crucible of Legend (Jacqueline Bryk, Jacob Burgess, Rachel Cole, Meghan Fitzgerald, Elliott Freeman, Emily Griggs, Violet Green, Matt Herron, James Huggins, Charlie Raspin, Lauren Roy, James Mendez Hodes, Neall Raemonn Price, Monica Speca, H. Ulrich, and Robert Vance): A Storyteller's guide for Exalted Third Edition. Includes essays on running the game in various styles of play, addressing specific topics like the Great Cruse and mixed-Exalt type play, rules hacks for systems like Craft and character advancement, NPC creation advice, and Storytelling advice for all the canonical Exalted. Also includes prestige spreads for Alchemical, Getimian, and Infernal Exalted like those found in the Third Edition core rulebook. 159 pages. (August 2023)
12. Across the Eight Direction (Conor Anderson, Jacqueline Bryk, Adam Carbone, Dixie Cochran, Manda Collis, Roby Daquilante, Marceline Donovan-Scott, Elliott Freeman, Violet Green, Liz Grushcow, James Huggins, Henrik Jäderkvist, John Matyus, Eric Minton, MJ Monleón, Robyn Ostrokol, Neall Raemonn Price, Liz Rogers, Lauren Roy, Myranda Sarro, John Snead, Benjamin Sousa, Drew Stevens, Amber Underwood, Robert Vance): A setting supplement detailing Creation as a whole, with chapters divided amongst the cardinal and ordinal Directions of the Threshold. A spiritual successor to Scavenger Sons for Exalted Third Edition. 322 pages. (January 2024)
13. Lunars: Many-Faced Strangers (Conor Anderson, Adam Carbone, Elliott Freeman, Henrik Jäderkvist, Chazz Kellner, Danielle Lauzon, Jamie Michaels, Eric Minton, Katriel Paige, Lauren Roy, Rachel Savicki, John Snead, Gregoire Soulhier, Monica Speca, Drew Stevens, H. Ulrich, Robert Vance): A companion volume to Fangs at the Gate funded by Kickstarter stretch goals, containing extra setting information, Charms, martial arts, spells, artifacts, additional animal stat blocs, Lunar NPCs, and resources for a "War for the Caul" scenario. 236 pages. (March 2024)
14. Exigents: Out of the Ashes (Elliott Freeman, Violet Green, Emily Griggs, James Huggins, Henrik Jäderkvist, John Matyus, Eric Minton, Katriel Paige, Neall Raemonn Price, Liz Rogers, Lauren Roy, Rachel Savicki, Ben Sousa, Monica Speca, Robert Vance, Vera Vartanian): Covers one of the new types of Exalted introduced in Third Edition, who are not a single Exalted type unto themselves but the individualized and unique champions Chosen by the lesser gods of Creation. The book gives advice on creating new Charms, Exigents, and even new sorts of Exalted. Also has four fully playable sample Exigents, more information about how gods in Creation work in general, the city of Great Forks in detail, and an Appendix detailing the creation of new Exalted including three additional new sorts of optionally canon Exalted. 435 pages. (May 2024)
15. Sidereals: Charting Fate's Course (Rai W. Cole, Hiromi Cota, Elliott Freeman, Violet Green, Emily Griggs, James Huggins, John Matyus, Eric Minton, MJ Monleón, Lauren Roy, Monica Speca, Robert Vance, Vera Vartanian): Third Edition's main rulebook for Sidereal Exalted. Details the Sidereal Exalted, the Bureau of Destiny, and Heaven in context of the new edition. Also provides rules for Sidereal Martial Arts, and provides a sampling of Heavenly-related artifacts and QCs. 452 pages. (November 2024)
16. Exigents: The Three Banners Festival (Anahita Lange, John Matyus, MJ Monleón): A jumpstart adventure set in Great Forks to serve as an introduction to Exigents, including ready-made characters based on the four Exigents found in Out of the Ashes. 55 pages. (June 2025)
17. Abyssals: Sworn to the Grave (Rai Cole, Elliott Freeman, Violet Green, Alex Guerrero, James Huggins, Chazz Kellner, John Matyus, Eric Minton, MJ Monleón, Lauren Roy, JK Saavedra, Monica Speca, H. Ulrich, Robert Vance, Vera Vartanian): Third Edition's main rule book for the Abyssal Exalted, revising their place in the setting. Also includes revised descriptions of the Deathlords, the Underworld and its numerous afterlives, shadowlands, and the secrets of necromancy. Also provides a sampling of Underworld-related artifacts and QCs. 424 pages. (August 2025)
18. Exigents: Miracles of the Divine Flame (Elliott Freeman, Violet Green, Danielle Lauzon, James Huggins, Chazz Kellner, John Matyus, Eric Minton, MJ Monleón, Grégoire Soulhier, Robert Vance, Vera Vartanian): A companion volume for Exigents: Out of the Ashes, detailing additional Exigent write-ups and design seeds based on stretch goals and backer suggestions, additional Charms for the already published Exigents, new artifacts, additional example patron gods, and more details on the city of Great Forks. 215 pages. (October 2025)
19. Alchemicals: Forged by the Machine God (Elliott Freeman, Violet Green, Emily Griggs, James Huggins, Chazz Kellner, John Matyus, Eric Minton, MJ Monleón, Terry Robinson, Lauren Roy, Chris Shaffer, Charles Siegel, Drew Stevens, Monica Speca, H. Ulrich, Robert Vance): Third Edition's main rule book for the Alchemical Exalted, describing them mechanically, as well as their place within Autochthonia as well as the few left behind in Creation. Also included is a consolidated and revised take on the Autochthonia itself, its titanic biogeography, the Eight Nations, and the spirit ecology of the Realm of Brass and Shadow. Also includes new sorcery, Martial Arts styles, artifacts, and Autochthonia-related QCs. 407 pages. (August 2026)
20. Infernals: Crowned in Hellfire (manuscript available through Backerkit): Third Edition's main rule book for the Infernal Exalted. Provides rules for playing them, as well as describing their place in the Demon Realm. Includes an overview of the geography, history, and sites of Hell, as well as the Yozis and their demonic soul pantheons. Also includes new sorcery, artifacts, and QC write-ups, including demons of all three circles.

=== In development ===
1. Abyssals: Riders from the Sunless Lands (unreleased): A companion for Abyssals: Sworn to the Grave funded by Indiegogo stretch goals and limited rewards. Includes additional information about the Underworld, ghosts, and shadowlands, as well as additional Charms, necromancy initiations and spells, artifacts, and QC write-ups including additional necromantic constructs and five additional Deathlords.
2. Alchemicals: Avatars of Brass and Shadow (unreleased): A companion for Alchemicals: Forged by the Machine God funded by Backerkit stretch goals and limited backer rewards. Includes information on various notable regions and locations in Autochthon, the lost city of Tekun now found deep below Creation's surface, more on the Great Maker's pantheon of spirits, and advice for running games in Autocthhonia or interactions between the Realm of Brass and Shadow and Creation. Also includes additional Charms, artifacts, Martial Arts styles, and Autochthonia-related QCs.
3. Exigents: Champions of the Divine Flame (unreleased): A supplement containing three fully detailed Exigent write-ups. This includes the Chosen of Wounds and Chosen of Knives selected by backers of the initial crowd funding campaign for Exigents: Out of the Ashes, as well as the new March Lords.
4. Sidereals: Agents of Heaven (unreleased): A companion for Sidereals: Charting Fate's Course funded by Kickstarter stretch goals. Contains additional information about Yu-Shan and the Celestial Bureaucracy as well as additional sorcery spells, martial arts styles, artifacts, and QC write-ups of divine beings and Exalted.
5. Sidereals Jumpstart (unreleased): An introductory scenario introducing players to Sidereal characters.
6. Liminals (unreleased): Future planned crowdfunding campaign for the Liminal Exalted, the reanimated Chosen of the Dark Mother. Will have full rules for playing a Liminal, an in-depth write-up of the mortuary city of Sijan, more information on shadowlands generally, as well as new spells, martial arts, and artifacts.

=== Canceled Publications ===
The titles Different Skies, Paths of Brigid, Towers of the Mighty, and War in Heaven were previously listed on the Onyx Path website and promotional material as late as 2015. They are not listed in later product solicitations, nor are on the Onyx Path website. They no longer appear to be in development as of early 2020.

=== Official fiction ===
1. Exalted: Tale of the Visiting Flare (written by Jim Zub, John Morke; art by Hanzo Steinbach, Melissa Lee) (comic)
2. Exalted: Tales From the Age of Sorrows (Tracy Barnett, Natania Barron, Dylan Birtolo, Richard Dansky, Thoraiya Dyer, Matt Forbeck, Erin Hoffman, Haralambi Markov, Tim Pratt, Steven S. Long, Lucien Soulban, Wendy Wagner, Damien Angelica Walters) (fiction anthology)
3. Exalted: Circle of Protection (Matt Forbeck, James Huggins)
4. Exalted: False Images (Aaron Rosenberg, Lauren Roy)
5. The Silence of Our Ancstors: A Dragon-Blooded Novella (James Huggins)
6. Surface Truths: A Dragon-Blooded Novella (Lauren Roy)
7. Facets of Truth: A Lunar Novella (Aaron Rosenberg)
8. Methodology of Secrets: A Sidereal Novella (Elliot Freemen)

== Exalted: Essence (2023-present) ==
=== Currently available ===
1. Exalted: Essence (Rai W. Cole, Steffie de Vaan, Elliott Freeman, Violet Green, James Huggins, Chazz Kellner, Danielle Lauzon, Neall Raemonn Price, Lauren Roy, Monica Speca, H. Ulrich, Vera Vartanian): An alternative core rulebook, featuring a lighter system than used in Third Edition, while still being compatible with its setting. Intended for both on-boarding players new to Exalted, and facilitating games for groups consisting of diverse character types. Provides player character rules for nine exalt types, plus rules for creating player-defined Exigents. 410 pages. (June 2023)
2. Essence: Tomb of Memory (David Castro, Elliott Freeman, Alexander Guerrero, Danielle Lauzon, Monica Speca): An introductory adventure and set of ten ready-made characters to introduce new players to Exalted Essence. 81 pages. (November 2024)
3. Essence: Deeds Yet Undone (Violet Green, Danielle Lauzon, Michele Masala, JK Saavedra, H. Ulrich): A collection of three adventures for Exalted: Essence aimed towards different levels of character progression that can be run individually or together as a chronicle. 63 pages. (January 2025)
4. Essence: Pillars of Creation (Jacqueline Bryk, Jacob Burgess, David Castro, Rai W. Cole, Elliot Freeman, Violet Green, Alex Guerrero, Chazz Kellner, Danielle Lauzon, John Matyus, MJ Monleón, Lauren Roy, JK Saavedra, Monica Speca, H. Ulrich, Robert Vance): A companion volume to Exalted Essence funded by Kickstarter stretch goals. Includes extra setting information, Charms, spells, martial arts, and artifacts, non-Exalted player character rules like God-Blooded and Dragon Kings, additional Exigent and Apocryphal Exalted character options, Storyteller's advice, and NPC templates. (April 2025)
5. The Exalted: Essence Player's Guide (manuscript available through Backerkit preorder): A supplement for Exalted Essence, providing additional Charms and optional mechanics for all ten sorts of Exalted. Includes optional rules for some Exalts, as well as introducing additional sorts of Exigents to play in an Essence game..
6. The Exalted: Essence Storyteller's Guide (manuscript available through Backerkit preorder): A supplement for Storytellers running Exalted: Essence, including additional game advice, campaign seeds, rules hacks, NPC creation, and additional sample NPCs.

=== In development ===
1. Essence Enhanced (unreleased): A supplement for Exalted Essence consisting of stretch goals achieved during The Essence Player's Guide crowdfunding campaign. Will include additional Exalted and Universal Charms, as well as additional kinds of Exigents.
2. Storyteller's Guide Supplement (unreleased, title TBA): A supplment for Exalted Essence consisting of stretch goals achieved during The Exalted: Essence Storyteller's Guide crowdfunding campaign, consisting of additional antagonists and adventure seeds for the Blessed Isle and Threshold.

=== Official fiction ===
1. Scoundrelsong: An Exalted Essence Novella (James Huggins)
2. A Murder in White Whitewall: An Exalted Essence Novella (Rai W. Cole)
3. What Lies Forgotten: An Exalted Essence Novella (Lauren Roy)
4. Exalted Essence: Novella Omnibus (Rai W. Cole, James Huggins, Lauren Roy): The Exalted Essence novellas compiled into a single volume.
5. Even the Heavens Will Burn: An Exalted Essence Novella (Elliott Freeman)
6. Murder on the Divine Carriage: An Exalted Essence Novella (M.K. Anderson)
