= The World of Darkness: Storytelling System Rulebook =

Role-playing game supplement

- Publisher: White Wolf Publishing
- Publication date: 2004

The World of Darkness: Storytelling System Rulebook is a 2004 role-playing game supplement published by White Wolf Publishing for the World of Darkness.

== Contents ==
The World of Darkness: Storytelling System Rulebook is the core rulebook for the World of Darkness and is necessary to run a game of Vampire: The Requiem, Werewolf: The Forsaken, Promethean: The Created, or Mage: The Awakening.

== Publication history ==
Shannon Appelcine stated that as the World of Darkness setting was published as a new rule system known as the Storytelling System, that "This new setting and rule system were combined in a single game book, The World of Darkness (2004), developed by Bill Bridges and Ken Cliffe. This showed off another difference in the new game: it was centered on a single rulebook for all the old games — conquering the problems that the Classic World of Darkness had with its 5+ different rule systems. White Wolf showed how the new line would work by simultaneously releasing Vampire: The Requiem (2004), a sourcebook that supplemented The World of Darkness by offering up all the rules needed to play a Vampire in the setting. A new Vampire product line soon followed, edited by former Atlas Games employee Will Hindmarch."

== Reception ==
=== Awards ===
The World of Darkness: Storytelling System Rulebook won a 2004 Gamers' Choice Award at the Origins Awards.

The World of Darkness won the 2005 Silver ENnie Awards for Best Writing and Best Game.

=== Reviews ===
- Backstab #51
- Pyramid
- Rebel Times #5.
