= Conrad Hubbard =

Role-playing game designer

Conrad Hubbard is best known as a game designer, web designer, and author for White Wolf, Inc.

== Author credits ==
Published material by Conrad Hubbard consists of contributions to more than 35 books which are classified as roleplaying game books, published by White Wolf Publishing and Sword & Sorcery Studios.

Books which Conrad Hubbard has contributed to include:

=== World of Darkness titles ===
- Mokole (a Changing Breed book)
- Sorcerer: Revised Edition
- Mummy: The Resurrection
- Mage Storytellers Handbook
- Mummy Players Guide
- Laws of the Resurrection
- The Fallen Tower: Las Vegas
- Vampire Players Guide
- The Red Sign
- Ascension
- Second Sight
- Promethean: The Created

=== d20 System titles ===
- Relics & Rituals
- Creature Collection 2: Dark Menagerie
- The Wise and the Wicked
- The Divine and the Defeated
- Scarred Lands Campaign Setting: Ghelspad
- Secrets and Societies
- Scarred Lands Campaign Setting: Termana
- Strange Lands: Lost Tribes of the Scarred Lands

=== Exalted titles ===
- Creatures of the Wyld
- The Tomb of 5 Corners (free download at White Wolf's website)
- Exalted Second Edition
- Manual of Exalted Power: Dragon-Blooded
- Manual of Exalted Power: Lunars
- Book of Sorcery, vol.3: Oadenol's Codex
- Compass of Terrestrial Directions, vol.2: The West
- Manual of Exalted Power: Sidereals

=== Trinity Universe titles ===
- Hidden Agendas
- Trinity Technology Manual
- Trinity: Battleground
- Trinity Battleground Players Guide (unpublished release downloadable from White Wolf's site)

=== Concept and design credits ===
Books which Conrad Hubbard has helped with concept and design include:

- The World of Darkness core rulebook
- Vampire: The Requiem
- Werewolf: The Forsaken
- Mage: The Awakening
- Promethean: The Created
- Changeling: The Lost

== Web design ==
As a web designer for White Wolf, Conrad Hubbard led the production of a text-based online chat based role-playing game set in the World of Darkness, fictional New Bremen, Georgia. The New Bremen chat used off the shelf software called Digichat (a product of Digi-Net Technologies, Inc.), supplemented with a database that stored characters and the Storytellers approvals thereof and notes pertaining to them.

Over the years after the introduction of New Bremen, White Wolf opened multiple roleplaying game chat settings using a similar model.

The roster of moderated White Wolf RPG Chat settings included:

- New Bremen (for a mixed classic World of Darkness venue)
- World of Darkness: Chicago (for a mixed new World of Darkness venue)
- City of the Damned: New Orleans (for Vampire: The Requiem)
- Hunting Grounds: The Rockies (for Werewolf: The Forsaken)
- Boston Unveiled (for Mage: The Awakening)
- Nexus (mixed venue Exalted Second Edition)
- The Blessed Isle (Dragon-Blooded Exalted Second Edition chronicle)
- Fangsfall (for d20 System Scarred Lands)
- Jade City (mixed venue Exalted First Edition)
- Dark Ages Bremen (Dark Ages games)
- Rookhausen (for d20 System Ravenloft)
- Trinity Universe

Additionally, White Wolf hosted unmoderated chat room areas, where people could join to run their own roleplaying games using the same software and database design as the moderated rooms.

== See also ==
- List of Exalted sourcebooks
