= Wraith: The Great War =

1999 role-playing book

- Cover art
- Designers: Bruce Baugh, E. Jonathan Bennett, Mark Cenczyk, Richard Dansky, Geoff Grabowski, Dawn Kahan, John Maurer, John Moore, Greg Stolze
- Publishers: White Wolf Publishing
- Publication: May 1999
- Systems: Storyteller System
- Series: World of Darkness
- ISBN: 1-56504-634-X

Wraith: The Great War is a role-playing book published by White Wolf Publishing in May 1999.

== Description ==
Wraith: The Great War is a historical setting developed for Wraith: The Oblivion, which is set during and immediately after World War I.

== Publication history ==
White Wolf Publishing announced in 1998 that they were reorganizing their business, and the Wraith: The Oblivion line was cancelled the following year as a result. White Wolf followed the game up with a related historical role-playing game in April 1999, Wraith: The Great War, which was published as a one-off game, unlike the other historical role-playing games which the company was publishing for the other World of Darkness lines at that time.

== Reception ==
SF Site thought the game had a great narrative pull, and that it was the kind of supplement that made them want to play Wraith: The Oblivion.

== Reviews ==
- Casus Belli #120
