= Grace O'Connell =

American biomechanical engineer

Grace D. O'Connell
- Education: University of Pennsylvania, University of Maryland
- Scientific career
- Fields: Mechanical engineering, Bio-engineering
- Thesis: (2009)
- Doctoral advisor: Dawn Elliott

Grace D. O'Connell is an American biomechanical engineer known for her research on the biomechanics of the human spine, on the degeneration and regeneration of spinal tissue, and on the comparison of its properties with the spines of animals used in the study of lumbar disc disease. She is an associate professor of mechanical engineering at the University of California, Berkeley, where she also held the Don M. Cunningham Chair in Mechanical Engineering.

== Education and career ==
O'Connell was a high school student at Upper Darby High School in Pennsylvania. After being inspired by a high school engineering class, and also taking flying lessons as a high school student, O'Connell began an aerospace engineering program at Virginia Tech and then transferred to the University of Maryland, College Park, graduating in 2004. She earned a Ph.D. in bioengineering in 2009 from the University of Pennsylvania, supervised by Dawn Elliott.

She was a postdoctoral researcher with Clark Hung at Columbia University from 2009 to 2013 before joining the University of California, Berkeley faculty. She has also held an adjunct faculty position in the Department of Orthopedic Surgery at the University of California, San Francisco since 2017. At Berkeley, she was promoted to a tenured associate professorship in 2019. In 2021 she was named as associate dean for inclusive excellence in the UC Berkeley College of Engineering.

== Research ==
In 2024, O'Connell helped author a research article about how deep learning can enable accurate soft tissue tendon deformation using ultrasound imaging. This is important due to it allowing early and accurate detection of tissue deformation in vivo tissue due to its limited image signal-to-noise ratio.

In 2025, O'Connell helped author a research article, based on how rodents can be used to understand the effects of space flight on the human body. This helped with researchers understanding of spaceflights effects on the human spine and musculoskeletal system. The results were that the rodents spine was not affected by the gravitational unloading suggests that there are little degeneration of the spinal cells caused due to spaceflights.

== Outreach ==
O'Connell is a member of the National Society of Black Engineers and the Society of Women Engineers. As a woman of color in engineering, she has been sensitive to the challenges faced by minorities in engineering and has worked to improve the diversity of the field. Her work in this area has included serving as an advisor for the Berkeley Society of Women Engineers and Black Engineering and Science Student Association, and leading the Berkeley Girls in Engineering Program.

== Recognition ==
O'Connell was the 2019 recipient of the Y. C. Fung Young Investigator Award of the American Society of Mechanical Engineers, named for her "pioneering work in multiscale mechanics of musculoskeletal soft tissues". She was named as a Fellow of the American Institute for Medical and Biological Engineering in 2021 "for outstanding contributions to understanding biomechanical degeneration and failure of fiber-reinforced biological tissues by creating integrated computational and experimental approaches".

Upper Darby High School named her to their alumni wall of fame in 2021. In 2022, O'Connell received the early career distinguished alumni award from the College of Engineering at the University of Maryland.

In 2025, O'Connell was the recipient of the U.S. National Science Foundation's Presidential Early Career Award for Scientists and Engineers.
