= Geoffrey C. Grabowski =

American role-playing game designer

- Born: 1973
- Occupation: Game designer

Geoffrey C. Grabowski is a role-playing game designer and writer, known primarily as line developer for the 1st edition of the Exalted RPG for White Wolf games from 2001 through 2006. He was described as the "guiding force" of the first edition.

== Career ==
Geoffrey C. Grabowski was also the founder of "Project Redcap" in 1994, an early directory of Ars Magica resources on the www. Grabowski subsequently contributed to the Fourth Edition of Ars Magica published by Atlas Games, and published two co-authored books for Jonathan Tweet's Everway RPG with Nicole Lindroos and Greg Stolze, the Realms of the Sun. His scenario included in One Shots, published by Atlas for the Unknown Armies RPG, featured fictionalized versions of RPG designers Richard Dansky and Jenna K. Moran; he also contributed fiction to John Tynes' Delta Green anthology, Alien Intelligence, for Pagan Publishing.

In the late 1990s Grabowski became increasingly central to the game lines published by White Wolf, writing books for Hunter: The Reckoning, Kindred of the East, Vampire: The Masquerade, and Wraith: The Oblivion game lines. Subsequently, he moved from freelance author to line developer, working on the Exalted property. Alongside John Chambers, he developed the first edition of the Exalted RPG and became solo line developer for the remainder of its initial run, setting the direction and publishing schedule of the line. In this role Grabowski outlined, commissioned and developed about three dozen books published for the first edition of Exalted, from 2001 through 2006.

In 2004, two supplements were nominated for Ennie Awards: the Exalted Players Guide, and Exalted: Sidereals, although neither won.

Following successful Kickstarter campaigns, Grabowski wrote and published The Dreams of Ruin, an "old school RPG sourcebook", and contributed to the third edition of Exalted, which raised over $600,000 in 2014, a record at the time.

== Reception ==
Contemporary reviewers noted that Grabowski's work on Exalted moved the genre of fantasy roleplaying games forwards:

White Wolf's Exalted is a major step forward in their game design, and the attention paid to the mechanics and playtesting shows. Exalted is a truly different setting, operating on different principles and a different power level than anything I’ve seen.

Gaming critic Ken Hite noted in a review in his regular Out Of The Box column at the time that Grabowski's work seemed to be aggressively resisting the traditional tropes of fantasy gaming:

At every turn, one can sense developer Geoff Grabowski tearing out fugitive Tolkienisms and un-Middling the Earth as best he could. The attempt is to create a wuxia (or anime) Xothique, and if you just went "Wha?" then Grabowski has you where he wants you, at the door to his world with a sense of curiosity, if not wonder. The world is ornate, almost Orientalist, with that quasi-decadent feeling that Clark Ashton Smith and Gene Wolfe do so well; mingled with computer-game kung fu mechanics to replicate figures out of heroic myth. It's a tribute to Grabowski's aesthetics that it mostly works.

This impression was backed up by colleague Ethan Skemp:

Geoff is really sick of medieval fantasy, so there's none of that in there (except swords and armour and stuff, which are hardly limited to medieval-style fantasy settings).

== Game books ==
=== Ars Magica, Everway, Unknown Armies, and Feng Shui ===
- Houses of Hermes (1994) for Ars Magica, contributing author
- Ars Magica, Fourth Edition (1996), design contribution and contributing author
- Realms of the Sun Book One: Bright Fires (1997) for Everway with Nicole Lindroos
- Realms of the Sun Book Two: Bright Fires (1997) for Everway with Greg Stolze
- One Shots (1999) for Unknown Armies with Greg Stolze, John Tynes, Tim Dedopulos, and Nicole Lindroos
- Golden Comeback (2000) for Feng Shui with Greg Stolze, Bruce Baugh, Tim Dedopulos, and Rob Heinsoo
- Elevator to the Netherworld (2000) for Feng Shui, contributing author

=== World of Darkness ===
- Doomslayers: Into the Labyrinth (1998) for Wraith: The Oblivion with Bruce Baugh and Fred Yelk
- Guide to the Camarilla (1999) for Vampire: The Masquerade with Richard Dansky, Kenneth Hite, Clayton Oliver and Cynthia Summers
- Ends of Empire (1999) for Wraith: The Oblivion with Bruce Baugh, Richard Dansky, and Ed Huang
- The Book of Legions (1999) for Wraith: The Oblivion, contributing author
- Wraith: The Great War (1999), contributing author
- Hunter: The Reckoning (1999), contributing author
- Dharma Book: Devil Tigers (1999) for Kindred of the East
- Thousand Hells (1999) for Kindred of the East
- Wolves of the Sea (1999) for Vampire: The Dark Ages with Jason Langlois
- The Ashen Thief (2000) for Vampire: The Dark Ages with Sara Roark
- Nights of Prophecy (2000) for Vampire: The Masquerade, contributing author
- Vampire Storyteller's Handbook, Revised (2000), contributing author
- Dharma Book: Thrashing Dragons (2001) for Kindred of the East
- Werewolf Storyteller's Handbook, Revised (2002), contributing author
- Guide to the Anarchs (2002) for Vampire: The Masquerade, contributing author
- Heresies of the Way (2002) for Kindred of the East
- World of Darkness: Ghost Stories (2004), contributing author

=== Exalted ===
- Manacle and Coin (2003) with John Snead, Malcolm Sheppard, and Ian Eller
- Exalted: the Sidereals (2003) with Bryan Armor, R. Sean Borgstrom, and Steve Kenson
- Blood & Salt (2004) with Genevieve Cogman, Ian Eller, and Michael Kessler
- Bastions of the North (2005) Kraig Blackwelder, Genevieve Cogman, and Andrew Watt
- Exalted, Third Edition (2016) with Eric Brennan, Manda Collis, and Meghan Fitzgerald

=== OSR Games ===
- The Dreams of Ruin (2015)
