= Promethean: The Created =

Tabletop role-playing game

- Cover art
- Designers: Bill Bridges, Conrad Hubbard
- Publishers: White Wolf, Onyx Path
- Publication: August 11, 2006 (First Edition); August 3, 2016 (Second Edition)
- Genres: Personal Horror
- Systems: Storytelling System

Promethean: The Created is a role-playing game published by White Wolf, set in the Chronicles of Darkness setting.

The game is inspired by the classic tales of Frankenstein's monster, the Golem and other such simulacra. The characters are individuals created by first dismembering and reassembling a human corpse in most cases or multiple corpses in others to form a human body, then animating the body with Pyros, the Divine Fire. The resulting creation is known as a Promethean. Animated by the Divine Fire, but lacking a soul, Prometheans seek the greatest prize they know: humanity. Prometheans have no direct equivalent in the original World of Darkness (though beings like Frankenstein's monster, as well as the ability to create and play as such, were associated with the Sons of Ether), but elements of the game, on the surface, recall elements of such games as Wraith: The Oblivion and Mummy: The Resurrection.

== The life of a Promethean ==
A Promethean is created from the corpse of a human by a creator; in certain cases, desired components from more than one corpse are combined into a single end-product. Very rarely, otherwise inanimate matter may be used, making a sort of magical android similar to a Golem but with considerably greater variation in form and composition. Most Prometheans are created by other Prometheans, who must create more of their kind as part of their journey towards achieving a state of true mortality. Much less common are instances where mortal creators wield the Divine Fire in order to create a new form of life; these mortals are known as demiurges, and are the most likely to create new types or Lineages of Prometheans. When a Promethean is brought into the world, they often have full knowledge of any languages their body spoke in life, and the processes necessary to control the body (hand-eye coordination, basic visual navigation, etc.). In all other aspects, they are a blank slate, although individuals may discover "memories" of skills, locations, knowledge, etc. once possessed by the mortal(s) whose bodies they now use. Some Prometheans aid their progeny in learning the basics needed to survive in the world; others leave them to figure things out on their own. There are also cases when the maker is destroyed by one means or another before the progeny wakes.

The Promethean is not human, in either the physiological or cognitive sense. It is a corpse that walks, its autonomic functions and soul replaced by the power of the Divine Fire. While the Divine Fire allows him to pass as a human from a distance, it does not make up for the lack of a soul. When a Promethean spends enough time around humans, the humans begin to fall prey to Disquiet, the feeling that there is something not just fundamentally different, but utterly wrong about the Promethean. Disquiet initially manifests itself as distrust or avoidance of the Promethean; at its worst, it can blossom into mindless rage that can only be abated by the death of the Promethean. Different Promethean Lineages generate different manifestations of Disquiet, each with their own enervating effect on the local environment and population. Disquiet affects more than just mortals; a Promethean who spends too long in one place will find the landscape and environment itself becoming tainted by his Disquiet, eventually turning into a Wasteland. Leaving the tainted zone far behind allows the land to eventually heal, but it does require the Promethean to keep on the move.

There is only one true means by which to truly escape from Disquiet: attaining mortality. Such an act requires years of dedication, but it is possible for Prometheans. By undertaking the Pilgrimage, the Promethean gains knowledge of his self, other Prometheans, and humanity as a whole. The various steps of the Pilgrimage vary widely from one Promethean to the next, but one step remains constant and inviolable: the creation of another Promethean of their line. The Pilgrimage is difficult and lengthy, but it can be achieved.

It is worth noting that the understanding and becoming of humanity can just as easily refer to the baser and worse of human impulses as to the noble and good - although those Prometheans that actually perform reprehensible acts (murder, stealing, etc.) are less likely to successfully complete the Pilgrimage.

== Lineages ==
Each Promethean takes on the traits of the progenitor, the first of their kind. The various Lineages of Prometheans take their roots from notable "Created" or "reconstructed" throughout folklore and fiction. The five original Lineages are also aligned towards one of the five classical elements, and, in keeping with the alchemical theme of the game, are imbalanced towards one of the respective humors. Two additional Lineages revolving around alternate circumstances of creation were added in the second edition. The Lineages consist of:

- Frankensteins, otherwise known as "the Wretched." The story of their creation follows Mary Shelley's novel, with a few distinguishing variations: Frankenstein created his monster using a mixture of current scientific knowledge and Paracelsian alchemy, and the monster survived the death of his creator to create others like himself. Frankensteins are created by taking the best parts from multiple corpses, assembling a patchwork man from said parts, then animating it through a mixture of the Divine Fire and electricity. Frankensteins are aligned with the element of fire and are imbalanced towards choler, and are thus driven towards vengeance and ambition. Frankensteins are also known for their massive strength. A Frankenstein named "Verney," who may be the original progenitor of his Lineage created by Victor Frankenstein, appears in the game's framing fiction, providing the point of view throughout the corebook.
- Galateids, otherwise known as "Muses." Like their progenitor, they are known for their beauty and want of companionship; unlike their progenitor, they are not fashioned from stone, but rather from the unmarred corpse of a beautiful youth. Less commonly, they are built from two or more corpses possessed of components (eyes, hands, legs, etc.) considered beautiful by the Promethean Maker. They are walking contradictions, attracting people through their beauty while driving them away with Disquiet. Galateids are aligned with the element of air and are imbalanced towards blood, often making them courageous and amorous. A Galateid named "The Hangman's Beautiful Daughter" appears in the game's framing fiction, providing the point of view throughout Strange Alchemies.
- Osirans, otherwise known as "Nepri." The Osirans draw from their legacy as "children of a god" and often carry themselves with regal bearing, expecting others to follow them and bow to their wills. Another element they share with their progenitor is an incomplete body; as in the legend of the resurrection of Osiris, the creation of a Nepri involves the division of the body into 13 parts, the "least" of which (decided upon by the creator and not limited to the piece that Isis "could not find" in the original legend, i.e. his penis) is thrown away, and reassembly of the remaining 12. Osirans are aligned with the element of water and are imbalanced towards phlegm, giving them a tendency to seem cold and uncaring to others. An Osiran named "Dr. Brine" appears in the game's framing fiction, especially throughout Pandora's Book.
- Tammuz, otherwise known as "Golems" in the first edition and "the Named" in the second edition, received the largest changes between the editions of the games. In the first edition, Golems draw their history from conflicting tales, one Hebrew in origin, the other resting in the Babylonian myth of Tammuz. Nevertheless, the stories share one common element: rejection of the bonds of slavery. The Tammuz loathe slavery in all its forms, and wish to achieve mortality in order to break away from the fierce restrictions that Disquiet confers upon them. Golems are not created directly from clay, as in Jewish folklore; rather, a body is imbued with the Divine Fire and buried in the earth. Once the Tammuz awakens, it is his duty to claw his way out and face his new life. Tammuz are aligned with the element of earth and are imbalanced towards melancholy, making them both introspective and prone to fierce rage. They are also known for their seemingly limitless stamina. The second edition version of the Tammuz removed the slavery aspect of the Lineage and focuses solely on the Babylonian myth; they are now dedicated workaholics who are obsessed with language. In order for them to achieve New Dawn, they often have to learn to stop working constantly and focus on themselves. A Tammuz named "John Ash" appears in the game's framing fiction, especially throughout Saturnine Night.
- Ulgan, otherwise known as "Riven." The Ulgan's origins lie in shamanism, drawing from an initiation rite in which the hopeful shaman's spiritual body is torn apart by hungry spirits and reconstructed piece by piece. Sometimes, the rite goes horribly awry, and the young initiate's physical body is torn to pieces as well. The remains, when stitched together and reanimated, produce a Riven, who can perceive and interact with the realm of ghosts and spirits. The occurrence of the rite in the life of the corpse is not necessary, as long as it is replicated in death by the Ulgan's creator. Some Ulgans draw their origins from the legend of Orpheus, who they claim was brought back to life after being torn apart by the Maenads. Ulgans are aligned with the element of spirit and are imbalanced towards ectoplasm, driving them towards intuitive and instinctual thought and action. An Ulgan named "Zo Malak" appears in the game's framing fiction, providing the point of view throughout Magnum Opus.
- The Unfleshed, also known as "Manufactured", originally appeared in the Saturnine Night sourcebook and were added as a standard Lineage in the second edition. They are mechanical inventions animated by the Divine Fire and given life. The Divine Fire gives them human form and shape, but underneath the illusion, they are still mechanical. In the first edition, each Unfleshed has a different elemental imbalance; thus, each one produces different forms of Disquiet and suffers different forms of Torment. The Unfleshed can claim any Transmutation, including those favored by Pandorans, as their Bestowment, and can carry devices from their lives as a machine within their body. They can be considered an expansion of the "Constructs," otherwise ordinary Prometheans created from or incorporating inorganic matter (such as a Galateid actually carved from stone). The second edition gives them their own humor, oil, and the slavery role originally held by the Tammuz. They now have a common form of Disquiet, must follow Refinements as other Prometheans do, and may no longer freely pick from any Transmutations.
- The Extempore, also called "Matchless", are the new Lineage added by the second edition. Extempore are aberrant, one-of-a-kind Prometheans who were formed by circumstance, usually involving nature, disasters, or, on rare occasions, Firestorms. Occasionally, some established Lineage creation rituals go just wrong enough to make the Extempore different from the intended Lineage. They usually do not have a progenitor, and may not even be made of anything human. Extempore can have any of the established humors, or may have something different all together like lava or seawater. They may also have any of the Bestowments of the other Lineages, or something unique to them. They usually face their paths with more uncertainty than the other Lineages, as they are truly unique and have no established examples to follow.

Four other Lineages appear in other materials:

- Zeky, singular Zeka, first appeared in Saturnine Night and exist as urban legends amongst Prometheans. They are Prometheans animated by nuclear energy. They can spend very little time near humans, as their Disquiet transforms fertile land into a radioactive Wasteland, as well as making humans extremely paranoid about being attacked from outside. The Zeky are constantly in pain from the nuclear energy that burns through their body; as a result, many forsake the Great Work and embrace the path of Centimanus. The Zeky have three different possible Bestowments, including the ability to animate corpses through nuclear energy, the ability to metamorphose into a "Hiroshima shadow" in order to prevent the spread of Disquiet, and the ability to draw Pyros from nuclear energy. In addition to these Bestowments, a Zeka can use the Irradiation Transmutations, focused on the manipulation of nuclear energy, without fear of losing their humanity.
- Hollows, also called "Skeletons" or "Beggars", appear in the Chronicles of Darkness: Dark Eras sourcebook; they are Prometheans created by the unique circumstances of deprivation. Eternally hungry for something, they always seek to sate their desires, be they physical or emotional. The Hollows formed and were at their peak during the American Dust Bowl; subsequently, they became extinct as the circumstances that allowed their creation disappeared with the rains that returned fertility to the Midwest.
- Amirani, nicknamed "Prophets," are an extinct lineage introduced in the Chronicles of Darkness: Dark Eras Companion sourcebook; they were the choler-associated Lineage that predated the Frankensteins. Their generative rite made use of the body of a person who died a violent death, reinforced physically and alchemically with metal, and were granted a vision of the Divine Fire on generation, driving them to change the world, to try and make it a better place. The body of the final Amirani was reportedly used to create Adam, the first member of the Frankenstein lineage.
- The Faceless, also called the "Tortured Ones," were introduced in the Chronicles of Darkness: Dark Eras 2 sourcebook. They were a lineage created from the bodies of soldiers killed by artillery shells and poison gas in the trenches of World War I, and experienced constant agony, as the pain of their original death never left them. Initially created by accident when lighting struck a pile of mud soaked corpses, both sides in the war attempted to create more as super soldiers.

== Refinements ==
During the course of a Promethean's journey towards mortality, they must dedicate themselves towards a Refinement. A Refinement is equal parts philosophy and alchemical regimen, framing the Promethean's outlook on humanity and their own existence as well as granting them knowledge of Transmutations, the ability to alchemically alter the properties of their bodies and Pyros to great effect. It is expected that a Promethean will change Refinements at least once in their journey. There exist eleven Refinements, but only ten are viewed as "acceptable" by most Prometheans. The original five Refinements drew their names from five of the seven planetary metals; rarer paths based on the properties of other alchemical metals were added later in the book Magnum Opus and in the game's second edition. The second edition further split the Refinements into two types: simple and complex; new Prometheans must always start on a simple Refinement, and no Promethean may have more complex Refinements learned in their lifetime than simple. Each Refinement also has three roles associated with it, which serve as different viewpoints on how the ideas of the Refinement can be used.

The simple Refinements are:

- Aurum, the Refinement of Gold, or Mortality. The Refinement of Aurum requires the study of humanity: their cultures, their beliefs, their emotions, and their actions. Truly "understanding" humanity may take many routes, some as benign as attending church services, others as horrific as committing cold-blooded murder in order to understand why humans do the same. Those who practice Aurum gain an affinity towards the Transmutations of Deception (using Pyros to escape the notice of others) and Mesmerism (using Pyros to subtly gain control of the emotions and thoughts of others). Practitioners are often called Mimics or Adamists.
- Cuprum, the Refinement of Copper, or Self. Practitioners of Cuprum wish to gain total control of their bodies, their minds, and hopefully their Torment, in order to ease the control their humors have over their bodies and the toll their Disquiet takes on the land. Many followers of the Refinement take to isolation in nature, avoiding the "threat" that humans affected by Disquiet pose towards them. Those who practice Cuprum gain an affinity towards the Transmutations of Metamorphosis (using Pyros to shapeshift) and Sensorium (using Pyros to enhance the senses beyond physical limits). Practitioners are often called Pariahs or Eremites.
- Ferrum, the Refinement of Iron, or Corpus. Those who practice Ferrum follow the path of the practiced warrior, believing that they can earn the trust of humans through martial prowess and the necessity for defenders in times of crisis. Practitioners of the Refinement often learn as much from martial arts and military training as their Disquiet allows them to do. Those who practice Ferrum gain an affinity towards the Transmutations of Corporeum (using Pyros to power and harden the body) and Vitality (using Pyros to perform unnatural feats of strength). Practitioners are often called Titans.
- Plumbum, the Refinement of Lead, or Source; it originally appeared as a rare Refinement in Magnum Opus before being grouped with the simple ones in the second edition. Practitioners of Lead believe that, before they attain Mortality, they must understand what it means to be a Promethean. They wish to understand what they are, how they do what they do, the history of the Great Work, and the various threats Prometheans face in daily existence. Those who practice Plumbum gain an affinity towards the Transmutations of Disquietism (controlling the flow of Disquiet to redirect its effects towards humans and away from the Promethean, or easing its influence all together) and Saturninus (control over one's own Azothic Radiance, their humors, and their Bestowments). Practitioners are often referred to as Originists.
- Stannum, the Refinement of Tin, or Torment. Disciples of Stannum have most likely witnessed first hand the horrible effects that Disquiet has on humans; often, they have been the target of that very rage. They believe that the best course of action is to get even, cultivating the flow of Disquiet and gaining revenge on those who have wronged them. Many Prometheans likely practice Stannum at some point in their journeys, but many outside of the Refinement view it as a "youthful rebellion" at best, and an obsession at worst. Those who practice Stannum gain an affinity towards the Transmutations of Disquietism and Electrification (using Pyros to generate electricity). Practitioners are often called Furies.

The Complex Refinements are:

- Aes, the Refinement of Bronze, or Aid. Practitioners of Aes have sworn to protect their throng mates and other Prometheans in need. The practitioner usually serves both to protect their throng mates from physical harm and to keep them devoted to the Great Work. The Refinement can't be practiced alone, however, as it requires the Promethean to protect those close to themselves. Those who practice Aes gain an affinity towards the Transmutations of Benefice (providing aid to another Promethean) and Corporeum. Practitioners are often referred to as Sentries.
- Argentum, the Refinement of Silver, or Mystery. Practitioners of Argentum have discovered that they are not the only monsters in the Chronicles of Darkness. There also exist vampires, werewolves, mages, and things unknown. The practitioner of Argentum seeks to understand humanity by understanding its opposites. It observes the various other supernatural creatures of the Chronicles of Darkness, as well as mortals who are mentally ill, in an attempt to discern the secrets of the works. Those who practice Argentum gain an affinity towards the Transmutations of Sensorium and Spiritus (using Pyros to blend in with and rebuff other supernaturals). Practitioners are often referred to as Mystics.
- Cobalus, the Refinement of Cobalt, or Impurity. Practitioners of Cobalus have realized that certain parts of Promethean existence, such as Disquiet and Torment, are impurities that keep them separate from humanity. As a result, they seek to understand imperfection in all its forms - in their selves, in objects, and in humanity. Unlike Centimani, they do not spurn humanity; rather, they seek to truly understand what humanity is by examining the flaws of human existence. Those who practice Cobalus gain an affinity towards the Transmutations of Contamination (drawing out and purging the imperfections of humans and Prometheans) and Deception. Practitioners are often referred to as Cathars.
- Mercurius, the Refinement of Quicksilver, or Pyros; it was originally one of the common Refinements in the first edition, but in the second edition it was moved to the complex category. Followers of Mercurius believe that for Prometheans to understand what makes a mortal a being with a soul, they must first understand that which serves as a replacement in themselves: the Divine Fire. To gain such an understanding, they often demonstrate a moral, intellectual and spiritual flexibility unmatched by other Prometheans, pursuing whatever avenues they believe might lead towards enlightenment. Those who practice Mercurius gain an affinity towards the Transmutations of Alchemicus (using Pyros to alchemically analyze and metamorphose objects) and Vulcanus (controlling the very flow of Pyros through their bodies and bodies of others, using it to fantastical effect). Practitioners are often called Ophidians.
- Phosphorum, the Refinement of Phosphorus, or Ephemerality; this is the only completely new Refinement to appear in the second edition. Those who follow Phosphorum try to understand mortality by living life on the edge, always taking chances and putting themselves at risk so they can try to understand the very nature of death. They will push the boundaries or die trying, and do it all with a passion or joy not normally seen in Prometheans. The path of Phosphorum gives access to the Transmutations Luciferus and Vulcanus. For the way they burn bright or flame out, practitioners are often called Light-Bringers.

A final Refinement is Centimani, the Refinement of Flux. Taking their name from the Hundred-Handed of Greek mythology, the followers of Centimani study Flux, the force of destruction that acts as the opposite of Pyros. Many Centimani are viewed as monsters by other Prometheans due to the fact that they have effectively abandoned the pursuit of mortality and have firmly embraced the belief that they are monsters. If this was not enough, the study of Flux often brings Centimani into close association with Pandorans. These creatures study monsters among humanity - serial killers, rapists, and criminals - as well as manipulating their own monstrous forms. In the original edition, Prometheans were allowed to follow Centimani as a step along their Great Work, but the second edition changed it so that Centimani are no longer on a Pilgrimage at all, their progress towards their Magnum Opus completely arrested until they go back to a proper Refinement path.

== Pandorans ==
In the pursuit of mortality, one step must be undertaken by all Prometheans: the creation of another Promethean of their line. There are times, however, when the creator is not fully prepared to bring a new life into the world, doing so out of haste, impatience or selfishness rather than necessity. When this occurs, the process of creating new life becomes tainted; Flux takes the place of Pyros, and a Pandoran is created. Most Pandorans exist as mindless entities driven solely by instinct; there are the occasional few, however, who attain full sentience and possess human levels of intelligence. These Pandorans are known as Sublimati.

All Pandorans center their existences around one goal: the acquisition of Pyros to feed upon. Pandorans react strongly to the flow of Pyros, awakening from states of dormancy induced by mortal Disquiet (in which the Pandoran appears as a statue or similar object) and chase after the source of flame. If a Pandoran is successful in its hunt, it will likely kill and cannibalize the Promethean. Some Pandorans keep their quarries alive but helpless, feeding off the Promethean's constantly regenerating Pyros. Originally, each Pandoran existed as a Mockery of a Lineage, sharing similar elemental alignments and humorous imbalances as their creators. In the second edition, Pandorans are no longer typed by Mockery. The Mockeries were:

- Ishtari (the Mockery of the Golems, given to imprisoning their foes and keeping them alive as long as possible while feeding on their Pyros)
- Renders (the Mockery of the Riven, tending to tear apart the Promethean quickly and drain the Pyros from what remains)
- Sebek (the Mockery of the Nepri, given to inhabiting watery environments and drowning their prey quickly)
- The Silent (the Mockery of the Muses, tending to mutilate and disfigure their prey)
- The Torch-Born (the Mockery of the Wretched, given to charring the flesh of their prey before consuming it)
- Gremlins (the Mockery of the Unfleshed)
- Carcinoma (the Mockery of the Zeka)
- Dust Devils (the Mockery of the Hollows, who trap their prey and eat only enough to sate themselves before wandering off)

Ironically, the bane of Prometheans' existence, Disquiet, is the most effective weapon against Pandorans, as a Pandoran subjected to the attention of a mortal (and the Disquiet thereby generated) for more than a short span of time will be forced into a physically inert state of dormancy, as well as physically transmuted into some form of stone. Many Pandorans remain this way for centuries, as only close proximity to a source of Pyros (such as a Promethean, Firestorm, or qashmallim) will rouse them.

== Qashmallim ==
The Qashmallim are powerful manifestations of the Divine Fire, seemingly angelic beings who exist to carry out a single mission on behalf of something they call simply "The Principle." They are bringers of visions and messengers of doom, givers of hope and swords of retribution. Each qashmal vanishes after carrying out its task or if it failed in the attempt, and they never try again.

Just as the Divine Fire itself is mysterious and ineffable, the qashmallim are unfathomable and their motives impenetrable. One qashmal might be dispatched to warn a person of impending danger, even as another is urging a separate person to bring about that danger. Even as they may work at cross-purposes, they also seem to be divided into two general Choirs:

- The Elpidos serve Elpis, promoting change, creativity, and fertility even as they punish and warn. They can be both benefactors and scourges to humans and Created alike.
- The Lilithim serve Flux, encouraging waste, corruption, and mutation. They are capable of awakening and commanding Pandorans, and pursue the cause of metamorphosis for its own sake.

== Books ==
- Promethean: The Created. White Wolf. August 2006. ISBN 1-58846-606-X. WW60000. The core rulebook.
- Pandora's Book. White Wolf. October 2006. ISBN 1-58846-488-1. WW60300. Information on the creatures of Flux and Pyros, the Pandorans, as well as the Qashmallim and new enemies for the Created.
- Strange Alchemies. White Wolf. November 2006. ISBN 1-58846-607-8. WW60100. Detailed discussion of the existing Lineages and Refinements. New Transmutations and Bestowments. Discussions of important issues in Promethean campaigns.
- Magnum Opus. White Wolf. February 2007. ISBN 978-1-58846-608-2. WW60101. The living history of the Created, new Refinements, discussion of the Pilgrimage.
- Saturnine Night. White Wolf. March 2007. ISBN 978-1-58846-609-9. WW60301. New lineages, rules for creating new lineages and support for long term Promethean campaigns.
- To The Flame. White Wolf. August 2008. WW60102. Storytelling Action System adventure (PDF Only)
- Ready-Made Player Characters: The Refuse July 2009.
- Character Sheet Pad. White Wolf. September 2006. ISBN 1-58846-544-6. WW60700.
- Storyteller's Screen. White Wolf. September 2006. ISBN 1-58846-545-4. WW60701.
- Promethean: The Created Second Edition. Onyx Path. August 2016.
- Night Horrors: The Tormented. Onyx Path. November 2018.

== Reception ==
=== Reviews ===
- Rebel Times #8
- RPG Review #5 (Sept., 2009)
