= Exalted Storyteller's Companion =

2001 roleplaying game supplement

Exalted Storyteller's Companion is a 2001 role-playing game supplement published by White Wolf Publishing for Exalted.

== Contents ==
Exalted Storyteller's Companion is a supplement in which a four-panel gamemaster's screen comes with a book of rules for Terrestrial and Celestial characters.

== Reviews ==
- Pyramid
- Backstab
- Anduin (Issue 83 - Jun 2003)
- Realms of Fantasy
