= Werewolf: The Forsaken =

Tabletop role-playing game

- Werewolf: The Forsaken first edition cover
- Designers: Carl Bowen, Conrad Hubbard, Rick Jones, James Kiley, Matthew McFarland, Adam Tinworth (First Edition), Chris Allen, Dave Brookshaw, David Hill, Ethan Skemp, Stew Wilson, Filamena Young (Second Edition)
- Publishers: White Wolf, Onyx Path
- Publication: March 14th, 2005 (First Edition), March 4th, 2015 (Second Edition)
- Genres: Personal Horror
- Systems: Storytelling System

Werewolf: The Forsaken is a tabletop role-playing game set in the Chronicles of Darkness created by White Wolf Game Studio. It is the successor to Werewolf: The Apocalypse, the "game of savage horror" from the old World of Darkness line of games, but has moved to a more personal sort of horror, reflecting the "dark mystery" theme of the Chronicles of Darkness.

== Characters ==
Players portray the Forsaken, werewolves, known as Uratha, who hold a sworn duty to maintain a balance and prevent ingress between the spirit worlds and the material world. Any human who may unknowingly possess a werewolf heritage could undergo a First Change at some time in their life, though what triggers the metamorphosis is unknown. It is known that it almost never happens before puberty or after the age of 60. Following this Change, each character develops an Auspice, defined by what phase the moon was at during their First Change, and most join a Tribe or become a tribe-less werewolf known as a Ghost Wolf. Unlike traditional fictional werewolves, Uratha may change at any time into various forms between man and wolf, though they do find this easier when the phase of the moon matches their Auspice.

Uratha are fierce territorial predators who feel the compulsion to hunt. Many have trouble containing their aggression, hindering their ability to live normal human lives. Additionally, humans feel this aggression and are repelled by this feeling. Also, every werewolf is in danger of entering a violent Death Rage (Kuruth in the First Tongue). In this frenzied state the werewolf is a threat to everything, no matter whether friend or foe.

Uratha also possess an instinctive understanding of the First Tongue, the language spoken by their ancestors and spirits. Although initially rudimentary, many Uratha can eventually learn to speak the First Tongue fluently.

== Society ==
Uratha can, theoretically, come from any part of human society, however following the werewolf's First Change some may choose to abandon human society completely. Instead, most Uratha form packs of at least three other Uratha in order to hunt more efficiently and better protect their territory. Every pack is adopted by a totem (a spirit who bonds with the pack).

Each Forsaken werewolf who belongs to a Tribe must swear the Oath of the Moon, which acts as a moral guide for the Uratha (represented in a game system called Harmony). The tenets of the Oath are:

- The Wolf Must Hunt (the Uratha have to fulfill the roles of Father Wolf)
- The People do not murder the People (Uratha don't murder other Uratha)
- The Low honor the High, the High respect the Low
- Respect your Prey
- The Uratha shall cleave to Human (Uratha must not forget their human sides)
- Do not eat the flesh of Human or wolf
- The herd must not know (the Uratha must be hidden from the humans)

=== Auspices ===
Each Uratha has an Auspice, a traditional role in Uratha society, tied to one of five phases of the moon. Luna decides each Uratha's Auspice, based on their personality and abilities; accordingly, a Uratha will go through the First Change during the corresponding moon phase. The five Auspices have the following names in the First Tongue.

- Rahu (The Full Moon, The Warrior) – warriors of all kinds from brawlers to seasoned commanders.
- Cahalith (The Gibbous Moon, The Visionary) – seers, storytellers and lorekeepers.
- Elodoth (The Half Moon, The Walker Between) – diplomats to the spirit courts, judges and arbiters.
- Ithaeur (The Crescent Moon, The Spirit Master) – occultists and keepers of spirit lore and rituals.
- Irraka (The New Moon, The Stalker) – scouts, spies and trackers.

Each Auspice is broken down into further subdivisions called Aspects. These aspects emphasize strengths (in the form of bonuses or free purchases) of the Auspice but also introduce weaknesses to the character (in the form of flaws or penalties).

=== Tribes ===
The Forsaken have five Tribes. These Tribes consist of Uratha who choose to follow one of five ancient and powerful wolf-spirits, called the Firstborn. These Firstborn are the first born children of Father Wolf (but not of Mother Luna) and have allied with the Forsaken. Every one of the Firstborn demands that the Uratha who belong to his Tribe act in accordance to a certain ban. In second edition, each Tribe also has one sort of prey it is specialized toward hunting. These Five Tribes are:

- Blood Talons – the Tribe of Fenris Wolf, who promotes the warrior and wolf aspects of the Uratha. Their tribal ban is "Offer no surrender that you would not accept". Their favoured prey is other Werewolves.
- Bone Shadows – occultists who seek to restore relations with the Spirit Courts with the guidance of their patron, Death Wolf. Their tribal ban is "Pay each spirit in kind". Their favoured prey is Spirits.
- Hunters in Darkness – protectors of loci, the spiritual centres of the world. Black Wolf is their totem. Their tribal ban is "Let no sacred space in your territory be violated". Their favoured prey is the Hosts.
- Iron Masters – this Tribe, following the teachings of Red Wolf, embrace change and new ideas. They are closer to humanity, keeping up with technology and taking cities for their territory. Their tribal ban is "Honor your territory in all things". Their favoured prey is humans, along with the creatures that hide among them.
- Storm Lords – the Tribe of Winter Wolf seeks to lead all Uratha through strength and noble example. Their tribal ban is "Allow no one to witness or to tend your weakness". Their favoured prey is the Spirit-Ridden and Spirit-Claimed, material objects and creatures that have become possessed by spirits.

Next to these five Tribes, there are the Ghost Wolves among the Forsaken who either never joined a tribe or left them behind. Therefore, they neither have a tribal ban nor a tribal patron. Some follow the Oath of the Moon and others do not; the only thing that all Ghost Wolves have in common is that they don't belong to the Uratha society in the traditional sense.

== Biology ==
The Uratha are physical and spiritual creatures, who can use the energy of the spirits (called Essence) to activate certain supernatural powers (called gifts), supernatural tools (called fetishes), change form or accelerate their healing.

Unlike humans, Uratha heal very fast (sometimes in a matter of seconds) and can theoretically regrow limbs and organs (which is accompanied with a great deal of effort). An exception to this rule are wounds caused by silver. These wounds have a resemblance to burns and only heal very slowly and with difficulty. The Uratha are immune against normal diseases and most foreign particles are expelled from their bodies very quickly.

The metabolism of a Uratha is faster than that of a human and so they have to eat more. What they can eat depends on their personal taste and the form they assume at the moment. Most prefer meat, but a vegetarian diet is also possible (but very difficult).

Uratha can reproduce with humans, but the chance that the child will be a Uratha is very small. Reproduction with wolves is not possible and, in first edition, a mating between two Uratha could result in the birth of a Spirit monster called Unihar (mating with other Uratha was considered as a serious sin). In second edition, the taboo of Uratha mating and the Unihar were removed.

=== Forms ===
Every Uratha may metamorphose at will into five distinct forms, each with its own benefits and drawbacks (physical abilities, digestive traits, reaction to certain drugs, instincts). The three hybrid forms between human and wolf (just like the usage of clearly supernatural powers) create a certain defense mechanism in normal humans called the Lunacy. Due to the effects of Lunacy, humans will forget or bury their memories in their minds and mechanical means of observation (e.g. cameras) will malfunction. Only humans who are supernatural themselves or have an extremely strong will are immune to this effect. The forms, named in the First Tongue, are:

- Hishu – human form. A Uratha appears to be a normal, if very fit and healthy, human. An unconscious or dead werewolf returns to this form. This is the form most Uratha are most comfortable with.
- Dalu – near-human form. The Uratha is significantly bigger, hairier and stronger. Ears, teeth and nails are slightly pointed and the face is more angular. Facial hair is noticeable even on females. This form reacts in a similar manner as that of the human form.
- Gauru – wolf-man or war form. Half-human, half-wolf, the Gauru form of Uratha are generally 8 to 9 feet (2.7 m) tall and much heavier and stronger than any human. In this form a werewolf's bloodthirst rises to the surface and is much harder to control. Uratha can only channel the power of the Gauru form for a limited time, and generally only take this form to kill. This forms' reaction towards chemicals is nearly impossible to predict and a Uratha takes this form automatically when he enters Death Rage.
- Urshul – near-wolf form. A Uratha in this form is a huge wolf 3 to 5 feet (1.5 m) high at the shoulder, resembling the extinct dire wolf. This form reacts in a similar manner as the wolf form.
- Urhan – wolf form. The Uratha is indistinguishable from a normal grey wolf. Depending on the area where the Uratha comes from, respectively which area shaped the majority of his ancestors, this form differs. If there are grey wolves in the area, this form looks similar to these wolves respectively similar to other canines like the African wild dog, dhole, or red wolf (but never like domestic dogs). Some Uratha of Africa and the Near East even developed forms similar in coloration and to a certain extent build of hyenas.

== Supernatural abilities ==
Besides the physical abilities, which all Uratha possess, they can also have access to a wide range of individual powers called Gifts. These Gifts aren't inherited and cannot be learned from other Uratha, but are bestowed by spirits as part of a deal. Some Gifts are easier to learn than others, depending on Tribe, Lodge, or Auspice. Others are only open to specific Uratha. The effects of these Gifts are variable, some enhance physical abilities, while others change the form, bestow powers of divination, control the elements etc. The more powerful the Gift, the higher the rank of the Uratha in question among the spirits must be to learn the Gift.

Furthermore, the Uratha can, with the help of certain rituals, bind spirits into objects and even tattoos and bestow these objects with supernatural power. These objects are called fetishes and can be used once or multiple times. The power of the fetish depends on the power of the bound spirit.

== Backstory ==
According to the legend of the Forsaken, the world was once a perfect place called Pangaea—although it is not apparent whether the term refers to a certain place or time. In this world, the barrier between the spirit world and the material world was thin and it was easy to travel from one world into the other.

The spirit who watched over the balance between both was Father Wolf, the mightiest warrior of his time. Father Wolf patrolled the barrier between the two worlds and allowed spirits to remain in the spirit world and even form cults around them. But only so long as they did not become as humans are and flesh and spirit remained separated. Many of the powerful spirit lords saw the wisdom in that and followed the rules. However, those who threatened the balance between the worlds were either chased back to their world or were killed outright.

Over time Luna, the spirit of the moon, began to travel the world in a body of flesh. She had many suitors but only chose Father Wolf as a mate, due to his strength and power. With him she sired the First Pack (children part human, part wolf, and part spirit), who were the ancestors of all Uratha and assisted their father in his duties.

Over time Father Wolf grew weak and was no longer able to fulfill his duties. When his children saw his weakness, they began to rebel against their father and succeeded in killing him and taking his place. As Father Wolf died, the barrier between the worlds became so strong that traveling from one to another was only possible in special places for most beings. The pain over the death of her lover caused Mother Luna to curse all children she had ever borne, so that silver (her sacred metal) is able to kill them.

Those Uratha who killed Father Wolf, later swore the Oath of the Moon and promised to fulfill the duties of their father. To those Uratha, Luna gave her Auspices and lifted the curse partly. The Forsaken sought out the Firstborn and later founded the five Tribes of the Forsaken.

Besides this main legend, there are other legends in the published material (e.g. Father Wolf had not become weak in general but had been weakened due to the fight with an enemy. Therefore, it would not have been necessary to kill Father Wolf).

The above story is only the most widespread version, as several modifications only have the basics in common. As the spirits who could attest to the stories mostly don't communicate with the Uratha, at least not directly, the "truth" is unclear and many myths concerning the origin of the Uratha exist. The published book Blasphemies deals with several possible origins of the Uratha as well as the Uratha who believe in them and provides rules to create myths of origin.

== Antagonists ==
In the Chronicles of Darkness, there are many dangers for the Uratha. But these rivalries rarely result in open combat, since most supernatural beings in the setting prefer to be hidden. The main threats to the Forsaken are:

- Spirits: Spirits who do not acknowledge the barrier between the worlds are the most common adversary of the Forsaken. Spirits gain sustenance by feeding on the concepts they represent. Some spirits possess humans in order to create more sustenance for themselves by manipulating their victims, others travel to the material world for the alien experiences offered by possessing a human. For example, a pain spirit might possess a child in order to inflict pain on other children in order to feed itself. Some claim the bodies of living beings outright and become some of the most dangerous foes. These claimed are unique amalgamations of being and spirit and can bestow the claimed body with a variety of powers. Some can even warp the bodies to unknown levels and become shapeshifters themselves (e.g. some leopard-spirits possess human beings and can take on the shape of a leopard as well) or develop supernatural abilities of extraordinary power. The Forsaken's primary duty is to hunt down these wayward spirits and return them to the spirit world by any means necessary, defending humanity from their depredations. Most spirits hate the Forsaken for denying them the pleasures of the material world, which makes travel to the spirit world dangerous for them. The Forsaken cannot just destroy every wayward spirit because this would leave the physical world as a hollow shell or make room for even more dangerous foes.
- The Pure (Anshega): Werewolves descended from those who chose not to rise up and slay Father Wolf. They blame their Forsaken cousins for the loss of Pangaea and view the extermination of the Forsaken as a holy crusade. They are superior in number to the Forsaken, and their culture of hate and battle prowess has made them the Forsakens' most implacable enemies. The Pure have only contempt for humanity and feel no duty to defend them from spirits, which makes spirits far friendlier to them than to the Forsaken. Their only disadvantage is that Luna has not granted them her favor, which means they have no Auspices and are more susceptible to silver than the Forsaken. The Pure venerate Father Wolf but do not take on his duties. They mostly live by a "the end justifies the means"-philosophy which lets their Harmony, which is actually more precious to them, erode over time. Physically they do not differ from the Forsaken, except for the lack of Auspices. The Pure are not a uniform group, but consist of three Tribes who all follow a Firstborn of Father Wolf, who never forgave the death of their father. These Tribes are: the Fire-Touched (Izidakh) who follow Rabid Wolf with religious zeal and are the most numerous of all Tribes; the Ivory Claws (Tzuumfin) who follow Silver Wolf, are obsessed with "purity" and see themselves as the most pure werewolves and the rightful leader of the Pure; and the Predator Kings (Ninna Farakh) who follow Dire Wolf and see themselves as the top of the food chain, the ultimate predators and leave their human side behind them as far as possible.
- The Hosts: Bizarre creatures who, like the Forsaken, are a hybrid of spirit and flesh, man and animal. They are descended from powerful Pangaean spirits hunted by Father Wolf for their attacks on humanity. They escaped total destruction by splitting themselves into thousands of spirit shards, each of which inhabited an animal. These shards became the Hosts. These hosts are the Azlu (spider-monsters) and the Beshilu (rat-things). These beings strengthen or weaken the barrier between the worlds (which can have very negative side effects in both cases), as well as seek and consume more of their own kind to become stronger. When they reach a certain level of power, they may seek out a suitable human, merge with him, and evolve into a unique combination of human and animal (spider or rat). Humans are mostly tools or food for these Hosts. Apart from these main Hosts, there are other Hosts in the form of locusts, ravens, and snakes. There are possibly even more kinds of Hosts who don't have much in common with either Azlu or Beshilu.
- The Idigam: The rarest of the Forsaken's enemies, these cthonic entities are the spirits that represent concepts that existed before the world was fully formed. The term "Idigam" means "moon banished," used to denote that these powerful spirits were exiled beyond the spirit world, possibly by Father Wolf himself. As such, they have no place in reality and exhibit powers and motives beyond comprehension. Idigam are vast and unknowable, which makes them almost impossible to confront physically. When the Idigam appeared the last time, in the 1960s, they were such a threat that they led to the few times in history that the Forsaken and the Pure had to cooperate to defeat them – and even then they did not manage to defeat all of them. Originally believed to be linked to the Abyss from Mage: the Awakening, it was revealed in Night Horrors: Wolfsbane that they are terrestrial spirits who were sealed on the physical moon, and that they stowed away on the Apollo missions to return to Earth.
- The Bale-Hounds (Azah Gadar): these Uratha devoted themselves to the Maeljin, archetypal spirits of the Seven Deadly Sins plus Violence and Deception. From their view, the world is fundamentally flawed and they want to be on the winning side. Therefore, they committed themselves to the worst kind of spirits in the world and commit acts which are unspeakable and warp the place they inhabit into places of evil over time. Supposedly, the spirit who serves as an ambassador and is called Soulless Wolf is a Firstborn of Father Wolf and the Azah Gadar are the Ninth Tribe. The Azah Gadar are some of the few enemies which can bring the Forsaken and the Pure to cooperate to destroy a common foe.
- Humans: Humans can be friend or foe for the Uratha, especially those who are part supernatural themselves, since the Lunacy provokes a weaker reaction or sometimes even fails to affect them. The main threat that humans embody is the fact that they influence the spirit world more strongly than any other species, even when they are practically severed from the spirit world. Some facts about the Uratha have found their way into human culture, and the fact that such a thing was possible is very unnerving, especially since, with the help of modern weapons, even a single human can be very dangerous.
- Other Supernaturals: The Forsaken occasionally come into conflict with other supernatural denizens of the world, like ghosts, vampires, mages, skinthieves, or the other were-beasts. Reasons for a conflict can be very different, but there is no dead set animosity towards other supernaturals. The Uratha can cooperate with other supernaturals if it is worth the effort, but prefer the presence of their own kind. Furthermore, there are other uncommon and sometimes unique beings whose motives, and therefore reasons, for conflict with the Forsaken can differ enormously from each other.

== Comparisons with the previous game ==
Werewolf: The Forsaken, while thematically similar to the prior game, Werewolf: The Apocalypse, is different in both mechanics and setting details, although there are strong similarities between the two games and their settings beyond the thematic ones.

Werewolves in both games struggle to interact with humanity while maintaining their spiritual and animalistic sides for example, defending their territory. Conflict with other Werewolves of different ideologies was present in Apocalypse. The Pure in Forsaken are far more prevalent, numerous and morally ambiguous than the diabolical Black Spiral Dancers of the prior game, and more roughly parallel the cultural divide between the Native American Tribes (Wendigo, Uktena and the extinct Croatan) and the "European" Tribes (all the others). The primary difference in the conflict is that Werewolves in Forsaken are not set to defend the planetary ecosystem and its spirit (Gaia) from the depredations of human civilization and technology. Furthermore, the decision to behave in a moral fashion is enforced by rules that are foremost and dire: a werewolf could become consumed with depravity and immorality should they become murderers. In Apocalypse, any werewolf who could claim just cause could kill someone—and many were those who might be slain freely outside conscience.

Other design changes have been made with regard to the spirit world; werewolves now have a much more hostile relationship with spirits than they did in the prior game.

Uratha cannot be born from wolves, and the killing form of Gauru can only be held for a very short time.

== Books ==
- Werewolf: The Forsaken (March 2005)
- Hunting Ground: The Rockies (April 2005)
- Predators (June 2005)
- Lore of the Forsaken (August 2005)
- Blood of the Wolf (October 2005)
- Lodges: The Faithful (November 2005)
- Blasphemies (January 2006)
- Territories (April 2006)
- Lodges: The Splintered (September 2006)
- The Pure (November 2006)
- Parlor Games (PDF Only)* (January, 2007)
- The Rage: Forsaken Player's Guide (February 2007)
- The War Against the Pure (March 2007)
- Tribes of the Moon (April 2008)
- Ready-Made Player Characters: Calm Before the Storm (July 2009)
- Night Horrors: Wolfsbane (September 2009)
- Signs of the Moon (August 2010)
- Forsaken Chronicler's Guide (PDF, Print On Demand format) (June 2011)
- Werewolf: The Forsaken 2nd Edition/The Idigam Chronicle (PDF, Print on Demand format) (March 2015)
- The Pack (PDF, Print on Demand format) (June 2016)
- Night Horrors: Shunned by the Moon (July 2019)

* Storytelling Adventure System

== Reviews ==
- Dragon Slayer
- Pyramid
- Rebel Times #9
- Rue Morgue #46
- Realms of Fantasy
