= John Snead =

Role-playing game designer

John Snead is a freelance role-playing writer who lives in Portland, Oregon. Snead has worked for Chaosium, White Wolf, Last Unicorn, and Green Ronin, and Onyx Path.

== Early life and education ==
His education includes a B.A. in Mathematics and History and minors in Classics and Physics from Washington University in St. Louis as well as a M.A. in Cultural Anthropology from the University of Wisconsin–Madison. He has been gaming since 1980 and became a full-time designer and writer of role-playing games in 1998.

== Career ==
John Snead did some of the early work on Chaosium's Nephilim game line. He has also done work for White Wolf and Last Unicorn Games. Snead approached Green Ronin Publishing with his idea for a romantic fantasy role-playing game, Steve Kenson worked with him to produce it as Blue Rose (2005), the second OGL-based game published by Green Ronin. He came up with the initial idea and setting for and wrote a significant portion of Blue Rose, and has written large amounts of Exalted, Trinity and Mage: The Awakening, as well as work on many other games. Snead is the developer for Onyx Path Publishing's science fiction game Trinity Continuum: Æon. Æon is a revised version of the Trinity role-playing game.
