= Stephen Lea Sheppard =

Canadian writer and actor

Stephen Lea Sheppard is a Canadian writer and former television and film actor. He played Dudley Heinsbergen in the 2001 Wes Anderson film The Royal Tenenbaums and geek guru Harris Trinsky on NBC dramedy Freaks and Geeks.

Sheppard was born in 1983 in Gibsons, British Columbia, northwest of Vancouver.

Anderson's friend, Judd Apatow, recommended Sheppard, who was acting in Apatow's TV series Freaks and Geeks, to Anderson. On a commentary track for the Freaks and Geeks episode, "Looks and Books”, Apatow shared that he gave Anderson an "acting reel" he made of Sheppard's performance on the show, in order to help Sheppard get his Royal Tenenbaums role. These two roles remain Sheppard's only on-camera acting credits.

Beginning in 2007, he has co-authored several modules for the role playing game Exalted.

Sheppard lives in Surrey, British Columbia.
