= Blood and Salt =

Blood and Salt is a 2004 role-playing game supplement published by White Wolf Publishing for Exalted.

== Contents ==
Blood and Salt is a supplement in which a comprehensive guide to the pirate‑cursed Lintha Family and the decadent principalities of An‑Teng, details their histories, cultures, dark practices, and the gods and monsters of the Southwestern Ocean to support campaigns set in the Southwest.

== Reviews ==
- Backstab #48
- Realms of Fantasy
