= Trinity: Battleground =

Board game

Trinity: Battleground is a 1997 board game published by White Wolf Publishing.

== Gameplay ==
Trinity: Battleground is a game in which a boxed miniatures wargame depicts the clash between Aberrants and Seventh Legion psions on the distant colony world of Khantze Lu Ge.

== Reviews ==
- InQuest Gamer #43
- Backstab #11
- The Comics Buyer's Guide
