= Mummy: The Resurrection =

2001 tabletop role-playing game

- Mummy: The Resurrection cover art
- Designers: Justin Achilli, Tim Avers, Andrew Bates, Kraig Blackwelder, Philippe R. Boulle, Carl Bowen, Ken Cliffe, Jess Heinig, Conrad Hubbard, Richard Thomas, Stephan Wieck, Stewart Wieck, Jim (Looking Eagle) Estes, Graeme Davis
- Publishers: White Wolf
- Publication: March 19, 2001
- Systems: Storyteller System
- Parent games: Vampire: The Masquerade
- Series: World of Darkness

Mummy: The Resurrection is a role-playing game released by White Wolf Game Studios on March 19, 2001, where the players assume the role of resurrected mummies living in the modern world. Mummy: The Resurrection introduces the Amenti, a new style of mummy instead of those presented in earlier World of Darkness products.

== Setting ==
In 1999, a catastrophic storm (the Sixth Maelstrom, a major event in White Wolf's metaplot) shook the Underworld and – among other things – woke Osiris from his long slumber. Osiris took a glimpse at the Earth and realised that the world was a very dark place, very much in need of his help. Osiris decided to issue an announcement to his worshipers on Earth, in which he assured them that they were not forsaken, and then he granted them a new spell – the Spell of Life – to resurrect the chosen ones who would do battle in his name. Taking the formal name of Amenti, in honor of the lost city of the dead, they were created, armed with Hekau magic to do battle against the servants of Apophis, the game's main antagonist.

Mummy (Vampire: The Masquerade) 1st edition cover

Mummy (World of Darkness) 2nd edition cover

=== Creation ===
Mummies are agents of balance. They are created with the perfected Spell of Life given out by Osiris. The tem-akh is a shard of an old and powerful Egyptian spirit. It is the strongest portion of a soul that has been destroyed in the Sixth Maelstrom. This tem-akh looks for an imbalance of a mortal's soul who has recently died. This soul or nehem-sen is weak where the tem-akh is strong. The tem-akh offers a chance of resurrection and a second chance at life. If the nehem-sen refuses, the tem-akh moves on to find another and leaves the nehem-sen to the dangers of the underworld alone. If the nehem-sen agrees, the tem-akh tears away the portion of the soul that is most flawed. This causes intense agony. After tearing this away, the tem-akh inserts itself into the missing part of the soul and perfects the flawed soul. The soul is now strongest where it was once the weakest. The tem-akh forces itself across the shroud and back into the dead body. The body is then reanimated and appears as a walking corpse. With the nehem-sen in shock, the tem-akh is in control and has the responsibility of getting the body back to the Web of Faith which is in Egypt and the surrounding area. At this point the body and hybrid soul has not attained true rebirth. It has 70 days to return to the Lands of Faith. As the potential Amenti gets close to the Lands of Faith, resurrected factions use Hekau or receive visions from Osiris to discover when and where the Amenti will appear. Once one of the resurrected factions secure one of these new arrivals, it is taken to one of the sacred sites within the Lands of Faith. At this time the Spell of Life is performed. During this time the soul faces the Judges of Ma’at. If the soul fails the test, the spell of life fails and the body and soul die. If the soul passes the two souls are permanently fused together and are returned to the body. Once the spell of life is complete the Amenti is truly immortal and ready to serve as an agent of Ma’at in the service of Osiris. The Tem-akh is from the Amenti’s First Life. The nehem-sen is from the Amenti’s Second Life. After the spell of life is complete the Amenti is now in his Third Life. In the Third Life, the Amenti is literally a new person. It is a melding of the first and second lives. It has memories and personality traits from both of the previous lives. The type of mummy that the reborn returns as is dependent upon the tem-akh that joins with the nehem-sen. There are five types of tem-akh. They are as follows:

- Ka – This is the part of the soul that protects the Khat (body).
- Ba – This grants strength of character and free thinking. Allows individuality.
- Sahu – This is the part of the soul that drives the morality of the person.
- Khu – This part of the soul drives creativity and inspiration.
- Khaibit – This generates the drive, ambition and aggression.

=== The Resurrected ===
- Tomb Watchers: or Kher-minu, are created from the Ka tem-akh. The ka chooses its mortal host from those who bear little protective instinct or love for their own lives and bodies. The host is usually a casualty of a tragic or self-destructive lifestyle. During the Third Life, the Amenti will begin to learn safety precautions and survival techniques. Eventually leading to protecting a person, place or possession.
  - Primary Hekau: Amulets
  - Quote: "Our bodies are temples. All life is a sacred gift."
- Scroll-bearers: or Khri-habi, are created from the Ba tem-akh. The ba chooses its mortal host from those who are ruled by instinct, habit or dogma. People who do not think for themselves or have a weak sense of individuality. The host was dominated by the influences of peers, authority figures, tradition, habit and/or routine. During the Third Life, the Amenti will get rid of thoughtless or counterproductive behaviors that arise from habit, peer pressure or blind obedience to authority. They will most likely develop a life that helps other people by beginning a career as a therapist, psychologist, or doctor.
  - Primary Hekau: Alchemy
  - Quote: "We must heal the living world so that its wounds will cease to ravage the lands of the dead. All beings have a part to play, and we will help them learn it."
- Night Suns: or Mesektet, are created from the Sahu tem-akh. The sahu chooses its mortal host from those whose lives revolved around deception, superficiality and shortsighted folly. Someone who was ruled by a desire to lie or cheat. During the Third Life, the Amenti will begin to atone for the wrongs they have committed. They will use the skills they used to put toward evil, toward redemption instead.
  - Primary Hekau: Celestial
  - Quote: "Shadow and secrets fall away before your gaze once you have seen heaven's brilliance."
- Spirit Scepters: or Sakhmu, are created from the Khu tem-akh. The khu chooses its mortal host from those who were dull and selfish or plodding and self-centered in life. A mortal who led an empty life. Someone who was lost in the self-absorbed bustle of the daily grind that they never saw the beauty of the world around them. During the Third Life, the Amenti will revel in their newfound inspiration. Their imagination and creativity flares to life. It is comparable to a blind man who can suddenly see.
  - Primary Hekau: Effigy
  - Quote: "By opening the eyes of the living to the sacred, we can heal the world."
- Unbandaged Ones: or Sefekhi, are created from the Khaibit tem-akh. The khaibit is the driving and aggressive essence of the soul. It is the shadow of the soul. The shadow soul partners with a nehem-sen that was frail, weak, timid, restrained or unassertive. It may be due to a lack of drive, strong will, pacifism or rigid self-discipline. The Third Life starts out shaky and bloody. The Sefekhi are killing machines who endeavor to redirect their seething excess energy into more constructive areas. They take on the most violent and dangerous tasks that Osiris and Ma'at require.
  - Primary Hekau: Necromancy
  - Quote: "I have long suffered in the underworld for my sins. Now you will suffer for yours."
- Judged Ones: or Udja-sen, are created when a tem-akh/nehem-sen is corrupted and fails the test from the Judges of Ma'at. When this happens they are given another chance and the tem-akh is then warped from its natural state by the Judges to cover the mummy's spiritual wounds. Any function the tem-akh would have served as well as most of its memories are erased. While the spell of life will complete and the bond of body & soul is capable of resurrection, there is a mystical wound that serves as an eternal reminder of its judgment. They are referred by other Amenti and resurrection factions as the Judged Ones. The Third Life begins for these Amenti with confusion and pain. They do not have a strong and guiding presence from their tem-akh. They also have enormous gaps in their memories from their second life. With this curse comes a blessing. They are free to become whatever and pursue Ma'at however they want. They are also not tied to the Web of Faith as other Amenti are. They receive more Sekhem than other Amenti and can transfer that to others as well.
  - Primary Hekau: Any
  - Quote: "What did I do to deserve this?"

=== Hekau ===
The six paths of Hekau are divided into distinct magical sciences. While an old and powerful mummy will learn every art, the young Amenti struggle with just a fraction of the magical art. Each Amenti finds that a certain path comes naturally to them based on their tem-akh. These six include:

- Alchemy
  - The Hekau path of Alchemy allows the creation of potions, poisons and cures for nearly every occasion. They also can increase abilities to superhuman levels.
- Amulets
  - The Hekau path of Amulets, also known as meket, is the art of crafting charms that focus on protection against evil, sickness or sorcery. They can also be made to boost abilities to superhuman levels.
- Celestial
  - The Hekau path of Celestial allows Amenti to tap into heavenly forces to see what is to come and to command nature. They can cast spells to alter fate and fortune, influence the weather and call upon the gods themselves.
- Effigy
  - The Hekau path of Effigy allows the ability to create artifacts and relics as well as figurines that come alive and serve the Amenti. The path includes concepts of architectural magic and spiritual symbolism.
- Necromancy
  - The Hekau path of Necromancy is used in the influence of the underworld and the dead. It channels the khaibit to perform incantations which can summon or banish ghosts, protect the Amenti's soul as it wanders the afterlife or even energize the mummy with the entropy of death itself.
- Nomenclature
  - The Hekau path of Nomenclature or ren, is the mastery of the language of the divine. It is the magic of true names and allows metamorphosis, commanding, healing, creation and even erasing subjects from existence.

=== Resurrection Factions ===
- The Cult of Isis are worshippers of Isis that have continued through the years. After receiving the new Spell of Life they view Amenti as one chosen by the gods. They see them as representative of the divine and expect favors for their role in the resurrected.
- Children of Osiris were once vampires who were cured by Osiris. Now they use their centuries of knowledge to assist the newly reborn Amenti. As former vampires, they are not trusted by the other factions.
- Shemsu-Heru are followers of Horus the Avenger and assist the Imkhu, or Revered Ones, those mummies who have been alive for thousands of years from the original spell of life and recently have been reborn with the perfected spell.
- Eset-A, and the Amenti that join them, are dedicated in finding all of Osiris' body parts and to restore Osiris to the land of the living.
- The Ashukhi Corporation is used to build a better world. It invests in innovative new technologies for the future and archeological studies for the past. They hope to build a better world by striving to create a source of wealth and technological power for Osiris to inherit upon his return.

=== Life as the Undying ===
- With the new perfected Spell of Life, the Amenti are truly alive. Upon returning to life, the Amenti is more alive than ever before. His senses are more refined, and sensation is more intense. Lights are more colorful and brighter. Sex is more fulfilling. Food is more flavorful. Life becomes indescribably more sensuous. They eat, sleep and breathe. Their life force is extremely strong. In the novel Lay Down With Lions, the zombie Carpenter compared the life force of humans to candles, the Imbued to halogen lights and the Amenti to a lighthouse.
- The Amenti are able to have sex and produce children. These children are mortal but are prone to having certain merits or have the potential for sorcery.
- Amenti retain their general physical appearance as of the end of their Second Life. They do not age or suffer from any of the effects of aging after rebirth, regardless of the maturity of their khat. Even mortals who become mummies at a relatively advanced age have the vigor and vitality of young adults. The only exception is if a tem-akh chooses a child to be one of the reborn. These children continue to grow in their Third Life until they reach physical maturity and then stop aging.
- Amenti have unique sensory abilities. They can sense all mystical energies and events. They also have two additional senses.
  - Insight: Strongly attuned to the energies of life they are able to pick up strong emotional impressions between two people or from a single individual. They are also able to pick up particular emotions if the mummy desires.
  - Deathsight: When they are in spirit form, the Amenti can sense signs of illness, frailty or impending death in a living subject. They can also detect hidden flaws or minute weaknesses.
- Amenti heal faster than mortals.
- The blood of the Amenti is a powerful weapon. Where before it did not grant any sustenance to vampires, now with the perfected Spell of Life, the blood of the Amenti is twice as potent to vampires as that of mortals. It will also grant the vampire temporary Humanity. This weakens them as they become disgusted with who and what they are. They become addicted and crave the potent vitae but then hate the moral weakness that it brings about in them. Amenti can be blood bound to a vampire but if they are instructed to do anything that would violate Ma’at then they have a chance to break the bond. If they do so, then they cannot be bound by that particular vampire again.

== System ==
In its first inception (circa 1992), Mummy was released as a softcover rules supplement for Vampire: The Masquerade which printed rules allowing play as an immortal mummy originating from ancient Egypt. The rules also provided the option to play as a mummy character originating from ancient China or the ancient Andes. The rules stated that the resurrected mummy character was revived by combining their original soul with their mummified body using a magical spell granted either by the god Osiris (Egyptian mummies), ancient Inca spirits (South American mummies), or the Eight Immortals (Chinese mummies). The mummy character was deemed to be centuries-old, and had managed to live undetected among humans throughout history.

The Second Edition of the supplement (1997) was similar to the first, but updated the rules regarding mummies, their role within the World of Darkness and aligned them with the background and metaplot of Vampire: TM's second edition.

Mummy: The Resurrection received one supplement: Mummy Players Guide in 2002

== Reviews ==
- Pyramid
- Envoyer #76 (February 2003) p. 17-19 - German translation
- Backstab #29
- Rue Morgue #21
- Realms of Fantasy

== Related media ==
In the beginning of the partnership between World of Darkness owner Paradox Interactive and interactive fiction video game developer Choice of Games, the latter pitched several ideas for World of Darkness adaptations, including a hardboiled Mummy: The Resurrection video game where the player investigates serial killers by assuming the form of their favored type of victims; in the end, the partnership instead resulted in three Vampire: The Masquerade games, although Jason Stevan Hill, the editor of the project, has expressed an interest in developing further World of Darkness video games after the three Vampire: The Masquerade ones.
