= Genevieve Cogman =

British novelist and game designer

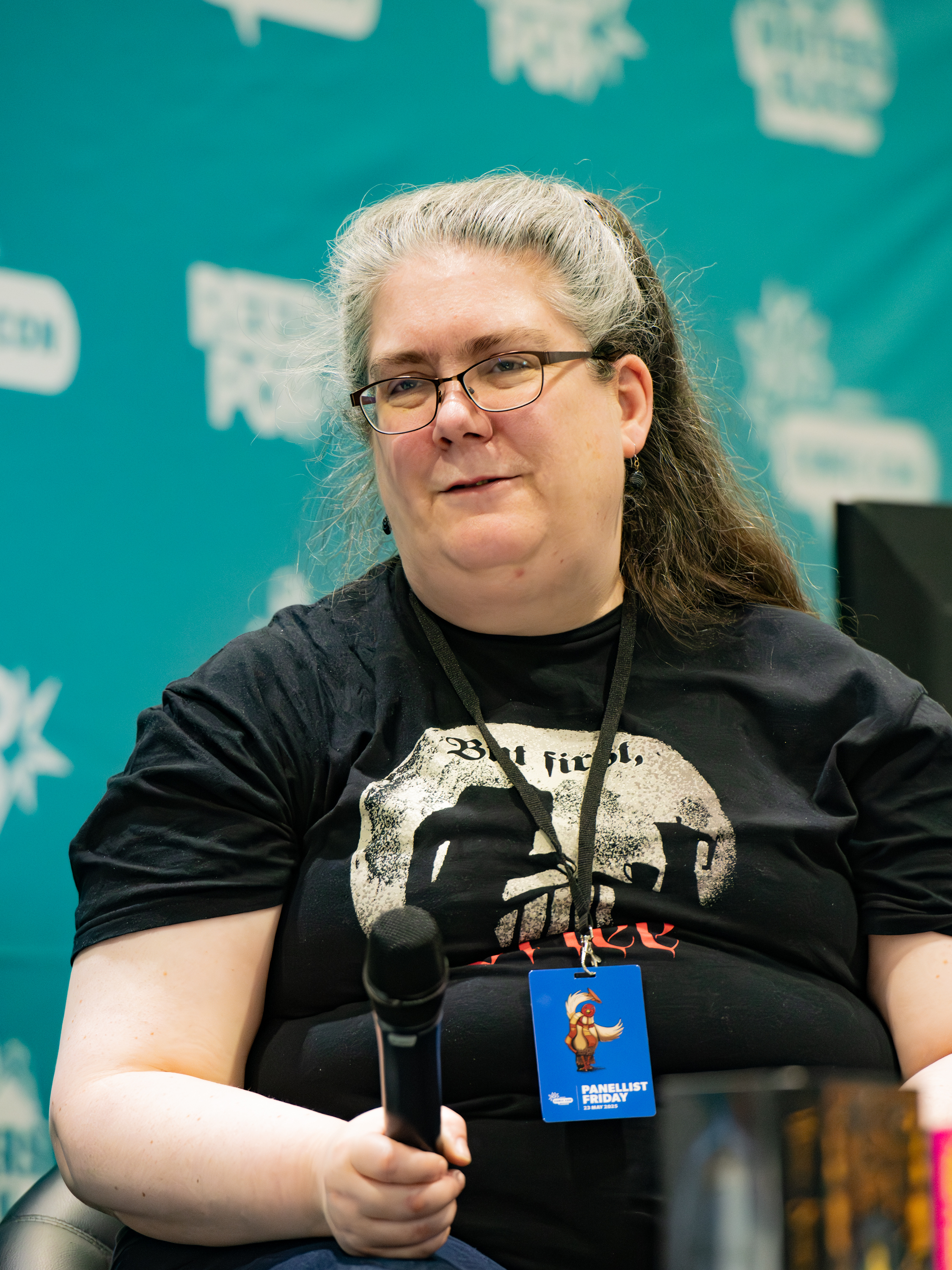
- At MCM London Comic Con, May 2025
- Occupation: Author
- Writing career
- Genre: Fantasy
- Notable work: The Invisible Library series
- Website: grcogman.com

Genevieve Cogman is a British author of fantasy literature and role-playing games.

== Life ==
Cogman has an MSc in statistics with Medical Applications. She works for the NHS as a clinical classifications specialist and lives in the north of England.

Cogman has also worked as a freelance role-playing author, contributing towards the Steve Jackson Games titles In Nomine and GURPS, the White Wolf Publishing titles Orpheus and Exalted, and the Evil Hat Productions title The Dresden Files.

== Writing ==
Cogman's debut novel The Invisible Library was released in January 2015. The book was the first in an eponymous series, continued by The Masked City (December 2015), The Burning Page (December 2016), The Lost Plot (2017), The Mortal Word (2018), The Secret Chapter (2019), The Dark Archive (2020) and its final title, The Untold Story (2021). The series revolves around a team of secretive undercover librarians who travel to alternate realities to acquire works of fiction on behalf of a sprawling interdimensional library that exists outside of normal space and time. The main character is Irene, a Junior Librarian with a great British humour, and the adventures she has with her assistant and friend, the mysterious and charming Kai. The series incorporates numerous fantasy elements including steampunk, supernatural beings, and magic.

== Bibliography ==
=== The Invisible Library novels ===
- Book 1: The Invisible Library London: Pan Macmillan, 2015. ISBN 978-1-4472-5623-6
- Book 2: The Masked City London: Pan Macmillan, 2015. ISBN 978-1-4472-5625-0
- Book 3: The Burning Page London: Pan Macmillan, 2016. ISBN 978-1-4472-5627-4
- Book 4: The Lost Plot London: Pan Macmillan, 2017. ISBN 978-1-5098-3071-8
- Book 5: The Mortal Word London: Pan Macmillan, 2018. ISBN 978-1-5098-3072-5
- Book 6: The Secret Chapter London: Pan Macmillan, 2019. ISBN 978-1-5290-0057-3
- Book 7: The Dark Archive London: Pan Macmillan, 2020. ISBN 978-1-5290-0060-3
- Book 8: The Untold Story London: Pan Macmillan, 2021. ISBN 978-1-5290-0063-4

=== The Scarlet Revolution novels ===
- Book 1: Scarlet London: Pan Macmillan, 2023. ISBN 978-1-5290-8372-9
- Book 2: Elusive London: Tor, 2024. ISBN 978-1-5290-8377-4
- Book 3: Damned London: Tor UK, 2025. ISBN 978-1-5290-8382-8

=== Other books ===
- Lois McMaster Bujold's Vorkosigan Saga: Sourcebook and Roleplaying Game, 2009.

=== Short fiction ===
- Snow and Salt, 2004.
- The Final Path, 2016.
