= Dawn Elliott =

American biomedical engineer

Dawn M. Elliott is an American biomedical engineer whose research concerns the biomechanics of connective tissue including the tendons, menisci, and intervertebral discs. She is a Blue and Gold Distinguished Professor of Biomedical Engineering at the University of Delaware, adjunct professor of orthopaedic surgery at the Perelman School of Medicine at the University of Pennsylvania, and the former president of the Biomedical Engineering Society.

== Education and career ==
Elliott majored in mechanical engineering as an undergraduate at the University of Michigan, graduating in 1988. She earned a master's degree in engineering mechanics at the University of Cincinnati in 1995, and completed a PhD in biomedical engineering at Duke University in 1999.

She was a professor of orthopaedic surgery and bioengineering at the University of Pennsylvania for 12 years, before joining the University of Delaware in 2011 as founding chair of the Department of Biomedical Engineering.

She was elected as president of the Biomedical Engineering Society in 2017, for the 2018–2020 term.

== Recognition ==
Elliott was named as an ASME Fellow in 2012, and as a Fellow of the American Institute for Medical and Biological Engineering in 2013, "for outstanding contributions to the field of biomechanics, elucidating the mechanical factors that contribute to intervertebral disc degeneration".

In 2015 the American Society of Mechanical Engineers gave Elliott the Van C. Mow Medal. In 2019 she was named as the inaugural winner of the Adele L. Boskey, PhD Award of the Orthopaedic Research Society.
