= Mage: The Awakening =

2005 tabletop role-playing game

- First edition cover
- Designers: Bill Bridges, Conrad Hubbard
- Publishers: White Wolf Publishing; Onyx Path Publishing
- Publication: August 29, 2005 (first edition); May 4, 2016 (second edition)
- Genres: Personal horror
- Systems: Storytelling System
- Series: Chronicles of Darkness
- ISBN: 1-58846-418-0 (first edition)

Mage: The Awakening is a tabletop role-playing game originally published by White Wolf Publishing on August 29, 2005, and is the third game in their Chronicles of Darkness series. The characters portrayed in this game are individuals able to bend or break the commonly accepted rules of reality to perform subtle or outlandish acts of magic. These characters are broadly referred to as "mages".

== Background and setting ==
At some point in the past (or, a version of the past that was erased) there was a great mage city called Atlantis. Other names for Atlantis include Aztlan, the Naga Kingdom, Shambhala, Hyperborea, Brittia, and Paititi. It was the inspiration for similar stories about an glorious lost city or kingdom all around the world. Exactly what Atlantis was like is hard for mages to determine. Time magic seems to indicate it is not present anywhere in time, and the remaining ruins and artifacts don't suggest a single coherent history or culture.

What is known is that at some point, many or all mages from Atlantis ascended to the Supernal Realm of pure truth from which magic comes all at once, which created a rift between the Supernal World of pure truth and the ordinary material world. This rift is called the Abyss, and its existence blinds most of humanity to magic and the existence of the Supernal Realm, an effect which is known as "the Lie". This event, called the Fall, also erased Atlantis from ordinary history, though ruins and artifacts still remain.

Some or all of the ascended mages from Atlantis became Exarchs, ascended mages whose domain is various forms of oppression and tyranny. They want to control the world through their servants, the Seers of the Throne, a group of mostly antagonistic mages that worship the Exarchs. Despite their efforts at preventing new mages from being created, some prospective mages still break through to the Supernal Realm due to the intervention of five Watchtowers in the Supernal Realm which regularly awaken candidates. Exactly what created the Watchtowers is unknown, though some mages believe they were created by ascended mages from Atlantis who oppose the Exarchs, known as Oracles.

The Exarchs and the Seers of the Throne are opposed by the Pentacle, which is composed of four Diamond Orders and the Free Council. Most mages, including especially most player characters, are part of the Pentacle. The Pentacle seeks to eventually break the control of the Exarchs and overcome the Lie.

== Characters ==
The process of awakening can be slow or fast, but there are two major ways in which the event may manifest: the Waking World Dream (in which the mage's senses blur the real world and the magical symbolism of their awakening) and the Supernal Journey (which takes place entirely within a dreamscape of the prospective mage). In both sorts of "awakenings", the mage-to-be goes on a journey that culminates with them arriving at or in their respective Tower and (literally or metaphorically) inscribing their name upon it.

=== Paths and Orders ===
There are five Paths of Magic that have a sympathetic connection to one of the Five Watchtowers, each with a particular style and focus. A Mage's Path is decided with his or her awakening.

- Acanthus: Enchanters who work with luck, intuition and destiny.
- Mastigos: Warlocks who work with perception and inner demons.
- Moros: Necromancers who work with death, mortality and material things.
- Obrimos: Theurgists who work with the divine and mundane energies infusing the world.
- Thyrsus: Shamans who work with all aspects of the natural world.

After awakening, a mage typically joins one of the five Pentacle orders. A mage with no order is called a Nameless mage. Most Nameless mages haven't joined an Order simply due to lack of opportunity to join one, and do once the opportunity arises. A few mages choose to not join any order and are called apostates. Others join smaller order-like organizations known as Nameless Orders. The Pentacle are united in their opposition to the Exarchs, and four of their number (known as the Diamond Orders) claim a heritage going back to the First City.

- The Adamantine Arrow: spiritual warriors and masters of conflict, who claim a heritage going back to the First City's defenders. Currently, the Order of the Arrow could perhaps be described as something akin to a knightly sect, though bushido and other warrior codes find a place in The Arrow. These mages conduct intensive physical and mental training, honing the minds and bodies of other members into deadly weapons which magical society may then wield against its enemies (such as vampires, werewolves, Seers of the Throne, and so on).
- Guardians of the Veil: spies and conspirators who claim their descent from the intelligence officers and enforcers of the First City's laws. Currently, they bear a resemblance to a combination of many occult conspiracies, such as the Thule. Many obscure their activities and identities even from other mages, and act as a check on humanity's dangerous curiosity for "that which man was not meant to know".
- The Mysterium: dedicated to pursuit of magical lore and the acquisition, cataloguing, and study of mystical and occult knowledge and artifacts. The "mystagogues" (as they are called) continue the ancient heritage of the scholarly and intellectual of Atlantean society. Their internal structure often resembles the academic structures of the part of the world in which they reside. The Mysterium gathers, catalogues and maintains items of all types of magical and historical significance.
- The Silver Ladder: dedicated to ruling, guiding and reshaping the world, the viziers, senators and priests of the First City remain in force. Politicians and authoritarians, the théarchs believe in creating a perfect hierarchy (with themselves at the top, of course) which will seize control of reality, subjugating it to the will of mankind.
- The Free Council: modernists who wish to create new forms of magic, a union of mages who have discovered ways of using magic that do not adhere to the Atlantean methods, joining the other orders during the Industrial Revolution after their previous form rejected an offer from the Seers. The "Libertines", as they are also called, possess a strong belief in democratic process and anti-authoritarianism.

The Orders have competing agendas and opposing beliefs, leading to a lack of cooperation and trust, however this does not lead to open warfare between the Orders. When enemies of the Orders, such as the Seers of the Throne, appear, the Orders put aside their differences, as their squabbles are petty compared to the battle between the Oracles and the Exarchs.

=== Legacies ===
Legacies are an optional third grouping, portrayed as refinements of one's soul that are passed on from master to student. These grant additional innate benefits, including abilities and gifts called Attainments, which are exempt from the usual Paradox. Some Legacies are known as "left-handed", a name meaning that mages widely disapprove of membership in that legacy, usually due to the left-handed legacy encouraging taboo practices such as destroying artifacts, consuming souls, or abandoning one's mortal body. They are largely meant as antagonists rather than player characters.

== Magic ==
Magic is simply the ability of a mage (or "willworker") to impose their will onto reality. Mages are able to do this because of their sympathetic connection to the Watchtowers in the Supernal Realms, because their names are inscribed upon it, and because they realize the Fallen World is a lie.

A mage's power, or level of awakening and understanding of the depths of the Supernal, is called Gnosis.

Arcana represent the understanding a mage has over particular facets of reality, and govern their ability to affect those aspects. Subtle Arcana (Death, Fate, Mind, Prime, and Spirit) are those that deal with the more ephemeral matters of existence, while Gross Arcana (Forces, Life, Matter, Space, and Time) are those relating to the physical aspects of the world.

=== Covert and Vulgar Spells ===
Covert spells are those that do not outwardly appear magical, and therefore do not automatically risk backfiring (called Paradox), while Vulgar spells are unmistakably magical, and risk backfiring. All spells have a greater risk of Paradox when they are cast in the presence of Sleepers, or non-Awakened humans. Supernatural beings, or humans that have some hint of the supernatural about them (i.e. Ghouls, Sleepwalkers, and Wolfblooded) do not contribute to Paradox.

== Antagonists ==
- Seers of the Throne: The Seers are Awakened who have sworn service to the Exarchs. They claim to follow the will of the Exarchs, and seek to remove magic from the world, enforce power structures that support unquestioning obedience, and strengthen the Lie. Seers believe that an Exarch is a man-made-god, and serve them in the hopes that once they succeed in destroying those that oppose them they will be rewarded by their distant masters.
- The Banishers: Banishers are warped Mages who dedicate themselves to destroying other Mages. Generally speaking, their Awakening was traumatic, undesired, and misunderstood, and they do not accept their mystical powers. They exist outside of normal mage society, and are often obsessed with hunting and killing other mages, usually driven by a desire for repentance or a belief that doing so will cause their life to be returned to normal.
- The Mad: Mad are Mages whose Awakening caused them to lose their minds, rendering them insane mystics who use their magic for their own mad ends.
- Abyssal Entities: The monstrous, alien beings that originate beyond the threshold of existence, in the Abyssal gulf between the Supernal Realm and the Fallen World. Three major types exist: Annunaki, Acamoth, and Gulmoth.
  - Annunaki are extremely powerful Abyssal entities that cannot leave the Abyss. They represent whole alternate alien realities. The one Annunaku that has been described in detail is the Prince of Ten Thousand Leaves, an alternate timeline where cannibalism is commonplace.
  - Acamoth are parasitic Goetia-like entities that reside inside the consciousness of humans. They often either tempt their host to do something monstrous or alien or both, or else cause some kind of strange affliction in their host.
  - Gulmoth are spirit-like Abyssal entities. They exist either in Twilight or in the physical world, and physically cause harm to humans.
- The Scelesti: Mortal mages who serve/worship the Abyss are known as "Scelesti" (sing. Scelestus), or simply "The Wicked". They serve the "Divine Purity" of the Abyss and seek the end of all things. They are hunted as heretics and abominations by all other Mages.
- Goetic Demons: Goetia is a practice that mages use that summons the vices of their minds into a physical form, in the belief that it will make them possible to subdue, or even destroy. Quite often, however, a Goetic mage will summon an "inner demon" that is too powerful for him to defeat, and it will escape, or even take control of the overconfident mage.
- Tremere Liches: A Left-Handed Legacy of Liches who consume the souls of others in exchange for immortality and power. Their name and origins are a reference to the clan of the same name, from the old World of Darkness vampire game.
- Witch Hunters: Mortals who seek out and destroy mages for ideological reasons.

== Production and release ==
Mage: The Awakening was published by White Wolf Publishing on August 29, 2005, as a 400-page hardcover book, following a pre-release sale at the gaming convention Gen Con on August 18–21. The game had originally been planned to be released two weeks earlier, but was delayed as developer Bill Bridges and the game design team wanted to refine and further detail the game's magic system, adding 80 pages of content in the process. Fantasy artist Michael Kaluta was the sole artist for the core rulebook's interior art, drawing over 100 illustrations for it.

== Books ==
=== First edition (2005–2013) ===
Game books for Mage: The Awakening's first edition
Title	Original release	ISBN	Publisher	Notes
Mage: The Awakening	August 29, 2005	1-58846-418-0	White Wolf Publishing	Core rulebook for the game's first edition
Boston Unveiled	October 2005	1-58846-419-9	White Wolf Publishing	Sourcebook for Boston
Sanctum and Sigil	November 2005	1-58846-420-2	White Wolf Publishing	Sourcebook for mage society and politics
Legacies: The Sublime	January 2006	1-58846-425-3	White Wolf Publishing	Sourcebook for mage legacies
Guardians of the Veil	February 2006	1-58846-426-1	White Wolf Publishing	Sourcebook for the culture and history of Atlantis
Tome of the Watchtowers: A Guide to Paths	April 17, 2006	1-58846-427-X	White Wolf Publishing	Sourcebook for magic paths
Secrets of the Ruined Temple	May 2006	1-58846-422-9	White Wolf Publishing	
Reign of the Exarchs	July 2006	1-58846-428-8	White Wolf Publishing	
Tome of the Mysteries	November 2006	1-58846-429-6	White Wolf Publishing	Sourcebook for the game's magic system
Legacies: The Ancient	January 2007	1-58846-430-X	White Wolf Publishing	
Intruders: Encounters With the Abyss	March 2007	1-58846-431-8	White Wolf Publishing	
The Free Council	May 2007	978-1-58846-432-3	White Wolf Publishing	
Magical Traditions	June 2007	978-1-58846-433-0	White Wolf Publishing	
The Mysterium	September 2007	978-1-58846-434-7	White Wolf Publishing	
Astral Realms	November 2007	978-1-58846-435-4	White Wolf Publishing	
The Adamantine Arrow	January 2008	978-158846-436-1	White Wolf Publishing	
Banishers	March 2008	978-158846-440-8	White Wolf Publishing	Sourcebook for banishers, also known as timori
Lines of Power	April 2008	—N/a	White Wolf Publishing	Only released digitally.
Grimoire of Grimoires	May 2008	978-1-58846-437-8	White Wolf Publishing	
The Silver Ladder	July 2008	978-1-58846-438-5	White Wolf Publishing	
Keys to the Supernal Tarot	November 2008	978-1-58846-439-2	White Wolf Publishing	
Seers of the Throne	February 2009	978-1-58846-358-6	White Wolf Publishing	
Summoners	April 2009	978-1-58846-365-4	White Wolf Publishing	
Ready-Made Player Characters: The Heirs of Ahna	June 2009	—N/a	White Wolf Publishing	Only released digitally.
The Abedju Cipher	July 2009	—N/a	White Wolf Publishing	Only released digitally.
Night Horrors: The Unbidden	January 2010	978-1-58846-378-4	White Wolf Publishing	
Mage Chronicler's Guide	July 2010	978-1-58846-386-9	White Wolf Publishing	
Mage Noir	March 2011	—N/a	White Wolf Publishing	
Imperial Mysteries	January 2012	—N/a	White Wolf Publishing	
Left-Hand Path	November 7, 2012	—N/a	Onyx Path Publishing	
Mage Translation Guide	May 27, 2013	—N/a	Onyx Path Publishing	Guide for porting elements between Mage: The Ascension and Mage: The Awakening

=== Second edition (2016–present) ===
Game books for Mage: The Awakening's second edition
Title	Original release	ISBN	Publisher	Notes
Mage: The Awakening Second Edition	May 4, 2016	—N/a	Onyx Path Publishing	Core rulebook for the game's second edition
Signs of Sorcery	June 19, 2019	—N/a	Onyx Path Publishing	Sourcebook for supernatural mysteries
Night Horrors: Nameless and Accursed	March 11, 2020	—N/a	Onyx Path Publishing	Sourcebook for awakened antagonists
Tome of the Pentacle	TBA	TBA	Onyx Path Publishing	Sourcebook about the history of each order

== Related media ==
White Wolf Publishing released an adaptation of Mage: The Awakening by Eddy Webb for the live-action role-playing game Mind's Eye Theatre in 2007.

== Reception ==
Mage: The Awakening won the 2006 Gold ENnie Award for "Best Writing".

== Reviews ==
- Coleção Dragon Slayer
- Pyramid
- Rebel Times #10
- Rue Morgue #57
- Rue Morgue #106
