= Richard Dansky =

American writer and game designer

Richard "Rich" Dansky
- Education: Wesleyan University
- Occupations: Writer Game Designer and Narrative Director
- Website: http://www.richarddansky.com

Richard Dansky is an American writer and a designer of both computer games and role-playing games. He has also published nine novels and two short story collections, as well as in the nonfiction arena.

== Early life and education ==
Richard Dansky was born in Brooklyn, New York, but moved to Cheltenham, Pennsylvania outside of Philadelphia before his fifth birthday. He grew up there and attended Cheltenham High School. In the late 1980s and early 1990s Dansky attended Wesleyan University in Middletown, Connecticut. He graduated with Honors, then received an MA with Distinction from Boston College.

== Personal life ==
Dansky is an enthusiast of cryptids, and in particular of Sasquatch or Bigfoot. He is also known for his extensive scotch collection and library of horror novels. He is a devotee of progressive rock and the Southern rock band the Drive-By Truckers.

== Career ==
After starting as a freelancer on books including Haunts and Changeling: The Dreaming, Dansky worked in-house for four years as a game developer for White Wolf, Inc. where he was the line developer on games such as Wraith: The Oblivion and Vampire: The Dark Ages. He also had stints as a developer on the Mind's Eye Theatre, Kindred of the East, and other game lines, and wrote and/or designed for all of the World of Darkness lines as well as Exalted and Trinity. He has written, designed, or otherwise contributed to over a hundred role-playing sourcebooks. Among his most notable works were the original Laws of the Night rules for live-action Vampire, Wraith: The Oblivion 20th Anniversary Edition, and the sourcebook Charnel Houses of Europe: The Shoah. Since leaving White Wolf he has occasionally contributed to various White Wolf and Onyx Path products, as well as games such as Prince Valiant, Solemn Vale, Alas Vegas, Star Trek, and Nevermore. As a result of his work on the Star Trek RPG, he was briefly the world's leading expert on Danebian Slime Devils.

He worked for Red Storm Entertainment, first as a game designer, and then as Manager of Design. He held the title of Central Tom Clancy's Writer for Ubisoft (Red Storm's parent company). His credits include Rainbow Six: Raven Shield, Far Cry, Splinter Cell: Conviction and Splinter Cell: Blacklist, Ghost Recon Future Soldier, The Division and The Division 2, Assassin's Creed Nexus VR and many others. He served as a central narrative resource for the larger Tom Clancy's franchise, and also was a key worldbuilder for the revived Might and Magic franchise. In 2023 he left Red Storm and joined Crytek to work as the Franchise Narrative Director on the game Hunt: Showdown. He departed Crytek at the end of 2024 to join Romero Games until July 2025.

Dansky has published four media tie-in novels through White Wolf, including Clan Novel Lasombra and the Trilogy of the Second Age for Exalted. He also wrote a tie-in novel for Ghost Recon: Wildlands entitled Dark Waters (Ubisoft, 2017). His original fiction includes the novella Shadows In Green (Yard Dog Press, 2004); the novels Firefly Rain (Wizards of the Coast Discoveries, 2008), Vaporware (JournalStone, 2013), Ghost of a Marriage (Crossroad Press, 2022) and Ghosts of Smoke and Flame (Independent, 2026); and the short story collections Snowbird Gothic (Crossroad Press, 2018) and A Meeting In The Devil's House (Twisted Publishing, 2023). His short fiction has appeared in numerous magazines and anthologies including PseudoPod, Dark Faith, Cosmic Horror Monthly, and Madness on the Orient Express. His writing has consistently garnered praise for its versatility and power.

Dansky's first non-fiction publication came in the academic journal Lovecraft Studies. He has since published widely in magazines and books including Green Man Review, Studies in Weird Fiction, The 100 Greatest Games series from Green Ronin, the sports blog Off-Tackle Empire, and has written for numerous collections of film essays from Ghost Show Press. His most recent non-fiction book is The Video Game Writer's Guide to Surviving an Industry That Hates You (CRC, 2025).

In 2026, Dansky received the inaugural Lifetime Achievement Award for Game Writing from the IGDA Game Writing SIG, the world's oldest professional organization dedicated to supporting game writing. In 2009 he was identified as one of the top 20 video game writers in the world by Game Developer. A former executive of the IGDA Game Writing Special Interest Group, he has served on the advisory board of the Game Narrative Summit at GDC for close to two decades. He also adjudicated the annual Student Game Narrative Analysis Competition at GDC, helping the winning students to present poster sessions at the conference. For many years, he curated the Narrative track at East Coast Game Conference in Raleigh, North Carolina. He has also contributed to numerous books on game narrative, including Game Writing: Narrative Skills for Videogames and On Writing Horror.

His namesake, Rich Dansky, appears as a player character in the scenario "And I Feel Fine," by Geoffrey C. Grabowski, which was published in the One Shots sourcebook for Unknown Armies. He has also been referenced in Alan Wake and Far Cry 5, which features an extended side quest for a missing Bigfoot researcher named Dansky.
