= List of Changeling: The Dreaming books =

Game books for Changeling: The Dreaming

Changeling: The Dreaming is a tabletop role-playing game in the World of Darkness series, where players take the roles of changelings. It was first released by White Wolf Publishing in 1995, and released in new editions in 1997 (second edition) and 2017 (20th Anniversary Edition), which brought updates to the game rules. These have been supported with supplementary game books, expanding the game mechanics and setting. The books from the game's original run in 1995–2001 were published by White Wolf Publishing, whereas the books for the 20th Anniversary Edition were published by Onyx Path Publishing, a company formed by ex–White Wolf Publishing staff.

The supplements include the Kithbook series, describing the different types of fae; the Book of Houses line, describing noble houses; sourcebooks about character types and factions; books describing locations as they are portrayed in the setting; game guides; and various other books. The line was well regarded by critics for its artwork and for evocative writing; it was also commercially successful, but not enough to warrant being developed on the higher budget at which White Wolf Publishing normally operated, leading it to be moved to their lower-budget imprint Arthaus in 1998, where it performed well.

== Books ==
=== First edition (1995–1997) ===
Game books for Changeling: The Dreaming's first edition
Title	Original release	ISBN	Publisher	Notes
Changeling: The Dreaming	July 1995	1-56504-700-1	White Wolf Publishing	Core rulebook for the game's first edition. An early role-playing game book to be printed in full color. Uses a magic system requiring cards sold separately from the book. Went under the working title Fairie.
Book of Storyteller Secrets	August 1995	1-56504-702-8	White Wolf Publishing	Booklet featuring the adventure "Quixote Syndrome" and information about crossover play with other World of Darkness games. Bundled with storyteller (Note: The person leading the game is called the "storyteller" in World of Darkness games, a role called "gamemaster" or "dungeon master" in other role-playing games.) screen.
Immortal Eyes: The Toybox	October 1995	1-56504-703-6	White Wolf Publishing	Adventure module continuing from the story "Toys will be Toys" in the core rulebook, and a sourcebook for San Francisco. First in the Immortal Eyes trilogy.
Players Kit	November–December 1995	1-56504-704-4	White Wolf Publishing	Booklet about the price for casting cantrips
Freeholds & Hidden Glens	December 1995	1-56504-706-0	White Wolf Publishing	Sourcebook for sites of glamour
Rage Across Appalachia	December 1995	1-56504-313-8	White Wolf Publishing	Sourcebook for Appalachia. Crossover with Werewolf: The Apocalypse.
The Autumn People	February 1996	1-56504-709-5	White Wolf Publishing	Sourcebook for autumn people – humans whose normality hurts changelings through ennui
Nobles: The Shining Host	March 1996	1-56504-711-7	White Wolf Publishing	Sourcebook for sidhes and nobility
Immortal Eyes: Shadows on the Hill	April–May 1996	1-56504-705-2	White Wolf Publishing	Adventure module continuing from The Toybox, and a sourcebook for Hawaii. Second in the Immortal Eyes trilogy.
Players Guide	July 1996	1-56504-701-X	White Wolf Publishing	Guide to the game for players, introducing new character types and rules
Immortal Eyes: Court of all Kings	July–September 1996	1-56504-713-3	White Wolf Publishing	Adventure module continuing from Shadows on the Hill, and a sourcebook for Ireland. Third in the Immortal Eyes trilogy.
Kithbook: Trolls	1996	1-56504-725-7	White Wolf Publishing	Sourcebook for trolls
The Shadow Court	January 1997	1-56504-710-9	White Wolf Publishing	Sourcebook for the Unseelie and the Shadow Court
Isle of the Mighty	April–May 1997	1-56504-712-5	White Wolf Publishing	Sourcebook for the British Isles. Crossover with Mage: The Ascension.
Kithbook: Sluagh	April–May 1997	1-56504-726-5	White Wolf Publishing	Sourcebook for sluagh
The Enchanted	May–June 1997	1-56504-714-1	White Wolf Publishing	Sourcebook for humans' interactions with changelings

=== Second edition (1997–2001) ===
Game books for Changeling: The Dreaming's second edition
Title	Original release	ISBN	Publisher	Notes
Changeling: The Dreaming	August 7, 1997	1-56504-716-8	White Wolf Publishing	Core rulebook for the game's second edition. Has a redesigned magic system that no longer requires cards.
Book of Lost Dreams	September 1997	1-56504-717-6	White Wolf Publishing	Booklet containing cantrip and combat rules, and the adventure "Capture the Flag". Bundled with storyteller screen.
Kithbook: Nockers	October–November 1997	1-56504-727-3	White Wolf Publishing	Sourcebook for nockers
Dreams and Nightmares	November–December 1997	1-56504-718-4	White Wolf Publishing	Sourcebook for the Dreaming
Noblesse Oblige: The Book of Houses	February–April 1998	1-56504-719-2	White Wolf Publishing	Sourcebook for the five noble houses of the Seelie Court
Kithbook: Satyrs	April 1998	1-56504-728-1	White Wolf Publishing	Sourcebook for satyrs
Kingdom of Willows	June 1998	1-56504-720-6	White Wolf Publishing	Sourcebook for the Southeastern United States
Changeling Storytellers Guide	June–August 1998	1-56504-708-7	White Wolf Publishing	Guide to the game for storytellers, introducing new magic rules
Inanimae: The Secret Way	August–October 1998	1-56504-721-4	White Wolf Publishing	Sourcebook for inanimae – spirits tied to inanimate and elemental objects, such as ondines
Land of Eight Million Dreams	December 1998	1-56504-722-2	White Wolf Publishing	Sourcebook for changelings in Asia
The Fool's Luck: The Way of the Commoner	February 1999	1-56504-715-X	White Wolf Publishing	Sourcebook for changeling commoners
Pour L'Amour et Liberte: The Book of Houses 2	June–August 1999	1-56504-723-0	White Wolf Publishing	Sourcebook for the three houses of the Unseelie Court
Denizens of the Dreaming	1999	1-56504-734-6	White Wolf Publishing	Sourcebook for fae in service of the Fomorians
Kithbook: Pooka	1999	1-56504-729-X	White Wolf Publishing	Sourcebook for pooka
Kithbook: Redcaps	1999	1-56504-482-7	White Wolf Publishing	Sourcebook for redcaps
Trolle, Träumer, tiefe Wälder	2000	3-931612-88-0	Feder & Schwert	Sourcebook for fae in Germany, by the game's German publisher. Title translates to "Trolls, Dreamers, Deep Forests".
War in Concordia: The Shattered Dream	March 2001	1-56504-724-9	White Wolf Publishing	Sourcebook covering the political turmoil following the disappearance of High King David
Book of Lost Houses: The Second Coming	May 2001	1-56504-483-5	White Wolf Publishing	Sourcebook for five noble houses that only recently exited Arcadia
Kithbook: Eshu	September 2001	1-56504-785-0	White Wolf Publishing	Sourcebook for eshu
Book of Glamour	Unreleased	1-56504-497-5	White Wolf Publishing	Sourcebook about magic and glamour. Was planned for release in September 2001.
Keys to the Kingdom	Unreleased	1-58846-776-7	White Wolf Publishing	Adventure module set in the Middle East, Egypt, and South America. Was planned for release in December 2001.

=== 20th Anniversary Edition (2017–2019) ===
Game books for Changeling: The Dreaming 20th Anniversary Edition
Title	Original release	ISBN	Publisher	Notes
Changeling: The Dreaming 20th Anniversary Edition	September 13, 2017	—N/a	Onyx Path Publishing	Core rulebook for the game's 20th Anniversary Edition
Yours to Keep	September 20, 2017	—N/a	Onyx Path Publishing	Introduction to the game, with an adventure, brief rules, and pre-made characters
Changeling: The Dreaming Ready Made Characters	March 21, 2018	—N/a	Onyx Path Publishing	Sourcebook containing playable characters and story hooks
Book of Freeholds	May 9, 2018	—N/a	Onyx Path Publishing	Sourcebook for fae shelters and havens
Kithbook: Boggans	June 20, 2018	—N/a	Onyx Path Publishing	Sourcebook for boggans. Originally planned to be released by White Wolf Publishing in 2002.
Changeling: The Dreaming Player's Guide	July 3, 2019	—N/a	Onyx Path Publishing	Guide to the game for players, introducing new character types and rules
