= Kelly Barnes Dam =

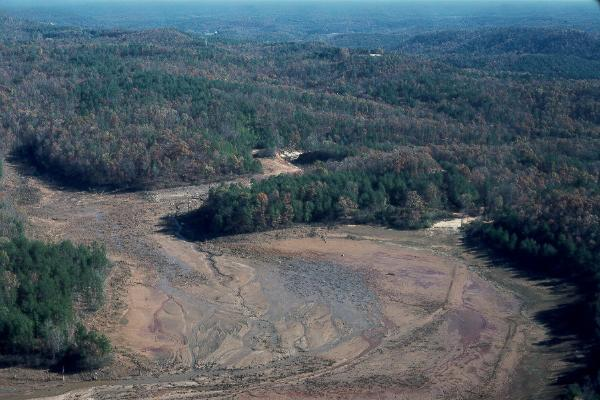
- View of former reservoir area after the dam failure
- Interactive map of Kelly Barnes Dam
- Location: Stephens County, Georgia, U.S.
- Coordinates: 34°36′02″N 83°21′47″W
- Opening date: 1899
- Demolition date: November 6, 1977

Dam and spillways
- Type of dam: Embankment dam
- Height: 12 m (39 ft)
- Length: 120 m (394 ft)
- Width (crest): 20 feet

Reservoir
- Creates: Barnes Lake
- Total capacity: 505,730 m^{3} (17.86 million ft^{3})

Power Station
- Commission date: 1899
- Installed capacity: 0.2 MW

Kelly Barnes Dam was an earthen embankment dam on Toccoa Creek in Stephens County, Georgia, United States, just outside the city of Toccoa. Heavy rainfall caused it to collapse on November 6, 1977, and the resulting flood killed 39 people and caused $2.8 million in damage. The dam was never rebuilt.

A memorial to the dead stands downstream, by Toccoa Falls on the campus of Toccoa Falls College.

== History ==
In 1899, a rock crib dam was built by E. P. Simpson on Tocco Creek to create a reservoir for a small hydroelectric power plant that began operating that same year. The plant, now a historical site on the Toccoa Falls College campus called the Old Toccoa Falls Power Plant, produced 200 kW for the town of Toccoa, Georgia. The power plant was transferred in 1933 to the Toccoa Falls Institute, which decided to develop a more stable electric power source and built an earthen embankment dam over the original rock crib dam between 1939 and 1940. After World War II, the dam was again raised, creating Barnes Lake, a 40-acre (16 ha) reservoir. The modifications provided power for Toccoa Falls Institute until 1957, when the power production was stopped, and the lake was thereafter used only for recreation.

== Dam characteristics ==
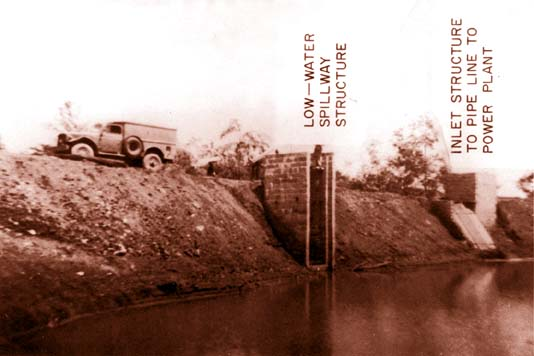
View of masonry inlet structures on rear of dam embankment

The dam was modified several times, ultimately measuring 38 feet (12 m) high, 400 feet (120 m) long and 20 feet (6.1 m) wide at its crest. The dam had two uncontrolled earthen spillways. The main spillway was 380 feet (120 m) long, 11–60 feet (3.4–18.3 m) wide and located on the left side of the structure. A low point on the right side and away from the dam could also be used as a secondary spillway when the reservoir levels became too high.

The embankment dam was located about 2,000 feet (610 m) upstream from the Toccoa Falls and mostly consisted of residual soils and silt. The dam sat on a foundation of silt and stable biotite gneiss (rock).

Within the dam embankment were two masonry structures. One helped support a pipe that was used as a low-level spillway. The other contained a penstock (pipe) for the hydroelectricity power plant. Neither was being used at the time of the flood.

== Dam failure ==
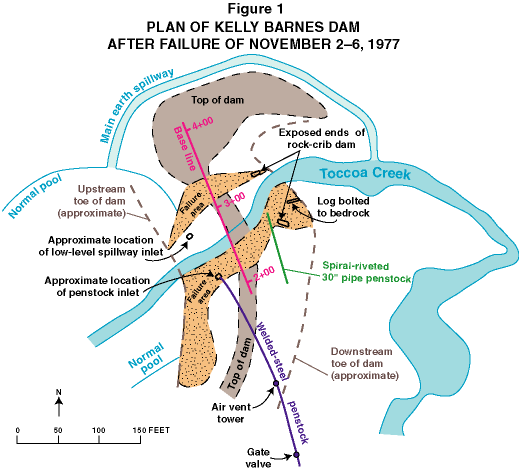
Plan after Kelly Barnes Dam failure

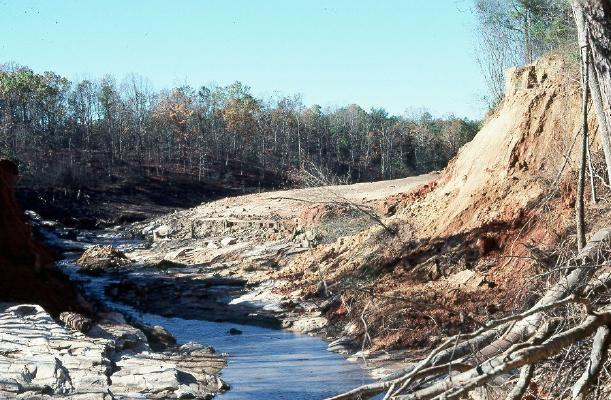
Looking upstream through dam breach, November 7, 1977

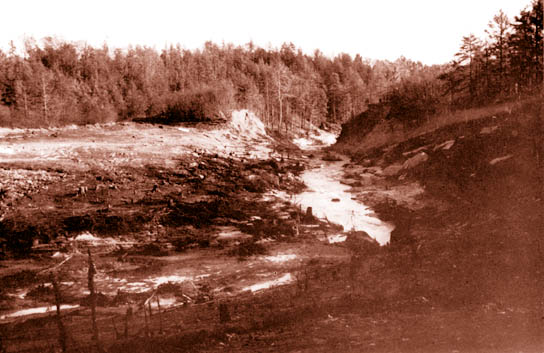
Looking upstream through dam break, November 7, 1977

On November 6, 1977, at 1:30 am, the Kelly Barnes Dam failed after four days of heavy rain: seven inches (180 mm) had fallen from November 2 to 5—half of that between 6 pm and midnight on November 5. The rain swelled Barnes Lake, which normally held 17.86 million cubic feet (505,730 cubic meters) of water, to an estimated 27,442,800 cubic feet (777,090 m^{3}) of water.

A total of 200 feet (61 m) of the dam failed, causing a peak of 24,000 cubic feet per second (680 m^{3}/s) maximum discharge to burst downstream.

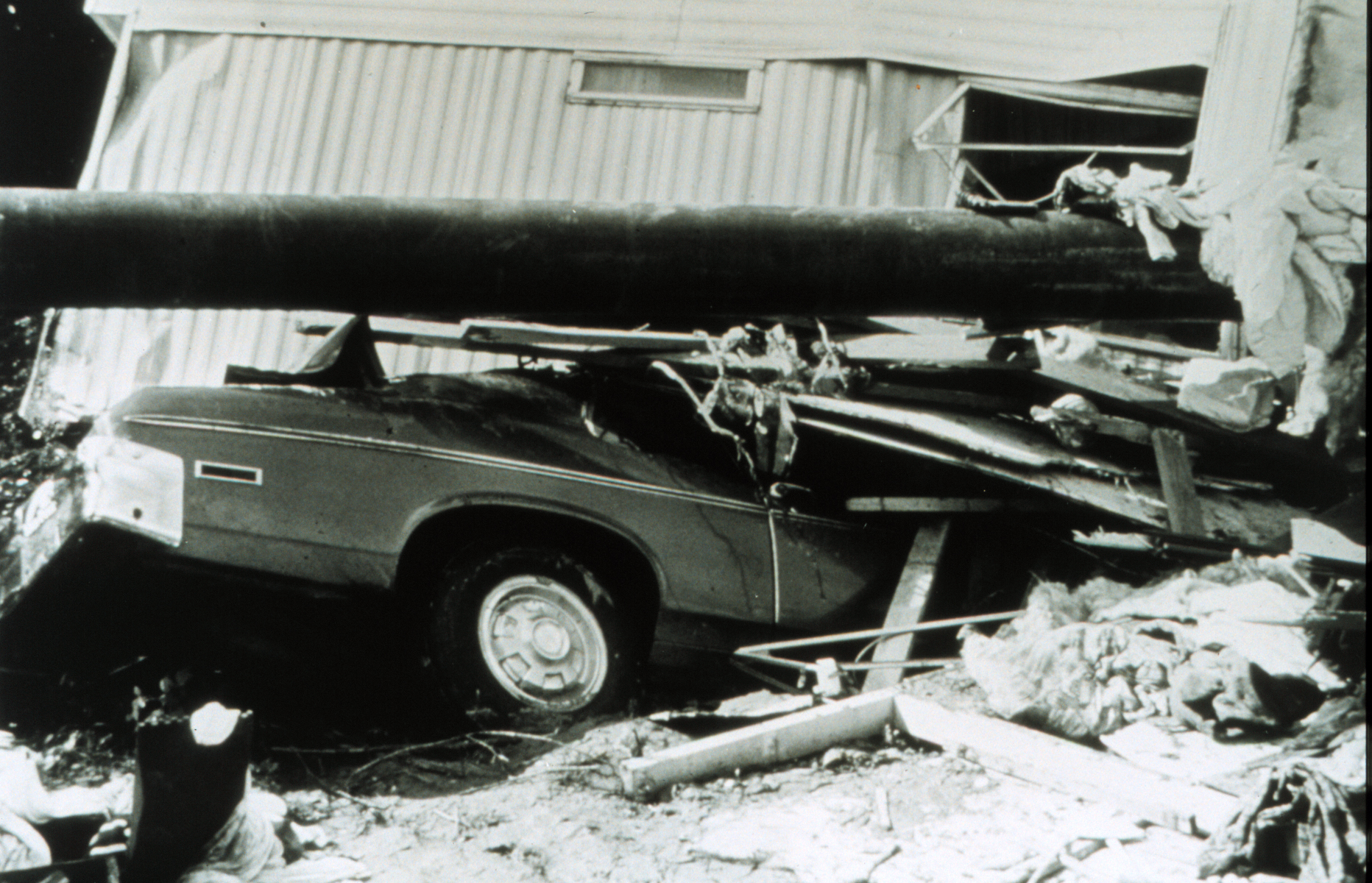
Trailer, vehicle, and utility pole in jumbled pile following the flood, November 7, 1977. From the NOAA Photo Library

The flood killed 39 people and destroyed nine houses, 18 mobile homes, two college buildings and many motor vehicles. Five houses and five college buildings were also damaged. Two bridges on Toccoa Falls Drive and a culvert at County Farm Road were completely destroyed. The embankments at Georgia State Route 17 were destroyed on either side of the bridge, and one of the bridge abutments at Highview Road was destroyed. The water-supply pipe for the city of Toccoa was damaged and the city's water supply was contaminated for several days. The cost of the damage was $2.8 million.

After the flood, Georgia's Governor George Busbee called for an immediate investigation, which was carried out by a Federal Investigative Board of the United States Geological Survey. Their report was released December 21, 1977, with no specific causes cited for the failure. The investigators had no engineering plans for the dam and records of construction on the dam were based on witnesses, pictures, and newspaper articles.

The investigation did, however, cite several possible or probable causes. The failure of the dam's slope may have contributed to weakness in the structure, particularly in the heavy rain. A collapse of the low-level spillway could have also exacerbated this problem. A 1973 photo showed a 12-foot-high (3.7 m), 30-foot-wide (9.1 m) slide had occurred on the downstream face of the dam, which may have also contributed or foreshadowed the dam failure. Overall, the dam itself was in poor condition and lacked a sufficient design.

== See also ==
- Buffalo Creek Flood
- Johnstown Flood
- St. Francis Dam
- South Fork Dam
- Teton Dam
