= James A. Moore =

American novelist (1965–2024)

- Born: September 3, 1965; Atlanta, Georgia, U.S.
- Died: March 27, 2024 (aged 58)
- Occupation: Writer
- Writing career
- Period: 1994–2024
- Genres: Horror fiction, fantasy, science fiction
- Website: jamesamoorebooks.com

James Arthur Moore (September 3, 1965 – March 27, 2024) was an American horror novelist and short story writer, and role-playing game author. He wrote more than fifty books.

== Personal life ==
James Arthur Moore was born in Atlanta, Georgia, on September 3, 1965. Moore was married to Tessa Moore. He died on March 27, 2024, at the age of 58.

== Career ==
Moore wrote more than fifty horror and fantasy books. He wrote the novelization of Buffy the Vampire Slayer's Chaos Bleeds (based on the video game written by Christopher Golden). He also contributed as a comics writer.

Moore wrote works related to collectible card games and role-playing games, including the World of Darkness franchise.

== Accolades ==
In 2003, Moore was nominated for a Bram Stoker Award for Bloodstained Oz (2006), The Haunted Forest Tour (2007), Blind Shadows (2012), Congregations of the Dead (2013), Bloodstained Wonderland (2017), A Hell Within (2018), and Stalking Shadows (2020).

He co-edited The Twister Book of Shadows (2019), winner of the Shirley Jackson Award and a Bram Stoker Award finalist.

== Selected bibliography ==
=== Novels and novellas ===
- Subject Seven (Razorbill, 2011)
- Vendetta (Morning Star Press, 2009)
- Deeper (Hardcover: Necessary Evil Press, 2008; Paperback: Berkley, 2009) ISBN 0-425-22821-5

"Dear Diary" - a short story available as a PDF download from Necessary Evil Press that involves a character from the novel Deeper

- Little Boy Blue - a limited edition chapbook (2008, Bloodletting Press)
- The Haunted Forest Tour - Co-authored by Jeff Strand (Earthling Publications, late 2007)
- Blood Red (Earthling Publications, 2005 and Berkley Books, 2007) ISBN 0-425-21759-0

"Blood Tide" (Earthling Publications, 2005) - A limited edition (250 copies) short story that was given away for free at the World Horror Convention in 2005. It also serves as a prologue to Blood Red.

- Newbies (Smooch, 2004) ISBN 0-8439-5474-4
- Buffy the Vampire Slayer: Chaos Bleeds (Simon Spotlight Entertainment, 2003) ISBN 0-7434-2767-X
- Fireworks (Meisha Merlin Publishing, 2001 and Leisure Books, 2003) ISBN 0-8439-5247-4
- Under the Overtree (Meisha Merlin Publishing, 2000 and Leisure Books, 2002) ISBN 0-8439-5110-9

==== Bloodstained series ====
- Bloodstained Oz - Co-authored by Christopher Golden (Earthling Publications, 2006) ISBN 0-9766339-6-5
- Bloodstained Wonderland - contracted and slated (not yet published)
- Bloodstained Neverland - contracted and slated (not yet published)

==== Chris Corin series ====
1. Possessions (Leisure Books, 2004) ISBN 0-8439-5171-0
2. Rabid Growth (Leisure Books, 2005) ISBN 0-8439-5172-9

==== Harvest series ====
1. "Harvest Moon/Harvest Gods" - short story published in Slices
2. "Bone Harvest" - Chapbook limited to 500 copies published by Cemetery Dance Publications, 2008
3. "Patchwork" - 300 copy Limited edition novelette (Bloodletting Press, 2008)
4. Harvest Moon (Cemetery Dance Publications, 2006) ISBN 1-58767-163-8
5. "Shades of Gray" - short story published in Slices (involves a character from the novel Harvest Moon)

==== Serenity Falls "trilogy" ====
This series was originally released as one book published by Meisha Merlin Publishing in 2003. Jove Publishing got the rights to it and reprinted them in an expanded and extended form as three separate books in 2005. There is more story in the new Jove printings.

- Serenity Falls (Meisha Merlin Publishing, 2003) ISBN 1-892065-66-5
1. Writ in Blood (Jove, May 2005) ISBN 0-515-13968-8
2. The Pack (Jove, June 2005) ISBN 0-515-13969-6
3. Dark Carnival (Jove, July 2006) ISBN 0-515-13985-8

==== Seven Forges series ====
1. Seven Forges (Angry Robot, September 2013)
2. The Blasted Lands, Seven Forges Book II (Angry Robot, June 2014)
3. City of Wonders, Seven Forges Book III (Angry Robot, November 2015)
4. The Silent Army, Seven Forges Book IV (Angry Robot, May 2016)
5. The Godless, Seven Forges Book V (Angry Robot, September 2021)
6. The War Born, Seven Forges Book VI (Angry Robot, August 2023)

==== Tides of War series ====
1. The Last Sacrifice (Jan 2017)
2. Fallen Gods (July 2018)
3. Gates of the Dead (Jan 2019)

==== Short stories, anthologies, and collections ====
- Slices - a short story collection (Earthling Publications, 2009). Contains the following:

"Greasepainted Smile"
"Shades of Gray" (Original to this collection)
"War Stories"
"Skinwalker"
"Simon's Muse"
"A Place where there is Peace"
"In the Oubliette" (original to this collection)
"Hathburn Avenue"
"My Brother's Keeper" (original to this collection)
"The Dark Place"
"Harvest Gods"
Story Notes

- Short Trips: Destination Prague - A Doctor Who anthology featuring the short story "Room for Improvement" (Big Finish Productions, 2007) ISBN 1-84435-253-6
- Halloween: New Poems - a poetry anthology edited by Al Sarrantonio that contains the poems "They Grow Pumpkins Down There," "Jack's Lantern," and "Autumn" (Cemetery Dance Publications, 2009) ISBN 978-1-58767-205-7
- The Big Book of NECON, a collection editied by Bob Booth that features the piece "Virtually Perfect" (Cemetery Dance Publications, 2009) ISBN 978-1-58767-202-6
- British Invasion - anthology co-edited by James A. Moore, Christopher Golden, and Tim Lebbon featuring Kealan Patrick Burke, Ramsey Campbell, and many others (Cemetery Dance Publications, 2009) ISBN 978-1-58767-175-3
- Monstrous: 20 Tales of Giant Creature Terror - an anthology edited by Ryan C. Thomas that contains the story "Whatever Became of Randy" (Permuted Press, 2009) ISBN 978-1-934861-12-7

===== Digital chapbooks =====
- Discarded Blessings - a digital-only chapbook collection (Darkside Digital, 2009). Contains the following short stories:
  - "Discards"
  - "Mary's Blessing"
- "The Walker Place" - digital-only chapbook (Cemetery Dance Publications, 2009)
- "Home for the Holidays" - digital-only chapbook (Cemetery Dance Publications, 2008)

=== Gaming related works ===
Most, if not all, of these are set in White Wolf's World of Darkness

==== Vampire: The Eternal Struggle ====
- House of Secrets (a novel co-authored by Kevin Andrew Murphy) ISBN 1-56504-843-1

==== Vampire: The Masquerade ====
- Berlin By Night, a supplement for Vampire: The Masquerade
- Vampire Players Guide Second Edition, includes

"Creative Combat," (an essay)
"The Samedi"

- World of Darkness 2
- Storyteller's Guide
- Demon Hunter X
- Vampire Deluxe Edition
- "Necromancy" section of the Thaumaturgy book.

==== Werewolf: The Apocalypse ====
- Werewolf: Hell-Storm (novel) ISBN 978-0-06-105675-8
- When Will You Rage? (short story included)
- Book of the Wyrm, sections including:

Enticers
Thunderwyrms
"The First Ronin"
"Phantasmi, Bitter Rages"
"Oases"
"Dangerous Toys"

- Book of the Wyrm, Second Edition
- The Valkenburg Foundation includes his story "Skins," (reprinted in Werewolf Chronicles Volume 1).
- The Werewolf Players Guide, sections including:

"Why the Garou Run in Packs" (short story)
"The Get of Fenris"
"The Wendigo"
"The Nuwisha (Werecoyote)"
"Ananasi (Werespider)" (with Brett Brooks)
"Do You Need a Pack?" (essay)

- The Werewolf Players Guide, Second Edition
- Storyteller's Handbook
- "In Dreams and Nightmares," for the Rage Across The Amazon supplement
- "The Black Forest Sept" for the Caerns: Places of Power supplement (reprinted in Werewolf Chronicles Volume 2).
- Three short adventures for the Werewolf Storytellers' Screen
- Outcasts
- The Get of Fenris Tribebook
- Freak Legion: A Player's Guide to Fomori
- Nuwisha
- Werewolf: The Wild West
- Werewolf: The Wild West Companion
- Werewolf: The Wild West Tales from the Trails, Mexico

==== Mage: The Ascension ====
- "Harvest Time" (an adventure for the Chantries supplement)
- The Book of Shadows: The Mage Players Hand Book, sections including:

"The Euthanatos"
"The Hollow Ones"
"Orphans"
"The Nephandi"

- The Chaos Factor (sourcebook and adventure for Mage)
- Book of Madness
- Book of Worlds

==== Wraith: The Oblivion ====
- Necropolis: Atlanta
- Haunts (about Hermitage Castle)
- Dark Kingdom of Jade Adventures: "Hiroshima"

"Mediums" (short story)

- Wraith: The Oblivion, Second Edition
- Wraith Players Guide
- Shadow Players Guide
- Legions
- The Great War

==== Changeling: The Dreaming ====
- Changeling Players Guide
- Dreams and Nightmares
- Land of Eight Million Dreams

==== White Wolf Magazine ====
- Issue #40 contains the short story "A Psychological Profile on Samuel Haight."
- Issues #42- #44 included a three part Werewolf: The Apocalypse adventure.

=== Comic books ===
- Clive Barker's Hellraiser issue #15 featured "Of Love, Cats and Curiosity" (James A. Moore's debut publication)
