= Capture the flag (disambiguation) =

Capture the flag is a traditional outdoor game often played by children where two teams each have a flag and the objective is to capture the other team's flag. It is also a game type found in many video games that feature multiplayer mode.

Capture the flag may also refer to:

- "Capture the Flag", a song by the German thrash metal band Sodom from their 1990 album Better Off Dead
- "Capture the Flag", a song by Broken Social Scene from their 2002 album You Forgot It in People
- Capture the Flag (film), a 2015 Spanish animated adventure comedy family film directed by Enrique Gato
- Capture the Flag (video game)
- "Capture the Flag", a 1997 tabletop role-playing game scenario published in Book of Lost Dreams
- Capture the flag (cybersecurity), a cybersecurity exercise based on the traditional game
- Capture the Flag, a season of the YouTube series Jet Lag: The Game
- "Capture the Flag" (Adderly), a 1986 television episode
