= The Shadow Court =

1997 tabletop role-playing game supplement

- Cover art by Dennis Calero
- Designers: Ian Lemke
- Illustrators: Dennis Calero, Anthony Hightower, Jeff Holt, Fred Hooper, Mark Jackson, Andrew Mitchell Kudelka, Heather J. McKinney-Chernik, Richard Thomas, Drew Tucker
- Writers: Brian Campbell; Jackie Cassada; Nicky Rea
- Publishers: White Wolf Publishing
- Publication: January 1997
- Genres: Tabletop role-playing game supplement
- Systems: Storyteller System
- Parent games: Changeling: The Dreaming
- Series: World of Darkness
- ISBN: 1-56504-710-9

The Shadow Court is a tabletop role-playing game supplement released by White Wolf Publishing in January 1997 for use with their horror fantasy game Changeling: The Dreaming, and is part of the larger World of Darkness series.

The book was developed by Ian Lemke and written by Brian Campbell, Jackie Cassada, and Nicky Rea, who wrote it with a theme of balance and the disruption thereof. It was well received by critics for its writing and atmosphere, and for being useful in game campaigns.

== Contents ==
Some of the interactions in Changeling: The Dreaming involve Seelie and Unseelie fae. The Shadow Court describes Unseelie society, including their traditions, factions, relationships with other evil creatures, festivities, abilities and magic, and their activities on the night of Samhain. The book provides the storyteller (Note: The person leading the game is called the "storyteller" in World of Darkness games, a role called "gamemaster" or "dungeon master" in other role-playing games.) with information and advice about how to present Unseelie non-player characters. The book also describes several notable Unseelie personalities.

== Production and release ==
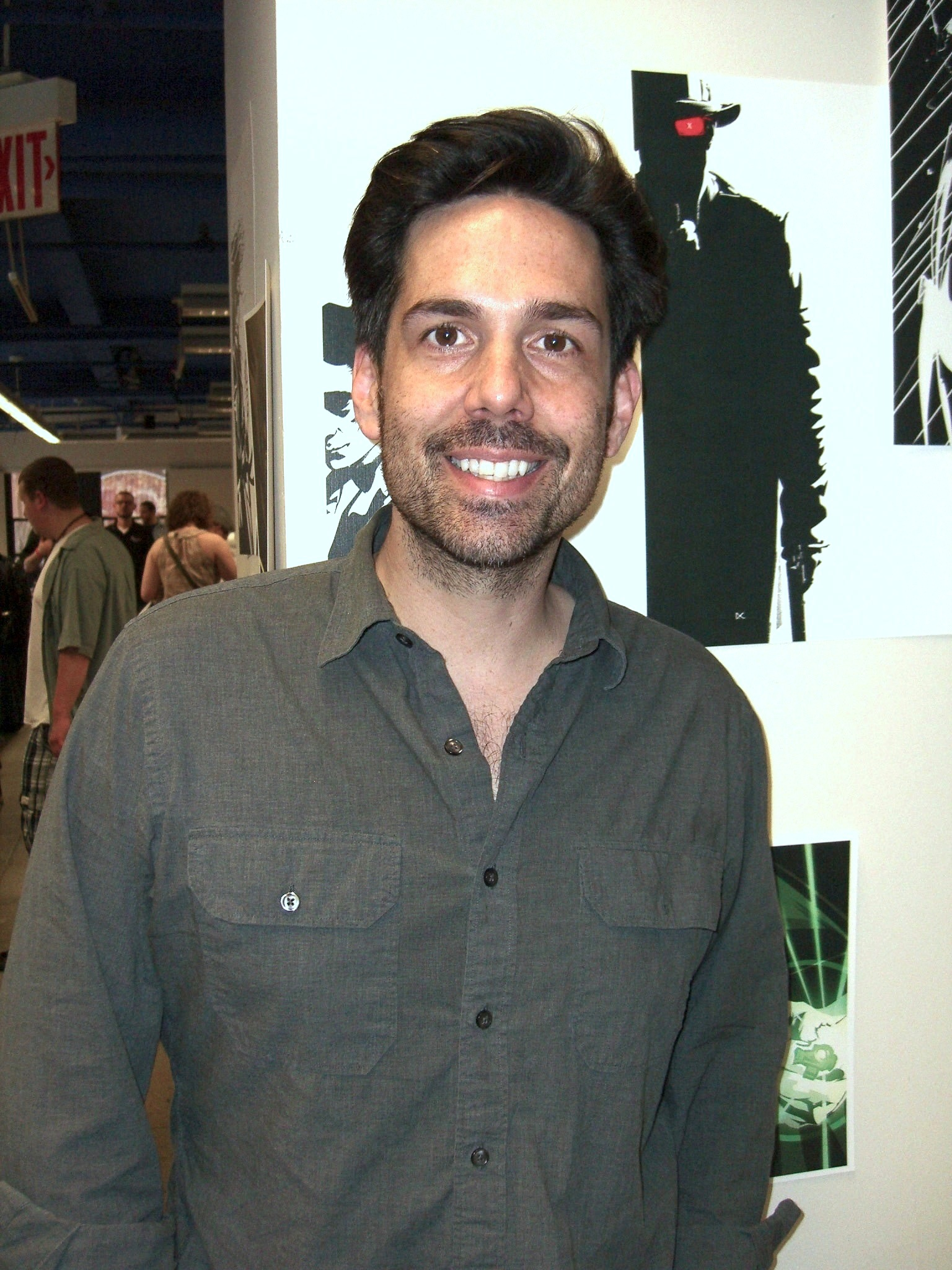
Dennis Calero created the book's cover art.

The Shadow Court was developed by Ian Lemke, and written by Brian Campbell, Jackie Cassada, and Nicky Rea, with interior art by Anthony Hightower, Jeff Holt, Fred Hooper, Mark Jackson, Andrew Mitchell Kudelka, Heather J. McKinney-Chernik, Richard Thomas, and Drew Tucker, and cover art by Dennis Calero. It was written with a theme of balance between changelings' noble Seelie legacies and their renegade Unseelie natures, and the disruption thereof, with heroes having the potential to fall from grace, and villains having the potential to redeem themselves. The production team intended for games using the book to have a mood of deception and intrigue, black comedy, and hope coming only with a price.

The supplement was released by White Wolf Publishing in January 1997 as a 122-page softcover book. It has since been released as an e-book, and was released in Spanish in September 2003.

== Reception ==
Reception
Review scores
Source	Rating
Arcane	6/10
Backstab	8/10
Dosdediez	4/5 stars

The Shadow Court was well received by critics: Backstab described it as brilliant, and essential for any Changeling: The Dreaming campaign, although requiring thoughtful reading by the storyteller. Dosdediez found it to add depth to the game, and highly recommended it to those who want to expand the boundaries of their game. Arcane considered it to live up to the standards set by previous Changeling: The Dreaming books, in terms of production quality, artwork, and style, as well as the short introductory story. French game designer and author Cédric Ferrand called it a near-essential book, which gives the Unseelie more depth.

Critics liked the book's writing and tone; Backstab found it impressive how it manages make the Shadow Court, as a dark, secret society, fit into Changeling: The Dreaming without losing sight of what makes Changeling unique among the World of Darkness games and being aware that it and Vampire: The Masquerade are different types of games. Dosdediez liked the atmosphere of passion, hypocrisy and intrigue, and Casus Belli appreciated its darker tone and its subtlety, but found it less entertaining than hoped. Arcane considered the book to particularly excel in its connection of the Unseelie fae to a cycle of pagan seasonal festivals, but criticized it for not going into enough detail about the Shadow Court itself or revealing secrets relating to them that are hinted at in the core rulebook. The book was considered useful, with praise at the newly introduced dark arts and Unseelie fae; Arcane did wish that it had gone further than just suggesting uses in stories, and that it would have been expanded with a fleshed-out, playable scenario.
