= Book of Lost Dreams =

Tabletop role-playing game supplement

- Cover art by Mark Jackson
- Designers: Ian Lemke
- Illustrators: Mike Chaney, Echo Chernik, Anthony Hightower, Mark Jackson, Brian J. LeBlanc, Matthew Milberger, Aileen E. Miles, Rick O'Brien, Paul S. Phillips, Valerie Valusek
- Writers: Roger Gaudreau; Steve Herman; Ian Lemke
- Publishers: White Wolf Publishing
- Publication: September 1997
- Genres: Tabletop role-playing game supplement
- Systems: Storyteller System
- Parent games: Changeling: The Dreaming
- Series: World of Darkness
- ISBN: 1-56504-717-6

Book of Lost Dreams is a tabletop role-playing game supplement published by White Wolf Publishing in September 1997 for use with the horror game Changeling: The Dreaming, and is part of the World of Darkness series. It introduces expanded rules for cantrips and combat, describes creatures from other World of Darkness games to aid cross-over play, and contains the adventure "Capture the Flag". The book was released together with a storyteller screen, (Note: The person leading the game is called the "storyteller" in World of Darkness games, a role called "gamemaster" or "dungeon master" in other role-playing games.) which contains rules information and tables for storytellers to reference while running a campaign. The book was well received by critics, who considered "Capture the Flag" a good way to introduce players to the Changeling: The Dreaming setting.

== Contents ==
White Wolf published Changeling: The Dreaming in 1995 as the fifth in a series of horror roleplaying games in the "World of Darkness" series. (The first four were: Vampire: The Masquerade (1991), Werewolf: The Apocalypse (1991), Mage: The Ascension (1993), and Wraith: The Oblivion (1994)). Two years later, White Wolf published Book of Lost Dreams to explain how to take characters generated for Changeling and cross them over into any of the other World of Darkness role-playing games. The book also includes new rules for cantrips and combat, as well as a 16-page adventure, "Capture the Flag".

== Production and release ==
Book of Lost Dreams was developed by Ian Lemke, who co-wrote it with Roger Gaudreau and Steve Herman, with additional material written by Brian Campbell, Steve Kenson, and Wayne D. Peacock. The art director for the project was Aileen E. Miles, who worked together with interior artists Mike Chaney, Echo Chernik, Anthony Hightower, Brian J. LeBlanc, Matthew Milberger, Rick O'Brien, Paul S. Phillips, and Valerie Valusek, and cover artist Mark Jackson.

A lot of the material in the book had originally been intended by Lemke to be part of the Changeling: The Dreaming second-edition core rulebook, but had been excluded due to space concerns; some material was also reprinted from previous World of Darkness books due to usefulness to new players. "Capture the Flag" was designed to be useful to many different player configurations and to be insertable into many different types of campaigns, aiming to make both role-playing and use of force valid strategies; both experienced and inexperienced characters logical parts of the scenario; and the setting universal enough to take place in almost any city. It was written as an investigation-heavy story with a lot of intrigue, where players are forced to choose between intimidation and persuasion, and between loyalty and honor or personal gain.

The supplement was published by White Wolf Publishing in September 1997, as a 60-page softcover book. It has since also been released as an e-book, and saw a Spanish release in February 1999. A four-panel storyteller screen was bundled together with the book.

== Reception ==
Reception
Review scores
Source	Rating
Dosdediez	4/5 stars

The book was critically well received, with Dosdediez recommending it to everyone who likes Changeling: The Dreaming. Although finding the screen visually appealing, Dragon was critical of the very concept of commercially released screens, describing them as "slabs of cardboard" that players could make themselves with little effort, but appreciated the added value of having it released together with a sourcebook; Dosdediez found the screen useful, however, appreciating it for the tables and rules information printed on it for storytellers to reference while running campaigns.

Critics enjoyed the adventure "Capture the Flag", frequently describing it as intense; Dosdediez called it "magnificent", and considered it a good way to quickly introduce players to the game's setting. The expanded rules for cantrips and combat were also well received, as were the descriptions of Sidhe houses, the coverage of supernatural beings from other World of Darkness games for aiding cross-over play, and the tips on how to expand and improve one's campaigns.
