= Players Guide for Changeling: The Dreaming =

Players Guide for Changeling: The Dreaming is a 1996 role-playing game supplement published by White Wolf Publishing for Changeling: The Dreaming.

== Contents ==
Players Guide for Changeling: The Dreaming is a supplement in which new material is offered including character creation options—such as merits, flaws, legacies, and abilities, and includes an errata section for the Autumn People. The guide features a deep expansion on the nine core kith, shedding light on their histories and motivations. Redcaps, often dismissed as brutish troublemakers, are recontextualized as once-powerful rulers of the fae during the Dark Ages, forced underground by the Sidhe, but now biding their time for a resurgence in the looming winter. The guide includes an addition which centers on the Nunnehi, Native American faerie spirits. Thirteen Nunnehi families are introduced, each connected to tribal regions across the U.S. Their brand of glamour, called 'medicine,' is drawn from untouched natural environments, and they maintain spiritual ties through totems. These beings range from diminutive cave dwellers like the May-maygwya-shi to forest spirits and the formidable Numuzo'ho—giant enforcers of nature's vengeance.

== Reception ==
Lucya Szachnowski reviewed Players Guide for Changeling: The Dreaming for Arcane magazine, rating it a 7 out of 10 overall, and stated that "The artwork is colourful and attractive, the writing style is evocative and includes a short faerie story at the beginning. The supplement contains a lot of well-written, useful material. If you were originally put off Changeling because of its skimpy background, or because you didn't want to spend [the money] on cards, this might make you reconsider."
