= Nobles: The Shining Host =

Tabletop role-playing game (1996)

- Cover art by Tony DiTerlizzi
- Designers: Ian Lemke
- Illustrators: Tony DiTerlizzi, David Fooden, Rebecca Guay, Andrew Mitchell Kudelka, Brian LeBlanc, Brian O'Connell, Richard Thomas, and Drew Tucker
- Writers: Christian Howard
- Publishers: White Wolf Publishing
- Publication: March 1996
- Genres: Tabletop role-playing game supplement
- Systems: Storyteller System
- Parent games: Changeling: The Dreaming
- Series: World of Darkness
- ISBN: 1-56504-711-7

Nobles: The Shining Host is a tabletop role-playing game supplement released by White Wolf Publishing in March 1996 for use with their game Changeling: The Dreaming, and is part of the larger World of Darkness series. The book primarily describes the sidhe and other fae nobility, covering their history and giving more depth to the creation of sidhe characters, as well as fae politics in the setting.

The book was developed by Ian Lemke and written by Christian Howard, with themes of alienation and hope, and with art direction by Aileen Miles and Lawrence Snelly. Tony DiTerlizzi drew the cover art, depicting a sidhe, and took inspiration from the lyrics to Meg Davis's song "The Elf Glade". The book was well received by critics for its writing, artwork, and usefulness as a game aid, and described as an example of the publisher at its best and as one of the most essential Changeling: The Dreaming books. In 1999, it was followed by The Fool's Luck: The Way of the Commoner, a sourcebook about changeling commoners.

== Overview ==
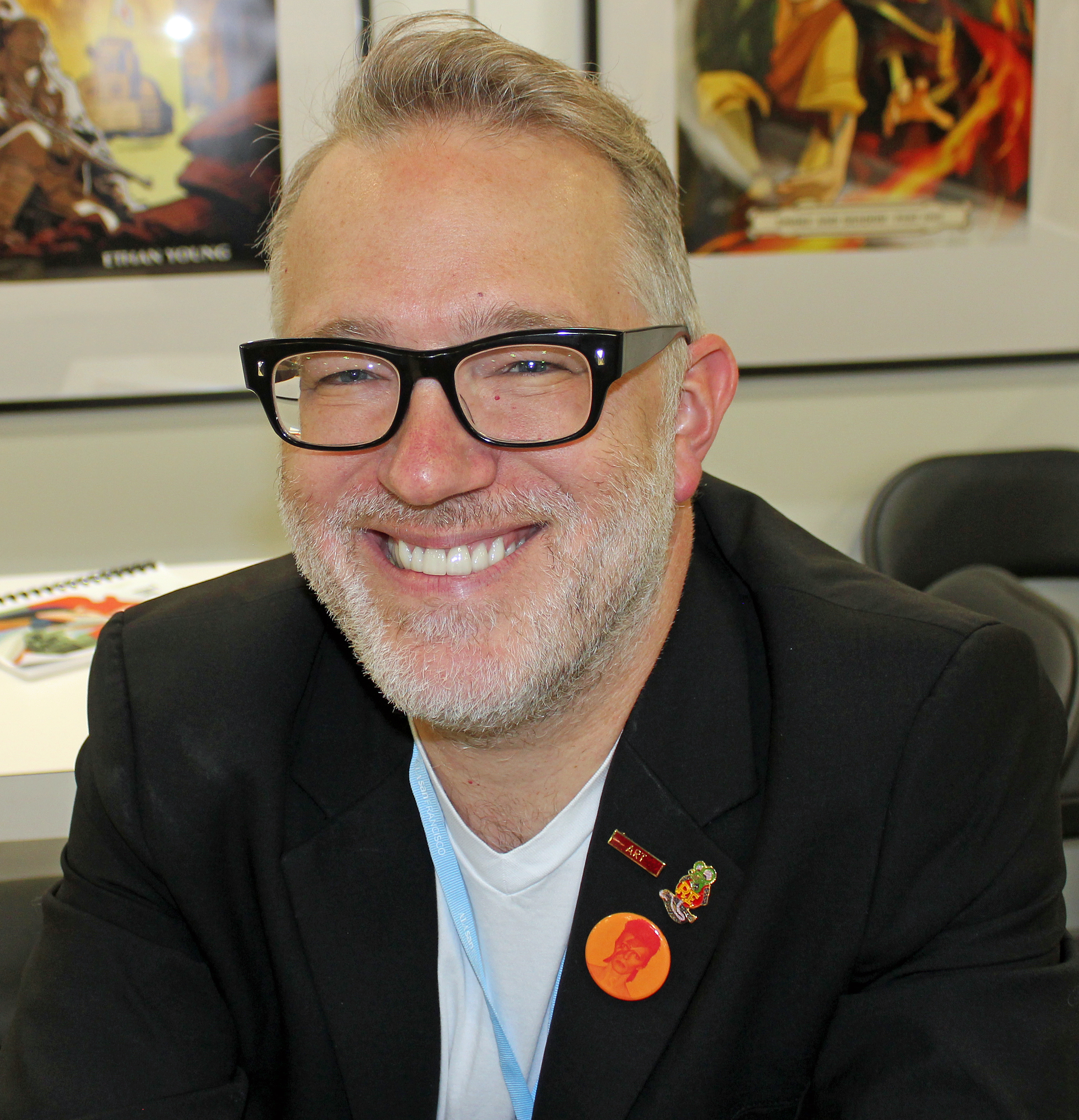
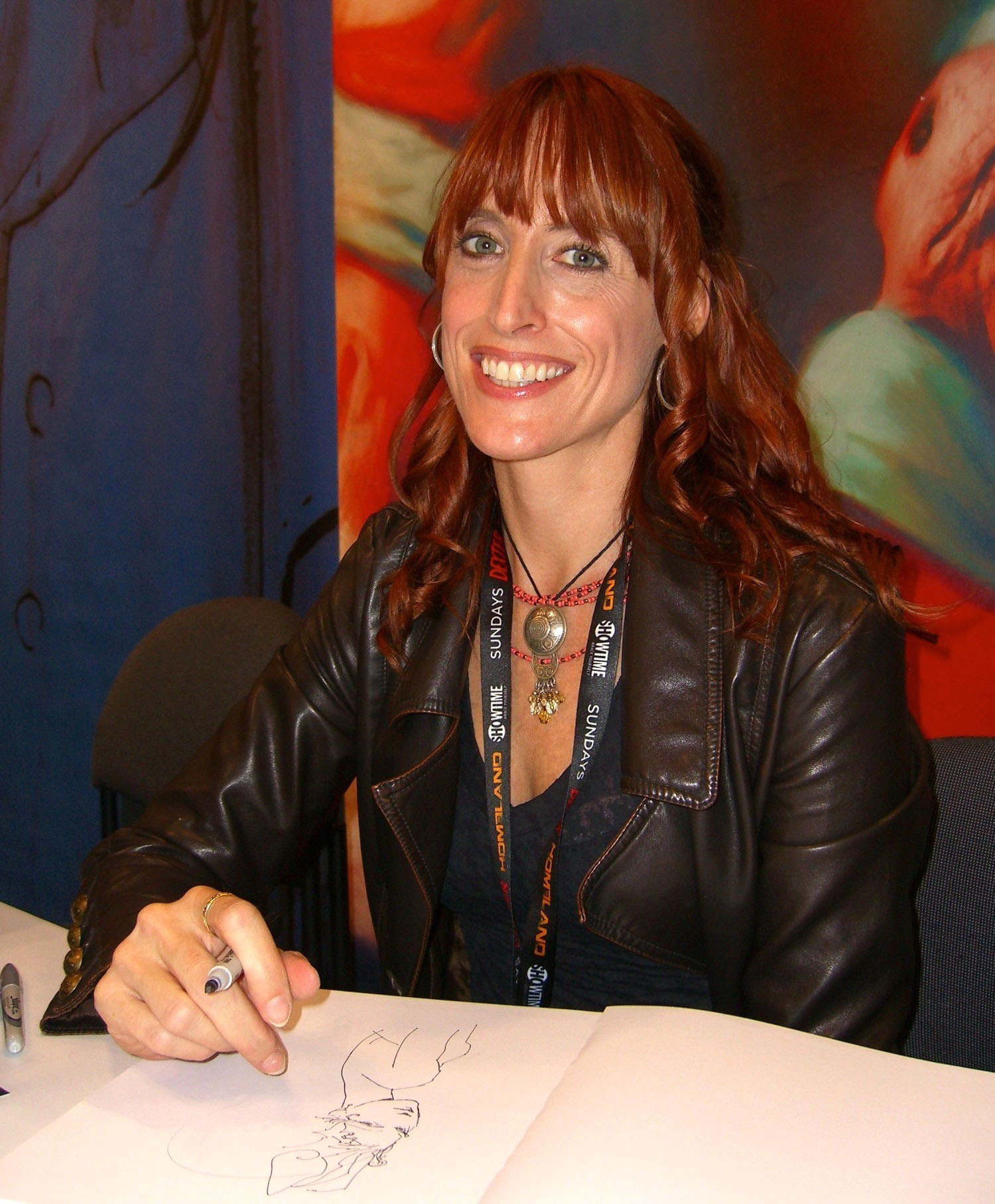
Tony DiTerlizzi and Rebecca Guay were two of the artists who provided illustrations for Nobles: The Shining Host.

Nobles: The Shining Host is a sourcebook intended to be used with the tabletop role-playing game Changeling: The Dreaming, where players take the roles of changelings. Following a short story about the legendary sidhe hero Duke Asterlan, it mainly covers the sidhe and other fae nobility, describing their history from mythical times, through their exile, and until their return in modern times. It also covers romance and fae politics, discussing nobles' rights and duties, and fae courts, houses, and secret societies.

The book additionally gives an overview of creating sidhe characters, with deeper rules than those in the Changeling: The Dreaming core rulebook, along with blank character sheets and various example characters, and adds new backgrounds and arts for characters, including Dream-Craft (manipulation of the Dreaming (Note: In the Changeling: The Dreaming setting, the Dreaming is a magical realm overlapping the real world.)) and Chronos (manipulation of time). The last portion of the book is primarily directed toward storytellers, (Note: The person leading the game is called the "storyteller" in World of Darkness games, a role called "gamemaster" or "dungeon master" in other role-playing games.) and discusses secrets and intrigues related to the sidhe that they may include in their campaigns.

== Production and release ==
Come with me
for I will take ye
Dancing now
with all my brothers
I am real,
and like the others!

— Meg Davis, "The Elf Glade". This quote inspired the cover art, and was printed as part of it.

Nobles: The Shining Host was developed by Ian Lemke and written by Christian Howard. It was designed with themes of alienation, with the sidhe portrayed as anachronistic strangers from a world of fairy tales dealing with loss of identity. Another major theme is hope, portrayed through sidhe representing inner strength and survival.

The art directors for the book were Aileen Miles and Lawrence Snelly; the art team also included interior artists David Fooden, Rebecca Guay, Andrew Mitchell Kudelka, Brian LeBlanc, Brian O'Connell, Richard Thomas, and Drew Tucker, and the cover artist Tony DiTerlizzi. DiTerlizzi drew the cover art in 1995, depicting a sidhe noble, using pen, ink, and watercolor, and it was first printed within the Changeling: The Dreaming core rulebook. White Wolf Publishing's request for the art was not specific, resulting in what DiTerlizzi described as work that felt playful and free; the song lyrics printed on the cover, quoted from Meg Davis's "The Elf Glade", were provided to DiTerlizzi by the Changeling: The Dreaming game design team to serve as inspiration for the piece.

The book was released by White Wolf Publishing in March 1996, after a delay from November 1995, as a 120-page, full-color softcover book. It has since then also been published as an ebook. A Spanish edition, which was printed in grayscale, followed in January 2002. The Fool's Luck: The Way of the Commoner, a follow-up sourcebook about changeling commoners, was released in February 1999.

== Reception ==
Reception
Review scores
Source	Rating
Arcane	8/10
Dosdediez	4/5 stars

Nobles: The Shining Host was well received by critics: Arcane called it an example of White Wolf Publishing at its best, Casus Belli described it as the by far best and most interesting of the Changeling: The Dreaming books as of 1996, and Dosdediez considered it an essential book for Changeling: The Dreaming players.

Critics liked the writing, with Arcane calling it evocative, more stylish and atmospheric than the Changeling: The Dreaming core rulebook, and more informative than Vampire: The Masquerade's Clanbook line of supplements. They found it useful, with a lot of material serving to inspire scenario creation, detailed information on the setting and on social and political fae groups, excellently written antagonists, and appealing new abilities and arts, particularly the Chronos art. Casus Belli and Dosdediez both found Nobles to be an excellent sourcebook for sidhes; Casus Belli appreciated its coverage of their past and present, and the hints at their future, and Dosdediez found that it succeeds in drawing attention to the sidhes in a way that the core rulebook does not, and makes them very appealing characters to play as. Arcane did criticize the book's scope in that it, like other Changeling: The Dreaming books released until then, only covers North America: they found that coverage highly useful for campaigns set there, but less so for campaigns set in other parts of the world. They additionally criticized the decision to forego an index and to instead just use an "inadequate" contents page.

The book's artwork was highly regarded: Arcane called it "lovely", highlighting the coloring, whereas Dosdediez, calling the illustrations "beautiful", wished that the Spanish edition had not been in grayscale. Retrospectively, Bleeding Cool described DiTerlizzi's cover as "incredible fantasy art".
