= Noblesse Oblige: The Book of Houses =

Noblesse Oblige: The Book of Houses is a 1998 role-playing game adventure published by White Wolf Publishing for Changeling: The Dreaming.

== Contents ==
Noblesse Oblige is a supplement which details the five noble houses.

== Reviews ==
- InQuest Gamer #36
- Backstab #9 (May-Jun 1998) p. 44-45
- Dragão Brasil #37 (Apr 1998) p. 4
- RPG Magazine #8 (Jul 2003) p. 6
- Shadis #46 p. 100
- Dosdediez V2 #25 (Jul 2003) p. 20
