= Kithbook: Sluagh =

Role-playing game supplement

Kithbook: Sluagh is a 1997 role-playing game supplement published by White Wolf Publishing for Changeling: The Dreaming.

== Contents ==
Kithbook: Sluagh is a supplement in which the Sluagh kith is presented as nuanced figures—spies, assassins, couriers, and seekers of truth—with a hidden sense of honor and propriety. The book explores their historical significance, their secretive activities, and their philosophical views on the future and creation. Structured like other Changeling titles, it opens with a narrative, then delves into fae history, inter-kith dynamics, notable personalities, character templates, new traits, treasures, and ends with a custom character sheet.

== Reception ==
Lucya Szachnowski reviewed Kithbook: Sluagh for Arcane magazine, rating it an 8 out of 10 overall, and stated that "Kithbook: Sluagh is a superb supplement with plenty of new material to inspire original characters and scenarios. The only thing that lets it down is the typical slightly high price of White Wolf products. The book is slim, with quite a lot of white space and large areas taken up with pictures, but the information is well worth reading and is essential if there are any sluagh in your game."

Changeling the Podcast said Kithbook: Sluagh was their favorite kithbook, although they disliked the in-character theory advanced by a sluagh scholar in the book. According to that theory, fae souls degenerate through multiple reincarnations, starting as fae and devolving through the other kiths, until they end up sluagh. After this they apparently become wraiths, explaining their connection to the dead.

== Reviews ==
- Fractal Spectrum (Issue 16 - Summer 1997)
- Dosdediez V2 #16 Nov 2000) p. 20
