= Kithbook: Trolls =

Kithbook: Trolls is a 1996 role-playing game supplement published by White Wolf Publishing for Changeling: The Dreaming.

== Contents ==
Kithbook: Trolls is a supplement in which stories of honor, duty, and love are woven alongside material that expands on Troll history, culture, and societal roles. While Trolls are often portrayed as stoic warriors loyal to their oaths, this kithbook reveals their inner complexities—torn between duty and buried emotion. It introduces multiple ideological stances Trolls might take in the intricacies of fae politics, opening possibilities beyond their stereotypical role as Sidhe bodyguards. The sourcebook provides new character options, including flaws, merits, treasures, weapons, and templates.

== Reception ==
Lucya Szachnowski reviewed Kithbook: Trolls for Arcane magazine, rating it a 7 out of 10 overall, and stated that "The artwork, as usual, is of a high standard with full colour illustrations and bright borders. On some pages, however, the type has been reduced to an unpleasantly small size in order to cram in as much information as possible. Nevertheless, having too much information is better than having a minuscule amount blown up to the type size of a five year-old's story book - one of White Wolf's common problems."

== Reviews ==
- Ringbote (Issue 13 - Jul/Aug 1997)
