= Dark Ages: Fae =

- Dark Ages: Fae cover
- Designers: Aaron Dembski-Bowden, Carrie Ann Lewis, Forrest B. Marchinton, Deena McKinney, Krister M. Michl, Matthew J. Rourke, Malcolm Sheppard
- Publishers: White Wolf
- Publication: May 2004
- Systems: Storyteller System

Dark Ages: Fae (ISBN 1588462927) is part of a series of role-playing games, re-envisioning the popular White Wolf titles in the medieval past; it is the precursor to Changeling: The Dreaming. Dark Ages: Vampire contains the basic rules for all games of the Dark Ages-line and is necessary to play them.

The book, like Changeling, uses faerie myth and folklore, particularly that of Ireland, as its source material, but reworks it into a whole world for players to inhabit.

== Setting ==
The fae of this world believe that they woke from the formless mists before humanity, and as such are and have always been the rulers of the world.

Differences between the fae began to develop early. There are three types in the game: the firstborn, sprung full-grown from the Mists; the inanimae, who formed from the interaction of the mists with the natural world (who resemble elemental nature spirits); and changelings, who may be either human children raised in faerie, or fae children raised by humans.

They are further divided by courts, which are their basic philosophies which guide their reactions to the world around them. The Spring Court is a fractious gathering that values change as an ideal in itself; the Summer Court holds traditionalists with high values of honor and precedent; the Autumn Court is most interested in learning and study of the world around them, particularly, in these days, humans; and the Winter Court is a loose alliance of monsters and bugbears, creatures that "go bump in the night," and prey on the weak. Solstice Court fae either failed to be accepted into one of the other courts or rejected them, and hold a variety of viewpoints.

When these conflicting points of view arose among the fae, it inevitably led to war. Not desiring to destroy the world, they distanced themselves from it to fight their battles, leaving it (temporarily) in human hands. Humans swore Oaths of Gold to them, to hold the lead and act as stewards. After many long years of battle, a truce was declared, and the fae have come back for their lands.

But humans have forgotten their oaths, and are not interested in giving the world back. They have changed and solidified it, and they have gained powerful weapons in faith and religion to drive away the fae and keep these lands. These are called Echoes, and they may take the form of any of the traditional prescriptions against faeries: bells, clothes worn inside out, iron, crosses, etc.

The fae themselves have mostly forgotten how to make oaths of great power, and are generally reduced to smaller vows with one human or with a small group of them, which serve mainly to protect them against Echoes. Oaths consist of a service or prohibition on the part of the human, a service on the part of the faerie, and a penalty for breaking of terms. Traditional "placating" measures of folklore are the basic inspiration for oaths: leaving cream or bread out and staying out of certain forests are examples. Trangressions by either party are punished harshly.

Fae reactions to this state of things vary; there are semi-political groups favoring, variously, a return to war at the end of the truce, an extension of the truce, a return to a cyclical sharing of power, and study of humans and human powers. These may take into consideration human affairs and their gaining power or ignore them in favor of "more important" issues.

== Nature of the Fae ==
Unlike in Changeling, the faerie and human worlds are not separate. Human lands are more precise in location, more concrete and settled, but pathways exist to faerie lands that anyone may follow. Also unlike Changeling, there are no kiths. No two fae are so much alike that they personify the same dream in the human psyche, and the idea of fae as reliant on humans for their existence is virtually unknown. There are therefore no standard powers and benefits of dice rolls for any type of fae.

While changelings and inanimae have two faces, one that shows a human side and one that shows them for the creatures they are, the firstborn must rely on the Mists to shield them. Whatever type the fae is, their natural appearance is inhuman in subtle ways... hair, skin, or eye color, features of elements or animals, unusual stature, and other "exotic" touches. These subtle differences are called Lesser Features, and have no mechanical gameplay effect. Greater Features are more obvious (horns; great or very small stature; an entrancing, otherworldly gaze), and do give gameplay benefits. However, they make a fae more susceptible to Echoes.

Fae are brought into faerie society (whatever their origin) first through a Fosterage, as they are cared for in "youth"—which may or may not be similar to childhood—and secondly and most importantly through a Saining, which is a ritual in which a fae chooses and is accepted into a Court.

== Faerie glamour ==
The magic the fae use is divided into categories that correspond roughly to the courts; each Court favors one Dominion, and gains benefits for using that one, but may also have any of the others. The four Dominions are Dawn, Day, Dusk, and Night; they are essentially groups of correspondences—for instance, Night, favored by the Winter Court, includes powers of ice, water, darkness, mind-shielding and silence, among others.

=== Spell-casting ===
There are two methods a fae can use to call on these powers; he can choose a specific ability he knows well (called a cantrip) and roll that as specified. This is called Weaving. Or, if he isn't looking for a particular effect or if he wishes to draw on an aspect he is not as familiar with, he may Unleash—call upon the pure possibility of the Mists. This may have the effect he wants, may be unexpectedly powerful, or may backfire, depending on the roll of the dice. The system is somewhat similar to Mage: The Ascension and Dark Ages: Mage.

== Publication history ==
Shannon Appelcline noted that in 2002, "White Wolf returned to historical RPGs. First, they published the one-off Victorian Age Vampire (2002). More notably, they re-launched their only truly successful historical line from the years of 1995-1999. Dark Ages: Vampire (2002) was published as a core rulebook. Supplements then appeared for other magical groups, each dependent upon Dark Ages: Vampire to play. Over the new few years, all of the surviving World of Darkness games got Dark Ages attention in this way, resulting in Darg Ages: Mage (2002), Dark Ages: Inquisitor (2002), Dark Ages: Werewolf (2003) and Dark Ages: Fae (2004)."

== Reviews ==
- Backstab #49
- Casus Belli Vol. 2 #27
- The Silven Trumpeter (Issue 12 - Jul 2004)
