= Isle of the Mighty =

Isle of the Mighty is a 1997 role-playing game supplement published by White Wolf Publishing for Changeling: The Dreaming.

== Contents ==
Isle of the Mighty is a supplement in which the focus is on the British Isles, with some crossover relevance for Mage: The Ascension. The game's original premise is that faerie magic had largely faded from Europe and found new life in America. The book presents England, Scotland, and Wales (Albion, Caledonia, and Cymru) through immersive in-character narratives, letters, and lectures. The supplement adapts regional legends into story seeds and introduces a new kith, the Gillhe Dhu, inspired by the folkloric green man.

== Reception ==
Lucya Szachnowski reviewed Isle of the Mighty for Arcane magazine, rating it a 7 out of 10 overall, and stated that "The adage 'Americans think 100 years is a long time, the British think 100 miles is a long way...' basically sums up the problems British Changeling storytellers will have with this supplement. There is a lot of good stuff in Isle of the Mighty, marred only slightly by the discrepancies that are almost inevitable in a supplement on a country written by authors who do not live there."

== Reviews ==
- Casus Belli #105
- Rollespilsmagasinet Fønix (Issue 17 - June 1997)
- Fractal Spectrum (Issue 16 - Summer 1997)
- Dosdediez V2 #19 (Feb 2002) p. 18
