= Immortal Eyes =

Series of tabletop RPG supplements

- Shadows on the Hill cover art
- Type: Tabletop role-playing game supplements
- Creator: White Wolf Publishing
- Publisher: White Wolf Publishing
- First release: Immortal Eyes: The Toybox; 1995
- Latest release: Immortal Eyes: Court of All Kings; 1996
- Parent series: World of Darkness

Immortal Eyes is a series of tabletop role-playing game supplements published by White Wolf Publishing in 1995–1996 for their game Changeling: The Dreaming, consisting of The Toybox, Shadows on the Hill, and Court of All Kings.

== Contents ==
Immortal Eyes: Shadows on the Hill is a supplement for the Immortal Eyes campaign which presents detailed information on Hawaii as a game setting.

== Reception ==
Lucya Szachnowski reviewed Immortal Eyes: Shadows on the Hill for Arcane magazine, rating it a 7 out of 10 overall. Szachnowski comments that "Immortal Eyes: Shadows on the Hill is really only of passing interest for non-Changeling gamers, and the scenarios will only be of limited value to those who haven't got The Toybox. Nevertheless, it makes an excellent continuation of the Immortal Eyes campaign and is good value for money."

== Reviews ==
- Shadis #24 (February 1996) - Immortal Eyes: The Toybox
- Envoyer #31 (Die Augen der Unsterblichkeit)
- Envoyer #34 (Schatten über den Hügeln)
