= Subject Seven =

2011 novel by James A. Moore

- Cover
- Author: James A. Moore
- Cover artist: Tony Sahara
- Language: English
- Series: Subject Seven Series
- Genre: Young adult
- Publisher: Penguin Group
- Publication date: January 2011
- Publication place: United States
- Media type: Print (hardcover)
- Pages: 327 pp (first edition)
- ISBN: 978-1-59514-304-4

Subject Seven is a young-adult novel by the American writer James A. Moore, first published in 2011 by Penguin.

== Plot ==
The novel begins with Subject Seven in the compound containment room. Subject Seven doesn't like being there as a test subject, so he escapes the compound. Afterwards, Subject Seven goes to the city to live on his own. While living in different cities, he learns to steal and kill to get what he wants.

Hunter Harrison wakes up and doesn't know where he is or who he is, but there is a tape telling him that he will get all of the answers he want as long as he listens to his kidnapper, Subject Seven. Meanwhile, Subject Seven pays Clarkson for information on the other subjects. After he knocks Hunter out again, Subject Seven gives him the task of finding all of the other subjects. As a result of Hunter completing the task, Subject Seven goes out to finds them and knock them out. When the characters, Gene, Tina, Cody, and Kyrie, wake up, they do not know where they are, but they do know who they are. They all wake up in different places and they all try to go back to their homes'. Subject Seven finds all of them and knocks them out again.

Subject Seven gathers them up and tells them that they were test subjects for the military. After he lets them take in what he said, he tells them that they have alter egos that they can change into. These alter egos are faster stronger and smarter, and when they are in them they don't remember anything. At first they all have Subject Seven and want to go back home, but once Subject Seven tells them what the military did to them, they all change their minds. Although they used to hate each other, they become good friends and start to learn about each other.

Meanwhile, Evelyn Hope is coming up with a plan to capture Subject Seven and the others. She then finally decides to send soldiers to capture them and take them back to the compound. Soldiers came to the hotel room that they were staying at and tried to take them back to the compound. the subjects changed into their alter egos and started to fight the soldiers. the subjects killed all of the soldiers and realized that their testers really wanted them back. The subjects are now very hype, ready to kill, and full of anger. With all of that they decide to kill their testers.

== Background ==
Subject Seven is James A. Moore's first young adult novel. During an interview with YA Book Reads, James was asked “Where did you get the idea for it.” James answered with “ I was doing a long distance drive and listening to Disturbed (band) when one of the songs got stuck in my head. The more I listened to the CD, the more I started liking the idea of a sort of “Jekyll and Hyde” scenario with military implications. And after a few hours, I started thinking it would be a lot of fun to mess with character suffering from that sort of condition."

== Reception ==
Jane Henriksen states that “the theme of this story isn't new,” but, “this updated version is uniquely appealing to teens.” Publishers Weekly says “he nicely juggles the Jekyll and Hyde aspects of his characters,” and John Peters added that "Dr. Jekyll and Mr. Hyde meet The Incredible Hulk," in this novel. Publishers Weekly complemented it by calling it a "grisly mix of conspiracy novel and body horror fiction,” but says that there are, “usual plot holes associated with this type of genre.” John noted that "readers patient enough to weather each team members protracted introduction will be rewarded.” With “underlying themes,” and its “violent and visceral storytelling," Jane added.
