= Toccoa Falls =

Waterfall on Toccoa Creek in Stephens County, Georgia, USA

Coordinates: 34°35′46″N 83°21′36″W

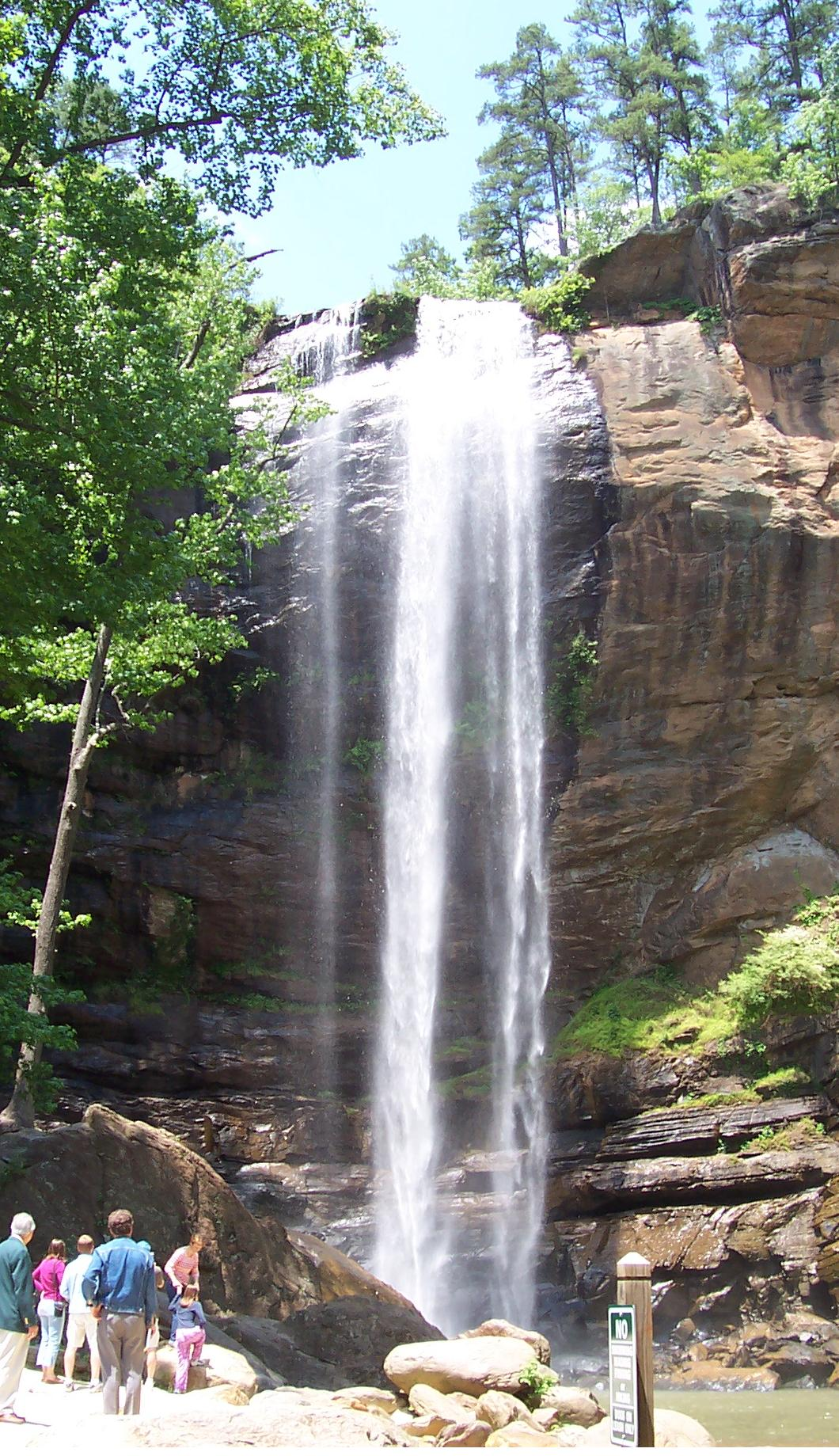

Toccoa Falls is a waterfall on Toccoa Creek with a vertical drop of 186 feet (57 m) on the campus of the University of Toccoa Falls in Stephens County, Georgia, United States. Toccoa comes from the Cherokee word "Tagwâ′hĭ", meaning "Catawba place" or "beautiful".

== Legend ==
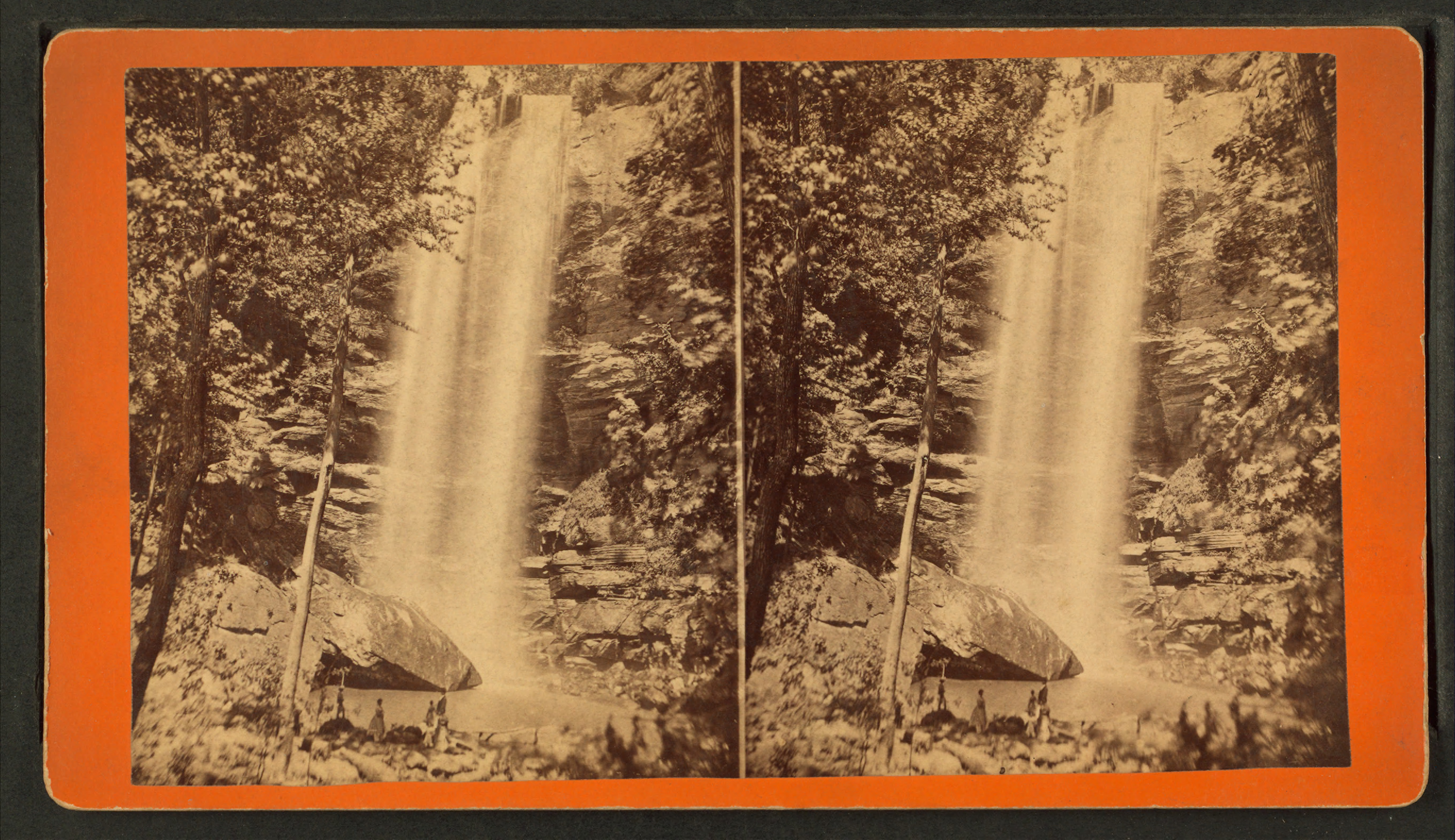
Stereoscopic view of Toccoa Falls by J. A. Palmer, 1870

The land around Toccoa Falls was traded to White settlers in 1783, and written accounts of the falls began to appear in publications in the nineteenth century. White folk tales about Toccoa Falls are recounted in the writings of Elizabeth F. Ellet and Charles Montgomery Skinner. Both Ellet's and Skinner's stories portray tension between the White settlers and the Native Americans of the area, describing the White settlers as victims of the Native Americans' violence. The stories, which Ellet and Skinner both independently suggest are apocryphal, involve a theme of White women tricking groups of men to walk off of Toccoa Falls, although the men are Native American in Skinner's story; however, in Ellet's account, the White woman has been forced by Native Americans to trick her fellow White settlers.

In the 1890s, ethnographer James Mooney compiled myths of the Cherokee while living with them for several years. Mooney recounts a story about Toccoa Falls told to him by his half-Cherokee assistant in which, when the White newcomers saw Toccoa Falls for the first time, they saw a Cherokee woman walking underneath the water who then suddenly appeared on top of the falls after a moment. Mooney's assistant says that the woman in the story "must have been one of the Nûñnë'hï," a race of spirit people in Cherokee mythology.

== Dam break ==
During the early morning hours of November 6, 1977, after five days of almost continual rain, the dam that impounded the waters of Kelly Barnes Lake (located above the Toccoa Falls College campus) burst, and 176 million gallons of water surged through the campus below in the space of a few minutes. Most of the college personnel who lived in the path of the flood were asleep at the time, and 39 of them were swept to their deaths in the raging waters of Toccoa Creek. The dam was not rebuilt.

== See also ==
- List of waterfalls
