= Land of Eight Million Dreams =

1998 TRPG supplement

- Cover art by Tony DiTerlizzi
- Designers: Ian Lemke
- Illustrators: Theodor Black, Tony DiTerlizzi, John Dollar, Steve Ellis, Michael Gaydos, Jeff Holt, Kostas Kiriakakis, Aileen Miles, James Stowe, Drew Tucker
- Writers: Deena McKinney; James A. Moore; Wayne Peacock
- Publishers: White Wolf Publishing
- Publication: December 1998
- Genres: Tabletop role-playing game supplement
- Systems: Storyteller System
- Parent games: Changeling: The Dreaming
- Series: World of Darkness
- ISBN: 1-56504-722-2

Land of Eight Million Dreams is a tabletop role-playing game supplement released by White Wolf Publishing in December 1998 for use with their game Changeling: The Dreaming, and is part of the World of Darkness series. It was developed by Ian Lemke and written by Deena McKinney, James A. Moore, and Wayne Peacock, and was released as the final entry in the Year of the Lotus line of Asia-themed World of Darkness books.

The book covers Asia as it is portrayed in the setting, and introduces Asian changelings called hsien or shinma as playable characters; unlike the changelings of the main game, who are fae bound to human bodies, the shinma are divine spirits inhabiting dying or dead humans' bodies. Taking the roles of these, players can use a free-form magic system based on the classical Chinese elements. The supplement was critically acclaimed, receiving praise for originality, its setting and characters, and its magic system, while its organization and heavy use of Chinese terminology were criticized.

== Overview ==
Land of Eight Million Dreams is a sourcebook intended to be used with the tabletop role-playing game Changeling: The Dreaming, where players take the roles of changelings. The book covers Asia – primarily China – as it is portrayed in the setting, and introduces Asian changelings known as hsien or shinma to the game. Unlike the changelings of the main game, who are fae spirits bound to human bodies for protection, the shinma are minor divine spirits inhabiting dying or dead humans' bodies while retaining few memories from their immortal souls, as the result of an ancient punishment by the August Personage of Jade.

The shinma are divided into different types, called kwannon-jin, and further split into nobles who protect nature, and commoners who answer prayers and carry out quests for the nobles. The commoners are shape-shifting animal spirits associated with cats, fish, serpents, badgers, or monkeys, whereas the nobles are elemental spirits, with abilities based on the classical Chinese elements of fire, water, earth, metal, and wood, and associated attributes. Led by a storyteller, (Note: The person leading the game is called the "storyteller" in World of Darkness games, a role called "gamemaster" or "dungeon master" in other role-playing games.) players create and role-play as these shinma characters.

As shinma, players can use wu tan – magic based on yin and yang and the elements – in a free-form magic system: rather than choosing from a list of magic spells, players describe how they want to use an element and whether the attempted action is more tilted toward yin or yang, and the storyteller determines how difficult that action should be to perform based on this. Antagonists in the setting include the shinma's ancient enemies the kuei-jin vampires; sects of mages; wraiths, including the former owners of the shinma's bodies; and the demonic servants of the Yama Kings.

In addition to the game mechanics and the descriptions of shinma and their history, Land of Eight Million Dreams also includes information meant for the storyteller, such as intrigues and plot threads that they can make use of in their campaigns.

== Production and release ==
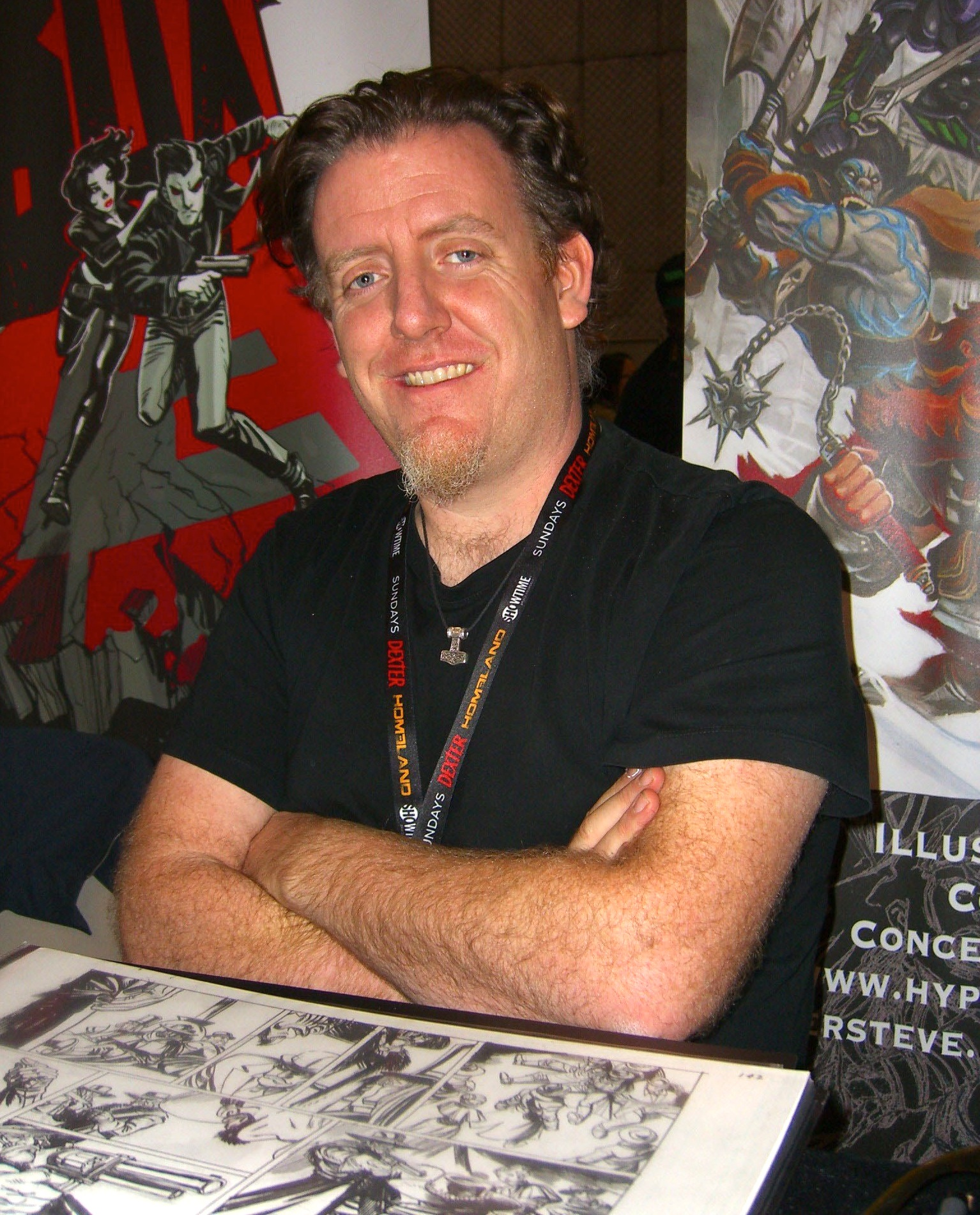
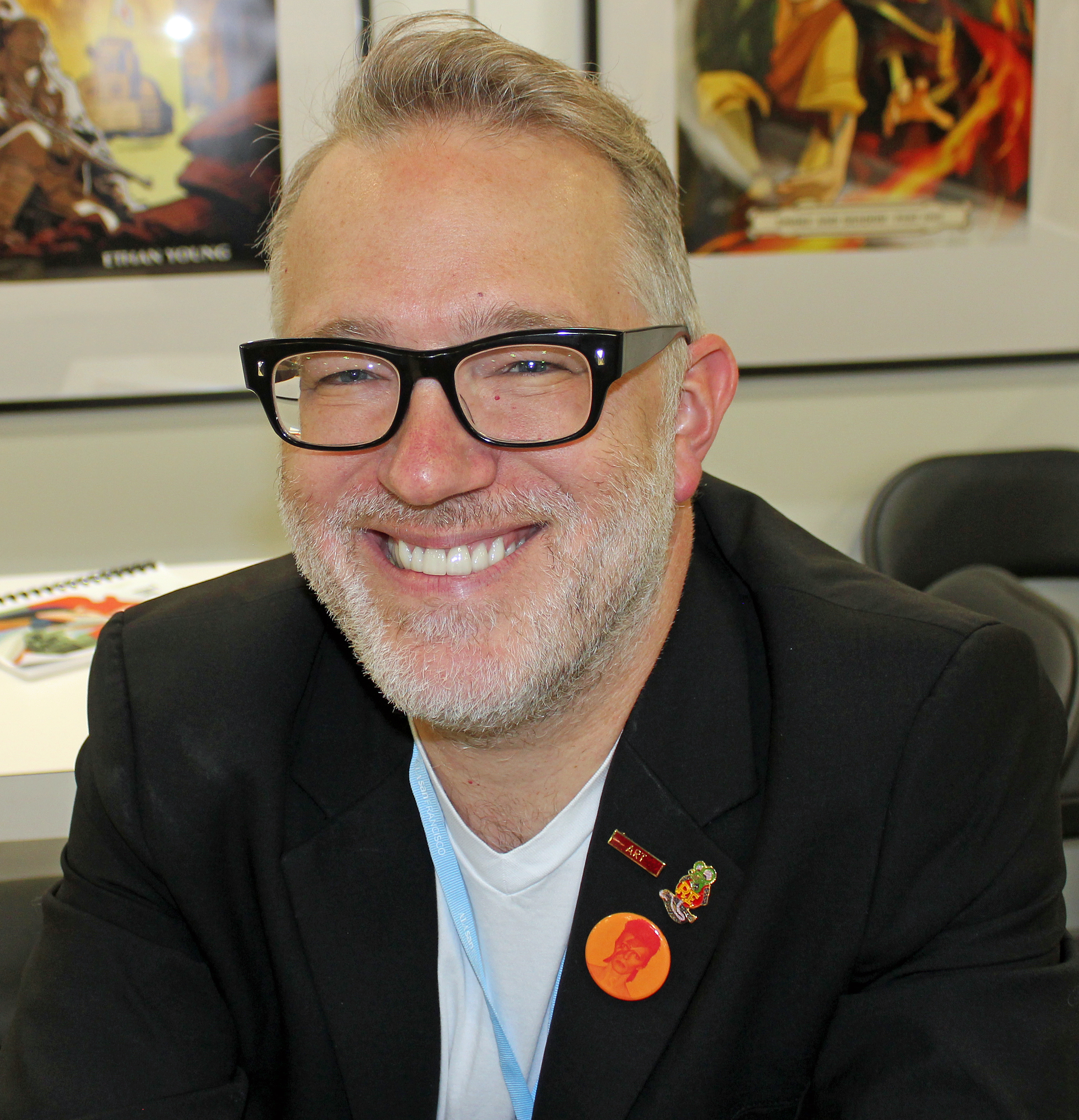
The art team included Steve Ellis and Tony DiTerlizzi.

Land of Eight Million Dreams was developed by Ian Lemke, and written by Deena McKinney, James A. Moore, and Wayne Peacock, with art direction by Aileen Miles, interior art by Theodor Black, John Dollar, Steve Ellis, Michael Gaydos, Jeff Holt, Kostas Kiriakakis, James Stowe, and Drew Tucker, and cover art by Tony DiTerlizzi. Although released as an extension of Changeling: The Dreaming, the production team conceded that the new setting and character types essentially made Land of Eight Million Dreams a different game. They designed it with a blend of mystique and whimsy, and suggested themes and moods for Land of Eight Million Dreams campaigns including mystery and intrigue, balance and order, shinma as guardians and helpers, quests, justice, and nature.

The book was the final entry in Year of the Lotus – a line of Asia-themed World of Darkness books released throughout 1998, which introduced Asian supernatural beings to the games in the series, including Hengeyokai: Shapeshifters of the East for Werewolf: The Apocalypse and Kindred of the East for Vampire: The Masquerade. It was released by White Wolf Publishing in December 1998, as a 150-page softcover book. It has also been released as an e-book, and saw a Spanish release in September 2000.

== Reception ==
Reception
Review scores
Source	Rating
Backstab	8/10
Dosdediez	3/5 stars

Land of Eight Million Dreams was critically acclaimed, described by SF Site as an impressive work with an "astonishing" level of originality and as a linchpin for the Year of the Lotus line. Dosdediez called it a "very, very good" book, and found it to hold up well compared to the previous Year of the Lotus books. Backstab found it "delightful", and thought it would in one word be best described as "excellent". SF Site and Backstab both commented on how surprisingly different it is from Changeling: The Dreaming, saying that despite surface-level similarities, Land of Eight Million Dreams is so different in its rules and execution that it feels more like a new game than just a sourcebook.

Critics liked the book's setting, with SF Site calling it "rich", detailed and interesting, and appealing to fantasy role-playing game players, with deep plotlines and intrigues for storytellers to implement into their campaigns. Dosdediez found the change in perspective "radical and refreshing", and Backstab described it as an interesting setting that draws in even those who are not already interested in Asian spirituality. They also appreciated the setting for fitting well into the one established in Kindred of the East, while developing it further. SF Site appreciated how integrated the shinma are into the setting, facing not just the same problem as the Changeling: The Dreaming fae of a world hostile to magic, but also having supernatural adversaries from other World of Darkness games including the kuei-jin of Kindred of the East.

The wu tan magic system was well received for its complexity, requiring players to think about what they want to do and how to accomplish it, with elements associated with various fields, such as fire being associated with etiquette, propriety and ethics; this drew comparisons to the magic of Mage: The Ascension, and was called well-developed but at times difficult to use. SF Site found that the magic abilities and character creation are what set the book apart, describing the character types as well-rounded and fresh, surpassing the Changeling: The Dreaming fae in quality and facilitating a lot of role-playing opportunities. They also appreciated the shinma's more physical presence compared to Changeling: The Dreaming fae – whose experiences are largely centered in the Dreaming, invisible to others – making it easier to interact with other character types, and giving the book a lot of cross-over potential with other books in the series. They did feel that the book overlooks how shinma would interact with some World of Darkness species they found potentially relevant, such as the changing breeds of Werewolf: The Apocalypse.

The book's presentation was on the one hand well received for its "extremely good art" illustrating the shinma, but on the other criticized for having at times poor organization and an overload of information, and for overusing Chinese terminology, meaning players who do not speak Chinese have to keep referencing the lexicon until having learned all the new vocabulary. SF Site commented that they thought the book could have used less specialized language without losing its flavor.
