= Dreams and Nightmares (Changeling: The Dreaming) =

Tabletop role-playing game supplement

- Cover art by Michael Gaydos
- Designers: Ian Lemke
- Illustrators: Steve Ellis, Michael Gaydos, Jeff Holt, Ryan Kelly, Matthew Mitchell, Paul S. Phillips, Steve Prescott
- Writers: Robert Scott Martin, Neil Mick, James A. Moore
- Publishers: White Wolf Publishing
- Publication: November–December 1997
- Genres: Tabletop role-playing game supplement
- Systems: Storyteller System
- Parent games: Changeling: The Dreaming
- Series: World of Darkness
- ISBN: 1-56504-718-4

Dreams and Nightmares is a tabletop role-playing game supplement released by White Wolf Publishing in November–December 1997 for their game Changeling: The Dreaming, and is part of the larger World of Darkness series. It was well received by critics.

== Overview ==
Dreams and Nightmares is a sourcebook for the tabletop role-playing game Changeling: The Dreaming, where players take the role of changelings. It describes the Dreaming.

== Production ==
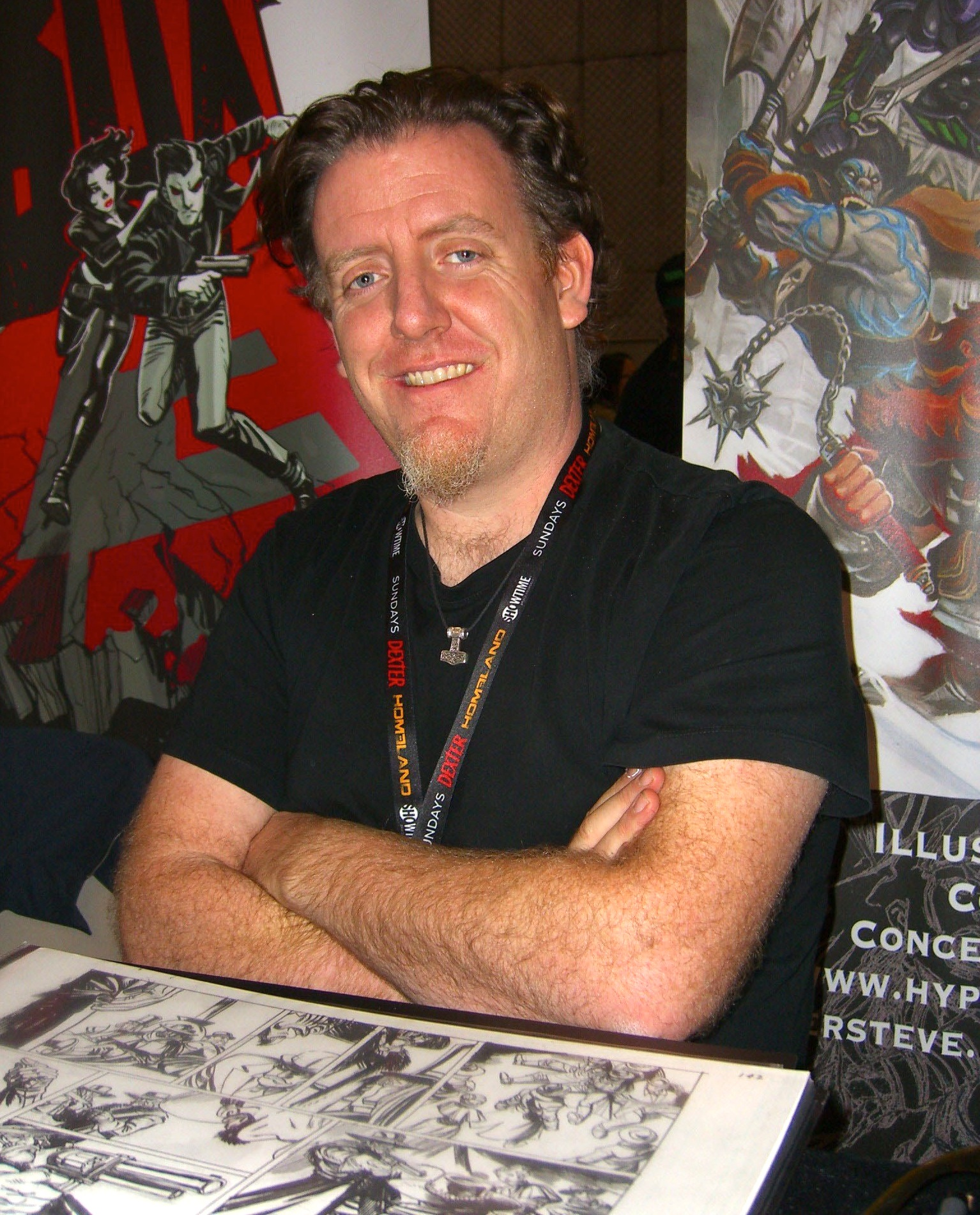
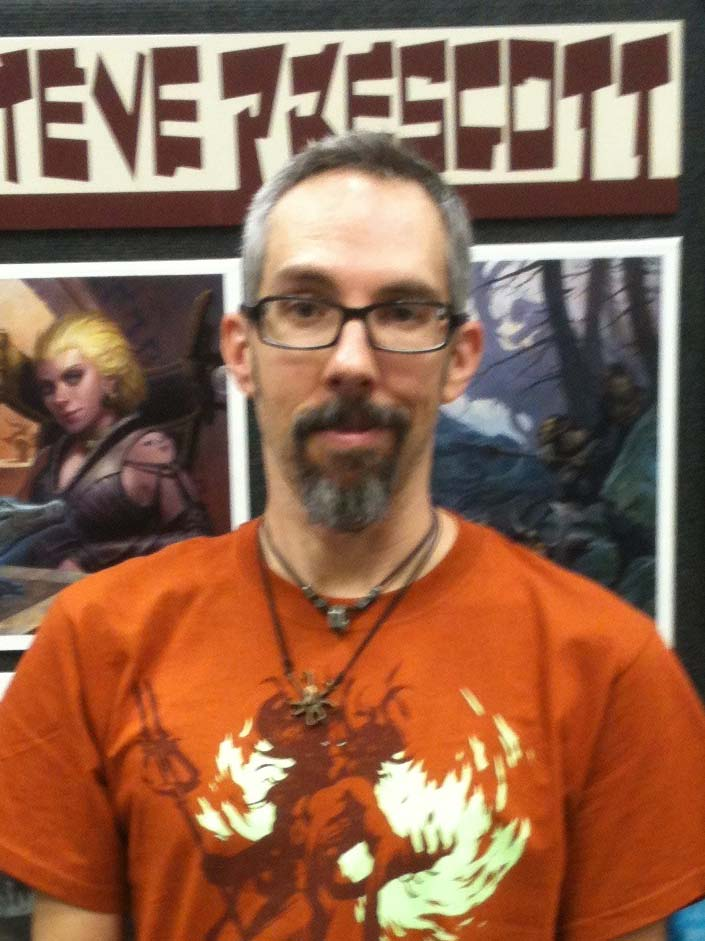
The art team included Steve Ellis and Steve Prescott.

Dreams and Nightmares was developed by Ian Lemke, and was written by Robert Scott Martin, Neil Mick, and James A. Moore, and edited by Ed Hall. The art director for the book was Aileen Miles; the art team also included interior artists Steve Ellis, Jeff Holt, Ryan Kelly, Matthew Mitchell, Paul S. Phillips, and Steve Prescott, and the cover artist Michael Gaydos.

The book was released by White Wolf Publishing in November–December 1997 as a 130-page softcover book; it has since also been released as an ebook.

== Reception ==
Reception
Review scores
Source	Rating
Backstab	9/10

Dreams and Nightmares was well received by critics. Dragon comments that "the enchanting imagination that suffuses Dreams and Nightmares gives Changeling a spirit of whimsy new to the Storyteller line." Casus Belli described it as an "absolutely essential" supplement for Changeling: The Dreaming players, calling it cute and full of funny ideas.

In a review for InQuest, Rebecca Schoenberg stated that the at times vague rules made the supplement "a bit difficult for new players to use", but that it was a "definite treasure for imaginative roleplayers".
