= Caerns: Places of Power =

Role-playing game supplement

Caerns: Places of Power is a supplement published by White Wolf Publishing in 1993 for the horror role-playing game Werewolf: The Apocalypse.

== Description ==
Caerns: Places of Power is a 160-page softcover book designed by Emrey Barnes, Steven C. Brown, Phil Brucato, Alan Bryden, Sam Chupp, John Gavigan, Harry Heckel, Christopher Howard, Sam Inabinet, Izumi Hideo, David Key, Kenneth Meyer, James A. Moore, George Neal, Roderick Robertson, Ryk Strong, and Teeuwynn Woodruff. Interior art is by John Bridges, Sam Inabinet, Scar Studios, Dan Smith, Ron Spencer, Joshua Gabriel Timbrook, and Bryon Wackwitz, with cover art by Scott Hampton.

In 1996, Hexagonal produced a French translation of the book.

== Contents ==
The book describes fourteen sites of spiritual power, called "caerns", that are sacred to each of the tribes of the Garou (werewolves). Each Caern description is written by a different author. Locales range from Tibet to Arizona, China and Ireland. Each entry has details of the history, important personalities, and points of interest.

== Reception ==
Reception
Review scores
Source	Rating
Backstab	6/10
Dragon	4/6 stars

In the May 1994 edition of Dragon (Issue 205), Rick Swan liked the details provided for each site. But he was disappointed by a lack of follow-up to seemingly good ideas: "The history of the Greek caern hints at a link between the Garou and Nazi Germany, but it’s left undeveloped... A cannibal who operates a corner grocery store in Alaska — a great idea for a character if I ever heard one — is introduced then tossed away." Swan also thought, "The story hooks, many only a sentence or two, don’t amount to much." However, he concluded, "Despite its flaws, the sheer volume of ideas makes this a great resource for new campaigns."

In the December 1996 edition of Casus Belli (Issue 100), Fabrice Colin, reviewing the French translation of the book produced by Hexagonal, expected that the listing of each Caern and its characteristics would be "a little dry". But he found because each chapter is written by a different author, "Each offers us descriptions out of the ordinary." Colin described the book as "A ride that will take you from the Himalayas to the Grand Canyon, from the plains of Russia to those of Ireland, from the temples of Kyoto to the mosques of Casablanca. It's poetic (often), tragic (sometimes) and fascinating (always), even if certain passages are sometimes a bit cliche." Referring to the poor French translations of previous World of Darkness volumes, Colin complimented Hexagonal on this book, saying the publisher "has made great progress in the choice of its translators."

In the January-February 1997 edition of Backstab (Issue #1), Thierry Rousselet felt that because each chapter was written by a different author, the quality of writing varied. "Yes for the Silent Striders of Casablanca, for example, and 'meh' for Bone Gnawers from Washington DC." Rousselet also felt the book had a very chauvinistic American slant. "Four Caerns in the United States, none in South America. Do you have something against the Amazon?" And he thought that too many pages were used to for non-player characters, space that could have been utilized to describe more Caerns. But Rousselet conceded that "On the other hand, these 'places of power' are almost ready to play and will allow the Storyteller to cook up a good package."

== Reviews ==
- Valkyrie #1 (Sept., 1994)
- Casus Belli V1 #94 (May 1996)
- Australian Realms #16
