= World of Darkness: Demon Hunter X =

1998 role-playing game supplement

World of Darkness: Demon Hunter X is a 1998 role-playing game supplement published by White Wolf Publishing for Vampire: The Masquerade.

== Contents ==
World of Darkness: Demon Hunter X is a supplement which details humans who fight vampires.

== Reviews ==
- SF Site
- Backstab #10 (Jul-Aug 1998) p. 37
- Casus Belli V1 #115 (Aug-Sep 1998) p. 22
- Dragão Brasil #30 (Sep 1997) p. 5
- Dragão Brasil #41 (Aug 1998) p. 3
- SF Site
- Magia i Miecz #2000-11 p. 15
- Dosdediez V2 #12 (Feb 2000) p. 19
