= Meg Davis =

American singer of traditional music

Meg Davis (born January 28, 1953) is an American singer of traditional music. She is also a songwriter, best known for her classic ballad "Captain Jack and the Mermaid" (recorded by many world folk groups such as De Dannan). She is known primarily as a folk musician and folklorist specializing in historical ballads as well as a composer of stories and music in the same genre as Donovan and Fairport Convention.

== Early life ==
She was born in Cincinnati, Ohio, on January 28, 1953.

== Career ==
Her solo performances throughout the festivals, concert halls (including the Town Hall in New York City and the Kennedy Center in Washington, D.C.) and cathedrals throughout the US, the UK, Ireland and at Saint Peter's Basilica in Rome, have gained her a reputation as a first-rate musician and vocalist. Davis has won the respect of her fellow Irish/American musicians for her sensitive and powerful renderings of traditional Celtic songs, and sea ballads, and for her beautiful guitar accompaniment of Scottish, Irish and Breton dance tunes. She has put these talents to use as a long-standing member of the Joe Burke Trio, whose leader is the Galway button accordionist. In addition to her regular appearances with Burke, Davis also performed and appeared on stage with such diverse musicians as Bill Monroe, Alan Stivell, Doc Watson, Pete Seeger, Ewan MacColl, and Peter Yarrow.

Davis was the winner of the Best Young North American Songwriter Award in 1978, chosen and awarded the honor by Peter Yarrow, and has five albums of original music and four albums containing traditional ballads of land and sea to her credit. In 1990, she collected and arranged a collection of Scottish, Irish and original songs, entitled The Claddagh Walk, which was produced by Donald Shaw of Capercaillie and recorded in Scotland. Of her album Captain Jack and the Mermaid, Richard Harrington, writing for The Washington Post remarked that it was "one of the most refreshing and brave new albums I've come across in a long time". In July 1991, The Washington Post said of Davis's performance of "Such a Parcel of Rogues" in the National Cathedral that "she gave a crystal clear reading in a sparkling vibrato that illuminated the whole of that sacred place".

Some of her compositions have been used in film and documentaries, several songs are in use as theme songs for television shows in the Netherlands, there have been choral renditions created by choir masters in the US and UK for children's choirs.

In 1993, Davis was forced to stop touring and performing before live audiences due to multiple sclerosis, fibromyalgia and arthritis. She continues to compose musical works and strives to return to the studio in the future.

Although many a music critic has felt that Davis must be a classically trained composer, singer and guitarist she is self-taught, learning to play the guitar at the age of 12. She began songwriting at the age of 14 and taught herself to sing listening to old recordings of Mario Lanza and Frank Sinatra on her grandmother's record player. Her primary musical instruments are acoustic and electric guitars : 1960s-vintage Martin guitars 6 and 12 string, 1984 Taylor guitars made by Robert Taylor and a 1995 Fender Telecaster. Her greatest musical influences have been Donovan, Joni Mitchell, the Beatles, Dame Kiri Te Kanawa, Benny Goodman and Jethro Tull.

== Discography ==
- Captain Jack and the Mermaid (1979)
- Dream of Light Horses (1982)
- Swing the Cat (1985)
- The Music of Wonderland (1987)
- The Claddagh Walk (1990, Lismore Records, Scotland)
- By the Sword (1991) (All original music, lyrics and arrangements by Davis based on By the Sword by Mercedes Lackey)
- Live at Dennos (1992)
- Captain Jack and the Mermaid Special Edition (2000)
- The Burning West Indies (2004)
