= Toccoa Creek =

Stream in Georgia, U.S.

Coordinates: 34.6060°N 83.3344°W

Toccoa Creek is a stream in the U.S. state of Georgia.

Toccoa Creek carries Toccoa Falls, a 186-foot (57 m) waterfall.

Toccoa comes from the Cherokee word "Tagwâ′hĭ," meaning "beautiful" or "Catawba place."

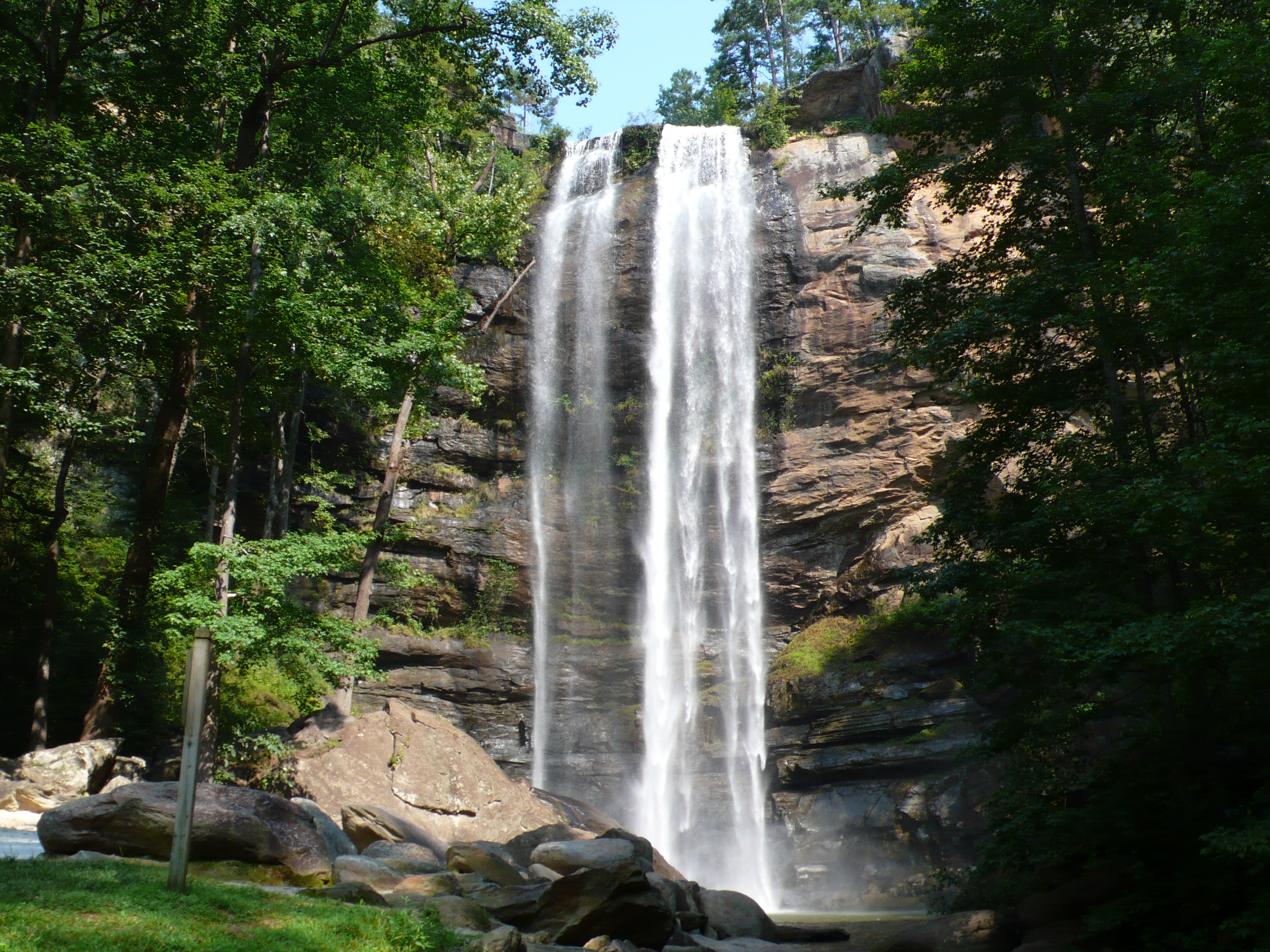
Toccoa Falls, on Toccoa Creek
