= Brian Campbell (game designer) =

American writer and game designer

Brian "Chainsaw" Campbell is a Greater Seattle area game developer, author and editor who is credited for working in the role-playing game industry as far back as 1993. Campbell's notable work includes Werewolf: The Apocalypse, Mage: The Ascension, Changeling: The Dreaming, Ratkin, and other World of Darkness products for White Wolf, the d20 versions of Call of Cthulhu and Star Wars for Wizards of the Coast, indie games such as Spaceship Zero for Green Ronin and Fading Suns for Holistic Design, Inc., and a foray into board games that included Betrayal at House on the Hill from Avalon Hill.

Campbell worked as an editor on World of Darkness supplements, including Dark Alliance: Vancouver, Caerns: Places of Power, and Umbra: The Velvet Shadow.
