= Cantrip =

Magical spell of any kind

A cantrip is a magic spell of any kind. It can also be a witch's trick, or a sham. The word "cantrip", of Scots origin, possibly comes from the Gaelic term canntaireachd, a piper's mnemonic chant. A cantrip is a term with several meanings, although primarily related to magic, tricks, and minor supernatural effects. The word and concept originated in Scotland and has been popularized in various forms of folklore, games, and modern witchcraft practices.

A Wiccan Dictionary defines a cantrip as a "magickal spell".

In Scottish folklore a cantrip could refer to a trick, a minor spell, or some sort of supernatural effect. That still holds true in today's pop culture. Today, the word cantrip is most often used when referring to Dungeons & Dragons, a tabletop role-playing game that has gained massive popularity since its release in 1978. In the context of the TTRPG, cantrips are small, usually harmless spells that can be cast without expending any spell slots, though there exists some cantrips that deal damage such as Fire Bolt. Notable cantrips include Prestidigitation, Mending, and Guidance.

This usage has since spread, influencing other fantasy games, books, and media. In trading card games like Magic: The Gathering, a cantrip is player-jargon referring to a spell that, in addition to any other effect, makes a player draw a card. Another popular example would be Harry Dresden from The Dresden Files. While the protagonist is a proficient mage, he often relies on simple acts of magic that could also be categorized as cantrips such as a small ball of light or creating a few sparks. In the deck-building game Dominion, a cantrip is any Action card that is self-replacing: it both draws one card and gives an Action used to play it.
