= Nûñnë'hï =

Race of immortal spirit people in Cherokee mythology

The Nunnehi (Cherokee: ᏅᏁᎯ (Nvnehi)) are a race of immortal spirit people in Cherokee mythology. In the Cherokee language, Nunnehi literally means "The People Who Live Anywhere", but it is often translated into English as "The People Who Live Forever", or simply "The Immortals". The Cherokee believe the Nunnehi to be a type of supernatural human being, completely distinct from ghosts and nature spirits, as well as from gods. In this sense, the Nunnehi (along with the Yunwi Tsunsdi, or "Little People" in the Cherokee language) are the Cherokee equivalent of fairies in traditional European folklore. The belief in fairy-like beings is universal among many ethnicities, including all American Indian tribes.

According to Cherokee folklore, the Nunnehi have many underground townhouses throughout the southern Appalachian Mountains, and they are particularly fond of high mountain peaks where no timber ever grow. Hunters would often hear the Nunnehi in the mountains, singing and dancing and beating drums, but when they would go toward the sound, it would shift about and suddenly seem to be coming from behind them or from some other direction, so that the person hearing the sound would never be able to find where it was coming from.

== Legends ==
=== The Dance at Nottely ===
The Nunnehi only appeared to humans when they allowed themselves to be seen. When they did appear, they looked and acted just like other Cherokee. The Nunnehi were very fond of music and dancing, as are the Cherokee. One of the stories about the Nunnehi tells about four Nunnehi women who came to a town called Nottely and danced with the young men there for hours. Nobody knew that they were Nunnehi women; everyone thought they were just women from another village or town. As the women were leaving the dance, a group of men standing outside the townhouse watched the women walk down an open trail to the Nottely River. When the women reached the river they suddenly disappeared, with no apparent hiding place. It was then that the men realized that the women were Nunnehi.

=== Yahula ===
The Nunnehi were very friendly to the Cherokee and often helped lost wanderers, especially during the winter. The Nunnehi would take the person into their warm townhouses until the person was rested and ready to return home, if the person chose to do so. A well-known story tells about a man named Yahula, who had become separated from a hunting party. His friends searched for him for a long time but eventually gave up and returned to their village, grieving for Yahula, who they believed was dead. The Nunnehi found Yahula and brought him back to their townhouse to live with them. Yahula became immortal and lived with the Nunnehi for a long time until he began to miss his friends and family. One night Yahula went back to his village to see his friends and family, and he told them what had happened. When they asked Yahula to eat dinner with them, he said he could not, for he had eaten the food of the Nunnehi and could never again eat human food. He told them he had only come back to visit and that he would soon be returning to the Nunnehi. His friends and family begged him to stay, but he refused, telling them he could not choose death with his own people over immortality with the Nunnehi. Yahula then returned to the Nunnehi, but he continued to visit the Cherokee often.

=== Protecting the Cherokee before the 1838 removal ===
The Nunnehi often warned the Cherokee of impending danger and protected them in times of need. One of the most well-known stories about the Nunnehi tells how they helped the Cherokee before the Removal in 1838, when the Cherokee were forced to leave their homeland and resettle in Oklahoma. According to the story, the Nunnehi came to a Cherokee village and told the people to pack up their belongings and to be prepared to leave in seven days to come live with the Nunnehi, for a great catastrophe was about to happen, worse than anything that had ever before happened to the Cherokee. After seven days, the Nunnehi returned for the Cherokee and led them to a large stone deep into the mountains. As the Cherokee watched, the stone rolled away, revealing an entrance into the mountain. Inside the mountain was the most beautiful place the Cherokee had ever seen, and many families rushed into the mountain without ever looking back. However, some of the people refused to enter, and instead chose to stay outside and face whatever was about to happen to them. The people who remained outside were later forced to leave their homes and resettle in Oklahoma. The people who chose to live with the Nunnehi escaped the fate of their fellow Cherokee. According to the story, it is from this group of Cherokee that the small number of modern Cherokee who still live on their native land is descended.

=== The removed townhouse ===
There are also other similar stories that tell about how the Nunnehi invited Cherokee people to come live with them in order to avoid war and misfortune. One well-known story tells about a time long before the time of the Removal, when the Nunnehi told a group of Cherokee that they would return in seven days to carry away the townhouse along with anyone inside it. The Nunnehi warned the people not to shout or make any sound as the townhouse was being carried away. On the seventh day there was a sound like thunder that grew louder and louder as it approached the village. Despite the Nunnehi's warning to the Cherokee to remain quiet, some of the people became frightened and screamed when the ground began to shake as the Nunnehi lifted the townhouse off the ground. Some of the Nunnehi were startled by the scream and dropped a part of the townhouse, which fell to the ground and became the mound at a village called Setsi. The Nunnehi steadied themselves and carried off the remaining part of the townhouse, with the people still in it, to a mountain called Lone Peak, where it was changed to solid rock and the people inside it became invisible and immortal like the Nunnehi.

=== Hiwassee River ===
In another story, the Nunnehi invited a group of Cherokee to come live with them, and after the seven days had passed, they returned and took the people to live with them underneath Hiwassee River, near the area where Shooting Creek comes in. The Cherokee who went to live with the Nunnehi under the river would sometimes catch the fish-drags of their kinsmen because they did not want to be forgotten. On warm summer days, when the wind ripples the surface of the water, their voices could sometimes be heard by those floating by on the river.

=== Warriors of Nikwasi ===
The Nunnehi sometimes assisted the Cherokee in times of war. One of the most well-known stories about the Nunnehi tells about how they fought alongside the Cherokee when their land was invaded by a powerful, unknown tribe of Native Americans from the southeast. Nikwasi was the most ancient settlement of the Cherokee, and the invading tribe attacked Nikwasi one morning just before daybreak. The warriors of Nikwasi fought back but were eventually overpowered. A stranger then appeared and told the Nikwasi chief to retreat and that he himself would fight the enemy. The chief did as he was instructed, believing the stranger to be a chief from another village who had come with reinforcements. The mound at Nikwasi then opened up and hundreds of Nunnehi warriors poured out and began to approach the battlefield. When the Nunnehi warriors reached the invading tribe they became invisible and slaughtered all but a few who had surrendered and begged for mercy. The Nunnehi told the invading tribe that they got what they deserved for attacking a peaceful tribe, and then sent them back to where they came from so they could deliver the news to their people and warn them to never again attack Nikwasi.

=== Defense of Franklin, North Carolina ===
During the American Civil War, by which time Nikwasi had become known as Franklin, North Carolina, a group of Union soldiers approached Franklin with the intention of burning it to the ground. A group of scouts returned to their commanding officers and warned them not to attack the town because it was heavily guarded by soldiers on every corner. However, the town was defenseless, as every able-bodied person had already left to fight in the war. Unaware of this fact, the Union soldiers then changed their course toward Atlanta, Georgia, burning every town in their path. According to the Cherokee, it was the Nunnehi that had protected Franklin from the Union soldiers.

=== The abandoned Nunnehi townhouse ===
There is a story that tells about how some of the Nunnehi eventually decided to leave their home. Near the Cherokee town of Tugaloo there was a circular depression in the ground, the size of a townhouse. The inside of the depression was waist-deep and was always clean as though it had been cared for by unknown hands. Travelers passing by would often throw rocks and logs into the depression, but when they returned the logs and rocks would always be lying far from the depression. The Cherokee believed the place to be a Nunnehi townhouse, and so they always avoided the place out of respect. Eventually, some logs had been thrown into the depression and were allowed to remain there, and the Cherokee concluded that the Nunnehi had become annoyed by the presence of the white men and had abandoned their townhouse forever.

=== In folklore after the Cherokee removal ===
After the Removal in 1838, when the Cherokee were forced to leave their homeland and resettle in Oklahoma, one of their regrets was that they were forced to leave behind their relatives who had gone to live with the Nunnehi. Storytelling has been and is an important tradition in Cherokee culture, and the Nunnehi remain a popular subject of many stories. There are some Cherokee still living in their native land that claim to have had encounters with the Nûñnë'hï.

== See also ==
- Fairy
- Nymph
