= Changeling: The Dreaming =

Tabletop role-playing game

- First edition cover art
- Designers: 1st edition: Mark Rein·Hagen, Sam Chupp, Ian Lemke, Joshua Gabriel Timbrook; 2nd edition: Ian Lemke, Jackie Cassada, Brian Campbell, Richard Dansky, Chris Howard, Angel Leigh McCoy, Neil Mick, Nicky Rea
- Publishers: White Wolf Publishing
- Publication: July 1995 (1st edition); August 7, 1997 (2nd edition); September 13, 2017 (20th Anniversary Edition)
- Genres: Personal fantasy
- Systems: Storyteller System
- Series: World of Darkness
- ISBN: 1-56504-700-1 (1st edition): 1-56504-716-8 (2nd edition)

Changeling: The Dreaming is a tabletop role-playing game originally published by White Wolf Publishing in July 1995, and is part of the World of Darkness series. Player characters are changelings, fae souls reborn into human bodies, a practice begun by the fae to protect themselves as magic vanished from the world. White Wolf Publishing released a second edition in 1997, and Onyx Path Publishing released a 20th Anniversary Edition in 2017.

The game explores the balance between imagination and practicality, and the struggle of art and beauty against the dark, mysterious "Gothic-Punk" World of Darkness. Changeling draws primarily from Gaelic mythology, particularly stories of the sidhe and Tuatha Dé Danann, but also uses mythology and folklore from various other cultures including Native American nations, Greece, India and Yoruba mythology of Africa.

== Overview ==
The fae are creatures of dreams, drawing magical power and their very existence from "Glamour", the dreams of mankind. Glamour created and maintains a separate realm of imagination known as the Dreaming, from which the fae originally came to the mortal world. During the Iron Age and the subsequent rise of rational thought and science, glamour became less common in the real world, and the opposing force of banality could injure or kill the fae. In response, the fae nobility (the sidhe) withdrew to Arcadia, their home deep in the Dreaming, and the commoner fae developed "the Changeling Way Ritual" and metamorphosed into changelings. Eventually banality became so strong that the Dreaming was sundered from reality. This time period is known as the Shattering and it is associated with the time of the Black Plague. It was at this time that the Changeling Way ritual was created allowing fae spirits to inhabit human bodies alongside the human host's soul. For many years commoner changelings lived amongst mortals and made their way as best they could in a world where glamour was fading, this was the Interregnum. Then came the Resurgence, man landed on the moon and belief and dreams broke open the doors to Arcadia. Some sidhe were able to return by inhabiting existing human bodies. With the return of the sidhe and their desire to once again rule all changelings, the Accordance War broke out. Commoners and nobles fought for control of the freeholds and glamour until a peace accord was reached by the new High King David.

Traditionally, a changeling is a fairy child substituted for a human baby, but Changeling: The Dreaming uses a very different interpretation. In the game, a changeling is a fae soul born into a human body. Early in the human's life, usually before puberty, they undergo the "Chrysalis", a magical awakening of the fae soul which previously lay dormant. Once through the Chrysalis, the Changeling exists simultaneously in both the "real" world and in the "chimerical" reality of the fae, where creative ideas and imagination have substance. (The metaphysical aspects of this are the complex concepts present in the game.) The human soul becomes joined with/cohabits alongside the fae soul.

As well as the usual roleplaying traits representing their skills and abilities, Changeling characters are further defined by their ties to the Dreaming. Each Changeling has Seelie and Unseelie aspects of their being, one of which dominates a given Changeling. The courts do not easily map onto human ideas of good and evil, but instead represent a host of philosophies - light and shadow, law and freedom, duty and passion. In days past rule would be divided between the courts, the Seelie court ruling in the summer months from Beltaine to Samhain, and the Unseelie court in winter from Samhain to Beltaine, but now an uneasy truce exists and each court rules its own regions. Each Changeling has two legacies, one for each court, which represent how the dual nature of their fae soul is expressed.

Each Changeling is also a member of a "kith". Somewhat like different species of fairy, a Changeling's kith indicates the kind of dreams which birthed their soul in the Dreaming. The kiths are based on fairy archetypes from various sources, and while the most common kiths are drawn largely from Irish mythology, many others also exist. The descriptions below touch on only a few of the types of stories or traditional fairies which correlate to each Kith.

Each Changeling also falls into a certain seeming which is related to their age. The seemings include Childlings, which are the youngest group between the ages of three and thirteen; Wilders, which are between the ages of thirteen and twenty-five; and Grumps, which include any older changelings though they rarely make it very long before becoming undone. As Changelings age and pass through the various seemings they lose some of their glamour, which is the stuff changeling magic is made of. They also gain Banality, a force created by mortal disbelief.

=== Seelie Court ===
The Seelie have a reputation as the guardians of fae traditions. They are the peacekeepers, protectors of the weak, and uphold the ideals of chivalry. Most Seelie seek the reunion between the mortal world and the dreaming, and would like to return to the time before the realms became divided.

=== The Seelie Code ===
- Death before dishonor: Honor is the most important virtue, the source of all glory.
- Love Conquers all: Love lies at the heart of the dreaming. True love transcends all and epitomizes what it means to be Seelie.
- Beauty is life: Beauty is a timeless, objective quality that, while it cannot be defined, is always recognized for itself.
- Never forget a debt: One gift deserves another. The recipient of a gift is obliged to return the favor.

=== Unseelie Court ===
Where the Seelie dedicate themselves to preserving the traditions of the fae, the Unseelie style themselves as mockers of those traditions. They stand for the principles of constant change and impulsive action. They have a reputation for fostering war and madness, despising those weaker than themselves, and valuing freedom and wildness over any chivalric code. The Unseelie see themselves as radical visionaries, bringing about vital change and transformation through whatever means necessary, including violence. Most members of the Unseelie court believe that the Dreaming has abandoned them, and therefore, that they owe no special loyalty to it or to their lost home of Arcadia.

=== The Unseelie Code ===
- Change is good: Security does not exist. The slightest of circumstances can transform a king into a peasant. Chaos and discord rule the universe. Adapt or die.
- Glamour is free: Glamour is worthless unless used. Acquire it by any means possible, and you will never be without a constant supply.
- Honor is a lie: Honor has no place in the modern world. It is a fairy tale constructed to cover the essential emptiness behind most traditions.
- Passion before duty: Passion is the truest state of the fae spirit. Follow your instincts and act on your impulses. Live life to the fullest without regard to the consequences; they will come about regardless of what you do. Youth passes quickly, so have fun while you can. Death can come at any time, so live without regret.

== Kiths ==
=== The standard kiths ===
- Boggan – workers and busybodies, house fairies, gnomes. The dream of the home, the hearth and the people who tend it.
- Eshu – African or Indian spirits; travellers, storytellers, adventurers. The dream of foreign and exotic people, places and the freedom of travel.
- Nocker – technological beings, like dwarves and gremlins. The dream of technological creativity and creation of your dreams, but also the frustration which people feel when their dreams fail to meet up with reality.
- Pooka – tricksters, shapechangers, animal spirits, Púca. They dream of a carefree and less controlled life, similar to that of animals which the pooka have affinities with.
- Redcap – murderers and cannibals, monsters, hobgoblins. Formed from the bottomless hunger which people felt in the depth of winter and the desperation which people felt to fight their hunger.
- Satyr – lovers and revellers, horned god, Pan. Formed from the deep passions and lusts of mortals.
- Sidhe – the nobility, Lords and Ladies, elves, the Shining Host. The dream of all that is noble and honourable in leaders, but also the arrogance of many leaders.
- Sluagh – keepers of secrets, bogeymen, shadows. The dream of all creepy-crawly which crawl about in the dark of the night, tap on the windows and can never be seen in the clear light.
- Troll – honour-bound warriors, titans, giants. The dream of the honorable and chivalric warrior.

In the Changeling: the Dreaming 20th Anniversary publication, Piskies, Selkies, and Clurichaun were added. The Sidhe were divided into two different Kiths: Autumn Sidhe and Arcadian Sidhe.

=== The Gallain – Kiths not from the corebook ===
- The Nunnehi – this comprises 13 individual kiths, based on Native American geographies, tribes, lore, and archetypes; include the May-may-gway-shi, Rock Giants, Water Babies, Nanehi and Kachina among others.
- The Thallain – introduced in the Shadow Court book, these were dark reflections of the standard kith who had their origins in nightmares and were bent on malice and destruction. They had escaped into the mortal world along with the other members of the Shadow Court, and often pretended to be "normal" Changelings; include the Beasties (resembling Pookas), Boggarts (resembling Boggans), Bogies (resembling Sluagh), Ogres (resembling Trolls) and Goblins (resembling Nockers).
- The Menehune – similar to the Nunnehi, the Menehune are a race of their own existing only in Hawaii; they have their own Kiths which reflect their social roles.
- The Inanimae – a series of 6 kiths, five of which are based on the classical elements (with earth split into rock and wood) and one based on human creations; their equivalent of the Court system is based on whether they are occurring naturally or have been crafted somehow by humans.
- Clurichaun – from the Immortal Eyes: Court of All Kings Sourcebook; leprechauns.
- Piskies – childish tricksters, imps, pixies.
- Selkies – sea and seal spirits, skin changers.
- Gillhe Dhu – tree spirits of Britain, dryads, the Green Man. (See also dryad.)
- Kinain – technically not a fae kith themselves, these are humans with enough fae blood to work with glamour in the way changelings do.
- Adhene – the Dark-kin that were released from their confines in the Dreaming after the destruction of the Ravnos Antediluvian. Many are allied with the Fomorians.
- Spriggan – child thieves.
- River Hags – closely related to Redcaps, but able to breathe water. Connected to some sort of river; cannot leave area of said river for more than a week without starting to die.
- Oba – the little known nobility of the Eshu. Bound to land they rule over. Have perfect, regal features and glowing orbs for eyes.

==== Hsien ====
Found in the book Land of Eight Million Dreams (by James A. Moore) these are the closest equivalent to kithain native to the realms of central and western Asia. More so than any other of the gallain, the hsien are not like standard changelings. They use an entirely different system of magic much closer to that of Mage: The Ascension. The closest analogue mythologically are the Hsien or Shinma, small gods who were once the servants of greater spirits and who now must secretly answer the prayers of the faithful. Rather than their souls being born into human bodies, Hsien appropriate the bodies and mortal personalities of the recently deceased, usually hiding the fact that they died at all. They are organised into ten "kwannon-jin", kith-like divisions which include the noble Kamuii and the commoner Hirayanu.

- Each of the Kamuii are aligned with one of the five Chinese elements: Suijen (Water), Chu-ih-yu (Metal), Komuko (Earth), Hou-chi (Wood) and Chu Jung (Fire).
- The Hirayanu are equivalent to the commoner kith; each can metamorphose into a certain type of animal. There are five: the Nyan (cats), Tanuki (badgers), Hanumen (monkeys), Heng Po (usually fish, particularly carp or catfish, or sometimes dolphins) and Fu Hsi (snakes).

==== The Mer ====
Introduced in the Blood-Dimmed Tides World of Darkness sourcebook: Merfolk (Tritons, mermaids, mermen, the ocean's nobles and seducers) and Murdhuacha (pronounced me-ROO-cha; Nucks, Merrow, sea monsters). These two Kiths both begin life as Nereids (Mer children, or the "larval" stage) yet attain maturity by merging with an Apsara, a sea creature ritually bonded with the Nereid to form roughly half of the changeling's new body (usually the body's lower half and the extremities). Nereids whose Apsarae are bony fishes, sharks, cetaceans or even oceanic reptiles evolve into merfolk; Nereids who bond with crustaceans, jellyfish, squids, octopuses, worms or other oceanic invertebrates become murdhuacha. The two Kiths are traditionally mortal enemies, but the rising tides of Banality and the human defilement of the oceans have forced merfolk and murduacha into an unsteady truce.

== History ==
Changeling: The Dreaming was originally published by White Wolf Publishing in July 1995. A second edition was released on August 7, 1997, premiering at the Gen Con gaming convention in Milwaukee. Changeling: The Dreaming 20th Anniversary Edition was released on September 13, 2017, by Onyx Path Publishing – a company formed by ex-White Wolf Publishing staff.

A Player's Guide supplement for Changeling: The Dreaming was released in 1996, adding additional abilities, legacies, flaws and merits not included in the base game's rulebook, material relating to the Autumn People which had been left out of the rulebook due to printing errors, and new information on the game world.

Time of Judgment, published in early 2004, included a chapter on the end of the world from a Changeling's perspective, and was the last official published material for the game.

Dark Ages: Fae is a World of Darkness: Dark Ages game with strong links to Changeling.

== Changeling in the Chronicles of Darkness ==
In August 2006, White Wolf published Promethean: The Created, which included an advertisement for a 2007 version of Changeling, confirming the rumors that Changelings would appear in the Chronicles of Darkness setting (then known as the "new" World of Darkness).

In April 2007, White Wolf unveiled the new "Changeling" line, Changeling: The Lost, and updated their site periodically with information about the new game. The game approaches changeling legends more traditionally: the characters are actual humans who were stolen by the Fae, taken to Arcadia as slaves, and finally escaped back to Earth. Their magical nature is the result of changes wrought upon them in the world of the Faerie. The types of changelings lack any direct connection to a particular culture's legends. The Fae are purely antagonists, while Courts are determined by the four seasons, and the spiritual and past life dimensions have been discarded.

Changeling: The Lost was released on August 16, 2007.

== Reception ==
Reception
Review scores
Source	Rating
Arcane	6/10
Backstab	8/10

Lucya Szachnowski of Arcane magazine called the game bland compared to White Wolf's other games, felt it failed to create an atmosphere of its own, and criticized the developers' decision to have most fae emigrate to America as it removed the option to have stories set in "the homelands of the brothers Grimm or Hans Christian Andersen". Szachnowski appreciated the use of cantrip cards and the option to play with or without them, but criticized the game's rules for lacking depth, commenting that if the game "had been the first Storyteller game I doubt it would have sold as well as Vampire".

Changeling: The Dreaming was the sixth highest selling role-playing game in France in the August – September 1996 period.

== Reviews ==
- Shadis #23 (Jan. 1996)
- Dosdediez (Número 8 - Jul 1996)
- Rollespilsmagasinet Fønix (Danish) (Issue 10 - October/November 1995)
- Envoyer (German) (Issue 3 - Jan 1997)
- d8 Magazine #3
- Australian Realms #27
- Coleção Dragão Brasil

== See also ==
- List of Changeling: The Dreaming books
