= List of role-playing game designers =

A role-playing game (RPG) is a game in which players assume and play out the roles of characters in a fictional setting. Players take responsibility for acting out these roles within a narrative, either through literal acting or through a process of structured decision-making regarding character development. Actions taken within many games succeed or fail according to a formal system of rules and guidelines.

There are several forms of role-playing games. The original form, sometimes called the tabletop role-playing game (TTRPG), is conducted through discussion, whereas in live action role-playing (LARP), players physically perform their characters' actions.

The design of role-playing games may include the creation of game systems, game settings, and scenarios for roleplaying; game designers engage in one or more of these activities as they create, revise, and develop role-playing games. For each designer, this list includes notable games that they designed or authored.

ENNIE Awards are presented for tabe top role-playing games. The Origins Awards are presented by Game Manufacturers Association for outstanding work in the tabletop gaming industry. The Charles S. Roberts Award and the Charles Roberts Awards Hall of Fame are given in recognition of excellence in manual tabletop games, with a focus on conflict simulations.

== List of designers ==
Following is a list of individuals who have designed one or more role-playing games, including live-action role-playing games and tabletop role-playing games, but excluding role-playing video games (see List of video game industry people and its children for video game creators). Artists are listed separately on the annotated List of role-playing game artists. Publishing companies are listed under List of role-playing game publishers.

Designer	Notable work	Honors	Ref.
Justin Achilli	Vampire: The Dark Ages, Victorian Age: Vampire, and Vampire: The Requiem		
Mark Acres	Tomb of the Lizard King, Chill, New Beginnings, Creature Feature, Evenings of Terror, Clash of Kings, Star Ace, and Time Master		
Peter Adkison	The Primal Order	Hall of Fame	
Avery Alder	Monsterhearts		
Dave Allsop	The Contract Directory and SLA Industries		
Aaron Allston	Autoduel Champions, Dungeons & Dragons, Ghostbusters International, Hollow World Campaign Set, and Star Wars	Hall of Fame	
Terry K. Amthor	Shadow World, Rolemaster, Space Master, and Kult	Hall of Fame	
Sandy Antunes	Faery's Tale		
Dave Arneson	Dungeons & Dragons, Blackmoor, Adventures in Blackmoor, and Temple of the Frog	Hall of Fame	
Dave Arneson	Dungeons & Dragons, Blackmoor, Adventures in Blackmoor, and Temple of the Frog	Spiel des Jahres (2)	
L. Ross Babcock III	Behind Enemy Lines and Star Trek: The Role Playing Game 2nd edition		
Wilf K. Backhaus	Chivalry & Sorcery and The Chivalry & Sorcery Sourcebook		
Keith Baker	Dragons of Eberron		
Meguey Baker	Apocalypse World		
Richard Baker	Birthright Campaign Setting, Red Hand of Doom, Alternity, Tome of Battle: The Book of Nine Swords, Lords of Madness, Lost Empires of Faerûn, Star Drive, and Gamma World 7th edition	Origins Awards	
Vincent Baker	Apocalypse World and Dogs in the Vineyard		
Jim Bambra	Apocrypha Now, The Complete Book of Dwarves, Space Gods, The Sea People, The Golden Khan of Ethengar, Night's Dark Terror, Ravager of Time, Dark Clouds Gather, All That Glitters..., Blade of Vengeance, Warhammer Fantasy Roleplay, and Ruins of Adventure		
Cam Banks	Leverage: The Roleplaying Game and Marvel Heroic Roleplaying	Origins Awards	
Jeff Barber	Killer Crosshairs and Blue Planet		
M. A. R. Barker	Tékumel, Dogs in the Vineyard, and Empire of the Petal Throne	Indie RPG Awards	
Kevin Barrett	Space Master		
Andrew Bates	Trinity Continuum: Æon		
Wolfgang Baur	Planes of Chaos, Secrets of the Lamp, Assassin Mountain, Warlock of the Stonecrowns, Doom of Daggerdale, Expedition to the Demonweb Pits, Dark•Matter, and Frostburn		
Bruce Baugh	Nexus: The Infinite City and Clanbook: Lasombra (revised)		
Whitney "Strix" Beltrán	Bluebeard's Bride	Indie Groundbreaker Award	
Greg Benage	Blue Planet		
Scott Bennie	VIPER: Coils of the Serpent, Testament: Roleplaying in the Biblical Era, Islands of Terror, Old Empires, Otherlands, Monstrous Compendium Volume 1 and 2, Castle Greyhawk, The Book of Lairs II, and Adventure Pack I		
Chris Birch	Legends of Anglerre		
Sharang Biswas	Avatar Legends: The Roleplaying Game	ENNIE Awards	
Jolly Blackburn	HackMaster and Aces & Eights: Shattered Frontier	Hall of Fame	
Jason L. Blair	Little Fears		
Loyd Blankenship	GURPS Cyberpunk		
Bob Bledsaw	Wilderlands of High Fantasy		
Anders Blixt	Down Darker Trails 2nd edition		
Brian Blume	Eldritch Wizardry, Boot Hill, Gamma World, The Rogues Gallery		
Emily Care Boss	Breaking the Ice		
Eric L. Boyd	Faiths & Avatars, Champions of Ruin, The Grand History of the Realms, Power of Faerûn, Shadowdale: The Scouring of the Land, Expedition to Undermountain, City of Splendors: Waterdeep, and Serpent Kingdoms		
Rob Boyle	Shadowrun 4th edtion, Eclipse Phase, Target: Wastelands, Target: Awakened Lands, Year of the Comet, and Man & Machine: Cyberware		
Michael Breault	Dragons of Truth, Oriental Adventures, Dungeon World, Greyhawk Ruins, Alien Realms, and The Book of Lairs		
James Herbert Brennan	Man, Myth & Magic and Timeship		
Bill Bridges	Werewolf: The Apocalypse, Mage: The Ascension, Promethean: The Created, Mage: the Awakening, Pendragon, Street Fighter, Star Trek: The Next Generation Role-playing Game, Star Trek: Deep Space Nine Role-playing Game, Passion Play, Eclipse Phase, and Emperor of the Fading Suns		
Gerald Brom	Dark Sun	Hall of Fame	
Anne Brown	Ship of Horror, Falconmaster, Flames of the Falcon, Adventure Pack I, and The Book of Lairs II		
Timothy Brown	Dungeon World, Dragon Kings, Traveller Supplement 9: Fighting Ships, 2300 AD, and Dark Sun		
Dave J. Browne	Beyond the Crystal Cave, The Final Enemy, and The Sinister Secret of Saltmarsh		
Phil Brucato	Mage: The Sorcerers Crusade, Werewolf: The Apocalypse, and Mage: The Ascension		
Jason Bulmahn	Pathfinder Roleplaying Game, Dungeonscape, Elder Evils, Expedition to the Ruins of Greyhawk, Living Greyhawk, and Secrets of Xen'drik	ENNIE Awards (9)	
Jason Bulmahn	Pathfinder Roleplaying Game, Dungeonscape, Elder Evils, Expedition to the Ruins of Greyhawk, Living Greyhawk, and Secrets of Xen'drik	Origins Award	
Rich Burlew	Monster Manual III, Explorer's Handbook, and Dungeonscape		
Jim Butler	Oathbound: Domains of the Forge, Netheril: Empire of Magic, The Secret of Spiderhaunt, The Return of Randal Morn, and The Sword of the Dales		
Peter Cakebread	Dark Streets		
James Cambias	Star Hero		
Brian Campbell	Mage: The Awakening, Victorian Age: Vampire, Clanbook: Nosferatu revised edition, Werewolf: The Apocalypse revised edition and 2nd edition, Wraith: The Oblivion, Spaceship Zero, Axis Mundi: The Book of Spirits, The Shadow Court, Changeling: The Dreaming 2nd edition, Street Fighter: The Storytelling Game, Book of the Wyrm 2nd edition, Hengeyokai: Shapeshifters of the East, The Technomancer's Toybox, Transylvania Chronicles I: Dark Tides Rising, The Book of Mirrors: Mage Storytellers Handbook, and Fading Suns	ENNIE Award	
C. J. Carella	Angel Roleplaying Game, Armageddon: The End Times, Buffy the Vampire Slayer Roleplaying Game, Slayer's Handbook, Abomination Codex, All Flesh Must Be Eaten, CJ Carella's WitchCraft, GURPS Voodoo: The Shadow War, Nightbane, Rifts World Book Nine: South America 2, Rifts Mercenaries, and GURPS War Against the Chtorr		
Jason Carl	Silver Marches, Diablo II: To Hell and Back, Lords of Darkness, Sword and Fist, The Apocalypse Stone, and Dungeons & Dragons Adventure Game		
Mike Carr	In Search of the Unknown		
Michele Carter	Dungeons & Dragons 4th edition		
Marcelo Cassaro	3DeT		
Frank Chadwick	En Garde!, Twilight: 2000, Traveller, 2300 AD, Space: 1889, and Dark Conspiracy	Hall of Fame	
Jamie Chambers	Dragonlance Campaign Setting and Serenity Role Playing Game	Origins Awards	
Jamie Chambers	Dragonlance Campaign Setting and Serenity Role Playing Game	ENNIE Awards	
John Chambers	Mage: The Ascension revised edition and Orpheus		
Banana Chan	Jiangshi: Blood in the Banquet Hall and Daggerheart		
Coleman Charlton	Rolemaster		
Robert N. Charrette	Bushido, Aftermath!, Daredevils, and Scenario Pack 1: Into the Ruins - The City of Littleton	Hall of Fame	
David Chart	Medieval Player's Manual and The Wizard's Grimoire		
Davis Chenault	Castles & Crusades		
Stephen Chenault	A Lion in the Ropes		
Troy Christensen	Phantasm Adventures and Advanced Phantasm Adventures, Thief's Challenge, Arms and Equipment Guide, The Castle Guide, and Devil's Domain		
Deborah Teramis Christian	Tales of the Outer Planes, The Minrothad Guilds, Lords of Darkness, Bestiary of Dragons and Giants, Adventure Pack I, and Kara-Tur: The Eastern Realms		
Mike Chinn	Legends of Anglerre		
Troy Christensen	Advanced Phantasm Adventures, Thief's Challenge, Arms and Equipment Guide, The Castle Guide, Devil's Domain, and Most Wanted Volume 3		
Deborah Teramis Christian	Citybook VII: King's River Bridge, Dragon Dawn, Kara-Tur: The Eastern Realms, Lords of Darkness, The Minrothad Guilds, Tales of the Outer Planes, Adventure Pack I, and The Book of Lairs II		
Sam Chupp	Wraith: the Oblivion, Mage: The Ascension, and Changeling: The Dreaming	Origins Award	
Ken Cliffe	Ars Magica 3rd edition, World of Darkness, and Trinity and Hunter: The Reckoning		
Paul Cockburn	Blood & Lust and Apocrypha Now		
Bill Coffin	Systems Failure		
Genevieve Cogman	Exalted 2nd Edition, Orpheus, In Nomine, Exalted, and The Dresden Files Roleplaying Game		
Loren L. Coleman	Earthdawn Companion 2nd edition and BattleTech Compendium		
Andy Collins	Complete Divine, Libris Mortis, Unearthed Arcana, Complete Warrior, Draconomicon, Book of Challenges, Epic Level Handbook, Lord of the Iron Fortress, Star Wars Gamemaster Screen, Dungeons & Dragons Adventure Game, and Star Wars Roleplaying Game		
William W. Connors	The Republic of Darokin, Monstrous Compendium, Legends & Lore, The Atruaghin Clans, Van Richten's Guide to Ghosts, Quest for the Silver Sword, Hordes of Dragonspear, Forbidden Lore, Book of Artifacts, Thief's Player Pack, Masque of the Red Death and Other Tales, Fighter's Player Pack, Wizards and Rogues of the Realms, The Gothic Earth Gazetteer, Requiem: The Grim Harvest, Dragonlance: Fifth Age, and Champions of the Mists		
David Cook	Dungeons & Dragons Expert Set, Oriental Adventures, Conan Role-Playing Game, Dwellers of the Forbidden City, The Isle of Dread, Master of the Desert Nomads, Temple of Death, Earthshaker!, The Veiled Society, Conan Unchained!, Blizzard Pass, and Crimefighters		
Monte Cook	Dungeons & Dragons, Ptolus, and Numenera	Hall of Fame	
Sue Weinlein Cook	Dragonlance: Fifth Age and SAGA System		
Bruce Cordell	Return to the Tomb of Horrors, The Gates of Firestorm Peak, A Darkness Gathering, Return to White Plume Mountain, Die Vecna Die!, Reverse Dungeon, The Sunless Citadel, Heart of Nightfang Spire, Bastion of Broken Souls, Grasp of the Emerald Claw, Underdark, Tome and Blood, Bastion of Faith, Psionics Handbook, and Epic Level Handbook, The Strange, Manual of the Planes, and Numenera	Origins Award	
Bruce Cordell	Return to the Tomb of Horrors, The Gates of Firestorm Peak, A Darkness Gathering, Return to White Plume Mountain, Die Vecna Die!, Reverse Dungeon, The Sunless Citadel, Heart of Nightfang Spire, Bastion of Broken Souls, Grasp of the Emerald Claw, Underdark, Tome and Blood, Bastion of Faith, Psionics Handbook, and Epic Level Handbook, The Strange, Manual of the Planes, and Numenera	ENNIE Awards (6)	
Steven Cordovano	The Compleat Alchemist		
Peter Corless	Perilous Forest and The Spectre King		
Greg Costikyan	Star Wars: The Roleplaying Game, Toon, and Paranoia	Hall of Fame	
Luke Crane	The Burning Wheel, Burning Empires, and Mouse Guard Roleplaying Game	Origins Awards (2)	
Jeremy Crawford	Dungeons & Dragons 4th edition, Dungeons & Dragons 5th edition, Warhammer Fantasy Roleplay 2nd edition, Mutants & Masterminds, and Blue Rose	ENNIE Awards (2)	
Croc	In Nomine Satanis/Magna Veritas and Stella Inquisitorus		
N. Robin Crossby	Hârn and HarnMaster		
John H. Crowe III	Mortal Coils, The Realm of Shadows, and Coming Full Circle		
Paul Czege	My Life with Master and Nicotine Girls	Indie RPG Awards (2)	
Paul Czege	My Life with Master and Nicotine Girls	Diana Jones Award	
Tom Dalgliesh	Pilots' Almanac		
Ryan Dancey	Hero Builder's Guidebook and The Way of the Phoenix		
Liz Danforth	Tunnels & Trolls, Citybook VI: Up Town, Citybook V: Sideshow, The Northern Reaches, Citybook III: Deadly Nightside, Citybook II: Port o' Call, and Citybook I: Butcher, Baker, Candlestick Maker	Hall of Fame	
Richard Dansky	Orpheus, Wraith: The Great War, Darkness Revealed 1: Descent into Darkness, Darkness Revealed 2: Passage Through Shadow, Darkness Revealed 3: Ascent into Light, Kindred of the East, Mage: The Sorcerers Crusade, The Werewolf Players Guide 2nd edition, Kithbook: Sluagh, Libellus Sanguinis 1: Masters of the State, Werewolf: The Wild West, Giovanni Chronicles II: Blood & Fire, and Changeling: The Dreaming		
Peter Darvill-Evans	Time Lord, Fighting Fantasy Gamebook 37: Portal of Evil, Fighting Fantasy Gamebook 25: Beneath Nightmare Castle, and Fighting Fantasy Gamebook 45: Spectral Stalkers		
Graeme Davis	Warhammer Fantasy Roleplay, Mind's Eye Theatre, Celts Campaign Sourcebook, Ashes of Middenheim, Green and Pleasant Land, Vampire: The Masquerade, The Succubus Club, A World of Darkness, Wraith: The Oblivion, Clanbook: Assamite, Apocrypha Now, Wraith: The Oblivion 2nd edition, A World of Darkness 2nd edition, GURPS Vikings 2nd edition, GURPS Middle Ages I, Tales of Freeport, Creatures of Freeport, and Mythic Britain & Ireland	ENNIE Awards (3)	
Marcelo Del Debbio	RPGQuest: The Knights Templar		
Jesse Decker	Dungeons & Dragons 4th edition, Complete Adventurer, Dungeon Master's Guide II, Races of Eberron, Monster Manual III, Races of Stone, Unearthed Arcana, Arms and Equipment Guide, The Avatar's Handbook, Denizens of Freeport, and Fiend Folio		
Tim Dedopulos	The Contract Directory, Elevator to the Netherworld: The Inner Kingdom Sourcebook, and Mort Sourcebook		
Jeff Dee	Villains and Vigilantes		
Troy Denning	Dark Sun, Legends & Lore, Chill 2nd edition, Black Courser, and Galaxy Guide 4: Alien Races rev. edition		
James Desborough	Gor, Dark Sun, The Munchkin's Guide to Powergaming, and Macho Women with Guns	Origins Award	
Dennis Detwiller	co-author of Delta Green, Godlike and Nemesis		
Joe Dever	Lone Wolf and Freeway Warrior		
Flint Dille	Sagard the Barbarian		
Larry DiTillio	Masks of Nyarlathotep, The Grey Knight, Demon Magic: The Second Stormbringer Companion, and Call of Cthulhu		
Michael Dobson	The Throne of Bloodstone, The Bloodstone Wars, The Mines of Bloodstone, and Dragons of Mystery		
Kevin Dockery	The Morrow Project		
Rob Donoghue	Spirit of the Century, The Dresden Files Roleplaying Game, Leverage: The Roleplaying Game, FATE, and Marvel Heroic Roleplaying	ENNIE Awards (3)	
Rob Donoghue	Spirit of the Century, The Dresden Files Roleplaying Game, Leverage: The Roleplaying Game, FATE, and Marvel Heroic Roleplaying	Origins Award	
Dale Donovan	Jakandor, Land of Legend, Planes of Conflict, Player's Option: Skills & Powers, and Dark Sun Campaign Setting, Expanded and Revised		
Tom Dowd	Cybertechnology, Bug City, Denizens of Earthdawn Volume One, Fields of Fire, Shadowrun 2nd edition, Street Samurai Catalog revised edition, Downtown Militarized Zone, Elven Fire, The Neo-Anarchist's Guide to North America, Vampire: The Masquerade, Virtual Realities, Harlequin, Daredevil Adventures 3: Supernatural Thrillers Issue, and F.O.R.C.E.	Origins Award	
Ann Dupuis	Joshuan's Almanac & Book of Facts and GURPS Old West		
Kim Eastland	Conan the Buccaneer, Conan the Mercenary, The Minrothad Guilds, Pit of the Viper, Fault Line, The Last Resort, Children of the Atom, and Realms of Magic		
Ron Edwards	Sorcerer, ELFS, Trollbabe, It Was a Mutual Decision, Spione: Story Now in Cold War Berlin, Charnel Gods, Human of the Year, and S/lay w/Me	Diana Jones Award	
Ron Edwards	Sorcerer, ELFS, Trollbabe, It Was a Mutual Decision, Spione: Story Now in Cold War Berlin, Charnel Gods, Human of the Year, and S/lay w/Me	Indie RPG Awards	
Skaff Elias	Chainmail and Miniatures Handbook		
Larry Elmore	The History of Dragonlance	Hall of Fame	
Sean Patrick Fannon	The Fantasy Roleplaying Gamer's Bible, and High Tech Enemies		
Bill Fawcett	Beastmaker Mountain		
Raymond E. Feist	Tulan of the Isles and Jonril: Gateway to the Sunken Lands		
Andrew Finch	Theatrix and Monster Manual III		
Nigel Findley	GURPS Illuminati, Dungeons of Despair, Aztlan, Dangerous Prey, Denizens of Earthdawn Volume Two, Corporate Shadowfiles, Dark Alliance: Vancouver, Van Richten's Guide to Werebeasts, Greyspace, Native American Nations Volume One, The Neo-Anarchist's Guide to North America, The Succubus Club, Tome of Magic, The Castle Guide, Draconomicon, Paranormal Animals of North America, and Greyhawk Adventures	Hall of Fame	
Matt Forbeck	Mutant Chronicles, Marvel Multiverse Role-Playing Game, Deadlands, Independence Day, Races of Faerûn, Unapproachable East, The Lord of the Rings Roleplaying Game, Stronghold Builder's Guidebook, JLA Sourcebook, Brave New World, Mind Lords of the Last Sea, and Sages & Specialists	Origins Awards (3)	
John M. Ford	The Yellow Clearance Black Box Blues, GURPS Time Travel, GURPS Infinite Worlds, and Scared Stiffs	Origins Awards (3)	
Crystal Frasier	Pathfinder Roleplaying Game		
Joe Fugate	Traveller Book 8: Robots		
Phil Gallagher	Apocrypha Now, Night's Dark Terror, Warhammer Fantasy Roleplay, Dark Clouds Gather, Blade of Vengeance, When a Star Falls, and Where Chaos Reigns		
Anthony J. Gallela	Theatrix		
Charles E. Gannon	Hard Times		
Jose Garcia	Nexus: The Infinite City		
Marc Gascoigne	Judge Dredd: The Role-Playing Game		
Ajit George	Journeys through the Radiant Citadel		
Adam Scott Glancy	Delta Green		
Lee Gold	Land of the Rising Sun, Lands of Adventure, and GURPS Japan		
Eric Goldberg	Commando, DragonQuest, and Paranoia		
Joseph Goodman	Dungeon Crawl Classics, Dragonmech, and Dinosaur Planet: Broncosaurus Rex		
Greg Gorden	DC Heroes 3rd edition, Star Wars: The Roleplaying Game 2nd edition, and Earthdawn		
Geoffrey C. Grabowski	Exalted		
Scott Fitzgerald Gray	Secrets of Sarlona		
Jonathan Green	Curse of the Mummy and Howl of the Werewolf		
Andrew Greenberg	Vampire: The Masquerade, Rapture: The Second Coming, and Fading Suns	Hall of Fame	
Daniel Greenberg	Digital Web, Who's Who Among Vampires: Children of the Inquisition, Wraith: The Oblivion, Giovanni Chronicles I: The Last Supper, Rage Across New York, The Werewolf Players Guide, Wraith: The Oblivion, Digital Web, Star Trek: The Next Generation Role-playing Game, Hot Rods of the Gods, and Werewolf: The Apocalypse 2nd edition	Origins Award	
Ed Greenwood	Forgotten Realms Campaign Setting, Power of Faerûn, Serpent Kingdoms, Pages from the Mages, Player's Guide to the Forgotten Realms Campaign, The Ruins of Myth Drannor, Volo's Guide to Waterdeep, Drow of the Underdark, The Ruins of Undermountain, Dwarves Deep, Forgotten Realms Adventures, Inside Ravens Bluff, The Living City, Lost Ships, Shadowdale, Tantras, The Book of Lairs II, The Endless Stair, Waterdeep and the North, and Inside Ravens Bluff, The Living City	Hall of Fame	
Ray Greer	Fuzion		
Jeff Grubb	High Adventure Cliffhangers Buck Rogers Adventure Game, Marvel Super Heroes: The Heroic Role-Playing Game, Urban Arcana, Warcraft: The Roleplaying Game, D20 Modern, Tempest Feud, Manual of the Planes, Gamma World, Neither Man nor Beast, Karameikos: Kingdom of Adventure, Forgotten Realms Campaign Setting 2nd edition, Al-Qadim: Arabian Adventures, Land of Fate, Tales of the Lance, Forgotten Realms Adventures, Hall of Heroes, Spelljammer: AD&D Adventures in Space, City System, Mad Monkey vs. the Dragon Claw, Forgotten Realms Campaign Setting, Manual of the Planes, Ochimo: The Spirit Warrior, and Marvel Super Heroes Advanced Set, Burned Bush Wells		
Gary Gygax	Dungeons & Dragons, Boot Hill, Eldritch Wizardry, Greyhawk, Monster Manual, Tomb of Horrors, Queen of the Spiders, Realms of Horror, Lejendary Adventure, Isle of the Ape, Unearthed Arcana, Dungeonland, The Land Beyond the Magic Mirror, and The Forgotten Temple of Tharizdun	Hall of Fame	
Richard Halliwell	Warhammer Fantasy Roleplay		
Allen Hammack	The Ghost Tower of Inverness, Day of Al'Akbar, Scourge of the Slave Lords, Fantastic Treasures, and Fantastic Treasures II		
Gareth Hanrahan	Conan: The Roleplaying Game 2nd edition, The Laundry, Dark Inheritance, Denizens of Freeport, The Game of Powers, and Lorefinder—The Pathfinder / GUMSHOE Mashup	ENNIE Award (2)	
Gabrielle Harbowy	Grotto of the Deluged God(Pathfinder Roleplaying Game), Behold...H'Catha (D&D Beyond), and Calling Upon the Dead (D&D Adventurers League)		
David A. Hargrave	The Arduin Adventure, The Howling Tower, The Citadel of Thunder, Death Heart, and Star Rovers		
Scott Haring	GURPS Horror 2nd edition, Empires of the Sands, The Republic of Darokin, and Citybook III: Deadly Nightside		
Bruce Harlick	Hero System Almanac 1		
Larry Harris	Axis & Allies		
John Harshman	Traveller		
Jess Hartley	Geist: The Sin-Eaters, Hunter: The Vigil, and Changeling: The Lost		
Robert Hatch	Aberrant, Exalted, and Werewolf: The Apocalypse 2nd edition, Kindred of the East, Trinity, and Charnel Houses of Europe: The Shoah		
Andria Hayday	Darklords		
Ed Healy	PC Pearls		
Bruce Heard	The Tree of Life, Into the Maelstrom, and Dragons of Faith		
Jess Heinig	Mage: The Ascension, Guide to the Sabbat, and Hunter: The Reckoning		
Bruce Heard	The Tree of Life, Into the Maelstrom, and Dragons of Faith		
Rob Heinsoo	Forgotten Realms Campaign Setting 3rd edition, Monsters of Faerûn, Player's Handbook 3rd edition, Nexus: The Infinite City, Stranger than Truth!, and 13th Age		
Steve Henderson	Balastor's Barracks, RuneQuest, Worlds of Wonder, and Superworld		
Arnold Hendrick	Swordbearer and The Tavern		
Shane Lacy Hensley	Deadlands, Savage Worlds, Army of Darkness Roleplaying Game, The Quick & the Dead, Deadlands: The Weird West, The Nightmare Lands, Denizens of Earthdawn Volume One, Masque of the Red Death and Other Tales, Terror in the Skies, When Axioms Collide, and Earth, Air, Fire, and Water		
Dale Henson	Netheril: Empire of Magic, Blood Enemies: Abominations of Cerilia, The Knight of Newts, The Magic Encyclopedia, Howl from the North, Buck Rogers XXVC, and Realmspace		
Jennifer Hepler	Shadowrun Companion and Cyberpirates!		
Keith Herber	Cthulhu Companion, H.P. Lovecraft's Dreamlands, Mansions of Madness, Cthulhu Now 2nd edition, Blood Brothers, The Compact Arkham Unveiled, 1920s Investigators' Companion, The Keeper's Companion, H. P. Lovecraft's Arkham, and The Fungi from Yuggoth		
Jack Herman	Villains and Vigilantes Revised Edition and Most Wanted, Volume 1		
Sterling Hershey	Monster Vault: Threats to the Nentir Vale and The Kathol Rift		
Laura Hickman	Rahasia, Pharaoh, Ravenloft, Dragons of War, Serenity Role Playing Game: Out in the Black, and Ravenloft II: The House on Gryphon Hill		
Tracy Hickman	House of Strahd, Tales of the Lance, Dragonlance Adventures, Dragons of Truth, Ravenloft II: The House on Gryphon Hill, Dragons of Dreams, Dragons of Wars, The Fourth Nail, Thunderdelve Mountain, Dragons of Hope, Rahasia, and Ravenloft		
Fred Hicks	Don't Rest Your Head, Spirit of the Century, and FATE	Indie RPG Awards	
Will Hindmarch	Kindred of the Ebony Kingdom, Eternal Lies, and Victorian Age: Vampire	ENNIE Awards (2)	
Kenneth Hite	Secret Societies, Star Trek: The Next Generation Role-playing Game, GURPS Infinite Worlds, GURPS Cabal, GURPS Horror 3rd edition, Trail of Cthulhu, Night's Black Agents, and Vampire: The Masquerade 5th edition		
John Eric Holmes	Dungeons & Dragons Basic Set		
Miranda Horner	The DarkStryder Campaign		
Grant Howitt	Heart: The City Beneath, Spire: The City Must Fall, Eat the Reich, and Honey Heist	ENNIE Awards (9)	
Conrad Hubbard	Mummy: The Resurrection, Promethean: The Created, Mage: The Awakening, Exalted 2nd edition, Werewolf: The Forsaken, Vampire: The Requiem, and World of Darkness	ENNIE Awards	
Paul Hume	Bushido, Aftermath!, Daredevils, Shadowrun, Threats, Virtual Realities 2.0, The Grimoire 2nd edition, Tharkold, The Neo-Anarchist's Guide to North America, Harlequin, and Mercurial		
Ross Isaacs	Lord of the Rings Roleplaying Game, Star Trek Roleplaying Game Narrator's Guide, Star Trek Roleplaying Game: Player's Guide, Star Trek: The Role Playing Game, Star Trek: The Next Generation Role-playing Game, The Way of D'era: The Romulan Star Empire, and Serpent Moon		
Steve Jackson (American)	The Fantasy Trip, GURPS, Killer: The Game of Assassination, GURPS Basic Set, GURPS Magic, and Steve Jackson's Man To Man	Hall of Fame	
Steve Jackson (British)	The Warlock of Firetop Mountain, Steve Jackson's Sorcery!, Creature of Havoc, and Deathtrap Dungeon		
James Jacobs	Fiendish Codex I: Hordes of the Abyss, Red Hand of Doom, Dungeon Master's Guide II, Lords of Madness: The Book of Aberrations, The Shackled City Adventure Path, Frostburn, Fiend Folio, Dungeons & Dragons 3rd edition, and Races of Faerûn		
Justin D. Jacobson	Dawning Star		
Brian R. James	Monster Vault: Threats to the Nentir Vale, Menzoberranzan: City of Intrigue, Forgotten Realms Campaign Guide, and The Grand History of the Realms	ENNIE Awards	
Matt James	Monster Vault: Threats to the Nentir Vale, Pathfinder Roleplaying Game: Bestiary 4, Into the Unknown: The Dungeon Survival Handbook	ENNIE Awards (2)	
Jennell Jaquays	The Caverns of Thracia, Dark Tower, and Griffin Mountain	Hall of Fame	
Robin Jenkins	The Book of Lairs II and Country Sites		
Gunilla Jonsson	Mutant and Kult		
Harold Johnson	Indiana Jones Judge's Survival Pack; The Golden Goddess; Tales of the Lance; Inside Ravens Bluff, The Living City; Dungeon Master's Design Kit; Adventure Pack I; Dragons of Faith; Night of the Seven Swords; The Hidden Shrine of Tamoachan; and Secret of the Slavers Stockade		
J. Hunter Johnson	GURPS Monsters and GURPS Japan 2nd edition		
Luke Johnson	Warcraft: The Roleplaying Game, Player's Guide to Eberron, Player's Handbook II, and Monster Manual V		
M. Alexander Jurkat	Conspiracy X Game Master's Screen, All Flesh Must Be Eaten, and Magic Item Compendium		
Adam Jury	Shadowrun 4th edition	ENNIE Awards (2)	
Lucian Kahn	Visigoths vs. Mall Goths, If I Were a Lich, Man, and Dead Friend: A Game of Necromancy		
Tim Kask	Blackmoor		
Don Kaye	Boot Hill		
J. Andrew Keith	Freedom Fighters		
William H. Keith Jr.	Behind Enemy Lines, Freedom Fighters, The Lords of Destiny, and The Doctor Who Role Playing Game		
Jonaya Kemper	Thirsty Sword Lesbians	Nebula Award	
Jonaya Kemper	Thirsty Sword Lesbians	ENNIE Awards (2)	
Steve Kenson	Mutants & Masterminds, Mutants & Masterminds: Ultimate Power, Freedom City, Silver Age Sentinels, and Blue Rose	ENNIE Award (2)	
Katharine Kerr	Legacy of Blood and Savage Mountains		
Shing Yin Khor	Field Guide to Memory	IndieCade Award	
Ulrich Kiesow	The Dark Eye		
J. Robert King	Tales of the Lance and Aurora's Whole Realms Catalog		
Mary Kirchoff	Dark Sun		
Jeff Koke	GURPS Vampire: The Masquerade and GURPS Black Ops	Origins Awards	
Rudy Kraft	Portals of Torsh, Legendary Duck Tower, Thieves' World 2nd edition, Portals of Twilight, Portals of Irontooth, Frontiers of Alusia, Break In at Three Kilometer Island, Heart of the Sunken Lands, Citybook II: Port o' Call, Snakepipe Hollow, and Griffin Mountain 2nd edition		
Charlie Krank	Gods of Glorantha, Gloranthan Bestiary, Pavis: Threshold to Danger, and Trollpak 2nd edition		
Rick Krebs	Gangbusters		
Heike Kubasch	Angmar: Land of the Witch King, High Adventure Role Playing, and Monstrous Compendium		
Christopher Kubasik	The Living Land, The Destiny Map, Bug City, Barsaive, Streets Tell Stories, Cracken's Rebel Field Guide, The Neo-Anarchist's Guide to North America, Orrorsh, Tome of Magic, Virtual Realities, and Draconomicon		
Robert J. Kuntz	The Eight Kings, Mordenkainen's Fantastic Adventure, Deities & Demigods, Greyhawk, and Gods, Demi-Gods & Heroes		
Amanda Hamon Kunz	Pathfinder Roleplaying Game, Starfinder Roleplaying Game, Van Richten's Guide to Ravenloft, and Southlands	ENnie Award	
David Ladyman	Tales of the Outer Planes, GURPS The Prisoner, Chill 2nd edition, and Fifth Cycle		
Mur Lafferty	Warcraft: The Roleplaying Game and Dark Ages: Mage		
Len Lakofka	The Secret of Bone Hill, The Assassin's Knot. and Deep Dwarven Delve		
Robin Laws	Ashen Stars, Dungeon Master's Guide II, Fear Itself, Burning Shaolin, Ghosts In the Black, Gaean Reach, HeroQuest, GURPS Fantasy II: Adventures in the Mad Lands, Hillfolk, Nexus: The Infinite City, Pantheon, Rune, Star Trek: The Next Generation Role-playing Game, Feng Shui, Dying Earth Roleplaying Game, The Esoterrorists, and Star Trek: The Role Playing Game	Diana Jones Award	
Jeff R. Leason	The Hidden Shrine of Tamoachan		
Andrew Leker	Skyrealms of Jorune		
Sam Lewis	DC Heroes and Earthdawn		
Paul Lidberg	Duel and Dragon Mountain		
Nicole Lindroos	Vampire: The Masquerade and Houses of Hermes		
Ian Livingstone	The Warlock of Firetop Mountain, Deathtrap Dungeon, Caverns of the Snow Witch, Blacksand, Temple of Terror, Freeway Fighter, Island of the Lizard King, City of Thieves, and The Forest of Doom		
Kerry Lloyd	Thieves' Guild, The Free City of Haven, and Haven: Secrets of the Labyrinth		
Steven S. Long	Dark Champions, The Ultimate Martial Artist, An Eye for an Eye, The Wheel of Time Roleplaying Game, Star Trek Roleplaying Game, Hero System 5th edition, and The Lord of the Rings Roleplaying Game	Origins Award	
Stacy Longstreet	Dungeons & Dragons		
Rick Loomis	Starweb and Buffalo Castle	Hall of Fame	
Rick Loomis	Starweb and Buffalo Castle	Origins Award	
James Lowder	The Jungles of Chult; Inside Ravens Bluff, The Living City; and Monstrous Compendium vol. 1 and vol. 2		
T. S. Luikart	The Red Star Campaign Setting, Nocturnals: A Midnight Companion, Skull & Bones, Warhammer Fantasy Roleplay 2nd edition, The One Ring Roleplaying Game, Dark Heresy, Dragon Age, and Eclipse Phase		
George MacDonald	Champions, Robot Warriors, Hero System Almanac 1, Fantasy Hero 2nd edition, Fantasy Hero Companion, and Hero System Rulebook 4th edition		
Mark C. MacKinnon	Big Eyes, Small Mouth, The Sailor Moon Role-Playing Game and Resource Book, and Silver Age Sentinels		
Jeff Mackintosh	Silver Age Sentinels		
Ari Marmell	Egyptian Adventures: Hamunaptra, Vampire: The Requiem, World's Largest Dungeon, Kindred of the Ebony Kingdom, Victorian Age: Vampire, World of Darkness: Mafia, Cityscape, and Fortress of the Yuan-Ti		
Ian Marsh	Time Lord		
Julia Martin	Faiths & Avatars		
Phil Masters	GURPS Arabian Nights and GURPS Discworld		
Colin McComb	Hellbound: The Blood War, Birthright Campaign Setting, and Masque of the Red Death and Other Tales		
Angel Leigh McCoy	Forgotten Realms, Earthdawn, Deadlands, Mage: The Ascension, Vampire: The Masquerade, Hunter: The Reckoning, and Changeling: The Dreaming		
Elizabeth McCoy	GURPS Illuminati University and GURPS In Nomine		
Anne Gray McCready	Mystery of the Snow Pearls, Red Sonja Unconquered, The Book of Lairs II, and The Kingdom of Ierendi		
Mike Mearls	Iron Heroes, Dungeons & Dragons 4th and 5th editions, Elevator to the Netherworld: The Inner Kingdom Sourcebook, and In the Belly of the Beast		
Frank Mentzer	To the Aid of Falx, The Investigation of Hydell, The Egg of the Phoenix, Doc's Island, The Immortal Storm, The Temple of Elemental Evil, and Cyborg Commando		
Marc Miller	Traveller	Hall of Fame	
Steve Miller	Into the Dragon's Lair, Alien Anthology, Rebellion Era Sourcebook, Die Vecna Die!, Hercules & Xena Roleplaying Game, Extreme Vengeance, and Chilling Tales		
Walter Milliken	GURPS Illuminati University and GURPS In Nomine		
Ryo Mizuno	Sword World RPG	Hall of Fame	
Kim Mohan	Jakandor, Island of War, Tobin's Spirit Guide, Wilderness Survival Guide, and Cyborg Commando		
Tom Moldvay	Mark of Amber, Twilight Calling, Lords of Creation, The Isle of Dread, Palace of the Silver Princess, Castle Amber, Mystara, and The Lost City		
Erik Mona	The Book of Fiends, Fiend Folio, Faiths and Pantheons, Dungeons & Dragons Gazetteer, Living Greyhawk Gazetteer, and Bastion of Faith		
Christian Moore	Aria: Canticle of the Monomyth and Star Trek: The Next Generation Role-playing Game The Lord of the Rings Roleplaying Game, Star Trek Roleplaying Game Narrator's Guide, Star Trek Roleplaying Game: Player's Guide, The Wheel of Time Roleplaying Game, Dune: Chronicles of the Imperium, Star Trek Roleplaying Game, Star Trek: Deep Space Nine Role Playing Game, The Way of D'era: The Romulan Star Empire, and Aria Worlds		
James A. Moore	Necropolis: Atlanta, Haunts, Land of Eight Million Dreams, and Dreams and Nightmares		
Roger E. Moore	Greyhawk: The Adventure Begins and Return of the Eight	Origins Award	
Jenna K. Moran	In Nomine, Ex Machina, Nobilis, and Weapons of the Gods	Diana Jones Award	
Jason Morningstar	Durance, Grey Ranks, and Fiasco	Diana Jones Award (2)	
Jason Morningstar	Durance, Grey Ranks, and Fiasco	IndieCade Award	
Dave Morris	Dragon Warriors		
Graeme Morris	The Sinister Secret of Saltmarsh, Beyond the Crystal Cave, and Fiend Folio		
Josh Mosqueira	Constantinople by Night and Tribe 8		
Pete Nash	RuneQuest 6th edition		
John Nephew	Castle Greyhawk, Tales of the Outer Planes, Kara-Tur: The Eastern Realms, The Complete Thief's Handbook, Legions of Thyatis, Arena of Thyatis, Sons of Azca, The Jade Hare, and Gamma World 4th edition	Hall of Fame	
Bruce Nesmith	Psionic Artifacts of Athas, First Quest, The Created, House of Strahd, Forbidden Lore, Gamma World 4th edition, Ravenloft: Realm of Terror, Hall of Heroes, Monstrous Compendium Volume 1 and 2, Tales of the Outer Planes, The Book of Lairs II, Sabre River, and The War Rafts of Kron		
Douglas Niles	Top Secret/S.I, Against the Cult of the Reptile God, Curse of Xanathon, and Horror on the Hill		
Clinton R. Nixon	The Shadow of Yesterday and Donjon	Indie RPG Awards	
David Noonan	Song and Silence, Manual of the Planes, Stronghold Builder's Guidebook, Complete Warrior, Races of Faerûn, Whispers of the Vampire's Blade, Unearthed Arcana, Races of Stone, Stormwrack, Heroes of Battle, Five Nations, Explorer's Handbook, Dungeon Master's Guide II, Player's Handbook II, and Tome of Magic: Pact, Shadow, and Truename Magic		
Mike Nystul	The Whispering Vault and Dangerous Prey		
Michael O'Brien	Sun County		
Steffan O'Sullivan	FUDGE, GURPS Swashbucklers, GURPS Bunnies & Burrows, and GURPS Bestiary		
Scott Palter	Fires of Marl and Metabarons #1 Path of the Warrior		
Blaine Pardoe	Domination		
Derek Pearcy	In Nomine	Origins Award	
Chris Perkins	TSR Jam 1999, Book of Exalted Deeds, Sons of Gruumsh, The Shackled City Adventure Path, and Curse of Strahd		
Jeff Perren	Chainmail		
Don Perrin	Dragonlance Campaign Setting and Sovereign Stone		
Steve Perrin	RuneQuest, Robot Warriors, Under Illefarn, Thieves' World, Call of Cthulhu, Gods of Glorantha, The Elfquest Companion, An Element of Danger, Legacy of Blood, Book of Lairs II, Adventure Pack I, Lords of Darkness, The Elves of Alfheim, Hall of Heroes, Elfquest, and River of Cradles		
Christian T. Petersen	Nocturnum and Cthulhu Now 2nd edition		
Michael Petersén	Mutant and KULT		
Sandy Petersen	Ghostbusters, H.P. Lovecraft's Dreamlands, Call of Cthulhu, Shadows of Yog-Sothoth, Cthulhu Companion, The Asylum & Other Tales, Gods of Glorantha, The Elfquest Companion, Land of Ninja, Gloranthan Bestiary, Trollpak, Into the Troll Realms, The Haunted Ruins, and Dorastor: Land of Doom	Hall of Fame	
Steve Peterson	Champions, Hero System, and Fuzion		
John R. Phythyon Jr.	Heaven & Earth, Ghost Dog, and Twilight of Atlantis		
Jon Pickens	Dungeon Master Guide 2nd edition, Player's Handbook 2nd edition, Monstrous Manual, Arms and Equipment Guide, Night of the Seven Swords, The Assassin's Knot, and The Lost Caverns of Tsojcanth		
Mike Pohjola	Myrskyn aika, Star Wreck Roleplaying Game, and Age of the Tempest		
Michael Pondsmith	Cyberpunk, Castle Falkenstein, Mekton, and Teenagers from Outer Space	Hall of Fame	
Michael Pondsmith	Cyberpunk, Castle Falkenstein, Mekton, and Teenagers from Outer Space	Diana Jones Award	
Greg Porter	TimeLords, CORPS, EABA, Macho Women with Guns, Hero System Almanac 1, More Guns!, Warp World, and Guns! Guns! Guns!		
Chris Pramas	Nocturnals: A Midnight Companion, Denizens of Freeport, The Apocalypse Stone, Death in Freeport, Ork! The Roleplaying Game, Star Trek: The Next Generation Role-playing Game, The Vortex of Madness and Other Planar Perils, Dangerous Prey, The Dying of the Light, Guide to Hell, The Apocalypse Stone, The Dying of the Light, and Warhammer Fantasy Roleplay 2nd edition		
Anthony Pryor	Creative Campaigning, Lankhmar – City of Adventure, Asticlian Gambit, Dune Trader, Patriots of Ulek, Rary the Traitor, and The Neo-Anarchist's Guide to North America		
David L. Pulver	Centauri Knights, Transhuman Space, Centauri Knights, Big Eyes, Small Mouth 2nd edition, Ghost Dog: The Way of the Samurai, Tenchi Muyo!, Demon City Shinjuku Role-Playing Game, The Dominion Tank Police Role-Playing Game, GURPS Bio-Tech, GURPS Technomancer, GURPS Mecha, GURPS Reign of Steel, GURPS Robots, The Complete Druid's Handbook, Indiana Jones and the Rising Sun, GURPS Vehicles, GURPS Cyberpunk Adventures, GURPS Psionics, GURPS Ultra-Tech 2nd edition, The Glory of Rome, and Big Eyes, Small Mouth 2nd edition		
Sean Punch	GURPS Fantasy Folk 2nd edition, GURPS Undead, GURPS Lite, GURPS Powers, and GURPS Martial Arts		
Jean Rabe	Child's Play, Vale of the Mage, Swamplight, Krynnspace, The Dawning of a New Age, The Jungles of Chult, Krynnspace, Tales of the Lance, Monstrous Compendium volume 2, Lords of Darkness, The Official RPGA Tournament Handbook, and Inside Ravens Bluff, The Living City		
Merle M. Rasmussen	Quagmire!, Lathan's Gold, Ghost of Lion Castle, Midnight on Dagger Alley, The Savage Coast, and Top Secret 2nd edition		
John D. Rateliff	Return to the Keep on the Borderlands, Reverse Dungeon, Hero Builder's Guidebook, and The Standing Stone		
A. Mark Ratner	Space Opera and Ground & Air Equipment		
Philip Reed	The Book of Unusual Treasures		
Paul Reiche III	Gamma World Referee's Screen and Mini-Module, Legion of Gold		
Thomas M. Reid	Mysteries of the Moonsea, Champions of Valor, Star Wars Roleplaying Game, The Wheel of Time Roleplaying Game, The Shining South, Eye of Doom, and Eye of Pain		
Mark Rein-Hagen	Ars Magica, Vampire: The Masquerade, and World of Darkness		
Sean K. Reynolds	Ghostwalk, Living Greyhawk Gazetteer, Forgotten Realms Campaign Setting, and Savage Species		
Andrew Rilstone	The Dying of the Light		
David J. Ritchie	City of the Gods, The Shattered Statue, Adventures in Blackmoor, Night of the Seven Swords, and Temple of the Frog		
Alex Roberts	Star Crossed and For the Queen	Diana Jones Award	
Ken Rolston	Wraith: The Oblivion, Dorastor: Land of Doom, Shadows on the Borderland, River of Cradles, The Northern Reaches, The Best of Intentions, Acute Paranoia, HIL Sector Blues, Orcbusters, Black Sword, Stealer of Souls, Conan Against Darkness!, and The Lost Island of Castanamir		
Benjamin Rosenbaum	Dream Askew, Dream Apart	ENNIE Award	
Aaron S. Rosenberg	Smuggler's Guide to the Rim, Warhammer Fantasy Roleplay, Supernatural Role Playing Game, Races of Destiny, World's Largest Dungeon, Trojan War: Roleplaying in the Age of Homeric Adventure, The Dying Earth Roleplaying Game, Asylum, Deryni Adventure Game, and Hong Kong Action Theatre!		
S. John Ross	Uresia: Grave of Heaven, Risus, Star Trek Roleplaying Game, GURPS Russia, GURPS Black Ops, GURPS Warehouse 23, In Nomine Game Master Pack, and GURPS Grimoire		
Marcus L. Rowland	Queen Victoria & The Holy Grail, Nightmare in Norway, The Great Old Ones, and Blood Brothers	Origins Awards	
Charles Ryan	Ultramodern Firearms, Earthforce Sourcebook, and Millenium's End		
Kenneth St. Andre	Tunnels & Trolls, Starfaring, and Monsters! Monsters!	Hall of Fame	
R. A. Salvatore	Menzoberranzan, The Accursed Tower, and Hall of Heroes		
Carl Sargent	From the Ashes, Top Ballista, Queen's Harvest, The Complete Thief's Handbook, The Shadow Elves, Tome of Magic, London Sourcebook, Five Shall Be One, Monster Mythology, From the Ashes, Tir na nOg, Paranormal Animals of Europe, The Marklands, The City of Skulls, Denizens of Earthdawn Volume One, Sky Point & Vivane, Plundered Vaults, and For Faerie, Queen & Country		
R. Hyrum Savage	Diomin		
Steven Schend	City of Splendors, Undermountain: Maddgoth's Castle, Drizzt Do'Urden's Guide to the Underdark, and Foes of Freedom		
Lawrence Schick	White Plume Mountain and Realms of Horror		
F. Wesley Schneider	Complete Scoundrel, Journeys through the Radiant Citadel, and Pathfinder Roleplaying Game	ENNIE Awards	
Robert J. Schwalb	Grimm, The Black Company, Elder Evils, A Song of Ice and Fire Roleplaying, Fiendish Codex II: Tyrants of the Nine Hells, Tome of Magic 3rd edition, The Black Company, World's Largest Dungeon, The Book of Fiends, Pirate's Guide to Freeport, Children of the Horned Rat, and Player's Handbook 3	ENNIE Awards (8)	
Jesse Scoble	El-Hazard Role-Playing Game and Silver Age Sentinels		
Curtis M. Scott	Sea of Fallen Stars, Pirates of the Fallen Stars, and GURPS Humanx		
Stephan Michael Sechi	The Compleat Alchemist, The Compleat Adventurer, The Compleat Spell Caster, The Bestiary, The Arcanum, The Lexicon, and Talislanta		
Chris Seeman	The Lord of the Rings Roleplaying Game		
Mike Selinker	Marvel Super Heroes Adventure Game, Book of Challenges, and Masters of the Wild		
Matthew Sernett	Monster Manual III, Races of Eberron, and Fiend Folio		
Owen Seyler	Aria: Canticle of the Monomyth, The Lord of the Rings Roleplaying Game, Star Trek Roleplaying Game Narrator's Guide, Star Trek Roleplaying Game: Player's Guide, Dune: Chronicles of the Imperium, and Aria Worlds		
Jeeyon Shim	Field Guide to Memory	Diana Jones Emerging Designer	
Jeeyon Shim	Field Guide to Memory	IndieCade Award	
Eric N. Shook	The Forgotten Temple of Tharizdun		
Kevin Siembieda	Palladium Fantasy Role-Playing Game, The Mechanoid Invasion, Heroes Unlimited, Robotech, and Rifts	Hall of Fame	
Edward E. Simbalist	Space Opera and Chivalry & Sorcery		
Ethan Skemp	Werewolf: The Apocalypse, Werewolf: The Wild West, Werewolf: The Forsaken, Changeling: The Lost, Geist: The Sin-Eaters, and Ghouls: Fatal Addiction		
Bill Slavicsek	Torg, Star Wars Roleplaying Game, Alternity, and The Nightmare Lands		
Carl Smith	Sandman: Map of Halaal, The Shady Dragon Inn, Village of Twilight, and The Forest Oracle		
Lester W. Smith	Traveller: 2300, Dark Conspiracy, Dungeon World, and Planes of Chaos		
Mark Smith	Talisman of Death, Sword of the Samura, and Way of the Tiger		
John Snead	Exalted, Trinity, and Star Trek: The Role Playing Game		
Richard Snider	Adventures in Fantasy, Powers & Perils, and Thieves' World 3rd edition		
Ree Soesbee	The Way of the Phoenix, The Way of the Wolf, and Celtic Age: Roleplaying the Myths, Heroes, and Monsters of the Celts	Origins Award	
Jared Sorensen	InSpectres and Lacuna	Indie RPG Awards	
Lucien Soulban	Heaven & Earth, Demon: The Fallen, Target: Wastelands, Veil of Night, Horrors of the Z'Bri, Guildbook: Haunters, and Constantinople by Night		
Warren Spector	Send in the Clones, GURPS Basic Set 3rd edition, Top Secret/S.I. 3rd edition, Adventure Pack I, and Citybook III: Deadly Nightside	,	
Garry Spiegle	Death's Ride and The Kidnapping of Princess Arelina		
Matthew Sprange	Lone Wolf Multiplayer Game Book, The Judge Dredd Roleplaying Game, and Seas of Blood		
Michael A. Stackpole	Mercenaries, Spies and Private Eyes; Citybook I: Butcher, Baker, Candlestick Maker; City of Terrors; Sewers of Oblivion; Stormhaven; The Adventure of the Jade Jaguar; Citybook II: Port o' Call; Citybook III: Deadly Nightside; Lords of Darkness; Sprawl Sites; and Citybook V: Sideshow	Hall of Fame	
Greg Stafford	Glorantha, RuneQuest, Prince Valiant: The Story-Telling Game, The Pendragon Campaign; and Pendragon	Hall of Fame	
Greg Stafford	Glorantha, RuneQuest, Prince Valiant: The Story-Telling Game, The Pendragon Campaign; and Pendragon	Diana Jones Award	
Stan!	Bastion of Broken Souls, Book of Challenges, Dragonlance Classics, Marvel Super Heroes Adventure Game, and The Bestiary		
Ed Stark	MasterBook, Legends of the Hero-Kings, Complete Warrior, Barrow of the Forgotten King, Fantastic Locations: City of Peril, and Complete Champion		
Lisa J. Steele	Bubblegumshoe, Medieval France, and GURPS Mysteries	ENNIE Award	
Owen K.C. Stephens	Star Wars Roleplaying Game Revised Core Rulebook, Starfinder Roleplaying Game, Pathfinder Roleplaying Game, and The Wheel of Time Roleplaying Game		
Lisa Stevens	Vampire: The Masquerade, Faeries, and The Succubus Club	Hall of Fame	
Greg Stolze	Usagi Yojimbo RPG, Unknown Armies, Godlike, and Delta Green		
CA Suleiman	Heroes of Horror, Mummy: The Resurrection, Vampire: The Requiem, Mummy: The Curse, and Egyptian Adventures: Hamunaptra		
Rick Swan	Nightmare Keep, Dragon Magic, and Ronin Challenge		
Brennan Taylor	How We Came To Live Here		
Paul Tevis	A Penny for My Thoughts	Indie RPG Award	
Gary L. Thomas	The Book of Lairs II, Monstrous Compendium, and The Shadow Elves		
Chris Thomasson	Fiend Folio and The Avatar's Handbook		
Lee Thommock (aka Lee Hammock)	Farscape and Dawning Star		
Howard Thompson	Treasure of Unicorn Gold and Treasure of the Silver Dragon		
Jonathan M. Thompson	Prime Directive		
Rodney Thompson	Dark Sun 4th edition, Star Wars Roleplaying Game: Saga Edition, Stargate SG-1, and D20 Future		
Jamie Thomson	Talisman of Death and Sword of the Samurai		
Jeff Tidball	Dragon Age Set 2		
Mike Tinney	Vampire: The Requiem, Aberrant, Hunter: The Reckoning, Rage: Warriors of the Apocalypse, and Street Fighter: The Storytelling Game		
Adam Tinworth	Werewolf: The Forsaken, Dark Ages: Inquisitor, Dark Ages: Vampire, Demon: The Fallen, Exalted Storyteller's Companion, Veil of Night, and The Walking Dead (Hunter: The Reckoning)		
Richard Tucholka	Fringeworthy, Bureau 13, and FTL:2448		
Don Turnbull	Fiend Folio and The Final Enemy	Hall of Fame	
Ray Turney	RuneQuest 2nd edition and RuneQuest Monsters		
Jonathan Tweet	Ars Magica, Over the Edge, Everway, Creative Campaigning, Houses of Hermes, and Dungeons & Dragons 3rd edition	Hall of Fame	
John Scott Tynes	Call of Cthulhu, Three Days to Kill, Puppetland, Puppetland/Powerkill, Mortal Coils, Unknown Armies, Delta Green, The Golden Dawn, Marked for Death, and Stranger Than Truth!: Further Adventures in Tabloid World		
Chad Underkoffler	Truth & Justice, Dead Inside, Swashbucklers of the 7 Skies, and The Zorcerer of Zo	Indie RPG Awards	
Chad Underkoffler	Truth & Justice, Dead Inside, Swashbucklers of the 7 Skies, and The Zorcerer of Zo	ENNIE Award (2)	
Monica Valentinelli	Hunter: The Vigil 2nd edition		
Susan Van Camp	Dragon Storm		
Allen Varney	Paranoia, Necromancer, and Send in the Clones		
George Vasilakos	All Flesh Must Be Eaten		
Greg A. Vaughan	The Twilight Tomb, Drow of the Underdark, and Anauroch: The Empire of Shade		
Travis Vengroff	Liberty: A.F.T.E.R		
Anne Vétillard	Premières légendes: Légendes de la Table Ronde and La Dame Noire		
Martin Wallace	Age of Steam	Hall of Fame	
James Wallis	The Extraordinary Adventures of Baron Munchausen		
James M. Ward	Gamma World, Metamorphosis Alpha, Deities & Demigods, Dungeon World, Greyhawk Adventures, Ruins of Adventure, The Book of Lairs, and Gods, Demi-Gods & Heroes	Hall of Fame	
Ross Watson	Rogue Trader, Dark Heresy, and Deathwatch		
Darren Watts	Champions Universe		
Frederick Weining	Dungeons & Dragons Gazetteer and Living Greyhawk Gazetteer		
Steve Wieck	Mage: The Ascension, Shadowrun, and Exalted		
Stewart Wieck	Mage: The Ascension and World of Darkness		
Margaret Weis	Dragonlance Campaign Setting, Dragonlance Adventures, and Tales of the Lance		
Jordan Weisman	Traveller		
Jean Wells	Palace of the Silver Princess and The Rogues Gallery		
Chuck Wendig	Hunter: The Vigil		
Lawrence Whitaker	Basic Role-Playing		
John Wick	Legend of the Five Rings, Orkworld, Houses of the Blooded, The Way of the Phoenix, and 7th Sea	ENNIE Award (5)	
Steve Wieck	Exalted and Mage: The Ascension		
Stewart Wieck	Mage: The Ascension 2nd edition and Hunter: The Reckoning	Origins Award	
Chris Wiese	Fading Suns and Dark Between the Stars		
J. D. Wiker	Sandstorm, Star Wars Roleplaying Game, D20 Future, D20 Menace Manual, The New Jedi Order Sourcebook, The Dark Side Sourcebook, and Star Wars Gamemaster Screen		
Skip Williams	Races of the Wild, Draconomicon, Book of Challenges, Deities & Demigods, Deep Horizon, Forgotten Realms Campaign Setting, Tome and Blood, Star Wars Roleplaying Game, Heroes of Steel, The Rod of Seven Parts, Dungeon Master Option: High-Level Campaigns, Player's Option: Combat & Tactics, Greyhawk Adventures, Vengeance of Alphaks, and Inside Ravens Bluff, The Living City		
Walter Jon Williams	Privateers and Gentlemen		
Lynn Willis	RuneQuest, Call of Cthulhu, Masks of Nyarlathotep, Elric!, Stormbringer, and Ghostbusters		
Kevin Wilson	7th Sea, Spycraft, Spycraft 2nd edition, Wonders Out of Time, Shadowforce Archer, Stargate SG-1, 7th Sea Game Master's Guide, and 7th Sea Players' Guide	Origins Award	
Kevin Wilson	7th Sea, Spycraft, Spycraft 2nd edition, Wonders Out of Time, Shadowforce Archer, Stargate SG-1, 7th Sea Game Master's Guide, and 7th Sea Players' Guide	ENNIE Award (2)	
Ray Winninger	Batman Role-Playing Game, Underground, Adventure Pack I, Tales of the Outer Planes, Castle Greyhawk, The Nile Empire, Come on Down!!, Who's Who in the DC Universe 1 and 3, Streets Tell Stories, and The Price of Freedom		
Steve Winter	The Complete Psionics Handbook, Lords of Madness, Ruins of Adventure, Monster Manual II, Hollow Earth Expedition, and Monstrous Compendium Dragonlance Appendix		
Loren Wiseman	GURPS Traveller, Twilight: 2000, Traveller, and Going Home	Hall of Fame	
Teeuwynn Woodruff	D6 Fantasy, Axis Mundi: The Book of Spirits, Horrors, Mage: The Ascension 2nd edition, Van Richten's Guide to Fiends, Galitia Citybook, Van Richten's Guide to the Created, Werewolf: The Apocalypse 2nd edition, Wraith: The Oblivion, Caerns: Places of Power, and The Werewolf Players Guide		
Erick Wujcik	Amber Diceless Roleplaying Game, Palladium Fantasy Role-Playing Game, Rifts, Teenage Mutant Ninja Turtles & Other Strangeness, After the Bomb, Ninjas & Superspies, and Paranoia	Hall of Fame	
James Wyatt	Monsters of Faerûn, The Speaker in Dreams, Defenders of the Faith,Oriental Adventures, Sharn: City of Towers, d20 Past, Eberron Campaign Setting, Player's Guide to Faerûn, Arms and Equipment Guide, Book of Exalted Deeds, Draconomicon, Fiend Folio, City of the Spider Queen, Deities & Demigods, and Horrors of the Z'Bri		
Mike Young	Rules to Live By LARP		

== See also ==
- History of games
- List of game designers
- List of indie game developers
- List of role-playing game artists
- List of tabletop role-playing games
