= Sandy Antunes =

American astronomer and game designer

- Born: Alexander Antunes; April 7, 1967 (age 59); Baltimore, Maryland, U.S.
- Education: Boston University College of Arts and Sciences; Pennsylvania State University; George Mason University
- Scientific career
- Fields: Astronomy

Alexander "Sandy" Antunes, (born 4 April 1967 in Baltimore, Maryland) is a Maryland-area astronomer, author, and role playing game designer. He graduated from Boston University in 1989 with a dual major in astronomy and physics, received a master's degree in astronomy from Penn State in 1992, and received his PhD in computational astrophysics from George Mason University in 2005. He is an associate professor of Astronautical Engineering at Capitol Technology University.

== Astronomy ==
Antunes has been published in numerous journal articles, including Science. In his work for NASA, he designed the mission-scheduling software used for XTE, Astro-E2, and Swift missions. He was the science scheduler for the NASA/ISAS ASCA mission from 1992 to 1994.

Antunes is currently working on Project Calliope, a pico-satellite designed to convert space sensor data to music. Additionally, he has authored four books for O'Reilly Media: DIY Satellite Platforms, Surviving Orbit the DIY Way. DIY Instruments for Amateur Space and has recently completed the fourth book in the series: DIY Comms and Control for Amateur Space. He was featured on Episode 10, "Space Invaders," of "The Big Picture with Kal Penn" in May 2015, launching a high-altitude balloon with his students and explaining what it takes to get into space.

== Gaming ==
Antunes has been active in the gaming community since 1992. With his wife, Emma, he founded the industry-focused role-playing game website RPGnet in 1996. He has published a monthly column on the business side of gaming since the site's inception. One early column, "The 1K Company" (RPGnet, 1998), continues to receive comments and citations.

Antunes's notable works include Miskatonic University, a supplement for Call of Cthulhu; Rules to Live By (a LARP rule book); Priceless, published by Rogue Publishing; and the Origins Award-nominated Faery's Tale.

He was chief editor on the Origins Award-nominated Metagame Magazine for its mass market run, 1997–1999. He was executive director of the GPA for 2000 and 2002.

Antunes and Mike Young ran the Cthulhu Live demos at the 1996 Gen Con game convention.

In recent years he has been exploring games that can be played by parents and children, children's games, and family games.
