= Tales of the Lance =

Role-playing game boxed set

- Genre: Role-playing game
- Publisher: TSR, Inc.
- Publication date: 1992
- Media type: Print

Tales of the Lance is a boxed set issued by TSR for Dragonlance. It includes maps, source books, and player stat cards for various non-player characters (NPCs).

== Contents ==
The Tales of the Lance boxed set summarizes the history of the setting, and details key locales in a thick volume that serves as a resource for Ansalon. A set of character cards provides comprehensive statistics for Flint Fireforge, Theros Ironfeld, and other iconic Dragonlance characters. A four-panel Dungeon Master's screen includes tables for subjects ranging from terrain obstacles to animal movement rates.

== Publication history ==
Tales of the Lance was designed by Harold Johnson, John Terra, J. Robert King, Wolfgang Baur, Colin McComb, Jean Rabe, and Norm Ritchie. It was published by TSR, Inc.

== Reception ==
Rick Swan reviewed Tales of the Lance for Dragon magazine #188 (December 1992). Swan contends that as a multiple-author setting, "Krynn has acquired some excess baggage over the years", but that the Tales of the Lance boxed set "sets the Dragonlance saga straight, addressing the discrepancies". He also points out that, "Since much of this material is recycled, Dragonlance saga fans who've been with the project since the beginning may not find enough to spark their interest (though if they pass, they'll miss the most lavish product in the series). But if you're thoroughly confused, or if you've been wondering what all the fuss is about, Tales of the Lance answers your questions and furnishes all the information you need to begin your own adventures.

== Reviews ==
- Casus Belli #72
- Coleção Dragon Slayer
- Dragão Brasil #19
