= Tales of the Outer Planes =

Dungeons & Dragons adventure module

- Code: OP1
- TSR product code: 9225
- Rules required: AD&D
- Character levels: 1 - 11+
- Campaign setting: Generic AD&D
- Authors: Deborah A. Christian, Vince Garcia, Thomas M. Kane, David and Martha Ladyman, Christopher Mortika, John Nephew, Bruce Nesmith, Bill Slavicsek, Rick Swan, John Terra, Ray Winninger
- First published: 1988

Linked modules
- OP1

Tales of the Outer Planes is an adventure module for the Dungeons & Dragons fantasy role-playing game, set in that game's Outer Planes. TSR, Inc. published the module in 1988 for the Advanced Dungeons & Dragons rules. The module is a collection of adventures designed by Deborah A. Christian, Vince Garcia, Thomas M. Kane, David and Martha Ladyman, Christopher Mortika, John Nephew, Bruce Nesmith, Bill Slavicsek, Rick Swan, John Terra, and Ray Winninger. Its cover art is by Jeff Easley. Its interior art is by Chris Miller and Jeff Easley, and cartography by Dave LaForce.

== Plot summary ==
Tales of the Outer Planes contains eleven short adventure scenarios set on other planes including the Ethereal, the four Elemental planes, the Astral plane, and the Abyss.

The module provides pre-generated mini-adventures to introduce player characters to extra-planar worlds either as stand-alone campaigns or part of on-going campaigns. There are 11 adventures in the outer realms and 17 lair adventures that focus on creatures from an outer plane.

=== Table of contents ===
Chapter	Page	Levels
How to Use Tales of the Outer Planes	2	
Prime: A Simple Deed, Well Rewarded	4	1-2
Ethereal: Castle at the Edge of Time	12	2
Air: The Brewing Storm	18	3-4
Water: The Voyage of the Nereid	24	3-4
Fire: Through the Fire	30	5-6
Earth: The Missing Kristal	36	(unstated)
Astral: Into the Astral Plane	42	7-8
Seven Heavens: An Element of Chaos	48	7-8
Olympus: A Friendly Wager	56	9-10
The Abyss: The Sea of Screams	64	9-10
Nine Hells: To Hell and Back	72	11+
Lairs	80	various

== Publication history ==
OP1 Tales of the Outer Planes was edited by Gary L. Thomas, with art by Jeff Easley, and was published by TSR in 1988 as a 96-page book.

Design: Deborah A. Christian, Vince Garcia, Thomas M. Kane, David and Martha Ladyman, Christopher Mortika, John Nephew, Bruce Nesmith, Bill Slavicsek, Rick Swan, John Terra, Ray Winninger
Coordinators: Bruce Heard, Karen S. Boomgarden
Editor: Gary L. Thomas
Cover Art: Jeff Easley
Illustrations: Chris Miller, Jeff Easley
Cartography: David S. LaForce
Typesetting: Betty Elmore, Kim Janke

Distributed to the book trade in the United States by Random House, Inc., and in Canada by Random House of Canada, Ltd. Distributed to the toy and hobby trade by regional distributors. Distributed in the United Kingdom by TSR UK Ltd.

product number 9225
ISBN 0-88038-544-8

== See also ==
- List of Dungeons & Dragons modules
