= Champions of Valor =

Role-playing game sourcebook

- Champions of Valor book cover
- Author: Thomas M. Reid and Sean K. Reynolds
- Genre: Role-playing games
- Publisher: Wizards of the Coast
- Publication date: November 2005
- Media type: Hardcover

Champions of Valor is a hardcover sourcebook for use with the 3.5 edition of the fantasy role-playing game Dungeons & Dragons.

== Contents ==
Champions of Valor is an expansion to detail the role of good in the Forgotten Realms setting.

== Publication history ==
Champions of Valor was published in November 2005, and was designed by Thomas M. Reid and Sean K. Reynolds. Cover art was by Tomás Giorello, with interior art by Kalman Andrasofszky, Wayne England, Jason Engle, Ralph Horsley, Jeremy Jarvis, Warren Mahy, William O'Connor, Lucio Parrillo, Wayne Reynolds, and Francis Tsai.

Sean K. Reynolds explains how this book relates to its companion volume, Champions of Ruin: "We were given a rough draft of Champions of Ruin while working on this book (CoR wasn't quite finished when we were writing CoV) and our outline included a similar structure with opposite intent. There's an entire chapter on good organizations, another on NPCs (intended as allies and support characters for valorous PCs, including some who are suitable as variant paladin special mounts or "animal" companions), the role of atoning for misdeeds, and so on."
