= A World of Darkness =

Tabletop role-playing game supplement

- Cover art for the first edition, by Clark Mitchell
- Designers: Steve Crow, Graeme Davis, Frank Frey, Lee Gold, Andrew Greenberg, Robert Hatch, and Ryan O'Rourke
- Illustrators: John Cobb, Samuel Inabinet, Larry MacDougall, Chris McDonough, Jon Skolund, Joshua Gabriel Timbrook, and Clark Mitchell
- Publishers: White Wolf Publishing
- Publication: 1992 (ed. 1); 1996 (ed. 2)
- Genres: Tabletop role-playing game supplement
- Series: World of Darkness
- ISBN: 1-56504-019-8 (ed. 1): 1-56504-207-7 (ed. 2)

A World of Darkness is a tabletop role-playing game supplement released by White Wolf Publishing in 1992 for the games in their World of Darkness series, including Vampire: The Masquerade.

== Contents ==
Although the title suggests the book will be about White Wolf's entire World of Darkness setting — which at the time consisted of Vampire: The Masquerade and Werewolf: The Apocalypse — the book only focuses on vampires. The book describes mysteries and secrets of the vampire world found in various regions, including the British Isles, Europe, Jordan, Hong Kong and Haiti. The book also describes a vampire club in San Francisco.

The second edition, although greatly expanded, also focuses only on vampires, but covers more geographical areas, adding North, Central and South America, the entire Caribbean, the entire Middle East, Egypt, Africa and Australia.

== Publication history ==
White Wolf Publications published Vampire: The Masquerade in 1991. This was followed in 1992 by the supplement A World of Darkness, a 136-page softcover book designed by Steve Crow, Graeme Davis, Frank Frey, Lee Gold, Andrew Greenberg, Robert Hatch, and Ryan O'Rourke, with interior art by John Cobb, Samuel Inabinet, Larry MacDougall, Chris McDonough, Jon Skolund, and Joshua Gabriel Timbrook, and cover art by Clark Mitchell.

In 1996, White Wolf published a second edition, a 158-page softcover book designed by Mark Cenczyk, Ben Chessell, Richard Dansky, Graeme Davis, James Estes, Alex Hammond, Angel Leigh McCoy, Deena C. McKinney, James A. Moore, Lucien Soulban, and Richard Watts, with interior art by Jason Brubaker, Michael Gaydos, Pia Guerra, Anthony Hightower, Eric Lacombe, Larry MacDougall, Heather J. McKinney-Chernik, E. Allen Smith, and Ron Spencer, and cover art by John Matson.

== Reception ==
Reception
Review scores
Source	Rating
Arcane	8/10 (ed. 2)
Dragon	(ed. 2)
Magia i Miecz	135/200 (ed. 2)

Nicholas Demidoff of Saga called the first edition a "brilliant work"; his only caveat was that he wished the book had been longer.

Steve Crow reviewed A World of Darkness in White Wolf #33 (Sept./Oct., 1992), rating it a 2 out of 5 and stated that "While all of the information in A World of Darkness is useful, I have to give it a 2, simply because it is too heavily Vampire-related when it claims to be representative of something greater. Hopefully, future books in this series will be delayed until the other 'spokes' of the Storyteller System can be dealt with more evenly."

Mark Barter of Arcane reviewed the second edition and found it to be "a first class sourcebook which opens up a whole world of fresh challenges for players and Storytellers."

Rick Swan of Dragon reviewed the second edition, and disliked the "inconsistent format", using as one example that the chapters on Europe and the Middle East had adventure ideas, but the chapters on North and South America did not. He also disparaged the lack of an index or a comprehensive table of contents, meaning that "locating specific information is a pain." Nonetheless, he called A World of Darkness "a good place to begin your tour [of] the most richly imagined world in all of role-playing." He concluded by giving the book an above average rating of 5 out of 6, saying "Because A World of Darkness functions as sort of a Kindred almanac, it’s essential reading."

== Reviews ==
- Vaux, Rob (1996). "A World of Darkness, 2nd Edition". Shadis. No. 29. Alderac Entertainment Group. p. 88.
- Colin, Fabrice; Lhomme, Tristan (April 1996). "Vampire : La gamme aux dents longues" [Vampire: A thirsty and ambitious line-up of games]. Casus Belli (in French). No. 93. Excelsior Publications. pp. 36–38.
- Casus Belli #98
