= City of Splendors: Waterdeep =

Role-playing game supplement

- Genre: Role-playing game
- Publisher: Wizards of the Coast
- Publication date: July 2005
- Media type: Print
- ISBN: 0-7869-3693-2

City of Splendors: Waterdeep is a supplement to the 3.5 edition of the Dungeons & Dragons role-playing game.

== Contents ==
City of Splendors: Waterdeep is an accessory for the Forgotten Realms that details the city of Waterdeep, including a history of the city, detailed city maps, descriptions of key locations, game statistics for important NPCs, information on local laws, and rules for running and playing in adventures in Waterdeep.

== Publication history ==
City of Splendors: Waterdeep was written by Eric L. Boyd, and published in July 2005. Cover art was by Scott M. Fischer, with interior art by Steve Belledin, Steve Ellis, Wayne England, Ralph Horsley, William O'Connor, Lucio Parrillo, Vinod Rams, and Rick Sardinha.
