= Aria Worlds =

Role-playing game supplement

Aria Worlds is a supplement published by Last Unicorn Games in 1994 for use with the role-playing game Aria: Canticle of the Monomyth.

== Publication history ==
In 1994, Last Unicorn Games published a 500-page role-playing system called Aria: Canticle of the Monomyth (also known as Aria Roleplaying. Rather than creating individual characters like most role-playing games, players in Aria could create and role-play entire societies, anything from a village to a kingdom. The same year, Last Unicorn Games also published Aria Worlds, a sourcebook describing how to create realistic settings for the game.

== Description ==
Aria Worlds is a 304-page softcover book designed by Christian Scott Moore and Owen Seyler, and edited by Kirsten Kaschock and Jesse Fure, with cover art by Michael Willam Kaluta. The book describes how to create realistic settings for Aria in almost any era from the Stone Age to the early Renaissance, in terms of environment, economy and laws. Chapter headings include Technology and Innovation, and Politics and Kinship. The book concludes with nine sample societies.

== Reception ==
In the February 1995 edition of Dragon (Issue #214), Rick Swan thought the book was an "inspired effort, marred only by stuffy writing". He concluded by giving it a top rating of 6 out of 6, saying, "game designers, amateur and pro alike, should find it an indispensable reference, regardless of the [game] systems they prefer."

In the December 1996 edition of Arcane (Issue 14), Andrew Rilstone was dismissive of the previously published Aria: Canticle of the Monomyth, calling it "unplayable." But Rilstone found that although Aria: Worlds "suffers from the same problem of over-writing as the roleplaying book, ... it also contains more solid examples and a fair amount of information not easily obtainable elsewhere - the brief history of technology in the appendix, for example, would be a useful resource for most world-builders." Rilstone concluded with a recommendation, saying, "If you are at all interested in the idea of interactive history, then Aria: Worlds should be your first purchase."

Shannon Appelcline, in the 2014 book Designers & Dragons: The '90s, commented that "Aria was a massive undertaking released as two volumes, Aria Worlds (1994) and Aria Roleplaying (1994). It grew from a concept of creating societies for game worlds and evolved into a game system containing some of the most innovative ideas found in 20 years of game design."

== Reviews ==
- Shadis #18 (Feb., 1995)
- Pyramid V1, #13 (May/June, 1995)
