= Freedom Fighters (role-playing game) =

1986 near-future role-playing game

Cover art by William H. Keith Jr.

Freedom Fighters is a near-future role-playing game published by Fantasy Games Unlimited FGU in 1986 in which American guerrillas form a resistance against invaders.

== Description ==
Freedom Fighters posits that someone such as the Soviet Union or an alien force has successfully invaded the United States. The players control characters who are guerrilla fighters.

The game comes as a boxed set that contains "The Character", an 80-page book that explains character generation and the game rules for characters; "The Resistance", a 96-page book with rules for combat; a 32-page book containing character generation tables and character sheets; "The Errant Knight", an 8-page sample scenario; a gamemaster's screen, and dice.

== Publication history ==
Freedom Fighters was designed by J. Andrew Keith, with art by William H. Keith Jr., and was published in 1986 by FGU. However, FGU was in financial trouble by this time, and Freedom Fighters would be its second-last publication.

== Reception ==
In his 1990 book The Complete Guide to Role-Playing Games, game critic Rick Swan thought that the character generation process was covered "in excruciating detail, with over thirty pages and dozens of charts devoted to every conceivable physical, mental and attitudinal characteristic ... Needless to say, a lot of this is unnecessary and much of it isn't particularly meaningful." Swan also found the game mechanics similarly complicated. Although Swan found that time spent wading through the rules would produce "surprisingly realistic results", he concluded by giving the game a rating of 2.5 out of 4, saying, "This is humorless, difficult material that would have benefited from a sharper focus and a skeptical editor with a big red pencil."
