= Krynnspace =

1993 role-playing game supplement by Jean Rabe

- Cover art by David O. Miller
- Author: Jean Rabe
- Language: English
- Published: 1993

Krynnspace (product code SJR7) is a supplement published by TSR in 1993 for the fantasy role-playing game Dungeons & Dragons that is a crossover between the Spelljammer and Dragonlance campaign settings.

== Description ==
Krynnspace describes the star system of Krynn, the planet central to the Dragonlance setting, in terms of Spelljammer space travel. The book takes the reader on a guided tour of the entire system. A short introduction gives a quick overview of the system. The book then describes each body within Krynnspace:

- The Sun, the battleground for a war between creatures from the plane of fire, and the sun's inhabitants, the Helions.
- Sirion, a planet of fire
- Reorx, inhabitable, and mainly a place of mines
- Krynn, the setting for Dragonlance
- Chislev, covered by jungles
- Zivilyn, a gas giant that has giant floating continents and twelve inhabitable moons
- Nehzmyth, a giant swamp
- The Star Islands, five tropical asteroids linked by magical bridges
- The Dark Clouds, a mysterious and terrifying nebula

The book also introduces several notable Spelljammers who ply their trade amongst the planets, and a basic overview of the gods who have an effect on this setting.

== Publication history ==
In 1984, TSR released the Dragonlance campaign setting for Advanced Dungeons & Dragons. Five years later, TSR introduced Spelljammer, a campaign setting with a fantasy space environment.

In the early 1990s, TSR decided to combine Spelljammer with three of their most popular campaign settings. In 1991, TSR published Realmspace, which described the world of the Forgotten Realms in terms of Spelljammer. The following year, TSR gave the same treatment to the world of Greyhawk in Greyspace. In 1993, TSR released Krynnspace, which added the Spelljammer element to the world of Dragonlance. This 96-page softcover book with a color postcard enclosed was designed by Jean Rabe, with cartography by Newton Ewell, interior art by David C. Sutherland III and David O. Miller, and cover art by Miller.

== Reception ==
Paul Westermeyer, writing for the website Spelljammer: Beyond the Moon, thought this product contained minimally more interesting non-player characters and locations than either of its predecessors Realmspace or Greyspace, but noted that Krynnspace had "no Dragonlance flavor nor any real Spelljammer flavor."
