= Target: Wastelands =

Role-playing game supplement

Target: Wastelands is a 2001 role-playing game supplement published by FanPro for Shadowrun.

== Contents ==
Target: Wastelands is a supplement in which hostile environments are detailed as well as how to survive in them.

== Reviews ==
- Pyramid
- Envoyer
- Envoyer
