= Denizens of Freeport =

Role-playing game supplement

Denizens of Freeport is a 2003 role-playing game supplement for d20 System published by Green Ronin Publishing.

== Contents ==
Denizens of Freeport is a supplement in which a roster of more than sixty non-player characters complete with personalities, portraits, hooks, and stats, and offers a rogue's gallery of villains, allies, and locals.

== Reviews ==
- Pyramid
- Fictional Reality (Issue 11 - Mar 2003)
- d20Zine #4 (March, 2003)
- Legions Realm Monthly (Issue 15)
