= The Book of Mirrors: Mage Storytellers Handbook =

Role-playing game supplement

- Publisher: White Wolf Publishing
- Publication date: 1997

The Book of Mirrors: Mage Storytellers Handbook is a 1998 role-playing game supplement published by White Wolf Publishing for Mage: The Ascension.

== Plot summary ==
The Book of Mirrors is a supplement which serves as a gamemaster's aid.

== Reviews ==
- Envoyer #23 (Sep 1998)
- Envoyer #25 (as "Das Buch der Spiegel")
- Backstab #4
- Casus Belli V1 #107 (Jul-Aug 1997) p. 16
- Dosdediez V2 #7 (Dec 1998) p. 16
- Ringbote (Issue 13 - Jul/Aug 1997)
