= Nocturnals: A Midnight Companion =

Role-playing game supplement

- Publisher: Green Ronin Publishing
- Publication date: 2004

Nocturnals: A Midnight Companion is a 2004 role-playing game supplement published by Green Ronin Publishing for Mutants & Masterminds.

== Contents ==
Nocturnals: A Midnight Companion is a supplement in which a setting book based on the Nocturnals comic series offers details on the characters and guidance for blending horror and heroism in games.

== Reviews ==
- Pyramid
- Backstab
- Fictional Reality (Issue 16 - Jun 2004)

== Reception ==
Nocturnals: A Midnight Companion was the Gold winner for "Best Art, Interior", "Best Graphic Design and Layout", and "Best Licensed Product" at the 2004 ENNIE Awards.
