= Reverse Dungeon =

Dungeons & Dragons adventure module

- Authors: John D. Rateliff and Bruce R. Cordell
- First published: 2000

Reverse Dungeon is an adventure module for the 2nd edition of the Advanced Dungeons & Dragons fantasy role-playing game.

== Plot summary ==
Reverse Dungeon is an adventure in which the players control the monsters in a dungeon instead of playing as a group of adventurers. The players start by playing as a small goblin tribe, then progress through an assortment of different monsters, and end the adventure by playing undead creatures. Both the Introduction and the "Appendix: Playing the Bad Guys" section caution that this is beyond normal role-playing experiences, and explores the idea that some of the monsters may just be merely misunderstood rather than evil.

== Publication history ==
Reverse Dungeon was published by Wizards of the Coast, and written by John D. Rateliff and Bruce R. Cordell.

== Reception ==
Reverse Dungeon was reviewed by the online version of Pyramid on July 7, 2000. The reviewer cautioned: "This is not your normal adventure. Instead of playing a stalwart group of adventurers, valiantly fighting the forces of darkness, the players take on the challenge of playing those forces and deciding for themselves if they are truly that dark." Praising the adventure, the reviewer said that "Reverse Dungeon is a well thought-out scenario that challenges players to step away from their normal ideas and take a significantly different view of the world around them." The reviewer commended the designers as well, saying that "John Rateliff and Bruce Cordell present an interesting role-playing challenge to both player and DM."

== Reviews ==
- Envoyer (German) (Issue 46 - Aug 2000)
- Realms of Fantasy
