= Virtual Realities =

Role-playing game supplement

Virtual Realities is a 1991 role-playing supplement for Shadowrun published by FASA.

== Contents ==
Virtual Realities is a supplement in which cyberdecking rules are provided for use with the Matrix.

== Reception ==
Matthew Gabbert reviewed Virtual Realities in White Wolf #29 (Oct./Nov., 1991), rating it a 3 out of 5 and stated that "If deckers aren't your favorite flavor of archetype, this sourcebook might change your mind. If you already feel the call of cyberspace, then slot a copy of Virtual Realities today."

== Reviews ==
- Dragon #187 (Nov., 1992)
- The Shadowrun Supplemental (Vol 1, Issue 1 - 1997)
- Saga (Issue 9 - Sep 1991)
