= The Adventure of the Jade Jaguar =

Role-playing game adventure

The Adventure of the Jade Jaguar is an adventure published by Flying Buffalo in 1983 for the modern-day role-playing game Mercenaries, Spies and Private Eyes.

== Publication history ==
Flying Buffalo's original plan for Mercenaries, Spies and Private Eyes (MSPE) was to publish it as a boxed set that would include a rulebook for the role-playing game setting, and a separate short teaching supplement, The Adventure of the Jade Jaguar. However, they eventually decided to release the MPSE rulebook on its own as a single unboxed book. Although The Adventure of the Jade Jaguar was very short, having been written merely as a teaching adventure, it was released as the first MPSE adventure.

== Plot summary ==
The Adventure of the Jade Jaguar is a solitaire adventure where a single player character must foil the villainous Jade Jaguar, who has formed a fighting force from the natives, and taken explorer Professor Jackson as a prisoner along with her colleagues.

== Reception ==
William Peschel reviewed Adventure of the Jade Jaguar for Fantasy Gamer magazine and stated that "You have to run through the adventure several times to get a good play value, Fortunately, there are a number of surprises that made rereading it a pleasure. It just may not be everyone's cup of tea."

Nick Davison reviewed Jade Jaguar for Imagine magazine, and stated that "This is a very shallow module, which cannot be enjoyed for much longer than an hour."

In the May 1984 edition of White Dwarf (Issue #49), Jon Sutherland was very critical of both the adventure and the MPSE system, giving the adventure a very poor overall rating of 3 out of 10, and stating that it "Sounds a bit like a second rate Tarzan script, read on if you can stifle the yawns. A poor introduction to a dull RPG."

In the February 1985 edition of Dragon (Issue #94), Arlen Walker pointed out that if players new to the MPSE system used it "As a teaching tool, it succeeds because it demonstrates the use of many of the rules and also allows you to try both violent and problem-solving approaches to the game." But as a stand-alone adventure, Walker found "it isn't that absorbing", and that it was far too short: "The first time I played this adventure, I was in and out successfully in a matter of ten minutes or less. While some subsequent runs lasted much longer, ten minutes proved to be about the average time for any adventure." In conclusion, he did not recommend this adventure for players already familiar with the MPSE system, "however, if you’re just now buying the game [MPSE], the extra $4.95 to acquire this teaching tool would be well spent."
