= Axis Mundi: The Book of Spirits =

Role-playing game supplement

- Author: Emrey Barnes, Phil Brucato, Bill Bridges, Brian Campbell, Jackie Cassada, Ben Chessell, Heather Curatola, Harry Heckel, Chris Howard, James A. Moore, Rustin Quaide, Teeuwynn Woodruff
- Illustrator: Ron Brown, Mike Chaney, Matt Milberger, Jim Daly, Richard Kane Ferguson, Brian LeBlanc, Shea Anton Pensa, Steve Prescott, Dan Smith, Ron Spencer
- Series: Werewolf: The Apocalypse
- Genre: Horror
- Publisher: White Wolf Publishing
- Publication date: 1995
- Media type: Softcover
- Pages: 158

Axis Mundi: The Book of Spirits is a supplement published by White Wolf Publishing in 1995 for the horror role-playing game Werewolf: The Apocalypse.

== Contents ==
Axis Mundi: The Book of Spirits is an expansion to the rules of the role-playing game Werewolf: The Apocalypse. Topics covered include Axis Mundi (the World Tree), where werewolves must gather for their rituals; and the many spirits that werewolves are likely to encounter — elementals, enigmatics, epiphlings, naturae, and tribal totems.

== Description ==
The 158-page softcover book was written by Emrey Barnes, Phil Brucato, Bill Bridges, Brian Campbell, Jackie Cassada, Ben Chessell, Heather Curatola, Harry Heckel, Chris Howard, James A. Moore, Rustin Quaide, and Teeuwynn Woodruff. Interior art was by Ron Brown, Mike Chaney, Matt Milberger, Jim Daly, Richard Kane Ferguson, Brian LeBlanc, Shea Anton Pensa, Steve Prescott, Dan Smith, and Ron Spencer.

== Reception ==
In the July 1996 edition of Arcane, Mark Barter commented that "Despite the odd quibble, the occasional purple prose and the annoying lack of an index - I recommend this to provide an extra dimension to all Werewolf campaigns." Barter gave Axis Mundi: The Book of Spirits an above average rating of 8 out of 10 overall.

In the July–August 1996 edition of Casus Belli, Tristan Lhomme thought the book was useful, saying, "There are some 'failures' of course, as in all collective works with many authors, but overall, it's very well done, and perfectly fascinating." Lhomme did find the amount of material almost overwhelming. "The extent of information is such that you will need two or three readings to get through it." He concluded by wondering if this book was necessary for new Storytellers. "Axis Mundi is strongly recommended for veteran Storytellers [...] Others can do without it in good conscience, at least for their first games."

== Reviews ==
- Envoyer #36 (Oct 2000)
