= The Contract Directory =

Role-playing game supplement

- Publisher: Hogshead Publishing
- Publication date: 2001
- ISBN: 1899749292

The Contract Directory is a 2001 role-playing game supplement published by Hogshead Publishing for SLA Industries.

== Contents ==
The Contract Directory is a supplement in which the Contract Circuit is detailed along with the Contract Killers who fight there.

== Publication history ==
Shannon Appelcline noted that shortly after Hogshead took over distribution on Warpstone in 1999, "Hogshead began publishing SLA Industries books created by Nightfall Games - a fellow UK game publisher. This resulted in the appearance of a new edition of the SLA Industries rulebook (2000) and two original supplements: The Key of Delhyread (2001) and The Contract Directory (2001)."

== Reviews ==
- Pyramid
- Backstab
- Rebel Times #7
