= Guide to the Sabbat =

Role-playing game supplement

- Publisher: White Wolf Publishing
- Publication date: 1999

Guide to the Sabbat is a 1999 role-playing game supplement published by White Wolf Publishing for Vampire: The Masquerade.

== Contents ==
Guide to the Sabbat is a supplement which details the group known as the Sabbat.

== Reviews ==
- InQuest #50
- Backstab #14
- SF Site
- Casus Belli V1 #119 (Apr-May 1999) p. 72
- Realms of Fantasy 08/1999 p. 84-85
- Player.it
- Dragão Brasil #47 (Feb 1999) p. 6
- Dragão Brasil #79 (Oct 2001) p. 10-12
- DXP #2 (Apr 2000) p. 2
- Dosdediez V2 #9 (May 1999) p. 22
- Dosdediez V2 #13 (Apr 2000) p. 23
