= The Way of D'era: The Romulan Star Empire =

Role-playing game supplement

The Way of D'era: The Romulan Star Empire is a 1999 role-playing game supplement published by Last Unicorn Games for Star Trek: The Next Generation Role-playing Game.

== Contents ==
The Way of D'era: The Romulan Star Empire is a supplement in which a comprehensive boxed set details Romulan history, politics, culture, character creation, and adventures, complete with new ships, templates, and reference posters.

== Reviews ==
- Pyramid
- Casus Belli #122
