= Mortal Coils (Call of Cthulhu) =

1998 Call of Cthulhu adventure

Mortal Coils is a 1998 role-playing game adventure published by Pagan Publishing for Call of Cthulhu.

== Plot summary ==
Mortal Coils is an adventure in which an anthology of adventures take place from 1900 to 1929.

== Publication history ==
Shannon Appelcline explained that after publishing Delta Green, "over the next few years, Pagan published a few more well-regarded supplements - The Realm of Shadows (1997) and Mortal Coils (1998) - and the penultimate original issue of The Unspeakable Oath. They maintained their creative peak's high standards for artwork and layout and they investigated new eras, from the 1900s to the 1940s." Appelcline also noted that "John H. Crowe III, one of the most prolific authors at Pagan, published his last book, Mortal Coils in 1998. For the next decade, he remained involved only as a member of the editorial staff."

== Reviews ==
- Pyramid
- Backstab
