= Paranormal Animals of Europe =

Role-playing game supplement

Paranormal Animals of Europe is a 1993 role-playing game supplement published by FASA for Shadowrun.

== Contents ==
Paranormal Animals of Europe is a supplement in which a field guide catalogs the strange, fearsome, and newly awakened magical creatures that roam the Europe of 2054.

== Reviews ==
- Australian Realms #11
- Backstab #8 (as "Metacréatures Europeennes")
- The Shadowrun Supplemental (Vol 1, Issue 1 - 1997)
- Challenge (Issue 73)
- Roleplayer Independent (Volume 1, Issue 7 - Jun 1993)
