= Pandemonium (role-playing game) =

Comedy role-playing game

- Pandemonium! Adventures in Tabloid World
- Designers: Stephan Michael Sechi
- Publishers: MIB Productions, Inc.
- Publication: 1993
- Genres: Comedy
- Systems: custom

Pandemonium is a comedy role-playing game designed by Stephan Michael Sechi and published by MIB Productions, Inc. It is inspired by the fictional "news" that appears in tabloid publications such as the Weekly World News.

== Setting ==
Pandemonium's campaign setting is a fictionalized version of Earth that the game refers to as Tabloid World. In Tabloid World, all of the unlikely events described in tabloids are true, although most of the public does not believe so. (For example, Elvis Presley is alive, aliens abduct people on a regular basis, and the Bermuda Triangle hides the lost continent of Atlantis.) People who know the truth about Tabloid World are referred to as Enlightened.

Player characters in Pandemonium are Paranormal Investigators (P.I.s), Enlightened individuals who have left their regular jobs (or Mundane Professions) to research unusual phenomena for the fictional newspaper Weekly Weird News. Their adventures typically involve investigating sightings of tabloid staples like Elvis and Bigfoot in order to uncover larger mysteries and conspiracies.

== System ==
Pandemonium's rules are divided into two groups. The E-Z Rules are a minimal ruleset intended for beginning players, and assume players use pregenerated characters included in the rulebook. The Very Complicated Rules allow player-generated customized characters and include more detailed rules for combat and other tasks.

Pandemonium characters have three Attributes (Body, Mind, and Spirit), which are described as bonuses to action rolls. For example, a Body score of "+1" gives the character a one point bonus to die rolls involving physical activities. Characters also have skills which provide adjustments to action rolls. Skills may derive from characters' Mundane Professions, Hobbies, or Paranormal Talents.

Character actions in Pandemonium are resolved by rolling a ten-sided die, adding the relevant Attribute or skill bonus, and subtracting situational modifiers (if the Very Complicated Rules are being used). If the adjusted result (the Action Sum) is six or higher, the character succeeds in the action. The Action Sum is then compared to the Fate Table to determine the degree of success. Players may improve their rolls by spending their characters' Instant Karma Points, which are earned in a manner similar to experience points in other games.

One of Pandemonium's most distinctive rules involves past lives. In keeping with the game's tabloid theme, all P.I.s are reincarnations of historical figures such as Joan of Arc or Albert Einstein, who have skills and abilities far superior to a typical character's (a notable exception is Elvis Presley, who in the game's world is still alive). If a P.I. successfully recalls a past life (through a successful action roll), the P.I. assumes the past life's personality and skills for ten minutes.

The gamemaster in Pandemonium is called The Editor.

== History ==
The game's core book, Pandemonium! (subtitled Adventures in Tabloid World) is a 176-page softcover manual written by Stephan Michael Sechi, Robin Laws, and Joel Kaye. It was published in 1993 by MIB Productions, Inc. and distributed by Atlas Games. Pandemonium was the first role-playing game inspired by tabloid newspapers, predating the Amazing Engine-based Tabloid! by one year.

MIB Productions and Atlas Games released only one accessory for Pandemonium. Stranger Than Truth (subtitled Further Adventures in Tabloid World) is a 96-page collection of adventures written by Rob Heinsoo, Robin Laws, and John Scott Tynes, published in 1994.

In the summer of 1996, Atlas Games publicly admitted that Pandemonium had "not found a solid market niche", and reduced its overstock by giving away copies of both products (Varney 1996).

== Reception ==
Mark Jason Durall reviewed Pandemonium! in White Wolf #46 (Aug., 1994), rating it a 3.5 out of 5 and stated that "This book book contains everything needed for a tabloid world campaign. At [the price], another adventure or two would be welcome."
