= The Castle Guide =

Dungeons & Dragons rule book

- Author: Grant Boucher, Troy Christensen, Arthur Collins, and Nigel Findley, with Timothy B. Brown and William W. Connors
- Genre: Role-playing game
- Publisher: TSR
- Publication date: 1990
- Pages: 128

The Castle Guide is a supplemental rulebook published in 1990 for the 2nd edition of the Advanced Dungeons & Dragons fantasy role-playing game.

== Contents ==
The Castle Guide is a rules supplement intended for the 2nd edition Dungeon Master's Guide which covers life in feudal lands, and how to build, run, siege, and defend castles. Reviewer Keith H. Eisenbeis stated that it "contains all types of useful and needed information about almost every aspect of castle existence from construction to destruction". The Castle Guide describes three ordinary types of castles, as well as 12 special castles geared towards specific types of AD&D characters such as thieves, wizards, dwarves, and orcs.

== Publication history ==
DMGR2 The Castle Guide was written by Grant Boucher, Troy Christensen, Arthur Collins, and Nigel Findley, with Timothy B. Brown and William W. Connors, and was published by TSR in 1990 as a 128-page book.

== Reception ==
In the July 1990 edition of Games International (Issue 16), the reviewer was very positive about this product, saying that it provided "a fairly detailed feudal medieval background [...] What a shame that AD&D is so ill-suited to such a game... Still worth getting for the background material."

Keith Eisenbeis reviewed the manual in the June–July 1991 issue of White Wolf. He noted its comprehensiveness and quality, stating that "it successfully balances the reality of a historical medieval castle with all the fantasy elements of an AD&D campaign world. The Castle Guide is a must for any feudal, medieval or Arthurian type campaign". He rated it overall at a 4 out of 5 possible points, qualifying it as a "very good product".

== Other reviews ==
- Casus Belli #63
