= Apocrypha Now =

Role-playing game supplement

- Publishers: Hogshead Publishing
- Publication: 1995
- Genres: Role-playing
- Parent games: Warhammer Fantasy Roleplay
- ISBN: 9781899749034

Apocrypha Now is a 1995 role-playing game supplement for Warhammer Fantasy Roleplay published by Hogshead Publishing.

== Contents ==
Apocrypha Now is a supplement that compiles material from earlier issues of White Dwarf and first edition Warhammer Fantasy Roleplay supplements.

== Reception ==
Steve Faragher reviewed Apocrypha Now for Arcane magazine, rating it a 7 out of 10 overall. Faragher comments that "If I have a criticism, it's that not much of the material strikes me as very original. It's vital for all WFRP referees, though."
