= The Neo-Anarchist's Guide to North America =

Role-playing game supplement

The Neo-Anarchist's Guide to North America is a 1990 role-playing supplement for Shadowrun published by FASA.

== Contents ==
The Neo-Anarchist's Guide to North America is a supplement in which the focus is the nations and significant cities in the part of North America that is not Amerindian.

== Reception ==
Matthew Gabbert reviewed Neo-Anarchist's Guide to North America in White Wolf #28 (Aug./Sept., 1991), rating it a 4 out of 5 and stated that "The Seattle Metroplex of 2050 can be a pretty exciting and profitable place for most shadowrunners, but for those who desire a change of scenery (or who just need to get out of town for a while), the Neo-Anarchist's Guide to North America could be just the ticket."

== Reviews ==
- Challenge #50 (May/June, 1991)
