= Elevator to the Netherworld: The Inner Kingdom Sourcebook =

Role-playing game supplement

Elevator to the Netherworld: The Inner Kingdom Sourcebook is a 2000 role-playing game supplement published by Atlas Games for Feng Shui.

== Contents ==
Elevator to the Netherworld is a supplement in which time periods of the Inner Kingdom that characters travel to are detailed.

== Reviews ==
- Pyramid
- Backstab (as "Ascenseur pour Ailleurs")
