= Thief's Challenge =

D&D module and supplement

- Code: HHQ3
- Authors: Troy Christensen
- First published: 1993

Thief's Challenge is an adventure for the 2nd edition of the Advanced Dungeons & Dragons fantasy role-playing game, published in 1993.

== Contents ==
The Thief's Challenge is a single player module for thief characters that are between levels 1 and 4.

== Publication history ==
The module was written by Troy Christensen and published by TSR.

== Reception ==
John Setzer reviewed Thief's Challenge in a 1994 issue of White Wolf. On a scale of 1 to 5, he rated the module a 3 for Appearance, Concepts, Complexity, and Playability and a 2 for Value. He stated, "With a down-to-earth plot and little powerful magic, Thief’s Challenge provides an entertaining, everyday human adventure," while adding that "Extensive unused space and fairly large type make this module seem incomplete. Whatever was cut from this product shouldn't have been; there's plenty of room for more." Overall, Setzer rated it a 2.5 out of 5.
