= The Book of Fiends =

Tabletop role-playing game supplement

- Publisher: Green Ronin Publishing
- Publication date: 2003

The Book of Fiends is a 2003 supplement for d20 System role-playing games published by Green Ronin Publishing.

== Contents ==
The Book of Fiends is a supplement in which demons and devils are detailed.

== Reception ==
The Book of Fiends won the Silver for "Best Revision, Update or Compilation" at the 2004 ENnie Awards.

== Reviews ==
- Backstab #48
- Black Gate
- Fictional Reality (Issue 16 - Jun 2004)
- Pyramid
