= Robot Warriors =

Tabletop science fiction mecha role-playing game

Robot Warriors is a science fiction mecha role-playing game published by Hero Games and Iron Crown Enterprises (ICE) in 1986.

== Description ==
Robot Warriors is a role-playing game where characters pilot giant robots into combat using a system of rules based on Hero Games's Hero System first used in the superhero role-playing game Champions.

Players design giant robots use a variable number of Construction Points that can be used to purchase various systems as well as mass. Each robot might also end up with one or more Disadvantages during construction such as Limited Turning Radius.

Each player also creates a pilot character and chooses a number of skills for the pilot such as Electronics and Weapon Familiarity.

Other rules cover robot battle and personal combat. The game includes guidelines for campaigns, how the technology works, sample robots and characters, and an introductory scenario.

== Publication history ==
By 1986, Hero Games was having financial difficulties, and Iron Crown Enterprises (ICE) stepped in to help with production. Robot Warriors, a 160-page book, was designed by Steve Perrin and George MacDonald, with illustrations by Jim Holloway and Jason Waltrip, and was published in 1986 by Hero Games and ICE.

Hero Games/ICE published one supplement for the game, Robot Gladiators (1988), a 32-page booklet that described a campaign set in a sports arena where giant robots competed.

Robot Warriors failed to find an audience and was rapidly discontinued. Game historian Shannon Appelcline pointed out that Robot Warriors "had no chance against FASA's Battletech and Palladium's Robotech, both released around the same time."

== Reception ==
In his 1990 book The Complete Guide to Role-Playing Games, game critic Rick Swan commented, "As giant robot games go, Robot Warrior is about as good as it gets." Swan admitted that the game "boils down to a bunch of giant robots pounding each other into scrap metal. There's not much in the way of subtlety, but it's quick, clean, and reasonably entertaining." Swan thought that although "role-playing opportunities would seem to be limited", he felt that the introductory scenario was "imaginative." Swan concluded by giving this game a solid rating of 3 out of 4, saying, ""Like all games of this genre, Robot Warriors doesn't have much to offer hardcore role-players, but for those who enjoy a good demolition derby, it's hard to beat."

== Reviews ==
- Comics Feature #56
