= Denizens of Earthdawn Volume One =

Tabletop fantasy role-playing game supplement

Denizens of Earthdawn
- Cover art by Janet Aulisio
- Designers: Louis Prosperi; Tom Dowd; Marc Gascoigne; Shane Lacy Hensley; Sean R. Rhoades; Carl Sargent; John Terra
- Publishers: FASA
- Publication: 1994; 31 years ago
- Genres: Fantasy

Denizens of Earthdawn Volume One is a supplement published by FASA in 1994 for the fantasy role-playing game Earthdawn.

== Contents ==
Denizens of Earthdawn describes four of the eight races of Barsaive, the campaign world of Earthdawn: T'Skrang, Humans, Elves, and Windlings.

The first part of the book provides descriptions of the races through accounts by fictional scholars. Each provides a summary of each race's history, culture, customs, art and crafts as well as its particular traits. The second part provides game statistics, disciplines, talents, and rules specific to each race.

The book includes 16 pages of color art illustrating the races and examples of their cultures.

== Publication history ==
FASA published the fantasy role-playing game Earthdawn in 1993, and followed up with supplements and adventures. One of the supplements was Denizens of Earthdawn Volume One, designed by Louis Prosperi, Tom Dowd, Marc Gascoigne, Shane Lacy Hensley, Sean R. Rhoades, Carl Sargent, and John Terra, with cover art by Janet Aulisio, and interior art by Aulisio, Thomas M. Baxa, Joel Biske, Steve Bryant, Liz Danforth, Earl Geier, Jeff Laubenstein, Darrell Midgette, Jim Nelson, Mike Nielsen, and Anthony Szczudlo. The 128-page book was published by FASA in 1994, along with Denizens of Earthdawn Volume Two.

== Reception ==
In Issue 18 of Australian Realms, Malcolm Adler called this "a fantastic compilation of essays." Adler's only complaint was the formatting of the book, noting, "the one column format of the text can make it an awkward read." Adler concluded, "If you are playing Earthdawn this product is a must."

In Issue 68 of the French games magazine Casus Belli, Croc called the book "a journey into a thrilling world rich in legends ... Everything gives a strong impression of realism and coherence." Croc concluded with a strong recommendation, writing, "Buy this without hesitation.

In Issue 223 of Dragon, Rick Swan called the book "beautifully written and illustrated." Swan was impressed by the level of detail, calling it "meticulous, mind-boggling detail, the kind you expect from Ph.D. candidates working on their dissertations." Swan's only complaint was that all eight of the races should have been gathered into one large book rather than two volumes.

== See also ==
- Other Earthdawn publications
