= Citybook V: Sideshow =

Role-playing game supplement

Citybook V: Sideshow is a 1991 role-playing supplement published by Flying Buffalo.

== Contents ==
Citybook V: Sideshow is a supplement in which 19 different businesses are described for the quarter of the city inhabited by non-humans.

== Publication history ==
Citybook V: Sideshow is part of the Catalyst fantasy supplement series.

== Reception ==
Christopher Earley reviewed Citybook V: Sideshow in White Wolf #30 (Feb., 1992), rating it a 4 out of 5; it stated that "At any rate, Citybook V: Sideshow is both a coherent product as a whole, and easily torn apart for use in a broad cross-section of FRPG campaigns."

== Reviews ==
- The Game Oracle (Issue 10)
