= Citybook III: Deadly Nightside =

1987 role-playing game supplement

Citybook III: Deadly Nightside is a universal role-playing game supplement published by Flying Buffalo and distributed by Task Force Games in 1987.

== Contents ==
Like previous books in the Citybook series, this book details prototypical medieval urban businesses that can be used by referees to flesh out a fantasy role-playing adventure or campaign. This book deals with the seamier side of the city. As critic Steve Jones noted, "Book III concentrates on the dirty side of town, where even the muggers will not go without a bodyguard."

Eighteen businesses are described, such as a temple, a slave-trading market, a drug den, a brothel, a court of law, a club for gambling, and a school which trains fighters. Each includes detailed floor plans, notable personalities associated with it, and assorted story hooks that can draw characters into an adventure.

== Publication history ==
Citybook III: Deadly Nightside is a 96-page softcover book. It is part of Flying Buffalo's Catalyst series of universal role-playing game supplements that can be adapted to any role-playing game system. It was edited by Michael A. Stackpole, with contributions by Greg Gorden, Warren Spector, Allen Varney, Scott Haring, Jennell Jaquays, (Note: Credited as Paul Jaquays.) Jennifer Roberson, Dennis L. McKiernan, and Ed Andrews, and artwork by Liz Danforth.

Flying Buffalo had ceased most of its role-playing publications in 1985, but had continued to provide Task Force Games with materials to be distributed under license, including Citybook III: Deadly Nightside. As Shannon Applecline commented in the 2014 book Dungeons & Designers: The '70s, "The Catalyst line was given much more attention by Flying Buffalo, even when it was licensed out. Task Force Games reprinted several out-of-print books while Flying Buffalo prepared new releases for them including Grimtooth's Traps Fore (1986), Citybook III: Deadly Nightshade (1987), a new comic book-based Catalyst series called Lejentia Campaigns (1989), and Grimtooth's Traps Ate (1990)."

== Reception ==
In the January 1988 edition of Dragon (Issue 129), Ken Rolston called this "another volume in the excellent Citybook series of generic FRPG supplements featuring colorful urban establishments with richly imagined and illustrated NPCs and stimulating scenarios." He concluded, "Previous Citybook projects have always been original, offbeat, and well-written; Citybook III is no exception."

In the October 1988 edition of Games International, Steve G. Jones reviewed the first three volumes of the Citybook series, and found that although this book covers some of the darker professions in the city, "It is not all bad, as adventurers can learn to fight at the Bloodmoon School and experience the justice of Nightside Inferior Court, before tangling with the real menaces like The Steel man assassins and the Yellow Poppy drug den." Although Jones found the material fairly dry, "The blandness of the setting makes it easy to slip into any existing campaign, while most of the characters and scenario ideas are original in spite of this." Jones didn't like that "each and every organisation has a Dark Secret. If the players find that every time they try to buy a loaf of bread the bakers are summoning the Elder Gods in the basement, the game could be getting out of hand. I would suggest downplaying this aspect for most of the places the adventurers visit, so it remains a rare surprise when it does happen."
