= Most Wanted, Volume 1 =

Tabletop role-playing game supplement

Most Wanted, Volume 1 is a 1983 role-playing game supplement for Villains and Vigilantes published by Fantasy Games Unlimited.

== Contents ==
Most Wanted, Volume 1 is a collection of game statistics for 30 supervillains, as well as 100 counters.

== Reception ==
Steve Crow reviewed Most Wanted, Volume 1 in Space Gamer No. 70. Crow commented that "All in all, this book is a must for any V&V fan. Champions and Superworld referees might find it interesting for source material, but conversion is necessary. I consider it the most useful V&V supplement to date."

== Reviews ==
- Comics Feature #30
