= The Elfquest Companion =

Role-playing game supplment

The Elfquest Companion is a 1985 role-playing game supplement published by Chaosium for Elfquest.

== Contents ==
The Elfquest Companion is a supplement in which character options are expanded with statistics for 17 additional characters, complementing the 12 in the Elfbook. The supplement includes a rules errata sheet, articles on elfin names and physical appearance, and details on an alternative Wolfrider tribe, serving as an example for tribe creation. It also features a Wolf Ecology section to enhance gameplay for Wolfriders. Two mini-scenarios, "The Dying River" and "Fire Flight", provide new adventure opportunities. An introduction by Richard Pini emphasizes that the game's world does not need to strictly follow the comic, while an afterword by Steve Perrin offers guidance on integrating tribal characters into gameplay.

The Elfquest Companion includes an errata sheet for rules, statistics for characters from the Elfquest comics, Elven name data, insights into wolf ecology, and additional background information on Wolf Clan characters. The book also provides two short adventure scenarios: "Dying River" and "Fire Flight".

== Publication history ==
The Elfquest Companion was written by Elizabeth Cerritelli, Jeff Okamoto, Steve Perrin, Sandy Petersen, Richard Pini, Wendy Pini, and Carol Schultz, and was published by Chaosium in 1985 as a 40-page book.

The Elfquest Companion was the first supplement for Elfquest.

== Reception ==
Michael DeWolfe reviewed The Elfquest Companion for Different Worlds magazine and stated that "The Elfquest Companion is almost as good as its parent game and complements it."

== Reviews ==
- Casus Belli (Issue 30 - Jan 1986)
- Free INT (Issue 8 - Sep 1994)
