= The Dying of the Light (Warhammer Fantasy Roleplay) =

1995 tabletop fantasy role-playing game supplement

- Publishers: Hogshead Publishing
- Publication: 1995; 31 years ago
- Genres: Fantasy
- Systems: Custom / Percentile
- ISBN: 978-1899749041

The Dying of the Light is a 1995 role-playing game adventure for Warhammer Fantasy Roleplay published by Hogshead Publishing.

== Plot summary ==
The Dying of the Light is an adventure in which the player characters journey to Marienburg to obtain a book which their benefactor needs to study, but then they encounter the panic caused by the oncoming eclipse of the Chaos moon Morrslieb.

== Reception ==
David Comford reviewed The Dying of the Light for Arcane magazine, rating it an 8 out of 10 overall. Butcher comments that "The Dying of the Light is a fine offering from Hogshead Publishing. It might not break any new ground, but this adventure does offer hours of intense roleplaying."
