= Inside Ravens Bluff, The Living City =

Dungeons & Dragons adventure module

- Cover art by Kevin Ward
- Code: LC2
- Authors: RPGA Member submissions compiled by Jean Rabe
- First published: 1990

Linked modules
- Living City

Inside Ravens Bluff, The Living City is a supplement published by the RPGA in 1990 for their Living City shared campaign world set in the Forgotten Realms using the second edition of the fantasy role-playing game Advanced Dungeons & Dragons.

== Plot summary ==
Inside Ravens Bluff describes Jack Mooney and Sons Circus, a traveling troupe that crisscrosses the Forgotten Realms. Many of the notable people of the circus are described, and many of the shops in various cities that they visit are detailed.

== Publication history ==
RPGA was the tournament division of TSR, and had been quite popular in the early 1980s. By 1987, in the face of decreasing membership as D&D tournaments fell out of fashion, RPGA introduced a "shared" campaign setting called "Living City" that was set in the city of Ravens Bluff. RPGA members could submit their own material to be used by everyone. Some of these submissions were shared through a series of supplements; the second in the series was LC2 Inside Ravens Bluff, The Living City. Members' submissions were compiled into a 64-page softcover book by Jean Rabe, with cover art by Kevin Ward, interior art by Jim Holloway and cartography by Dave Conant. It was published by TSR under the RPGA imprint.

== Reception ==
In his 2023 book Monsters, Aliens, and Holes in the Ground, RPG historian Stu Horvath disparaged the cover art of the entire series of books, saying, "The covers are surprisingly second rate for what amounted to a new and exciting way to play D&D." Horvath specifically called out Kevin Ward's cover art of Inside Ravens Bluff, saying, "It's difficult to imagine Kevin Ward's bizarre cover art of a vagrant assaulting a minstrel ... inspiring any sales."
