= Book of Challenges =

Dungeons & Dragons rulebook

- Cover of Book of Challenges
- Author: Daniel Kaufman, Gwendolyn Kestrel, Mike Selinker, Skip Williams
- Genre: Role-playing game
- Publisher: Wizards of the Coast
- Publication date: June 2002
- Media type: Print (Trade Paperback)
- Pages: 128
- ISBN: 0-7869-2657-0
- Text: Book of Challenges online

Book of Challenges is a supplemental rulebook for the 3rd edition of the Dungeons & Dragons role-playing game that presents a number of ready-made dungeon encounters that a Dungeon Master can insert into a scenario.

== Contents ==
The encounters in the Book of Challenges include straightforward traps (such as a domed room with a hinged floor that serves as the hidden lair for a beholder). It also includes challenging logic puzzles, riddles and even role-playing encounters where combat or mechanics skills play a secondary role. All are categorized by challenge ratings (shortened as "CR") and run from CR 1 to CR 22. The book includes advice for DMs on constructing similar traps to the ones presented including tutorials on basic logic puzzles.

=== Description of sample traps ===
All of the Treasure, None of the Traps—A series of already-sprung traps in a spiral corridor that automatically reactivate once the players reach the center.

Fire and Water—A logic puzzle that connects the pulling of colored levers with musical tones to prevent the players from accidentally unleashing either lava or rushing water.

Curse of Iron—A magically locked door that bears a riddle, the solution to which is the only sure means of entry.

Medusa's Traveling Casino—Not a trap per se, but a series of gambling games meant to part the PCs and their gold. (the segment is rated at CR 12, only as the potential combat NPCs equal that.)

== Publication history ==
The book was published as a paperback edition by Wizards of the Coast in June 2002. Mike Selinker was the lead designer. It was authored by Daniel Kaufman, Gwendolyn F.M. Kestrel, Mike Selinker, and Skip Williams. Cover art was by Todd Lockwood, with interior art by David Day and Wayne Reynolds.

== Add-ons ==
The reviewer from Pyramid noted that for the Book of Challenges, Wizards of the Coast put up one preview encounter with a logic puzzle on its website, and provided two web enhancements dealing with useful equipment and scrolls used for gaining information in a dungeon, plus a bonus encounter for when a lone scout goes ethereal.

== Reception ==
James T. Voelpel of mania.com commented, "This new supplement has whatever a dungeon master needs to properly confound any adventuring party if you need an encounter on short notice. The book is 127 pages of black and white, however, and this is where a problem come into play. The artwork and maps are average at best, and although it is of a good length, the price ($21.95) is somewhat unreasonable for the format. If you are willing to fork over this somewhat large amount, the contents are a must-have for a veteran or rookie dungeon master."

== Reviews ==
- Coleção Dragão Brasil
- Fictional Reality (Issue 9 - Sep 2002)
- Realms of Fantasy
