= Creative Campaigning =

Role-playing game supplement

- Authors: Tony Pryor, Tony Herring, Jonathan Tweet, and Norm Ritchie
- Genre: Role-playing games
- Publisher: TSR
- Publication date: 1993
- ISBN: 978-1560765615

Creative Campaigning is a supplement for the 2nd edition of the Advanced Dungeons & Dragons fantasy role-playing game, published in 1993.

== Contents ==
Creative Campaigning is aimed at providing Dungeon Masters with fresh ideas for running their Dungeons & Dragons campaigns.

It includes chapters outlining novel campaign settings, adventure ideas, and new ways of using existing game materials.

== Publication history ==
The supplement is published by TSR. The authors are Tony Pryor, Tony Herring, Jonathan Tweet, and Norm Ritchie.

== Reception ==
Keith H. Eisenbeis reviewed the supplement in issue No. 38 of White Wolf magazine. He stated that "The idea behind this handbook has considerable merit, but the end result is lacking. ... While the product is well-intentioned, the information presented is so general, broad, or obvious as to render the book superfluous." Eisenbeis rated the supplement an overall 2 out of a possible 5.

== Reviews ==
- Casus Belli #74
