= Extreme Vengeance =

Tabletop role-playing game

- Publisher: Archangel Entertainment
- Publication date: 1997

Extreme Vengeance is a 1997 role-playing game published by Archangel Entertainment.

== Gameplay ==
Extreme Vengeance is a game in which over-the-top action movie tropes are featured. Players take on the roles of exaggerated action heroes, competing to perform the wildest stunts and rack up the highest body counts, all while the Director judges their cinematic flair. The system is intentionally simple, built around just two stats: Guts and Coincidence (Luck), with mechanics that reward dramatic flair and outrageous spectacle. Characters wield Repertoires like "Dramatic Slo-Mo" or "Catch Phrase" to shape scenes, and dice rolls determine not only success and damage but also Popularity rather than traditional experience points. The game encourages players to grandstand for audience approval, with Popularity boosting their toughness and elevating them to bigger fictional films. It includes escalating categories of firearms and a philosophy of "pull the trigger, people explode." Supporting characters are cannon fodder, and heroes walk away from explosions with barely a scratch. The rulebook is written in an irreverent style, full of movie references and humor, designed for fast-paced, high-energy sessions rather than deep campaigns.

== Reception ==
Mark Barter reviewed Extreme Vengeance for Arcane magazine, rating it a 7 out of 10 overall, and stated that "This is big, cheap, dumb fun designed for big, cheap dumb men and women. If you need to know any more, this ain't the game for you. Is it as good as Feng Shui? Well, no, but it is different. Definitely worth a look."

== Reviews ==
- Knights of the Dinner Table Magazine #10 (Aug., 1997)
- Fractal Spectrum (Issue 17 - Winter 1997)
- Pyramid (Issue 27 - Sep 1997)
