= World's Largest Dungeon =

Role-playing game supplement

The World's Largest Dungeon
- Publishers: Alderac Entertainment Group
- Genres: Fantasy
- Systems: d20 System
- Playing time: Varies
- Chance: Dice rolling
- Skills: Role-playing, improvisation, tactics, arithmetic

The World's Largest Dungeon is a Dungeons & Dragons adventure set entirely in an enormous dungeon. It is over 800 pages long and was produced by Alderac Entertainment Group in 2004. It also includes 16 full-color poster maps, making its single tome one of the largest campaign settings in one product.

The players cannot leave the dungeon the way they entered because the entrance uses a one-way wall of force effect. This means that all supplies must be taken into the dungeon with them. The campaign is designed to take four to six characters from first level to 20th or above over the course of two real-time years and at least a year of game time. The dungeon contains examples of every type of monster in the System Reference Document as well as a few new ones.

== Publication history ==
The World's Largest Dungeon was published in 2004 by Alderac Entertainment Group, and along with World's Largest City (2006), was one of the final d20 publications released by AEG. AEG advertised The World's Largest Dungeon as the largest sourcebook ever produced for d20, with 960,000 words and reprinting every monster found in the d20 SRD, on over 840 pages. AEG estimated that the book held enough material to be used in play for two years, and that was the largest role-playing game book ever produced at the time.

== Impact ==
The World's Largest Dungeon was parodied in Knights of the Dinner Table as the Biggest Damn Dungeon Ever which was a product by the fictional creators of Hackmaster, but unlike the World's Largest Dungeon, it was only an alphabetical collection of monsters.

In 2006, the Guinness Book of World Records listed World's Largest Dungeon as the most expensive roleplaying book to date at $99.95. It has since been eclipsed by several other books.

== Reception ==
The reviewer from the online second volume of Pyramid stated that "Alderac Entertainment Group's magnum opus, The World's Largest Dungeon, is nothing if not ambitious. An 800-page monster, it's the biggest game adventure ever published."

== Reviews ==
- Dragon Slayer
- Backstab #49
