= The Avatar's Handbook =

Role-playing game supplement

The Avatar's Handbook is a 2002 role-playing game supplement for d20 System published by Green Ronin Publishing.

== Contents ==
The Avatar's Handbook is a supplement in which a divine‑themed Master Class supplement introduces a new celestial‑summoning core class and supports it with feats, spells, magic items, templates, archangels, and dozens of Upper Planar creatures.

== Reviews ==
- Pyramid
- Fictional Reality (Issue 12 – Jun 2003)
- Legions Realm Monthly (Issue 10 – Jun 2003)
