= Burning Shaolin =

Role-play game supplement

Burning Shaolin is a 2001 role-playing game adventure published by Atlas Games for Feng Shui.

== Plot summary ==
Burning Shaolin is an adventure in which the player characters must save the Five Crippled Heroes who have been poisoned by the sorcerer Kan Kuei.

== Publication history ==
Shannon Appelcline noted that "Unlike many other d20 publishers, Atlas worked to spread that d20 success to their own core lines. They thus established a third d20 line called 'Coriolis' that published dual-statted books, each of which provided game info for both d20 and one of Atlas' existing games. These books included Burning Shaolin (2001) for Feng Shui, The Ascension of Magdalene (2002) for Unknown Armies, The Black Monks of Glastonbury (2002) for Ars Magica and Last Hero in Scandinavia (2003) for Rune."

== Reviews ==
- Pyramid
- Backstab
- Asgard (Issue 4 - Nov 2001)
