= The Northern Reaches =

Tabletop role-playing game supplement for Dungeons & Dragons

- Authors: Ken Rolston and Elizabeth Danforth
- Genre: Role-playing game
- Publisher: TSR
- Publication date: 1988

The Northern Reaches is an accessory for the Dungeons & Dragons fantasy role-playing game. The book describes the land known as the Northern Reaches, which lie on the eastern seaboard of the D&D game's Known World, also known as Mystara.

== Contents ==
The Northern Reaches features guides Helfdan Halftroll, Onund Tolundmire, Saru the Serpent, and Dwalinn the Dwarf who provide a tour of the land known as the Northern Reaches. The accessory details the Viking-style lands of Ostland, Vestland, and Soderfjord. The thirty-two page Players Book provides a description the lands of the Northern Reaches, and rules for characters from this region, while the sixty-four page DM Book contains the history of the lands and their nations, and provides three adventure scenarios, an epic campaign outline, and a system rune magic for clerics.

The gazetteer also includes a large color map and cardstock cutouts for constructing scale model Viking buildings. The complete 3-D card village once assembled is intended to be used as the setting for two of the adventures in the set.

== Publication history ==
GAZ7 The Northern Reaches was written by Ken Rolston and Elizabeth Danforth, with a cover by Clyde Caldwell and interior illustrations by Stephen Fabian, and was published by TSR in 1988 as a sixty-four page book, a thirty-two page book, four cardstock sheets, a large color map, and an outer folder.

== Reception ==
Jim Bambra reviewed The Northern Reaches for Dragon magazine No. 143 (March 1989). He said that the book "introduces these cultures in a highly entertaining and informative manner", concluding, "With its solid role-playing excitement and easy to digest background, this Gazetteer belongs in every D&D game collection."

Lawrence Schick, in his 1991 book Heroic Worlds, felt that the gazetteer gave "an excellent feel for what the Norsemen were really like".
