= World of Darkness: Mafia =

Role-playing game supplement

World of Darkness: Mafia is a 2002 role-playing game supplement published by White Wolf Publishing.

== Contents ==
World of Darkness: Mafia is a supplement in which mortal mobster characters are detailed.

== Reviews ==
- Pyramid
- Backstab #40 (Aug-Sep 2002) p. 72
- Dosdediez V2 #23 (Mar 2003) p. 22
- RPG Magazine #5 (Apr 2003) p. 6
