= Perilous Forest =

Role-playing game supplement

Perilous Forest is a 1992 role-playing supplement for Pendragon published by Chaosium.

== Contents ==
Perilous Forest is a supplement in which the West Cumbria region of Britain is explored.

== Reception ==
Chris Hind reviewed Perilous Forest in White Wolf #34 (Jan./Feb., 1993), rating it a 3 out of 5 and stated that "In the introduction, GMs receive an important warning: the 'Perilous Forest' is aptly named. Several sites therein are almost impossible for ordinary player knights to overcome. Players ignorant of the terms 'surrender,' 'flee' and 'failure' will become frustrated in spots. For these gamers, Perilous Forest may not be worth its weight in librum."
