= The Nightmare Lands =

Tabletop role-playing game supplement

- Genre: Role-playing games
- Publisher: TSR
- Publication date: 1995
- Media type: Boxed set

The Nightmare Lands is an accessory for the 2nd edition of the Advanced Dungeons & Dragons fantasy role-playing game, published in 1995.

== Contents ==
The Nightmare Lands is a supplement that details the mist-covered Nightmare Lands on the borders of Demiplane of Dread in the Ravenloft setting. In this netherworld the Nightmare Court searches for dreamers to trap them in "dreamscapes" which amplify where their secret feelings to unbearable levels so that the Court can feed on their fears. These dreamers are subjected to this mental assault nightly and soon go insane unless the Nightmare torturer is defeated.

The Nightmare Lands includes four books: "Book One: Journal of Doctor Illhousen", "Book Two: Rules of Dreams and Nightmares", "Book Three: Book of Nightmares" and the "Monstrous Supplement". The "Journal of Doctor Illhousen" explains Nightmare adventures to the players, and how characters can reach the Nightmare Lands - physically and as dream beings - to aid victims held by the Nightmare Court. The journal also notes the reality shifting nature of this world. The "Rules of Dreams and Nightmares" details the complexities involved in Nightmare adventures, as well as how characters can build their Mental Fortitude, or self-confidence in their "dreamself", by facing their worst nightmares which gives them the strength to break free of the influence of the Court. The "Book of Nightmares" and "Monstrous Supplement" can be combined together for an adventure scenario for characters in the Nightmare Lands.

== Publication history ==
The Nightmare Lands was designed by Shane Lacy Hensley with additional design and editing by Bill Slavicsek, and TSR, Inc. published the supplement in 1995. The box cover artist was Den Beauvais, and the book cover and interior artist was John Snyder.

== Reception ==
Trenton Webb reviewed The Nightmare Lands for Arcane magazine, rating it a 7 out of 10 overall. He refers to the "Journal of Doctor Illhousen" as "sketchy and theoretical", and felt that the "Book of Nightmares" and the "Monstrous Supplement" together "flesh out the Nightmare Lands into a truly horrific place to explore (and to DM)". He comments on the set as a whole: "The ideas behind the Nightmare Lands are intriguing and exciting. They provide an arena in which a party of any level can truly be tested." He felt that the appeal of the Nightmare Court was "limited by its inevitable association with the gothic Ravenloft", but that in this setting "it works well and all Ravenloft DMs should be encouraged to give their parties a bad night's sleep every once in a while". He cautions that the ready-to-run scenario Nightmares "may not sit readily with heroes from other places and planes in the multiverse". Webb outlines his concerns with the running of a Nightmare Lands campaign, where "the worst problems can arise. Mental Fortitude is a good system, but it requires better examples, better explanation and easy-access tables or checklists before it can function effectively. Further, the very plumed nature of Nightmare reality causes continued questions for the DM and impairs the necessary suspension of disbelief for the players." He concludes the review by saying: The Nightmare Lands is a brave attempt to add another element to D&D adventures. It conjures a scary new world where absolutely anything and everything can happen. It's a place I'd love to visit as a player - but I wouldn't want to live there."

== Reviews ==
- Dragon #227
