= Veil of Night =

Role-playing game supplement

Veil of Night is a 2001 role-playing game supplement published by White Wolf Publishing for Vampire: The Dark Ages.

== Contents ==
Veil of Night is a supplement in which the medieval Islamic part of the setting is explored.

== Reviews ==
- Pyramid
- Backstab
- Envoyer #55 (May 2001)
- Magia i Miecz #2001-05 p. 11
- D20 #1 p. 11-12
- D20 #6 p. 15
- D20 #7 p. 14
