= The Transylvania Chronicles =

1998 role-playing game adventure

- Publisher: White Wolf Publishing
- Publication date: 1998
- ISBN: 1-56504-290-5

The Transylvania Chronicles is a 4-book role playing game series published by White Wolf Publishing for Vampire: The Masquerade.

== Books in the series ==
- Transylvania Chronicles I: Dark Tides Rising
- Transylvania Chronicles II: Son of the Dragon
- Transylvania Chronicles III: Ill Omens
- Transylvania Chronicles IV: The Dragon Ascendant

== Plot summaries ==
Transylvania Chronicles I is an adventure which spans 800 years of history. Transylvania Chronicles II is an adventure in which the player characters must face Dracula.

== Reviews ==
- Envoyer
- Backstab #9
- Casus Belli #120
- Envoyer
- Backstab #12
