= Egyptian Adventures: Hamunaptra =

Role-playing game supplement

Egyptian Adventures: Hamunaptra is a 2004 role-playing game supplement for the d20 System published by Green Ronin Publishing.

== Contents ==
Egyptian Adventures: Hamunaptra is a supplement in which a boxed campaign setting inspired by Ancient Egypt presents three sourcebooks filled with reimagined races and classes, new feats, spells, magic, prestige classes, secret societies, monsters, and a fully detailed gazetteer of Khemti so players can explore a land of pharaohs, encroaching desert, political tension, and mythic adventure.

== Reviews ==
- Pyramid
- Backstab #51
- Fictional Reality (Issue 19 - Mar 2005)
