= The Succubus Club =

Role-playing game supplement

The Succubus Club is a 1991 role-playing supplement for Vampire: The Masquerade published by White Wolf Publishing.

== Contents ==
The Succubus Club is a supplement in which an exclusive club in Chicago is presented, where vampires are frequent guests.

== Reception ==
Stewart Wieck reviewed The Succubus Club in White Wolf #31 (May/June, 1992), rating it a 3 out of 5 and stated that "Overall, The Succubus Club works well. The adventures are a mixed lot, with Annabelle's Party and Player of Pawns being the best and Paper Chase the worse. The book is heavily tied to evens in Vampire's Chicago setting, and is invaluable to campaigns set there."

== Reviews ==
- Computer + Videogiochi #38 p. 144
- The Games Machine #63 p. 129
- The Games Machine #64 p. 111
- Casus Belli (Issue 70 - Jul 1992)
- Saga #16 (Sep 1992) p. 20
- Saga #12 (Jan 1992) p. 5
