= Heaven & Earth (role-playing game) =

2001 tabletop role-playing game

Heaven & Earth is a role-playing game first published by Event Horizon Productions in 1998, and a second edition published by Guardians of Order in 2001. A third edition was published by Abstract Nova in 2004.

== Description ==
Each edition of Heaven & Earth featured used different mechanics in approximately the same small-town contemporary supernatural setting. The second edition used the Tri-Stat System.

== Publication history ==
Lucien Soulban, the original author of Heaven & Earth was hired by Guardians of Order in 2000, and produced the new edition of his game in (2001).

== Reviews ==
- Pyramid
- Casus Belli #120
