= Streets Tell Stories =

Role-playing game supplement

Streets Tell Stories is a 1993 role-playing supplement for Underground published by Mayfair Games.

== Contents ==
Streets Tell Stories is a supplement in which the enhanced vets of the future year 2021 work to improve the world.

== Reception ==
David C. Hicks reviewed Streets Tell Stories in White Wolf #40 (1994), rating it a 4 out of 5 and stated that "The box's books, map, newspaper and loose-leaf sheets are well worth the price. However, many of the 16 pages of full-color props are an absolute waste. Production money could have been spent on fewer props that are more usable."
