= Hero System Rulesbook =

Role-playing game set of rules

Cover art by George Pérez and John Stracuzzi, 1990

Hero System Rulesbook is a supplement published by Hero Games/Iron Crown Enterprises in 1990 for role-playing games using the Hero System rules.

== Contents ==
Hero System Rulesbook is the basic rulebook that presents a role-playing system used by all Hero Games products. It uses a simplified game mechanic using primarily six-sided dice to main attributes and skill challenges, a hex grid for maps, and a "point-buy" system for buying skills and powers.

== Publication history ==
In 1981, Hero Games published the superhero role-playing game (RPG) Champions that used the "Hero System" set of rules. Hero Games subsequently published a second- and third-edition of Champions, as well as a number of role-playing games in other genres that used the same Hero System rules, including the pulp-inspired Justice Inc. (1984), espionage RPG Danger International (1985), and fantasy RPG Fantasy Hero (1986). By this time, Hero Games was in financial difficulty, and was eventually taken over as a subsidiary of Iron Crown Enterprises (I.C.E.). In 1989, Hero Games/I.C.E. published a fourth edition of Champions that included the latest version of the Hero System rules. Seeing the commercial success of the stand-alone GURPS (Generic Universal Role-Playing System) rules by Steve Jackson Games, Hero Games broke out the rules from the fourth edition of Champions and published them as Hero System Rulesbook in 1990.

In the 2014 book Designers & Dragons: The '80s, game historian Shannon Appelcline noted that "Now GURPS (1986) was gaining steam, and the benefits of a truly universal system were becoming more obvious. Therefore, Rob Bell [of Hero Games] unified the Hero System. With the release of Champions fourth edition (1989), the Hero System Rulesbook (1990), and Fantasy Hero (1990), there was a second (mostly) universal game system on the market."

Hero System Rulesbook, a 220-page softcover, was written by George MacDonald, Steve Peterson, and Rob Bell, with a cover by George Pérez and John Stracuzzi.

== Reception ==
In the October 1990 edition of Dragon (Issue #162), Allen Varney liked the fact that this book included "the most neglected of rulebook virtues: an index." He concluded with a recommendation, saying, "This book provides an economical introduction to the Hero System rules and is a handy reference for those times (such as the last hours of gaming conventions) when the hardcover is just too heavy to carry."

== Other reviews ==
- Alarums & Excursions #177 (May 1990, p.68))
