= Stronghold Builder's Guidebook =

Dungeons & Dragons sourcebook

- The cover to the Stronghold Builder's Guidebook
- Author: Matt Forbeck and David Noonan
- Genre: Role-playing game
- Publisher: Wizards of the Coast
- Publication date: May 2002
- Media type: Book
- Pages: 128
- ISBN: 978-0-7869-2655-8

Stronghold Builder's Guidebook is a sourcebook for the 3rd edition of the Dungeons & Dragons fantasy role-playing game.

== Contents ==
This 128-page book begins with a table of contents with a list of tables found in the book, followed by a brief introduction on page 4. Chapter 1: Building a Stronghold (pages 4–14) details a step-by-step process by which DMs and players can design a stronghold. Notes provided include how to stock the structure with gear and fill it with people, and figuring how much it costs. Chapter 2: Stronghold Components (pages 14–86) describes where and how to place items such as walls and doors, and various locations that can be placed within a stronghold. Also described are suggestions on how to place magic items, spells, traps, and siege weapons in a stronghold. Chapter 3: Strongholds in Your Campaign (pages 87–104) includes tips for building a campaign with a stronghold as the setting, as well as how to use the book in adventures that have already been established. This chapter also details how a stronghold can be attacked or defended during combat. Chapter 4: Example Strongholds (pages 104-128) provides room-by-room descriptions and maps for five detailed structures that can be used in a campaign. These include a simple keep, an undersea castle made of coral, a dwarven redoubt, a floating tower, and a citadel of the planes.

== Publication history ==
The book was published in May 2002, and was written by Matt Forbeck and David Noonan. It featured cover art by Brom and interior art by David Day.

== Reception ==
A review from RPGnet said that "All in all, the Stronghold Builder’s Guide is a useful, solid product. It is well designed, clean and well written, but lacks a certain amount of flair that would have made it truly outstanding, the authors not having quite gone the extra mile."

== Reviews ==
- Asgard #6
- Coleção Dragão Brasil
