= Space Gods =

Role-playing game supplement

Space Gods is a 1991 role-playing supplement for Torg published by West End Games.

== Contents ==
Space Gods is a supplement in which the ancient race of Akashans returns to earth after a long absence.

== Reception ==
S. John Ross reviewed Space Gods in White Wolf #32 (July/Aug., 1992), rating it a 4 out of 5 and stated that "The non-invasive theme is refreshing, and would offer a lot of depth to any active Torg campaign. I recommend this book to any Torg GM, and I recommend it without hesitation to Torg GMs fond of science fiction and/or horror."
