= Into the Troll Realms =

Fantasy tabletop role-playing game supplement

Troll Adventures and Encounters for RuneQuest
- Cover art by Steve Purcell, 1988
- Designers: Greg Stafford; Sandy Petersen
- Publishers: Avalon Hill
- Publication: 1988; 37 years ago
- Genres: Fantasy
- Systems: Basic Role-Playing
- ISBN: 978-0911605785

Into the Troll Realms, subtitled "Troll Adventures and Encounters for RuneQuest" is a supplement that includes adventures and material that involve interactions with trolls, published under license by Avalon Hill in 1988 for Chaosium's fantasy role-playing game RuneQuest

== Description ==
Into the Troll Realms includes three RuneQuest scenarios in which the player characters must interact with trolls:

- "Skyfall Lake": In order to gain permission to travel through troll territory in order to complete a business transaction, the player characters must first enter into a drinking contest with some trolls.
- "Grubfarm": The player characters are hired to go to the troll-controlled Grubfarm and either negotiate with the trolls for some royal jelly, or raid the farm for the jelly.
- "Flying Trollkin": A friend of the player characters is kidnapped by several flying trollkin, and the player characters only have two days to rescue the victim.

The book also includes three small encounters that can be played on their own or integrated into the larger adventures, as well as the rules to the game "Trollball"; this material originally appeared in Chaosium's 1982 publication Trollpak.

== Publication history ==
Chaosium originally published the fantasy role-playing game Runequest in 1978 set in the fictional world of Glorantha, and quickly followed this with a second edition the following year. In an attempt to increase distribution and marketing of Runequest, Chaosium made a deal with game giant Avalon Hill in 1984 to publish the third edition of RuneQuest. Under the agreement, Avalon Hill took ownership of the trademark for RuneQuest, but Chaosium did not include the setting of Glorantha in the license unless the content was either created or approved by Chaosium staff. If Chaosium did not supply Glorantha material, Avalon Hill used a generic setting called "Fantasy Earth".

Into the Troll Realms is one of the Glorantha-based supplements supplied by Chaosium but published by Avalon Hill in 1988, a 48-page softcover book written by Greg Stafford and Sandy Petersen, with interior art by Daniel Brererton, cartography by Charlie Krank, and cover art by Steve Purcell.

== Reception ==
Philip A. Murphy reviewed Troll Realms for Games International magazine, and gave it 3 stars out of 5, and stated that "Troll Realms is, in truth, an exact uplift of Book 3: Into Uzdom from Chaosium's original TrollPak (minus the 22 pages on the Sezdorf Clan). If you already possess that boxed set then there's nothing here for you; if not, it's an essential buy."

In the August 1989 edition of Dragon (#148), Jim Bambra complimented the authors for breaking away from their usual combat-oriented material, noting "By describing trolls in their natural habitat and by allowing PCs to interact with them through role-playing, rather than through violence, Into the Troll Realms clearly shows how trolls can be used as colorful and interesting non-player characters." Although Bambra thought that all of "the adventures are of a uniformly high quality and emphasize role-playing over combat", he especially liked the third scenario, "Flying Trollkin", calling the encounter "excellent, it builds steadily in atmosphere and gives us neat and evocative images of how trollkin think and act. Surprisingly, this is achieved in less than one page of text." He concluded with a strong recommendation, saying, "Grab a copy for inspiration and to enjoy some excellent monster-oriented encounters."

== See also ==
Avalon Hill 3rd edition Runequest books
