= River of Cradles =

Role-playing game supplement

River of Cradles is a 1992 role-playing supplement for RuneQuest published by Avalon Hill.

== Contents ==
River of Cradles is a supplement in which the Big Rubble setting is detailed.

== Reception ==
Phillip Hessel reviewed River of Cradles in White Wolf #41 (March, 1994), rating it a 4 out of 5 and stated that "This is not a building-by-building description of a city. It's a look at a whole region, with just the sort of details that make an imaginary world 'breathe.' This is great stuff!"

== Reviews ==
- Casus Belli #75
- The Last Province (Issue 3 - 1993)
