= Horrors of the Z'Bri =

Role-playing game supplement

Horrors of the Z'Bri is a 1999 role-playing game supplement for Tribe 8 published by Dream Pod 9.

== Contents ==
Horrors of the Z'Bri is a supplement which focuses on the past and present of the beings known as the Z'bri.

== Reception ==
Horrors of the Z'Bri was reviewed in the online second version of Pyramid which said "The Z'Bri are the third part of the triumvirate of groups around which Tribe 8 is based. They are the monsters of the Tribe 8 setting. They don't eat flesh or drink blood (well, not all of them). They're extra-dimension entities of spirit who came to Earth to experience the pleasures of the flesh. Pleasure, of course, is such a variable term."

== Reviews ==
- Backstab #19
