= Gloranthan Bestiary =

Role-playing game supplement

Gloranthan Bestiary is a 1988 role-playing game supplement published by Avalon Hill for RuneQuest.

== Contents ==
Gloranthan Bestiary is a supplement in which more than sixty Gloranthan creatures are presented, most accompanied by illustrations, and includes large‑scale world maps that show where these beings are found across the setting.

== Publication history ==
Gloranthan Bestiary was written by Sandy Petersen and Greg Stafford, with a cover by Steve Purcell and illustrations by Kevin Ramos and published by The Avalon Hill Game Company in 1988 as a 48-page book.

== Reviews ==
- The Games Machine #13
