= Hero System Almanac 1 =

Role-playing game supplement

Hero System Almanac 1 is a 1993 role-playing supplement for Hero System published by Hero Games/Iron Crown Enterprises.

== Contents ==
Hero System Almanac 1 is a supplement in which optional rules and information for campaigns is included.

== Reception ==
Sean Holland reviewed Hero System Almanac 1 in White Wolf #39 (1994), rating it a 3.5 out of 5 and stated that "This book is useful for Champions gamemasters in particular. GMs of other Hero System games may find the Almanac less useful but still valuable."
