= When Axioms Collide =

Role-playing game adventure

When Axioms Collide is a 1992 role-playing adventure for Torg published by West End Games.

== Plot summary ==
When Axioms Collide is an adventure in which the Storm Knights (player characters) lead the local resistance forces of CyberFrance in an ambush against a convoy from MindBody Technologies.

== Reception ==
S. John Ross reviewed When Axioms Collide in White Wolf #34 (Jan./Feb., 1993), rating it a 3 out of 5 and stated that "For GMs that DO have access to this material, and who have Storm Knights adventuring in the vicinity of CyberFrance, I recommend this adventure without reservation."
