= Dorastor: Land of Doom =

Fantasy tabletop role-playing game supplement

Dorastor
Land of Doom
- Cover by Linda Michaels.
- Designers: Greg Stafford; Sandy Petersen; Ken Rolston
- Publishers: Avalon Hill
- Publication: 1993; 33 years ago
- Genres: Fantasy
- Systems: Basic Role-Playing
- ISBN: 1560380748

Dorastor: Land of Doom is a 1993 tabletop role-playing game supplement, written by Greg Stafford, Sandy Petersen, and Ken Rolston, with a cover by Linda Michaels for RuneQuest, and published by Avalon Hill.

== Contents ==
The book describes the frontier borderlands of Glorantha, and includes history, important places, new monsters, and several scenarios.

== Publication history ==
During the 1990s, Avalon Hill published a series of sourcebooks in an attempt to revitalize the aging Runequest game that had first been published by Chaosium in 1978. However, the effort was short-lived. According to Shannon Appelcline in the 2014 book Designers & Dragons: The '80s, "the RuneQuest Renaissance only lasted two years, through six well-received supplements including the long-awaited Dorastor (1993)."

Dorastor: Land of Doom is a bundle consisting of a 128-page softcover book, a 16-page reference book and a 17" x 11" mapsheet. The package was designed by Sandy Petersen, Ken Rolston, Greg Stafford, Troy Bankert, Ken Kaufer, Oliver Jovanovic, Finula McCaul, and Paul Reilly, with illustrations by John T. Snyder and Merle Insinga, and cover art by Linda Michaels.

== Reception ==
In the December 1993 edition of Dragon (Issue #200), Rick Swan criticized the "routine encounters", and a "tedious chapter of monster descriptions [that] consumes more than a third of the book." But Swan noted that the book aimed "at the high IQ-end of the RPG market" and called it "challenging, intense, state-of-the-art." However, Swan pointed out that the RuneQuest game was "old hat" and "clunky" compared to newer games like White Wolf Publishing's Mage: The Ascension, and foretold the demise of Avalon Hill's efforts, concluding that "Over the past couple of years, the supplements have overshadowed the game. If that trend continues, I don't see how RuneQuest can survive."

Phillip Hessel reviewed Dorastor: Land of Doom in White Wolf Inphobia #50 (Dec. 1994), rating it a 3 out of 5 and stated that "What's here is excellent. Missing are 'hooks' for adventures besides monster hunts. Dorastor is worth a look if you have plenty of time and energy to create maps, characters and plots, which is required to put flesh on this sturdy skeleton."

== See also ==
- Avalon Hill 3rd edition Runequest books
