= Champions of Ruin =

Tabletop role-playing game supplement

- Champions of Ruin book cover
- Author: Jeff Crook, Wil Upchurch, and Eric L. Boyd
- Genre: Role-playing games
- Publisher: Wizards of the Coast
- Publication date: May 2005
- Media type: Hardcover

Champions of Ruin is a hardcover accessory for the 3.5 edition of the Dungeons & Dragons fantasy role-playing game.

== Contents ==
Champions of Ruin is a world setting supplement, detailing the role of evil in the Forgotten Realms setting.

== Publication history ==
Champions of Ruin was published in May 2005, and was designed by Jeff Crook, Wil Upchurch, and Eric L. Boyd. Cover art was by Lucio Parillo, with interior art by Thomas M. Baxa, Wayne England, Jason Engle, Ralph Horsley, Warren Mahy, Raven Mimura, William O'Connor, Lucio Parillo, and Marc Sasso.
