= John Terra =

Belgian singer

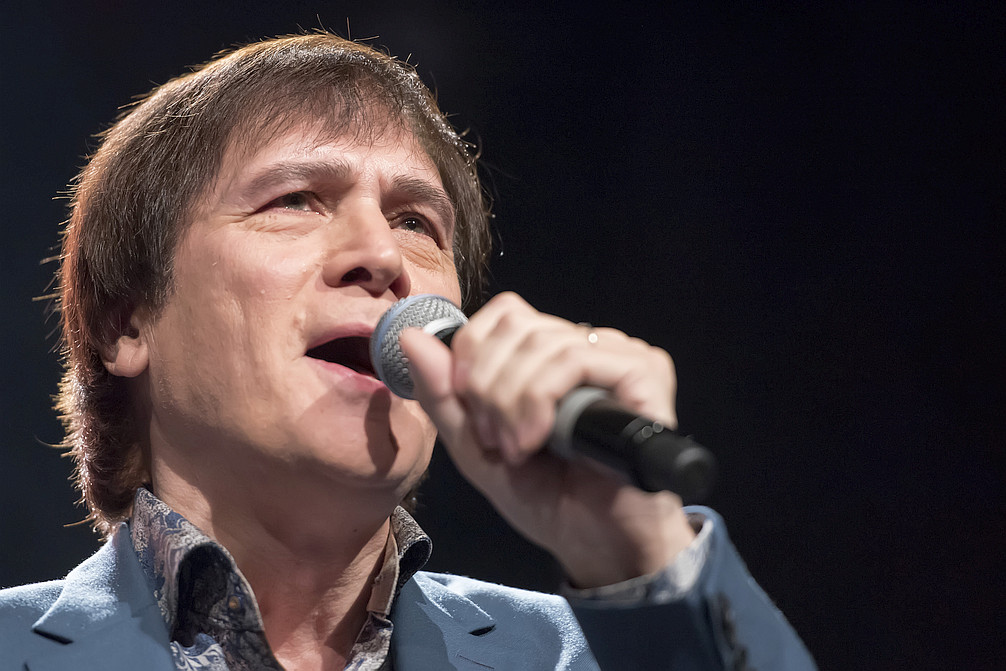

Background information
- Born: Johnny Henri Terwingen; 21 June 1951 (age 74); Maasmechelen, Belgium
- Genres: Pop
- Occupations: Singer, producer

Johnny Henri Terwingen (born 21 June 1951 in Maasmechelen), better known as John Terra, is a Belgian singer and crooner mainly in Flemish. Following years of successful performances, he transitioned into producing music for other renowned Belgian artists.

== Discography ==
=== Albums ===
Year	Album	Peak positions
Year	Album	BEL (Fl)
2016	John Terra zingt Neil Diamond	10
2022	Even van de wereld	23

=== Singles ===
Year	Album	Peak positions
Year	Album	BEL (Fl)
1973	"Iemand heeft je pijn gedaan"	6
1973	"Is er een ander? (tussen jou en mij)"	3
1974	"Nooit of nooit"	16
1974	"A la Espagnola"	13
1976	"Verliefd, voor de eerste keer"	21
1981	"De dag dat het zonlicht niet meer scheen"	12
1982	"Ik weet niet waarom"	28
1990	"De lente"	40
1991	"Megamix"	49
1994	"Trouw"	50
1994	"Mijn geschenk"	29
2013	"De mooiste dag van m'n leven"	37 (Ultratip)
2014	"Breek je wereld open"	35 (Ultratip)
2015	"Neem me mee"	44
2015	"Ik moet wel geloven"	9 (Ultratip)
2016	"Welkom Rosie"	50
2018	"Waarom ben je weggegaan?"	37 (Ultratip)
2019	"Elise"	29 (Ultratip)

- For positions indicated as Ultratip, the song did not appear in the official Belgian Ultratop 50 charts, but rather in the bubbling under Ultratip charts.
