= Lucien Soulban =

Saudi Arabian game designer and writer

- Born: Saudi Arabia
- Occupations: Game designer, writer

Lucien Moussa Shukri Soulban is a Saudi Arabian game designer and writer who has worked primarily on role-playing games.

== Personal life ==
Lucien Soulban was born in Saudi Arabia, where he lived for 12 years before attending school in Texas. He later moved to Montreal.

== Career ==
Lucien Soulban wrote game material for White Wolf, Dream Pod 9, and other companies before being hired by Guardians of Order in 2000, and began work on Heaven & Earth (2001). Soulban also developed Guardians of Order's superhero role-playing game Silver Age Sentinels (2002). He subsequently went to White Wolf Games where he wrote the Orpheus role playing game and a tie-in novel for Vampire: The Requiem. He also wrote a Warhammer 40000 novel, Desert Raiders.

Soulban was a guest at Otakuthon in 2007, and 2008.

His D&D work includes the game supplement Children of the Night: The Created (1999), and Dragonlance novels such as The Alien Sea (2006) and Renegade Wizards (2009).

He has written the script for the games: Tom Clancy's Rainbow Six: Vegas, Far Cry 3, Far Cry 3: Blood Dragon, Far Cry 4. and Watch Dogs 2.
