= Faery's Tale =

Tabletop role-playing game

Faery's Tale is a 2006 role-playing game by Patrick Sweeney, produced by Firefly Games and published by Green Ronin.

== Contents ==
Faery's Tale is a beginner‑friendly storytelling game in which players play as tiny faeries—pixies, brownies, sprites, or pookas—protecting the magical realm of Brightwood through whimsical adventures using simple, kid‑accessible rules.

== Reception ==
The game was nominated in 2007 for an ENnie Award for Best Game and the deluxe version was a finalist for the 34th Origins Awards for Best Roleplaying Game.

== Reviews ==
- Pyramid
- Family Games: The 100 Best
