= 2000 Origins Award winners =

The following are the winners of the 27th annual (2000) Origins Award, presented at Origins 2001:

Category	Winner	Company	Designer(s)
Best Historical Figure Series 2000	Hammer's Hellhounds (US Paratroopers)	Easy Eight Enterprises Hammer's	Sculptor: Jim Bland
Best Abstract Board Game 2000	Icehouse: The Martian Chess Set	Looney Labs	Designers: Andrew Looney, John Cooper
Best Amateur Game Periodical 2000	Alarums & Excursions	Publisher: Lee Gold	
Best Card Game Expansion or Supplement 2000	BRAWL: Club Foglio	Cheapass Games	Designer: James Ernest
Best Game Aid or Accessory 2000	The Munchkin's Guide To Powergaming	Steve Jackson Games	Designers: James "Grim" Desborough, Steve "Big Steve" Mortimer, Phil "Editor" Masters
Best Game-Related Novel 2000	Dragons of a Fallen Sun	Wizards of the Coast, Inc.	Authors: Margaret Weis, Tracy Hickman
Best Game-Related Short Work 2000	Matt and Gilly's Big Date	Dork Storm Press	Author: John Kovalic
Best Graphic Design of a Roleplaying Game, Adventure, or Supplement 2000	Monster Manual	Wizards of the Coast	Graphic Designers: Sean Glenn, Sherry Floyd
Best Graphic Presentation of a Board Game 2000	The Hills Rise Wild!	Pagan Publishing	Art Director: Jesper Myrfors; Graphic Designer: John Tynes
Best Graphic Presentation of a Card Game 2000	BRAWL: Club Foglio	Cheapass Games	Graphic Designer: James Ernest
Best Historical Board Game 2000	Axis & Allies: Europe	Avalon Hill	Designer: Larry Harris
Best Historical Figure Miniatures Series 2000	Hammer's Hellhounds (US Paratroopers)	Easy Eight Enterprises	Sculptor: Jim Bland
Best Historical Miniatures Rules 2000	Fields of Honor	Pinnacle Entertainment Group	Designer: Shane Lacy Hensley
Best Play-by-Mail Game 2000	Starweb	Flying Buffalo Inc.	Designer: Rick Loomis
Best Professional Game Periodical 2000	Pyramid	Steve Jackson Games	Editor: Steven Marsh
Best Roleplaying Adventure 2000	Death in Freeport	Green Ronin Publishing	Designer: Chris Pramas
Best Roleplaying Game 2000	Dungeons & Dragons	Wizards of the Coast	Designers: Jonathan Tweet, Monte Cook, Skip Williams
Best Roleplaying Supplement 2000	GURPS Steampunk	Steve Jackson Games	Designer: William H. Stoddard
Best Science Fiction or Fantasy Board Game 2000	The Great Brain Robbery	Cheapass Games	Designer: James Ernest
Best Science Fiction or Fantasy Figure Miniature 2000	Beholder	Wizards of the Coast	Sculptor: Kim Graham, Will Hannah
Best Science-Fiction or Fantasy Miniatures Rules 2000	Mage Knight: Rebellion	WizKids	Designers: Jordan Weisman, Kevin Barrett
Best Trading Card Game 2000	Sailor Moon Collectible Card Game	Dart Flipcards	Designers: Mark C. MacKinnon, Jeff Mackintosh, Karen McLarney, John R. Phythyon, Jr.
Best Traditional Card Game 2000	Chrononauts	Looney Labs	Designer: Andrew Looney
Best Vehicular Miniature 2000	Shadowsword Titan Hunter	Forge World	Sculptor: Brian Fawcett
Best Roleplaying Adventure of 2000	Death in Freeport	Green Ronin Publishing	Designer: Chris Pramas
