= Aaron S. Rosenberg =

American novelist and game designer (born 1969)

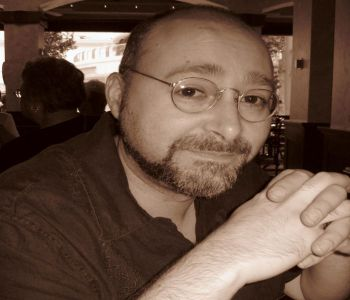
- Image of Aron Rosenberg
- Occupation: Author

Aaron S. Rosenberg is an American novelist, short story writer, children's books author, and game designer.

== Career ==
Rosenberg has written novels for franchises including Star Trek, StarCraft, Warcraft, Exalted, Stargate Atlantis, Shadowrun, Mutants & Masterminds, and Warhammer. He also writes educational books, young adult novels, children's books, and tabletop role-playing games. He won an Origins Award in 2003 for Game Mastering Secrets (2002), and his young adult novelization Bandslam: The Novel won the Scribe Award for best Young Adult novel in 2010.

Other young adult and children works of his are his literary adaptions of iCarly and the 2010 animated film Alpha and Omega. Rosenberg wrote the first-ever tie-in novel for the television series Eureka, entitled Substitution Method, under the house name Cris Ramsay. His second Eureka novel, Roads Less Traveled, was released in early 2011. He is also the author of the Dread Remora space-opera series and the co-author of the O.C.L.T. occult thriller series, both from Crossroad Press, the Areyat Isles fantasy pirate series from Eldros Legacy, the Yeti urban fantasy series from Paradoxa Press, and the Relicant Chronicles epic fantasy series from Falstaff Books.

=== Crazy 8 Press ===
Rosenberg is also part of Crazy 8 Press, a cooperative publishing venture he started in 2011 with fellow authors Peter David, Michael Jan Friedman, Robert Greenberger, Glenn Hauman, and Howard Weinstein. His science fiction novel No Small Bills was released by Crazy 8 in September 2011. The sequel, Too Small for Tall, was released in September 2012 and the next two books in the series, Three Small Coinkydinks and Not for Small Minds, were released in 2014 and 2018, respectively.

Rosenberg lives in New York City with his family.

== Publications ==
=== Novels ===
- The Relicant Chronicles, Book Five: Bones Past. New York, NY: Crazy 8 Press, 2025.
- Bindings. Hertford, NC: Crossroad Press, 2025.
- PRISM: The Mission Files. New York: Crazy 8 Press, 2025.
- The Blooded Coin. Hartford, CT: Christopher D. Abbott, 2025.
- Systema Paradoxa, Volume 24: Snapped Up: A Tale of the Beast of Busco. Pennsville, NJ: NeoParadoxa, 2025.
- Shadowrun: Basecracking. Lake Stevens, WA: Catalyst Game Labs, 2024.
- Areyat Isles, Book Three: The Fated Blade. New York: Crazy 8 Press, 2024.
- The Adventures of Cannon Belle. New York: Crazy 8 Press, 2023.
- Lost and Never Found: A Mutants & Masterminds Novel. Seattle: Nisaba Press, 2023.
- Stealing the Storm. Kansas City, KS: New Mythology Press, 2023.
- Exalted: Facets of Truth. Macungie, PA: Onyx Path Publishing, 2023.
- Yeti Left Home. Pennsville, NJ: NeoParadoxa, 2023.
- PRISM: The Medusa Maneuver. New York: Crazy 8 Press, 2022.
- PRISM: The Junkyard Gambit. New York: Crazy 8 Press, 2022.
- Deadly Fortune. Kansas City, KS: New Mythology Press, 2022.
- The Relicant Chronicles, Book Four: Bones at Rest. Charlotte, NC: Falstaff Books, 2022.
- O.C.L.T.: Focal Point. Hertford, NC: Crossroad Press, 2022.
- Time of the Phoenix. New York: Crazy 8 Press, 2021.
- Cross the Road. New York: Crazy 8 Press, 2021.
- Gone to Ground. Pennsville, NJ: NeoParadoxa, 2021.
- Death in Silents. New York: Crazy 8 Press, 2020.
- Shadowrun: Shadow Dance. Lake Stevens, WI: Catalyst Game Labs, 2020.
- The Relicant Chronicles, Book Three: Crossed Bones. Charlotte, NC: Falstaff Books, 2020.
- One Haunted Summer. New York: Crazy 8 Press, 2019.
- Height of the Storm: A Mutants & Masterminds Novel. Seattle: Nisaba Press, 2019.
- The Relicant Chronicles, Book Two: Trails of Bone. Charlotte, NC: Falstaff Books, 2019.
- Exalted: False Images. Macungie, PA: Onyx Path Publishing, 2019.
- The Relicant Chronicles, Book One: Bones of Empire. Charlotte, NC: Falstaff Books, 2019.
- Not for Small Minds. New York: Crazy 8 Press, 2018.
- O.C.L.T.: Digging Deep. Hertford, NC: Crossroad Press, 2018.
- Hearts of Iron: War Stories. Stockholm: Paradox Interactive, 2016.
- Three Small Coinkydinks. New York: Crazy 8 Press, 2014.
- For This Is Hell. New York: Crazy 8 Press, 2014.
- Honor of the Dread Remora: A Tale of the Scattered Earth. Hertford, NC: Crossroad Press, 2013.
- Too Small for Tall. New York: Crazy 8 Press, 2012.
- O.C.L.T.: Incursion. Hertford, NC: Crossroad Press, 2011.
- Crossed Paths: A Tale of the Dread Remora. Hertford, NC: Crossroad Press, 2011.
- No Small Bills. New York: Crazy 8 Press, 2011.
- Eureka: Roads Less Traveled. (under the house name Cris Ramsay) New York: Ace Books, 2011.
- O.C.L.T.: Brought to Light. Hertford, NC: Crossroad Press, 2011.
- Birth of the Dread Remora: A Tale of the Scattered Earth. Hertford, NC: Crossroad Press, 2011.
- Eureka: Substitution Method. (under the house name Cris Ramsay) New York: Ace Books, 2010.
- Stargate Atlantis: Hunt and Run. Surbiton, UK: Fandemonium, 2010.
- World of Warcraft: Beyond the Dark Portal. New York: Pocket Books, 2008.
- Star Trek S.C.E.: Creative Couplings. New York: Pocket Books, 2007.
- DaemonGate Trilogy, Book Three: The Hour of the Daemon. London: Black Library, 2007.
- World of Warcraft: Tides of Darkness. New York: Pocket Books, 2007.
- DaemonGate Trilogy, Book Two: The Night of the Daemon. London: Black Library, 2006.
- Star Trek S.C.E.: Aftermath. New York: Pocket Books, 2006.
- StarCraft: The Queen of Blades. New York: Pocket Books, 2006.
- DaemonGate Trilogy, Book One: The Day of the Daemon. London: Black Library, 2006.
- Exalted: The Carnelian Flame. Atlanta: White Wolf Publishing, 2005.
- Star Trek S.C.E.: Creative Couplings, Book II. New York: Pocket Books, 2005.
- Star Trek S.C.E.: Creative Couplings, Book I. New York: Pocket Books, 2004.
- Star Trek S.C.E.: Collective Hindsight, Book II. New York: Pocket Books, 2003.
- Star Trek S.C.E.: Collective Hindsight, Book I. New York: Pocket Books, 2003.
- Star Trek S.C.E.: The Riddled Post. New York: Pocket Books, 2001.

=== Young adult novels ===
- Shake It Up: Born to Dance. New York: Disney, 2013.
- Latchkeys: Splinters. New York: Crazy 8 Press, 2013.
- 42: The Jackie Robinson Story: The Movie Novel. New York: Scholastic, 2012.
- KnightStar: Knight of the Starborne. Chandler, AZ: Actionopolis, 2012.
- Alpha & Omega: The Junior Novel. New York: Scholastic, 2010.
- iTwins/iSaved Your Life. New York: Scholastic, September 2010.
- Chaotic: The Khilaian Sphere. New York: Grosset & Dunlap, 2010.
- iCarly Goes to Japan: The Junior Novel. New York: Scholastic, 2010.
- Bandslam: The Novel. New York: Grosset & Dunlap, 2009.

=== Children's books ===
- Finding Gobi: Young Reader's Edition. Nashville: Thomas Nelson, 2017.
- STEMWork #2: Blackout: Danger in the Dark. New York: Barrons, 2016.
- STEMWork #1: Flood: Caught by the Tide. New York: Barrons, 2016.
- Pete and Penny's Pizza Puzzles #4: Case of the Sinking Circus. New York: Price Stern Sloan, 2012.
- Pete and Penny's Pizza Puzzles #3: Case of the Book Burglar. New York: Price Stern Sloan, 2012.
- KnightStar: Knight of the Starborne. Chandler, AZ: Actionopolis, 2011.
- Lego Star Wars: Anakin, Space Pilot. New York: Scholastic, 2011.
- Pete and Penny's Pizza Puzzles #2: Case of the Topsy-Turvy Toy. New York: Price Stern Sloan, 2011.
- Pete and Penny's Pizza Puzzles #1: Case of the Secret Sauce. New York: Price Stern Sloan, 2011.
- Transformers Animated: Bumblebee vs. Meltdown. New York: HarperFestival, 2008.
- Transformers Animated: Attack of the Dinobots. New York: HarperFestival, 2008.
- Powerpuff Girls Continuity Chapter Book #16: Bubbles in the Middle. New York: Scholastic, 2002.

=== Short stories ===
- “As Agents Andronicus.” Shakespeare Adjacent. Woodland Park, NJ: Lou Tambone Press, 2025.
- “DuckBob: Reunion.” A Future for Ferals. Pennsville, NJ: eSpec Books, 2025.
- “Dispersion” and “Film Fiasco” PRISM: The Mission Files. New York: Crazy 8 Press, 2025.
- “The Case of the Missing Mycroft.” Sherlock Holmes: Cases by Candlelight, Vol. IV. Hartford, CT: Christopher D. Abbott, 2025.
- “Of Debts Owed.” The Shadowed Alcove. Loveland, OH: Blackspoon Press, 2025.
- “A Fearsome Tail.” An Assembly of Monsters. Pennsville, NJ: eSpec Books, 2025.
- “Bonds of Friendship.” Thrilling Adventure Yarns, Vol. IV. New York: Crazy 8 Press, 2025.
- “Chasing Fame.” Silverado Press Presents: Western Stories by Today’s Top Writers. Gilbert, AZ: Silverado Press, 2025.
- “The Case of the Displaced.” Multiverse of Mystery. Calabasas, CA: International Association of Media Tie-in Writers, 2024.
- “Dog Days.” Shadowrun: Magic, Machines, and Mayhem. Lake Stevens, WA: Catalyst Game Labs, Fall 2024.
- “The Case of the Noted Crook.” Sherlock Holmes: Cases by Candlelight, Vol. III. Hartford, CT: Christopher D. Abbott, 2024.
- “Death Knells & Life Choices.” Origins Anthology 2024: A Trove of Legacies. New York: Crazy 8 Press, 2024.
- “No Safe Harbour.” Other Aether. Pennsville, NJ: eSpec Books, 2024.
- “The Houndstooth Affair.” A Cry of Hounds. Pennsville, NJ: eSpec Books, 2024.
- “In Pursuit of Progress.” A Cry of Hounds. Pennsville, NJ: eSpec Books, 2024.
- “Putting Doom on Paws.” Four ??? of the Apocalypse. New York: Whysper Wude, 2023.
- “Blank Slates.” Four ??? of the Apocalypse. New York: Whysper Wude, 2023.
- “Lighten the Burden.” Path of Absolute Power. Guelph, Ontario: Dyskami Publishing Company, 2023.
- “Stacked Deck.” The Good, the Bad, and the Uncanny. Kansas City, MO: Outland Entertainment, 2023.
- “Setting His Cap.” Pennsville, NJ: NeoParadoxa, 2023.
- “Midas Touched.” On Wings of Steam, Vol. 2. Cincinnati, OH: WinterWolf Publications, 2023.
- “The Case of the Awful Aunts.” Sherlock Holmes: Cases by Candlelight, Vol. II. Hartford, CT: Christopher D. Abbott, 2023.
- “All In.” Origins Anthology 2023: A Roll of the Dice. New York: Crazy 8 Press, 2023.
- “Nobody’s Hero.” Grease Monkeys. Pennsville, NJ: eSpec Books, 2023.
- “A Heavy Air.” Cast of Crows. Pennsville, NJ: eSpec Books, 2023.
- “Cursed Souls.” Bonds of Valor (Libri Valoris, Book 4). Kansas City, KS: New Mythology Press, 2023.
- “Cutting Loose.” Phenomenons: Season of Darkness. New York: Crazy 8 Press, 2023.
- “Rapid Fire.” Thrilling Adventure Yarns, Vol. III. New York: Crazy 8 Press, 2023.
- “Courage by Firelight.” Zorro’s Exploits. Sunrise, FL: Bold Venture Press, 2022.
- “The Abandoned Cell.” Sherlock Holmes: Cases by Candlelight. Hartford, CT: Christopher D. Abbott, 2022.
- “Art In.” Rogue Artists. Detroit: Atthis Arts, 2022.
- “Legit Out of Order.” Tales of Capes and Cowls. Hertford, NC: Crossroad Press, 2022.
- “Under the Trollbridge.” On Wings of Steam. Cincinnati, OH: WinterWolf Publications, 2022.
- “The Big Reveal.” The Fans Are Buried Tales. New York: Crazy 8 Press, 2022.
- “Summer Travels.” OCLT: Focal Point. Hertford, NC: Crossroad Press, 2022.
- “Wielding Authority.” Libri Valoris, Vol. 4. Kansas City, KS: New Mythology Press, 2022.
- “Stealing Home.” Phenomenons. New York: Crazy 8 Press, 2022.
- “The Face of Things.” Talons & Talismans, Vol. 2. Kansas City, KS: New Mythology Press, 2021.
- “Cookie Time.” Mendie, The Post-Apocalyptic Flower Scout, Vol. 1. Lancaster, PA: Fortress Publishing, 2021.
- “DuckBob in: Own It.” Origins Writers Anthology. Columbus, OH: GAMA, 2021.
- “A Model Sailor.” Turning the Tied. Calabasas, CA: International Association of Media Tie-in Writers, 2021.
- “The First Dance.” Thrilling Adventure Yarns, Vol. II. New York: Crazy 8 Press, 2021.
- “For the Win.” Heavy Metal Jupiters and Other Places—Tuesday. Pasadena, CA: NASA Exoplanet Science Institute, 2020.
- “Family Practice.” Changing Breeds: An Anthology. Macungie, PA: Onyx Path, 2020.
- “Obligations.” Pangaea III. New York: Crazy 8 Press, 2020.
- “DuckBob in: Running Hot and Cold.” Bad-Ass Moms. New York: Crazy 8 Press, 2020.
- “On the Flip Side.” Wendigo Tales, Volume One: Savage Stories of Horror and Adventure. Richmond: Pinnacle Entertainment Group, 2020.
- “Wrong Exit.” Darkened Streets. Macungie, PA: Onyx Path, 2019.
- “Honor Thy Name.” Pugmire: The Anthology. Macungie, PA: Onyx Path, 2019.
- “Escape Velocity.” Footprints in the Stars. Pennsville, NJ: eSpec Books, 2019.
- “Slingshot.” Defending the Future VIII: In Harm's Way. Pennsville, NJ: eSpec Books, 2019.
- “No Patience for Fools.” Awesome Tales #10. Fort Lauderdale: Bold Venture Press, 2019.
- “Belle of the Ball.” Thrilling Adventure Yarns. New York: Crazy 8 Press, 2019.
- “A Different Math.” Brave New Girls 4: Adventures of Gals and Gizmos. Jersey City, NJ: Brave New Girls, 2019.
- “Listening In.” Monarchies of Mau: Tales of Excellent Cats. Macungie, PA: Onyx Path, 2019.
- “Within One's Grasp.” Women of the Crystal Coast. Napoleon, OH: Knights of the Northwest, LLC, 2019.
- “Last Light.” Nisaba Journal, Issue 1. Seattle: Nisaba Press, 2018.
- “Shifting Focus.” Master of Orion: To the Stars. Lake Stevens, WA: Catalyst Game Labs, 2018.
- “Life Hack.” Brave New Girls 3: Tales of Heroines Who Hack. Jersey City, NJ: Brave New Girls, 2018.
- “DuckBob: All In.” They Keep Killing Glenn. New York: Crazy 8 Press, 2018.
- “DuckBob: Hunting Apartments.” Mystery! The Origins Game Fair 2018 Anthology. Tampa, FL: Down & Out Books, 2018.
- “Going Home.” Stargate: Homeworlds. Surbiton, UK: Fandemonium, 2017.
- “DuckBob: Killer Service.” Love, Murder & Mayhem. New York: Crazy 8 Press, 2017.
- “Many Hands Make Light.” TV Gods 2. Lancaster, PA: Fortress Publishing, 2017.
- “No Guns at the Bar.” Joe Ledger: Unstoppable. New York: St. Martin's Griffin, 2017.
- “The Southern Gamble.” Altered States of the Union. New York: Crazy 8 Press, 2016.
- “Calling It Due.” Pangaea II. New York: Crazy 8 Press, 2016.
- “Win or Lose.” Man and Machine. Stratford, NJ: eSpec Books, 2016.
- “Dragonbound.” Shadowrun: Drawing Destiny. Lake Stevens, WA: Catalyst Game Labs, 2016.
- “The Southern Gamble.” Altered States of the Union. New York: Crazy 8 Press. 2016.
- “Upon Reflection Dark and Deep.” Champions of Aetaltis. Madison, WI: Mechanical Muse, 2016.
- “The Shtick.” The Side of Evil/The Side of Good. Stratford, NJ: eSpec Books, 2015.
- “Kill Switch.” Stargate: Points of Origin. Surbiton, UK: Fandemonium, 2015.
- “Up In Smoke.” Pangaea. New York: Crazy 8 Press, 2015.
- “Clarity of Mind.” Apollo's Daughters. Washington, D.C.: Silence in the Library, 2015.
- “Life on the Line.” Shadowrun: World of Shadows. Lake Stevens, WA: Catalyst Game Labs, 2015.
- “Oversight.” X-Files: Trust No One. New York: IDW Publishing, March 2015.
- “The Power of Words.” The Bard's Tale. Loveland, OH: Blackspoon Press, 2015.
- “Taking Priority.” Crusader Kings II: The Anthology. Stockholm: Paradox Interactive, 2015.
- “Walking a Tightrope.” Songs of the Sun and Moon: The Changing Breeds Anthology. Atlanta: Obsidian Press, 2014.
- “Well-Suited.” Soothe the Savage Beast. Washington, D.C.: Silence in the Library, 2014.
- “Let No Man Put Asunder.” Europa Universalis IV: What If? The Anthology of Alternate History. Stockholm: Paradox Interactive, 2014.
- “Time to Duck.” Time Traveled Tales, Vol. II. Washington, D.C.: Silence in the Library, 2014.
- “A Lesson Learned.” Tales of the Crimson Keep. New York: Crazy 8 Press, 2014.
- “A Gryphon in Steel and Glass.” Rites of Renown: When Will You Rage 2. Atlanta: Obsidian Press, 2013.
- “Up and Down the Line.” Time Traveled Tales. Washington, D.C.: Silence in the Library, 2013.
- ReDeus: Native Lands. New York: Crazy 8 Press, 2013.
- “A Fixed State.” Origins Writers Anthology. Columbus, OH: GAMA, 2013.
- “With Utmost Dispatch.” Weird Wars Rome. Richmond: Pinnacle Entertainment Group, 2013.
- ReDeus: Beyond Borders. New York: Crazy 8 Press, 2013.
- “Keeping Up with Jonesy.” The Lion and the Aardvark: Aesop's Modern Fables. London: Stoneskin Press, 2013.
- Latchkeys: Time Limit. New York: Crazy 8 Press, 2013.
- ReDeus: Divine Tales. New York: Crazy 8 Press, 2012.
- “Displacement.” World's Collider: A Shared-World Anthology. Smyrna, TN: Nightscape Press, 2012.
- Crossed Worlds – A Crossroad Press Original Series Sampler. Hertford, NC: Crossroad Press, 2012.
- “In Stillness, Music.” Tales of the Far West. Lawrence, KS: Adamant Entertainment, 2012.
- “Gunshade: Rapid Fire.” Thrilling Tales Quarterly #1. Lawrence, KS: Adamant Entertainment, 2008.
- "Distant Fire." Tales of the Last War. Seattle: Wizards of the Coast, 2006.
- "Inescapable Justice." Imaginings: An Anthology of Long Short Fiction. New York: Pocket Books, 2003.
- "Six for the Sword." Legends of the Pendragon. San Francisco: Green Knight Publishing, 2002.
- "Out-of-This-World Prices." The Rift electronic magazine, Spring 1997.
- "Some Just Like It Better That Way." Kiosk #16, Fall 1996.
- "Stranger Things Have Happened." Kaleria, Winter 1996.
- "Afterswords." Castle News #6, March 1996.
- "The Turncoat Maneuver." Castle News #5, February 1996.
- "The Blade." Castle News #3, September 1995.
- "Churchyard Stories." Castle News #3, September 1995.
- "If At First We Don't Succeed, . . ." Periphery. 1994.
- "Poetic inJustice." Kiosk #10, November, 1993.
- "Playing with Fire." Hashinger Literary Magazine #7, April, 1991.

=== Role-playing games ===
- Forged with Fire—Top Secret: New World Order RPG adventure. Berkeley: TSR Games, 2023.
- Smuggler's Guide to the Rim - Firefly Role-Playing Game supplement. Madison: Margaret Weis Productions, 2015.
- Kobold Guide to Combat. Kirkland, WA: Kobold Press, 2014.
- Kobold Guide to Magic. Kirkland, WA: Kobold Press, 2014.
- Hillfolk: Blood on the Snow. London: Pelgrane Press, 2013.
- Sunward - Eclipse Phase supplement. Chicago, IL: Posthuman Studios, 2010.
- Guide to the Hunted - Supernatural Role Playing Game supplement. Madison: Margaret Weis Productions, 2010.
- Warhammer Fantasy Roleplay. Roseville, MN: Fantasy Flight Games, 2009.
- Supernatural Role Playing Game. Margaret Weis Productions. 2009.
- Mars: Savage Worlds Edition. Lawrence, KS: Adamant Entertainment, 2009.
- The Career Compendium — Warhammer Fantasy Roleplay supplement. Roseville, MN: Fantasy Flight Games, 2009.
- The Free Musketeers. Talisman Studios. 2008.
- Shaintar. Talisman Studios. December 2007.
- Lure of the Lich Lord - Warhammer Fantasy Roleplay game supplement. Green Ronin. February 2007. Winner, 2007 Gold ENnie for Best Adventure
- Alliance Players Guide. - Warcraft game supplement. Sword and Sorcery Studio. August 2006.
- Lands of Mystery - Warcraft game supplement. Sword and Sorcery Studio. July 2006.
- Legends of the Twins – Dragonlance game supplement. Sovereign Press. March 2005.
- Shadowspawn's Guide to Sanctuary – Thieves’ World game supplement. Green Ronin. December 2005.
- Deryni Roleplaying Game - game manual. Grey Ghost Press. December 2005.
- Helm's Deep - The Lord of the Rings Roleplaying Game game supplement. Decipher. June 2005.
- The Blue Rose Companion - Blue Rose game supplement. Green Ronin. November 2005.
- Races of Destiny – Dungeons & Dragons game supplement. Wizards of the Coast. December 2004.
- Isengard - The Lord of the Rings Roleplaying Game game supplement. Decipher. November 2004.
- Fields of Battle: The Guide to Barbarians & Warriors - The Lord of the Rings Roleplaying Game game supplement. Decipher. October 2004.
- Stargate SG-1: Season Three – Stargate SG-1 game supplement. Alderac Entertainment Group. September 2004.
- Relics and Rituals: Olympus. Sword and Sorcery Studio. August 2004.
- Realms of Norrath: Dagnor's Cauldon. EverQuest game supplement. Sword and Sorcery Studio. August 2004.
- World's Largest Dungeon. Alderac Entertainment Group. August 2004.
- Realms of Norrath: Greater Faydark, EverQuest game supplement. Sword and Sorcery Studio. July 2004.
- Mythic Vistas: Trojan War. Green Ronin. July 2004.
- Relics and Rituals: Excalibur. Sword and Sorcery Studio. May 2004.
- Advanced d20 Compendium. Sword and Sorcery Studio. May 2004.
- Vampire Players' Guide - Vampire: The Masquerade game supplement. White Wolf Publishing. November 2003.
- Creatures - Star Trek game supplement. Decipher. July 2003.
- Fell Beasts and Wondrous Magic - The Lord of the Rings Roleplaying Game supplement. Decipher. July 2003.
- The Eastern Seaboard - Asylum game supplement. Clockworks. July 2003.
- The Shields of Justice: A Hero's Almanac - Silver Age Sentinels supplement. Guardians of Order. July 2003.
- Dark Inheritance - game manual. Mythic Dreams. March 2003.
- Realms of Norrath: Everfrost Peaks. EverQuest supplement. Sword and Sorcery Studio. March 2003.
- Everquest Gamemasters Guide. Sword and Sorcery Studio. January 2003.
- Beasts of the Wyld - Exalted supplement. White Wolf Publishing. January 2003.
- Roll Call - Silver Age Sentinels supplement. Guardians of Order. January 2003.
- Horrors of the Wasted West - Hell on Earth d20 supplement. Pinnacle. December 2002.
- The Great Weird North- Deadlands game supplement. Pinnacle Entertainment Group. September 2002.
- Cthulhu GM Pack-accessory for Pulp Cthulhu RPG. Chaosium. August 2002.
- Gamemastering Secrets. Grey Ghost Press. August 2002. Winner, 2003 Origins Award for Best Game Aid or Accessory
- Dead From Above- Weird Wars game supplement. Pinnacle. January 2002.
- The JSA Sourcebook - DCU game supplement. West End Games. November 2001.
- Chosen - game manual. Clockworks. August 2001.
- Sins of the Blood - Vampire game supplement. White Wolf. August 2001
- Dying Earth game manual. Pelgrane Press. March 2001.
- The Gotham Sourcebook - DCU game supplement. West End Games. October 2000.
- Asylum Quick-Start - Asylum game supplement. Clockworks. August 2000.
- The JLA Sourcebook - DCU game supplement. West End Games. August 2000.
- Outside Standard Channels - Spookshow game supplement. Clockworks. April 2000.
- Nights of Prophecy - Vampire: The Masquerade game supplement. White Wolf Publishing. March 2000.
- The Staff Manual - Asylum game supplement. Clockworks. July 1999.
- "Dead Connections" - Conspiracy X demo adventure. Eden Studios. June 1999.
- "Long Live . . . Everyone?" - Conspiracy X demo adventure. Eden Studios. June 1999.
- The Price of Freedom - Star Trek game supplement. Last Unicorn. March 1999.
- Tales of Magick: Dark Adventure - Mage: The Ascension game supplement. White Wolf Publishing. January 1999.
- Spookshow - game manual. Clockworks. August 1998.
- Asylum - game manual. Clockworks. August 1997.
- Film Festival #1 - Hong Kong Action Theatre game supplement. Event Horizons Publications. April 1997.
- Hong Kong Action Theatre! - game manual. Event Horizons Publications. August 1996.
- Age of Empire - game manual. Epitaph Studios. December 1996.
- The Strange Files of Dr. Sorcis -Don't Look Back game supplement, Mind Ventures Games. July 1996.
- Periphery - game manual. Epitaph Studios. April, 1994.

=== Educational books ===
- Discovery Channel's Megalodon and Prehistoric Sharks. New York: Zenescope, 2013. (forthcoming)
- Eighth Day Genesis: A Worldbuilding Codex for Writers and Creatives. Madison, WI: Alliteration Ink, 2012.
- Animal Planet: World's Most Dangerous Animals. New York: Zenescope, 2012.
- World War II - Library Edition (6 Degrees Bios). New York: Scholastic, 2011.
- Discovery Channel's Dinosaurs and Prehistoric Predators New York: Zenescope, 2011.
- The Civil War - Library Edition (6 Degrees Bios). New York: Scholastic, 2010.
- Storytelling: An Encyclopedia of Mythology and Folklore. New York: M.E. Sharpe, 2008.
- Newsmakers: Vladimir Putin. Rosen Publishing. June 2007.
- Leaders of the Enlightenment: Thomas Hobbes. Rosen Publishing. May 2005.
- The Library of Author Biographies: Madeleine L'Engle.. Rosen Publishing. April 2005.
- The Library of Graphic Novelists: Colleen Doran. Rosen Publishing. January 2005.
- Extreme Sports Biographies: Dave Mirra. Rosen Publishing. May 2004.
- Extreme Sports Biographies: Taïg Khris. Rosen Publishing. March 2004.
- Biographies of Arab Leaders: Gamal Abdel-Nassar. Rosen Publishing. February 2004.
- Extreme Careers: Cryptology. Rosen Publishing. January 2004.
- War and Conflict in the Middle East: The Yom Kippur War. Rosen Publishing. December 2003.
- Rad Sports Techniques, Training and Tricks: Razor (Scooter). Rosen Publishing. February 2003.
- Rad Sports Techniques, Training and Tricks: Mountain Biking. Rosen Publishing. December 2002.
- Advanced Skateboarding: A Guide to More Tricks and Air Time. Rosen Publishing. September 2002.
- A Beginner's Guide to Very Cool Skateboarding Tricks. Rosen Publishing. July 2002.
- Unsolved Mysteries: the Bermuda Triangle. Rosen Publishing. January 2002.

=== Articles ===
- "Nobody On Board." - article. Shadowrun: Augment, Issue 4. Lake Stevens, WA: Catalyst Game Labs, 2025.
- "Sealing It Up." - article. Shadowrun: Augment, Issue 3. Lake Stevens, WA: Catalyst Game Labs, 2025.
- "Stacking the Deck." - article. Shadowrun: Augment, Issue 2. Lake Stevens, WA: Catalyst Game Labs, 2025.
- "Last Lunch at a Legend." - article. Shadowrun: Augment, Issue 1. Lake Stevens, WA: Catalyst Game Labs, 2025.
- "Can I Be Allergic to Glass?" - article. Pyramid Magazine. August 4, 2003.
- "What, Me Heal?" - article. Pyramid Magazine. July 25, 2003.
- "HeroMachine: A New Face in Games" - feature article. Games Unplugged Magazine #20, September 2002.
- "GIDFA: An Industry Unites" - feature article. Games Unplugged Magazine #18, July 2002.
- "Character Sheets: Evoking the Game" - feature article. Games Unplugged Magazine #17, June 2002.
- "Lights, Action, Hack!" - feature article. Games Unplugged Magazine #3, October 2000.
- "Don't Scare Them Off! - Bringing In New Gamers" - article. Pyramid Magazine. July 7, 2000.
- "Serious Gaming" - article. Games & Toys e-zine, BriefMe.com. May 4, 2000.
- "Unplugged and Online!" - article. Games & Toys e-zine, BriefMe.com. April 27, 2000.
- "Far Beyond Four-Color" - article. piiq.com. March 2000.
- "The Reviews are in!" - article. Games & Toys e-zine, BriefMe.com. February 17, 2000.
- "Kingdom of the Console" - article. Games & Toys e-zine, BriefMe.com. December 16, 1999.
- "The Magic from Down Under" - article. Games & Toys e-zine, BriefMe.com. December 9, 1999.
- "The Ideal News Source" - article. Games & Toys e-zine, BriefMe.com. December 9, 1999.
- "a marvelous mythic game" - article. Games & Toys e-zine, BriefMe.com. November 11, 1999.
- "Looking for a Quick Con?" - article. Games & Toys e-zine, BriefMe.com. November 11, 1999.
- "Traveling Along" - article. Games & Toys e-zine, BriefMe.com. November 11, 1999.
- "Gaming - a Box-ed Set" - article. Games & Toys e-zine, BriefMe.com. November 4, 1999.
- "Seek and Ye Shall Find" - article. Games & Toys e-zine, BriefMe.com. November 4, 1999.
- "Industry Insights" - article. Games & Toys e-zine, BriefMe.com. October 28, 1999.
- "The Perils of Penniless Publishing" - column article. RPG.Net webpage. February 20, 1998.
- Stephen R. Donaldson—critical essay. Twentieth-Century Science-Fiction Writers, 3rd Edition. St. James Press, 1995.

== Awards and honors ==
Awards
| Year | Award | Category | Recipients and nominees | Result |
|---|---|---|---|---|
| 2015 | Sidewise Awards | Short Form | Let No Man Put Asunder | Nominated |
| 2013 | Origins Awards | Best Game-related Publication | Eighth Day Genesis: A Worldbuilding Codex for Writers and Creators | Nominated |
| 2011 | Origins Awards | Best Roleplaying Supplement | Sunward: The Inner System | Nominated |
| 2010 | Scribe Awards | Young Adult Novel - Best Adaption | Bandslam: The Novel | WON |
| 2009 | Scribe Awards | Game-related Novel - Best Adaption | World of WarCraft: Beyond the Dark Portal | Nominated |
| 2007 | ENnies | Best Adventure | Lure of the Liche Lord | Gold ENnie |
| 2006 | Origins Awards | Roleplaying Game of the Year | Deryni Roleplaying Game | Nominated |
| 2002 | Origins Awards | Best Game Aid or Accessory | Gamemastering Secrets | WON |
