= GURPS Steampunk =

Role-playing game sourcebook

- Designers: William H. Stoddard
- Publishers: Steve Jackson Games
- Publication: 2000 (1st edition); 2002 (hardcover); 2018 (1.3 edition)
- Genres: Steampunk, Victorian era
- Systems: GURPS

GURPS Steampunk is a role-playing game sourcebook written by William H. Stoddard and published by Steve Jackson Games (SJG) in 2000. The supplement facilitates play in the steampunk genre using the GURPS system. Upon publication, the book won the Origins Award for "Best Roleplaying Supplement". As the most detailed definition of the genre at the time, it was also credited with reifying the attributes of steampunk. GURPS Steampunk was accompanied by licensed publications in the world of Castle Falkenstein and followed by supplements by Jo Ramsay and Phil Masters. Since 2016, SJG has published additional releases in the genre, compatible with GURPS fourth edition.

== GURPS and steampunk ==
GURPS (Generic Universal RolePlaying System), is a tabletop role-playing game system designed to allow for play in any setting, created by Steve Jackson Games in 1986. Steampunk is a science fiction subgenre concerned with 19th-century industrial steam-powered or clockwork machinery, bringing the modern or futuristic concepts of robotics, computers, or other ahistorical machines into the Victorian era.

== GURPS Steampunk ==
GURPS Steampunk was published on November 1, 2000, written by William H. Stoddard, and edited by Alain H. Dawson. Stoddard was an editor for scientific publications and for Prometheus, the Libertarian Futurist Society newsletter. He cites Michael Flynn's Prometheus Award-winning book, In the Country of the Blind, as one of his main inspirations for GURPS Steampunk. Stoddard had previously contributed to other GURPS publications, but this was his first book main author credit. He would later become the president of the Libertarian Futurist Society, and the principal author of other GURPS books, including the fourth edition versions of GURPS Fantasy and GURPS Supers, as well as creating GURPS Social Engineering, which won an ENnie Award in 2012.

GURPS Steampunk is a genre book, providing information about the steampunk setting, and relying on the GURPS Basic Set for much of the game mechanics. It starts with extensive factual information about the Victorian Age, before going into campaign possibilities that arise from steampunk technology and alternative histories and their. It uses the existing GURPS technology level mechanics, but introduces the concept of a diversion, specifically setting most GURPS Steampunk campaigns at TL5+1 (the historical Age of Steam plus the ahistorical innovations, which have many of the effects of later technology levels). It ends with four possible alternate histories for suggested campaigns, each with a date of divergence from real history: Etheria, with interplanetary travel; Iron, a dystopian Marxist industrial timeline; Qabala, with golems; and Providence, with a religious secret society.

GURPS Steampunk received the 2000 Origins Award for Best Roleplaying Supplement. Though not the first, it was the longest and most detailed definition of the steampunk genre to that point, and was followed by a number of steampunk settings for other roleplaying games. It was reprinted multiple times, including in hardcover in 2002, and received a 1.3 version update in 2018.

== GURPS licensed steampunk publications ==
=== GURPS Difference Engine ===
The 1990 novel The Difference Engine by William Gibson and Bruce Sterling is often credited with popularizing the concept of steampunk. In 1991 and 1992, Sterling and Jackson respectively announced GURPS Difference Engine, an adaptation of the setting of the novel for the role-playing game, as "in the works". However the author working on the book died during its development, and although Space: 1889 contributor Mark Clark held discussions with SJG about submitting a proposal, by 1997 the project was defunct.

=== GURPS Castle Falkenstein ===
GURPS Castle Falkenstein
- Designers: James Cambias; Phil Masters
- Publishers: Steve Jackson Games
- Publication: 2000
- Genres: Steampunk, Victorian fantasy
- Systems: GURPS

In the second half of 2000, SJG released another steampunk offering: GURPS Castle Falkenstein, by James Cambias and Masters. Castle Falkenstein is a role-playing game by Mike Pondsmith, and offers Victorian adventure in an alternate history where steampunk technology operates alongside magic, and faerie races enrich the setting. The original game had largely ended production by the time Steve Jackson licensed the property from R. Talsorian Games, and engaged designers with previous experience in both GURPS and Castle Falkenstein to produce the adaptation. According to Masters, the goal of the project was not to adapt Falkenstein's mechanics to GURPS so much as to present its New Europa setting as a backdrop for GURPS players; nevertheless, a new magic system is included to satisfy the setting's unique requirements. and was praised by some critics.

=== GURPS Castle Falkenstein: Ottoman Empire ===
GURPS Castle Falkenstein: Ottoman Empire
- Designers: Phil Masters
- Publishers: Steve Jackson Games
- Publication: 2002; 24 years ago
- Genres: Steampunk, Victorian fantasy
- Systems: GURPS

GURPS Castle Falkenstein: Ottoman Empire, by Masters, was another steampunk offering, released in 2002 under the same license as GURPS Castle Falkenstein. Unlike most GURPS system conversions, this book introduces new material at the frontiers of the New Europa setting that had not been included in R. Talsorian publications, presenting game statistics for the original Castle Falkenstein game as well as GURPS. In his "Designers Notes" for the book, Masters reveals that the book originated in a draft he had written for R. Talsorian before they shut down the line. Masters was therefore able to publish the material he had previously developed, while adding GURPS statistics; in spite of the alternate history and steamtech elements, the book emphasizes the potential of adventures based on the documented culture and history of the Ottoman Empire.

== GURPS third edition steampunk supplements ==
GURPS Steam-Tech
- Designers: William H. Stoddard
- Publishers: Steve Jackson Games
- Publication: 2001; 25 years ago
- Genres: Steampunk
- Systems: GURPS

GURPS Steam-Tech was a 2001 supplement providing ideas, and game statistics, for alternative history inventions for steampunk games. In the style of the historical (GURPS High-Tech and Low-Tech) and futuristic (Bio-Tech and Ultra-Tech) tech guides published for GURPS, Steam-Tech presents fictional machines to be incorporated in a variety of settings and campaigns within the genre. Stoddard selected and compiled the work of 33 authors, including Ramsay and Masters who authored other Steammpunk supplements for GURPS. Developing analytical engines and other counterfactual technologies raised questions about the rules for technological design included in other GURPS publications, and ended up clarifying the machinery rules for GURPS Steampunk.

GURPS Screampunk
- Designers: Jo Ramsay
- Publishers: Steve Jackson Games
- Publication: 2001; 25 years ago
- Genres: Steampunk, Gothic horror
- Systems: GURPS

GURPS Screampunk was a short supplement published in 2001, written by Jo Ramsay, which presented a combination of steampunk and gothic horror elements for roleplaying. This crossover had seldom been touched by previous game publications. Although Gothic horror literature flourished in the decades preceding the Victorian era in which most of the Steampunk genre is set, the book makes the case that invoking Gothic aspects can help compensate for weaker or more superficial aspects of steamtech storytelling. Screampunk was praised by reviewers for the instruction it offered on including gothic horror themes in roleplaying games - advice that was seen as applicable outside of GURPS.

== GURPS fourth edition steampunk supplements ==
Masters was the main author of the following GURPS fourth edition works, published in electronic format.

GURPS Infinite Worlds: Britannica-6 is a steampunk-inspired campaign setting written in 2008, an alternate history world within the GURPS Infinite Worlds game universe. Masters describes it as TL5+2, diesel-electric (rather than steam), and Regency era rather than Victorian.

GURPS Steampunk 1: Settings and Style was an October 2016 book, the first in a numbered series updating the GURPS Steampunk rules for GURPS fourth edition. The intent was to reflect the changes both in GURPS and in steampunk that took place since the original publication in 2000. The book includes a review of sources - both historical and steampunk fiction - and advice on using the setting in a roleplaying campaign.

GURPS Vehicles: Steampunk Conveyances followed in August 2017. While ostensibly part of the GURPS Vehicles series, Steampunk Conveyances is linked in to GURPS Steampunk 1: Settings and Style both thematically and explicitly in the text. It provides fourth edition statistics for a number of vehicles, including some from the original GURPS Steampunk book.

GURPS Steampunk 2: Steam and Shellfire, published in November 2018, is a listing of technological gadgets other than vehicles. It updates old examples to the fourth edition of GURPS while also introducing new ones.

GURPS Steampunk 3: Soldiers and Scientists followed in February 2019. It focuses on steampunk characters, providing notes and creation templates for people from the setting.

GURPS Steampunk Setting: The Broken Clockwork World is a short campaign setting about a steampunk based alternate reality crossing to our world, released in July 2020.

== Reviews ==
- Backstab #27
