= Hong Kong Action Theatre! =

Tabletop role-playing game

1st edition, 1996

2nd edition, 2001, with art by Andrew Baker

Hong Kong Action Theatre! is a martial arts role-playing game published by Event Horizon Productions in 1996. A revised edition was published by Guardians of Order in 2001.

== Description ==
Hong Kong Action Theatre! is a role-playing game based on genre action movies produced in Hong Kong. Players can set adventures in one of three categories: Gunplay, Martial Arts, and Bizarre Fantasy. Adventures are scripted like movies, and the characters take on the roles of actors in the movie.

=== Character generation and further character enhancements (1st edition) ===
In the 1st edition, the player creates a single "actor" that can take on different roles in any of the game's three genres. To begin, the player rolls dice to generate random amounts for the basic attributes of Toughness, Brains, Speed, Cool, and Chi. Each character receives three pools of skill points in the general areas Physical, Mental, and Social. Prior to each adventure, the player buys the skills in each of these areas that will be appropriate for the character's upcoming role in the adventure. Reviewer Rick Swan used the example of a character who in one adventure is a "Veteran Cop" and in another is a "Wise Old Wizard". In the first instance, the player might invest in the skills of Driving, Computers, and Law. In the second, the player might buy Sleight of Hand, Acrobatics and the Occult.

The gamemaster can award a character "Star Points" for exceptional performances, which can then be used by the player to create "script rewrites." For example, if a character is caught in a dangerous situation with no apparent way out, the player can spend the character's Star Points to create in a deus ex machina-like escape.

Each character also has a Signature Move, which, when used at the appropriate moment, will have a positive effect.

=== Combat (1st edition) ===
Each character receives a pool of action points to spend on martial arts maneuvers; the character also receives a Gunplay rating. To resolve a combat action, the gamemaster sets a Difficulty Rating between 10 (easy) and 40 (impossible). The character's relevant ability plus any situational modifiers are subtracted from the Difficulty Rating. The player then must exceed the resulting difference on the roll of a twenty-sided die. For example, a character with a Gunplay rating of 20 attempts to shoot a thrown playing card from a distance of 15 metres. The gamemaster assigns a Difficulty Rating of 30 to the task and further adds a modifier of -4 to the task because the character is swinging upside down from a chandelier. The difference between Difficulty Rating and Ability Total (30-20+4) is 14, which the player must meet or exceed on twenty-sided die in order to successfully hit the falling card.

=== Character generation and gameplay in 2nd edition ===
The second edition of Hong Kong Action Theatre! dispenses entirely with the character generation and combat rules of the 1st edition, and instead uses the Tri-Stat System of role-playing game rules.

== Publication history ==
The small-press company Event Horizon Productions published Hong Kong Action Theatre! in 1996, a 160-page softcover book designed by Gareth-Michael Skarka, with contributions by Aaron Rosenberg, Aaron Sturm, Scott Thompson, David Sturm, J. Christopher Haughawout, Matt Harrop, and John R. Phythyon Jr., and illustrations by Cinema City Entertainment, Golden Princess Amusement, Mandarin Films, Magnum Films, Seasonal Films, Shaw Bros., and Eileen K. Skarka.

The following year, Event Horizon published three supplements: Film Festival #1, To Live and Die in HK, and The Triad Sourcebook.

In 2000, Guardians of Order acquired Event Horizon Productions, and the following year published a new edition of Hong Kong Action Theatre!, a 176-page softcover book written by Nicole Lindroos, Jeff Mackintosh, Chris Pramas, and Lucien Soulban, with contributions by Scott Kessler, John R. Phythyon Jr., David Pulver, and Terry Richards. Cover art was by Andrew Baker, and interior art was by Baker, Grant Harris, Raven Mimura, and Darren Sparling. The new edition used an expansion of the Tri-Stat RPG system. In 2002, Guardians of Order published the supplement Blue Dragon, White Tiger.

After the bankruptcy of Guardians of Order in 2006, the White Wolf imprint ArtHaus acquired some of the company's assets, including the rights to Hong Kong Action Theatre.

== Reception ==
In the November 1997 edition of Dragon (Issue #241), Rick Swan was pleasantly surprised by this book, calling it "a stunner, easily one of the year's best games." He thought the character generation system was "remarkably novel", and called the addition of Star Power and Signature Move "nifty touches." Swan was also impressed by the simple combat system, which he said resulted in "a blur of activity: savage, outrageous, and lightning-fast." Swan concluded by giving this game a perfect rating of 6 out of 6, saying, "Elegant, evocative, and as exciting as a roller coaster ride over a cliff, Hong Kong Action Theatre is a start-to-finish delight."

== Reviews ==
- Backstab #34 (2nd Edition)
- Pyramid (Issue 26 - Jul 1997)
