= GURPS Mecha =

Role-playing game supplement

- Cover art by Dan Smith
- Designers: David Pulver
- Publishers: Steve Jackson Games
- Publication: 1997; 29 years ago
- Genres: Science fiction
- Systems: GURPS

GURPS Mecha is a supplement by David Pulver, published by Steve Jackson Games (SJG) in 1997 for GURPS (Generic Universal Role-Playing System).

== Contents ==
GURPS Mecha is a supplement that allows players and gamemasters to design mecha for use in a GURPS campaign. The book includes a campaign, "Cybermech Damocles" in which the player characters are members of a secret agency fighting alien invaders.

== Publication history ==
In the 2014 book Designers & Dragons: The '80s, game historian Shannon Appelcline noted that Steve Jackson Games decided in the early 1990s to stop publishing adventures, and as a result "SJG was now putting out standalone GURPS books rather than the more complex tiered book lines. This included more historical subgenre books. Some, such as GURPS Camelot (1991) and GURPS China (1991), were clearly sub-subgenres, while others like GURPS Old West (1991) and GURPS Middle Ages I (1992) covered genres notably missing before this point."

GURPS Mecha is one such standalone book, designed to use previously published rules in GURPS Robots (1995) and GURPS Vehicles (1996). It is a 128-page softcover book designed by David Pulver, with additional material by John Nowak, and interior art by Alex Fernandez and Dan Smith. Smith also supplied the cover art. The book was published by SJG in 1997 for use with the 3rd edition of GURPS.

== Reception ==
In the January 1998 edition of Dragon (Issue #243), Rick Swan liked the concept, but warned that the design process required "solid math skills." He concluded, "Clearly this is best-suited for anime fans who aced algebra."

== Other reviews ==
- Alarums & Excursions Issue 262 (June 1997, p.29)
- Ringbote Issue 13 (July/August 1997, p. 11, in German)
