= BESM (disambiguation) =

BESM is a line of Soviet-made mainframe computers.

BESM may also refer to:

- BESm (N^{1}, N^{12}-bis(ethyl)spermine), a derivative of spermine
- Best estimate stress model, a method for estimating rock stress in rock mechanics
- Big Eyes, Small Mouth, a role-playing game
