= Path of the Bold: An Anthology of Superhero Fiction =

Fiction anthology

Path of the Bold: An Anthology of Superhero Fiction is a fiction anthology edited by James Lowder and published by Guardians of Order in 2004.

== Plot summary ==
Path of the Bold: An Anthology of Superhero Fiction is based on Silver Age Sentinels.

== Publication history ==
Shannon Appelcline commented that "the SAS line continued to grow, including the appearance of an anthology of short stories edited by James Lowder. There were eventually two: Path of the Just (2003) and Path of the Bold (2004). These books could have offered Guardians some real upside in comic shops. Besides stories by RPG luminaries like Ed Greenwood and Robin D. Laws, they also featured contributions by comic book stars like Mike Barr and John Ostrander. Path of the Bold even won an Origins Award."

== Reception ==
Path of the Bold: An Anthology of Superhero Fiction won the 2004 Origins Award for Best Fiction Publication.

== Reviews ==
- Review by Rob Lightner (2004) in Amazing Stories, November 2004
