= Tékumel: Empire of the Petal Throne =

Tabletop fantasy role-playing game

Tékumel: Empire of the Petal Throne is a role-playing game published in 2005 by Guardians of Order based on the fantasy world created by M. A. R. Barker.

== Publication history ==
One of the earliest role-playing settings was Tékumel, a fantasy land created by M.A.R. Barker and turned into the role-playing game Empire of the Petal Throne, first by Barker in 1974, and then by TSR, Inc. the following year. It was also republished by Different Worlds Publications in 1987.

In the early years of the 21st century, the Canadian publisher Guardians of Order gained the license to Tekumel, and announced that they would be producing a new version of the setting called Tékumel: Empire of the Petal Throne. However, in late 2004, Guardians of the Order ran into severe financial problems that threatened the project.

In the 2014 book Designers & Dragons: The '90s, author Shannon Appelcline recalled Guardian founder Mark C. MacKinnon's announcement in January 2005 that Guardians of Order had multiple problems and all other employees had been let go, but "Despite that, Guardians published another much-anticipated license, the Tri-Stat Tékumel: Empire of the Petal Throne (2005), in the spring. It was the newest game based in M.A.R. Baker's classic world of Tékumel."

In August 2006, MacKinnon was forced to shut down Guardians of Order, and nothing further in this version of the setting was published.

== Description ==
Tékumel: Empire of the Petal Throne is a 240-page hardcover book designed by Bob Alberti, M. A. R. Barker, Patrick Brady, Steve Charbonneau, Barbara Kennedy, Lisa Leutheuser, Jeff Mackintosh, Victor, Raymond, Joe Saul, and Edwin Voskamp, with artwork by Giovanna Fregni, Llyn Hunter, Eric Lofgren, Jennifer L. Meyer, Raven Mimura, Christopher Miscik, Jesse Mohn, Torstein Nordstrand, Andrew Trabbold, and Ursula Vernon.

The book sets out the rules of a fantasy role-playing game using a variation of the Tri-Stat dX system, and details the lands and peoples of Tékumel created by M. A. R. Barker and outlined in his novels.

== Reception ==
The reviewer from the online second volume of Pyramid called the latest version "the oldest and strangest game to return".
