= Dominion (manga) =

Japanese manga series

- Cover of Dominion issue #1

ドミニオン
- Genre: Science fiction comedy
- Manga
- Written by: Masamune Shirow
- Published by: Hakusensha
- English publisher: NA: Dark Horse Comics
- Magazine: Monthly Comic (1985); Monthly ComiComi (1986)
- Original run: October 15, 1985 – July 26, 1986
- Volumes: 1
- Original video animation

Dominion Tank Police (Note: Retitled as New Dominion Tank Police from episode 5 onwards.)
- Directed by: Kōichi Mashimo (#1–4); Norubu Furuse (#5–10)
- Produced by: Part 1 (#1–4); Kazuhiko Inomata; Ritsuko Kakita; Tamaki Harada; Part 2 (#5–10); Ken Matsumoto; Michihisa Abe; Koji Honda
- Written by: Kōichi Mashimo; Hiroshi Yamaguchi
- Music by: Yoichiro Yoshikawa
- Studio: Agent 21 (#1–4); J.C.Staff (#5–10)
- Licensed by: AUS: Manga Entertainment (1999–2017); NA: Central Park Media (1993–2009, epi.1–4) Manga Entertainment (1995–2013) Maiden Japan (2013–present); UK: Manga Entertainment (1999–2021)
- Released: May 27, 1988 – October 21, 1994
- Runtime: 25–35 minutes (each)
- Episodes: 10
- Manga

Phantom of the Audience
- Written by: Masamune Shirow
- Published by: Seishinsha
- English publisher: NA: Dark Horse Comics
- Magazine: Special Graphix Dominion (ComiComi Special)
- Published: July 1, 1988
- Manga

Conflict One: No More Noise
- Written by: Masamune Shirow
- Published by: Seishinsha
- English publisher: NA: Dark Horse Comics
- Magazine: Comic Gaia
- Original run: February 10, 1992 – June 15, 1993
- Volumes: 1
- Original video animation

Tank S.W.A.T. 01
- Directed by: Romanov Higa
- Produced by: Yutaka Kamata; Romanov Higa
- Written by: Romanov Higa
- Music by: Kazuhiro Chida (Note: Also credited as sound director.)
- Studio: DOGA Productions
- Released: March 24, 2006
- Runtime: 30 minutes
- icon

Dominion (ドミニオン, Dominion) is a Japanese manga written and illustrated by Masamune Shirow. Set in the fictional city of Newport, Japan, in a future in which bacteria as well as air pollution have become so severe that people must wear gas masks when outdoors, the series follows a police squadron that uses military-style tanks.

Dominion has been adapted into three original video animation series: the first, Dominion Tank Police, (Note: Dominion (ドミニオン)) was released in 1988, the second, New Dominion Tank Police (Note: Tokusō Sensha-tai Dominion (特捜戦車隊ドミニオン; lit. 'Special Investigation Tank Squad Dominion')) in 1993, and the third, Tank S.W.A.T. 01 (Note: Keisatsu Sensha-tai Tank S.W.A.T. 01 (警察戦車隊TANKSWAT．01, Keisatsu Sensha-tai Tanku Suwatto Zero Wān; lit. 'Police Tank Squad Tank S.W.A.T. 01')) in 2006. The 1988 OVA is four episodes long and animated by Agent 21, the 1993 OVA is six episodes long and animated by J.C.Staff, while TANK S.W.A.T. is one episode long and was animated by DOGA Productions. The manga was published by Hakusensha, Kodansha and later by Seishinsha. It has been published in English by Dark Horse Comics. The anime has been released in English translation in the United Kingdom and Australia by Manga Entertainment and in the United States by Central Park Media, under their U.S. Manga Corps division. The New Dominion Tank Police series was also distributed in the UK, Australia and United States by Manga Entertainment, but later expired. Maiden Japan licensed the six-episode 1993 New Dominion Tank Police OVA series for distribution in North America in 2013.

== Characters ==
=== The Tank Police ===
Leona Ozaki
Voiced by: Hiromi Tsuru and Rei Sakuma (Japanese); Toni Barry (English)
A young female officer in the Tank Police, she is extremely enthusiastic about her work, and obsessively protective of her tank, which she calls "Bonaparte". Leona was originally an officer in the motorcycle division before requesting a transfer to the Tank Police. Her name, in conjunction with her tank, is likely a reference to the early 19th-century French ruler Napoleon Bonaparte.
Al'Cu Ad Solte
Voiced by: Masaaki Ohkura and Hiroyuki Shibamoto (Japanese); Steve Graf and Adam Henderson (English)
A young male officer, Leona's much calmer partner and co-pilot of Bonaparte. He is very taken by Leona but is always second in her affections behind Bonaparte. He is a very good computer hacker. His name was changed to Al Southwell in English dub.
Charles Brenten
Voiced by: Yuusaku Yara (Japanese); Sean Barrett (English)
Leona's squad leader. Very macho, Charles has little regard for regulations or the health, safety and property of civilians. He is the best shot in the force, preferring a large, old-fashioned revolver (which he lovingly refers to as "the Castigator") to the automatic weapons used by other members of his unit. He has a lifetime subscription to How to Kill magazine. According to Shirow, he is named after the Bren Ten 10 mm handgun, as popularized by the then popular American TV series Miami Vice. In some translations he is known as "Britain", due to an error in translation.
Chaplain
Voiced by: Takkō Ishimori and Kiyoyuki Yanada (Japanese); Peter Whitman and Colin Bruce (English)
An unofficial police chaplain and tank pilot. He once took pity on a criminal, who took advantage by shooting and killing his partner and escaping.
Jim E. Lovelock (Specs, Megane or Four-Eyes)
Voiced by: Shigeru Chiba (Japanese); William Armstrong and William Dufris (English)
A scientific expert and tank commander, his knowledge and insights are often helpful on difficult cases and his calm and logical thinking are critical to crisis situations. He has a friendly rivalry with Chaplain.
Chief
Voiced by: Ichirō Nagai and Kōsei Tomita (Japanese); Jesse Vogel (English)
The chief of police, he is prone to tearing out what little hair he has left, and what is left turned white due to the stress of the job. He has a chronic ulcer that acts up whenever the Tank Police cause too much collateral damage. In arguments with the previous mayor, he comments in the introduction that tanks are insufficient for keeping the peace, and would prefer "replacing our guns with tactical nuclear weapons", though it is unclear if he means this to be taken seriously.

=== Criminals ===
Buaku
Voiced by: Jōji Yanami (Japanese); Marc Smith (English)
The "super criminal" the Tank Police was formed to fight, Buaku is specializing in bank robbery and general mayhem. He leads a gang, but appears to be backed by unknown individuals. Buaku's true origins are unclear between the OVA and the manga itself. In the OVA, Buaku was apparently a "test dummy" for the Greenpeace Crolis project, who escaped destruction when government agents raided the lab and destroyed everything except for encoded data disguised as a nude portrait of himself. He ends up living on the streets and is eventually framed for a bank robbery by an unidentified woman and later arrested by police, which starts the chain of events that led him to become a criminal. In the manga, it is said that Buaku started his criminal career over 80 years ago in Argentina.
In part 1 of the OVA his goal is to retrieve urine samples for a mysterious go-between for the unseen crime boss "Mr. Big". The Tank Police thwarted his plans, but are unable to arrest him.
In part 2 of the OVA he tried to retrieve the encoded data from the Greenpeace experiment, which is on display at a local auction house in Newport. In the manga, his final criminal act is the theft of the Space Colony "Embryo", in which he succeeds and escapes to the stars with his gang, with the exception of the Puma Sisters, who were left on Earth to organize the final getaway.
AnnaPuma and UniPuma
Voiced by: Yūko Mita and Aya Hisakawa (AnnaPuma) and Michie Tomizawa and Niina Kumagaya (UniPuma) (Japanese); Alison Dowling (English)
Anna & Uni are a pair of tall, beautiful blonde android catgirls who were created as "love dolls" to be marketed for profit, but they developed beyond this superficial programming and became criminals, joining forces with Buaku. Except for the occasional spat, they are inseparable and sisterly in the most extreme ways. They despise the series' heroine Leona Ozaki, and the feeling is mutual.
They are vastly superior to humans in terms of strength, agility, speed and ability to take damage. They also have what seems to be the equivalent of military-grade targeting computers. The oddest trait of their construction is that much of their large size is optional. They have the ability to shrink to child-size by expelling large amounts of water (and returning to normal size by ingesting water). When it's discovered their normal size is too big to effectively pilot the tanks, they reveal their ability to become smaller. Many of these traits do not appear much (if at all) in the OVA, but are all featured in the manga.
The sisters cameo in Ghost in the Shell manga chapter "Phantom Fund" and its 2026 anime adaptation, once again voiced by their Japanese New Dominion Tank Police actresses, with Rebecca Wang and Erica Mendez voicing them in English.

=== Others ===
Greenpeace Crolis (or Chloris)
A mysterious green-skinned girl with wings, kidnapped from the Critical Science Development Agency by Buaku's Gang. She is briefly seen in the OVA, but is still an important element for the antagonists to reach throughout the course of the episodes.
The Counselor
Voiced by: Hidekatsu Shibata (Japanese); Sean Barrett (English)
Buaku's client before the Greenpeace incident in Part 1 of the OVA, he provides Buaku's gang with intelligence and "weapons" (vintage tanks) to obtain the urine samples necessary for the completion of Greenpeace.

=== Voices ===
The additional voices in the English dub include Bill Bailey, John Bull, David Graham, Garrick Hagon, Kate Harper, and Peter Marinker.

== Manga ==
=== Dominion ===
The first chapter of the manga was published in 1985 in Hakusensha's magazine Monthly Comic special feature. After that the manga was serialized in Hakusensha's Monthly ComiComi magazine in 1986 and was later released as a single tankōbon in the same year. The plot of the manga is set in the future on a highly polluted Earth. Due to unbearable air quality, the people who inhabit the metropolis of New Port City are forced to wear oxygen masks when outside.

Bandit Buaku, accompanied by two android twins called the "Puma Sisters", tries to capture a top-secret government project that applies a plant's biology to a human's genome allowing for self-oxygenation. In doing so he hopes to prevent the establishment from forcibly changing the human race instead of solving the pollution issue. Captain Brenten and his squadron of Tank Police, composed of officers Leona Ozaki and Al'Cu Ad Solte among others, set out to put a stop to Buaku using their brute military force.

=== Phantom of the Audience ===
An omake (or short story) titled "Dominion: Phantom of the Audience" was originally published as part of a "Special Graphix Dominion" ComiComi special issue in 1988. Seishinsha collected it in the Dominion F volume with a reprint of the original manga on January 27, 1993, and in North America it was published by Dark Horse Comics on March 1, 1994. It involves a fictional sport called "Smartball" and features Leona and the rest of the Tank Police crew.

=== Dominion Conflict One: No More Noise ===
Dominion Conflict One: No More Noise (ドミニオンC1(コンフリクト), Dominion Konfurikuto) was originally published in the Comic Gaia magazine in 1992 and 1993, and one collected volume was published on February 21, 1995, by Seishinsha and in North America in March 1997 by Dark Horse Comics. It is not considered to be part of the same continuity as the original stories.

While the story revolves around Leona Ozaki and the members of the Newport Tank Police, and Conflict One contains some of the same elements as in the original stories, other aspects have been downplayed, altered, or completely removed. Originally planning four Conflict series, Shirow has placed Dominion on hold while he worked on other projects. These included the various Ghost in the Shell anime and Man-Machine Interface. Conflict Two, originally planned for 1997, has yet to be published.

==== New continuity ====
Many elements set Conflict apart from the original Dominion story. Shirow has asked people to think of Conflict as another time line altogether.

- Pollution issues: Newport no longer suffers from the poison smog that kept the city in a haze. Many images in the manga feature skyline shots showing clear skies, and aircraft are much more common.
- Formalization of the Tank Police: The Newport City Police Department is shown as a full station house. The chief is still in command, but many other divisions have been added (including traffic control, investigation, forensics, data processing, and internal affairs), making the unit much more realistic. The Tank Police have been changed and are presented as a much larger organization with a clearly defined role in police operations.
- Bonaparte: With a larger and more structured Tank Police, Bonaparte is no longer a unique vehicle created by Leona. The Kenbitsu Heavy Industries Bonaparte Mark 9 is a modular urban combat vehicle used by all Tank Police platoons.
- Characters: There is a much larger cast, and many previous characters do not appear in Conflict. Missing are Chaplain, Mohican, and the Mayor, as well as Buaku and Greenpeace. Al'Cu Ad Solte, Leona's tank driver and love interest, has also been dropped.

==== Plot ====
Set in November 202X, Conflict One presents the changed Newport City. It is no longer plagued by severe pollution. The story begins with Urushi-maru the "Skyscraper Pirate" and his partner attacking the Nankaiden department store while being pursued by the Osaka Air Police. Tank Police Sergeant Leona Ozaki gets involved when she fires on Urushi-maru's plane, causing the pirate to drop his stink bombs on Nankaiden's rival Hokutenro (the presumed backer of Urushi-maru's attack).

While searching for Urushi-maru, Leona must deal with the selection of the next generation of police tanks, relationship issues, public backlash against the Tank Police, personal rivalries with the current members of her old traffic division, and—to her displeasure—the addition to her unit of the former criminal android AnnaPuma.

==== Characters ====
- Charles Brenten is Tank Police Commander (T-30A). Head of the 3rd Platoon, Brenten is still firmly in control of his reduced unit. As Platoon Commander he oversees three Squads. He is joined in this story by his brother Brady, a pro-wrestler.
- Leona Ozaki is Tank Police Sergeant (T-31-1). Leona is now one of three squad leaders operating under Commander Brenten. A well-known figure in both the Newport Police and the Tank Police Battalion, Leona commands a squad of three Bonaparte-class tanks.
- AnnaPuma is Tank Police Officer (T-31-2). Formerly a member of the Buaku Gang, as an android she was found not to be criminally liable. Assigned to Leona's squad, she becomes Leona's new driver and partner.
- Habana is Tank Police Corporal (T-32-1). Injured earlier in his career, Habana now uses a wheelchair. He is Leona's second in command.
- Shinozaki is Tank Police Officer (T-32-2) and a member of Leona's squad.
- Asada is Tank Police Officer (T-33-1) and a member of Leona's squad.
- Shimizu is Tank Police Officer (T-33-2), member of Leona's squad, and a One-Monther (a fast-track management candidate present only for form's sake).
- Yon is Tank Police Sergeant (T-34-1) and a leader of the 2nd squad. In the original Dominion manga, this character was known as Jim E. "Specs" Lovelock.
- Pak is Tank Police Sergeant (T-37-1) and a leader of the 3rd squad.

== Adaptations ==
=== Original video animations ===
- Dominion Tank Police (1988–1989), animated miniseries directed by Takaaki Ishiyama and Koichi Mashimo
  The first OVA series is a four-part prequel to the original manga, leading up to Buaku's discovery of Greenpeace.
- Dominion Tank Police 2, or New Dominion Tank Police (1993–1994), animated series directed by Noboru Furuse
  New Dominion Tank Police appears to be a direct sequel to the original manga. Leona's Bonaparte has a different color and minor differences to its body show that she had to rebuild it after the initial Bonaparte's destruction. This anime also shows the first animated incarnation of the Fuchikoma, which originally appeared in Masamune's Ghost in the Shell manga.
- Tank S.W.A.T. 01 (2006), animated short film directed by Romanov Higa
  Takes place near the events of the Conflict arc, where the pumas are members of the police department. Unlike in the manga, however, they do not appear to have to reduce their size in order to fit into the driver's section of the tanks.

==== Music ====
The soundtrack album was recommended by the reviewer in Neko. It includes the song "Hey Boy".

=== Role-playing game ===
The Dominion Tank Police Role-Playing Game was published by Guardians of Order in 1999. It uses the Tri-Stat System, with David L. Pulver working on it.

== Reception ==
Helen McCarthy in 500 Essential Anime Movies commented that the 1988 OVA "has some serious themes—ecological disaster and the excessive power of state—but they're delivered lightly, wrapped in a shiny package of action, slapstick, and outrageous visual puns".

The Encyclopedia of Science Fiction described the 1998 OVA as an uneven anime divided into two stylistically distinct halves. It praised the first two episodes as an amusing, broadly farcical production with attractive animation and distinctive urban architecture, while considering the second half more interesting narratively but visually unremarkable. The encyclopedia criticized the latter episodes for introducing themes that were insufficiently explored, with numerous plot elements left unexplained. It also argued that the series' comedic portrayal of police officers as likeable but brutish figures who consider themselves above the law had aged poorly.
