= GURPS Psionics =

Role-playing game supplement

- Cover art by David Patrick Menehan
- Designers: David Pulver
- Publishers: Steve Jackson Games
- Publication: 1991; 35 years ago
- Genres: Science fiction
- Systems: GURPS

GURPS Psionics is a supplement by David Pulver, published by Steve Jackson Games in 1991 for GURPS (Generic Universal Role-Playing System).

== Contents ==
This book explains how psionics rules can be added to any GURPS campaign. Psionics in the GURPS system is treated as a new set of skills grouped into nine categories, purchased when the character is generated, modified by power levels, skill levels, enhancements and limitations. For that reason, the success or failure of psionics is mediated by dice rolls like any GURPS skill. The book also has chapters describing

- creatures of parapsychology such as poltergeists
- psi-tech devices
- psychic combat
- psionic non-player characters, with story hooks and ideas for super-hero, witch-hunting and post-apocalyptic campaigns.
- a complete setting called "The Phoenix Project"

== Publication history ==
GURPS Psionics is a 128-page softcover book designed by David L. Pulver, with interior art by Rick Harris, Charlie Wiedman, Doug Shuler, Evan Dorkin, Angela Bostick, Rick Lowry, and Mike Scott, and cover art by David Patrick Menehan.

In the 2014 book Designers & Dragons: The '80s, game historian Shannon Appelcline noted that Steve Jackson Games decided in the early 1990s to cease publishing role-playing adventures for their GURPS system, and therefore released more standalone books: "Additional universal books also started to appear, including David L. Pulver's GURPS Psionics (1991) and GURPS Vehicles (1993). These books tended to have complex and intricate mechanics — particularly the very mathematical vehicle construction system in the latter book. They would come to define GURPS over the coming years as a serious, technical game."

== Reception ==
In the April 1992 edition of Dragon (Issue #180), Rick Swan called this book "an impressive and wide-ranging smorgasboard of ideas adaptable to horror, science-fiction, and virtually any other role-playing genre." Swan did note that although there were advantages to this generic approach, "those comfortable with rigid class definitions may find the generic approach of the GURPS game to be more frustrating than fun." Swan found the skills-based approach "a bit too much number-juggling for my taste." Swan concluded by giving the book an average rating of 3.5 out of 6, saying, "it works best in a cyberpunk, science-fiction, or modern horror setting... The powers themselves aren't anything out of the ordinary, but their application in terms of role-playing and advanced mechanics makes this the most sophisticated psionics system to date. The sheer volume of material here may give novices a headache, but for experienced players, this may be the system of their dreams."

== Other reviews ==
- Dragão Brasil Issue 41 (August 1998, p.18, in Portuguese)
- Casus Belli Issue 69 (May 1992, p.24)
- Backstab (Issue 1 - Jan/Feb 1997)
- Coleção Dragão Brasil
