= GURPS Technomancer =

Tabletop role-playing game supplement

- Designers: David L. Pulver
- Publishers: Steve Jackson Games
- Publication: 1998; 28 years ago
- Genres: Alternate reality
- Systems: GURPS

GURPS Technomancer is a techno-magic campaign setting by David Pulver, published in 1998 by Steve Jackson Games as for the GURPS role-playing game system.

== Contents ==
GURPS Technomancer provides a setting in an alternative modern Earth where magic co-exists with technology.

The premise of this world setting is that the detonation of the first atomic bomb by the United States triggered a transformation of reality. The mushroom cloud became a permanent magical tornado emitting bolts of red lightning. The resulting wave of magical energy and fallout also modified the genes of countless new-born children. This created both magically apt individuals as well as chimeras — people with some animal traits.

The campaign book contains a post-event timeline; a set of new magic spells suitable for the campaign; rules for mixing magic with modern technology; descriptions of the emergent non-human creatures; 20 character templates for campaign-specific careers; character-building advantages, disadvantages, skills, and equipment; a detailed description of the effects of magic on our society; information on various organizations, and a geography of locations significantly affected by the release of magic.

Listed as requirements to use the book are the GURPS Basic Set (third edition revised) and GURPS Magic (second edition). GURPS Grimoire is also recommended for use in expanding the list of available spells.

== Publication history ==
GURPS Technomancer was published in 1998 by Steve Jackson Games. The book is 128 pages in length with monochrome illustrations and an index. The jacket is stiff paper and is illustrated in color. The book was edited by Sean Punch.

Punch became the new line editor for GURPS in 1995, and Steve Jackson Games began to limit their licensed products and focused instead on more historical books and original settings, which resulted in books such as GURPS Technomancer.

== Reviews ==
- Backstab #14

== See also ==
- List of GURPS books
