= The Complete Druid's Handbook =

Dungeons & Dragons game accessory

- Genre: Role-playing games
- Publisher: TSR

The Complete Druid's Handbook is an accessory for the 2nd edition of the Advanced Dungeons & Dragons fantasy role-playing game.

== Contents ==
The Complete Druid's Handbook presents new kits (including Beastfriend, Hivemaster, Shapeshifter) and spells along with a discussion of sacred groves (druids prefer ponds to streams, because still water is less distracting).

== Publication history ==
The Complete Druid's Handbook was written by David Pulver, and published by TSR, Inc.

== Reception ==
Rick Swan reviewed The Complete Druid's Handbook for Dragon magazine #214 (February 1995) and comments that, of "particular interest to novice players, Pulver uses clear examples to explain the art of playing neutral characters; for instance, a druid won't kill a dragon just because it's evil, but he might if it threatens his forest". Swan concluded by calling the book: "A satisfying entry in one of TSR's most ambitious projects."

== Reviews ==
- Backstab #6
- Envoyer #6
- Casus Belli #111
- Australian Realms #20
