= Glenn Hauman =

American novelist

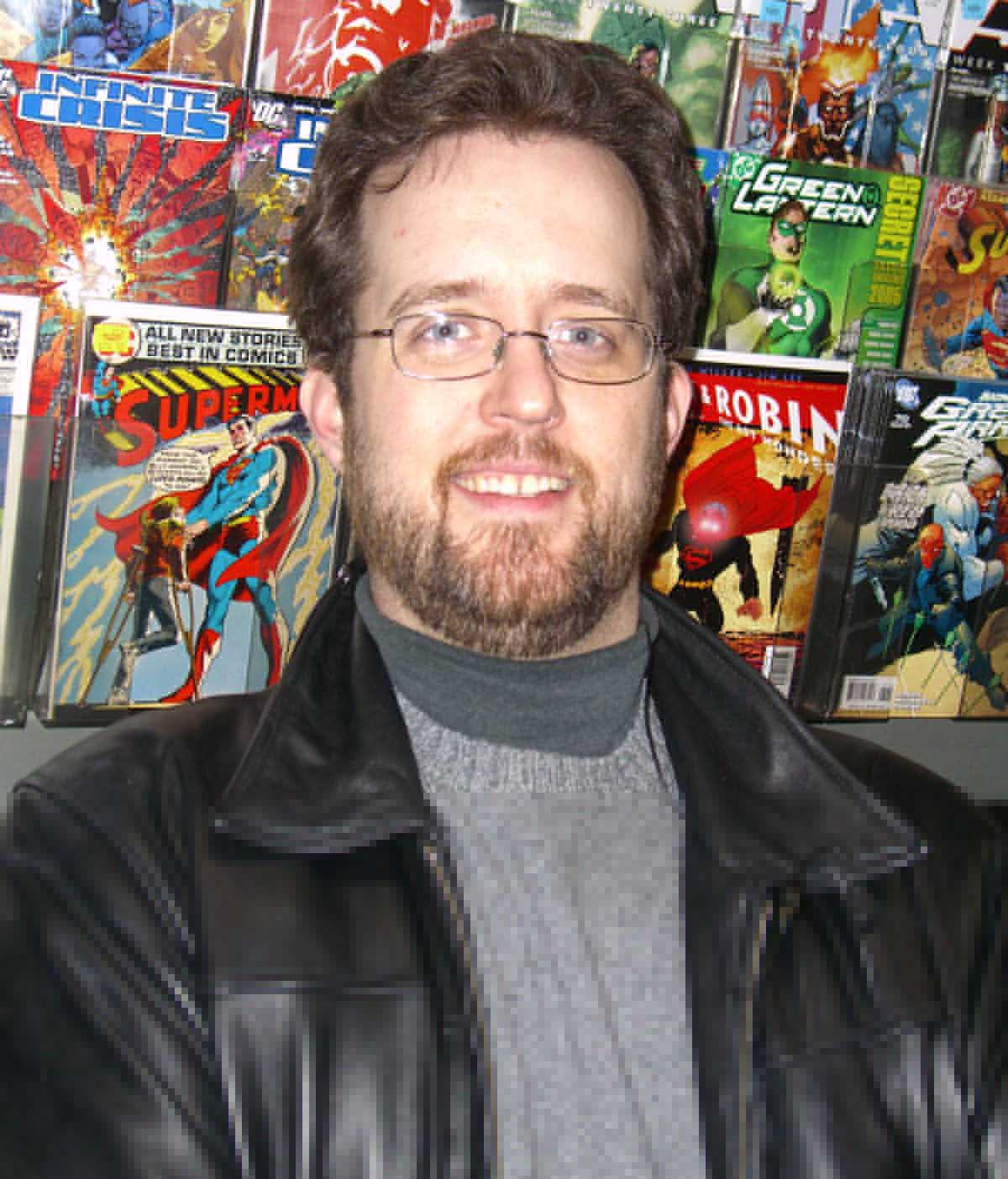
- Hauman at Midtown Comics in Times Square, New York City on February 7, 2007
- Born: March 4, 1969 (age 57)
- Education: New York University
- Occupations: Novelist; short story writer; webmaster; e-publisher; columnist
- Writing career
- Genres: Fiction; Non-fiction
- Subjects: Science fiction Fantasy
- Notable works: Star Trek: New Frontier; Star Trek: Starfleet Corps of Engineers; X-Men; Farscape
- Website: glennhauman.malibulist.com

Glenn Hauman (born March 4, 1969) is an American editor, publisher, writer of novels and short stories, book illustrator, and comic book colorist. He has worked in a variety of roles in print and electronic publishing, including software and website development, as well as his television and novel work within the Star Trek and X-Men franchises.

== Early life ==
Hauman was born on March 4, 1969. He attended New York University, where he became friends with fellow writer David Alan Mack, who would also go on to become a contributor to the Star Trek franchise. While in college Hauman wrote for the student-run humor magazine, The Plague.

== Career ==
Hauman worked was an editorial consultant to Simon & Schuster Interactive for many years, during which he contributed to a number of Star Trek CD-ROMs, such as the Star Trek Encyclopedia, Star Trek: The Next Generation Companion and Star Trek: Deep Space Nine Companion, as well as those for other properties, such as Farscape.

Among Hauman's books are the eBooks Star Trek: Starfleet Corps of Engineers: No Surrender and Star Trek: Starfleet Corps of Engineers: Creative Couplings. Couplings was co-authored with Aaron Rosenberg, and is noteworthy for the first Klingon/Jewish wedding ceremony, for which it was covered on NPR and the Jewish weekly newspaper The Forward. He coauthored the "Redemption" story in the Star Trek: New Frontier anthology No Limits with Lisa Sullivan.

Hauman wrote the short stories "On The Air", which appeared in the anthology Ultimate X-Men, and "Chasing Hairy", which appeared in the anthology X-Men Legends. Both were featured on the Sci-Fi Channel's Seeing Ear Theater. He also contributed to the anthology Urban Nightmares.

He was a founder of Hell's Kitchen Systems, Inc., which was purchased by Red Hat in 2000 for $85.6 million. He was a founder of BiblioBytes, an electronic publishing site, and was called a "young Turk of publishing" in the New York Observer. BiblioBytes was a named plaintiff in Reno v. ACLU, which found the Communications Decency Act unconstitutional. Hauman was also a founding board member of the World Wide Web Artists Consortium, and was the former chair of their Netlaw special interest group.

Hauman is a columnist for ComicMix. He also provided the color art for ComicMix's online publication of Mike Grell's Jon Sable, Freelance, which began in November 2007, and was the Assistant Editor on The Original Johnson, a biographical comic book about boxer Jack Johnson.

He serves as webmaster of the websites of writers Peter David and Robert Greenberger. In April 2011, Hauman joined with Peter David, Michael Jan Friedman, Robert Greenberger, and Aaron Rosenberg in assembling an electronic publishing endeavor called Crazy Eight Press, which would allow them to publish e-books directly to fans. Hauman provided the cover illustration of Peter David's 2012 vampire novel, Pulling Up Stakes.

Hauman has been a featured speaker at numerous industry trade shows, conventions, organization meetings, and the World Science Fiction Convention.

== Legal issues ==
On November 13, 2016, Dr. Seuss Enterprises filed a complaint in California federal court accusing Hauman's website, ComicMix, of violating the intellectual property of Theodor S. Geisel (aka Dr. Seuss) with its crowd-funded book Oh, The Places You'll Boldly Go!, a portmanteau of the Dr. Seuss children's book Oh, the Places You'll Go!, and the phrase to boldly go where no one has gone before, from Star Trek. The lawsuit stated that Hauman's book, which parodies both Star Trek and various Dr. Seuss books, including Oh, The Places You'll Go!, Horton Hears a Who!, How the Grinch Stole Christmas!, The Lorax, and The Sneetches and Other Stories, copied Dr. Seuss' copyrighted work, including recreating entire pages from his books "with meticulous precision." The lawsuit also stated that the book's violation of Dr. Seuss' trademark would create confusion in the minds of the public as to Dr. Seuss's approval or licensing. The defendants maintained that the satirical nature of the ComicMix book is protected under Fair Use. In May 2018, U.S District Court Judge Janis Sammartino found in favor of ComicMix on the issue of Dr. Seuss' trademark, ruling that its book was "a highly transformative work that takes no more than necessary to accomplish its transformative purpose and will not impinge on the original market for Plaintiff's underlying work." In March 2019, Sammartino similarly found in favor of ComicMix on the issue of copyright, ruling that Oh, The Places You'll Boldly Go! was protected under Fair Use. However, in 2021 the 9th Circuit ruled against ComicMix stating “ ComicMix's book wasn't transformative because it didn't have a different purpose or character from Seuss's or alter it with new expression, meaning, or message”. ComicMix agreed to a permanent injunction on distribution in exchange for Dr. Seuss Enterprises not seeking damages.

== Personal life ==
Hauman lives in Weehawken, New Jersey.
