= Demon City Shinjuku Role-Playing Game =

Role-playing game

The Demon City Shinjuku Role-Playing Game is an anime-inspired supernatural horror role-playing game published by Guardians of Order in 1999 that is based on the novel and anime series of the same name.

== Description ==
Shinjuku, the central business district of Tokyo, has been destroyed, killing thousands and driving out the survivors. Most people believe that an earthquake hit the district, and that large organized crime gangs now control the district. Only a few know the truth: The evil sorcerer Levih Rah was responsible for the destruction, and is preparing a ritual that will destroy the entire world. In the mean time, the ruined district has become inhabited by outcasts, criminals, monsters, and ghosts.

The role-playing game uses the Tri-Stat System set of rules developed by Guardians of Order for their first release, Big Eyes, Small Mouth (1997). The book has chapters on character creation, the Tri-Stat rules, the setting, some suggestions for the gamemaster, and two sample adventures:

- "Gangland Rescue": The player characters are members of a biker gang riding by the outskirts of the Shinjuku district when a demon attacks them and disappears with one of the bikers. The bikers must act quickly to rescue their friend.
- "The Infernal Child": The player characters are demons who are guarding a cambion following the defeat of Levih Rah, believing the infernal child is one of the keys to regaining power. The other key is the sword of Levih Rah, guarded by a rival gang of demons. The player characters must prevent the child from being taken by other demons, steal or take the sword, and use both keys to open a Demon Void.

== Publication history ==
In 1988, Hideyuki Kikuchi wrote the novel Demon City Shinjuku, which was immediately adapted into an original video animation (OVA) directed by Yoshiaki Kawajiri. In 1999, Guardians of Order published a licensed role-playing game based on the novel and the OVA, a 152-page softcover book designed by David L. Pulver, who also worked on a number of licensed, standalone games for Guardians of Order. Additional material was provided by Mark C. MacKinnon, Jeff Mackintosh, and Karen A. McLarney.

== Reviews ==
- Pyramid (Sept. 2000)
- Rue Morgue #15
