= The Dominion Tank Police Role-Playing Game =

Tabletop role-playing game

The Dominion Tank Police Role-Playing Game is a role-playing game published by Guardians of Order in 1999.

== Description ==
The Dominion Tank Police Role-Playing Game is based on the Dominion: Tank Police manga, and uses the Tri-Stat System.

== Publication history ==
The Dominion Tank Police Role-Playing Game was published by Guardians of Order in 1999.

David L. Pulver worked on a number of licensed, standalone games for Guardians of Order, including The Dominion Tank Police Role-Playing Game.

== Reviews ==
- Pyramid
