= The Sailor Moon Role-Playing Game and Resource Book =

1998 Role playing game

- Author: Mark C. MacKinnon
- Publisher: Guardians of the Order
- Publication date: 1998

The Sailor Moon Role-Playing Game and Resource Book is an anime role-playing game published by Guardians of Order in 1998 that is based on the anime TV series Sailor Moon.

== Contents ==
The Sailor Moon Role-Playing Game and Resource Book uses the Tri-Stat system. Players create youthful superhero characters who protect humanity from supernatural menaces.

The game attempts to recreate the Sailor Moon TV series, and includes complete write-ups of the five Inner Sailor Moon Scouts, Tuxedo Mask, and the major villains from the first two seasons. Other material includes an overview of Tokyo and the locations used in the TV series, a timeline of the series, and an explanation of public schools in Japan. References are made to other possible settings for a campaign, such as Crystal Tokyo or the Moon Kingdom, but no details are offered.

The book also includes information about the TV series, including 16 full colour pages of illustrations, synopses, episode guides, seiyuu lists and a listing of websites.

== Publication history ==
After the Japanese anime Sailor Moon TV series was translated to English and broadcast in North America in 1995, it became widely popular. The licensed Sailor Moon Role-Playing Game and Resource Book was published by Guardians of the Order in 1998, written by Mark C. MacKinnon.

== Reception ==
The Sailor Moon Role-Playing Game and Resource Book was reviewed in the online second version of Pyramid which said "it was easy to put myself in the shoes of a typical anime fan -- and looking at this book from that point of view, it rocks."

In the Summer 2000 issue of Project JACO, John Stepp wondered who the target audience was for this product, noting, "The target market for the anime series is not a traditional market for RPGs and, while many gamers are anime fans, the Sailor Moon series is not traditional RPG material ... The total package is of limited interest to most gamers. For fans of the series, however, it should be a welcome addition to their collections." Stepp pointed out that the material provided was sparse in certain areas, writing, "The character creation rules allow for male Sailor Knights (such as Tuxedo Mask), but provide extremely little guidance on how they work. There's mention of a villain's campaign ... but there is no source material to support such an effort. Fantastic alternate settings ... are offered as optional campaign locations, but each suggestion admits that you'll have to make it all up yourself." However, Stepp praised the resources provided about the TV series, calling them "a wonderful companion to Sailor Moon ... [it] provides a staggering amount of fannish knowledge, enough that people totally unfamiliar with the show will quickly gain a comprehensive appreciation for it." Stepp concluded by giving this book a rating of 3 out of 5, saying that it "performs admirably as a sourcebook for the show and as an anime-inspired RPG. Sailor Moon fans will be delighted with the illustrations, details, and references provided. Gamers looking to play their own version of the series will find the book invaluable. However, despite its efforts, the Game and Resource Book lacks broad gaming appeal and fails to take advantage of the incredible flexibility inherent in role-playing. Though an exciting initial read, I fear this product will quickly become another placeholder on the bookshelf."

In Issue 14 of the French games magazine Backstab, Timbre Poste thought this product was for Sailor Moon fans only, writing, "For fans, it's great. This is an excellent work that will allow them to reunite with all their friends: Sailor Venus and the two cats, Luna and Artemis... For everyone else, it's best to move on, frankly." Poste concluded by giving the book a rating of 7 out of 10.

In Issue 120 of the French games magazine Casus Belli, Cédric Littardi summarized this as "Simple, unoriginal rules ... Surprising and rich universe ... Very complete background including the first two seasons." Littardi concluded that the game would be a good gift for a younger sister.

== Other reviews and commentary ==
- Knights of the Dinner Table Magazine #29 (March, 1999)
