= Asylum (role-playing game) =

1996 role-playing game

Asylum is a dystopian post-apocalyptic near-future role-playing game published by Clockworks in 1996.

== Contents ==
Asylum is a post-apocalyptic role-playing game set in the United States in the near future. It was published in 1996 as a 176-page perfect-bound softcover book, designed by Aaron Rosenberg, and edited by Alex Kolker and Amy Sparks, with cover art by Rosenberg and John Berg.

In this world of the near future, volcanic eruptions have blanketed the earth with clouds, resulting in an endless night that has killed most vegetation and animals. The few surviving humans have been driven mad due to light deprivation, and one of the last acts of the U.S. government before it collapsed was to create city-sized insane asylums. It is in one of these asylums that the game takes place.

Rather than rolling dice, random chance is generated by drawing two different colored marbles from a pool of ten, then consulting tables for the result.

== Reception ==
In the January 1998 edition of Dragon (Issue #243), Lester Smith was intrigued by the concept, but was less enthused about the game's physical presentation, finding the interior layout "pretty primitive", with "mostly amateurish art, interspersed with a scattering of muddy phiotos with no real connection to the text." Smith also found the game mechanics "troublesome", especially use of colored marbles in place of dice; Smith pointed out that none of the tables in the rules listed all the possible color combinations. "This makes game play frustrating, with marbles being drawn and redrawn until a match that the tables can handle comes up. Dice would have done the same job much more easily, if less uniquely." Smith also found "The writing is unclear in many places, and difficult to reference during play, despite the inclusion of indices. Everything is so scattered, and tables are so visually indistinct, that searching through the book is something like scanning snow flurries." However, despite the problems, Smith still thought "the setting alone is worth the price of admission. This is a world worth gaming in ... In all, the game is not bad as a designer’s first effort. With some mechanics development, another editing pass, and a professional layout, it would rock."

== Reviews ==
- The Unspeakable Oath #16/17 (2001 Digest)
