= Sailor Moon Collectible Card Game =

Collectible card game

- Cardback of Sailor Moon CCG
- Designers: Marc C. MacKinnon
- Publishers: Dart Flipcards Inc.
- Players: 2
- Playing time: Approx 20 min
- Chance: Some
- Age range: 10+
- Skills: Card playing Arithmetic; Basic Reading Ability

The Sailor Moon Collectible Card Game is an out-of-print collectible card game set in the fictional world of Sailor Moon. The game, based on the English version of the anime and designed by Mark C. MacKinnon, Jeff Mackintosh, Karen McLarney, and John R. Phythyon, Jr., was released in July 2000 by Dart Flipcards.

== Game summary ==
The Sailor Moon Collectible Card Game pits teams of Sailor Soldiers (referred to as "Scouts") against opposing monsters and villains. Each player has both one or more Scouts, and a collection of enemies. Victory is achieved by either eliminating all of an opponent's scouts, or by defeating a certain number of victory points (VP) worth of monsters and villains.

At some points in the game, elements of random chance are introduced by requiring the players to play a game of jan ken pon in order to determine the outcome.

== Card types ==
- Scouts / Knights - The heroes of the game, they serve both to attack opponent's monsters or villains and as the target of enemy attacks. Scouts start at level 1 but can be upgraded by playing the appropriate higher level card (similar to the evolution mechanic in the Pokémon Trading Card Game).
- Monsters / Villains - Cards symbolizing monsters or specific villains from the anime. The more powerful the adversary, the more victory points the card is worth when defeated.
- Events / Items - Cards representing events which are taking place, or special accessories. These cards have a temporary effect and are then discarded after being used.
- People - Personalities who influence the game in some way. They are persistent, in that their effect can be used each turn.
- Power - Cards which supply Body, Mind, or Soul power. This power is attached to cards and used to fuel special abilities and attacks.
- Locations - Introduced in the expansion set, these cards represent locations which are associated with villains and monsters. They provide a bonus to the enemy.

== Cards and rarity ==
The base card set in the Sailor Moon Collectible Card Game consists of 160 different cards. Of these, 60 are common, 60 are uncommon, 30 are rare, and 10 are ultra-rare foil cards. The odds of getting an ultra-rare foil card in a booster are 1 in 12.

The following starter packs and booster packs are available:

Sailor Moon Collectible Card Game Products
Product	Cards	Other comments / notes
Starter deck	60	Two 30-card mini-decks, meant for two players.
Character deck	60	Themed around a single character (e.g. Sailor Mars).
Booster pack	11	Includes 1 rare, 3 uncommons, and 7 commons.

The game also features a 70-card expansion set, Sailor Moon: Past and Future. This set includes 20 commons, 20 uncommons, 20 rares, and 10 ultra-rares.

== Reception ==
The game won the 2000 Origins Award for Best Trading Card Game.
