= Silver Age Sentinels =

Tabletop superhero role-playing game

- Designers: Stephen Kenson, Mark C. MacKinnon, Jeff Mackintosh, Jesse Scoble
- Publishers: Guardians of Order
- Publication: 2002 (both editions)
- Genres: Superhero fiction
- Systems: Tri-Stat dX (variant) d20 System

Silver Age Sentinels is a superhero role-playing game (RPG) published in 2002 by Guardians of Order, creators of Big Eyes, Small Mouth, an anime-themed RPG.

== History ==
Guardians of Order moved into the d20 market beginning with their new superhero role-playing game, Silver Age Sentinels (2002), which was written by Mark C. MacKinnon, Jeff Mackintosh, and Jesse Scoble, with Steve Kenson and was developed by Lucien Soulban. Silver Age Sentinels was produced in both a Tri-Stat edition in July 2002 and then a d20 edition released at GenCon 35 later that year. James Lowder, who had experience with packaging fiction for Green Knight Publishing, moved to assembling book packages for other game companies, including some Silver Age Sentinels fiction for Guardians of Order (2003-2004). After Guardians of Order went out of business in 2006, White Wolf bought the IPs for some of the company's games, including Silver Age Sentinels. White Wolf's ArtHaus imprint holds the rights to Silver Age Sentinels.

Dyskami Publishing Company, founded by Mark C. MacKinnon in 2013, has come out with Absolute Power, billed as the second edition of Silver Age Sentinels.

== Description ==
Silver Age Sentinels features an original game world inspired by classic "four-color" DC and Marvel comic book series, updated to modern political and moral sensibilities. The Empire City Universe (referred to after its central location, an alternative version of New York City) has a distinctive history.

The original system is a variant of the Guardians of Order Tri-Stat system, later ported into a generic form called Tri-Stat dX. It expands the system, adding additional modifiers to allow more customized powers and characters. It also uses the ten-sided die (d10) as its base die as opposed to the six-sided dice (d6) used in Guardians of Order's previous RPG titles.

A d20 version, using a similar power creation structure modified for compatibility with the d20 System line, was released two months after the Tri-Stat version. Many of its concepts were adapted to the d20 version of Big Eyes, Small Mouth.

The original Deluxe version is a full color hardcover, while the Unlimited version is a hardcover with a full color cover only. Silver Age Sentinels d20 System version is also hardcover with a black and white pages. The d20 Stingy Gamer Edition was softcover.

The game is also the foundation for The Authority Role-Playing Game, a game based on Warren Ellis's The Authority. That game features a much higher power level, and uses twelve-sided dice (d12) as its main action resolution.

Two anthologies of creator-copyrighted short stories tied to the SAS universe were published by Guardians of Order. Path of the Just (2003) featured an introduction by Denny O'Neil and included stories by John Ostrander, Steven Grant, and Ed Greenwood. Path of the Bold (2004) featured an introduction by Elliot S! Maggin and included stories by Robert Weinberg, John Kovalic, and Mike W. Barr. Both anthologies were edited by James Lowder.

== Reviews ==
- Pyramid - Deluxe Limited Edition
- Pyramid - d20 Edition
- Backstab #43
