= The Authority Role-Playing Game =

Tabletop superhero role-playing game

The Authority Role-Playing Game is a role-playing game published by Guardians of Order in 2004. It was written by Jesse Scoble, John Chambers, John Snead, and Matt Forbeck.

== Description ==
The Authority Role-Playing Game is based on Warren Ellis's The Authority comic book. The game uses Silver Age Sentinels as a foundation, but features a much higher power level, and uses twelve-sided dice (d12) as its main action resolution.

== Publication history ==
The Authority Role-Playing Game was published by Guardians of Order in 2004.

== Reviews ==
- Pyramid

RPG.net Review: A Higher Authority
