= Film Festival 1 =

1997 role-playing game adventure book

Cover art, 1998

Film Festival #1 is an adventure published by Event Horizon Productions in 1997 for the action-adventure role-playing game Hong Kong Action Theatre!

== Description ==
Film Festival #1 is a 120-page perfect-bound softcover book containing 15 adventures for the Hong Kong Action Theatre! role-playing game. The adventures were written by Gareth-Michael Skarka, John R. Phythyon Jr., David Brandon Sturm, Matt Harrop, and Aaron Rosenberg, and are evenly divided between Hong Kong Action Theatre!'s three genres: Gunplay, Martial Arts, and Bizarre Fantasy.

=== Gunplay ===
- "Two Fisted Justice"
- "To Catch a Thief"
- "Last Chance"
- "Full Auto"
- "Dead On Arrival"

=== Martial arts ===
- "Five Fists of Kung Fu"
- "Five Fists of Kung Fu II: Martial Fury"
- "Police Target"
- "Deadly Relations"
- "The Beat"

=== Bizarre fantasies ===
- "Son of the Dragon II: Dragonfist"
- "Magic Hunter"
- "Dragonknights"
- "The Mighty Heroes"
- "Ghost Ship"

The book also includes a movie title generator.

== Reception ==
In the February 1998 edition of Dragon (Issue #244), Rick Swan acknowledged he was already a fan of the Hong Kong Action Theatre! RPG, and thought Film Festival 1 "presents 15 top-notch adventures." Swan's favorites were "Five Fists of Kung Fu", and "Magic Hunter".
