= The Glory of Rome =

Dungeons & Dragons supplement

- Author: David Pulver
- Publisher: TSR
- Publication date: 1993

The Glory of Rome is an accessory for the Advanced Dungeons & Dragons fantasy role-playing game.

== Contents ==
The Glory of Rome lays out guidelines for moving the AD&D game to the Roman Empire. In terms of character classes, mages and psionicists are not available, and fighters can become legionaries, gladiators, and charioteers. Equipment changes as well, for example a short sword becomes a gladius in ancient Rome, and magic works differently.

== Publication history ==
The Glory of Rome was designed by David Pulver, and released by TSR, Inc. Editing was by Mike Breault and Thomas M. Reid, with illustrations and icons by Roger Raupp.

== Reception ==
Rick Swan reviewed The Glory of Rome for Dragon magazine #205 (May 1994). Swan praised the book for "some of the year's most literate writing and meticulous research, courtesy of ace designer David Pulver". He felt that the "unstable political climate—which may be inflamed by senatorial PCs—makes Rome an ideal setting for military campaigns. The Roman gods get a cold shoulder, and the gazetteer should've been ditched in favor of a few adventure outlines; otherwise, this is the most satisfying entry in TSR's Historical Reference series."

== Reviews ==
- Australian Realms #16
