= Ex Machina (role-playing game) =

Tabletop role-playing game

- Cover of the Ex Machina Tri-Stat Cyberpunk Genre Book.
- Designers: Bruce Baugh, Rebecca Borgstrom, Christian Gossett, Bradley Kayl and Michelle Lyons
- Publishers: Guardians of Order
- Publication: August 2004
- Genres: Cyberpunk, Postcyberpunk
- Systems: Tri-Stat d8, d20 System

Ex Machina is a cyberpunk role-playing game book published by Guardians of Order covering a range from classic cyberpunk to postcyberpunk. It exists under both the cinematic Tri-Stat dX and d20 RPG systems.

== Setting ==
Ex Machina includes a detailed retrospective on the cyberpunk genre, as well as lengthy advice on how to convey that genre in a role-playing environment without losing touch with its core themes.

In addition to information on setting design and genre handling, Ex Machina also includes four complete game settings for gamers to choose from, each of which takes the Cyberpunk genre in its own unique direction. The settings are named Heaven Over Mountain, Underworld, IOSHI and Daedalus.

== System ==
There are two variants of the system for Ex Machina; Tri-Stat d8 and the d20 System.

=== Tri-Stat d8 ===
Under Tri-Stat the game uses point-based character design and a two-die task resolution system. The game engine focuses on story over rules, and is known for its flexibility.

=== d20 System ===
The d20 System variation combines the points-based special abilities of Tri-Stat with the classes and levels of d20, and uses a hybrid task system mostly built from the d20's single-die high-roll method. The d20 variant is based on the Big Eyes, Small Mouth game system. This variant is solely a fan-based production, and not endorsed by "Guardians of Order".

== Current status ==
According to the Guardians of Order website, the company went out of business in 2006. The "Guardians" staff have not released any information regarding the Tri-8 system or Ex Machina licensing.

== Reviews ==
- Pyramid
