= David L. Pulver =

Canadian game designer

- Education: Queen's University at Kingston
- Occupations: Author; game designer
- Writing career
- Genres: Fantasy; science fiction

David L. Pulver is a Canadian freelance writer and game designer, author of more than fifty role-playing game rulebooks and supplements, including the award-winning Transhuman Space.

== Early life and education ==
Pulver has a History BA from Queen's University.

== Role-playing game designs ==
In a 2010 interview, Pulver stated that although he has been doing work for Steve Jackson Games (SJG) "ever since I became a freelance writer," he also worked for TSR, Game Designer's Workshop, West End Games, Iron Crown Enterprises, and White Wolf Publishing, before his significant contribution to the Guardians of Order catalogue. He is a fan of anime and manga.

In 1989 Pulver designed the first version of GURPS Ultra-Tech, an equipment guide intended to be used with science fiction settings. Pulver contributed adventures to several anthologies published for GURPS, and also designed GURPS Psionics (1991) followed by GURPS Vehicles (1993). The latter featured a mathematically complex vehicle-construction system, allowing the creation of vehicles ranging from a stone-age canoe to faster-than-light starship. This system was later simplified for GURPS Traveller (especially GURPS Traveller: Starships and GURPS Traveller: Ground Forces) and GURPS World War 2 (including GURPS WW2: Motorpool). The design rules in GURPS Robots (1997) and GURPS Mecha (1997) are fully compatible with it. Pulver also produced two original game settings for SJG at this time: GURPS Reign of Steel (1996) and GURPS Technomancer (1998).

In November 1998, fellow Canadian Mark MacKinnon brought Pulver on to Guardians of Order, and Pulver took the lead in developing Big Eyes, Small Mouth from its simple beginnings to become a more complex game, including a skill system and vehicle rules. Pulver was at the same time working on additional licensed games, including The Dominion Tank Police Role-Playing Game (1999), Demon City Shinjuku Role-Playing Game (2000), and Tenchi Muyo! (2000). Pulver and John R. Phythyon, Jr. designed the gangster samurai game Ghost Dog (2000), using the Tri-stat system and based on the film Ghost Dog: The Way of the Samurai. Continuing his interest in science-fiction, he also wrote Centauri Knights (2001), the first original setting from Guardians of Order. Pulver continued to write for Guardians almost to the point when they ceased publication, notably contributing to their anthologies Ex Machina (2004) and Dreaming Cities (2005).

Meanwhile, Pulver continued his 20-year relationship with Steve Jackson Games. He contributed to GURPS Traveller and GURPS World War 2 lines, and created Transhuman Space (2002), a new science fiction setting and game line for GURPS. Pulver assisted Sean Punch with the fourth edition of GURPS beginning in September 2002, and with releases from 2004 to 2009. His vehicle design rules for the fourth edition of GURPS were released in GURPS Spaceships (2007).

== Work in other media ==
Steve Jackson and David Pulver coauthored a novella, Thera Awakening, that was distributed with the Interplay computer game Stonekeep. This novella describes the backstory and history of the Stonekeep world and characters and was completed before the game was finished.

Pulver was the guest of honor at the 1992 U-Con gaming convention (held annually at the University of Michigan).

== Writing credits ==
=== GURPS third edition ===
- All-Star Jam 2004
- Bio-Tech
- Cyberpunk Adventures (winner of the 1992 Origins Award for Best Roleplaying Adventure)
- Fantasy Adventures
- GURPS Lite for Transhuman Space
- Mecha
- Psionics
- Reign of Steel
- Robots
- Space Atlas IV
- Special Ops, 2nd edition
- Technomancer
- Time Travel Adventures
- Transhuman Space (winner of the 2003 Grog d'Or Award for Best Role-playing Game, Game Line or RPG Setting.)
  - Deep Beyond
  - The High Frontier
- Traveller Alien Races 1, 2, 3, and 4
- Traveller: Ground Forces
- Traveller Planetary Survey 6: Darkmoon
- Traveller: Star Mercs
- Traveller: Starships
- Ultra-Tech and Ultra-Tech II
- Vehicles 1st and 2nd editions
- Vehicles Expansion I
- Vehicles Expansion II
- Vehicles Lite
- Y2K

=== GURPS fourth edition ===
- GURPS Mass Combat (2009)
- GURPS Banestorm: Abydos (2008)
- GURPS Basic Set 4th edition
- GURPS Bio-Tech 2nd edition
- GURPS Spaceships (2007)
- GURPS Ultra-Tech 4th edition

=== Other game systems ===
- Aliens and Artifacts
- The Authority Role-Playing Game
- Big Eyes, Small Mouth
  - BESM Dungeon
  - Big Eyes, Small Mouth (main rulebook) 2nd edition and 3rd editions
  - Big Robots, Cool Starships
  - Centauri Knights
  - Hot Rods and Gun Bunnies
- Bubblegum Crisis: Before and After
- AD&D 2nd Edition
  - The Complete Druid's Handbook
  - The Glory of Rome
- Cybor Gladiators
- d20 System
  - BESM d20 Role-playing Game
  - Centauri Knights d20
  - d20 Mecha
  - d20 Military Vehicles
- Demon City Shinjuku Role-playing Game and Resource Book
- Dominion Tank Police Role-playing Game and Resource Book
- Dreaming Cities
- Escape from Monster Island
- Ex Machina
- Gamer's Handbook of the Marvel Universe 1992 Character Updates
- Ghost Dog Role-Playing Game and Resource Book
- Indiana Jones and the Rising Sun
- Tenchi Muyo! Role-playing Game and Resource Book
- Tri-Stat dX core role-playing system
