= Death in Freeport =

2000 role-playing adventure published by Green Ronin Publishing

Death in Freeport is a 2000 role-playing game adventure published by Green Ronin Publishing.

== Contents ==
Death in Freeport is the first adventure that was published for the Freeport series.

== Publication history ==
Three companies started d20 System publishing off on August 10, 2000, by releasing their adventures the same day: The Wizard's Amulet (2000) from Necromancer Games, often described as the first d20 product as the PDF was published in the few minutes of August 10 and was the first d20 supplement in wide release); Three Days to Kill (2000) from Atlas Games was available for sale locally a week before the convention but only officially went on sale that year at Gen Con which made it the first d20 supplement in print; and Death in Freeport (2000) was available a few hours later at Gen Con.

Aside from being the first d20 publication from Green Ronin, Death in Freeport went on sale on the same day that the new Dungeons & Dragons third edition Player's Handbook (2000) became available, and according to Shannon Appelcline commenting on the first three d20 system adventures, "Of the three adventures, Death in Freeport may be the most notable. It defined a new campaign setting, the city of Freeport, and was also the first in a connected trilogy of d20 adventures. Death in Freeport was also a different sort of D&D adventure: it played like d20 crossed with Chaosium's Call of Cthulhu (1981), complete with cultists, ancient gods, and even player handouts. The crossover was quite explicit, with cultists of Yig and the Yellow Sign being among series antagonists." The original adventure was soon followed by the rest of the trilogy over the next several months, Terror in Freeport (2000) and Madness in Freeport (2001).

== Reception ==
Death in Freeport won the Origins Awards for "Best Roleplaying Adventure of 2000".

Death in Freeport won the 2001 ENnie Award for "Best Adventure".

== Reviews ==
- Pyramid
- Polyhedron #147 (July, 2001)
- Envoyer (German) (Issue 67 - May 2002)
- Backstab #26 (as "Mort à Freeport")
- Coleção Dragon Slayer
