= GURPS Bio-Tech =

Tabletop role-playing game supplement for GURPS

- First edition cover
- Designers: Steve Jackson; David Pulver; David Morgan-Mar
- Publishers: Steve Jackson Games
- Publication: 1997 first edition; 2006 second edition
- Genres: Science fiction
- Systems: GURPS

GURPS Bio-Tech is a GURPS (Generic Universal Role Playing Game) sourcebook that implements biotechnology in the game. The first edition of the book was written for GURPS third edition, and the second edition was written for GURPS fourth edition. Both editions of the game are primarily focused on providing supplemental rules, campaign material, and examples of the uses of biotechnology for the players and gamemaster alike. The second edition contains two outlines for campaign settings (Alexander Athanatos and Draconis) but is primarily focused on providing rules and examples of devices that gamemasters could adapt for use in their own campaigns.

GURPS is a roleplaying game where players and gamemasters can, and are encouraged to, create whatever characters and settings they choose. GURPS Bio-Tech allows the inclusion of the elements of biotechnology into games. The books contain rules and advice for creating a wide variety of possible characters, scenarios, storylines, and campaigns that are influenced by either real-world theories and practices of biotechnology, or the science fiction of advanced genetic alteration, enhancement, and augmentation.

== Content ==
GURPS Bio-Tech includes a detailed introduction into biotechnology, speaking about both its practices in a real-world sense, and its applications in science fiction and fantasy. In addition to new and supplemental rules for the game, the book goes into great detail discussing what the world would (potentially) be like if biotechnology were to continue to advance. Anti-aging treatments, human (and nonhuman) augmentation and enhancement, chemical warfare, cloning, and many other subjects are detailed, along with advice for gamemasters should they wish to implement such things into their games. Because GURPS is meant to be open-ended for the gamemaster to develop their own setting, many possibilities are left open for their interpretation, such as potential social and political ramifications of these advancements. How does the general public react to extreme modification? What religious concerns does it bring up? How does humanity deal with the population increase caused by anti-aging treatments? GURPS Bio-Tech leaves the answers to these questions up to the gamemasters, allowing them to weave such elements into their stories as much or as little as they desire. This is also the first 4th edition book to make significant changes to the page layout introduced with the fourth edition, most noticeably with a return to a two column layout.

== Publication history ==
Second edition cover

The first edition of GURPS Bio-Tech was written by David L. Pulver, and published by Steve Jackson Games, as a 144-page book. The first edition of GURPS Bio-Tech was published in 1997, by Steve Jackson Games. A second edition was published in 2006 for GURPS fourth edition. The second edition was written by both Pulver and David Morgan-Mar. Pulver has written a number of books for GURPS in both its third and fourth editions. Morgan-Mar is a regular contributor to Pyramid Magazine, Steve Jackson Games' online game and hobby magazine, and has co-written several books for GURPS fourth edition.

== Reception ==
Joe Kushner reviewed the first edition of GURPS Bio-Tech in Shadis #48. Kushner comments: "Overall the book is very clear and easy to use. The majority of the text has comments by various individuals which make it easier to read. The art is all done by Dan Smith, so even if you don't like his art, it still has a uniform feel to it."

=== Awards ===
It was an Origins Award nominee as Best Roleplaying Game Supplement in 2007.

== Reviews ==
- Backstab #8
- InQuest Gamer #36

== See also ==
- List of GURPS publications
