= Trojan War: Roleplaying in the Age of Homeric Adventure =

Role-playing game supplement

Trojan War: Roleplaying in the Age of Homeric Adventure is a 2004 role-playing game supplement published by Green Ronin Publishing.

== Contents ==
Trojan War: Roleplaying in the Age of Homeric Adventure is a supplement in which new classes, spells, weapons, character stats, and campaign guidance are presented for epic Bronze Age battles under the watchful eyes of the gods.

== Reviews ==
- Pyramid
- Backstab #49
