= GURPS Robots =

Role-playing game supplement

- Cover art by John Zeleznik
- Designers: David Pulver
- Publishers: Steve Jackson Games
- Publication: 1995; 31 years ago
- Genres: Science fiction
- Systems: GURPS

GURPS Robots is a supplement for GURPS (Generic Universal Role-Playing System). Written by David Pulver, it was published by Steve Jackson Games in 1995.

== Contents ==
GURPS Robots includes rules for players to design robots, and then use them as player characters in a GURPS campaign. Several sample robots are provided for the gamemaster. Although there are no full adventures in the book, several ideas for campaigns are presented.

== Publication history ==
In the 2014 book Designers & Dragons: The '80s, game historian Shannon Appelcline noted that Steve Jackson Games decided in the early 1990s to stop publishing adventures, and as a result "SJG was now putting out standalone GURPS books rather than the more complex tiered book lines. This included more historical subgenre books. Some, such as GURPS Camelot (1991) and GURPS China (1991), were clearly sub-subgenres, while others like GURPS Old West (1991) and GURPS Middle Ages I (1992) covered genres notably missing before this point."

GURPS Robots is one such standalone book, a 128-page softcover designed by David Pulver, with interior art by Dan Smith and Denis Loubet, and cover art by John Zeleznik. It was published by SJG in 1995 for use with the 3rd edition of GURPS.

== Reception ==
In the January 1996 edition of Dragon (Issue #225), Rick Swan was highly impressed by this book, calling it a "stunner of a GURPS supplement." He did warn that the process of robot design "isn't for the faint of heart: designing a complex robot can take up a good chunk of a weekend." However, for players willing to dive in, Swan concluded, "Prepared to be dazzled."

Jim Swallow reviewed GURPS Robots for Arcane magazine, rating it a 7 out of 10 overall, and stated that "Author David L Pulver has come up with some really keen ideas on both the technology and gaming fronts. The chapters on roleplaying in a robot-oriented campaign are good but the strength of the book is the occasional stand-out concept that just begs to be integrated into a science-fiction gameworld. A construction worksheet and robot character sheet would have been a good idea, but beside that and the odd teeny error in the bibliography, GURPS Robots is neat. However, it's only a dedicated referee who'll use more than half of this. Death to the fleshy oppressors!"

== Other reviews ==
- Ringbote #13 (July/August 1997, p.11)
- Australian Realms #26
