= Tenchi Muyo! (role-playing game) =

Role-playing game supplement

Tenchi Muyo! is a role-playing game published by Guardians of Order in 2000, based on the 1992 Tenchi Muyo! Ryo-Ohki (天地無用! 魎皇鬼) anime series.

== Description ==
Tenchi Muyo! is a role-playing game that uses the Tri-Stat System of role-playing game rules. Players can take on the roles of any of the main characters in the anime series, even the villains. Alternatively players can make up their own characters.

== Publication history ==
In 1992, Masaki Kajishima created the six-part OVA Tenchi Muyo! Ryo-Ohki. In 2000, Guardians of Order acquired the license to create a role-playing game. David L. Pulver, who had worked on a number of licensed, standalone games for Guardians of Order, also designed this 200-page softcover book, with contributions by Karen McLarney, and artwork by McLarney and Jeff Mackintosh. It was published in 2000.

== Reception ==
Tenchi Muyo! was reviewed in the online second version of Pyramid which said "Based on the Tri-Stat system (first published in Big Eyes, Small Mouth), TM!RPGaRB is a complete RPG. You don't have to buy anything else to dive into the game. This may cause some grumbling from those who don't want to buy multiple versions of the same game mechanics, but for licenses such as this it makes perfect sense."

== Reviews ==
- The Guildsman, Issue 7 (Fall 2000)
