= GURPS Ultra-Tech =

Role-playing game sourcebook

- First edition cover art by John Zeleznik
- Designers: David Pulver
- Publishers: Steve Jackson Games
- Publication: 1989; 37 years ago
- Genres: Science fiction
- Systems: GURPS

GURPS Ultra-Tech is a sourcebook published by Steve Jackson Games (SJG) in 1989 for science fiction role-playing games using third edition GURPS (Generic Universal Role-playing System) rules.

== Description ==
GURPS Ultra-Tech is written for gamemasters running science fiction campaigns using the third edition GURPS rules. The equipment is listed in increasing levels of technology. In game terms, the book contains chapters on equipment from Tech Level 8 (near future) to Tech Level 16 (miraculous technology of the distant future).

== Publication history ==
SJG published GURPS, a set of universal role-playing rules, in 1985, and followed that with many genre sourcebooks, as well as a second and third edition of the general rules. Following the release of the third edition in 1988, SJG published GURPS Ultra-Tech the following year, a 128-page softcover book designed by David Pulver, with interior art by Michael Barrett, Albert Deschesne, Karl Martin, Michael J. Scott, and Dan Smith, and cover art by John Zeleznik.

A second edition was released in 1991, and this was repackaged and re-released in 1996. A sequel, Ultra-Tech 2, also designed by David Pulver, was released in 1997.

Following publication of the fourth edition of GURPS in 2004, a greatly expanded third edition of Ultra-Tech was published in 2007, a 240-page book designed by Pulver and Kenneth Peters, with interior artwork by Jesse DeGraff, Igor Fiorentini, Simon Lissaman, Drew Morrow, Jon Netherland, Aaron Panagos, Christopher Shy, Bob Stevlic, and new covert art by John Zeleznik.

== Reviews ==
- ''Backstab #6
- Coleção Dragão Brasil
