= Mark C. MacKinnon =

Canadian politician and game designer

- Occupations: entrepreneur and designer of roleplaying games
- Notable work: founded Dyskami Publishing Company

Mark C. MacKinnon is a Canadian politician, entrepreneur, and designer of roleplaying games.

MacKinnon is the founder of Guardians of Order (GoO), and has produced work in the anime genre. His initial release, Big Eyes, Small Mouth, led the company to aggressively license anime properties. With the help of David L. Pulver and others, MacKinnon gradually turned the Tri-Stat System into a universal system, including martial arts, superhero, cyberpunk and urban fantasy games. MacKinnon shut down GoO on August 1, 2006, due to mounting financial difficulties, leaving many writers and artists unpaid.

== Career ==
Mark C. MacKinnon wanted to create a general anime role-playing game system, to have the kind of game that he would like to run, so he formed Guardians of Order to publish his anime role-playing game. MacKinnon got the name "Guardians of Order" from one of his characters from an Amber Diceless Roleplaying game run by Jesse Scoble. Guardians of Order released the Big Eyes, Small Mouth (1997) anime game created by MacKinnon at Gen Con 30. With the success of BESM, MacKinnon wanted to try a licensed property and obtained the rights for Sailor Moon in January 1998 and used most of that year to design The Sailor Moon Role-Playing Game and Resource Book (1998). MacKinnon hired David L. Pulver to work for Guardians of Order in November 1998. MacKinnon developed the Sailor Moon Collectible Card Game, which was published by Dart Flipcards. MacKinnon wanted to grow Guardians of Order in 2000, and started by hiring John R. Phythyon, Jr. MacKinnon decided in 2002 that Guardians would need to publish using the d20 System to stay in business, so MacKinnon, Jeff Mackintosh and Jesse Scoble wrote the superhero role-playing game Silver Age Sentinels (2002) with Steve Kenson and developed by Lucien Soulban. Guardians began having financial problems after the d20 crash in 2003, and on January 3, 2005, MacKinnon announced that the company had multiple problems resulting in Guardians being downsized to only himself. George R.R. Martin announced the end of Guardians of Order on July 28, 2006, which MacKinnon publicly confirmed on August 1. MacKinnon ultimately left the game industry and went into real estate sales.

In 2013, MacKinnon founded Dyskami Publishing Company and returned to game publishing with a Kickstarter for the board game Upon a Fable. MacKinnon later published under Dyskami additional original board games and other licensed tabletop games based on the Sailor Moon Crystal Japanese anime series.

In 2014, MacKinnon was elected as Ward 6 Councillor for Guelph City Council for a four-year term. He was re-elected in 2018.

June 2019, MacKinnon announced the return of BESM for a Fourth Edition under Dyskami Publishing Company. MacKinnon served as the primary author for the new edition. In 2021, he launched a crowdfunding campaign on Kickstarter for Anime 5E, the using Dungeons & Dragons 5th edition rules.
