= Dark Inheritance =

Role-playing game supplement

Dark Inheritance is a 2003 role-playing game supplement published by Mythic Dream Studios for d20 Modern.

== Contents ==
Dark Inheritance is a supplement in which powerful beings come to the modern world.

== Reviews ==
- Pyramid
- Backstab
- Fictional Reality (Issue 13 - Sep 2003)
- Realms of Fantasy
