= Jesse Scoble =

Canadian game designer

- Occupation: Game designer

Jesse Scoble is a Canadian game designer who has worked primarily on role-playing games.

== Career ==
Jesse Scoble was a gamemaster for Mark C. MacKinnon, and Scoble became an employee of Guardians of Order a few years after MacKinnon started the game company. Scoble designed the El-Hazard Role-Playing Game (2001), one of the games based on licensed properties by Guardians of Order. The superhero role-playing game Silver Age Sentinels (2002) was written by MacKinnon, Jeff Mackintosh and Scoble, with Steve Kenson and developed by Lucien Soulban. He wrote the world bible for the Silver Age Sentinels superhero game line. Scoble oversaw the development of the role-playing game based on A Song of Ice and Fire, which was published as A Game of Thrones (2005). He was creative director on the award-winning A Game of Thrones RPG. He has contributed to more than two dozen books, including two short-story anthologies (based on Silver Age Sentinels), and several books for White Wolf. He has also worked as a web content writer for NCsoft, crafting Web and event fiction for a series of massively multi-player online games, including City of Heroes, Dungeon Runners, and Exteel. After living for a year in Texas, Scoble returned to Canada to work freelance and work on writing screenplays.
