= Steven Marsh (game designer) =

American role-playing game designer

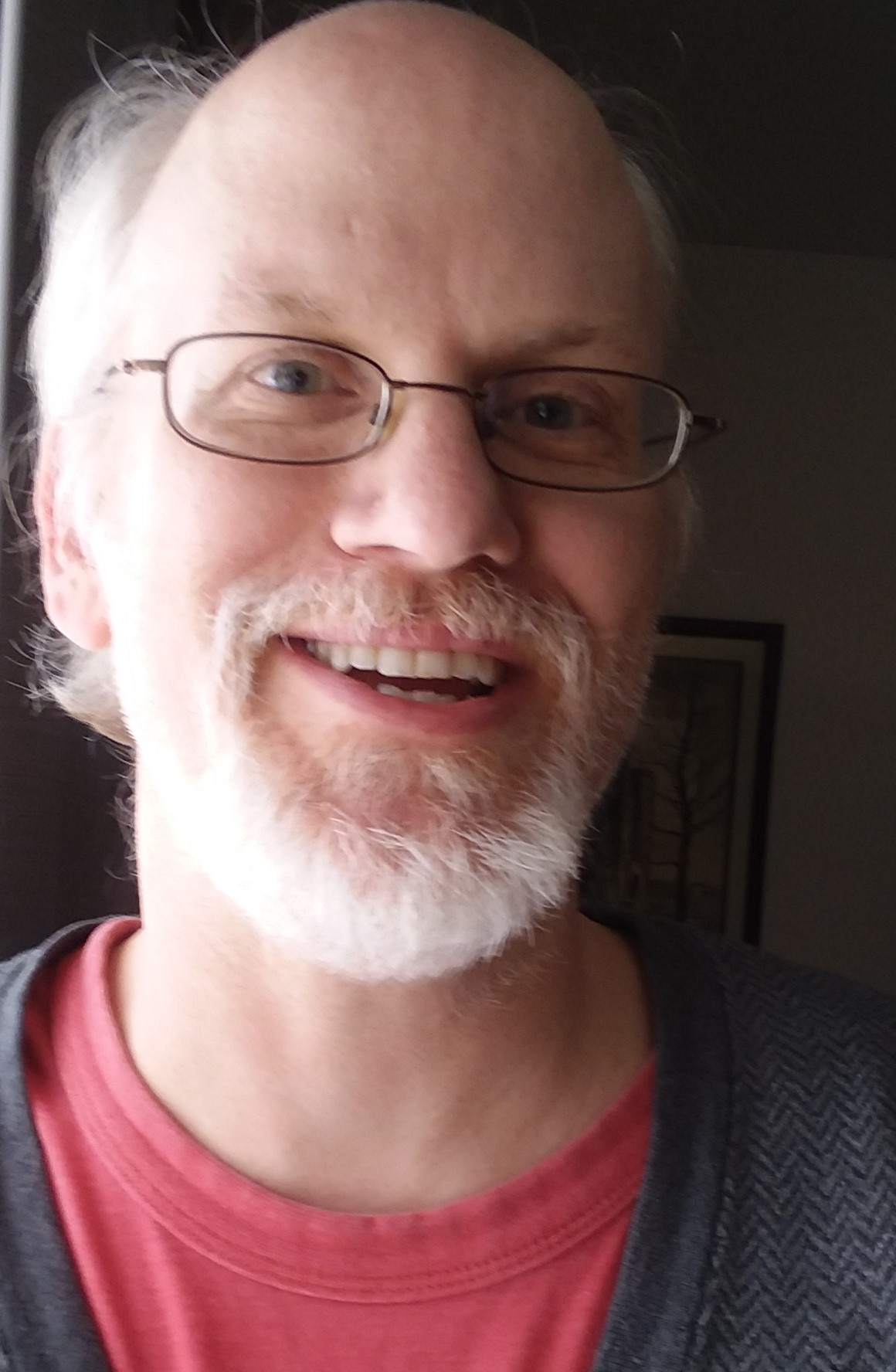
- Occupation: Game designer
- Website: www.waitingforgo.com

Steven Marsh is a game designer who has worked for Steve Jackson Games.

== Career ==
Like many game industry professionals of the 1990s, Steven Marsh was first involved in periodicals; a letter he wrote to Shadis Magazine about what would be a "perfect issue" was translated into the special "Steven Marsh" issue. He was subsequently hired by Steve Jackson Games to be the editor of the second (online) and third (.pdf) incarnations of Pyramid.

Steven Marsh has worked for Steve Jackson Games as e23 Manager as well as Pyramid Editor. In addition to writing for SJG's GURPS and In Nomine lines, Marsh also contributed to Green Ronin Games's Mutants and Masterminds RPG, West End Games's D6 System, and White Wolf's Werewolf: the Forsaken, as well as Fright Night: Polar Terror for the D20 system.
