= Dart Flipcards =

Canadian company

Dart Flipcards Inc. is a Canadian company based in St. Laurent, Quebec. The company is known for marketing mini lunch boxes and trading cards based on licensed properties. The lunch boxes were filled with chewing gum and were assembled in Canada from Chinese-made tins. Dart Flipcards Inc. currently specializes in outsourcing and offshoring consultancy.

== Licensed properties featured on Mini Lunch Boxes ==
=== Music ===
Aaron Carter, Kiss, Ozzy Osbourne

=== Television ===
The Brady Bunch, Buffy the Vampire Slayer, Charmed, Hamtaro, The Osbournes, The Outer Limits, Pokémon, Rudolph the Red-Nosed Reindeer, Smallville, South Park, Stargate SG-1, Survivor, Witchblade

=== Film ===
Army of Darkness, Rocky

=== Sports ===
National Hockey League

=== Other ===
Baby Huey, Casper & Wendy, Felix the Cat, Hot Stuff the Little Devil, Mighty Mouse, Pink Panther, Richie Rich, Sonic the Hedgehog, The Little Rascals, The Three Stooges

== Trading cards ==
The company also published trading cards. Each set consisted of approximately 72-100 cards and were typically based on licensed properties.

- A Vietnam War fact card set in 1988
- A FernGully: The Last Rainforest set in 1992
- A Pepsi-Cola set in 1994
- A Hershey's Chocolate set in 1995
- A Battlestar Galactica set in 1996
- A Smokey Bear set in 1996
- A Titanic set in 1998
- A Sailor Moon set in 2000
- A Shrek set in 2001
- A Crocodile Hunter set in 2002
