= Jeff Mackintosh =

Role-playing game designer

- Born: January 22, 1971
- Died: September 24, 2016 (aged 45); Kingston, Ontario
- Occupation: Game designer

Jeffrey Ian "Jeff" Mackintosh (January 22, 1971 – September 24, 2016) was a game designer and writer who worked primarily on role-playing games.

== Early life ==
Jeffrey Ian Mackintosh was born in 1971, the son of Ian and Dorothy Mackintosh.

== Career ==
Jeff Mackintosh joined the Big Eyes, Small Mouth team at Guardians of Order in late 1999, and did the full color layouts for the second edition (2000) of the core rules. The Silver Age Sentinels (2002) superhero role-playing game from Guardians of Order was written by Mark C. MacKinnon, Mackintosh and Jesse Scoble. Graphic designer Adam Jury continued from Mackintosh on the licensed BESM books in 2002.

Jeff Mackintosh died from glioblastoma multiforme on September 24, 2016.
