= Big Eyes, Small Mouth =

Anime-themed tabletop role-playing game

- Third edition core rulebook
- Designers: Mark C. MacKinnon
- Publishers: Dyskami Publishing Company/Japanime Games
- Publication: 1997 (1st edition); 2001 (2nd edition); 2007 (3rd edition); 2020 (4th edition)
- Genres: Anime
- Systems: Updated Tri-Stat System

Big Eyes, Small Mouth (BESM) is a tabletop role-playing game originally produced by Guardians of Order in 1997 that was designed to simulate the action of anime and manga. The title alludes to the common anime drawing style of characters with large expressive eyes and comparatively small mouths.

== Gameplay ==
BESM uses a point-based character creation system. Players roll two 6-sided dice, add 10 to the total and then divide the resultant sum between Mind, Body, and Soul, against which all action checks are made. These are supplemented by Attributes, which can be positive (Acrobatics) or negative (Easily Distracted), giving the characters unique abilities.

== First edition ==
The initial edition, designed by Mark C. MacKinnon, was released by Guardians of Order in 1997. Soon after that, RPG writer David L. Pulver began writing supplements for what was essentially a fairly simple game, adding a detailed system for the creation of mecha with his book Big Robots, Cool Starships. Skills were added with the next supplement, a genre book called Hot Rods & Gun Bunnies. At the same time MacKinnon and his colleagues were using BESM's system (now referred to as "the Tri-Stat System") as the basis for licensed games based on anime properties such as Sailor Moon, Dominion: Tank Police, Demon City Shinjuku and Tenchi Muyo! All of these innovations were incorporated into a second edition, which was released in 2001 to a very strong reception.

The first edition was a slim, grey-covered book. A vast promotion and beta test was organized, and included a number of demo-team members from around the world.

Since then, the other anime licenses that Guardians of Order obtained used the BESM system as their core rules. Instead of publishing complete games as they had done previously, the licensed books were published as "Ultimate Fan Guides". In addition, several genre based supplements were published for the game, as well as two original settings: Centauri Knights and Uresia: Grave of Heaven.

=== Reception ===
In the January 1998 edition of Dragon (Issue 243), Rick Swan dismissed BESM as "a stripped-down, entry-level RPG." Swan pointed out that the rules were primarily focussed on character creation, "but that’s pretty much all you get. There’s little in the way of background material, campaign outlines, or staging tips, making this more of an introduction to roleplaying than a ready-to-play game." He did not recommend the game, saying, "Hardcore anime might be better off investigating the Bubblegum Crisis game by R. Talsorian."

Two issues later, in the March 1998 edition of Dragon (Issue 245), Lester Smith gave an enthusiastic review, saying, "In a hobby where, all too often, games seem to be published without a clear vision of their topic or audience... BESM stands out as an example of a product that knows its subject and treats it right." Smith's only criticism was weapon damage, pointing out that since there are no penalties for wielding the largest weapon dealing the most damage, why wouldn't everyone simply choose the largest weapon? He also warned that combat can drag on if both players have good defences. Smith concluded, "For fans of anime, then, I highly recommend the Big Eyes, Small Mouth RPG. It is just about perfect for what it sets out to accomplish. Even if you aren’t anime fan, I recommend that you give the game a look anyway. It might just introduce you to a whole new world of adventure."

== d20 edition ==
A version of BESM adapted to the d20 System was published in 2003. Sales were good but the critical response was mixed. New versions of Centauri Knights and Uresia were released under the new version. A later revised edition of this version was published in 2004, which, due to errors in the proofing and printing processes, did not contain the full set of revisions in its final published form. Company president Mark C. MacKinnon offered a public explanation and apology, and offered to refund buyers who were dissatisfied with their purchase of the book.

== BESM 3rd Edition ==
The third edition of BESM was scheduled to be released in April 2006 after Mark C. MacKinnon had announced that the release would be delayed from its original release in the Summer of 2005. The third edition was at that time planned to come in three forms: BESM 3rd Edition (deluxe), BESM 3rd Edition (standard) and Vanilla BESM, an inexpensive and simplified variant created to introduce non-RP gamers. Mark MacKinnon announced that as of August 1, 2006, Guardians of Order was going out of business, and that "BESM Third Edition is finished and ready for press. Another company will be publishing it and providing future support. It's the most elegant version of BESM and the Tri-Stat System that I have put together and am very proud of it. If you pre-ordered the book from us, more information will follow."

On September 9, 2006, ArtHaus Games, whose titles are published by White Wolf Publishing, announced that it had acquired the RPG. The announcement stated that the company was "extremely confident" that a release date of January 2007 would be met, and confirmed that those who pre-ordered and prepaid for the book would be "in good hands", though they also stated that they had not taken on Guardians of Order's liabilities.

BESM 3rd Edition was released by ArtHaus on January 24, 2007. The new edition featured a change in the Tri-Stat game mechanic from a "roll-under" to the "roll-over and hit a target number" found in other games. The book was standard 8.5 × 11 in format and featured full color interior art. The Deluxe Edition was not released, and ArtHaus did not announce any plans to follow up with further releases or the previously-announced Vanilla BESM.

== BESM Fourth Edition ==
On April 29, 2019, Dyskami Publishing Company announced that they had entered into a worldwide licensing arrangement with White Wolf Entertainment to produce a new edition of BESM. The new edition was to be written and updated by its original designer (and Dyskami founder), Mark MacKinnon, and co-published with tabletop game publisher Japanime Games. In addition to the regular and deluxe BESM Fourth Edition, Dyskami also announced plans to publish a stripped-down core role-playing game called BESM Naked, that would be a complete, stand-alone, alternate edition that could fully integrate with BESM Fourth Edition but presented as a "gateway product". After a successful crowdfunding campaign on Kickstarter, Dyskami Publishing Company released complete PDF files of multiple BESM Fourth Edition products to the product's backers on December 23, 2019, including the core and Naked RPGs, game screen, adventures, character folio, and sample characters. The BESM Fourth Edition product line was sent to the printer in January 2020 and had its worldwide consumer and retailer release in October 2020. A second Kickstarter campaign in December 2020 ushered in the release of six additional game expansions for the line, featuring BESM Extras – a book dedicated to optional rule variations and expanded game mechanics.

To coincide with the digital BESM Fourth Edition launch, Dyskami Publishing Company also announced plans during the Kickstarter campaign to launch a community content PDF program on DriveThruRPG called Tri-Stat Emporium, whose name alludes to the Tri-Stat System generic role-playing game system used in all editions of BESM thus far. The Tri-Stat Emporium launched on June 8, 2020.

== Ultimate Fan Guides ==
Starting in 2001, Guardians of Order replaced the company's previous practice of producing stand-alone games for anime series for which they had obtained licenses with Ultimate Fan Guides — a series of supplements for BESM which combine information on the episodes, characters and themes of anime series with statistics and game information for those series.

The Ultimate Fan Guide series was controversial among BESM fans. Although the books were usually well put-together and almost always featured many full-color pages with stills from the series involved, many fans believed the information provided in certain guides was incomplete and unreliable. In addition, there were occasional editing errors that led to embarrassing omissions.

Many anime series whose first RPG treatment was in the Ultimate Fan Guides series were also adapted to the d20 System edition of Big Eyes, Small Mouth. The Slayers guides were adapted into a stand-alone d20 game under the title The Slayers d20.

Due to licensing consideration, the three-volume set of fan guides for Slayers does not include any information from the movies and OVAs distributed by ADV Films. This means that there has never been an official BESM writeup for Naga the Serpent, a popular character who does not appear in the television series.

== Publications ==
=== Core books ===
- Big Eyes, Small Mouth Second Edition
- Big Eyes, Small Mouth Revised Second Edition
- Big Eyes, Small Mouth Retro Second Edition (both regular softcover edition and hardcover collector's edition)
- Big Eyes, Small Mouth Third Edition
- BESM Fourth Edition (both regular edition and a deluxe limited edition)
- BESM Naked (Fourth Edition): a stripped-down version of the regular Fourth Edition

=== Expansions (First and Second Editions) ===
- Big Eyes, Small Mouth Fast Play Rules: A free guide for Tri-Stat System RPG.
- Hot Rods and Gun Bunnies: Action-adventure guide.
- Big Robots, Cool Starships
- Centauri Knights: A hard science future campaign.
- BESM GM Screen
- Cute and Fuzzy Seizure Monsters/Cute and Fuzzy Cockfighting Seizure Monsters: Guide for Pet Monster Trainers and Pet Monster. Different titles are used for alternate cover page.
- Big Ears, Small Mouse: American animation and comic guide.
- BESM Character Diary: A mecha design and combat supplement for BESM First Edition and the Tri-Stat System.
- BESM Fantasy Bestiary: Fantasy campaign guide.
- BESM Dungeon: Dungeon hack style guide.
- BESM Space Fantasy: Space action and romance guide.
- Cold Hands, Dark Hearts: Gothic horror theme guide.

=== Expansions (Fourth Edition) ===
- BESM Extras: optional and expanded rules
- BESM Multiverse: official multi-genre setting book
- BESM Game Screen: includes an adventure
- BESM Character Folio: enhanced character sheets
- BESM Primer: Introductory fast-play rules
- BESM Ikaris: epic fantasy world setting sourcebook
- BESM Uresia – Grave of Heaven: irreverent fantasy world setting sourcebook
- BESM Dramatis Personae: NPC collection
- BESM Denizens of the Multiverse Deck: accessory deck for NPCs and monsters
- BESM Adventures – Volume #1: introductory scenario
- BESM Tokyo Sidekick: NPC collection from the Tokyo Sidekick board game
- BESM 2D-Animinis: cardboard standees
- BESM Dice Tower: cardboard constructible dice tower and two neoprene dice trays
- BESM Dice: eight six-sided dice

=== BESM d20 ===
It is a series for the d20 System with BESM theme.

- BESM d20 Revised Edition
- Uresia: Grave of Heaven d20: A fantasy campaign.
- BESM d20 Monstrous Manual
- BESM d20 Character Folio
- Centauri Knights d20: A hard science future campaign.
- BESM d20 Advanced Magic: Magic system supplemental.

== Reception ==
The reviewer from Pyramid #30 (March/April, 1998) stated that "Big Eyes, Small Mouth succeeds, with fun and style. It really is the anime game to get."

== Reviews ==
- Knights of the Dinner Table Magazine #13 (Nov., 1997)
- Games Unplugged #4 (Dec./Jan., 2000)
- Backstab #9
- Backstab #24 (second edition)
- Backstab #45

== See also ==
- Tri-Stat dX
