= Guardians of Order =

Canadian publisher of roleplaying games

- Company type: Private
- Industry: Role-playing game publisher
- Founded: 1996; 30 years ago
- Defunct: August 2006
- Fate: Bankrupted
- Headquarters: Guelph, Ontario, Canada
- Key people: Mark C. MacKinnon, David L. Pulver, Jeff Mackintosh, Adam Jury, Jesse Scoble, Lucien Soulban
- Products: Big Eyes, Small Mouth, Silver Age Sentinels, Tri-Stat system

Guardians of Order was a Canadian company founded in 1996 by Mark C. MacKinnon in Guelph, Ontario. The company's business output consisted of role-playing games (RPGs). Their first game is the anime inspired Big Eyes, Small Mouth. In 2006 Guardians of Order ceased operations due to overwhelming debt.

== History ==
In 1996, Mark C. MacKinnon founded Guardians of Order—named in reference to a character he had made playing Phage Press' Amber Diceless Roleplaying (1991)—to publish his anime game, Big Eyes, Small Mouth (1997). The game's minimalistic mechanics, known as the Tri-Stat System, were also influenced by Amber. At the time, there was no other generic anime roleplaying game besides the more comedic Teenagers from Outer Space, as most anime RPGs were based on licenses.

In 1998, Guardians of Order hired David Pulver. In 1999, Jeff Mackintosh was hired; and 2000 brought in Liz Fulda, Lucien Soulban, and John R. Phythyon Jr. In 2002, Guardians of Order launched their "Magnum Opus" program, licensing the company's intellectual property to third parties to create new games. By 2005, Guardians of Order downsized to just Mark C. MacKinnon.

Between February 14, 2006 and August 1, 2006 there were no official updates to the Guardians of Order website. There was speculation on the official forums that the company was out of business. On July 28, 2006 a post to George R. R. Martin's official web site announced that Guardians of Order was out of business. In response, on August 1 Mark MacKinnon posted confirmation that Guardians of Order "ceased operations." According to MacKinnon the company had too much debt. MacKinnon attempted to place Guardians of Orders games with other companies, and promised that existing orders would be filled. The company officially closed their doors August 1, 2006.

On September 9, 2006 ArtHaus Games, whose titles are published by White Wolf Publishing, announced that it had acquired the third edition of Big Eyes, Small Mouth which was slated to be released in April 2006. The announcement stated the company was "extremely confident" that a release date of January 2007 would be met and confirmed that those who pre-ordered and prepaid for the book would be "in good hands," though it was also said that they have not taken on Guardians of Order's liabilities.

On March 7, 2007 George R. R. Martin wrote that he had regained control of his intellectual property rights and was "all square" with Guardians of Order. As part of their settlement, Mr. Martin received all remaining stock of the limited-edition version of the RPG. No further information regarding the settlement was revealed, nor the status of other creditors' claims on the property.

== Tri-Stat dX system ==
The Big Eyes, Small Mouth game used the Tri-Stat System. The system would later be modified for use in other games and be more generally named the Tri-Stat dX system. Most of Guardians of Order's games use some form of the Tri-Stat dX system.

== Publications ==
After Big Eyes, Small Mouth, Guardians of Order would go on to achieve significant success with another anime-based Tri-Stat dX game, The Sailor Moon Role-Playing Game and Resource Book. The game was built on Big Eyes, Small Mouth but featured an extensive reference to the Sailor Moon universe. Guardians of Order similarly acquired licenses to create Tri-Stat dX role-playing games for other anime series, including Dominion, Demon City Shinjuku, and Tenchi Muyo!.

After the last of these, El Hazard, the company's strategy with licensed anime series changed and it began issuing "Ultimate Fan Guides" which served the same purpose while avoiding the need to reprint the same Tri-Stat dX mechanics. All of these books included game statistics for characters in the series as well as extensive episode guides and character summaries.

Guardians of Order expanded beyond anime based games when the Tri-Stat dX system was adopted for the superhero game Silver Age Sentinels. Guardians of Order later acquired the rights to publish the Amber Diceless Roleplaying Game from Phage Press. Guardians of Order also licensed the rights to produce Tri-Stat dX role-playing games based on The Authority, Tékumel, and A Song of Ice and Fire.

=== Original properties ===
==== Big Eyes, Small Mouth ====
- Big Eyes, Small Mouth - Guardians of Order's original game had four revisions before the company went out of business, with the third edition being in development and published by another company.
  - Core rules
    - Big Eyes, Small Mouth (1997) - 94 black and white pages.
    - Big Eyes, Small Mouth Second Edition (2000) - 280 full color pages
    - Big Eyes, Small Mouth Retro Second Edition (2024) - 336 full color pages
    - Big Eyes, Small Mouth Third Edition (2007) - 280 full color pages, released by ArtHaus publishing
    - (for Fourth Edition please see Big Eyes, Small Mouth)
  - Expansions
    - Big Robots, Cool Starships (1999) - Rules for science fiction anime-inspired games, especially those featuring mecha.
    - BESM Game Master's Screen (2000)
    - Cute & Fuzzy Seizure Monsters (2000) - Rules for pet monster battling style games, inspired by cartoons like Pokémon. Also published as Cute & Fuzzy Seizure Monsters due to censorship concerns.
    - Hot Rods & Gun Bunnies (2000) - Rules for modern day action adventure anime-inspired games.
    - Centauri Knights (2001) - Science fiction setting
    - Big Ears, Small Mouse (2001) System for playing small cartoon animals such as Rescuers, Capitol Critters, etc.
    - Uresia: Grave of Heaven (2003) fantasy setting
    - BESM Dungeon (2003) - Additions to BESM for running more fantasy oriented anime-inspired games.
    - Cold Hands, Dark Hearts (2003) - Rules for playing supernatural monsters in a gothic horror setting.

==== Other Tri-Stat games ====
- Silver Age Sentinels (2002) - Superhero role-playing game. Based on modified BESM rules using ten-sided dice instead of six-sided dice.
- Tri-Stat dX (2003) - a small generic role-playing system based on BESM.
- Ex Machina (2004) - Cyberpunk role-playing game using the Tri-Stat rules.
- Dreaming Cities (2005) - Urban fantasy role-playing game
- Reality Storm (in conjunction with Hero Games)

==== d20 System ====
- Silver Age Sentinels d20 (2002)
- BESM d20 (2003)
- BESM d20 Revised Edition (2004)
  - Expansions
    - Uresia: Grave of Heaven for BESM d20 (2003) fantasy setting
    - Mecha d20 (2003) - Also usable as an expansion for Dungeons & Dragons 3rd edition, d20 Modern and other d20 System games.

=== Licensed products ===
Guardians of Order licensed the rights to a variety of titles to convert them into role-playing games. The majority were based on Big Eyes, Small Mouth and licensed from anime series. The books also served as resource guides, summarizing the episodes in the series and the characters.

==== Standalone RPGs ====
- The Sailor Moon Role-Playing Game and Resource Book (1998)
- Dominion Tank Police RPG And Resource Book (1999)
- Demon City Shinjuku RPG And Resource Book (2000)
- Tenchi Muyo RPG And Resource Book (2000)
- El-Hazard RPG And Resource Book (2001)
- Ghost Dog: The Way of the Samurai RPG and Resource Book (2001) - Based on a live-action movie
- Nobilis (2002) - Original role-playing game in which players portray abstract concepts or classes of things like "time". Originally published by Pharos Press, then Hogshead Press.
- The Authority RPG And Resource Book (2004) - Based on the Wildstorm (later DC Comics) comic book of the same name. Uses Silver Age Sentinels as a base.
- Tékumel: Empire of the Petal Throne (2005) - Fantasy role-playing based on the novels of M. A. R. Barker. The fourth published RPG based on Tékumel
- A Game of Thrones (2005) - Uses the d20 System and based on the A Song of Ice and Fire novels. Published in conjunction with Sword and Sorcery Studios.
- Amber Diceless Roleplaying Game - This would have been the second published RPG based on The Chronicles of Amber novels. However, while the rights were acquired in 2004, a new version was never published.

==== Resource books ====
These books were not standalone and required a copy of either the BESM or BESM d20 rules to play.

- BESM Hellsing Ultimate Fan Guides: #1 (2002), #2 (2003). Not a self-contained RPG, relied on BESM. #1 covered episodes 1-6, while #2 covered 7-13.
- BESM Hellsing d20 (2003): Reprinted fan guides as a single hardbound book.
- BESM Trigun d20 (2004): Hardbound book covered all 26 episodes of the TV series.
- The Slayers d20 Role-Playing Game (2004) - Based on the BESM d20 rules instead of the original BESM Tri-Stat rules. Only covered the first 26 episodes. The remaining episodes were covered in later resource books: BESM: The Slayers: Next (2004, Episodes 27-52), BESM: The Slayers: Try (2004, Episodes 53-78)
- BESM: Revolutionary Girl Utena: The Rose Collection (2004) - Covers episodes 1 through 13.
- BESM: Revolutionary Girl Utena: The Black Rose Saga (2005) - Covers episodes 14 through 26.
