= GURPS Vehicles =

Role-playing games supplement

- First edition cover
- Designers: David Pulver
- Publishers: Steve Jackson Games
- Publication: 1993; 33 years ago
- Genres: Science fiction
- Systems: GURPS

GURPS Vehicles is a sourcebook for GURPS by David Pulver. The first edition was published in 1993.

== Contents ==
GURPS Vehicles explains how to build and operate an array of conveyances, from sailboats to starships to witches' brooms. Step-by-step instructions show how to select the structural frame, propulsion system, and thrust factor for vehicles such as a nuclear-powered tilt-rotor mini-copter. The book includes a heavily mathematical system for vehicle construction as part of its complex and intricate set of game mechanics.

The second edition of GURPS Vehicles presents a full system for vehicle design, its content completely re-written, revised and updated from the original edition, with new options and accessories, rules for spacecraft and locomotives, and a complete design system for weapons.

== Publication history ==
GURPS Vehicles was written by David Pulver and published by Steve Jackson Games. After the Secret Service raid on SJG, the company stopped publishing adventures for financial reasons, and instead released more standalone GURPS books; this included universal books such as GURPS Vehicles.

== Reception ==
Rick Swan reviewed GURPS Vehicles for Dragon magazine #205 (May 1994). He comments that the book has "some of the year's most literate writing and meticulous research, courtesy of ace designer David Pulver". Swan concludes that although the material is "presented in GURPS-speak, a referee with a calculator should be able to reconfigure the statistics for other games".

Andy Butcher reviewed GURPS Vehicles 2nd Edition for Arcane magazine, rating it a 7 out of 10 overall. He comments that "the actual design process has been simplified, making it easier to use without sacrificing detail, and the designs are fully compatible with GURPS Robots. This last point is not particularly surprising, considering that this book has been written by the same author, David L. Pulver." Butcher commented that the design process is "pleasantly logical" and added that "GURPS Vehicles is admirably flexible and enables you to design pretty much anything you like" however he concluded: "you can't help but wonder just how this book's going to be useful. Certainly, if you're running a vehicle-heavy campaign, and want some degree of consistency in the designs, or intend to allow your players to build custom vehicles, then GURPS Vehicles 2nd Edition will be very handy indeed. For most campaigns, though, I can't imagine it's going to be required reading. Still, it certainly achieves what it sets out to do well."

Rick Swan reviewed GURPS Vehicles, Second Edition for Dragon magazine #240 (October 1997). Swan comments: "if you can drive it, fly it, or hitch it to a donkey, you'll find it in GURPS Vehicles, a staggeringly complete collection of conveyances for the GURPS game (but adaptable to other game systems with a little effort). New to this edition are the plethora of starships, a slew of new accessories, and all the nips and tucks necessary to ensure compatibility with GURPS Robots (also by Pulver). But the main attraction remains the same: easy-to-follow guidelines for building game-ready versions of everything from skateboards to time machines."
