= Chris Pramas =

American game designer

- Chris Pramas August 29, 2026
- Born: Chris Pramas
- Occupation: Game designer
- Writing career
- Genre: Role-playing games
- Website: www.chrispramas.com

Chris Pramas is an American game designer and writer, as well as a founder of Green Ronin Publishing. He is best known as the designer of the Dragon Age RPG, Warhammer Fantasy Roleplay (second edition), and Freeport: The City of Adventure.

== Career ==
=== Early career ===
Pramas began his career in the game industry as a freelancer in 1993, contributing to games such as Underground from Mayfair Games, the supplement Dangerous Prey (1995) from Pariah Press for The Whispering Vault, and The Dying of the Light (1995) Warhammer Fantasy Roleplay campaign from Hogshead Publishing. He also contributed to the game Over the Edge. Pramas acquired the rights to The Whispering Vault from Mike Nystul in early 1996 and with his brother Jason Pramas and their friend Neal Darcy, they founded the company Ronin Publishing; Jason Pramas left before long, and Ronin Publishing only successfully published The Book of Hunts (1997) before the rights to The Whispering Vault were transferred to another company. Pramas moved to Seattle, Washington in August 1997, and made freelancing his full-time occupation. Pramas worked on the sourcebook Blood of the Valiant (1998) for Feng Shui to be published by Daedalus Games; when that company instead went out of business, Pramas acquired a license to publish his adventure, which became the second and final book published by Ronin Publishing.

=== Wizards of the Coast ===
Pramas accepted an offer of employment from Wizards of the Coast as an RPG designer in March 1998. Pramas designed the wuxia-inspired Dragon Fist, a variation of Advanced Dungeons & Dragons that was released in 1999 as one of the first PDF releases from the company. Pramas made contributions on several products for AD&D and co-wrote the PDF-only Dark•Matter adventure The Final Church (2000). Wizards created a miniatures division and made Pramas the creative designer on the Chainmail Miniatures Game (2001). Pramas created the "Sundered Empire" setting for Chainmail, which he intended to be a standalone setting but Wizards management wanted him to place the Sundered Empire in Greyhawk, so he made it into the subcontinent Western Oerik.

Pramas' work for Dungeons & Dragons includes: Slavers (2000, with Sean K. Reynolds), Guide to Hell (1999), Apocalypse Stone (2000, with Jason Carl), Vortex of Madness (2000), as well as some work on the third edition Player's Handbook (2000) and Dungeon Master's Guide (2000).

=== Green Ronin ===
Pramas founded Green Ronin Publishing in 2000 with his wife Nicole Lindroos, and by 2001 they had brought Hal Mangold on as a third member of the team to do freelance graphic layout for Green Ronin. Wizards of the Coast laid off Pramas in March 2002. Toren Atkinson of the band The Darkest of the Hillside Thickets arranged with Pramas to have Green Ronin publish his RPG Spaceship Zero (2002) based on one the albums by the band. Pramas asked Steve Kenson to design a new d20-based superhero role-playing game for Green Ronin, which resulted in Mutants & Masterminds (2002). Green Ronin was incorporated as an LLC in 2004, with Pramas, Lindroos, and Mangold as the three partners. Pramas designed the second edition of Warhammer Fantasy Roleplay (2005) for Games Workshop. Pramas wrote the sourcebook The Pirate's Guide to Freeport (2007) for Green Ronin, with Patrick O'Duffy and Robert J. Schwalb. While continuing to lead Green Ronin Publishing, Pramas is a content designer for the Pirates of the Burning Sea massively multi-player online game at Flying Lab Software. Pramas designed the simplified class-and-level system for the role-playing game Dragon Age: Set I (2009).

Pramas also worked as the lead writer for Warhammer 40,000: Dark Millennium Online at Vigil Games.

Pramas was a notable guest at Trinoc*coN in 2005, and a guest of honour at Ropecon 2008 in Dipoli, Espoo, Finland. He has also been a guest of Pacificon in 2015, and OrcaCon in 2016.

In 2012, he appeared on two episodes of the web series TableTop running his Dragon Age roleplaying game for host Wil Wheaton and the show's guests. Since 2012 he has also been one of the curators of an annual "Art of RPGs" art show featuring the work of artists whose work have appeared in role-playing games.

== Bibliography ==
Books and games Pramas has written or contributed to include the following:

=== Books ===
- Dwarf Warfare (Osprey Publishing)
- Orc Warfare (Osprey Publishing)
- Elf Warfare (Osprey Publishing)
- The Kobold Guide to Combat (Kobold Press)
- The Kobold Guide to Worldbuilding (Kobold Press)
- Family Games: The 100 Best (Green Ronin)
- Hobby Games: The 100 Best (Green Ronin)

=== Games ===
- Torches & Pitchforks: The Card Game of Monster Movie Mayhem (Green Ronin)
- Magic the Gathering: Urza's Legacy (Wizards of the Coast)

=== Role Playing Games ===
- Dragon Age (Green Ronin)
  - Dragon Age Set 1
  - Dragon Age Set 2
  - Dragon Age Set 3
  - Dragon Age Core Rulebook
- Freeport (Green Ronin)
  - Freeport: The City of Adventure
  - The Pirates Guide to Freeport
  - Crisis in Freeport
  - Madness in Freeport
  - Terror in Freeport
  - Death in Freeport
  - The Freeport Trilogy
  - Creatures of Freeport
  - Black Sails Over Freeport
- Warhammer
  - Warhammer 40,000: Dark Heresy (Games Workshop / Black Industries, Fantasy Flight Games)
  - Warhammer Fantasy Roleplay, 2nd Edition
  - Warhammer Fantasy Roleplay: Children of the Horned Rat (Games Workshop / Black Industries, Green Ronin)
  - Warhammer Fantasy Roleplay: Spires of Altdorf (Games Workshop / Black Industries, Green Ronin)
  - Warhammer Fantasy Roleplay: Shades of Empire (Games Workshop / Black Industries, Green Ronin)
  - Warhammer Fantasy Roleplay: Sigmar's Heirs: A Guide to the Empire (Games Workshop / Black Industries, Green Ronin)
  - Warhammer Fantasy Roleplay: Old World Armoury (Games Workshop / Black Industries, Green Ronin)
  - Warhammer Fantasy Roleplay: Ashes of Middenheim (Games Workshop / Black Industries, Green Ronin)
  - Warhammer Fantasy Roleplay: Old World Bestiary (Games Workshop / Black Industries, Green Ronin)
  - Warhammer Fantasy Roleplay: Plundered Vaults (Games Workshop / Black Industries, Green Ronin)
- Dungeons & Dragons (Wizards of the Coast)
  - Dungeons & Dragons: Chainmail
  - Shadow of the Drow
  - The Ghostwind Campaign
  - Fire and Ice
  - Blood and Darkness
  - Secrets of Magic, "Burning Vengeance"
  - The Final Church
  - Slavers
  - The Apocalypse Stone
  - The Vortex of Madness
  - Dragon Fist
  - Guide to Hell
- Fantasy AGE (Green Ronin)
- Titansgrave: The Ashes of Valkana (Green Ronin)
- A Song of Ice and Fire Roleplaying (Green Ronin)
- Mutants and Masterminds (Green Ronin)
- Hong Kong Action Theatre!, 2nd Edition (Guardians of Order)
- True20 (Green Ronin)
- The Emerald Spire Superdungeon (Paizo Publishing)
- Hillfolk RPG: "Brigade" (Pelgrane Press)
- Nocturnals: A Midnight Companion (Green Ronin)
- Pathfinder Chronicles: Guide to the River Kingdoms (Paizo Publishing)
- Medieval Player's Manual (Green Ronin)
- The Psychic's Handbook (Green Ronin)
- Testament: Roleplaying in the Biblical Era (Green Ronin)
- Star Trek: The Next Generation RPG (Last Unicorn Games)
- Forgotten Lives (Atlas Games)
- Heaven and Hell (Steve Jackson Games)
- The Book of Hunts (Ronin Publishing)
- Marked for Death (Daedalus Entertainment)
- Dying of the Light (Hogshead Publishing)
- Underground Companion (Mayfair Games)
- Underground Player's Handbook (Mayfair Games)

=== Dragon magazine articles ===
- Pramas, Chris. "Ahmut's Legion." Dragon #286. Renton, WA: Wizards of the Coast, 2001.
- -----. "The Armies of Thalos." Dragon #287. Renton, WA: Wizards of the Coast, 2001.
- -----. "The Children of Nassica." Dragon #295. Renton, WA: Wizards of the Coast, 2002.
- -----. "Drazen's Horde." Dragon #292. Renton, WA: Wizards of the Coast, 2002.
- -----. "The Ebon Glaive." Dragon #296. Renton, WA: Wizards of the Coast, 2002.
- -----. "The Empire of Ravilla." Dragon #285. Renton, WA: Wizards of the Coast, 2001.
- -----. "Exiles from the Vault." Dragon #298. Renton, WA: Wizards of the Coast, 2002.
- -----. "The Free States." Dragon #293. Renton, WA: Wizards of the Coast, 2002.
- -----. "The Gnolls of Naresh." Dragon #289. Renton, WA: Wizards of the Coast, 2001.
- -----. "People's State of Mordengard." Dragon #291. Renton, WA: Wizards of the Coast, 2002.
- -----. "The Sundered Empire: Soldiers of the Last Order." Dragon #315. Bellevue, WA: Paizo Publishing, January 2004.
- -----. "Underground Scenarios." Dragon #294. Renton, WA: Wizards of the Coast, 2002.

== Media mentions ==
Chris Pramas has appeared in the following newspaper and magazine articles, websites and podcasts.

=== Podcasts ===
- Caustic Soda: Episodes "Hitler" (2011), and "Regicide, Part 2" (2013)
- RPG Countdown: Chris appeared on these episodes: 22 April 2009 (Warriors & Warlocks), 1 July 2009 (Sigmar’s Heirs), 15 July 2009 (GM Pack and Toolkit).
- TableTop: "Dragon Age", Parts 1 & 2 (Season 1, Episodes 19 & 20 (2013)
- Titansgrave
- Vigilance Press Podcast
