= Freedom City =

Role-playing game setting

- 2nd edition cover
- Designers: Stephen Kenson
- Publishers: Green Ronin Publishing
- Publication: 2005
- Genres: Superhero fiction
- Systems: d20 System

Freedom City is a fictional, city-based campaign setting for the roleplaying game Mutants & Masterminds. It was designed by Steve Kenson.

== Publication history ==
Steve Kenson was working on Silver Age Sentinels and pitched Freedom City as a setting for the game, but the game's publishers, Guardians of Order, turned it down. Chris Pramas of Green Ronin Publishing asked Kenson to design a superhero role-playing game using the d20 System, so Kenson developed Mutants & Masterminds in 2002 in part to get his Freedom City setting published, which ultimately happened in 2003. Green Ronin published a trio of books to develop Freedom City through three different eras of comic books: Golden Age (2006), Iron Age (2007) and Silver Age (2010). Starting in 2008, a series of Freedom City Atlases made an expansion to the Freedom City setting. A new third edition of Mutants & Masterminds Hero's Handbook (2011) established a new setting in the game universe, Emerald City, which debuted in a series of PDF Threat Reports (2011), while a full setting book was planned for release at GenCon 44. Lastly, a third edition Freedom City book was published in October 2017, which advances the timeline and introduces new characters while retiring others.

== Reception ==
Freedom City won the 2003 Silver Ennie Award for "Best Art, Interior", "Best Graphic Design and Layout", and "Best Campaign Setting".

Freedom City won the 2006 Gold Ennie Award for "Best Campaign Setting/Setting Supplement".

== Reviews ==
- Fictional Reality #12
- Backstab #47
