= Devil (Dungeons & Dragons) =

Fictional monster from Dungeons & Dragons

- First appearance: First-edition Advanced Dungeons & Dragons Monster Manual
- Based on: Devil

In-universe information
- Type: Outsider
- Alignment: Lawful Evil

A devil, also referred to as a baatezu, is a member of a group of fictional creatures in the Dungeons & Dragons (D&D) roleplaying game typically presented as formidable opponents for advanced players. Devils are characterized by their Lawful Evil alignment and are depicted as originating from the Nine Hells of Baator. They follow a strict and hierarchical structure, progressing through various forms as they rise in rank. At the top of this hierarchy are the Archdevils, also known as the Lords of the Nine, who govern different regions within Baator. Devils are often portrayed as seeing the various worlds in the D&D universe as tools to be exploited for their objectives, such as participating in the Blood War—a centuries-long conflict against demons.

== Publication history ==
Devils first appeared in the original first-edition Advanced Dungeons & Dragons Monster Manual.

The release of the 2nd Edition Advanced Dungeons & Dragons brought a name change for the devils and their counterparts, demons. The 1st Edition's Deities and Demigods sourcebook was described as "exactly like witchcraft" by a televangelist. Concerned about protests from religious groups and others who viewed the game as an entryway into Satanic worship, TSR dropped the words "devil" and "demon" from all descriptors of the monsters, substituting instead, baatezu /beɪˈɑːtɛzuː/ and tanar'ri . This persisted until the rollout of the 3rd Edition when the original terms were reinstated. Since the change, the term "baatezu" has been retained as a specific subset of powerful devils.

=== Advanced Dungeons & Dragons 1st edition (1977–1988) ===
Devils first appeared in the first edition Monster Manual (1977), which included the barbed devil (lesser devil), the bone devil (lesser devil), the erinyes (lesser devil), the horned devil (malebranche) (greater devil), the ice devil (greater devil), the lemure, the pit fiend (greater devil), and the arch-devils Asmodeus, Baalzebul, Dispater, and Geryon, inspired by the figures from Hebrew and Christian mythology and their literary counterparts. The imp, a frequent servant of devils, also first appeared in the original Monster Manual. The Monster Manual was reviewed by Don Turnbull in the British magazine White Dwarf #8 (August/September 1978). As part of his review, Turnbull comments on several new monsters introduced in the book and considered devils the most prominent among them. Turnbull notes that "they are all pretty strong and compare not unfavourably in this respect with the Demons we already know".

Astaroth, Belial, and Satan appeared in the article "The Politics of Hell," in Dragon # 28 (August 1979); note that this article does not appear to be connected to the established canon of the Nine Hells. Selm, Prince of the Possessors, and the Asperim appeared in Dragon #42 (October 1980).

The Styx devil (greater devil) first appears in the Fiend Folio (1981).

A series of articles appearing in Dragon in 1983 greatly expanded upon the devils and their home, the Nine Hells, and introduced numerous new devils and arch-devils. The article "From the Sorcerer's Scroll: New Denizens of Devildom" by Gary Gygax in Dragon #75 (July 1983) introduced the black abishai, blue abishai, green abishai, red abishai, and white abishai (lesser devils), the bearded devil (lesser devil), the spined devil (least devil), the princess of Hell Glasya, the dukes of Hell Amon, Bael, Bitru, Hutijin, and Titivilus, and the arch devils Belial, Mammon – named after the figure appearing "in the Bible, as well as in [...] Edmund Spenser's The Faerie Queene – Mephistopheles, and Moloch. Dozens of unique devils appeared in a two-part article by Ed Greenwood, including the greater devils Bist, Caim, and Nergal, the dukes of Hell Agares, Alocer, Amduscias, Arioch, Balan, Bathym, Biffant, Caarcrinolaas, Chamo, Focalor, Gaziel, Gorson, Herodias, Machalas, Malphas, Melchon, and Merodach, and the princesses of Hell Cozbi, Lilis, and Naome in "The Nine Hells Part I" in Dragon #75, and the dukes of Hell Abigor, Adonides, Barbas, Barbatos, Bele, Bifrons, Bileth, Buer, Bune, Morax, Neabaz, Rimmon, Tartach, Zagum, and Zepar, the princesses of Hell Baalphegor, Baftis, and Lilith, the chancellor of Hell Adramalech, the queen of Hell Bensozia, and the inquisitor of Hell Phongor in "The Nine Hells Part II" in Dragon #76 (August 1983).

The black abishai, blue abishai, green abishai, red abishai, and white abishai (lesser devils), the bearded devil (lesser devil), the nupperibo (least devil), and the spined devil (least devil), appeared in the first edition Monster Manual II (1983), along with the princess of Hell Glasya, the dukes of Hell Amon, Bael, Hutijin, and Titivilus, and the arch devils Belial, Mammon, Mephistopheles, and Moloch. Ed Greenwood's follow-up article, "The Nine Hells Revisited" in Dragon #91 (November 1984), introduced the greater devils Armaros, Azazel, Cahor, Dagon, Duskur, Kochbiel, Malarea, Nisroch, Rumjal, and the arch-devil Gargoth.

Baalphegor appeared as the ultimate villain of "Caermor" in Dungeon #2 (November 1986) (which was later reprinted in the Dungeons of Despair anthology (1999).).

=== Advanced Dungeons & Dragons 2nd edition (1989–1999) ===
The black abishai, green abishai, red abishai lesser baatezu, the amnizu greater baatezu, the barbazu lesser baatezu, the cornugon greater baatezu, the erinyes lesser baatezu, the gelugon greater baatezu, the hamatula lesser baatezu, the lemure, the nupperibo least baatezu, the osyluth lesser baatezu, the pit fiend greater baatezu, and the spinagon least baatezu appear in the Monstrous Compendium Volume Outer Planes Appendix (1991). The black abishai, green abishai, and red abishai, lesser baatezu, and the pit fiend greater baatezu next appear in the Monstrous Manual (1993).

The Planescape campaign setting utilized devils, known exclusively as baatezu under 2nd edition rules, extensively. The black abishai, green abishai, and red abishai lesser baatezu, the amnizu greater baatezu, the barbazu lesser baatezu, the cornugon greater baatezu, the erinyes lesser baatezu, the gelugon greater baatezu, the hamatula lesser baatezu, the lemure, the nupperibo least baatezu, the osyluth lesser baatezu, the pit fiend greater baatezu, and the spinagon least baatezu are detailed in the first Planescape Monstrous Compendium Appendix (1994). The kocrachon lesser baatezu and the kyton appear in the Planes of Law boxed set (1995). Monstrous Compendium Annual Three (1996) featured the kyton again.

Guide to Hell (1999) described the transition of the devils and archdevils throughout the millennia, and reconciled the differences between the first edition and second edition archdevils by explaining the Reckoning of Hell. The book also describes the mezzikim. Moloch appeared in and played a key role in the adventure The Apocalypse Stone (2000).

=== Dungeons & Dragons 3.0 edition (2000–2002) ===
Devils appear in the Monster Manual for this edition (2000), including the barbazu (baatezu), the cornugon (baatezu), the erinyes (baatezu), the gelugon (baatezu), the hamatula (baatezu), the hellcat, the imp, the kyton, the lemure (baatezu), the osyluth (baatezu), and the pit fiend (baatezu).

The black abishai, blue abishai, green abishai, red abishai, and white abishai for the Forgotten Realms setting appear in Monsters of Faerûn (2000).

The spinagon (baatezu) and the narzugon (baatezu) appear in this edition's Manual of the Planes (2001). The kocrachon (baatezu) and the ghargatula (baatezu), as well as the archdevils Bel, Lord of the First; Dispater, Lord of the Second; Mammon, Lord of the Third; Belial/Fierna, Lord of the Fourth; Levistus, Lord of the Fifth; The Hag Countess, Lord of the Sixth (not technically a devil, but a powerful night hag); Baalzebul, Lord of the Seventh; Mephistopheles, Lord of the Eighth; and Asmodeus, Lord of the Ninth, appear in the Book of Vile Darkness (2002). The advespa (baatezu), the amnizu (baatezu), and the malebranche (baatezu) appear in this edition's Monster Manual II (2002). The paeliryon (baatezu) and xerfilstyx (baatezu), as well as the bloodbag imp, the euphoric imp, and the filth imp, appear in this edition's Fiend Folio (2003).

Savage Species (2003) presented the hamatula (devil), the imp (devil), and the kyton (devil) both as races and as playable classes.

The hellforged devils, including the coal devil, the glass devil, the lead devil, the obsidian devil, the sand devil, and the spiked devil, appear in Dragon #306 (April 2003).

The stony devil appears in Underdark (2003).

=== Dungeons & Dragons 3.5 edition (2003–2007) ===
Devils appear in the revised Monster Manual for this edition (2003), including the barbed devil (hamatula), the bearded devil (barbazu), the bone devil (osyluth), the chain devil (kyton), the erinyes, the hellcat (bezekira), the horned devil (cornugon), the ice devil (gelugon), the imp, the lemure, and the pit fiend.

The chain devil is presented as a player character race in the Planar Handbook (2004).

The desert devil (araton) appears in Sandstorm: Mastering the Perils of Fire and Sand (2005).

The unique devil Malkizid, the Branded King, appears in Champions of Ruin (2005) for the Forgotten Realms setting.

The logokron devil appeared in the Tome of Magic: Pact, Shadow, and Truename Magic (2006).

Fiendish Codex II: Tyrants of the Nine Hells (2006) includes new content for devils and inhabitants of Baator, including the black abishai, blue abishai, green abishai, red abishai, and white abishai, the amnizu, the assassin devil (dogai), the ayperobos swarm, the harvester devil (falxugon), the hellfire engine, the kalabon, the legion devil (merregon), the malebranche, the narzugon, the nupperibo, the orthon, the paeliryon, the pain devil (excruciarch), the pleasure devil (brachina), the spined devil (spinagon), the steel devil (bueroza), and the xerfilstyx. The book also contains statistics on the aspects of the Lords of the Nine, including Bel, Lord of the First; Dispater, Lord of the Second; Mammon, Lord of the Third; Belial and Fierna, Lords of the Fourth; Levistus, Lord of the Fifth; Glasya, Lord of the Sixth; Baalzebul, Lord of the Seventh; Mephistopheles, Lord of the Eighth; and Asmodeus, Lord of the Ninth .

The death devil (jerul) appears in Dragon #353 (March 2007). The gulthir devil, the remmanon devil, and the stitched devil appeared in Monster Manual V (2007).

The unique devils Moloch the Outcast, Titivilus, Bael, Balan, and Bathym all reappeared in the online version of Dragon, in issue #360 (October 2007) in the "Infernal Aristocracy" feature. The unique devils Agares, Tartach, Lilith, Hutijin, and Adramalech reappeared in Dragon #361 (December 2007) in the second part of the "Infernal Aristocracy" feature.

=== Dungeons & Dragons 4th edition (2008–2014) ===
Devils appear in the Monster Manual for this edition (2008), including the bearded devil (barbazu), the bone devil (osyluth), the chain devil (kyton), the ice devil (gelugon), the imp, legion devils (legion devil grunt, legion devil hellguard, legion devil veteran, and legion devil legionnaire), the pit fiend, the spined devil (spinagon), the succubus, and the war devil (malebranche). All devils now have the "Evil" alignment and speak Supernal. There were no changes to the line-up of the Lords of the Nine from Fiendish Codex II: Tyrants of the Nine Hells.

Asmodeus appears as one of the gods of evil in the 4th edition Dungeon Masters Guide (2008).

The assassin devil (dogai), erinyes, gorechain devil, infernal armor animus, misfortune devil, shocktroop devil, and withering devil appeared in the fourth edition Monster Manual 2 (2009). More devils are detailed in the Manual of the Planes (2008): barbed devil (hamatula), brazen devil, pain devil (excruciarch), storm devil and Dispater, the Lord of Dis; The Plane Above: Secrets of the Astral Sea (2010): burning devil, indwelling devil, pillager devil, and warder devil; and Monster Manual 3 (2010): corruption devil (paeliryon), hell knight (narzugon), hellwasp, passion devil, rage devil, slime devil, swarm devil and vizier devil; while Monster Vault (2010) revisited several devils originally printed in the Monster Manual – all of them except for the bearded devil, spined devil, and war devil – and Monster Vault: Threats to the Nentir Vale (2011) only contained the tar devil. Various high-ranking devils, including Alloces and Geryon, have had published statistics in the Codex of Betrayal feature in Dungeon magazine; the only Lords of the Nine with published statistics as of July 2012 are Dispater and Glasya.

== History ==
The Reckoning of Hell (often referred to as the Reckoning) was a civil war that shaped the political landscape of the Nine Hells into its current form. The Reckoning received its fullest treatment in the D&D sourcebook, A Guide to Hell.

== Types ==
=== Archdevils ===
Zariel is the current ruler of Avernus, the first layer of the Nine Hells of Baator. She was previously deposed by her chief warlord, a pit fiend called Bel, thousands of years in the past. However, she reclaimed her position after Bel proved inadequate in managing the Blood War.

My legions are the only thing standing between your precious Seven Heavens and the bottomless hunger of the Abyss. I did not fall into the clutches of evil. I rose to shoulder a cosmic burden.

— Zariel, Archduchess of Avernus, former angel of Celestia

Originally, she was an angel of Celestia who was charged with watching the Blood War. Instead of just observing, she marshaled forces and charged into Hell. Zariel succumbed to the corrupting nature of the plane and fell from grace. Asmodeus then put her in charge of Avernus. She was first mentioned in the second edition book Guide to Hell (1999). Zariel was also mentioned in third edition in the Manual of the Planes (2001), and Fiendish Codex II: Tyrants of the Nine Hells (2006). In 5th Edition, Zariel was given a stat block in Mordenkainen's Tome of Foes (2018). She is also featured heavily in the adventure module Baldur's Gate: Descent into Avernus (2019).

==== Asmodeus ====
Asmodeus
- Dungeons & Dragons character
- First appearance: Monster Manual (1977)
- Created by: Gary Gygax

In-universe information
- Alias: Lord of Nessus
- Race: Archdevil
- Gender: Male
- Title(s): King of Hell, Lord of the Ninth, Prince of Nessus
- Alignment: Lawful Evil
- Home: Baator, the Nine Hells
- Power level: Greater Deity
- Portfolio: Sin (all), Tyranny (4th edition)

Asmodeus (/æzmoʊˈdeɪəs/ az-mo-DAY-əs or /æzˈmoʊdiəs/ az-MOH-dee-əs) is a fictional character from the Dungeons & Dragons roleplaying game. His exact nature varies from publication to publication; he is variously presented as an evil god, a powerful devil, a devil who is as powerful as a god, or a god forced to assume the form of a devil. In all publication appearances, he is the King of the Nine Hells (Baator) and the Overlord of the lesser Dukes of Hell.

Asmodeus is named after Asmodeus, a Judeo-Christian demon of the same name, from the Book of Tobit, and for a fallen angel of the same name who appears in John Milton's "Paradise Lost."

His physical appearance is based on popular modern and medieval conceptions of Satan. Asmodeus first appears in the first edition Monster Manual (1977).

Baator and Asmodeus' place in it were further detailed in Ed Greenwood's "The Nine Hells Part II" in Dragon #76 (1983).

Owing to a moral panic regarding Dungeons & Dragons, Asmodeus did not initially appear in the 2nd edition.

In the Planescape line of game products, the lord of the lowest circle of hell was initially unnamed. Eventually, the Lord of the Ninth was revealed to be Asmodeus, in Guide to Hell (1999).

Asmodeus appeared along with the other lords of the Nine Hells in the Book of Vile Darkness (2002). He was further described in Fiendish Codex II: Tyrants of the Nine Hells (2006).

Conflicting stories of Asmodeus' power and origins are given throughout both books, ostensibly as an in-universe foil to those wishing to learn more about him.

Asmodeus appears as an evil god in the Dungeon Masters Guide (2008). His backstory for this edition is expanded in the supplements Manual of the Planes, The Plane Above: Secrets of the Astral Sea, and Demonomicon. His origins are explicitly defined as the leader of a rebellion against a forgotten god of good.

Setting-specific versions of Asmodeus are described in the Forgotten Realms Campaign Guide and the Eberron Campaign Guide. The Realms Asmodeus differs from the core character: he has only become a full god in the wake of the Spellplague, while the core version has been a god for millennia. Much of this information was presented as a retcon to justify changes from previous editions' settings.

It is unclear whether the Eberron Asmodeus is meant to be a literal god, since that setting's deities are much more aloof than those of other settings. His character is consistent with the generic presentation, however: he is the undisputed master of the Nine Hells.

In the Sword Coast Adventurer's Guide, the Realms Asmodeus retains the same recent history as the 4th edition version. He consumed the divine spark of Azuth, and through it achieved godhood during the Spellplague. This means that, while before the Spellplague he was Lord of the Nine Hells, and a powerful immortal being, he only became a god after the Spellplague.

Similar characters have appeared in products by publishers other than TSR or Wizards of the coast (copyright holders for Dungeons & Dragons material). The character is Wizards' intellectual property. However, because Asmodeus (the original mythical being) is in the public domain, the name and associated demonic characteristics may be used without infringing Wizards' copyright.

Asmodeus became an official part of the Judge's Guild City State of the Invincible Overlord setting with the publication of The Azurerain Pirates.

Green Ronin's The Book of Fiends series mentions Asmodeus. This series is published under the OGL.

Another OGL product was Asmodeus's Den of Deception, part of the Devilish Dens series.

Asmodeus features prominently in the Pathfinder Roleplaying Game setting.

His appearance in Dungeons & Dragons was cited as evidence for Satanism in the game by Pat Pulling and Kathy Cawthon in their 1989 book The Devil's Web.

The inclusion of Asmodeus and other Judeo-Christian devils in Dungeons & Dragons is discussed in Pegasus magazine as well.

Fabian Perlini-Pfister considered demons like Asmodeus among the "standard repertoire of "Monsters"" of the game.

Asmodeus is the most powerful of infernal beings. Like the other Archdevils, he is impervious to mundane attacks and requires powerful magics to slay. A powerful aura of submission surrounds him, making most who approach him slaves to his will.

As the master of Hell, he has complete power over lesser devils, including other lords of Baator. Several times he has permanently changed their physical forms at a whim. He transformed Mammon into a humanoid/serpent hybrid, and cursed Baalzebul with the form of a gigantic slug with tiny, useless arms.

Asmodeus carries a powerful unique artifact, the Ruby Rod, that allows him to use several powerful offensive and defensive spells. The Rod allows Asmodeus to attack with elemental forces, force his enemies to cower in fear, or cover himself with a field which heals and protects him. It is also a powerful melee weapon that can cause grievous wounds with the merest touch. In the default 4th edition setting, the Ruby Rod is a fragment of the shard of pure evil that created the Abyss, but this origin is not suggested in earlier editions. The 5th edition presents an account where the Ruby Rod is the physical incarnation of the devils’ ability to enter deals with mortals for their souls, and Asmodeus must carry it at all times as part of an agreement with the other powers of Law, to ensure that all devils abide by the contracts they enter into.

In addition to the Ruby Rod, Asmodeus possesses material wealth greater than entire mortal worlds. His clothing is so valuable that a single garment worn by Asmodeus is worth more than an average nation will spend on food in a year.

Finally, Asmodeus is an ancient schemer and manipulator, orchestrator of the most Machiavellian of schemes. He lays plans millennia in advance, patiently biding his time until his machinations come to fruition.

Through all five editions of Dungeons & Dragons, Asmodeus is depicted as the strongest, most cunning, and most handsome of all devils. He is typically described as appearing as a giant human, over 13 feet tall, with dark skin and hair, red eyes, handsome features, and small horns on his forehead. Beneath his clothing, Asmodeus' body is covered in bloody wounds which he sustained when he fell from the Upper Planes. His wounds ooze blood daily, and any drop of blood which touches the ground grows into a powerful devil.

He is described in the Book of Vile Darkness as a "calm, chillingly reasonable" being with a modest appearance that hides his true power.

In Dragon # 28, the article "The Politics of Hell" presents a different version of Asmodeus where he is the latest in a series of hellish rulers. Asmodeus overthrows Beelzebul, who in turn overthrew Satan. This early biography differs from later presentations.

In the Book of Vile Darkness, it is stated that while Asmodeus is the oldest devil in the Nine Hells, he may not be the original ruler.

Fiendish Codex II: Tyrants of the Nine Hells offers its own internally inconsistent accounts of Asmodeus' origins. It is suggested that, within the fictional settings of Dungeons & Dragons, these accounts may be differing interpretations of an underlying monomyth.

According to the Codex, Asmodeus began as a servant of the lawful gods. Asmodeus is described in some versions of the myth as an "angel" (though this is self-contradictory given the time period during which this would have occurred). He was "the bravest, toughest, fiercest and most beautiful of angels." He and the other angels were created to fight the demons of the Abyss, so that the gods could concern themselves with creating worlds and sentient beings.

After eons of fighting the creatures from the abyss, Asmodeus and some of his fellows began to change. They grew similar in appearance and methods to the demons which they fought. Afraid of his power and of the changes he had undergone, the gods put Asmodeus on trial and demanded that he be cast out of the Upper Planes. However, he argued effectively (and correctly) that he and his fellows had not violated the law. Asmodeus and his followers successfully sued for access to the Upper Planes and the honors to which they were entitled.

Once the gods created worlds and sentient beings, the demons attacked these, too. The gods created mountains, oceans, and wastelands to seal up the gates to the Abyss, but their creations defied their orders and explored their worlds, accidentally unsealing the gates. The gods could not understand why their creations did not follow their instructions, until Asmodeus explained to them that their system did not work because it relied solely upon voluntary compliance. Asmodeus explained that the only way to ensure obedience was to threaten mortals with a disincentive; hence, Asmodeus invented the concept of punishment.

Asmodeus convinced the gods to sign a contract called the Pact Primeval. This contract allowed Asmodeus and his fellow devils to take up residence in the abandoned realm of Baator, to punish the souls of wicked mortals, and to extract magical energy from the souls under their care in order to fuel their powers. Otherwise, Asmodeus reasoned, they would have to be granted the powers of godhood in order to do their job, which the current gods would surely find unacceptable.

In the myth that Asmodeus created Baator (from the Codex) it states that Asmodeus tortured souls in a far off section of the upper planes and that when their screams filled heaven the gods once again tried to remove Asmodeus from the upper planes, but by the Pact Primeval Asmodeus was allowed to torture the souls in heaven. Asmodeus offered the gods an alternative; give him the power to create his own plane of existence from which to torture the souls that broke heavenly law. The gods agreed and Asmodeus and his devils left and created the Nine Layers of Hell.

In both myths, the gods found the arrangement agreeable, at first. However, they eventually realized that fewer and fewer mortal souls were ascending to the Upper Planes, and Asmodeus was deliberately tempting mortals to damnation. When they arrived in Baator, the gods found that Asmodeus had turned it into a nightmarish world of endless suffering, filled with countless new devils. When called to account for his actions, Asmodeus uttered the famous words, "Read the fine print."

This story is presented as mythology, and the Codex itself admits that it does not tell the whole truth. For example, it is known that Asmodeus did not depart from the Upper Planes under amicable circumstances: He was cast out, and literally fell into the Lower Planes, sustaining serious wounds which have never healed. Part of Asmodeus' long-term plans includes using the magical energy harvested from souls in order to heal his wounds, and ultimately, the complete destruction of the Upper Planes, as well as to one day achieve godhood.

The names of the "gods" involved seem to change depending on what world and on which source the myth is told, and some aspects and versions of the origin myth contradict others. For example, the version told in the Fiendish Codex II states that St. Cuthbert became a distinct deity when he agreed with Asmodeus that "Retribution is the basis of all law," while the Deities & Demigods sourcebook states that he is a mortal who ascended to godhood.

The Manual of the Planes suggests a similar but different story. According to the section about the Nine Hells, Asmodeus' true form is that of a giant serpent. He was cast out of the Upper Planes before the creation of the current gods, and his fall created the 8th and 9th planes of Hell. He is currently still recovering from his wounds in the pits of the 9th level, and his devil form is just an avatar of the real Asmodeus. No one who tells the story of the true form of Asmodeus survives more than 24 hours after the telling. These stories are always connected with the name Ahriman of couatl history.

This story first appeared in the AD&D supplement Guide to Hell: Asmodeus is described as Ahriman, the twin brother of Jazirian the god of the couatls. In this story Jazirian and Ahriman were responsible for the establishment of the current arrangement of the planes but fought eventually because of their perspectives of the law (LG versus LE). Asmodeus is said to be a greater power without any need of worship in the guide. As the Forgotten Realms supplement Serpent Kingdoms, as well as the 2e supplement Monster Mythology, tells Jazirian is/was the lawful good aspect of the now-dead overpower the World Serpent, Asmodeus should be the lawful evil one. This interpretation puts Asmodeus as a more supreme evil than other equally official D&D canon, as he was in this material set up as the co-equal first cause of creation and the evil principle therein, rather than a reactionary segment and of evils potentially interpreted as lesser evil due to being meant to combat the demons of the abyss only having gone overboard, as in subsequent explanations of his origin.

In Fiendish Codex II: Tyrants of the Nine Hells, Asmodeus is described as one of the primal forces of evil in the D&D universe, and had a hand in creating Baator in order to punish sinners for their crimes. After being granted the power to do so, Asmodeus and his followers began consuming souls for power. Despite the horror of the good gods who'd established the Hells as a punishment, they didn't also expect its existence to help fuel evil in the world. As the devils consumed the essences of souls, they began to mutate into the devils that now populate the D&D universe.

Elder Evils names the original ruler of Hell as Zargon, a creature originally described in Dungeon Module B4: The Lost City, by Tom Moldvay.

The core setting of Dungeons & Dragons 4th Edition offers yet another origin for Asmodeus, identifying him as a former angel in service to a god only known as He Who Was. Asmodeus, as one of the greatest of the angels, was entrusted with leading angelic hosts in battle against the enemies of the gods. Though he served He Who Was loyally, Asmodeus believed that his deific master was far too forgiving and unwilling to use force. After the conflict, which came to be known as the Dawn War, Asmodeus was assigned to guard the entrance to the prison of the god Tharizdun which was located in the Abyss. The demon lord Pazuzu appeared to Asmodeus, as detailed in Demonomicon, and encouraged the angel to act on his thoughts of rebellion against He Who Was. When Asmodeus was ready to rise up, Pazuzu aided him in obtaining a small piece of the shard of evil at the heart of the Abyss, which Asmodeus used to create his infamous Ruby Rod. Asmodeus returned to Baathion, the realm of He Who Was, gathered those angels who would join his side, and instigated a rebellion that ended with his former master's death. With his last moments of life, He Who Was cursed Asmodeus and all the angels who had followed him. The angels were transformed into the first devils, and the beautiful astral dominion of Baathion was transformed into a prison realm known as the Nine Hells of Baator. Asmodeus assumed the divine might of the fallen deity and became a god himself, albeit one trapped inside his own dominion.

During the Dawn War he worked with Bane; although they hated each other personally they were disciplined enough to work well together. After the war, Bane anticipated the eventual angelic rebellion Asmodeus would launch, and alone of the Gods he was not surprised when it finally happened. Bane wanted to help, but both he and Asmodeus wanted to avoid bringing the other Gods into the fight, and feared that any open collaboration between the two of them would cause exactly that; to avoid notice, instead of soldiers Bane sent aid in the form of advisors and strategy experts. Whether or not this made any difference is unknown, but the devils will deal (slightly) more honestly with followers of Bane than worshippers of other Gods, and Bane's followers are more likely than others to summon and employ devils.

Asmodeus has few allies amongst the other Gods, and is on especially bad terms with Moradin and Avandra. He has a cordial relationship with Erathis, who regards tyranny as just another form that civilization can take. Asmodeus and Bane still maintain a facade of friendship, at least until one is powerful and confident enough to actually overthrow the other.

It is said that Asmodeus owes Pazuzu a favor for his help in the war, and has not yet repaid him.

Asmodeus is devoted to oppression and might through subversive action. He imposes strict rules and harsh punishments on his followers. The cult of Asmodeus urges its adherents to seek power over others, to repay evil with further evil (an eye for an eye), to exploit kindness for personal gain, and to show no compassion for the weak and downtrodden. All done in the most legal possible manner of course, and never overtly.

Typical rhetoric from worshippers of Asmodeus will discuss "promoting personal excellence and independence," "taking care of one's own affairs" and "ridding oneself of weakness". Sometimes one will hear of "ascending to godhood", or "no gods, no masters". When harming innocents, their actions are discussed as "providing motivation to succeed". Most often, ritual practices are deeply secretive and not publicly discussed. Most followers will not publicly admit their worship of Asmodeus, as that would compromise their potential bargaining position for greater power over non-followers.

Though Asmodeus's faith is by far the largest of the diabolic cults, few of Asmodeus' followers are known by name. A notable exception is Christophe Jean Markosian, "The Devil Behind Thrones," a hierarch of the Horned Society. Most of Asmodeus's worshippers are based in the towns and cities of humans and demihumans, though Asmodeus has some monstrous followers as well. His cultists use his faith as a stepping stone to wealth and power. They form secret alliances, using their wealth and connections to bring status and power to other members of the society.

According to the Guide to Hell, though he has worshipers and does on occasion grant them clerical powers, his true identity as Ahriman makes him loath to expand his cult. This is because his true motivation is to spread atheism through the multiverse and make all believe that "gods" are not divine at all, but beings who have achieved great power. In his plan, when belief fails, the outer planes will cease to exist. As Ahriman the evil lawmaker of the whole of the cosmos and unfettered by belief himself, he can then remold the multiverse perfectly according to his desires, and this time not having to share in its creation with Jazirian: the good creator of the multiverse's orderly structure. There will be no remnant of chaos as a result, or any missing rules in this future outer ring of planes, which will be the exclusive domain of Asmodeus.

In most lands, temples to Asmodeus are hidden subterranean complexes, though in places dominated by lawful evil, they may dominate the landscape. If a cult of Baalzebul overthrows the local government, cultists of Asmodeus typically assume control of their headquarters to bring the local diabolism into its "establishment phase."

Vassals

The following beings are among the most notable subjects of Asmodeus on Nessus. The forces at their disposal are listed, where appropriate:

- Adramalech – Chancellor of Hell, Keeper of Records (DR76).
- Alastor the Grim, pit fiend – Executioner.
- Baalberith (/ˈbeɪlbərɪθ/ BAYL-bər-ith), pit fiend – Major domo.
- Bensozia – Consort of Asmodeus, Queen of Hell (Deceased) (DR76).
- Buer – 15 companies of pit fiends (DR76).
- Bune – 30 companies of cornugons (DR76).
- Glasya – Daughter of Asmodeus and Bensozia, former Mistress of the Erinyes, now Lord of the Sixth (DR76).
- Martinet, pit fiend – Constable.
- Morax – 9 companies of pit fiends (DR76).
- Phongor – Inquisitor of Hell (DR76).
- Rimmon – 5 companies of gelugons (DR76).
- The Spark Hunters – Lord Asmodeus's personal guard of 13 hamatula rangers/mortal hunters who capture and/or slay mortals who draw their master's ire.
- Zagum – 30 companies of hamatula (DR76).

Enemies

Though he schemes against all the arch-devils, Asmodeus has a special hatred for Levistus.

As the Lord of Hell, Asmodeus oversees the Blood War against the chaotic demons and their demon prince leaders.

=== Baatezu ===
Baatezu (bay-AT-eh-zoo) are the ruling race of Baator's nine hells. They are lawful and evil.

Abishai
There are five kinds, easily distinguishable by color (black, blue, green, red, and white).
Advespa
Female, wasp-like devils that patrol infernal skies.
Amnizu
Short, stocky winged guardians of the gates of the Nine Hells.
Ayperobos
Small, hateful devils that work together as a swarm to bring down larger foes.
Barbazu ("Bearded Devil")
Ferocious warrior that frenzies with a saw-toothed glaive.
Barbazu, Half-Troll
Brachina ("Pleasure Devil")
Devilish counterpart of the demonic succubus, and an advanced Erinyes.
Bueroza ("Steel Devil")
Cornugon ("Horned Devil")
Gargoyle-like fiend armed with a spiked chain.
Dogai ("Assassin Devil")
Erinyes
A fallen angel that delivers death from her fiery bow. The devilish counterpart to the demonic succubus. Based on the Erinyes from Greek myth.
Excruciarch ("Pain Devil")
Falxugon ("Harvester Devil")
Gelugon ("Ice Devil")
Insectile horror promising a cold death.
Ghargatula
Dinosaurlike guardians with massive maw and a wicked stinger.
Hamatula ("Barbed Devil")
Elite infernal warrior with impaling spikes.
Kocrachon
Insectoid diabolical torturer.
Lemure
Mindless, tormented creature that attacks in mobs. Cannon fodder in Blood War.
Logokron
Delight in learning the personal truenames of their foes, then tormenting them or turning them into slaves.
Malebranche
Hulking, horned warriors, enforcers, punishers, and mounts.
Merregon ("Legion Devil")
Narzugon
Nightmare-riding elite cavalry.
Nupperibo
A grossly fat devil, one of the least powerful of its kind.
Orthon
Foot soldiers of Hell's armies specializing in killing demons.
Osyluth ("Bone Devil")
Osyluths serve as the informers and police of the Nine Hells.
Paeliryon
Disgusting spymasters with deforming fingernails. Slightly more powerful than Pit Fiends. Rarely encountered as they work behind the scenes where they manipulate others.
Pit Fiend
Lord of devils, with great strength and deadly power.
Spinagon ("Spined Devil")
Spike-covered eyes and ears of Baator.
Xerfilstyx
Memory-stealing guardians of the River Styx in Avernus.

=== Non-Baatezu ===
- Chain Devil (Kyton) – Murderous torturer with an infernal command of chains.
- Desert Devil (Araton) – Scimitar-wielding desert-dwelling devils.
- Hellcat (Bezekira) – Infernal, invisible catlike devil the size of a tiger.
- Hellfire Engine – Constructs of cold iron made to combat celestials and demons. Enhanced with hellfire.
- Imp – Clever devil that aids evil mortals with dark counsel and trickery.
- Imp, Filth – Foul-smelling imp with a talent for forgery and translation.
- Imp, Bloodbag – Imp that serves as infernal nurse corps.
- Imp, Euphoric – Imp that serves as dealer of hallucinogenic slime.
- Kalabon – Devils spawned from the rotting flesh of the Hag Countess's carcass that can combine their individual bodies into large amalgamations which fights as a single creature.

==== Hellforged devils ====
A subgroup of devils, known as hellforged devils, were constructs that over time were transformed by the Nine Hells of Baator into living beings. They rigidly follow and enforce the laws of the Hells.

- Coal Devil: Enforcers and shock troops.
- Glass Devil: Spies and watchers.
- Lead Devil: Dispatched to capture prisoners alive.
- Obsidian Devil: Police force of the Nine Hells.
- Sand Devil: Spies and informers.
- Spiked Devil: Covered with sharp iron spikes.
