= Credence =

Credence can refer to:

== In media ==
- "Credence", a song by Swedish progressive metal band Opeth from their album, My Arms, Your Hearse
- Credence (film), a 2015 British Sci-fi film written and directed by Mike Buonaiuto
- Credence (novel), a graphic novel written by Michael Easton
- Credence Barebone, a fictional character from the Fantastic Beasts film series

== Other uses ==
- Credence (statistics), a statistical term that expresses how much a person believes that a proposition is true
- Credence good, a good whose utility impact is difficult or impossible for the consumer to ascertain
- Credence Systems, a manufacturer of test equipment for the global semiconductor industry
- Credence table, a small side table in the sanctuary of a Christian church
- Letter of credence, a formal diplomatic letter that designates a diplomat as ambassador to another sovereign state

== See also ==
- Creedence Clearwater Revival, an American rock band formed in El Cerrito, California
- Creedence (footballer), Brazilian footballer, named for the band
