= Dangerous Prey =

Role-playing game supplement

Dangerous Prey is a supplement published by Pariah Press in 1995 for the horror role-playing game The Whispering Vault.

== Publication history ==
Dangerous Prey is a 110-page perfect-bound softcover book designed by Nigel Findley, William Spencer-Hale, Kevin Hassall, Aaron Loeb, Andrew Lucas, Geoff McMartin, Bryan Nystul, Mike Nystul, and Chris Pramas, with interior art by Pat Coleman, Earl Geier, Dave MacKay, Jeff Miracola, and Mike Naylor, and cover art by Larry MacDougall, and Jeff Miracola.

Dangerous Prey and a three-panel gamemaster's screen were the only two supplements for The Whispering Vault that Mike Nystul, the original designer, was able to publish through Pariah Press, before he moved on to a brief time working at TSR until 1996.

== Contents ==
Dangerous Prey contains more information on the Unbidden and their minions, the malign spirits that player characters hunt and imprison.

== Reception ==
In the May 1995 edition of Dragon (Issue #217), Lester W. Smith gave this book a thumbs up, calling it "an excellent addition to the game's mythos [...] The art and text carry on the tradition of the original game, resulting in another book that is refreshingly concise, and just as darkly horrific." Smith concluded by giving the book an above average rating of 5 out of 6, saying "While you certainly don’t need the Dangerous Prey book to play the Whispering Vault game, the material it provides will definitely enhance a campaign. I highly recommend it."

In the following edition of Dragon (Issue #218 – June 1994), Rick Swan also reviewed Dangerous Prey and liked what he saw, saying, "So vivid is the writing, the pages practically ooze slime."

== Reviews ==
- Casus Belli #88
- Australian Realms #23
