= Ronin Arts =

Game publisher

- Founded: 2003; 23 years ago
- Founders: Philip J. Reed; Christopher Shy

Ronin Arts is a role-playing game company founded as a joint venture by Philip J. Reed and Christopher Shy in 2003, to some degree a successor to Shy's Studio Ronin and Reed's selling of role playing games PDFs from his blog.

Ronin Arts publishes or published at some point, among other products The Whispering Vault, Star Ace, M&M Superlink support, and D20 Future support.

== History ==
Author Philip J. Reed and artist Christopher Shy formed the new company Ronin Arts in 2003 to showcase their talents. The first version of their website sold both the 101 series of books by Reed as well as illustrated art books such as the edition of Herbert West: Reanimator (2003) featuring artwork by Shy. Ronin Arts expanded that same year beyond their d20 collections by purchasing the rights to The Whispering Vault by Pariah Press and Star Ace by Pacesetter. Reed and Shy started producing new material for The Whispering Vault soon after, starting with Mortal Magic (2003) that was previously unpublished by Ronin Publishing, but after publishing several more PDFs in 2003, that line ceased. Reed wanted to convert Star Ace to d20 Modern but never finished work on that. Ronin Arts was so successful that Reed left Steve Jackson Games in 2004 to work full-time on the company. Around that, freelancers such as Bruce Baugh, Michael Hammes, James Maliszewski and Patrick Younts started to produce material for Ronin Arts.

Ronin Arts has produced material for other licensed systems, such as publishing the "Runic Fantasy" series for the Mongoose Publishing version of RuneQuest (2006-2007), the "First Edition Fantasy" series for retro-clone OSRIC (2006-2007), and supplements for Mutants & Masterminds (2003-2008). Hammes and Reed designed the 4C System (2007), a retro-clone of the Marvel Super Heroes role-playing system, which then received supplements from Hazard Studio, Highmoon Games, Seraphim Guard among other companies. Ronin Arts was also able to publish an early Freeport licensed supplement, Treasures of Freeport (2004) followed by some True20 supplements (2005-2006) and a long-running series of Mutants & Masterminds Archetype books (2006-2007) which Green Ronin sold directly. Reed was able to sell an extended PDF series in 2006 called ePublishing 101, which explained how to succeed at PDF production. The market for PDFs had slowed down greatly by 2007 so Reed went back to work for Steve Jackson Games, and in 2008 he became their Chief Operating Officer.

Ronin Arts began as an experiment, when Reed wrote the company's first PDF 101 Spellbooks. Surprised by how quickly the gaming community embraced the product, he quickly set out to produce more. The company soon made its products available at RPGNOW.com, one of the first sites to exclusively handle the sale and promotion of roleplaying games in electronic format. From 2003 to 2007 at least, Ronin Arts was considered one of the most successful publishers in the emerging PDF industry.

In February 2007, however, they ended their relationship with RPGNOW due to creative differences.

As of March 2015, Ronin Arts' website is no longer active, having apparently been let go as of late 2012 or early 2013. Many of its products are still available by way of Lulu, Warehouse 23 and Paizo Publishing.

Not to be confused with Green Ronin Publishing, another popular producer of RPG supplements.
