= Black Sails Over Freeport =

2003 role-playing game

Black Sails Over Freeport is a 2003 role-playing game adventure published by Green Ronin Publishing.

== Contents ==
Black Sails Over Freeport is a d20 System adventure that is set in the Freeport setting.

== Publication history ==
Shannon Appelcline states that "Though Green Ronin cut its teeth on adventures, they've never been more than a minor part of the company's production and for years all of their adventures focused on Freeport. This includes: the devilish crossover Hell in Freeport (2001); the mega-adventure Black Sails over Freeport (2003); the short adventures of Tales of Freeport (2005); and the metaplot-advancing Crisis in Freeport (2006). There were also a few Freeport sourcebooks: Freeport: The City of Adventure (2002), Denizens of Freeport (2002), and Creatures of Freeport (2004)."

== Reception ==
The reviewer from the online second volume of Pyramid stated that "Big adventures for d20 System are not all that unusual, but formatting them as anything other than trilogies definitely is. The latest exception is Black Sails Over Freeport, a mammoth campaign crowbarred into the confines of its 256-pages. This makes it by far the biggest release for Green Ronin's pirate-themed d20 System setting, Freeport: City of Adventure. Indeed, a prospective GM for this campaign will get the most out of it by having both the Freeport: City of Adventure sourcebook, and its supplement, Denizens of Freeport at hand."

Black Sails Over Freeport won the 2003 Origins Awards for "Best Role-Playing Game Adventure".

Black Sails Over Freeport won the 2004 Silver Ennie Award for "Best Adventure".

== Reviews ==
- Backstab #47

== See also ==
- Denizens of Freeport
- Tales of Freeport
