= Stephanie Pui-Mun Law =

American painter and illustrator (born 1976)

- Known for: Fantasy art

Stephanie Pui-Mun Law is an American painter and illustrator who works predominantly in watercolor and whose art is inspired by, and depicts scenes of fantasy, the Other World, and the surreal. She has also been influenced by the art of the Impressionists, Pre-Raphaelites, and Surrealists, as well as other contemporary popular fantasy artists.

She studied at University of California, Berkeley with a double BA degree in Fine Arts and Computer Science. She currently resides in Oakland, California.

== Career ==
Wizards of the Coast has used Law's work in products for their Forgotten Realms campaign setting, as well as their Magic: the Gathering collectible card game. Her work features prominently throughout the Blue Rose RPG product line by Green Ronin Publishing.

Her work has appeared in three books by David Riche (The Art of Faery, World of Faery and Watercolor Fairies) and she has done cover art for several books by Catherine Asaro, published by Luna Books (an imprint of Harlequin Enterprises). She did the cover art for Young Arcan and the Garden of Loc, by Matthew R. Milson. She is also the author of tutorial book "Dreamscapes: Creating Magical Angel, Faery & Mermaid Worlds In Watercolor" published by Impact Books.

Law's portfolio of published work and list of clients also includes White Wolf (Changeling: The Lost), Precedence Entertainment (Wheel of Time collectible card game, Rifts collectible card game), HarperCollins (covers for The Demon Child Trilogy by Jennifer Fallon), Realms of Fantasy magazine, Michael Swanwick's Field Guide to Mesozoic Megafauna by Michael Swanwick and published by Tachyon Publications, Carus Publishing Company (known for their magazines for elementary/junior high/high school readers such as "Cricket" and "Cicada"), Elemental Designer Games (ChessMage collectible card game), Skotos (Castle Marrach role-playing game), Alderac Entertainment Group (Warlord, Seventh Sea, and Legend of the Five Rings collectible card games), Talislanta, and Black Knight Games.

== Awards ==
In the 2002 ENnies she shared a nomination for 'Best Interior Art' for her work in Bastion Press's 'Spells & Magic' book. In the 2005 ENnies her cover art for the Blue Rose role-playing game won a Silver Award.
