= Dragon Age (disambiguation) =

Dragon Age is a fantasy media franchise primarily focused on a series of role-playing video games published by Electronic Arts

Dragon Age can also refer to:

- Dragon Age (role-playing game), the tabletop role playing game adaptation of the Electronic Arts franchise published by Green Ronin
- Monthly Dragon Age, a Japanese shōnen manga magazine published by Fujimi Shobo
- Dragon Age Pure, a Japanese shōnen manga magazine published by Fujimi Shobo
