= Credence (novel) =

Novel authored by Michael Easton

Cover Art by Steven Perkins

Credence is a graphic novel written by Michael Easton. It was published in 2013 by Blackwatch Comics. Illustrated by Steven Perkins, the story is presented with black-and-white art panels in a stark, film noir style and is visually different from Easton's previous works, Soul Stealer and The Green Woman. While the perspective of both these earlier stories reflected their morally conflicted protagonists, Credence is harsher, with a bleaker perspective on the surrounding world.

A sequel, Credence II: Lose This Skin, was released in 2020.

== Summary ==
Danny Credence is the most decorated cop in New York City, and is a self-destructive, angry, corrupt loner who prefers the company of his three-legged dog to human beings. He struggles to be a decent single father to his son, struggles with his ex-wife, and struggles with the constant pull between addiction and recovery.

Coming from a family of cops, his identity is wrapped up in and defined by the legacy of his badge – being one of ‘the good guys' in search of the bad ones, even while he's committing morally questionable acts. With his life in crisis and his career the only thing he has to cling to, Credence struggles to stop himself from sliding into a degeneracy that both repulses and pulls him. As he pursues a murderer whose crimes shock even him, he realizes he understands his quarry with an intimacy that could be the final push into the darkness.

"It's about a guy who's trying to hold together his family while he spirals deep into depravity — the catch being that he's also a cop," Easton observed to TV Guide. "He's also a guy who is having a lot of trouble relating to everyday life...He understands criminals better than he understands what's going on in society."

== Reviews ==
Keith Howell commended the story in Ain't It Cool News. "Easton excels at delivering the inner darkness of human depravity while finding subtle ways to pierce the shadow with the sharp light of beauty," he observed. "It's one more example of Easton pushing the boundaries of the box of public expectations. It delivers the goods like a solid police drama, but with a deeper spiritual resonance of how the bad choices we make drive the direction of our lives."

"Abel Ferrara's pull quote on the front of this comic isn't wrong, as Danny Credence really does give Harvey Keitel's character a run for his money," Greg Burges of Comic Book Review wrote. "Credence navigates the world with a cynic's eye, blasting humanity's obsession with reality television and selfies," adding, "It's nice to see Easton try something different with the hard-boiled cop trope…it's an unusual comic."

LA Weekly praised the novel, saying, "if Raymond Chandler was writing graphic novels today … it would read like Credence."
