= Blue Rose (role-playing game) =

Fantasy tabletop role-playing game

- Cover art by Stephanie Pui-Mun Law
- Designers: Jeremy Crawford, Dawn Elliot, Stephen Kenson, John Snead
- Publishers: Green Ronin Publishing
- Publication: 2005; 2017 (Second Edition)
- Genres: Romantic Fantasy
- Systems: True20; Adventure Game Engine (AGE) (Second Edition)

Blue Rose is a fantasy role-playing game created by Jeremy Crawford, Dawn Elliot, Steve Kenson, and John Snead and published by Green Ronin Publishing in 2005.

== Description ==
Blue Rose is game in the romantic fantasy genre, inspired by fantasy fiction such as that of Mercedes Lackey and Diane Duane as opposed to Conan the Barbarian–style swords and sorcery. It used a version of the D20 system called True20.

Blue Rose is a deliberate step away from the "combat-oriented adventures arranged around self-enrichment" as typified by Dungeons & Dragons. Instead, the emphasis is on social and emotional enrichment. As Rogers State University Library noted, "Connections to other characters matter as much as combat skills and magic in these stories of solving mysteries, righting wrongs, and daring heroics."

Blue Rose was the first role-playing game to explicitly set out acceptance of player characters of all genders and sexual orientations, as well as romantic relationships between adult characters that could include polyamory.

The book includes a short introductory scenario, "The Cures of Harmony" — the player characters investigate a curse in a small village that is being blamed on a gypsy caravan.

=== True20 system ===
Green Ronin developed a simplified "True20" system for this game. There are only three character classes; no ability scores, only ability modifiers; and instead of advancement through accumulation of experience points, all characters are automatically advanced every few sessions. Many characters have been born with magical or psychic talents rather than having to develop or learn them.

=== Setting ===
Blue Rose is set in a world called Aldea, and most campaigns center around the Kingdom of Aldis. Populations of sentient telepathic animals are prevalent in Aldis and are considered equal citizens on par with humans. Aldis endures tense relations with Jarzon, a neighboring realm of religious zealots. Both nations are threatened by Kern, an evil kingdom of necromancers, and have occasionally operated as uneasy allies against the common aggressor.

== Publication history ==
In the 1990s, Green Ronin was invested in the d20 System; with the demise of d20, Green Ronin attempted to introduce a new type of role-playing game, Blue Rose, using a simplified "True20" system. Blue Rose was created by Jeremy Crawford, Dawn Elliot, Steve Kenson, and John Snead. The product was released in 2005 as a 224-page softcover book with cover art by Stephanie Pui-Mun Law, and interior art by Eliane Bettocchi, Liz Danforth, Eliza Gauger, Jonathan Kirtz, Stephanie Pui-Mun Law, Leo Lingas, Jennifer Meyer, and Tula Lotay.

Two supplements were released, Blue Rose Companion and World of Aldea. But the game failed to find an audience and no further works were published for the game. Green Ronin subsequently released "True20" as a standalone genre-neutral system that could be adapted to any role-playing setting.

In 2017 Green Ronin used funds raised from Kickstarter to release a second edition of Blue Rose which made use of Green Ronin's own Adventure Game Engine (AGE) previously used in the Dragon Age tabletop RPG.

== Reception ==
The game news website ICv2 noted, "Blue Rose is an example of one of the trends evident in the 'Games' category in 2004 -- the attempt to broaden the audience for games to include more female participants."

In his 2023 book Monsters, Aliens, and Holes in the Ground, RPG historian Stu Horvath commented, "I find it slightly odd that the overall system, being derived from D&D, is so combat-focused; this seems like a missed opportunity to develop the sort of social mechanics that were emerging among indie RPGs." Horvath noted the essential good of the world of Aldea, saying, "There is a lich king and some forces of wickedness, and villains abound, but in focusing on the positives, Blue Rose actively resists many of the stereotypes and cliches on which fantasy RPGs reflexively fall back." Horvath concluded by noting the relative success of the second edition, saying, "this game that sought a once-elusive audience has finally found it."

== Awards ==
In 2005, Blue Rose won the Gen Con ENWorld Roleplaying Silver Medal for Best Cover Art, Best Rules, and Best d20 Game.

== Other recognition ==
A copy of Blue Rose is held in the Game Collection of Rogers State University Libraries.

== Other reviews ==
- Pyramid
