= Book of Fiends, Volume One: Legions of Hell =

Book of Fiends, Volume One: Legions of Hell is a 2001 supplement for d20 System role-playing games published by Green Ronin Publishing.

== Contents ==
Book of Fiends, Volume One: Legions of Hell is a supplement in which devils are detailed.

== Publication history ==
Shannon Appelcline noted that "In 2001 Green Ronin expanded beyond their early Freeport adventures and went into the business that the more successful d20 publishers were already in: publishing sourcebooks and other gaming material. This began with the well-received monster manual, Legions of Hell: Book of Fiends, Volume One (2001)."

== Reviews ==
- Pyramid
- Backstab
- Asgard #1 (July, 2001)
- Realms of Fantasy
