= Ork! The Roleplaying Game =

Tabletop role-playing game

Ork! The Roleplaying Game is a role-playing game published by Green Ronin Publishing in 2000.

== Description ==
In many role-playing games, the players take on the roles of heroes fighting monsters. In Ork! The Roleplaying Game, the tables are turned, as players become the monsters, taking on the role of orks.

== Gameplay ==
=== Character generation ===
After choosing a name for the ork character, the player then assigns values to the four abilities: Meat, Bones, Twitch, and Mojo. The player assigns any number of polyhedral dice to each value (4-, 6-, 8- 10- or 12-sided dice). The total of each ability can't be less than 4 (one 4-sided die) or greater than 12 (one 12-sided die); and the total of all four cannot exceed 32.

There are skills associated with each ability:

- Meat: Climb, Jump, Fight, Smash
- Bones: Drink, Run, Sawbones, Swim
- Twitch: Chuck, Grab, Eyeball, Ride, Sneak
- Mojo: Lead, Magic, Scent

For each ability, the player has a pool of 6 points to distribute among the associated skills, no more than 3 for any skill.

Finally, the player chooses one of four equipment packages for the character.

=== Combat and Skill resolution ===
For combat and skill resolution, the player rolls a number of dice equal to the relevant skill, the dice being of the type assigned to the appropriate ability. For example, if a player assigned a 12-sided die to Meat, and a skill total of 3 to Smash, then the player would roll three 12-sided dice when using the Smash skill.

== Publication history ==
Ork! The Roleplaying Game, a 64-page book designed by Todd Miller and Chris Pramas, was the first publication of Green Ronin, released in July 2000. The book described the rules for a light-hearted "beer and pretzels" role-playing game, and also included a sample adventure, "Come on Ork, Come On!",

In 2018, Green Ronin published an expanded 160-page second edition.

== Reception ==
The reviewer from Pyramid commented that "The game itself is simple, and could work very well as an introduction to novice gamers . . . that is, if you want to introduce novice gamers directly to their inner ork."

The Hungarian game review site LGH (Looking for Gamers) rated the original edition 8 out of 10, saying, "Pro: it's fun, it has good ideas, its system is novel (though not new) and it's easy to learn and manage. By contrast, the 64 pages look a little skinny (considering it costs $13), and some of the graphics are terrible."

Patrick Müller form the German Envoyer magazine gave the game a 70 % rating, and found it definitely worth a try. The occasional joke made it fun to read, and the background info on orks could be a resources even for other games. He emphasized that it was a fun role-playing game, one should not expect a full-fledged game system.

== Reviews ==
- Envoyer #84
- Polyhedron #144
