= Michael Easton =

American actor (born 1967)

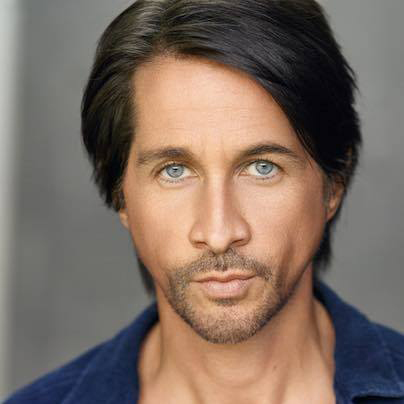
- Born: Michael Easton; February 15, 1967 (age 59); Inglewood, California, US
- Education: University of California, Los Angeles
- Occupation: Actor
- Years active: 1990–present
- Spouse: Ginevra Arabia (m. 2004)
- Children: 2
- Website: https://www.michaeleaston.com/

Michael Easton (born February 15, 1967) is an American film, television and voice actor, writer, and director. Although the Emmy-nominated actor may be best known for his work on the series Ally McBeal, VR.5, Total Recall 2070, One Life to Live and General Hospital, he is also the author of several critically-acclaimed novels, including the trilogy Soul Stealer, and is an accomplished director whose films have earned multiple independent film awards.

== Acting career ==
Born in Inglewood, California, Easton was raised and educated in the US and Ireland. He attended high school and then UCLA when he returned to the United States, and graduated with a double major in English and History.

His first major series role was a two-year stint on NBC's Days of Our Lives, playing Tanner Scofield when he was just 25. While on the show, he was featured in People Magazine’s “50 Most Beautiful Issue” in 1992, and left the role when his mother was diagnosed with ovarian cancer in 1993. Easton returned to Los Angeles to care for her until her death in 1994.

Easton returned to acting in 1995 with Fox's VR.5 as Duncan, co-starring with Fame alumna Lori Singer and Buffy the Vampire Slayer’s Anthony Head. This was followed up with a turn as the lead in showrunner Stephen J. Cannell's Two. He played the dual roles of a Seattle professor who is framed for murder by his previously unknown twin, and is forced to go on the run from the FBI in order to clear himself of his brother's crimes. Easton co-wrote the episode “A.D.”, and also penned the series finale, “The Reckoning”.

In 1997, he landed a role on Damon Wayans’ 413 Hope Street with Jesse L. Martin and Richard Roundtree. Easton played Nick Carrington, a former drug addict and counselor at an inner-city crisis center. The show tackled topics including the struggles of drug addiction and recovery, homelessness, racism, hate crimes, HIV and AIDS, social justice, income inequality, and disproportionate Black conviction and incarceration. Easton later described the experience as one of the most creatively and personally rewarding of his career.

In 1998, Easton was featured in a multi-episode arc of Ally McBeal as Glenn, for which one episode was awarded a Primetime Emmy. He went on to play the role in a short arc on the award-winning series The Practice. Both shows were the brainchildren of producer David E. Kelley. The Showtime series Total Recall 2070 featured him in the leading role as David Hume, a detective partnered with a sentient and self-aware android. The series was shot in Toronto, and is a loose adaptation of Philip K. Dick’s short story "We Can Remember It for You Wholesale" and novel Do Androids Dream of Electric Sheep?. The classic cult film Blade Runner was also a major influence on the series’ narrative tone and visual style, exploring themes of eugenics, class/caste systems, rule by minority, and oligarchy juxtaposed with human rights and individual rights and autonomy.

Easton returned to Daytime with ABC's Port Charles, a spinoff of General Hospital that took a more supernatural turn, as he helped shape and create the vampire antagonist Caleb Morley.

When Port Charles ended, Michael began work as Detective John McBain on One Life to Live in 2003 – a role he played for the next nine years. Easton reprised his One Life to Live role on General Hospital. He rejoined the GH cast on March 22, 2016, playing Dr. Hamilton Finn, an infectious disease specialist and epidemiologist with a penchant for waistcoats and a bearded dragon named Roxy. His performance as the character battled addiction and subsequent struggle in withdrawal and recovery earned him a Daytime Emmy nomination in 2018. He exited the role after eight years, departing with his final episode airing June 27, 2024.

== Writing/Directing ==
Easton is a prolific novelist, screenwriter and director. His 2011 graphic novel trilogy Soul Stealer was a critical success and praised by Ain't It Cool News as "Graphic Novel of the Year" in 2010. The story, combined with artist Christopher Shy's visualizations, made a collaborative partnership of words and pictures.

Easton has also maintained a long friendship with Peter Straub – who had been a dedicated One Life to Live viewer. The author visited the set in New York and left a copy of Koko in Easton's mailbox. It was a novel Michael's mother had loved and which he had been reading to her during her last days of battling cancer. Years later, Easton collaborated with Straub to write the horror graphic novel The Green Woman for DC Comics. Easton's most recent solo novel is Credence, published by Blackwatch Comics.

A member of the Writers Guild of America, Michael also adapted and wrote the screenplay for Daedelus is Dead, a short film based on an unfinished script by Doors legend Jim Morrison. The film has screened at more than a dozen major film festivals and was bought by The Sundance Channel. His feature detailing the life of actor Montgomery Clift is being produced by Relativity Media, while another screenplay about Ella Fitzgerald is in development with Norman Lear.

In 2015, he also wrote and directed short films Dreamliner and the award-winning Ultraviolent – both starring his friend and former OLTL castmate Trevor St. John. In 2020 he teamed up again with St. John, and former co-stars Sherri Saum and Rebecca Budig on the short film About a Girl, written by Budig and directed by Easton. The film won the Outstanding Achievement Award in the 2020 Best Shorts Film Festival, praising the “Deft direction, beautiful craft, and achingly authentic performance by Budig.”

Easton's collection of poetry, Eighteen Straight Whiskeys, was initially written while on a four-month break in Paris, France in the aftermath of his mother's death. The first and second editions of the book both sold out. The 20th Anniversary Collector's Edition was released in 2018, updated with thirty new poems and a new cover design by Chip Kidd. The Hollywood Reporter praised the work as “A 96-page collection of hard-edged musings on drinking and drugs...not flowery paeans to romance, lost love, or lyrical pastoral introspections”

== Books/Screenplays ==
=== Eighteen Straight Whiskeys ===
Eighteen Straight Whiskeys is a collection of poetry. The first printing was in 1994 and the second in 1998; both sold out. A third, signed Collector's Edition with thirty new poems was released by Bowery Press in 2018.

=== Soul Stealer ===
Soul Stealer is a graphic novel series about a Frankenstein-like protagonist, Kalan, who searches for his lost love Oxania over the span of several centuries. The horror-fantasy trilogy was illustrated by artist Christopher Shy and released by Blackwatch Comics, with a foreword by Peter Straub.

=== Credence ===
In 2013, Easton released Credence with Blackwatch Comics.

Easton released a video and special preview edition of the sequel novel, with art by Steven Perkins, at San Diego Comic-Con in 2015.

=== The Green Woman ===
Easton co-wrote The Green Woman for Vertigo Comics (a division of DC Comics) with award-winning horror writer Peter Straub. The artwork was by John Bolton.

Straub's novels have received several notable honors, including the Bram Stoker Award, World Fantasy Award, and International Horror Guild Award. The Green Woman was his first graphic novel collaboration.

=== Screenplays ===
Easton's screenplay Beautiful Loser, a biopic of Montgomery Clift, is currently in development. Producer Norman Lear subsequently tapped him to write the screenplay Queen of Jazz, about Ella Fitzgerald's life and legacy. While working on Two as the series lead, he also wrote the episodes “A.D.” and "The Reckoning".

In 2001 Easton adapted a short film based on an unfinished screenplay by Doors front man Jim Morrison. Daedelus is Dead appeared at more than a dozen film festivals and was later bought by The Sundance Channel.

In 2015, Easton's Ultraviolent, chronicling the last, bizarre night of filmmaker Donald Cammell, won the Best Shorts Showcase at LA Shorts Fest and was awarded the Grand Prize at both the Barcelona and Canadian International Film Festivals. He followed up with First Strike Butcher Knife, which premiered at the 2017 Los Angeles Film Festival.

== Personal life ==
Easton married model Ginevra Arabia in 2004. The couple has two children: Lilah Bell, born on April 15, 2011, and Jack Boru, born on September 7, 2013.

== Filmography ==
Television and film roles
Year	Title	Role	Notes
1992	Shadow of a Stranger	Shawn	
1991–1992	Days of Our Lives	Tanner Scofield	Unknown episodes
1994	Diagnosis: Murder	Rick Bennett	Episode: "Shaker"
1995	VR.5	Duncan	Main role
1996	Two	Gus McClain / Booth Hubbard	Lead role
1997–1998	413 Hope St.	Nick Carrington	Main role
1998	Ally McBeal	Glenn	3 episodes
1998	The Practice	Glenn	Episode: "The Battlefield"; playing the same character as Ally McBeal
1999	Total Recall 2070	David Hume	Lead role
2000	The '70s	Nick	Film
2001; 2002–2003	Port Charles	Michael Morley (Steven Clay); Caleb Morley	Role from: May 11, 2001, to December 3, 2001; Role from: October 25, 2002, to October 3, 2003
2002–2003	Mutant X	Gabriel Ashlocke	Recurring role, 4 episodes
2003–2012	One Life to Live	John McBain	Role from: October 1, 2003, to January 13, 2012
2012–2024	General Hospital	John McBain (OLTL crossover); Caleb Morley (Stephen Clay); Dr. Silas Clay; Hamilton Finn	Role from: March 13, 2012, to March 20, 2013; Role from: February 2013; Role from: May 13, 2013, to August 5, 2015; Role from March 21, 2016, to June 27, 2024
2018	Making Montgomery Clift	Himself	Documentary about the actor Montgomery Clift.

== Books ==
- Easton, Michael (1997). "Eighteen Straight Whiskeys". The Bowery Press. ISBN 0-9658674-0-4.
- Easton, Michael (2008). "Soul Stealer". ISBN 978-0-9809103-6-0.
- Easton, Michael (2009). "Soul Stealer Book Two: Blood and Rain". ISBN 978-0-9809966-5-4.
- Easton, Michael (2010). "Soul Stealer Book Three: Last To Die". ISBN 978-0-9809966-9-2.
- Straub, Peter & Easton, Michael (2010). "The Green Woman". ISBN 978-1-4012-1100-4.
- Easton, Michael (2011). "Soul Stealer The Collector's Edition". ISBN 978-1-926869-04-9.
- Easton, Michael (2013). "Credence". ISBN 978-0-9859804-9-8.

== Awards and nominations ==
Daytime Emmy Awards {}

- 2018: Nominated, Outstanding Lead Actor in a Drama Series – General Hospital

Gemini Awards

- 1999: Nominated, Best Performance by an Actor in a Continuing Leading Dramatic Role – Total Recall 2070

Soap Opera Digest Awards

- 2003: Nominated, Outstanding Younger Lead Actor – Port Charles
- 2005: Won, Favorite Triangle – One Life to Live (shared with Melissa Archer and Renée Elise Goldsberry)
