= The Shaman's Handbook =

The Shaman's Handbook is a 2002 role-playing game supplement published by Green Ronin Publishing.

== Contents ==
The Shaman's Handbook is a supplement in which a new spirit‑wielding core character class is introduced and supported with prestige classes, spells, feats, magic items, lore, and a bestiary to fully integrate shamanic play into any campaign.

== Reviews ==
- Pyramid
- Fictional Reality #9
