= Monsters of the Mind =

2003 role-playing game supplement

Monsters of the Mind is a 2003 role-playing game supplement for the d20 System published by Green Ronin Publishing.

== Contents ==
Monsters of the Mind is a supplement in which a bestiary of more than fifty psionic creatures ranges from asuras and bodhisattvas to psionic undead, constructs, and variants of classic monsters—complete with stats, art, and guidance for using them in Naranjan or any psionic campaign.

== Reviews ==
- Pyramid
- Fictional Reality (Issue 14 - Dec 2003)
- Legions Realm Monthly (Issue 15)
