= The Witch's Handbook =

The Witch's Handbook is a 2002 for d20 System role-playing games published by Green Ronin Publishing.

== Contents ==
The Witch's Handbook is a supplement in which an exploration of hearth‑born magic introduces a new witch core class and supports it with coven rituals, charms, herbal lore, feats, spells, magic items, and prestige classes.

== Reviews ==
- Pyramid
- Fictional Reality (Issue 11 - Mar 2003)
- Legions Realm Monthly (Issue 4 - Dec 2002)
- Campaign Magazine (Issue 7 - Feb/Mar 2003)
