= Arcana: Societies of Magic =

Arcana: Societies of Magic is a 2001 supplement for d20 System role-playing games published by Green Ronin Publishing.

== Contents ==
Arcana: Societies of Magic is a supplement in which six unique magical organizations are presented with histories, goals, leaders, headquarters maps, and new skills, feats, spells, and prestige classes for use in a fantasy campaign.

== Reviews ==
- Pyramid
- Asgard #5 (March, 2002)
