= Creatures of Freeport =

Role-playing game supplement

Creatures of Freeport is a 2004 role-playing game supplement published by Green Ronin Publishing.

== Contents ==
Creatures of Freeport is a supplement in which a bestiary of monsters for Freeport is enriched with lore, harvestable uses, adventure hooks, and sample NPCs.

== Reviews ==
- Pyramid
- Fictional Reality (Issue 17 - Sep 2004)
