= Ultramodern Firearms (Green Ronin Publishing) =

Ultramodern Firearms is a 2002 role-playing game supplement published by Green Ronin Publishing for d20 System.

== Contents ==
Ultramodern Firearms is a supplement in which an illustrated organized arsenal of 350+ modern firearms is presented with complete rules, historical context, and a features index.

== Reviews ==
- Pyramid
- Fictional Reality (Issue 11 - Mar 2003)
- Legions Realm Monthly (Issue 7 - Mar 2003)
- Valkyrie (Issue 27 - 2003)
