= Guide to Hell =

1999 role-playing game accessory

- Genre: Role-playing games
- Publisher: TSR
- Publication date: 1999

Guide to Hell is an accessory for the 2nd edition of the Advanced Dungeons & Dragons fantasy role-playing game, published in 1999.

== Contents ==
Guide to Hell is a supplement which presents to players new spells, magic items, character class kits, and the new half devil/half human race of devilkin. Chapter One offers a new turning table that clerics and paladins can use for turning devils. A short section titled "The Cults" demonstrates how devils use humans as tools in their schemes, and a scenario titled "Invasion" shows devils invade the Prime Material Plane.

== Publication history ==
Guide to Hell was published by TSR and written by Chris Pramas.

== Reception ==
Guide to Hell was reviewed by the online version of Pyramid on November 19, 1999. The reviewer considered this book "a giant rehash that still fails to capture what was in the old articles of Dragon magazine", specifically naming Ed Greenwood's "The Nine Hells Part I and II" from Dragon #75 and #76 and "The Nine Hells Revisited" from Dragon #91, calling them "classics that provided vast amounts of information. The page total on these three articles alone is close to 30 pages. Throw in other articles like "Eight Devilish Questions," (#91) by Ed Greenwood, and "The Lords of the Nine" (#223) by Colin McComb, and you've almost got more pages than the new Guide to Hell has." The reviewer did say that for anyone who does not own those back issues or the Dragon Magazine Archive, "the Guide to Hell offers very modular chapters that should be easy to put in most campaigns", and that the information in Chapter One should "give inexperienced DMs some ideas for devils in their games".

== Reviews ==
- Game Reviews magazine
- Envoyer
