= Torches & Pitchforks (game) =

Card game

Torches & Pitchforks is a 2003 card game published by Green Ronin Publishing.

== Gameplay ==
Torches & Pitchforks is a game in which a fast, lighthearted card game of mobs vs. monsters has players arm their townsfolk, battle creatures, and race to rack up points before rival mobs steal the glory.

== Reviews ==
- Pyramid
- Scrye #68
- Fictional Reality #14
