= Terror in Freeport =

Terror in Freeport is a 2000 role-playing game adventure published by Green Ronin Publishing.

== Contents ==
Terror in Freeport is an adventure in which the player characters deal with cultists and serpent people.

== Reviews ==
- Pyramid
- Backstab (as "Terreur à Freeport")
- Gaming Frontiers (Volume 1 - 2002)
- Coleção Dragon Slayer
