= Tales of Freeport =

Role-playing game adventure

Tales of Freeport is a 2003 role-playing game adventure for the d20 System published by Green Ronin Publishing.

== Contents ==
Tales of Freeport is an adventure in which a four‑adventure collection centers on a serpent‑folk conspiracy and pirate treasure, lost civilizations, intrigue, monsters, and ready‑to‑run hooks, in the City of Adventure.

== Reviews ==
- Pyramid
- Fictional Reality (Issue 13 - Sep 2003)
- Legions Realm Monthly (Issue 15)
