= Mike Nystul =

American role playing game designer

- Born: March 22, 1966 (age 60); Chicago, Illinois, U.S.
- Occupation: Role-playing game designer

Mike Nystul (born March 22, 1966, in Chicago, Illinois) created and wrote numerous role-playing game products in the 1990s.

== Career ==
Nystul got his start in the RPG industry writing books for the Fantasy Hero line from Hero Games, and then in the early 1990s he went on to work for FASA and Mayfair Games. Nystul self-published his new horror role-playing game The Whispering Vault (1993), which he debuted in a limited edition at GenCon 26. The following year, he released an expanded version of the game through his new company Pariah Press, and also published supplements such as Dangerous Prey (1995) and a three-panel gamemaster's screen in 1995. He then worked at TSR for a short time, until 1996. Chris Pramas acquired the rights to The Whispering Vault from Nystul in 1996, and Pramas formed Ronin Arts to publish the game. Nystul also wrote several products for FASA's Shadowrun line, and the Role Aids series published by Mayfair Games, among other material.
