= Philip Reed (game designer) =

American role-playing game designer

Philip J. Reed
- Occupation: Game designer

Philip J. Reed is an American game designer known for his work in role-playing games. He worked for Steve Jackson Games, where he later became the chief operations officer and then the chief executive officer.

== Career ==
Philip J. Reed has worked in the RPG industry since 1995 for West End Games, Privateer Press, Atlas Games, and Steve Jackson Games. Reed began an independent blog in 2002, posting reviews or short articles about games. In September 2002, Reed released the PDF 101 Spellbooks (2002) for the d20 system. Reed sold his first PDFs from his website under the Spider Bite Games imprint. In 2006, Reed released the ePublishing 101 PDF series.

In 2003, Reed and artist Christopher Shy created Ronin Arts.The company 54°40' Orphyte sold the rights to Pacesetter Ltd's game Star Ace to Reed, for which he created a website in 2003 publish a d20 version of it, but the website lasted only a year. In 2004, Reed left Steve Jackson Games to work on Ronin Arts full-time. Michael Hammes and Reed wrote 4c System (2007) as a retro-clone to the Marvel Super Heroes role-playing game system from TSR.

In 2007, Reed went back to work at Steve Jackson Games, becoming its COO in 2008. He became the CEO of Steve Jackson Games in 2014. Reed joined Kickstarter's inaugural Community Advisory Council in 2002, a group formed to provide creative insight and help the platform identify issues, opportunities, and questions it might otherwise miss.

In 2023, Reed stepped back from his role as CEO of Steve Jackson Games after a long tenure, reducing his time commitment to focus on health and personal projects, but remained involved with the company as Art Director, continued to lead crowdfunding efforts, and served on the Senior Staff and Board of Directors.

== See also ==
- The Book of Unusual Treasures
