= Medieval Player's Manual =

Role-playing game supplement

Medieval Player's Manual is a 2004 role-playing game supplement published by Green Ronin Publishing.

== Contents ==
Medieval Player's Manual is a supplement in which the age of Christianity and crusades is recreated, providing historically grounded rules for medieval adventures.

== Reviews ==
- Pyramid
- Backstab
- Fictional Reality (Issue 16 - Jun 2004)
- Pyramid (Volume 3, Issue 10 - Aug 2009)
