= Bastards & Bloodlines: A Guidebook to Half-Breeds =

2003 role-playing game supplement

Bastards & Bloodlines: A Guidebook to Half-Breeds is a 2003 role-playing game supplement for d20 System published by Green Ronin Publishing.

== Contents ==
Bastards & Bloodlines: A Guidebook to Half-Breeds is a supplement in which a comprehensive toolkit for creating, playing, and customizing crossbreeds and half‑races, offers dozens of new races, templates, feats, classes, spells, and DM guidelines that expand fantasy campaigns for mixed‑heritage characters.

== Reviews ==
- Pyramid
- Fictional Reality (Issue 12 - Jun 2003)
- Legions Realm Monthly (Issue 11 - Jul 2003)
