= The Vortex of Madness and Other Planar Perils =

Dungeons & Dragons adventure module

- Authors: Chris Pramas
- First published: 2000

The Vortex of Madness and Other Planar Perils is an adventure module for the 2nd edition of the Advanced Dungeons & Dragons fantasy role-playing game.

== Plot summary ==
The Vortex of Madness and Other Planar Perils is a set of five outer planes adventures for high level player characters which were designed to be run separately or run together.

These adventures are structured so that encounters involve more than just monsters to fight. The eponymous adventure "The Vortex of Madness" involves a powerful prisoner held in a magical prison on the plane of Limbo, which provides a location to connect to the locations from the other adventures.

== Publication history ==
The Vortex of Madness and Other Planar Perils was published by Wizards of the Coast and written by Chris Pramas.

== Reception ==
The Vortex of Madness and Other Planar Perils was reviewed by the online version of Pyramid on July 14, 2000. Although the cover proclaims that the adventures are intended "For High Level Heroes!", the reviewer notes that "there are no recommended levels to be found within. My estimation is that you would want to be at least 9th and probably at most 14th level to adventure in these areas – lower level adventurers will not have the spells and abilities to handle the challenges within. Adventurers of much higher levels would need to have the challenges boosted in power to give them a run for their money."
