= VR.5 =

- Created by: Jeannine Renshaw
- Starring: Lori Singer; Michael Easton; Will Patton; Anthony Head; David McCallum; Louise Fletcher; Tracey Needham
- Composer: John Frizzell
- Country of origin: United States
- Original language: English
- No. of episodes: 13 (3 unaired in original run)

Production
- Running time: 44 min (approx.)
- Production companies: Samoset Productions; Rysher Entertainment

Original release
- Network: Fox
- Release: March 10 – May 12, 1995

VR.5 is an American science-fiction television series first broadcast on the Fox network from March 10 to May 12, 1995. Ten of its thirteen episodes were aired during its original run. The title of the show refers to the degree of immersion the protagonist experiences in virtual reality.

== Plot ==
Prior to the events of the series, Sydney Bloom was the daughter of Dr. Joseph Bloom, a computer scientist who was working on developing virtual reality. His wife Nora Bloom, a neurochemist, was also involved in the project. Sydney's father, and her sister Samantha, died in a car accident in 1978.

Now in 1995, Sydney is a telephone lineworker and computer hobbyist. One day, she accidentally discovers that she can enter an advanced type of virtual reality, where she can interact with other people. Her actions in the virtual world have an effect on the real world. She subsequently agrees to use her abilities to help a mysterious secret organization called the Committee. She receives her covert assignments from Frank Morgan, and later from Oliver Sampson. Sydney's friend Duncan advises her and helps her when he can.

The show frequently uses inconsistencies in continuity and a distinctive color scheme as clues to suggest what is actually happening at various points throughout the series.

== Cast ==
- Lori Singer as Sydney Bloom
- Michael Easton as Duncan
- Will Patton as Frank Morgan (episodes 1–4)
- Anthony Head as Oliver Sampson (episodes 5–13)
- David McCallum as Joseph Bloom
- Louise Fletcher as Nora Bloom
- Tracey Needham as Samantha Bloom

== Production ==
=== Development ===
VR.5, a mid-season replacement, debuted shortly after the rise to popularity of The X-Files, and executive producer Thania St. John stated that "VR will try to capture that same, creepy feeling."

=== Filming ===
The show's visual effects for when characters were inside virtual reality were created by shooting on black-and-white film and then manually adding color to each image. This effect took four weeks to create for each episode and added to the cost of the show, which was about U.S. $1.5 million per episode. While distributor Rysher Entertainment never confirmed it, the high cost of the production, coupled with a difficult time slot, contributed to the show's commercial failure.

=== Music ===
The music for VR.5 was created by composer John Frizzell. The opening theme music came to Frizzell in a dream. Dee Carstensen and Eileen Frizzell provided the vocals in the opening theme. The music supervisor of the series was Abby Treloggen. A soundtrack CD was released in 1995 on the Zoo Entertainment/BMG Music label.

== Episodes ==
No.	Title	Directed by	Written by	Original release date	UK order
1	"Pilot"	Michael Katleman	Thania St. John	March 10, 1995	1
A tech wizard with tragic past discovers that she can use her top of the line photo-realistic VR tech to bring people into her VR world via phone and see or alter their subconsciousness. She uses this on her date to see if he is a creep, and is later recruited into a mysterious organization called the Committee. Guest stars: David McCallum (Dr. Joseph Bloom), Louise Fletcher (Nora Bloom), Kimberly Cullum (Young Samantha Bloom), Kaci Williams (Young Sydney Bloom), Noah Verduzco (Unknown), Chris Owen (III) (Harassing boy), Penn Jillette (Orwell Kravitz), Adam Baldwin (Scott Cooper), Stephen Mills (The Committee's Agent), Robert Picardo (VR Engineer), Gammy Singer (Nurse Jackie), Matthew Koruba (Young Duncan)
2	"Dr. Strangechild"	Michael Katleman	Eric Blakeney	March 17, 1995	2
On her first VR assignment for the Committee, Sydney must find an unhappy and spiteful teenage genius - who after making a momentous discovery has run away from the top secret weapons research establishment where he worked - before he can do any harm. During her search, Sydney must try to deal with her own sense of solitude. Guest stars: Louise Fletcher (Nora Bloom), David McCallum (Dr. Joseph Bloom), Dan Riley (Orderly), Elya Baskin (Dr. Zoloft), Tom Towles (Shepard), Nicholas Cascone (Unknown), Erick Avari (Boise), Aaron Michael Metchik (Stuart Fischer), Kate Zentall (Mrs. Fischer), Cully Fredrickson (Unknown), Danny Goldring (Traxell), Jason Azikiwe (Unknown)
3	"Sisters"	John Sacret Young	John Sacret Young	TBA	12
Sydney investigates the mind of Janine, a cashier at her workplace whom she discovers is stealing. Sydney herself gets pulled into the excitements and thrills of these criminal activities. Guest stars: David McCallum (Dr. Joseph Bloom), Kimberly Cullum (Young Samantha Bloom), Kaci Williams (Young Sydney Bloom), Colleen Flynn (Janine Messersmith), Willie Garson (Pervert)
4	"Love and Death"	Rob Bowman	Thania St. John	March 24, 1995	3
Sydney is assigned to subconsciously prod Jackson Boothe, a troubled employee of the Committee, into returning to work. In doing so, Sydney discovers that Booth is an assassin. Guest stars: Louise Fletcher (Nora Bloom), David McCallum (Dr. Joseph Bloom), Kimberly Cullum (Young Samantha Bloom), George DelHoyo (Jackson Boothe), Carl Strano (Mr. Spire), Louis Turenne (Larry Oldman), Jessica Hendra (Megan Fellows), Peter Spellos (Albert Fellows, Jr), Shane Sweet (Albert Fellows, Sr), Bethany Clifton (Unknown), Wendi Westbrook (Unknown), Sandra Robinson (Monique Fellows)
5	"5D"	D.J. Caruso	John Sacret Young & Thania St. John	March 31, 1995	4
Oliver Sampson becomes Sydney's new contact for the Committee, and he pushes her into trying to trace who hired Boothe for his most recent assassination. Guest stars: Louise Fletcher (Nora Bloom), David McCallum (Dr. Joseph Bloom), Kimberly Cullum (Young Samantha Bloom), Kaci Williams (Young Sydney Bloom), Dan O'Herlihy (Dr. Alloysius Hunnicut), George DelHoyo (Jackson Boothe), Matthew Koruba (Young Duncan), Jim Holmes (Unknown), Keith Mills (Unknown)
6	"Escape"	Jim Charleston	Story by : Thania St. John; Teleplay by : John Sacret Young & Thania St. John	April 7, 1995	5
Sydney is kidnapped by a faction of the Committee who brutally question her to discover her secret. She manages to contact Duncan for help, and he enters into VR in search of her. Oliver is somehow in possession of the journal of Sydney's father, but is he on Sydney's side? Guest stars: David Selburg, Aileen Fitzpatrick (Nurse), Dayton Callie (Unknown), Robert Kempf (Unknown)
7	"Facing the Fire"	Lorraine Senna Ferrara	Jeannine Renshaw	April 14, 1995	6
Oliver instructs Sydney to make a VR link to a test pilot in a psychiatric hospital. The pilot keeps seeing fire and hates his father. Sydney enters the hospital disguised as a patient but has trouble separating his memories from her own. Guest stars: Shirley Knight (Dr. Margo Hirsch), Frank Converse (General Jackson), Neal McDonough (Lance Jackson), Blair Renshaw (Aircraft Mechanic), Richie Fenner (Young Lance), Kevin Carr (Unknown)
8	"Simon's Choice"	Steve Dubin	Toni Graphia	April 21, 1995	7
Sydney enters VR to probe the mind of a self-confessed traitor scheduled for execution to find out why he did it. She discovers he was being blackmailed by people who held his son hostage, and in the process, Sydney must come to terms with her anger towards her own father. Guest stars: Kaci Williams (Young Sydney Bloom), Robert Davi (Simon Buchanan), Dustin Nguyen (Ky Buchanan), David Brisbin (Unknown), Jack Rader (Unknown), Robert Phelan (Unknown), Endre Hules (Spy Chief), Edmund L. Shaff (Unknown), Westin Blakeney (Unknown), Benjamin Jurand (Unknown), Yuan Gee Wong (Unknown)
9	"Send Me an Angel"	Jim Charleston	Naomi Janzen & Jeannine Renshaw	TBA	11
Sydney decides to take a holiday from her work at the Committee and returns to her childhood home in Pasadena. The previous inhabitants claim the house is possessed by demons, while his daughter insists an angel saved her life during a fire. Guest stars: Louise Fletcher (Nora Bloom), Tracey Needham (Samantha Bloom), Armelia McQueen (Unknown), Barbara K. Whinnery (Unknown), William Forward (Unknown), Jamie Renee Smith (Rebecca), Stephen Mills (The Committee's Agent), Kenneth Robert Shippy (Unknown), Gammy Singer (Nurse Jackie)
10	"Control Freak"	Michael Katleman	Naomi Janzen	April 28, 1995	8
When an armed man takes hostages in an air traffic control tower, Sydney is ordered to establish a VR link. In the process, she discovers a cover-up over the reason for a crash several years earlier. Guest stars: Markus Flanagan (Kyle Jarvis), Tom Mardirosian (Ed Paterson), Stephen Root (F.A.A. Negotiator), Richard Penn (Unknown), Carol Kiernan (Unknown), Frank Whiteman (Unknown), Johnny Moran (Unknown), Cynthia Avila (Matilda)
11	"The Many Faces of Alex"	John Sacret Young	Jacquelyn Blain	May 5, 1995	9
An increasingly careless and disillusioned Oliver assigns Sydney to an unknown contact. This contact turns out to be Oliver's former lover, Alex, who may know the whereabouts of Sydney's father. Guest stars: Mark Phelan, Kathleen Misko, Jeannine Renshaw, Markie Post (Alex Miller), Tracey Needham (Samantha Bloom)
12	"Parallel Lives"	Michael Katleman	John Sacret Young & Thania St. John & John Shirley & Jeannine Renshaw	TBA	13
Duncan awakens in a mirror universe - an alternate reality perfectly opposite to the one he knows, in which Sam is alive and Sydney is dead. Guest stars: David McCallum (Dr. Joseph Bloom), Will Patton (Dr. Frank Morgan), Tracey Needham (Samantha Bloom), Penn Jillette (Orwell Kravitz), Billy Burke (Marco)
13	"Reunion"	Deborah Reinisch	Thania St. John	May 12, 1995	10
Sydney and her sister Samantha are reunited and, along with Duncan, they enter VR5 to discover what really happened the night of the car crash. Guest stars: Louise Fletcher (Nora Bloom), David McCallum (Dr. Joseph Bloom), Kimberly Cullum (Young Samantha Bloom), Kaci Williams (Young Sydney Bloom), Tracey Needham (Samantha Bloom), Turhan Bey (Abernathy), Stephen Mills (The Committee's Agent), Gammy Singer (Nurse Jackie), Matthew Koruba (Young Duncan)

"Sisters," "Send Me An Angel," and "Parallel Lives" were not broadcast on Fox. However, they were broadcast in countries such as Canada, Norway, France and the United Kingdom. The series was eventually shown in its entirety on the Sci Fi Channel. The episode "Sisters" was not aired in the UK to make room for an "X-Files" documentary.

== Legacy ==
The series was broadcast on CBS Drama in Europe in early 2014.

Virtual Storm, an online community, lobbied Fox to develop a movie featuring the cast and crew of VR.5, but the project was dropped after the scripting stage.

== Home media ==
Episodes of VR.5 were released on VHS in 2000 by Rhino Home Video.
