= Two (TV series) =

Canadian drama television series

- Created by: Charles Grant Craig
- Starring: Michael Easton; Barbara Tyson; Lochlyn Munro
- Composer: Christophe Beck
- Country of origin: Canada
- Original language: English
- No. of seasons: 1
- No. of episodes: 22

Production
- Executive producers: Michael J. Taylor; Stephen J. Cannell; David Levinson
- Running time: 60 minutes
- Production companies: Two Television Productions; Telegenic Programs Inc. New World Television

Original release
- Network: CTV Television Network
- Release: September 12, 1996 – June 7, 1997

Two is a Canadian drama series which aired in syndication from September 1996 to June 1997.

== Production ==
Premiering in September 1996, the syndicated drama series had 24 episodes and ran until 1997. The actor Adam Storke originally was chosen to play the main character, but the producer Stephen J. Cannell chose Easton to take over since he felt Easton was more appropriate for the role.

It was originally developed by CBS for Cannell Entertainment, but it ended up appearing in syndication.

Due to low ratings, the show was canceled after one year.

== Synopsis ==
It featured Michael Easton as Gus McClain, a college professor from Seattle who is framed for the murder of his wife by his twin brother Booth Hubbard (Easton in a dual role). Hubbard, whose existence had previously been unknown to McClain, committed several murders while assuming McClain's identity, leaving Gus on the run from the FBI. Complicating matters more was that Booth had a brain tumor that could kill him at any moment and leave Gus without a way to clear himself. The primary FBI investigator in the case was Theresa "Terry" Carter (Barbara Tyson), whose partner was a victim of Hubbard and does not believe his claims of a twin brother. It featured Andrew Sikes as a recurring character trying to help McClain.

== Cast ==
- Michael Easton as Gus McClain/Booth Hubbard
- Barbara Tyson as Theresa "Terry" Carter

== Episodes ==
No.	Title	Directed by	Written by	Original release date
TBA	"Pilot"	Anthony Hickox	TBA	TBA
1	"Two"	David Warry-Smith	Charlie Craig	September 12, 1996
2	"A.D."	David Warry-Smith	Michael Easton & Kathy McCormick	September 19, 1996
3	"Dream Prisoner"	David Warry-Smith	Mark Cullen	September 26, 1996
4	"Many Happy Returns"	James Head	Tim Minear	October 3, 1996
5	"Black Ops"	James Head	Gerry Conway	October 10, 1996
6	"Russian Hill"	Rene Bonniere	Steve Feke	October 17, 1996
7	"Games People Play"	Mario Azzopardi	Steve Feke & David Levinson	October 24, 1996
8	"Armies of the Night"	Martin Wood	Anne Collins	October 31, 1996
9	"Victoria's Secret"	Allan Eastman	Story by : Edward Gold; Teleplay by : Mark Cullen	November 7, 1996
10	"No Man's Land"	Rene Bonniere	Jason Cahill	November 14, 1996
11	"Reunion"	Brad Turner	Joe Yogerst	November 21, 1996
12	"Prodigal"	Ken Girotti	David Levinson	November 28, 1996
13	"Leap of Faith"	Brad Turner	Kathy McCormick	January 9, 1997
14	"Sink or Swim"	Perci Young	Joe Yogerst	January 16, 1997
15	"Prom Night"	David Warry-Smith	Steve Feke & David Levinson	January 23, 1997
16	"The Nun Story"	Mario Azzopardi	Steve Feke	January 30, 1997
17	"Between the Lines"	David Warry-Smith	Genia Shipman	February 6, 1997
18	"Bad Company"	Brad Turner	William Bigelow	February 13, 1997
19	"The Reckoning"	Paul Birkett	Michael Easton	February 20, 1997
20	"Chain Gang"	James Head	Story by : Kathy McCormick; Teleplay by : Steve Feke & David Levinson	May 17, 1997
21	"Forget Me Not"	David Warry-Smith	Frederick Rappaport	May 31, 1997
22	"Tale of the Tape"	David Warry-Smith	Story by : Joyce Burditt & Dan Polier; Teleplay by : Joyce Burditt	June 7, 1997

== Reception ==
The Toronto Star television critic Jim Bawden praised the show, saying "if it's played out properly", it could be like The Fugitive. Saying the series "sports a sleek look", he said main character "Easton makes us believe, through subtle gestures, that there are two of him". The Los Angeles Times's Jon Matsumoto said, Two offers a less compelling set of circumstances than The Fugitive since "the professor knows the identity and motives of the real killer" and "It's also difficult to believe that an innocent man with an unblemished past could be successfully framed for not one but five murders committed by his brother."
