= The Psychic's Handbook =

The Psychic's Handbook is a 2004 role-playing game supplement published by Green Ronin Publishing.

== Contents ==
Psychic's Handbook is a supplement in which a standalone, skill‑ and feat‑based psychic class is introduced, and a full system of subtle, wide‑ranging mental powers, supported by prestige classes, equipment, and campaign guidance to integrate psychic abilities distinctly from magic.

== Reviews ==
- Pyramid
- Fictional Reality (Issue 15 - Mar 2004)
