= True20 =

Role-playing game system

- True20 Adventure Roleplaying
- Designers: Steve Kenson
- Publishers: Green Ronin Publishing
- Publication: 2005
- Genres: Universal
- Systems: True20

True20 is a role-playing game system designed by Steve Kenson and published by Green Ronin Publishing. True20 is similar to other game systems such as d20, but it has a few different mechanics. The system was first published as a part of the Blue Rose RPG before being published as a standalone universal generic role-playing game, True20 Adventure Roleplaying.

== History ==
The True20 system was originally used in Green Ronin's Blue Rose, itself based on their Mutants & Masterminds RPG. Later that year, Green Ronin released a PDF distillation of the Blue Rose rules, with an appendix of some modern-era rules, as a generic form of the game. This was followed by an expanded hardcover release in 2006. A revised softcover rulebook, combining the rules section of the True20 Adventure Roleplaying book with the True20 Companion was released in April 2008.

== Settings ==
The original setting for the system was the Blue Rose in which the system first saw print. In its generic role-playing game, the original hardcover printing of the True20 Adventure Roleplaying book included four sample settings. These were chosen among publisher submitted setting with the winners announced in Dragon Magazine:

- "Caliphate Nights", an Arabian Nights-style fantasy version of the golden age of Islam, circa 800 AD. A full-color standalone hardcover was released for the setting at Origins 2006.
- "Lux Aeternum", a swashbuckling space opera.
- "Mecha vs. Kaiju", in which giant robots protect Japan from monsters.
- "Borrowed Time", a setting of Kung Fu action and gunplay against a backdrop of time-controlling conspiracies.

The Revised Edition offers sections on fantasy, space, horror and modern adventures. A follow-up volume, True20 Worlds of Adventure, includes five additional settings, ranging from "Land of the Crane", based in an imaginary land based on medieval Japan, to "The Razor in the Apple", a horror setting based on the idea of children battling monsters.

== System ==
Utilizing the Open Gaming License, True20 is derived from Wizards of the Coast's d20 System. Differences from the parent game include the following:

Ability scores are given as simple modifiers (+1, +2, etc.) and not as a statistic in the range of 3 to 18. A single 20-sided die is used for each roll. Instead of hit points, characters experience "damage conditions" as in Mutants & Masterminds.

Character classes are the "roles" of Adept (users of psychic powers or magic), Expert and Warrior. There are no class-specific or restricted skills. Any characters of any role can have any skill. Magic spells are treated as feats and do not have "levels". New feats are available at each level and characters increase in level at the GM's discretion, rather than by accumulation of experience points, which do not exist here.

== Licenses and third-party products ==
Since before its release, the True20 system has been open to users under the terms of the Open Gaming License. Use of True20 logo required a separate license and license fee purchased from Green Ronin. Several companies have taken advantage of this to produce their own True20 titles. Chris Pramas of Green Ronin Publishing made a new, free licensing agreement with third-party publishers to produce True20 products in April 2008. Details were posted on the company's website and forums, and met with praise from publishers, freelancers and players alike.

== Reviews ==
- Pyramid

== See also ==
- Blue Rose
- Mutants & Masterminds (the system's damage mechanics are shared with this game)
