= Dungeons of Despair =

1999 role-playing game adventure

Dungeons of Despair is a 1999 role-playing game adventure published by TSR for Advanced Dungeons & Dragons.

== Plot summary ==
Dungeons of Despair is a collection of six adventures for low-level player characters.

== Reviews ==
- Envoyer
- Backstab #15
