= The Apocalypse Stone =

Dungeons & Dragons adventure module

- Authors: Jason Carl and Chris Pramas
- First published: 2000

The Apocalypse Stone is an adventure module for the 2nd edition of the Advanced Dungeons & Dragons fantasy role-playing game. It was published in 2000.

== Plot summary ==
The Apocalypse Stone is an adventure designed for 4-6 player characters that have reached level 15 or higher. It is intended to be the final adventure of a long-running role-playing campaign, which is expected to bring about the end of a campaign world.

== Publication history ==
The Apocalypse Stone was published by Wizards of the Coast, and was written by Jason Carl and Chris Pramas.

== Reception ==
The Apocalypse Stone was reviewed in Volume 2 of Pyramid on January 21, 2000. The reviewer noted that the adventure is designed for powerful characters and noted that it "would work best as part of a seriously long-running (years at least) campaign". The reviewer remained intentionally vague about "the details of the bigger picture of this adventure as the potential enjoyment of this adventure depends heavily upon the DM keeping his/her players in the dark as to what's really going on. If you run this one correctly your players won't be disappointed. They may very well end up seriously ticked off, but not disappointed."

== Reviews ==
- Coleção Dragon Slayer
