= Credence (film) =

- Directed by: Mike Buonaiuto
- Written by: Mike Buonaiuto
- Produced by: Mike Buonaiuto; Bryce Thomason
- Starring: Alex Hammond; Anthony Topham; Tia Kenny
- Cinematography: Leighton Cox
- Music by: James Maloney (Score)
- Distributed by: Shape History
- Release date: 17 May 2015
- Country: UK
- Language: English

Credence is a 2015 British Sci-fi film written and directed by Mike Bonauto. It stars Alex Hammond, Anthony Topsham and Tia Kenny. Credence is the story of a family of two torn gay fathers, who sacrifice their lives to save their daughter in the last evacuation from the Earth, before its devastation.

Credence is challenging standard LGBT portrayal in films, and follows Bonauto's previous campaigns #LoveAlwaysWins, Homecoming, and Invisible Parents. Credence premiered on 17 May 2015 at the Prince Charles Cinema.

== Plot ==
Credence portrays a family torn apart during the last evacuation on earth after violent storms have made continued survival on the planet impossible. Hope has been found in the form of new worlds that support human life, however due to limited rocket capacity and life expectancy only children are permitted to evacuate, and even then only the rich have ended up getting tickets. Two fathers decide to make the ultimate sacrifice, to ensure the survival of their daughter, and the entire human race.

== Production ==
The preview production for the film began in early 2014. The Director described his concept as “a universal message that in any kind of tragedy it's important that couples come together and support one another,”. Filming took place in a house on the coast of Norfolk (England). On 13 July 2014, a crowdfunding campaign was launched on Indiegogo to support film production. The campaign raised £6,000 in three days, and by the end it had £22,189 ($37,090). filming began on 8 January 2015, and was finished 4 days later.

== Cast ==
- Richie Stephens as Luis
- Alex Hammond as Scott
- Anthony Topham as John
- Tia Kenny as Ellie

== Soundtrack ==
The soundtrack features the score, composed by James Maloney, and a song by Craig Sutherland (feat. Lucien Dante).
