= Christopher Shy =

Artist

Christopher Shy, also known by the pen name "Ronin", is a freelance fantasy and science fiction artist.

== Biography ==
Christopher Shy created Studio Ronin in 1994 to highlight his art. With George Vasilakos, Shy conceived the zombie RPG All Flesh Must Be Eaten (2000). In 2003, he joined forces with author Philip J. Reed to create the company Ronin Arts. His work includes character portraits for White Wolf's Mage: The Ascension (Revised Edition) and Good Apollo, I'm Burning Star IV, Volume One: From Fear Through the Eyes of Madness, a graphic novel written by Claudio Sanchez. He is also the founder of Studio Ronin and the co-founder of Ronin Arts. His graphic novel Pathfinder is an adaptation of the 2007 film of the same name. He also provided the art for Ascend, which has a web version called Ascend: Divination.

=== 2007-2013 ===
In 2007, Shy and Studio Ronin released Silent Leaves: The Last Bondsmen and Silent Leaves: Exceptions To Life, the first two installments of a four-part graphic novel series. Both books were written and drawn by Shy. In 2008, Shy was the conceptual designer for the 2009 remake of Friday the 13th, directed by Marcus Nispel. This marks Shy's second film with the director, Pathfinder being the first. In 2009, Shy illustrated the graphic novel versions of Call of Duty and Frost Road, both written and directed Keith Arem. He also illustrated Soul Stealer with Michael Easton, followed by Soul Stealer: Blood and Rain. Shy did the art for the graphic novel Rise of the Warrior, a prequel story for the 2013 PlayStation 3 video game, God of War: Ascension. The graphic novel only ran on GodofWar.com, from October 22, 2012, to March 19, 2013.

== Reception ==
In a review of Ascend, Publishers Weekly opined that "Shy's artwork for this quasi-religious melodrama is state of the art and then some". In its review of Pathfinder, Booklist wrote that "Shy's artwork adds a dreamlike quality to Kalogridis' telling, blurring the symbolism and tempering the violence by veiling the details in a dark, smoky palette." His art for Pathfinder was described as "amazing" by critic Derrik Quenzer in The Oregonian.

== Bibliography ==
- Ascend (with Keith Arem, Image Comics, 120 pages, paperback, ISBN 1-58240-430-5, hardcover, ISBN 1-60010-138-0, 2005, Special Edition, IDW Publishing, 200 pages, paperback, ISBN 1-60010-137-2, hardcover, ISBN 1-58240-518-2, 2008)
