= Soul Stealer =

- Front cover
- Creator: Michael Easton; Christopher Shy
- Date: 2010
- Publisher: Black Watch Comics

Soul Stealer is a graphic novel written by Michael Easton, with art by Christopher Shy and published by Black Watch Comics. It was named Graphic Novel of the Year by 'Ain't it Cool News in 2010. Soul Stealer is an explicit tale of horror and fantasy that follows the pieced-together, Frankenstein-like hero, Kalan, on a centuries-long search for his eternal love, the beautiful Oxania.

== Reviews ==
Keith Howell for Ain’t It Cool News said, "It will be one of the most profound experiences you will ever remember in sitting back to read a graphic novel."
