= Steve Kenson =

American writer and game designer

- Born: June 16, 1969 (age 57)
- Occupations: Writer, designer, RPG
- Notable work: Mutants and Masterminds
- Partners: Christopher Penczak; Adam Sartwell

Steve Kenson (born June 16, 1969) is a writer and designer of role-playing games (RPGs) and related fiction.

== Career ==
Steve Kenson began working as an author and game designer in 1995. Kenson co-wrote the super-hero role-playing game Silver Age Sentinels, which was published by Guardians of Order in 2002. As he worked on the game, Kenson also created a setting called Freedom City to be used with Silver Age Sentinels, but when he pitched the setting to Guardians of Order they were not interested. Chris Pramas of Green Ronin Publishing asked Kenson to design a new d20-based superhero role-playing game, so Kenson developed Mutants & Masterminds in 2002 and his Freedom City setting was published in 2003. Kenson was made the line developer for Mutants & Masterminds in 2004, and became a more regular contributor to products from Green Ronin. Kenson worked with John Snead to produce Blue Rose, a romantic fantasy role-playing game published by Green Ronin in 2005. Kenson designed the Paragons setting for Mutants & Masterminds, which Green Ronin published in 2007.

His most notable creation is the d20 System superhero roleplaying game Mutants & Masterminds for Green Ronin Publishing, which won multiple ENnie awards. He also designed True20 Adventure Roleplaying and the Freedom City campaign setting for Green Ronin. He has written material for many RPGs, including: Aberrant, Champions, DC Universe, the Marvel Super-Heroes Adventure Game, Shadowrun, Silver Age Sentinels, and his Mutants and Masterminds.

He has written nine RPG tie-in novels: seven for the original Shadowrun series, one for Crimson Skies, and one for MechWarrior. He wrote a first trilogy of Shadowrun books produced by WizKids Games after they acquired the Shadowrun property from FASA Corporation: Born to Run, Poison Agendas, and Fallen Angels.

In 1993, Kenson helped to found Nashua Outright, a social/support group for gay, lesbian, bisexual, and questioning youth and their allies in Nashua, New Hampshire. He worked with the group as a volunteer facilitator for thirteen years.

Kenson became a full-time freelance writer for RPGs in 1995. In 2004, he became a line developer for Green Ronin Publishing, the publisher of Mutants & Masterminds and True20. He cowrote the Dungeons & Dragons manual Exemplars of Evil (2007). Kenson was also the lead designer for the 2015 Dungeons & Dragons adventure book Out of the Abyss, a collaboration between Wizards of the Coast and Green Ronin. In 2010, Kenson published ICONS Superpowered Role Playing, a rules-light superhero RPG. A revised and expanded ICONS Assembled was published through Green Ronin in 2014. Icons is currently supported by Kenson's publishing mark, Ad Infinitum Adventures, and is available through DriveThruRPG.com .

Kenson lives in Merrimack, New Hampshire, with his partners, Christopher Penczak and Adam Sartwell.

== Awards and honors ==
Mutants and Masterminds

- 2003 EN World "ENnie" Award – Best d20 Game

Mutants & Masterminds: Ultimate Power

- 2007 En World "ENnie" Award – Best Art, Interior
- 2007 En World "ENnie" Award – Best Rules
- 2007 En World "ENnie" Award – Best d20/d20 OGL Product
- 2015 GamersTable Appreciation Award
