= The Green Woman =

2010 graphic horror novel

Cover art by John Bolton

The Green Woman is a graphic horror novel written by Michael Easton and Peter Straub, with artwork by John Bolton. It was published by Vertigo Comics (a division of DC Comics) in 2010.

The story follows Fielding "Fee" Bandolier—the main character of Straub's Blue Rose Trilogy, as he plans to effectively retire from his serial-killer career. At the same time, New York Detective Bob Steele is equally determined to hunt Fee down and capture him in a final attempt to earn his own redemption. The two characters end up meeting and ultimately confronting their individual fates at an abandoned, run down pub called "The Green Woman".

The novel received generally favorable reviews; critics cautioned readers regarding the story's violence, horror themes and often gory content. Ain't It Cool News warned that "this is a serial killer story, so any reader needs to know that up front", also noting parallels to the serial killers in Neil Gaiman's The Sandman and the television series Dexter.

Publishers Weekly praised the realistic, "richly textured, vertiginous" style of Bolton's visuals and the "non-linear storytelling" by Straub and Easton, while ComicPress called it "a most disturbing and compelling tale".
