= Dragon Age (role-playing game) =

Tabletop role-playing game

Dragon Age RPG
- Designers: Chris Pramas
- Publishers: Green Ronin Publishing
- Publication: January 25, 2010
- Years active: 2010 – 2019
- Genres: Dark fantasy
- Systems: Dragon Age system
- Series: Dragon Age
- Playing time: Varies
- Chance: Dice rolling
- Skills: Role-playing, improvisation, tactics
- Media type: Tabletop role-playing game

Dragon Age is a tabletop role-playing game published by Green Ronin Publishing from 2010 to 2019. It is based on the Dragon Age video game series by BioWare, and uses the video game series' setting.

== Description ==
The game uses traditional tabletop role playing game features, such as character classes (fighter, mage and rogue), races (human, dwarf or elf), and ability scores.

Gameplay in the system centers around the use of three six-sided dice for all rolls. One die, called the "dragon die", is differently colored than the other two. When doubles appear on any roll, the player can perform special actions called "stunts", based on the value on the dragon die.

== Publication history ==
Dragon Age: Set 1 was released on January 25, 2010. Shannon Appelcline, in the book Designers & Dragons (2011), commented that the project was "initiated by BioWare, which highlighted Green Ronin's position of importance within the industry". Chris Pramas designed the "simple class-and-level system" for the game. Pramas explained that the stunt system originated as "a dynamic critical hit system" where doubles on any of three dice rolled "generated a number of stunt points" which "could be spent on a menu of various maneuvers". He noted that doubles occur "almost 50% of the time" and added "tension in every attack roll" – the popularity of "combat stunts" in playtesting led to the addition of "spell stunts in the initial release" of the game which were then followed by other stunt types such as "roleplaying and exploration stunts".

The game's initial release was as a boxed set including a Player's Guide, Game Master's Guide, map of Ferelden and three dice, and covered characters of levels 1 through 5. Pramas believed releasing the game as a boxset would "improve its accessibility". That year, Green Ronin also released a corresponding Game Master's Kit (2010), which included a gamemaster's screen and an adventure, and the supplement Dragon Age: Blood in Ferelden (2010), which included three full-length adventures and three scenario seeds. Dragon Age: Set 2 (2011) and Dragon Age: Set 3 (2014), covering levels 6–10 and 11–20 respectively, were later released. The Dragon Age: Duty Unto Death adventure (2013) originated as the module Pramas ran in the Dragon Age episodes for the web series TableTop; Green Ronin then released it as a free PDF.

A single hardcover compilation and update of the rules, titled Dragon Age RPG Core Rulebook, was released in May 2015. The initial set was based on Dragon Age: Origins, however, the 2015 updated core rulebook "features material from Origins, Dragon Age 2, and Inquisition". The adventure Dragon Age RPG: The Dalish Curse (2016) was released by Green Ronin as a standalone free PDF; it was originally included in Dragon Age: Set 1 which went out of print. On April 9, 2019, Green Ronin released the supplement Faces of Thedas. This sourcebook is dedicated to porting series elements that could not fit in the core rulebook, such as a variety of companion and non-playable characters from the Dragon Age video games, into the table-top game.

BioWare also released two system-neutral lore books, Dragon Age: The World of Thedas Vol. 1 (2013) and Vol. 2 (2015), which included art by Green Ronin's Tyshan Carey. These were re-released in 2023 as a combined boxset. In 2024, Robin Valentine of PC Gamer noted that while "Green Ronin has ceased supporting the game, and it never really got a lot of releases in the first place", the publisher adapted the system's rules into their Fantasy Age game system. Valentine explained that since "Dragon Age features all sorts of classic fantasy tropes, it's easy to adapt Fantasy Age's many adventures, monsters, and more to it, and keep Thedas alive that way".

== Reception ==
The Dragon Age system was a perennial best-seller for Green Ronin – ICv2 highlighted that it was in the top five roleplaying games for multiple quarters, such as #4 in Q1 2010, Q4 2010, Q1 2011, Q2 2011, Q3 2011, Q4 2011, Q2 2012, Q3 2012, Q4 2015, and #5 in Q2 2016. In 2013, ICv2 also highlighted that Dragon Age received a 30% "TableTop Bump" in sales after being featured on the web series TableTop; ICv2 noted that "the Alliance Game Distributors sales increase is measured from a baseline three months before the original release of the TableTop episode, and compared to a recent rolling three month average".

Marshall Lemon, in his 2015 review written for The Escapist, praised the Dragon Age Core Rulebook, commenting "Green Ronin's Dragon Age isn't just a fantastic RPG adaptation, it's an excellent game period. It doesn't matter if you're a veteran tabletop player, a BioWare fan, or a complete newcomer to gaming. Dragon Age is a wonderful tabletop RPG that absolutely deserves your attention." Lemon thought the main downside of the new combined rulebook was its "massive" size at "over 400 pages" since "parsing the book for useful content will feel more daunting to new gamers" compared to the split between the three sets where "first-time players could focus entirely on rules for low-level characters until they were comfortable with advanced mechanics". Susana Polo of Polygon highlighted that while the game limits players to three class choices, the game still feels like there is a "multitude" of choice "with no less than 30 distinct Backgrounds for players to choose from" and that Green Ronin "shows its dedication to the vast world that Bioware has painted for its Dragon Age series" with the background options. Polo felt that players who like both the Dragon Age setting and tabletop role-playing games should "check the game out".

Robin Valentine of PC Gamer commented the game has "old school charm to its take on fantasy adventure, with some clever new ideas thrown in to make it feel fresh and exciting" and that it almost felt "a bit like old school D&D" due to its "simple class and levelling system and lots of classic adventuring, albeit with the dark fantasy atmosphere of Dragon Age past". While Polo thought the game mechanics were not more complex than Dungeons & Dragons 5th edition, she wasn't sure about recommending "it to a group that was completely new to tabletop RPGs, if only because of the source material. Dragon Age wouldn't feel like Dragon Age without mature handling of sex, addiction and dark ritual – challenging subjects that can turn a poorly managed game into an uncomfortable experience". Alex Lenzini of CBR thought the Dragon Age lore was "fairly welcoming to players" and "easy for players to jump into without knowing too much". He felt it was a "fantastic tabletop RPG" which made "it easy for new players to hop into the adventure".

Polo also highlighted that the game uses just three six-sided dice unlike other tabletop role-playing games and adds "flair" via the Stunt Point table which players gain access to if they roll doubles on any of their dice. Lenzini opined that the game's dice and stunt "system not only separates it from the countless other tabletop RPG dice systems but also excels at making players feel like awesome fantasy adventurers". Lenzini commented that one of the three dice, the Dragon Die, determines the strength of the stunt and it "creates a fun and engaging reward that happens more frequently than rolling a natural 20 does in D&D, and it has layers of effectiveness that keep things balanced and interesting". Valentine called the stunt mechanics "particularly good", highlighting that "every roll to hit in combat has a chance to generate points you can spend on getting cool extra effects". Lemon similarly commented that "the Dragon Die make the lowest of characters into an epic hero" and that "stunts keep players focused on the in-game action. In turn, dice rolls get a lot more exciting – and dangerous – when you realize NPCs might use stunts against you".

Lemon reviewed the Faces of Thedas sourcebook for VG247 in 2019. He noted that it is not an essential product for game masters working from the core book, though he recognized that fans of the Dragon Age video games will relish the "opportunity to interact with fan-favorite characters", and that "the relationship rules can encourage roleplay opportunities for new players".

=== Awards and nominations ===
Year	Award	Category	Work	Result	Ref.
2010	ENnie Awards	Best Game	Dragon Age: Set 1	Nominated	
2010	ENnie Awards	Product of the Year	Dragon Age: Set 1	Nominated	
2011	Origins Awards	Best Roleplaying Game	Dragon Age: Set 1	Nominated	
2012	Origins Awards	Best Roleplaying Supplement or Adventure	Dragon Age: Set 2	Nominated	
2012	ENnie Awards	Best Art, Interior	Dragon Age: Set 2	Silver Award	
2012	ENnie Awards	Best Free Product	Dragon Age Quickstart Guide	Nominated	
2016	ENnie Awards	Best Art, Interior	Dragon Age Core Rulebook	Gold Award	
2016	ENnie Awards	Best Game	Dragon Age Core Rulebook	Gold Award	
2016	ENnie Awards	Product of the Year	Dragon Age Core Rulebook	Nominated	

== Books and supplements ==
Year	Title	Type	Authors	ISBN	Ref.
2010	Dragon Age: Set 1	Rulebook (boxed set)	Chris Pramas	ISBN 978-1-934547-30-4	
2010	Dragon Age Game Master's Kit	Gamemaster's screen, adventure module	Jeff Tidball	—N/a	
2010	Dragon Age: Blood in Ferelden	Adventure module	Walt Ciechanowski, Kevin Kulp, TS Luikart	ISBN 978-1-934547-33-5	
2011	Dragon Age: Set 2	Rulebook (boxed set)	Steve Kenson, T.S. Luikart, Chris Pramas, Jeff Tidball	ISBN 978-1-934547-44-1	
2011	Dragon Age RPG Quickstart Guide	Supplement	Jeff Tidball	—N/a	
2013	Dragon Age: Duty Unto Death	Adventure module	Chris Pramas	—N/a	
2014	Dragon Age: Set 3	Rulebook (boxed set)	Chris Pramas, Will Hindmarch, Steve Kenson, Mary Kirby, Lauren Roy, Logan Bonner, Zack Walters	ISBN 978-1-934547-48-9	
2015	Dragon Age RPG Core Rulebook	Rulebook	Chris Pramas	ISBN 978-1934547625	
2016	Dragon Age Game Master's Kit, Revised	Gamemaster's screen, adventure module	Chris Pramas, Dave Brookshaw	ISBN 978-1-934547-69-4	
2016	Dragon Age RPG: The Dalish Curse	Adventure module	Steve Kenson, Evan Sass	—N/a	
2019	Faces of Thedas	Supplement	Lisa Adams, Stephen Michael Dipesa, Justin Harris, Alyc Helms, Jack Norris, Matt Miller, Oz Mills, Jack Norris, Ryan Schoon, Jamie Wood	ISBN 978-1934547830	
