= Pariah Press =

Game publisher

Pariah Press was the company, funded by Mike Nystul, that published the first commercial edition of The Whispering Vault role-playing game.

== History ==
Mike Nystul self-published a new horror role-playing game called The Whispering Vault (1993), which he debuted as a limited edition at GenCon 26, and founded Pariah Press the following year to release an expanded version of the game. In 2003, Ronin Arts purchased The Whispering Vault and started producing new Whispering Vault material almost immediately.
