= Green Ronin Publishing =

American publisher of role-playing games

- Predecessor: Ronin Publishing
- Founders: Chris Pramas and Nicole Lindroos
- Country of origin: United States
- Headquarters location: Seattle, Washington
- Distribution: Diamond Book Distributors
- Publication types: role-playing games
- Owners: Chris Pramas and Nicole Lindroos
- No. of employees: 12
- Official website: greenronin.com

Green Ronin Publishing is an American company based in Seattle, Washington. Founded in 2000 by Chris Pramas and Nicole Lindroos, they have published several role-playing game–related products. They won several awards for their games including multiple Origins, ENnie, Pen & Paper, and Inquest Fan Awards.

== History ==
In early 1996, Chris Pramas secured the rights to The Whispering Vault from Mike Nystul as he was leaving the game industry, and together with his brother Jason Pramas and their friend Neal Darcy, the three of them founded the company Ronin Publishing. This initial company published two role playing game supplements, The Book of Hunts (1997) for The Whispering Vault and Blood of the Valiant for Feng Shui. Ronin Publishing came to an end when Chris Pramas went to work for Wizards of the Coast in 1998.

Pramas founded Green Ronin Publishing with his wife Nicole Lindroos in 2000. The first publication from Green Ronin published was Ork! in July 2000. His association with Wizards of the Coast gave promise Pramas had inside information on the d20 license, so Green Ronin's first d20 publication Death in Freeport was released on August 10, 2000, on the same day as the D&D third edition Player's Handbook. Green Ronin moved beyond adventures for Freeport in 2001 and into publishing sourcebooks and other d20 material. Pramas was laid off from Wizards of the Coast in March 2002 so he went full-time with Green Ronin, doubling company production that year. The first new role-playing game published by Green Ronin was Spaceship Zero (2002); Toren Atkinson of the rock band The Darkest of the Hillside Thickets had some of his artwork published in Ork! and Death in Freeport and asked Pramas to publish a game based on the band's album Spaceship Zero Original Motion Picture Soundtrack (2000). The other role-playing game published by Green Ronin that year was Mutants & Masterminds (2002), created by Steve Kenson who Pramas had asked to design a new d20-based superhero game because of his previous freelance work on superhero role-playing games. In 2003, former Pinnacle Entertainment Group graphic designer, art director and Deadlands RPG brand manager Hal Mangold joined as partner, and the company formally established itself as an LLC. Mangold was Green Ronin's primary graphic designer and art director on a freelance basis since soon after the company's founding, doing the layout and design for the majority of the company's print output. (Ork!, laid out by Nicole Lindroos, and the Mutants & Masterminds game line, handled by the Super Unicorn design studio, were notable exceptions.)

On May 12, 2010, Green Ronin Publishing announced a third edition of the superhero role-playing game Mutants & Masterminds would debut in the fall. This announcement came just nine days after the publisher announced that it would debut a new DC Adventures game in August, based upon Mutants & Masterminds. According to Green Ronin President Chris Pramas, the two new games will "share a common ruleset."

In 2013, Green Ronin Publishing used crowdfunding platform Kickstarter to redesign and enlarge the Freeport campaign setting for the Pathfinder Roleplaying Game.

== Games and products ==
Green Ronin wrote the second edition of Warhammer Fantasy Roleplay, which was published by Black Industries. Other notable products include Freeport: The City of Adventure, "Green Ronin’s signature city setting" and "home to thousands of RPG campaigns since its launch in 2000", Thieves' World, and The Black Company d20 settings, Mutants & Masterminds, Blue Rose, and True20. Licensed products include the A Song of Ice and Fire Roleplaying game, the Dragon Age roleplaying game, and DC Adventures, a licensed roleplaying game based on the characters and setting found in DC Comics.

The Spirosblaak (2005) setting from Green Ronin's Mythic Vistas series was supported by Misfit Studios. They also created Fantasy AGE using the 'Adventure Game Engine' (source:)

== Reception ==
Green Ronin Publishing won the 2003 Silver Ennie Award for "Best Publisher", and again in 2004, and the Gold for "Best Publisher" and Silver for "Fan's Choice for Best Publisher" in 2005, and Gold for "Fan's Choice for Best Publisher" in 2006.

== See also ==
- Arcana: Societies of Magic
- The Shaman's Handbook
- The Witch's Handbook
- Ultramodern Firearms
- The Avatar's Handbook
- Bastards & Bloodlines: A Guidebook to Half-Breeds
- Monsters of the Mind
- The Psychic's Handbook
- Egyptian Adventures: Hamunaptra
