= Omlevex =

- Designers: Cynthia Celeste Miller
- Publishers: Z-Man Games and Spectrum Games
- Publication: 2003
- Genres: Superhero fiction
- Systems: Mutants & Masterminds, Hero System, Silver-Age Sentinels

Omlevex is a superhero role-playing game supplement published by Z-Man Games and Spectrum Games. The game mechanics are compatible with Champions, Silver Age Sentinels, and Mutants & Masterminds.

Omlevex is set on the fictional Atlantic islands of Metazon. The game presents itself as the proprietary universe of a Silver Age comic book publishing company, complete with fictional authors, first appearance dates, and full page issue covers.

Omlevex contained Hero System conversions.

== Heroes of Omlevex ==
The major heroes of the Omlevex universe consist of:

- Drake Einstein - An actor who became a superhero to get movie roles
- The American Gargoyle - A patriotic mutant who resembles a gargoyle
- Cliffhanger - A former spy turned superhero
- Lacie Delmont - A heroine who fights the supernatural
- Freedom's Trio - A superhero team that banded together to protect the universe

== The future of Omlevex ==
After the Z-Man Games book officially went out of print due to Z-Man Games retreating from the pen & paper RPG sector, the Omlevex setting and its characters lay dormant for several years.

In late 2009, a decision was made by Cynthia Celeste Miller of Spectrum Games to completely reboot and revise Omlevex as a separate superhero roleplaying game. Barak Blackburn was brought on board to write the rulebook. Omlevex as a standalone game will not use a fictional version of the 1960s as a default anymore, but rather the year 2010 as a starting point. The core rules are based loosely on the d12-based rules from Cartoon Action Hour: Season 2. The new game was playtested from late 2009 to the summer of 2010 by Blackburn and several volunteers.

On August 19, 2010, Spectrum Games issued a short Facebook message that said the new rules system was now going to be developed under the name Capes, Cowls and Villains Foul (CC&VF for short), actually using a much older working title for one of Cynthia Celeste Miller's earlier games. The message on Facebook also stated that "[t]he game will not be tied to a specific setting," but the new Omlevex was scheduled as a setting sourcebook for the forthcoming CC&VF system.

A public designer's blog for the CC&VF system was started by Blackburn soon after, on September 21, 2010. The same month, a free PDF quickstart version of the rules along with a short scenario and four ready-to-play characters was released under the name of CC&VF: Quickstart Preview.

As of the end of 2010, no mention of the Omlevex property or setting was made in any official source, but the plan is still to eventually release Omlevex as one of several optional settings for the game.

== Reviews ==
- Pyramid
