= Adventure! =

Tabletop role-playing game

- Designers: Andrew Bates, Bruce Baugh, Kraig Blackwelder, Ken Cliffe, Robert Hatch, Clayton A. Oliver, Richard Thomas, Fred Yelk
- Publishers: White Wolf Game Studio
- Publication: 2001
- Genres: Historical fiction, superhero fiction
- Systems: Storyteller System, d20 System (from 2004)

Adventure! is a pulp action role-playing game originally printed by White Wolf Game Studio, the third and last book in the Trinity Universe line of games. The game, printed in black and white on pulp-like sepia paper to resemble a period piece, was conceived as a one-book game line, and was never supported by official supplements. Despite having a vocal fanbase, the Trinity Universe line was discontinued shortly after the game's publication; a d20 system version was released in 2004, but quickly discontinued. In 2002, Adventure! won the Origins Award for Best Role-Playing Game of 2001. Onyx Path Publishing has recently acquired the rights to the Trinity Universe and has announced its intention to release a new edition of Adventure!

== Setting ==
The game is set in the 1920s and therefore at the origin of the Trinity Universe timeline. The release of unknown Telluric energy has led to the appearance of a number of particularly gifted characters, whose actions have the potential for shaping the future history of the world. The Aeon Society for Gentlemen, founded by philanthropist Maxwell Mercer, is trying to bring together as many "Inspired" characters as possible, supporting and coordinating them in their effort for the betterment of all of humanity. But darkness lurks, and Mercer's champions will have to face it in the most unlikely locales. There are three archetypes ("character classes") for players to choose from:

- Daredevils - whose only "powers" revolve around luck and incredible skill.
- Mesmerists - the precursors to Trinity's Psions, masters of the powers of the mind.
- Stalwarts - the precursors of Aberrant's Novas, capable of superhuman feats.

== Game system ==
Set to emulate the exploits of Saturday matinee serials and pulp magazine action, Adventure! uses a very loose and flexible variant of the White Wolf proprietary Storyteller System. Adventure! adds significantly to the Storyteller System in three areas: Knacks, Inspiration and Super-Science.

=== Knacks ===
Knacks are powers that differentiate adventurers and villains from normal human beings.

- Heroic powers enhance a human's natural ability, but don’t appear supernatural. Examples include Lightning Reflexes, Amazing Resilience or Eagle Eyes.
- Psychic powers manipulate the mind and include telekinesis, telepathy and mind control.
- Dynamic powers are more obvious superhero style powers including flight, exceptional strength and supernatural toughness.

=== Inspiration ===
Inspiration is used to activate knacks, alter the story significantly (either as an instantaneous feat or by altering a potential cliffhanger to better suit the player) increase the number of dice you roll for an action or gain intuitive knowledge to move the story along. There are three facets, and associated traits, to Inspiration, each with their own advantages:

- Intuitive – Quicker reactions and better mental agility.
- Reflective – Increased patience and bonuses to extended actions.
- Destructive – Additional damage and concept damage.

== Reviews ==
- Pyramid
- Black Gate #4
- Backstab #48
- Backstab #34
- Realms of Fantasy

== See also ==
- Aberrant
- Trinity
- World of Darkness
- Crimefighters
