= Grave Robber (disambiguation) =

Grave robbery is the act of uncovering a grave, tomb or crypt to steal commodities.

Grave Robber may refer to:

- Grave Robber (band), American horror punk band
- Graverobbers (film), 1988 American film
- Grave Robbers (film), 1989 Mexican film
- "Grave Robber" (song), a 2023 song by Crowder

== See also ==
- Grave Robbers from Outer Space, a card game
