= Spectrum Games =

Role-playing game publisher

Spectrum Games is the trading name of a small company that designs role-playing games (RPGs).

It was founded in 2000 (as Spectrum Game Studios, which is still the company's legal name) by Cynthia Celeste Miller and Sabrina Belle (the latter of whom is no longer involved). In 2002, Eddy Webb was brought into the fold and soon became vice-president. Two of the products created by the company have been nominated for the Indie Game Awards, Origins Awards, and the ENnie Awards.

Products
| Product | Description |
|---|---|
| Cartoon Action Hour | CAH is an RPG that emulates the adventure cartoons of the 1980s, along the lines of Thundarr the Barbarian, Transformers, Thundercats, Masters of the Universe, G.I. Joe, M.A.S.K., Visionaries, Bravestarr, Silverhawks, etc. This is easily the company's most well-known product and has spawned a handful of supplement books. The game enjoys a small but rabid fan base. |
| Omlevex | Omlevex is a Silver Age superhero setting for use with three different RPGs (Mutants & Masterminds, Champions, and Silver Age Sentinels). It takes the unusual approach of pretending that the fictitious Omlevex Comics Group actually existed, even going so far as including "real life" info about the writers, artists, and other creators supposedly responsible. Omlevex includes art from quite a few notable comicbook artists including Dick Ayers, Herb Trimpe, Mike Zeck, Joe Rubinstein, Roy Richardson, and June Brigman. |
| Tomorrow Knights | Based on the Epic cyberpunk comic series by Roy Richardson and Rod Whigham, this RPG is also compatible with Mutants & Masterminds. |
| Midway City | Billed as a "tech-noir" RPG that combines Dick Tracy, film noir, and cyberpunk into an interesting futuristic (yet 1930s-esque) setting, Midway City was released in late 2005. |
| Endgame | Endgame is Spectrum's first foray into miniatures games. It's a post-apocalyptic setting with a system that has been completely rewritten to make it entirely card-based. |
