= Gheos =

- Designers: René Wiersma
- Publishers: Z-Man Games
- Players: 2-4
- Setup time: Approx. 5 min.
- Playing time: Approx. 45 min.
- Chance: tile drawing
- Age range: 10+
- Skills: tile laying

Gheos is a tile-laying board game designed by René Wiersma. Graphic design and illustration was supplied by Joshua Cappel, and box cover art was painted by Allan Bednar. The game was published in 2006 by Z-Man Games.

== Gameplay ==
In Gheos the players assume the role of gods who shape the earth and populate it with people. By playing triangular cardboard tiles, which depict various configurations of water and land, players form seas and continents. These continents may become inhabited by civilizations. Players try to gain followers in these civilizations, and by using one of their three scoring tokens at opportune moments players score points, the score depending on the various symbols depicted on the continents as well as on the number of followers per civilization. Placing tiles may result in civilizations migrating to a different continent, or it may start a war between different civilizations.

After a number of Epoch tiles have been drawn the game ends and, after a final scoring round, the player with the most points is declared the winner.

== History ==
Before being published an early prototype of the game won a board game contest hosted by the Board Game Designers' Forum. The Gheos prototype also reached the final round of the Hippodice boardgame contest in 2005. The published version of the game received a Mensa Select Award in 2007.

== Reviews ==
- Pyramid
