= SEAL Team Flix =

2018 board game

SEAL Team Flix is a cooperative or solo tactical dexterity board game designed by Pete Ruth and Mark Thomas and published by WizKids in 2018. Players control a team of Navy SEALs on missions against an eco-terrorist organization, combining grid-based tactical movement, disc-flicking combat, destroyable terrain, and an automated enemy AI system.

== Gameplay ==
SEAL Team Flix is an objective-based game for one to four players. Players control SEAL operators who move on a grid across modular maps with 3D walls, using cover, equipment, and positioning. Combat and many skill checks are resolved by flicking wooden discs rather than dice. Terrain is destructible; walls, cover, and other elements can be damaged or destroyed during play, altering lines of sight and movement options. Enemy forces are controlled by an automated AI system that responds to player actions, noise, and line of sight. Additional sideboards handle specialized actions such as sniping, bomb defusal, and lock picking under time pressure. The game includes a branching eight-mission campaign as well as standalone skirmish missions. Difficulty scales with the number of operators and optional difficulty levels.

== Development ==
According to the designers, the game originated from a request by Zev Shlasinger for a tabletop experience that captured elements of first-person shooter video games. Early versions used more conventional combat resolution; the final design shifted to disc-flicking after the designers determined that a skill-based mechanic better matched the intended “twitch” feel. The title was developed over several years and published by WizKids.

== Reception ==
Critics highlighted the combination of tactical dungeon-crawl elements with dexterity mechanics. Daniel Thurot of Space-Biff! described SEAL Team Flix as “a rare beast, a chimera of genres that manages to be both tactical and tactile,” calling it “the slickest tactical shooter corridor-crawling dexterity game I’ve ever played.” Charlie Theel, writing for Nerdist, noted that the game “wildly blends first-person shooters and flicking discs” and called the design novel and addictive. Tony Mastrangeli of Board Game Quest called it “a brilliant mashup of a tactical shooter game and a dexterity game,” praising the inventive gameplay and sideboard mini-games. TechRaptor observed that the disc-flicking was implemented in a thematic way that set the game apart in the crowded dungeon-crawl market rather than feeling gimmicky. The podcast So Very Wrong About Games referred to the game as “The Only Game that Matters.”

Other coverage included reviews on There Will Be Games that described the design as innovative for modeling tense personal combat through a physical mechanic, and a short feature in Tabletop Gaming magazine. Industry sites such as ICv2 and the WizKids website covered the game’s announcement and release as a dexterity-based tactical title.

The game received nominations at the 2018 Board Game Quest Awards in the categories of Most Innovative, Best Thematic, and Best Tactical/Combat.

== Awards and nominations ==
- 2018 Board Game Quest Awards – Most Innovative (nominated)
- 2018 Board Game Quest Awards – Best Thematic (nominated)
- 2018 Board Game Quest Awards – Best Tactical/Combat (nominated)
