= Nexus: The Infinite City =

Role-playing game supplement

- Designers: Jose Garcia
- Publishers: Daedalus Games
- Publication: 1994
- Genres: Trans-dimensional
- Systems: Custom

Nexus: the Infinite City is a role-playing game published by Canadian (later American) publisher Daedalus Games in 1994 that is set in a meta-city made up of chunks of various realities of the megaverse.

== Description ==
Nexus: The Infinite City takes place in a city called Nexus. Player characters can fill many roles within the city, from violent enforcers to capitalistic thirds. Critic Chloé Russel noted "Roman centurions rub shoulders with magician elves, Aztec priests or cyberpunk ninjas." The city itself is a conglomerate of other cities from many worlds and dimensions. Each chunk of reality follows its own natural laws of physics, so technology works in some realities, while magic is usable in other realities.

The primary core of Nexus play is Angel City, a large part of Los Angeles separated from Earth in 1993, wholly subsumed into Nexus and subsequently carved up by numerous factions and powers.

== System ==
Nexus' system is the precursor to Feng Shui, a game later written by Robin Laws. Character attributes are split between three categories: Body, Mind, and Reflexes. Skills add to a character's capability in a category. Powers are broadly defined and allow for characters to have diverse power styles; the game includes three such systems, Nexan Sorcery, Rhyming Magic, and Psychic Powers. A list of modifiers and sample spells allows players to create more powers and frameworks.

Actions are resolved by rolling two six-sided dice. One die gives a positive number and the other a negative. The character's level and relevant skill or power are added to the dice roll, and the sum is compared to a target number.

== Publication history ==
In the early 1990s, while Jose Garcia was working in a video store in Toronto, he decided to start a games company. He talked to Peter Adkison and John Nephew about the games market, and attended the GAMA trade show to learn more. With his sister Maria, Garcia then set up Daedelus Games. Its first product was Nexus: The Infinite City, designed by Garcia, with contributions by Bruce Baugh, Ian Brennan, Rob Heinsoo, Douglas Hulick, Robin Laws, and Tim Toner. Artwork was by Kevin Davies, Jose Garcia, Eric Hotz, Dave MacKay, Craig Maher, Yan Rozentsveig, Dan Smith, Nick Smith, Eric Tobiason and Karl Waller.

== Reception ==
In Issue 68 of the French games magazine Casus Belli, Chloé Russel commented, "Did we really need such a phenomenon in an already fairly crowded market? Definitely: yes! As surprising as it may seem, Nexus, with the appearance of a rickety Spanish inn, is a perfect success of the genre, proof that it is possible to do something good with anything!" Russle was excited by the book, writing, "The theme, as we have seen, is contained in three lines, but it is treated in such an intelligent way that one is constantly tempted to interrupt reading to throw a host of jumbled ideas onto paper in turn." Russel concluded, "fans of à la carte systems where everything (rules, background, way of playing) is almost all left to the discretion of the gamemaster may have just found their Eden."
