= Z-Man Games =

Board game company

- Type: Subsidiary
- Industry: Board games; Card games
- Founded: 1999; 27 years ago
- Founder: Zev Shlasinger
- Headquarters: Roseville, Minnesota, United States
- Parent: F2Z Entertainment (2011–2016); Asmodee (2016–present)
- Website: zmangames.com

Z-Man Games is an American board game company, incorporated in 1999. It was named after its founder, Zev Shlasinger. The company is known for their Pandemic series of board games, as well as being the sole publisher for the English editions of popular Eurogames, such as Carcassonne and Terra Mystica.

== History ==
Z-Man Games was primarily formed to bring the collectible card game Shadowfist back into publication.

In 2011, Sophie Gravel, owner of Quebec-based publisher/distributor Filosofia, bought Z-Man Games, creating F2Z Entertainment. Shlasinger left Z-Man Games in January 2016. In 2016, F2Z Entertainment was acquired by Asmodee.

== Published games ==
- A B-movie card game series consisting of games such as Grave Robbers From Outer Space and Cannibal Pygmies in the Jungle of Doom
- 1960: The Making of the President, an original creation by Z-Man Games
- Agricola
- Archaeology: The Card Game, a market-style card game
- Arimaa, an abstract strategy game
- Ascending Empires, a space based empire expansion game
- Carcassonne, Z-Man Games has published the English version of this game in the US and Canada since 2012
- Endeavor, a complex strategy game edited by Z-Man Games in 2009
- Gheos, a game where players take on the role of deities
- Neuroshima Hex!
- Omlevex, a role-playing supplement for Mutants & Masterminds, Champions, and Silver Age Sentinels
- Onirim, and the Oniverse series of short single-player games: Sylvion, Castellion, Nautilion, and Aerion
- Pandemic, a cooperative board game
- Saboteur, a mining path card game
- Shadow Hunters
- Shadowfist
- Start Player by Ted Alspach, a card game to determine who goes first in the following game
- Terra Mystica, by Jens Drögemüller and Helge Ostertag, winner of the 2013 International Gamers Award - General Strategy: Multi-player Winner
- Ursuppe
- The Walking Dead, a 2009 board games based on the comic of the same name
- The Walking Dead: The Prison, "both a stand-alone game and an expansion module to the first game", funded through Kickstarter

== See also ==
- Going Cardboard – a documentary about board games in which Shlasinger is interviewed
