= Marked for Death (Feng Shui) =

Role-playing game adventure

Marked for Death is a 1996 role-playing game adventure published by Daedalus Entertainment for Feng Shui.

== Plot summary ==
Marked for Death is an adventure in which five cinematic adventures are offered with a fusion of action, mysticism, and pulp storytelling. These scenarios range in complexity and are framed with script-style introductions that set the tone for each tale. Mirroring the structure of "Baptism of Fire", each adventure unfolds across familiar sections—Premise, Twist, Climax—followed by narrative backstory, character notes, and scene-by-scene breakdowns. The adventures themselves range from the fast-paced heist of "Brinks!" to supernatural chaos in "Blood for the Master". "Pai Lai" stretches into time travel with narrative entanglement, while "The Shape of Guilt" offers a campaign arc centered on Netherworld intrigues and long-buried secrets. The final story, "Shaolin Fleartbreak", is a tale full of sorcery, mistaken identity, and environmental catastrophe. Gamemasters can slot these adventures into existing campaigns, and they fit with the Secret War backdrop.

== Reception ==
Andy Butcher reviewed Marked for Death for Arcane magazine, rating it an 8 out of 10 overall, and stated that "this is a great collection of well-designed, action-packed adventures for a very well-designed, action-packed game. Recommended."

== Reviews ==
- Shadis #28 (1996)
- Rollespilsmagasinet Fønix (Issue 15 - February 1997)
