= Andrew Bates (game designer) =

Game designer and illustrator

Charles Andrew Bates is a game designer, illustrator, and author.

== Career ==
The American game publisher White Wolf had a hole in their 1997 publishing schedule, so CEO Steve Wieck asked designer Andrew Bates to come up with new a role-playing game. Bates was able to bring the science fiction game Æon from idea to publication in only ten months. The game later became known as Trinity, with Bates serving as both designer and illustrator. Trinity was the first part of a "thematic trilogy" of games, followed by Aberrant (1999) by Justin Achilli and Bates, and Adventure! (2001) by Bates and Bruce Baugh.

The first three novels written by Bates comprise the Year of the Scarab Trilogy of World of Darkness and consist of Heralds of the Storms, Lay Down with Lions, and Land of the Dead. Don Bassingthwaite has commented that they were "Well done! The action is suitably intense and the plotting is brisk. Slotting the world-views of the different monstrous factions of the World of Darkness together is no easy task, nor is smoothing over the game jargon, but Bates has done a good job of both. The few rough edges that do remain — frequently repeated information, jarring bits of dialogue, extraneous details and actions, and the odd plot line that ends up going nowhere — are distracting but not detrimental to a good story. ... If the Year of the Scarab Trilogy is anything to judge by, you may want to keep an eye on Andrew Bates."

=== Name ===
Bates went by his middle name, Andrew, early in his career. He has since reverted to his first name, Charlie, with "Charles Andrew Bates" used for professional credits.
