= Jose Garcia (game designer) =

Canadian role-playing game designer

- Occupation: Game designer

Jose Garcia is a game designer who has worked primarily on role-playing games.

== Career ==
Jose Garcia started Daedalus Games in 1993 when Robin Laws came to him with an idea for a role-playing game based on Hong Kong Action Cinema films; Garcia liked the idea, but his first priority was own RPG Nexus: The Infinite City, so Daedalus published Nexus in 1994 with Garcia as the main designer and developer, with additional authors including Laws, Bruce Baugh, and Rob Heinsoo. Garcia was also interested in promoting the setting that Laws was developing, which was first used for a collectible card game Daedalus published as Shadowfist (1995), and subsequently in Laws' Feng Shui RPG. When the CCG market crashed in 1997, the staff of Daedalus were either laid off or quit, leaving Jose Garcia and his sister Maria as the only people remaining with the company. A few years later the company entered bankruptcy protection and sold off its intellectual properties, after which Garcia moved to Europe and left the gaming industry.
