= Rob Heinsoo =

American game designer (born 1964)

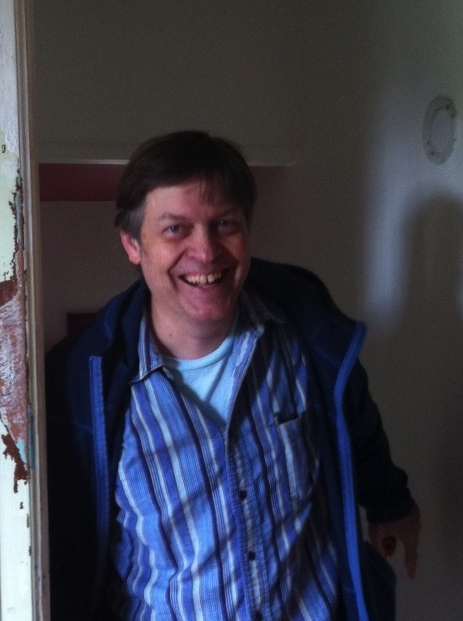
- Born: 1964 (age 61–62)
- Occupation: Game designer
- Writing career
- Genre: Role-playing games

Rob Heinsoo (born 1964) is an American tabletop game designer. He has designed and contributed to professional role-playing games, card games, board games and miniatures since 1994. Heinsoo was the lead designer on the 4th Edition of Dungeons & Dragons (2008), and is co-designer of the 13th Age roleplaying game along with Jonathan Tweet.

== Early life ==
Heinsoo began playing Dungeons & Dragons in 1974 at age 10, using the original edition. His interest in games informed his interest in science fiction and fantasy, and vice versa.

== Career ==
Heinsoo was hired by Jose Garcia for Daedalus Games to work on the role-playing game Nexus; some of his work for Daedalus Games' Feng Shui RPG was later published by Atlas Games. Chaosium hired Heinsoo in 1996 to oversee their licenses for Glorantha, but he was laid off the following year.

Heinsoo joined Wizards of the Coast (WotC) as part of the "D&D Worlds" team, where he focused on the third-edition version of Forgotten Realms. With WotC, Heinsoo was involved with a number of Dungeons & Dragons game products. Other Forgotten Realms works include the sourcebook Monsters of Faerûn. He also helped write the third edition Forgotten Realms Campaign Setting, which reached the top 50 of the non-fiction bestsellers in Canada in 2002 and won an Origins Award for "Best roleplaying supplement of 2001". He is the designer of the card game Three-Dragon Ante.

While at Wizards of the Coast, he also led and contributed to various miniatures gaming projects. Heinsoo playtested the Chainmail game and became a member of the Chainmail team, where he contributed to the Chainmail column in Dragon magazine writing about tactics and rules. Subsequent to the release of the Dungeons & Dragons Miniatures Game, he took over as lead designer. He was also one of three designers for Dreamblade, for which he was nominated for an Origins Award in 2007.

Early in 2005, Wizards' Director of R&D for Dungeons and Dragons Bill Slavicsek organized a team to begin some early designs for a fourth edition of the game, which was headed up by Heinsoo and included Andy Collins and James Wyatt. Heinsoo led the teams working on the design and development in 2005 and 2006. The fourth edition Player's Handbook became nominated for an Origins Award for "Best Roleplaying Game" in 2009. His teammates referred to his role on the Fourth Edition team as the "mad genius". His book, Monster Manual 2, co-written with Chris Sims, was a Wall Street Journal bestseller in 2009. That year, Heinsoo was laid off by Wizards.

After Wizards, Heinsoo designed the 13th Age RPG with Jonathan Tweet, the lead designer of the third edition D&D. Heinsoo and Tweet are close friends who have played tabletop games together for years.

Heinsoo also contributes to the RPG publication Alarums and Excursions.

== Tabletop roleplaying games ==
- Nexus: The Infinite City (1994) (Lead Editor, Writer)
- Back for Seconds (1996) (Co-Editor)
- Marked for Death (1996) (Co-Editor)
- Feng Shui: Hong Kong Action Movie Roleplay (1996) (Co-Editor)

=== 3rd Edition D&D ===
- Monsters of Faerun (2000) (Co-Designer)
- Forgotten Realms Campaign Setting (2001) (Co-Author)

=== 4th Edition D&D ===
- Dungeons and Dragons 4th Edition (2008) (Lead Designer)
- Player's Handbook (2008) (Lead Designer)
- D&D Essentials: Rules Compendium (2010) (Lead Designer)
- The Plane Above (2010) (Lead Designer)
- Underdark (2010) (Lead Designer)
- Primal Power (2009) (Designer)
- Adventurer's Vault 2 (2009) (Lead Designer)
- Monster Manual 2 (2009) (Lead Designer)
- Divine Power (2009) (Lead Designer)
- Forgotten Realms Player's Guide (2008) (Lead Designer)
- Martial Power (2008) (Lead Designer)

=== 13th Age ===
- 13th Age
- 13 True Ways
- 13th Age Bestiary
- 13th Age Monthly
- 13th Age in Glorantha

== Card games and board games ==
- Surviving On the Edge players' guide (1995) (Co-Author)
- Shadowfist trading card game (1995) (Lead Playtester, Editor)
  - Netherworld (1996) (Developer, Additional Design)
  - Shadowfist Player's Guide (1996) (Author)
  - Flashpoint (1997) (Co-designer, Art Direction)
- Legend of the Five Rings Gold Edition (2000) (Story Lead)
- Football Champions trading card game (2001–2004) (Designer, seven sets)
- Three-Dragon Ante card game (2005) (Designer)
- Inn-Fighting (2007) dice game (Designer)
- Castle Ravenloft (2010) (Additional Design)
- Three-Dragon Ante: Emperor's Gambit (2010) (Designer)
- Epic Spell Wars of the Battle Wizards: Duel at Mount Skullzfyre card game (2012) (Game Design)
- Night Eternal (2013) card game based on True Blood (Game Design)
- Shadowrun Crossfire (2014)
- Shadowrun Crossfire: High Caliber Ops (2015)
- Epic Spell Wars 2: Rumble at Castle Tentakil (2015)
- Legendary: Big Trouble in Little China (2016)
- Three-Dragon Ante: Legendary Edition (2019) (Designer)
- Wrestlenomicon (2020) (Co-Designer)

== Miniatures games ==
- Chainmail (2002) (Co-Designer with Jonathan Tweet)
  - Sets 1-4 (2002–2003) (Co-Designer, Developer with Jonathan Tweet)
- D&D Miniatures Sets 1–9, Harbinger, Dragoneye, Archfiends, Giants of Legend, Aberrations, Deathknell, Angelfire, Underdark, Wardrums (2003–2006) (Designer)
- Dungeons & Dragons Miniatures (2003) (Lead Designer)
- Dreamblade (2006) (Co-designer with Jonathan Tweet)

== Computer games ==
- King of Dragon Pass (1999) (Lead Q&A, Additional Design, Manual)
