= Blood of the Valiant =

Role-playing game supplement

Blood of the Valiant is a 1998 role-playing game supplement for Feng Shui published by Ronin Publishing.

== Contents ==
Blood of the Valiant is a sourcebook presenting information on the Guiding Hand faction, including its history, as well as its philosophy, and the way it is organized.

== Publication history ==
Chris Pramas had written Blood of the Valiant for Daedalus Entertainment, but the company never published it or even sent him a contract due to their own financial difficulties, but the supplement was later licensed to Ronin Publishing who were able to publish it in 1998 as their second and final book.

== Reception ==
The reviewer from the online second volume of Pyramid stated that "this book expands upon the Guiding Hand, one of a number of time-traveling cabals seeking to control the world through the mystical powers of oriental Feng Shui. This Guiding Hand sourcebook is well thought out and very useful, but not without a few very minor flaws."

== Reviews ==
- Shadis #52 (Oct., 1998)
- Dragon #251
- Realms of Fantasy
