= Aberrant Worldwide Phase II =

Role-playing game supplement

Aberrant Worldwide Phase I is a 2000 role-playing game supplement for Aberrant published by White Wolf Publishing.

== Contents ==
Aberrant Worldwide Phase I is a supplement that functions as a guide to the setting and an adventure book to advance the metaplot, and updates the time frame in which the world is set.

== Reception ==
Aberrant Worldwide Phase I was reviewed in the online second version of Pyramid which said "The adventure design allows a GM to involve PCs from the most loyal Utopian to the most radical Terat to take roughly the same course through the adventure (and to desire roughly the same outcome), maximizing utility to all gaming groups while keeping the complexity from being unwieldy. For better or worse, this generally means that Aberrant Worldwide Phase II drags the setting even further into the realm of conspiracy gaming."

== Reviews ==
- Backstab #24
