= Clanbook: Lasombra =

1996 tabletop role-playing game supplement

- First edition cover art by Tim Bradstreet and Grant Goleash
- Designers: Robert Hatch (ed. 1); Justin Achilli (ed. 2)
- Writers: Richard Dansky (ed. 1); Elizabeth Ditchburn (ed. 1); Bruce Baugh (ed. 2)
- Publishers: White Wolf Publishing
- Publication: June 1996 (ed. 1); 2001 (ed. 2)
- Genres: Tabletop role-playing game supplement
- Systems: Storyteller System
- Parent games: Vampire: The Masquerade
- Series: World of Darkness
- ISBN: 1-56504-211-5 (ed. 1): 1-58846-201-3 (ed. 2)

Clanbook: Lasombra is a tabletop role-playing game supplement originally published by White Wolf Publishing in June 1996 for use with their game Vampire: The Masquerade, and released in an updated version in 2001.

== Contents ==
Clanbook: Lasombra is a sourcebook allows a player to roleplay as a vampire of the clan Lasombra, and its information is presented using a narrative style.

== Production ==
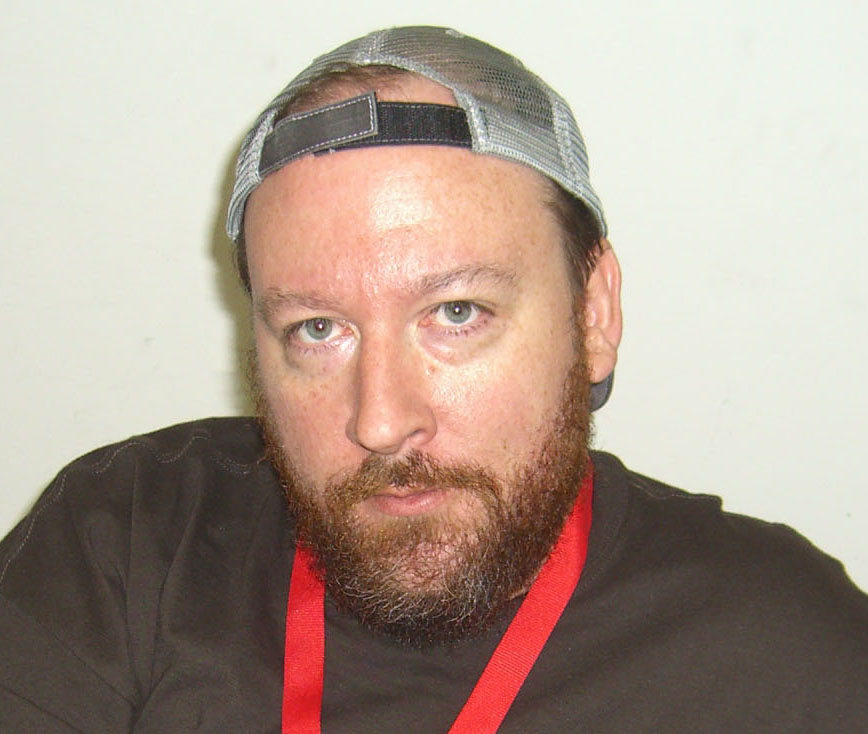
Tim Bradstreet (pictured) and Grant Goleash created the first edition's cover art.

Clanbook: Lasombra was originally developed by Robert Hatch, and written by Richard Dansky and Elizabeth Ditchburn, with art direction by Lawrence Snelly and Aileen E. Miles. The art team also included cover artists Tim Bradstreet, Grant Goleash, and Matt Milberger, and interior artists Pia Guerra, Jason Felix, Fred Hooper, Leif Jones, and Joshua Gabriel Timbrook. The second edition was developed by Justin Achilli and written by Bruce Baugh; its art team included art director Rich Thomas, cover artist John Van Fleet, and interior artists Michael Gaydos, Jones, Andrew Trabbold, Drew Tucker, and Christopher Shy.

White Wolf Publishing originally released Clanbook: Lasombra in June 1996, as a 72-page softcover book, and followed it with the 102-page second edition in 2001. Both editions have since been re-released as ebooks. The second edition was released in French by Hexagonal in 2001.

== Reception ==
Reception
Review scores
Source	Rating
Arcane	8/10 (ed. 1)

Martin Klimes of Arcane comments that "this book is an unequivocal success, and if you have any inclination to play a half-crazed, shadowy Sabbat schemer from Marrakesh or Madrid then you are unlikely to regret spending your money on it. Even accepting the proviso above, referees too can benefit greatly from its contents."

== Reviews ==
- Envoyer #26
- Backstab #27'
