= Zev Shlasinger =

Game designer and publisher

- Occupation: Game designer

Zev Shlasinger is a scriptwriter, game designer and game publisher. He is primarily known for founding Z-Man Games, which became the publisher of the Pandemic series of board games, as well as being the sole publisher for the English editions of popular Eurogames, such as Carcassonne and Terra Mystica.

== Early life ==
Zev Shlasinger became interested in board games and board wargames while in school.

== Screenwriter ==
After school, Shlasinger turned to screenwriting, creating the script for Flesh-Eating Mothers, a horror movie in which a virus turns suburban housewives into cannibals. Critics generally panned the movie and the script with comments like "amateurish", "knowingly bad script", and "So woodenly acted and scripted that gore scenes are laughable rather than frightening."

In 1994, Shlasinger wrote the script for the murder mystery movie Playback.

== Board games ==
In 2000, Shlasinger founded Z-Man Games, primarily to republish the discontinued collectible card game (CCG) Shadowfist. From there, Shlasinger's company published other CCGs such as WWF Raw Deal, and became the English-language licensee of several popular Eurogames.

Z-Man Games became the publisher of the Pandemic series of games in 2008, which subsequently won the 2009 Golden Geek Best Family Board Game, as well as being a finalist for the 2009 Spiel des Jahres.

In 2009, Shlasinger was the Special Guest at UK Games Expo in Birmingham.

In 2011, Sophie Gravel, owner of Quebec-based publisher/distributor Filosofia, bought Z-Man Games, and Shlasinger left in 2016, to join WizKids as Head of Board Game Operations.

In 2023, he founded Play to Z Games after leaving WizKids.
