= Time of Crisis =

Time of Crisis is a 2003 role-playing game adventure published by Green Ronin Publishing for Mutants & Masterminds.

== Plot summary ==
Time of Crisis is an adventure in which the player characters must thwart Omega's plan to annihilate four parallel Earths, stepping in while other major teams are occupied to save the entire omniverse.

== Reviews ==
- Pyramid
- Fictional Reality #12
- Legions Realm Monthly (Issue 11 - Jul 2003)
