= Darkness Revealed 2: Passage Through Shadow =

Role-playing game adventure

Darkness Revealed 2: Passage Through Shadow is a 1998 role-playing game adventure published by White Wolf Publishing for Trinity.

== Plot summary ==
Darkness Revealed 2: Passage Through Shadow is an adventure in which the player characters must expose a conspiracy.

== Reviews ==
- Backstab #11
- InQuest Gamer
