= Shattered Europe =

1998 role-playing game supplement

Shattered Europe is a 1998 role-playing game supplement published by White Wolf Publishing for Trinity.

== Contents ==
Shattered Europe is a supplement in which surviving Europeans try to rebuild decades after a massive crash that demolished most of the continent.

== Reviews ==
- SF Site
- Backstab #14
