= Trinity (role-playing game) =

Tabletop science fiction role-playing game

Trinity Continuum: Æon
- Designers: Andrew Bates, Ken Cliffe, Richard Dansky, Greg Fountain, Robert Hatch, Chris McDonough, Richard Thomas, Stephan Wieck, Fred Yelk
- Publishers: White Wolf Game Studio; Onyx Path Publishing
- Publication: 1997 (1st edition); 2004 (d20 edition); 2019 (Trinity Continuum edition)
- Genres: Futuristic, Superhero
- Systems: Storyteller System (1st edition) d20 System (d20 edition); Storypath System

Trinity Continuum: Æon is a science fiction role-playing game previously published by White Wolf Game Studio in 1997 (and later by the ArtHaus imprint) under the name Trinity. The current game is owned and published by Onyx Path Publishing.

== History ==
White Wolf had a hole in their 1997 publishing schedule, so CEO Steve Wieck asked designer Andrew Bates to come up with a new role-playing game, and Bates was able to bring science-fiction game ÆON (1997) from idea to publication in only 10 months. ÆON was intended to start an entirely new trilogy of games, and while its game rules were a variant of the Storytelling System, ÆON was meant to appeal to more action-oriented players than the World of Darkness. ÆON ran into problems early in its development when Viacom filed a lawsuit alleging a violation of their trademark for the Aeon Flux television series; White Wolf stickered over the names on the first printing of ÆON with the new name of the game, Trinity. With the success White Wolf was having with its ArtHaus imprint, low-settling games with high acclaim were increasingly added to ArtHaus, which brought Trinity to the imprint in 2000. ArtHaus produced d20 Trinity books to see how it would sell before trying d20 with the other White Wolf game universes, but Trinity d20 (2004) did not perform well in a weakened d20 market.

Five years after White Wolf's acquisition by CCP Games, CCP decided to shut down their traditional publishing endeavors. White Wolf's Creative Director, Richard Thomas, founded Onyx Path Publishing in 2012, and acquired the Trinity Universe, Scarred Lands, and Scion. After several years of publishing licensed material for White Wolf's World of Darkness and Exalted settings, the company was deemed stable enough to create a new system (the Storypath System) and new editions of both Scion and the now-renamed Trinity Continuum.

== Description ==
Trinity was the first installment in the Trinity Universe series of games (the two others being Aberrant and Adventure!) sharing a common background and developing an alternate history of humanity through two centuries, and allowing players to play almost all genres of science fiction - from comic-book superhero action to cutting edge technothriller, space opera, and old-fashioned pulp standards. Though it had a vocal fanbase the whole game line was discontinued due to low sales in 2001; an adaptation for the d20 system was released in 2004. Onyx Path Publishing acquired the rights to the Trinity Universe in 2012, and released a new edition. The basic rules used for the Trinity Continuum were released in the Trinity Continuum Core Rulebook, while the futuristic science-fiction setting was released as an expansion under the name Trinity Continuum: Æon in 2019.

== Setting ==
Set in the 22nd century, Trinity Continuum: Æon portrays a future Earth slowly recovering from a disastrous war (the origins of which are covered in Aberrant) and expanding in space. Former depressed areas such as Africa, South America and Eastern Asia, which suffered moderate traumas during the Aberrant War are now the leading political forces in the international arena, while Europe is a landscape of ruins and hard struggling survivors, and North America is under a fascist regime (the Federated States of America, or FSA). Bio-engineering is the leading technology and psionics are known and studied if not exactly widespread. Alien contact has been made, with mixed results. Characters take the roles of psionic individuals, working for one of the many organizations in the gaming world, and tackling troubles when they arise. The game setting, which is detailed in a number of supplements, allows for a variety of styles, from cyberpunk-like corporate espionage to Mad Max-style post-holocaust frontier adventure, to space exploration.

=== Orders ===
Players have a choice of six "Orders" for their characters to join. Each Order possesses a mastery over a specific "Aptitude", a category of psionic powers. Each Order is based in a specific geographic location, often the homeland of its founder, and is heavily influenced by local culture. Actually, there are eight "Orders" in the Trinity Universe, but one only became playable after some metaplot hooks made it so, and the other has almost been exterminated by the year where the playable timeline begins.

The Æsculapian Order
Based in Europe, this Order is a global medical clinic first and foremost; its members fulfill the roles of combat medics, healers and scientists. They teach the Aptitude of vitakinesis, the usage of the mind to heal the body.

Interplanetary School for Research and Advancement
Based on the Moon, this Order is a quasi-monastic school of philosophy associated with the real-world religion the Baháʼí Faith (see popular media references). Its members learn clairsentience and use their sensory powers to become scouts and detectives.

The Legions
Based in Austronesia, these are high tech military corps (similar to that found in Starship Troopers), using the powers of psychokinesis to protect humanity from extrasolar threats.

Ministry of Psionic Affairs
Also called the Ministry of Noetic Affairs, this cloak and dagger spy agency is based in China and a part of the Chinese government. Members are skilled in telepathy and are the most secretive and mistrusted of the Orders for their abilities.

Nova Força Nacional (Portuguese for "The New National Force")
Also known as the Norça, this Order takes the form of a vigilante militia, based somewhere in the jungles of South America. They wield the powers of biokinesis, and possess complete biological mastery over their physical forms. They are as widely, if not more, distrusted than the Ministry.

Orgotek
A multinational technology corporation headquartered in North America, its members are all employees in some fashion or another. They can control the electromagnetic spectrum with the electrokinesis Aptitude. They often take the role of technical experts and engineers.

Upeo wa Macho (Swahili for "Horizon")
The Upeo are an African trade organization with the teleportation Aptitude. Although they had been missing for six years as of the core rules, they have since returned, although their absence has not altogether been explained to the public. With their return, regular contact with extrasolar colonies is being re-established.

Chitra Bhanu
The Chibs are an Indian physics laboratory with the ability to manipulate the nuclear forces of the universe (quantakinesis). They were exterminated because the other Psi Orders claimed that they had an alliance with the monstrous Aberrants, although there have been rumors of survivors either hiding on their own, or working secretly for other orders.

== System ==
The game originally ran on a modified version of the White Wolf Storyteller System. A reprint was announced in late 2003 of the three Trinity Universe games using the Open Gaming License 3.5 rules, also known as the d20 System. The current version, by Onyx Path Publishing, became one of the first games to use the Storypath variant of Storyteller.

== Books ==
=== Storyteller System ===
- Trinity Core rulebook (two hard cover editions; limited and unlimited, and a soft cover edition)
- Hidden Agendas: Storyteller's Screen and Book (screen with adventure & background sourcebook)
- Darkness Revealed 1: Descent into Darkness (adventure book, March 1998)
- Darkness Revealed 2: Passage Through Shadow (adventure book, August 1998)
- Darkness Revealed 3: Ascent into Light (adventure book, December 1998)
- Alien Encounter 1: Invasion (adventure book)
- Alien Encounter 2: Deception (adventure book)
- Trinity Players' Guide (background and rules expansion)
- Technology Manual (technology sourcebook)
- Luna Rising: Psi Order ISRA & Luna Sourcebook
- America Offline: Psi Order Orgotek & FSA Sourcebook
- Shattered Europe: Psi Order Æsculapian & Europe Sourcebook
- Stellar Frontier: Psi Order Upeo wa Macho & Extrasolar space Sourcebook (May 1999)
- Aurora Australis: Psi Order Legions & Austronesia Sourcebook
- Terra Verde: Psi Order Norça & Sudamérica Sourcebook (solely available in electronic form)
- Asia Ascendant: Psi Order Ministry & Asia Sourcebook (unpublished manuscript released by game line developer Bruce Baugh, solely available in electronic form)
- Trinity Field Report: Extrasolar Colonies (mini sourcebook)
- Trinity Field Report: Alien Races (mini sourcebook)
- Trinity Field Report: Psi Laws (mini sourcebook)
- Trinity Field Report: Media (mini sourcebook)
- Trinity Field Report: Oceania (mini sourcebook, solely in electronic form)
- Trinity Field Report: Corporate Life (mini sourcebook, solely in electronic form)

=== d20 System ===
- Trinity d20

=== Storypath System ===
- Trinity Continuum Core Rulebook
- Trinity Continuum: Æon
- Trinity Continuum: Æon Reference Screen
- Quantum Entanglement: A Trinity Continuum: Æon Jumpstart (a starter adventure which pays homage to The Last Gasp, the starter adventure found in 1st Edition's Hidden Agendas booklet)
- Æon Æxpansion (additional content that didn't fit in the core: additional technology, mechs, and additional character types: psiads and superiors)
- Æon Ready-Made Characters (a handful of playable starter characters)
- Distant Worlds (further details on the six colonies included in the Æon core, plus a bunch of additional worlds waiting to be discovered, and rules for playing the Qin aliens)
- Terra Firma (a guide to Earth and Luna, featuring each major region and one city from that region)
- Under Alien Skies (a guide to the various alien races of the setting, and guidelines on how to create your own)
- Prometheus Unbound (a guide to the setting's eight Psi Orders)
- Dawn and Meridian (novellas)
- Storypath Tasty Bit: Pets (a brief PDF akin to 1st Edition's Trinity Field Reports, focusing on animal companions)

=== Fan-written supplements ===
- Absolute Zero Player's Guide (book by EON, solely in electronic form)
- India Underground: Psi Order Chitra Bhanu & Bharati Commonwealth Sourcebook (book by EON, solely in electronic form)
- Trinity Field Report: Noetic Science (mini sourcebook by EON, solely in electronic form)
- Trinity: Awaiting Inspiration (mini sourcebook by EON, solely in electronic form)

== Naming issue ==
Trinity was originally to be known as Æon (thus leading to all three games in the line having titles starting with an A), and was originally issued under that title in its hardback and deluxe versions. Legal issues arose with the holders of the rights for the animated series Æon Flux, which claimed the game challenged their trademarks. The matter was settled by White Wolf choosing to change the name of its game, and leaving "Æon" as the unofficial name for the whole line. Early copies of the game had a sticker with the new Trinity logo covering the original Æon logo.

Once White Wolf sold the IP to Onyx Path Publishing, the old Æon name returned as Trinity Continuum: Æon.

== Reception ==
The reviewer from Pyramid #29 (Jan./Feb., 1998) stated that "Hope. Sacrifice. Unity. Strong words used to define the spirit of Trinity, the new science-fiction roleplaying game from White Wolf."

== Reviews ==
- Backstab #6 (as Aeon)
- SF Site
- SF Site
- Casus Belli #111 (as Aeon)
