= Darkness Revealed 3: Ascent into Light =

Role-playing game adventure

Darkness Revealed 3: Ascent into Light is a 1998 role-playing game adventure published by White Wolf Publishing for Trinity.

== Plot summary ==
Darkness Revealed 3 is an adventure which takes place in North America, extrasolar space and Africa.

== Reviews ==
- InQuest Gamer #49
- Backstab #14
