= Three-Dragon Ante =

Card game based on Dungeons and Dragons

Three-Dragon Ante (ISBN 0-7869-4072-7) is a card game developed by Rob Heinsoo, and published by Wizards of the Coast in November 2005. The game is a combination of luck and skill, and blends concepts from traditional card games such as poker, hearts, and rummy.

Based on Dungeons & Dragons (D&D), it is intended as a game in its own right or as an element in a role-playing campaign, and appears in some versions of D&D as a game played by the wealthy for money.

In April 2010, Wizards of the Coast released a follow-up game, Three-Dragon Ante: Emperor's Gambit, which added additional dragon types and was both playable alone, and with the original game cards.

== Cards ==
The deck consists of 70 cards (plus two reference cards). The structure of the deck is reminiscent of standard playing card or Tarot decks. Each card in the deck represents either a dragon or a mortal, has a strength between 1 and 13, and a special ability or power. Six cards are initially dealt to each player. There is a maximum hand size of ten cards and players are not allowed to have more than the maximum at any time. Players keep their hands secret from the other players. The undealt cards are placed face-down into a draw pile from which players take new cards.

== Gameplay ==
The game is recommended for 2 to 6 players, each of whom begins with 50 points (called gold). The game is divided into gambits in which gold is added and subtracted from the stakes (similar to the pot in poker). Each gambit normally has three rounds (four or more can break ties). In each round, players play cards in front of them (comprising their flight). The strongest flight is the one with cards summing the highest numerical value. After each gambit, each player draws two cards. All ante cards and flights are then discarded. When the last card is drawn from the pile, you shuffle the discard pile and it replaces the draw pile.

In a gambit, players initially choose a card from their hand to ante-up (see poker). The highest ante determines the amount of gold every player must pay to the stakes.

The player with the highest ante plays first, triggering the special ability of their dragon. The special powers of each card varies from allowing players to draw more cards or steal money – from the stakes or other players. In general, good dragons allow players to gain cards, whereas evil dragons allow players to get more gold from the pot or other players. Mortals are especially powerful, so players often maneuver to trigger their mortals' special power.

After the first card in the round is played, players play cards in clockwise order. If the value of the card is less than or equal to the one played before it in the round, it triggers. Otherwise, it does not. The highest dragon in a given round determines the leader of the next round. The first card played in every round always triggers.

Most gambits end after three rounds, though occasionally a tie extends it to four or more rounds. In either case, the strongest flight (sum of the values of each player's three cards) wins. Additionally, special flights (color or strength) allow players to earn extra gold or cards. Players must buy cards from the deck if they run out of cards. The cost of new cards is determined randomly by flipping the top card of the draw pile; the player pays its cost in gold. This commonly happens, since replacing cards can be difficult.

The game ends when one player's hoard runs out at the end of a gambit. Optional alternate endings are also suggested in the rules.

=== Dragons ===
With few exceptions, each dragon has a strength and a color. A dragon's strength is shown in the top-left and bottom-right corners of the card. The color of the dragon determines its alignment and powers:

- Colors of evil dragons: Black, Blue, Green, Red, White. Tiamat and Dracolich are also evil.
- Colors of good dragons: Brass, Bronze, Copper, Gold, and Silver. Bahamut is also good.

=== Special Flights ===
- Color Flight: Three dragons of the same color earn a player the second strongest dragon's strength in gold from each player
- Strength Flight: Three dragons of the same strength earn a player one of those dragon's strength in gold from the stakes and all the remaining ante cards (up to a ten card hand)

Only dragons count in special flights but house rules can allow three mortals to be played as a color flight called a fellowship.

=== Dragon Gods ===
- Tiamat: strength 13 and colorless, though this card counts as any Evil color when making color flights. When a player's flight includes Tiamat and a good dragon, that player cannot win the gambit.
- Bahamut: strength 13 and colorless. When a player's flight includes Bahamut and an evil dragon, that player cannot win the gambit.

Bahamut also has a normal power that triggers like the power of any regular dragon.

=== Undead Dragon ===
Dracolich: strength 10 and colorless.

=== Mortals ===
Mortals are non-dragon cards, such as The Thief or The Druid. Mortals do not count in special flights but house rules can allow three mortals to be played as a color flight called a fellowship.

== Strategy ==
The game's strategy centers on correctly estimating the value of one's hand in order to ante appropriately. The order of play is important, with prominent advantages going to the first player (whose card always triggers) and the players who get to play later in the round. It is particularly important to plan one's order of play in a gambit.

For example, players with weak hands should ante low and seek to steal as much gold from the stakes and other players as possible, generally by playing low-strength dragons. Also, playing strength and color flights, even if they are not successful in winning gambits, can be effective at gaining gold.

Players with high strength cards should not hesitate to ante high and make a play for the stakes. There are two advantages to this approach. First, the highest ante starts the first round, causing his or her first dragon to automatically trigger. Second, the highest strength dragon determines who starts the next round. As the card played by the first player in every round always triggers, playing higher than the opposition in late position can greatly aid one's chances.

One mortal, The Druid, allows the lowest strength flight to win the gambit (reversing the normal rules). Several strategies revolve around disguising one's intent to play the druid and other low-strength cards to unexpectedly run away with the stakes. The Thief, who allows the player to steal 7 gold from the stakes if it triggers, is also a powerful mortal card that helps players with weak hands. For players attempting to win the gambit by playing high cards, The Dragon Slayer is another powerful mortal.

Finally, it is often in one's own interest to help other players, particularly to prevent them from losing (and thus ending the game). It is common to see players trailing the gold leader (but still conceivably competitive) to keep their comrades alive in the hope of catching up.

== Criticism ==
Critics of the game suggest that Three-Dragon Ante's major weakness is that the strategy varies so much according to the number of players. It is particularly important to win gambits in large games (4+ players), whereas stealing gold from the stakes is effective in games with only 2–3 players. Strength flights are also relatively more important in large games. Also, because the deck size is fixed, the rule-changing cards like The Druid come up more often in large games. This non-linear scaling causes game time to vary radically with the number of players. Games with 4+ players usually end within an hour, but games with fewer players can continue indefinitely. House rules, such as adjusting the effect of the strength flights or the starting gold given to each player, can help alleviate these problems. Another solution is to set a certain number of gambits as a match; the player with the most gold at the end of the match wins. Some of the suggested House Rules are now part of the official rules in the "Legendary Edition", as of September 2019. Starting Gold per player is no longer fixed at 50, but is now 10 Gold times the number of players (in a 2 player game, each starts with 20 Gold, whereas in a 6 player game, each starts with 60 Gold – if longer games are desired, the multiplier increases, such as 12 Gold times the number of players, which would, on average, give a 20% longer game). A Strength Flight no longer gives a player all the remaining Ante cards (up to 10 in their hand), it now gives a fixed 2 Ante cards (still to a maximum of 10 in hand), which helps keep it consistent at various player counts.

Another camp holds that the unexpected shifts in strategy caused by changes to the number of players is an asset rather than a weakness. It makes the game more versatile and forces players to compete in new ways and use the cards differently. While game length can be an issue, house rules (as suggested above and recommended in the rule book) are more than sufficient to counter this issue.

== Terminology ==
- Ante Card: the card each player plays that determines the leader for the gambit's first round.
- Color Flight: Three dragons of the same color.
- Evil dragon: cards that help you gain gold (from the stakes or other players). Includes colors of the chromatic spectrum: Black, Blue, Green, Red, and White.
- Flight: the cards a player has in play. If three or more dragons in a flight are the same color or the same strength (a special flight), bonuses are awarded.
- Gambit: a set of three (or more) rounds.
- Gold: the scoring system is expressed as pieces of gold. Players begin with 50 gold. Note that you will need to provide your own gold, chips, or other accounting system. In two-player games, score can often be kept with pencil and paper.
- Good dragons: cards that help you gain new cards. Includes colors of the metallic spectrum: Brass, Bronze, Copper, Gold, and Silver.
- Hoard: a player's gold.
- Leader: the first player of each round is the Leader.
- Power: when triggered, a power allows a player to steal gold or cards, take ante cards, or change the fundamental rules of the game.
- Round: set of turns equal to the number of players. For example, in a two player game, a round consists of 2 turns. In a 6 player game a round consists of 6 turns.
- Special Flight: when three or more dragons in a flight are the same color or the same strength. The player wins bonuses for special flights.
- Stakes: the pot or kitty.
- Strength Flight: Three dragons of the same strength.
- Stronger dragon: a dragon whose strength is greater than the strength of the card just played.
- Weaker dragon: a dragon whose strength is less than the strength of the card just played.
