= Aberrant (role-playing game) =

1999 superhero role-playing game

- 2nd edition cover art by Tom Fleming; The same artwork was used for 1st edition
- Designers: Robert Hatch, Kraig Blackwelder, Andrew Bates, Ken Cliffe, Greg Fountain, Sheri M. Johnson, Chris McDonough, Ethan Skemp, Mike Tinney, Richard Thomas, Stephan Wieck, Fred Yelk, Ian Watson
- Publishers: White Wolf Game Studio (1st edition, d20 edition); Onyx Path Publishing (2nd edition)
- Publication: 1999 (1st edition); 2004 (d20 edition); 2021 (Storypath Edition)
- Genres: Superhero
- Systems: Storyteller System (1st edition) d20 System (d20 edition); Storypath System (2nd edition)

Aberrant is a superhero role-playing game published by White Wolf Game Studio in 1999, and is a sequel to the previously published science-fiction role-playing game Trinity, and one of three games in the 'Trinity Universe' line.

== Description ==
=== Setting ===
Aberrant is set on an alternate Earth, where in 1998, a nuclear-powered space station exploded, scattering clouds of radioactive dust over the planet. In the months and years that followed, thousands of people spontaneously manifested superhuman powers. Ten years later — the setting of the game — under the watchful eye Project Utopia, humans with superpowers are known as "novas". While peace and prosperity had been predicted as novas use their powers for good, signs are beginning to manifest that many novas have gone rogue, turned to evil or simply tender their powers to the highest bidder. The player characters can join the side of good and help the police, choose to join a terrorist organization, or remain in a gray area in between the two, often as a mercenary or troubleshooter.

The setting includes several important organizations and factions related directly to the novas:

- Project Utopia, an organization with seemingly altruistic ideals that promotes cooperation between Novas and humans to build a more perfect world.
- Project Proteus, a group that takes care of the "dirty work" of keeping novas in line.
- The Teragen, a diverse group of novas who claim to have biological superiority over humans.
- The Aberrants, a group of novas concerned about evidence of corruption within Project Utopia.
- The Directive, an intelligence organization controlled by the governments of Russia, the United Kingdom, Germany, Japan and the United States.

=== Character creation ===
Players are given a pool of creation points that are used on the nine abilities, giving each one a score of 1 to 5. The balance of creation points is spent on buying skills from a table of thirty skills. In addition, players can use points to buy a "mega-characteristic", which indicates one of their nine abilities is well beyond normal human values.

=== Game system ===
The original edition of Aberrant uses a variant of White Wolf's Storyteller System. The second edition moved to the d20 System. The third edition uses the Storypath System.

== Publication history ==
In 1997, White Wolf released Trinity, an action-oriented science fiction role-playing game. Two years later, a White Wolf creative team led by Robert Hatch developed Aberrant, a role-playing game set in the same alternative Earth as Trinity, but focussed on humans who have developed superpowers. White Wolf also published the third game in what was now called the Trinity Universe line, the pulp action role-playing game Adventure!

Although several supplements for Aberrant were promised that would flesh out the setting, none of the games in the Trinity Universe sold well — in the words of critic Tristan Lhomme, "[The trilogy] was a critical success. In other words, it sold very poorly" — and shortly after Aberrant and Adventure! were released, the entire Trinity Universe line was discontinued.

In 2004, White Wolf tried to revive the Trinity Universe line by converting all three games to the d20 System, but failed to find an audience, and the games were quickly discontinued.

In 2021, Onyx Path Publishing created a third edition of the Trinity Universe, retitled Trinity Continuum, that used their StoryPath System. This included a new version of Aberrant, retitled Trinity Continuum: Aberrant.

== Publications ==
- Aberrant Core rulebook (two editions, limited and unlimited)
- Aberrant Storyteller's screen and companion (Gamemaster's screen with adventure & background sourcebook)
- Aberrant Worldwide: Phase I (adventure book)
- Aberrant Worldwide: Phase II (adventure book)
- Aberrant Players Guide (background and rules expansion)
- Aberrant: Year One (setting book)
- Project Utopia
- Teragen
- The Directive
- Elites
- Underworld (solely available in electronic form)
- Brainwaves (unpublished manuscript released by author Steve Kenson, solely available in electronic form)
- Exposé: Aberrants (mini sourcebook)
- XWF (mini sourcebook)
- Fear and Loathing (mini sourcebook)
- ReignofEvil.com (mini sourcebook)
- Church of Michael Archangel (mini sourcebook)

== Reception ==
In Issue 121 of the French games magazine Casus Belli, Tristan Lhomme pointed out that much of the setting was missing, and was promised in future supplements. "Upon reading the core rulebook, the gamemaster is left with a bunch of clues tending to prove that, let's say, Project Utopia isn't run by choirboys. But he has no certainty. A little further on, a note from the authors explains that they know perfectly well where they're going, that they've created plenty of 'super-secrets', but that they reserve the right to reveal them to us in coming supplements. In a year or so, a half-dozen booklets will give us an "official" chronology of the years 2008-2010 and a framework on which to orchestrate the revelation of secrets." Lhomme also questioned the very elaborate setting, asking, "Was it really necessary to create such a nuanced setting for a game where, clearly, fighting is the main focus?" Lhomme concluded by admiring "The (real) intelligence of the background, and the feat accomplished by the developers in adapting the White Wolf system to superheroes." But Lhomme didn't like "Being forced to wait for loads of yet-to-be-written supplements to understand the ins and outs of the background."

In Issue 15 of Rue Morgue, Wes Johnson commented, "Art in these books is standard for the industry; that is it ranges from way good to not bad. The layout is nice, and seems to be meant to evoke Web surfing. The writing is very strong; it managed to capture my interest." Johnson concluded, "The idea of super-powered serial killers, or stalkers, or pro-wrestlers can be pretty cool. Mix and match demons and vampires or ghosts with what you are given and it could be pretty entertaining. I think this game is worth a look, if nothing else."

In Issue 49 of the French games magazine Backstab, Geoffrey Picard reviewed the d20 version released in 2004 and commented, "The great advantage of this superhero game is that it presents a credible context. The star system and media manipulation allow for all sorts of scenarios. The most dangerous plots can be led by normal politicians. The novas, whether they serve the police or join terrorist organizations, are not caricatures." Picard also pointed out that the storylines and settings in the supplements published for the first edition would still be usable with this edition.
