= The Algernon Files =

The Algernon Files is a 2004 role-playing game supplement published by BlackWyrm Games for Mutants & Masterminds.

== Contents ==
The Algernon Files is a supplement in which brief setting material is offered alongside over a hundred hero and villain stat blocks, plus maps, vehicles, new powers, feats, and additional rules options.

== Reviews ==
- Pyramid
- Fictional Reality (Issue 17 - Sep 2004)
- Knights of the Dinner Table Magazine (Issue 164 - Jun 2010)
