= Adiante =

In Greek mythology, Adiante (Ancient Greek: Ἀδιάντη, lit. 'not enough' or 'too much involved') was one of the 50 Danaïdes, daughters of Danaus, king of Libya (and later of Argos).

== Family ==
Adiante's mother was Herse and thus, sister to Hippodice.

== Mythology ==
Adiante and her sisters were forced into a mass marriage with their fifty cousins — the sons of King Aegyptus of Egypt. Like her other 48 sisters (saved Hypermnestra), on the wedding night under her father's orders, Adiante killed her husband Daiphron, son of Aegyptus by Hephaestine.

As punishment in Tartarus, she is forced to carry water in a leaky jar or bowl to fill a bottomless tub—an endless task repeated for eternity.
