= Four Bastards: A Feng Shui Scenario Sourcebook =

Four Bastards: A Feng Shui Scenario Sourcebook is a 2000 role-playing game adventure published by Atlas Games for Feng Shui.

== Plot summary ==
Four Bastards is an adventure in which the player characters must stop the Four Bastards from gaining control of the world's chi.

== Reviews ==
- Pyramid
- Backstab (as "Quatre Bâtards")
