= Foes of Freedom =

Role-playing game supplement

Foes of Freedom is a 2004 role-playing game supplement published by Green Ronin Publishing for Mutants & Masterminds.

== Contents ==
Foes of Freedom is a supplement in which the Freedom City setting is expanded with dozens of new villains, villain teams, and additional feats and powers to challenge heroes and enrich campaigns.

== Reviews ==
- Pyramid
- Fictional Reality (Issue 18 - Dec 2004)
