= META-4 =

META-4 Campaign Setting
- Designers: Super Unicorn
- Publishers: Green Ronin Publishing
- Publication: September 30, 2003
- Genres: Superhero fiction
- Systems: d20 System

META-4 is a fictional campaign setting for the roleplaying game Mutants & Masterminds. It was created by Super Unicorn members Erik Mona, Kyle Hunter, and Sean Glenn who were contracted for design studio for the M&M 1st edition line. The setting was initially created to give the character backgrounds in the Mutants and Masterminds 1st edition core book more life. It was further detailed with a full history in Crooks!

== Inhabitants ==
=== The META-4 Agency ===
META-4 is a government agency much like the CIA, whose task is to oversee superhuman activities. The agency consists of both human and superhuman operatives. They are also broken into four branches, each with its own color uniform. The agency is currently run by director Talia Thorne.

==== The Reserve ====
The current superhuman program run by META-4. The team acts as both a training ground for new recruits, as well as a force against superhuman threats. The team is known as the Reserve as they are generally utilized for larger threats; ordinary criminal activity is handled by local law enforcement and other non-affiliated superhumans.

Current core group:

- Marathon - a super speedster.
- Minotaur - a former Green Beret, given superpowers through the ANTAG program's Man/Myth project. One of the most disciplined members of the project, he was moved to META-4 and the Reserve for active duty. His goal is to capture the other members of the Man/Myth project, who are now known as the Bestiary. Known powers are super strength and super toughness.
- Inferna - Minotaur's longtime partner in the fight against the Bestiary. Known powers include various methods of fire control and flight.

Other members: The Reserve has had a few rotating members who help occasionally for short stints:

- Cyclone
- Knock-Off
- Protonik
- The Pugilist

Deceased members:

- Argus - left in a vegetative state after a fight with Fuse.
- Ant Devil - killed in a fight with Fuse.

==== The Statesmen Initiative ====
Following defeat in the Vietnam War, and faced with an ever-growing population of super-powered citizens, the United States government formed a team of government-sanctioned heroes ready to meet any domestic or international threat. The team was made up of 50 heroes, once from each state in the Union. The core team was made up of Trinity (NM), Skyscraper Joe (NY), Kittyhawk (NC), Calamity Jane Doe (SD), and Bigfoot (WA). Other members included Hotrod (MI), Jersey Devil (NJ), Bunyan Babe (MN), and the Connecticut Yankee (CT).

Eventually, poor publicity from the hero-turned-rogue St. Elmo (MA), coupled with Congressional investigations of financial irregularities and a string of defeats in the early 1980s, led to problems for the team. After the loss of Trinity in their battle with the Atomic Brain in early 1982, the team splintered and was disbanded by the end of the year.

=== Other superhuman teams of Arcadia ===
==== Bestiary ====
A group of villains seeking to grow stronger and show their real worth. Originally created by ANTAG, a government research program whose goal was to create new superhuman soldiers. They were part of the Man/Myth project along with Argus and Minotaur. These members however turned unstable during a mission to Iraq. The ANTAG program was subsequently taken over by META-4. Since then, The Reserve and Bestiary have become arch rivals.

- Behemoth - a large blue beast of a man.
- Chimera - the team leader.
- Cockatrice - can turn people to stone with just a look.
- Griffon
- Manticore
- Undine - a woman who looks like a fish & can control water.

==== The Front ====
Soon after becoming President in 1992, Ben Farmer began receiving threats from terrorist groups and super villains. In response to this threat, Farmer formed the Front, a group of presidentially-appointed super heroes who acted as body guards under direct order of the President. With his election in 2000, President Bert Lando replaced Farmer's team with a new group more loyal to him. New members included Alpha Male, Primute and Radiomega.

==== The Upstarts ====
A group of younger, inexperienced heroes.

=== Other superhuman heroes of Arcadia ===
- Gimmick
- The Luciferian
- Twist

=== Current villains ===
- Atomic Brain
- Blitz
- Damocles
- Fuse - villain responsible for the death of President Ben Farmer in 1995.
- Gepetto
- Moonquake
- The Nihilist
- Sister Blister
- Spasm
