= Darkness Revealed 1: Descent Into Darkness =

1998 role playing game adventure

- Publisher: White Wolf Publishing
- Publication date: 1998

Darkness Revealed 1: Descent Into Darkness is a 1998 role-playing game adventure published by White Wolf Publishing for Trinity.

== Plot summary ==
Darkness Revealed 1 is an adventure on the Moon.

== Reviews ==
- InQuest Gamer #49
- Backstab #9
- Dragon #250
