= Aberrant Players Guide =

Aberrant Players Guide is a 2000 role-playing game supplement published by White Wolf Publishing for Aberrant.

== Contents ==
Aberrant Players Guide is a supplement in which details are given for more powers for characters.

== Reviews ==
- Pyramid
- Backstab
