= Daedalus Entertainment =

Daedalus Entertainment was a Canadian game company that produced role-playing games and game supplements.

== History ==
In the early 1990s, while Jose Garcia was working in a video store in Toronto, he decided to start a games company. He talked to Peter Adkison and John Nephew about the games market, and attended the GAMA trade show to learn more. With his sister Maria, Garcia then set up Daedelus Games. Robin Laws approached Garcia in 1993 with an idea for a Hong Kong Action Cinema RPG; Garcia liked the idea, but the role-playing game Nexus: The Infinite City was his first priority, and was published in 1994 with Garcia as the main designer and developer, with Laws, Bruce Baugh, and Rob Heinsoo as additional authors.

Daedalus Games was incorporated as Daedalus Entertainment in preparation for publishing the Hong Kong action game Laws had intended, but Garcia liked the setting that Laws was working on and decided to use it as a basis of a collectible card game (CCG) to take advantage of what seemed to be the strong (CCG) market. Daedalus published this CCG as Shadowfist (1995). Daedalus Entertainment also published the role-playing game Feng Shui (1996), designed by Laws using a variant of the Nexus game system; Laws also designed supplements for Feng Shui.

Stephan Michael Sechi licensed Daedalus to publish the 4th edition of the role-playing game Talislanta, for which Laws would create the rules. However, that project was never completed. When the CCG market crashed in 1997, Daedelus was left financially overextended due to their investment in Shadowfist cards. The staff of Daedalus, including Laws, were laid off or quit, leaving Garcia and his sister Maria as the only people working for the company. Daedalus filed for chapter 11 bankruptcy protection, and when the company sold off a few of its properties a few years later, Feng Shui went to Laws.
