= Terra Mystica =

Board game

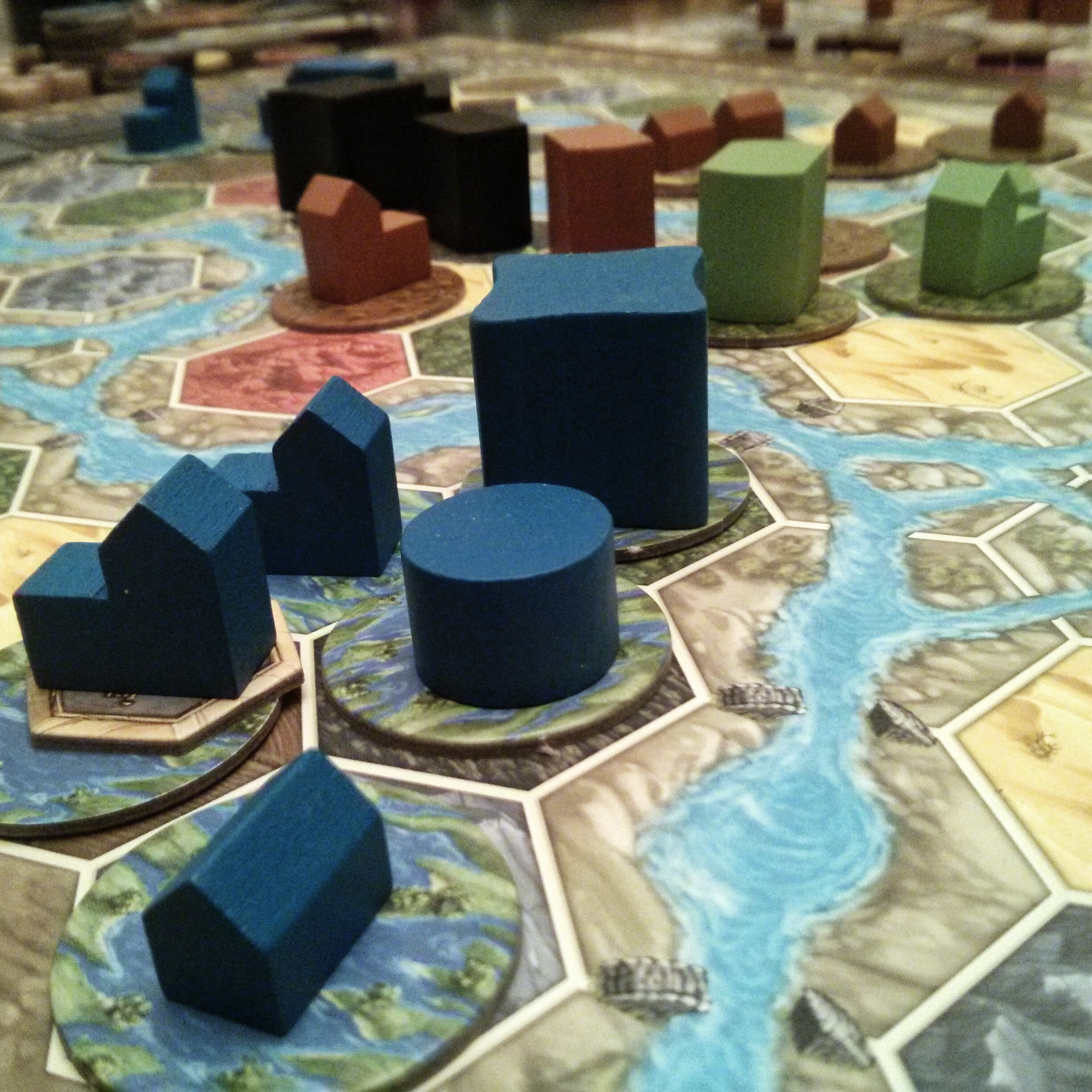
- Designers: Helge Ostertag and Jens Drögemüller
- Players: 2 to 5
- Setup time: Approx. 10 minutes
- Playing time: 30 minutes per player
- Chance: Very low
- Age range: 12 years and up
- Skills: Resource management, economic planning
- Website: http://www.terra-mystica-spiel.de/en/

Terra Mystica is a Euro-style board game for two to five players designed by Helge Ostertag and Jens Drögemüller. The game was first published by Feuerland Spiele in Germany in 2012, and was later published in English and French by Zman Games and Filosofia Édition in 2013. Feuerland Spiele released a second German edition of the game in 2013.

== Gameplay ==
Terrain types on an original Terra Mystica board (Forest, Mountain, Wasteland, Desert, Plain, Swamp and Lakes) and the number of spades needed to terraform between them

The game starts with each player picking one of fourteen fantasy factions, each with its own unique special abilities and costs associated with actions. Players expand their territories by constructing buildings on the game board. Each faction is limited to building on only one of seven different terrain types found on the game board; this makes terraforming spaces so they can be built upon a key aspect of the game.

The game is split into six rounds during which players take any number of actions to improve their society. Actions may involve settling new spaces, upgrading existing buildings, improving infrastructure like shipping, or increasing the faction's status in an elemental cult. When a player cannot perform any more actions (or they choose not to), they must pass. A round ends upon all players passing.

One unique aspect of the game is its power point mechanic. Power points are used to cast spells, and may also be converted for resources. Power points are split among three bowls. When points are gained, they first move from bowl one to bowl two. When bowl one is empty, they can move from bowl two to bowl three. Power points can only be used when they are in bowl three, at which point they return to bowl one.

Victory points are accrued throughout the game for a variety of actions. The game lasts for six rounds, at the end of which additional victory points are awarded for end-game goals. The player with the most victory points wins.

== Expansions ==
- Four additional town tiles were handed out as a free promotional expansion at Spiel 2013.
- An additional bonus tile was included in the June 2013 edition of Spielbox.
- A full expansion to the game, Terra Mystica: Fire & Ice, was released in November 2014. It introduces six new factions, two new terrain types and new rules variants.
- A new promo expansion, Terra Mystica: Erweiterungsbogen (or Terra Mystica Mini-Expansion in North America), was released in 2015. It contains the previously released town tiles and bonus tile along with a new round scoring tile and new terrain tiles for each faction to better balance the game. Suggested rules for the faction town tiles were created as part of a contest by the Board Game Geek community.
- A mobile app of the game was released in April 2017 and ported to Steam on June 8, 2017. The Fire & Ice expansion is included with the Steam port and is available as an additional purchase for the mobile version of the game.
- A new expansion, Terra Mystica: Age of Innovation, was announced in May 2018 and was expected to be released in 2019. It was released in 2023 as its own standalone game, titled Age of Innovation.
- In 2018, Gaia Project was released as a science fiction version of Terra Mystica. It features many of the same mechanisms as Terra Mystica but many of the systems have been streamlined.
- A second full expansion to Terra Mystica, called Terra Mystica: Merchants of the Seas, was released in late 2019. It introduces a new structure for each faction (including the Fire & Ice factions), the Shipyard, which can be used to build ships that can travel along river spaces and trade with other players' structures. Some factions have additional abilities once they build their Shipyard. It also includes new bonus cards and favor tiles and a new set of round scoring tiles.

=== Unofficial ===
- The fan-made expansion Artifacts was made in 2015. It introduces cards that player can take when they pass in the final round that award extra points depending on what they have done during the game. It is free to print and play on BGG.

== Awards ==
- 2013 Deutscher Spiele Preis, 1st place
- 2013 International Gamers Award, Multiplayer Strategy Game, 1st place
- 2013 Jogoeu User's Game, Adult Game of the Year, 1st place
- 2013 Hra Roku, Game of the Year Winner
- 2013 Gouden Ludo, Winner
- 2013 Le Tric Trac d'Or
- 2013 Nederlandse Spellenprijs Best Expert Game Winner

== Critical reception and influence ==
As of May 2017, the game was ranked fourth on BoardGameGeek, and has been cited as one of the most influential board games of the last decade.

Shut Up & Sit Down gave the game an overwhelmingly positive review.

Ryan Meltzer of the Dice Tower gave the game a generally positive review, and Tom Vasel, also of the Dice Tower, gave the game a mixed review, saying that he could not be sure how well balanced it was without first playing the game many more times.

Terra Mystica's upgrade system was the inspiration for a similar system in Scythe.
