= Bruce Baugh =

American game designer

- Occupation: Game designer

Bruce Baugh is a game designer who has worked primarily on role-playing games.

== Career ==
Bruce Baugh was one of the many authors that Jose Garcia collected together to help fill out his role-playing game Nexus: The Infinite City (1994).

Baugh co-wrote the supplements Doomslayers: Into the Labyrinth for Wraith: The Oblivion and Darkness Revealed 2: Passage Through Shadow for Trinity, which were published by White Wolf Publishing in 1998. Baugh wrote the revised version of Clanbook: Lasombra, published in 2001. White Wolf Games Studio contracted with Baugh in late 2002 to develop a new edition of the Gamma World role-playing game. Baugh has also written novels, including Judgment Day (2004) for Mage: The Ascension.

Baugh contributed settings to the Tri-Stat cyberpunk role-playing game Ex Machina (2004). Baugh has also worked as a freelancer for Ronin Arts.

== Works ==
- Doomslayers: Into the Labyrinth (1998) for Wraith: The Oblivion with Bruce Baugh and Fred Yelk
- Ends of Empire (1999) for Wraith: The Oblivion with Bruce Baugh, Richard Dansky, and Ed Huang
- Wraith: The Great War (1999) with Bruce Baugh, E. Jonathan Bennet, Mark Cencyzk, and Richard Dansky
- Golden Comeback (2000) for Feng Shui with Greg Stolze, Bruce Baugh, Tim Dedopulos, and Rob Heinsoo
- Clanbook: Lasombra 2nd Edition (2001) for Vampire: The Masquerade
