= Shadowfist =

Collectible card game

- Shadowfist card back
- Designers: Robin Laws and Jose Garcia
- Publishers: Vetusta Games, Inner Kingdom Games, Z-Man Games, Daedalus Entertainment
- Players: 2 or more
- Setup time: 5–10 minutes
- Playing time: variable
- Chance: Some
- Skills: Card playing Arithmetic; Diplomacy

Shadowfist is a card game created by Robin Laws and Jose Garcia. It was released in June 1995 as a collectible card game (CCG), but was shifted to a fixed distribution of cards as of 2013. It shares the same background as Feng Shui, a role-playing game created by Laws and Garcia and released the following year. In September 2018 ownership of Shadowfist transferred to Vetusta Games.

== Overview ==
Shadowfist is a multi-player asymmetrical strategic game, the design of which is influenced by games such as Cosmic Encounter, Dune by Avalon Hill, Magic: The Gathering and its direct predecessor, On the Edge.

Shadowfist is primarily inspired by Hong Kong action cinema and wuxia films of the late 1980s and 1990s, and by action films in general. In the game, various factions from across time battle for control of the world's Feng Shui sites in a conflict known as the "Secret War." Time travel takes place through an alternate dimension known as the Netherworld which opens to various time junctures. The current open junctures are AD 86, 1867, and 2013. The pulp (1942) and future (2072) junctures were closed with the 2013 Combat in Kowloon release. Unlike Feng Shui, Shadowfist's time junctures move forward as time actually progresses, permitting new game releases to reflect the present.

The titles of cards and the flavor text in the game are rife with humor and pop culture references, especially the Jammers faction, which contains cards such as "Furious George" and "Entropy is Your Friend."

== Publication history ==
Shadowfist is a collectible card game that was originally published by Daedalus Entertainment until the company went out of business in 1996. In 2000, the license for the game was acquired by Zev Shlasinger, who established Z-Man Games to reissue the title. Z-Man Games released ten additional sets over the following five years before focusing on other projects. In 2006, a group of players formed Shadowfist Games to continue producing expansions. This group collaborated with Shlasinger to publish three more sets between 2006 and 2009.

Shadowfist remained a CCG, with randomized distribution of cards within decks or packs, from its inception through the last Shadowfist Games set in 2009. No new sets were then published, until 2013.

The game was then published by Inner Kingdom Games, founded by Daniel Griego and Braz King, but then managed solely by Griego. The card set that would become Combat in Kowloon and Back for Seconds (in January 2013) were originally slated to be a single booster pack release using the long-standing CCG model. It carried the working title "Hong Kong 2010" from its design and development in 2009 through play-testing in 2010 and art design in early 2011.

In 2011, Inner Kingdom Games re-published the award-winning Seven Masters vs. the Underworld expansion. After only moderate success with this release, Inner Kingdom Games switched Shadowfist from the CCG model to the fixed distribution Dynamic Card Game (DCG) model. The DCG model was directly inspired by the Living Card Game (LCG) model used by several other card games, many of which also transitioned from the CCG model.

To fund new sets, Inner Kingdom Games conducted a Kickstarter campaign in August 2012 that exceeded the required funding targets. Inner Kingdom Games broke up "Hong Kong 2010" into two separate releases ("Combat in Kowloon" and "Back for Seconds"), and published them beginning in January 2013.

Following the release of Combat in Kowloon and Back for Seconds, 2013 saw the release of the first expansion block in the DCG model. Dubbed the "Rebirth Cycle" It included the decks, "Reloaded", "Reinforcements", and "Revelations". Reloaded is composed primarily of reprinted cards deemed necessary for the new environment. Included with these were nine new cards and updates to seven previously printed cards. Reinforcements and Revelations included 50 never before seen cards each.

Included in this release was the first Action Pack, a 50 card pack of cards from the expansion that players would want more of for their decks. An acknowledgement that a flat distribution wouldn't fulfill the needs for some cards that would have been more common in the CCG model.

A second Kickstarter campaign in 2014 resulted in the release of the Coming Darkness block, consisting of the Queens Gambit, Knight's Passage, and Endgame sets. A second Action Pack was released in the same model as the previous one.

A third Kickstarter campaign occurred in 2015. It resulted in the release of the Year of the Goat starter expansion, with each of the six remaining factions receiving a pre-constructed starter.

== Story ==
The world of Shadowfist follows the background of the Feng Shui role playing game, where the art of Chinese geomancy, or Feng Shui, is real. Thus, control of this world does not depend on military might or political pull but on control of major Feng Shui sites. These are in-game locations that channel the greatest amount of Chi, the energy of life. Having more personal Chi than your opposition causes everything to go your way, statistically speaking. With enough Chi, characters can see and use portals to the Netherworld, an alternate dimension that connects the various junctions in time.

These characters are generally aligned with one of ten warring factions. Each game of Shadowfist represents one battle in this ‘secret war’. Each battle contributes to the story, since controlling enough sites in a past juncture would allow a faction to take control of the planet and dramatically alter all subsequent junctures. Of course, those who already control the past and the future are all trying to do the same.

== Gameplay ==
Players create a deck of cards (typically 40–80 total) and draw blind from a randomized stack, playing cards when possible and discarding unneeded cards. Card types include: Sites, Characters, Events, Edges and States. Sites are considered locations that stay in play permanently until removed or destroyed. Characters are used to attack and defend locations or other characters or generate effects and stay in play until 'smoked' or 'toasted', Events are played at any time and generate a specific effect and are then discarded. Edges are permanent cards that generate effects. States are played on other card in order to modify them or provide an additional effect.

The goal of Shadowfist is to accumulate five Feng Shui sites (or six in a two-player game). These can be played from a player's hand or taken from other players. However, in order to win the game, a player's final Feng Shui site must be taken from another player. Attacking and attacking to win the game are very different events during the game. The former might only draw a response from the defending player while the latter will certainly draw a response from all the other players in the game.

Players must meet both the power cost and resource requirements of a card to play it. Power represents a player's assets (money, firepower, chutzpah, etc.) and is primarily generated by players’ sites at the beginning of their turn. Resources represent either a faction's increasing involvement in the conflict or additional access to one of three talents (Tech, Magic, and Chi). Resources are typically provided by players’ characters. Spent power is taken from the player's power pool but resources remain available, even after characters are killed off in game.

Shadowfist uses a "last in, first out" or LIFO system for resolving effects. When an effect is generated by the playing of a card or from the rules text of a card in play, a new scene begins and players can generally respond with new effects. After the final new effect in the scene is generated, they begin to resolve beginning with the newest effect and ending with the oldest.

Shadowfist, released in 1995, differs from its CCG contemporaries in that focuses on multi-player gameplay rather than dueling. A key factor in Shadowfist gameplay is that players must team together to stop the player who is poised to win the game. All players can play cards that affect any other player's cards, even if they are not directly involved in attacking or being attacked. One of the most important skills in the game is judging when and how to use resources for defense against other players in lieu of attacking power. One of the other major differences between Shadowfist and other CCGs in multi-player is the fluidity of the game: players are rarely removed from the game and can often recover quickly from even the most crushing defeat.

== Set history ==
=== Initial sets ===
- 1995 – Release of the first Shadowfist 'Limited' set, with art direction by Jesper Myrfors. Consisted of randomly packed 60-card starter decks and 12-card booster packs the company referred to as shadowpacks. This set was printed by Upper Deck and boosters have fancy foil packaging. Included the original five factions: Architects, Ascended, Dragons, Hand, and Lotus, and a few cards from the Four Monarchs and Jammers. These cards bear a gold foil Ting Ting (a popular card from the Dragons faction) logo in the upper right hand corner.
- Late 1995 - Shadowfist 'Standard' set. Identical to the Limited run, except for certain Unique characters that were said to have "died" (though some copies of these cards made it into Standard boxes anyway). Cards from this set bear no foil stamp or other set logo. So many Limited and Standard cards were printed that they are relatively easy to find online today.
- 1996 – Netherworld. This booster-only set included cards from the first five factions and also fleshed out the Monarchs and Jammers, though they would remain the less well-rounded of the seven. These cards also bear the gold foil Ting Ting logo. Netherworld boxes are practically extinct.
- 1996 – Flashpoint. Another booster set, with a focus on the Architects and Dragons (though still including cards for all seven factions). Cards from this set bear a gold foil rifle logo. Flashpoint had a very annoying rarity distribution scheme and was the last expansion printed by Daedalus. Boxes of Flashpoint can still be found online with relative ease.
- 2000 – Year of the Dragon. This set marked the beginning of the Z-Man Games era and consisted of a brand new set of 50-card fixed starters, one for each of the original five factions. Many of these were Daedalus reprints but the starters also included quite a few new cards. YotD cards bear a white, non-foil, dragon's-head-in-profile logo.
- 2000 – Throne War. Booster-only. It was originally scheduled for an October 1996 release. Focused heavily on the Lotus, who got 1/4 of the cards in the set, bringing them into line with the power level of the other four original factions. Throne War cards bear a white pagoda logo.
- 2001 – Netherworld II: Back Through The Portals. This booster expansion focused on the Monarchs, who got 1/3 of the cards in the set. Despite this their power level would remain a bit below the other factions until later. N2 cards have a black-and-white vortex logo.
- 2001 – Shaolin Showdown. The cards in this booster expansion focused somewhat on the Ascended and Hand. This set generated some complaints about low power level, but still included quite a few important cards. SS cards have a white crossed-swords logo.
- 2002 – Dark Future. This booster expansion introduced the Purists as a new faction and also emphasized the Architects. Boxes of DF are now hard to find because they contain most of the foundation cards for the Purists; without foundations they are, of course, hard to play. Dark Future cards have a three-diamond logo that is white, gray, or black if the card is rare, uncommon, or common, respectively. (This rarity color-coding has continued in every booster expansion since.) This set was reprinted with the release of Critical Shift in July 2007.
- 2002 – Boom Chaka Laka. A small (91-card) booster expansion that generated some controversy based on its '70s theme. BCL had a very short print run. Cards from this expansion have a nunchuks logo.
- 2002 – 10,000 Bullets. A fixed 50-card starter expansion with one deck for each of the eight factions. 10kB cards have a row-of-bullets logo that is overlaid with the faction symbol of the deck it came from. There is no rarity coding since all the cards are fixed.
- 2003 – Red Wedding. Generally held to be the best booster expansion to date for reasons of playability, balance, and art. Naturally, RW sold out quickly; another, smaller run was reprinted in 2006. Red Wedding cards have a knife-through-the-heart logo.
- 2004 – Seven Masters vs. the Underworld. This booster expansion introduced the Seven Masters mini-faction, bringing the faction total to nine. 7M cards have a scroll logo. This release won the 2004 Origins award for best Collectible Card Game (2005). By popular demand, this set was re-released in 2011.
- 2004 – Two-Fisted Tales of the Secret War. Another 'themed' booster expansion, this time based on pulp fiction; gave fairly equal weight to the first eight factions. Last of the Z-Man Games expansions. 2FT cards have a 'dime' logo.
- 2006 – Shurikens & Six-Guns. This booster expansion is the first to be printed by Shadowfist Games. It, too, is themed, based on Westerns, and introduces the Syndicate faction. SSG cards have a US Marshal's badge logo.
- 2007 – Critical Shift. The second Shadowfist Games set's storyline focuses on the aftermath of the most recent Critical Shift. Both this set and the previous set were designed to be "draft-friendly" by including more Feng Shui sites and new foundation characters for most factions. The symbol for the set is a figure with arrows pointing to a parallel figure.
- 2009 – Empire of Evil. The final Shadowfist Games booster set. The storyline focuses on a bid for mastery by the new leadership of the Eaters of the Lotus by the way of an infernal marriage. The symbol is a standard with a crowned skull.
- 2013 – Combat in Kowloon. This first original release from Inner Kingdom Games (IKG) transitions the game from a CCG to a customizable, non-collectible format (Dynamic Card Game). It features a starter deck of 50 cards for each of four factions, the Ascended, the Dragons, the Eaters of the Lotus and the Guiding Hand. The set symbol is an eight-sided feng shui mirror.
- 2013 – Back for Seconds. This second release by IKG features two expansion decks for Combat in Kowloon. It introduces the Monarchs and the Jammers into the DCG format. This set features the same feng shui mirror for its symbol.
- 2013 – Reloaded - This third release by IKG is the first true expansion for the DCG format. It adds 50 new cards (including reprints) in a 50-card Shadowpack. This set has a pistol silhouette for its symbol.

=== Rebirth cycle ===
The storyline for this block features the departure of The Queen of the Darkness Pagoda from the faction "The Four Monarchs" and joining the faction, "The Eaters of the Lotus".

- 2013 – Reinforcements - This fourth release by IKG adds 50 all new cards in a 50 card Shadowpack. This set has a black-bordered shield with a red field and a white outline for its symbol.
- 2013 – Revelations - The fifth release by IKG adds 50 all new cards in a 50 card Shadowpack. This set has a seven petaled white lotus flower in profile outlined in black for its symbol.
- 2013 – Action Pack 1 - This 50 card set consists of reprints from the 2013 releases of cards that would normally fill the 'common' slot in a standard CCG release. The cards in this pack retain the symbol of the set in which they were originally released.

=== Coming Darkness cycle ===
The storyline follows a grand scheme by Ming I to supplant Xin Ji Yang on the Dragon Throne by setting a trap for her in the Modern Juncture.

- 2014 – Queens Gambit - This release is a set of 50 new cards. Its symbol is a black queen chess piece within a grey circle.
- 2014 – Knight's Passage - This release is a set of 50 new cards. Its symbol is a black knight chess piece within a grey circle.
- 2014 – Endgame - This release is a set of 50 new cards. Its symbol is a black rook (castle) chess piece within a grey circle.
- 2014 – Action Pack 2 - This 50 card set consists of reprints from the Coming Darkness Cycle in the same fashion as the 2013 Action Pack. The cards retain their original set symbol.
- 2015 – Year of the Goat - This set consists of 6 faction-specific decks of 55 cards each with a total of 157 new cards. The symbol for this set is a hand-drawn goat face, the color matching the faction color to easily identify which deck it came from.

=== Upcoming sets ===
Continuing with the Dynamic Card Game (DCG) model, Inner Kingdom Games is settling into a pattern of a Starter set block, followed by two expansion blocks of three decks each. The first expansion after the Year of the Goat expansion is under the working title of "A Better Tomorrow" and will focus on the newly reopened Future juncture.

== Storyline ==
Each set has some back-story involved, which often is shown via the card names and their flavor text (the italicized non-rules text on the cards). There is often fiction posted which fleshes out the story.

- Limited/Standard: The major plot involved the Ascended's Operation Killdeer which led to the deaths of Adrienne Hart, Jack Donovan, Mad Dog McCroun, Jueding Shelun, and the Thing with 1000 Tongues (a disgusting demon). Collateral damage in the meleé were Sun Chen and Nirmal Yadav. Iala Mané, another combatant was presumed dead.
- Netherworld: Following up to the story in Limited, the action takes place around the alliance of the Monarchs, Ascended and Jammers leading to the creation (and otherwise destruction of) the Molten Heart.
- Flashpoint: The plotline centered around the Architects of the Flesh creation of the Arcanotower, an organic structure which was seeded in modern-day South America which, when fully grown will create a Critical Shift.
- To this point... Starting with the storyline of Critical Shift and following through Empire of Evil, the doomsday prophecy of the Syndicate came true. No one's sure what happened, but the end result is the closing of the portals to the 2063 juncture. This leaves the future(!) of the Architects of the Flesh, Purists and Syndicate up in the air.
- Combat in Kowloon/Back for Seconds: The fiction for this set is in review at this time.

== Reception ==
Andy Butcher reviewed Shadowfist for Arcane magazine, rating it an 8 out of 10 overall. Butcher comments that "In all,Shadowfist is an impressive achievement. It's not only a superb card game, but it's also a great introduction to a new and imaginative game world."

Pyramid magazine reviewed Shadowfist for and stated that "if a card game's going to be a hit, it has to have something special going for it. Shadowfist is one of those games."

Andy Butcher reviewed the Netherworld expansion set for Shadowfist for Arcane magazine, rating it an 8 out of 10 overall. Faragher comments that "As with all expansion sets, Netherworld increases the complexity of the game, but otherwise there's precious little to criticise. Shadowfist was one of the best card games to be released last year, and Netherworld just makes it even better."

Ken St. Andre comments: "A game of Shadowfist is more than card against card. It's guile against guile. And don't we all want to be the mastermind who controls both Time and Fortune?"

== Reviews ==
- Australian Realms #25
- Realms of Fantasy
