= Cartoon Action Hour =

Role-playing game

- Cartoon Action Hour cover
- Designers: Cynthia Celeste Miller, Eddy Webb
- Publishers: Spectrum Games
- Publication: 2002
- Genres: Super Heroes, Cartoon
- Systems: Custom

Cartoon Action Hour is a role-playing game (RPG) designed to emulate classic action-adventure cartoons, such as ThunderCats, He-Man, Transformers, G.I. Joe, Visionaries, Inhumanoids, Centurions, Thundarr the Barbarian, M.A.S.K., and Bravestarr.

It was e-published by Spectrum Games as a PDF role-playing game in early 2002, where it garnered a sizable cult following. This prompted Z-Man Games to offer to publish the game as a hardcopy edition. The material from the PDF was revised and expanded upon for the 2003 print version.

== Season 1 ==
Cartoon Action Hour implements a relatively simple ruleset. The core resolution system revolves around rolling a d12, adding a number to it, and comparing it to a Difficulty Number. If the result equals or exceeds that Difficulty Number, the character succeeds in the task at hand.

=== Traits ===
Whereas most RPGs give all characters an identical list of attributes (such as Strength, Agility, Intelligence, etc.) and a variable collection of skills, Cartoon Action Hour rolls them all into one type of statistic known as Traits. Each character will have a different list of Traits, with ratings ranging from −4 (nearly non-existent) to 4 (maximum human capability), with 0 being average.

==== Super-Ratings ====
To represent Traits with superhuman or supernatural levels of ability, the designers use super-ratings. Characters with a Trait rating of 4 may have another number in parentheses, ranging from 2 to 5. This super-rating allows the player to roll more than one d12 when testing that Trait, taking the best result.

=== Special Abilities ===
Superpowers, magic spells, vehicles, weapons, armor, racial abilities, animal companions, psionic abilities, and magic artifacts—They can all be created using the Special Ability creation rules. Each Special Ability is designed by picking and choosing appropriate "components" that define it. For example, an energy blast would need the following components: Damage Rating and Range. This can easily be customized further by adding other components and modifiers, thus making the Special Ability truly unique.

=== Reflecting the Genre ===
Every facet of Cartoon Action Hour was created with an eye toward faithfully depicting the subject matter, using what the authors refer to as "cartoon logic". A few examples of this are as follows:

- Characters cannot be killed. Rather, they just go "Out of the Fight" (or OOF) for the remainder of the combat scene. Characters can die in a "Movie" episode, however, even there character deaths are not common.
- Huge weapons (such as bazookas, rocket launchers, etc.) deal more damage to vehicles than to characters. In the cartoons, such weapons tend to blow vehicles to smithereens, but when it comes to characters, these weapons usually just hit near them and the impact from the explosion merely sends them flying into a wall. Again, cartoon logic.
- Characters receive experience for participating in After-Show Messages ("... And Knowing is half the battle!").
- The rules institute a quick and entertaining way for characters to fight those swarms of nameless henchmen (such as Cobra Vipers from GI Joe). These minion groups have a single score called Goon Factor, which acts as the Difficulty Number for fighting them. Success means that the character dispatches them (and the player gets to decide how—like pulling the carpet from under their feet, shooting the ceiling and thus trapping them beneath the resulting rubble, and so on). Failure means that the characters are overwhelmed and are captured.

== Reception ==
Reviewer Matthew Pook noted that "the look of Cartoon Action Hour belies its origins as an amateur publication. Its layout is overly cluttered and fussy, with its desktop publishing style readily apparent" and "there should be something to please anyone who is a fan of the genre within the pages of this book. Plus the rules and mechanics are nicely simple, making it easy to get into and play up to the epic heroism of Cartoon Action Hour".

== Reviews ==
- Backstab #49

== Season two ==
Season Two of Cartoon Action Hour was released on Oct 31, 2008 as a PDF on RPGNow.com. On December 16, 2008, the print version of the book was placed on Lulu. The rule book feature three series, Warriors of Cosmos (a science-fiction fantasy in the style of He-Man), Strikeforce Freedom (a G.I. Joe with Cobra being replaced by a spider-theme terrorist group) and Transbots (a "Transforming Robots" series in which the robots are built and work for rival companies.)

== Changes between Season 1 and Season 2 ==
- Character Points are replaced by Proof of Purchase Points.
- Players creates their character's Traits
- Hurt Points don't exist anymore. 'Setback Tokens' replaces these. Four 'Setback Tokens" and the character is defeated.
- Subplots are Season Two's Story Hooks, but with OOMPH instead of EXP.

== Season Three ==
Season Three of Cartoon Action Hour was released on Nov. 8, 2013.
