= Grave Robbers from Outer Space =

Card game

Grave Robbers From Outer Space
- Card Game
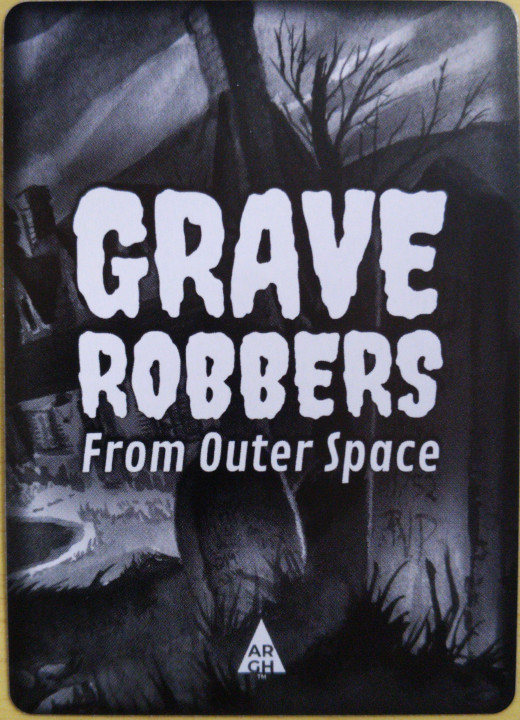
- The back of a GROS card
- Designer: Stephen Tassie; Steve Caruso; Nayla Caruso
- Publisher: The Academy of Resurrected Games & Holdings (ARGH); Z-Man Games (formerly)
- Release date: 2001; 25 years ago
- Type: Collectible; Dedicated (formerly)
- Players: 2 to 6
- Skills: Card playing; Basic arithmetic; Reading; Trope recognition
- Age range: 13+
- Chance: Some (order of cards drawn, varying card abilities)
- Website: graverobbersgame.com

Grave Robbers From Outer Space is an open source collectible card game originally designed by Stephen Tassie and currently published by Steve Caruso under the stewardship of The Academy of Resurrected Games and Holdings (ARGH).

GROS parodies movies and movie clichés, especially those from science fiction and horror movies. To that end, players in GROS take on the role of rival B-Movie directors, building up their films with Characters, Props, Locations, and Special Effects, while defending against Creature cards. The movie with the highest ratings when the game ends wins.

The original game was nominated for an Origins Award, and TVTropes.org wrote "Basically if someone made a card game based on this wiki, this would be it."

== Classic GROS ==
'Classic' GROS was originally published back in 2001 by Z-Man Games. The original format entailed players drawing from a communal deck of 120 cards that played out until someone played a "Roll the Credits" card or the deck ran dry.

Players could play Characters, Props, and Locations into their own Movie, each granting additional Defensive Strength (or DS), where they could play Creature cards against opponents' Movies that each had an Attack Strength (or AS). If a Creature could meet or beat a Movie's total Defense, the attacker could choose a Character in the defending Movie to die. Special Effect cards (or SFX) were an additional card type that could be played at any time.

Between 2001 and 2009, a total of 10 editions were published, roughly one per year:

- "Grave Robbers From Outer Space" (2001)
- "Grave Robbers II: Skippy's Revenge" (2002)
- "Cannibal Pygmies in the Jungle of Doom" (2002)
- "Kung Fu Samurai on Giant Robot Island" (2003)
- "Bell-Bottomed Badasses on the Mean Streets of Funk" (2004)
- "Berzerker Halflings From The Dungeon of Dragons" (2005)
- "Scurvy Musketeers of the Spanish Main" (2006)
- "Bushwhackin' Varmints Out of Sergio's Butte" (2007)
- "Silent But Deadly Night" (2008) - which came in a tin with a plush Skippy the Wonder Dog Christmas ornament, and
- "Grave Robbers III: Suburban Slashers from Sunnydale Street" (2009)

In 2011 the original GROS line went out of print.

== The Resurrected Edition ==
In 2015, Tassie attempted to re-publish the original game in a new Resurrected Edition format with a new resource management system (Popcorn) and re-tuned rules. However, the logistics did not work out – the largest of which being that the original art asset copyrights were owned by the original publisher.

== Director's Cut! and Subsequent Editions ==
In October 2023, after a successful crowdfunding campaign, Grave Robbers From Outer Space: Director's Cut!, with the blessing of Steve Tassie, was published by Steve Caruso, officially bringing the game back into print with a number of notable rules and format changes:

- The physical dimensions of the cards have been changed to the "Euro poker" standard (63mm x 88mm) similar to games like Magic the Gathering and Pokémon.
- Players now construct their own individual Movie decks rather than drawing from a communal pile. If a player is new to the game, each major release is built from a number of 16-card "Feature Packs" based on a movie theme (Vampires, Mad Science, Aliens, etc.) any 2 or 3 of which can be shuffled together to create a deck to play.
- The Popcorn system from the unpublished Resurrected Edition was adopted and expanded upon. Each card has a "Popcorn cost" that can be paid by discarding cards from one's hand, or "tipping" cards already in play that bear a Popcorn Bucket icon.
- A new Plot Twist card type was introduced. These cards can only be played once per turn, face-down, and once certain in-game conditions are met their owner can call "Plot Twist!" and turn them over for additional effects, Popcorn production, and the ability to bank points towards the final score. They are used to end the game in short-form "Episode" play.
- Roll the Credits cards are the game-ending mechanic in the new Standard "Feature Film" play. Once a single player's movie makes it to at least 20 defense, they may play a Roll the Credits which prompts a "Climax" final panic round similar to the original game.

The new series of Grave Robbers From Outer Space currently consists of:

- Grave Robbers From Outer Space: Director's Cut! (2023)
- The Cast & Crew Expansion (2024)
- Bleeding in the New Year (2024)
- Cannibal Pygmies in the Jungle of Doom: Director's Cut! (2024)
- The Cast & Crew Expansion 2 (2024)
- An American Werewolf in Trouble (2026)
- The Cast & Crew Expansion 3 (2026)
- Things That Go Bite in the Night (2026)

And additional releases are already planned.

== Reviews ==
- Rue Morgue #24
