= Feng Shui (role-playing game) =

Tabletop role-playing game by Robin Laws

- Feng Shui role-playing game cover, Atlas edition
- Designers: Robin Laws
- Publishers: Daedalus Entertainment, Atlas Games
- Publication: 1996 (Daedalus); 1999 (Atlas Games); 2015 (Second Edition)
- Genres: Hong Kong martial arts action movie
- Systems: Custom, with emphasis on quick combat

Feng Shui is a martial arts-themed role-playing game, designed by Robin Laws, published first by Daedalus Entertainment and now by Atlas Games. The game shares its setting with the collectible card game Shadowfist. The system is simple, with most detail being in the game's combat system. Combat is made to flow quickly, moving from one action scene to another very quickly. It was inspired and based on Hong Kong style action movies. The characters begin at a high level of skill, as appropriate for protagonists in the source films.

After a successful Kickstarter, Atlas Games released a Second Edition of Feng Shui in late 2015, on the eve of the game's 20th anniversary of publication.

== Overview ==
The name Feng Shui refers to one of the central themes of the game: those who control places with powerful Feng Shui control the world. These people find that events go in their favour more often than would be explained by chance. The outcomes of all major historical events, such as wars, elections and natural disasters are dictated by who has the most powerful Feng Shui. Numerous groups vie for control of these sites, and thus control of the world.

Feng Shui crosses genre boundaries and includes martial arts, firearms, magic and advanced technology.

One of the main features of the game is that the physical settings for scenes are meant to be vague, allowing the Game Master and the players room for creative improvisation and description of exciting stunts during combat.

== Rules ==
The rules are intended to be simple and easy to learn. There is one central mechanism for making skill checks. Non-combat checks are generally resolved with a single roll of the dice, whereas a scene involving combat can last half an hour or more.

=== Skills checks ===
For each skill a character has, they have an associated Action Value that states how good they are at that skill. When a skill is used, two six-sided dice are rolled. One, the positive die, is added to the Action Value. The other, the negative die, is subtracted from that sum. The final value is the Action Result which is then compared to the difficulty of the task being performed. If the Action Result is greater than or equal to the difficulty, that action succeeds. Because the average Action Result is equal to the Action Value, the difficulty can simply be the Action Value of an opponent.

=== Schticks ===
Characters also have schticks, or special abilities, which greatly enhance either their combat prowess or their usefulness out of combat. Some can be acquired by a character as they become more experienced, but some are unique to a particular character archetype (see below).

=== Character creation ===
A character will be created based on one of the pre-written archetypes in the game, each typifying a protagonist from a certain genre of action film, such as the Maverick Cop, the Martial Artist, the Journalist and the Big Bruiser. The archetype defines what the character is best at, and although character advancement is free-form after initial creation, it is usual to remain within the original archetype.

The character details are defined by attributes, skills, schticks and weapons.

- Characters have "primary attributes" which are divided into "secondary attributes". However, in many cases all the secondary attributes are the same as their associated primary to simplify book-keeping.
- "Skills" come as a skill bonus to be added to the appropriate secondary attribute, although after character creation only the final Action Value is important.
- The character may have one or more "schticks" as part of the archetype, and may be able to choose some more.
- "Weapons" appropriate to the character's style of fighting.

== Setting ==
The game has a rich cross-genre setting, shared with Shadowfist. However, the rules can be used in single-genre games without the elaborate background.

=== The Netherworld ===
In various parts of the world there are portals to a place called the Netherworld. The Netherworld is a shifting labyrinth of tunnels and caves that connects portals to a number of different time periods of human history. These are 69, 1850, 1996 and the dystopian future of 2056. These periods are known as junctures and travel between them is possible through the Netherworld. The Netherworld itself is populated by a wide variety of strange inhabitants who, for whatever reason, no longer have a place in any of the junctures. In the second edition the ancient juncture is now at 69 AD, and the dystopian future has become a post-apocalyptic one.

=== Superficial and Critical Shifts ===
A means to travel in time inevitably means that people will try to change the past or future. When this happens without a Feng Shui site changing ownership, this results in a superficial shift. Details change, but everything important remains the same. People may find themselves laterally reincarnated into a different name and job, but their memories will change to match their new identity. Whoever was in charge before is still in charge.

However, when there is a significant change in the flow of Chi as a result of Feng Shui sites changing hands, there might be a critical shift. Such a shift may make major changes to history and the balance of power. World War II may have ended with the Axis powers victorious, a large part of the world might have become a peaceful Confucian state, or the entire world might be recreated according to some terrible pattern. As with superficial shifts, people will be laterally reincarnated to fit the new world.

Anyone who has been to the Netherworld, however, does not get laterally reincarnated and will be acutely aware of the changes.

=== The Secret War ===
There are a number of factions fighting for control of the world across all four junctures. Their goal is to control enough sites with good Feng Shui to trigger a critical shift and remake the world in their favour. Because the average person is unaware of this, the ongoing struggle is known as the Secret War. Many of the factions have minions within their home junctures who are used to keep order there without knowing the truth behind it all. They also have powerful agents who are quite aware of the Netherworld and are active in other junctures. These agents are known as Innerwalkers or Secret Warriors - and the player characters number among them.

There are seven main factions:

- The Eaters of the Lotus are a group of evil eunuch sorcerers from the China of 69 AD. They rule Han-era China from behind a puppet emperor and wish to spread their power throughout the timestream. Their chief weapons are sorcery, demons, and political intrigue.
- The Guiding Hand is a group of neo-Confucian monks committed to bringing about a world of peace and harmony within strict rules. They abhor the Western powers and seek to stamp out all foreign influence from China, no matter how beneficial, and despise modern thinking and technology. Their stronghold is in 1850s China and is hotly contested with the Ascended. They specialize in kung fu.
- The Ascended are not truly human at all, but are the descendants of animals that became human through force of will. They abhor the magic that can turn them back into their primitive forms. They control the 1850 and 1996 junctures more-or-less totally, and prefer to use armies, police, criminal syndicates and their human secret warriors to do their dirty work in places intrinsically hostile to them. However, they are skilled in kung fu, guns and have abilities related to their animal heritage.
- The Architects of the Flesh rule 2056. Their world is one based on equality, fairness and good order but enforced brutally and without compassion. They simply wish to extend their dominion through time 'for the good of everyone'. Their most effective weapons are arcanowave devices, which they graft onto humans and captured demons from 69 regardless of the consequences, and which have bad effects on humans who overuse them.
- The Jammers are a psychotic group of anarchists composed mostly from deserters from the Architects and the subjects of their failed experiments on apes and monkeys. They want to wipe the world clean of all influences of Feng Shui at any cost, primarily by blowing every site they can find sky-high, regardless of who might get hurt or killed in the process. They principally use guns, heavy weapons, explosives and cyborg enhancements.
- The Four Monarchs once ruled the world until a critical shift engineered by the Ascended removed them from power. Each of them now rules a portion of the Netherworld, scheming against each other and the other factions. Each of them is a powerful sorcerer in his or her own right, and their followers specialize in either sorcery or kung fu.
- The Dragons are a loose set of idealistic warriors opposed to the tyranny of the other factions. It is to this group that the player characters will be inexorably drawn.

=== Hong Kong ===
For some reason, Hong Kong has a high concentration of both Feng Shui sites and Netherworld portals. It also has a history of being the place where the most significant battles in the Secret War take place.

== Books ==
Published by Daedalus Entertainment:

- Feng Shui (1st edition) 1996
- Marked For Death (scenario book) 1996
- Back For Seconds (player sourcebook) 1996
- Thorns of the Lotus (faction sourcebook)

Published by Ronin Publishing:

- Blood of the Valiant (faction sourcebook)

Published by Atlas Games:

- Feng Shui (Reprint) 1999
- Seed of the New Flesh (faction sourcebook) 1999
- Golden Comeback (player sourcebook) 2000
- Seal of the Wheel (faction sourcebook) 2000
- Elevator to the Netherworld (location sourcebook) 2000
- Four Bastards (scenario book) 2000
- In Your Face Again (scenario book) 2001
- On Location (GM screen) 2002
- Thorns of the Lotus (revised faction sourcebook) 2002
- Blood of the Valiant (revised faction sourcebook) 2003
- Gorilla Warfare (faction sourcebook) 2003
- Friends of the Dragon (player sourcebook) 2004
- Iron and Silk (player sourcebook) 2004
- Blowing Up Hong Kong (location sourcebook) 2004
- Glimpse of the Abyss (sourcebook) 2007
- Feng Shui 2 (Second Edition) 2015

Independent Material under Creative Commons License:

- Out for Blood (player sourcebook) 2010

== Reception ==
Andy Butcher reviewed Feng Shui for Arcane magazine, rating it a 9 out of 10 overall. Butcher comments that "Simply put, Feng Shui is brilliant."

Pyramid magazine reviewed Feng Shui and stated that "Well, I feel like most of the great things I was going to point out about Feng Shui - the new RPG on the block from the good folks at Daedalus - were said by John Tynes in the article we ran a few dozen pages back. But if you didn't get the message the first time, when we ran one of their pieces of art on our cover, or the second time, in the article, then let me say it right out: Feng Shui rocks."

Feng Shui was ranked 18th in the 1996 reader poll of Arcane magazine to determine the 50 most popular roleplaying games of all time. The UK magazine's editor Paul Pettengale commented: "In a word, brilliant. Feng Shui recreates the movies that inspired it with single-minded genius, and consequently is one of the most fast-moving, action-packed and enjoyable roleplaying games around. Players are actively encouraged to perform all manner of outrageous stunts and hair-brained schemes, and the rules deliberately ignore all of the traditional roleplaying game elements that have a tendency to slow things down. Hardly ever has there been a game that offers as much pure action, excitement, adventure and fun as Feng Shui."

In 1999 Pyramid magazine named Feng Shui on its list of "The Millennium's Best Role-playing Games". Editor Scott Haring said that "Feng Shui found the way to do over-the-top cinematic roleplaying without turning it into an exercise in dice rolling and power trips".

== Reviews ==
- Shadis #27 (May, 1996)

== Awards ==
In 2016, the new edition of Feng Shui, Feng Shui 2, won two gold ENnie Awards, for Best Rules and Best Setting, as well as a silver ENnie for Best Game
