= List of RuneQuest supplements =

This is a list of supplements for the RuneQuest role-playing game.

== RuneQuest first (1978), second (1979), and Classic (2016) editions ==
RuneQuest 1 & 2 products and edition by Chaosium:

- 4001 - RuneQuest 1 softcover Rulebook; Perrin, Steve; Turney, Ray & Friends (Henderson, Steve; James, Warren; editing and special sections: Sapienza, John & Stafford, Greg; Illustrations Perenne (Perrin), Luise; Map Sartar & Prax: Church, William) 120 pages, 1978.
- 4001 - RuneQuest 2 softcover Rulebook; Perrin, Steve; Turney, Ray & Friends (Henderson, Steve; James, Warren; editing and special sections: Sapienza, John & Stafford, Greg; Illustrations Perenne (Perrin), Luise; Map Sartar & Prax: Church, William) 120 pages, 1979.
- 4001-X - RuneQuest 2, Boxed; softcover Rulebook, Perrin, Steve; Turney, Ray & Friends (Henderson, Steve; James, Warren; editing and special sections: Sapienza, John & Stafford, Greg; Illustrations Perenne (Perrin), Luise; Map Sartar & Prax: Church, William) 120 pages,. Read This First 1 pages. Basic Role-playing, Stafford, Greg; Willis, Lynn; 16 pages. Apple Lane, scenario, Stafford, Greg; 32 pages. Fangs, Forthoffer, David; 16 pages. 8 pages of characters and monsters; 6 dice; 1980. Licensed edition published in the UK by Games Workshop
- 4001-H - RuneQuest 2 Hardcover Rulebook, Perrin, Steve; Turney, Ray & Friends (Henderson, Steve; James, Warren; editing and spécial sections: Sapienza, John & Stafford, Greg; Illustrations Perenne (Perrin), Luise; Map Sartar & Prax: Church, William) 120 pages, June 1982.
- 4002 - Balastor's Barracks; Henderson, Steve; James, Warren; Perrin, Steve; Illustrations Conrad, G.; 24 pages, 1978
- 4003 - Trolls and Trollkin; Turney, Ray; Illustrations Perenne (Perrin), Luise; 20 pages, 1978
- 4004 - Creatures of Chaos 1: Scorpion Men and Broos; Turney, Ray; Illustrations Perenne (Perrin), Luise; 20 pages, 1978
- 4005 - Apple Lane; Stafford, Greg (1978). Apple Lane. Illustrated by William Church. Albany, California, USA: Chaosium. ISBN 9781568825106. CHA4005. 32 pages.
- 4006 - Militia & Mercenaries; Turney, Ray; Illustrations Leialoha, Steve 'S.L.'; 16 pages, 1979
- 4007 - Snake Pipe Hollow, RuneQuest Adventures in Caverns of Chaos; Stafford, Greg; Kraft, Rudy; Illustration, Cover: Church, William; Interior Perenne (Perrin); February 1979 second edition Illustration, Cover Sullivan, Tom 1981, 48 pages.
- 4008 - Cults of Prax; Perrin, Steve; Stafford, Greg; Illustration: cover: Swenston, Steve; Interior: Church, William; Conrad, Guy; Day, Gene; Perenne (Perrin), Luise; Rune: Church, William; 112 pages, May 1979 (Licensed edition published in the UK by Games Workshop cover and Rune Church, William; January 1981).
- 4009 - Foes; 1200 Monsters of RuneQuest; Forthoffer, David; illustrations Becker, Richard; 112 pages, 1980
- 4010 - The Gateway Bestiary; Petersen, Sandy; Illustrations: Becker, Richard; 64 pages, June 1980
- 4011 - Plunder; Kraft, Rudy; Illustration: Becker, Richard; 48 pages, August 1980
- 4012 - Runemasters; Keyes, William R.; Illustrations Perenne (Perrin), Luise; 48 pages, August 1980
- 4013 - Griffin Mountain; Jaquays, Paul; Kraft, Rudy; Petersen, Sandy; Perrin, Steve; Stafford, Greg; Illustration Jaquays, Paul; 202 pages, May 1981 (Licensed edition published in the UK by Games Workshop).
- 4014 - Cults of Terror; Willis, Lynn; Stafford, Greg; Krank, Charlie; Kaufer, Ken; Swenson, Anders; Natzke, John; Petersen, Sandy; Summers, Sean; Jaquays, Paul; Kraft, Rudy; Illustration: Map: Krank, Charlie; Cover Painting: Jaquays, Paul; Interior: Jaquays, Paul; Becker, Richard; 96 pages, May 1981.
- 4015-X - Borderlands; Boxed; Boyle, John E.; Chodak, Yurek; Fiorito, Tony; Free, Lisa A.; Hoffman, Reid; Kirby, Janet; Kraft, Rudy; Perrin, Steve; Petersen, Sandy; Rolston, Ken; Stafford, Greg; Willis, Lynn; Wolcott, Elizabeth A.; Map: Chodak, Yurek; Church, William; Illustration: Free, Lisa A.; booklet: What's in the box (1 page); Common Knowledge for Players (4 pages); Referee's Handbook (48 pages); Referee's Encounter Book (32 pages); Map of the Raus Domain (22x17), Map of N. & S. River Cradles (11x34); Individual Scenario 1-7: 1 Scouting the Land (4 pages), 2 Outlaw Hunt (6 pages), 3 Jezra's Rescue (8 pages), 4 Revenge of Muriah (8 pages), 5 5-Eyes Temple (20 pages), 6 Condor Crags (6 pages), 7 To Giant Land! (8 pages); April 1982.
- 4016-X - Troll Pak; Boxed; Perrin, Steve; Petersen, Sandy; Stafford, Greg; Illustration: Cover: Dupont, Don; Interior: Free, Lisa A.; booklet: What's in the box (1 page ); Book One: Uz Lore (64 pages); Book Two: Book of Uz (48 pages); Book Three: Book of Adventures (64 pages); Player Handouts (8 pages); Munchrooms A (12 pages); Munchrooms B (6 pages); Map of Dagori Inkarth, July 1982.
- 4017 - SoloQuest; LaVergne, Alan; Illustration cover: Becker, Richard; pages 80, June 1982.
- 4018-X - Questworld; Boxed; Boyle, John E.; Florio, Mark; Goldberg, Ron; Harmon, Mark; Kirby, Janet; LaVergne, Alan; Stafford, Greg; Map: Krank, Charlie; Willis, Lynn; Illustration: Cover: Roland, Mark; Interior: Perenne (Perrin), Luise; booklet: What's in the box (1page); Introduction to Questworld (8 pages); Candlefire (40 pages); Lord Skyppen's Mansion (48 pages); Greenwald Tales (32 pages); Map of Kanos (17x22); Map of Greenwald region (17x22); August 1982.
- 4019 - SoloQuest 2: Scorpion Hall; LaVergne, Alan; Illustration, Cover: Becker, Richard; 96 pages, July 1982.
- 4020 - SoloQuest 3: The Snow King's Bride; LaVergne, Alan; Illustrations Perenne (Perrin), Luise; 48 pages, November 1982.
- 4021-X - Pavis: Threshold to Danger; Boxed; Dickinson, Oliver; Krank, Charlie; Perrin, Steve; Petersen, Sandy; Rolston, Ken; Stafford, Greg; Swenson, Anders; Trout, Michael; Willis, Lynn; Willner, M.B.; Map: Chodak, Yurek; Krank, Charlie; Willis, Lynn; Illustration: Cover: Blum, Michael; Foster, Brad W.; Interior: Blum, Michael; Foster, Brad W.; Perenne (Perrin), Luise; booklet: What's in the box (1 page); Common Knowledge for Players (40 pages); City Guide for the Gamemaster (40 pages); Map of New Pavis (17x22); Episodes for the Gamemaster (40 pages); Map of N. & S. River Cradles (11x34); 1983.
- 4022-X - Big Rubble: The Deadly City; Boxed; Perrin, Steve; Stafford, Greg et al.; booklet: What's in the box (1 page); Common Knowledge for Players (16 pages); Guide for the Gamemaster (32 pages); Episodes for the Gamemaster (96 pages); Map of Big Rubble (11x34); 1983.
- 4023 - RuneQuest Companion; Johnson, Bill; Kahn, Sherman; LaVergne, Alan; McCormick, Jim; Nance, Ron; Petersen, Sandy; Stafford, Greg; Cartes: Krank, Charlie; Illustration: Cover: Becker, Richard; Interior: Becker, Richard; Church, William; Day, Gene; Ramos, James Kevin; Swenston, Steve; 72 pages, 1983.
- 4500 - King of Sartar; Book by Stafford, Greg; 285 pages, 1992
- 4501 - Wyrms Footprints, Glorantha Legends and Lore by Stafford, Greg; Hargrave, David A.; Johnson, Bill; Krank, Charlie; Illustration: Cover: Barker, Dan; Interior: Church, William; Horsley, Ralph 'RCH'; Roland, Mark; Swenston, Steve; 112 pages, June 1995
- XXXX - The Sea Cave, scenario, Stafford, Greg; Illustrations Jaquays, Jennell; 24 pages, 1980 (published in 2016)

== Avalon Hill third edition ==
- AH857 - RuneQuest Fantasy Roleplaying Adventure, Deluxe Edition, Perrin, Steve; Stafford, Greg; Henderson, Steve; Willis, Lynn; Sandy, Petersen; Rolston, Ken; Krank, Charlie; Turney, Raymond (1984). RuneQuest (3 ed.). Baltimore, Maryland: Avalon Hill. ISBN 978-0911605518. AH857.

=== Boxed Supplements ===
The boxed supplements each contained a number (usually three) paper covered books.

- AH8573 - Monster Coliseum Avalon Hill: RuneQuest 3 (1985 Box)
- AH8574 - Adventurer Sheets: Human Avalon Hill: RuneQuest 3 (1985 Box)
- AH8575 - Adventurer Sheets: Nonhuman Avalon Hill: RuneQuest 3 (1985 Box)
- AH8576 - Vikings, Nordic Roleplaying for RuneQuest. Boxed set 4, Stafford, Greg; Petersen, Sandy (1985). Vikings, Nordic Roleplaying for RuneQuest. Baltimore, Maryland, USA: Avalon Hill. ASIN B000OU4U3E.
- AH8577 - Gods of Glorantha, 60 Religions for RuneQuest. boxed set 5, Stafford, Greg; Petersen, Sandy; Perrin, Steve; Krank, Charlie (1985). Gods of Glorantha. 60 Religions for RuneQuest. The Avalon Hill Game Company. ISBN 978-9990400878.
- AH8578 - Griffin Island Jaquays, Jennell; Kraft, Rudy; Stafford, Greg (1986). Griffin Island. Baltimore, Maryland, USA: Avalon Hill. Partial reworking of the Griffin Mountain book published for RQ2.
- AH8584 - Land of Ninja Charette, Bob; Petersen, Sandy (1987). Land of Ninja, 4th Volume. Avalon Hill. ISBN 978-1869893255.
- AH8585 - Glorantha: Genertela, Crucible of the Hero Wars Dunn, William; Stafford, Greg; Petersen, Sandy (1988). Glorantha: Genertela, Crucible of the Hero Wars. Baltimore, Maryland, USA: Avalon Hill.
- AH8586 - Trollpak (Second edition) Stafford, Greg; Petersen, Sandy (1988). Trollpak. Baltimore, Maryland, USA: Avalon Hill. Largely reprinting the RQ2 Trollpak box, but without the bulk of the adventures or cults, both of which would be spun off into separate products.
- AH8587 - Troll Gods Stafford, Greg; Petersen, Sandy (1989). Troll Gods. Baltimore, Maryland, USA: Avalon Hill. ISBN 1-56038-005-5. Mainly derived from RQ2 Tollpak, but with some new material.
- AH8588 - Elder Secrets of Glorantha Stafford, Greg; Petersen, Sandy (1989). Elder Secrets of Glorantha. Baltimore, Maryland, USA: Avalon Hill. ISBN 0-560-38006-2. Overview of non-human races of Glorantha. Derives some material from Trollpak, but much new content.

=== Softback books ===
The softback books were generally saddle stitched, though some were prefect bound. All had cardboard covers.

- AH85712 - Apple Lane Stafford, Greg (1987). Apple Lane. Baltimore, MD, USA: Avalon Hill. ISBN 0911605614. A reissue of the RQ2 adventure.
- AH85713 - Snake Pipe Hollow Kraft, Rudy; Stafford, Greg (1987). Snakepipe Hollow. Baltimore, MD, USA: Avalon Hill. ISBN 0911605622. A reissue of the RQ2 adventure.
- AH85711 - Gloranthan Bestiary Stafford, Greg; Petersen, Sandy (1988). Gloranthan Bestiary. Baltimore, Maryland, USA: Avalon Hill. ISBN 0-911605-60-6.
- AH85714 - RuneQuest Cities Abrams, Stephen; Everson, Jon (1988). RuneQuest Cities. Baltimore, MD, USA: Avalon Hill.
- AH85715 - Into the Troll Realms, Troll Adventures and Encounters for RuneQuest, Stafford, Greg; Petersen, Sandy (1988). Into the Troll Realms, Troll Adventures and Encounters for RuneQuest. Baltimore, Maryland, USA: Avalon Hill. ISBN 0-911605-78-9. A reprint of the shorter adventures contained in the first edition Trollpak box.
- AH85716 - The Haunted Ruins Stafford, Greg; Petersen, Sandy; Willis, Lynn; Blayo, Frederic; Monroe, John B. (1989). The Haunted Ruins. Baltimore, Maryland, USA: Avalon Hill. ISBN 1-56038-014-4. A reprint of a longer adventure from the first edition of Trollpak.
- AH85717 - Daughters of Darkness and the Chronicles of Santon Hickie, Tony; Innes, Robert (1990). Daughters of Darkness and the Chronicles of Santon. Baltimore, Maryland, USA: Avalon Hill. ISBN 1-56038-026-8., Adventures in an original setting.
- AH8589 - Eldarad: The Lost City, Watson, Chris (1990). Eldarad: The Lost City. Baltimore, MD, USA: Avalon Hill. ISBN 9781560380207. An original adventure setting.
- AH8590 - Sun County O'Brien, Michael (1992). Sun County. Baltimore, MD, USA: Avalon Hill. ISBN 1-56038-050-0.
- AH8591 - River of Cradles Stafford, Greg; Petersen, Sandy; Bankert, Troy; Boyle, John E.; Krank, Charlie; Perrin, Steve; Rolston, Ken; Willis, Lynn; Willner, Marc; Wolcott, Elizabeth (1992). River of Cradles. Baltimore, Maryland, USA: Avalon Hill. ISBN 1-56038-050-0. A mix of new material and work taken from the RQ2 Pavis and Big Rubble boxes.
- AH8592 - Dorastor: Land of Doom, Stafford, Greg; Petersen, Sandy; Rolston, Ken (1993). Dorastor, Land of Doom. Baltimore, Maryland, USA: Avalon Hill. ISBN 1560380748.
- AH8594 - Shadows on the Borderland Stafford, Greg; Petersen, Sandy; Crimm, Martin; Dawson, Michael; Jaquays, Jennell; Quaife, Jon; Rolston, Ken (1993). Shadows on the Borderland. Baltimore, Maryland, USA: Avalon Hill. ISBN 1-56038-062-4.
- AH8593 - Strangers in Prax O'Brien, Michael; Dawson, Michael; Tweet, Jonathan (1994). Strangers in Prax. Baltimore, MD, USA: Avalon Hill. ISBN 1-56038-082-9.
- AH8595 - Lords of Terror Stafford, Greg; Petersen, Sandy; Martin, Stephen (1994). Lords of Terror. Baltimore, Maryland, USA: Avalon Hill. ISBN 1560380845. Draws from and expands the RQ2 book Cults of Terror.

== Games Workshop third edition ==
The Games Workshop supplements were hardback books converted from the Avalon Hill boxed sets.

- GW4616 - Runequest Fantasy Roleplaying Adventure, 1st Volume Perrin, Steve; James, Warren; Stafford, Greg; Willis, Lynn; Petersen, Sandy; Henderson, Steve (1987). Runequest Fantasy Roleplaying Adventure, 1st Volume (3rd ed.). England, UK. 4616.
- GW4628 - Advanced Runequest, 2nd Volume Perrin, Steve; James, Warren; Stafford, Greg; Willis, Lynn; Petersen, Sandy; Henderson, Steve (1987). Advanced Runequest, 2nd Volume (3rd ed.). England, UK. ISBN 1-869893-09-3. 4628.
- GW4667 - RuneQuest Monsters, 3rd Volume Perrin, Steve; James, Warren; Stafford, Greg; Willis, Lynn; Petersen, Sandy; Henderson, Steve (1987). RuneQuest Monsters, 3rd Volume (3rd ed.). England, UK. ISBN 1-869893-12-3. 4667.
- GW4655 - Land of Ninja, 4th Volume Charette, Bob; Petersen, Sandy (1987). Land of Ninja, 4th Volume (3rd ed.). ISBN 978-1869893255. 4655. Reprint of the Avalon Hill boxed set.
- GW4630 - Griffin Island, 3rd Volume Kraft, Rudy; Jaquays, Paul; Stafford, Greg; Petersen, Sandy (1987). Griffin Island, 5th Volume (3rd ed.). England, UK. ISBN 1-869893-32-8. 4630.

== Mongoose RuneQuest 4th and 5th Editions ==
There were an extensive number of MRQ supplements, generally published as hardback books. The bulk are set in the second age of Glorantha.

RuneQuest 4th edition, Mongoose 1st edition
Code	Title	Published	Author	Setting	Notes
MGP8100	Runequest Rulebook	2006	Matthew Sprange		
MGP8101	Glorantha, The Second Age	2006	Robin D Laws	Glorantha	
MGP8102	Games Master's Screen	2006	None given	Generic	
MGP8103	RuneQuest Monsters	2006	Richard Ford & Greg Lynch	Generic	
MGP8104	RuneQuest Companion	2006	Greg Lynch, Kenneth Hite & Ian Belcher	Generic	
MGP8105	Cults of Glorantha Volume 1	2006	Jeff Kye	Glorantha	
MGP8106	Legendary Heroes	2006	Aaron Dembski-Bowden, Richard Ford, Bryan Steele	Generic	
MGP8107	Magic of Glorantha	2006	Aaron Dembski-Bowden	Glorantha	
MGP8108	Arms & Equipment	2006	Bryan Steele	Generic	
MGP8109	Player's Guide to Glorantha	2006	Bryan Steele	Glorantha	
MGP8110	Fritz Leiber's Lankhmar	2006	Aaron Dembski-Bowden	Lankhmar	
MGP8111	Rune of Chaos	2006	Bryan Steele	Generic	
MGP8112	Trolls - A Guide to the Uz	2007	Aaron Dembski-Bowden	Glorantha	
MGP8115	The Clanking City	2007	Aaron Dembski-Bowden	Glorantha	
MGP8116	Elric of Melniboné	2007	Lawrence Whitaker	Elric of Melniboné	
MGP8120	Cults of Glorantha Volume 2	2006	Jeff Kyer & Robin D Laws	Glorantha	
MGP8123	Jrustela	2007	Gareth Hanrahan	Glorantha	
MGP8124	Dragonewts - A Guide to the Eravssarr	2007	Lawrence Whitaker	Glorantha	
MGP8128	Blood of Orlanth	2007	Gareth Hanrahan	Glorantha	
MGP8129	Dara Happa Stirs	2008	Lawrence Whitaker	Glorantha	
MGP8130	Elfs - A Guide to the Aldryami	2007	Shannon Appelcline	Glorantha	
MGP8134	Games Master's Handbook	2008	Lawrence Whitaker	Generic	
MGP8137	Land of Samurai	2008	Lawrence Whitaker	Mythic Earth	
MGP8138	RuneQuest Spellbook	2007	Bryan Steele	Generic	
MGP8139	RuneQuest Character Pack	2007		Generic	
MGP8141	Pirates	2007	Gareth Hanrahan	Mythic Earth	
MGP8146	Magic of the Young Kingdoms	2007	Lawrence Whitaker	Elric of Melniboné	
MGP8148	Dwarfs - A Guide to the Mostali	2009	Lawrence Whitaker	Glorantha	
MGP8149	Ruins of Glorantha	2008	Joshua Cole	Glorantha	
MGP8150	Elric of Melniboné Companion	2007	Lawrence Whitaker	Elric of Melniboné	
MGP8151	Cults of the Young Kingdoms	2008	Lawrence Whitaker	Elric of Melniboné	
MGP8154	Elric of Melniboné: Dream Realms	2009	Joshua Cole	Elric of Melniboné	
MGP8155	Fronela	2009	Lawrence Whitaker	Glorantha	
MGP8156	Ducks - A Guide to the Durulz	2008	Bryan Steele	Glorantha	
MGP8159	Ralios	2006	Robin D Laws	Glorantha	
MGP8165	Lankhmar Unleashed	2009	Simon Beal, Aaron Dembski-Bowden	Lankhmar	

RuneQuest 5th edition, Mongoose 2nd edition
Code	Title	Published	Author	Setting	Notes
MGP8170	RuneQuest II Core Rulebook	2010	Lawrence Whitaker and Pete Nash		
MGP8172	Pavis Rises	2010	Lawrence Whitaker	Glorantha	
MGP8175	Cults of Glorantha	2010	Lawrence Whitaker	Glorantha	
MGP8176	Races of Glorantha, volume 1	2010	Aaron Dembski-Bowden, Bryan Steele, Lawrence Whitaker, Pete Nash	Glorantha	
MGP8177	Arms & Equipment	2010	Bryan Steele and Lawrence Whitaker	Generic	
MGP8178	Monster Coliseum	2010	Lawrence Whitaker	Generic	
MGP8180	Glorantha The Second Age Core Rulebook	2010	Robin Laws, Bryan Steele and Lawrence Whitaker	Glorantha	
MGP8182	Necromantic Arts	2010	Gareth Hanrahan and Simon Beal	Generic	
MGP8184	Empires	2010	Lawrence Whitaker	Generic	
MGP8185	Deus Vult	2010	Gareth Hanrahan	Mythic Earth	
MGP8188	Ex Cathedra	2010	Gareth Hanrahan	Mythic Earth, Adventures for Deus Vult	
MGP8191	The Abiding Book	2010	Lawrence Whitaker	Glorantha	
MGP8196	Elric of Melniboné	2010	Lawrence Whitaker, Pete Nash	Elric of Melniboné	
MGP8199	Vikings	2010	Pete Nash	Mythic Earth	
MGP8201	Cults of the Young Kingdoms	2010	Lawrence Whitaker, Pete Nash	Elric of Melniboné	
MGP8211	Cities of the Young Kingdoms: The South	2011	Lawrence Whitaker	Elric of Melniboné	

== The Design Mechanism RuneQuest 6th edition ==
In 2012, RuneQuest 6th edition was written and published by The Design Mechanism. In 2015, the RuneQuest licence reverted to Chaosium. Also in 2016, RuneQuest 6 was re-branded and re-published by The Design Mechanism as Mythras. RuneQuest 6th edition and its supplements are available as Mythras editions after 2016.

RuneQuest 6th Edition, The Design Mechanism
Code	Title	Published	Author	Setting	Notes
TDM100S	RuneQuest 6	2012	Lawrence Whitaker and Pete Nash	Generic	
	Firearms	2012	Lawrence Whitaker and Pete Nash	Generic	
TDM101	Book of Quests	2013	Darren Driver, Tom Griffith, Russell Hoyle, Bruce Mason, Keane Peterson, Marko Vojnovic, Jonathan Webb, John White, and Lawrence Whitaker	The Realm	
TDM102	Monster Island	2013	Pete Nash & Friends	Sword & Sorcery	
TDM103	Ships & Shield Walls	2014	Jonathan Drake, Pete Nash and Lawrence Whitaker	Generic	
TDM200	Mythic Britain	2014	Lawrence Whitaker	Roleplaying in Dark Ages Britain	
TDM300	Shores of Korantia	2014	Jonathan Drake & Friends	Thennla	
TDM400	Luther Arkwright	2015	Chad Bowser, Pete Nash, Bryan Steele and Lawrence Whitaker	Roleplaying Across the Parallels. Luther Arkwright Created by Bryan Talbot	

== RuneQuest: Roleplaying in Glorantha ==
4th Edition Chaosium RuneQuest, Chaosium
Code	Title	Published	Authors	ISBN	Notes
4025	The Guide to Glorantha	2014	Greg Stafford, Jeff Richard, Sandy Petersen	9780977785377	
4027	RuneQuest: Roleplaying in Glorantha Quickstart	2017	Jason Durall, Jeff Richard	978-1-56882-450-5	
4028	RuneQuest - Roleplaying in Glorantha	2018-09-18	Greg Stafford, Jeff Richard, Jason Durall, Steve Perrin	978-1-56882-502-1	
4029	RuneQuest: Gamemaster Screen Pack	2019	Greg Stafford, Jeff Richard, Jason Durall	978-1-56882-504-5	
4032	RuneQuest: Glorantha Bestiary	2019	Greg Stafford, Jeff Richard, Jason Durall, Sandy Petersen	978-1-56882-503-8	
4033	The Glorantha Sourcebook	2018	Greg Stafford, Jeff Richard, Michael O'Brien, Sandy Petersen	978-1-156882-501-4	
4034	The Red Book of Magic	2021	Jeff Richard, Greg Stafford, Steve Perrin, Sandy Petersen	978-1-56882-523-6	
4035	RuneQuest Starter Set	2021	Greg Stafford, Jeff Richard, Jason Durall	978-1-56882-524-3	
4036	RuneQuest - Weapons and Equipment	2021	Richard August, Jason Durall, Martin Helsdon, Eric McGuire, Diana Probst, Jude Reid, Jeff Richard, Jared Twing, Dom Twist	978-1-56882-525-0	
4037	Lands of RuneQuest: Dragon Pass	2024	Greg Stafford, Jeff Richard	978-1-56882-527-4	
4038	The Pegasus Plateau & Other Stories	2020	Jason Brick, Rachael Cruz, Steffie de Vaan, Jason Durall, Helena Nash, Steve Perrin, Diana Probst, Jeff Richard, Dom Twist, John Wick	978-1-56882-507-6	
4039	The Smoking Ruin & Other Stories	2021-01-24	Christopher Klug, Steve Perrin, Jeff Richard, Greg Stafford, Jason Durall	978-1-56882-506-9	
4040	Lands of RuneQuest: Sartar	2026	Jeff Richard, Greg Stafford	978-1-56882-622-6	
4041	Cults of RuneQuest: Mythology	2023	Greg Stafford, Jeff Richard	978-1-56882-465-9	
4042	Cults of RuneQuest: The Prosopaedia	2023	Greg Stafford, Jeff Richard, Sandy Petersen, Katrin Dirim	978-1-56882-466-6	
4043	Cults of RuneQuest: The Lightbringers	2023	Greg Stafford, Jeff Richard	978-1-56882-467-3	
4044	Cults of RuneQuest: The Earth Goddesses	2023	Greg Stafford, Jeff Richard	978-1-56882-468-0	
4045	Cults of RuneQuest: The Lunar Way	2024	Greg Stafford, Jeff Richard	978-1-56882-474-1	
4046	RuneQuest: The Glorantha Sourcebook 2nd Edition	2024	Greg Stafford, Jeff Richard, Michael O'Brien, Sandy Petersen	978-1-56882-526-7	
4047	Cults of RuneQuest: The Gods of Fire and Sky	2025	Greg Stafford, Jeff Richard	978-1-56882-496-3	
4055	The Hunt for the Storm Calf	2025	David Naylor, James Coquillat	N/A	
4056	Stealing the Eye	2026	Todd Gardiner, Mark Morrison	N/A	
4060	A Darkness at Runegate	2026	Richard August, Jason Durall, Jeff Richard	N/A	

Supplements for RQG are generally hardcover books and PDFs.

In addition to the official books listed above there is an active fan publishing scheme known as the Jonstown Compendium and published through DriveThruRPG. By March 2022 there were over 200 such publications, some of which were available as Print On Demand hard copies.

The Battle of Dangerford (2021) is a solo adventure from RuneQuest Starter Set, that was also published online and available for free.

== Books by third party publishers ==
=== Games Workshop ===
- RuneQuest Character Sheets (1982)

=== Judges Guild ===
- Broken Tree Inn
- City of Lei Tabor
- Duck Pond
- Hellpits of Nightfang
- Legendary Duck Tower
- RuneQuest Judges Shield (1980)
