= RuneQuest Monsters =

Role-playing game supplement

- Cover art by David Gallagher, 1987
- Designers: Steve Perrin; Greg Stafford; Steve Henderson; Lynn Willis; Charlie Krank; Ray Turney; Ken Rolston; Sandy Petersen
- Publishers: Games Workshop
- Publication: 1987
- Genres: Fantasy
- Systems: Basic Role-Playing

RuneQuest Monsters is a game supplement published by Games Workshop in 1987 for the fantasy role-playing game RuneQuest.

== Contents ==
RuneQuest Monsters is a bestiary of 90 creatures and monsters for use with the third edition of RuneQuest published by Avalon Hill. Entries include mundane creatures (dog, deer), carnivores (tiger, bear), creatures of fantasy (griffin, harpy), dinosaurs, and literary creations (jabberwock). There are also a number of human non-player characters listed.

== Publication history ==
Chaosium originally published Runequest in 1978, and quickly followed this with a second edition the following year. In an attempt to increase distribution and marketing of Runequest, Chaosium made a deal with Avalon Hill in 1984 to publish the third edition of RuneQuest.

During this period, Games Workshop made a number of licensed supplements, RuneQuest Monsters being one, a 112-page hardcover book written by Steve Perrin, Greg Stafford, Steve Henderson, Lynn Willis, Charlie Krank, Ray Turney, Ken Rolston, and Sandy Petersen, with a cover by David Gallagher, and published by Games Workshop in 1987.

== Reception ==
Paul Cockburn reviewed RuneQuest Monsters for White Dwarf #93, and stated that "the book doubles up both as a useful long-term reference tool, and as an immediately useable game aid."

In Issue 5 of The Games Machine, John Woods reviewed three 3rd edition Runequest books — the RuneQuest rulebook, Advanced RuneQuest, and RuneQuest Monsters — and found Monsters to be "the poorest value of the three, with the text being thinned out by over-generous illustrations." Woods concluded with a recommendation to not buy this book, saying, "It is quite possible to get by without it, though - the selection of creatures in the [RuneQuest rulebook] is sufficient to get started and to give referees enough examples to invent their own monsters."
