= Gods of Glorantha =

Fantasy tabletop role-playing game supplement

60 Religions for RuneQuest
- Cover illustration by Tom Sullivan.
- Designers: Greg Stafford; Sandy Petersen; Steve Perrin; Charlie Krank
- Publishers: Avalon Hill
- Publication: 1985; 41 years ago
- Genres: Fantasy
- Systems: Basic Role-Playing

Gods of Glorantha, subtitled "60 Religions for RuneQuest", is a boxed supplement published under license by Avalon Hill in 1985 for Chaosium's fantasy role-playing game RuneQuest. The fifth of their boxed supplements for RuneQuest, it provides information and game rules related to sixty fictional cults, and was the first to feature the world of Glorantha instead of the default setting of "Dark Ages of fantasy Europe". The supplement was designed by Chaosium staff writers Sandy Petersen, Greg Stafford, Steve Perrin and Charlie Krank. It received positive reviews in game periodicals including Casus Belli, Different Worlds, Dragon, and The Games Machine.

== Contents ==
Gods of Glorantha is a supplement that details sixty RuneQuest cults for the fantasy world of Glorantha. In addition to descriptions of thirteen pantheons and their related cults, the contents include new spells and skills, a calendar of religious festivals and significant dates, major outlooks on life from the points-of-view of seven major religions, and a listing of Gloranthan deities. The boxed set includes:

- "Cults", an 84-page book, details sixty cults, giving information on the worship of each pantheon and they ways they interact. Its first 22 pages consist of a long chapter on the religions of Glorantha and how these mythologies connect to the history of the world. This book also includes a map of the world, a description of 13 important pantheons with maps showing their distribution throughout the world. The book includes a comprehensive index of spells and skills specific to each religion.
- "What the Priests Say" is a 24-page book including a survey with entries of more than 250 deities. It displays a legend saying "Read Me First" and lists an inventory of components found in the set. It includes nine writeups of two-to-three pages each which detail some of the significant religions and each includes the basic information known by a new adherent to that religion. As a guide for players, this information is presented as a series of responses to questions about each religion. In this book, a member of each of the sixty main cults offers their view of Creation, life and death, and a rationale for their religion.
- "Prospaedia", a 20-page "Who's Who" book and contains short entries on nearly 300 gods. It lists the major Gloranthan deities in alphabetical order, and includes a physical description, imagery, runes and where they are found
- "Gloranthan Calendar", a 12-page book that lists the high holy days of each cult by month. It is illustrated and can be hung on a wall.

== Publication history ==
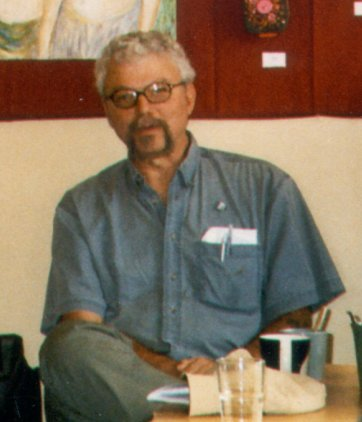
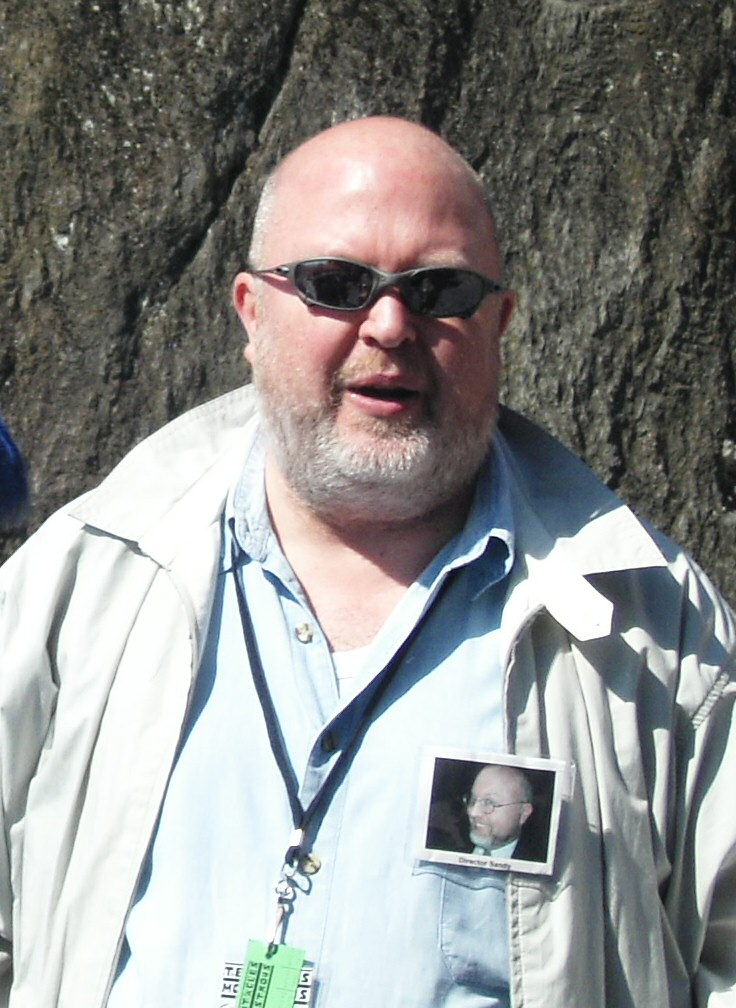
The book's designers included Greg Stafford and Sandy Petersen.

Chaosium originally published Runequest in 1978, and quickly followed this with a second edition the following year. In an attempt to increase distribution and marketing of Runequest, Chaosium made a deal with Avalon Hill in 1984 to publish the third edition of RuneQuest. Under the agreement, Avalon Hill took ownership of the trademark for RuneQuest, but Chaosium did not include the setting of Glorantha in the license unless the content was either created or approved by Chaosium staff. If Chaosium did not supply Glorantha material, Avalon Hill used a generic setting called the "Dark Ages of Fantasy Europe" (although a slim booklet called "Introduction to Glorantha" was included in Avalon Hill's edition of Runequest.) In keeping with this policy, The Gods of Glorantha was published by Avalon Hill in 1985 but was created by Chaosium staff (written by Sandy Petersen, Greg Stafford, Steve Perrin and Charlie Krank, with artwork by Tom Sullivan). Shannon Appelcline explained that in the five years that the deal between Chaosium and Avalon Hill was in effect, Chaosium "acted as creators of RuneQuest material" and largely ignored the Glorantha setting, apart from the singular Gods of Glorantha. Appelcline further described this relationship between the two companies: "Though Chaosium initially set new RuneQuest material in "Fantasy Earth," they quickly moved back to Glorantha, publishing classics like Gods of Glorantha (1985), Glorantha (1988), and Elder Secrets of Glorantha (1989). Unfortunately, the relationship between the two companies frayed entirely in 1989. Chaosium ceased working with Avalon Hill and as a result Gloranthan publications ended the next year." Since the only previously published material about religion in Glorantha had been the second-edition supplements Cults of Prax and Cults of Terror, this boxed set considerably expanded the number of cults and religions.

In 2018, a new edition was announced.

== Reception ==
In the April 1986 edition of Casus Belli (Issue #32), Jean Demesse pointed out that the lack of religious background in the third edition of Runequest was "an incomprehensible oversight." Demesse believed that this supplement filled that gap, calling it a collection of "superb booklets which tell EVERYTHING you need to know about cult religions." He concluded "In short, for Runequest, you need Gods of Glorantha at all costs."

A review that appeared in the inaugural edition of Adventurer (April 1986) concluded "If you possess a copy of Runequest III then I am sorry to tell you that this is a 'must', especially for those of you wishing to base your game on Glorantha (and let's face, who doesn't?)"

In the March–April 1987 edition of Different Worlds (Issue #45), Steve List noted the introduction of doubt into Runequest religion -- do the gods exist at all? As List summarized it, "Religion has been made subjective." He did think that in trying to cover so much geographical territory, "It falls far short of the detailed treatment lavished on the restricted area that previously published Gloranthan material covered, but opens up vast new areas for gaming." List concluded by giving the supplement an above average rating of 3.5 out of 4 stars, saying, "Those interested in learning about the rest of a fascinating fantasy world will be rewarded."

In the November 1987 edition of Dragon (Issue #127), Ken Rolston was of two minds about Gods of Glorantha. On the one hand, he agreed that "Taken on its own merits, Gods of Glorantha is an excellent product, brilliantly conceived, dramatic and impressive in scope, and presented in an original and effective manner." However, he felt that this product did not stand up well compared to previous out-of-print supplements about Gloranthan cults published by Chaosium. He also had reservations about the need for an encyclopedic treatment of every religion and cult in Glorantha, saying, "Very few GMs need an overview of the religions of the world as much as they need detailed information on the religions in the particular region where their campaign takes place... Gods of Glorantha sacrifices detail and color in cult descriptions for wide coverage of the world's religions. Beginning and intermediate players and GMs need more detail on local religions." Nevertheless, Rolston admitted that "If you're running a Gloranthan campaign, you've gotta have this." However, for those simply looking for ideas for their own non-Gloranthan fantasy campaign, he suggested that while "this offers plenty of sample pantheons, you may prefer something simpler, with a narrower focus and more campaign setting detail."

In the December 1988 issue of The Games Machine (#13), John Wood thought that "The wealth of both spiritual and secular options open up a huge range of possibilities for referees and players." His only criticism was that the booklets seemed "a little dull" when compared with the high quality of the third edition RuneQuest rulebook. But he concluded, "this is a supplement that can't help but fire the imagination of any fantasy role-player, and Gods of Glorantha is a must for any RuneQuest 3 fan."

== See also ==
Other Avalon Hill RuneQuest publications
