= Big Rubble: The Deadly City =

Boxed tabletop role-playing game supplement

Big Rubble
The Deadly City
- Cover art by Brad Foster, 1982.
- Designers: Steve Perrin; Greg Stafford; Oliver Dickinson; Steve Henderson; Mark Lukens; Brian Marick; Gordon Monson; Sandy Petersen; Ken Rolston; Michael Trout; Mark Willner
- Illustrators: Mike Blum; Brad Foster; Charlie Krank
- Publishers: Chaosium; Moon Design Publications
- Publication: 1983 Boxed edition: Chaosium; 1999 "Pavis & Big Rubble": Moon Design Publications; 2019 Classic edition: Chaosium
- Genres: Fantasy
- Systems: RuneQuest
- ISBN: 978-1-56882-519-9

Big Rubble: The Deadly City is a supplement published by Chaosium in 1983 for the fantasy role-playing game RuneQuest.

== Description ==
Big Rubble is a campaign setting within the world of Glorantha that describes the ancient city of Old Pavis, now a vast area of rubble and ruins that surrounds the current small town of Pavis. Rumors speak of treasure and magic that can be found in the ruins.

The boxed set includes a 17" x 22" fold-out map, a 16-page booklet for the players, and a 32-page booklet for the gamemaster. There is also a 92-page book that includes seven adventure scenarios. The first, "Griffin's Gate", introduces the players to the main entrance to the ruins. Each subsequent adventure takes them deeper into the ruins.

== Publication history ==
Chaosium first published the fantasy role-playing game Runequest in 1978, only four years after TSR's Dungeons & Dragons. Many supplements and adventures followed, including Big Rubble, designed by Steve Perrin and Greg Stafford, with adventures by Oliver Dickinson, Steve Henderson, Mark Lukens, Brian Marick, Gordon Monson, Sandy Petersen, Ken Rolston, Michael Trout, and Mark Willner. It was published as a boxed set in 1983, with cover art by Brad Foster, and interior art by Charlie Krank and Mike Blum.

Big Rubble was combined with Pavis: Threshold to Danger and republished in 1999 as a single volume titled Gloranthan Classics Volume I – Pavis & Big Rubble by Moon Design Publications.

The original 1983 edition was republished in 2019 in PDF format as part of Chaosium's "RuneQuest: Classic Edition" Kickstarter.

== Reception ==
In the November 1983 edition of White Dwarf (Issue #47), Oliver Dickinson gave some parts of the supplement an excellent rating of 10 out of 10, especially two of the included scenarios, and rated most of the rest of the contents 8–9, although he thought some of the scenarios were below average, only worth 5–6.

In the February 1984 edition of Dragon, Steve List liked the variety of scenarios, although he found one of them "a little out of place" since it involves travel outside of the area covered by the supplement. List concluded with a strong recommendation, saying, "Big Rubble is one of the best scenario packages I have seen. It is well-produced in a physical sense, and it is well-written and well-planned. As a blend of self-contained scenarios and open-ended setting, it is a valuable addition to the Runequest library.

In Issue 4 of Fantasy Gamer (February–March 1984), Dave Nalle expressed some disappointment, writing, "Big Rubble is a dead city, but does that mean it has to be lifeless? Without some new ideas to hold the player's attention or at least some situational, plot or character innovations, it becomes hard for any but the best GMs to make an adventure exciting no matter how much fascinating background material and information is provided. The same old stuff in a new background isn't really much more than some marginally interesting trivia."

In Issue 25 of Abyss, John Davies called it "an attractively produced package designed for expanding a Gloranthan adventure." Davies found that "A lot of nicely developed background material and information is given for both players and GM ... the information is extensive enough to run an almost infinite series of interactions and encounters." Overall, Davies found the set "well put together, clearly presented and easy to run and understand." However, Davies had a major issue with the actual content, calling it "incredibly boring and unimaginative. It is exactly the same sort of stuff which has been produced to use with Runequest for years, with the same obvious, more or less static or random settings and encounters removed to the background of a ruined city." Davies concluded, "if a world or background is inherently stagnant, as Glorantha seems to be as it develops, it is hard for even the best GMs to make the material anything but a dull and repetitive parade of obscure information and tedious trivia."
