= Pavis: Threshold to Danger =

Tabletop role-playing game supplement

Pavis
Threshold to Danger
- Cover art by Michael Blum and Brad W. Foster.
- Designers: Steve Perrin; Greg Stafford; Oliver Dickinson; Charlie Krank; Sandy Petersen; Ken Rolston; Anders Swenson; Michael Trout; Lynn Willis; M.B. Willner
- Publishers: Chaosium
- Publication: 1983; 43 years ago
- Genres: Fantasy
- Systems: Basic Role-Playing
- ISBN: 978-1-56882-518-2

Pavis: Threshold to Danger is a boxed tabletop role-playing game supplement for RuneQuest, originally published by Chaosium in 1983. This boxed set detailed the fictional city of New Pavis for use in role-playing adventures. It received positive reviews in game periodicals including White Dwarf, Dragon, Different Worlds, and Fantasy Gamer. The set was republished in 1999 by Moon Design Publications in a single volume with Big Rubble: The Deadly City as Gloranthan Classics Volume I – Pavis & Big Rubble. The 1983 edition was republished in 2019 in PDF format as part of Chaosium's RuneQuest: Classic Edition Kickstarter.

== Contents ==
The boxed set contains:

- "What's in the Box", a sheet of paper indexing the contents
- "Common Knowledge", a 40-page stapled booklet with information for the players
  - History and background
  - powerful and notable people
  - cults within the city
  - a license to explore the old ruins, and an explorer's identification document
- "City Guide", a 40-page stapled booklet with information for the gamemaster
  - Geography and details of the surrounding region
  - a description of the city, including its inhabitants, dwellings, religions, food, supplies, taxes, commercial regulations, city gates and bridges
  - Details of the seven districts of the new city
  - 37 typical encounters and random encounter tables
  - politics and tips for political adventures
- "Episodes", a 64-page stapled booklet containing three adventures
  - "Welcome to the City", three short adventures that introduce players to life in the city
  - "Burglary at Raus's House", a short adventure about a chance to burglarize a nobleman's house
  - "The Cradle". When a cradle carrying a giant baby appears on the river, an event that has not happened for over 700 years, the players must choose whether to aid in looting the magical cradle — which will result in the death of the baby — or to defend the cradle against looters.
- two maps
  - 11" x 24" map of the River of Cradles
  - 22" x 34" map of New Pavis

== Publication history ==
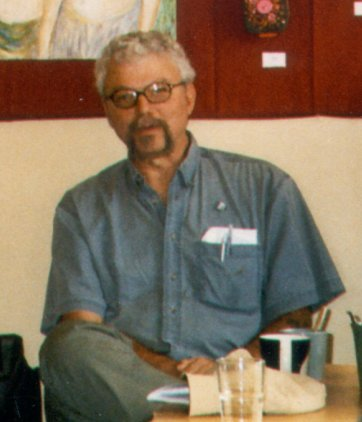
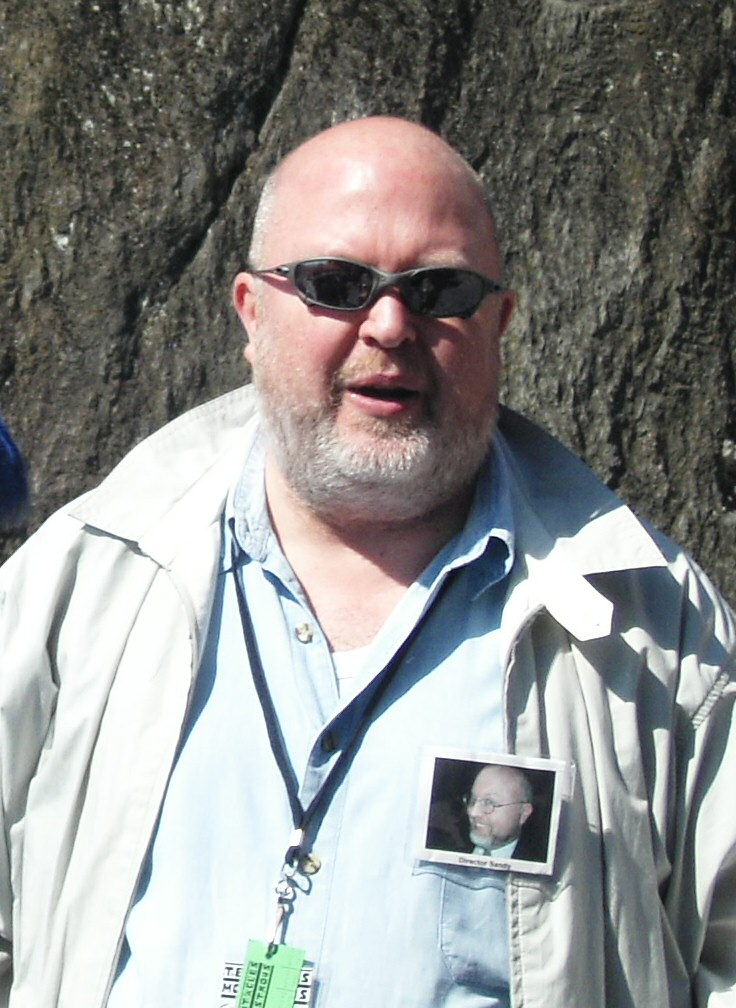
The boxed set's designers included Greg Stafford and Sandy Petersen.

In 1978, Chaosium published the role-playing game RuneQuest, based in Greg Stafford's mythical world of Glorantha. In 1983, Chaosium published Pavis, Threshold to Danger, a boxed set that details the city of New Pavis, which is located in the former suburbs of the ancient ruined city of Pavis.

Pavis, Threshold to Danger was written by Steve Perrin, Greg Stafford, Oliver Dickinson, Charlie Krank, Sandy Petersen, Ken Rolston, Anders Swenson, Michael Trout, Lynn Willis, and M.B. Willner. Artwork was by Michael Blum, Brad W. Foster, and Luise Perenne, cover art by Michael Blum and Brad W. Foster, and cartography by Yurek Chodak, Charlie Krank, and Lynn Willis.

== Reception ==
In the September 1983 edition of White Dwarf (Issue #45), Oliver Dickinson found the materials in the boxed set to be "presented clearly and well," although he noted a few discrepancies. He also pointed out that "The scenario booklet may come as a disappointment to some," since two of the scenarios advertised on the outside of the box were actually held back and published in another supplement, Big Rubble: The Deadly City. However, Dickinson did call the scenarios that were included in this supplement "an excellent introduction to Pavis." In particular, he was impressed by "The Cradle", saying, "It makes a great and touching tale, full of imaginative description, for which Greg Stafford and all his helpers deserve thorough congratulation. I can see no obscurities or problems in it, but a word to the wise GM: keep this for the culmination of your Pavis campaign, for nothing will be the same after it." Dickinson concluded by giving this supplement an excellent rating of 9 out of 10.

In the February 1984 edition of Dragon (Issue #82), Steve List admired the components, saying, "The physical quality of the package is of the high level typical of Chaosium, as is the design." Although there were many writers involved, List though the effort was "well coordinated and integrated." He concluded that this supplement was "a major contribution to the growing body of literature [about Glorantha]. It is well worth obtaining for any lovers of RuneQuest or for Gloranthan scholars."

Erik Gunderson reviewed Pavis for Different Worlds magazine and stated that "In review, Pavis is an excellent value. It is of high physical quality, the writing is excellent, and it is full of information for either an episodic or continuous campaign. Chaosium is once again setting the standards for the industry."

Robert E. James reviewed Pavis: Threshold to Danger for Fantasy Gamer magazine and stated that "Overall, Pavis is worth buying only if you get Big Rubble too, while Big Rubble is incomplete without Pavis. A disappointment, especially when you consider Chaosium's past offerings for RuneQuest — Borderlands, for example."

In the 2014 book Designers & Dragons: The '70s, Shannon Appelcline commented that the RuneQuest world "would remain one of the best-detailed RPG lands for many years. Pavis (1983) and Big Rubble (1983) provided even more detail on a single city and the ruins it was built upon."

== Other recognition ==
A copy of Pavis: Threshold to Danger is held in the collection of the Strong National Museum of Play (object 110.21650).
