= Monster Coliseum =

Fantasy tabletop role-playing game supplement

Arena Combat & Chariot Racing
- Cover illustration by Lisa Free, 1985.
- Designers: Steve Perrin; Dan Nolte; Sandy Petersen
- Publishers: Avalon Hill; Mongoose Publishing
- Publication: 1985 box; 2010 book
- Genres: Fantasy
- Systems: RuneQuest

Monster Coliseum is a tabletop role-playing game supplement for RuneQuest published by Avalon Hill in 1985. Monster Coliseum adapted gladiatorial types and coliseum combat procedures to the RuneQuest rules. Although published by Avalon Hill, the contents are copyrighted by Chaosium, while RuneQuest was a trademark of Avalon Hill. Written by Steve Perrin, Dan Nolte, and Sandy Petersen, with a cover by Lisa Free, and art by Kevin Ramos.

== Publication history ==
The first of Avalon Hill's boxed supplements for their third edition of RuneQuest. An updated version was published in 2010 by Mongoose Publishing for RuneQuest II .

== Contents ==
Derived from Roman examples, Monster Coliseum uses the Colosseum as the model for gladiatorial combat, combat versus various beasts, and chariot races for RuneQuest campaigns. This information is divided into three books:

- 48-page "Coliseum Book"
- 40-page "Monster Book" provides descriptions of various real and fictional beasts
- 16-page book of play aids
- sections of chariot track (using a 5 mm scale)
- a wargaming range stick
- a large map containing a coliseum floorplan (using 15 mm scale)

The 2010 book The 186-page hardcover book was written by Lawrence Whitaker, with artwork by Nick Egberts, Olivier Frot, Danilo Ariel Guida, Kiriko Moth, John Kohlepp, Alejandro Lizaur Gutiérrez, Esther 'Sanz' Muñoz, Pedro Potier, Jean-Michel Ringuet, Sean Thornton, and Robin Wallin. It also contained additional suggestions for integration with the Elric of Melniboné, and Hawkmoon fantasy settings.

- Introduction
- Arena
- Amphitheatres & Coliseums
- Monsters Introduction
- Humans & Humanoids
- Arachnids & Insects
- Dinosaurs & Reptiles
- Creatures of Legend
- Mammals
- The Mean Arena
- Index of Beasts

== Reception ==
Oliver Dickinson reviewed Monster Coliseum for White Dwarf #67, giving it an overall rating of 6 out of 10, and stated that "Unlike a scenario, coliseum combats and chariot races can be staged many times, but despite this, the potential interest of the chariot racing, and the individual features of general use, I cannot see that the high price is fully justified by the contents particularly when so much of the Monsters Book essentially repeats what is already available to GM's."

== Other recognition ==
A copy of Monster Coliseum is held in the collection of the Strong National Museum of Play (object 110.24960).

== See also ==
Other Avalon Hill RuneQuest publications
