= Glorantha: Genertela, Crucible of the Hero Wars =

Fantasy tabletop role-playing game supplement

Glorantha
Genertela, Crucible of the Hero Wars
- Box cover illustration by Steve Purcell.
- Designers: Greg Stafford; Sandy Petersen; William Dunn
- Publishers: Avalon Hill
- Publication: 1988; 38 years ago
- Genres: Fantasy
- Systems: RuneQuest
- ISBN: 9780911605761

Glorantha: Genertela, Crucible of the Hero Wars is a supplement created by Chaosium and published under license by Avalon Hill in 1988 for the fantasy role-playing game RuneQuest.

== Contents ==
Glorantha: Genertela, Crucible of the Hero Wars is a campaign setting that details the continent of Genertela in the fantasy world of Glorantha. The components of the boxed set are:

- 40-page booklet "Glorantha", covers the history of Glorantha,
- 100-page booklet "Genertela", covers the continent of Genertela, broken down into regions, listing inhabitants, culture, form of government, common languages, armies, and religions. It also includes encounter tables for common, uncommon and rare events in each region.
- 36-page "Player's Book", recommends four good starting points and societies for players,
- a large two-color map of the continent.

== Publication history ==
Chaosium first published RuneQuest in 1977. In 1984, seeking a wider distribution and marketing, Chaosium licensed Avalon Hill to create and produce the third edition of RuneQuest. However, Chaosium did not include the setting of Glorantha in the license unless the content was either created or approved by Chaosium staff. As a result, RuneQuest material created by Avalon Hill was usually set in the more generic Fantasy Earth setting.

In keeping with this policy, Glorantha: Genertela, Crucible of the Hero Wars was created in 1988 by Chaosium staff (written by Greg Stafford, Sandy Petersen, and William Dunn, with a cover by Steve Purcell, and illustrations by Kevin Ramos), but was published under license by Avalon Hill as a boxed set.

Shannon Appelcline commented that once Avalon Hill and Chaosium learned that removing Glorantha from RuneQuest was a bad idea, "The Fantasy Earth supplements came to an abrupt halt and Glorantha material started appearing - much of it updating second edition releases, but some of it including totally new material, including the well-received Glorantha (1988) and Elder Secrets (1989)." Appelcline further described this relationship between the two companies: "Though Chaosium initially set new RuneQuest material in "Fantasy Earth," they quickly moved back to Glorantha, publishing classics like Gods of Glorantha (1985), Glorantha (1988), and Elder Secrets of Glorantha (1989). Unfortunately, the relationship between the two companies frayed entirely in 1989. Chaosium ceased working with Avalon Hill and as a result Gloranthan publications ended the next year."

== Reception ==
In the January 1989 edition of Games International (Issue 2), John Scott was pleasantly surprised by the large amount of content in this boxed set, saying, "I didn't expect much from this pack when I opened it, but I am a convert now!" He concluded by giving it a perfect rating of 5 out of 5, commenting, "This is RuneQuest as it was meant to be. Start saving now — you gotta get this pack!"

In the September 1990 edition of Dragon (Issue #161), Jim Bambra admired the sheer amount of content in this boxed set. He called the history book "first class", and noted how major events were often described from several different viewpoints, commenting that "This divergency adds greatly to the mythic content of Glorantha, making it fascinating and very credible." Bambra also complimented the "Genertela" book, saying, "The variety of cultures and societies covered is very impressive, reflecting the years of careful thought and development that as gone into creating Glorantha." However, although Bambra thought this boxed set "is a very impressive product", he felt that "to be used effectively, the Gods of Glorantha supplement is needed; without it, the deities of Glorantha remain little more than a collection of names, but with it Glorantha comes to life." Bambra concluded with a strong recommendation, saying, "Whether you play the RuneQuest game or another system, Glorantha is a world to study and marvel at for its complexity and detail. Players of the RuneQuest game have cause for celebration and more than a little smugness in knowing that the one of the greatest campaign worlds has been designed for them."

== See also ==
Other Avalon Hill RuneQuest publications
