= Vikings (RuneQuest) =

1985 Tabletop role-playing game supplement

Nordic Roleplaying for RuneQuest
- Box cover illustration by Steve Purcell.
- Designers: Greg Stafford; Sandy Petersen
- Publishers: Avalon Hill
- Publication: 1985; 41 years ago
- Genres: Fantasy
- Systems: Basic Role-Playing

Vikings, Nordic Roleplaying for RuneQuest is a boxed tabletop role playing game supplement, written by Greg Stafford and Sandy Petersen, with a cover by Steve Purcell. Published under license by Avalon Hill in 1985 for Chaosium's fantasy role-playing game RuneQuest.

== Contents ==
Vikings provides a campaign setting called "Scania" that uses information from both historical sources and legends of the Viking era. The boxed set contains:

- a 38-page "Players Book"
- a 30-page "Gamemaster Book"
- a 46-page "Scenario Book" containing six linked scenarios
- a 20-page "Viking Digest"
- a 15" x 22" map
- blank character sheets

Information includes daily life in a Viking village, the justice system, character creation, new magic spells, religion, and new monsters.

== Publication history ==
In 1984, Chaosium, the creators of RuneQuest, partnered with Avalon Hill to create a third edition of the role-playing game, hoping to take advantage of the larger company's marketing and publication power. For the most part, Chaosium refused to allow Avalon Hill to produce any material for Runequest's original setting, Glorantha. Instead, Avalon Hill's material was set in a generic feudal setting known as Fantasy Earth. Vikings, the first of the Fantasy Earth supplements, was written by Greg Stafford and Sandy Petersen, with illustrations by Charlie Krank, and cover art by Steve Purcell, and was published by Avalon Hill in 1985.

In the 2014 book Designers & Dragons: The '80s, game historian Shannon Appelcline commented that after Chaosium partnered with Avalon Hill in 1984, "Over the next five years, Chaosium acted as creators of RuneQuest material. Glorantha was largely ignored, other than the singular Gods of Glorantha (1985), but Chaosium did create interesting supplements for the new Fantasy Earth background, including Vikings (1985) and Land of Ninja (1987)."

== Reception ==
Oliver Dickinson reviewed Vikings for White Dwarf #74, giving it an overall rating of 8 out of 10, and stated that "This pack need not interest Viking-lovers only. The society described can provide many analogies for other RQ 'barbarian' societies, the special means for acquiring magic might interest many players, and the scenarios are easily adaptable. Overall, this is a promising start, offering reasonable value for money."

In the May 1992 edition of Dragon (Issue #181), Rick Swan thought that, although Vikings at that time was seven years old, it was "still the one to beat — a thoroughly entertaining treatment of Viking culture, light on the historical clutter that makes so many campaign guides a drag to read." Swan admired both the packaging and the elegant writing. Although he thought the chapter on fantasy and magic was "disappointingly skimpy," he called the new monsters "a treat — an imaginative GM will still find a lot to work with." Swan also thought the campaign book was the high point of the boxed set, calling its contents "intelligent suggestions for staging Viking adventures." He concluded by giving Vikings an above average rating of 4 out of 5, saying, "This offers pure, engaging fun and, despite the rather superficial magic section, is a first-rate fantasy campaign set.

== Other reviews ==
- The V.I.P. of Gaming Magazine #4 (July/Aug. 1986)

== See also ==
Other Avalon Hill RuneQuest publications
