= Trollpak =

Tabletop fantasy role-playing game supplement

Troll Facts, Secrets and Adventures for RuneQuest
- Cover illustration by Lisa A. Free, 1982.
- Designers: Greg Stafford; Sandy Petersen
- Publishers: Chaosium; Avalon Hill; Mongoose Publishing
- Publication: 1982 1st edition; 1988 2nd edition (Avalon Hill); 2007 3rd edition: Trolls - A Guide to the Uz (Mongoose); 2019 Classic edition PDF; 2020 Classic edition POD
- Genres: Fantasy
- Systems: Basic Role-Playing
- ISBN: 978-1-56882-517-5

Trollpak, Troll Facts, Secrets, and Adventures is a boxed fantasy tabletop role-playing supplement, written by Greg Stafford, and Sandy Petersen, with art by Lisa A. Free, and published by Chaosium in 1982. A second edition was published in 1988 by Avalon Hill. Both editions received positive reviews in game periodicals including Different Worlds, Dragon, White Dwarf, The Space Gamer, and Games International.

== Contents ==
Trollpak is a supplement which provides background material for trolls in Glorantha.

The first edition boxed set contained:

- What's In This Box?
- Book 1 Uz - background for troll adventurers.
- Book 2 The Book Of Uz - troll types explained and their religious cults.
- Book 3 Into Uzdom - six scenarios; The Caravans, Skyfall Lake, Grubfarm, Flying Trollkin, The Sazdorf Clan, and Trollball.
- Munchrooms - a troll adventure playable from two separate viewpoints.
- A large map of the troll region of Dagori Inkarth back-printed with a trollball field.
- Player Handouts.

== Publication history ==
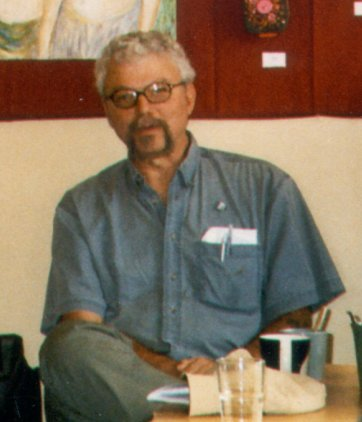
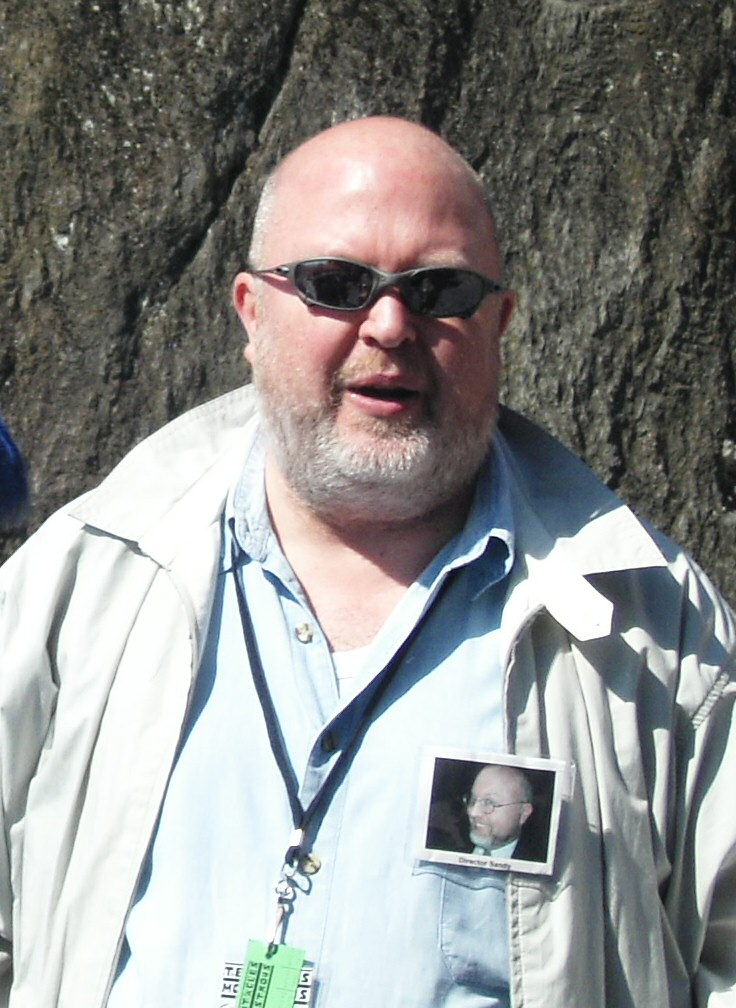
The book was designed by Greg Stafford and Sandy Petersen.

Trollpak was written by Greg Stafford, Sandy Petersen, and Steve Perrin, with art by Lisa Free, and was published by Chaosium in 1982 as boxed set with two 64-page books, a 48-page book, three pamphlets, four pages of player handouts, a large map, and a troll restaurant menu. A second edition was published by The Avalon Hill Game Company in 1989 as a boxed set containing a 56-page book, a 48-page book, a 36-page book, six troll character record sheets, a map, a contents sheet, a cardstock troll restaurant menu, and a large color map.

Originally published in 1982, a second edition was published in 1988, designed and produced by Chaosium, published by Avalon Hill. Updated for their third edition of the RuneQuest rules, it featured new box cover art by Steve Purcell. The troll religious cults were published as separate boxed set as Troll Gods, and book 3, Into Uzdom was published separately as Into the Troll Realms. The remaining books were updated and revised, with new material added. Written it was republished in 2019 in PDF format as part of Chaosium's RuneQuest: Classic Edition Kickstarter.

== Reception ==
In the September 1982 edition of Different Worlds (Issue #24), Ken Rolston praised this product, commenting that it "establishes with its release the model for a detailed treatment of a nonhuman race for fantasy role-playing. Not only is it well organized for use and designed to be adaptable to various gaming styles, but it is readable and full of humor and drama." He concluded with a strong recommendation, saying, " For RuneQuest gamers, this package is a must; for gamers using other systems, this package should be read just to show what can be done to make the traditional orcish tackling dummy into a magnificent creation, worthy of our understanding and respect, and because of our respect, all the more worthy an opponent or friend."

In Issue 21 of Abyss, Jon Schuller called this "one of very few truly background-oriented role-playing aids on the market and is quite an impressive work. Of all the excellent Runequest supplements and aids, this is easily the most interesting."

Rolston gave a similarly positive review in the November 1982 edition of Dragon (Issue #67), saying "Simply said, Trollpak is awfully good. The perspective is imaginative, the style entertaining and readable, and the materials intelligently designed and replete with dramatic and challenging adventures. For RuneQuest gamers, it is required equipment; for gamers using other systems, it is a model for detailed development of a non-human race — stimulating and amusing."

Tim Moyse reviewed Trollpak for White Dwarf #36, giving it an overall rating of 9 out of 10, and stated that "The first two books easily justify buying Trollpak on their own. The addition of the scenario book makes it an invaluable addition to the addition to the campaign. Many details are easily adapted to non-Gloranthan campaigns, resulting in an excellent product."

Dave Nalle reviewed Trollpak in The Space Gamer No. 62. Nalle commented that "Trollpak is a fascinating product, in spite of its flaws. It is a must-buy for RQ players who use Glorantha. Beyond that, it is an impressive work of detail and comprehensive design which I hope will serve as a model for future game-aid designers. While its value to non-RQers is hard to define, it is well worth looking at, and could lead to the birth of new ideas and adaptations for any game."

In the August 1989 edition of Games International (Issue 8), Philip A. Murphy reviewed the 1989 reprint, and noted that it was much shorter than the original edition, having had four scenarios, the rules for TrollBall, description of six troll gods and the Sazdorf Clan removed. He questioned who would buy this, since veteran RuneQuest players would have already played all of the material in this book when it originally appeared. However, Murphy did urge any RuneQuest player who did not own a copy of the original TrollPak to "go out and buy this TrollPak now! Boy, are you in for a treat!" He concluded by giving this an above-average rating of 4 out of 5, saying, "The contents are fascinatingly informative, endlessly useful and will add an inestimable amount of 'colour' to your campaign."

In the December 1990 edition of Dragon (Issue 164), Jim Bambra reviewed the 1989 reprint and commented, "Even though reduced in size, it remains one of the best treatments of a nonhuman face available." He concluded with a strong recommendation, saying, "Trollpak is an excellent example of how to breathe life and creativity into nonhuman races, and I recommend to anyone interested in seeing its superb presentation. Trolls in the RuneQuest game may be monsters, but they are well characterized and believably motivated."

== See also ==
Other Avalon Hill RuneQuest publications
