= Elder Secrets of Glorantha =

Tabletop fantasy role-playing game supplement

Mysteries of the Elder Races Revealed
- Cover by Nick Smith
- Designers: Greg Stafford; Sandy Petersen
- Publishers: Avalon Hill
- Publication: 1989; 37 years ago
- Genres: Fantasy
- Systems: Basic Role-Playing
- ISBN: 1560380063

Elder Secrets of Glorantha is a 1989 role-playing game supplement for RuneQuest published by Avalon Hill.

== Contents ==
Elder Secrets of Glorantha is a supplement which details the lore of Glorantha regarding topics such as the City of Wonders and the Plateau of statues, and information on Dragonkind and more.

== Publication history ==
Elder Secrets of Glorantha was written by Greg Stafford and Sandy Petersen, with a cover by Nick Smith and illustrations by Dave Dobyski, and was published by The Avalon Hill Game Co. in 1990 as a boxed set containing a 124-page book, a 52-page book, and a large color map.

Shannon Appelcline commented that once Avalon Hill and Chaosium learned that removing Glorantha from RuneQuest was a bad idea, "The Fantasy Earth supplements came to an abrupt halt and Glorantha material started appearing - much of it updating second edition releases, but some of it including totally new material, including the well-received Glorantha (1988) and Elder Secrets (1989)." Appelcline further described this relationship between the two companies: "Though Chaosium initially set new RuneQuest material in "Fantasy Earth," they quickly moved back to Glorantha, publishing classics like Gods of Glorantha (1985), Glorantha (1988), and Elder Secrets of Glorantha (1989). Unfortunately, the relationship between the two companies frayed entirely in 1989. Chaosium ceased working with Avalon Hill and as a result Gloranthan publications ended the next year."

== Reception ==
Games International magazine reviewed Elder Secrets of Glorantha and stated that "All in all, de rigeur [sic] for the Glorantha junkie, but only of slight inspirational use to anyone else."

== See also ==
Other Avalon Hill RuneQuest publications
