= Land of Ninja =

Fantasy tabletop role-playing game supplement

Samurai Roleplaying in Feudal Japan
- Avalon Hill edition, cover by Steve Purcell
- Designers: Bob Charrette; Sandy Petersen
- Publishers: Avalon Hill; Games Workshop
- Publication: 1987; 39 years ago
- Genres: Fantasy
- Systems: Basic Role-Playing

Land of Ninja is a supplement published under license by Avalon Hill in 1987 for Chaosium's fantasy role-playing game RuneQuest.

== Description ==
Land of Ninja provides a medieval Japanese setting for RuneQuest called "Nihon". The 1987 Avalon Hill edition was published as a boxed set that contained

- a 72-page book for players titled "Book of the Samurai": Nihon character creation, occupations, skills, religion, magic, travel, samurai, and ninja
- a 32-page book for the gamemaster titled "Book of the World": Nihon civilization, history, and creatures
- a 24-page book of scenarios title "Scenario Book": planning a campaign, two short introductory scenarios, one full-length scenario ("The Hatamoto's Illness)
- a 16-page book titled "Nihon Digest" that contains pre-generated characters for use in the included scenarios.

== Publication history ==
Chaosium originally published Runequest in 1978, and quickly followed this with a second edition the following year. Then in an attempt to increase distribution and marketing of Runequest, Chaosium made a deal with Avalon Hill in 1984 to publish the third edition of RuneQuest. Under the agreement, Avalon Hill took ownership of the trademark for RuneQuest, but Chaosium did not include the setting of Glorantha in the license unless the content was either created or approved by Chaosium staff. If Chaosium did not supply Glorantha material, Avalon Hill used either a generic setting called "Fantasy Earth" or and alternative fantasy setting called Gateway.

Land of Ninja, a non-Glorantha product set in Avalon Hill's generic "Fantasy Earth", was written by Bob Charrette and Sandy Petersen, with interior art by Kevin Ramos and Katushika Hokusai, and cover art Steve Purcell. It was published in North America by Avalon Hill in 1987. It was also published the same year under license in the U.K. by Games Workshop as a single 144-page hardcover book with the same content and interior art as Avalon Hill's edition, but with cover art by Angus Fieldhouse.

Shannon Appelcline commented that after the third edition of RuneQuest was released in 1984, "Over the next five years, Chaosium acted as creators of RuneQuest material. Glorantha was largely ignored, other than the singular Gods of Glorantha (1985), but Chaosium did create interesting supplements for the new Fantasy Earth background, including Vikings (1985) and Land of Ninja (1987)."

Games Workshop edition, cover by Angus Fieldhouse

== Reception ==
In the June 1988 edition of Dragon (#134), Jim Bambra reviewed the Games Workshop hardcover edition published in the U.K., and although he thought the game rules "smoothly transfer the RuneQuest game to Nihon", he did warn that this supplement assumed players already had a good working knowledge of RuneQuest rules. Bambra also pointed out that scenario maps had not been printed in the U.K. edition, which "makes running these adventures difficult, to say the least." He concluded by recommending it to current RuneQuest players, but for those who were new to RuneQuest, he recommended that they start with RuneQuest first and work their way up to Land of Ninja.

In Issue 8 of The Games Machine, John Woods reviewed the Games Workshop hardcover edition published in the U.K., and liked the high production values. He also liked some of the new rules specific to Nihon such as Honor, and Ki used in skills and magic. Woods concluded with a strong recommendation, saying, "A very worthy and honorable addition to any RuneQuest player’s collection."

== Reviews ==
- Casus Belli #43 (Feb 1988)

== See also ==
Other Avalon Hill RuneQuest publications
