= Creatures of Chaos 1: Scorpion Men and Broos =

Creatures of Chaos 1: Scorpion Men and Broos is a 1978 role-playing game supplement published by Chaosium for RuneQuest.

== Contents ==
Creatures of Chaos 1: Scorpion Men and Broos is a supplement in which computer‑generated stat blocks are provided for nearly a hundred scorpion men and broos, along with guidance for gamemasters on how to incorporate these creatures effectively in play.

== Publication history ==
Creatures of Chaos I: Scorpion Men and Broos was written by Ray Turney with Greg Stafford and published by Chaosium in 1978 as a 16-page book.
