= Troll Gods =

Tabletop fantasy role-playing game supplement

The Deities of Darkness
- Cover by Tom Sullivan
- Designers: Greg Stafford; Sandy Petersen
- Publishers: The Avalon Hill Game Co.
- Publication: 1989; 37 years ago
- Genres: Fantasy
- Systems: Basic Role-Playing

Troll Gods is a 1989 role-playing game supplement for RuneQuest published by Avalon Hill.

== Contents ==
Troll Gods is a supplement in which the trolls of Glorantha and their cults are detailed.

== Publication history ==
Troll Gods was written by Greg Stafford and Sandy Petersen with William Dunn, with a cover by Tom Sullivan, and illustrations by Dave Dobyski, and was published by The Avalon Hill Game Co. in 1990 as a boxed set with an 88-page book, a 28-page book, and a large two-color map.

Shannon Appelcline explained that by 1987, RuneQuest was the only role-playing game still being published by Avalon Hill, which wanted to cut production costs on the game, so that "in-house cartographer Dave Dobyski was given all artwork assignments for RuneQuest. Though his maps were top rate, he wasn't an illustrator, and it showed in the amateurish drawings that appeared starting in Troll Gods (1989)."

== Reception ==
Philip A Murphy reviewed Troll Gods for Games International magazine, and gave it 4 stars out of 5, and stated that "If your RuneQuest campaign takes place in Glorantha, this is another coup for Chaosium – I'm afraid you just can't live without this one!."

== Reviews ==
- Dragon #164 (Dec. 1990)

== See also ==
Other Avalon Hill RuneQuest publications
