= Balastor's Barracks =

Fantasy tabletop role-playing game supplement

- Balastor's Barracks; published by Chaosium in 1978.; Cover by Guy Conrad 1978.
- Designers: Steve Henderson; Warren James; Steve Perrin
- Publishers: Chaosium
- Publication: 1978 softback; 1983 in Big Rubble; 1999 in Pavis & Big Rubble; 2016 Classic Edition softback & PDF; 2019 in Classic Edition Big Rubble PDF; 2020 Classic edition POD; 2020 in Classic Edition Big Rubble POD
- Genres: Fantasy
- Systems: RuneQuest

Balastor's Barracks is a tabletop role-playing game adventure for RuneQuest, originally published by Chaosium in 1978. Set in Greg Stafford's world of Glorantha, against the backdrop of an ancient ruined city, the adventurers search for a lost artifact.

== Publication history ==
As RuneQuest Scenario Pack 1, it was the first published adventure for RuneQuest in 1978. In 1983, a revised version appeared in the Big Rubble: The Deadly City boxed set, which set the adventure in the Griffin Gate area of the Big Rubble, along with other related scenarios. It was republished in 1999 by Moon Design Publications in Gloranthan Classics Volume I – Pavis & Big Rubble . The original edition was republished in 2016 in softcover and PDF format and included in the RuneQuest Old School Resource Pack as part of Chaosium's RuneQuest: Classic Edition Kickstarter. with a POD edition in 2020. Likewise, a Classic Edition of Big Rubble including Balastor's Barracks was republished in 2019, with a POD edition in 2020.

== Contents ==
Originally published as a 24-page booklet with a cardstock cover. The booklet is divided into an introductory section, two maps, and a description of 35 rooms containing over 60 monsters who seem to have no relationship with each other or the environment. The revised version in Big Rubble shrank it to 14 pages, mainly cleaning up the layout, and reducing the number of monsters to around 45.

== Reception ==
In the August–September 1979 edition of White Dwarf (Issue #14), Jim Donohoe thought the adventure was "too much of a killer dungeon to be satisfactory as a campaign." However, he believed Balastor's Barracks might be usable as a single introductory adventure, since "If used as a solitaire dungeon, Balastor's Barracks will give a feel as to what a party of Runequest characters can handle. The layout of the Barracks — three tough complexes and a few odd rooms —— means that only a party of very tough characters can expect to survive." Given its lack of general usability, he gave the adventure a poor rating of only 5 out of 10.

Writing a retrospective review for Guide de Rôliste Galactique in 2009, Jérôme Bianquis thought that even though this was a very early publication by Chaosium, it was a poor effort that did not fulfill the potential of RuneQuest. Bianquis especially noted the numerous monsters shoehorned into a succession of rooms that "have no particular reason to be there, and one wonders how they manage to live together, and to feed themselves." He concluded that it was an adventure "without imagination, and without any interest."
