= The Haunted Ruins =

Role-playing game supplement

The Haunted Ruins is a 1989 role-playing game supplement published by Avalon Hill for RuneQuest.

== Contents ==
The Haunted Ruins is a supplement in which a dwarven stronghold near Dragon Pass has been seized by the Sazdorf troll clan, and detailed information is offered on the clan's leaders and culture along with a mapped overview of Battle Valley.

== Publication history ==
The Haunted Ruins, A Complete Troll Tribe for RuneQuest was written by Greg Stafford and Sandy Petersen, with John B. Monroe, Frédéric Blayo, and Lynn Willis, with a cover by Tom Sullivan, and illustrations by Daniel Brererton and published by The Avalon Hill Game Co. in 1990 as 64-page book with a cardstock map.
