= Splatbook =

TTRPG supplement for players

A splatbook or sourcebook is a supplement for a particular role-playing game (RPG) that is not needed for basic play, but is devoted to a particular facet, such as a character class or fictional faction, providing additional background details, scenarios, rules options, or other materials that players can use to extend or enhance the central game. For example, a "swords and sorcery" fantasy game might offer splatbooks for each of the races in the setting: humans, dwarves, elves, and others. A splatbook supplements the core materials of a game, which are typically given in a basic publication known as the core rulebook or by other names — these core books might also be referred to as sourcebooks, occasionally. Splatbooks may also be offered for other types of games, such as wargames or other tabletop games.

== History ==
=== Origins ===
The term "splatbook" arose in the 1990s. It originally described the sourcebooks published in the early 1990s by White Wolf Game Studio for its World of Darkness games. Many of these books were titled using similar patterns: clanbooks in Vampire: The Masquerade, tribebooks for Werewolf: The Apocalypse, traditionbooks for Mage: The Ascension, and so forth. In newsgroups, these were called *books (the asterisk on a computer keyboard being used as a wildcard character). Since the asterisk is also known as a "splat", this gave rise to the term "splatbook".

=== Modern usage ===
The term "splatbook" is now used to describe a range of sourcebooks, including those which predated the term. Shannon Appelcline and Stu Horvath have cited the 1978 book Mercenary, created for the science fiction RPG Traveller, and the 1979 sourcebook Cults of Prax, created for the fantasy RPG RuneQuest, as examples of the splatbook format which preceded its definition. Other examples include Advanced Dungeons & Dragons books such as the "Complete" series (The Complete Book of Dwarves, Complete Arcane, etc.), or the numerous codices for Warhammer Fantasy Battle and Warhammer 40,000. By extension, the term "splat" is used for the character class described in a splatbook.

== Examples ==
Popular gaming series with many sourcebooks include:

- GURPS
- BattleTech
- Dungeons & Dragons
- Shadowrun
