= Apple Lane =

Fantasy role-playing game setting

- 1978 cover art by William Church
- Designers: Greg Stafford
- Publishers: 1978 Chaosium; 1984 Avalon Hill; 2009 Moon Design Publications; 2010 Moon Design Publications; 2016 Chaosium; 2018 Chaosium
- Genres: Fantasy
- Systems: Basic Role-Playing; HeroQuest
- ISBN: 9781568825106

Apple Lane is a collection of adventures published by Chaosium in 1978 for the fantasy role-playing game Runequest. It was the second set of adventures published for the Glorantha campaign setting.

== Description ==
Apple Lane is an introductory scenario book featuring three short adventure scenarios for beginner gamemasters (GMs) and players. The first and second editions of the book were designed for RuneQuest 2 (RQ2), while the third edition was revised for RuneQuest 3 (RQ3).

Apple Lane is a collection of adventures for the Runequest system that are set in the small village of Apple Lane, in the world of Glorantha set in the Gloranthan year of 1613.

As British critic Charles Vasey noted, this is not the quintessential British medieval village of "houses, three fields, a manor house or castle and common land ... This is a Californian [idea of a] village: a group of craftsmen and service installations at a road junction." The village includes a brothel, a guild hall, a smithy, an inn, a temple, a pawnshop, and a jail. Notable personalities such as the sheriff are detailed as well.

== Scenarios ==
Three scenarios are included:

- "Tribal Initiation": A mini-scenario in which inexperienced tribal youth fight, designed to teach players the rules for combat.
- "Apple Lane": Gringle the pawnbroker hires the adventurers to protect his shop from a band of marauders.
- "Rainbow Mounds": The sheriff deputizes the adventurers to flush out the 'Troll in the Wall Gang' from a tunnel complex.

== Publication history ==
Apple Lane was written by Greg Stafford and was published by Chaosium in 1978 as a 48-page book with a yellow cover. The second edition was published in 1980 as a 32-page typeset book, and was only included in the boxed second edition Runequest and never sold separately. The third edition was published by The Avalon Hill Game Company in 1988 as a 40-page book with a cover by Steve Purcell and illustrations by Ron Leming.

Apple Lane was first published in 1978 as Scenario Pack 2, the second published adventure for RuneQuest. It was immediately re-released as Apple Lane.

In 1987, Apple Lane was updated to Avalon Hill's third edition of RuneQuest, featuring a colour cover, redrawn maps, new art, and pullout reference section.

In 2009, it was updated for the second edition of HeroQuest by Moon Design Publications. This edition advanced the timeline by three years to 1619.

Return to Apple Lane published by Moon Design Publications in 2009 advanced the timeline by three years to 1616. Although it contained new character art, the maps were from the first edition, and it did not contain three scenarios.

In 2016, the original edition was republished by Chaosium as a softcover book and a PDF as part of RuneQuest: Classic Edition Kickstarter.

In 2019, Apple Lane was republished in RuneQuest - Gamemaster Screen Pack Adventure. In the book's first adventure, Defending Apple Lane, the setting is updated to the year 1625 and the hamlet becomes a starting base for new adventurers. This edition also did not contain the original scenarios.

In 2020, Chaosium released a POD version of the Classic edition.

== Reception ==
In Issue 38 of the British game magazine Perfidious Albion, Charles Vasey called this "a definite improvement over Balastor's Barracks, it could be a real community and you will find it easy to key other adventures into the rich detail of life in Apple Lane."

In Issue 35 of The Space Gamer, Forrest Johnson commented "This is a good supplement for novice RuneQuest referees. Things are spelled out in sufficient detail for most purposes; not much improvisation is required. The two scenarios given show a lot of imagination, and are suitable for beginning characters. [...] On the negative side, experienced characters may find Apple Lane a wee bit tame."
