= Trolls and Trollkin =

Trolls and Trollkin is a 1978 role-playing game supplement published by Chaosium for RuneQuest.

== Contents ==
Trolls and Trollkin is a supplement in which computer‑generated stat blocks are provided for forty‑two dark trolls and more than a hundred trollkin.

== Publication history ==
Trolls & Trollkin was written by Ray Turney and published by Chaosium Inc in 1978 as a 16-page book.

== Reviews ==
- Craft, Model, and Hobby Industry Magazine
