= Militia & Mercenaries =

Militia & Mercenaries is a 1979 role-playing game supplement published by Chaosium for RuneQuest.

== Contents ==
Militia & Mercenaries is a supplement in which computer‑generated stat blocks are offered for nearly a hundred non-player character soldiers.

== Publication history ==
Militia & Mercenaries was written by Ray Turney and published by Chaosium Inc in 1979 as a 16-page book.

== Reviews ==
- Different Worlds (Issue 3 - Jun 1979)
