= Runemasters (RuneQuest) =

Role-playing game supplement

- Cover by Luise Perenne
- Designers: William R. Keyes
- Publishers: Chaosium
- Publication: 1980; 46 years ago
- Genres: Fantasy
- Systems: Basic Role-Playing
- ISBN: 978-1568821979

Runemasters is a tabletop role-playing game supplement for RuneQuest. Originally published by Chaosium in 1980, it was republished in 2017 in PDF format as part of Chaosium's RuneQuest: Classic Edition Kickstarter.

== Contents ==
Runemasters is a supplement which presents character creation rules for rune masters. RuneMasters details 45 powerful non-player characters representing the cults introduced in Cults of Prax, provides advice on creating and using high-level characters.

== Publication history ==
RuneMasters was written by William R. Keyes, with art by Luise Perenne, and was published by Chaosium in 1980 as a 48-page book.

== Reception ==
Forrest Johnson reviewed Runemasters in The Space Gamer No. 33. Johnson commented that "Many GMs prefer to create their own NPCs, but this is a time saver."

Oliver Macdonald reviewed Runemasters for White Dwarf #25, giving it an overall rating of 9 out of 10, and stated that "In all RuneMasters contains a lot of useful material and would be well worth the cost to any GM as long as they use the Cults of Prax. Obviously drawing, as it does, such a lot of material from this book its usefulness is greatly reduced otherwise."

John T. Sapienza, Jr. reviewed Rune Masters for Different Worlds magazine and stated that "The value of this volume is in its advice on how to play RQ with tactical skill taught by a master. This is delightful book - highly recommended."
