= RuneQuest Judges Shield =

RuneQuest Judges Shield is a 1980 role-playing game supplement published by Judges Guild for RuneQuest.

== Contents ==
RuneQuest Judges Shield is a supplement in which a gamemaster's screen is presented for the 2nd edition of RuneQuest.

== Publication history ==
RuneQuest Judges Shield was published by Judges Guild in 1980 as two cardstock sheets.

== Reception ==
Lawrence Schick noted that this screen was "rendered pretty useless by significant errors in its tables".

== Reviews ==
- Different Worlds (Issue 8 - Jun 1980)
