= Questworld (RuneQuest) =

Tabletop role-playing game supplement

- Cover art by Mark Roland
- Designers: John E. Boyle; Mark Florio; Rick Goldberg; Mark Harmon; Janet Kirby; Alan LaVergne; Greg Stafford; Michael Trout
- Publishers: Chaosium
- Publication: 1982; 44 years ago
- Genres: Fantasy
- Systems: RuneQuest

Questworld is a boxed supplement published by Chaosium in 1982 for the fantasy tabletop role-playing game RuneQuest.

== Description ==
In 1978, Chaosium created the fantasy role-playing game RuneQuest, and used Greg Stafford's mythical world of Glorantha as the official setting. Stafford tightly controlled material proposed for Glorantha, editing or vetoing material that did not match "the complex Gloranthan cosmology, theology, biology, sociology, and politics." In an article in Different Worlds in 1981, Stafford and co-author Lynn Abbey wrote, "Glorantha is a closed world, and is intended to stay that way." Chaosium recognized the need for a more "open" world if RuneQuest was to expand its market share, and the result was a product called Questworld, where writers would be free to create RuneQuest material without Stafford's oversight. As Stafford wrote, "QuestWorld is intended to be an open campaign world for RuneQuest and its variants... Chaosium will minimally direct the development of this planet, intending it to serve as an example of an open world in the same way that Glorantha has been our example of a closed world."

== Publication history ==
Questworld was written by John E. Boyle, Mark Florio, Rick Goldberg, Mark Harmon, Janet Kirby, Alan LaVergne, Greg Stafford, and Michael Trout, with art by Luise Perenne. It contains

- an 8-page introductory booklet
- three booklets, each containing three linked adventures:
  - Candlefire
  - Greenwald Tales
  - Lord Skyppen's Mansion
- two maps
- a reference sheet.

== Reception ==
In the April 1983 edition of Dragon (Issue #72), Ken Rolston noted that although the materials were professionally produced, the writing "is a little more uneven than in several of the company’s other recent publications." He found the included scenarios to be "well written, carefully introduced, and coherently organized," although he found some of the adventures to be less compelling than others. He concluded "On balance, Questworld is a worthwhile purchase."

In the July 1983 edition of White Dwarf (Issue #43), Oliver Dickinson had a lot of issues with the supplement. He criticized the lack of background detail, saying "Scarcely any detail of the history, population, etc., of Greenwald is provided, and the map shows a few major geographical features and a scattering of places, many not referred to anywhere in the text." He also noted the many errors, commenting, "The pack shows many signs of having been compiled in haste, without adequate editorial supervision." Finally Dickinson was not impressed with the quality of the nine adventures, saying, "All this might not matter so much if the actual adventures were really novel and interesting, but they are mostly conventional." He concluded by giving the supplement a below average rating of 6 out of 10, stating, "Any hope that Chaosium's first publication on its own continent, Kanos, would give a lead in exploiting the new freedom will (it pains me to write it) be disappointed."

Steve List reviewed Questworld for Fantasy Gamer magazine and stated that "Since Questworld is open to all GMs to make what they will of it, other material (such as Thieves' World) can be incorporated as well. The small number of production errors encountered is trivial in comparison to what can be found in products from other publishers. The physical quality of the books and maps is, as usual from Chaosium, excellent. This is a worthwhile addition to the body of RQ material; although it is of little use to those who wish to stick with a Gloranthan setting, it is well worth the money to less traditional GMs and players."
