= Shadows on the Borderland =

Role-playing game adventure

Shadows on the Borderland is a 1993 role-playing adventure for RuneQuest published by Avalon Hill.

== Plot summary ==
Shadows on the Borderland is an adventure in which the Chaos cults menace the player characters in three adventure scenarios.

== Reception ==
Phillip Hessel reviewed Shadows on the Borderland in White Wolf #40 (1994), rating it a 3.5 out of 5 and stated that "Shadows should provide several evenings of excitement, and some material can be re-used."

== Reviews ==
- Tales of the Reaching Moon #10 (Summer, 1993)
- Dragon #200 (Dec., 1993)
- The Last Province (Issue 4 - June / July 1993)
