= RuneSlayers =

Role-playing game

RuneSlayers is a free role-playing game first published in 1998 by its authors, J.C. Connors and Christopher Lawrence. The game was originally developed as RuneQuest: Slayers, a follow-up to the third edition of RuneQuest by the publisher Avalon Hill, which owned the RuneQuest trademark at the time. In 1998 Avalon Hill was acquired by Hasbro and the project was canceled. The authors then published the game on the internet as a free PDF file, under the title RuneSlayers.

== History ==
The first two editions of RuneQuest were published in 1978 and 1980, respectively, by Chaosium. They were firmly set in Chaosium founder Greg Stafford's fictional world of Glorantha. The third edition was published in 1984 by Avalon Hill as part of a deal where Avalon Hill took ownership of the RuneQuest trademark while Chaosium retained copyright to the rules text and full ownership of the Glorantha setting, which Avalon Hill used under license. In the mid 1990s, Avalon Hill began work on a fourth edition of RuneQuest subtitled Adventures in Gorantha, however Stafford did not approve of the project and it was canceled. Avalon Hill, to assert their trademark to the RuneQuest name, instead hired new designers on the project to start over with a fresh approach. Slated for a 1998 release, RuneQuest: Slayers, did not resemble previous editions in regards to rules and focused on a low-magic setting inspired by pulp sword and sorcery fiction.

RuneQuest: Slayers was already at the printers when Hasbro purchased Avalon Hill and canceled the project. RuneQuest: Slayers was never formally released.

The rights to RuneQuest: Slayers then reverted to the authors, and they released the retitled game as RuneSlayers as a free PDF on the Internet.
