= Eldarad: The Lost City =

Fantasy tabletop role-playing game supplement

- Cover art by Jim Holloway.
- Designers: Chris Watson
- Publishers: Avalon Hill
- Publication: 1990
- Genres: Fantasy
- Systems: Basic Role-Playing

Eldarad: The Lost City is a campaign setting published under license by Avalon Hill in 1990 for Chaosium's fantasy role-playing game RuneQuest.

== Description ==
The vast ancient city of Eldarad, falling into ruins, is designed as the setting for a longterm role-playing Runequest campaign. The city is not set within a specific country or region, allowing the gamemaster to place it within any campaign setting. There is no central authority in the city, only petty warlords who have carved out neighbourhoods that they control.

The package comes with:

- a 54-page "City Book": The city and its inhabitants
- a 56-page "Adventure Book": The region surrounding the city, and two full scenarios set in the city
- a 32-page "Map Book": Maps of specific locations in the scenarios
- two small A4 color maps
- two large color maps of the city

== Publication history ==
Chaosium originally published Runequest in 1978, and quickly followed this with a second edition the following year. In an attempt to increase distribution and marketing of Runequest, Chaosium made a deal with game giant Avalon Hill in 1984 to publish the third edition of RuneQuest. Under the agreement, Avalon Hill took ownership of the trademark for RuneQuest, but Chaosium did not include the setting of Glorantha in the license unless the content was either created or approved by Chaosium staff. If Chaosium did not supply Glorantha material, Avalon Hill used a generic setting called "Fantasy Earth".

In the 2014 book Designers & Dragons: The '80s, game historian Shannon Appelcline noted that after six years "Avalon Hill decided to continue RuneQuest by publishing non-Gloranthan material. However, rather than returning to their colorful Fantasy Earth, they instead published two books set in completely different fantasy milieus, Daughters of Darkness (1990) and Eldarad (1990). These books were widely derided by RuneQuest fans, in large part due to their lack of applicability to any RuneQuest game (except those of the authors)."

Eldarad, published by Avalon Hill in 1990, was written by Chris Watson, with interior art by JE Randall and Terry Thompson, and cover art by Jim Holloway.

== Reception ==
Phil Hessel gave the product a mixed review in the February–March 1991 issue of White Wolf. He compared it to Chaosium's Thieves' World. He rated it overall at 3 out of a possible 5 points.
