= Plunder (RuneQuest) =

Tabletop role-playing game supplement

RuneQuest Book of Treasure
- Designers: Rudy Kraft
- Publishers: Chaosium
- Publication: 1980; 46 years ago
- Genres: Fantasy
- Systems: Basic Role-Playing

Plunder is a tabletop role-playing game supplement for RuneQuest. Originally published by Chaosium in 1980, it was republished in 2016 in PDF format as part of Chaosium's RuneQuest: Classic Edition Kickstarter.

== Contents ==
Plunder is a supplement which includes a method for generating treasure, as well as statistics for 43 magic items by Rudy Kraft.

== Reception ==
Forrest Johnson reviewed Plunder in The Space Gamer No. 33. Johnson commented that "the lack of exotic magic items has heretofore been a weak point in RuneQuest. The items have authentic Gloranthan flavor, complete with history and cult affinities. The discreet use of these items will add spice to a campaign without reducing it to Monty Haul."

Oliver Macdonald reviewed Plunder for White Dwarf #25, giving it an overall rating of 5 out of 10, and stated that "All points considered Plunder is an interesting but by no means essential RuneQuest play aid, certainly not worth buying if you have a limited budget."

John T. Sapienza, Jr. reviewed Plunder for Different Worlds magazine and stated that "Plunder is a useful idea, and well done. I recommend it to all RQ GMs."

== Reviews ==
- The Dungeoneers Journal (Issue 25 - Feb/Mar 1981)
