= Cults of Prax =

Tabletop fantasy role-playing game supplement

15 Religions for RuneQuest
- Original edition, cover art by Steve Swentson, 1979.
- Designers: Steve Perrin; Greg Stafford
- Publishers: Chaosium
- Publication: 1979; 47 years ago
- Genres: Fantasy
- Systems: Basic Role-Playing
- ISBN: 978-1-56882-194-8

Cults of Prax is a supplement published by Chaosium in 1979 for the fantasy role-playing game RuneQuest that describes the various religions that are central to the game. It was republished in 2016 in PDF format as part of Chaosium's RuneQuest: Classic Edition Kickstarter.

== Contents ==
Cults of Prax is a supplement which provides descriptions of 15 cults as well as the gods they worship. Since membership and an increasing involvement in the cult is necessary to gain magic and other abilities, religion and worship become central to the game for all characters.

== Publication history ==
Chaosium first published the fantasy role-playing game RuneQuest in 1978. The following year, Steve Perrin and Greg Stafford created Cults of Prax, a 112-page softcover book with cover art by Steve Swentson and interior art by William Church, Guy Conrad, Gene Day, and Luise Perenne.

In his 2014 book Designers & Dragons, Shannon Appelcline noted that "Though some of RuneQuest's first supplements were simple dungeon crawls and stat books, many others were groundbreaking. Cults of Prax (1979) and Cults of Terror (1981) gave precise details on the worship of a few dozen gods within the world of Glorantha, further delving into the depths of RuneQuest's sophisticated religions."

== Reception ==
In Issue 46 of the British wargaming magazine Perfidious Albion, Charles Vasey commented "As ever with Stafford-Perrin productions the excellence of Greg's imaginative mythos is matched by Perrin's FRP knowledge. The result makes poor old bumbling TSR look rather like magicians in the presence of Gandalf. With a simpler combat system there would be no stopping Runequest."

In Issue 27 of The Space Gamer, American game designer Steve Jackson commented that "Gods don't have to be effective to be important. Belief is the thing, and the interactions of social groups and differing beliefs in Cults of Prax is good fantasy reading even if you don't game at all."

Richard L. Snider reviewed Cults of Prax for Different Worlds magazine and stated that "I view the addition of social interaction mechanisms and a delineated cosmology to be integral to a complete fantasy campaign. Cult of Prax is the only published sourcebook of this type that gives these factors anywhere near their proper weight. I applaud both authors and the editors for their fine product."

In Issue 23 of White Dwarf, O.C. Macdonald commented, For those who are interested in RuneQuest, I cannot rate this book too highly, it makes an excellent, imaginative and highly playable FRP system into a masterpieces that richly deserves a place at the forefront of the hobby." MacDonald concluded by giving it an overall rating of 10 out of 10.

In a retrospective review of Cults of Prax in Black Gate, Michael O'Brien said "Written by gaming legends Steve Perrin, co-author of the RuneQuest RPG rules, and the late Greg Stafford, creator of the fantasy setting Glorantha, Cults of Prax's ground-breaking presentation of gods and how they interact with the world through those who worship them still makes it one of the most influential and important works ever released for the RuneQuest RPG, and indeed for tabletop roleplaying games in general."

In his 2023 book Monsters, Aliens, and Holes in the Ground, RPG historian Stu Horvath called this "the first splatbook ... a sourcebook that is not required for play but expands on or develops a specific aspect of the game world ... Cults of Prax is the first book that fits, retroactively, the established definition."
