= Griffin Island =

Mountain in Massachusetts, United States

- Location within Massachusetts Location within the United States

Highest point
- Elevation: 75 ft (23 m)
- Coordinates: 41°56′30″N 70°03′48″W

Geography
- Location: Cape Cod, Massachusetts
- Topo map: USGS Wellfleet

Griffin Island is a mountain in Barnstable County, Massachusetts. It is located on 1.7 miles (2.7 km) west-northwest of Wellfleet in the Town of Wellfleet. Great Beach Hill is located south of Griffin Island.
