= Steve Henderson (game designer) =

Role-playing game designer

- Born: 1944
- Died: March 8, 2006 (aged 61–62)
- Other names: Sir Steven MacEanruig
- Occupation: Game designer
- Organizations: Society for Creative Anachronism (SCA), DunDraCon
- Known for: Co-designing several role-playing games
- Notable work: RuneQuest, Worlds of Wonder, Superworld

Steve Henderson (1944 - March 8, 2006) was the co-designer of several role playing game titles and supplements.

== Career ==
Steve Henderson, Steve Perrin and Warren James, began working on an idea for an original role-playing game system for Glorantha, and were soon joined by Ray Turney from the original failed design team. Henderson's work includes RuneQuest, Worlds of Wonder and Superworld, and a partner in DunDraCon. He was one of the founders of the Society for Creative Anachronism (SCA), where he was known as Sir Steven MacEanruig.

He wrote the first RuneQuest adventure supplement, Balastor's Barracks with assistance from Steve Perrin and Warren James. The adventure is a dungeon crawl where the adventurers seek a powerful magic item as the primary quest. The adventure is intended as an introductory adventure for new players and game masters who are new to the RuneQuest system, providing practical demonstrations of many of the mechanics of this game system.

As Sir Steven MacEanruig, Henderson developed many techniques which advanced the state of the art of the martial arts as recreated in SCA armed combat. Among these were the development of dynamic fighting styles that feature fluid movement on the part of the combatant and coordinating footwork with the timing of sword-blows in such a way as to allow the combatant to deliver forceful blows without pausing in their movement. He was also one of the founders of the "BART" fighter practices (for "Bay Area Rapid Training") often held at the Rockridge BART station in Oakland, California. The BART practice has been the starting point for many people who participate in SCA combat, as well as serving as a laboratory for the improvement of training practices, and the development of combat recreation techniques to better and more safely simulate medieval combat.

Henderson was at the initial event of the SCA on May 1, 1966.

Henderson died on March 8, 2006, as the result of a stroke.
