= Ray Turney =

American game designer

- Occupation: Game designer

Ray Turney is a game designer who has worked primarily on role-playing games.

== Career ==
Hendrik Jan Pfeiffer, Art Turney and Ray Turney originally planned to publish information on the fictional world of Glorantha from White Bear and Red Moon as a supplement for Dungeons & Dragons, but Greg Stafford wanted an original role-playing game created for Glorantha. Ideas for an original gaming system for Glorantha came about during a conversation between Steve Perrin, Steve Henderson and Warren James at a Greyhaven party, and they were soon joined by Ray Turney from the original team.

Perrin and Turney designed RuneQuest which was published by Chaosium in 1978. The rules system for RuneQuest was created by Perrin, Turney, Henderson and James. Chaosium considered publishing Arduin in 1976, but found the game too complex and derivative of Dungeons & Dragons, and according to author Stu Horvath in 2023 "it took a couple of years before designers Steve Perrin and Ray Turney struck upon the right formula for the RPG that would become RuneQuest. The result was a radical departure from RPG norms."

== Works ==
- Creatures of Chaos 1: Scorpion Men & Broos (1978)
- Trolls & Trollkin (1978)
- Militia & Mercenaries (1979)
- RuneQuest Monsters (1987)
