= Charlie Krank =

American game designer

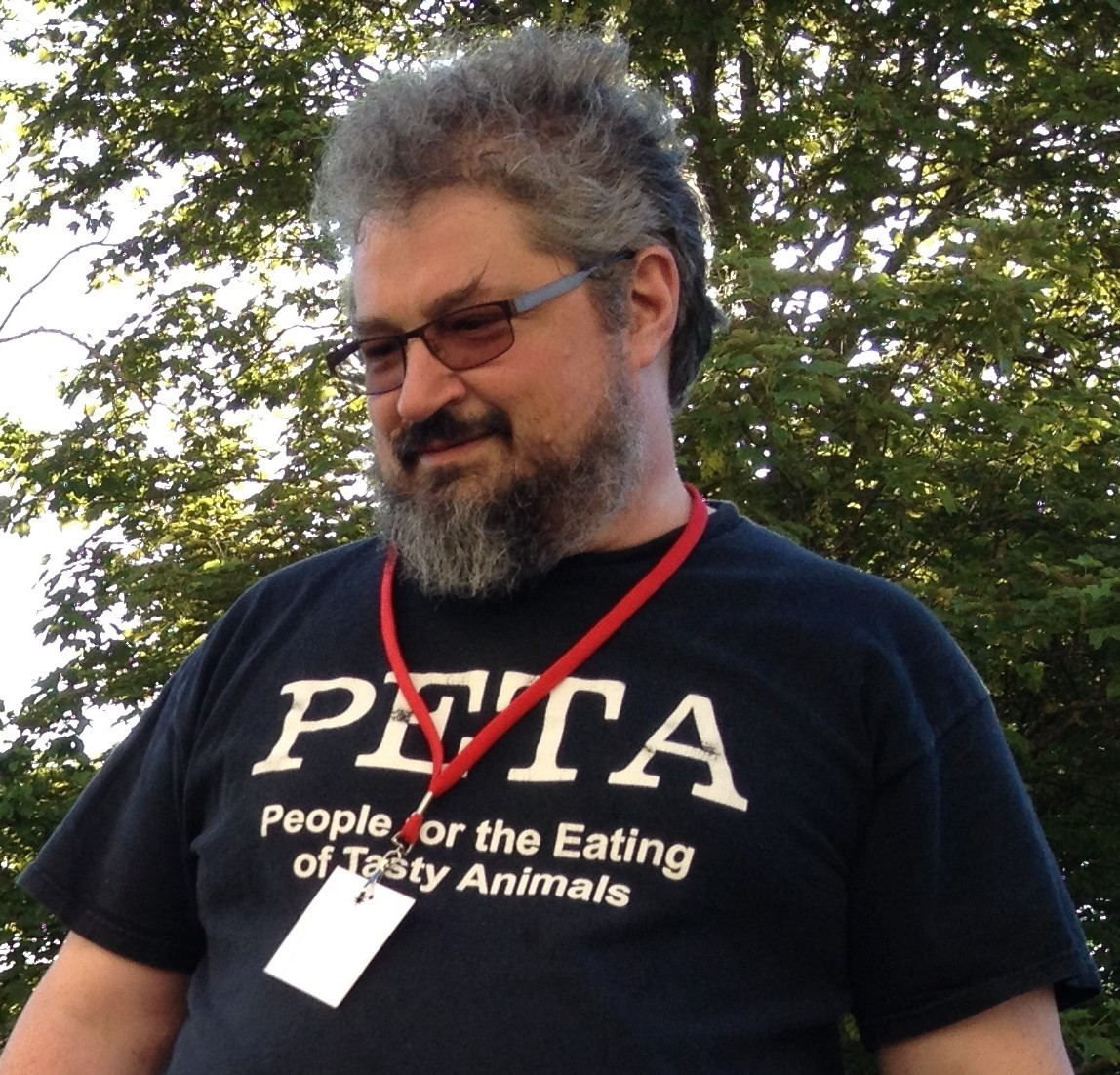
- Krank in 2016.
- Born: 1957 (age 68–69); San Francisco, California, United States
- Occupation: Game designer

Charlie Krank (born 1957) is a game designer who has worked primarily on role-playing games.

== Early life ==
Charlie Krank was born in 1957 in San Francisco. Charlie Krank worked as an employee at the San Francisco game store Gambit, when he began to volunteer to playtest for Chaosium in 1978.

== Career ==
In 1980, Krank was hired as a paid employee at Chaosium. Krank designed the collectible card game Mythos, which won the 1996 Best Card Game award at Origins. Krank was a long-time employee and part owner of Chaosium when Greg Stafford founded Issaries, Inc. and left the company after 25 years. Krank became the new president of Chaosium. Chaosium nearly shut down in 2003, but Krank ran the company out of his house for a time without any paid staff. In a forum posting of 3 June 2015, Sandy Petersen announced that Krank was no longer president of Chaosium.
