= Steve Perrin =

American game designer (1946–2021)

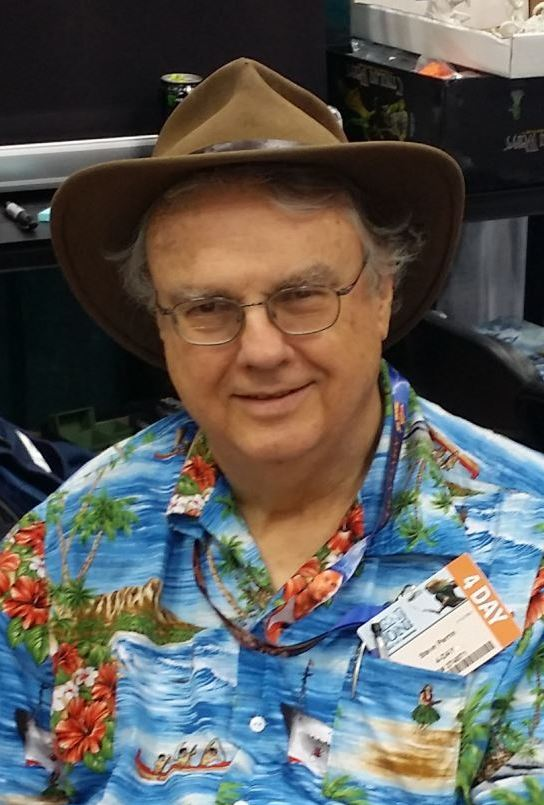
- Perrin at the 2018 Gen Con
- Born: Stephen Herbert Perrin; January 22, 1946
- Died: August 13, 2021 (aged 75)
- Occupations: Game designer, technical writer, editor
- Writing career
- Genre: Role-playing games
- Notable works: RuneQuest, Stormbringer, Call of Cthulhu

Stephen Herbert Perrin (January 22, 1946 – August 13, 2021) was an American game designer and technical writer/editor, best known for creating the tabletop role-playing game RuneQuest for Chaosium.

== Early life and education ==
Perrin earned a Bachelor of Arts in English from San Francisco State University. Perrin was a founding member in 1966 of the Society for Creative Anachronism (SCA).

== Early career and Chaosium ==
One of his first contributions to the world of RPGs was "The Perrin Conventions" in 1976, an alternative set of combat rules for Dungeons & Dragons, which led to his work on RuneQuest. Perrin wanted more involvement in the role-playing game industry, and with Jeff Pimper he talked to Chaosium about developing a creature book based on Dungeons & Dragons, which they published as All the Worlds' Monsters (1977), and was released before the Monster Manual from TSR. Perrin later worked with Steve Henderson and Warren James on an idea for an original gaming system to be used with the world of Glorantha after a previous design team failed to produce a supplement to an existing game, and Ray Turney from the original team soon joined them; this new RPG was finally published in 1978 as RuneQuest.

Perrin officially joined Chaosium in 1981, although he only stayed with the company for a few years. He was one of several authors who contributed to their licensed Thieves' World (1981) supplement. Perrin designed Worlds of Wonder (1982), which was the third game released by Chaosium using their Basic Role-Playing system (BRP). Superworld was originally one of worlds designed for Worlds of Wonder and was then published as its own game in 1983, although it was merely moderately successful and Perrin later admitted its similarity to Champions from Hero Games. In 1984, he wrote the BRP-based Elfquest, based on the Elfquest comic book. While at Chaosium he also created Stormbringer, and contributed to Call of Cthulhu.

== Later career ==
Hero Games published its sixth RPG, Robot Warriors (1986), by Perrin. He also wrote the 1987 Champions role-playing game supplement The Voice of Doom.

He worked at Interplay Productions, Maxis, and Spectrum Holobyte, doing game design, playtesting, and writing manuals for such computer games as Mechanized Assault & Exploration, Star Trek: Starfleet Academy, and Descent to Undermountain. He also worked freelance for many of the major companies in the games industry including TSR, FASA, Hero Games, West End Games, and Iron Crown Enterprises.

Steve Perrin's Quest Rules (SPQR) was sold independently through Chaos Limited. In 2004, he collaborated with Taldren on Black 9 Ops, which Perrin decided to make available for free.

In 2010, Perrin began creating PDF adventures for the games Icons and Mutants & Masterminds, and completed several scenarios for Vigilance Press and Fainting Goat Press. In 2019, he returned to Chaosium as a creative consultant. In 2020, he contributed to the Wild Cards novel American Hero.

On August 13, 2021, Chaosium announced Perrin's death.
