= Sandy Petersen =

American game designer (born 1955)

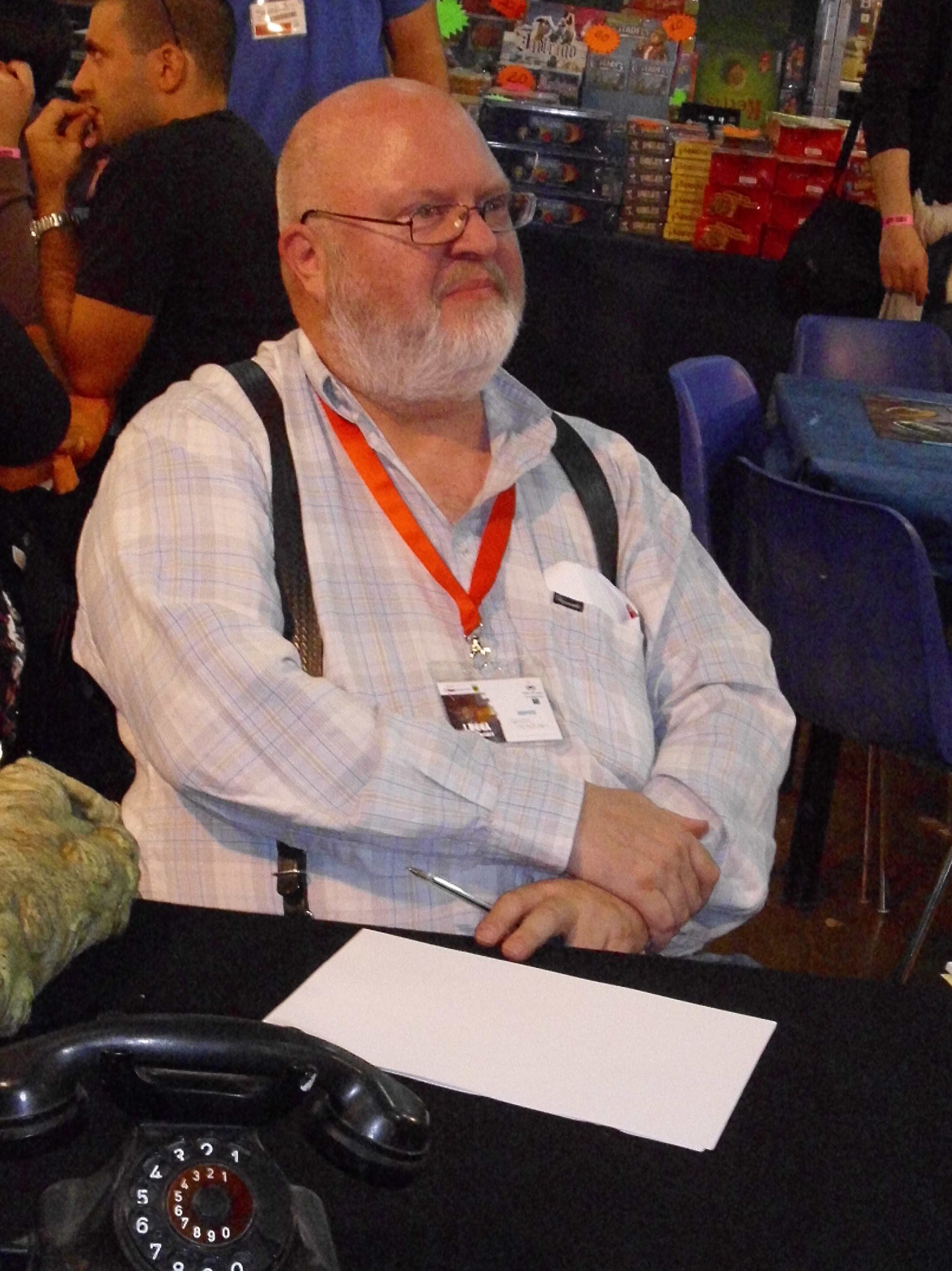
- Petersen at Lucca Comics & Games 2011
- Born: Carl Sanford Joslyn Petersen; September 16, 1955 (age 71); St. Louis, Missouri, U.S.
- Occupation: Game designer
- Years active: 1980 - present
- Notable work: Call of Cthulhu (1981); Doom (1993); Doom II (1994); Quake (1996)

Carl Sanford Joslyn "Sandy" Petersen (born September 16, 1955) is an American game designer. He worked at Chaosium, contributing to the development of RuneQuest and creating the horror role-playing game Call of Cthulhu. He later joined id Software where he worked on the development of the Doom franchise and Quake. As part of Ensemble Studios, Petersen contributed to the Age of Empires franchise.

== Biography ==
Petersen was born in St. Louis, Missouri and developed a love for dinosaurs at age 3. He studied zoology at Brigham Young University and later attended the University of California, Berkeley, majoring in entomology.

Petersen started role-playing when TSR first released Dungeons & Dragons, playing the first edition with friends in 1974. In 1978, when RuneQuest was published by Chaosium, Sandy switched to RuneQuest as his primary game, instead.

Petersen is a practicing member of the Church of Jesus Christ of Latter-day Saints, but sees no conflict between his faith and his design of games involving Satanic elements. While working on Doom, he said to John Romero, "I have no problems with the demons in the game. They're just cartoons. And, anyway, they're the bad guys."

== Career ==
Over a career spanning more than four decades, he has served as author, designer, developer, or producer on more than 100 published games, with combined sales exceeding 36 million copies. He invented a substantial portion of the established canon within the modern Cthulhu Mythos.

He has received more than 70 industry awards, including induction into the Origins Game Designer Hall of Fame, and was voted "Favorite Designer" in the 1994 Gamer's Choice Awards—an honor given annually to a single recipient selected by fan vote.

== Work ==
=== Chaosium ===
After a friend encouraged Petersen to write to Greg Stafford with ideas for new RuneQuest material, the two quickly became friends. In 1980, Sandy's first publication, the Gateway Bestiary, was released. This RuneQuest bestiary featured a section on giant insects—reflecting his graduate studies in entomology—as well as a section on Lovecraftian monsters, marking the first appearance of Lovecraft creatures in any role-playing game.

Between 1979 and 1981, Petersen wrote or contributed to numerous Chaosium publications, including substantial collaboration with Greg Stafford on the Trollpak for RuneQuest.

Petersen became a full-time staff member at Chaosium in 1982. His interest for role-playing games and H. P. Lovecraft were fused when he became principal author of Chaosium's game Call of Cthulhu, published 1981, and many scenarios and background pieces thereafter.

He authored several RuneQuest supplements for Avalon Hill and Games Workshop. Petersen served as co-designer for West End Games's Ghostbusters role-playing game. When developing the Ghostbusters game, Sandy created the "dice pool" mechanic, still widely used in tabletop role-playing games.

Between 1981 and 1988 Petersen worked on more than 50 publications by Chaosium: he was involved to some extent in almost every game release by Chaosium during those years. His main areas of focus however, were Call of Cthulhu and RuneQuest.

=== MicroProse ===
Petersen worked some time for video game company MicroProse, where he worked on Sid Meier's Pirates!, Civilization, and Sword of the Samurai. Between 1989 and 1993 he worked on more MicroProse video games including Darklands, Hyperspeed, and Lightspeed. Petersen was laid off in 1993 and was jobless for five months. He considered that period as one of the worst times of his life.

Sandy was on the team which developed Sid Meier's Civilization. One of his contributions was to make unemployed people appear as "Elvis", and that you can change them to be "Einsteins" instead. He has stated in multiple interviews that Lightspeed (and its sequel Hyperspeed) is the only game in his entire career as an employee, when he was allowed to freely choose the game's theme and create its universe from whole cloth.

=== Id Software ===
Petersen was hired by id Software in August 1993. During his interview, John Romero introduced him to DoomEd and simply asked him to build a level. Romero was ultimately happy with the results, so Petersen was brought on to production for Doom. The level from Petersen's interview eventually became "E2M6". He was a fast level designer and produced all maps for the third episode of Doom, Inferno. Petersen designed 20 of the 27 levels in Doom and 17 levels of the 32 for Doom II. An 18th, "Dead Simple", was redesigned by American McGee before release.

In interviews Sandy frequently repeats that the design of Doom and Doom II were group efforts, and even the artists and programmers contributed. For example, he credits John Carmack with suggesting to him the idea of using the rocket launcher on yourself to find the secret exit in map E3M6.

Petersen considered his main job at id was to make the game fun. Beyond designing the majority of levels for the first two Doom games, he determined the names for demons, items, degrees of difficulty and levels and determined map order. He wrote the text of the Doom manuals although the original story idea for Doom is credited to Tom Hall. He also wrote the text that appears between levels and at the end of game, as well as the text which appears when you pick up items or exit the game. He also suggested to the team to modify the BFG 9000's such that it became a smart bomb instead of an upgraded plasma gun which is what it was prior to release.

Petersen was then involved with The Ultimate Doom in 1995 as well as the R&D phase for Quake. At the time, Quake was based on an id staff D&D campaign. Petersen was enthusiastic about the project, though he had not been a player in the original campaign as it was before his arrival at the company. With id Software's designers waiting for the Quake engine to be ready for its design team, the studio sent Petersen to work temporarily at Rogue Entertainment, which was licensing the Doom engine to develop Strife. Romero also credits Petersen with coming up with the title for the Hexen expansion Deathkings of the Dark Citadel. When Quake was reformulated as a first-person shooter in late 1995, id removed Petersen from the Strife team to focus on the game. The revised Quake storyline is credited to Petersen, along with seven levels.

Beyond writing the storyline, Petersen played a major role in incorporating Lovecraftian and Cthulhu Mythos elements into Quake, including naming the final boss Shub-Niggurath and creating the Shamblers and Spawn, whose designs were inspired by creatures depicted in S. Petersen's Field Guide to Cthulhu Monsters.

Late in Quake's development, tensions arose among several key members of the id Software team, ultimately leading to the departure of John Romero. Petersen considered Romero the colleague he was closest to at id, and his exit had a profound impact on him. By June of the following year, Petersen chose to resign as well. Before leaving, he successfully advocated for the hiring of his friend Jennell Jaquays (then Paul) as his replacement.

=== Ensemble Studios ===
Petersen left id Software for Ensemble Studios in June 1997. There, he worked as a game designer on several of their Age of Empires titles, including Rise of Rome, Age of Kings, and The Conquerors. During this time, he was a frequent poster on the HeavenGames forums under the username ES_Sandyman. He ran a popular series of threads, "Ask Sandyman", where forum members could ask him about anything they wanted.

Petersen served as lead designer on all three Age of Empires expansion packs—Rise of Rome, The Conquerors, and The WarChiefs. Across the core Age of Empires series (Age of Empires I, II, and III), his primary responsibilities included designing the single-player campaigns, writing the scripts for the computer-player AI, overseeing unit and civilization balance, and creating the unique units for each civilization.

=== Other works ===
Petersen frequently appears as guest of honor for industry conventions in the US, Europe, Australia, and Japan. He has never charged a fee to be a guest of honor or to contribute to seminars, speaking engagements or to run games and events.

Petersen was the executive producer for the 2011 film The Whisperer in Darkness. It was produced by H.P. Lovecraft Historical Society Motion Pictures in the style of a 1930s black and white horror film.

In April 2011, he served as the publisher of horror magazine Arcane: Penny Dreadfuls for the 21st Century.

Petersen took a professorship at The Guildhall at SMU in 2009 following the closure of Ensemble Studios, where he taught several courses on game design.

Petersen co-designed the design curriculum at The Guildhall with Jennell Jaquays. He also taught the central game design principles course that all Guildhall students must take (whether they be designers, artists, coders, or producers).

After only 2 years Sandy became disillusioned with the nature of the bureaucracy in higher education and left SMU.

Petersen worked at Barking Lizards Technologies as their creative director, after leaving The Guildhall, and worked on their iOS release Osiris Legends.

In mid-2013, Petersen led a successful Kickstarter campaign by his company, Green Eye Games, to produce the boardgame Cthulhu Wars. Over US$1,400,000 was raised achieving over 3,500% of the initial target. This success allowed the creation of more figures (60), map expansions and additional scenario options. Green Eye Games also produced the unsuccessful Kickstarter campaign for Cthulhu World Combat (iOS, Android, Windows, PSN, Xbox Live).

In June 2015, it was announced that Petersen and Greg Stafford returned to Chaosium Inc. Petersen retired from the board in 2019, and now runs his own game company.

Petersen runs a website, Petersen Games, where he had sold various tabletop games, often based on his work with Call of Cthulhu. As part of his ongoing work with Call of Cthulhu content he has published sourcebooks for Dungeons and Dragons 5e, Pathfinder, and Pathfinder 2e. Those books adapt the Cthulhu mythos for those systems to allow for several mythos-based player character options, many monsters, new insanity rules, and much more. He can also be regularly seen on his YouTube channel, "Sandy of Cthulhu," where he speaks on subjects such as boardgames, roleplay adventures, his own personal works, his time with Id Software, tips on gameplay, advice on game design, authors, Lovecraftian horror, movies, and his love of fiction in general.

In 2024 he partnered with Quimbly's Toys and Games. to continue publishing his games. As of March, 2025, this partnership has ended and his company, Petersen Games once again publishes and sells games directly.

Post-2015, Petersen focused heavily on board game design, particularly titles inspired by the Cthulhu Mythos. Significant releases include Cthulhu Wars (2015), Theomachy (2016), Orcs Must Die! (2016), Dicenstein (2017), Evil High Priest (2018), The Gods War (2018), Hyperspace (2019), and Planet Apocalypse (2020). Petersen Games, his company, continues producing expansions and new titles, often with family involvement.

Petersen's earlier work on Doom (1993–1994) remains a point of public discussion, with a 2025 report highlighting an ongoing social media dispute with John Romero regarding credit for the original story. He also contributed to Age of Empires II: The Conquerors (1999), particularly in level design and historical content. In recent reflections, Petersen shared that Microsoft's forced addition of Koreans to the game led to historical inaccuracies and controversy in South Korea.

Petersen emphasizes investigative gameplay over combat in games inspired by Lovecraft's mythos, a principle that shaped Call of Cthulhu and continues to influence his board games. He remains active in public events, including the Celsius 232 festival in Avilés (2025), where he demonstrated gameplay, shared design insights, and played alongside fans.

== Credits ==
=== Video games ===
Year	Title	Developer	Notes
1989	Sword of the Samurai	MicroProse	
1989	Sid Meier's Pirates!	MicroProse	Atari ST version
1990	Lightspeed	MicroProse	
1990	Command HQ	MicroProse	
1991	Civilization (1991)	MicroProse	
1991	Hyperspeed	MicroProse	
1992	Darklands	MicroProse	
1993	Doom	id Software	
1994	Dragonsphere	MicroProse	
1994	Wolfenstein 3D	id Software	Atari Jaguar version
1994	Doom II: Hell on Earth	id Software	
1995	The Ultimate Doom	id Software	
1996	Quake	id Software	
1996	Hexen: Beyond Heretic	Raven Software	Sega Saturn and PlayStation versions
1996	Final Doom	TeamTNT	
1997	Quake II	id Software	Uncredited
1997	Doom 64	Midway Studios San Diego	
1997	Age of Empires	Ensemble Studios	
1998	Age of Empires: The Rise of Rome	Ensemble Studios	
1999	Age of Empires II	Ensemble Studios	
2000	Age of Empires II: The Conquerors	Ensemble Studios	
2002	Age of Mythology	Ensemble Studios	
2003	Age of Mythology: The Titans	Ensemble Studios	
2005	Age of Empires III	Ensemble Studios	
2006	Age of Empires III: The WarChiefs	Ensemble Studios	
2009	Halo Wars	Ensemble Studios	
2011	Osiris Legends	Barking Lizard Studios	
2018	Call of Cthulhu	Cyanide	
2025	Wartorn	Stray Kite Studios	

=== Role-playing games ===
- Call of Cthulhu (1981)
- Ghostbusters (1986)

==== Additional content for other role-playing games ====
Dungeons and Dragons 5th edition
Sandy Petersen's Cthulhu Mythos for 5e (2019, ISBN 978-0-9995390-4-0)
Pathfinder
Sandy Petersen's Cthulhu Mythos for Pathfinder - 1st Edition (2016, ISBN 978-0-9995390-0-2)
Pathfinder 2nd Edition
Sandy Petersen's Cthulhu Mythos for Pathfinder 2nd Edition (2021, ISBN 9781950982288)

=== Board games ===
- Cthulhu Wars (2015)
- Theomachy (2016)
- Orcs Must Die! (2016)
- Dicenstein (2017)
- Evil High Priest (2018)
- The Gods War (2018)
- Hyperspace (2019)
- Planet Apocalypse (2020)

=== Films ===
- The Whisperer In Darkness (2011)

=== Other projects ===
==== Chaosium ====
===== Games =====
- Call of Cthulhu 1981
- Superworld 1982
- Larry Niven's Ringworld 1984
- Elfquest 1984
- Runequest III 1984
- Hawkmoon 1986
- Ghostbusters 1986
- Stormbringer 3^{rd} edition 1987
- Arkham Horror 1987

== Awards ==
Since 2015, Petersen has continued to receive recognition for his contributions to role-playing games. Notably, Horror on the Orient Express won the ENnie Awards for Best Adventure (Gold) and Best Production Values (Silver) and was nominated for Product of the Year in 2015. The same year, The Guide to Glorantha received a Silver ENnie for Best Cartography, was nominated for Product of the Year, and won the Diana Jones Award for Excellence in Gaming. In 2024, Call of Cthulhu was inducted into the ENnie Awards Hall of Fame, cementing its status as a foundational RPG.

- 1982 – Origins Award: Best Role Playing Game (Call of Cthulhu)
- 1986 – H.G. Wells Award (Origins): Best Role Playing Rules (Ghostbusters)
- 1988 – Origins Award: Best Fantasy Boardgame (Arkham Horror)
- 1990 – Origins Award: Hall of Fame (Sandy Petersen)
- 1992 – Computer Gaming World: Game of the Year (Sid Meier's Civilization)
- 1994 – PC Gamer UK: Game of the Year (Doom)
- 1995 – Origins Award: Hall of Fame (Call of Cthulhu)
- 1999 – GameSpot: Strategy Game of the Year (Age of Empires 2)
- 2014 – Lovecraft Film Festival: The Howie, for outstanding lifetime achievement in promoting the works of H. P. Lovecraft (Sandy Petersen)
- 2018 – Tabletop Gaming Magazine: Ranked 3rd in "Top 150 Greatest Games of All Time" (Call of Cthulhu)

== Criticism ==
In August of 2026, Petersen fell under heavy criticism after he was hired to be the spokesperson for a blockchain based game called "DOOMSol" and advertised it on his social media accounts. Many were quick to identify DOOMSol as a scam and copyright infringement. As of October 2026, the website for DOOMSol has been taken down.

== Works cited ==
- Appelcline, Shannon (2011). Designers & Dragons. Mongoose Publishing. ISBN 978-1-907702-58-7.
- Kushner, David (2003). Masters of Doom: How Two Guys Created an Empire and Transformed Pop Culture. Random House. ISBN 0375505245.
- Petersen, Sandy (2007). "Up Front". In Lowder, James (ed.). Hobby Games: The 100 Best. Green Ronin Publishing. ISBN 978-1-932442-96-0.
- Romero, John (2023). DOOM Guy: Life in First Person. Abrams Press. ISBN 978-1419758119.
