= RuneQuest =

Fantasy tabletop role-playing game

- RuneQuest Deluxe Edition, box cover illustration by Jody Lee, 1983
- Designers: Steve Perrin; Ray Turney; Steve Henderson; Warren James; Glorantha Material by Greg Stafford
- Publishers: Chaosium; Avalon Hill; Mongoose Publishing; The Design Mechanism
- Publication: 1978 1st edition (The Chaosium); 1979 2nd edition (The Chaosium); 1984 3rd edition (Avalon Hill); 2006 RuneQuest (Mongoose); 2010 RuneQuest II (Mongoose); 2012 6th edition (The Design Mechanism); 2018 RuneQuest: Roleplaying in Glorantha (Chaosium)
- Genres: Fantasy
- Systems: Basic Role-Playing

RuneQuest (commonly abbreviated as RQ) is a fantasy tabletop role-playing game originally designed by Steve Perrin, Ray Turney, Steve Henderson, and Warren James, and set in Greg Stafford's mythical world of Glorantha. It was first published in 1978 by The Chaosium. Beginning in 1984, publication passed between a number of companies, including Avalon Hill, Mongoose Publishing, and The Design Mechanism, before finally returning to Chaosium in 2016. RuneQuest is notable for its system, designed around percentile dice and an early implementation of skill rules, which became the basis for numerous other games. There have been several editions of the game.

== History ==
In 1975, game designer Greg Stafford released the fantasy board game White Bear and Red Moon (later renamed Dragon Pass), produced and marketed by The Chaosium, a publishing company set up by Stafford specifically for the release of the game. In 1978, The Chaosium published the first edition of RuneQuest, a role-playing game set in the world of Glorantha which Stafford had created for White Bear and Red Moon.

A second edition, with various minor revisions, was released in 1979. RuneQuest quickly established itself as the second most popular fantasy role-playing game after Dungeons & Dragons. In the four years before the second edition was superseded, Chaosium published over twenty supplements to support it. The second edition and its supplements were republished as part of the 2015 RuneQuest Classic Kickstarter.

In order to increase distribution and marketing of the game, Chaosium made a deal with Avalon Hill, who published the third edition in 1984. Under the agreement, Avalon Hill took ownership of trademark for RuneQuest, while all Glorantha-related content required approval by Chaosium, who also retained the copyright of the rules text. As such, the default setting for the third edition was the "Dark Ages of fantasy Europe", but it also included a booklet allowing play in Glorantha. A range of supplements were produced for this edition; generic fantasy was left unbranded, but others were marked as Earth, Glorantha, or Gateway (alternative fantasy) to differentiate them. The third edition was not well-received — RPG historian Stu Horvath called it "an ill-fated third edition of the game that never made the kind of money on which both companies were banking."

A proposed fourth edition developed by Avalon Hill, titled RuneQuest: Adventures in Glorantha, was intended to return the tight RuneQuest/Glorantha relationship, but it was shelved mid-project in 1994 after Stafford refused permission, unhappy with Avalon Hill's stewardship of the third edition. In response, Avalon Hill, as owners of the trademark, began development of a mechanically unrelated game originally titled RuneQuest: Slayers. However, when Avalon Hill was acquired by Hasbro in 1998, the project was canceled despite being near completion. The copyrights to the rules reverted to the authors, who released it for free as RuneSlayers.

In 1998, following the financial failure of the collectible card game Mythos, Stafford, along with fellow shareholder Sandy Petersen, left the management of Chaosium (though they remained shareholders in the company). Stafford had formed a subsidiary company, Issaries, Inc., to manage the Glorantha property and took ownership of that company with him. He partnered with Robin D. Laws to publish an all-new game system set in Glorantha called Hero Wars in 2000. It was later renamed HeroQuest in 2003 after the rights to that name, along with the RuneQuest trademark, were acquired from Hasbro by Issaries.

Mongoose Publishing released a new edition of RuneQuest in August 2006 under a license from Issaries. This required that Mongoose recreate much of the function of prior editions without reusing the prior texts (the copyrights of which were retained by Chaosium). The new rules were developed by a team led by Mongoose co-founder Matthew Sprange, and were released under the Open Game License. The official setting takes place during the Second Age of Glorantha (previous editions covered the Third Age).

In January 2010, Mongoose published a much-revised edition written by Pete Nash and Lawrence Whitaker called RuneQuest II, simply known as "MRQ2" by fans. In May 2011, Mongoose Publishing announced that they had parted company with Issaries, and announced the rebranding of RuneQuest II as Legend. Legend was released in late 2011 under the Open Gaming License. Mongoose titles for RuneQuest II were re-released as Legend-compatible books.

In July 2011, The Design Mechanism, a company formed by Nash and Whitaker, announced that they had entered a licensing agreement with Issaries and would be producing a 6th edition of RuneQuest. Released in July 2012, it was largely an expansion of Mongoose's RuneQuest II and aimed at providing rules that could be adapted to many fantasy or historical settings, and did not contain any specifically Gloranthan content (though it did use the Gloranthan runes).

In 2013, Stafford sold Issaries outright, and with it the Glorantha setting and RuneQuest and HeroQuest trademarks, to Moon Design Publications, which had published the second edition of HeroQuest under license in 2009. Moon Design maintained the Design Mechanism's RuneQuest license.

In June 2015, following a series of financial issues at Chaosium, Stafford and Petersen retook control of the company. They in turn arranged a merger with Moon Design, which saw the Moon Design management team take over Chaosium. In 2015 they successfully raised funds through Kickstarter to produce a hardcover reprint of the second edition and PDFs of its supplements as RuneQuest Classic.

In 2016, it was announced that The Design Mechanism had parted ways with Moon Design and that RuneQuest 6th edition would continue to be published under the name Mythras. Shortly thereafter a new edition, RuneQuest: Roleplaying in Glorantha, was announced in 2017. It is based heavily on the Chaosium second edition, drawing upon ideas from later editions. The new edition of the game, officially referred to as RQG for short, was previewed on Free RPG Day 2017 with the release of a quickstart module. The PDF of the full rules was released in May 2018, with the printed book following later that year. Since then there have been a steady stream of products released for RQG, including a Bestiary, books of adventures and reference material.

== System ==
RuneQuest has developed in many different ways over its 40-year history. This section focuses on the current edition RuneQuest Glorantha (RQG).

=== Character creation ===
As with most RPGs, players begin by making an adventurer. Starting by creating a family history, adventurers are then developed through a number of dice rolls to represent physical, mental and spiritual characteristics.

RuneQuest adventurers gain power as they are used in play, but not to the degree that they do in other fantasy RPGs. It is still possible for a weak adventurer to slay a strong one through luck, tactics, or careful planning.

=== Task resolution ===
Tasks are resolved using three basic systems, simple, opposed, or resistance rolls. All three use a roll-under percentile system to determine success of actions. Bonuses can increase or decrease the target number. Success or failure is further subdivided into categories, derived from the target number:

- Critical success (1/20 of target number)
- Special success (1/5 of target number)
- Success (target number or less)
- Failure (above the target number and specifically 96-100)
- Fumble (1/20 of target number and specifically 100).

For example, if a character has climbing target of 35% and his player rolls 25 on a D100, the character has succeeded. If they had rolled 01, that would be a critical success, rolling 06, a special success, and 85, a failure.

==== Combat ====
The game's combat system was designed in an attempt to recreate live-action combat. Perrin was familiar with mock medieval combat through the Society for Creative Anachronism.

In RQG, as in most previous editions, a combat round is divided into Strike Ranks, which provide an initiative system based on the character's dexterity, size and weapon. These are assessed sequentially. An attacking character will roll their skill, and if successful the defender has the option of parrying or dodging the attack.

The RuneQuest combat system has a subsystem for hit location. Successful attacks are normally allocated randomly (or can be aimed) to a part of the target's body. In RuneQuest, a hit against a character's leg, weapon arm, or head has specific effects on the game's mechanics and narrative. This was an innovative part of the game's combat system and helped to separate it from the more abstracted, hit-point-based combat of competitors such as Dungeons & Dragons.

=== Advancement ===
Rules for skill advancement also use percentile dice. In a departure from the level-based advancement of Dungeons & Dragons, RuneQuest allows characters to improve their abilities directly; the player needs to roll higher than the character's skill rating. For the climber example used earlier, the player would need to roll greater than 35 on a D100 in order to advance the character's skill. Thus, the better the adventurer is at a skill the more difficult it is to improve.

=== Magic ===
Adventurers in RuneQuest are not divided into those who do use magic and those who do not. At the time of the game's release, this was an unorthodox mechanic.

Although all adventurers have access to magic, for practical game balance purposes, an adventurer's magical strength is proportional to his or her connection to the divine or natural skill at sorcery. One of the innovations of RQG is that characters all have connections to the various runes of Glorantha, and these are used in the casting of magic. For instance, to cast an Ignite spell, creating a fire, the player would need to roll under his fire rune affinity.

The exact divisions of magic vary from edition to edition; RQG addresses spirit magic, rune magic, and sorcery. Other forms, such as dragon magic, exist but are not normally available to adventurers.

=== Other rules ===
The RuneQuest bestiary contains a large selection of fantasy monsters and their physical stats. As well as traditional fantasy staples (dwarves, trolls, undead, lycanthropes, etc.), the book contains original creatures such as goat-headed creatures called broo, and the headless three armed giants called maidstone archers. Some of its traditional fantasy creatures differed notably from the versions from other games (or fantasy or traditional sources); for example, elves are humanoid plant life. Unlike other fantasy RPGs of the time, RuneQuest encouraged the use of monsters as adventurers.

== Setting ==
The setting included for the current, and all but one of the previous editions has been the world of Glorantha. The well-developed background of the setting offers a breadth of material for players and game masters to draw from. At a time when many RPG settings were cobbled together, RuneQuest offered players a vibrant living world, giving them a much more developed fictional world with established geography, history, and religion.

=== The Dragon Pass area ===
This region of Glorantha is the default setting for RuneQuest adventures. Set on the northern continent, it consists of five homelands each with their own distinctive cultures: Sartar, Prax, Old Tarsh, Lunar Tarsh and the Grazelands. The whole area is extended upland, with several passes through the surrounding mountains, each leading to different regions. This, together with its regional history, has led to a "melting pot" of cultures, with unusually-high variety and concentration of non-human species, particularly for a largely-rural setting. This combination of geography and culture creates the backdrop of the Hero Wars, the original setting for the Dragon Pass board game that RuneQuest was created for.

=== Cults and religion ===
A key element of RuneQuest's flavor is an adventurer's membership of religious societies. Referred to as cults, these usually have three levels of membership. Lay members are informal members with no insight in to the true nature of the cult. Initiates are directly connected to a god or greater power of the cult. They received magic in return. Rune levels are priestly, martial leaders or shaman, working for the god's ideals and goals.

The basic rules describe 21 cults, whose availability is related to an adventurer's rune affinities, homeland, and occupation.

== Supplements ==
All editions of RuneQuest have had supplements published for them.

== Reception ==
In the September–October 1978 edition of The Space Gamer (Issue No. 19), Dana Holm commented that "Since this game contains a logical system, almost anything can be added to the matrix it presents. A gem of a game. You won't be disappointed."

In the February–March 1979 edition of White Dwarf (Issue 11), Jim Donohoe thought the rulebook was "116 pages of well thought-out and comprehensive rules," but he found the character generation system "quite complex." He advised new referees to use the monster loot tables with caution, since the treasure was randomly generated, which meant "the amount of treasure a monster can have can vary wildly using these tables, and a weak monster can have a fortune while a tough one is impoverished. This is one area of the rules which could use some revision." He concluded by giving the game an excellent rating of 9 out of 10, saying, "These are a set of rules which I can recommend as a good alternative to Dungeons & Dragons. Using the Runequest rules, a campaign can be set up simply and quickly with little effort to the referee."

In the March 1980 edition of Ares (Issue #1), Greg Costikyan commented that "RuneQuest is the most playable and elegant fantasy role-playing designed to date. Its only drawback is that it does not cover enough ground for a full-scale role-playing campaign, and is, perhaps, a bit simpler than experienced frp'ers would desire." He concluded by giving it a slightly better than average rating of 7 out of 9.

In the July 1980 issue of Ares, Eric Goldberg reviewed the second edition and commented "When RQ came out, it was well-organized by the FRP standards of that time. The rules are not painful to read, and a second edition, in which the charts are easier to find, has helped matters considerably. The drawbacks of the game are that the foundation of the game (combat) has play problems and that the individual systems do not mesh together as nicely as one would hope. Among the strengths are its freshness of design concepts, the elimination of the odious 'level' progressions for characters, and the detailed background."

In the 1980 book The Complete Book of Wargames, game designer Jon Freeman liked the rulebook, calling it "coherent, understandable, and full of examples to illustrate." However, Freeman major issue with "the cumbersome combat system, which is more realistic than most but rather tedious." He also noted that the world of Glorantha was quite dense and hard to comprehend for new players. And if enterprising gamemasters wished to borrow the best parts of the setting for use in other role-playing systems, Freeman thought this would be very difficult: "the systems are too well integrated ... To a great extent this means the game must be adopted entirely or not at all." Freeman concluded by giving this game an Overall Evaluation of "Good to Very Good"

In the July 1981 edition of The Space Gamer (Issue No. 35), Forrest Johnson reviewed the 1980 boxed edition of RuneQuest, and commented "An experienced gamer, who probably bought the rules separately [...] has no need of this edition. However, it might be of use to a newcomer."

In Issue 35 of Different Worlds, Jeff Okamoto commented "Overall, I would have to say that the third edition rules are complete and realistic. They are slightly more complex than before, but not remarkably so. From the beginning of my playtesting, I had no real doubts that the rules would turn out well. If we did not like a certain portion, we would always talk about it and change it if we could argue our point."

In the April 1985 edition of White Dwarf (Issue 64), Oliver Dickinson reviewed the third edition produced by Avalon Hill, and found "Everything is well laid out and clearly expressed." The major difference he found with previous editions of rules was that most items "cost a great deal more [...] Acquiring good armour, magic items, etc is going to be more of a struggle and so, I feel, more satisfying. I hope this will bring the days of the overmighty PC/NPC to an end; but the difficulties may be precisely what put some players off." Dickinson concluded by giving the new edition an excellent rating of 9 out of 10, saying, "the revised rules deserve a proper trial; they are well thought out and explained, though quite complex, and I suspect will in many cases be welcomed with the words, 'That makes better sense!'"

In Issue 33 of Abyss, Dave Nalle liked a lot of things in the third edition produced by Avalon Hill, especially the delinking from the world of Glorantha — Nalle felt that providing an entire world to players gave the first and second editions "a stifling rigidity [that] discouraged players who did not want to play a game so closely linked to a world that did not match their playing style." Nalle also liked the extensive rules, pointing out "If you could conceivably need to know it, it is here somewhere." However, Nalle felt the game was being pitched to too young an audience, and he found problems with the Skill system. Nalle concluded that the third edition was "a touched up version of a classic game with as many bad changes as good changes and plenty of the old problems still intact. RuneQuest 3 is verbose and condescending, mechanically out of date and seems to have given up on character development and role-playing in favor of hack and slash power gaming."

In Issue 41 of Different Worlds, Steve List reviewed the third edition published by Avalon Hill and stated, "The new RuneQuest is a creation of a lot of people who put diligence and care into the effort. Physically, it is extremely nice (except for the scarcity of pre-printed or easily reproducible character sheets), on the whole lucidly written, largely free of ambiguities and errors. On the negative side are the sheer size of it, somewhat daunting to those unfamiliar with the system, while the de-emphasis of commonly held magic and the world of Glorantha may diminish its appeal to those used to the earlier edition." List concluded, "It remains, however, just about the best fantasy role-playing game available."

Oliver Dickinson reviewed RuneQuest 3 for White Dwarf #75, and stated that "Personally, I take very seriously Greg Stafford's comment that RQ3 reflects his conception of Glorantha better, and I welcome most of the changes and innovations, particularly Fatigue Points."

In the March 1987 edition of White Dwarf (Issue 87), Peter Green reviewed a new hardcover version of the third edition, and generally liked it, although he did find "a few irritations", notably that reference was made to sections of the first or second edition rules that no longer existed. He concluded by warning that "beginners should perhaps leave it until they are familiar with a more introductory system [...] Experienced players of other games will find much in Runequest to recommend it [...] it is superb value and well worth getting even if you never intend to play it."

In Issue 8 of Adventurer, Ste Dillon reviewed RuneQuest 3 and pointed out "The difference between [RuneQuest] and the Avalon-Hill RQIII is obvious; it has been genericised – it no longer pretends to be for 'Fantasy Europe' or 'Glorantha'; it's just a game system for games players. I like it, and I think it will be a lot more beneficial to those FRPers looking for another game system than GW's own hybrid, Warhammer. It's cheaper and it's a far nicer production." Dillon concluded, "Congratulations to all involved with it."

In the August 1987 edition of White Dwarf (Issue 92), Paul Cockburn reviewed Advanced Runequest, a streamlined version of the third edition rules, and liked what he saw. He concluded, "It's a very good package [...] a very powerful roleplaying game, in a very accessible form."

The Games Machine reviewed RuneQuest Fantasy Roleplaying Game and stated that "this is an ideal purchase for any GM who is looking for a realistic, sophisticated and playable system of rules for a fantasy campaign."

In a 1996 reader poll conducted by the British game magazine Arcane to determine the 50 most popular roleplaying games of all time, RuneQuest was ranked 5th. Editor Paul Pettengale commented: "RuneQuest manages to establish itself as a cut above the rest because of its intricate and highly original campaign setting. [...] This is a world that combines high-fantasy heroism with the gritty realities of cross-humanoid racism and the problems of day-to-day living. The cults of the world, which play an intrinsic part of every adventurer's life, add to the mysticism of the game, and give it a level of depth which other fantasy systems can be but envious of." Three issues later, Dan Joyce reviewed the original game and pointed out "RuneQuest broke the FRP mould. You weren't stuck with character classes. You didn't find it harder to hit a slow moving guy in plate armour than an Errol Flynn in a silk shirt. And you weren't expected to head straight for the gold left piled in that bizarre dungeon, a few miles west of Anyhowtown in Tolkiensville. It was everything that the 'first generation' games had failed to be."

RuneQuest was chosen for inclusion in the 2007 book Hobby Games: The 100 Best. Game designer Jennell Jaquays commented, "After RuneQuest and Glorantha, detailed fantasy worlds would become the norm, not the exception. Dragon Pass paved the way for TSR's Faerûn, better known as the Forgotten Realms, and Krynn, setting for the Dragonlance saga. But few would ever achieve the elegant but approachable rules complexity of the original RuneQuest or instill a fervent loyalty in fans that would span decades."

In a review of the 6th edition of RuneQuest in Black Gate, John ONeill said "The interior art is terrific throughout, and the writing is crisp and clear. Like all the best role playing books, RuneQuest Sixth Edition is fascinating to flip through even if you're not a fantasy gamer."

In his 2023 book Monsters, Aliens, and Holes in the Ground, RPG historian Stu Horvath noted that unlike other major RPGs of the time, characters did not gain more hit points as they progressed, fueling a need to avoid often deadly combat. "Players uninterested in losing limbs learn to solve problems without swinging swords. In turn, this desire to find non-violent solutions places increasing importance on the details of the setting, so as to give players the material they need to overcome adversity through conversation or clever scheming."

== Legacy ==
Chaosium reused the rules system developed in RuneQuest to form the basis of several other games. In 1980 the core of the RuneQuest system was published in a simplified form edited by Greg Stafford and Lynn Willis as Basic Role-Playing (BRP). BRP is a generic role-playing game system, derived from the two first RuneQuest editions. It was used for many Chaosium role-playing games that followed RuneQuest, including:

- Stormbringer (1981)
- Call of Cthulhu (1981)
- Worlds of Wonder (1982)
- Superworld (1983)
- ElfQuest (1984)
- Ringworld (1984)
- Pendragon (1985)
- Hawkmoon (1985)
- Nephilim (1992)

The science-fiction roleplaying game Other Suns, published by Fantasy Games Unlimited in 1983, used the Basic Role-Playing system as well.

Minor modifications of the BRP rules were introduced in every one of those games, to suit the flavor of each game's universe. Pendragon used a 1-20 scale and 1d20 roll instead of a percentile scale and 1d100.

In 2004, Chaosium released a print-on-demand version of the third edition RuneQuest rules with the trademarks removed under the titles Basic Roleplaying Players Book, Basic Roleplaying Magic Book, and Basic Roleplaying Creatures Book. That same year, Chaosium began preparing a new edition of Basic Roleplaying, which was released in 2008 as a single, comprehensive 400 page book, incorporating material from many of their previous BRP system games. The book offers many optional rules, as well as genre-specific advice for fantasy, horror, and science-fiction, but contains no setting-specific material.
