= RuneQuest Companion =

Tabletop fantasy role-playing game supplement

History, Stories and Play-aids
- Cover by Rick Becker, 1983, 2019
- Designers: Bill Johnson; Sherman Kahn; Alan LaVergne; Jim McCormick; Ron Nance; Sandy Petersen; Greg Stafford
- Publishers: Chaosium
- Publication: 1983; 42 years ago
- Genres: Fantasy
- Systems: Basic Role-Playing
- ISBN: 978-1-56882-520-5

RuneQuest Companion is a tabletop role-playing game supplement for RuneQuest. Originally published by Chaosium in 1983, it consisted of reprints of Wyrm's Footnotes magazine articles as well as new material to expand the game rules and setting. It received positive reviews in game periodicals including Dragon, White Dwarf, Fantasy Gamer, and Different Worlds. It was republished in 2019 in PDF format as part of Chaosium's RuneQuest: Classic Edition Kickstarter.

== Contents ==
RuneQuest Companion is a supplement consisting of

- reprints of magazine articles
- an errata sheet with corrections and additions to the second edition of RuneQuest
- new material that had been left out of Trollpak
- a new history and geography of the Holy Country by Greg Stafford
- a solo adventure scenario designed by Alan LaVergne
- a short story, "The Smell of a Rat", also by Lavergne
- details of illusion Rune magic by Stafford
- details of unicorns and trolls by Sandy Petersen
- fragments of fictional correspondence
- excerpts from chronicles of notable and historical figures of Glorantha
- and more.

== Publication history ==
In 1976, the year after Chaosium released their first product, the fantasy board game White Bear and Red Moon, the company published Wyrm's Footnotes, a magazine dedicated to providing supplemental material about the game. When Chaosium released its fantasy role-playing game Runequest in 1978, set in Glorantha, articles about the fictional world began to appear in Wyrm's Footnotes. By 1981, Wyrm's Footnotes was solely dedicated to articles about Glorantha. However, the magazine was discontinued in 1982, and as Ken Rolston noted, "When publication of Wyrm's Footnotes ended, a most important source of detail, both epic and trivial, about Glorantha disappeared."

In 1983, RuneQuest Companion was released as a 72-page book edited by Charlie Krank that contained a collection of previously published Wyrm's Footnotes articles as well as new material.

As several contemporary reviewers noted, RuneQuest Companion was initially publicized as the first in a projected series of Companion books. However, no other volumes were ever published.

== Reception ==
In the July 1983 edition of Dragon (Issue #75), Ken Rolston noted the need for supplementary information about Glorantha, given the demise of Wyrm's Footnotes. Rolston liked the production values of the Companion, pointing out it was "edited and maintained according to Chaosium's usual high standards." Rolston concluded with a strong recommendation for RuneQuest players.

In the October 1983 edition of White Dwarf (Issue #46), Oliver Dickinson thought that the material included was "entertaining stuff, but not as interesting or useful to newer players as reprints of the [Wyrm's Footnotes] articles on the elemental pantheons would have been, for instance, or the thought-provoking articles on aspects of the rules by various authors in the last four issues." Dickinson concluded by giving this supplement an above average rating of 8 out of 10, saying it contained "a high proportion of useful or entertaining material and little that is totally peripheral. Production quality is good overall, with a few errors or misprints."

David Dunham reviewed RuneQuest Companion for Fantasy Gamer magazine and stated that "The RuneQuest Companion is not a bad product, but neither is it an especially good one. If you play RQ, you might want to get a copy, especially if you play in Glorantha or haven't seen the older issues of Wyrm's Footnotes."

Mike Dawson reviewed RuneQuest Companion for Different Worlds magazine and stated that "The potential purchaser of the Companion should take a long hard look at the material presented in the Companion before considering buying it. If your campaign needs information on the Holy Country, unicorns, illusions, or any of the other material presented there, then it may be worth the price. But if the information presented there is of only marginal use to you, then the Companion will be at best only a marginal use of your money."
