= Michael O'Brien (game designer) =

Australian role-playing game designer

- Occupation: Game designer
- Employer: Chaosium

Michael O'Brien is a game designer who has worked primarily on role-playing games.

== Career ==
Michael O'Brien, along with David Hall, Nick Brooke, Rick Meints and others were part of the staff on the leading Glorantha fanzine Tales of the Reaching Moon (1989-2002).

When new RuneQuest line editor Ken Rolston began the so-called "RuneQuest Renaissance" for Avalon Hill, his first publication was Sun County (1992) by O'Brien. O'Brien contributed to later RuneQuest releases in the product line during Rolston's tenure at Avalon Hill.

O'Brien published two issues the Glorantha Con Down Under fundraiser fanzine Questlines (1995-1998). These were published in 1995 and 1998 as fund-raisers for gaming conventions held in Melbourne, Australia. O'Brien also created Gorp #1 (Summer, 2000) a mock fanzine that was allegedly a rare collectible item published in 1982. This magazine was produced for a British gaming convention in 2000, and because it nevertheless featured original material by Ken Rolston, Greg Stafford, David Hall and O'Brien, Gorp is considered valuable and collectable in its own right.

In 2015 O'Brien became a co-owner of Moon Design Publications, along with Rick Meints, Jeff Richard and Neil Robinson. Later that year as part of an announcement by Greg Stafford that Moon Design Publications had joined the ownership group of his iconic game company Chaosium, O'Brien became vice president of Chaosium.
