= Wyrm's Footnotes =

Games magazine 1976-1982

'Wyrm's Footnotes'
- Editor: Greg Stafford
- First issue: 1976; 49 years ago
- Final issue: 1982; 43 years ago
- Company: Chaosium
- Country: US

Contents page of Issue #1 (1976)

Wyrm's Footnotes is a gaming magazine first published in 1976 by Chaosium that ran for 14 issues, and ceased publication in 1982.

== History ==
Wyrm's Footnotes was originally a house organ for Chaosium that featured articles about Chaosium's first publication, White Bear and Red Moon. Issue 1, edited by Greg Stafford, was a mimeographed and stapled fanzine that featured variant rules for White Bear and Red Moon, and histories of the Glorantha setting.

Starting in Issue #3, advertising appeared for other Chaosium products such as the board games Elric, Lords of the Middle Sea, and Troy. Issue 4 was a more professional-looking digest-sized saddle-stitched magazine. Issue 5 was a full-sized magazine that featured an article about Chaosium's new fantasy role-playing game Runequest. Starting with Issue 8, Charlie Krank became the editor. Issue 11 (Spring 1981) featured a full-color cover.

After Chaosium began to publish their second magazine, Different Worlds, in 1979, Runequest became the sole focus of Wyrm's Footnotes.

By 1982, Chaosium found it was too expensive to publish two magazines, and dropped Wyrm's Footnotes after Issue 14 in favor of Different Worlds.

After the demise of Wyrm's Footnotes, articles from the magazine were gathered up and anthologized, first in RuneQuest Companion, and then in Wyrms Footprints, the latter published by Moon Design Publications.

Thirty years after the cancellation of the original magazine, Moon Design Publications published Wyrms Footnotes #15 (Summer 2012) with new Glorantha material by Greg Stafford and other writers.

== Reception ==
In Issue 25 of the British wargaming magazine Perfidious Albion, Charles Vasey reviewed Issue 3, and noted that it was "a 44-page 'zine using fancy electro-stencils. The standard and number of illustrations is worthy of note." After reviewing the large number of articles, Vasey concluded, "Well worth purchasing for the owner of [Chaosium's] games — which should be everyone."

In Issue 43 of The Space Gamer, W.G. Armintrout commented that "I found the magazine to be required reading for the Glorantha-oriented RQ gamemaster, but only optional for the non-Glorantha GM."

In Issue 8 of Abyss, Bill Hedges thought the eighth issue of Wyrm's Footnotes was "an increasingly professional looking magazine", but warned "There is some fair cartoon art, but this magazine is not for consumption by those who are not deeply into Runequest and Glorantha."

== Reviews ==
- Perfidious Albion #29 (July 1978) p.11
- Perfidious Albion #35 (January 1979) p.17
- Perfidious Albion #44 (January 1980) p.8
- Perfidious Albion #49 (December 1980) p.19
