= Tentacles Convention =

The Tentacles Convention was an international role-playing game convention held annually at Stahleck Castle in Germany on Pentecost. Tentacles was dedicated to games set in Glorantha such as HeroQuest and RuneQuest, as well as Call of Cthulhu, Stormbringer and Hawkmoon.

Tentacles Convention was hosted by the RuneQuest Gesellschaft e.V. (better known outside of Germany as The Chaos Society) every year from 1996 to 2009. During that time, Tentacles, and Convulsiion followed by Continuum were the only periodically held Glorantha conventions in Europe. Most of the about 180 guests were fans and authors of the supported game systems. The publishers Chaosium, Issaries, Inc. and MoonDesign used Tentacles as a forum for presenting and discussing the plans of their games.

Due to the international audience English was the main language. Tentacles offered the only opportunity in Germany to get in touch with two founders of role-playing Greg Stafford and Sandy Petersen. Sandy Petersen and other invited authors regularly wrote game modules and articles especially for Tentacles Convention. These works were published in the Ye Booke of Tentacles (YboT)-almanacs which are treasured by Glorantha and English-speaking Cthulhu fans.

A notable type of games at Tentacles was the freeform role-playing game.

== Literature ==
- Fabian Küchler et al.: Tentacles Festschrift. In: Ye Booke of Tentacles Nr. 6, RuneQuest-Gesellschaft e.V., Bremen June 2006, p. 5-17
