= King of Sartar =

- Author: Greg Stafford
- Genre: Fantasy
- Publisher: Chaosium
- Publication place: US
- English publication date: 1992

King of Sartar is a 1992 novel published by Chaosium.

== Plot summary ==
King of Sartar is a novel in which manuscripts regarding Dragon Pass and its hero Argrath are compiled.

== Publication history ==
Shannon Appelcline noted that "With the downturn behind them, in late 1992 Chaosium struck out in an entirely new area of publication: fiction. King of Sartar (1992) was Chaosium's return to Glorantha and also the first Chaosium work of fiction. This collection of 'in-world' source material was very well received by fans but it was clearly an entirely niche product." Appelcline noted that King of Sartar "was generally given accolades for its deep and realistic look at the fantasy world of Glorantha. Appelcline also noted that "In the years surrounding the Mythos releases Greg Stafford had found a new interested in Glorantha, separate from RuneQuest. After the successful release of King of Sartar he had begun publishing 'unfinished works' about Glorantha and had also commissioned a new roleplaying game from Robin Laws. With this newest Chaosium downturn, Greg decided in 1998 to part ways from the company he had founded, taking all Gloranthan rights with him. He would later use them to form Issaries, Inc."

== Reception ==
Phillip Hessel reviewed King of Sartar in White Wolf #45 (July 1994), rating it a 2.5 out of 5 and stated that "This depends on one's interest in Glorantha. If you're the sort of devotee who hunts down rare issues of The Wyrms Footnotes, at least look at this book. Those who are less avid probably won't find it worth the price."

== Reviews ==
- Tales of the Reaching Moon #9 (Winter, 1993)
- The Last Province (Issue 3 - 1993)
- Roleplayer Independent (Volume 1, Issue 6 - May 1993)
