= Cults of Terror =

1981 Tabletop role-playing game supplement for RuneQuest

Nine Dangerous Deities for RuneQuest Role-Playing
- Cover by Jennell Jaquays (Note: Credited as Paul Jaquays.)
- Designers: Greg Stafford; Ken Kaufer; Anders Swenson; Charlie Krank; John Natzke; Sandy Petersen; Sean Summers; Jennell Jaquays; Rudy Kraft; John Natzke; Lynn Willis
- Publishers: Chaosium; Moon Design Publications
- Publication: 1981 edition (Chaosium); 2002 Glorantha Classics Volume 3, Cult Compendium (Moon Design); 2016 Classic edition (Chaosium)
- Genres: Fantasy
- Systems: RuneQuest
- ISBN: 978-1568825151

Cults of Terror is a tabletop role-playing game supplement for RuneQuest, originally published by Chaosium in 1981. The sourcebook details nine evil deities and the cults that worship them, for use in Greg Stafford's fantasy world of Glorantha.

== Publication history ==
Originally published as a softback book by Chaosium in 1981. It was republished in 2002 by Moon Design Publications in a single volume with Cults of Prax as Glorantha Classics Volume 3, Cult Compendium, as a hardback with a dustcover and softback, it was republished as a PDF in 2010. The 1981 edition was republished in 2016 in PDF format as part of Chaosium's RuneQuest: Classic Edition Kickstarter.

Shannon Appelcline explained that "Though some of RuneQuest's first supplements were simple dungeon crawls and stat books, many others were groundbreaking. Cults of Prax (1979) and Cults of Terror (1981) gave precise details on the worship of a few dozen gods within the world of Glorantha, further delving into the depths of RuneQuest's sophisticated religions."

== Contents ==
- Introduction - How Gloranthan cults work, maps, a pronunciation guide and The Reminiscences of Paulis Longvale, an in-world document detailing a region called Dorastor.
- History And Cosmology By Greg Stafford. An 11 page Gloranthan guide.
- Primal Chaos By Ken Kaufer
- Mallia By Anders Swenson
- Bagog By Charlie Krank And John Natzke
- Thed By Sandy Petersen
- Vivamort By Sean Summers
- Thanatar By Jennell Jaquays
- The Crimson Bat By Rudy Kraft
- Krarsht By John Natzke, Lynn Willis, and Charlie Krank
- Nysalor/Gbaji By Greg Stafford

== Reception ==
Ron Pehr reviewed Cults of Terror in The Space Gamer No. 42. Pehr commented that "if you play RuneQuest, or even if you just want to see what an excellent game aid can be, you'll buy Cults of Terror."

Patrick Amory reviewed Cults of Terror for Different Worlds magazine and stated that "I advise you that you do not waste money on Cults of Terror: it is not being used at half its potential if only for NPCs. However, if you plan to use it like any cult book, I give it my heartiest recommendation. Cults of Terror is one of the most thought-provoking, well-written and imaginatively-designed sourcebooks on the market."

Oliver Dickinson reviewed Cults of Terror for White Dwarf #34, giving it an overall rating of 6 out of 10, and stated that "For GMs who set their campaigns in Glorantha and use the RuneQuest religious structures and cosmology, and for all those who wish to know more of this fascinating world, this book is essential reading."
