= Bad Medicine for Dr. Drugs =

Role-playing game supplement

Cover art by Butch Guise, 1984

Bad Medicine for Dr. Drugs is an adventure published by Chaosium in 1984 for the superhero role-playing game Superworld, using the Basic Role-Playing rules system.

== Description ==
The player characters, high school students who have recently discovered their superpowers, are shocked when one of their classmates dies of a drug overdose. They decide to investigate the drug distribution ring operating in their high school. The adventure is divided into four chapters, each one bringing the superheroes closer to the supervillain Dr. Drugs.

Six pregenerated characters are provided, as well as rules for generating teenaged superheroes who have just discovered their powers. Under a license agreement with Hero Games, the adventure can be converted to the Champions role-playing game rules.

== Publication history ==
Superworld originally appeared in 1983 as part of the cross-genre Worlds of Wonder game to demonstrate the flexibility of the Basic Role-Playing rules. Chaosium then published Superworld as a stand-alone product the following year. Bad Medicine for Dr. Drugs, the first adventure for the system, was released in 1984, a 52-page softcover book written by Ken Rolston, with interior art by Michael Blum and Bob Sharen, and cover art by Butch Guice.

== Reception ==
William A. Barton reviewed this adventure in The Space Gamer No. 72, and commented that "Overall, within its concept, Bad Medicine for Dr. Drugs is an excellent adventure for Superworld (or Champions), though those of us long out of high school may have to work a bit harder to bring it off. With that qualification, I recommend it."

In the November–December 1984 edition of Different Worlds (Issue 37), Russell Grant Collins liked the more local nature of the adventure, pointing out that for the players "There's no earth-shaking menace that they have to defeat. If they fail today, they'll get to try again tomorrow." He also commended the investigative aspect, unusual for combat-oriented superhero games. He concluded by giving it an average rating of 2 out of 4, saying, "I would recommend this scenario to people who play Superworld or Champions, especially those in high school. It's quite a good change of pace from the usual superhero slugfest."

In his 1990 book The Complete Guide to Role-Playing Games, game critic Rick Swan called this "a goofy, engaging adventure."

== Reviews ==
- Comics Feature #30
