= Rick Meints =

American game designer

- Occupation: Game designer

Rick Meints is a game designer who has worked primarily on role-playing games.

== Career ==
Rick Meints was an American expatriate in the 1990s who joined the British fan publisher Reaching Moon Megacorp, which was "the center of Glorantha culture at the time" according to Shannon Appelcline. Meints was one of the staff on the leading Glorantha fanzine Tales of the Reaching Moon (1989-2002), published by Reaching Moon Megacorp. Meints wrote a book about collecting publications related to Glorantha, The Meints Index to Glorantha (1996, 1999), which was published by the Reaching Moon Megacorp. Meints and Colin Phillips founded Moon Design Publications in 1998, which published HeroQuest.

In July 2015, as part of an announcement by Greg Stafford that Moon Design Publications had joined the ownership group of his iconic game company Chaosium, Meints formally became president of Chaosium with Stafford becoming chair of the board of directors.
