= Troy (game) =

Board game

Rulebook cover art by Donald Dupont. Achilles Killing Penthesileia after an Attic Black Vase Painting by Exekias, c. 540 B.C.

Troy is a board wargame published by Chaosium in 1977 that simulates various sieges of Troy through the ages.

== Background ==
Troy was founded around 3600 BCE. Over the next 4000 years, Troy was repeatedly attacked, destroyed and rebuilt, leaving a tell with at least nine archaeological layers. One of these was supposedly the Greek siege described in Homer's Iliad, although the exact relationship between myth and reality remains unclear and there is no definitive evidence for a Greek attack on the city.

== Description ==
Troy is a 2-player board wargame in which one player defends the city of Troy, and the other player controls the forces besieging the city.

=== Components ===
A 35" x 23" hex grid map displays the plain at the foot of the hill bearing the city of Troy, using a scale of 300 metres (330 yd) per hex. The game also includes a rulebook, a cardstock sheet of cut-apart cards, and a sheet of die-cut counters, that represent fighting units in light, medium and heavy variations, including chariots, cavalry and ships. Forty-three counters represent various heroes, and other counters represent the heroes' "divine gifts". One counter represents Helen of Troy.

=== Gameplay ===
The game system uses a basic "I Go, You Go" system of alternating turns, where one player moves and attacks, followed by the second player. Each turn represents six hours, with four-day campaigns. Only light units chariots and cavalry have a zone of control.

A series of five scenarios gradually introduce new rules to add complexity to the game, and are keyed to various archaeological layers at Troy, representing various historical sieges:

- Troy I c.2600 BCE: Basic rules
- Troy II, c.2300 BCE: Rules for medium infantry, voluntary retreats, supplies and looting.
- Troy III–V, c. 1900 BCE: Rules for chariots, cavalry and individual heroes.
- Troy VI, c. 1300 BCE: Rules for heavy infantry, personal combat between heroes
- Troy VIIa, non-historical scenario that recreates the Trojan War. Rules for supplies, special counters representing weapons of the gods. In the case of a draw, the game can be decided by the Trojan Horse optional rule.

== Publication history ==
Chaosium was founded in 1975, and in their first year, published the fantasy board game, White Bear and Red Moon. No new products appeared in 1976, but in 1977, they rolled out three more board wargames: Elric; Nomad Gods; and Troy. The latter was designed and illustrated by Donald Dupont and was published in 1977 as a ziplock bag game. The game was rapidly overshadowed by its contemporary rival, the professionally bexed Iliad: The Siege of Troy (Conflict Games, 1978).

== Reception ==
In Issue 21 of the British wargaming magazine Perfidious Albion, Charles Vasey and Geoffrey Barnard discussed the game. Vasey commented that although the designer, Donald Dupont, had managed successfully to add the effects of Greek gods to the game, in general "[Dupont] cannot design wargames for toffee." Vasey excoriated the Combat Results Table then continued, "even the siege rules fail to rise above the rest — they are so silly that one cannot believe anyone fought for ten years over what appears to be a small hillock." Barnard replied, "I soon decided there was something wrong with the system ... Remove the hero rules and this game is lacking anything special at all." Vasey concluded that the game was "A great disappointment." Barnard concluded, "If all you want is an amusing game to while away a few spare hours, then Troy might be worth getting, the counters are still fairly pretty. If you want a game that you can take at all seriously, then you had better look elsewhere!"

In the 1980 book The Complete Book of Wargames, game designer Jon Freeman noted that this game was outshone by its rival, Iliad, and put that down to ugly graphics: "Troy's map ... and counters are unattractively rendered in bizarre and unappealing pastel shades that makes the game painful to contemplate." Freeman also believed the game rules were too simple for experienced wargames. Freeman concluded by giving the game an Overall Evaluation of "Fair", saying, "Troy illustrates the difference between input and output: what came out was not worthy of the information and affection that went into it."

In The Guide to Simulations/Games for Education and Training, Martin Campion noted that "The game is lovingly crafted and is one of the most attractive around." Campion concluded with thoughts about the final non-historical scenario based on the Iliad, saying, "Although it is not strictly historical, it is certainly based on a historically important document and reflects what was probably a real event."
