= Wyrms Footprints =

Fantasy tabletop role-playing game supplement

Glorantha Legends and Lore
- Cover by Dan Barker.
- Designers: Greg Stafford
- Publishers: Chaosium and Reaching Moon Megacorp
- Publication: 1995; 30 years ago
- Genres: fantasy
- Systems: Systemless

Wyrms Footprints, Glorantha Legends and Lore, is a 1995 book, written by Greg Stafford, with a cover by Dan Barker, and published by Chaosium and Reaching Moon Megacorp. It expands Stafford's fantasy world of Glorantha.

== Contents ==
Wyrms Footprints is a supplement which reprints articles that previously appeared in the bi-monthly Wyrm's Footnotes magazine, compiled for the first time.

== Reception ==
Paul Pettengale reviewed Wyrms Footprints for Arcane magazine, rating it an 8 out of 10 overall. Pettengale comments that "This collection [...] helps any GM embellish his or her Gloranthan setting. While the staggering variety of content may give the impression that chaos rather than order has predominated in the compilation of the supplement, this doesn't detract from the book's utility."
