= Through Dungeons Deep =

- Cover art by Signe Landon
- Author: Robert Plamondon
- Genre: Gaming
- Publisher: Reston Publishing
- Publication date: 1982
- ISBN: 978-0835976879

Through Dungeons Deep, subtitled "A Fantasy Gamers' Handbook", is a book written by Robert Plamondon and originally published by Reston Publishing in 1982, providing an overview of the then-new world of fantasy role-playing games.

== Contents ==
Through Dungeons Deep provides a detailed introduction to fantasy role-playing game. Part I is for players: Chapter 1 explains role-playing games. Chapters 2–4 concentrate on creating a player character. Chapters 5 and 6 explain how to build a home base and the adventurer's main occupation — exploring dungeons. Chapter 7 covers monsters and combat, while Chapters 8–10 discuss treasure, magic and wealth.

Parts II and III are for new gamemasters (GMs), covering becoming a GM; design philosophy; creating a campaign; how one should referee; how to create and run non-player characters and monsters; traps, treasure and magic; world design; scenarios; altering the rules; keeping up with the players; and designing a pantheon of deities.

Appendices provide reviews of the various games available on the market at the time, reviews of RPG magazines, and the use of miniatures.

== Publication history ==
By the late 1970s, the first fantasy role-playing game Dungeons & Dragons had become very popular, and many other competitors appeared — Tunnels & Trolls, Runequest, White Bear and Red Moon, and many others. Robert Plamondon, a longtime contributor to Alarums & Excursions and Dragon, wrote Through Dungeons Deep to try to provide some context about this new type of game. The 324-page hardcover book was published by Reston Publishing in 1982 with cover and interior illustrations by Signe Landon..

After Reston went out of business, the book was reprinted by Robert Plamondon in 2009 under his Norton Creek Press imprint.

== Reception ==
In Issue 35 of Different Worlds, John Sapienza commented, "Through Dungeons Deep is an excellent book [...] I wonder why it was printed only as an expensive hardcover that costs more than many games. This can only limit its availability to the gamer, which is the market it deserves to reach, not the library or school market. I hope that Reston will arrange with the author to do an updated edition, and publish it as a paperback for mass distribution. But even at its current price, I recommend Deep to anyone looking for ideas to improve your campaign."

In Issue 21 of Abyss, Dave Nalle noted "Every aspect of play is given some attention, often quite intelligently, with good suggestions and ideas." Nalle did point out that the book concentrates on D&D, and thus does not cover the skill systems increasingly being used by competing game systems. Nalle concluded, "This is a good book for new players, because it encourages them without binding them to one system... In short this is a must for gaming clubs and large campaigns to inform new players."

In Issue 79 of The Space Gamer, Anne Jaffe compared this book to two others and noted, "Plamondon, as might be expected, has the best grasp of playing; he manages for the most part to keep players' jargon out of it." However, Jaffe thought that three essential points were missing, namely "1. the literary nature of the game, 2. the variegated nature of the gaming community , or 3. the difference between the game and a game system."

In 2020, RPG historian Shannon Appelcline noted that this book covers the turbulent times in the world of role-playing as the games changed from the "make it up on the fly" philosophy of early role-playing to the tighter rules-based philosophy of Advanced Dungeons & Dragons. Appelcline wrote, "Plamondon, like many early players, was clearly chafing at the new rules, saying that you 'don’t really need rules at all'; later, when talking about Gary Gygax's statement that players shouldn't change a game's rules, Plamondon even more bluntly says: 'I think this is hogwash.'" Appelcline pointed out that "The players section... falls on the old-school side of the chronological divide, and that makes it the most intriguing section in the whole book (and the one most intriguing to modern historians). That's because it's practically an Old School Revival Handbook, suggesting how D&D (and other RPGs) were played at the dawn of the hobby: something the OSR movement has been working to recreate." Appelcline concluded, "Through Dungeons Deep doesn't give any specific insights to the history of companies within the roleplaying world ... but it does provide insight into a period of roleplaying play, the exact period that the OSR is now working to replicate, and as such it's both an intriguing history book and a great HOW-TO book for OSR play."
