= Trouble for HAVOC =

Superhero tabletop role-playing game supplement

- Cover art by Chris Marrinam.
- Designers: Yurek Chodak; Donald Harrington; Charles Huber; Steve Perrin
- Publishers: Chaosium
- Publication: 1984; 2010 PDF
- Genres: Superhero
- Systems: Basic Role-Playing; Champions; Villains and Vigilantes

Trouble for HAVOC is a supplement for the superhero role-playing game Superworld that includes three adventures.

== Description ==
Trouble for HAVOC includes three scenarios that focus on a criminal organization called HAVOC:

- "Crisis at Calliente": The heroes must prevent the theft of a nuclear reactor by members of HAVOC.
- "Return of the Elokians": The heroes must venture underground to confront a supervillain and his minions after HAVOC threatens humanity with an earthquake weapon.
- "Fourth for Bridge?": The heroes race against a team from HAVOC to be the first to reach a downed spaceship in Antarctica. It is possible to play any team, or even play two or three teams in parallel if there are enough players. Pre-generated characters are proposed for each team but the players are free to substitute their usual characters.

Statistics in all the adventures are given for Superworld as well as the other superhero games Champions and Villains & Vigilantes.

== Publication history ==
Chaosium published the superhero role-playing game Superworld in 1982. The supplement Trouble for HAVOC was written by Yurek Chodak, Donald Harrington, Charles Huber, and Steve Perrin, with art by Chris Marrinam, and was published by Chaosium in 1984. It was republished in PDF format in 2010.

== Reception ==
In Issue 71 of The Space Gamer (November–December 1984), Allen Varney commented "If you want a lot of genuinely interesting superheroes and villains for your campaign, Trouble for Havoc is certainly worth examining. If you hunger for subterranean action, you could do worse than the second scenario here. But mostly the adventures are file-and-forget."

Russell Grant Collins reviewed Trouble for HAVOC for Different Worlds magazine and stated that "I'd recommend this module to anyone playing any of these systems and looking for a few good adventures. In fact, it's worth translating into other systems if you've the inclination for that sort of thing."

== Reviews ==
- Comics Feature #32
- Comics Feature #36
