= Issaries =

Issaries can refer to:

- Issaries, Inc., a role-playing game publishing house
- Issaries, the fictional Lightbringer god of trade in the Glorantha setting of the role-playing game RuneQuest
