= Worlds of Wonder (game) =

1982 Multi-genre tabletop role-playing game

- Cover art by Jody A. Lee
- Designers: Steve Perrin; Steve Henderson; Gordon Monson; Greg Stafford; Lynn Willis
- Publishers: Chaosium
- Publication: 1982; 43 years ago
- Genres: Multi-genre
- Systems: Basic Role-Playing

Worlds of Wonder is a multi-genre set of three role-playing games (RPGs) produced by Chaosium in 1982 that all used the Basic Role-Playing set of rules.

== Description ==
Chaosium, like other early RPG publishers, created several games in different genres, each with its own set of rules for character generation, combat, etc. Characters from one game could not be exported to another game without a complete overhaul of abilities, skills, weapons and equipment. In 1980, in an effort to create a standardized rule system, Chaosium published a generic game system called Basic Role-Playing (BRP).

In 1982, Chaosium published Worlds of Wonder, a collection of three RPGs that all used BRP as their rules system. It was the industry's first multi-RPG product that would work with the same set of rules. Characters from one RPG could be shifted to the other RPGs with minimal adjustments.

=== Components ===
The game came as a boxed set that contained:

- a 16-page booklet Basic Role-Playing
- a 16-page booklet Magic World
- a 16-page booklet Superworld
- a 16-page booklet Future World
- a 4-page leaflet explaining how to join the games together, using a neutral crossroads called the "City of Wonder" that would allow characters to move between the three RPGs. Money from each setting could be converted to other worlds' currencies in the city.
- a 2-page map of the "City of Wonder"
- a 4-page leaflet with reference tables
- a cardboard sheet of figures to be cut out and used as figurines
- a 4-sided die, three 6-sided dice, an 8-sided die, and a 20-sided die

=== Basic Role-Playing ===
The Basic Role-Playing booklet was a summary of the game system devised by Greg Stafford and Lynn Willis in 1980.

=== Magic World ===
The Magic World booklet, written by Steve Perrin and Gordon Monson, is a fantasy RPG similar to Dungeons & Dragons and RuneQuest. It contains game rules specific to this world such as the use of magic. Initial characters can start as one of four professions (Warriors, Rogues, Sages and Sorcerers) and one of the standard Tolkienesque fantasy races, such as dwarfs, trolls, goblins, and elves.

In most other RPGs to that time, the spellcaster cast a spell and success required the target to fail a saving throw. In Magic World, casting a spell is a skill much like picking a lock or swinging a sword — the spellcaster achieves success with a good skill roll. (This system was later incorporated into the third edition of RuneQuest.)

The last three pages of the booklet contain a sample adventure.

Later in 2012, Chaosium would publish Magic World as a stand alone game.

=== Future World ===
The Future World booklet, also written by Perrin and Monson, with interior and cover art by Rick Becker, is a science fiction setting similar to Traveller by Game Designers Workshop. Like Traveller, the Chaosium setting employs a large interstellar empire. Characters can start as members of one of six professions (Army, Civilian, Criminal, ICE, Scouts, or Science), and can choose human, several types of aliens (ursinoids, insectoids, and saurians), or a robot as their race.

The booklet ends with a three-page adventure.

=== Superworld ===
The booklet for Superworld was written by Perrin and Steve Henderson, with interior and cover art by Roland Brown. The setting is the modern world, where, similar to the superhero RPGs Villains & Vigilantes and Champions, the player characters have superpowers. During character generation, these powers are bought with Hero Points. Hero Points can also be spent to raise characteristics like strength or dexterity. Additional Hero Points can be gained by taking disabilities like blindness or vulnerability to certain attacks.

The booklet ends with a three-page adventure.

Superworld was the only RPG of the three included with this game to be published as a stand-alone game. However, up against several other well-established competitors, it never gained an audience, and publication was discontinued after only three supplements.

== Reception ==
William A. Barton reviewed Worlds of Wonder in The Space Gamer No. 51. Barton commented that "Overall, though its component parts may not be earth-shattering or overly innovative, Worlds of Wonder is still a pretty good buy."

Trevor Graver reviewed Worlds of Wonder for White Dwarf #34, giving it an overall rating of 7 out of 10, and stated that "In summary, Worlds of Wonder is a good buy if your are into swords and sorcery, crimefighting, and space opera (not the game) without starships. Even then, you may feel that Chaosium have only provided the 'bones' of each system, leaving you to wait for the release of more material."

In the August 1982 edition of Different Worlds (Issue #22), C.D. Martin called the games "entry-level", only suitable for beginners due the simplicity of their rules. Of the three included RPGs, Martin thought Superworld was the strongest, commenting, "This one has the greatest staying power." He concluded, "Worlds of Wonder is a superior product. If Chaosium backs it up with prepackaged scenarios, it will be with us for a long time. I highly recommend it."

In the August 1982 edition of Dragon (Issue 64), John Sapienza, more than his contemporaries, realized the implications of developing a cross-genre rules system, commenting, "I believe that WOW represents an attempt to develop a set of basic operating rules that can be applied to any gaming world. I think that Chaosium carried this out with considerable success, although I think there is room for improvement in applying the same rule in parallel situations." Sapienza concluded with a strong recommendation, saying, "I consider this an advancement of the state of the art in game design, and the beginning of a new generation of games, and well worth the attempt. Worlds of Wonder more than a set of minigames, it’s a major game system, and well worth exploring for both the novice and the experienced rolegamer."

In his 1990 book The Complete Guide to Role-Playing Games, game critic Rick Swan called this "not only the one of the best introductory RPGs ever published, but it also introduces concepts pertinent to three distinct genres." Swan felt that Super World was the best of the three genres, calling it "an entertaining and exciting introduction to comic-book-hero role-playing." Swan concluded by giving Worlds of Wonder a solid rating of 3 out of 4, saying, ""There are better introductory games available in every genre covered here ... but as a user friendly overview, Worlds of Wonder is an excellent package."

== Other recognition ==
A copy of Worlds of Wonder is held in the collection of the Strong National Museum of Play (object 110.211.5).
