= Fantasy wargame =

A fantasy wargame is a wargame that involves a fantastical setting and employs rules for elements such as magic and non-human intelligent creatures.

== History ==
The rise in popularity of wargaming from the 1950s to the 1970s largely coincided with the rise in popularity of J. R. R. Tolkien's The Lord of the Rings novel. By the 1960s, a new genre of game was gaining momentum as more players introduced rules for battle that featured characters such as wizards and dragons and role-playing organizations began to emerge across the United States.

In 1970, the New England Wargamers Association demonstrated a fantasy wargame called Middle Earth at a convention of the Military Figure Collectors Association. The fantasy supplement to Chainmail (1971) led to the development of the role-playing game Dungeons & Dragons, designed by Gary Gygax and Dave Arneson. Fantasy writer Greg Stafford created the board wargame White Bear and Red Moon to explore conflicts in his fantasy world Glorantha, though it did not see publication until 1974.

=== Warhammer ===
In 1983, Bryan Ansell, Richard Halliwell, and Rick Priestley created a fantasy wargame titled Warhammer. The game took place in a fantastical world full of elves, ogres, demons, orcs and dwarves, alongside armies of lizard men and rat-men known as Skaven. Players collected armies based on these races and battled using a ruleset that revolved around the results of die rolls. Warhammer soon became popular among wargamers, and in 1987 a new Warhammer game was released under the title Warhammer 40,000. It used some races from the original but took place in space.
