= Gene Day =

Canadian comic artist

- Born: Howard Eugene Day; 13 August 1951
- Died: 23 September 1982 (aged 31) Gananoque, Ontario, Canada
- Areas: Cartoonist, Writer, Penciller, Inker
- Notable works: Star Wars, Master of Kung Fu
- Awards: Joe Shuster Award, 2007; Inkwell Awards SASRA, 2022

Howard Eugene Day (August 13, 1951 – September 23, 1982) was a Canadian comics artist best known for his work on Marvel Comics' Star Wars licensed series and Master of Kung Fu. He was considered a mentor by independent comic writer/artist Dave Sim.

== Biography ==
=== Early career ===
Gene Day began his career with Canadian underground and independent comics, for which he published the short-lived title Out of the Depths in 1974, and collaborated with Dave Sim on Oktoberfest Comics #1 (Now and Then Publications, 1976). Day also penciled for Skywald Publications' horror comics magazines Psycho and Nightmare, starting in late 1974, as well as the science fiction-oriented Orb.

For Mike Friedrich's early independent-comics company Star Reach, Day variously wrote/drew stories in 1977 and 1978 for the namesake anthology title Star Reach and its sister magazines Imagine and Quack, the latter a talking animal comic. Other work includes "Cheating Time!", written by Mark Burbey, in Dr. Wirtham's Comix & Stories #4 (1979).

In 1977 he illustrated the Greg Stafford's fantasy wargame Nomad Gods. His continuing relationship with Stafford's company, Chaosium would see him produce artwork for many of their products, including the cover of the first edition of the horror roleplaying game Call of Cthulhu in 1981.

From 1975 until 1980, Gene Day published, under the imprint Shadow Press, at least 23 issues - the last being numbered #24/25, and there having been no #13 - of the fanzine/magazine Dark Fantasy: The Magazine Of Underground Creators for which he was also an art contributor.

=== Graphic novel and Marvel Comics ===
In 1979, Day wrote and drew an early graphic novel, Future Day (Flying Buttress Press), a hardcover collection of seven stories that he called a "graphic album". Dave Sim was the letterer. Day did illustrations for the fantasy role-playing games Arena of Khazan: A Tunnels & Trolls Solitaire Dungeon (1979), Space Opera Core Rules by Fantasy Games Unlimited (1980), and Call of Cthulhu (1981).

Day began his several-year association with Master of Kung Fu by inking penciler Mike Zeck starting with issue #76 (May 1979). He began doing finished art over Zeck's breakdowns starting with issue #94 (Nov. 1980), and became series penciler from #102–120 (July 1981–Jan. 1983), after having split the work with Zeck on the double-sized #100. In 2010, Comics Bulletin ranked Day's work on Master of Kung-Fu sixth on its list of the "Top 10 1970s Marvels". Day inked Carmine Infantino on Marvel's Star Wars series, occasionally doing finished art over breakdowns, and penciling #68–69 (Feb.–March 1983), which take place on Boba Fett's ancestral homeworld of Mandalore. In addition, Day inked Thor and Marvel Two-in-One featuring the Thing.

=== Death ===
Day died of a coronary crossing a street in his hometown of Gananoque, Ontario.

== Legacy ==
From 1985 to 1986, Renegade Press published five issues of Gene Day's Black Zeppelin, an anthology series primarily featuring stories and painted covers Day completed before his death, as well as new contributions by Dave Sim, Bruce Conklin, Augustine Funnell, and Charles Vess. It was edited by Gail Day and Joe Erslavas. More of his work appeared posthumously in Caliber Comics' anthology series Day Brothers Presents, which also featured the work of Day's comics-artist brothers, David Day and Dan Day.

In 2002, Sim and his Cerebus collaborator Gerhard created the Howard E. Day Prize, an annual award given to a comic creator chosen by them from the exhibitors at the Small Press and Alternative Comics Expo (SPACE) held in Columbus, Ohio. The Day Prize was awarded at SPACE through 2008. Sim explained,

Gene really showed me that success in a creative field is a matter of hard work and productivity and persistence. I had done a handful of strips and illustrations at that point mostly for various fanzines but I wasn't very productive. I would do a strip or an illustration and send it off to a potential market and then wait to find out if they were going to use it before doing anything else. Or I'd wait for someone to write to me and ask me to draw something. Gene was producing artwork every day and putting it out in the mail and when it came back he'd send it out to someone else. He would draw work for money and then do work on spec if the paying markets dried up. He kept trying at places where he had been rejected. He did strips, cartoons, caricatures, covers, spot illos, anything that he might get paid for. He gave drawing lessons and produced his own fanzines.

In 2007, Day was inducted into the Joe Shuster Awards' Canadian Comic Book Creator Hall of Fame. Two years later, with the consent of Day's brothers, the Joe Shuster Awards founded the Gene Day Award for Canadian Self-Publishing, which honors Canadian comic book creators who self-published their work during the previous calendar year. The first Day Award was presented on September 26, 2009 by David Day and James Waley to Jesse Jacobs for his self-published mini-comic Blue Winter, Shapes in the Snow. In 2022, Gene Day was a posthumous recipient of the Inkwell Awards' Stacey Aragon Special Recognition Award (SASRA).

== Future Day ==
Day's work in his 1979, graphic novel-like story collection:

- "Gifts of Silver Splendor" (6 p.)
- "Hive" (6 p.)
- "Days of Future Past" (6 p.)
- "Gauntlet" (6 p.)
- "Paper Dragon" (5 p.)
- "War Games" (10 p.)
- "Black Legion" (text story, 7 p.)

== Bibliography ==
=== Aardvark-Vanaheim ===
- Swords of Cerebus #3 (1981)

=== DC Comics ===
- Tales of the New Teen Titans #3 (inks over George Perez) (1982)

=== Marvel Comics ===
- The Amazing Spider-Man #206 (inks over John Byrne) (1980)
- The Avengers #181 (inks over John Byrne); #201 (inks over George Perez) (1979–1980)
- Bizarre Adventures #30 (1982)
- Black Panther #13–15 (inks over Jerry Bingham) (1979)
- Epic Illustrated #32 (writer) (1985)
- Further Adventures of Indiana Jones #3 (1983)
- Marvel Premiere #51–52 (Black Panther) (inks over Jerry Bingham); #54 (Caleb Hammer) (1979–1980)
- Marvel Spotlight vol. 2 #3 (Captain Marvel) (inks over Pat Broderick) (1979)
- Marvel Team-Up #80 (inks over Mike Vosburg) (1979)
- Marvel Two-in-One #49 (inks over Alan Kupperberg); #56–58, 60, 64–65 (inks over George Perez); #61–63, 66 (inks over Jerry Bingham); #67–69, 71, Annual #6 (inks over Ron Wilson); #70 (inks over Michael Netzer) (1979–1981)
- Master of Kung Fu #102–111, 114–118, 120 (full art); #76–77, 79–101 (inks over Mike Zeck) (1979–1983)
- Savage Sword of Conan #68–69, 74, 102–104, 106 (1981–1984)
- Star Trek #14, 16 (inks over Luke McDonnell) (1981)
- Star Wars #68–69 (full art); #18, 21, 25, 28, 30, 33, 35–37, 45, 47 (inks over Carmine Infantino) (1978–1983)
- Thor #300, 310–315 (inks over Keith Pollard) (1980–1982)

=== Renegade Press ===
- Gene Day's Black Zeppelin #1–5 (1985–1986)

=== Star Reach ===
- Star Reach #6, 8–9, 11, 15 (1976–1978)

Preceded by Bruce D. Patterson	Master of Kung Fu inker 1979–1981	Succeeded by Armando Gil
Preceded by Joe Sinnott	Marvel Two-in-One inker 1979–1981	Succeeded by Chic Stone
Preceded by Mike Zeck	Master of Kung Fu penciller 1981–1983	Succeeded by David Mazzucchelli
