= Nomad Gods =

Fantasy tabletop wargame

- 1977 cover by Gene Day
- Designers: Greg Stafford
- Illustrators: Gene Day; William Church
- Publishers: Chaosium
- Publication: 1977; 48 years ago
- Genres: Fantasy board wargame

Nomad Gods is a fantasy wargame designed by Greg Stafford, and published by Chaosium in 1977. A French-language edition was published by Oriflam under license from Chaosium under the name Les Dieux Nomades in 1994. A free version for online play without the rulebook was released for the Vassal Engine in 2012. Chaosium republished the rulebook in PDF format in 2017.

== History ==
It is the second part of the Dragon Pass trilogy that began with White Bear and Red Moon. Although some counters for the planned third game were included with Nomad Gods, the third game of the trilogy was never published. Rules updates and additions were published in Wyrm's Footnotes. The 1977 game comes with a 22" x 26" hex map, 252 counters, and a profusely illustrated 72-page rulebook. In 1994 the game was revised and released as Les Dieux Nomades in French release by Oriflam. This adapted the original game to an updated version of the Dragon Pass rules.

The rules have been written to be useable in playing any one of the series. Though specific units appear in one game and not another, similar units work in similar fashion the games link mechanically, conceptually, and geographically.

— Greg Stafford & Stephen Martin, Nomad Gods v2 Rulebook (English), Chaosium 1995

The original designers Stafford and Robert Corbett, are credited along with Stephen Martin who led its development. Along with new units, all parts of the game were thoroughly revised including the game system. Production quality increased with full colour components. Expansions and corrections were included in The Book of Drastic Resolutions: Drastic Prax. The 2012 Vassal release was a digitized copy of the original 1977 board and counters. The rulebook was republished without the counters and map in 2017 by Chaosium as part of their Khan of Khans Kickstarter. Khan of Khans is set in the same background as Nomad Gods, but is a family card game.

== Gameplay ==
Playable by 2-5 people, each controls a nomadic tribe that roams a post-apocalyptic landscape called the Plains of Prax. Each tribe uses a unique set of combat skills as well as magic and the summoning of tribal deities to steal herd animals from other tribes. A counter called The Eternal Battle, representing gods frozen in time, moves randomly across the board, often destroying tribesmen that it encounters.

The game presents six different scenarios that often require, in part, capturing herds of livestock from another tribe.

== Reception ==
In the December–January 1977 edition of White Dwarf (Issue #4), Lew Pulsipher liked the unique setting, and the well organized rules that "use a step by step format, so even a novice fantasy gamer shouldn't have much trouble absorbing the game slowly but surely." Due to the complexity of the game, Pulsipher recommended that gamers start by playing the prequel, White Bear and Red Moon first, "because it resembles conventional two-player games more than Nomad Gods does, and because the second edition [of White Bear and Red Moon] has corrected typos and ambiguous rules, a treatment, Nomad Gods would profit from." Pulsipher concluded by recommending the game: "You won't find more stimulating fantasy boardgames anywhere." He gave the game an overall rating of 9 out of 10.

In the July–August 1977 edition of The Space Gamer (Issue No. 12), Robert C. Kirk liked Nomad Gods, commenting that "The game is easy to learn. The rules are eminently readable."

In the May 1978 edition of Dragon (Issue 14), J. Ward thought the detailing of the separate tribes and the well-written rules were reason enough for buying the game. He also liked the addition of magical combat. He did think a quirk in the rules gave tribes with fast bowmen an unfair advantage, and questioned why counters that could only be used in the planned third game of the Dragon Pass trilogy were included with this game. Ward concluded though, that "All in all, the game Nomad Gods works on so many levels that it can’t fail to be a real pleaser."

In the 1980 book The Complete Book of Wargames, game designer Jon Freeman commented, "The design and development of this game shows an understanding of fantasy and science fiction beyond the range of most other games." However Freeman noted, "The world hangs together nicely, but it's consistent, not self-explanatory. This makes it quite difficult for new players." Freeman gave this game an Overall Evaluation of "Good but highly specialized", concluding, "If you are willing to spend the time and effort to become familiar with the world of Glorantha, you'll find Nomad Gods or White Bear and Red Moon interesting and enjoyable; most people, though, when faced with such a wealth of strange detail and an absence of familiar reference points, will find the going too tough."
