= Prince Valiant (disambiguation) =

Prince Valiant is a comic strip created by Hal Foster and first published in 1937.

Prince Valiant may also refer to:

- Prince Valiant (1954 film), an American film adaptation of the comic
- Prince Valiant (1997 film), another film adaptation
- Prince Valiant: The Story-Telling Game, edited by Chaosium in 1989
- The Legend of Prince Valiant, a television series aired from 1991 to 1993.
