= King of Dragon Pass =

1999 video game

- Developers: A Sharp; HeroCraft (Mobile version)
- Publisher: A Sharp
- Producer: David Dunham
- Designers: David Dunham; Greg Stafford; Robin D. Laws
- Platforms: Windows, Mac OS, iOS, Android, Windows Phone
- Release: October 1999 (PC, Mac); September 2011 (iOS); August 2012 (GOG.com); August 2014 (Android); September 2014 (Windows Phone)
- Genres: Turn-based strategy, role-playing
- Mode: Single-player

King of Dragon Pass is a 1999 strategy simulation fantasy video game published by A Sharp. Set in the fictional world of Glorantha, the player controls the fate of a barbarian clan settling in the dangerous frontier region of Dragon Pass.

Originally released for PC, the game was a commercial failure. It was ported for iOS in 2011, and was later released for Android and re-released for PCs. The iOS versions were much more commercially successful than the original PC release, leading to a sequel, Six Ages: Ride Like The Wind, being released in 2018.

== Plot ==
The player controls a clan of Orlanthi (worshipers of the Storm God Orlanth) across several generations. Orlanthi clans bear some similarities to the Iron Age Nordic peoples, such as lawspeakers, fyrds, the worship of a thunder god and a reliance on raiding, as well as Bronze Age Celtic and Italic peoples aesthetically, with the appearance of many of the tribesmen reflecting these origins.

At the beginning of the game the clan has fled its home of Heortland after a foreign magician known as Belintar or 'the Pharaoh' usurps the throne. Along with dozens of other Orlanthi clans, the clan seeks to build a new home in Dragon Pass, a previously populated area left deserted after the Dragonkill War hundreds of years ago. With the Orlanthi clans variously feuding, allying, trading with and raiding each other, and a host of inhuman presences such as elves, dwarves and trolls, Dragon Pass is a free but dangerous frontier society compared to the tyrannical rule of the Pharaoh in Heortland. To the west, a persistent danger is the 'Horse-Spawn,' a society of nomadic mounted warriors.

As time passes by the clans form into 'tribes,' loose confederations of half a dozen clans. A prophet visits the player's clan to inform them of a great destiny. The player must guide the clan through seven heroquests (ritual re-enactments of feats of the gods) and successfully manage a number of events, including co-operating with other clans to build a town and making peace with the Horse-Spawn by marrying their queen (or, if the player's chieftain is female, their king). If the player is successful, the clan's chieftain unites the Orlanthi tribes and the Horse-Spawn into a kingdom, becoming King of Dragon Pass.

== Gameplay ==
The player controls the seven-member clan ring leading the clan, providing leadership to the clan in all aspects of its life, such as trading, warfare, agriculture and diplomacy. The player can make two macro-level decisions per each of the five seasons in the Gloranthan year. Random events are drawn from a pool of hundreds, ranging from mundane law disputes to spiritual or demonic incursions. They are often influenced by previous decisions and outcomes. In battle, the player determines the goals and preparations, and possibly chooses the actions of his nobles at pivotal moments.

To succeed, a player must balance the various needs of survival and prospering, as well as manage the problems presented by the setting or the clan individuals - a lack of food might be solvable by clearing more farmland, but when the forest responds by sending a talking fox to urge leaving the trees alone, a wrong choice could bring the clan hunters to war with their environment. Likewise, should a member of the clan act in a selfish and foolish manner, action needs to be taken to stabilize and defuse the situation, if necessary.

King of Dragon Pass contains no animation, instead depicting people and events with hand-drawn artwork. The game has elements of strategy, construction and management simulation, and role-playing video games.

== Production and release ==
King of Dragon Pass was conceived and developed by David Dunham, using his friend Greg Stafford's setting of Glorantha. At peak development, the A Sharp production team consisted of 12 people. The game cost $500,000 to make but only sold 8,000 boxed copies, rendering it a commercial failure. It sold disproportionately well in Finland thanks to a glowing review in Pelit.

King of Dragon Pass had initially been conceived for the Apple Newton. Following Apple's announcement of the iPhone in 2007, Dunham was drawn back to the potential of the game for a handheld platform, and an updated version of the game was released for iOS on September 8, 2011. This version was updated to be a universal iOS app for compatibility with the iPad on September 6, 2012. The original Windows version was re-released by GOG.com in 2012. Dunham announced in March 2013 that the iOS version had sold 30,000 copies.

HeroCraft ported the iOS version to Android and released it on August 12, 2014. A Windows Phone version, also by HeroCraft, was released a month later on September 23. A new PC version based on the Android version was released July 29, 2015; it runs on Windows or Mac OS X.

== Sequel ==
A sequel, Six Ages: Ride Like The Wind, was announced in 2014, released for iOS on June 28, 2018, and PC and Mac in 2019. A second sequel, Six Ages 2: Lights Going Out, was released for PC, Mac, and iOS in 2023.

== Reception ==
Reception

Aggregate score
Aggregator	Score
Metacritic	90/100 (iOS)

Review scores
Publication	Score
Computer Games Magazine	3/5 (Windows)
Computer Gaming World	2.5/5 (Windows)
GameSpy	75% (Windows)
PC PowerPlay	31% (Windows)
TouchArcade	5/5 (iOS)
Electric Playground	6.5/10 (Windows)
MacHome Journal	4.5/5 (MacOS)

King of Dragon Pass received mixed reviews upon release, and positive reviews upon its mobile release. According to review aggregation website Metacritic, the iOS version received "universal acclaim".

The game's hand painted watercolor artwork won the Best Visual Art prize in the 2000 Independent Games Festival. Rock, Paper, Shotgun described the game in retrospective in 2017 as "a management game, yes, but at its heart is an ongoing RPG chronicle." In 2016, the game placed 5th on Rock Paper Shotgun's The 50 best strategy games on PC list. Reviewing the iPhone version at TouchArcade, Eli Hodapp described it as "one of the most in-depth and strategic gameplay experiences I've had so far on my iPhone," describing the game as a conglomeration of Civilization and Choose Your Own Adventure.
