= King Arthur's Knights =

Arthurian board game

- Cover by Luise Perenne
- Designers: Greg Stafford
- Publishers: Chaosium
- Publication: 1978; 47 years ago
- Genres: Arthurian board game

King Arthur's Knights is an Arthurian board game published by Chaosium in 1978 in which knights of the Round Table perform chivalrous quests for artifacts and treasure.

== Description ==
King Arthur's Knights is a game for 2-5 players in which players serve as knights in King Arthur's court, questing across Arthurian Britain in search of holy objects, money, damsels to rescue and monsters to defeat.

=== Gameplay ===
Players first choose to be a knight errant, a knight at arms, or a great knight; the latter two classes face greater challenges and must accumulate higher victory points but earn greater rewards for success. Once everyone has chosen their knight, a magical treasure and a magical guardian are placed facedown on the map, and all knights set out from Camelot. Knights can choose to wander around the map, hoping to find adventure, or they can elect to draw a card from the Adventure deck and fulfill the resultant quest.

Players can engage each other in personal combat, but this is not a required element of the game.

The game comes with a paper map, a 16-page rulebook, eleven decks of encounter cards, and five cardstock knights — which must be affixed to some sort of base in order to be used — packaged in a zip-lock bag.

== Publication history ==
King Arthur's Knights was designed by Greg Stafford, and was published by Chaosium in 1978 with cover art by Luise Perenne.

== Reception ==
In the November 1978 edition of Dragon (Issue 21), Steve List admired the map and counters, but thought the knights printed on cardstock were poor, pointing out that the rulebook even suggests that players should substitute miniature figurines for them. List found the game "not very complicated and moves quickly" but overall believed it was designed more as a family game than one for hardcore gamers.

In Issue 34 of the British wargaming magazine Perfidious Albion, Charles Vasey and Geoffrey Barnard discussed the game. Vasey commented, "The game evidences the usual care Chaosium takes in providing the fantasy gamer with the same level of research that the historical gamer expects. The hundreds of characters, the adventures, the quests, just the names, all these contribute to the feeling that one is actually simulating the adventures that one read as a child ./.. The trouble is that the game can be long." Barnard replied, "I found this a very jolly game — it works well and is great fun. It needs a minimum of thought, after all, there is nothing to plan." Vasey concluded, :I found it accurate, amusing and interesting ... Highly recommended for clubs or conventions." Barnard concluded, "It is clear that the game will work best with a [large] number of players."

I Issue 15 of White Dwarf, Jacek Gabrielczyk stated that "On the whole the game is simple to understand. The rules are printed clearly in easy-to-read steps in a 16 page booklet with the three combat tables printed on the back cover. The physical quality of the game is quite good, the map especially. The only drawbacks are that no dice or reasonable counters are provided and the combat system depends too much on luck for a good result." Gabrielczyk gave it an overall rating of 7 out of 10.

In the inaugural edition of Ares, Greg Costikyan questioned its replayability, pointing out, "King Arthur's Knights is an enjoyable game for an evening's entertainment; it is not particularly sophisticated and palls after a few playings, but after all, so do most other games." Costikyan rated the game of 6 out of 9.

In the 1979 book The Playboys Winner's Guide to Board Games, game designer Jon Freeman called this an elaborate game set in "a well-researched legendary Britain." Freeman thought the game started well but "Unfortunately, the rules, initially quite clear and explicit, bog down severely about halfway through." The following year, in The Complete Book of Wargames, Freeman commented "Essentially this is a race-and-chase game" and called it "an introduction to role-playing games in a board game format. It's a lighthearted game, devoid of violence and horrible beasties, and quite suitable for children." Freeman did have an issue with the rulebook and components, saying, "Unfortunately the charts and tables are scattered hither and yon about the (rather long) rules, and except for the attractive four-color map, the components are rather primitive." Despite this, Freeman concluded by giving this game an Overall Evaluation of "Good."
