= Anaxial's Roster: Creatures of the Hero Wars =

Anaxial's Roster: Creatures of the Hero Wars is a 2000 role-playing game supplement published by Issaries, Inc. for Hero Wars.

== Contents ==
Anaxial's Roster: Creatures of the Hero Wars is a supplement in which creatures of Glorantha's continent Genertela are detailed.

== Reviews ==
- Envoyer
- Backstab #32 (as "L'Arche d'Anaxial")
