= A Companion to Superworld =

A Companion to Superworld is a 1984 role-playing game supplement published by Chaosium for Superworld.

== Contents ==
A Companion to Superworld is a supplement in which the game is expanded with new and variant rules, additional superpowers, and details of a superhero headquarters. It also introduces rules for weather and weather-based abilities, along with guidelines for converting Superworld characters to the Champions and Villains and Vigilantes game systems.

== Publication history ==
A Companion to Superworld was written by Steve Perrin and published by Chaosium in 1985 as a 72-page book.

== Reviews ==
- Comics Feature #36
