= Superworld =

Superhero-themed role-playing game

The SuperPowered RolePlaying Game
- Cover art by Michael Dooney
- Designers: Steve Perrin; Steve Henderson
- Illustrators: Michael Dooney; Chris Marrinan
- Publishers: Chaosium
- Publication: 1983 Boxed Set; 2015 PDF
- Genres: Superhero
- Systems: Basic Role-Playing

Superworld is a superhero-themed role-playing game published by Chaosium in 1983 that uses the generic Basic Role-Playing rules system. The game began as just one part of the Worlds of Wonder product before being published as a stand-alone game. In competition against other well-established and popular superhero games, Superworld never found an audience, and was discontinued after only three supplements were published for it.

== Game system ==
Superworld uses Chaosium's Basic Role-Playing system, with the addition of rules for super-powers.

=== Components ===
The game box contains

- three rules booklets
  - "Superheroes Book" (32 pages): character creation rules, the game system itself, and two character sheets with a male and female standing silhouette.
  - "Superpowers Book" (40 pages): the Powers available to the characters, Advantages and Disadvantages that can be applied to them, and Disabilities that can affect the character. The interior covers have two more character sheets, this time with silhouettes of a male and female in flight.
  - "Gamemasters Book" (40 pages): various aspects of a campaign, the legal system, animals, and the creation of organizations adapted to a superhero universe, with three specific examples: FIRE for Free Investigatory Research Enterprise, FORCE for Federal Organization for the Registration and Certification of Exotics, and the Omega Institute. The "Gamemasters Book" also includes two scenarios: "Deadly Devices of Doctor Dread", which pits a team of heroes against the Dr. Dread of the title and his subordinates, and "The Haunting", which describes a mysterious and ancient tome desired by a mystical super-villain.
- a booklet of character sheets,
- a booklet of tables for the Gamemaster,
- a page of cardboard figure silhouettes to be cut out,
- some 6-sided, 8-sided, and 20-sided dice.

Editions printed in 1984 and later also contain a 4-page booklet of errata.

=== Skills resolution ===
As with all games using the Basic Role-Playing rules, skill tests and combat are resolved by rolling percentile dice against skills. Rolls that are much lower than needed can result in increased effect, while high rolls can cause critical failures. Combat rules have many options and take into account three types of energy for damage: Kinetic, Electric, and Radiation.

== Publication history ==
In 1982, Chaosium published Worlds of Wonder to demonstrate the flexibility of its generic Basic Role-Playing System; the game included three separate settings with the idea that player characters could be moved from setting to setting using the same rules system:

- a fantasy setting called Magic World
- a science fiction setting, "Future World"
- a modern-day superhero setting, Superworld

The following year, Superworld was published as a stand-alone boxed set designed by Steve Perrin, with interior illustrations by Chris Marrinan and Mark Harrison, and cover art by Michael Dooney.

Cover of Trouble for HAVOC

Three supplements followed:

- Trouble for HAVOC (1984), three linked Superworld adventures by Stephen Perrin, Yurek Chodak, Donald Harrington, and Charles Huber. The adventures could be converted for use with rival superhero games Villains & Vigilantes or Champions.
- Bad Medicine for Dr. Drugs (1984), a Superworld adventure by Ken Rolston: Teen-aged heroes try to uncover a drug distribution ring in their high school after a classmate dies of an overdose. The adventure could be converted for use with Champions.
- A Companion to Superworld (1985), a rules supplement that included new super powers, a detailed plan of a superhero base, and effects of climate on play.

Up against well-established rival superhero games Villains & Vigilantes (Fantasy Games Unlimited) and Champions (Hero Games), Superworld was not able to establish a strong player base, and after A Companion to Superworld, Chaosium released no further supplements.

=== Wild Cards ===
The Wild Cards series of science fiction books came from a Superworld campaign gamemastered by George R. R. Martin, and played in by other science fiction writers.

== Reception ==
In White Dwarf #51, Jon Sutherland stated, "This represents an intelligent attempt to provide a playable format for a difficult topic to simulate." Sutherland concluded by giving this game overall rating of 7 out of 10, saying, "The only rules that I have ever seen with anything like this in scope was the Golden Heroes FRP which may soon be available in a modified form from [Games Workshop]."

In Issue 33 of Different Worlds, Russell Grant Collins commented, "I am going to use Superworld as the main game I run, although if I had not been between Champions universes, I might not have switched." Collins concluded, "If you are looking for a superhero role-playing game, this game is worth looking at. If you are running a campaign using another system, you should probably buy this game as a reference, even if you do not think that you will use it as your main system. Now, Chaosium, how about some support material, like a villain book or some modules?"

In Ares #17, Steve Marsh noted "The game is anything but chaotic, but should create change in any gaming group that sees it. It is well done, and worth the price."

In Space Gamer No. 70, Crede Lambard commented "Superworld is very good. I doubt that it will ever supplant Champions, but it certainly supplements it . . . especially now that both Hero Games and Chaosium are putting out adventures with stats for both games."

In Issue 33 of Abyss, Lew Bryson found a lot to like, noting "Chris Marrinan's art is ... the best in any of these [superhero] games ... Characters and attitudes are good, the best, in fact. I really like their ideas [and] the two scenarios are interesting, peppered with little plot twists." However, Bryson found the mechanics to be the game's downfall, noting the excessive dice rolling required, and the requirement to use Hero Points to buy firearms. Despite these issues, Bryson concluded, "Still, there is a wealth of imagination here. Most of Superworld is sound ... I liked Superworld, it's one of the more adult superhero games on the market."

In his 1990 book The Complete Guide to Role-Playing Games, game critic Rick Swan commented, "The prolific Steve Perring did a bang-up job, creating one of the most fully realized and shamefully overlooked superhero RPGs ever published." Swan liked the game mechanics, calling them "smooth and exciting, particularly the combat system, which encourages melodramatic slugfests comparable to those in comic books." Swan concluded by giving the game a rating of 3 out of 4, saying, "Though the game has a few glitches ... none are particularly troubling. A first-class game."

== See also ==
- Metahuman
