= Raiders and Traders =

1979 board game

- Cover art by Donald Dupont
- Designers: Donald Dupont
- Illustrators: Donald Dupont
- Publishers: Chaosium
- Publication: 1979
- Genres: Ancient history

Raiders and Traders, subtitled "The Heroic Age of Greece", is a board game published by Chaosium in 1979 that simulates the world of Hellenic Greece.

== Description ==
Raiders and Traders is a board game for 2–6 players where each player attempts to build an empire in the setting of ancient Greece. The game components include a map of the Aegean Basin, 300 counters, 80 money pieces, and 40 player cards.

There are three scenarios:

- Raiding: Players conduct raids to expand into other territories.
- The Beginning: Indo-European tribes migrate into the Aegean Basin, and select patron gods, build walled settlements, make beneficial marriages, and use diplomacy to expand their territory.
- Empire: Pirates and random action cards are added to play.

There are also optional rules for deities, the Oracle of Delphi, and Heroes (who bring both advantages and disadvantages to the player.)

== Publication history ==
Raiders and Traders was created by Donald Dupont and published by Chaosium in 1979 as a boxed set with cover art by Dupont.

== Reception ==
In Issue 45 of the British wargaming magazine Perfidious Albion, Charles Vasey liked the components and the "clear rules with an excellent summary sheet." Vasey concluded, "Piracy, raiding, empire building, family marriages et al all have their place. There is an overrun rule which unbalances the games, but the basic system is interesting, testing, and it's multiplayer."

In Issue 29 of Dragon (September 1979), Jim Ward called this "a perfect collection of all the concepts that anyone who has taken the time to study that era could have formed." Ward noted that the game with all of the optional rules "force players to think fast and move fast in the efforts to win." Ward concluded, "The game has many interesting facets and can be played on several levels from a beginning/nongamer's standpoint, to the most veteran wargamers side."
