= Extreme Paranoia: Nobody Knows the Trouble I've Shot =

1991 novel by Ken Rolston

- Author: Ken Rolston
- Language: English
- Publisher: West End Games
- Publication date: 1991

Extreme Paranoia: Nobody Knows the Trouble I've Shot is a 1991 novel written by Ken Rolston and published by West End Games, set in the world of the role-playing game Paranoia.

== Contents ==
Extreme Paranoia: Nobody Knows the Trouble I've Shot is a novel in which Troubleshooter Homer-R-ICK and his team deal with the bureaucracy of Alpha Complex.

== Reception ==
S. John Ross reviewed Extreme Paranoia (Nobody Knows The Trouble I've Shot) in White Wolf #29 (Oct./Nov., 1991), rating it a 4 out of 5 and stated that "Absolutely any Paranoia fan, active player or not, should read this book. Those interested in an introduction to the madness will find it very accommodating, and it costs less than the rules. GMs and players looking for renewed sense inspiration or just a stock of new ideas won't be disappointed."

== Reviews ==
- Review by John C. Bunnell (1991) in Dragon Magazine, September 1991

== See also ==
- List of Paranoia books
