= Reich (board game) =

1979 board game

- Cover art by William Church
- Designers: Jonathan Michael
- Illustrators: William Church
- Publishers: Chaosium
- Publication: 1979
- Genres: Unification of Germany

Reich, subtitled "The Iron Dream of German Unification", is a board game published by Chaosium in 1979 that simulates the unification of Germany.

== Background ==
In the mid-19th century, what is now Germany was fragmented into 26 duchies, kingdoms, principalities and free cities. Several politicians expressed interested in unification as long as their home state dominated the new country.

== Description ==
Reich is a board game for up to 4 players, where each player is a Prince trying to unify Germany through social forces such Marxist agitation, religious riots, peasant uprisings, revolts, Papal recognition, key ministers, foreign intervention and aid, mobilizations, and wars. The color map shows the German-speaking states (except Bohemia and Austria). Other components include 300 counters, money counters and 40 player cards. The concept of the game is to gather enough states, either through diplomacy or military conquest, to be declared Emperor.

=== Gameplay ===
After each player has chosen a Prince and has received starting money, the first player draws a card. Then all players can choose to play a card. After card play, the active player then decides to either

- tax their states to raise more money
- emplace or remove a diplomat from another player's state
- or mobilize troops with the intention of using them.

== Publication history ==
Reich was created by Jonathan Michael and published by Chaosium in 1979 as a boxed set with cover art by William Church.

== Reception ==
In Issue 45 of the British wargaming magazine Perfidious Albion, Charles Vasey commented, "The whole style of the game is towards the abstract ...with the skill [needed] being mastering play and diplomacy." Although the rulebook stated that a game could be played in two hours, Vasey noted that his three-player test game had been abandoned without a winner after five hours. Vasey concluded, "Far from a stupid game, I found it a little too ahistorical for my tastes but it was certainly challenging."

In Issue 29 of Dragon (September 1979), Jim Ward initially liked the game, finding, "It is easy to play; the concept is clean and neat ... Unfortunately, it does have some serious design flaws that can make it difficult to play." Ward noted that the player cards were the root of the problem, pointing out, "Problems arise in the duration of effect for some cards, the concept of assassination and how it is prevented; and cards demand action that is sometimes not possible. There are just too many terms that can be used in more than one way, forcing the game to be unclear." Despite this, Ward concluded, "I would recommend that wargamers try this game. It only requires an agreement by all players on the meaning of a batch of cards that are used. It is a fun game."
