= Six Ages: Ride Like the Wind =

2018 video game

- Developer: A Sharp
- Publishers: A Sharp (iOS); Kitfox Games (PC)
- Platform: iOS; macOS; Microsoft Windows
- Release: June 28, 2018 (iOS); October 17, 2019 (PC)
- Genre: Strategy simulation
- Mode: Single-player

Six Ages: Ride Like the Wind is a 2018 strategy simulation fantasy video game developed by A Sharp, and the sequel to the 1999 game King of Dragon Pass. The game was released for iOS on June 28, 2018, followed by a Windows version on October 17, 2019. Set in the fictional world of Glorantha, the player controls the fate of a semi-nomadic clan trying to survive during a mythical period when deities walked among mortals. The game was positively received by critics, who cited its story, art and gameplay. It was followed by Six Ages 2: Lights Going Out.

== Gameplay ==
Six Ages: Ride Like the Wind follows the same format as King of Dragon Pass, combining several genres of game, including interactive fiction, role-playing, and turn-based strategy. The player controls the seven-member clan ring leading the clan, providing leadership to the clan in all aspects of its life, such as trading, warfare, agriculture and diplomacy. The player can make two macro-level decisions per each of the five seasons in the Gloranthan year. Random events are drawn from a pool of hundreds, ranging from mundane law disputes to spiritual or demonic incursions. They are often influenced by previous decisions and outcomes. In battle, the player determines the goals and preparations, and possibly chooses the actions of his nobles at pivotal moments.

To succeed, a player must balance the various needs of survival and prospering, as well as manage the problems presented by the setting or the clan individuals - a lack of food might be solvable by clearing more farmland, but when the forest responds by sending a talking fox to urge leaving the trees alone, a wrong choice could bring the clan hunters to war with their environment. Likewise, should a member of the clan act in a selfish and foolish manner, action needs to be taken to stabilize and defuse the situation, if necessary.

== Development ==
Game developer A Sharp is based in Tacoma, Washington. It released King of Dragon Pass in 1999, and the game was a commercial failure, selling only 8000 copies. The game was re-released for iOS devices in 2011 and became a surprise success, leading the game to be ported to other mobile devices as well as PC. This success also generated interest in a follow-up game with the same setting and gameplay, with A Sharp announcing development on the game in 2014.

Like its predecessor, Six Ages: Ride Like The Wind takes place in the fantasy world of Glorantha. A Sharp worked on Six Ages: Ride Like The Wind for four years. There were two lead developers on the project, namely David Dunham and Robin Laws. While the game has over 468,000 words of text, Dunham expected that players would encounter a quarter of it in a single play through. Although the game follows the template of King of Dragon Pass, this game drops the warrior-farmer conflict seen in the previous title, instead introducing the family politics of the different clan advisors.

== Reception ==
Reception

Aggregate score
Aggregator	Score
Metacritic	87/100 (PC)

Six Ages: Ride Like the Wind received an aggregate score of 87/100 according to review aggregator Metacritic, indicating "generally favorable reviews". PCMag gave the game its editor's choice award, calling it a "unique experience" in praise of its "rich story, lovely art, and haunting world". Rock Paper Shotgun also gave it their editorial award of "Bestest Bests", and Sin Vega wrote that it improved on King of Dragon Pass in every way. PC Gamer compared the title to Crusader Kings 2, with more "weird events" and without the real-time grand strategy map, saying that "there is no experience quite like Six Ages, and I'm just glad to be back in Glorantha again". The PC Gamer review score of 88% made it one of their highest rated games all year.

=== Awards ===
Rock Paper Shotgun celebrated the game for its exploration of mythology, later awarding it the 18th best strategy game on PC, and the 38th best role-playing game. PC Gamer also noted it as one of their highest reviewed games of the decade, while PCMag called it one of the best iPad games of 2022.
