= Ken Rolston =

American game designer

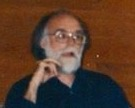
- Occupations: Computer game and pen and paper role-playing game designer

Ken Rolston is an American computer game and role-playing game designer best known for his work with West End Games and on the computer game series The Elder Scrolls.

== Tabletop role-playing games ==
Ken Rolston began working as a professional games designer in 1982. Rolston spent twelve years as an award-winning designer of tabletop role-playing games. His credits include games and supplements for Paranoia, RuneQuest, Warhammer Fantasy Roleplay, Advanced Dungeons & Dragons, and Dungeons & Dragons.

Ken Rolston worked as a writer on Basic Role-Playing for Chaosium. Rolston also worked on the Stormbringer and Superworld lines for Chaosium. Rolston joined the Paranoia team as its fourth creator soon after he was hired at West End Games in 1983, and he was responsible for adding atmosphere to the rules written by Greg Costikyan, the results of which were published at GenCon in 1984. Rolston wrote a complete manuscript for a magic system for Games Workshop to use in Warhammer Fantasy Roleplay, but they rejected it; the manuscript by Rolston spent years circulating on the internet instead. Rolston left West End Games when Scott Palter decided to move the company from New York to rural Honesdale, Pennsylvania in 1988. Chaosium stopped producing material for RuneQuest through Avalon Hill in 1989, but they returned to RuneQuest in 1992 with Rolston as editor. Rolston started the "RuneQuest Renaissance" with his first publication in the line being Sun County (1992) from Tales of the Reaching Moon contributor Michael O'Brien . Avalon Hill dropped Rolston as a staff member in 1994, keeping him on as a freelancer; his last two books Strangers in Prax and Lords of Terror were published that year, and he went on afterwards to work at a multimedia company.

Rolston also was winner of the H. G. Wells Award for Best Role-playing Game, Paranoia, 1985, and served as role-playing director for West End Games, Games Workshop, and Avalon Hill Game Company.

In 2016, Rolston joined Mongoose Games to assist in editing a new edition of Paranoia, which was Kickstarted in 2014, in order to "hit all the right notes for both veteran players and newbies alike."

== Video game industry ==
Rolston was the lead designer for Bethesda's role-playing game The Elder Scrolls III: Morrowind, its expansions and was also lead designer for The Elder Scrolls IV: Oblivion. From 2007 he was lead designer for two Big Huge Games projects, both of which were canceled in 2009.

Rolston went on to be the lead creative visionary for Kingdoms of Amalur: Reckoning, a single player RPG designed by Big Huge Games, a Baltimore subsidiary of 38 Studios.

== Selected works ==
Year	Title	Type	Role(s)
1987	Paranoia, 2nd edition	Tabletop role-playing game	Writer
1989	Something Rotten in Kislev for Warhammer Fantasy Roleplay	Tabletop role-playing game	Writer
1991	Extreme Paranoia: Nobody Knows the Trouble I've Shot	Novel	Writer
1997	An Elder Scrolls Legend: Battlespire	Video game	Design and Dialogue
1998	The Elder Scrolls Adventures: Redguard	Video game	Additional Writing
2000	Sea Dogs	Video game	Additional design and writing
2002	The Elder Scrolls III: Morrowind	Video game	Lead designer
2003	Pirates of the Caribbean	Video game	Additional design and writing
2006	The Elder Scrolls IV: Oblivion	Video game	Lead designer
2012	Kingdoms of Amalur: Reckoning	Video game	Executive design director
2017	The Long Dark	Video game	Designer-in-residence
