= Elric: Battle at the End of Time =

Fantasy board wargame

Elric
Battle at the End of Time
- Cover by Steve Leialoha and Steve Oliff
- Other names: Elric
- Designers: Greg Stafford; Charlie Krank
- Illustrators: Steve Oliff; William Church
- Publishers: Chaosium
- Publication: 1982; 44 years ago
- Genres: Fantasy board wargame

Elric: Battle at the End of Time is a board wargame published by Chaosium in 1982, an update of the 1977 game simply titled Elric. It is based on the Elric of Melniboné books by Michael Moorcock. There have been three English language editions, Elric (1977) and Elric: Battle at the End of Time (1982), both published by Chaosium, and Elric (1984), published by Avalon Hill.

== Gameplay ==
Elric is a game about Elric of Melniboné, the central protagonist in a series of novels by Michael Moorcock. In each scenario of the game, players are assigned primary personalities from the novels, and the players then draw cards which allow the players to "muster" additional personalities and armies.

== Publication history ==
The original 1977 edition, titled Elric, came packaged in a ziplock bag with a rule book, a paper map and counters. In 1982, the game, with updated and revised rules and upgraded production values, was renamed Elric: Battle at the End of Time. The game now came packaged in a box, and included a 12-page rules folio, a 22" x 34" map, and 320 die-cut double-sided counters. The price was increased from $12 to $20. In 1984, Avalon Hill published an edition of the game based on the 1982 Chaosium edition, with updated box art. Hobby Japan released a Japanese language version based on the 1984 edition.

== Reception ==
In the November–December 1977 edition of The Space Gamer (Issue No. 14), Neil Shapiro liked the game, saying, "Elric is more than a game. It is a very accurate, emotional representation of one of Fantasy literature's greatest sagas. It is a myth made real and brought to the gameboard. As an examination of one Cycle of Moorcock's Eternal Champion, it is unique. As a game, it has few equals."

In Issue 27 of the British wargaming magazine Perfidious Albion, Charles Vasey and Geoffrey Barnard discussed this game. Vasey commented, "The rules are open to abuses ... but a house-ruling should sort this out. The system is fun and not very serious but it does have the right atmosphere ... Combat is perhaps too simple and replacements too generous." Barnard replied, "I actually found this game mildly amusing ... in spite of my having no knowledge of the books, I had some idea of what to do." Vasey concluded by recommending it to "those who like a good fun game with multi-player possibilities." Barnard concluded, "I feel sure that for the uninitiate, this game will be a lot more interesting than [The War of the Ring], and will certainly be more worth playing."

In The Playboy Winner's Guide to Board Games, game designer Jon Freeman noted that "The rules to Elric are a mess — full of grammatical and typographical atrocities, misspellings, nonwords, and confusing nonsentences." Freeman also thought luck played too great a factor, commenting "the random, Cheshire Cat behavior of Elric minimizes any exercise of skill and helps limit the audience [...] to people hopelessly addicted to Moorcock's brand of sword-and-sorcery."

Gary Porter reviewed Elric for White Dwarf #6, giving it an overall rating of 7 out of 10, and stated that "Elric is a credit to its designer, publisher and original begetter. The lack of hexes on the map and the movement and replacement rules are very reminiscent of Russian Civil War - no bad thing. The original features: the magic cards, the battalia, the cosmic balance, etc., make this a fantasy game apart."

Several years later, Patrick Amory re-reviewed Elric in the October 1980 edition of The Space Gamer (Issue No. 32), and judged that the game had held up over the past three years: "the first scenario is smooth-playing, pleasantly unpredictable, and entertaining. As it simulates very accurately the chaos and adventure of Elric's world, the game will appeal to Moorock fans."

Murray Writtle reviewed Elric for White Dwarf #33, giving it an overall rating of 7 out of 10, and stated that "All in all an enjoyable game, recreating the books quite successfully, though a little slow to play and subject to a fair degree of chance."

In the December 1982 edition of Dragon (Issue #68), Tony Watson reviewed the revised edition, and although he liked the new components, he found for a game of strategic army combat to be too simple, and questioned the replay value: "The rules for conducting these campaigns are simplistic and uninteresting... I found the play of the game to be a bit meandering and lacking direction. This is not a game that seems to have much replay value... If atmosphere were all that mattered, Chaosium would have a winner, but as it stands, Elric is basically a game that’s all dressed up with nowhere to go, recommended for die-hard Elric fans only."

In a retrospective review of the 1984 version of Elric in Black Gate, John ONeill said "Avalon Hill made a good show of it, replacing Chaosium's notoriously flimsy components — especially their paper maps and thin counters — with their own hard-stock folding maps and firm counters. The rather dense rules, however [...] survived."

Game editions

Elric, 1977 edition
cover by Steve Leialoha

Elric, 1984 edition
cover by Kenn Nishiuye

Elric, Hobby Japan edition
cover by Yoshitaka Amano
