= Prince Valiant: The Story-Telling Game =

Tabletop fantasy role-playing game

- Cover art by Hal Foster
- Years active: 1989
- Genres: Arthurian fantasy

Prince Valiant: The Story-Telling Game is a licensed role-playing game published by Chaosium in 1989 that is based on Hal Foster's comic strip of the same name.

== Description ==
In Prince Valiant, players take on the roles of knights in King Arthur's court, taking part in adventures styled after the Prince Valiant comics. The game is designed for children and young adults, with an emphasis on story-telling — designer Greg Stafford claimed that Prince Valiant was the first story-telling role-playing game. The basic game mechanics, covered in a single page, are intentionally simple so as to emphasize story-telling over rules. More advanced rules are available that include more skills such as Bargaining, Disguise, and Farming.

Although there is a gamemaster called a Storyteller, all the players are responsible for telling part of the story. As Greg Stafford explained in an interview: "Each player ... owns part of the scenario and must present it to the others, who themselves know other elements of the story, so everyone participates in the evolution of the plot."

=== Character generation ===
Each player creates a knight by:

- Dividing seven points between two attributes, Brawn and Presence.
- Assigning 9 points to a list of 14 knightly skills such as Agility, Archery, Fellowship, Healing, and Hunting.
- Choosing a name for the knight.
- Describing the knight's background, appearance and personality.

=== Skill and combat resolution ===
The game substitutes coin flips for dice rolling to resolve all combat and skill challenges. The points each character was assigned for attributes and skills represent a certain number of coins. One knight, for example, might have an assigned Brawn of 5 points and a Presence of 3 points; when a situation calls for Brawn, the player in question flips five coins, and is successful if any of them come up "Heads". In combat or jousting, both opponents flip their respective number of coins — the one with the most heads is the winner.

=== Health and achievements ===
Rather than measuring a character's health with hit points, a character loses Brawn coins, and must rest or be Healed to recover Brawn.

As the game progresses, a knight's achievements are measured by Fame points; the character with the highest number of Fame points is the party leader. Fame points can be exchanged for higher coin ratings in certain skills.

=== Scenarios ===
The game book includes twenty short adventures.

== Publication history ==
The weekly comic strip Prince Valiant was created by Hal Foster in 1937 and rapidly became popular, appearing weekly in more than 300 American newspapers via King Features Syndicate. In 1989, Chaosium acquired the game license, and Greg Stafford created the 128-page softcover book Prince Valiant: The Story-Telling Game, with contributions from William Dunn and Lynn Willis and with black-and-white artwork by Hal Foster and John Cullen Murphy.

Peter Corless, writing in the 2002 book King Arthur in Popular Culture, noted that "the game was modestly received, discontinued, and is now out of print".

Game historian St Horvath noted, "Greg Stafford's love of the legends of King Arthur is well known, and his admiration for Hal Foster glow bright in the pages of the Prince Valiant rulebook, but ... this was not a property that people were going to go wild for. It sold slowly."

In 2019, Nocturnal Media released an updated version of the game as a hardcover book with full color illustrations.

=== Translations ===
In October 1990, the game was translated and published into Spanish by the Spanish publishing house Joc Internacional (translator: Juan Ignacio Sánchez Pérez).

== Reception ==
In his 1990 book The Complete Guide to Role-Playing Games, game critic Rick Swan called this game "a near-perfect introductory RPG" and noted that "the game is packed with other clever touches". Swan also commented that "excellent sections on staging adventures, the history of the original comic strip, and magic and monsters complete the game." Swan only had one reservation, finding that "the focus of the game seems too narrow for extended play; this could've been alleviated somewhat with the inclusion of a long adventure instead of the brief scenarios included at the end of the book". Swan concluded by giving this game an excellent rating of 3.5 out of 4.

In his 1991 book Heroic Worlds, Lawrence Schick called this game a "simple and elegant introductory system" and noted it was "profusely illustrated with wonderful Hal Foster art". Schick also commented that "the guidelines on how to role-play are as valuable for experienced players as for novices."

In the 2010 book Family Games: The 100 Best, Robin D. Laws thought this was one role-playing game that would appeal to all ages, writing that it serves up "thrill and derring-do with a positive, clean-cut context. [Its] reassuring good nature appeals to younger kids, though [it] offers plenty of Vikings, clashing swords, and suits of armor to hook the fancy of older ones." Laws concluded with a strong recommendation, saying: "The solid structure of Prince Valiant provides the ideal platform for the family gamer to introduce his or her brood to the joys of role-playing. This is only fitting, as lead designer Greg Stafford's love of storytelling in general and the classic strips of Hal Foster shines through on every infectious page."

In his 2014 book Designers & Dragons, game historian Shannon Appelcline noted the "strong, storytelling basis, the use of a coin as a randomizer, a one-page game system, matched player and character reward systems, and an early troupe style system that allowed players to become storytellers for brief scenes" and commented "Prince Valiant was unsupplemented, but if it had received more attention, it probably would have become a pivotal storytelling game, as important for its new roleplaying ideas as other releases of the time like Chaosium's own Pendragon (1985), Lion Rampant's Ars Magica (1987), and White Wolf's Vampire: The Masquerade (1991). Even without that, some 'indie' designers of the modern day note its influence."

In his 2023 book Monsters, Aliens, and Holes in the Ground, RPG historian Stu Horvath noted, "In the coming decade [the 1990s], RPGs would move away from elaborate systems of simulation and become interested in encouraging narrative in a variety of ways ... The game might not owe a direct debt to Prince Valiant, but Prince Valiant was nevertheless at the forefront of a new style of play."
