= Shaman's Drum =

- Discipline: Shamanism
- Language: English

Publication details
- History: 1985–2010
- Publisher: Cross-Cultural Shamanism Network
- Frequency: Quarterly

Standard abbreviations
- ISO 4: Shaman's Drum

Indexing
- ISSN: 0887-8897
- LCCN: 91640579

Shaman's Drum was a periodical devoted to experiential shamanism. It was published between 1985 and 2010, when it ceased publication. It was originally edited by Timothy White and published by the Cross-Cultural Shamanism Network (a nonprofit educational organization).

The mission of the magazine was to encourage and support the practice of shamanism from an experiential perspective of shamans and other practitioners. In order to consolidate contemporary and ancient shamanic methodologies, Shaman's Drum regularly examined traditional, non-traditional and contemporary forms of shamanism and methodology: ranging from Siberian ecstatic seances and Tibetan trance oracles to Amazonian ayahuasca rituals and Native American healing ceremonies. The journal took the view that shamanism is a universal human phenomenon, or complex of phenomena, that ultimately transcends culture or tradition.

In 2011 its website announced that there were plans to continue via the Shaman's Drum Foundation, an on-line publication with associated electronic archives. As of April 2019 there is a way to order some back issues of the Journal with future plans, "to maintain an archive of educational and historic shamanic material".
