= Sun County =

Role-playing game supplement

- Publisher: Avalon Hill
- Publication date: 1992
- ISBN: 978-1-56882-540-3

Sun County is a 1992 role-playing supplement for RuneQuest published by Avalon Hill.

== Contents ==
Sun County is a supplement in which a militaristic theocracy is detailed.

== Publication history ==
Shannon Appelcline detailed how Ken Rolston at Avalon Hill "kicked off the 'RuneQuest Renaisssance', which saw the production of the best official books ever for RQ3. His first publication was Tales of the Reaching Moon contributor Michael O'Brien's Sun County (1992). It, and the releases that followed, were all perfectly bound books that were cheaper and more durable than the older boxes." Appelcline also notes how "Chaosium had very little to do with the publications. This soon became obvious when Greg Stafford contradicted Michael O'Brien's excellent RuneQuest sourcebook, Sun County (1992), with his first unfinished work, The Glorious ReAscent of Yelm. This even that led to the creation of the term 'gregging', which described Stafford making a new discovery in the world of Glorantha that might contradict fan publications."

== Reception ==
Phillip Hessel reviewed Sun County in White Wolf #42 (April, 1994), rating it a 3 out of 5 and stated that "The Harvest Festival material takes up nearly a fifth of the book. Roleplayers will probably love it; blood-and-treasure hounds will probably be bored."

== Reviews ==
- Dragon #188
- The Last Province (Issue 1 - Oct 1992)
- Casus Belli (Issue 71 - Sep 1992)
