= Six Ages 2: Lights Going Out =

- Developer: A Sharp
- Publisher: Kitfox Games
- Engine: UIKit, Unity
- Platforms: iOS; macOS; Windows
- Release: WW: August 21, 2023
- Genres: Role-playing, strategy
- Mode: Single-player

Six Ages 2: Lights Going Out is a 2023 video game developed by A Sharp and published by Kitfox Games. It is set in the fantasy world of Glorantha and is the sequel to Six Ages: Ride Like the Wind. It has elements of strategy and role-playing games. Players attempt to lead their barbarian tribe through apocalyptic events.

== Gameplay ==
Players lead a clan in the fantasy setting Glorantha. The gameplay combines elements of strategy and role-playing games. Players must make decisions on various issues affecting their clan, aided by the advice of a council. The scenarios presented give players several choices to make, such as whether to break off a raid on a rival tribe to fight a common enemy. Amid these troubles, the forces of chaos begin killing the gods and assaulting reality itself. Players must make decisions that will safeguard their clan during these apocalyptic events and give their descendants a chance to survive. The scenarios are randomly selected in each gameplay session, as are the members of the council, who can have their own stories play out.

== Development ==
Game developer A Sharp was based in Tacoma, Washington. Kitfox Games released Six Ages 2: Lights Going Out for macOS, Windows, and iOS on August 21, 2023.

== Reception ==
The iOS version received "universal acclaim" on Metacritic, a review aggregator. Labeling it a "Bestest Best" game, Rock Paper Shotgun said it is part of a unique series of games that provide "a wealth of thoughtful, amusing stories" that show how a fantasy world can evolve. Siliconera said it "can be quite engrossing" and improves on the previous game without changing the user interface or gameplay too much. Pocket Gamer said it is "a phenomenal choice-led narrative experience" and an excellent advertisement for the world of Glorantha. TouchArcade, who described it as "a real winner", said players new to the series' complexity may have a rough start but called Six Ages 2: Lights Going Out the most accessible Glorantha-set game so far.
