= HeroQuest (role-playing game) =

2000 Tabletop role-playing game by Robin Laws

- 2nd edition cover by Jon Hodgson
- Designers: Robin D. Laws
- Publishers: Issaries, Inc.; Moon Design Publications; Chaosium
- Publication: 2000 (Hero Wars); 2003 (HeroQuest); 2009 (HeroQuest 2nd ed.); 2015 (HeroQuest Glorantha); 2020 (QuestWorlds SRD)
- Genres: Universal
- Systems: Narrative

HeroQuest is a role-playing game written by Robin D. Laws first published as Hero Wars by Issaries, Inc. in 2000. It has its roots in Greg Stafford's fantasy world of Glorantha, but was designed as a generic system, suitable for, but not tied to any particular genre.

The game's mechanics are focused on quick resolution; Contests are resolved by comparing the results of two twenty-sided dice, each tied to a character ability chosen by players and/or narrator. After the die roll, the participants work together to interpret the outcome in story terms.

In 2020 Moon Design sold the HeroQuest trademark to Hasbro, rebranding HeroQuest as QuestWorlds.

== The game system ==
HeroQuest focuses on dramatic presentation and storytelling techniques:

Who Prospers?

It is an unavoidable fact that all roleplaying games favor certain player skill sets. Where some games reward memorization, an instinct for math, and the willingness to comb through multiple rulebooks for the most useful super powers, HeroQuest tips the scales for creative improvisation, verbal acuity, and a familiarity with the techniques and stereotypes of popular fiction.

— Introduction, HeroQuest Core Rules

The system is built around abilities and keywords. A keyword is a broad term to sum up several abilities, such as a profession or a homeland or culture.

=== Character creation ===
There are three main methods to create a character: prose, list, or "as-you-go".

In the prose method, the player describes the character in a couple of sentences for a total of 100 words. The player then selects words and phrases from the description to be used as character abilities. Depending on the game setting, the description can include keywords to indicate a character's profession, homeland, and other affiliations; keywords can be used to imply certain abilities.

In the list method, the player starts with choosing one or more keywords as appropriate for the setting, and then chooses up to ten additional abilities and up to three flaws.

In the as-you-go method a player states their character concept and defines keywords and abilities during play based on what they think their character would know.

=== Keywords and abilities ===
Characters are defined by a list of their abilities. Keywords are an optional rule that allows abilities to be grouped together for simplicity. For example, a character might have a keyword representing their occupation, and this is assumed to contain all abilities relating to that occupation. Other keywords might cover the character's background culture, homeland or magical tradition.

Abilities are given a level from 1 to 20, to represent how good the character is at using that ability to solve problems. Keyword ratings cover all the abilities within that keyword. For example, a character with a warrior rating of 17 can reasonably be expected to be able to sword fight at that level. However, characters are further defined by adding points to abilities, and can raise the default levels above their starting point. If a warrior is very good at sword fighting, then that ability would be raised. Once an ability is raised above 20, the character gains a level of mastery (see the game mechanics section).

One of the main differences in HeroQuest's use of abilities, as compared to other roleplaying games, is that they are not limited to describing skills and capability, but may also describe areas of expertise, relationships, personality traits, magic spells, technological implants, superpowers and possessions, depending on the genre of the game being played. Each one is equal to the others. Sword fighting at 17 is just as capable as angry at 17. Both could be used to win a sword fight, provided the character is angry. Because of this, a character's personality and relationships are just as important as their skills. Abilities can also augment each other. In the example above, sword fighting 17 and angry 17 could be used together giving a better target number. In play, this means that when players are pursuing goals in line with their character's abilities, they can be extremely capable and are more likely to see success than if they ignore some of those building blocks.

There are a few more types of abilities, such as equipment, followers, and magic. Everything is defined using the same system. The adaptability and ease of expansion of these basic concepts are what helped make the system popular for use in other settings and genres among its followers.

=== Game mechanics ===
The resolution mechanic is built around a pair of twenty-sided dice. One die is rolled for the character's ability, the other for the resistance, a score chosen by the narrator. This can be an ability of a supporting (non-player) character or a resistance score of an impersonal obstacle or a force of nature.

In HeroQuest players do not compare the numbers thrown, but instead compare the implied results. Results rank from fumble through failure and success to critical. A success is scored if the die roll does not exceed the ability score, with a 1 indicating a critical success. If the die roll exceeds the ability score, the result is a failure, while a 20 indicates a fumble (critical failure).

The two results are then compared to determine the level of victory (or defeat):

- Complete – results differ by 3 levels (e.g., Critical vs Fumble)
- Major – 2 levels (e.g. Success vs Fumble, or Critical vs Failure)
- Minor – 1 level (e.g. Success vs Failure)
- Marginal Victory or tie (When results are equal, the lower die roll wins)

In keeping with the narrativist philosophy of the game, the most recent version of the rules (Heroquest Core Rules, 2009) suggests that resistances offered by the narrator should generally not be chosen based on any objective assessment of the challenge to be faced, but should rather reflect the dramatic requirements of the story. A side-effect of this is that most published scenarios do not contain statistics for opposing non-player characters or other obstacles, requiring instead that the narrator chooses the level of difficulty that supplies the appropriate dramatic effect.

Most obstacles are dealt with via simple contest, requiring only one die roll. Important events such as the climactic end scene of the story may be run as extended contests, in which several simple contests are run with a score being kept of which side is ahead and which is behind.

==== Modifiers ====
Narrators may apply modifiers (bonuses or penalties) to target scores to reflect specific situational factors, such as hurt or impaired characters, characters overcoming more than one opponent, or the use of specialised or inappropriate abilities in a particular contest.

Players may apply augments (bonuses) to their target scores by using other abilities to boost their main one, or by having other characters render them some form of assistance.

==== Masteries ====
Once an ability surpasses 20, it gains a level of mastery, noted by a rune (ш) and then drops down to 1. So instead of 21, the character would have a 1ш. This cycle repeats, so after 20ш, one gets 1ш2, signifying two masteries. The first edition book lists some godlike powers up to 12 masteries (ш12), as this system allows for limitless scaling without a huge burden of additional dice or complex math.

In a contest, masteries first cancel each other out. So a conflict between a 4ш and a 12ш is mechanically identical to a 4ш2 against a 12ш2 or a 4ш3 vs 12ш3, as they both resolve to a 4 against a 12.

When masteries differ, such as a 4ш2 against a 12ш, then the remainder gives the character with the higher mastery an advantage. For each mastery one has over the opposition, they can improve ('bump up') the result of their die roll by one step. (e.g. A failure becomes a success, or a success becomes a critical).

If the side with the higher mastery reaches critical and still has masteries to spare, they use the extra masteries to reduce (or 'bump down') the opposition's result down by one step for each additional mastery.

==== Hero Points ====
Hero Points are awarded at the end of successful adventures. Hero Points can be used to improve ability levels, or can be held in reserve and used to bump contest results, as with Masteries. Masteries are applied automatically, Hero points are a conscious decision of the player.

The use of Hero Points to bump up results represents the ability of fictional heroes to summon up reserves not available to ordinary people, to turn a difficult situation in their favour.

== History ==
HeroQuest was first announced by Chaosium in 1980 in the RuneQuest second edition rule book as "an FRP wherein the mighty of Glorantha may enter into the lands of legend and myth, penetrating the immortal stories to participate in the Gods War, fight against chaos in the Great Darkness, or aid in the trials of the Lightbringers or the Protectors. A revolutionary approach to myth, magic, and role-playing. By the Chaosium".

When Stafford learned that Robin Laws was a fan of the Glorantha setting, Stafford approached Laws to create a new game for the setting. By 1998, the RPG was under development using the name Glorantha: The Game, with Stafford playtesting it at Chaosium with staff and friends. In contrast to the original Glorantha-set game RuneQuest, this new game was a storytelling game, designed by one of the main proponents of those games.

By mid-year the new game had become known as Hero Wars. Stafford had wanted to name it HeroQuest after an in-universe term that had been part of Glorantha lore for 20 years, but the Milton Bradley Company had used it for an unrelated board game. Laws's new game was scheduled to be demonstrated to the public for first time in May 1998 at Glorantha-Con VII. At the last moment Stafford decided to create some t-shirts for the event, which would highlight the convention and the fact that it was the public unveiling of the new Gloranthan game. Shannon Appelcline recalls that he "was working at Chaosium at the time, and I was the one who ended up making those shirts which read 'Hero Wars: The Initiation'. A Hero Wars logo of some sort was needed, so I laid out the words in a simple font without paying much attention to it [...] When I laid the logo out for the t-shirt, I printed it in bright orange, figuring it would be very visible against the black shirt. [...] I never imagined that I was designing the logo that would be used, down to the bright orange color, on the Hero Wars books for years to come.".

Hero Wars became the first fully professional product released by Issaries, published as a novel-sized trade paperback. Eric Rowe of Wizard's Attic believed that Hero Wars would sell better in book stores if the line was published this way, so Issaries decided to use the format. However, Hero Wars never penetrated the mass market and the decision to publish as trade paperbacks resulted in a smaller format which constrained layout and kept the books looking very simplistic, and they also did not fit in well with most game store displays. Issaries published about a half-dozen Hero Wars books from 2000 to 2002. Most of the books – including Thunder Rebels (2000), Storm Tribe (2001), Barbarian Adventures (2001) and Orlanth is Dead! (2002) – focused on the Sartarites.

In 2003, when Issaries sold out of the core book, they decided to revise the Hero Wars rules in a new edition. The rulebook was reformatted at a more standard size, and, as the Milton Bradley trademark had lapsed, Stafford was able to publish the second edition of the game under the name he had originally wanted, HeroQuest.

A second edition of HeroQuest revised by original designer Laws, was published in 2009 under license by Moon Design Publications, as a mostly setting-free version. In 2013, Issaries sold the HeroQuest trademark to Moon Design, who in 2015 published HeroQuest Glorantha, integrating the game world more fully. The following year Moon Design merged with Chaosium which subsequently published two Glorantha based HeroQuest supplements in 2016 and 2017. 2020 marked big changes with the release of a free SRD of HeroQuest, titled QuestWorlds SRD, Moon Design selling the HeroQuest trademark to Hasbro, and rebranding the HeroQuest RPG to QuestWorlds.

== Reception ==
In his 2023 book Monsters, Aliens, and Holes in the Ground, RPG historian Stu Horvath noted, "Hero Wars marks a culmination of narrative-focused RPGs up to this point in time." However, Horvath pointed out the complexity of the supposedly simple narrative system, saying, "group conflicts that consist of a series of rolls can become dizzying. When the five types of magic are accounted for, the vertigo really hits ... Hero Wars shows the vast potential of narrative gaming, yes, but that freedom is all too often paralyzing."

== Reviews ==
- Backstab #47
- Coleção Dragão Brasil
- Realms of Fantasy

== Other games ==
Two other games licensed the HeroQuest system:

- Galeotti, Mark (2006). Mythic Russia : heroism and adventure in the land of the firebird. UK: Firebird Productions. ISBN 978-0955322402.
- Green, Charles (2010). Nameless Streets, a supernatural noir game. UK: Alephtar Games. ISBN 978-0857440105.

== See also ==
- Anaxial's Roster: Creatures of the Hero Wars
