= Different Worlds =

Tabletop role-playing game magazine

Different Worlds Magazine
- Editor: Tadashi Ehara
- Frequency: bimonthly
- Publisher: Chaosium (1979 - 1985); Sleuth Publications (1985 - 1987); Different Worlds Publications (1987)
- Founder: Tadashi Ehara, Greg Stafford
- Founded: 1979
- First issue: February/March 1979
- Final issue Number: Fall 1987; 47
- Country: United States
- Language: English
- Website: diffworlds.com

Different Worlds was an American role-playing games magazine published from 1979 to 1987.

== Scope ==
Different Worlds published support articles, scenarios, and variants for various role-playing games including Dungeons & Dragons, RuneQuest, Traveller, Call of Cthulhu, Journey to the Center of the Circle, and others; play techniques and strategies for players and gamemasters of role-playing games; reviews of games and miniatures; and reviews of current books and movies of interest to role-playing gamers.

Notably, Different Worlds also featured early works by artists Steve Oliff, Bill Willingham, and Steve Purcell; ″Sword of Hollywood″, a regular film review column by Larry DiTillio from issue seven onward; the irregular autobiographical/interview feature ″My Life and Roleplaying″; and the industry scuttlebutt column ″A Letter from Gigi″ by the pseudonymous Gigi D'Arn.

Different Worlds also published books, including:

- Tékumel Sourcebook: The World of the Petal Throne, book 1, 1987
- Tékumel Sourcebook: The World of the Petal Throne, book 2, 1988
- Blackwatch Technical Reference Manual, 1989

== Publication history ==
Different Worlds was launched in 1979 by Tadashi Ehara and Greg Stafford of Chaosium as a general-interest role-playing magazine. At that time Chaosium was primarily a board game publisher, but had also published its own role-playing game, RuneQuest, in 1978. RuneQuest was designed primarily to be played in Glorantha, Stafford's fantasy world and the setting of the board games White Bear and Red Moon (later Dragon Pass) and Nomad Gods.

Chaosium had previously published the magazine Wyrm's Footnotes, which ran for fourteen issues from 1976 to 1982. Wyrm's Footnotes was conceived primarily as support for White Bear and Red Moon and other Chaosium board games, but quickly became a forum for discussion of Glorantha, and was rebranded to be the official RuneQuest magazine with its 11th issue (Spring 1981).

Different Worlds was published bimonthly from 1979 to 1987, for 47 issues. Chaosium published the first thirty-eight issues from 1979 to 1985, and Sleuth Publications published the final nine issues between 1985 and 1987. Tadashi Ehara was the magazine's editor at both publishers.

== Reception ==
In Issue 49 of the British games magazine Perfidious Albion, Charles Vasey noted, "This magazine has done extremely well in demonstrating that a publisher can produce an independent magazine at the same time, and congratulations are due to Tadashi [Ehara] and Greg [Stafford]. The article quality can still be low, but it compares well with The Dragon." Two issues later, Vasey added the comment, "Reviews may be a little [too] kind, but [it is] the only zine to rival White Dwarf.

In Issue 15 of Abyss, Dave Nalle commented, "Different Worlds tries to cover the field, and it does a painfully conscientious job. The reasons are clear. It is fighting a pull towards being a house organ [for Chaosium] and it seems to be a very strong pull. DW is strong because it tries hard and attracts some excellent writers. At the same time it is weakened by the fact that several writers provide the majority of the material, and it is slanted towards Runequest." Nalle concluded, "In spite of weaknesses, I can see my way clear to recommending this magazine."

== Reviews ==
- Perfidious Albion #46 (May 1980) p.19
- Perfidious Albion #47 (August 1980) p.13
