= Tales of the Reaching Moon =

Fantasy role-playing magazine (1989–2002)

- Issue 20 cover by Dario Corallo
- Editor: David Hall
- Publisher: Reaching Moon Megacorp
- Founder: David Hall, Matthew Tudor, Brian Duguid
- Founded: 1989
- First issue: 1989; 37 years ago
- Final issue Number: 2002; 20
- Country: UK
- Language: English
- ISSN: 0960-1228

Tales of the Reaching Moon (also known as ToTRM) was a British fanzine dedicated to the fantasy world of Glorantha and producing material for fantasy role-playing games.

== Publication history ==
When UK fanzine Pavic Tales, the first notable Glorantha fanzine, ended after issue #9 (Spring 1989), Tales of the Reaching Moon (20 issues, 1989-2002) from British fan organization Reaching Moon Megacorp was the next major fanzine for Glorantha. Reaching Moon Megacorp closed by publishing Tales of the Reaching Moon #20 (2002).

The editor, David Hall, published 20 issues from 1989 to 2002 (2/yr until 1994, then annually). The magazine was originally published with a monochrome cover but had a full colour cover from issue 12 onwards. Most of the later issues had a central theme fleshed out through a variety of related articles by different authors. A list of issues with themes is given below:

- Tales of the Reaching Moon #1 (1989)
- Tales of the Reaching Moon #2 (1989)
- Tales of the Reaching Moon #3 (1990)
- Tales of the Reaching Moon #4 (1990) Australian Special!
- Tales of the Reaching Moon #5 (1991) Humakti Special!
- Tales of the Reaching Moon #6 (1991)
- Tales of the Reaching Moon #7 (1992) Hero Quest Special!
- Tales of the Reaching Moon #8 (1992) The Chaos Feature
- Tales of the Reaching Moon #9 (1993)
- Tales of the Reaching Moon #10 (1993) Sea Special
- Tales of the Reaching Moon #11 (1994) Pamaltela: Great Southern Land
- Tales of the Reaching Moon #12 (1994) Bumper Colour Special!
- Tales of the Reaching Moon #13 (1995) Go West!
- Tales of the Reaching Moon #14 (1996) Praxian Special
- Tales of the Reaching Moon #15 (1996) Prax Part Deux
- Tales of the Reaching Moon #16 (1997) Lunar Special
- Tales of the Reaching Moon #17 (1998) Catch-up Special
- Tales of the Reaching Moon #18 (1999) Sartar Special
- Tales of the Reaching Moon #19 (2000) Upland Marsh Special
- Tales of the Reaching Moon #20 (2002) Farewell Issue!

The fanzine printed gaming material for a variety of rule-systems, including RuneQuest and King Arthur Pendragon. In addition to this it also had fiction, news and a Rumours section based on the format of the RuneQuest supplements.

== Reception ==
Allen Varney reviewed the Winter '93 issue of Tales of the Reaching Moon, and said that "For casual players, Tales of the Reaching Moon might as well be printed in Sanskrit, as evidenced by cryptic references [...] But if that's music to your ears, consider taking an issue on your next trip to Glorantha."

== Reviews ==
- Australian Realms #26
