= Moon Design Publications =

Tabletop role-playing game publisher

Moon Design Publications are publishers of tabletop role-playing game books set in Greg Stafford's world of Glorantha. They were founded in 1998 by Rick Meints and Colin Phillips in the UK.

== History ==
Rick Meints was an American expatriate in the 1990s who joined the British fan publisher Reaching Moon Megacorp, which was "the center of Glorantha culture at the time" according to Shannon Appelcline. Meints wrote a book about collecting publications related to Glorantha, The Meints Index to Glorantha (1996, 1999), which was published by the Reaching Moon Megacorp, although by the time the second edition of that book was published the members of the Megacorp were leaving after a decade of continuous publication and organizing conventions. Meints and Colin Phillips founded Moon Design Publications in 1998, which reprinted supplements for RuneQuest that were no longer in print.

Moon Design released four compilations of previously published RuneQuest material over six years using the "Gloranthan Classics" label, starting with Pavis & Big Rubble (1999) and finishing with Borderlands & Beyond (2005). Once Borderlands was released and Moon Design had finished with the major books on Glorantha that Chaosium had published, Greg Stafford had returned from spending a year in Mexico and chose Moon Design to continue the publications of Issaries.

Moon Design managed to rather quickly publish its first release Imperial Lunar Handbook Volume 2 (2006). They only published two more books for HeroQuest by 2008, along with some "unfinished works" by Greg Stafford that Moon Design classified as the Stafford Library.

Jeff Richard joined Moon Design in 2008 as both co-owner and main author for Glorantha books. Moon Design then released a second edition of HeroQuest (2009), which author Robin Laws revised from the first edition. Moon Design also published Sartar: Kingdom of Heroes (2009) that same year to expand the Sartarite background in Hero Wars to make the game setting more comprehensive, along with Book of Heortling Mythology (2009) by Stafford and the Sartar Companion (2010).

== Publications ==
Glorantha Classics
Glorantha Classics Volume 1, Pavis & Big Rubble. Moon Design Publications. 1999. ISBN 978-0-9777853-5-3.
Glorantha Classics Volume 2, Griffin Mountain. Moon Design Publications. 2001.
Glorantha Classics Volume 3, Cult Compendium. Moon Design Publications. 2002.
Glorantha Classics Volume 4, Borderlands & Beyond. Moon Design Publications. 2005.
