= Issaries, Inc. =

Role-playing game company

- Industry: Publishing
- Founded: 1997; 29 years ago in California, US
- Defunct: 2013
- Headquarters: US
- Owner: Greg Stafford
- Website: web.archive.org/web/20120131152320/http://www.issaries.com/

Issaries, Inc. was a game publisher incorporated in California in 1999 by Greg Stafford to control and manage products using Stafford's fictional world of Glorantha. It partnered with Moon Design Publications to develop the flagship roleplaying game Hero Wars. In 2003, it acquired the HeroQuest and RuneQuest trademarks from Hasbro, which led to the licensing of a new edition of RuneQuest. The company's last statement was in 2013 and is now listed as Dissolved.

== History ==
Greg Stafford founded Issaries as a company to hold on to the trademarks and copyrights for Glorantha after obtaining them from Chaosium. To deal with funding difficulties, Chaosium issued a press release in August 1997 to offer shares of Issaries for $100 each, planning to start the company after raising $50,000 so that a new Glorantha-based RPG could be produced. Stafford approached Robin Laws to design the new game, which became known as Hero Wars, and was the first release published by Issaries in 2000. The original run of Hero Wars sold out in 2003, so Stafford published the second edition of his game again based in Glorantha as HeroQuest and Issaries published several supplements for the game. Stafford moved to Mexico in 2004, at which point Issaries stopped publishing RPGs, and when he came back to the US in 2005 he used Issaries to license the Glorantha rights to other companies such as Mongoose Publishing and Moon Design Publications.
