= White Bear and Red Moon =

Fantasy tabletop wargame

- 1977 second printing cover by Steve Swenston
- Other names: Dragon Pass
- Designers: Greg Stafford
- Publishers: Chaosium, Avalon Hill
- Publication: 1975, 1981, 1983
- Genres: Board wargame, fantasy
- Players: 1-3
- Playing time: 90-120 minutes

White Bear and Red Moon is a fantasy board wargame set in the world of Glorantha, created by Greg Stafford and published in 1975. Stafford first tried to sell the game to established publishers, but despite being accepted by three different game companies, each attempt ended in failure; eventually he founded his own game company in 1974, the influential Chaosium, to produce and market the game.

The game depicts the wars between the mighty Lunar Empire and the barbarian nation of Sartar, led by Prince Argrath, with many smaller countries and individuals available as allies to either side. Like other games of the board wargame genre, it has a hex map, many cardstock unit counters, and a number of rules themes.

White Bear and Red Moon went through three printings with minor differences. It was substantially revised and republished in 1981 under the name Dragon Pass, first by Chaosium and then in a nearly identical reprint from the Avalon Hill Game Company in 1983. The main differences in the reprint are a few streamlined rules and a notable improvement in the quality of the components. In particular, the paper map was replaced by a full-color game board. All editions are now out of print, and moderately valuable to a collector. A French-language edition was published by Oriflam under license from Chaosium under the name La Guerre des Héros in 1993. A Japanese-language edition was published by Hobby Japan.

Nomad Gods is another Chaosium board game that shares many rules in common, is set in a neighboring region of Glorantha, and can be regarded as a sequel of sorts. A planned third game in the series was never produced.

== Components ==
Dragon Pass, 1983 Avalon Hill edition

The game components for the Dragon Pass version of this game include the box, a fold-out board map of the battle area, the rulebook, two sheets of die-cut cardboard counters, a player aid card, and a die. The game board is 22" × 31" and printed in color. The map is overlaid by a hex grid to regularize movement. At one end of the board is a turn track and several holding boxes for magical spirits and agents.

The map includes a variety of different terrain types, including forest, marsh, hills, mountains, fortresses, stockades, ridges, cities, ruins, and lakes. Each type of terrain has different effects on movement and combat. There are also roads, rivers, and fords that can alter the movement. The map is also divided up into several territories, including a number of independent nations.

This game features a great variety of unit types and nations, forming a colorful array of unit counters with a somewhat complex system of ratings and symbols. Some units represent troops, while others are individual heroes, spirits, or agents.

== Gameplay ==
An unlimited number of units can be grouped together in the same hex to form a stack. Depending on the components of the stack and how it is ordered, most stacks exert a zone of control into the surrounding hexes. Units must cease movement upon entering an enemy zone of control, and a unit can not move directly from one enemy zone of control to another. Stacks that are currently disembodied do not exert a zone of control.

Each active player's turn consists of the following phases:

- Move those units that are subject to random movement.
- Attempt to gain allies.
- Move any friendly units, and add replacements and reinforcements.
- Use any exotic abilities (such as magic).
- Resolve combat.
- Rally units that are disrupted.

Resolution of combat can include various types of magic, the use of missile fire, and finally melee combat. The combat results are in the form of Combat Factor losses, which is one of the ratings on the counters.

As is typical of many wargames, every friendly unit that is adjacent to an opposing unit must attack an adjacent opposing unit. Also each opposing unit adjacent to a friendly unit must be attacked. The exception to this is a unit inside a fortification, which is not forced to attack.

This game includes a considerable amount of chrome, simulating the variety of heroes, creatures, and magic that were involved in the battles. This can be an appealing factor to those who enjoy games with a fantasy atmosphere. Heroes and superheroes can have a powerful impact on the outcome of the various battles. The extra details can add complexity to what would otherwise be a relatively simple board wargame.

== Reception ==
In Issue 14 of Perfidious Albion, Bob Latter found "the physical value for the money must be exceptional, the graphics and components are excellent, the game is beautiful and imaginative, and any fan of Tolkien, Arthur or Conan and suchlike should not hesitate to rush to buy this." Four years later, Charles Vasey reviewed the edition titled Dragon Pass and commented, "it is a jolly little system with lots of elements of tactical warfare in it, provided you can accept that the armies should manoeuvre in true World War I style with long lines and fronts." Where Vasey felt this game fell down was its scenarios, writing, "Its scenarios are, almost without exception, badly designed and overlong with victory conditions of the worst kind." Vasey concluded, "This failing is not, however, fatal, and on balance I feel the game's splendours exceed its failures, but Greg [designer Greg Stafford] — do get some new scenarios." The following issue, Geoffrey Barnard weighed in about the Dragon Pass edition, saying, "it's still long, rather tedious and very colourful and atmospheric. In short it exposes a classic problem, whether its advantages outweigh its disadvantages - such is up to you to decide." Barnard's main issue with the game was that mass combat was not medieval in structure or intent. Barnard also called the scenarios "really very weak especially in the three-player game where one must control two capitals (one of which should be your own). All three sides sit and look at their opponents who in turn return their stares. Such equilibrium is no encouragement to go to war, whoever moves first risks the others attacking him." Barnard concluded, "Given these problems Dragon Pass is not a game I would play ... The game is still worthy of applause for its construction as a fantasy world, in which field it remains the unrivalled leader."

Sumner N. Clarren reviewed White Bear and Red Moon in The Space Gamer No. 5. Clarren commented that "The game has been crafted with great skill and wit, rare in games today."

In his 1977 book The Comprehensive Guide to Board Wargaming, Nicholas Palmer noted the game had "Eight scenarios of increasing complexity; the total effect is highly complicated." Palmer also warned that the game required a large amount of luck, but also involved "absorbing diplomatic possibilities of played with a number of participants."

Neil Shapiro reviewed White Bear and Red Moon in The Space Gamer No. 13. Shapiro commented that "White Bear and Red Moon is much better than just fantastic [...] It is a sub-creation as real as all mythology."

Greg Costikyan reviewed White Bear & Red Moon in Ares Magazine #1, rating it an 8 out of 9. Costikyan commented that "White Bear & Red Moon is less a game than a description of an entire culture. In a short rulebook, it provides an insight into the religions, governments, and ideologies of whole peoples; descriptions of weird and imaginative alien races; the rationales for several competing kinds of magic; and the biographies of the greatest heroes of the age. Further, despite its occasional awkwardnesses, White Bear & Red Moon is an enjoyable and fast-playing game."

Forrest Johnson reviewed the 1980 revised edition, Dragon Pass, in The Space Gamer No. 40. Johnson commented that "The rules for Dragon Pass are no cleaner than those for White Bear and Red Moon. After all this time, Chaosium should know better than to publish a game which has not been blindtested."

Steve List reviewed Dragon Pass in Ares Magazine #14 and commented that "While in some ways it is less 'magical' than its predecessor, it is a better product in general and can be appreciated by the average gamer and dedicated fantasy fan alike. Try it; you'll like it."

== Reviews ==
- Dragon Pass in Isaac Asimov's Science Fiction Magazine v11 n6 (1987 06)
- Games & Puzzles #61
