= Glorantha =

Fantasy world created by Greg Stafford

- RuneQuest and HeroQuest location
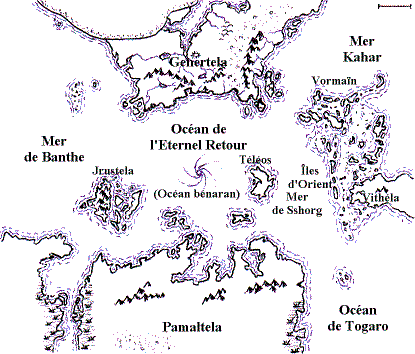
- Map of Glorantha by Christophe Dang Ngoc Chan
- Created by: Greg Stafford
- Genre: Tabletop role-playing game, wargame, fiction, Video games

In-universe information
- Type: Fantasy world
- Locations: Genertela, Pamaltela

Glorantha is a fantasy world created by Greg Stafford.

== Overview ==
Glorantha was first introduced in the board game White Bear and Red Moon (1975) by Chaosium, and then in a number of other board, roleplaying and computer games, including RuneQuest and HeroQuest. It was also used in several works of fiction and the computer strategy games King of Dragon Pass, its successor Six Ages: Ride Like the Wind and sequel Six Ages 2: Lights Going Out. The Gloranthan world is characterised by its complex use of mythology, heavily influenced by the universalist approaches of Joseph Campbell and Mircea Eliade, its sword and sorcery ethos, its long and distinctive history as a setting for role-playing games, its community development and expansion, and its relative lack of Tolkienesque influence, which is uncommon among early American fantasy role-playing games.

Stafford first wrote about in Glorantha in 1966 as a way to deepen his own understanding of mythology. He founded the company Chaosium to publish the board wargame White Bear and Red Moon in 1975, which was set in Glorantha. Chaosium later published other games in the setting, including the critically acclaimed RuneQuest. Various later editions of RuneQuest, the narrative role-playing game HeroQuest (the first edition of which was published as Hero Wars), and the video game King of Dragon Pass were also set in Glorantha, as were several prominent fan efforts. Stafford has also explored the Gloranthan setting in the fantasy novel King of Sartar and a number of unfinished works published under the collective name of "the Stafford Library".

In Glorantha, magic operates from the everyday level of prayers and charms to the creation and maintenance of the world. Heroes make their way in the world, and may also venture into metaphysical realms to gain knowledge and power, at the risk of body and soul. In the more recent material, competing magical outlooks (such as theism, shamanism and mysticism) exist to explain the world. Within each metaphysical system, adherents may also compete, such as when theistic worshipers of rival gods battle each other. The world is flat, with a dome-like sky, and it has been shaped in large and small ways by the mythic actions of the gods. The 'historical' world of Glorantha is in a more or less fallen state, having recovered only partially from a universal battle against Chaos in the mythic Godtime.

Humans are the dominant race, but other sentient beings abound. Some, such as the mystic dragonewts, are unique to Glorantha. Familiar nonhuman races, such as elves and dwarves, are distinct from their common, Tolkienesque portrayals.

== History of the Gloranthan game world ==
=== Early development (1960s–1970s) ===
Glorantha's origins lie in experiments with mythology, storytelling, recreation, and the blending of ancient societies. It is unlike its contemporary, Dungeons & Dragons which has its roots in wargaming.

Stafford's first imaginings of Glorantha date back to 1966, when he began his studies at Beloit College, as a vehicle for him to deepen his own understanding of mythology by creating his own mythology. Stafford was greatly influenced by the ideas on the mythology of Joseph Campbell, and echoes of Campbell's work are to be found in many aspects of Glorantha; for instance, the story of the "God Learners" can be seen as an exercise on the implications of Campbell's idea of a unifying monomyth, and the story of Prince Argrath an exploration of Campbell's The Hero with a Thousand Faces (1949). More abstractly, Campbell's idea that myths are how we shape our lives deeply informs the picture of life in Glorantha throughout the game world's publication history.

The first game set in Glorantha was the board game White Bear and Red Moon. The game details a time of constant war between the land of Sartar and the Lunar Empire during the reign of Argrath Dragontooth. Its board details an area called Dragon Pass, while the rulebook provides details of the warring factions, their lands, and leaders. In addition, it provides a large-scale map titled the Greater Lunar Empire, showing a larger world in which Dragon Pass is placed. The White Bear and Red Moon does not disclose the name of the world.

Nomad Gods, a second board game, published by Chaosium in 1978, and based on the raids and wars between the beast-riding, spirit-worshiping tribes of Prax, a cursed land located east of Dragon Pass. It also did not mention the world by name.

In 1978, after the publication of Nomad Gods, and prior to the publication of RuneQuest, the name Glorantha appeared in print for the first time. Wyrm's Footnotes #4 contained three articles on Glorantha and a map of the world itself.

=== In role-playing games (late 1970s – 1990s) ===
The first edition of the role-playing game RuneQuest was released in 1978. Here, the world was referred to as "Glorontha". Several later editions were made; the second edition ("RuneQuest 2") in 1979 introduced many sophisticated game aids, such as Cults of Prax and Cults of Terror, and polished campaign packs such as Griffin Mountain. Using materials such as Cults of Prax, players aligned their characters with any of a number of religions, grounding those characters in the political, cultural, and metaphysical conflicts of the setting. Each religion offered a distinct worldview and cultural outlook, none of which was considered objectively correct out-of-character. This approach of offering competing mythical histories and value systems continues in current Glorantha material. Cults of Terror focused on the worship of evil gods and adversaries, such as Vivamort, a vampire cult, and Lunar and Chaos cults.

In 1993, Stafford published his first major expansion of Gloranthan mythology, the novel King of Sartar. This was a departure from previous Gloranthan material, which had all been targeted at a tabletop role-playing game audience.

In an attempt to leverage the power of a much bigger gaming company, a third edition of RuneQuest, was published with Avalon Hill in 1984. The default setting for this edition was given as the "Dark Ages of fantasy Europe", but it also included a booklet allowing use in Glorantha. Later supplements such as Gods of Glorantha expanded religious aspects, while Glorantha: Genertela, Crucible of the Hero Wars did the same for culture and geography.

In the mid-1990s, Avalon Hill began work on a fourth edition of RuneQuest, subtitled Adventures in Glorantha. Stafford did not approve of the project and it was canceled. RuneQuest did not prosper by its association with Avalon Hill, and the relationship between Chaosium, who held the rights to Glorantha, and Avalon Hill, who held the rights to RuneQuest, broke down completely in 1995. Following the break with Chaosium, Avalon Hill began to assert their trademark to the RuneQuest name, began work on RuneQuest: Slayers. This was unrelated to Glorantha and the third edition rules. The project was canceled just before printing in 1998.

During this period of breakdown, Glorantha continued to evolve. The advent of the Internet caused a boom in fan creations for Glorantha. This was supported by several unofficial business ventures, such as Reaching Moon Megacorp, and a lively convention scene. Loren Miller proposed his Maximum Game Fun principle as a basis for gaming in Glorantha; this soon became a game system in its own right. David Dunham proposed his PenDragon Pass system, a nearly freeform game system, and several ambitious freeform games were played at conventions. One such game, Home of the Bold, hosted up to eighty participants.

The video game King of Dragon Pass was released by A Sharp in 1999. The player assumes the role of an Orlanthi hero who seeks to unite the clans and tribes of Dragon Pass into a single kingdom. The game features exceptional depth of coverage of the area of Dragon Pass, and featured the first compelling public view of Stafford's ideas about the hero's quest. Stafford was also self publishing additional material at this time about the history and mythology of Glorantha in non-game form in The Glorious (Re)Ascent of Yelm.

=== 21st century ===
In 2000, Issaries, Inc. published Hero Wars, a new Gloranthan role-playing game unrelated to RuneQuest. Its next iteration in 2003 was named HeroQuest and later in 2008, Moon Design Publications published an updated second edition. 2016 saw Moon Design publish HeroQuest Glorantha, completely integrating Glorantha into the rules. 2006 saw RuneQuest licensed from Issaries by Mongoose Publishing with a second edition in 2010. In 2012, The Design Mechanism published the sixth edition of RuneQuest, with no Gloranthan content. Glorantha returned in 2018 with Chaosium publishing RuneQuest - Roleplaying in Glorantha.

==== Hero Wars and HeroQuest ====
The HeroQuest game system, written by Robin Laws in collaboration with Greg Stafford, is a complete departure from RuneQuest. The former leverages quick contests and open, almost free-form style of skills and abilities to emulate a mythic structure of play, with rising and falling tensions that contrast with the more naturalistic focus taken by RuneQuest. Owing to this approach, some RuneQuest fans found it difficult to adjust to HeroQuest. A rewritten second edition was published in Spring 2009 by Moon Design Publications. It was supported with comprehensive Gloranthan sourcebooks Sartar: Kingdom of Heroes (2009), Sartar Companion (2010) and Pavis: Gateway to Adventure (2012).

==== RuneQuest ====
In 2006, RuneQuest was licensed to Mongoose Publishing by Issaries. Their new edition of the rules, were not set in Glorantha, and required a further supplemement, Glorantha – The Second Age to play. Written by Robin Laws, it was set in the Second Age of Gloratha's history against the backdrop of The God Learner empire and the Empire of Wyrm's Friends. In this edition, Mongoose produced 17 supplements and adventures based in Glorantha, alongside their generic fantasy background.

A second edition Mongoose RuneQuest II was published in January 2010, but Mongoose Publishing's licence for Gloranthan material lapsed in May 2011. The RuneQuest II game system has been retitled "Legend", and contains no Gloranthan material. A new company, The Design Mechanism, was formed by the authors of RuneQuest II, and ownership of the Gloranthan supplements produced for the "RuneQuest II" line was transferred to them (PDF versions continued to be sold). There are close links between The Design Mechanism and Moon Design Publications, with The Design Mechanism founders writing material for both companies. Their new edition of the RuneQuest rules, RuneQuest: Sixth Edition, did not have a Gloranthan setting.

In 2018 Chaosium published RuneQuest - Roleplaying in Glorantha. Wholly set in Glorantha, it advanced the in-game date to 1625, and focuses once again on Dragon Pass. Along with its two slipcase companions, it provides a complete overview of this region. Again the village of Apple Lane in the homeland of Sartar is used as a starting adventure setting, but updated to the year 1625. Two further supplements concentrate on specific areas within Dragon Pass.

== The World of Glorantha ==
The Glorantha website introduces Glorantha as follows:

Glorantha is an action-packed world of adventure. Gods and Goddesses struggle here, with nations of people nothing but their pawns. The stormy barbarians with their brutal but honest Storm God struggle against the Lunar Empire, led by the imperial Sun God and devious Moon Goddess.

Glorantha is an exciting world of heroes. Legends are being made by great individuals, many who are not even human beings. Some work with the deities, other heroes and heroines fight against them.

Glorantha is colorful and full of magic. Supernatural animals are found, ranging from unicorns to seven types of merfolk and the Goddess of Lions.

Glorantha is immense. If explored, it has different worlds and dimensions, whole realms where Gods, spirits and sorcerous powers come from. Unlike many fantasy settings, Glorantha emphasises religion, myth and belief to a level rarely seen in role-playing or fantasy fiction elsewhere.

Glorantha shares some fantasy tropes such as dwarves, elves, trolls, giants, but has developed them differently to the more conventional versions based on the work of Tolkien. Dwarves are literally made of stone and exist as manifest rigid inflexible laws of creation, while elves are intelligent, mobile plants. Glorantha is full of surprises.

Glorantha is as deep as you want it to be, or not. Hackers and choppers have what they want, while scholars and mythologists have a vast playground of new stories, legends and myths to enjoy.

It has various cultures analogous to Earth spread over two major landmasses and a wide archipelago. The northern continent of Genertela has a caste society of roughly Vedic type to the west, an autocratic Oriental society to the east and a classical-style Bronze Age culture in the center. The southern continent of Pamaltela is analogous to Africa.

== Creatures of Glorantha ==
Broos are creatures of chaos. As they can successfully mate with anything, they have the body of a man and features of their animal parent, often deer, goats, antelope, cattle, and sheep. The animal parent normally dies when the child eats its way out of the host at full gestation. They worship Malia, the Mother of Disease, and Thed, the goddess of rape and mother of Chaos.

Scorpionmen are belligerent and resemble scorpion-human centaur. They are stupid, vicious and live in violent matriarchies with a religious emphasis on devouring. They are chaotic in nature.

Ducks or Durulz are flightless humanoid duck-like creatures who have arms rather than wings (or men cursed with feathers and webbed feet). They have unknown ancestry and may descend from cursed humans or cursed ducks. They reside around rivers, mainly in Sartar, and have an unexplained mystical affinity with Death.

Aldryami or Gloranthan elves, are plant people. They worship nature and the sun and Aldrya, deity of plants, specifically. In contrast to Tolkienesque elves, they are alien, physically plant-like and unfriendly to "meat men" (humans). Like many other fantasy fictional elf races, they are excellent archers.

Mostali are machine-like dwarves. They are xenophobic, orthodox and insular. They have invented iron, which has many extraordinary magical properties in Glorantha, contrasting to the primary metal used, bronze.

Uz, the trolls, are the race of darkness; large, intelligent, astoundingly omnivorous, with a very developed sonar-like sense (darksense). Their societies are matriarchal, and they worship, among others, a goddess of darkness called Kyger Litor, mother of the Trolls, and the more violent and sinister Zorak Zoran.

Dragonewts are a magical race made up of forms of neotenic dragons. They are engaged in a cycle of self-improving reincarnation. They are alien, with an incomprehensible mindset. They must have oral surgery in order to speak human languages.

== Multimedia Glorantha ==
Glorantha has been the background for a number of different media, and numerous pieces of myth and fiction created by the Glorantha community, featured in magazines such as Tales of the Reaching Moon. Several hundred gaming miniatures by various licensees and about a dozen plush toys have also been produced at various times.

=== Board games ===
- White Bear and Red Moon/Dragon Pass
- Nomad Gods
- Khan of Khans
- Glorantha: The Gods War

=== Tabletop role-playing games ===
- RuneQuest
- HeroQuest
- 13th Age Glorantha

=== Video games ===
- King of Dragon Pass by A Sharp
- Six Ages: Ride Like The Wind by A Sharp
- Six Ages 2: Lights Going Out by A Sharp
- Runequest: Warlords by Virtuos

=== Prose fiction and comics ===
- King of Sartar by Greg Stafford
- The Collected/Complete Griselda by Oliver Dickinson
- Gloranthan Visions by various authors
- The Widow's Tale and Eurhol's Vale and Other Tales by Penelope Love
- Path of the Damned, a comic book series

=== Fanzines ===
- Tales of the Reaching Moon
- Hearts in Glorantha
