= Greg Stafford (game designer) =

American game designer (1948–2018)

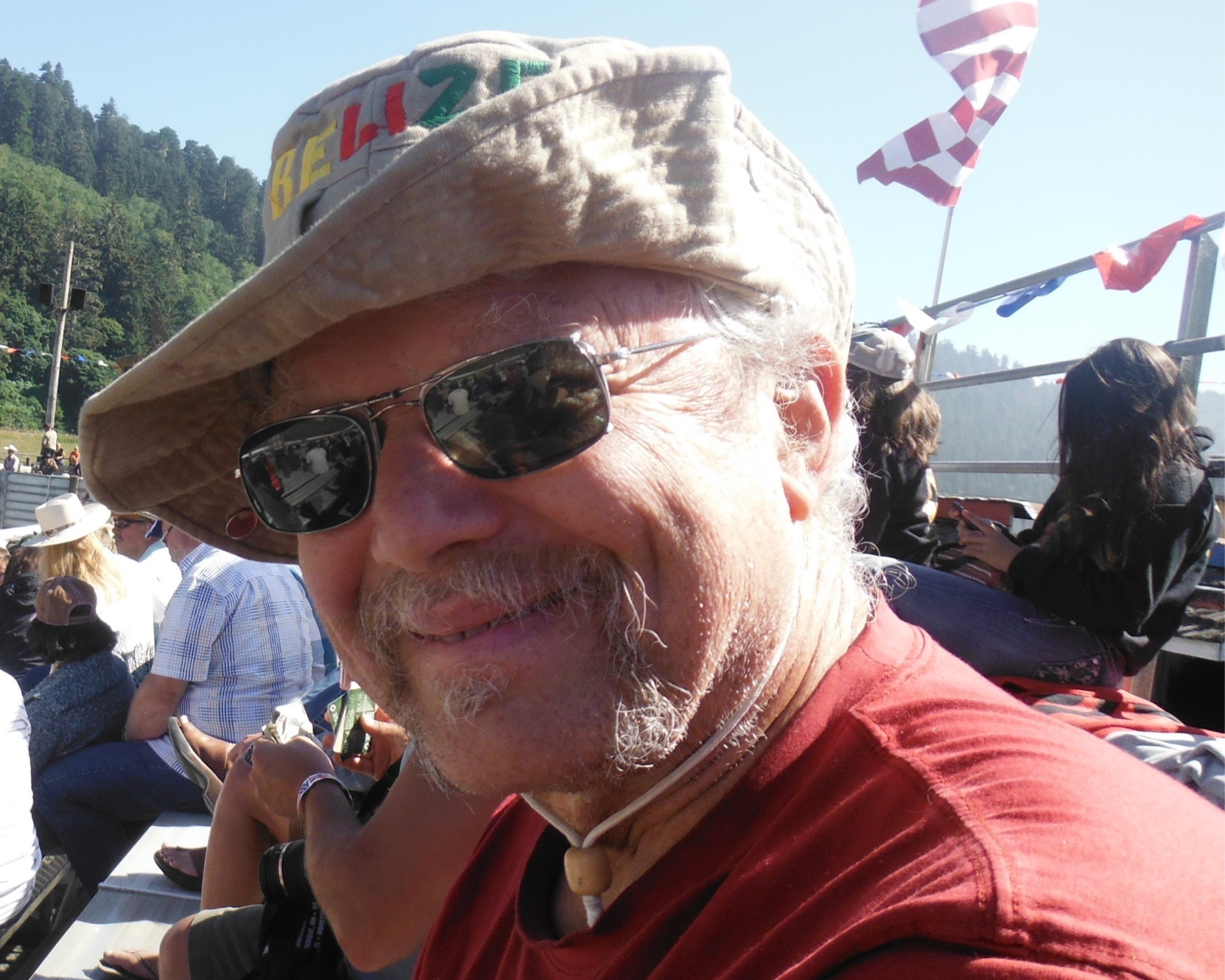
- Stafford, July 2013 in Orick, California
- Born: Francis Gregory Stafford; February 9, 1948; Waterbury, Connecticut, U.S.
- Died: October 10, 2018 (aged 70); Arcata, California, U.S.
- Occupation: Game designer

Francis Gregory Stafford (February 9, 1948 – October 10, 2018) was an American game designer and publisher.

Stafford created the fantasy world of Glorantha. He was designer of Pendragon, he was co-designer of the RuneQuest, Ghostbusters, Prince Valiant and HeroQuest role-playing systems, founder of the role-playing game companies Chaosium and Issaries, designer of the White Bear and Red Moon, Nomad Gods, King Arthur's Knights and Elric board games, and co-designer of the King of Dragon Pass computer game.

== Gaming industry career ==
=== 1970s: Chaosium ===
Greg Stafford began wargaming with U-Boat by Avalon Hill, and in 1966 as a freshman at Beloit College he began to create the fantasy world of Glorantha. After rejection from a publisher, Stafford created White Bear and Red Moon set in Glorantha, and after three different companies were unable to publish the game, he founded Chaosium. He took part of the name from his home, being near the Oakland Coliseum, and the other part of the name from "chaos."

White Bear and Red Moon (1975) became the first game published by Chaosium, and was also Stafford's first professional game. He designed the board game Nomad Gods. He also designed the wargames Elric (1977) and King Arthur's Knights (1978).

Stafford wanted the world of Glorantha to be part of an original role-playing game; this ultimately resulted in RuneQuest (1978) by Steve Perrin, which was set in Glorantha.

Stafford and Lynn Willis simplified the RuneQuest rules into the 16-page Basic Role-Playing (1980). He designed the miniatures game Merlin. Stafford considered his Arthurian chivalric role-playing game King Arthur Pendragon (1985) his masterpiece. He co-designed the Ghostbusters role-playing game (1986).

Stafford designed the Prince Valiant roleplaying game (1989), which featured a basis in storytelling along with other innovations. He decided to produce a fiction line for Call of Cthulhu after he realized that many Lovecraft fans in the early 1990s had never actually read any fiction by Lovecraft but were only familiar with him through the Call of Cthulhu game. Stafford co-designed the computer game King of Dragon Pass (1999).

=== 1998–2000s: Issaries ===
Stafford left Chaosium in 1998, taking all of the rights for Glorantha, and founded the game company Issaries.

Stafford asked Robin Laws to design a new role-playing game based on Glorantha, which became known as Hero Wars, published in 2000 as the first fully professional product for Issaries. Stafford published the second edition of Hero Wars in 2003 using the name he preferred HeroQuest, as Milton Bradley allowed the trademark on the name to lapse. Stafford moved to Mexico in 2004, so production from Issaries ended at that time.

=== Later years ===
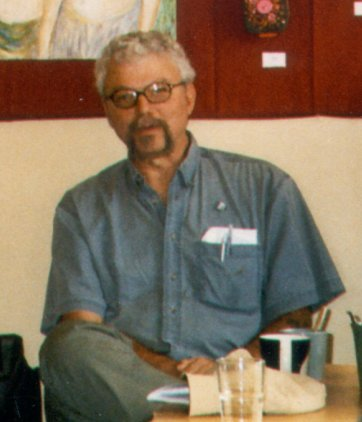
Greg Stafford in Helsinki, Finland on July 21, 2005

Hasbro let the RuneQuest trademark lapse, so Stafford picked up the rights to the game and licensed it to Mongoose Publishing to release a new edition in 2006. White Wolf obtained the rights to Pendragon, and published its fifth edition in 2005, while their ArtHaus imprint released The Great Pendragon Campaign (2006), in which Stafford laid out the huge role-playing campaign taking place between the years 485 to 566. Nocturnal Games then picked up the rights to Pendragon, and Stafford worked with them to produce a 5.1 edition of Pendragon (2010).

He moved from Berkeley, California, to Arcata, California, in 2007, having lived in the San Francisco Bay Area for some years.

In June 2015, Stafford and Sandy Petersen returned to Chaosium Inc., with Stafford taking the positions of President and CEO.

Stafford died at his home in Arcata on October 10, 2018, at the age of 70.

== Glorantha ==
Greg Stafford's interest in roleplaying and gaming originated in his adolescent fascination with mythology. During his adolescent years he read anything he could find on the subject, and when he exhausted the libraries, he started to write his own stories in his freshman year at Beloit College, in 1966. This was the start of the world of Glorantha.

Stafford's 1974 board game White Bear and Red Moon had featured the violent struggle between several cultures in the Dragon Pass region of Glorantha. The heart of the game was a conflict between the barbarian Kingdom of Sartar and the invading Lunar Empire, a theme which has remained central to Gloranthan publications since then.

As Stafford was founding his company Chaosium, the game Dungeons & Dragons (and the concept of tabletop role-playing games) was gaining great popularity. Role-players were keen to use the White Bear and Red Moon setting in such games. So Chaosium published RuneQuest, written by "Steve Perrin, Ray Turney, and Friends". Stafford left Chaosium in 1998.

For some years, Stafford slowly wrote several novels set in Glorantha. Novels that he is known to have been working on are Harmast's Saga, Arkat's Saga, and his "Lunar novel".

He was one of the designers on the Glorantha-based video game King of Dragon Pass.

== Shamanism-related works ==
Stafford was a practicing shaman and member of the board of directors of Shaman's Drum, a journal of experiential shamanism. He had some short articles of Arthurian interest published. Stafford lived in Mexico for 18 months, tutoring English as a foreign language, and exploring places of archeological and shamanic interest.

== Honors and reception ==
Fantasy author David A. Hargrave pays homage to Stafford in the Arduin series of supplements, the most widely known example of this being the Stafford's Star Bridge 9th-Level mage spell (Arduin I, page 41).

Stafford was inducted in the Origins Award hall of fame in 1987.

In 1999 Pyramid magazine named Greg Stafford one of The Millennium's Most Influential Persons, "at least in the realm of adventure gaming."

Stafford won the Diana Jones Award in 2007, for The Great Pendragon Campaign, published by White Wolf and in 2015 for Guide to Glorantha, coauthored with Jeff Richard and Sandy Petersen and published by Moon Design Publications

He was honored as a "famous game designer" by being featured as the king of hearts in Flying Buffalo's 2011 Famous Game Designers Playing Card Deck.
