= Chaosium =

Game publisher

Chaosium Inc.
- Founded: 1975; 51 years ago
- Founder: Greg Stafford
- Country of origin: United States
- Headquarters location: Ann Arbor, Michigan
- Key people: Greg Stafford; Sandy Petersen; Rick Meints; Jeff Richard; Neil Robinson; Michael O'Brien
- Publication types: Games, Books
- Fiction genres: Role-playing games, Board games, Fantasy fiction, Horror fiction, Weird fiction
- No. of employees: 16
- Official website: chaosium.com

Chaosium Inc. (/keɪˈɒsiəm/ kay-OSS-ee-əm) is a publisher of tabletop role-playing games established by Greg Stafford in 1975. Chaosium's major product lines include RuneQuest, set in Stafford's fictional world of Glorantha; Call of Cthulhu, based on the horror fiction stories of H. P. Lovecraft; Pendragon, based on Thomas Mallory's Le Morte d'Arthur; and 7th Sea, "swashbuckling and sorcery" set in a fantasy 17th-century Europe.

Many of Chaosium's product lines are based upon literary sources. Other notable game designers have written for Chaosium. These include David Conyers, Matthew Costello, Larry DiTillio, David A. Hargrave, Rob Heinsoo, Keith Herber, Jennell Jaquays, Katharine Kerr, Reiner Knizia, Charlie Krank, Robin Laws, Steve Perrin, Sandy Petersen, Ken Rolston, Ken St. Andre, Jonathan Tweet, John Wick, and Lynn Willis; among others.

== History ==
=== 1975–1980 ===
Greg Stafford founded "The Chaosium" in 1975, deriving the name partly from his apartment (which he described as a house of chaos), which was near the Oakland Coliseum, combining "coliseum" with "chaos". His purpose was to publish his first fantasy war game White Bear and Red Moon (later renamed Dragon Pass), a board game set in his fantasy world of Glorantha.

In 1978, Chaosium published Steve Perrin's roleplaying game RuneQuest, also set in Glorantha, following up with a second edition in 1980 and various supplements over the next six years.

In 1979, Chaosium entered the board wargame market with Reich, Raiders and Traders, and (in 1980) Panzer Pranks. Although all received positive reviews, none of the games found an audience.

=== 1980s: Growth and licensing with Avalon Hill ===
In 1980, the company officially incorporated as Chaosium Inc. That year, Stafford and Lynn Willis simplified the RuneQuest rules into the 16-page Basic Role-Playing (BRP). These simulationist, skill-based generic rules formed the basis of many of Chaosium's later "d100" RPGs, most notably Call of Cthulhu, first published in 1981.

Chaosium entered into a licensing agreement with Avalon Hill in 1983 to produce a third edition of RuneQuest. Avalon Hill manufactured and marketed the game, while Chaosium was responsible for acquisitions, design, development, and layout. Ken Rolston managed the line as "Rune Czar".

One of the first RPGs by a female lead designer was published by Chaosium: Kerie Campbell-Robson's 1986 release Hawkmoon. 1986 also saw the release of Ghostbusters with West End Games. Designed by Sandy Petersen, Lynn Willis, and Greg Stafford, it was the first RPG to use the dice pool mechanic. West End would also use the system as the basis of Star Wars: The Roleplaying Game and, eventually, the D6 System.

=== Late 1990s–early 2010s: Financial struggle ===
In 1996, it was prematurely reported that Chaosium had secured the rights to publish a collectible card game based on the video game Doom.

In 1998, following the financial failure of the collectible card game Mythos, Greg Stafford resigned as Chaosium president and left the company, along with Sandy Petersen (although they both remained shareholders). Chaosium effectively split up into various successor companies, each maintaining its focus on a few of the company's products. Stafford took the rights to his game setting Glorantha, setting up the company Issaries, Inc. to continue publishing this line (later licensing it to Moon Design Publications, along with the game HeroQuest).

Long-time employees and part-owners Charlie Krank and Lynn Willis remained at Chaosium as President and Editor-in-Chief respectively, continuing on with Call of Cthulhu as the main product line. Lynn Willis retired in 2008 due to poor health and died in 2013.

=== Mid 2010s: The return of Stafford and Petersen ===
Problems and delays fulfilling the Kickstarters for the 7th edition of Call of Cthulhu led Stafford and Petersen to return to active roles at Chaosium in June 2015. Charlie Krank subsequently left the company.

Later that year at Gen Con 2015, Stafford and Petersen announced Moon Design Publications were now part of the Chaosium ownership, and the four principals of Moon Design (Rick Meints, Jeff Richard, Michael O'Brien, and Neil Robinson) had become the new Chaosium management team. Chaosium once again became the licensed publisher for RuneQuest, HeroQuest, and other products related to Glorantha and continued to publish the Call of Cthulhu line. Stafford served as chair of the company board and creative consultant until his death in October 2018. Since retiring from the board in 2019, Petersen has done occasional freelance work for the company, as did original RuneQuest creator Steve Perrin until his death in 2021.

As part of its financial reorganization, the new management closed the company office and warehouse in Hayward, California, ending Chaosium's long association with the San Francisco Bay Area. The company is now based in Ann Arbor, Michigan and uses a fulfillment house model for distribution of product.

Delivery of the core rewards of the Call of Cthulhu 7th Edition Kickstarter finally commenced in April 2016. The new edition went on to win nine of the ten awards it was nominated for at the Gen Con 2017 ENnie Awards.

=== Late 2010s to present: Expansion ===
After the consolidation and reorganization of the mid-decade, the company was again poised to expand its offerings through a combination of acquisitions, new licenses, and distribution deals.

Greg Stafford's King Arthur Pendragon and Prince Valiant roleplaying games returned to Chaosium ownership on December 11, 2018.

On April 2, 2019, Chaosium acquired the rights to the 7th Sea product line (both Second Edition and Khitai Kickstarters) from John Wick, including back stock of books published so far.

On November 30, 2019, Chaosium acquired the rights to produce a role-playing game based on Ben Aaronovitch's Rivers of London urban fantasy novels.

In the spring of 2020, Chaosium took over distribution of the English translations of Spanish fantasy game Aquelarre and French Ice Age roleplaying game Würm, both of which had been successfully kickstarted by Nocturnal Media. In February 2021, they added Upwind, an original game kickstarted by Nocturnal Media and Biohazard Games, to that list.

On August 20, 2021, Chaosium acquired the rights to Cthulhu Britannica and World War Cthulhu, formerly produced under license by Cubicle 7 until 2017.

On October 26, 2021, Moon Design Publishing announced it was forming a partnership with Black Monk Games of Poland and a new company, The Chaosium Group, was being formed to manage both.

== Fiction ==
Chaosium began publishing a line of non-game books (primarily fiction) in 1993. Many titles are themed around H. P. Lovecraft's Cthulhu Mythos and related topics, although the first work published was Greg Stafford's fantasy work King of Sartar, set in his mythic world Glorantha.

Cassilda's Song, a 2015 anthology based on Robert W. Chambers's King in Yellow and written entirely by women, was nominated for two 2016 World Fantasy Awards.

In May 2017, Chaosium appointed award-winning author and editor James Lowder as executive editor of fiction. Lowder had previously served as a consultant for Chaosium, helping the company and freelancers resolve payment and contract problems with past fiction projects.

Although not published by Chaosium, the ongoing Wild Cards series of superhero science fiction originated from a long-running Superworld campaign gamemastered by Game of Thrones author George R. R. Martin and his circle of fellow writers who played in his game.

== Magazines ==
Three magazines have been published by Chaosium to promote its products:

- Wyrm's Footnotes ran for fourteen issues from 1976 to 1982. For the first ten issues, it was a source of supporting material for White Bear and Red Moon. In 1981, starting with Issue #11, it became the official RuneQuest magazine. The last edition published during its initial run was Issue #14, dated April 1982. The magazine was revived in 2012 by Moon Design Publications, continuing the issue numbering at 15, despite the 30-year hiatus. Issues 1 to 14 were republished in PDF format in 2019.
- Different Worlds. Forty-seven bimonthly issues from Different Worlds were published. Chaosium, from 1979 to 1985, published the first thirty-eight and Sleuth Publications, from 1985 to 1987, the final nine. Tadashi Ehara was the editor of the magazine during the periods concerned by both publishing houses.
- Starry Wisdom, a Lovecraft-themed magazine, three issues of which Chaosium published in 1997.

== Reception ==
Chaosium won the 2017 Silver Ennie Award for "Fan’s Choice for Best Publisher".
