= Shadowdale =

Shadowdale is the name of a fictional town and its surrounding areas in the Forgotten Realms line of Dungeons & Dragons products. It may refer to both

- the town of Shadowdale
- the novel Shadowdale, in The Avatar Series
- Shadowdale (module), a game adventure taking place in the town
- Shadowdale: The Scouring of the Land, a game book about the town
