= Peter Corless =

Game designer

- Born: 1964 (age 61–62); New York City, New York, US
- Occupation: Game designer
- Employer(s): West End Games, Green Knight Publishing

Peter Corless is an American game designer who has worked primarily on role-playing games.

== Early life ==
Peter Corless was born in New York City, New York in 1964.

== Career ==
Peter Corless has been part of the gaming industry since the 1980s, first employed at West End Games, where he worked on various projects, from Paranoia to the Star Wars Roleplaying Game and Star Warriors board game. Corless obtained the rights to both the Pendragon game line and fiction line from Chaosium in 1998 when Chaosium defaulted on a loan he had made to them. Using money he made from his employment at Cisco, Corless created the company Green Knight Publishing to publish the Pendragon fiction and RPG lines.

Corless received three roleplaying products as well as two books of fiction that had been in progress at Chaosium; the book of fiction Arthur, the Bear of Britain (1998) was ready to be printed but was delayed due to cashflow problems, so Green Knight was able to get it printed right away, while the other fiction book To the Chapel Perilous (1999) was published in the following year. Corless had Green Knight fully operational by 1999 and published the three role-playing game supplements that Chaosium had originally intended to publish: the adventure books Tales of Chivalry and Romance (1999) and Tales of Magic and Miracles (1999) by Shannon Appelcline, and the Saxons (2000) background book by Roderick Robertson.

Corless eventually became the line editor for the Pendragon role-playing game as a result of financial problems. Corless brought on James Lowder to oversee the Pendragon fiction line for Green Knight in 1999. Corless often opted to pay printers, artists, and authors that Chaosium left unpaid for Pendragon work, although Green Knight not under any obligation to resolve their old debts. Green Knight was unable to continue publishing after a series of events caused financial problems, so Corless first made sure his freelancers had their right returned and fees paid, and then sold the rights and remaining stock of the Pendragon RPG to White Wolf Publishing in 2004, and sold the Pendragon fiction stock to Paizo Publishing in 2005.

== Personal life ==
Corless lives in Mountain View, California.
