= Internal Combustion (short story) =

- Short story by L. Sprague de Camp
- Robert Engle's illustration of the story in Infinity Science Fiction
- Country: United States
- Language: English
- Genre: Science fiction

Publication
- Published in: Infinity Science Fiction
- Publisher: Royal Publications, Inc.
- Media type: Print (Magazine)
- Publication date: February, 1956

"Internal Combustion" is a classic science fiction robot story by L. Sprague de Camp. It was first published in the magazine Infinity Science Fiction for February, 1956. It first appeared in book form in the collection A Gun for Dinosaur and Other Imaginative Tales (Doubleday, 1963); it later appeared in the anthologies Souls in Metal (Hale, 1977) and Top Science Fiction: The Authors' Choice (J. M. Dent, 1984). The story has been translated into German.

== Plot summary ==
A group of six worn-out robots, colloquially called robums, has been squatting in an abandoned mansion in Coquina Beach, North Carolina. Having reached the point where humans no longer consider them worth repairing, they have been discarded, emancipated and left to shift as best they can. They self-identify by nicknames reflective of their personalities or talents taken from human history, legend or literature. Most run on liquid fuel, for which they must forage; their leader, Napoleon, is nuclear-powered, but confined to the rotting mansion by his great weight and an inoperative leg.

While the robums share the usual robotic inhibitions against hostility to human beings, this programming has been eroded by their decrepitude, and in the case of Napoleon, completely broken down under the influence of hard radiation leaking from his atomic pile. He hatches a plan to make a human his puppet, through which he hopes to achieve political domination of mankind. The other robums readily fall in with the plan, dreaming it will grant them "all the kerosene we want and a good gasoline binge whenever we feel like it."

As we first encounter the robums, Napoleon's first attempt to realize his plan has just failed. The kidnapped mendicant intended as his patsy has bolted in panic and been felled by his hench-robot, Hercules; under the heaviness of the latter's blow the victim has been "damaged beyond repair." An alternative plan is adopted, to secure a child they can rear and train. The robum Galahad observes that the absent Homer, another of their number, knows a child — "the Sanborn kid."

Homer, meanwhile, is beachcombing along the shore for shells he can sell for kerosene. As he passes the Sanborn home he is commissioned by the householder, Archie Sanborn, to buy him some gasoline for one of the antique cars he collects. Homer, replying as is his wont in poetry, agrees. Archie's young son Gordon wants to go with Homer but is denied permission. Back at the mansion, Napoleon sends out the robums to fetch a child. Two of them, Galahad and Confucius, meet Homer on his way back from the service station with Archie's gasoline. Learning what he carries, they cajole him to share it with them, and over time succeed. Soon all three robots are on a gasoline binge. While this is happening, Gordon runs away from home looking for Homer. He encounters Hercules, who promises to take the boy to his robot friend.

Back at the mansion Gordon is introduced to Napoleon, who attempts to recruit him to the cause. But Gordon only wants Homer, and his childish petulance quickly drives the robum boss to distraction. He calls for Hercules, only to find him drunk; Galahad, Confucius and Homer have returned with the gasoline, and Hercules has joined in the orgy. Homer is upset that the others have kidnapped Gordon. Then Sancho Panza, the robum on watch, reports the approach of policemen, no doubt in search of the child. Napoleon orders Gordon and the gasoline concealed. The robums feign cooperation with the search, and the police leave without finding anything.

Afterwards the gas is brought back out and the party continues apace. Homer, finding his poetry unappreciated, departs to join Napoleon in the library. After he leaves, a spontaneous gasoline explosion puts an end to the merriment, incapacitating Galahad, Confucius, Hercules and Sancho. Apprehending the danger, Napoleon orders Homer to get him out of the mansion, but Homer, remembering Gordon, abandons his boss and runs up to the attic to save the boy instead.

Shielding his friend from the blaze, Homer knocks out a window and leaps from the burning mansion. The blaze has attracted a crowd, including Gordon's parents, who take him from the robot's arms. Archie asks Homer what happened, but he, his vocal circuits damaged, can only spout a few lines of meaningless poetry before his remaining systems fail. The fire department has arrived, but realizing the mansion is a complete loss the firemen concentrate their attention on saving the neighboring residences.

== Reception ==
P. Schuyler Miller, commenting on the stories in the collection A Gun for Dinosaur, called this piece "[o]ne of the best stories in the lot--in part because it is so unlike the rest." He notes that it "points out that used-up robots may become bums, just like used-up people."

John Clute, reviewing Souls in Metal, considered the collection an "atrocious little money-spinner," whose contents could not have "required more than a modicum of research to uncover," but was kinder in regard to the stories themselves. He rated de Camp's story among its several "warhorses."

Peter D. Pautz lumped the story together with the rest of the contents of Top Science Fiction as "precious gems," and rated the anthology as a whole as "the kind ... that creates new fans, warms the hearts of old ones, and restores the faith of the jaded."

Mike Ashley, discussing de Camp's science fiction from the 1950s, cited the story as an instance of his humorous works, characterizing it as "a spoof about a bunch of robot gangsters." Noting that the author "dipped his toe into the science-fiction pool less frequently as the decade progressed," Ashley called "[h]is appearances ... always welcome, because de Camp's fiction seldom followed the fashion."

== Relation to other works ==
"Internal Combustion" is de Camp's only published robot story. Writing after his colleague Isaac Asimov's influential Three Laws of Robotics had replaced science fiction's traditional concept of robots as menaces with a more benign model, de Camp devised an in-story rationale for his own robots' anti-social actions.
