= Prince of Lies =

Prince of Lies or The Prince of Lies may refer to:

- Hellstorm: Prince of Lies, a short lived comic book series
- Prince of Lies, a single from Scottish music group Cindytalk
- Prince of Lies (novel), book four in The Avatar Series by James Lowder
- The Prince of Lies, a common nickname for Satan
- The Prince of Lies, a nickname for Cyric, a fictional deity in the Forgotten Realms campaign of Dungeons & Dragons
- The Prince of Lies, a vampire in the Buffy the Vampire Slayer universe
