= Theodore Goodridge Roberts =

Canadian novelist and poet

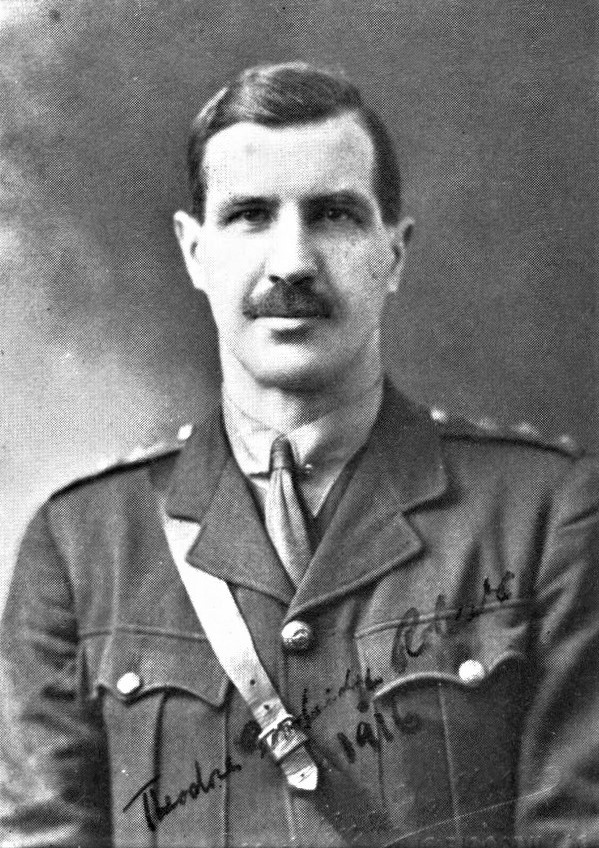
- Born: George Edward Theodore Goodridge Roberts; July 7, 1877; Fredericton, New Brunswick
- Died: February 24, 1953 (aged 75); Digby, Nova Scotia
- Resting place: Forest Hill Cemetery, Fredericton
- Citizenship: British subject
- Education: U of New Brunswick
- Occupation: novelist
- Spouse: Frances Seymour Allen (m. 1903)
- Children: William Goodridge, Dorothy Mary Gostwick, Theodora Frances Bliss, Loveday
- Writing career
- Language: English
- Notable works: The Harbour Master, The Leather Bottle
- Notable awards: FRSC

George Edwards Theodore Goodridge Roberts (July 7, 1877 – February 24, 1953) was a Canadian novelist and poet. He was the author of thirty-four novels and over one hundred published stories and poems.

He was the brother of poet Charles G. D. Roberts, and the father of painter Goodridge Roberts.

== Life ==
Roberts was born in Fredericton, to Emma Wetmore Bliss and Anglican Rev. George Goodridge Roberts. The poet Charles G. D. Roberts, and the writers William Carman Roberts and Elizabeth Roberts MacDonald, were his siblings.

He published his first poem in 1889, when he was eleven, in the New York Independent (where his cousin Bliss Carman was working), and his first prose piece (a comparison of the Battle of Waterloo and the Battle of Gettysburg) in the Century two years later.

Roberts attended Fredericton Collegiate School, though (since school records were lost in a fire) the exact years are unknown. He later went to University of New Brunswick (UNB), but left without graduating. He published poetry in UNB's University Magazine.

In 1897, he moved to New York City, living with his brothers Charles and William and working at The Independent. In 1898 the magazine sent him to Cuba, as a special correspondent, to cover the Spanish–American War. While on the island he contracted malaria—he was sent back to New York and consulted specialists, who sent him back to Fredericton "to die."

An unnamed surgeon saved Roberts's life, and he was nursed back to heath by Frances Seymour Allen (whom he would subsequently marry). The next year he travelled to Newfoundland, where he helped to found and edit The Newfoundland Magazine. He published his first book of poetry Northand Lyrics, an anthology edited by Charles G.D. Roberts and featuring his three siblings in 1899, and his first novel, The House of Isstens, in 1900.

In 1901, Roberts sailed on a barkentine to Brazil. In 1902, he returned to Fredericton and briefly edited a second magazine, The Kit-Bag.

Roberts married Frances Seymour Allen in November 1903, and they had a two-year honeymoon in Barbados where their first child was born. They would have four children: William Goodridge, Dorothy Mary Gostwick, Theodora Frances Bliss and Loveday (who died as an infant).

Roberts averaged three novels a year from 1908 until 1914. At that time his "many novels of adventure and romance" already enjoyed a "wide popularity in English-speaking lands."

A former militiaman, Roberts re-enlisted in 1914 when World War I broke out, serving as a lieutenant in the 12th Canadian Infantry Battalion, commanded by Lt.-Col. Harry Fulton McLeod of Fredericton—Roberts' entire family followed him to England. When the 12th Battalion was assigned to a reserve and training roll in early 1915, Roberts was transferred to a position perhaps better fitted to his combination of military knowledge and literary skill. "In the summer of 1915, he was transferred to the Canadian War Records Office at the request of Max Aitken, Lord Beaverbrook. Roberts wrote official reports and battlefield accounts and published three works in collaboration with others." He was promoted captain early in 1916.

When Roberts was in Europe he left his manuscripts and papers, including work not yet published, with a Dr. Wainwright in Saint John, who stored them in his basement. They were destroyed in the spring of 1919 when the Saint John River flooded.

In 1929, Roberts wrote a weekly column for the Saint John Telegraph-Journal, "Under the Sun." From April through September 1930 he edited another small magazine, Acadie.

In 1932, he undertook his last major sea cruise, sailing through the Panama Canal to Vancouver and back. The same year he did a cross-Canada reading tour, which "culminated with festivities in Vancouver."

Roberts moved to Toronto in 1935, and in 1937 briefly edited another magazine, Spotlight. In 1939, he relocated to Aylmer, Quebec, where he briefly founded another magazine, Swizzles.

He returned to New Brunswick in 1941, and in 1945 moved to Digby, Nova Scotia, where he would die eight years later. He is buried beside Charles G.D. Roberts and Bliss Carman in Fredericton's Forest Hill Cemetery.

== Writing ==
The Dictionary of Literary Biography (DLB) says that T.G. Roberts's "poetry and fiction, staggering in sheer quantity and variety, show at their best Roberts's most enduring gifts: in his poetry a love of nature well served by a keen eye for local color and detail, a good ear for clean, clear rhythm and rhyme, and a forceful, uncluttered narrative line; and in fiction a talent for presenting his abiding perception of universal struggles between good and evil either in mythic tales of adventure or in regional stories animated by local settings, customs, and dialects."

Of the poems in his 1926 collection, The Lost Shipmate, The Encyclopedia of Literature commented: "Had this volume appeared forty years earlier it might have won for Theodore a reputation equal to that of his brother Charles or of Bliss Carman. Poems such as 'The sandbar' and 'Magic' are unmatched in Canadian poetry for a facility and clarity of image suggestive of high-realist painting.

=== The Merriest Knight ===
The writing that Roberts is most likely to be recognized for today is The Merriest Knight, his collection of Arthurian tales. This looks like the one book by Roberts currently in print - ironically, considering that it was never published as a book during Roberts's lifetime.

Roberts began to write Arthurian fiction in the 1920s; most of these stories, though, were published in the late 1940s and early 1950s in the fiction magazine Blue Book. Roberts planned to publish them as a collection, but died in 1953 before he could do so. In 2001, Mike Ashley, editor of the Mammoth publishing group, brought them out under his Green Knight imprint.

=== New Canadian Library ===
Two of Roberts's novels were issued as part of the New Canadian Library series published by McClelland and Stewart: The Harbor Master (#63 in the series) and The Red Feathers (#127).

== Recognition ==
The University of New Brunswick awarded Roberts a Doctorate of literature in 1930.

He was elected a Fellow of the Royal Society of Canada in 1934.

== Publications ==
=== Fiction ===
- The House of Isstens. Boston: L.C. Page, 1900.
- Hemming the Adventurer. Boston: L.C. Page, 1904.
- Brothers of Peril: A Story of Old Newfoundland, 1905. Boston: L.C. Page & Company, 1905.
- Red Feathers: a story of remarkable adventures when the world was young. Boston: L.C. Page, 1907. Toronto: McClelland & Stewart. ISBN 978-0-7710-9227-5
- Captain Love. Boston: L.C. Page & Company, 1908.
- Flying Plover: His Stories, Told Him by Squat-by-the-Fire. Boston: L.C. Page, 1909.
- A Cavalier of Virginia: a romance. Chicago: M.A. Donohue, 1910.
- Comrades of the Trails. Boston: L.C. Page & Company, 1910.
- Love on a Smokey River. 1911.
- A Captain of Raleigh's: a romance. Boston: L.C. Page & Company, 1911.
- A Soldier of Valley Forge. with Robert Neilson Stephens. Boston: L.C. Page, 1911.
- Blessington's Folly. London: John Long, 1912.
- Rayton: a backwoods mystery. Boston: L.C. Page, 1912.
- The Harbor Master. Chicago: M.A. Donohue, 1913. Published in England as The Toll of the Tides. London: T. Werner Laurie, 1912.
- Two Shall Be Born. New York: Cassell, 1913.
- The Wasp. Toronto: Bell & Cockburn, 1914.
- In the High Woods. London: John. Long, 1916.
- Forest Fugitives. Toronto: McClelland, Goodchild & Stewart, 1917.
- The Islands of Adventure. London; Toronto: Hodder and Stoughton, 1918.
- Jess of the River. London: John Long, 1918.
- The Exiled Lover. London: John Long, 1919.
- Honest Fool. New York: F.A. Munsey, 1925.
- The Master of the Moosehorn and Other Backwoods Stories. London; Toronto: Hodder and Stoughton, 1919.
- Moonshine. London: Hodder and Stoughton, [1920?].
- The Lure of Piper's Glen. Garden City, NY: Doubleday, Page, 1921.
- The Fighting Starkleys. George Varian illus. Boston: Page, 1922.
- Musket House. 1922.
- Tom Akerley: his adventures in the tall ≈timber and at Gaspard's clearing on the Indian River. Boston: L.C. Page, 1923.
- Green Timber Thoroughbreds. New York: Garden City, 1924.
- The Stranger from Up-Along. Garden City, NJ: Doubleday, Page & co., 1924.
- The Red Pirogue: a tale of adventure in the Canadian wilds. Boston: L.C. Page, 1924.
- The Oxbow Wizard. Garden City, NY: Garden City Pub., 1924.
- The Lost Shipmate. Toronto: Ryerson, 1926.
- The Golden Highlanders. Boston: L.C. Page, 1929.
- The Merriest Knight: The Collected Arthurian Tales of Theodore Goodridge Roberts. Mike Ashley ed. Green Knight, 2001. ISBN 978-1-928999-18-8

=== Non-fiction ===
- Patrols and Trench Raids. 1916.
- Battalion Histories. 1918.
- Thirty Canadian V.Cs 23 April 1915 to 30 March 1918, with Robin Richards and Stuart Martin. London: Skeffington, 1918.
- Loyalists: a compilation of histories, biographies and genealogies of United empire loyalists and their descendants. Toronto: T. Goodridge Roberts, 1937.

=== Poetry ===
- Northland Lyrics, William Carman Roberts, Theodore Roberts & Elizabeth Roberts Macdonald; selected and arranged with a prologue by Charles G.D. Roberts and an epilogue by Bliss Carman. Boston: Small, Maynard & Co., 1899. ISBN 0-665-12501-1
- Seven Poems. private, 1925. chapbook.
- The Lost Shipmate. Toronto: Ryerson Chapbook, 1926.
- The Leather Bottle. Toronto: Ryerson, 1934.
- That Far River: Selected Poems of Theodore Goodridge Roberts. Martin Ware, ed. London, ON: Canadian Poetry Press, 1998.

Except where noted, bibliographical information courtesy St. Thomas University.
