= Tournament of Dreams =

Arthurian tabletop role-playing adventure

- Cover illustration by Steve Purcell
- Designers: Les Brooks, Sam Shirley, Greg Stafford
- Publishers: Chaosium
- Publication: 1987
- Genres: Arthurian
- Systems: Basic Role-Playing

Tournament of Dreams is an Arthurian tabletop role-playing adventure, written by Les Brooks, Sam Shirley, and Greg Stafford, with cover art by Steve Purcell, and interior art by Susan Seddon Boulet, and published by Chaosium in 1987. Tournament of Dreams was the second adventure published for the award winning Pendragon.

== Plot summary ==
Tournament of Dreams includes two scenarios involving jousting and duels as tests of morals and bravery for the player character knights:

- The Tournament of Dreams At a tournament in the pagan land of Sugales, the knights are tempted by enchantments as they are drawn into a courtly power struggle. The adventure includes a map of Sugales.
- Circle of Gold The knights must win their way to the fiefdom known as the Circle of Gold (described in the Noble's Book) by defeating the land's chivalric defenders in single combat.

== Publication history ==
Tournament of Dreams is a 48-page softcover book that was written by Les Brooks, Sam Shirley, and Greg Stafford, with a cover by Steve Purcell, illustrations by Susan Seddon Boulet, and cartography by Caroline Schultz.

== Reception ==
In the November 1989 edition of Dragon (Issue #151), Jim Bambra was impressed, saying "the quality of the graphic presentation is high" and "the writing draws the reader into the adventure and makes it a pleasure to run." Bambra thought the treatment of enchantment effects in the first adventure was "superb and admirably conveys the dreamlike quality of the pagan otherworld." He described the second adventure as "more straightforward in style." He concluded with a strong recommendation, saying, "High in suspense and narrative values, it deserves to be in every gamer's collection."

== Awards ==
Tournament of Dreams was awarded the Origins Award for "Best Roleplaying Adventure of 1987".
