= The Last Heretic =

Collection of fantasy short stories

- Cover of first edition
- Author: Darrell Schweitzer
- Cover artist: Jason Van Hollander
- Language: English
- Series: The Best Short Fiction of Darrell Schweitzer
- Genre: Fantasy
- Publisher: PS Publishing
- Publication date: 2020
- Publication place: United Kingdom
- Media type: Print (hardcover)
- Pages: xi, 375
- ISBN: 978-1-786364-44-9
- OCLC: 1155589398
- Preceded by: The Mysteries of the Faceless King

The Last Heretic: The Best Short Fiction of Darrell Schweitzer Volume II is a collection of fantasy short stories by American author Darrell Schweitzer. It was first published in hardcover by PS Publishing in April 2020 as the second of its two volume set The Best Short Fiction of Darrell Schweiter. An ebook edition followed from the same publisher in September of the same year.

== Summary ==
The book contains twenty-three short works of fiction and a section of notes on the stories by the author, together with an introduction by Paul Di Filippo.

== Contents ==
- "The Very Model of a Modern Maven Science-Fictional" [introduction] (Paul Di Filippo)
- "On the Last Night of the Festival of the Dead" (from Interzone no. 90, Dec. 1994)
- "Fighting the Zeppelin Gang" (from Postscripts no. 8, Autumn 2006)
- "The Corpse Detective" (from Dark Fusions: Where Monsters Lurk!, Oct. 2013)
- "The Clockwork King, the Queen of Glass, and the Man with the Hundred Knives" (from Black Wings II: New Tales of Lovecraftian Horror, Jun. 2012)
- "Hanged Man and Ghost" (from The Weird Fiction Review, no. 5, Fall 2014)
- "Kvetchula" (from Marion Zimmer Bradley's Fantasy v. 9, no. 4, Summer 1997)
- "The Dead Kid" (from The Book of More Flesh, Oct. 2002)
- "Running to Camelot" (from Marion Zimmer Bradley's Fantasy v. 10, no. 4, Summer 1998)
- "The Last Heretic" (from The New and Perfect Man, Mar. 2011)
- "How It Ended" (from Realms of Fantasy v. 8, no. 6, Aug. 2002)
- "A Lost City of the Jungle" (from Astounding Hero Tales, 2007)
- "Some Unpublished Correspondence of the Younger Pliny" (from The Mammoth Book of Roman Whodunnits, 2003)
- "Envy, the Gardens of Ynath, and the Sin of Cain" (from Interzone no. 178, Apr. 2002)
- "The Fire Eggs" (from Interzone no. 153, Mar. 2000)
- "The Emperor of the Ancient Word" (from Space and Time no. 99, Spring 2005)
- "Bitter Chivalry" (from Realms of Fantasy v. 6, no. 3, Feb. 1999)
- "The Adventure of the Hanoverian Vampires" (from Crafty Cat Crimes - 100 Tiny Cat Tale Mysteries, 2000)
- "Spiderwebs in the Dark" (from Black Wings III, Feb. 2014)
- "The Most Beautiful Dead Woman in the World" (from Interzone no. 189, May/Jun. 2003)
- "The Eater of Hours" (from Allen K's Inhuman Magazine no. 4, Sum. 2009)
- "The Tale and the Teller" (from Weirdbook no. 35, May 2017)
- "Pages From an Invisible Book" (from The Company He Keeps, Sep. 2010)
- "Ring the Living Bells" (new to this collection)
- "Story Notes"

== Reception ==
Michael Dirda in The Washington Post, calling the author "[o]ne of fantastika’s most energetic and versatile talents," and the set of anthologies "two princely volumes," notes that in them the Schweitzer "has finally received the kind of sumptuous career retrospective that most writers can only dream about." He characterizes the contents as "over 40 of [the author's] favorite short stories, [ranging] from the dark and Lovecraftian to the touching and oddball." From this volume he singles out "The Adventure of the Hanoverian Vampires," in which "Sherlock Holmes battles the Undead, assisted by a small cat," for particular comment, observing, "[a]s the well-read Schweitzer unobtrusively acknowledges," that the alternate 19th-century Britain in which it is set was "borrowed ... from Joan Aiken's rumbustious Dido Twite novels."

Fellow author John R. Fultz praises the release of this "two-volume hardcover collection of Schweitzer’s best work," calling him "in one respect, the fantasy world’s best kept secret ... the quality and originality of [whose] work towers far above the man himself." Fultz feels "it’s about time someone published a retrospective looking back across [the author's] long and distinguished career," saluting "PS Publishing for recognizing [his] greatness while he’s still around to see it." Noting the stories included were "chosen by Darrell himself," Fultz predicts "[h]is hardcore fans will snap up these ... immediately," and hopes they result in "a whole new legion of fans." screaming and clawing from one of the world’s greatest imaginations." Of the He calls author "an acknowledged master of the short-story form" with "one of the world's greatest imaginations," and "a quick sense of humor" one "might never guess from reading his darkest works." Fultz also expresses appreciation for the cover art, calling it a "[g]reat example of Van Hollander’s phantasmagorical style,[and] a perfect match for Darrell’s weird prose."
