= The Boy King =

The Boy King may refer to:

- Tutankhamun (c. 1341 BC – c. 1323 BC), Egyptian pharaoh of the 18th dynasty
- Edward VI (1537–1553), English king of the Tudor dynasty
- The Boy King (novel), a 2016 historical fiction novel
- The Boy King (Pendragon), a 1991 source book for the role-playing game Pendragon
