= Knights Adventurous =

Knights Adventurous is a 1990 role-playing game supplement published by Chaosium for Pendragon.

== Contents ==
Knights Adventurous is a supplement in which character creation is expanded by introducing new nationalities, including Saxon, Roman, French, Pictish, Occitanian, and Irish, as well as new religious options such as Pagan, Wotanic, and Jewish. It also provides new rules to cover character wealth and additional campaign setting details.

== Publication history ==
Knights Adventurous was written by Greg Stafford and published by Chaosium in 1990 as a 144-page book with a large color map.

Shannon Appelcline noted that the new edition of King Arthur Pendragon published in 1990 "marked a massive expansion of the game, allowing for the inclusion of many different types of knights through its companion book Knights Adventurous (1990)."

== Reviews ==
- GamesMaster International (Issue 9 - Apr 1991)
- Casus Belli #61
