= Prince of Lies (novel) =

1993 novel by James Lowder

- Author: James Lowder
- Language: English
- Genre: Fantasy novel
- Published: 1993
- Publication place: United States
- Media type: Print (Paperback)
- ISBN: 978-1-56076-626-1 (first edition); 978-0-7869-3114-9 (reprint)
- Followed by: Crucible: The Trial of Cyric the Mad

Prince of Lies is a fantasy novel by James Lowder, set in the world of the Forgotten Realms, and based on the Dungeons & Dragons role-playing game. It is the fourth novel in "The Avatar Series". It was published in paperback in August 1993. It was re-issued in paperback in September 2003.

== Plot summary ==
Prince of Lies accounts for what occurred after the Tablets were returned to Ao, including the aftermath of the ascension of several Company members to godhood (Midnight took the mantle of Mystra, Kelemvor became god of the dead, and Cyric took multiple vile deities' portfolios).

== Reception ==
Prince of Lies appeared on the 2024 Game Rant "31 Best Dungeons & Dragons Novels, Ranked" list at #23.
