= The Pendragon Campaign =

Arthurian tabletop role-playing game supplement

Plot, Magic & Scenarios
- Illustration by Tom Sullivan, 1985.
- Designers: Greg Stafford
- Publishers: Chaosium
- Publication: 1985
- Genres: Arthurian
- Systems: Basic Role-Playing

The Pendragon Campaign is an Arthurian tabletop role-playing supplement, written by Greg Stafford, with art by Tom Sullivan, and published by Chaosium in 1985. This was the first product for the award-winning Pendragon game, an eighty-year campaign across Arthurian history.

== Publication history ==
Originally published in 1985, it was republished in 2018 in PDF format. It was completely revised as The Boy King in 1991 and 1997, then further revised as The Great Pendragon Campaign in 2006.

== Contents ==
The Pendragon Campaign details King Arthur's Britain and surrounding lands, as well as the major characters of the Pendragon setting and an expanded timeline. The Pendragon Campaign features a detailed year-by-year analysis of the Arthurian era from 495 to 570 CE, integrating the stories of Mallory, Nennius, and French Vulgate with Welsh, and Saxon sources.

== Reception ==
Graham Staplehurst reviewed The Pendragon Campaign for White Dwarf #74, giving it an overall rating of 9 out of 10, and stated that "The TPC on the whole is a very good production, and an essential addition to Pendragon."

Anthony Fiorito reviewed The Pendragon Campaign for Different Worlds magazine and stated that "If the Pendragon boxed set is the skeleton of the game system, then The Pendragon Campaign is flesh for the bones."

Steven A. List reviewed The Pendragon Campaign in Space Gamer/Fantasy Gamer No. 77. List commented that "It is not essential to playing KAP or even running a KAP campaign, but it is extremely useful in that regard and is in itself entertaining and informative reading for those with more than a passing interest in the Arthur of history, literature and legend."

Stewart Wieck reviewed The Pendragon Campaign in White Wolf #7 (1987), rating it a 9 out of 10 and stated that "an excellent first supplement that contains a campaign overview and several short, first phase adventures."

The Pendragon Campaign won the H.G. Wells Award for Best Roleplaying Supplement of 1985.

The Great Pendragon Campaign won the Diana Jones Award - a major juried award "for excellence in gaming" - in 2007.

== Reviews ==
- Polyhedron #32 (1986)
