= Pagan Shore =

WWII board wargame

- Cover art by Stephen King
- Designers: John Carnahan
- Illustrators: Stephen King; Wayne A. Reynolds
- Publishers: Chaosium
- Publication: 1994
- Genres: Arthurian

Pagan Shore is a supplement published by Chaosium in 1994 for the Arthurian role-playing game Pendragon that describes medieval Ireland in terms of the game.

== Description ==
Pagan Shore begins with an introductory glossary of Gaelic terms that are used frequently in the book.

The first chapter presents an overview of medieval Ireland, including climate, fauna, flora, peat bogs, religious sites and mounds, monasteries, places of particular interest, clans, battle sites, and geographical particularities. Several full-page maps are included such as a map of Dublin and a political map of the island.

The second chapter covers the Irish people, starting with general laws of honor, property and war. The major peoples of Ireland in the Pendragon game are then outlined: Gaelic Irish, Cruithni (Irish Picts) and Lochlannach (somewhat ahistorical Norse raiders), Irish Knights, and English residing in Ireland. Political states, common attitudes and various legends or famous characters of each people are included.

The third chapter deals with Irish magic. Spellcasters such as the Druids are discussed, as well as pre-Christian Irish deities, and monsters of legend. The concept of geas is explained, a magical prohibition that is pronounced over each new child; the day that each person breaks their geas is the day that they die.

The fourth chapter outlines how to create an Irish player character for the game.

The fifth and final chapter presents Irish tales that could be used by the gamemaster as a background to adventures.

Unlike previously published Pendragon supplements, this book contains no adventures or scenarios.

== Publication history ==
The Arthurian role-playing game Pendragon was published by Chaosium in 1985, and a large number of supplements and adventures followed. One of the supplements was Pagan Shore, a 128-page softcover book designed by John Carnahan, with cover art by Stephen King, interior art by Wayne A. Reynolds, and cartography by Darrell Midgette.

== Reception ==
In Issue 18 of the Australian RPG magazine Australian Realms, Andrew Daniels liked the high production values, noting that it was "up to Chaosium's usual high standard of presentation, being clearly ad concisely written typset, and liberally illustrated with good quality black and white drawings." Daniels thought the chapter detailing Irish background gave "a nice feel for the setting and how Pendragon Ireland functions." Daniels also commented that placing Irish mysticism in context with its society was "something often overlooked in other roleplaying products." Daniels concluded by calling this book "a positive step for the Pendragon game. It places the game outside of the usual constraints of the Malorian Cycle, and so gives the players greater variety and scope for their actions ... Highly recommended for Pendragon players and strongly suggested for anyone looking for a different setting for their next fantasy or historical campaign."

Chris Hind reviewed Pagan Shores in White Wolf #48 (Oct., 1994), rating it a 4.5 out of 5 and stated that "Pagan Shores contains almost everything you need to run a flavorful Irish campaign. Of course, you need the Pendragon rulebook. Then again, the book should be just as informative for any historical-fantasy RPG, such as Ars Magica."

In Issue 27 of the Hungarian RPG magazine Biberhold, Dániel Kodaj thought this book was far more detailed than previous Pendragon products, noting its "unheard-of depth". Kodaj called the chapter on Irish background "a readable and thought-provoking presentation", and the chapter on Irish legends "very useful."

In Issue 17 of the British RPG magazine Arcane, Jo Walton highly recommended Pagan Shore as an excellent resource for creating an ancient Irish campaign world, saying, "Pagan Shore is suitable for tweaking to make a more Celtic game. There are a number of ways it could be used — either by adjusting the technology and the anachronistic elements to produce a realistic fifth-century Britain, or by emphasising the magical elements and bringing in the Sidhe and the Otherworld elements to explain what is there in traditional Arthurian stories that wouldn't fit the period."
