= The Mammoth Book of Mindblowing SF =

2009 anthology edited by Mike Ashley

- Editor: Mike Ashley
- Cover artist: Joe Roberts
- Genre: Science fiction anthology
- Publisher: Running Press
- Publication date: 25 August 2009
- Pages: 531
- ISBN: 978-0762437238

The Mammoth Book of Mindblowing SF is an anthology of science fiction short stories edited by Mike Ashley, and published in 2009.

== Reception ==
The anthology attracted substantial criticism because all authors were white men. In Strange Horizons, Graham Sleight reviewed it negatively, noting that "whole worlds of human experience are largely absent from this book—the sexual, the interpersonal, the everyday" and concluding that the anthology was "damaged by its narrowness" in attempting to evoke a sense of wonder through technophilia.

== Contents ==
An asterisk (*) denotes stories original to the anthology.

- Out of the Sun by Arthur C. Clarke
- The Pevatron Rats by Stephen Baxter *
- The Edge of the Map by Ian Creasey
- Cascade Point by Timothy Zahn
- A Dance to Strange Musics by Gregory Benford
- Palindromic by Peter Crowther
- Castle in the Sky by Robert Reed *
- The Hole in the Hole by Terry Bisson
- Hotrider by Keith Brooke
- Mother Grasshopper by Michael Swanwick
- Waves and Smart Magma by Paul Di Filippo *
- The Black Hole Passes by John Varley
- The Peacock King by Ted White and Larry McCombs
- Bridge by James Blish
- Anhedonia by Adam Roberts *
- Tiger Burning by Alastair Reynolds
- The Width of the World by Ian Watson
- Our Lady of the Sauropods by Robert Silverberg
- Into the Miranda Rift by G. David Nordley
- The Rest is Speculation by Eric Brown *
- Vacuum States by Geoffrey A. Landis
