= The Spectre King =

1992 Role-playing supplement for Pendragon game

- Publishers: Chaosium
- Publication: 1992; 34 years ago
- Genres: Arthurian fantasy
- Systems: Basic Role-Playing variant

The Spectre King is a 1992 role-playing supplement for Pendragon published by Chaosium.

== Contents ==
The Spectre King is a supplement in which five adventures are included, along with guidelines for the Grand Tourney of Logres, and a description of Cambridge.

== Reception ==
Chris Hind reviewed The Spectre King in White Wolf #35 (March/April, 1993), rating it a 4 out of 5 and stated that "Not surprisingly, Chaosium has forged another masterpiece with The Spectre King."

== Reviews ==
- Dragon #200 (Dec., 1993)
- Beaumains (Issue 2 - 1993)
