= Shadowdale (module) =

Role-playing game adventure

- Code: FRE1
- Authors: Ed Greenwood
- First published: 1989

Shadowdale is an adventure module published by TSR in 1989 for the Advanced Dungeons & Dragons fantasy role-playing game. It is the first of the three-part Avatar series, the second being Tantras and the third Waterdeep. The trilogy of adventures were written and released at the same time as an identically titled trilogy of novels.

== Plot summary ==
Shadowdale is a Forgotten Realms scenario designed, along with the other two adventures of the trilogy, to move AD&D players from the 1st edition of the game to the 2nd edition. In the Forgotten Realms, the player characters find themselves caught up in the Time of Troubles, when gods have been cast from the heavens and walk on through the Realms as mortals. In the midst of this, player characters leave Shadowdale on a quest to the city of Waterdeep.

== Publication history ==
In 1989, TSR made the decision to publish a second edition of AD&D. In order to move the players from the old edition to the new, TSR released a trilogy of adventures along with an identically titled trilogy of novels and trilogy of comic books. FRE1 Shadowdale was written by Ed Greenwood, with a cover by Jeff Easley, and was published by TSR in 1989 as a 32-page booklet with an outer three pane folder with a color fold-out map. The adventure was written as the second edition rules were being finalized and while the corresponding novel Shadowdale was also being written by Scott Ciencin. As critic Daniel Bart noted, some of the 2nd edition rules used in the adventure do not match the final second edition rules, and author Ed Greenwood was required to rewrite part of the adventure so as not to reveal information that would provide spoilers for the novel.

== Reception ==
Writing for Adventureiros dos Reinos, Daniel Bart noted the reliance of the adventure on the plot from Scott Ciencin's corresponding novel. He also noted that due to this, some of the adventure felt "pre-determined" rather than dependent on the actions of the players.

In the first issue of the Brazilian magazine Coleção Dragão Brasil, Grahal liked most of the content in Shadowdale, and found "The only visible flaw in this Second Edition of Forgotten Realms comes if you like playing clerics: the description of the gods is incomplete regarding the stats needed to create clerics, and there is also no data on avatars. It is then almost mandatory to purchase Forgotten Realms Adventures, which contain the clerical spheres and Granted Powers."

== Other reviews and commentary ==
- Fantasi & Virkelighed Issue 3 (1989, in Danish)
- Fantasywelt Issue 24 (1989, in German)
