= Beyond the Wall: Pictland & The North =

Role-playing supplement for Pendragon game

Beyond the Wall
Pictland & The North
- Cover by Stephen King
- Designers: Chris Lampard; Roderick Robertson; Tom Rogan; Eric Rowe; Dave Williams
- Publishers: Chaosium
- Publication: 1995; 31 years ago
- Genres: Arthurian fantasy
- Systems: Basic Role-Playing variant

Beyond the Wall is a supplement published by Chaosium in 1995 for the Arthurian fantasy role-playing game Pendragon.

== Description ==
Beyond the Wall describes the region of Scotland north of Hadrian's Wall. The book contains background on the area, notes on the Pictish culture, a fold-out map, and information on barbarian religions.

Topics covered include

- Details of Pictish society, locales, dwellings, coming of age ceremonies, religion, and tattooing
- Campaign tips for referees

The book includes three mini-adventures and one long adventure, "The Treacherous Pict", in which the player-knights escort a priest to the Picts in order to convert them to Christianity.

The magical talents of the Fiosaiche (Shamans) are highlighted, with focus on the Samhladhs, powerful spirits with ancient relationships within a clan.

== Publication history ==
Chaosium published the Arthurian role-playing game Pendragon in 1985. Ten years later, they published the supplement Beyond the Wall, a 128-page softcover book with an 11" x 15" map sheet designed by Chris Lampard, Roderick Robertson, Tom Rogan, Eric Rowe, and Dave Williams, with interior illustrations by Arnie Swekel, and cover art by Stephen King.

== Reception ==
In the May 1996 edition of Dragon (Issue #229), Rick Swan was impressed by the book's setting, saying, "Beyond the Wall draws on one of the most volatile periods of European history, the rise of the savage Picts in northern Britain. With their militant outlook and barbaric traditions, the Picts make perfect foils for the courtly knights of Pendragon." However, Swan pointed out that the book presumes a working knowledge of the Pictish era, and commented "if you slept through history class, you may find much of this baffling." He was also disappointed by the lack of detail of locations, saying the descriptions were too short and left too many unanswered questions. Swan liked the included adventure, saying it "not only brings the sourcebook material to life, but stands as one of the best Pendragon adventures." Swan concluded by giving the book an above-average rating of 5 out of 6, calling it "a solid example of history-based role-playing... If you want to learn the basics of setting design, you'd be hard-pressed to find better blueprints."

In Issue 26 of Australian Realms, Paul Mittig found the book had pros and cons. On the plus side "I enjoyed both the source and adventure material. This book also gives a pretty good insight into the minds and culture of the early Pictish people." However, "On the other side of the coin, the supplement doesn't really detail the actual lands and places much. Most places get a single paragraph or two, meaning the referee will have to do a bit of prep work." Mittig also would have preferred the map to be printed in color rather than black & white. Mittig concluded, "For those wanting to take their Pendragon characters beyond Hadnan’s wall, this is a very worthwhile investment."

== Awards ==
At the 1995 Origins Awards, Beyond the Wall was a finalist in the category "Best Role-playing Rules."
