= Dragonwall =

1990 novel by Troy Denning

- Cover of the first edition
- Author: Troy Denning
- Language: English
- Genre: Fantasy novel
- Published: 1990
- Publication place: United States
- Media type: Print (Paperback)
- ISBN: 978-0-88038-919-8
- Preceded by: Horselords
- Followed by: Crusade

Dragonwall is a fantasy novel by Troy Denning, set in the world of the Forgotten Realms, and based on the Dungeons & Dragons role-playing game. It is the second novel in "The Empires Trilogy". It was published in paperback in August 1990.

== Characters ==
- Batu Min Ho
- Hsuan Yu Po
- Wu
- Kwan Chan Sen
- Ju-Hai Chou
- Ting Mei Wan
- Kai Tsao Shou Chin

== Pitch ==
Panic invades Shou Lung as the Tuigan army advances inexorably. All attempts to repel the enemy have failed. The emperor himself thus support the young general Batu Min Ho to accomplish the impossible. While Batu and his stepfather develop a secret plan for the army of invading country, his wife Wu and her children in the care of the emperor, soon to discover that senior members of the Bureaucracy is a funny game.

== Plot summary ==
After all attempts by the Minister of War Kwan Chan Sen have failed miserably, Emperor Kai Tsao Shou Chin instructs the General Batu Min Ho to counter the enemy. Tuiganes its origins suggest indeed think the emperor that he can repel the barbarians, but his loyalty is in doubt after the discovery of blatant evidence of treason. This is why his wife Wu and her children are left under the protection of the Emperor, ostensibly for their safety, unofficially as hostages.

Batu Min Ho then develops a plan with the help of her stepfather, General Hsuan Yu Po, of encircling and ensnare Tuigan in the town of Shu Kuan. Hsuan and his army attract enemy, leading tough battles and testing the use of cannon powder. When Batu reaches Shou Kuan after ascending the river Shengti the Tuigan are trapped but the army of Hsuan is destroyed. Vastly superior in numbers, Tuigan cannot be dislodged, but cannot break the siege. The status quo and a brief negotiation with Koja, the spokesman Khahan, Batu lead to return to the Emperor. But the dark revelations await: he is accused of treason.

In fact, the wife and children of Batu, at the center of intrigues bureaucracy, soon to discover that the Minister of War Kwan Chan Sen and Minister of State Ju-Hai Chou are at the origin of the attack against Yamun Khahan, and thus the war. Wu discovered at the same time that the Minister of Security, Ting Mei Wan, sing the War Minister and is none other than the traitor who informs enemies. However, she is accused of treason by Ting and she and her children are executed before he could reveal what they know. When Batu joined the imperial palace, he is accused of treason by the Minister of Public Safety, but a document submitted by the Tuigan help prove innocence are confused and Ting Mei Wan.

The Emperor publicly perform treacherous and decides to grant the Chief Tuigan it asks the two ministers sponsors of the attack. This puts an end to the war and the Emperor then offers Batu a minister in recognition of his services. Thereof, devastated by the loss of his family refused and left the service of the Emperor, joining the Tuigan army. Yamun Khahan is delighted to welcome a good general in its ranks. He did not in fact abandoned its ambitions and is already planning his next conquest. The being is now a dead end, his thoughts turn to the west and the conquest of Faerûn .

== Reception ==
One reviewer commented: "The older Realms books continue to surprise me though. I'm always so used to the newer ones to have happy endings with clearly defined heroes. [...] But Dragonwall has neither. Our 'hero's' family is butchered and he leaves his homeland to join the barbarian army and tries to help them conquer Faerun. Not don’t get me wrong, I enjoy these kinds of not-so-happily-ever-afters, I just tend to forget the older Realms are so rife with them."
