= Blood & Lust =

1991 role-playing supplement for Pendragon

- Publishers: Chaosium
- Publication: 1991; 35 years ago
- Genres: Historical, Fantasy
- Systems: Basic Role-Playing variant

Blood & Lust is a 1991 role-playing supplement for Pendragon published by Chaosium.

== Contents ==
Blood & Lust is a supplement in which information is provided about travelling, and includes four adventures and numerous shorter ones.

== Reception ==
Chris Hind reviewed Blood and Lust in White Wolf #33 (Sept./Oct. 1992), rating it a 4 out of 5 and stated that "Overall, Blood and Lust is excellent in both form and content. Its only fault is poorly drawn maps—a minor gripe since the rest of the product is so good."

== Reviews ==
- Envoyer (Issue 50 – Dec 2000)
