= Horselords =

1990 novel by David Cook

- Cover of the first edition
- Author: David Cook
- Language: English
- Genre: Fantasy novel
- Published: 1990
- Publication place: United States
- Media type: Print (Paperback)
- ISBN: 978-0-88038-904-4
- Followed by: Dragonwall

Horselords is a fantasy novel by David Cook, set in the world of the Forgotten Realms, and based on the Dungeons & Dragons role-playing game. It is the first novel in "The Empires Trilogy". It was published in paperback in May 1990.

== Pitch ==
Koja, a priest of Furo, is sent by the prince Ogandi, leader of the Khazari to meet Yamun Khahan, the head of the newly unified Tuigan. The prince is concerned that the self styled Illustrious Emperor of all Nations has a desire for conquests; that the Khahan could push to invade his small country. Koja undertakes the journey to learn of the Tuigan ways, but once there, nothing is as he had imagined. Drama unfolds and the priest learns quickly that his fate will be linked to that of the Tuigan and their leader, resulting in an epic adventure full of action and twists.

== Plot summary ==
Koja is presented to Yamun Khahan while his army stands before the city of Semphar, threatening to submit it to the khahan's authority. Impressed by the erudition and the diplomatic skills of the monk, Yamun makes Koja his regular historian in charge to relate how a simple warrior Tuigan became the Illustrious Emperor of All Nations (because it is his ambition). Its role rapidly gains importance and is responsible for diplomacy Khahan and even became his anda (blood brother) after saving her life.

The Tuigan generals do not like to see a foreigner so close to their leader, notably General Chanar Ong Kho, also an anda of Khahan, and Yamun's own mother, Bayalun Khadun, who has a visceral hatred for her son. Thus, after other conquests of the Tuigans, such as the capture of the Khazari, Koja manages to foil a plot against the Khahan. The Tuigan leaders of the plot are severely punished but the foreign sponsors are untouchable because they are located in the powerful empire of Shou Lung.

This will not deter the Khahan from washing away what he considers a personal affront and after a first battle during which Koja's magical talents allow him to open a breach in the Dragon Wall, the invasion of Shou Lung can truly begin.

== Main characters ==
- Koja
- Yamun Khahan
- Chanar Ong Kho
- Bayalun Khadun
- Prince Ogandi

== Reception ==
One reviewer commented: "I recognize so many names from he book as being taken or inspired from history. I gained my own interest in Ghengis Khan through another series and did some independent research. So Horselords was a little boring for me because it seems like I've been through it already."

== Reviews ==
- Review by Ian Sales (1991) in Paperback Inferno, #89
