= Souls in Metal =

1977 anthology of science fiction short stories edited by Mike Ashley

- Dust cover of first edition, 1977
- Author: edited by Mike Ashley
- Language: English
- Genre: Science fiction
- Publisher: Robert Hale
- Publication date: 1977
- Publication place: United Kingdom
- Media type: Print (hardcover)
- Pages: 207
- ISBN: 0-7091-5891-2

Souls in Metal: an Anthology of Robot Futures is an anthology of robot-themed science fiction short stories edited by Mike Ashley. It was first published in hardcover by Robert Hale in February 1977 in the United Kingdom, with an American hardcover edition following from St. Martin's Press in June of the same year, and a paperback edition from Jove/HBJ in June 1978.

The book collects nine short stories and novelettes. The stories were originally published in the magazines Astounding, The Magazine of Fantasy & Science Fiction, Infinity, Fantastic Universe, and Galaxy. The book includes a preface and afterword by the editor.

== Contents ==
- "Preface" (Mike Ashley)
- "Helen O'Loy" (Lester del Rey)
- "—That Thou Art Mindful of Him!" (Isaac Asimov)
- "The Twonky" (Henry Kuttner and C. L. Moore (as Lewis Padgett))
- "A Logic Named Joe" (Murray Leinster)
- "Impostor" (Philip K. Dick)
- "Who Can Replace a Man?" (Brian W. Aldiss)
- "The Velvet Glove" (Harry Harrison)
- "I Am Crying All Inside" (Clifford D. Simak)
- "Internal Combustion" (L. Sprague de Camp)
- "Afterword" (Mike Ashley)

== Reception ==
John Clute considered the collection a "jalopy of a book," an "atrocious little money-spinner," whose contents could not have "required more than a modicum of research to uncover." Of the editor, he wrote "In general his editorial comments are among the most illiterate ever printed, with high-school syntax howlers and unintended neologisms breeding together ... like fruit flies in Hiroshima, nor on decipherment is what he says about his assemblage of stories even interestingly false." Clute was kinder in regard to the stories themselves. He singled out for particular praise del Rey's "Helen O'Loy," "that famous crazy comedy romp." The other tales he lumped together as "warhorses," with the exception of the Aldiss piece, which he neglected to mention.
