= Land of Giants (Pendragon) =

- Author: Chris Hind
- Publisher: Chaosium
- Publication date: 1996
- ISBN: 978-1568820552

Land of Giants is a 1996 role-playing game supplement published by Chaosium for Pendragon.

== Contents ==
Land of Giants is a supplement in which the setting is the unfamiliar lands of Thule, and the book encourages players to immerse themselves in its Northern setting through custom character creation, cultural insights, and detailed political frameworks. The centerpiece is a 100-year campaign timeline and two scenarios that reimagine Beowulf, allowing players to take center stage in legendary battles rather than the titular hero.

== Reception ==
Andrew Rilstone reviewed Land of Giants for Arcane magazine, rating it a 9 out of 10 overall, and stated that "Considered on its own merits, this is really quite a ridiculously good book - not so much a supplement for Pendragon, more a new, painstakingly researched game which happens to use the Pendragon rules."

== Reviews ==
- Backstab #2
- Casus Belli #102
