= The Book of All Flesh =

Book by James Lowder

Book of All Flesh
- Author: James Lowder
- Language: English
- Publisher: Eden Studios
- Publication date: 2001
- Publication place: United States
- Pages: 320
- ISBN: 1-891153-87-0
- OCLC: 49346900
- Followed by: The Book of More Flesh

The Book of All Flesh is the first of three Zombie anthologies James Lowder edited for Eden Studios as a tie-in to their gaming system All Flesh Must Be Eaten. The book is followed by The Book of More Flesh and The Book of Final Flesh.

== Publication history ==
James Lowder edited a series of zombie anthologies based on the All Flesh Must Be Eaten game, beginning with The Book of All Flesh (2001); these were the first fictional works from Eden Studios.

== Reception ==
The book includes the story "Prometheus Unwound" by Matt Forbeck, which won the Best Short Fiction Origins Award for 2001.

== Reviews ==
- Review by Steven Sawicki (2002) in Science Fiction Chronicle, #222 March 2002
- Review by R. P. McCosker (2003) in All Hallows, October 2003
