= The Merlin Chronicles =

Short story anthology

The Merlin Chronicles is a short story collection edited by Mike Ashley published by Robinson Publishing in 1995.

== Plot summary ==
The Merlin Chronicles features twenty-two short stories about Merlin.

== Reception ==
Steve Faragher reviewed The Merlin Chronicles for Arcane magazine, rating it a 6 out of 10 overall. Faragher comments that "some of the stories are brilliant and with the option to just dip in occasionally rather than read the entire book from cover to cover, you could find yourself rewarded by this good-value book."

== Reviews ==
- Review by Jeanne Cavelos (1996) in Realms of Fantasy, February 1996
- Review by Don D'Ammassa (1996) in Science Fiction Chronicle, #190 October 1996
