= Savage Mountains =

1991 Role-playing supplement for Pendragon game

- Publishers: Chaosium
- Publication: 1991; 34 years ago
- Genres: Arthurian fantasy
- Systems: Basic Role-Playing variant

Savage Mountains is a 1991 role-playing supplement for Pendragon published by Chaosium.

== Contents ==
Savage Mountains is a supplement in which background information is provided on the city of Carlion-in-Usk as well as four adventures.

== Publication history ==
Shannon Appelcline noted that Chaosium published the third edition of Pendragon as the first edition of the game which was not a boxed set, and expanded the game to allow many different knight types: "Even more notable was Chaosium's release of The Boy King (1991), which expanded upon the earlier Pendragon Campaign by fulling detailing the first half of that 80-year campaign. That same year, Chaosium published Savage Mountains (1991), an in-depth description of Cambria and the first of numerous sourcebooks detailing the lands and peoples of Britain."

== Reception ==
Stewart Wieck reviewed Savage Mountains in White Wolf #34 (Jan./Feb., 1993), rating it a 4 out of 5 and stated that "Overall, Savage Mountains evokes the full flavor of medieval Wales, while the location, descriptions and adventures allow for great diversity in player activity. Since King Arthur seems even more at home in Cambria than in Logres, do yourself (and the Pendragon) a favor - buy this product."
