= The Merriest Knight: The Collected Arthurian Tales of Theodore Goodridge Roberts =

The Merriest Knight: The Collected Arthurian Tales of Theodore Goodridge Roberts is a 2001 book edited by Mike Ashley and published by Green Knight Publishing.

== Contents ==
The Merriest Knight is a collection of the writings of Theodore Goodridge Roberts.

== Publication history ==
Roberts began to write Arthurian fiction in the 1920s; most of these stories, though, were published in the late 1940s and early 1950s in the fiction magazine Blue Book. Roberts planned to publish them as a collection, but died in 1953 before he could do so. In 2001 Mike Ashley, editor of the Mammoth publishing group, brought them out under his Green Knight imprint.

== Reception ==
A review for SF Site called the collection's writing "polished," "erudite," and "eminently readable," but "somewhat tame": "literature for the afternoon tea and crumpets crowd – in a word 'polite' Arthurian fiction." Still, it concluded, "if you're looking for something a bit more upbeat, some Arthuriana-lite, The Merriest Knight is just the book for you."

== Reviews ==
- Black Gate
- Review by Don D'Ammassa (2002) in Science Fiction Chronicle, #223 April 2002
- Review by Paul Di Filippo (2003) in Asimov's Science Fiction, April 2003
