= Crusade (Lowder novel) =

1991 fantasy novel by James Lowder

- Cover of the first edition
- Author: James Lowder
- Language: English
- Genre: Fantasy novel
- Published: 1991
- Publication place: United States
- Media type: Print (Paperback)
- ISBN: 978-0-88038-908-2
- Preceded by: Dragonwall

Crusade is a fantasy novel by James Lowder, set in the world of the Forgotten Realms, and based on the Dungeons & Dragons role-playing game. It is the third and final novel in "The Empires Trilogy". It was published in paperback in January 1991.

== Characters ==
- Azoun IV
- Vangerdahast
- Alusair
- Torg (dwarf)
- General Vrakk (orc)
- Jad Eyesbright (Centaur)

== Pitch ==
The Tuigan army is sweeping across Faerûn. Alerted by the witches of Rashemen, King Azoun IV of Cormyr fails to convince his entourage and his allies in the magnitude of the threat. It is certain, however: Kingdoms will have to unite if they do not want to be scanned one after the other by the Tuigan horde.

== Plot summary ==
After much diplomatic negotiations and tough negotiations, Azoun finally convince his allies to mount a coalition to counter the threat of Tuigan. Against all odds, even Zhentil Keep promises to send troops. Although suspecting (rightly) rear political thoughts, Azoun accept this help and is an alliance of Cormyrians, the Dalesfolk, the Sembians, dwarf of the Foothills of the Earth and the Centaurs of forest Léthyr convinced by Princess Alusair who arrived in the region of Thesk, soon joined by Zhents forces, commanded by orcish General Vrakk.

This motley army led several battles against the horde, but both armies succeeded in taking a decisive advantage. It is only thanks to an ingenious stratagem that the coalition succeeds in isolating the Khahan and his Praetorian guard the rest of Tuigan. After a fierce battle, the Khahan is killed by Azoun in person.

The Tuigan army's private chef folds under the command of General Chanar Ong Kho, General Batu Min Ho refuses to be captured and committed suicide, joining his murdered family, while the monk Koja is presented to the king Azoun that loads to tell everything he knows about Tuigan.

== Reviews ==
- Review by Derek Vanderpool (1991) in Science Fiction Review, Summer 1991
