= Raymond H. Thompson =

Canadian academic

Raymond H. Thompson is a Canadian scholar of medieval literature specializing in King Arthur and the Matter of Britain, and in the reinterpretation of this material in modern literature. He is a professor emeritus in the Department of English at Acadia University in Canada.

Thompson completed his Ph.D. in 1969 at the University of Alberta, with the dissertation Sir Gawain and heroic tradition: a study of the influence of changing heroic ideals upon the reputation of Gawain in the medieval literature of France and Britain. At that time, he already listed his academic affiliation with Acadia University. He was Scholar Guest of Honor at the 20th Annual Mythopoeic Conference in Vancouver, 1989.

== Pendragon ==
Thompson was brought on by Chaosium in 1997 as an editor to select and package their Pendragon fiction line. However, Chaosium printed only two books before they lost the rights to the line, which Green Knight Publishing subsequently picked up.

== Books ==
Thompson's books include:

- Gordon R. Dickson: A Primary and Secondary Bibliography (G. K. Hall, 1983)
- The Return from Avalon: A Study of the Arthurian Legend in Modern Fiction (Greenwood Press, 1985)
- The Arthurian Encyclopedia (with Norris J. Lacy, Geoffrey Ashe, Sandra Ness Ihle, and Marianne E. Kalinke, Garland, 1986)
- Merlin: A Casebook (with Peter H. Goodrich, Routledge, 2003)
- Gawain: A Casebook (with Keith Busby, Routledge, 2006)
