= The Mysteries of the Faceless King =

2020 collection of short stories by Darrell Schweitzer

- Cover of first edition
- Author: Darrell Schweitzer
- Cover artist: Jason Van Hollander
- Language: English
- Series: The Best Short Fiction of Darrell Schweitzer
- Genre: Fantasy
- Publisher: PS Publishing
- Publication date: 2020
- Publication place: United Kingdom
- Media type: Print (hardcover)
- Pages: xii, 338
- ISBN: 978-1-78636-442-5
- OCLC: 1155540011
- Followed by: The Last Heretic

The Mysteries of the Faceless King: The Best Short Fiction of Darrell Schweitzer Volume I is a collection of fantasy short stories by American author Darrell Schweitzer. It was first published in hardcover by PS Publishing in April 2020 as the first of its two volume set The Best Short Fiction of Darrell Schweiter.

== Summary ==
The book contains twenty short works of fiction and a section of notes on the stories by the author, together with an introduction by Michael Swanwick.

== Contents ==
- "Introduction" (Michael Swanwick)
- "The Story of Obbok" (from Whispers no. 2, Dec. 1973)
- "A Vision of Rembathene" (from Fantasy Crossroads no. 10/11, Mar. 1977)
- "The Story of the Brown Man" (from Fantasy Crosswinds no. 1, Jan. 1977)
- "The Hag" (from Swords Against Darkness III, Mar. 1978)
- "Tom O'Bedlam's Night Out" (from Fantastic Stories v. 26, no. 3, Sep. 1977)
- "The Story of a Dadar" (from Amazing Science Fiction Stories v. 56, no. 1, Jun. 1982)
- "A Lantern Maker of Ai Hanlo" (from Amazing Stories v. 58, no. 2, Jul. 1984)
- "The Outside Man" (from Narrow Houses, Dec. 1992)
- "King Yvorian's Wager" (from Weird Tales v. 51, no. 2, win. 1989/90)
- "Transients" (from Amazing Stories v. 61, no. 5, Jan. 1987)
- "The Spirit of the Back Stairs" (from Fear no. 28, Apr. 1991)
- "The Sorcerer Evoragdou" (from The Ultimate Witch, Oct. 1993)
- "Clocks" (from The Horror Show v. 7, no. 1, spr. 1989)
- "Going to the Mountain" (from Monochrome: The Readercon Anthology, Apr. 1990)
- "Pennies from Hell" (from Night Cry v. 2, no. 3, spr. 1987)
- "Savages" (from Masques IV, Oct. 1991)
- "The Death of Falstaff" (from Shakespearean Whodunnits, Sep. 1997)
- "The Mysteries of the Faceless King" (from Weird Tales v. 50, no. 1, spr. 1988)
- "Refugees from an Imaginary Country" (from Interzone no. 116, Feb. 1997)
- "He Speaks Through Those Who Do Not Die" (new to this collection)
- "Story Notes"

== Reception ==
Michael Dirda in The Washington Post, calling the author "[o]ne of fantastika’s most energetic and versatile talents," and the set of anthologies "two princely volumes," notes that in them the Schweitzer "has finally received the kind of sumptuous career retrospective that most writers can only dream about." He characterizes the contents as "over 40 of [the author's] favorite short stories, [ranging] from the dark and Lovecraftian to the touching and oddball." From this volume he singles out "the exuberant 'Tom O’Bedlam’s Night Out'" for particular comment.

Fellow author John R. Fultz praises the release of this "two-volume hardcover collection of Schweitzer’s best work," calling him "in one respect, the fantasy world’s best kept secret ... the quality and originality of [whose] work towers far above the man himself." Fultz feels "it’s about time someone published a retrospective looking back across [the author's] long and distinguished career," saluting "PS Publishing for recognizing [his] greatness while he’s still around to see it." Noting the stories included were "chosen by Darrell himself," Fultz predicts "[h]is hardcore fans will snap up these ... immediately," and hopes they result in "a whole new legion of fans." screaming and clawing from one of the world’s greatest imaginations." Of the He calls author "an acknowledged master of the short-story form" with "one of the world's greatest imaginations," and "a quick sense of humor" one "might never guess from reading his darkest works," notably expressed "in stories such as his Tom O'Bedlam tales, which read like Terry Gilliam directing the Three Stooges on acid." He calls "Mysteries of the Faceless King," after which the first volume is named, "the tale that made me an instant Schweitzer fan." Fultz also expresses appreciation for the cover art, calling it a "[g]reat example of Van Hollander’s phantasmagorical style,[and] a perfect match for Darrell’s weird prose."
