= Tantras (module) =

Dungeons & Dragons adventure module

- Code: FRE2
- Authors: Ed Greenwood
- First published: 1989

Tantras is an adventure module published in 1989 for the Dungeons & Dragons fantasy role-playing game. It is the second of the three-part Avatar series, the first being Shadowdale and the third Waterdeep.

== Plot summary ==
Tantras is a Forgotten Realms scenario in which the player characters have been accused of murdering Elminster, so they must break out of prison and journey to the city of Tantras.

== Publication history ==
FRE2 Tantras was written by Ed Greenwood and published by TSR in 1989 as a 48-page booklet with a three pane outer folder. Also included are two fold-out color maps.
