= Green Knight Publishing =

Green Knight Publishing was founded by Peter Corless in 1998. He had acquired the rights to Chaosium's award-winning Pendragon role-playing game after they defaulted on a loan from Corless with Pendragon as collateral. From 1999 to 2001, Green Knight published supplements for the role-playing game, in which players take on the roles of knights and ladies performing chivalric deeds in Arthurian Britain. Under the direction of executive editor James Lowder and consulting editor Raymond H. Thompson, Green Knight also continued the Pendragon fiction series, which offered reprints of "lost" classics of Arthurian fiction, as well as original novels and anthologies. The company sold the rights to the Pendragon RPG to White Wolf, Inc. in 2004.

== Green Knight RPG releases ==
- King Arthur Pendragon, 4th edition (GK2716, 1999). Written by Greg Stafford with Sam Shirley. Reprint of Chaosium's CHA2716, 1993.
- Lordly Domains (GK2719, 1999). Written by James R. Palmer, Greg Stafford, Michael Trout, Mark Angeli, Ben Chessell, Judy Routt, and Liam Routt. Reprint of Chaosium's CHA2719, 1997.
- Tales of Chivalry and Romance (GK2720, 1999). Written by Shannon Appel, William G. Filios, Geoff Gillan, Heidi Kaye, and Eric Rowe.
- Tales of Magic and Miracles (GK2721, 1999). Written by Shannon Appel, Danny Bourne, Garry Fay, and William G. Filios.
- Saxons (GK2722, 2000). Written by Roderick Robertson.
- Tales of Mystic Tournaments (GK2723, 2000). Written by Larry DiTillio, Les Brooks, Sam Shirley, Greg Stafford, and Matt DeForrest.
- Book of Knights (GK2724, 2000). Written by Peter Corless.
- Tales of the Spectre Kings (GK2724 on cover; GK2714 on copyright page, 2001). Written by Peter Corless, Mike Manolakes, Mike Dawson, Garry Fay, Sam Shirley, and Martin Bourne.
