= The Chronicles of the Holy Grail =

The Chronicles of the Holy Grail is a 1996 novel written by Mike Ashley.

== Plot summary ==
The Chronicles of the Holy Grail is a novel in which an anthology of mythic tales centers on Grail lore. One story is Lady Charlotte Guest's translation of "The Story of Peredur", an early precursor to the Percivale legend, which combines archaic language, action, and Arthurian chivalry. Also included are "The Legend of Sir Dinar" by Arthur Quiller-Couch and "Peronnik the Fool" by George More—both short, older works. Ashley’s introduction offers a framing of the Grail's evolution through legend, and a bibliography supports further research.

== Reception ==
Gideon Kibblewhite reviewed The Chronicles of the Holy Grail for Arcane magazine, rating it a 7 out of 10 overall, and stated that "None of the modern writers can match the tone or feel of these older tales but, all experts to varying degrees, together they give much flesh and historical detail to the Arthurian world. There is also an excellent introduction from editor Mike Ashley, which tries to put the legend of the grail into its historical context; and also a bibliography which could be extremely useful for those conscientious people prepared to do further research."

== Reviews ==
- Review by Chris Gilmore (1997) in Interzone, February 1997
- Review by Lisa Padol (1997) in The New York Review of Science Fiction, November 1997
