= Top Science Fiction: The Authors' Choice =

1984 anthology edited by Josh Pachter

- Dust cover of first edition, 1984
- Author: edited by Josh Pachter
- Cover artist: Graham Potts
- Language: English
- Series: Authors' Choice
- Genre: Science fiction
- Publisher: J. M. Dent
- Publication date: 1984
- Publication place: United Kingdom
- Media type: Print (hardcover)
- Pages: 340 pp.
- ISBN: 0-460-04647-0
- Preceded by: Top Crime: The Authors' Choice
- Followed by: Top Horror: The Authors' Choice

Top Science Fiction: The Authors' Choice is an anthology of science fiction short stories edited by Josh Pachter, the second in his series of "Authors' Choice" anthologies. It was first published in hardcover by J. M. Dent in July 1984, with a trade paperback edition issued by the same publisher in 1985. The book has also been published in translation in the Netherlands, Argentina, Germany and Finland.

The book collects twenty-five short stories and novelettes by as many prominent science fiction authors, with the works included all selected and introduced by their authors as representative of their best short works. The stories were originally published in the magazines Amazing, Analog, Astounding, Collier's, Destinies, Galaxy, Galileo, If, Infinity, The Magazine of Fantasy & Science Fiction, Nebula, Omni, Playboy, Rogue, Science Fiction Quarterly, TriQuarterly, and Worlds of Tomorrow, and the anthologies Epoch and The Far Side of Time. The book includes an introduction by the editor.

== Contents ==
- "Introduction" (Josh Pachter)
- "All the World's Tears" (Brian W. Aldiss)
- "The Last Question" (Isaac Asimov)
- "The Men Who Murdered Mohammed" (Alfred Bester)
- "A Small Kindness" (Ben Bova)
- "There Will Come Soft Rains" (Ray Bradbury)
- "The Totally Rich" (John Brunner)
- "Internal Combustion" (L. Sprague de Camp)
- "Hop-Friend" (Terry Carr)
- "Transit of Earth" (Arthur C. Clarke)
- "Going Under" (Jack Dann)
- "Why Johnny Can't Speed" (Alan Dean Foster)
- "Rescue Operation" (Harry Harrison)
- "Mazes" (Ursula K. Le Guin)
- "Endfray of the Ofay" (Fritz Leiber)
- "A Galaxy Called Rome" (Barry N. Malzberg)
- "The Ship Who Sang" (Anne McCaffrey)
- "The Green Marauder" (Larry Niven)
- "A Typical Day" (Doris Piserchia)
- "Day Million" (Frederik Pohl)
- "Capricorn Games" (Robert Silverberg)
- "The Engineer and the Executioner" (Brian Stableford)
- "Film Library" (A. E. van Vogt)
- "The Cosmic Express" (Jack Williamson)
- "Daisy, in the Sun" (Connie Willis)
- "In Looking-Glass Castle" (Gene Wolfe)

== Reception ==
Neil Gaiman reviewed Top Science Fiction for Imagine magazine, and stated that "25 stories selected and introduced by the authors, who range from Aldiss to Wolfe. Some good, some not-so-good, and some dire."

== Reviews ==
- Review by Peter D. Pautz (1985) in Fantasy Review, March 1985
- Review by Nik Morton (1985) in Paperback Inferno, #57
- Review by David Pringle (1985) in Interzone, #13 Autumn 1985
