= Waterdeep (module) =

Dungeons & Dragons adventure module

- Code: FRE3
- Authors: Douglas Niles
- First published: 1989

Waterdeep is an adventure module published in 1989 for the Dungeons & Dragons fantasy role-playing game. It is the last of the three-part Avatar series, the first being Shadowdale and the second Tantras.

== Plot summary ==
Waterdeep is a Forgotten Realms scenario which takes place in the city of Waterdeep, where the player characters seek to return the Tablets of Fate to the almighty god Ao in the final adventure of the FRE series.

== Publication history ==
FRE3 Waterdeep was written by Douglas Niles, with a cover by Clyde Caldwell, and was published by TSR in 1989 as a 32-page booklet with a d three pane outer folder. Also included is a fold-out color map.

== Reception ==
In the February–March 1990 edition of Games International (Issue 13), Dave Hughes criticized that the adventure "sticks rather too closely to its source, using dialogue, descriptive passages and, unforgivably, all the characters from the novel as Non-player characters." He said as a result "the players are either saved at every turn by a helpful non-player character, or simply left to die inconsequentially where luck saved the characters in the novel." He thought the adventure railroaded the players' actions, saying, "The players may well feel they are being herded from scene to scene [...] with few opportunities for ideas of their own." He also pointed out that whatever the players did, non-player characters took credit for saving the Realms at the end of the adventure. Hughes concluded by giving Waterdeep a poor rating of only 4 out of 10.
