= Lordly Domains =

Tabletop Arthurian role-playing game supplement

Land Titles, Wealth, Prey, War, Heraldry
- Cover art by Stephen King
- Designers: Mark Angeli; James Palmer; Ben Chessell; Judy Routt; Liam Routt; Greg Stafford; Michael Trout
- Illustrators: Stephen King; Elsie Fowler; Judy Routt; Mark Angeli; Gus DiZerega; Lisa Free; Elise Hurst-Fowler
- Publishers: Chaosium
- Publication: 1997; 29 years ago
- Genres: Arthurian
- Systems: Basic Role-Playing variant
- ISBN: 1-56882-050-X

Lordly Domains is a supplement published by Chaosium in 1997 for the Arthurian role-playing game Pendragon that expands on the powers and responsibilities of player characters who are noble lords.

== Contents ==
Lordly Domains is a sourcebook for players, describing what a noble player character's responsibilities and privileges would be as a lord of the land. These are generally broken into:

- Administration: Maintenance of manor houses; revenue from villages in the lord's fiefdom; costs to maintain a noble's lifestyle, sponsor tournaments, upgrade fortifications, build new churches, keep a kennel.
- Social obligations: Obligations to fellow nobles, obligations to peasants, freemen and townspeople inhabiting the lord's fiefdom.
- War: New rules covering raid, siege, and invasions; fortifications and costs

The book also contains information about tournaments, falconry, a complete calendar of yearly festivals from Twelfth Night to Christmas, and heraldry.

An adventure, "Of Allies and Enemies", pits the players against two evil knights who have taken a widow's lands near Oxford. The heroes must take over and administer the abandoned manor houses of the widow (using the rules for administration outlined in the book), and confront the evil knights.

== Publication history ==
Chaosium released the Arthurian role-playing game Pendragon in 1985, and one of the first supplements to be published was Noble's Book (1986), which explained how to own and govern land. A fifth edition of Pendragon was published in 2005, and an update and expansion of Lord's Book was released in 1997 titled Lordly Domains, a 128-page softcover book designed by Mark Angeli, James Palmer, Ben Chessell, Judy Routt, Liam Routt, Greg Stafford, and Michael Trout, with cover art by Stephen King, and interior art by Mark Angeli, Gus DiZerega, Lisa A. Free, Elise Hurst/Fowler, and Judy Routt.

The following year, Oriflam published a licensed French translation.

== Reception ==
In Issue 247 of Dragon (May 1998), Chris Pramas called this "a long overdue revision of the 2nd edition's Lord's Book ... a masterful treatment of lords and lordship [taking] the focus off the adventuring knight and shows again and again that with power comes responsibility." Pramas admitted that the portion of the book dealing with administration involved a certain amount of bookkeeping, but assured readers that "Those uninterested in such details will still find much to recommend Lordly Domains." Pramas noted that "Each section is detailed and authentic. The authors have obviously done their research into real medieval history, and it fits seamlessly into the Pendragon milieu." Pramas concluded by giving this book a rating of 5 out of 6, saying, "Lordly Domains is an excellent supplement that any Pendragon GM should seriously consider picking up. The new systems add even more depth to a game already dripping with atmosphere. The details on lordly life in the medieval era are extremely well done and would benefit GMs of nearly any fantasy RPG."

In Issue 4 of the French games magazine Backstab, Arnaud Bailly noted, ""There are the essentials, the necessary and even the superfluous to add an extra dimension to your Pendragon character; that of fief lord responsible for administering and prospering his domain ... with unparalleled precision, clarity and simplicity, [this book] develops all aspects of the life of a noble lord in the Middle Ages." Bailly pointed out, "What makes this supplement truly exceptional is that it introduces into role-playing the often forgotten notion of responsibility. The things that have traditionally been neglected in role-playing become as important as the next princess in trouble or the next dragon to fry." Bailly concluded by giving this book a rating of 9 out 10, saying, "I strongly advise you invest in this supplement, especially since it easily adapts to any medieval fantasy universe of your choice with a minimum of effort." Three issues later, Bailly reviewed the French translation of Lordly Domains titled Noblesse Obliges and commented, "The additional rules, particularly concerning the state economy and hunting, are accompanied by numerous examples and historical notes that make this supplement one of the best overviews of the medieval noble domain." Bailly found the lack of illustrations in the French translation a weak point, but nevertheless concluded by giving Noblesse Obliges a rating of 9 out of 10, saying, "Needless to say, all of this can be highly profitable for any GM in any more or less medieval universe ... and for players, it allows you to relive ALL the aspects of the life of a noble knight of the Middle Ages and envisage with enthusiasm old age and the passage of time."

== Other reviews and commentary ==
- Valkyrie #15 (1997)
- Envoyer (German) (Issue 50 - Dec 2000)
