= The Boy King (Pendragon) =

Arthurian role-playing game sourcebook

Arthur claims the throne of Britain
- Cover art by Michael Weaver
- Publishers: Chaosium
- Publication: 1991; 35 years ago
- Genres: Arthurian fantasy
- Systems: Basic Role-Playing variant

The Boy King is a sourcebook published by Chaosium in 1991 for the Arthurian role-playing game Pendragon that covers significant events during Arthur's reign.

== Contents ==
The Boy King is a supplement that can be used as a role-playing campaign. The book presents information about the years 495-531 in the Arthurian timeline. The material is divided into five periods:

- Anarchy (495–509)
- Unification (510–525)
- Consolidation (525–540)
- Apogee (540–555)
- Downfall (555–565)

Significant events are highlighted, as well as notable personalities, 14 short adventures and story hooks.

Additional rules for battles and sieges are outlined, and the folklore of the large Forest Sauvage is detailed.

== Publication history ==
Greg Stafford created the Arthurian role-playing game Pendragon, which was published by Chaosium in 1985. Stafford also created the supplement The Pendragon Campaign in 1985. Six years later, Stafford designed a second sourcebook for Pendragon titled The Boy King, a 136-page softcover book with cover art by Michael Weaver, and interior art by Arnie Swekel.

In his 2014 book Designers & Dragons, RPG historian Shannon Appelcline noted that Chaosium published the third edition of Pendragon as the first edition of the game that was not a boxed set, and expanded the game to allow many different knight types: "Even more notable was Chaosium's release of The Boy King (1991), which expanded upon the earlier Pendragon Campaign by fulling detailing the first half of that 80-year campaign."

The last Pendragon book published by Chaosium was a reprint in 1997 of The Boy King.

== Reception ==
In Issue 65 of the French games magazine Casus Belli, Jean Balczesak called this book "The Bible that all Pendragon players have been waiting for." Balczesak was impressed by the content, writing, "Despite a frankly ugly cover, this 136-page work is a true masterpiece. There is enough to experience dozens of adventures in the fabulous universe of the Arthurian saga." Balczesak concluded, "The Boy King is an exceptional supplement that will excite all Pendragon fans, but which also offers a wealth of information and ideas usable by all gamemasters wishing to add a more 'medieval' flavor rather than 'fantasy' to their favorite role-playing game."

Stewart Wieck reviewed The Boy King in White Wolf #28, and liked the material, but found it badly edited. Wieck also didn't like the abbreviated "notebook" style of text, noting, "it will be too much for some GMs to persevere through. It seems that the very attractive campaign aspect of Pendragon could have been put in better reach of more players." Despite this, Wieck concluded by giving this book a rating of 4 out of 5, saying. "Make no mistake, The Boy King is a campaign supplement, not a one-shot adventure. The immense scope of the book is its weakness as well as its alluring strength. The product over-extends itself, but you won't want for source material if you can filter through the format. In the end, the quality of the material, ever a Chaosium hallmark, makes this book a must-buy for players of Pendragon."

The French games magazine Backstab called this book "THE essential supplement for any Pendragon player ... This supplement goes beyond the framework of the simple campaign: it encourages you to create real family sagas, bringing not only your characters to life but also and above all the world around them. A must!"
