= Hobby Games: The 100 Best =

2007 Hobby games reference book

Hobby Games: The 100 Best is a book about hobby games edited by James Lowder and published by Green Ronin Publishing.

== Publication history ==
Shannon Appelcline stated that Green Ronin went "through a non-d20 expansion in this time period: James Lowder's '100 Best' series. There have been two entries so far: Hobby Games: The 100 Best (2007) and Family Games: The 100 Best (2010). Each included a hundred essays from industry notables describing the games that they liked best. The books [...] are even being used as textbooks at the DigiPen Institute of Technology in Redmond, Washington."

== Reception ==
Hobby Games: The 100 Best won the 2007 Origins Award for Non-Fiction Publication of the Year.

Hobby Games: The 100 Best won the 2008 Silver ENnie Awards for Best Regalia.

== Reviews ==
- Pyramid
