= James Lowder =

American writer

- Born: January 2, 1963 (age 63); Quincy, Massachusetts, U.S.
- Occupations: Novelist; editor; game designer; film critic
- Writing career
- Period: 1987–present
- Genres: Dark fantasy, Horror
- Notable works: Prince of Lies; Knight of the Black Rose; Hobby Games: The 100 Best
- Notable awards: Origins Award: 2003, 2004, 2008, 2009 Best Fiction; 2008 Best Non-fiction; ENnie Award: 2008 Best Regalia (non-fiction book); 2017 Best RPG Supplement
- Website: jameslowder.com

James Daniel Lowder (born January 2, 1963, in Quincy, Massachusetts) is an American author, anthologist, and editor, working regularly within the fantasy, dark fantasy, and horror genres, and on tabletop role-playing games and critical works exploring popular culture.

== Early life and education ==
Lowder graduated from Whitman-Hanson Regional High School in 1981 and was inducted into the high school's hall of fame in 1991. While at Whitman-Hanson, he wrote and edited for the school newspaper and yearbook, and did the same for two summers at Project Contemporary Competitiveness at Bridgewater State University. In 1985 he graduated from Marquette University with an honors BA in English and History. While at Marquette, he edited and wrote for the Marquette Journal, the school's literary magazine. After Marquette, he took graduate classes in English at the University of Illinois at Urbana–Champaign, where he also taught writing, film, and fantasy literature courses. Lowder completed a master's degree in Literary Studies from the University of Wisconsin–Milwaukee in 1999.

== Career ==
=== Novels and short fiction ===
His earliest novels were part of the Forgotten Realms and Ravenloft shared universe book lines, but beginning in the late 1990s he turned his attention more often to creator-owned projects. His novels include Prince of Lies, The Ring of Winter, and Spectre of the Black Rose (the latter with Voronica Whitney-Robinson), and his short fiction has appeared in such anthologies such as Shadows Over Baker Street, Truth Until Paradox, and Historical Hauntings. Some of his short stories have been cited in the honorable mention list of the annual Year's Best Fantasy and Horror. He was an Origins Award finalist in the Best Short Fiction category for his 2003 novella, "The Night Chicago Died", a story that featured the debut of his mystery man character, The Corpse. His novels have been translated into more than a dozen languages.

=== Prose editing and anthologies ===
As an editor, Lowder directed several best-selling book lines for TSR, Inc. in the late 1980s and early 1990s, including the Forgotten Realms, Ravenloft, and Dark Sun. Peter Corless brought Lowder over in 1999 to oversee the Pendragon fiction line for Green Knight Publishing; Lowder reprinted classic Arthurian works and starting in 2000 he also published original material including the short story collections The Doom of Camelot (2000) and Legends of the Pendragon (2002) as well as the novel Exiled from Camelot (2001). He served as executive editor for Green Knight Publishing's line of Arthurian fiction — the Pendragon fiction series — and as a consulting editor for CDS Books on their City of Heroes novels. Lowder has edited more than a dozen anthologies, with subjects ranging from King Arthur to superheroes to zombies. He has won several Origins Awards and an ENnie Award, and been shortlisted for an International Horror Guild Award for these projects. Though some of these anthologies have been published in connection with role-playing game product lines, they often contain only creator-copyrighted stories. This makes them unusual, as game publishers frequently insist on work for hire contracts for such projects.

Lowder edited a series of zombie anthologies based on the All Flesh Must Be Eaten game, beginning with The Book of All Flesh (2001); these were the first fictional works from Eden Studios. His final short story collection for the series was The Book of Final Flesh (2003). Lowder edited a 2003 short story anthology based on the Silver Age Sentinels game from Guardians of Order. He also worked on other fiction including Astounding Hero Tales (2007) for Hero Games and Worlds of their Own (2008) for Paizo Publishing. Lowder produced Hobby Games: The 100 Best (2007) and Family Games: The 100 Best (2010) for Green Ronin Publishing.

In May 2017, Chaosium appointed Lowder executive editor of their fiction line. Chaosium President Rick Meints commented on the hire: “James embodies that magic combination of wisdom and enthusiasm. Knowing his craft inside and out, he brings his advocacy and integrity to the table at every turn. Having him relaunch our fiction line is a ‘the stars are right’ moment.” Lowder had previously served as a consultant for Chaosium, helping the company and freelancers resolve payment and contract problems with past fiction projects. Lowder was eventually promoted to the position of executive editor for all of Chaosium, but ended his contract with the publisher in March 2023 to move back to "full-time freelancing as a writer, editor, and publishing consultant for books, tabletop games, comics, and transmedia projects."

=== Game design and editing ===
Lowder has designed, edited, or consulted on books for the first, second, third, and fifth editions of Dungeons & Dragons. He served as editor for the Carl Sargent B-series modules King's Festival and Queen's Harvest, edited and developed the Greyhawk module Puppets, and edited and wrote content for the early Forgotten Realms sourcebook Hall of Heroes. His other contributions to the Forgotten Realms RPG include design for Curse of the Azure Bonds and Inside Ravens Bluff, The Living City, project coordination on the three Avatar Trilogy modules, and design on The Jungles of Chult, which tied to his Realms novel The Ring of Winter. Lowder later consulted on the fifth edition product Tomb of Annihilation on the use of Artus Cimber, Aramag the dragon turtle, Ras Nsi, the city of Mezro, and other specific elements he had created for his earlier Realms fiction.

Lowder's other contributions to D&D include articles in Polyhedron and Dragon, entries in the first two volumes of the second edition Monstrous Compendium, as well as the Monstrous Compendium Spelljammer Appendix; development work on Spelljammer: AD&D Adventures in Space, and the darklord Stezen D'Polarno for the Ravenloft sourcebook Darklords. Lowder and Bruce Nesmith designed a two-round tournament featuring D'Polarno for Gen Con 1991, with Lowder creating a three-round Ravenloft tournament featuring D'Polarno, "The Return of Stezen D'Polarno (Or Portrait of the Artist as a Young Necromancer)" as the RPGA Grandmasters Event for Gen Con the following year. Lowder's other contributions to the Ravenloft RPG center around the domain of Sithicus, with sections in both the White Wolf/Arthaus releases Heroes of Light and Gazetteer Volume IV.

He has also designed or edited material for Pendragon, Prince Valiant: The Story-Telling Game, Marvel Super Heroes, GURPS, Deadlands, Mage: The Ascension, and Feng Shui. For the horror RPG Call of Cthulhu, Lowder contributed the Vanguard Club to the d20 Gamemaster's Pack and did early development and writing on the award-winning Pulp Cthulhu. Beginning in 2017, Lowder designed a linked trilogy of Call of Cthulhu scenarios tied to his Corpse prose fiction and comics cycle, running them as gamemaster at such conventions as Gen Con and Gamehole Con, sometimes for charities such as Worldbuilders.

Since joining Chaosium as executive editor, Lowder has worked extensively on licensing for all of the company's role-playing game lines, helping to oversee both the licensing of Chaosium books to partner companies and securing licenses from other IP holders for Chaosium's use.

=== Comic books and other works ===
Lowder also works in comic books. He has penned scripts for several companies, including Image, DC, Devil's Due, and Desperado. A Ravenloft comic by Lowder was in development until DC ended its relationship working with TSR in 1991; Lowder had previously handled licensing review at TSR for some of the DC titles, written text pages for the Advanced Dungeons & Dragons comic, and scripted a story for TSR Worlds Annual #1. His short work "Lost Loves", from the Moonstone Monsters: Demons anthology, was a finalist for the Bram Stoker Award in 2004 for Best Illustrated Narrative. He contributed as a writer and consulting editor to the Worlds of Dungeons & Dragons comic book series, published by Devil's Due. He became the editor for the monthly series Hack/Slash with issue #25 and continued with the series when it moved from Devil's Due to Image. His pulp hero serial "The Corpse: Orphans of the Air" ran as an occasional back-up in Hack/Slash, starting in 2011.

Lowder's critical essays and film, book, and comics reviews have appeared in such publications as Amazing Stories and Polyhedron, the latter of which featured his long-running video review column "Into the Dark" from 1991 to 1994. His essay "Scream for Your Life" appeared in the 2005 anthology King Kong is Back!, edited by David Brin, while "Infinite Mutation, Eternal Stasis" appeared in The Unauthorized X-Men, edited by Len Wein, both from BenBella Books. He penned the entry on shared worlds for The Greenwood Encyclopedia of Science Fiction and Fantasy: Themes, Works, and Wonders. Starting in 2021 with Transgressive Horror: Reflections on Scare Films that Broke the Rules, each of the first four volumes in Ghost Show Press's anthology series Everyone's Gone to the Movies contains a critical essay by Lowder.

== In the media ==
Beginning in 2010, Lowder contributed to an annual "Games to Gift" holiday segment for the show "Lake Effect" on WUWM, Milwaukee Public Radio. He appeared as himself in episode 302 ("Man Beasts") on the television series Weird or What?, discussing the history of werewolf lore and the Beast of Bray Road. Lowder also served as a puppeteer for the low budget zombie puppet musical Misfit Heights (2012). For the 2022 live action actual play series Call of Cthulhu: Bookshops of Arkham, Lowder is credited as an executive producer.

== Selected works ==
=== Novels ===
- Crusade (TSR, 1991)
- Knight of the Black Rose (TSR, 1991)
- The Ring of Winter (TSR, 1992)
- Prince of Lies (TSR, 1993)
- Name Your Nightmare (Random House Sprinter, 1995); written as J.D. Lowder.
- Spectre of the Black Rose (Wizards of the Coast, 1999); with Voronica Whitney-Robinson.

=== Short fiction ===
- "The Family Business" (in Realms of Valor, TSR, 1993)
- "The Rigor of the Game" (in Tales of Ravenloft, TSR, 1994)
- "Laughter in the Flames" (in Realms of Infamy, TSR, 1994)
- "Make 'Em Laugh" (in Truth Until Paradox, White Wolf Publishing, 1995)
- "Persistence of Vision" (in City of Darkness: Unseen, White Wolf Publishing, 1995)
- "Truth in Advertising" (in The Splendour Falls, White Wolf Publishing, 1995)
- "The Price of Freedom" (in Troll Magazine #1, December 1997)
- "The Club Rules" (in Realms of Mystery, TSR, 1998)
- "The Hollow Man" (in Shadis #52, October 1998)
- "Heresies and Superstitions" (in The Leading Edge #39, March 2000)
- "Pretender of the Faith" (in Historical Hauntings, DAW, 2001)
- "The Unquiet Dreams of Cingris the Stout" (in Gaming Frontiers #2, March 2002)
- "The Night Chicago Died" (in Pulp Zombies, Eden Studios, 2003)
- "The Weeping Masks" (in Shadows Over Baker Street, Del Rey, 2003)
- "She Dwelleth in the Cold of the Moon" (in The Repentant, DAW, 2003)
- "Fanboy" (in Path of the Bold, Guardians of Order, 2004)
- "Bandits in the Paths of Fame" (in Dragon #336, October 2005)
- "Beneath the Skin" (in Heroes in Training, DAW, 2007)
- "The Paper Shield" (in Sojourn: An Anthology of Speculative Fiction, FtB, 2014)
- "King of the Frozen Men" (in Sojourn 2: An Anthology of Speculative Fiction, FtB, 2014)
- "Morning in America" (in Delta Green: Extraordinary Renditions, Arc Dream Publishing, 2015)
- "The Shadow and the Eye" (in Ghost in the Cogs, Broken Eye, 2015)
- "Orphans of the Air" (in Peel Back the Skin, Grey Matter Press, 2016)
- "The Crooked Smile Killers" (in Genius Loci: Tales of the Spirit of Place, Ragnarok, 2016)
- "The Treachery of Bright Yesterdays" (in Tales of the Lost Citadel, Lost Citadel, 2016)
- "The Geometry of Nowhere" (in The Dagon Collection, PS Publishing, 2024)

=== Comic book scripts ===
- "Duel of Hearts" (in TSR Worlds Annual #1, DC Comics, September 1990)
- "Art for Art's Sake" (in First Night Program, city of Boston, December 1996)
- "Traitor's Gate" (in Mythography #2 & #3, Bardic Press, February and April 1997)
- "Passion Play" (in Vampire: The Masquerade: Blood and Shadows, Moonstone, November 2003)
- "Lost Loves" (in Moonstone Monsters: Demons, Moonstone, August 2004)
- "The Man Who Collected Gods" (in Negative Burn #16, Desperado, December 2007)
- "The Rigor of the Game" (in Worlds of Dungeons & Dragons #3, Devil's Due, July 2008)
- "The Corpse: Orphans of the Air" (ongoing serial, begins in Hack/Slash #6, Image, July 2011)
- "Night Funeral in Eminence" (in Hack/Slash, volume 9: Torture Prone, Image, September 2011)
- "The Case of the Killer and the Questing King" (in Hack/Slash #18, Image, October 2012)
- "Protection Racket" (in Cruel Kingdom volume 2, #2, Oni, October 2026)

=== Anthologies and art books (as editor) ===
- Realms of Valor (TSR, 1993)
- Realms of Infamy (TSR, 1994)
- The Doom of Camelot (Green Knight Publishing, 2000)
- The Book of All Flesh (Eden Studios, 2001)
- Legends of the Pendragon (Green Knight Publishing, 2002)
- The Book of More Flesh (Eden Studios, 2002)
- The Book of Final Flesh (Eden Studios, 2003)
- Path of the Just (Guardians of Order, 2003)
- Path of the Bold (Guardians of Order, 2004)
- Astounding Hero Tales (Hero Games, 2007)
- Hobby Games: The 100 Best (Green Ronin Publishing, 2007)
- Worlds of Dungeons & Dragons, Volume 1 (Devil's Due Publishing, 2008)
- Worlds of Their Own (Paizo Publishing, 2008)
- Worlds of Dungeons & Dragons, Volume 2 (Devil's Due Publishing, 2009)
- The Best of All Flesh (Elder Signs Press, 2009)
- The Art of Hack/Slash, Volume 1 (Devil's Due Publishing, 2010), with Sam Wells
- Family Games: The 100 Best (Green Ronin Publishing, 2010)
- Curse of the Full Moon: A Werewolf Anthology (Ulysses Press, 2010)
- Triumph of The Walking Dead: Robert Kirkman's Zombie Epic on Page and Screen (BenBella Books, 2011)
- Beyond the Wall: Exploring George R. R. Martin's A Song of Ice and Fire, From A Game of Thrones to A Dance with Dragons (BenBella Books, 2012)
- Madness on the Orient Express (Chaosium, 2014)
- The Munchkin Book (BenBella Books, 2016)
- Chronicles of the Demon Lord (Schwalb Entertainment, 2016), with Robert J. Schwalb
- Tales of Good Dogs (Onyx Path Publishing, 2019)
- Year of the Snake (Vigilance Press, 2026), with James Dawsey

== Awards and honors ==
- 1991 Whitman-Hanson Regional High School Alumni Hall of Fame induction
- 2001 The Doom of Camelot, Origins Award nominee, Best Long-Form Fiction
- 2003 The Book of More Flesh, International Horror Guild Award nominee, Best Anthology; Origins Award nominee, Best Long-Form Fiction
- 2004 The Book of Final Flesh, Origins Award winner, Best Long Fiction
- 2004 "The Night Chicago Died", Origins Award nominee, Best Short Fiction
- 2005 Path of the Bold, Origins Award winner, Best Fiction
- 2005 "Lost Loves", Bram Stoker Award nominee, Illustrated Narrative
- 2008 Astounding Hero Tales, Origins Award winner, Fiction Publication of the Year; ENnie Award honorable mention, Best Regalia
- 2008 Hobby Games: The 100 Best, Origins Award winner, Non-Fiction Publication of the Year; ENnie Award winner, silver, Best Regalia
- 2009 Worlds of Dungeons & Dragons, Vol. 2, Origins Award winner, Best Fiction; ENnie Award nominee, Best Regalia
- 2010 The Best of All Flesh, Origins Award nominee, Best Book; ENnie Award honorable mention, Best Regalia
- 2011 Family Games: The 100 Best, Origins Award nominee, Best Game-Related Publication
- 2017 Industry Insider/Featured Presenter, Gen Con 50
- 2017 Pulp Cthulhu, Gold ENnie Award winner, Best Supplement; Dragon Award nominee, Best Science Fiction or Fantasy Miniatures/Collectible Card/Role Playing Game
- 2023 Call of Cthulhu: Bookshops of Arkham actual play, ENnie Award nominee, best podcast
