= Astounding Hero Tales =

Fiction anthology

- Cover of first edition
- Editor: James Lowder
- Cover artist: J. Allen St. John
- Language: English
- Publisher: Hero Games
- Publication date: 2007
- Publication place: United States
- Media type: Print (paperback)
- Pages: xvi, 304
- ISBN: 1-58366-060-7

Astounding Hero Tales is a fiction anthology edited by James Lowder and published by Hero Games in March 2007.

== Contents ==
- "Death was silent" (Lester Dent)
- "The mask of Kukulcan" (Will Murray)
- "Two-fisted crookback" (Steve Melisi)
- "Wolf train west" (William Messner-Loebs)
- "Godmother" (Steve Eller)
- "Missing pages" (Richard Dansky)
- "Running thunder" (John Helfers)
- "Playback" (Patricia Lee Macomber)
- "A lost city of the jungle" (Darrell Schweitzer)
- "It came from the swamp" (Ed Greenwood)
- "Slide home" (David Niall Wilson)
- "Out west" (John Pelan)
- "Bandit gold" (Thomas M. Reid)
- "Kiss me deadly" (Robert Weinberg)
- "The forgotten man" (Robin D. Laws)
- "House of shadows" (Hugh B. Cave)

== Awards ==
Astounding Hero Tales won the 2007 Origins Award for Best Fiction Publication of the Year.

== Reception ==
The anthology was reviewed by Scott Connors in Weird Tales, March–April 2008, and Jackson Kuhl in Black Gate, Summer 2008.
