= Coquina Beach =

Beach in North Carolina, US

Coordinates: 35.8349°N 75.5584°W

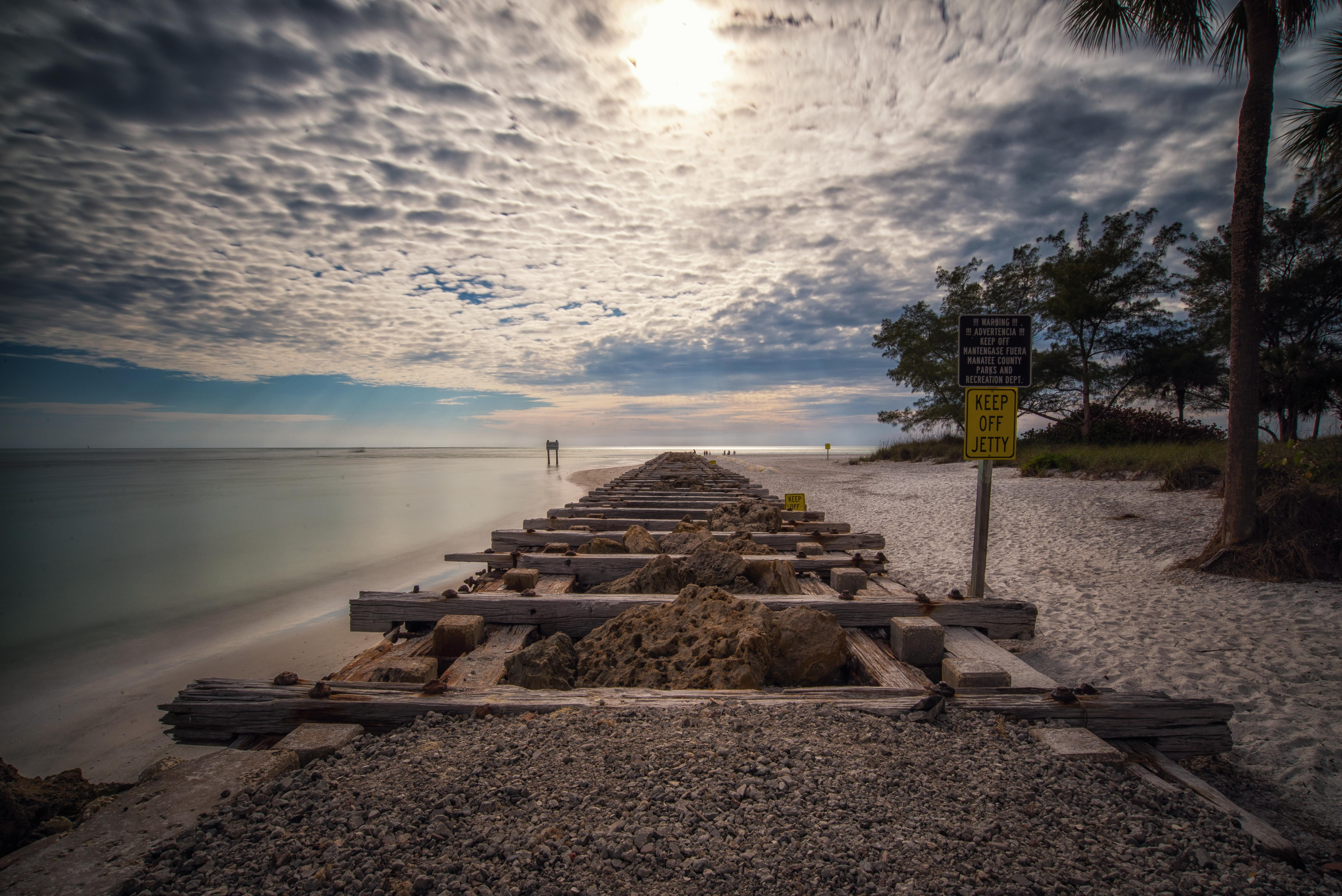
Coquina Beach Jetty

Coquina Beach is a beach in North Carolina, US, located in the Cape Hatteras National Seashore. It is located not far from the Wright Brothers National Memorial and is off highway 12 at milepost 22, 8 miles (13 km) south of Nags Head, North Carolina. Local activities include swimming, crabbing, surf fishing, surfing, shell collecting, bird and wildlife watching and sightseeing. Coquina Beach is considered by many visitors to be among the loveliest beaches in the Outer Banks. The beach is named for the tiny Coquina clams (Donax variabilis) which abound in the margin (water's edge).

== Beach Conditions ==
"Coquina is known for its miles of wave-drenched golden sands, its towering dunes, and its gracefully swaying Sea Oats". Waves are usually in the 2-6' range and suitable for beginners to advanced surfers. The beach can be enjoyed in relative peace, even in the summer the atmosphere is relatively quiet. Coquina is clean and the water is relatively clear for the East Coast. "Most days the water is blown out by SW winds, but fronts can pass and the wind turns more northwesterly after a protracted period of SW winds, making a perfectly enjoyable beach day".

== Tourism ==
Tourist activities include fishing, relaxing, surfing and sightseeing. Fishing on the Outer Banks, particularly Coquina Beach, can be on or off shore. Local fisherman can be seen casting reels and nets into the shorebreak on any given day, while boats varying in size and shape are dropping nets into the Atlantic and pulling in different species of saltwater fish. The beach is a relaxing spot to surf during the late summer and early fall. "With its historic fishing villages and some of the best surfing along the East Coast, Coquina Beach was included in the 2009 Top 10 Beaches ranking, as judged by Florida International University's Laboratory for Coastal Research".

== Shipwreck ==
The shipwreck of the Laura Barnes sailing ship is located on Coquina Beach. The Laura Barnes is representative of the many wooden sailing ships that were lost on the Outer Banks. "The four-masted schooner out of Camden, Maine was driven ashore during a nor’easter on the night of June 1, 1921". The entire crew was rescued by Coast Guardsmen from nearby Bodie Island Station and the stranded ship was stripped and sold to some locals for salvage at an auction. Some parts of the Laura Barnes went into building a house, which is a very common occurrence on the Outer Banks. Storms shifted the remaining wreckage about a mile south of the original location on Coquina Beach, across from the Bodie Island Lighthouse. There an exhibit is provided for public viewing giving additional information about the wreck.

== Commercial Fishing ==
Coquina also provides a glimpse into the rapidly vanishing commercial fishing industry. "Every day, in good weather and bad, commercial fishermen spread nets out in long lines on the hard-packed sand, checking for tears and tangles". After passing inspection, the nets are loaded onto small hand-built wooden boats, also called dorys, which fight their way through surf and drop them in calmer waters 50 to 75 feet (15 to 23 m) from the Atlantic shore. Later in the day, these same boats retrieve the ends of the nets, cruise to shore, and attach them to pickup trucks. Local businesses rely on commercial fishing for fresh seafood and employment throughout the year.

== Accessibility ==
Coquina Beach is accessible by foot. Those holding a valid permit can drive on the beach or host a bonfire.
