= The Avatar Series =

Dungeons & Dragons novel series (1989–1998)

- Shadowdale (1989); Tantras (1989); Waterdeep (1989); Prince of Lies (1993); Crucible (1998)
- Author: Richard Awlinson (pen-name for Scott Ciencin and Troy Denning), James Lowder
- Cover artist: Jeff Easley, Clyde Caldwell, Brom, Alan Pollack
- Country: United States
- Language: English
- Genre: Fantasy
- Publisher: TSR
- Published: April 1989 – February 1998
- Media type: Print (Paperback)
- No. of books: 5

The Avatar Series, originally The Avatar Trilogy, is a series of Dungeons & Dragons fantasy novels in the Forgotten Realms setting, covering the event known as the Time of Troubles.

The books were:

1. Shadowdale by Scott Ciencin—originally under the pen-name 'Richard Awlinson' (April 1989)
2. Tantras by Scott Ciencin—originally under the pen-name 'Richard Awlinson' (June 1989)
3. Waterdeep by Troy Denning—originally under the pen-name 'Richard Awlinson' (August 1989)
4. Prince of Lies by James Lowder (August 1993)
5. Crucible: The Trial of Cyric the Mad by Troy Denning (February 1998)

== Novels ==
The original covers of the novels were painted by Jeff Easley (Shadowdale), Clyde Caldwell (Tantras and Waterdeep), Brom (Prince of Lies), and Alan Pollack (Crucible).

The first three works center on the remaining members of the "Company of the Lynx" and the search for the Tablets of Fate, divine tablets that hold a listing of the Gods and their roles in the balance of Law and Chaos, during the Time of Troubles. The theft of these tablets was the actual cause of the Time of Troubles as all the gods with the exception of Helm were cast to Toril and faiths and magic ran wild.

The Company of the Lynx, as it was, consisted of Kelemvor Lyonsbane, Adon of Sune, Midnight (whose true name was Ariel Manx), and Cyric.

The last two books in the series account for what occurred after the Tablets were returned to Ao, including the aftermath of the ascension of several Company members to godhood (Midnight took the mantle of Mystra, Kelemvor became god of the dead, and Cyric took several vile deities' portfolios and went mad).

== Role-playing modules ==
The original trilogy had its counterpart AD&D adventure modules, even though these three adventures did not aim to be a precise retelling of the novels and could also be played individually instead of in sequence. These were written by Ed Greenwood, the original creator of the Forgotten Realms line. The published adventures were:

1. Shadowdale
2. Tantras
3. Waterdeep

The objective of this trilogy was to transition the Forgotten Realms scenario from the first to the second edition AD&D rules, much as the Fate of Istus adventure did with the Greyhawk campaign setting. To accomplish this objective, the writing of the modules and novels was being done simultaneously, supposedly to allow their publication at the same time the core rules transitioned to the second edition. The final format of the three-part adventure would be more plot-driven than those of the previously traditional dungeon crawling modules but this would end up becoming more common in published material from here onwards.

== Reception ==
The Avatar Trilogy appeared on the 2024 Game Rant "31 Best Dungeons & Dragons Novels, Ranked" list at #25.
