= Noble's Book =

Arthurian tabletop role-playing game supplement

- Designers: Greg Stafford
- Publishers: Chaosium
- Publication: 1985; 41 years ago
- Genres: Fantasy
- Systems: Basic Role-Playing

Noble's Book is a 1985 fantasy tabletop role-playing game supplement for Pendragon published by Chaosium.

== Contents ==
Noble's Book is a supplement for the second edition of Pendragon, and this indexed manual is intended to provide information on whatever a noble player character may encounter.

== Reception ==
Paul Cockburn reviewed Noble's Book for White Dwarf #78, and stated that "Not bad this, and worth buying – just so long as it isn't revised in a month or two ...."

J. Michael Caparula reviewed Noble's Book in Space Gamer/Fantasy Gamer No. 77. Caparula commented that "Noble's Book is a commendable work. the Castle Keep poster is a real bonus; it is the first truly historical representation I have ever seen in a game publication."

Stewart Wieck reviewed The Nobles Book in White Wolf #7 (1987), rating it a 10 out of 10 and stated that "To be honest, Pendragon is not complete without this book. It contains much needed information about owning and governing land, presents new large scale combat and glory rules, etc."
