= Shadowdale (novel) =

1989 novel by Scott Ciencin

- Cover of the first edition
- Language: English
- Genre: Fantasy novel
- Published: 1989
- Publication place: United States
- Media type: Print (Paperback)
- Followed by: Tantras

Shadowdale is the first book in The Avatar Series, written by Scott Ciencin—originally under the pen-name 'Richard Awlinson'.

== Plot summary ==
Shadowdale centers around the members of the "Company of the Lynx" and the search for the Tablets of Fate, divine tablets that hold a listing of the Gods and their roles in the balance of Law and Chaos, during the Time of Troubles. The theft of these tablets was the actual cause of the Time of Troubles as all the gods with the exception of Helm were cast to Toril and faiths and magic ran wild. The Company of the Lynx consisted of Kelemvor Lyonsbane, Adon of Sune, Midnight (whose true name was Ariel Manx), and Cyric.

== Reception ==
In the Io9 series revisiting older Dungeons & Dragons novels, Rob Bricken commented that "it feels like a real novel by a real novelist instead of a book by someone trying to be a novelist. Thus, even though I might be grading on a curve after the abysmal Greyhawk: Saga of Old City, Shadowdale rolls a 14 on the ol' 1d20."
