= Mike Ashley (writer) =

British bibliographer, writer and editor (born 1948)

- Occupations: writer, editor
- Writing career
- Genres: Science fiction, mystery, fantasy
- Notable work: The Mammoth Book of... series
- Notable awards: Edgar Award (2003); Pilgrim Award (2002); Bram Stoker Award (1995)

Michael Ashley is a British bibliographer, author and editor of science fiction, mystery, and fantasy.

Ashley has published over 100 nonfiction books and anthologies. He edits the long-running Mammoth Book series of short story anthologies, each arranged around a particular theme in mystery, fantasy, or science fiction. He has a special interest in fiction magazines and has published a multi-volume History of the Science Fiction Magazine and a study of British fiction magazines, The Age of the Storytellers.

Ashley won the Edgar Allan Poe Award for Best Critical/Biographical Work for The Mammoth Encyclopedia of Modern Crime Fiction in 2003 and the Bram Stoker Award for Best Non-Fiction for The Supernatural Index in 1995. He received the Pilgrim Award for lifetime achievement in science fiction scholarship from the Science Fiction Research Association in 2002. He was nominated for the Hugo Award for Best Related Work for Transformations: The Story of the Science Fiction Magazines from 1950 to 1970 in 2006.

In addition to the books listed below, Ashley edited and prepared for publication the novel The Enchantresses (1997) by Vera Chapman. He has contributed to The Encyclopedia of Fantasy (as contributing editor), The Encyclopedia of Science Fiction (as contributing editor of the third edition), and other reference works. He wrote the books to accompany British Library exhibitions Taking Liberties in 2008 and Out of This World: Science Fiction But Not As You Know It in 2011.

He lives in Chatham, Kent, England.

== Selected bibliography ==
=== Anthologies ===
- Souls in Metal: an Anthology of Robot Futures (1977)
- Weird Legacies (1977)
- SF Choice '77 (1977)
- The Best of British SF in 2 volumes (1977)
- Mrs. Gaskell's Tales of Mystery and Horror (1978)
- Jewels of Wonder (1981)
- Algernon Blackwood's Tales of the Supernatural (1983)
- Crypt of Cthulhu #62 (1989). Guest edited special issue dedicated to Robert A. W. Lowndes.
- Robert E. Howard's World of Heroes (1989)
- The Magic Mirror: Lost Supernatural and Mystery Stories by Algernon Blackwood (1989)
- When Spirits Talk (1990)
- The Giant Book of Myths and Legends (1995)
- Classical Stories (1996). Revised and expanded as The Giant Book of Heroic Adventure Stories (1997)
- Classical Whodunnits: Murder And Mystery from Ancient Greece And Rome (1996)
- Space Stories (1996). Published in the US as The Random House Book of Science Fiction Stories (1997)
- Fantasy Stories (1996). Published in the US as The Random House Book of Fantasy Stories (1997)
- Shakespearean Whodunnits (1997)
- Shakespearean Detectives (1998)
- Royal Whodunnits: Tales of Right, Royal Murder And Mystery (1999)
- Phantom Perfumes and Other Shades: Memories of Ghost Stories Magazine (2000)
- A Haunting Beauty (2000). Collection of stories by Charles Birkin.
- The Merriest Knight: The Collected Arthurian Tales of Theodore Goodridge Roberts (2001)
- The Mirror and Other Strange Reflections (2002). Collection of stories by Arthur Porges.
- Thing of Darkness (2006). Collection of stories by G. G. Pendarves compiled with John Pelan.
- Great American Ghost Stories (2008)
- Unforgettable Ghost Stories by Women Writers (2008)
- Dreams and Wonders: Stories from the Dawn of Modern Fantasy (August 2010, ISBN 0-486-47775-4)
- The Duel of Shadows: The Extraordinary Cases of Barnabas Hildreth (2011) by Vincent Cornier
- Steampunk: Extraordinary Tales of Victorian Futurism (July 2010)
- Fighters of Fear: Occult Detective Stories (2020)

British Library of Science Fiction Classics

- Lost Mars: Stories from the Golden Age of the Red Planet (University of Chicago Press, 2018, ISBN 978-0-226-57508-7)
- Moonrise: The Golden Age of Lunar Adventures (2018)
- Menace of the Machine: The Rise of AI in Classic Science Fiction (2019)
- Menace of the Monster: Classic Tales of Creatures from Beyond (2019)
- The End of the World: and Other Catastrophes (2019)
- The Darkest of Nights (2019)
- The Tide Went Out (2019)
- Beyond Time: Classic Tales of Time Unwound (2019)
- Yesterday's Tomorrows: The Story of Science Fiction in 100 Books (2021)
- The Society of Time: The Original Trilogy and Other Stories (2021)
- Spaceworlds: Stories of Life in the Void (2021)
- Nature's Warnings: Classic Stories of Eco-Science Fiction (2021)
- Born of the Sun: Adventures in Our Solar System (2021)

British Library Tales of the Weird

- Glimpses of the Unknown: Lost Ghost Stories (2019)
- From the Depths: And Other Strange Tales of the Sea (2019)
- The Platform Edge: Uncanny Tales of the Railways (2019)
- Doorway to Dilemma: Bewildering Tales of Dark Fantasy (2019)
- Queens of the Abyss: Lost Stories from the Women of the Weird (2020)
- The Outcast: And Other Dark Tales by E. F. Benson (2020)
- A Phantom Lover: and Other Dark Tales by Vernon Lee (2020)
- Shadows on the Wall: Dark Tales by Mary E. Wilkins Freeman (2022)
- The Ghost Slayers: Thrilling Tales of Occult Detection (2022)
- The Flaw in the Crystal: And Other Uncanny Stories by May Sinclair (2023)
- The Ways of Ghosts: And Other Dark Tales by Ambrose Bierce (2023)
- Fear in the Blood: Tales from the Dark Lineages of the Weird (2024)
- Weird Sisters: Tales from the Queens of the Pulp Era (2025)
- Danse Macabre: Strange Stories from France (2026)

Arthurian anthologies

- The Pendragon Chronicles: Heroic Fantasy from the Time of King Arthur (1990)
- The Camelot Chronicles: Heroic Adventures from the Time of King Arthur (1992)
- The Merlin Chronicles (1995)
- The Chronicles of the Holy Grail (1996). Also published as Quest for the Holy Grail (1997).
- The Chronicles of the Round Table (1997). Also published as Tales of the Round Table (1997).

The Mammoth Book of ... series

- The Mammoth Book of Short Horror Novels (1988)
- The Mammoth Book of Historical Whodunnits (1993)
- The Mammoth Book of Historical Detectives (1995)
- The Mammoth Book of Fairy Tales (1997)
- The Mammoth Book of New Sherlock Holmes Adventures (1997)
- The Mammoth Book of Comic Fantasy (1998)
- The Mammoth Book of Arthurian Legends (1998)
- The Mammoth Book of British Kings and Queens (1998) This was the US title for British Monarchs
- The Mammoth Book of Men o' War (1999)
- The Mammoth Book of Seriously Comic Fantasy (1999). Published in the US as The Mammoth Book of Comic Fantasy II
- The Mammoth Book of Sword and Honor (2000)
- The Mammoth Book of Locked Room Mysteries and Impossible Crimes (2000)
- The Mammoth Book of Awesome Comic Fantasy (2001)
- The Mammoth Book of Hearts of Oak (2001). Published in the US as The Mammoth Book of Sea Battles (2001)
- The Mammoth Book of Historical Whodunnits (Volume 2) (2001). Published in the US as The Mammoth Book of More Historical Whodunnits
- The Mammoth Book of Fantasy (2001)
- The Mammoth Book of Science Fiction (2002)
- The Mammoth Encyclopedia of Modern Crime Fiction (2002)
- The Mammoth Book of Egyptian Whodunnits (2002)
- The Mammoth Book of Roman Whodunnits (2003)
- The Mammoth Book of Roaring Twenties Whodunnits (2004)
- The Mammoth Book of Sorcerer's Tales (2004)
- The Mammoth Book of Comic Fantasy (2005)
- The Mammoth Book of New Jules Verne Adventures (2005) (with Eric Brown)
- The Mammoth Book of King Arthur (2005)
- The Mammoth Book of Historical Whodunnits: Third New Collection (2005). Published in the US as The Mammoth Book of New Historical Whodunnits (2005)
- The Mammoth Book of Comic Fantasy: Fourth All-New Collection(2005). Published in the US as The Mammoth Book of New Comic Fantasy
- The Mammoth Book of Extreme Science Fiction (2006)
- The Mammoth Book of Jacobean Whodunnits (2006)
- The Mammoth Book of Perfect Crimes and Impossible Mysteries (2006)
- The Mammoth Book of Dickensian Whodunnits (2007)
- The Mammoth Book of Extreme Fantasy (2008)
- The Mammoth Book of Mindblowing SF (2009). Notably criticised for featuring only works by white men.
- The Mammoth Book of Time Travel SF (2013)

See also The History of the Science Fiction Magazines series below.

=== Non-fiction ===
- Who's Who in Horror and Fantasy Fiction (1977)
- Fantasy Readers' Guide No. 1: The John Spencer Fantasy Publications (1979)
- The Seven Wonders of the World (1979)
- Fantasy Readers' Guide No. 2: The File on Ramsey Campbell (1980)
- The Complete Index to Astounding/Analog (1981)
- The Writings of Barrington J. Bayley (1981)
- The Illustrated Book of Science Fiction Lists (1982)
- Monthly Terrors (1985) (with Frank H. Parnell)
- Science Fiction, Fantasy and Weird Fiction Magazines (1985) (with Marshall B. Tymn)
- Algernon Blackwood: A Bio-Bibliography (1987)*
- The Work of William F. Temple (1994)
- The Supernatural Index (1995) (with William G. Contento)
- The Life and Times of King Arthur (1996)
- British Monarchs (1998). Published in the US as The Mammoth Book of British Kings and Queens. Subsequently edited and reissued as A Brief History of British Kings and Queens (2002)
- "Julius LeVallon, by Algernon Blackwood". Curiosities. F&SF. 98 (5): 162. May 2000.
- Starlight Man: The Extraordinary Life of Algernon Blackwood (2001). Published in the US as Algernon Blackwood: An Extraordinary Life.
- The Gernsback Days: The Evolution of Modern Science Fiction from 1911–1936 (2004) (with Robert A. W. Lowndes)
- The Age of the Story Tellers: British Popular Fiction Magazines 1880–1950 (2006)
- Taking Liberties (2008)
- Out of This World: Science Fiction But Not As You Know It (2011)
- "The Analog millenium". Special Feature. Analog Science Fiction and Fact. 135 (6): 76–86. June 2015.

The History of the Science Fiction Magazines series

Reprint anthologies with commentary:

- The History of the Science Fiction Magazine, Part One: 1926–1935 (1974)
- The History of the Science Fiction Magazine, Part Two: 1936–1945 (1975)
- The History of the Science Fiction Magazine, Part Three: 1946–1955 (1976)
- The History of the Science Fiction Magazine, Part Four: 1956–1965 (1978)

Later, revised and expanded as reference works (without the stories):

- The Time Machines. The Story of the Science-Fiction Pulp Magazines from the Beginning to 1950 (2000)
- Transformations. The Story of the Science Fiction Magazines from 1950 to 1970 (2005)
- Gateways to Forever. The Story of the Science-Fiction Magazines from 1970 to 1980 (2007)
- Science Fiction Rebels: The Story of the Science-Fiction Magazines from 1981 to 1990 (2016)

Smarties series

- All the Incredible Facts You Ever Need to Know (1999). Later split into two books as Wacky World (2001) and Hairy Humans (2001)
- Incredible Monsters (2000). Later split into two books as Beautiful Beasties (2001) and Deadly Dinosaurs (2001)
