= Frontier (disambiguation) =

Frontier is a geographical term referring to areas near or beyond a boundary, or of a different nature.

Frontier may also refer to:

== Places ==
=== North America ===
==== Canada ====
- Frontier, Saskatchewan, a Canadian village
- Rural Municipality of Frontier No. 19, Saskatchewan, Canada

==== United States ====
- Frontier, Michigan, an unincorporated community
- Frontier, Minnesota, an unincorporated community
- Frontier, North Dakota, a city
- Frontier, Wyoming, an unincorporated community
- American frontier, American westward expansion from 1600 to 1910
- Frontier County, Nebraska

=== Elsewhere ===
- Military Frontier, a borderland of Habsburg Monarchy with the Ottoman Empire

== Arts, entertainment, and media ==
=== Films ===
- Frontier (1935 film) (Aerograd) directed by Aleksandr Dovzhenko
- Frontier(s), a French horror film written and directed by Xavier Gens
- The Frontier (1991 film), a Chilean film directed by Ricardo Larraín
- The Frontier (2014 film), an American film directed by Matt Rabinowitz
- The Frontier (2015 film), an American film directed by Oren Shai
- Frontier (film), 2025 Spanish-Belgian co-production historical drama film
- Frontier (2018 film), Russian science fiction adventure war historical drama film about popadantsy into the World War II Eastern Front

=== Games ===
- Frontier (pinball), a pinball game manufactured by Bally
- Frontier: Elite II, a computer game written by David Braben and published by Gametek
- Frontier: First Encounters, a sequel to Frontier: Elite II

=== Literature ===
- Frontier (novel) by Can Xue
- The Frontier (novel), or Granica, a 1935 Polish novel by Zofia Nałkowska

=== Television ===
==== Series ====
- Frontier (1955 TV series), an American Western television series produced by Worthington Miner
- Frontier (1968 TV series), a British television series
- Frontier (1997 TV series), an Australian television series
- Frontier (2016 TV series), a Canadian television series
- Macross Frontier, the third Japanese anime television series set in the Macross anime series universe

==== Episodes and seasons ====
- "Dark Frontier", season 5, episodes 15 and 16 of Star Trek: Voyager
- "Digimon Frontier", season four of the Digimon: Digital Monsters anime television series

=== Other uses in arts, entertainment, and media ===
- "Frontier", a song from the album Dead Can Dance by the band Dead Can Dance
- The Frontier (website), a non-profit, multi-media platform, investigative journalism organization in Tulsa, Oklahoma
- Frontier (magazine), an Australian magazine covering the topics of science fiction and fantasy in popular culture

== Brands and enterprises ==
- Frontier Communications, a telephone company in the United States
  - Frontier West Virginia, a subsidiary of Frontier Communications above
- Frontier Developments, a British computer and video game development company
- Frontier Natural Products Co-op, a natural foods retailers' cooperative
- Frontier Records, a record label
- New Frontier Hotel and Casino, defunct hotel and casino, formerly located on the Strip in Las Vegas, Nevada

== Organizations ==
- The Frontier (Hong Kong), a political group–party that has been consolidated with the Hong Kong Democratic Party
- The Frontier (Hong Kong, 2010), a political group established by former members of the above group

== Transportation ==
=== Aeronautical ===
- Frontier Aircraft, an aircraft development company, now part of Boeing; also exists as Karem Aircraft Inc.
- Frontier Airlines (1950–1986), a former airline
- Frontier Airlines, a low-cost airline based at Denver International Airport, Colorado, United States
- Frontier Flying Service, an airline headquartered in Fairbanks, Alaska, United States

=== Other transport ===
- Nissan Frontier, a small–midsize pickup truck produced by Nissan Motors
- SS Frontier, several steamships with this name

== Other uses ==
- Frontier (horse), a thoroughbred racehorse
- Frontier, an outliner and scripting software environment
- Boundary (topology), also called a "frontier", the set of points which can be approached both from S and from outside of S in topology
- Frontier Series of Canadian banknotes issued from 2011 onwards
- Frontier Thesis, a theory about the meaning of the American frontier
- Frontier (supercomputer), a exascale-supercomputer delivered in 2022
  - Frontier TDS, a small test and development system alongside Frontier proper

== See also ==
- Borderland (disambiguation)
- Final Frontier (disambiguation)
- The Frontier (disambiguation)
- Frontiers (disambiguation)
