= The Frontier =

The Frontier can refer to:

- The Frontier (1991 film), a 1991 Chilean film directed by Ricardo P. Larrain
- The Frontier (2014 film), an American drama film by Matt Rabinowitz
- The Frontier (2015 film), an American crime film
- The Frontier (Hong Kong), a defunct political group in Hong Kong
- The Frontier (Hong Kong, 2010), a political group in Hong Kong
- The Frontier (website), an investigative news website in Oklahoma, U.S.
- The Frontier (North American history), the American frontier during the period of western expansion
- Fallout: The Frontier, a mod for Fallout: New Vegas.
- The Frontier, previous name for the New Frontier Hotel and Casino

== See also ==
- Frontier (disambiguation)
- La Frontera, Chile, the limit between the Spanish/Chilean state and Mapuche territory
