= New Frontier (disambiguation) =

New Frontier is a legislative program introduced by President John F. Kennedy in the United States in the 1960s.

New Frontier may also refer to:

== Entertainment ==
=== Literature ===
- "The New Frontier", a poem by Khalil Gibran from which President Kennedy based a famous line of his inaugural address
- Star Trek: New Frontier, set of Star Trek novels
- DC: The New Frontier, a comic book limited series

=== Film, television and video games ===
- The New Frontier (film), a 1935 film starring John Wayne
- New Frontier (film), a 1939 film also starring John Wayne
- Justice League: The New Frontier, a 2008 animated film adaptation of the DC comic book series
- New Frontier, a Sundance Film Festival venue for highlighting cinematic innovation
- "The New Frontier" (Adventure Time), a television episode
- "The New Frontier" (Fear the Walking Dead), a television episode
- The Walking Dead: A New Frontier, a video game

=== Music ===
- A New Frontier, a 1983 album by Borah Bergman
- The New Frontier (album), a 1993 album by Highway 101
- New Frontier (album), a 1963 album by The Kingston Trio
- "New Frontier" (song), a song from Donald Fagen's 1982 album The Nightfly
- New Frontier, a song from Counting Crows's 2002 album Hard Candy

== Places ==
- Xinjiang, a Chinese province directly translated as "New Frontier"
- Outer space, elliptically referred to as the new frontier
- New Frontier region of United Synagogue Youth

== Other uses ==
- New Frontiers program, an outer space program named for President Kennedy's political agenda speech
- New Frontier Party (Japan), a political party in Japan which existed from 1994 to 1997
- New Frontier Hotel and Casino, a former Las Vegas hotel and casino that existed from 1931 to 2007

== See also ==
- Frontier (disambiguation)
- Final Frontier (disambiguation)
- New Frontiers (disambiguation)
