= Borderland =

A borderland or borderlands are the geographical space or zone around a territorial border.

Borderland or borderlands may refer to:

== Places ==
- Borderland, West Virginia, an unincorporated community in Mingo County, West Virginia
- Borderland (electoral district), a provincial electoral district in Manitoba, Canada
- Borderland State Park, in Massachusetts, US
- Borderlands (United Kingdom), the Anglo-Scottish border
- Libya–Chad Borderlands, Libyan name for disputed territory between Libya and Chad
- Kresy (transl. borderlands), an area in Europe formerly part of Poland
- The translation of the name of Ukraine

== Books ==
- Borderland (magazine), a spiritualism and psychical research magazine founded and edited by William Thomas Stead
- Borderlands (novel), a 1991 children's historical novel by author Peter Carter
- Borderland (book series), urban fantasy novels and stories for teenage readers by Terri Windling
- Borderlands/La Frontera: The New Mestiza, a work on Chicana issues by Gloria E. Anzaldúa
- "Up the Country" (originally "Borderland"), an 1892 poem by Australian writer Henry Lawson
- The Borderlands series of anthologies, edited by Thomas F. Monteleone

== Film and TV ==
- Borderland (1937 film), directed by Nate Watt
- Borderland (2007 film), a horror film written and directed by Zev Berman
- Borderland (1922 film), an American silent drama film
- "Borderland" (Star Trek: Enterprise), a television episode
- "The Borderland", a 1963 episode of The Outer Limits television show
- The Borderlands (2013 film), directed by Elliot Goldner
- Borderland (television series), a 2014 television documentary series
- Borderlands (film), a 2024 adaptation of the video game franchise by Eli Roth

== Games ==
- Borderlands (board game), a 1982 board game by Eon Products
- Borderlands (RuneQuest), a 1982 fantasy role-playing game supplement
- Borderlands (series), a series of action role-playing first-person shooter video games
  - Borderlands (video game), 2009, the first game in the series

== Music ==
=== Albums ===
- Borderland (The Chevin album), 2012
- Borderland (John Mark McMillan album), 2014
- Borderland (Amorphis album), 2025
- Borderlands, a 1987 album by Kathryn Tickell

=== Songs ===
- "Borderland", a song by Mami Kawada
- "Borderland", from the Secret Chiefs album First Grand Constitution and Bylaws
- "Borderlands", a 1999 song by Jefferson Starship from Windows of Heaven

== Other uses ==
- Borderland Derby, an annual American Thoroughbred horse race
- Borderlands Books, a San Francisco independent bookstore
- Borderlands line, the railway line between Wrexham, Wales, and Bidston, Wirral, England

== See also ==
- Frontier (disambiguation)
