= Borderlands (RuneQuest) =

Fantasy tabletop role-playing game supplement

A RuneQuest Campaign in Seven Scenarios
- Box cover illustration by Lisa Free
- Designers: John E. Boyle; Yurek Chodak; Tony Fiorito; Lisa Free; Mark Harmon; Reid Hoffman; Janet Kirby; Rudy Kraft; Charlie Krank; Steve Perrin; Sandy Petersen; Ken Rolston; Greg Stafford; Lynn Willis; Elizabeth Wolcott.
- Publishers: Chaosium
- Publication: 1982; 44 years ago
- Genres: Fantasy
- Systems: Basic Role-Playing
- ISBN: 978-1-56882-516-8

Borderlands is a boxed tabletop role-playing game adventure for RuneQuest. Originally published by Chaosium in 1982, this edition was republished in 2018 in PDF format as part of Chaosium's RuneQuest: Classic Edition Kickstarter.

== Contents ==
Borderlands is a campaign of seven linked adventures for a party consisting of 4-6 moderately powerful player characters and 1-2 beginning characters. A Lunar noble, Raus de Rone, has just inherited frontier lands south of Pavis, along the River of Cradles, and hires the characters to establish a settlement and civilize the area.

The boxed set includes

- a large scale map of the campaign setting;
- a 48-page booklet for the gamemaster with general information about the area and its important personalities;
- a 32-page book of non-player characters;
- seven individually bound scenarios

The scenarios, when played in sequence, make up the complete campaign:

1. "Scouting the Land": A peaceful tour through the region, giving the players a chance to get a lay of the land and meet important personalities.
2. "Outlaw hunt": Find a group of bandits
3. "Jezrah's Rescue": Rescue the duke's daughter from Tusk Riders
4. "Revenge of Muriah": Find and destroy the source of a plague that killed the duke's wife
5. "Eye Temple": Destroy a temple of evil newtlings
6. "Condor Crag": Retrieve the egg of a giant condor from a mountain peak
7. "To Giantland!": Trade the condor's egg for a magic item in the possession of Gonn Orta, a famous giant

The final scenario then links up with the next Runequest adventure, Griffin Mountain.

== Publication history ==
Chaosium created the fantasy role-playing game RuneQuest in 1978, only 4 years after the publication of the pioneering RPG Dungeons & Dragons. In 1982, Chaosium released the adventure Borderlands to serve as an introduction to the RuneQuest world. The boxed set was created by John E. Boyle, Tony Fiorito, Mark Harmon, Janet Kirby, Rudy Kraft, Charlie Krank, Steve Perrin, Sandy Petersen, Greg Stafford, Lynn Willis, Reid Hoffman, Ken Rolston, Lisa Free, Yuri Chodak and Elizabeth Wolcott, with cover and exterior art by Free.

The youngest writer on the creative team was Reid Hoffman, who was 14 at the time.

Chaosium offered a completely remastered edition of Borderlands as a single PDF for their final PDF release of 2018.

== Reception ==
Steve List reviewed Borderlands in The Space Gamer No. 56. List commented that "This package is not inexpensive, but it's worth the price. However, the emphasis here is on the scenarios, so Borderlands is not as useful as a source book as Griffin Mountain. Unlike Griffin Mountain, though, the scenario structure provided requires virtually no scene setting by the GM before play can begin. For RQ fans, the only reason not to acquire this one is the hope of one day playing in it."

In the November 1982 edition of White Dwarf, Oliver Dickinson called Borderlands "the perfect answer to any GM who does not have time to construct a whole campaign of his/her own." Dickinson found a few minor errors and ambiguous rules, but concluded "this seems to me a splendidly organised and presented campaign."

Anders Swenson reviewed RQ Borderlands for Different Worlds magazine and stated that "RuneQuest Borderlands is a product which will appeal mainly to the enthusiastic RuneOuest players and which will be of relatively little interest to players who use other systems. The layout and printing are of very professional quality, and the radical packaging of a scenario pack in a box should be seen as a pioneering 'first' in the industry, worthy of emulation by other publishers. Its strongest point is the wealth of background material, and the weakest areas are the actual scenarios and the ungridded maps. But, scenarios are not hard to create and given the material in this pack, a totally new set of adventures could be easily conjured. This is a good buy for the GM of a RuneOuest campaign, and for all Gloranthan enthusiasts."

In the December 1982 edition of Dragon, Robert Plamondon found Borderlands to be a "well conceived and executed composition. The look and quality of the materials is top notch." Plamondon highly recommended the adventure, concluding, "Borderlands stands as a model for all subsequent campaign packages, and will be a worthwhile purchase for any gamer in terms of its utility, design, and aesthetic appeal."

In a retrospective review of Borderlands in Black Gate, John ONeill said "Borderlands is nicely self-contained, and comes with virtually everything you need for a rich adventure-packed campaign."

In his 2023 book Monsters, Aliens, and Holes in the Ground, RPG historian Stu Horvath noted, "Bordlerands is yet another entry on the list of RPG products coming in rapid succession [in the early 1980s] that provides an experience totally unlike anything else available at the time. Certainly nothing else makes room for daily life or teaches as much about the world as this box does so elegantly."
