= Claydon, Saskatchewan =

Community in Saskatchewan, Canada

Claydon
- Unincorporated community
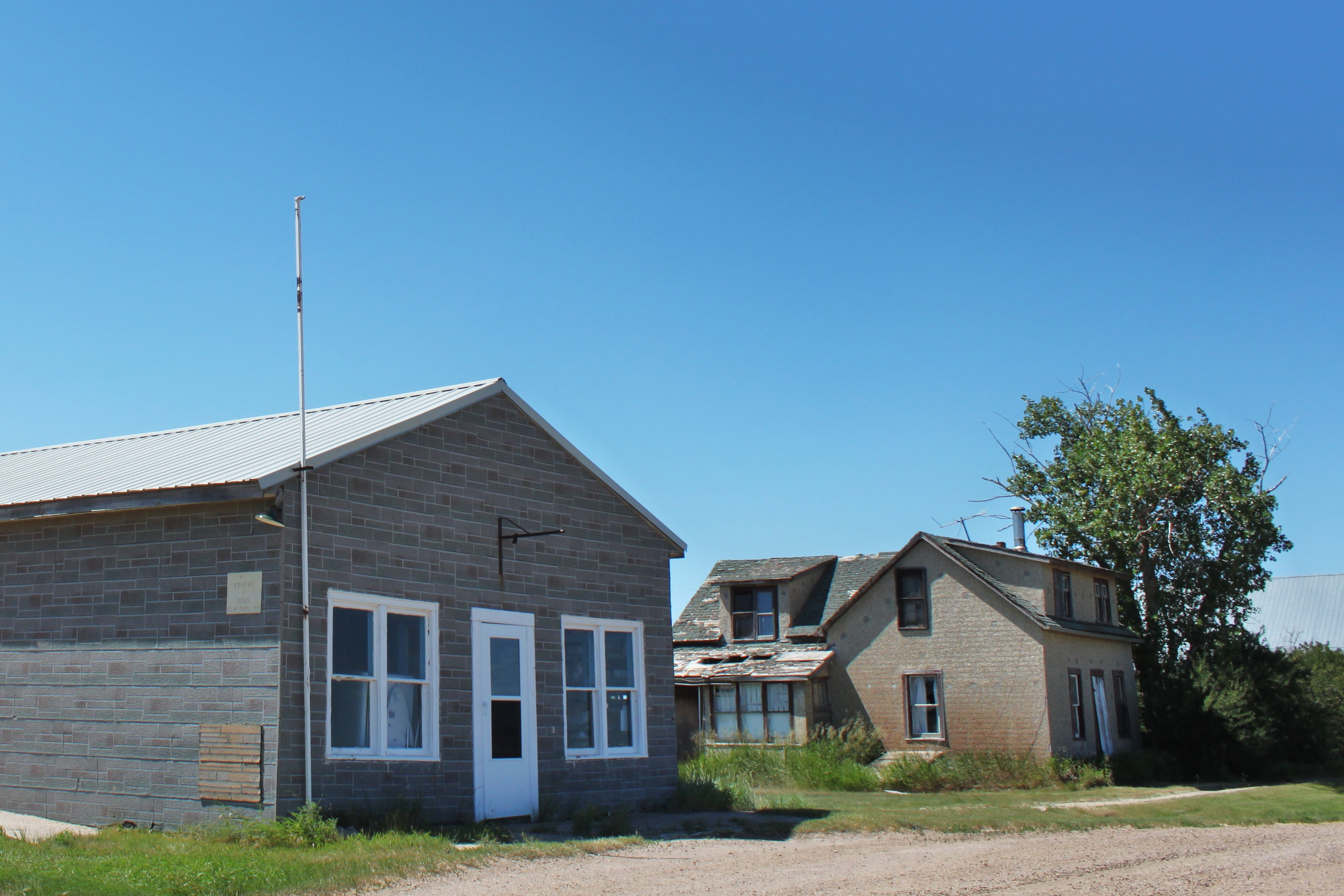
- Claydon Post Office and house, Main Street

- Location of Claydon in Saskatchewan
- Coordinates: 49°12′10″N 108°54′07″W
- Country: Canada
- Province: Saskatchewan
- Region: South West Saskatchewan
- Census division: 4
- Rural Municipality: Frontier
- Established: 1917
- Village Incorporated: N/A

Government
  - Administrator: Barb Webber
  - Governing body: Frontier No. 19

Area
  - Total: 500.488 km^{2} (193.239 sq mi)

Population (2001)
  - Total: 10
  - Density: 0.020/km^{2} (0.052/sq mi)
- Postal code: S0N 0M0
- Area code: 306
- Highways: Highway 18

Claydon is an unincorporated community within the Rural Municipality of Frontier No. 19, Saskatchewan, Canada. The community is about 60 kilometres (37 mi) southeast of the community of Robsart, 50 kilometres (31 mi) south of the town of Eastend, and 31 kilometres (19 mi) west of Frontier on Highway 18. The dark-sky preserve at Old Man on His Back Plateau is about 15 kilometres (9.3 mi) to the west.

Very little remains of the former community: only a post office that was also formerly a grocery store, a community hall, and ball diamonds.

== Education ==
Claydon no longer has a school, but those who live in or near Claydon are now bused to the neighbouring village of Frontier.

== Climate ==
Climate data for Claydon (1981-2010)
Month	Jan	Feb	Mar	Apr	May	Jun	Jul	Aug	Sep	Oct	Nov	Dec	Year
Record high °C (°F)	13 (55)	19 (66)	20.5 (68.9)	30 (86)	34 (93)	38 (100)	37.5 (99.5)	39.5 (103.1)	35.5 (95.9)	31 (88)	22 (72)	13 (55)	39.5 (103.1)
Mean daily maximum °C (°F)	−5.0 (23.0)	−2.4 (27.7)	3.7 (38.7)	12.2 (54.0)	17.8 (64.0)	22.3 (72.1)	27.0 (80.6)	26.6 (79.9)	19.5 (67.1)	12.0 (53.6)	2.0 (35.6)	−3.5 (25.7)	11.0 (51.8)
Daily mean °C (°F)	−10 (14)	−7.6 (18.3)	−1.8 (28.8)	5.4 (41.7)	10.9 (51.6)	15.5 (59.9)	19.3 (66.7)	18.7 (65.7)	12.3 (54.1)	5.5 (41.9)	−3.1 (26.4)	−8.7 (16.3)	4.7 (40.5)
Mean daily minimum °C (°F)	−15.0 (5.0)	−12.8 (9.0)	−7.3 (18.9)	−1.5 (29.3)	3.9 (39.0)	8.6 (47.5)	11.5 (52.7)	10.7 (51.3)	5.0 (41.0)	−1.0 (30.2)	−8.3 (17.1)	−13.7 (7.3)	−1.7 (28.9)
Record low °C (°F)	−39.5 (−39.1)	−39 (−38)	−31.7 (−25.1)	−22.2 (−8.0)	−8.5 (16.7)	−2.5 (27.5)	2.8 (37.0)	−2 (28)	−9.4 (15.1)	−26 (−15)	−34 (−29)	−42.5 (−44.5)	−42.5 (−44.5)
Average precipitation mm (inches)	18.1 (0.71)	12.8 (0.50)	21.5 (0.85)	25.4 (1.00)	59.2 (2.33)	69.8 (2.75)	50.3 (1.98)	35.2 (1.39)	40.9 (1.61)	17.5 (0.69)	18.2 (0.72)	16.0 (0.63)	385.0 (15.16)
Source: Environment Canada

== See also ==
- List of communities in Saskatchewan
- Lists of ghost towns in Canada
- List of ghost towns in Saskatchewan
