= Colwill =

Colwill is a surname. Notable people with the surname include:

- Chris Colwill (born 1984), American diver
- Les Colwill (born 1935), Canadian ice hockey player
- Levi Colwill (born 2003), English footballer
- Mark Colwill, English musician
- Rubin Colwill (born 2002), Welsh footballer
