= Old Man on His Back Plateau =

Plateau in Saskatchewan, Canada

Old Man On His Back Plateau
- Location within Saskatchewan Location within Canada

Highest point
- Elevation: 1,005 m (3,297 ft)
- Coordinates: 49°12′26″N 109°13′51″W

Dimensions
- Length: 12.9 km (8 mi) East-southeast

Geography
- Country: Canada
- Province: Saskatchewan
- Rural municipalities: RM of Reno No. 51; RM of Frontier No. 19
- Parent range: Missouri Coteau

Geology
- Mountain type: Morainic
- Rock type: Sandstone

Old Man On His Back Plateau is a small, oval-shaped plateau in the south-western region of the Canadian province of Saskatchewan. It is situated south of the Cypress Hills and north of the border with the U.S. state of Montana in one of the most arid places in Saskatchewan. The landscape is that of semi-arid grasslands and rolling morainic hills. It is almost 13 kilometres (8 mi) long at its widest point and has an elevation of just over 1,000 metres (3,300 ft). The plateau's name originates due to when being viewed from the north-west, it resembles the silhouette of an old fat man lying on his back with his knees drawn up.

Old Man On His Back Plateau is in the RMs of Frontier No. 19 and Reno No. 51. Access is from the Claydon Grid Road that runs 15 kilometres (9.3 mi) west from Claydon and Divide Road which runs north from Divide. Highway 18 services both Claydon and Divide.

The Nature Conservancy of Canada's Old Man on His Back Prairie and Heritage Conservation Area, founded in 1995, covers much of the plateau and surrounding grasslands. A heard of pure plains bison were introduced to the conservation area in 2003. In 2015, the site was designated a dark-sky preserve by the Royal Astronomical Society of Canada. It was the society's second such preserve and the Nature Conservancy of Canada's first.

== Old Man on His Back Prairie and Heritage Conservation Area ==
Old Man on His Back Prairie and Heritage Conservation Area is a protected area of the Nature Conservancy of Canada (NCC) that covers 5,297 hectares (13,090 acres) of the Old Man on His Back Plateau and surrounding prairie grasslands. The conservation area has a former ranch and an interpretive centre on site for tourists. It is the NCC's flagship project.

The land was previously a ranch owned by Peter and Sharon Butala. Since 1995, it has been run by the NCC, which leases the lands and fields for sustainable cattle grazing and managing pure plains bison, which were introduced in 2003. Other animals found at the site include the swift fox, burrowing owl, Sprague's pipit, and herds of pronghorn. Also found at the property are numerous medicine wheels teepee rings that were left from former Indigenous encampments.

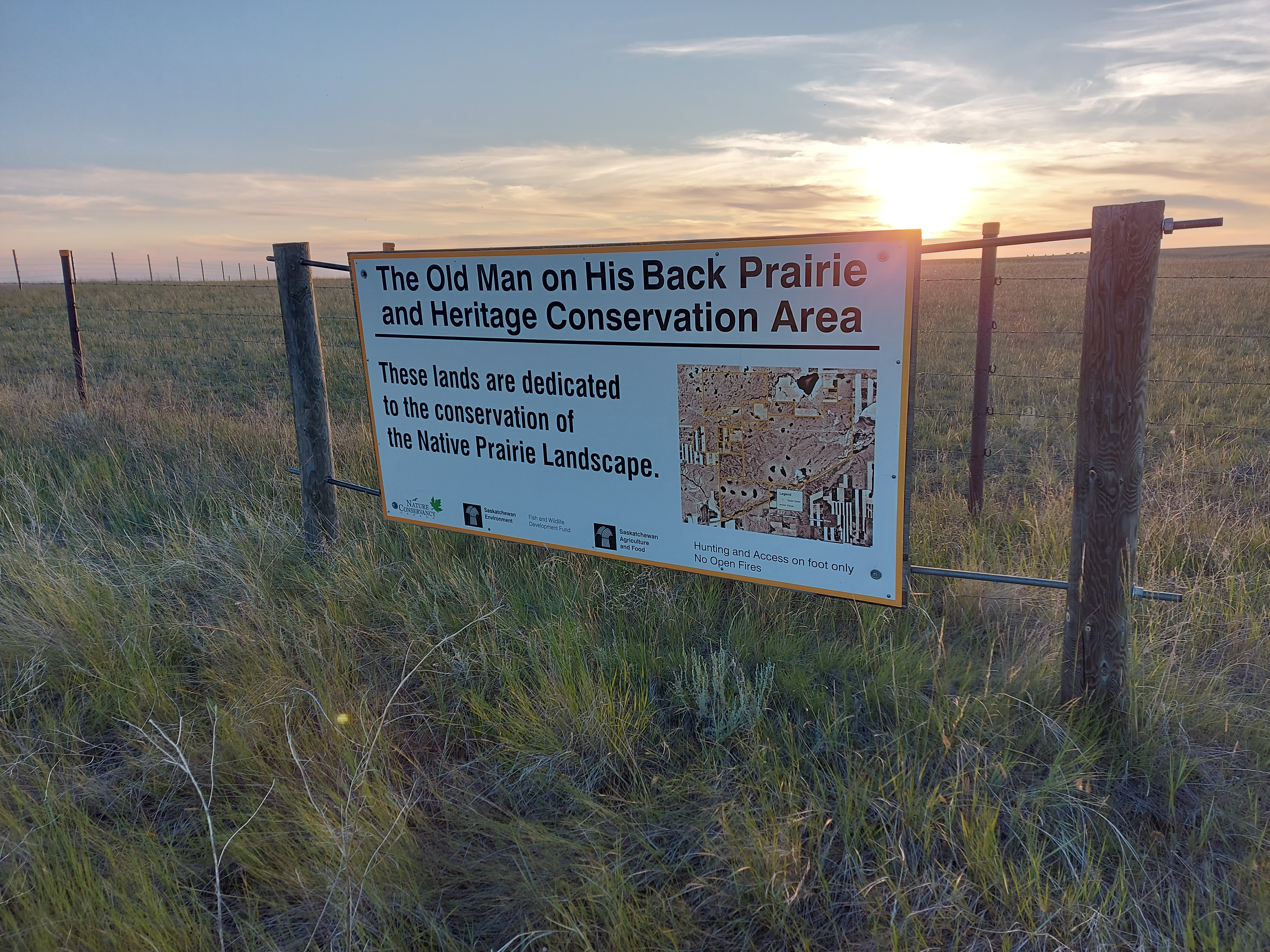
Old Man on His Back Prairie and Heritage Conservation Area

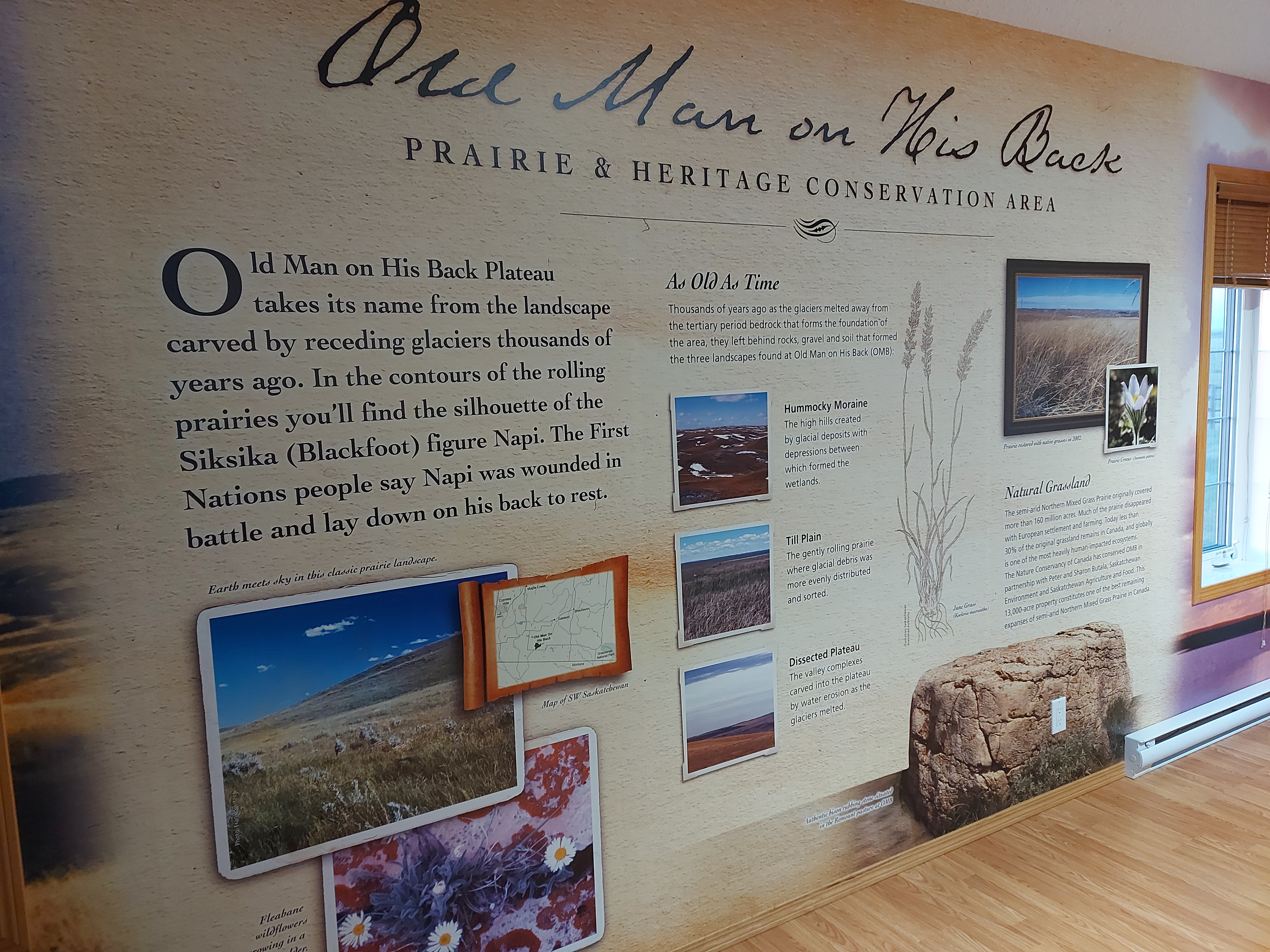
Inside the information centre at the conservation area

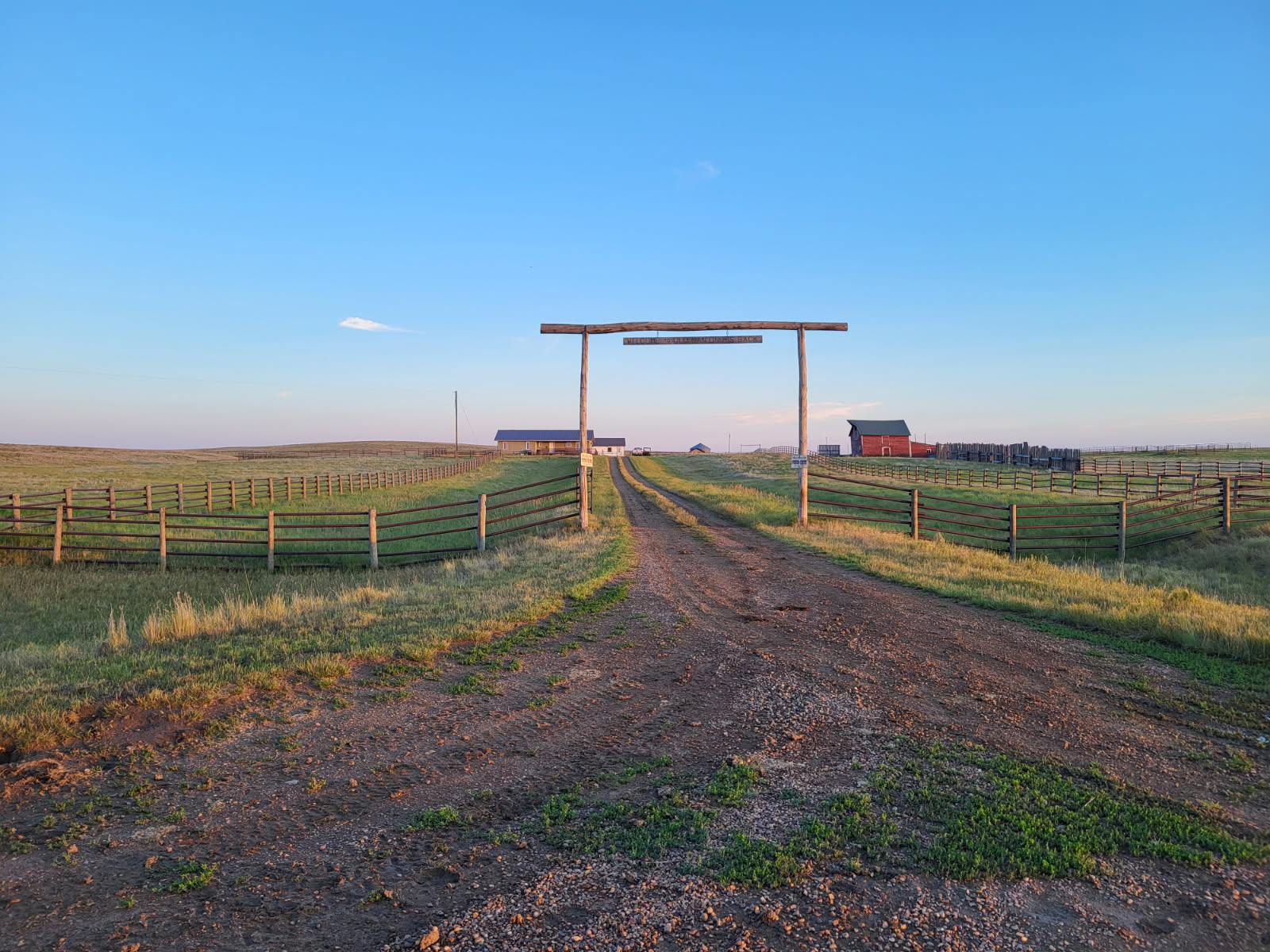
Old Man on His Back information centre

== See also ==
- List of mountains of Saskatchewan
- Geography of Saskatchewan
- List of protected areas of Saskatchewan
