= Neutrons (video game) =

1981 video game

- Publisher(s): Level-10
- Platform(s): Apple II
- Release: 1981

Neutrons is a video game for the Apple II published by Level-10 in 1981.

== Gameplay ==
Neutrons is a game in which a neutron bounces off the walls, paddles, and bumpers in the game chamber where it is released, allowing it to accumulate points.

== Reception ==
Rudy Kraft reviewed Neutrons in The Space Gamer No. 51. Kraft commented that "I cannot recommend this game under any circumstances. Even the simplest version of Pong involves more skill and is a better game."

Softalk said that "Neutrons is not a hard game to master; after an hour of playing, it should not be hard to get a score in the hundreds of thousands. The color graphics and animation are fairly standard as are the sound effects."
