= Griffin Island (RuneQuest) =

Fantasy tabletop role-playing game supplement

A Wilderness Campaign for RuneQuest
- Cover by Steve Purcell
- Designers: Rudy Kraft; Jennell Jaquays (Note: Credited as Paul Jaquays.); Greg Stafford; Sandy Petersen
- Publishers: Avalon Hill
- Publication: 1986; 40 years ago
- Genres: Fantasy
- Systems: RuneQuest
- ISBN: 978-9990400953

Griffin Island is a boxed supplement for the fantasy role-playing game RuneQuest. Originally published by Chaosium in 1981 as Griffin Mountain, a set of adventures set in the world of Glorantha, this edition was published in 1986 by The Avalon Hill Game Company as part of its third edition RuneQuest rules set, and had all references to Glorantha removed. In addition to an adventure campaign, Griffin Island contained role-playing material to help gamemasters design adventures in the setting. It received several positive reviews in game periodicals of the day.

== Contents ==
Material included in the books include background material, notes for gamemasters, various encounters, notable personalities and both short adventures and adventure hooks that can be developed into major adventures.

- a 32-page Gamemaster Book,
- a 52-page Scenario Book,
- a 28-page book of Players' Handouts,
- a 32" x 22" map of the island on which the setting takes place.

== Publication history ==
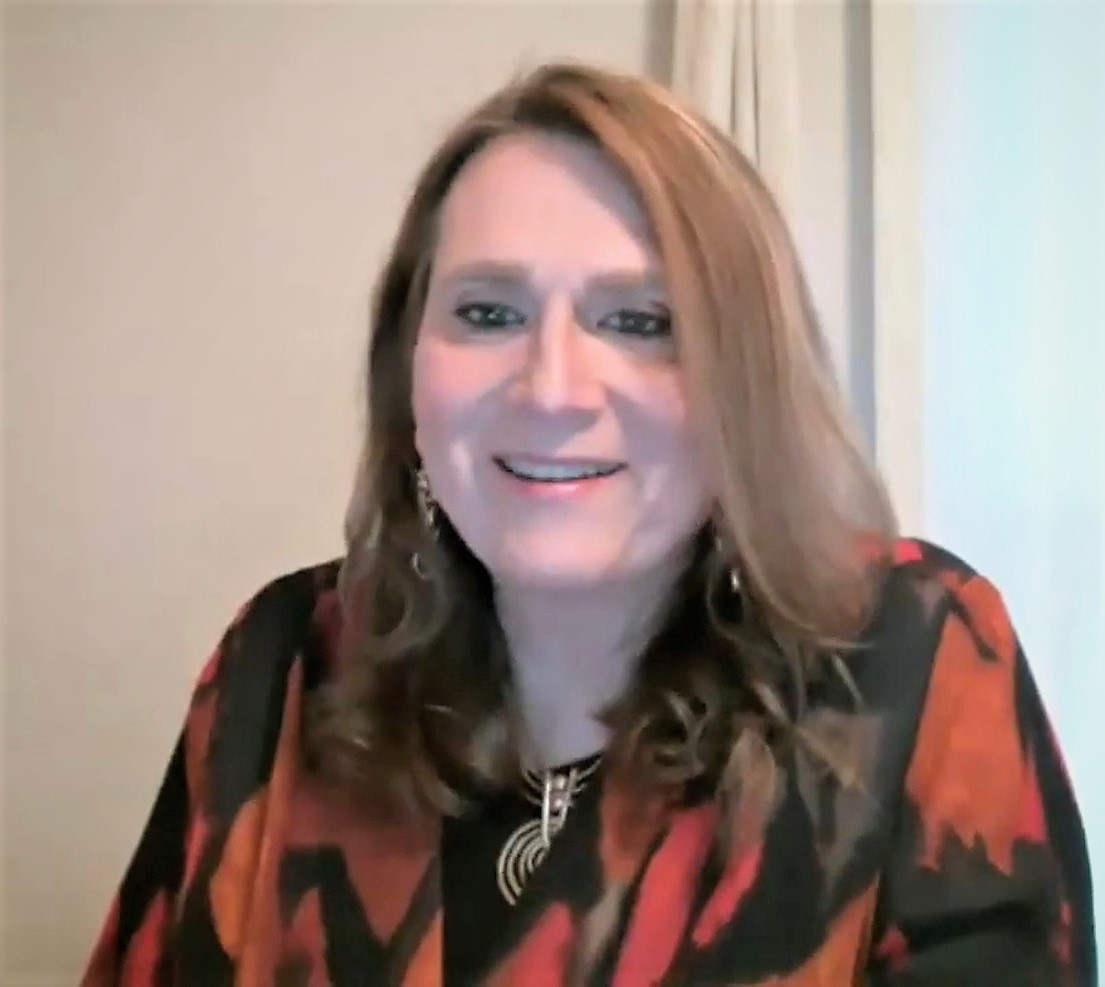
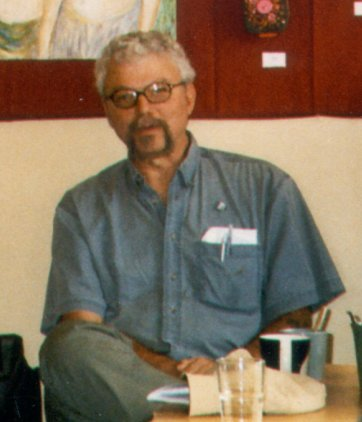
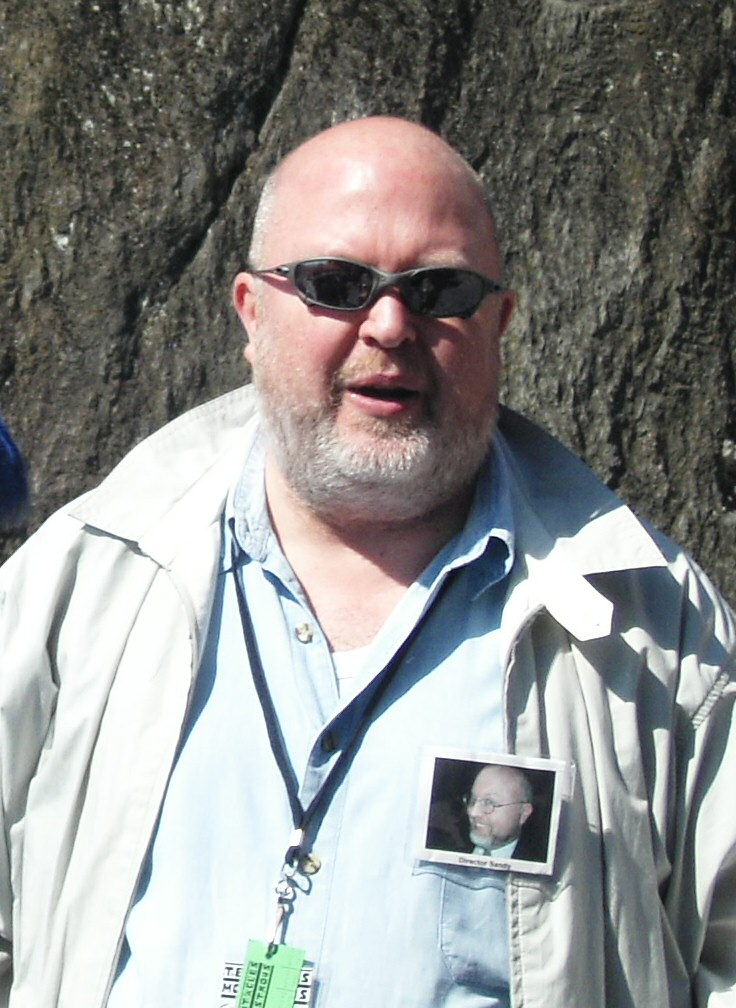
The book's designers included Jennell Jaquays, Greg Stafford and Sandy Petersen.

Chaosium originally published Runequest in 1978, and quickly followed this with a second edition the following year. In 1981, Chaosium published Griffin Mountain, a RuneQuest supplement set in Glorantha written by Rudy Kraft, Jennell Jaquays, Greg Stafford, and Sandy Petersen. In an attempt to increase distribution and marketing of Runequest, Chaosium made a deal with Avalon Hill in 1984 to publish the third edition of RuneQuest. Under the agreement, Avalon Hill took ownership of the trademark for RuneQuest, but Chaosium did not include the setting of Glorantha in the license unless the content was either created or approved by Chaosium staff. If Chaosium did not supply Glorantha material, Avalon Hill used either a generic setting called "Fantasy Earth" or and alternative fantasy setting called Gateway.

Under these conditions, Avalon Hill re-published Griffin Mountain in 1986 as a boxed set, but all references to Glorantha as well as monsters unique to Glorantha were removed; to facilitate this, the campaign setting was moved to an isolated island. The product was retitled Griffin Island and was branded with Avalon Hill's alternate fantasy "Gateway" logo. All the original authors — Kraft, Jaquays, Petersen and Stafford — worked on this new edition, with cover art provided by Steve Purcell, and interior illustrations by Jaquays.

Games Workshop re-published this edition in 1988 as a 144-page hardcover book with cover art by Angus Fieldhouse.

== Reception ==
Jean Demesse, writing in Issue 34 of Casus Belli, recommended this product as perfect for new gamemasters. Although Demesse thought the material was essentially identical to the previous Griffin Mountain, he though the new streamlined rules system of 3rd edition RuneQuest made this a more playable product. He implored old RuneQuest players to give the new system a try, saying, "Runequesters, don't go crazy: it's all good!"

In the September 1986 edition of White Dwarf (Issue #81), Robert Neville had a few quibbles, complaining about the changes made to the names of monsters and deities in order to move the material out of the world of Glorantha. He also thought the map's text should have looked more "ancient" rather that using typset text. He concluded that for those with the old Griffon Mountain supplement, this new product was not necessary. But for those who did not already own it, Neville suggested, "Griffin Island is very highly recommended to everyone who hasn't a copy of the original."

In Issue 4 of Adventurer, Tom Zunder thought that Griffin Island suffered in comparison to its predecessor, Griffin Mountain, having substantially less material. However Zunder thought Island was a good package on its own, and concluded, "a great RQ/Gateway supplement, but marred by memories of its previous incarnation. Given the quality of material here, and the wealth of material compared to the 3 AD&D scenarios the money would otherwise buy you, I cannot do anything but recommend it to all new RQ Refs and all wanting an excellent and adaptable campaign setting to explore and extrapolate from."

In the October 1987 edition of Dragon (Issue #126), Ken Rolston lamented the loss of the world of Glorantha, but admitted that "it is with resigned enthusiasm that I salute the adaptation of the Gloranthan Griffin Mountain material to more generic fantasy conventions." Rolston applauded the quality of work, saying, "The campaign background material, game-master staging notes, minor encounters, and scenarios are exceptionally well-done. For the most part, the classic setting and narrative values of the original have been preserved or enhanced." He also liked the short adventures that were included, commenting that "The best things about the scenario resources are their brevity and variety - perfect for an evening’s entertainment, easily reviewed and understood by the GM, with good maps and simple text descriptions." He concluded with a strong recommendation, saying, "The excellent presentation of the player handouts enhances the already superior quality of the campaign and adventure material, and fine presentation of the original Griffin As the only representative of a classic line of campaign supplements still is an essential part of any fantasy role-player’s library. Newcomers to Chaosium’s campaign-supplement presentation wizardry will marvel at its excellence. Old fans of the out-of-print Gloranthan supplements must resist nostalgic comparisons with the good old days and recognize Griffin Island for what it is: the best contemporary fantasy campaign supplement."

In the November 1987 edition of Space Gamer/Fantasy Gamer (Issue No. 80), Tim Robinson commented that "the game is an excellent buy if you play RuneQuest. It is useful to a GM who has a campaign established, or to the GM who wants to begin a campaign game using RuneQuest. Griffin Island has a good background, some excellent scenarios, and some new, interesting creatures. I recommend this supplement for anyone interested in some enjoyable role-playing."

In Issue 5 of The Games Machine, John Woods believed that the original Griffin Mountain supplement had been "one of the best adventure packs ever for any system", so he was pleased to see the new edition. He heartily recommended Griffin Island, saying "Anyone who wants an FRP system with both realism and playability, and which can be readily adapted and expanded to fit in with almost any fantasy world, need look no further." He concluded, "Griffin Island is a bargain, a truly first-rate scenario pack for referees who are prepared to put in a little imaginative effort."

In the September–October 1989 edition of Games International (Issue #9), John Scott admitted that he was nostalgic for the original Griffin Mountain, but he found the updated Griffin Island material as good, although he was "sorely vexed that Griffin Island is now non-Gloranthan." He concluded by giving Griffin Island an average rating of 3 out of 5, saying, "this is a good pack. Even if you still have the older pack, it might be worth checking this out."

In his 2023 book Monsters, Aliens, and Holes in the Ground, RPG historian Stu Horvath noted, "Removing the Gloranthan lore carves out the campaign's uniqueness, rendering it indistinct from other products of the period. Where Griffin Mountain feels cohesive and whole, Griffin Island feels disjointed and broken. It also takes itself a bit too seriously." Horvath concluded, "The reprint did one thing right, though ... [providing] a large, mostly blank, map of the island for the players to fill in as they explored, complete with (possibly erroneous) annotations from previous owners. It is the only exciting thing in the box."

== Awards ==
In 1986, this adventure was a finalist for an H.G. Wells Awards.

== See also ==
Other Avalon Hill RuneQuest publications
