= The Book of Treasure Maps II =

1980 role-playing game supplement

- Cover
- Genre: Role-playing game
- Publisher: Judges Guild
- Media type: Print

The Book of Treasure Maps II is a supplement for fantasy role-playing games published by Judges Guild in 1980.

== Contents ==
The Book of Treasure Maps II contains five miniscenarios, each a dungeon that the player characters are led to via treasure map. Each dungeon has a partial map for the players and a complete map for the GM.

== Publication history ==
The Book of Treasure Maps II was written by Daniel Hauffe and Rudy Kraft, and was published by Judges Guild in 1980 as a 48-page book.

TSR chose not to renew their license with Judges Guild for D&D after its September 1980 expiration, leaving The Book of Treasure Maps II (1980) and The Unknown Gods (1980) among the final products from Judges Guild to include the older D&D logo on them.

== Reception ==
Patrick Amory reviewed Book of Treasure Maps II for Different Worlds magazine and stated that "It's too bad Jaquays didn't design this one as well. As it is, it's a feeble copy of the original, with five rather boring and sparsely populated dungeons. The treasure maps to be found are not written in anyone's handwriting, but printed, lending an unrealistic feel to the package. Avoid this one and buy the first."

Lawrence Schick in his book Heroic Worlds described the second volume as "Not as good as the first volume."
