= Snakepipe Hollow =

Tabletop fantasy role-playing game supplement

- First edition cover by William Church
- Designers: Greg Stafford; Rudy Kraft
- Publishers: Chaosium; Avalon Hill
- Publication: 1979 1st edition; 1981 2nd edition; 1983 3rd edition; 1988 4th edition
- Genres: Fantasy
- Systems: Basic Role-Playing
- ISBN: 978-1568825113

Snakepipe Hollow is an adventure published by Chaosium in 1979 for the fantasy role-playing game RuneQuest, then revised and republished in various editions.

== Plot summary ==
Snakepipe Hollow is set in a section of unclaimed land in the northern part of Dragon Pass beset by many monsters. The adventure is divided into four parts:

1. A description of the region
2. Possible story hooks to bring the player characters to this region
3. The first part of the scenario
4. The climax of the scenario in the Chaos Caves.

== Publication history ==
Chaosium published the fantasy role-playing game RuneQuest in 1978, and quickly followed up with a number of supplements and adventures. One of these was Snakepipe Hollow, a 48-page softcover book with a yellow cover written by Greg Stafford and Rudy Kraft, with interior art by Luise Perenne and cover art by William Church. It was published by Chaosium in 1979.

That same year, Judges Guild published their first licensed RuneQuest adventure, Broken Tree Inn by Rudy Kraft, which used material from Snakepipe Hollow, although all references to Chaosium's setting of Glorantha were removed.

As Chaosium updated and revised RuneQuest, Snakepipe Hollow was likewise updated for the new set of rules and re-released a number of times, including a second edition in 1981 with a green cover, and a third edition in 1983 with a four-color cover.

In order to increase distribution and marketing of RuneQuest, Chaosium made a deal with Avalon Hill in 1984 to publish a third edition of the role-playing game. Avalon Hill subsequently published a fourth edition of Snakepipe Hollow in 1988, a 60-page book re-titled Snake Pipe Hollow (three separate words) with a brown cover by Steve Purcell, cartography by Caroline Schultz-Savoy, and illustrations by Taylor Overbey.

== Reception ==
In the inaugural issue of Games International, Philip A. Murphy reviewed the fourth edition of Snake Pipe Hollow published by Avalon Hill, and complimented the production values, calling the book "attractively produced." He called the adventure "something of a throwback to the late 70's, being a true dungeon hack-and-slay job" but liked its "completeness, thought provoking problems and the sheer fun of it all." However, Murphy took issue with the excessive challenge of some of the encounters, pointing out that while some of the combats were relatively easy, others would challenge even the highest level characters. Murphy pointed out that the only way to survive was for characters to intensively role-play with the local non-player characters first to garner as much information about potential encounters so that they would know when to "Run away! RUN AWAY!" For this reason, Murphy gave the adventure a poor rating of only 2 stars out of 5, reasoning that "Unfortunately, players who go in for hack-and-slay in a big way are the least likely to 'fritter away hard-earned coin on old men with grey beards using big words'..."

In his 2023 book Monsters, Aliens, and Holes in the Ground, RPG historian Stu Horvath noted that this adventure introduces new players to the mythology and history of Glorantha, saying, "Once the scenario is finished, players come away with a significant understanding of how Glorantha works and how they fit into a world where myth is real and ever-present. Snakepipe Hollow is an adventure, but it is also a teaching tool for future RuneQuest games. Few modern adventures can claim to transmit this much world lore to players while still providing a ripping fun time."
