= The Last Frontier =

The Last Frontier may refer to:

== Film ==
- The Last Frontier (1926 film), a Western by George B. Seitz
- The Last Frontier (serial), a 1932 American film serial starring Lon Chaney, Jr
- The Last Frontier (1955 film), a Western by Anthony Mann
- The Last Frontier (2020 film), a Russian war film

== Television ==
=== Episodes ===
- "The Last Frontier", Frozen Planet episode 6 (2011)
- "The Last Frontier", Gold Rush season 13, episode 15 (2023)
- "The Last Frontier", High Adventure episode 8 (1958)
- "The Last Frontier", The Protectors series 2, episode 4 (1973)
- "The Last Frontier", United Shades of America season 1, episode 7 (2016)

=== Shows ===
- The Last Frontier, a 1974 television special produced by Roger Ailes
- The Last Frontier (miniseries), a 1986 American television miniseries
- The Last Frontier (1996 TV series), an American sitcom
- The Last Frontier (2025 TV series), an American thriller drama television series

== Literature ==
- The Last Frontier, a 1923 novel by Courtney Ryley Cooper
- The Last Frontier, a 1941 novel by Howard Fast
- The Last Frontier (novel), a 1959 novel by Alistair MacLean
- The Last Frontier, a 1985 novel by Rebecca Flanders
- The Last Frontier – Australia Wide, a 1987 book by photographer Ken Duncan

== Music ==
- "The Last Frontier", a song by Redgum from Brown Rice and Kerosine
- "The Last Frontier", a song by Highway 101 from The New Frontier

== Other uses ==
- The Last Frontier, the official state nickname of Alaska
- Antarctica, at times referred to as "the last frontier"
- New Frontier Hotel and Casino, which from 1942 to 1955 was named Hotel Last Frontier
- Scientific research into the human brain is at times referred to as "the last frontier"
- Planet of the Apes: Last Frontier, a 2017 video game prelude to the film War for the Planet of the Apes

== See also ==
- Alaska: The Last Frontier, 2011 Discovery Channel TV series
- Final Frontier (disambiguation)
