= Broken Tree Inn =

Tabletop Fantasy role-playing game adventure

A RuneQuest Adventure
- Cover by Jennell Jaquays (Note: Credited as Paul Jaquays.)
- Designers: Rudy Kraft
- Publishers: Judges Guild
- Publication: 1979; 47 years ago
- Genres: Fantasy
- Systems: Basic Role-Playing

Broken Tree Inn is a 1979 fantasy tabletop role-playing game adventure for RuneQuest published by Judges Guild. It is a RuneQuest Gateway product and so not set in Glorantha.

== Plot summary ==
Broken Tree Inn contains three separate adventures that takes place in a hazardous area between The Human Empire and the non-human inhabitants of the Tall Seed Forest.

== Publication history ==
After licensing Traveller from GDW, the next license for Judges Guild with companies other than TSR was for RuneQuest from Chaosium. This production started off focused on adventures, with the first being Broken Tree Inn (1979) by Rudy Kraft, which included material that had not been used in Snake Pipe Hollow (1979) which Chaosium published, although all references to Glorantha were removed by Judges Guild before they published the adventure.

== Reception ==
Forrest Johnson reviewed Broken Tree Inn in The Space Gamer No. 30. Johnson commented that "Broken Tree Inn will work for almost any GM, but it could be a dull adventure in the hands of a novice."

On rpg.net reviewer Lev Lafayette argues that Broken Tree Inn provides "plenty of plot opportunities," but is very inefficient in its use of space resulting in "the general lack of substance for the page count." Also of note is the prurient humour with Elven character names such as "Dry Root" and "Long Stem."
