= Loomis, Saskatchewan =

Community in Saskatchewan, Canada

Loomis
- Unincorporated community
- Location within Saskatchewan Location within Canada
- Coordinates: 49.122°N 109.441°W
- Country: Canada
- Province: Saskatchewan
- Region: Southwest Saskatchewan
- Census division: 4
- Rural Municipality: Frontier
- Incorporated (Village): Never

Government
  - Administrator: Barb Webber
  - Governing body: Frontier No. 19

Population (2006)
  - Total: 2
- Time zone: CST
- Postal code: S0N 2G0
- Area code: 306
- Highways: Highway 18 / Highway 614

Loomis, also known as Echo, is an unincorporated community in Frontier Rural Municipality No. 19, Saskatchewan, Canada. The community is located on the intersection of Highway 18 and Highway 614, about 70 kilometres (43 mi) southeast of the community of Robsart and about 38 kilometres (24 mi) south of the town of Eastend.

== History ==
Loomis had a few small businesses and storefronts along the main street, with four grain elevators that have since been demolished, and a school that still stands as of today. Since the late thirties, Loomis has slowly died in population and only one family remains.

== See also ==
- List of communities in Saskatchewan
- List of ghost towns in Saskatchewan
