= Nature Conservancy of Canada =

Private organization

The Nature Conservancy of Canada
- Founded: 1962
- Purpose: Land conservation, restoration and management
- Location: Toronto, Ontario, Canada
- Region served: Canada
- Method: Conservation through property securement and long-term management and restoration of properties.
- Key people: Catherine Grenier, President & CEO; John Lounds, Past President & CEO
- Revenue: $90,201,517.00
- Employees: > 320
- Volunteers: > 2,300
- Website: www.natureconservancy.ca

The Nature Conservancy of Canada (NCC) is a private, non-profit, charitable nature conservation and restoration organisation based in Canada. Since its founding in 1962, the organization and its partners have protected 20,000,000 hectares (49,000,000 acres) of land and water across Canada, which includes the natural habitat of more than a quarter of the country’s endangered species. With offices in each province, NCC works at a local level with interested parties and partners to secure parcels of land.

== Major milestones and campaigns ==
NCC’s first conservation project was the 1,340-hectare Cavan Swamp Wildlife Area west of Peterborough, Ontario, in 1968.which hosts 22 species of orchids. The organization’s first project outside Ontario was Sight Point on Cape Breton Island, Nova Scotia, in 1971.

The organization has conserved more than 1,000 properties from coast to coast to coast, including the 5,300-hectare Old Man on His Back Prairie and Heritage Conservation Area in Saskatchewan, the 11,000-hectare Waterton Park Front in Alberta, and the 55,000-hectare Darkwoods Conservation Area in British Columbia, the largest single private conservation project in Canadian history. The Darkwoods Forest Carbon Project is NCC’s third-party certified carbon credit program.

The Natural Areas Conservation Program (NACP), launched in 2007, was a public-private partnership between the Government of Canada and NCC, along with program partners Ducks Unlimited Canada and Canada’s land trusts. Administered by NCC, the program allowed partners to match federal investment at a two-to-one ratio with contributions from foundations, corporations, individuals and other levels of government. In 2019, the NACP was succeeded by the Natural Heritage Conservation Program (NHCP), a four-year partnership with a $100 million commitment from the federal government.

In April 2022 the NCC announced its largest project to date: the Boreal Wildlands. The 145,000-hectare site consists of more than 100 freshwater lakes, rivers and streams, peatlands, swamps, and mixed forests. Located near the town of Hearst in Northern Ontario, the area is home to species of flora and fauna, including lynx, black bear, moose, and the threatened boreal caribou, as well as hundreds of species of migratory and resident birds. The carbon sequestered in the soil and trees is estimated to be equivalent to the lifetime emissions of three million cars. NCC is purchasing the land from pulp and paper manufacturer Domtar. Once completed, it will be the largest private land conservation project in Canada’s history.

Projects collaboating with indigenous goups include the Gámdis Tlagee Conservation Area in Haida Gwaii, BC, working with the Haida Nation, to the Cascumpec and Conway Sandhills projects in conjunction with L’Nuey, the Mi’kmaq Rights Initiative on PEI.

In 2014, NCC launched "Learning the Land" in partnership with several Indigenous schools to bridge the understanding between Indigenous and scientific worldviews.

== Funding and private donations ==
NCC receives funding from various levels of government, in addition to donations.

In 2020, NCC was selected as one of “Canada’s best charities” by Maclean’s magazine and in 2021 was added to Charity Intelligence’s “Top 100 Charities.”

== Photos ==
=== Tourbière-du-Lac-à-la-Tortue Nature Reserve ===
Quebec's reserve various habitats

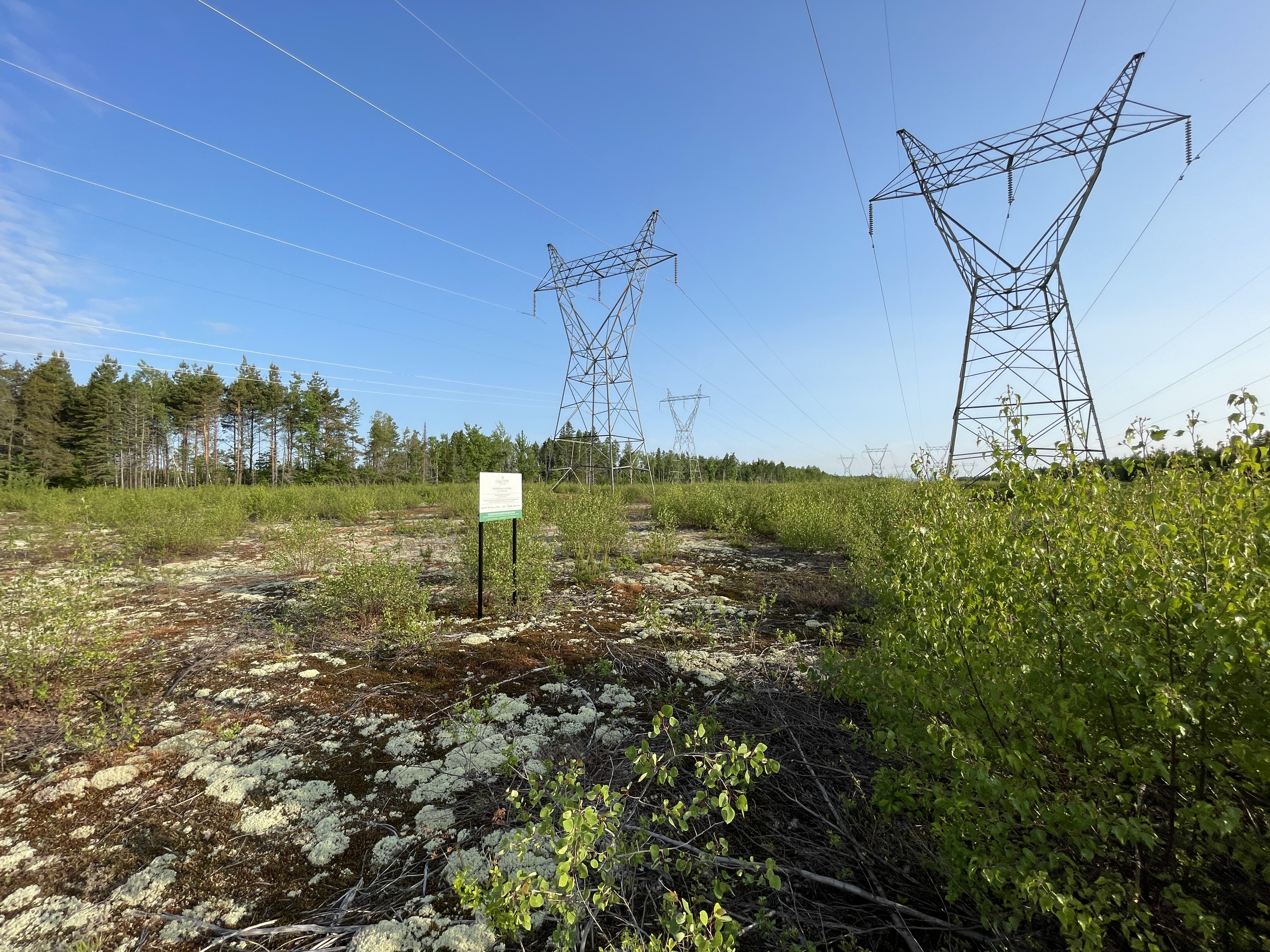
Panel (CNC), pylons and high-voltage transmission lines Hydro-Québec

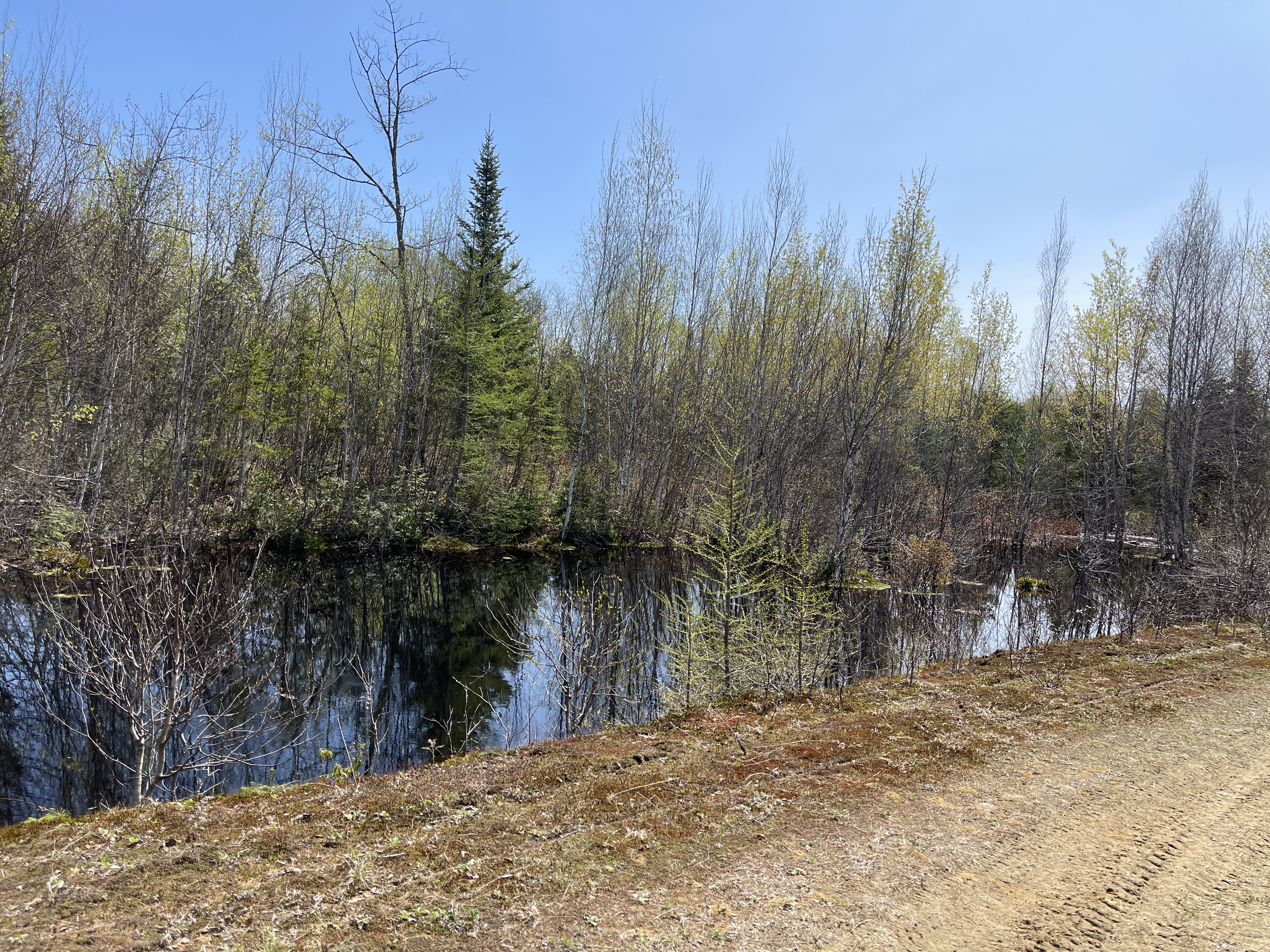
Alternation of ponds, shrub and wooded environments, Saint-Maurice

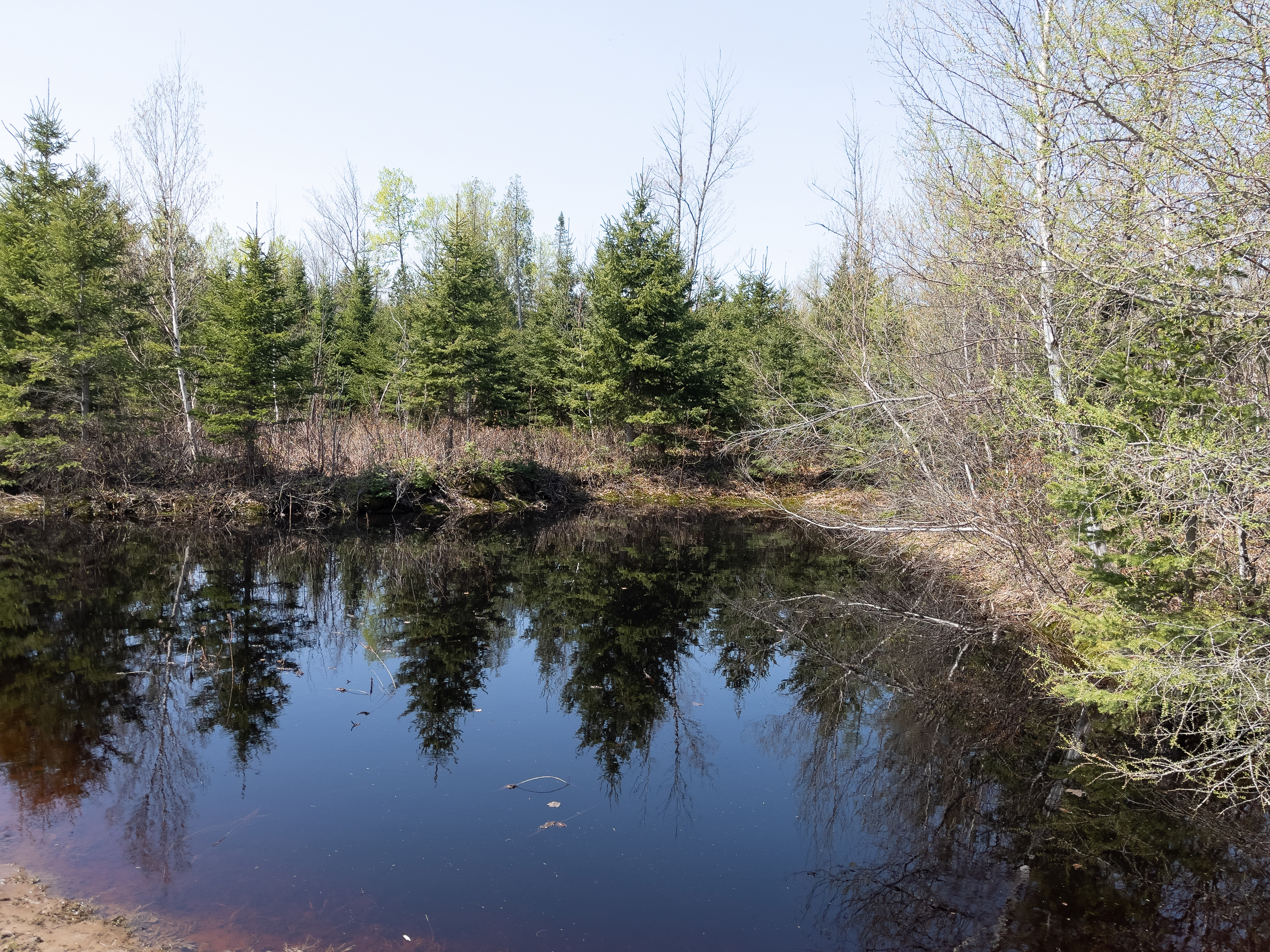
Alternation of ponds, shrub and wooded environments, Saint-Maurice

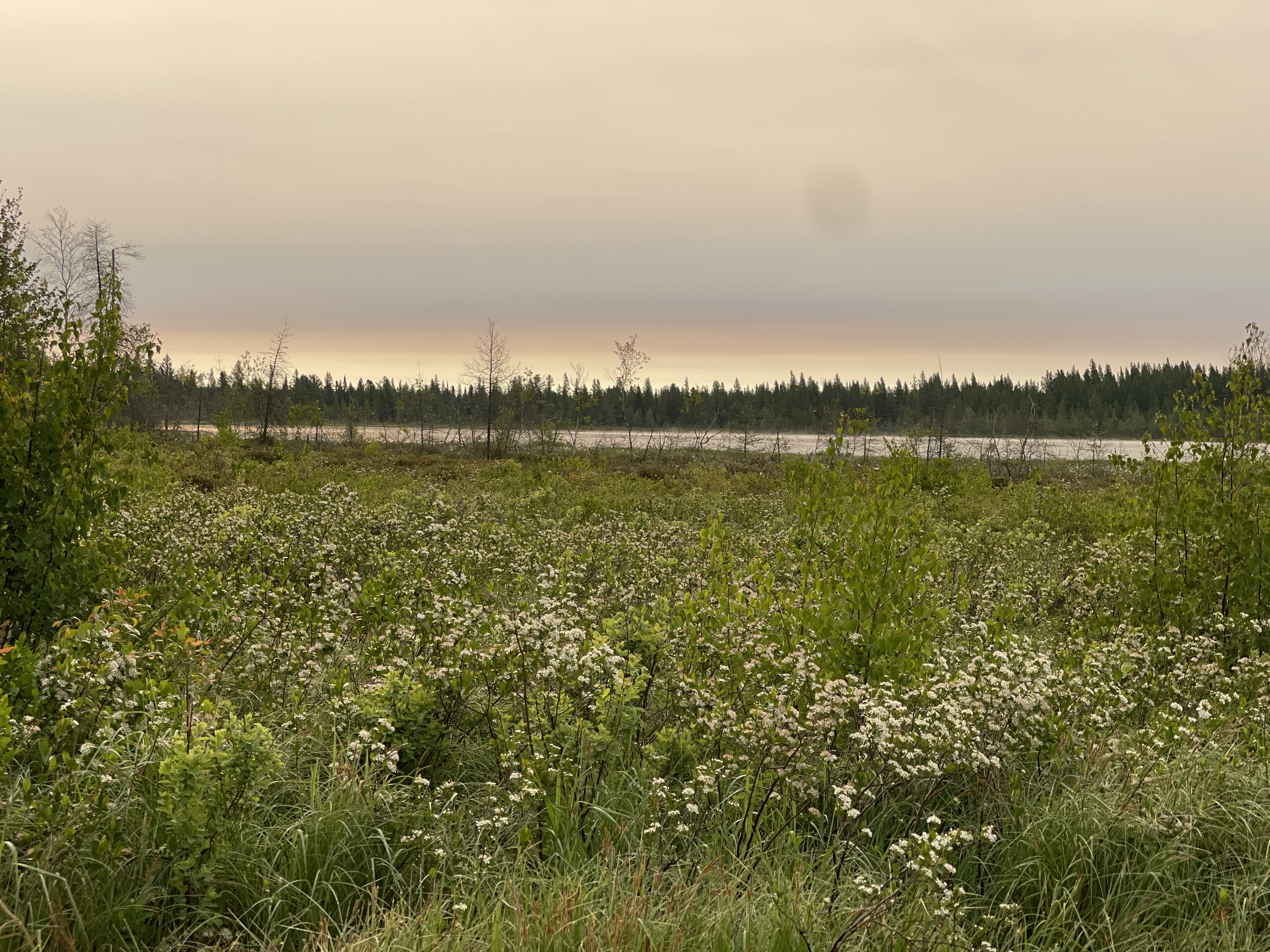
Lac Trotochaud, Notre-Dame-du-Mont-Carmel

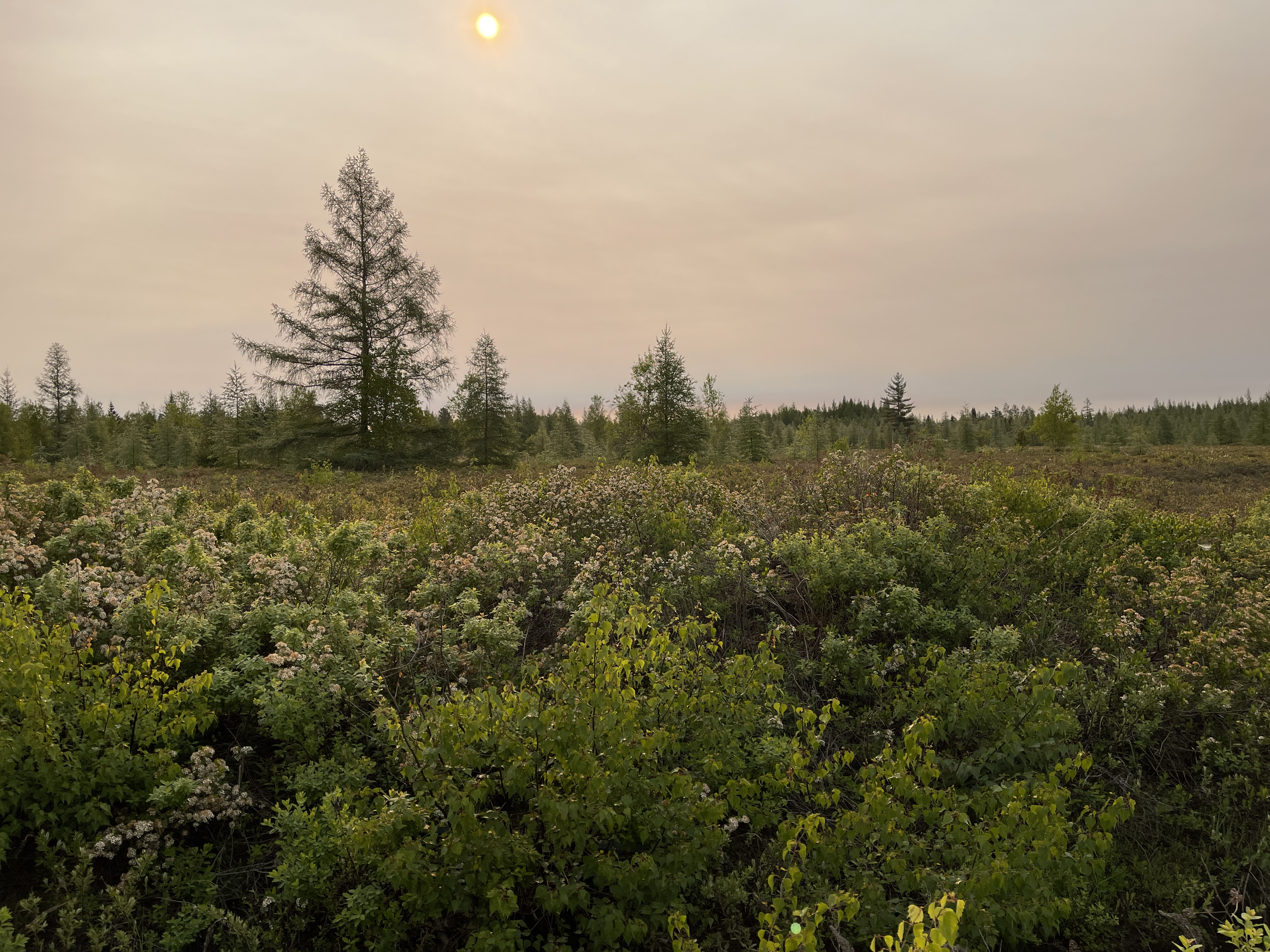
Area dominated by the larch (Larix laricina) and various species of ericaceae, Notre-Dame-du-Mont-Carmel
