= The Unknown Gods =

Role-playing game supplement

- Cover
- Authors: Bob Bledsaw, Mark Holmer, Jennell Jaquays (Note: Credited as Paul Jaquays.), and Mike Petrowsky
- Genre: Role-playing game
- Publisher: Judges Guild
- Publication date: 1980
- Media type: Print

The Unknown Gods is a supplement for fantasy role-playing games published by Judges Guild in 1980.

== Contents ==
The Unknown Gods is a supplement with short descriptions of 83 deities, each with illustrations by Jennell Jaquays.

The Unknown Gods contains original deities rather than gods taken from real world mythologies, each with descriptions in the format of Deities and Demigods, along with a chart displaying the disposition of each god at the moment.

== Publication history ==
The Unknown Gods was written by Bob Bledsaw, Mark Holmer, Jennell Jaquays, and Mike Petrowsky, and was published by Judges Guild in 1980 as a 48-page book.

TSR chose not to renew their license with Judges Guild for D&D after its September 1980 expiration, leaving The Book of Treasure Maps II (1980) and The Unknown Gods (1980) among the final products from Judges Guild to include the older D&D logo on them.

== Reception ==
Aaron Allston, reviewing The Unknown Gods in The Space Gamer No. 38, stated that the described deities are generally original and well presented, and have elegant and useful game mechanics; on the other hand, some examples were rather dull, and the book as a whole was quite fragmented. Allston concludes his review by saying, "This could be a useful volume, especially for DMs whose players are too familiar with the traditional gods. I'd recommend it to referees who suffer from a difficulty in creating deities."
