= New Frontiers =

New Frontiers may refer to:

- New Frontiers program, a series of NASA planetary science exploration missions
- New Frontiers Science Park, a former GSK research centre in Harlow, Essex
- Newfrontiers, a network of churches
- New Frontiers Entrepreneur Development Programme, an Enterprise Ireland funded entrepreneur development programme
- "New Frontiers" (Pan Am), a 2012 television episode

== See also ==
- New Frontier (disambiguation)
