= Sharon Butala =

Canadian writer and novelist

Sharon Butala OC SOM (born Sharon Annette LeBlanc, 1940 in Nipawin, Saskatchewan) is a Canadian writer and novelist.

== Life ==
Butala was born in an outpost hospital in Nipawin, Saskatchewan. She was the second of five daughters born to Amy Graham and Achille LeBlanc, who ran a sawmill near Garrick, Saskatchewan. In 1946, her family moved to the French-Canadian town of St. Louis, Saskatchewan, and moved again when she was thirteen years old to the city of Saskatoon, Saskatchewan. She attended the University of Saskatchewan obtaining both a Bachelor of Arts degree and a Bachelor of Education degree. Between her third and fourth year of university she married for the first time. This marriage lasted 14 years, and her son, Sean Hoy, was born during this time.

After graduating she taught English in Saskatchewan and British Columbia and also taught in a special program for the YMCA in Halifax, Nova Scotia. In 1969, she returned to Saskatoon and worked in special education at Princess Alexandra School. In 1972, she returned to the University of Saskatchewan to work on a post-graduate diploma in education and began teaching for the College of Education.

By 1975, she was divorced and working on her Master of Education degree with a budding academic career when she met Peter Butala. She abandoned her degree, and they were married on May 21, 1976, after which she moved to his ranch near Eastend, Saskatchewan. It was here that she began writing seriously, and this environment became the setting of much of her writing. Her first book, Country of the Heart, was published in 1984 and was shortlisted for the Books in Canada First Novel Award.

As head of the Eastend Arts Council she spearheaded the creation of the Wallace Stegner House Residence for Artists in which Wallace Stegner's childhood home was turned into a retreat for writers and artists. She lived near Eastend until 14 months after Peter's death in 2007. She now lives in Calgary, Alberta.

She was shortlisted for the Governor General's award three times, once for fiction for Queen of the Headaches, and twice for nonfiction, for The Perfection of the Morning and Where I Live Now. The Fall 2012 issue of Prairie Fire, entitled The Visionary Art of Sharon Butala was dedicated to Butala and her work and influence. She and her husband, Peter Butala, were also involved in the creation of the Old Man on His Back Prairie and Heritage Conservation Area. The Butala homestead is now the interpretive centre for this area of original and restored mixed grass prairie.

== Awards ==
- Marian Engel Award (1998)
- Officer of the Order of Canada (2001)
- Honorary Doctor of Laws, University of Regina (2000)
- Honorary Doctor of Letters, University of Saskatchewan (2004)
- Honorary Doctor of Letters, University of Alberta (2013)
- Saskatchewan Order of Merit (2009)
- Cheryl and Henry Kloppenburg Award for Literary Excellence. (2012)
- Five Conservation Awards

== Works ==
=== Fiction ===
- A Tropical Holiday, Branch Lines, 1981; Southwest Saskatchewan Writers Project
- Fever, HarperCollins, 1990
- Upstream, Fifth House, 1991; HarperCollins, 1996
- Country of the Heart, Fifth House, 1984; HarperCollins, 1999
- The Fourth Archangel, HarperCollins, 1992
- Luna, HarperPerennial Canada, 1994
- Queen of the Headaches, Coteau Books, 1994 (nominated for a Governor General's Award)
- The Gates of the Sun, HarperCollins, 2001
- The Garden of Eden, HarperFlamingo Canada- A Phyllis Bruce Book, 2002
- Real Life, HarperFlamingo Canada – A Phyllis Bruce Book, 2002
- Wild Rose, Coteau Books, 2015
- Zara's Dead, Coteau Books, 2018
- Season of Fury and Wonder, 2019 (winner of the 2019 W.O. Mitchell City of Calgary Book Award)

=== Non-fiction ===
- Harvest, Fifth House, 1992
- The Perfection of the Morning: An Apprenticeship in Nature, HarperCollins, 1994 (nominated for a Governor General's Award)
- Coyote's Morning Cry: Meditations & Dreams From a Life in Nature, HarperCollins, 1995
- Wild Stone Heart: An Apprenticeship in the Fields, HarperFlamingo Canada, 2000
- Old Man on His Back: Portrait of a Prairie Landscape, HarperCollins – A Phyllis Bruce Book, 2002 (with Courtney Milne)
- Lilac Moon, HarperPerennial – A Phyllis Bruce Book, 2005 (winner of the 2005 Saskatchewan Book Award for non-fiction)
- The Girl in Saskatoon: A Meditation on Friendship, Memory and Murder, HarperCollins – A Phyllis Bruce Book, 2008
- Where I Live Now: A Journey through Love and Loss to Healing and Hope, Simon & Schuster, 2017 (nominated for a Governor General's Award)
- This Strange Visible Air: Essays on Aging and the Writing Life, Freehand Books, 2021
