= Peter Carter (author) =

British writer of children's books (1929–1999)

- Born: 13 August 1929; Manchester, England
- Died: 21 July 1999 (aged 69); Warwick, England
- Education: Wadham College (MA, 1962)
- Occupation: Children's book author
- Spouses: Lois Wilkinson; Gudrun Willege
- Writing career
- Notable awards: Guardian Children's Fiction Prize (1981)

Peter Carter (13 August 1929 – 21 July 1999) was a British writer of children's books, primarily historical novels. He won several awards: the Guardian Prize, two Young Observer Prizes, and the German Preis der Leseratten. His books were shortlisted for many more prizes, and were translated into at least six languages, from Japanese to Portuguese.

== Personal life and education ==
Carter was born in Manchester, one of eight children. He left school at 14 and later took evening classes in art and philosophy, before entering Wadham College, Oxford at age 30. There, he received the M.A. in English Literature in 1962.

Carter's first wife Lois Wilkinson died after one year, during his time at Oxford. He later married Gudrun Willege, a German photographer —or Ulrike Willige— and moved to Hamburg, Germany, in 1976. Later they divorced and remarried; he moved or visited back and forth. He married four times in all, and had one stepson. His long-term partner was Elizabeth Hodgkin (b.1941), Historian, author and daughter of the Nobel Prize winning chemist Dorothy Crowfoot Hodgkin (1910-1994).

On 21 July 1999 Carter died from abdominal hæmorrhage while writing at his home in Warwick.

== Career ==
Carter worked as a school teacher from 1963 to 1976, then a full-time writer until his death in 1999.

For Under Goliath (Oxford, 1977) he was a commended runner-up for the Carnegie Medal from the Library Association, recognising the year's best children's book by a British subject. (Note: Today there are usually eight books on the Carnegie Medal shortlist. According to CCSU, there were about 160 commendations of two kinds in 49 years from 1954 to 2002, including Carter and two others for 1977.) He won Guardian Children's Fiction Prize for The Sentinels, published by Oxford University Press in 1981. The annual book award is judged by a panel of British children's writers and recognises the year's best book by an author who has not yet won it.

== Awards and honours ==
Awards for Carter's writing
Year	Title	Award	Result	Ref.
1978	Under Goliath	Carnegie Medal	Commended	
1981	The Sentinels	Guardian Children's Fiction Prize	Winner	
1981	The Sentinels	Premio Europeo di Letteratura Giovanile	Winner	
1982	Children of the Book	Young Observer/Rank Organisation Fiction prize	Winner	
1982	Children of the Book	Preis der Leseratten	Winner	
1987	Bury the Dead	Young Observer Teenage Fiction Award	Winner	

== Publications ==
All of Carter's books were published by Oxford University Press.

- The Black Lamp (1973), illustrated by David Harris
- The Gates of Paradise (1974), illus. Fermin Rocker
- Madatan (1974), illus. Victor Ambrus
- Mao (1976), a biography
- Under Goliath (1977)
- The Sentinels (1980)
- Children of the Book (1982)
- Captain Teachum's Buried Treasure (1989), illus. Korky Paul
- Bury the Dead (1987)
- Leaving Cheyenne (1990); U.S. title, Borderlands
- The Hunted (1993)
- Fairy Tales from Grimm retold by Carter (Oxford, 1999)
