= Borderlands (novel) =

1991 novel by Peter Carter

- The hardcover edition.
- Author: Peter Carter
- Language: English
- Genre: Young adult, Western
- Publisher: Farrar Straus & Giroux
- Publication date: June 1990 (Hardcover), September 1993 (Paperback)
- Publication place: United States
- Media type: Print (Hardcover, Paperback)
- Pages: 423
- ISBN: 978-0-374-30895-7

Borderlands is a 1991 children's historical novel by author Peter Carter. Originally published in the UK in 1990 as Leaving Cheyenne, it is a study of the American West in 1871 as seen through the eyes of a 14-year-old boy.

== Plot ==
Borderlands spans several decades as the somewhat naïve orphan, Ben Curtis, loses his mother and his brother, and learns the harsh lessons of life in the Wild West, experiencing the rise and fall of famous boom towns like Abilene and Dodge City.

=== Part I: Getting Along ===
In Clement County, Texas, Beauregard 'Bo' Curtis, his younger brother Benjamin 'Ben', and their widowed mother are struggling to keep their farm afloat in the tough economic times of the late 19th century. But during the summer of 1870, their sickly mother dies, leaving the two brothers to take care of the family farm alone. Ben and Bo hope to receive help from their estranged sister Flo, but to their dismay Flo is now married and has turned her back on her family, leaving them to suffer in poverty alone.

To make matters worse, they also discover that their poor mother owed money to the local preacher, Tyler, and are quickly evicted from their only home, left to fend for themselves on the harsh prairie. Completely broke, and now without a roof over their heads, the two brothers set out for the town of Lookout, Texas in hope of getting some jobs working on Sam Clark's cattle drive. However, when they arrive in Lookout, they discover that they have missed the Cattle Drive by three days. The town marshal informs them that they still can catch Joe Dutton's cattle drive if they hurry.

Bo and Ben manage to catch up and hired by a reluctant Dutton; given the standard cowboy equipment. During the cattle drive, the two brothers bond with the other cowhands, and their African American cook. Throughout the drive, Ben begins to gain respect for black Americans; he stops calling the cook "nigger" and uses his real name, Tom Arnold. After half a year of travelling through snow, rain, and sand storms on the desert plains, they arrive in the boom town of Abilene, Kansas, on 13 June 1871. The men are paid and ride into town in search of fun. But to Ben's horror, Bo is shot in the back by a man named Dutch Kessel over a crooked card game. After Bo's funeral, the cattle drive heads to the next town to complete the run, but leaves without Ben – who is so heartbroken over the death of his last loved one, he decides to stay in Abilene and avenge Bo's death by killing Dutch Kessel.

=== Part II: Making It ===
Ben Curtis contemplates whether to get his revenge by challenging Kessel to a duel, or just shooting in the back like he did Bo. But to Ben's dismay, Dutch Kessel fled town the night after he murdered Bo. Ben considers hunting Kessel down, but the town marshal, Wild Bill Hickok warns Ben to stay out of trouble and not to try to take the law into his own hands, or else he would have to shoot him on the spot. Ben reluctantly obeys, intimidated by the tough hardened marshal, and gets a job as a shopkeeper. Ben finds his new job degrading, considering it to be women's work. Making matters worse, his boss, Jacob Besser, and his daughter Goblinka, are foreign immigrants, causing Ben to further disrespect them.

During the first days working for Besser, Ben looks back on his life, wondering where it all went wrong. But he eventually grows used to his new life quiet lifestyle in Abilene, and after staying there for nearly two years, Ben forgets all about his vow to avenge Bo. He befriends his neighbour/chess partner Henry, an immigrant from Germany. Ben suspects that Henry is both a communist and an arsonist, but never asks him about it, not wanting to jeopardise their friendship.

But Ben's life is disrupted yet again, when Marshall Hickok informs Ben that Dutch Kessel has been shot dead, in St. Louis, Missouri. Ben is now a local celebrity, even though he had nothing to do with Kessel's death. Finally free from his vow, Ben gets a whole new leash on life, along with multiple job opportunities. Ben decides to go into business with Besser, selling cowboy hats. With his newfound fame on his side, Ben's business quickly lifts off the ground, and he wonders about a future as a businessman like Besser.

But the town of Abilene starts to change into a ghost town as more and more people leave by the day. Worse still, Henry announces that he's going to go live with his sister in New York City; but not before confirming Ben's suspicions about his communism (not that Ben cares any more). The orphan says good-bye to his last friend in town. On his own last day in Abilene, Ben visits Bo's grave one last time and pays his respects to his dead brother. His last few ties to Abilene now gone, Ben boards a train for the growing town of Dodge City, Kansas, to set up a fur business with Jacob Besser's brother, Brusik.

=== Part III: Busted ===
When Ben Curtis arrives in Dodge City he finds it's nothing like the rumours said it would be. Instead of being a boom town, it's just getting started, and the city is running rampant with crime. Worried about his own safety, Ben considers going back to Abilene until he meets Brusik Besser, his new business partner.

In the days that follow, Ben opens a successful fur selling business, and grows accustomed to another changing lifestyle. Ben is almost robbed one day, just barely driving the bandits off, and decides to hire some bodyguards to protect the furs – who themselves turn out to be thugs. Faced with the difficult decision about whether to become a victim or a fighter, Ben and Brusik decide to keep them under hire.

After a few more months, Ben is wealthy; keeping a large supply of money hidden beneath the floorboards of his office. But when the stock market crashes in 1873, Ben is forced into bankruptcy. To his horror and anger, he is forced to leave his store (and the money he hid underneath it), when it's bought by a man named Tom Stokes.

=== Part IV: Killing Times ===
Once again Ben Curtis finds himself homeless and penniless but now he is also without his older brother, Bo, to guide him. Almost defeated by his predicament he finds employment, working for Sam Dawson, skinning buffaloes. He is miserable but able to survive.

After spending a few months on the prairie Ben, despite rumours of him being wanted by the Pinkerton family for owing money to the bank, eagerly returns to Dodge in hopes of finding the money he hid in his shop. But it's already been taken by Tom Stokes. Ben, furious, returns to his demeaning job. He and Sam briefly run into Ben's old friend, Tom Arnold again (who warns them of disputes with Indians up ahead), before continuing on their way to the Californian border.

When they're close, Sam reveals, to Ben's delight, that he plans on retiring there, and wants Ben to retire with him. When they camp out with some other cowboys for the night, Ben finds out Dutch Kessel is still alive. The story of his demise in St. Louis was false, and he's actually in camp with them. Kessel finds Ben is still alive as well, and hunts him down, killing Sam in cold blood. Kessel chases Ben through a snowstorm on horseback, and reveals that his fear about Ben gunning him down has haunted him for years, unlike Ben had chosen to put the past behind him. Ben only survives because a Native American war party appears and skewers Kessel, choosing to spare Ben.

In the aftermath, Ben decides not to go to California – now that the dreamer is dead, the dream has lost all meaning. With all his friends and family gone, the now adult Ben move in with his old friend Henry in New York. Ben spends the rest of his life there, the last surviving cowboy from the wild (and rapidly changing), western frontier.

== Reception ==
Bryan Wooley of Entertainment Weekly praised the novel, "Carter has done his research. His portrayal of the tedium, filth, and barbarism of the frontier are vivid and realistic. What the tale lacks is dramatic tension, probably because Ben tells his story in a folksy, corn-pone voice that, over 424 pages, becomes wearisome. B−".

The New York Times Children's Bookshelf briefly noted it as "a realistic Western".
