= The Frontier (novel) =

1935 novel by Zofia Nałkowska

The Frontier (Polish: Granica) is a novel written by Zofia Nałkowska, a renowned Polish prose writer, dramatist, and prolific essayist. It tells the story of the life of Zenon Ziembiewicz, his way to the top and success, as well as love affairs and problems. The novel itself combines features of many different genres: psychological novel, sensation novel, realistic prose and detective novel. Originally, the author wanted to title her book “Patterns”, however, she changed her mind and decided on “The Frontier”. The novel has been made into a film twice: in 1938 and 1977.

Story is written by means of analepsis and the plot often is interjected with scenes that take the narrative back in time from the current point. Written during the interwar period, the novel describes such controversial topics as abortion, and the economic and social problems of that time.

== Characters ==
- Zenon Ziembiewicz – the protagonist of the novel, an intellectual, whose career evolves rapidly
- Elżbieta Biecka – Zenon's wife, a noble
- Justyna Bogutówna – Zenon's lover, comes from deprived home
- Walerian Ziembiewicz – Zenon's father, who had numerous lovers during his marriage, and used to be a nobleman
- Żancia Ziembiewicz – Zenon's mother
- Niewieska – mother of Elżbieta, a divorced woman, still very beautiful, living abroad
- Niewieski – Elżbieta's step-father, a very handsome man, minister, financier, politician
- Cecylia Kolichowska – aunt of Elżbieta
- Adela - Zenon's lover during his time in Paris, dies from tuberculosis after he leaves for Poland
- Karol Wabrowski – Zenon's friend who studied with him in Paris, Cecylia's son

== Plot ==
Young Zenon Ziembiewicz, member of a noble, but not very wealthy family, leaves for town and starts studying. There he meets Elżbieta Biecka, a young lady, brought up by her aunt, who comes from a rich family. Zenon travels to Paris and starts further study at a university. When he comes back to his hometown, he meets Justyna Bogutówna, a poor and fatherless daughter of a cook. Eventually, a love affair starts between them. Later, without formally breaking up with Justyna, Zenon goes back to town, where he eventually gets engaged to Elżbieta. Justyna, due to her mother's illness, by chance moves to the same tenement house as Zenon. They meet once again and soon become lovers again. Elżbieta knows the truth and leaves him, however, Zenon wins her back, and soon enough they get married. Later Elżbieta becomes pregnant. Despite those circumstances, Zenon wants to help Justyna, who carries his baby, and gives her money for living. Although it was not precisely Zenon's will, Justyna has an abortion and suffers horrible qualms because of what she did. Elżbieta's and Zenon's son is born, and named Walerian after Zenon's father. In the meantime, Zenon's career evolves rapidly - he becomes the town's mayor. Justyna, deeply depressed, decides to commit a crime and pours caustic acid over Zenon. As a result, he becomes blind and later commits suicide.
