= Final Frontier =

Final Frontier may refer to:

== Places ==
- Outer space, especially from the perspective of space colonization
  - "The final frontier", a description of space used in the opening narration of the science fiction TV series Star Trek
- Deep sea, a final frontier for exploration and colonization on Earth

== Entertainment ==
=== Star Trek ===
- Star Trek V: The Final Frontier, a 1989 American science fiction film directed by William Shatner
  - Star Trek V: The Final Frontier, a novelization of the film by J.M. Dillard
  - Star Trek V: The Final Frontier, a comic adaptation of the film
  - Star Trek V: The Final Frontier (computer game), a video game based on the film published by Mindscape
  - Star Trek V: The Final Frontier (soundtrack)
- Final Frontier, a 1988 novel by Diane Carey

=== Literature ===
- The Final Frontier, a 2018 short story anthology edited by Neil Clarke
- Final Frontier: The Pioneering Science and Technology of Exploring the Universe a 2014 science book by Brian Clegg
- Justice League Odyssey, Vol. 3: Final Frontier, a 2020 collected edition of the third half of Justice League Odyssey, an ongoing DC Comics comic book series

=== Video games ===
- Final Frontier, a scenario on the expansion pack Civilization IV: Beyond the Sword for the video game Civilization IV

=== Television episodes ===
- "Final Frontier", ChuckleVision series 7, episode 11 (1995)
- "The Final Frontier", A.T.O.M. season 1, episode 9 (2005)
- "The Final Frontier", Ballykissangel series 4, episode 12 (1998)
- "The Final Frontier", Castle season 5, episode 6 (2012)
- "The Final Frontier", Designated Survivor season 2, episode 12 (2018)
- "The Final Frontier", Eureka Seven: AO episode 23 (2012)
- "The Final Frontier", Mad About You season 7, episode 21–22 (1999)
- "The Final Frontier", Northern Exposure season 3, episode 20 (1992)

== Music ==
- The Final Frontier, a 1985 album featuring selected performances of film and television themes conducted by Roy Budd with the London Symphony Orchestra
- The Final Frontier, Iron Maiden's fifteenth studio album, released in the summer of 2010
  - "Satellite 15... The Final Frontier", a song from the above album
- The Final Frontier (Keel album), an album by heavy metal band Keel
- "Final Frontier" (song), a single from American rapper MC Ren from the 1992 album Kizz My Black Azz
- "Final Frontier", a song by RJD2 from his 2002 album Deadringer
- "Final Frontier", the theme song to the sitcom Mad About You, sung by Andrew Gold
- "Final Frontier", an album by Mars Lasar released in 2003
- "Final Frontier", a track by Thomas Bergersen from his album Sun

== Other uses ==
- Final Frontier (game), a 1980 miniatures game
- "Final Frontier", Act. 14 of Dual! Parallel Trouble Adventure (1999), released as an Dual! Parallel Trouble Adventure Special OVA

== See also ==
- Final (disambiguation)
- Frontier (disambiguation)
- The Last Frontier (disambiguation)
