= Divide, Saskatchewan =

Community in Saskatchewan, Canada

Divide
- Unincorporated community
- Location within Frontier No. 19 Location within Saskatchewan
- Coordinates: 49.1489°N 109.1336°W
- Country: Canada
- Province: Saskatchewan
- Region: Southwest
- Census division: 4
- Rural municipality: Frontier No. 19
- Post office Founded: N/A
- Incorporated (Village): N/A
- Incorporated (Town): N/A

Government
  - Administrator: Kim Lacelle
  - Governing body: Frontier No. 19

Population (2006)
  - Total: 0
- Time zone: CST
- Postal code: S0N 0M0
- Area code: 306
- Highways: Highway 18
- Railways: Canadian Pacific Railway

Divide is an unincorporated community within the Rural Municipality of Frontier No. 19, Saskatchewan, Canada. The community is 35 kilometres (22 mi) south of the community of Robsart and 85 kilometres (53 mi) southwest of the town of Eastend on Highway 18. Very little remains in Divide — only a church and post office still stand.

== Notable residents ==
- Les Colwill, NHL hockey player

== See also ==
- List of communities in Saskatchewan
- List of ghost towns in Saskatchewan
