= Frontier (pinball) =

1980 pinball machine

- Manufacturer: Bally
- Release date: November 1980
- System: Bally/Midway MPU AS-2518-133
- Model #: 1217
- Players: 4
- Design: George Christian
- Artwork: Greg Freres, Margaret Hudson, Kevin O'Connor
- Production run: 1,850 units

Frontier is a Bally pinball machine (produced under the Bally name) released in November 1980. It is based on the mountain man and hunting theme.

== Gameplay ==
=== Den of Predators and Frontier Bonus ===
The basic game play is to collect two separate bonuses. The Den of Predators are 5 rows of 3 animals, rolling over lanes A, B and C or hitting the left, center, or right stationary targets lights one animal in the left, center, or right columns respectively. Lighting a complete row of animals advances the "Frontier Bonus". Lighting all the animals advances the "Frontier Bonus" to 60,000 and the "Predator Bonus" to 45,000 and lights "Special".

=== Grizzly Target ===
3 in-line drop targets lead the way to the Grizzly Target, increasing the Frontier bonus multiplier. The first drop target also opens the gate to "Frontier Falls".

=== Right drop targets ===
The bank of drop target on the right of the pinball machine increase the "Den of Predators" multiplier. They also control targets for "Specials" and awards for "Specials".

=== Frontier Falls ===
Frontier Falls is a saucer accessed by first opening a gate activated by hitting the Grizzly Targets. Getting the ball into Frontier Falls collects the current Frontier Bonus.

== Playfield features ==
- 2 Flippers
- 2 Slingshots
- 3 Pop bumpers
- 3 Bank drop targets
- 3 In-line drop targets
- 4 Stationary targets
- Rollunder spinner
- Saucer Kick-out hole
