= Rural Municipality of Frontier No. 19 =

Rural municipality in Saskatchewan, Canada

Frontier No. 19
- Rural municipality
- Rural Municipality of Frontier No. 19
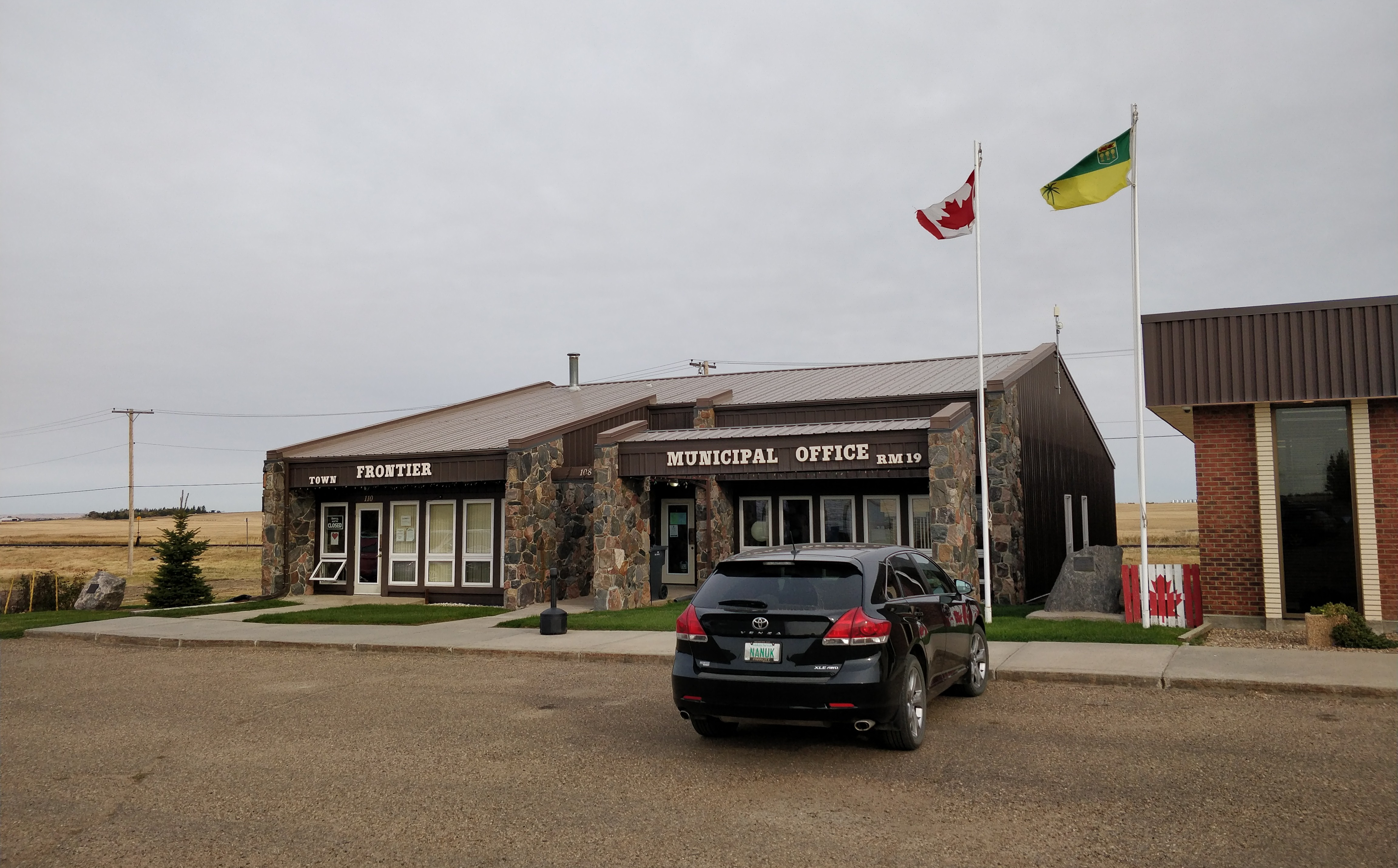
- Municipal office in the Village of Frontier

- Location of the RM of Frontier No. 19 in Saskatchewan
- Coordinates: 49.147°N 108.759°W
- Country: Canada
- Province: Saskatchewan
- Census division: 4
- SARM division: 3
- Federal riding: Cypress Hills--Grasslands
- Provincial riding: Cypress Hills
- Formed: January 1, 1913

Government
  - Reeve: Troy Heggestad
  - Governing body: RM of Frontier No. 19 Council
  - Administrator: Barb Webber
  - Office location: Frontier

Area (2016)
  - Land: 1,675.02 km^{2} (646.73 sq mi)

Population (2016)
  - Total: 326
  - Density: 0.2/km^{2} (0.52/sq mi)
- Time zone: CST
  - Summer (DST): CST
- Postal code: S0N 0W0
- Area codes: 306 and 639

The Rural Municipality of Frontier No. 19 (2016 population: 326) is a rural municipality (RM) in the Canadian province of Saskatchewan within Census Division No. 4 and SARM Division No. 3. Located in the southwest portion of the province, it is adjacent to the United States border, neighbouring Blaine County in Montana.

== History ==
The RM of Frontier No. 19 incorporated as a rural municipality on January 1, 1913. The name of the RM originated in 1912, reflecting its position along the United States boundary. The first Frontier post office, opened 1917, was just four miles north of the border. The Village of Frontier took its name from the surrounding RM in 1923.

== Geography ==
=== Communities and localities ===
The following urban municipalities are surrounded by the RM.

Villages

- Frontier

The following unincorporated communities are within the RM.

Localities

- Claydon
- Divide
- Loomis
- Staynor Hall

== Demographics ==
Population history (1981–2016)
Year	Pop.	±%
1981	410	—
1986	392	−4.4%
1991	338	−13.8%
1996	333	−1.5%
2001	319	−4.2%
2006	323	+1.3%
2011	371	+14.9%
2016	326	−12.1%
Source: Statistics Canada via Saskatchewan Bureau of Statistics

In the 2021 Census of Population conducted by Statistics Canada, the RM of Frontier No. 19 had a population of 347 living in 87 of its 107 total private dwellings, a change of 6.4% from its 2016 population of 326. With a land area of 1,631.39 km^{2} (629.88 sq mi), it had a population density of 0.2/km^{2} (0.6/sq mi) in 2021.

In the 2016 Census of Population, the RM of Frontier No. 19 recorded a population of 326 living in 91 of its 109 total private dwellings, a −12.1% change from its 2011 population of 371. With a land area of 1,675.02 km^{2} (646.73 sq mi), it had a population density of 0.2/km^{2} (0.5/sq mi) in 2016.

== Government ==
The RM of Frontier No. 19 is governed by an elected municipal council and an appointed administrator that meets on the second Tuesday of every month. The reeve of the RM is Troy Heggestad while its administrator is Barb Webber. The RM's office is located in Frontier.

== Transportation ==
Highway	Starting point	Communities	Ending point
Highway 18	Saskatchewan Highway 13	Frontier, Claydon, and Loomis	Manitoba Highway 3

== See also ==
- List of rural municipalities in Saskatchewan
- Old Man on His Back Prairie and Heritage Conservation Area
