= Les Colwill =

Canadian retired ice hockey right winger

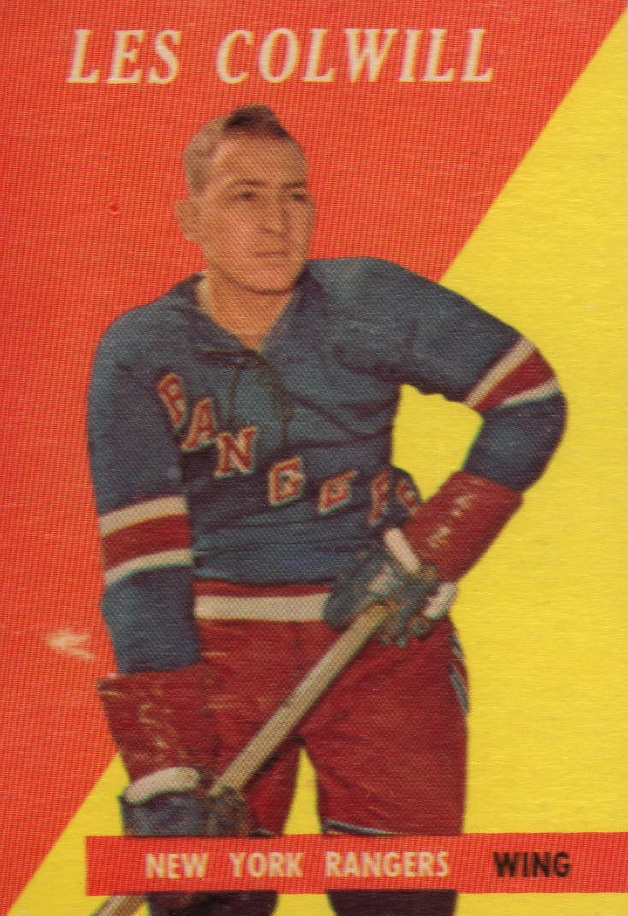
- Born: January 1, 1935 (age 91) Divide, Saskatchewan, Canada
- Height: 5 ft 11 in (180 cm)
- Weight: 170 lb (77 kg; 12 st 2 lb)
- Position: Right wing
- Shot: Right
- Played for: New York Rangers
- Playing career: 1951–1960

Leslie John Colwill (born January 1, 1935) is a Canadian retired ice hockey right winger who played 69 games in the National Hockey League for the New York Rangers during the 1958–59 season. The rest of his career, which lasted from 1955 to 1960, was mainly spent in the minor Western Hockey League.

== Career statistics ==
=== Regular season and playoffs ===
			Regular season					Playoffs
Season	Team	League	GP	G	A	Pts	PIM	GP	G	A	Pts	PIM
1951–52	Lethbridge Native Sons	WCJHL	28	11	7	18	0	4	5	2	7	0
1952–53	Lethbridge Native Sons	WCJHL	28	15	10	25	8	13	4	6	10	0
1952–53	Lethbridge Native Sons	M-Cup	—	—	—	—	—	11	1	3	4	0
1953–54	Lethbridge Native Sons	WCJHL	36	37	35	72	4	4	1	1	2	4
1954–55	Lethbridge Native Sons	WCJHL	38	20	32	52	23	11	4	9	13	0
1954–55	Saskatoon Quakers	WHL	2	0	0	0	0	—	—	—	—	—
1954–55	Regina Pats	M-Cup	—	—	—	—	—	2	1	0	1	4
1955–56	Saskatoon Quakers	WHL	70	17	21	38	37	3	2	1	3	2
1956–57	Brandon Regals	WHL	68	29	26	55	23	9	4	3	7	6
1957–58	Saskatoon Regals/St. Paul Saints	WHL	70	35	27	62	30	—	—	—	—	—
1958–59	New York Rangers	NHL	69	7	6	13	16	—	—	—	—	—
1959–60	Vancouver Canucks	WHL	66	17	22	39	10	—	—	—	—	—
WHL totals			276	98	96	194	100	12	6	4	10	8
NHL totals			69	7	6	13	16	—	—	—	—	—
