= SS Frontier =

Frontier was the name of three steamships operated by African Coasters (Pty) Ltd, Durban, South Africa.

- SS Frontier (1896), in service 1922–26
- SS Frontier (1922), in service 1952–57
- SS Frontier (1943), in service 1958–66
