= Griffin Mountain =

Tabletop fantasy role-playing game supplement

A Complete Wilderness Campaign for RuneQuest
- Cover by Jennell Jaquays (Note: Credited as Paul Jaquays.).
- Designers: Rudy Kraft; Jennell Jaquays; Greg Stafford
- Publishers: Chaosium; Avalon Hill; Moon Design Publications
- Publication: 1981 Griffin Mountain (Chaosium); 1986 Griffin Island (Avalon Hill); 2001 Griffin Mountain (Moon Design Publications; 2020 Griffin Mountain (Chaosium)
- Genres: Fantasy
- Systems: Basic Role-Playing
- ISBN: 9781568825144

Griffin Mountain is a tabletop role-playing game supplement for RuneQuest, written by Rudy Kraft, Jennell Jaquays, and Greg Stafford, and published by Chaosium in 1981. Griffin Mountain is a wilderness campaign setting for the RuneQuest system, focussed on the land of Balazar and the Elder Wilds. It contains role-playing material to help gamemasters design adventures in the setting. It received positive reviews in game periodicals including Ares, White Dwarf, The Space Gamer, and Dragon.

== Contents ==
Various chapters of the book give background on the world of Glorantha; the citizens and leaders of Balazar; caravans and how the players might interact with one; how to obtain information, ranging from lies and wild rumors to the truth; how wilderness encounters can be set up; and "points of interest", which can be used as starting places for adventures.

== Publication history ==
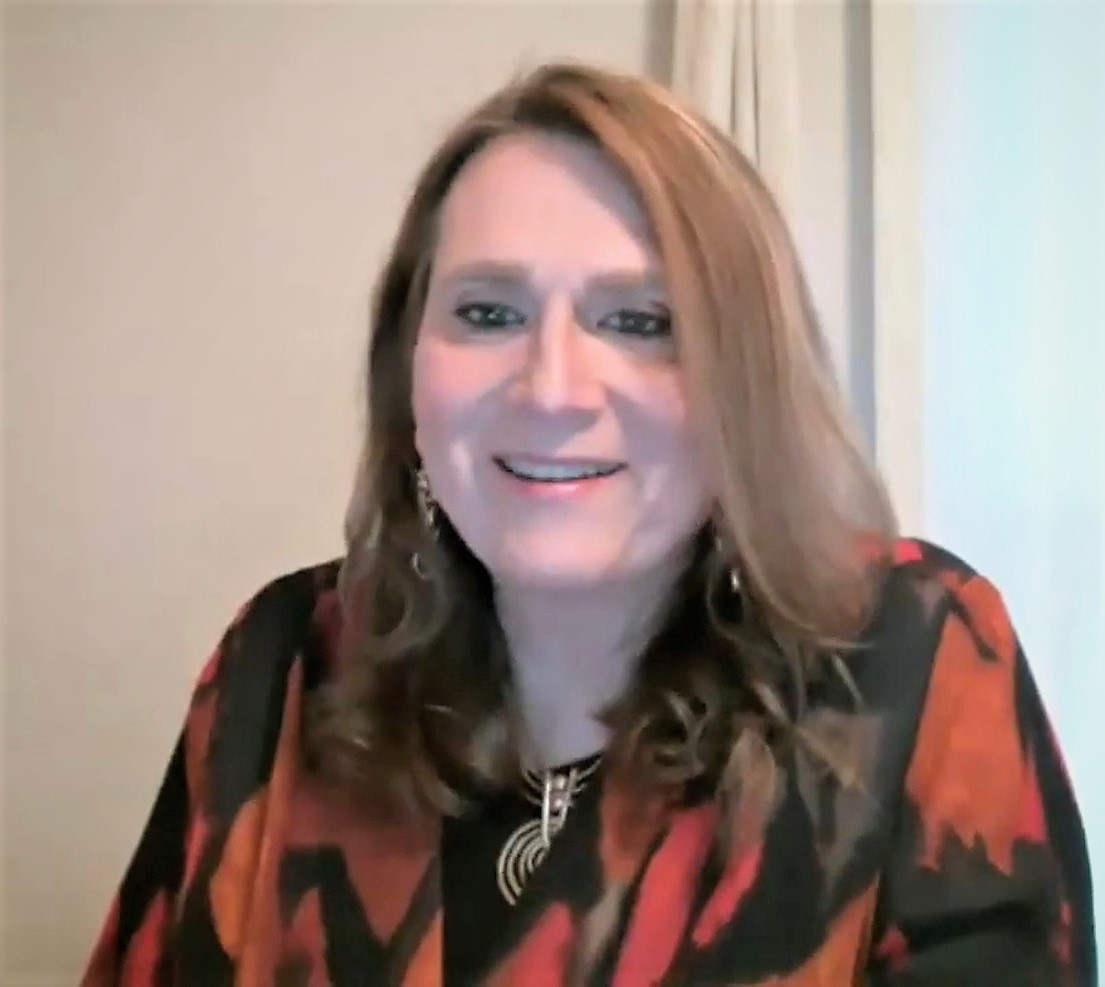
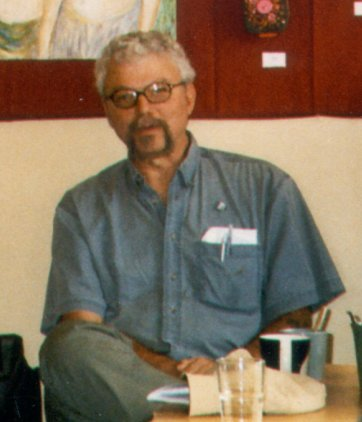
The book's designers included Jennell Jaquays and Greg Stafford.

Griffin Mountain was written by Rudy Kraft, Jennell Jaquays, and Greg Stafford, and was published by Chaosium in 1981 as a 202-page book with a map bound inside the back cover. RPG historian Stu Horvath noted that "Fascinatingly, the entire book was written without the trio ever meeting in person — a common enough occurrence in the twenty-first century but one that seems onerous and impressive in an era when communications over distance was limited to phone calls and snail mail."

Originally published as a softcover by Chaosium in 1981. It was updated in 1986 with the Glorantha background replaced by generic fantasy, and published as Griffin Island as a boxed set by Avalon Hill. Moon Design Publications republished the original Griffin Mountain with parts of Griffin Island in 2001 in soft and hardback. It was published as a PDF in 2018, and as a POD in 2020, as part of Chaosium's RuneQuest: Classic Edition Kickstarter. The pull-out map was made available separately through print on demand at Redbubble.

== Reception ==
Eric Goldberg reviewed Griffin Mountain in Ares Magazine #10 and commented that "Griffin Mountain is not just better because it is bigger. Messrs. Kraft, Jaquays and Stafford have created a campaign which demonstrates, by example, what a gamemaster should prepare for a serious role-playing campaign."

Murray Writtle reviewed Griffin Mountain for White Dwarf #27, giving it an overall rating of 9 out of 10, and stated that "This is an exemplary work, full of imagination, clear thought and hard work. It contains much material relevant not only to itself or for a single use, but to many situations and for repeated use. In short, it's a labour of love and a must for all Glorantha-orientated RuneQuest umpires."

David Dunham reviewed Griffin Mountain in The Space Gamer No. 48. Dunham commented that "Griffin Mountain represents the state of the art in published scenarios. It's more than a soulless listing of characteristics or a collection of disjointed encounters. I highly recommend it to all RuneQuest referees, and to anyone who wants an example of how a campaign should be set up."

In Issue 4 of Adventurer, Tom Zunder liked the quality of the components, writing, "The whole style of presentation is excellent, with an appealing cover illustration and well laid out contents." Zunder found the overall contents good as well, noting, "it provides a core structure of locations, a wide and interesting cast of NPCs and what is still a wide range of scenarios and locations, separated by a vast expanse of land mass which can allow the Gamemaster full rein in working on the idea that places, people and scenario hooks will inspire." Zunder concluded, "Given the quality of material here, and the wealth of material compared to the 3 AD&D scenarios the money would otherwise buy you, I cannot do anything bu recommend it to all new RuneQuest Refs and all wanting an excellent and adaptable campaign setting to explore and extrapolate from."

In the February 1982 edition of Dragon (Issue #58), Bill Fawcett was impressed by the amount of material provided, saying, "The 200-page supplement is packed with more information than some role-playing systems contain in their entirety." He was also thankful for the indices, which made looking up specific information quite easy. His opinion was that the book was "generally well written and clear to anyone familiar with RuneQuest", but he did warn new players that this probably was not the setting to start with, since "Even a good player with an experienced character is challenged and in dire straights [sic] fairly often." Fawcett concluded that for experienced RuneQuest players, "you may not be able to resist this offering. If you are new to RuneQuest, it may prove a bit much for your character, but the background alone make interesting reading."

In his 2023 book Monsters, Aliens, and Holes in the Ground, RPG historian Stu Horvath commented, "Griffin Mountain marks the first time an RPG campaign packed this amount of information into a single product." Horvath also noted that "Griffin Mountain takes an intricate approach to its world — one that focuses on players experiencing a different reality, rather than only centering on tactical combat."

== Awards ==
In 1981, this adventure was a finalist for an H.G. Wells Awards.
