= The Frontier (website) =

Non-profit investigatory journalism in Oklahoma

- Website type: News website
- Founded: 2016
- Headquarters: Tulsa, Oklahoma, {{{location_country}}}
- Owner: The Frontier Media Group Inc.
- Founders: Robert Lorton III and Ziva Branstetter
- Website: www.readfrontier.org
- Commercial: No

The Frontier is an investigative news and multi-media platform website that practices long-form, watchdog journalism related to the U.S. state of Oklahoma. The Frontier is headquartered in Tulsa, Oklahoma. The publication has become a non-profit corporation operated by The Frontier Media Group Inc.

== History ==
The corporation, founded in 2016, is overseen by a board that includes Frontier co-founders, former Tulsa World president and publisher, Robert Lorton III, and Ziva Branstetter, a former special projects editor of the Tulsa World and currently an editor at The Washington Post. Branstetter and Carey Aspinwall, who is now based in Dallas covering Southern U.S. crime news with the Marshall Project, were finalists for Local News coverage for the 2015 Pulitzer Prize. They had been nominated for their 2014 work on botched executions in Oklahoma. In 2017, The Frontier's staff included publisher Lorton, former World staff reporters Dylan Goforth, its Editor in Chief, and Clifton Adcock, Senior Staff Writer, as well as Kassie McClung and Aspinwall. Regarding its initial hires, Andy Rieger a University of Oklahoma journalism professor and former decades-long editor and columnist at the Norman Transcript said: "They were some of the best writers and editors the World had." "That gave it credibility not only in Tulsa, but in Oklahoma."

It originally charged $30 a month for the investigative stories on its site, though it subsequently dropped its paywall. At the time it had about 650 members and aimed for 850 in its first 12 months, said Lorton.

The organization has conducted research and enterprise reporting on issues important to the Oklahoma public, including a five-part series on rape in December 2017, problems within the Tulsa County jail, stories about major problems regarding a wealthy Sheriff's department contributor who was a reserve deputy who accidentally killed an arrestee, and the bonuses paid to CoreCivic, a for-profit prison operator, despite repeated riots in 2015 in its Cushing prison, at the same time the staff in state prisons suffered from stagnant wages.

The Frontier was honored as a finalist for Best New Website in the 2016 Great Plains Journalism Awards. It also partnered with local, state and national media outlets for groundbreaking investigative projects and experimented with novel ways to tell stories. It is one of Oklahoma's leading advocates for transparency in government and has fought for access to records on the public's behalf. In 2018, it was chosen as one of three finalists for the 2017 annual award in the Scripps Howard Foundation's Community Journalism category, for its series, "Shadow Land: How Rape Stays Hidden in Oklahoma."

== Operation ==
The Frontier gets its operating revenue from subscriptions and donations along with funding from sponsors.

Its competitors include the state's major daily newspapers: The Oklahoman, published by GateHouse Media owned by Fortress Investment Group and its investor Softbank since October 1, 2018, and formerly owned since 2011 by Denver-based billionaire businessman Philip Anschutz and his Anschutz Corporation; and the Tulsa World, which was sold in 2013 to Berkshire Hathaway's BH Media Group, controlled by billionaire Warren Buffett.

== Investigation impact ==
The Frontier has partnered on Oklahoma stories with national and international media, such as the Marshall Project, and the Guardian in Great Britain. That investigation of the Pardon and Parole Board alleged that no applications for commutations or pardons had been reviewed for three years. The resulting public awareness of incarceration issues news stories by Frontier, The Oklahoman and Tulsa World spurred policy changes within the agency by 2018 newly elected Oklahoma Governor Kevin Stitt who led the release of over 500 non-violent offender inmates.
