= Frontier, Saskatchewan =

Village in Saskatchewan, Canada

Frontier
- Village
- Village of Frontier
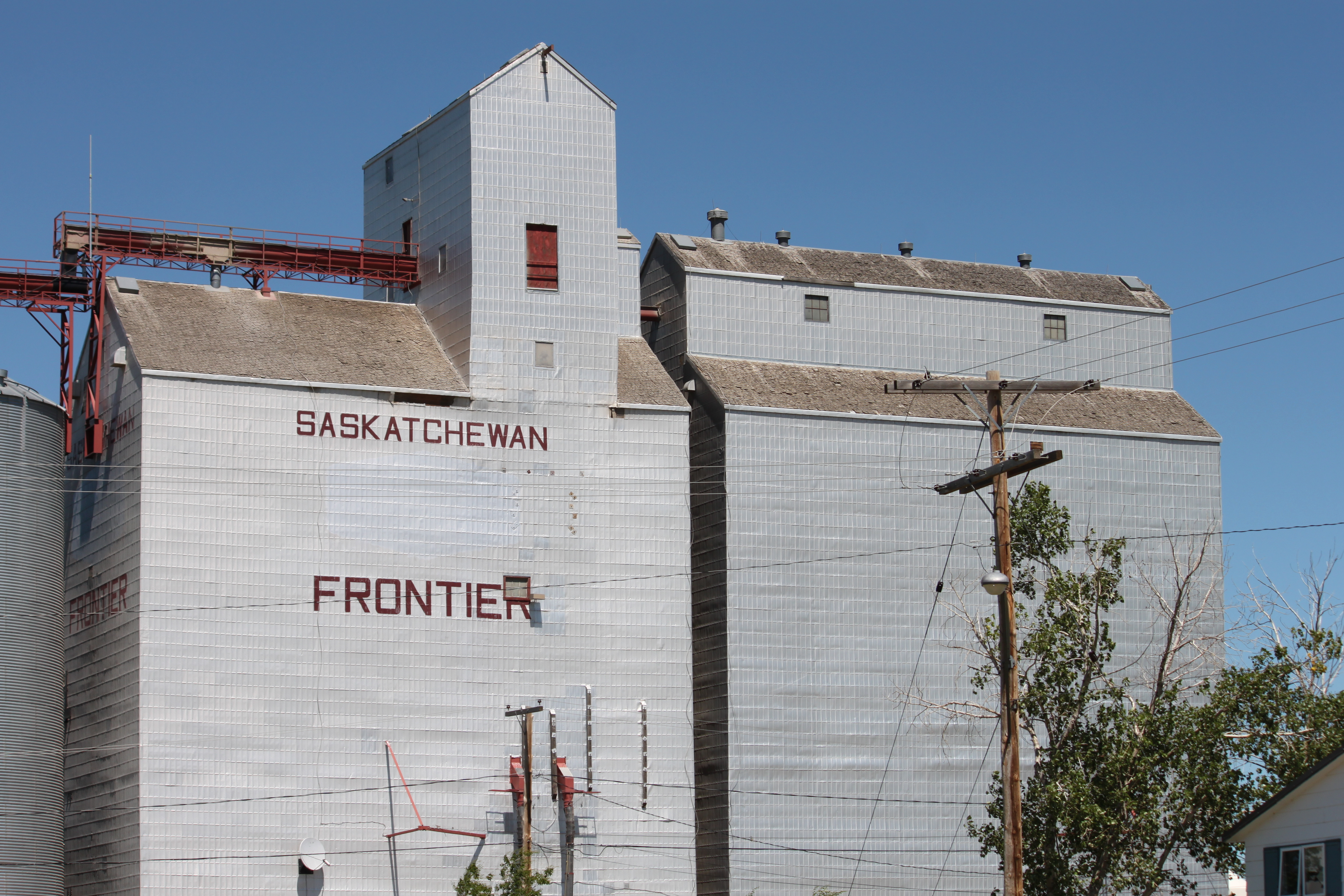
- Saskatchewan Wheat Pool Elevator in Frontier

- Location within Frontier No. 19 Location within Saskatchewan
- Coordinates: 49.199738°N 108.56703°W
- Country: Canada
- Province: Saskatchewan
- Region: Southwest
- Rural municipality: Frontier No. 19
- Post office Founded: 1917

Government
  - Type: Municipal
  - Governing body: Frontier Village Council
  - Mayor: Brady Berg
  - Administrator: Barb Webber
  - MLA: Doug Steele
  - MP: Jeremy Patzer

Area
  - Total: 0.93 km^{2} (0.36 sq mi)

Population (2021)
  - Total: 364
  - Density: 399.5/km^{2} (1,035/sq mi)
- Time zone: UTC-6 (CST)
- Postal code: S0N 0W0
- Area code: 306
- Highways: Highway 18 / Highway 613
- Railways: Great Western Railway
- Website: www.frontiersask.com

Frontier (2021 population: 364) is a village in the Canadian province of Saskatchewan within the Rural Municipality of Frontier No. 19 and Census Division No. 4. Frontier is on Highway 18 and is served by the Frontier Airport located 3.7 kilometres (2.3 mi) south of the village.

== History ==
The Frontier post office was founded in 1917. Frontier incorporated as a village on 10 July 1930.

== Demographics ==
Population history (1981–2016)
Year	Pop.	±%
1981	619	—
1986	483	−22.0%
1991	385	−20.3%
1996	309	−19.7%
2001	302	−2.3%
2006	283	−6.3%
2011	351	+24.0%
2016	372	+6.0%
2021	364	−2.2%
Source: Statistics Canada via Saskatchewan Bureau of Statistics

In the 2021 Census of Population conducted by Statistics Canada, Frontier had a population of 364 living in 152 of its 180 total private dwellings, a change of −2.2% from its 2016 population of 372. With a land area of 1.05 km^{2} (0.41 sq mi), it had a population density of 346.7/km^{2} (897.9/sq mi) in 2021.

In the 2016 Census of Population, the Village of Frontier recorded a population of 372 living in 159 of its 186 total private dwellings, a 5.6% change from its 2011 population of 351. With a land area of 0.93 km^{2} (0.36 sq mi), it had a population density of 400.0/km^{2} (1,036.0/sq mi) in 2016.

== Climate ==
Climate data for Frontier
Month	Jan	Feb	Mar	Apr	May	Jun	Jul	Aug	Sep	Oct	Nov	Dec	Year
Record high °C (°F)	13 (55)	19 (66)	23.5 (74.3)	30 (86)	35 (95)	37.5 (99.5)	39.5 (103.1)	38.5 (101.3)	35 (95)	32 (90)	23.5 (74.3)	13.5 (56.3)	39.5 (103.1)
Mean daily maximum °C (°F)	−5.2 (22.6)	−2.3 (27.9)	4.3 (39.7)	13.0 (55.4)	18.9 (66.0)	23.3 (73.9)	27.6 (81.7)	27.0 (80.6)	20.1 (68.2)	12.4 (54.3)	2.3 (36.1)	−3.1 (26.4)	11.5 (52.7)
Daily mean °C (°F)	−10.8 (12.6)	−8.1 (17.4)	−1.6 (29.1)	6.0 (42.8)	11.6 (52.9)	16.2 (61.2)	19.5 (67.1)	18.8 (65.8)	12.4 (54.3)	5.6 (42.1)	−3.1 (26.4)	−8.6 (16.5)	4.8 (40.6)
Mean daily minimum °C (°F)	−16.4 (2.5)	−13.9 (7.0)	−7.4 (18.7)	−1.1 (30.0)	4.3 (39.7)	9.1 (48.4)	11.3 (52.3)	10.5 (50.9)	4.8 (40.6)	−1.4 (29.5)	−8.5 (16.7)	−14.1 (6.6)	−1.9 (28.6)
Record low °C (°F)	−41.5 (−42.7)	−43 (−45)	−35 (−31)	−20.5 (−4.9)	−10.0 (14.0)	−2.0 (28.4)	3.0 (37.4)	−1.0 (30.2)	−11.5 (11.3)	−29.0 (−20.2)	−35.0 (−31.0)	−40.0 (−40.0)	−43.0 (−45.4)
Average precipitation mm (inches)	16.5 (0.65)	12.3 (0.48)	18.6 (0.73)	23.0 (0.91)	51.2 (2.02)	76.9 (3.03)	44.5 (1.75)	41.8 (1.65)	26.8 (1.06)	16.2 (0.64)	17.3 (0.68)	13.9 (0.55)	358.9 (14.13)
Source: Environment Canada

== Attractions ==
- Frontier & District Golf Course, a 9-hole facility located in Frontier
- Grasslands National Park, one of Canada's newer national parks, is located in southern Saskatchewan
- Cypress Hills Interprovincial Park, an interprovincial park straddling the southern Alberta–Saskatchewan border, located southeast of Medicine Hat

== Education ==
Frontier School offers Kindergarten through grade 12 and is in the Chinook School Division.

== Notable people ==
- Rhett Warrener, NHL player
- Braydon Coburn, NHL player
- David L. Anderson, former Conservative Member of Parliament

== See also ==
- List of communities in Saskatchewan
- List of villages in Saskatchewan
