= The Frontier (2014 film) =

- Premiere Release Poster
- Directed by: Matt Rabinowitz
- Written by: Matt Rabinowitz; Carlos Colunga
- Produced by: Jeffry A. DeCola
- Starring: Max Gail; Coleman Kelly; Anastassia Sendyk; Katherine Cortez; Oliver Seitz
- Cinematography: Adam Vollick
- Edited by: Tim Mirkovich
- Music by: Jason Yates
- Production companies: It's Terrific Pictures; Big E little e Productions
- Distributed by: Virgil Films and Entertainment
- Release dates: March 7, 2014 (SXSW premiere); May 5, 2015
- Running time: 89 minutes
- Country: United States
- Language: English

The Frontier is a 2014 American drama film directed by Matt Rabinowitz and written by Rabinowitz and Carlos Colunga. The film stars Max Gail, along with Coleman Kelly and Anastassia Sendyk.

The film premiered at SXSW on March 7, 2014. The film was released on May 5, 2015, by Virgil Films & Entertainment.

== Plot ==
An estranged son travels back home to confront his overbearing father to see if there is any relationship left between them.

Sean, a retired literature professor and civic activist, writes a letter to his estranged son, Tennessee, a ranch hand. Tennessee is uncertain how to respond, but knowing he should see his aging father, he decides to go home. Tennessee arrives just as Nina, Sean's personal trainer fresh off a bad breakup, accepts Sean's offer to move in and help him write his memoirs. The tension between father and son is ever-present. As Sean and Nina work, Tennessee avoids his overbearing father with fix-up projects around the house. One evening after Nina has gone out, Sean and Tennessee find themselves alone in the house for the first time.

== Cast ==
- Max Gail as Sean
- Coleman Kelly as Tennessee
- Anastassia Sendyk as Nina
- Katherine Cortez as Susan
- Oliver Seitz as Peter

== Release ==
The Theatrical Release was in New York City on September 12, 2014. The following week on September 19, 2014 the film opened in Los Angeles.

== Reception ==
Critical reception for The Frontier has been mixed and the film holds a rating of 40 on Metacritic based on 4 reviews, indicating mixed or average reviews. The Hollywood Reporter and the Village Voice both panned the film overall, with the Village Voice commenting that the arguing between Gail and Kelly's characters made things a bit too tense, stating that "Things improve considerably once both they and the film as a whole mellow out, as Rabinowitz handles reconciliation better than conflict, but the reprieve is short-lived."

=== Accolades ===
The film won the following awards:

- 2014 Best Feature Film award at the 1st annual Silver Springs International Film Festival.
- 2014 Best Drama award at the 34th annual Breckenridge Film Festival
- 2014 Best Actor in a Feature (Max Gail) at the 4th annual Massachusetts Independent Film Festival
- 2014 Best Actress award (Anastassia Sendyk) at the 5th annual NYC Independent Film Festival
- 2014 Best New Hampshire Feature award at the 14th annual New Hampshire Film Festival
