= Rudy Kraft =

Role-playing game designer

- Occupation: Game designer

Rudy Kraft III is a game designer who has worked primarily on role-playing games.

== Career ==
Steve Perrin and Rudy Kraft designed the RuneQuest (1978) mythical fantasy roleplaying game, which was set in the world of Glorantha that Greg Stafford had created, and published by Chaosium. Judges Guild obtained a license for RuneQuest and their first publication in the line was the adventure Broken Tree Inn (1979) by Kraft, which included material cut from Snake Pipe Hollow (1979) before Chaosium published that adventure, although Judges Guild removed all references to Glorantha before publication. Kraft and Jennell Jaquays (Note: Credited as Paul Jaquays.) wrote Adventures Beyond the Pass originally for Judges Guild, who never published it, so Greg Stafford instead published it through Chaosium as Griffin Mountain (1981). Kraft also contributed to Thieves' World (1981) from Chaosium. Kraft was one of the contributors to Citybook II: Port O' Call (1984) by Flying Buffalo.
