= SoloQuest 2: Scorpion Hall =

Tabletop fantasy role-playing game supplement

Scorpion Hall
SoloQuest 2
- Cover art by Rick Becker
- Designers: Alan LaVergne
- Publishers: Chaosium
- Publication: 1982; 43 years ago
- Genres: Fantasy
- Systems: Basic Role-Playing
- ISBN: 978-1-568820-84-2

SoloQuest 2: Scorpion Hall is a tabletop role-playing game adventure for RuneQuest. Originally published by Chaosium in 1982, it was republished in 2018 in PDF format as part of Chaosium's RuneQuest: Classic Edition Kickstarter. The republished edition, titled SoloQuest Collection contained the original adventure, plus SoloQuest and SoloQuest 3: The Snow King's Bride.

== Plot summary ==
SoloQuest 2: Scorpion Hall is an adventure which may be played as often as desired, even using the same player character.

== Publication history ==
SoloQuest 2: Scorpion Hall is the second solitaire adventure that was published for the RuneQuest role-playing game.

== Reception ==
Oliver Dickinson reviewed SoloQuest 2: Scorpion Hall for White Dwarf #40, giving it an overall rating of 8 out of 10, and stated that "there is nothing that a good GM or alert player could not pick up or decide upon, so far as I can see, and in general this should score highly on playability and enjoyment allows some scope for role-playing (including that of the NPCs, if you are playing solitaire), and offers a reasonable degree of complexity."

Steve List reviewed Scorpion Hall in The Space Gamer No. 63. List commented that "In general, Scorpion Hall is well-constructed and extremely challenging. It cannot be fully explored in any one session. While not infinite, it contains many sessions' worth of play value, and in the event a player does exhaust its possibilities (and probably a stable of characters in the process), it remains an extremely good guide for running a refereed adventure."

Trevor Graver reviewed Scorpion Hall for Imagine magazine, and stated that "Scorpion Hall is excellent value for money, and is a worthwhile investment for any RuneQuest player - for your money you get a 96-page solo adventure which provides a lot of scope for roleplaying (yes, even the bad guysl), a map for use with one of your own adventures (once you have finished the book, of course), and several new monsters to populate ·your world. If you see a copy, read it - if not, buy it!"
