= SoloQuest 3: The Snow King's Bride =

Tabletop fantasy role-playing game adventure

The Snow King's Bride
SoloQuest 3
- Cover art by Luise Perrene
- Designers: Alan LaVergne
- Publishers: Chaosium
- Publication: 1982; 43 years ago
- Genres: Fantasy
- Systems: Basic Role-Playing
- ISBN: 978-1-568820-84-2

SoloQuest 3: The Snow King's Bride is a tabletop role-playing game adventure for RuneQuest. Originally published by Chaosium in 1982, it was republished in 2018 in PDF format as part of Chaosium's RuneQuest: Classic Edition Kickstarter. The republished edition, titled SoloQuest Collection contained the original adventure, plus SoloQuest and SoloQuest 2: Scorpion Hall .

== Contents ==
SoloQuest 3: The Snow King's Bride is a solo adventure in which the player character must escort Brunhild the Boisterous through the mountains to her betrothed in Valhalavalla.

== Reception ==
William Peschel reviewed The Snow King's Bride in The Space Gamer No. 62. Peschel commented that "The Snow King's Bride is a worthwhile investment for those who want a solo adventure."

Oliver Dickinson reviewed SoloQuest 3: The Snow King's Bride for White Dwarf #42, giving it an overall rating of 8 out of 10, and stated that "I found this an extremely varied and enjoyable scenario, which could well provide an episode in the career of some favourite character."

Steve List reviewed The Snow King's Bride for Different Worlds magazine and stated that "The Snow King's Bride is an excellent adventure, one that puts a premium on thought and role-playing rather than mere exercise of brute force. Its quality, in terms of entertainment value, exploitation of the game system, and employment of the diverse body of knowledge of the RuneQuest universe, make it a standard to be emulated by subsequent designs."
