= SoloQuest =

Tabletop fantasy role-playing game supplement

Three Solo Adventures
- Cover art by Rick Becker
- Designers: Alan LaVergne
- Publishers: Chaosium
- Publication: 1982; 43 years ago
- Genres: Fantasy
- Systems: Basic Role-Playing
- ISBN: 978-1-568820-84-2

SoloQuest is a tabletop role-playing game adventure for RuneQuest. Originally published by Chaosium in 1982, it was republished in 2018 in PDF format as part of Chaosium's RuneQuest: Classic Edition Kickstarter. The republished edition, titled SoloQuest Collection contained the original three adventures, plus SoloQuest 2: Scorpion Hall and SoloQuest 3: The Snow King's Bride.

== Contents ==
SoloQuest is a supplement of three adventures for a solo player character: "DreamQuest," "Phony Stones," and "Maguffin Hunt."

== Reception ==
Forrest Johnson reviewed SoloQuest in The Space Gamer No. 55. Johnson commented that "SoloQuest is not the best solo adventure booklet around, but if you play RuneQuest there is not much competition."

Clive Bailey reviewed SoloQuest for White Dwarf #37, giving it an overall rating of 9 out of 10, and stated that "Overall, I found this adventure pack easy and enjoyable to play."

Anders Swenson reviewed SoloQuest for Different Worlds magazine and stated that "For a first book of solo adventures, Soloquest is a great success. Alan LaVergne has demonstrated a good grasp of solo adventure design, and the layout and typography provide an excellent setting for the well-written text. This book is highly recommended for all RuneOuest players."

Trevor Graver reviewed Soloquest for Imagine magazine, and stated that "Soloquest is a nice addition the Runequest family."
