= List of Judges Guild publications =

This is a list of products that were published by the game company Judges Guild.

== Board games ==
- Laser Tank

== Role-playing game adventures and supplements ==
=== DragonQuest ===
- Starsilver Trek

=== Empire of the Petal Throne ===
- The Nightmare Maze of Jigrésh

=== Fantasy role-playing game adventures ===
- The Caverns of Thracia
- Caves and Caverns
- Citadel of Fire
- Dark Tower
- The Dragon Crown
- Escape from Astigar's Lair
- F'Dech Fo's Tomb
- GenCon IX Dungeon
- Glory Hole Dwarven Mine
- Heroic Expeditions
- House on Hangman's Hill
- The Illhiedrin Book
- Inferno
- Lara's Tower
- The Maltese Clue
- Modron
- Of Skulls and Scrapfaggot Green
- Operation Ogre
- Ravenscrag
- Restormel
- Survival of the Fittest
- Sword of Hope
- Tegel Manor
- Temple of Ra Accursed by Set
- The Thieves of Fortress Badabaskor
- The Tower of Indomitable Circumstance
- Tower of Ulission
- The Treasure Vaults of Lindoran
- Trial by Fire
- Under the Storm Giant's Castle
- Zienteck

=== Fantasy role-playing game supplements ===
- The Book of Ruins
- The Book of Treasure Maps
- The Book of Treasure Maps II
- Campaign Hexagon System
- Castle Book I
- Castle Book II
- Character Chronicle Cards
- Character Codex
- City State of the Invincible Overlord
- City State of the World Emperor
- Dragon's Hall
- Dungeon Tac Cards
- Fantastic Personalities
- Fantastic Wilderlands Beyonde
- The Fantasy Cartographer's Field Book
- The First Fantasy Campaign
- Frontier Forts of Kelnore
- Judge's Shield
- Masters of Mind
- The Mines of Custalcon
- Portals of Irontooth
- Portals of Torsh
- Portals of Twilight
- Ready Ref Sheets
- Spies of Lightelf
- Temple Book I
- Treasury of Archaic Names
- The Unknown Gods
- Verbosh
- Village Book 1
- Village Book 2
- Wilderlands Hex Sheets
- Wilderlands of High Fantasy
- Wilderlands of the Fantastic Reaches
- Wilderlands of the Magic Realm
- World Map Set
- Wraith Overlord: Terror Beneath the City State

=== RuneQuest adventures ===
- Broken Tree Inn
- City of Lei Tabor
- Duck Pond
- Hellpits of Nightfang
- Legendary Duck Tower

=== Science fiction role-playing supplements ===
- Port O' Call: Tarlkin's Landing

=== Superhero: 2044 ===
- Hazard

=== Traveller adventures ===
- Amycus Probe
- Corsairs of the Turku Waste
- Darkling Ship
- Darthanon Queen
- Dra'k'ne Station
- Marooned on Ghostring
- Rogue Moon of Spinstorme
- Simba Safari
- Tancred

=== Traveller supplements ===
- The Astrogators Chartbook
- Crucis Margin
- Fifty Starbases
- Glimmerdrift Reaches
- Ley Sector
- Maranantha-Alkahest Sector
- Navigator's Starcharts
- Starships & Spacecraft
- The Traveller Logbook
- Traveller Referee Screen
- Waspwinter

=== Tunnels & Trolls ===
- The Toughest Dungeon in the World

=== Villains and Vigilantes ===
- Break In At Three Kilometer Island

== Magazines ==
- Pegasus

== Video games ==
- Trek-80
