= Kevin Siembieda =

Author, illustrator, game designer

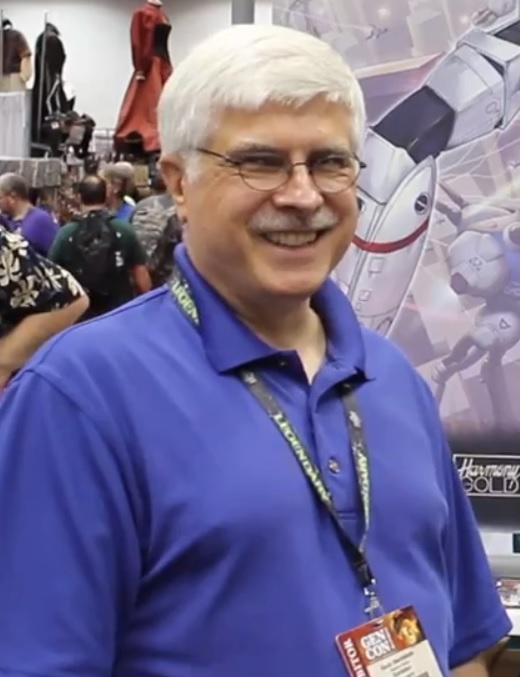
- Kevin Siembieda at Gen Con 2014
- Born: Kevin Henry Siembieda; April 2, 1956 (age 70); Detroit, Michigan, US
- Education: College for Creative Studies
- Occupations: Author; designer; illustrator; publisher of role-playing games at Palladium Books
- Years active: 1979–current
- Notable work: Heroes Unlimited; The Mechanoid Invasion; Palladium Fantasy RPG; Rifts
- Spouse: Maryann Donald (1985–2004)

Kevin Siembieda (born April 2, 1956) is an American artist, writer, designer and publisher of role-playing games.

== Career ==
Siembieda is a third-generation Polish American. He attended the College for Creative Studies in Detroit from 1974 to 1977. He wanted to work as a comic book artist, but found the industry difficult to break into and published a small-press comic (A+ Plus, 1977-1978) with his company, Megaton Publications. In 1979 Siembieda discovered the Dungeons & Dragons Basic Rulebook and joined a role-playing group, the Wayne Street Weregamers, which met at Wayne State University in Detroit (where he befriended Erick Wujcik, who ran the group). Siembieda ran a game for the group, the Palladium of Desires, a combination of AD&D and his house rules. By 1980 the Weregamers became the Detroit Gaming Centre, with Siembieda its assistant director and Wujcik its director. Siembieda tried to interest gaming companies in his RPG with little interest; only Judges Guild made him an offer, but he accepted an employment offer from them instead. He worked as an artist for Judges Guild for four months before working as a freelance artist for other publishers and trying to sell his RPG to them.

Siembieda is the co-founder and president of Palladium Books. He founded the company in April 1981 to publish his fantasy role-playing game, but had insufficient funds to publish any books; the mother of his friend Bill Loebs loaned Siembieda $1,500 to publish his first RPG book, The Mechanoid Invasion (1981). By 1983 the company was successful enough for Siembieda to rent warehouse space and release his fantasy RPG, the Palladium Fantasy Role-Playing Game with a loan of $10,000 from his friend Thom Bartold who had also loaned him funds to print the other two books in the Mechanoid Trilogy, Journey and Homeworld in 1982. These were not just loans, but investments, and Siembieda established a system of paying royalties not just to the writers and artists, but also to those who lent him the capital needed to print the books: his investors. The following year, he branched the Palladium system to the superhero genre with Heroes Unlimited. A freelancer contacted Siembieda about producing a licensed role-playing game based on the Teenage Mutant Ninja Turtles comic book, so Siembieda obtained the rights, but was dissatisfied with the supplement the freelancer produced; Erick Wujcik redesigned the game in five weeks, and it was published in 1985 as Teenage Mutant Ninja Turtles & Other Strangeness. Siembieda next obtained the license to publish a game based on the Robotech anime series, so he designed the Robotech role-playing game and published in 1986.

Siembieda wrote the RPG Rifts (1990) as a trade paperback in a two-column format which he laid out by hand. He supported Wujcik in founding his own company, Phage Press. In 1992, Siembieda sued Wizards of the Coast over its first RPG book, The Primal Order; GAMA president Mike Pondsmith helped the parties reach a compromise in March 1993. Siembieda also disagreed with White Wolf magazine and GDW over the coverage in their magazines regarding Palladium games. He demanded that websites devoted to Rifts and Palladium be taken down, believing that they violated his intellectual property, but eventually softened his stance in 2004. Siembieda fired Bill Coffin over editorial differences and dissatisfaction with the Rifts Coalition Wars that Siembieda and Coffin co-authored. He announced on April 19, 2006, that Palladium Books was approaching bankruptcy, due to a former employee who had embezzled from the company. Siembieda filed a lawsuit on May 7, 2010, against Trion Worlds for its MMORPG Rift: Planes of Telara, and a settlement was reached in October 2010. Role-playing games Siembieda has created include Palladium Fantasy Role-Playing Game (1983), Heroes Unlimited (1984), Robotech (1986), and Rifts (1990).

He is also an artist, and has occasionally illustrated Palladium Books products. Siembieda contributed art and cartography to several early Judges Guild products for the Dungeons & Dragons, RuneQuest and Traveller lines.

In 2015, he was inducted into the Origins Hall of Fame.

== Early illustration credits ==
=== Judges Guild ===
==== Dungeons & Dragons ====
- Nevins, Paul & Faust, Bill (October 1979). Verbosh. Dungeons & Dragons (D&D). Decatur, IL: Judges Guild. [JG 108]. - Front cover, interior art; maps (with B. Faust)
- Mayeau, Michael E. (1979). Operation Ogre. D&D. Decatur, IL: Judges Guild. [JG 109]. - Front cover; interior art (with Gerald Busby and Ed L. Perry)
- Hinnen, Bryan (1979). The Mines of Custalcon. D&D. Decatur, IL: Judges Guild. [JG 111]. - Front cover (with Ken Simpson and Rick Houser)
- Karczag, Paul (November 1979). The Maltese Clue. Advanced Dungeons & Dragons (AD&D). [JG 114]. - Interior art.
- Emigh, Dave (1980). The Sword of Hope. D&D. Decatur, IL: Judges Guild. [JG 118]. - Interior art (with Aaron Arocho, Michael D. Reagan and Jennell Jaquays)
- Emigh, D. (1980). Tower of Ulission. D&D. Decatur, IL: Judges Guild. [JG 119]. - Interior art (with A. Arocho, Bob Bingham and P. Jaquays)
- Pruehs, Allen V. & Pruehs, Ree Moorhead (1980). Escape from Astigar's Lair. AD&D. Decatur, IL: Judges Guild. [JG 124]. - Front cover; interior art (with P. Jaquays)
- Bledsaw, Bob & Hippenhammer, Creighton (1980). City State of the World Emperor. D&D. Decatur, IL: Judges Guild. [JG 150]. - Interior art (with P. Jaquays)
- Bledsaw, B.; Hippenhammer, C.; Kraft, Rudy & Miner, Clayton (1980). City State of the World Emperor—Book I: Map Guide. D&D. Decatur, IL: Judges Guild. [JG 155]. - Interior art (with P. Jaquays)
- Bledsaw, B.; Hippenhammer, C.; Kraft, R.; Miner, C. & Holmer, Mark (1980). City State of the World Emperor—Book II: Shops. D&D. Decatur, IL: Judges Guild. [JG 156]. - Interior art
- Bledsaw, B.; Hippenhammer, C.; Kraft, R.; Miner, C.; Holmer, M. & Hinnen, B. (1980). City State of the World Emperor—Book III: City. D&D. Decatur, IL: Judges Guild. [JG 157]. - Interior art (with P. Jaquays)
- Dale, Geoffrey O. (March 1980). The Treasure Vaults of Lindoran. AD&D. [JG 190]. - Front cover (with Bill Hadley); interior art (with P. Jaquays).
- Kraft, R. (1980). Portals of Torsh. AD&D. Decatur, IL: Judges Guild. [JG 260]. - Interior art (with Brian Wagner, David Allen, Robert Bledsaw Jr., and Carol Lind).
- Hinnen, B. (1980). Spies of Lightelf. D&D. Decatur, IL: Judges Guild. [JG 270]. - Interior art (with P. Jaquays)
- Jaquays, P. (1980). Wilderlands of the Fantastic Reaches. D&D. Decatur, IL: Judges Guild. [JG 300]. - Interior art (with P. Jaquays)
- Bledsaw, B. & Adams, Gary (1980). Modron. D&D (5th printing, 2nd ed.). Decatur, IL: Judges Guild. [JG 34]. - Interior art (with Pixie Bledsaw, E. L. Perry, and K. Simpson)
- Mayeau, M. E. (1980). The Dragon Crown. D&D (2nd printing, 1st ed.). Decatur, IL: Judges Guild. [JG 76]. - Interior art (with P. Jaquays)
- Blake, R. J. (1980). Of Skulls and Scrapfaggot Green. D&D (4th printing, 2nd ed.). Decatur, IL: Judges Guild. [JG 80]. - Interior art (with P. Jaquays)
- Kraft, R. (1981). Portals of Irontooth. AD&D. Decatur, IL: Judges Guild. [JG 560]. - Interior art (with K. Simpson, Erin McKee, A. Arocho and E. L. Perry)
- Mattson, John (1981). House on Hangman's Hill. AD&D. Decatur, IL: Judges Guild. [JG 670]. - Front cover; interior art (with E. McKee, E. L. Perry and K. Simpson)
- Kraft, R. (1981). Portals of Twilight. AD&D. Decatur, IL: Judges Guild. [JG 770]. - Interior art (with E. McKee, R. Houser, K. Simpson, Paul W. Vinton and the Sorcerer's Guild)

==== RuneQuest ====
- Kraft, R. (1979). Broken Tree Inn. RuneQuest. Decatur, IL: Judges Guild. [JG 107]. - Interior art (with P. Jaquays and A. Arocho)
- Nevins, P. & Faust, B. (1980). City of Lei Tabor. RuneQuest. Decatur, IL: Judges Guild. [JG 310]. - Front cover; interior art (with A. Arocho and B. Faust)
- Kraft, R. (1980). Duck Pond. RuneQuest. Decatur, IL: Judges Guild. [JG 380]. - Front cover

==== Traveller ====
- Nevins, P. & Faust, B. (1979). Dra'k'ne Station. Traveller. Decatur, IL: Judges Guild. [JG 105]. - Front cover; interior art (with P. Jaquays)
- Sering, Dave (1980). Tancred. Traveller. Decatur, IL: Judges Guild. [JG 330]. - Interior art (with A. Arocho and Peter Jenkins)
- Harm, Ray; Reagan, M. D. & Hauffe, Dan (1980). Darthanon Queen. Traveller. Decatur, IL: Judges Guild. [JG 340]. - Interior art (with P. Jenkins)

==== Universal Fantasy ====
- Wilson, Charles M. (1981). Masters of Mind. Decatur, IL: Judges Guild. [JG 690]. - Interior art (with K. Simpson and E. L. Perry)
- Mortimer, Edward R. G.; Mortimer, Diane & Mortimer, John (1982). Prey of Darkness. Decatur, IL: Judges Guild. [JG 840]. - Front cover; interior art (with R. Houser, P. Jaquays and J. Mortimer)
- Hinnen, B. (1982). Shield Maidens of Sea Rune. Decatur, IL: Judges Guild. [JG 1010]. - Interior art (with K. Simpson, J. Mortimer and P. W. Vinton)
- Hinnen, B. & Hauffe, D. (1982). Pirates of Hagrost. Decatur, IL: Judges Guild. [JG 1030]. - Back cover

==== Judges Guild Journal ====
- Anshell, Charles; Gooding, Penny, eds. (August–September 1979). "Judges Guild Journal". Judges Guild Journal. No. 16. Decatur, IL: Judges Guild. [JG 103]
- Anshell, C.; Gooding, P., eds. (October–November 1979). "Judges Guild Journal". Judges Guild Journal. No. 17. [JG 110] - Front cover, interior art.
- Anshell, C.; Gooding, P., eds. (December 1979 – January 1980). "Judges Guild Journal". Judges Guild Journal. No. 18. [JG 121] - Interior art
- Anshell, C.; Gooding, P., eds. (February–March 1980). "Judges Guild Journal". Judges Guild Journal. No. 19. [JG 160] - Front cover, interior art
- Anshell, C.; Bledsaw, Bob, eds. (April–May 1980). "Judges Guild Journal". Judges Guild Journal. No. 20. [JG 200] - Interior art

==== Dungeoneer Journal ====
- Anshell, C.; Reagan, Michael D., eds. (October–November 1980). "Dungeoneer Journal". Dungeoneer Journal. No. 23. Decatur, IL: Judges Guild. [JG 390] - Interior art.
- Anshell, C.; Reagan, M. D., eds. (December 1980 – January 1981). "Dungeoneer Journal". Dungeoneer Journal. No. 24. [JG 450] - Front cover, interior art
- Anshell, C.; Reagan, M. D., eds. (February–March 1981). "Dungeoneer Journal". Dungeoneer Journal. No. 25. [JG 470] - Front cover, interior art

==== Pegasus ====
- Reagan, M. D.; Anshell, C., eds. (June–July 1981). "Pegasus". Pegasus. No. 2. Decatur, IL: Judges Guild. [JG 610] - Interior art
- Reagan, M. D.; Anshell, C., eds. (August–September 1981). "Pegasus". Pegasus. No. 3. [JG 620] - Interior art
- Vinton, Paul W.; Mortimer, Edward R. G., eds. (February–March 1982). "Pegasus". Pegasus. No. 6. [JG 870] - Interior art
- Homer, Mark S., ed. (December 1982 – January 1983). "Pegasus". Pegasus. No. 11. [JG 1190] - Interior art
- Maddin, Mike, ed. (February–March 1983). "Pegasus". Pegasus. No. 12. [JG 1210] - Interior art

=== FASA ===
- Paley, Bill (1981). Action Aboard: Adventures on the "King Richard". Traveller. Chicago, IL: FASA. - Interior art (with William H. Keith Jr.)

=== TSR ===
- Fox, Gardner F. (August 1980). "Out of the Eons". In Mohan, Kim (ed.). Dragontales: An Anthology of All-New Fantasy Fiction. Lake Geneva, WI: TSR / Dragon Publishing. pp. 21–30. ISBN 978-0-394-52271-5. (interior art)

== Palladium role-playing games ==
- The Mechanoid Invasion (April 1981)
- Palladium Fantasy Role-Playing Game (July 1983)
- Heroes Unlimited (August 1984)
- Teenage Mutant Ninja Turtles & Other Strangeness (September 1985)
- Robotech (November 1986)
- Beyond the Supernatural (October 1987), with Randy McCall
- Robotech II: The Sentinels (September 1988)
- Rifts (August 1990)
- Macross II (July 1993)
- Rifts Chaos Earth (June 2003)
- Dead Reign (November 2008), with Josh Hilden and Joshua Sanford
- SPLICERS RPG (2004) written by Carmen Bellaire with addition text by Kevin Siembiada
- Nightbane (1995) written by CJ Carella, with addition text by Kevin Siembieda
