= F'Dech Fo's Tomb =

Tabletop role-playing game adventure

F'Dech Fo's Tomb is a 1981 fantasy role-playing game adventure published by Judges Guild.

== Contents ==
F'Dech Fo's Tomb is a collection of adventure scenarios in set locations, with a tomb consisting of five rooms, two venues containing a treasure, and one with a lich.

== Reception ==
Lewis Pulsipher reviewed F'Dech Fo's Tomb in The Space Gamer No. 52. Pulsipher commented that "Even at [a lower price], this booklet is a waste of money."

== See also ==
- Glory Hole Dwarven Mine, 1981
- Heroic Expeditions, 1981
- Lara's Tower, 1981
