= Darkling Ship =

Science-fiction role-playing game supplement

Darkling Ship is a 1982 fantasy role-playing game adventure published by Judges Guild for Traveller.

== Plot summary ==
Darkling Ship is an adventure in which the player characters serve as the crew of the commando transport Hrunta and search for a 25 million-ton generation ship.

== Publication history ==
Darkling Ship was the third adventure published as part of the Border Prowler series, after the adventures Amycus Probe and Rogue Moon of Spinstorme. Darkling Ship was written by Dave Sering and was published in 1982 by Judges Guild as a 32-page book.

== Reception ==
William A. Barton reviewed Darkling Ship in The Space Gamer No. 63. Barton commented that "If you don't mind adding some extra encounters, etc. during the exploration of the vessel, Darkling Ship may be salvageable - and could even be turned into an interesting adventure. However, I hope the next in the series (yes, there are loose ends left in the one, too) will have a bit more action in the offering."
