= Corsairs of the Turku Waste =

Science-fiction role-playing game supplement

Corsairs of the Turku Waste is a 1982 role-playing game adventure published by Judges Guild for Traveller.

== Plot summary ==
Corsairs of the Turku Waste is an adventure set in the Gateway Quadrant, primarily in a mapped area in the Crucis Margin and in other locations within the quadrant.

== Publication history ==
Corsairs of the Turku Waste was written by Dave Sering and was published in 1982 by Judges Guild as a 32-page book.

== Reception ==
William A. Barton reviewed Corsairs of the Turku Waste in The Space Gamer No. 52. Barton commented that "Corsairs of the Turku Waste stands, along with Simba Safari, as one of Judges Guild's best Traveller adventures since Tancred."
