= The Dragon Crown =

Tabletop role-playing game adventure

- Authors: Michael Mayeau
- First published: 1978

The Dragon Crown is an adventure for fantasy role-playing games published by Judges Guild in 1979.

== Plot summary ==
The Dragon Crown is a scenario that was originally used as the 1978 Pacific Encounters D&D tournament dungeon. The player characters are held captive by a red dragon, who offers to free them in exchange for reclaiming the Dragon Crown from the kobolds who stole it.

The Dragon Crown is an adventure intended for 6 player characters of experience levels 1st-4th. The characters must enter a dungeon to recover a crown belonging to a Red Dragon who threatens to eat them if they fail. The dungeon has 26 rooms, each of which has a short description and is keyed.

== Publication history ==
The Dragon Crown was written by Michael Mayeau, with a cover by Jennell Jaquays (Note: Credited as Paul Jaquays.), and was published by Judges Guild in 1979 as a 16-page book.

== Reception ==
Don Turnbull reviewed The Dragon Crown for White Dwarf #14, and rated it a 5 out of 10. He commented that "It is quite a short, straightforward single-dungeon-level adventure which should be capable of completion in 4-5 hours play." Turnbull continued by describing the rooms: "Their occupants are mainly Kobolds – in one sense a good idea to stock rooms with the same types of monster since in a tournament the teams could go in different ways to their objective, but this will make for dull repetitive play in other contexts." He added that: "Though the presentation is pretty good, there are quite a lot of spelling/printing errors which are annoying, and a few odd 'rules' with which I would take issue. First we have the old hoary fireball business – the damage handed out is divided by the number of recipients; so take that cage of white mice with you. Then we have the concept of hits being cured by bandaging, which seems a trifle odd. To open a secret door, a roll is made against the character's intelligence; I could grand this for finding it, but once you have found a secret door, the fact that you have found it and identified it as such means you already have an idea how to open it, and brute strength is probably all that is required from then on. Also, to detect nature of traps, characters roll against wisdom; surely intelligence?? Well, you don't have to adopt these 'rules'." Turnbull also reviewed Of Skulls and Scrapfaggot Green along with The Dragon Crown, and concluded his review by saying, "Neither of these products are up to the standard of the TSR modules, either in design quality or presentation. However they are by no means of poor quality [...] At the price, they represent reasonable value for money."

Patrick Amory reviewed The Dragon Crown for Different Worlds magazine and stated that "the dungeon is just about the most unimaginative place I have ever seen - half the rooms are populated by Kobolds! Probably one of the Guild's worst releases."

Lawrence Schick commented in his book Heroic Worlds: "Sound easy? Remember, these are kobolds a dragon doesn't want to tangle with."
