= The Mines of Custalcon =

Tabletop role-playing game supplement

- Cover
- Genre: Role-playing game
- Publisher: Judges Guild
- Media type: Print

The Mines of Custalcon is a supplement for fantasy role-playing games published by Judges Guild in 1979.

== Contents ==
The Mines of Custalcon is a campaign setting supplement focusing on a wilderness area, which supplies appropriate encounter tables, descriptions of villages, and a short dungeon adventure.

== Publication history ==
The Mines of Custalcon was written by Bryan Hinnen, and was published by Judges Guild in 1979 as a 48-page book.

As part of Judges Guild's increased production, they began a new series of City State-related supplements. The Mines of Custalcon (1979) kicked off their "Wilderness Series" which mapped the areas around the City State using Judge Guild's Campaign Hexagon System.

== Reviews ==
- Different Worlds #6 (Dec 1979)
