= Campaign Hexagon System =

1977 Dungeons & Dragons book guide

- Cover
- Genre: Role-playing game
- Publisher: Judges Guild
- Media type: Print

Campaign Hexagon System is a book guide published by Judges Guild in 1977 for the Dungeons & Dragons game.

== Contents ==
Campaign Hexagon System is a 1977 book published by Judges Guild for use as an accessory with the Dungeons & Dragons game.

Campaign Hexagon System is a supplement for gamemasters containing blank hexagon sheets with bigger gray hexes printed over them to allow the gamemaster to use them for wilderness terrain at different scales. The book also contains tables to allow the gamemaster to generate terrain for the wilderness.

Campaign Hexagon System is a booklet presenting more than 60 blank hex grids. Each page contains a rectangular hexagonal tessellation consisting of roughly 1000 small hexes, with a large hex superimposed over this grid to represent a distance of 5 miles across flat land. The booklet includes additional guidelines to assist with a fantasy wilderness campaign, such as rules for Keen Sighting, Hydrographic Terrain (such as rivers and streams), Movement Obstacles, Prospecting (for valuable materials such as ore or precious minerals), Flora Types, Vegetables, and Fauna Classifications.

== Publication history ==
Campaign Hexagon System was written by Bob Bledsaw and Bill Owen, and was published by Judges Guild in 1977 as a 64-page book. A listing of cumulative sales from 1981 shows that Campaign Hexagon System sold over 20,000 units.

== Reception ==
Don Turnbull reviewed Campaign Hexagon System for White Dwarf #6. He commented that "This is a useful booklet of records for those involved in a fantasy 'wilderness' campaign game". Turnbull concluded his review by saying, "Though I am not personally involved in 'outdoor' fantasy gaming at the moment, I should have thought this to be a most valuable source of reference data for player and gamemaster alike."

Patrick Amory reviewed Campaign Hexagon System for Different Worlds magazine and stated that "In the front are useful and extraordinarily detailed charts for determining types of flora and fauna, just which way that stream bends, and the exact depth of that gorge - all with adjustments for latitude. This play-aid will be incomparably useful to all serious GMs."

Shannon Appelcline called the Campaign Hexagon System (1977) a "clever gamemaster aid, this one a set of blank hex maps that gamemasters could use to portray large wilderness areas. It pushed Judges Guild's ideas of large-scale campaigns — something that they alone in the industry were concentrating on at the time — and matched the campaign hexes that they used to depict the lands around their City State."

== Reviews ==
- The Playboy Winner's Guide to Board Games

== See also ==
- Wilderness Hex Sheets
