= Treasury of Archaic Names =

Catalyst (role-playing game supplements)

Treasury of Archaic Names is a 1978 role-playing game supplement published by Judges Guild.

== Contents ==
Treasury of Archaic Names is a supplement containing lists of names that have been keyed to numbers that can be rolled on percentile dice to generate names randomly.

== Publication history ==
Shannon Appelcline explains that as Judges Guild grew, Bill Owen's time was strained between the company and his family travel business, so Owen ended his business relationship with Bob Bledsaw in March 1978 and "Owen effectively sold his shares to Bledsaw, though he remained on a consultancy contract for a few years so that Bledsaw could spread out the payment. During this time, Owen authored Judges Guild's Treasury of Archaic Names (1979) and prepared a few documents for Bledsaw" before leaving the company.

Appelclein also noted that "Early in 1999 Judges Guild, led by Bob Bledsaw, returned on the web" and began selling products from the original Judges Guild and "Afterward Judges Guild took the same path as many other first-generation RPG publishers in the d20 age: they became a licensor", and "Their first partner was RPGRealms / QuickLinkInteractive. QLI reprinted just two books during the two years that they held the license — Dark Tower (2001) and The Treasury of Archaic Names (2001)".

== Reception ==
Steve Jackson reviewed Treasury of Archaic Names in The Space Gamer No. 33. Jackson commented that "Not much use to players who don't also referee. Recommended for referees who take their naming serious – it'll be worth the investment."
