= Frontier Forts of Kelnore =

Role-playing game

- Cover of 1st printing
- Genre: Role-playing game
- Publisher: Judges Guild
- Media type: Print

Frontier Forts of Kelnore is a licensed supplement published by Judges Guild in 1978 for the fantasy role-playing game Dungeons & Dragons.

== Contents ==
This D&D supplement posits that the ancient kingdom of Kelnore guarded its borders with various forts, all of them based on one of three modular designs. Since the disappearance of the kingdom, these forts have fallen into disrepair and have been inhabited by various monsters. Frontier Forts of Kelnore allows a gamemaster to create a ruined castle within their D&D campaign and then, using supplied tables, randomly populate it with traps, treasure and monsters taken from TSR publications.

Cover of 2nd printing

== Publication history ==
Shortly after the publication of D&D by TSR, Judges Guild received permission from TSR to create licensed "player aids" for the fantasy role-playing game. Frontier Forts of Kelnore, written by Dave Sering, and featuring art by Sering and Jennell Jaquays, was published in 1978 as a 32-page book with a simple sketch on the cover. The following year, Judges Guild released a second printing featuring full-color artwork on the cover.

== Reception ==
Writing for Portals, Scott Craig called this supplement "Thoroughly organized and profusely illustrated." Craig noted that it contained three different-sized castle maps as well as "a system that lets the DM populate them with a variety of traps, treasure and creatures". He concluded with a strong recommendation, saying, "One of the best [supplements] that I have seen in a while. This is a must!"

== Other recognition ==
A copy of Frontier Forts of Kelnore is held in the collection of the Strong National Museum of Play (object 110.2765).
