= Spies of Lightelf =

Tabletop role-playing game supplement

- Genre: Role-playing game
- Publisher: Judges Guild
- Media type: Print

Spies of Lightelf is a supplement for fantasy role-playing games published by Judges Guild in 1980.

== Contents ==
Spies of Lightelf is a campaign setting supplement, designated Wilderness Book Two for the Wilderlands Project, which details the wilderness area known as Lightelf.

== Publication history ==
Spies of Lightelf was written by Bryan Hinnen, with a cover by Jennell Jaquays (Note: Credited as Paul Jaquays.), and was published by Judges Guild in 1980 as a 48-page book with a cover sheet.

== Reception ==
William Fawcett reviewed Spies of Lightelf in The Dragon #44. Fawcett commented that "This release adds a good deal of detail to the Wilderlands campaign and gives insight into an otherwise minor corner of the map. This is an area that a party is likely to pass through or even possibly winter in."
