= Character Codex =

Tabletop role-playing game supplement

- Cover
- Genre: Role-playing game
- Publisher: Judges Guild
- Media type: Print

Character Codex is a supplement for fantasy role-playing games published by Judges Guild in 1979.

== Contents ==
Character Codex is a players' aid, a book of character record sheets, each with an illustration portraying a character of the appropriate class. It also includes an equipment price list.

== Publication history ==
Character Codex features art by Jennell Jaquays (Note: Credited as Paul Jaquays.), and was published by Judges Guild in 1979 as a 96-page book.

TSR extended Judges Guild's license to include Advanced Dungeons & Dragons in 1978, which allowed Judges Guild to produce many more products in that line, beginning with the Character Codex (1979).
