= GenCon IX Dungeon =

- Authors: Bob Blake
- First published: 1978

GenCon IX Dungeon is an adventure for fantasy role-playing games published by Judges Guild in 1978.

== Plot summary ==
GenCon IX Dungeon is an adventure set in a Celtic mythos world, in which the player characters must explore Baldemar Castle to retrieve the Staff of Albalon.

== Publication history ==
GenCon IX Dungeon was written by Bob Blake, and was published by Judges Guild in 1978 as a 32-page book.

== Reception ==
Lawrence Schick in his book Heroic Worlds calls this "a classic early tournament dungeon".

== Reviews ==
- The Playboy Winner's Guide to Board Games
