= The Traveller Logbook =

Science-fiction role-playing game supplement

- Cover by Jennell Jaquays. (Note: Credited as Paul Jaquays.)
- Designers: Dave Sering
- Publishers: Judges Guild
- Publication: 1979; 46 years ago
- Genres: Science-fiction
- Systems: Classic Traveller

The Traveller Logbook is a 1979 science fiction tabletop role-playing game supplement, written by Dave Sering, and with art by Jennell Jaquays, and published by Judges Guild for Traveller.

== Contents ==
The Traveller Logbook is a supplement that includes record sheets to log information for up to 10 characters such as their UPPs, skills, equipment, service records, names, and ranks, and the booklet also contains summary sheets for six starships, and the majority of the charts needed for creating characters for Traveller.

== Publication history ==
The Traveller Logbook was written by Dave Sering and was published in 1979 by Judges Guild as a 64-page book.

== Reception ==
Bob McWilliams reviewed The Traveller Logbook for White Dwarf #15, giving it an overall rating of 9 out of 10, and stated that "the first section alone is probably worth the price."

William A. Barton reviewed The Traveller Logbook in The Space Gamer No. 32. Barton commented that "The Traveller Logbook is well worth the price. In fact, no serious Traveller player should be without one."
