= Hellpits of Nightfang =

Tabletop fantasy role-playing game adventure

- Cover by Jennell Jaquays (Note: Credited as Paul Jaquays.)
- Designers: Jennell Jaquays
- Publishers: Judges Guild
- Publication: 1979; 46 years ago
- Genres: Fantasy
- Systems: Basic Role-Playing

Hellpits of Nightfang is an adventure published by Judges Guild in 1979 for the fantasy role-playing game RuneQuest.

== Description ==
Hellpits of Nightfang is a low-level "gateway" adventure for beginning players. The 32-page book leads the characters to limestone caves located beneath a series of sinkholes. The tomb of a powerful RuneLord is there, but a vampire with a love of gold has made a lair nearby, and vermin have surrounded his home.

== Publication history ==
Chaosium published the fantasy role-playing game RuneQuest in 1978. The following year, Judges Guild released a RuneQuest adventure, Hellpits of Nightfang, written by Jennell Jaquays, who also created the cover art for the 32-page book.

In April 1984, Minnesota Baptist minister Larry Forsberg introduced a motion at a local Republican county convention to ban fantasy role-playing games in public schools, using Hellpits of Nightfang as an example of the "satanic" games he was trying to ban.

== Reception ==
In Issue 32 of The Space Gamer, Forrest Johnson commented "It is not easy to find fault with this supplement [...] A good little adventure, easily worth [the price]." Johnson
