= Inferno (Judges Guild) =

- Authors: Geoffry O. Dale
- First published: 1980

Inferno is an adventure for fantasy role-playing games published by Judges Guild in 1980.

== Plot summary ==
Inferno is an adventure scenario intended for player characters of levels 10-14, which takes place in the first four circles of Hell as detailed in the works of Dante, with statistics for new devils. This module adapts the encounters from the first four rings of the Inferno.

== Publication history ==
Inferno was written by Geoffry O. Dale, with illustrations by Kevin Siembieda, and was published by Judges Guild in 1980 as a 64-page book.

This adventure was planned as the first half of a set and describes only the first four circles of the inferno. The second part of the set was planned to be released in late 1980. The introduction of the module credits Dante and notes that the Archdevils in the original Monster Manual were placed in the incorrect circles of Hell. The sequels that were planned to detail the lower levels were never published by Judges Guild.

In 2014, Spellbook Games released Inferno: Journey through Maleboge, by Paul Elkmann and Geoffrey O. Dale, a three book set that revised and completed the original Judges Guild adventure. This revision includes all nine circles as described by Dante.

== Reception ==
Ron Shigeta reviewed the adventure in The Space Gamer No. 31. He commented that this adventure "is for those that have gotten cursed scrolls saying, "Go to Hell!!" or owe a Geas to some Lawful Good cleric. Hell is everything it's cracked up to be. Not just anybody can dash in and out of this place. As a matter of fact, it would be the achievement of a character's career to get out alive, as it should be. Everything is covered, from Tiamat's cave to the palace of Minos – and nothing is easy; both new and old Devils and monsters abound here." He continued: "But not everything is as it should be. Minos' Palace has 13 rooms and Tiamat's cave has four paragraphs, where it should have a book of its own. Often a description of some new magical item will take up more room than the overall description of the level it's on. Usually the only major encounters are those on the road through, leaving the rest of the circle one big random encounter area." Shigeta concluded the review by saying, "I bought Inferno because I wanted the plane of 9 Hells in my campaign and didn't have the time to do it myself. Anybody who wants to spend a few weeks on it can probably do as well or better, and with the gaps in Book 1, I feel little confidence in the forthcoming book 2, which contains the remaining five levels, the infernal City of Dis, all the Monster Manual Arch-Devils, and the only way off the plane .... Perhaps Mr. O'Dale should be playing Napoleon instead."

Inferno was reviewed in Dragon #44 (December 1980) by William Fawcett. He commented that "This is one of the more expensive and longest modules offered by Judges Guild. It is a mixed offering with some excellent points and some potential problems. Many DMs will like this module just because it is perhaps the one situation where they can validly play with Asmodeus as a wandering monster!" Regarding the commentary on TSR's placement of the archdevils, he stated that "Actually there is support for both placements; the argument harkens back to the days of the “angels on a pin” discussions. Depending on their sources, both authors have them placed correctly (or relatively, incorrectly). In any case this is of little importance to the play as most characters will be reluctant to face any of the Archdevils anyhow." Fawcett added: "Obviously, this is a very high-level dungeon. A party of no fewer than eight members and averaging no less than 10th to 14th level is suggested. Even for these levels, this is a very deadly place. This puts a strain on the judge; there is a fine line between playing this module well and playing it either so deadly as to be discouraging or crossing over into Monty Haul dungeoning. [...] This can lead to a party that is terribly over-encumbered with new major magic items." He continued "Another problem inherent with playing characters and monsters who are this high in levels is that it takes a long time to resolve most melees. Either the characters have a lot of hit points or the more complicated magics take longer to roll up and compute. Several new spells are also suggested for use in the module, many of which would unbalance a campaign when (or if) the characters return. Even with these problems this module can be a real experience if played with a capable DM. There are some excellent descriptions in the early sections that set the mood beautifully for the players. The DM is further aided by suggestions throughout the book on how to play certain situations. These, for the most part, are quite useful. The module handles encountering and generating high-level monsters very well." Fawcett concluded his review by saying, "If you are looking for something that will challenge players who have characters grown to great heights or are looking for a suitable ground to play high-level characters as a change, this is an excellent choice. This is definitely not a module for a new DM to attempt, but correctly run it offers an unusual challenge."
