= Modron (Judges Guild) =

Tabletop role-playing game adventure

- Authors: Bob Bledsaw and Gary Adams
- First published: 1978

Modron is an adventure for fantasy role-playing games published by Judges Guild in 1978.

== Plot summary ==
Modron is an adventure scenario which details the village of Modron and includes an underwater adventure that takes place near the village, with a large map for the village and adventure. The book presents encounters for both the village and underwater area.

The city of the water goddess Modron survived when her worshippers battled the worshippers of her rival god Proteus. While the homes of the Proteus worshippers were destroyed, they constructed a new city over the ruins, which still hold wealth and the promise of adventures. The adventure briefly describes several characters that the playerscan use if they choose.

== Publication history ==
Modron was written by Bob Bledsaw and Gary Adams, and was published by Judges Guild in 1978 as a 16-page digest-sized book with a blue cover and two large maps. Judges Guild published a second edition in 1980.

A cumulative sales listing shows that Modron sold over 15,000 units by 1981.

== Reception ==
Elisabeth Barrington reviewed Modron in The Space Gamer No. 30. Barrington commented that "The graphics on the maps are excellent. The ideas presented in the background are interesting and novel, to some extent. Clarity is the key word in this module. Whatever is described is organized and easy to read." However, she added "BUT there is not much described. In each room or place the characters go, the DM must quickly invent a few things to flesh out the descriptions given in the booklet. There are people in the places, and a couple of items, and that is all that is given. No room descriptions, no special traps or interesting things that happen unless you make them up as you go along; just a person or monster and some items. There are some bad typos in the booklet, making things a little hard to figure out at times, but the great organization of the book makes up for that one little problem." Barrington concludes her review by saying, "If you are the type of DM who wants the bare minimum provided for your campaign, this is for you. But you might find that [the price] is a little high to pay for descriptions of people. It is fun to play, and there are some new things to find, but I do not think it is worth the price."

William Fawcett reviewed Modron in The Dragon #44. Fawcett commented that "This set is inexpensive and has some good expansions of ideas mentioned, but not detailed, in earlier Guild products. Modron could be easily included in a campaign that included nothing else from the Guild."

== Reviews ==
- Different Worlds #8 (Jun 1980)
- Papyrus (Issue 9 - 1993)
