= Under the Storm Giant's Castle =

- Authors: Thomas McCloud
- First published: 1979

Under the Storm Giant's Castle is an adventure for fantasy role-playing games published by Judges Guild in 1979.

== Contents ==
Under the Storm Giant's Castle is a scenario for high-level characters set in and under a castle in the clouds. It includes new magic items.

== Publication history ==
Under the Storm Giant's Castle was written by Thomas McCloud, with art by Jennell Jaquays (Note: Credited as Paul Jaquays.), and was published by Judges Guild in 1979 as a 32-page book.

== Reception ==
Don Turnbull reviewed Under the Storm Giant's Castle for White Dwarf #17, and rated it a 5 out of 10. Turnbull commented: "In general, the module is not so closely worked as it might have been and though it provides for an unusual type of adventure in an unusual setting it could have been developed much more".

== Reviews ==
- Different Worlds #6 (Dec 1979)
