= The Book of Treasure Maps =

Fantasy role-playing supplement (published 1979)

- Cover
- Genre: Role-playing game
- Publisher: Judges Guild
- Media type: Print

The Book of Treasure Maps is a supplement for fantasy role-playing games published by Judges Guild in 1979.

== Contents ==
The Book of Treasure Maps is a supplement which contains five short dungeon scenarios that the player characters find using treasure maps. Each of these dungeons includes a hand-drawn map to be given to the players as well as a complete map of the dungeon for the gamemaster to use.

The Book of Treasure Maps presents five treasure maps that connect with scenarios involving dungeon settings. These locales appear in the world on maps that have been published by Judges Guild, but gamemasters can place them in their own world. "The Lost Temple" consists of two moderately difficult levels; "The Tomb of Aethering the Damned" is one level; "The Lone Tower" is a more difficult dungeon with multiple levels; "Willchidar's Well" consists of three small moderately difficult levels; and "The Crypts of Arcadia" is a large one-level dungeon maze.

== Publication history ==
The Book of Treasure Maps was written by Jennell Jaquays, (Note: Credited as Paul Jaquays.) and was published by Judges Guild in 1979 as a 48-page book.

== Reception ==
Elisabeth Barrington reviewed The Book of Treasure Maps in The Space Gamer No. 29. Barrington commented that "Each scenario comes with plenty of background information, accompanying rumors, maps for characters and the DM, and a wide variety of nasties. Well-written, it is easy to read and figure out. The maps appear in imaginative places - such as written in moon runes on a +1 shield - and are very clear. All five are easily placed anywhere the DM desired; he is not limited by the JG's own worlds. They are good for one campaign apiece, but if one wishes, they may be continued." She continued, "There is little to criticize about this book. The Book of Treasure Maps assumes a working knowledge of the D&D system, but that is about all." Barrington concludes her review by saying, The Book of Treasure Maps I recommend to almost any player who wished a good example of a one-night campaign set-up, whether he had his own campaign world or not; whether he had been playing two weeks or two years."

Patrick Amory reviewed Book of Treasure Maps for Different Worlds magazine and stated that "All of the dungeons are a lot of fun and well worked out, even in the small space available. This book probably gives the most value for the money of the Guild play-aids, each dungeon providing a good two hours of solid play."

Jonathan Tweet reviewed The Book of Treasure Maps for Different Worlds magazine and stated that "The Book of Treasure Maps [...] is an imaginitive piece of work at a low price. The determiner of the book's value to a gamemaster is how well the adventure's settings and rules would fit into the gamemaster's own campaign and how much work he or she is willing to do in adapting what is provided. If you have a compatible campaign, imagination, and a little free time, I recommend this book."

== Reviews ==
- Gryphon #2 (Fall 1980)
