= The Thieves of Fortress Badabaskor =

- Authors: Marc Summerlott, Bob Bledsaw, Mike Petrowsky, Craig Fogel, Bill Owen, and Tony Floren
- First published: 1978

The Thieves of Fortress Badabaskor is an adventure for fantasy role-playing games published by Judges Guild in 1978.

== Contents ==
The Thieves of Fortress Badabaskor is an adventure scenario that takes place in the five-level dungeon lair inhabited by brigands. The higher levels of the dungeon are intended for low-level player characters, while the lower levels are a more difficult challenge intended for higher-level characters. The adventure also presents a description of a new evil deity.

== Publication history ==
The Thieves of Fortress Badabaskor was written by Marc Summerlott, Bob Bledsaw, Mike Petrowsky, Craig Fogel, Bill Owen, and Tony Floren, and was published by Judges Guild in 1978 as a 32-page book.

A cumulative sales listing shows that The Thieves of Fortress Badabaskor sold over 15,000 units by 1981.

== Reception ==
Don Turnbull reviewed The Thieves of Fortress Badabaskor for White Dwarf #7. Turnbull commented: "This is an excellent package, and particularly inexpensive – buy it without further delay!"

Patrick Amory reviewed Thieves of Fortress Badabaskor for Different Worlds magazine and stated that "Yet another fairly early release, Thieves will be good for many hours of solid, typical D&D."

== Reviews ==
- The Playboy Winner's Guide to Board Games
