= Judge's Shield =

1977 role-playing game gamemaster's screen

- Gamemaster's side of the three-panel screen
- Genre: Role-playing game
- Publisher: Judges Guild
- Media type: Print

Judge's Shield is a gamemaster's screen created by Judges Guild in 1977 for the fantasy role-playing game Dungeons & Dragons, the first such screen to be published.

== Contents ==
Judge's Shield is a gamemaster's screen that was designed for use with TSR's new role-playing game Dungeons & Dragons. It was designed to be placed between the gamemaster and the players in order to preserve the secrecy of the gamemaster's information as well as hiding any dice rolls made by the gamemaster. Judge's Shield was the first gamemaster's screen to be sold commercially.

== Publication history ==
Judge's Shield was published by Judges Guild in 1977 as three cardstock sheets. The three pieces of 8.5" x 11" cardstock were designed to be taped together to form a three-panel screen, the two outer pieces in a vertical (portrait) orientation, and the middle piece in a horizontal (landscape) orientation. This design allowed the gamemaster to peer over the lower middle section more easily. The Judge's Shield had tables on both sides of the screen, with information relevant to the players on their side, and information for the gamemaster on the other side. Information included "Attack matrices with minus armor classes, saving throws, weapons' strikes & damages, weapon priority, phantasmal forces, encounters, experience points & levels, monster compendium of statistics." The Judge's Shield proved to be a popular item, and less than a year after it was introduced, it had become the second best-selling product for Judges Guild.

Judges Guild began its publication of original materials with a subscription format, and the Judges Shield (1977) was the first original item that they produced outside of their subscription system — following their reprints of the City State and Ready Ref.

In 1979, Judges Guild also produced a gamemaster screen for Game Designers' Workshop's science fiction role-playing game Traveller, and followed this with a version for RuneQuest in 1980.

== Reception ==
Don Turnbull reviewed The Judge's Shield for White Dwarf #3. Turnbull commented: "These panels contain virtually all the information needed for DM and players during a game, and moreover are much more durable than the Ready Ref Sheets. Unless you have made up your own, an essential for any serious DM."

== Reviews ==
- The Playboy Winner's Guide to Board Games
