= Laser Tank (disambiguation) =

The Laser Tank is a fictional vehicle in the Space 1999 television series.

Laser Tank may also refer to:

- 1K17 Szhatie, Soviet laser tank
- LaserTank, a 1995 computer puzzle game
- Laser Tank (board game), a 1980 board game published by Judges Guild
