= Duck Pond (Judges Guild) =

Tabletop fantasy role-playing game adventure

- Cover by Kevin Siembieda
- Designers: Rudy Kraft
- Publishers: Judges Guild
- Publication: 1980; 45 years ago
- Genres: Fantasy
- Systems: Basic Role-Playing

Duck Pond is a 1980 fantasy role-playing game adventure published by Judges Guild.

== Contents ==
Duck Pond is a dungeon adventure featuring one hundred rooms.

The book is an RQ2 Gateway adventure scenario set in a village that was destroyed by the cult that worships the evil Mallia. It also includes encounters for the surrounding area.

The adventure includes personalized monsters and unusual objects.

== Publication history ==
Duck Pond was written by Rudy Kraft, with a cover by Kevin Siembieda, and was published by Judges Guild in 1980 as a 64-page book with a cover sheet.

It is a supplement for RuneQuest for two or more players.

== Reception ==
Forrest Johnson reviewed Duck Pond in The Space Gamer No. 36. Johnson commented that "A fine adventure, though not as polished as Duck Tower."
