= Operation Ogre (Judges Guild) =

- Authors: Michael Mayeau
- First published: 1979

Operation Ogre is an adventure for fantasy role-playing games published by Judges Guild in 1979.

== Contents ==
Operation Ogre is the official 1979 Pacificon AD&D tournament dungeon. The player characters must free an elven princess captured by the Ice Ogres. It describes an alchemist's laboratory in detail.

== Publication history ==
Operation Ogre was written by Michael Mayeau, with a cover by Kevin Siembieda, and was published by Judges Guild in 1979 as a 32-page book.

== Reception ==
Don Turnbull reviewed Operation Ogre for White Dwarf #17, and rated it a 5 out of 10. Turnbull commented: "the module itself isn't all that bad. Deliberately limited in scope so that eight teams could 'run' through it individually, with a maximum of four hours playing time each, it is built for speed and is a blood-and-guts dungeon in style rather than belonging to the problem-solving, more intellectually demanding type".

== Reviews ==
- Different Worlds #6 (Dec 1979)
