= Survival of the fittest (disambiguation) =

Survival of the fittest is a metaphor related to the biological theory of evolution.

Survival of the Fittest may also refer to:

== Books ==
- Survival of the Fittest (novel), by Jonathan Kellerman, 1997
- Survival of the Fittest, a book by Mike Stroud, 1998
- Survival of the Fittest, a book in The Hardy Boys Casefile Series, 1997

== Music ==
- Survival of the Fittest (album), 1975 album by The Headhunters
- Survival of the Fittest Live, a live album, or the title song, by The Amboy Dukes, 1971
- "Survival of the Fittest" (song), by Mobb Deep, 1995
- "Survival of the Fittest", a song by Fredo, 2019
- "Survival of the Fittest", a song by Herbie Hancock from Maiden Voyage, 1965
- "Survival of the Fittest", a song by MC Lyte from Eyes on This, 1989
- "Survival of the Fittest", a song by the Hollies from Confessions of the Mind (Moving Finger), 1970

== Television ==
- Survival of the Fittest (TV series), a British reality series
- ROH Survival of the Fittest, an annual professional wrestling tournament held by Ring of Honor

=== Episodes ===
- "Survival of the Fittest", an episode on the television series The 100
- "Survival of the Fittest" (Doctors), 2003
- "Survival of the Fittest", an episode of the Japanese documentary series Miracle Planet
- "Survival of the Fittest" (Shameless), 2013
- "Survival of the Fittest", an episode of The Six Million Dollar Man
- "Survival of the Fittest" (The Spectacular Spider-Man)
- "Survival of the Fittest" (Supernatural)

== Other uses ==
- Survival of the Fittest (Judges Guild), a 1979 role-playing game adventure
- Survival of the Fittest (Shadowrun), a 2002 role-playing game adventure
- Survival of the Fittest & Klein’s Story, a pair of audio dramas based on the television series Doctor Who
