= Portals of Irontooth =

Tabletop role-playing game supplement

- Cover
- Genre: Role-playing game
- Publisher: Judges Guild
- Media type: Print

Portals of Irontooth is a supplement for fantasy role-playing games published by Judges Guild in 1981.

== Contents ==
Portals of Irontooth is a campaign setting supplement, set on a fantasy world that characters can travel to using a magical portal. It provides a brief summary of the world of Irontooth and the creatures of its wilderness, with additional detail for the towns of Port Iron Bottom and Gnome Home. The book contains two pages of color maps.

Portals of Irontooth is a supplement which explores an iron-rich area of the world Hnoon. The colony of Irontooth and its surrounding regions have been built atop refined iron rather than bedrock. Swamps and mountains have rust flakes, while the native creatures known as the Irontooths have metal skins and are immune to magic directly applied to them.

== Publication history ==
Portals of Irontooth was written by Rudy Kraft, with art by Kevin Siembieda, and was published by Judges Guild in 1981 as a 48-page book.

Portals of Irontooth is the second supplement released for the Portals series, depicting adventure sites which have been connected to each other through a series of interplanetary or interdimensional portals for teleportation; Portals of Torsh, was the first scenario in the series.

== Reception ==
Aaron Allston reviewed the adventure in The Space Gamer No. 52. He commented that Portals of Irontooth was better than its predecessor, Portals of Torsh, and felt that the creatures being immune to direct applications of magic "makes this adventure interesting for magicians and clerics – they have to use their brains in creature encounters. This adventure is not a specific quest or set of encounters – it is a region with inhabitants spelled out, history detailed, and scenarios suggested. Adventurers can explore, hunt, interact with the human settlers or regional inhabitants, or whatever, without being dragged towards an inevitable specific encounter or end. On the production end, the text is professionally typeset, the booklet features several color pages, and the artwork is pretty good." He continues: "That last generalization does not extend to the cover, which is unappealing and unanatomical. Portals was cleanly typeset, but lacks editing. Admittedly, this problem doesn't get in the way of the adventure; I simply have a bias against the consistent mangling of the English language." Allston concluded the review by saying, "This scenario is competently written, packaged, and presented, and offers opportunities for entertaining play. The slice-at-a-time feel to this series doesn't promote in-depth adventures in any single setting, but neither does it prevent it. I recommend Portals of Irontooth to scenario buyers."
