= Verbosh =

Tabletop role-playing game supplement

- Cover
- Genre: Role-playing game
- Publisher: Judges Guild
- Media type: Print

Verbosh is a supplement for fantasy role-playing games published by Judges Guild in 1979.

== Contents ==
Verbosh is a campaign setting supplement that details a city and the area around it, presenting encounters and short adventure scenarios set both in dungeons and underwater.

== Publication history ==
Verbosh was written by Paul Nevins and Bill Faust, and was published by Judges Guild in 1979 as an 80-page book.

== Reception ==
Anders Swenson reviewed Verbosh for Different Worlds magazine and stated that "Verbosh is a campaign, and is a good example of how the isolated dungeon can be easily integrated into an expanded setting. The two cities are nice to have on tap, as they are considerably less overwhelming than the great City States provided by Judges Guild. The book provides a good value for its price in sheer quantity and quality of game material. I enjoyed Verbosh, and I believe the serious GM who wants a good adventure framework will find it a good investment."

Patrick Amory reviewed Verbosh for Different Worlds magazine and stated that "If you can ignore Kevin Siembieda's embarrassingly poor, repetitive and sexist art, Verbosh can perhaps help many GMs who are perplexed as to how to set up a good wilderness adventure."
