= City State of the World Emperor =

Role-playing game supplement

- Cover
- Genre: Role-playing game
- Publisher: Judges Guild
- Media type: Print

City State of the World Emperor is a supplement for fantasy role-playing games published by Judges Guild in 1980.

== Contents ==
City State of the World Emperor is a campaign setting supplement which details the ancient city of Viridestan and its nearby area in three books: "City" (80 pages), "Shops" (80 pages), and "Guidebook to Map 6" (Wilderness Map 6). The supplement presents the history, background, guidelines for rules, a new character class, and three maps, as well as game statistics for every non-player character in each location.

City State of the World Emperor is a supplement that builds on the series of maps by Judges Guild that were meant to link together, describing the appearance, politics, and important non-player characters in a city state that can be used as part of adventures.

== Publication history ==
City State of the World Emperor was written by Creighton Hippenhammer and Bob Bledsaw, and was published by Judges Guild in 1980 as 3 books (two of which were 80 pages, the other 48 pages), three large maps, and a cover sheet.

A cumulative sales listing shows that City State of the World Emperor sold over 20,000 units by 1981.

== Reception ==
Ron Pehr reviewed The City State of the World Emperor in The Space Gamer No. 34. Pehr commented that

What we have here is a big-time, industrial-grade playing aid... It does an excellent job. Unless you play all day every day, it will be a long time before your players can fully explore every facet of the City State of the World Emperor (CSWE). The city map itself is larger than that of their previous City State of the Invincible Overlord, and my players haven't exhausted it in 4 years. The CSWE's territories have plenty of interesting terrain ruled by formidable characters.

...On the negative side, many of the areas are described in only a sketchy paragraph, some of the descriptions of NPCs and their environs seem to have been drawn up at random, and that beginning referees who introduce some of the overpowering NPCs and magic artifacts that are 'on the list' will either overwhelm player-characters or provide too many goodies too soon (a general fault with D&D anyhow).

...CSWE does accomplish what it set out to do. It provides a relatively complete background world, with exquisite detail in places, and unending ideas for development of a referee's own world. The price is high, but you get a lot of material for it.

Patrick Amory reviewed City-State of the World Emperor for Different Worlds magazine and stated that "City-State of the World Emperor is vast, its sheer bulk will provide years of play. The detail is tremendous, and far surpasses anything else on the market. It will, however, require much work on the GM's part to safely build it into a good campaign."

Lawrence Schick in his book Heroic Worlds states that "If you think quantity is quality, this is for you."

== Reviews ==
- Different Worlds #8 (Jun 1980)
- Gryphon #1 (Summer 1980)
- Gryphon #3 (Spring 1981)
