= Wilderlands of High Fantasy =

Role-playing game supplement

- Cover
- Genre: Role-playing game
- Publisher: Judges Guild
- Media type: Print
- Followed by: Fantastic Wilderlands Beyonde
- Judges Guild Product Code: [JG 48]

Wilderlands of High Fantasy is a supplement for fantasy role-playing games published by Judges Guild in 1977. It is part of the same world as their earlier City State of the Invincible Overlord setting materials.

== Contents ==
Wilderlands of High Fantasy is a campaign setting supplement which details the locations found on five large wilderness maps of the setting (Wilderlands Maps 1-5).

The regions described are as follows: City State of Invincible Overlord (#1), Barbarian Altantis (#2), Glow Worm Steppes (#3), Tarantis (#4), and Valon (#5) and are shown in full detail on the judge's maps and are roughly sketched out on the players' maps. The booklet describes and gives the location of many of the villages, castles, islands, ruins, relics, and monsters.

== Publication history ==
Wilderlands of High Fantasy was written by Bob Bledsaw and Bill Owen, and was published by Judges Guild in 1977 as five large maps (judge and player versions), a 12-page booklet, and a 16-page booklet. Later releases included one 32-page book and (2 versions each) of five large maps (judge and player versions).

Judges Guild initially operated on a subscription model to their customers, and after several other installments, they compiled their installments N and O into the Wilderlands of High Fantasy supplement, which presented the world of the City State to players. A listing of cumulative sales by Judges Guild from 1981 shows that Wilderlands of High Fantasy sold over 15,000 units.

In June 2002 Judges Guild announced that they had formed a partnership with Necromancer Games, which would release products from Judges Guild beginning in 2003. Necromancer soon after began by advertising their plan to publish Wilderlands of High Fantasy and City State of the Invincible Overlord, ultimately publishing large collectors' editions of City State of the Invincible Overlord (2004) and Wilderlands of High Fantasy (2005). The setting was then used as a locale for a multitude of modules and characters published by Judges Guild.

== Reception ==
Don Turnbull reviewed Wilderlands of High Fantasy for White Dwarf #6, and commented that "It is good, and well worth the money, particularly if you are a 'fantasy campaign' fan."

In a review of the d20 version of Wilderlands of High Fantasy in Black Gate, John ONeill said "the crown jewel of the new Judges Guild was a massive and gorgeous box set, a limited-run compilation that has become one of the most collectible RPG releases of the 21st Century: the Wilderlands of High Fantasy."

In his 2023 book Monsters, Aliens, and Holes in the Ground, RPG historian Stu Horvath noted, "the interesting legacy of Wilderlands in 1977 isn't its coming role as a building block for bigger campaign settings. No, whats keen about Wilderlands is all of the wonderful random tables ... These kinds of tables, of which the ones in Wilderlands are the earliest, function as tool kits for the GM, providing creative prompts and, given enough of them, a framework for creating large swaths of material for a game session with just a few dice rolls."

== Reviews ==
- The Playboy Winner's Guide to Board Games
