= Heroic Expeditions =

Heroic Expeditions is a 1981 fantasy role-playing game adventure published by Judges Guild.

== Contents ==
Heroic Expeditions is an adventure supplement which consists of three separate scenarios with each intended for a specific set of character types: "Spear of Darkness," "Quest for the Book of Ancestry," and "Cave of Despair".

== Reception ==
J. David George reviewed Heroic Expeditions in The Space Gamer No. 50. George commented that "Any of these three quests could have been interesting, were they given more background and published separately in a more complete form. "Cave," the best of the three, can only be described as almost clever. For the most part, even novice referees would be better off designing their own quests than using those presented in Heroic Expeditions."

== See also ==
- Tower of Ulission, 1980
- Lara's Tower, 1981
- Caves and Caverns, 1982
