= Fifty Starbases =

Science-fiction role-playing game supplement

Fifty Starbases is a 1981 role-playing game supplement for Traveller published by Judges Guild.

== Contents ==
Fifty Starbases is a supplement containing charts, tables and descriptions intended to provide details for landing spots on various planets, including the services, equipment and personnel most likely to be available there.

== Publication history ==
Fifty Starbases was published in 1981 by Judges Guild as a 96-page book.

== Reception ==
William A. Barton reviewed Fifty Starbases in The Space Gamer No. 43. Barton commented that "I'm afraid I must give Fifty Starbases a qualified recommendation. The information section on starports is quite useful, as will be some of the maps, if you don't mind paying [the price] for the package and being able to use less than half the book, pick up a copy."
