= Wilderlands Hex Sheets =

Role-playing game supplement

- Cover
- Genre: Role-playing game
- Publisher: Judges Guild
- Media type: Print

Wilderlands Hex Sheets is a supplement for fantasy role-playing games published by Judges Guild in 1977.

== Contents ==
Wilderlands Hex Sheets is an aid for gamemasters in the form of hex maps for preparing maps to be used with wilderness scenarios.

== Publication history ==
Wilderlands Hex Sheets was published by Judges Guild in 1977 as four large map sheets and a cover sheet.

A cumulative sales listing shows that Wilderlands Hex Sheets sold over 20,000 units by 1981.
