= The Fantasy Cartographer's Field Book =

The Fantasy Cartographer's Field Book is a 1980 role-playing game supplement published by Judges Guild.

== Contents ==
The Fantasy Cartographer's Field Book is a supplement that presents four different types of grids for maps, each with pages explaining how to record the scale, contents, and key.

== Reception ==
Elisabeth Barrington reviewed The Fantasy Cartographer's Field Book in The Space Gamer No. 31. Barrington commented "If there are any avid gamers who don't need this book, I would like to meet them. [...] The publishers even suggest using these pages for submitting your designs for publication. And as some of the pages in each type of grid will reproduce, you don't need to go out and buy several packages of graph paper and hex paper. You can make your own."
