= Citadel of Fire =

Adventure for fantasy role-playing games

- Authors: Marc Summerlott and Bob Bledsaw
- First published: 1978

Citadel of Fire is an adventure for fantasy role-playing games published by Judges Guild in 1978.

== Plot summary ==
Citadel of Fire is an adventure scenario intended for high-level player characters that takes place in a five-level dungeon located under the castle of a wizard.

Citadel of Fire is an adventure set in the Wizard's Tower consisting of 6 tower floors and a large 5-level dungeon. The adventure details each of the rooms and other features and includes a brief historical note to assist the Dungeon Master in determining how to run the scenario.

== Publication history ==
Citadel of Fire was written by Marc Summerlott and Bob Bledsaw, and was published by Judges Guild in 1978 as a 32-page book.

A cumulative sales listing shows that Citadel of Fire sold over 15,000 units by 1981.

== Reception ==
Don Turnbull reviewed Citadel of Fire for White Dwarf #9, and rated it a 6 out of 10. He commented that "Seeing – and being enormously impressed by – the recent TSR modules has rather spoiled me! In fact the outstanding quality of the TSR modules puts others into perspective as presentable, workable settings but not blessed with the thorough and meticulous approach which a product of outstanding quality must possess. The designer has done a workmanlike job, but I can't help feeling that there should by now be a number of 'amateur' designers who regularly produce scenarios of equal quality for the limited audience of their own players – things have progressed a great deal since Judges' Guild material first came on the market, yet the products of the Guild have remained at about the same quality level." He continued by saying "To a novice designer – particularly one not yet ready for the sophisticated, complexity and toughness of the TSR Modules [...] this will be a useful addition to the collection and a helpful guide to design. To those who can now count themselves as veterans this may appear as rather run-of-the-mill with little to justify the cost. For the player, it is quite a simple dungeon/setting to explore apart from the areas containing the Demons". Turnbull concluded his review by saying, "A useful product but not one which can now attract the praise which would have been heaped on it two years ago."

Patrick Amory reviewed Citadel of Fire for Different Worlds magazine and stated that "This one is another of the Guild's earlier releases. Based on an evil wizard's tower, it is a typical D&D adventure, with nothing special to single it out from the crowd. A competent GM should be able to turn out one of these with his eyes closed."
