= Port O' Call: Tarlkin's Landing =

Tabletop role-playing game supplement

Port O' Call: Tarlkin's Landing is a 1981 science-fiction role-playing game supplement published by Judges Guild.

== Contents ==
Port O' Call: Tarlkin's Landing details a starport city with non-player characters, a black-and-white map representing the city with building plans on a grid on the other side, and a guidebook with more information.

== Publication history ==
Port O' Call: Tarlkin's Landing is the first role-playing aid from Judges Guild as part of a series intended as universal science-fiction RPG aids.

== Reception ==
William A. Barton reviewed Port O' Call: Tarlkin's Landing in The Space Gamer No. 49. Barton commented that "Tarlkin's Landing is, unfortunately, one of those 'universal' supplements that doesn't quite fit any system. Still, if the conversion problems, the price, and other liabilities don't bother you, you probably will find Tarlkin's Port O' Call of some use."

Doug Houseman reviewed Port O' Call: Tarlkin's Landing for Different Worlds magazine and stated that "This product will probably take the average game master longer to convert to his campaign than would starting from scratch. Judges Guild states that this is the first in a series of starports, one can only hope that more time and effort is invested in the rest of the series."
