= Masters of Mind =

Tabletop role-playing game supplement

Masters of Mind is a 1981 fantasy role-playing game supplement published by Judges Guild for any role-playing game.

== Contents ==
Masters of Mind is a supplement which presents basic psychic abilities for characters, which are used to develop skills.

== Reception ==
Ronald Pehr reviewed Masters of Mind in The Space Gamer No. 48. Pehr commented that "If you can forgive the sloppy physical presentation, and want a coherent, intriguing set of rules for including psychic powers in a role-playing game, Masters of Mind works, and works well. If you don't like the psionic rules you're using, or aren't using any, Masters of Mind is definitely what you need."

Michael Stackpole reviewed Masters of Mind in The Space Gamer No. 50. Stackpole commented that "Obviously, the author assumed that any game this was used with would have more than one attribute governing intelligence. [...] RuneQuest, TFT, T&T and Stormbringer all only have one attribute to define brains. Another case of 'any RPG' really meaning D&D."

Anders Swenson reviewed Masters of Mind for Different Worlds magazine and stated that "Masters of the Mind is a complex, consistent expansion of the available rules simulating organically-based mind-over-matter type powers. A GM interested in expanding this portion of the Psionics rules in a campaign could make good use of this material, especially if paranormal powers were intended to dominate. the game. The rules are lengthy, and both comprehensive and complicated, suffering from bad organization, not at all alleviated by the layout or typography. The rules hold together, but it is very hard to find important details in unrelated parts of the text. This is a useful supplement for a GM who wants an expansion of the D&D approach to psionic powers for his campaign, but may not prove to be a good investment for others."
