= Temple of Ra Accursed by Set =

Role-playing game supplement

- Authors: Thomas McCloud and Edward McCloud
- First published: 1979

Temple of Ra Accursed by Set is an adventure for fantasy role-playing games published by Judges Guild in 1979.

== Plot summary ==
Temple of Ra Accursed by Set is an adventure scenario intended for high-level player characters which takes place in an abandoned temple desecrated by evil beings. The adventure was designed to be played using miniatures.

Temple of Ra, Accursed by Set is an adventure in which the player characters explore a magically-built temple dedicated to the god Ra, trying to find the Princess Rukmini of Hindustan and free her from Set. The characters will encounter guardians serving Set, such as the Gorgriffspidrascorp, as well as Hindustani creatures looking for the princess as well.

== Publication history ==
Temple of Ra Accursed by Set was written by Thomas McCloud and Edward McCloud, and was published by Judges Guild in 1979 as a 16-page book.

== Reception ==
Elisabeth Barrington reviewed the adventure in The Space Gamer No. 28. She states that "Temple of Ra is well-organized and fairly complete. The rooms are all described in almost minute detail. Less experienced DMs will have little to worry about except playing the game. Almost all possible contingencies have been planned for." She continued, "Drawbacks include the scale of the map, high levels of the monsters compared to the characters, and extra materials needed for play. The scale (on graph) is one meter per square. This may work for some DMs, but is very awkward for most. the levels of the monsters (10th-level guards, and three Type V Demons) seem a bit high for the suggested second-level characters to handle. And to fully understand the intricacies of the creatures in the temple, the DM needs 3 to 5 of the AD&D supplements." Barrington concluded her review by stating, "For the skilled DM, the Temple of Ra is a decent dungeon. However, the problems listed above and the fact that there is little room left for the DM's imagination make it less than amusing to play."

Patrick Amory reviewed Temple of Ra Accursed by Set for Different Worlds magazine and stated that "Although the basic idea is interesting (a good temple of Ra, cursed by the evil god Set), it wasn't applied very well. The author, working with his son, developed a method of building the dungeon out of Brix Blox; otherwise it makes for some difficult mapping."

Lawrence Schick in his book Heroic Worlds calls the adventure "Terrible" and notes that one of the new monsters in the book is "the beloved gorgriffspidrascorp".
