= The Treasure Vaults of Lindoran =

Tabletop role-playing game adventure

- Authors: Geoffrey O. Dale
- First published: 1980

The Treasure Vaults of Lindoran is an adventure for fantasy role-playing games published by Judges Guild in 1980.

== Plot summary ==
The Treasure Vaults of Lindoran is an adventure scenario intended for high-level player characters who must defeat the traps and defenses protecting the treasure of the Elven King. The book details the history of both the elves and drow, and presents statistics for new monsters.

The Elf-King of Lindoran sealed his treasures within his vault when he went off to war a thousand years ago and he never came back. He placed repulsion spells on the vault to prevent anyone without the counterspell from entering, although these spells have weakened over time, so the player characters may be able to enter if they can pass the red dragon who waits outside.

In this adventure the characters loot an ancient treasure vault of the elves, whose the exits can only be used by characters that have successfully gained the treasure. The book provides a detailed history about the Elves, Undead, and Drow. Some new monsters were created for this dungeon and appear extensively within.

== Publication history ==
The Treasure Vaults of Lindoran was written by Geoffrey O. Dale, with art by Kevin Siembieda, and was published by Judges Guild in 1980 as a 32-page book. Geoffry O. Dale is the pen name used by Paul Elkmann.

== Reception ==
Elisabeth Barrington reviewed the adventure in The Space Gamer No. 29. She commented that "The Treasure Vaults of Lindoran has an interesting new feature: 'special skeleton and zombie guards' which are cleric-immune, along with lots of magic mouths. Each room is nicely details, and written so that anyone could convert it into his own system. If the characters use their brains, they can find their way to more treasure than they could carry. She noted, "It is advisable to play higher-level characters in this campaign, as some of the nasties are more so than usual. There are some really bad typos; however, this is just a detail. All the walls prevent Teleportation- and ESP-related spells; this drastically reduces a magic-user's barrage of spells." Barrington concluded her review by saying, "If you like really tough AD&D challenges, this is for you; if not, wait a while."

The Treasure Vaults of Lindoran was reviewed in Dragon #44 (December 1980) by William Fawcett. He stated that "This AD&D module is one of the highest quality offerings from the Guild in recent months. It can stand well against most modules offered by any company." He commented on the presentation: "The quality of the room descriptions is high. The art by Kevin Siembieda is excellent and adds to the text in several places. Several other good drawings are included, but they don't seem to relate directly to the module. [...] The maps are clear, but suffer from a lack of a grid or scale. These maps are also spread out among the pages of the booklet and so are not always accessible quickly. This is common to most of Judges Guild's modules and seems inferior in style to placing maps on separate pages which can be kept constantly in sight, even while reading." Fawcett concluded his review by saying, "There are many tricks and traps defending the vault. Most are entertaining, challenging and lend interest to DMing the module. A few are rather nasty in that there aren't any clues or likely choices to guide the party. You may want to include some hints for these to make encounters with them less dependent on luck. There are 30 pages of adventuring in this module (not 34, as stated on the cover) and whether for actual use or just for the ideas, this module will please most buyers."

== Reviews ==
- Different Worlds #8 (Jun 1980)
- The Necromancer #1 (May 1982)
