= Restormel (Judges Guild) =

Role-playing game supplement

Restormel is a 1981 fantasy role-playing game adventure published by Judges Guild for any role-playing game.

== Contents ==
Restormel is a universal supplement for fantasy role-playing games that presents a village and a map.

== Publication history ==
Restormel was written by Scott Fulton, and published by Judges Guild in 1981 as a 32-page book with two large two-color maps.

== Reception ==
Michael Stackpole reviewed Restormel in The Space Gamer No. 50. Stackpole commented that "There is no 'armor class' in Tunnels and Trolls, The Fantasy Trip, RuneQuest, Stormbringer, or most other games. Also, their NPC descriptions omit the attribute Power, which makes the work useless of RuneQuest" and noted that the description as a Universal Fantasy Supplement means "For AD&D but we couldn't get the approval? Billing it as universal is not quite ethical."
