= Dragon's Hall =

1981 role-playing game supplement

- Cover
- Genre: Role-playing game
- Publisher: Judges Guild
- Media type: Print

Dragon's Hall is a supplement for fantasy role-playing games published by Judges Guild in 1981.

== Contents ==
Dragon's Hall includes a solo dungeon scenario for character levels 1-2. It was designed for one player with one to four characters.

== Publication history ==
Dragon's Hall was written by Jim Simon, and was published by Judges Guild in 1981 as a 16-page book.

== Reception ==
Lewis Pulsipher reviewed the adventure in The Space Gamer No. 54. Pulsipher commented: "The game is not suited to solo play for two reasons. First, low-level characters are two easy to kill or incapacitate. Second, the first-level Sleep spell is too powerful, but other spells are too weak or too variable of effect to be woven into a solo dungeon." He continued: "Simon then tries to get around the vulnerability problems by allowing up to four adventurers – most solos accommodate only one. He also allows spell-casters (most solos do not), with a limited choice of spells, but Sleep and Cure are included (even if the character can't normally use Sleep), so that a smart player will almost certainly take only these spells. Moreover, I noticed no case in which any magic spell other than Sleep would have approached its effectiveness, nor were any clerical spells other than Cure of much use." Pulsipher added: "Although the introduction warns that low-level characters are sometimes better off running than fighting, in cases where a fight option is given, it almost always fails. In other cases it is not even offered. Because of this, and because the adventurers are trapped in the dungeon by a cave-in, with only one way out located at an unknown and distant place, they must fight through most of the monsters in the dungeon in order to leave. I can't imagine any party of second-levels, let alone firsts, likely to survive this test." He commented "Although paragraphs have a number-letter designation, as in most solos, the number does not correspond to the page number. The editorial failure to re-number paragraphs is inexcusable. It certainly increases the tedium associated with the paragraph-finding method." Pulsipher concluded his review by saying, "With nothing particularly imaginative to recommend it, and marks against it such as indifferent layout, poor word-to-cost ratio, and the unsuitability of AD&D to solo dungeons, I cannot recommend Dragon's Hall at this price, even to those who like solos."
