= Rogue Moon of Spinstorme =

Science-fiction role-playing game supplement

Rogue Moon of Spinstorme is a 1981 role-playing game adventure published by Judges Guild for Traveller.

== Plot summary ==
Rogue Moon of Spinstorme is an adventure set in the Spinstorm system in which the crew of the ship Hrunta seek the aliens who built the base that was discovered in the adventure Amycus Probe.

== Publication history ==
Rogue Moon of Spinstorme was written by Dave Sering and was published in 1981 by Judges Guild as a 32-page book. Rogue Moon of Spinstorme is a follow-up adventure to the previously published Amycus Probe.

== Reception ==
William A. Barton reviewed Rogue Moon of Spinstorme in The Space Gamer No. 48. Barton commented that "Overall, if you have Amycus Probe, you'll probably want to go with this one, too. As a stand-alone, Rogue Moon of Spinstorm is too much in the mold of past 'investigate alien installation' scenarios to be worth most refs' time and money."

Michael Stackpole reviewed Rogue Moon of Spinstorm in The Space Gamer No. 50. Stackpole commented that "Dave Sering does a fine job with the writing and general design. The mystery aspect of this adventure, however, is horrible. There are seven clues scattered around the two bases and battle raft presented for exploration. None of the clues are usable by the players. All clues have to be presented to the authorities for analysis."
