= James Mishler =

American journalist

James Mishler (born in April, 1969) is an American writer and editor, working mostly in the adventure game and comic book industries.

== Career ==
James Mishler was previously the associate editor for Comics & Games Retailer and Scrye, and later the managing editor for Comics & Games Retailer. Mishler formed a new company called Adventure Games Publishing with Bob Bledsaw. The company picked up the license to Judges Guild's Wilderlands setting after the license with Necromancer Games expired in late 2006. Mishler published Wilderlands books from 2007 to 2010, naming it the "Wilderlands of High Adventure", expanding the scope of the campaign setting and intending to refocus its swords & sorcery feel to an epic high fantasy campaign. Mishler shut down Adventure Games Publishing on March 8, 2010, after publishing 100 Street Vendors of the City State (2010), of which he said only two print copies and 13 PDF copies were sold.

During his career in the adventure game industry, James has worked for Andon Unlimited; Wizards of the Coast; Chessex Distribution; West End Games; Kenzer & Company; ACD Distribution; Krause Publications, as an associate editor on Scrye magazine; WizKids; and, since 2004, F&W Publications, as an associate editor on Comics Buyer's Guide, news editor on Scrye, and managing editor on Comics & Games Retailer, where he remains today.

James Mishler was managing editor of Comics & Games Retailer until it ceased publication in 2007.
