= The Astrogators Chartbook =

Science-fiction role-playing game supplement

Cover of The Astrogators Chartbook

The Astrogators Chartbook is a 1980 science-fiction role-playing game supplement for Traveller, published by Judges Guild.

== Contents ==
The Astrogators Chartbook provides three types of mapping grid sets and a solar system display. These materials are printed in black ink on heavy paper stock, intended for use by game referees to chart interstellar travel.

== Publication history ==
The supplement was released in 1980 by Judges Guild as a 96-page book.

== Reception ==
Richard A. Edwards reviewed The Astrogators Chartbook in The Space Gamer No. 38. He commented: "Considering the cost of photocopying all these maps out of a friend's copy, it is worth buying the book. The types of grids picked for inclusion are the most current in Traveller usage. It is a must for all Traveller referees."
