= Waspwinter =

Science-fiction role-playing game supplement

Waspwinter is a 1981 role-playing game supplement published by Judges Guild for Traveller.

== Contents ==
Waspwinter is supplement detailing a planet that alien space pirates are using as a colony for slave labor as part of an attempt to take over their own home world.

== Publication history ==
Waspwinter was written by Walter Bledsaw and Dorothy Bledsaw and was published in 1981 by Judges Guild as a 32-page book with a large map.

== Reception ==
Stefan Jones reviewed Waspwinter in The Space Gamer No. 49. Jones commented that "Waspwinter is an excellent adventure for refs who don't mind having to fill out the details of the adventures they buy. Those who want a ready-to-play situation are warned to try something else."

William A. Barton reviewed Waspwinter for Different Worlds magazine and stated that "Waspwinter fails in most of its concept. It isn't believable. It offers few moments of excitement. It has little to offer the Traveller player who has experienced the far superior adventures of GDW, FASA, and JG's own earlier ventures. Judges Guild is capable of much better."
