= Legendary Duck Tower =

Tabletop fantasy role-playing game supplement

And Other Tales
- Cover by Jennell Jaquays (Note: Credited as Paul Jaquays.)
- Designers: Jennell Jaquays; Rudy Kraft
- Publishers: Judges Guild
- Publication: 1980; 45 years ago
- Genres: Fantasy
- Systems: Basic Role-Playing

Legendary Duck Tower is a 1980 fantasy role-playing game adventure published by Judges Guild.

== Contents ==
Duck Tower is an adventure in a dungeon with a hundred rooms. Characters can encounter 61 different creatures.

The scenario is set in a citadel in ruins that was once populated by humanoid ducks. The book contains dozens of non-player characters. The gamemaster can decide where to place the encounters.

The book describes both an abandoned city and tower. The NPCs each have short paragraphs to describe their personalities and motives. The dungeon has detailed descriptions and several maps and diagrams, with a list of random items that players can find.

The ruined fortress-temple of the god Humakt is home to 17 groups of NPCs and monsters. The prosperous duck tribe that lived there when it fell centuries ago are a mutated or cursed race of humanoids. It has been taken over by explorers, outlaws, dangerous creatures, and archeologists. The gamemaster rolls a 100-sided die to assign a location for each encounter. One map without a grid pattern shows the entire Duck Tower complex, and the gamemaster shows the players a sketch of what is visible as the party comes near the temple.

== Publication history ==
Legendary Duck Tower and Other Tales was written by Jennell Jaquays and Rudy Kraft, and was published by Judges Guild in 1980 as a 64-page book.

Both the title and cover of the module reference the Dark Tower adventure also by Jaquays.

It is a supplement for RuneQuest for two or more players.

== Reception ==
Forrest Johnson, in The Space Gamer #29, commented that "Duck Tower is a wonder and a marvel, a priceless adventure for anyone who likes Runequest."

William Fawcett, in issue #44 of The Dragon, commented that "One of the weaknesses of many Runequest scenarios is that they sacrifice detail in the environment and dungeons, in favor of presenting the details of the statistics of a large number of non-player characters. [Duck Tower] is exceptional in that it not only avoids this problem, but does a very good job of presenting an interesting locale for adventuring in any system. This is definitely one of the best Runequest scenarios available and should be a must for anyone campaigning in the system."

Anders Swenson reviewed Duck Tower for Different Worlds magazine and stated that "The concept is one which should be applicable to many individually-written adventures, the found magical items are a new dimension to the game (there are no 'standard' RQ magic items in the tower as written) and overall it is a good investment for all RQ campaign referees."
