= Fantastic Personalities =

Front cover

Fantastic Personalities is a 1982 fantasy role-playing game supplement published by Judges Guild.

== Contents ==
Fantastic Personalities is a fantasy role-playing game supplement which details 85 non-player characters, including character level, social level, armor, alignment, character class, and scores for 14 different abilities.

== Reception ==
Lewis Pulsipher reviewed Fantastic Personalities in The Space Gamer No. 52. Pulsipher commented that "While the characters themselves are good (if you can't or won't devise NPCs yourself), the layout and editorial conception of the booklet is poor. You should get more than this for [the price]."
