= Dungeon Tac Cards =

1976 role-playing game supplement

- Genre: Role-playing game
- Publisher: Judges Guild
- Media type: Print

Dungeon Tac Cards is a supplement for fantasy role-playing games published by Judges Guild in 1976.

== Contents ==
Dungeon Tac Cards is a player's aid consisting of 140 weapon, equipment, and action cards, all of them containing the relevant rules and descriptions as used in Original D&D. The cards are meant to be placed in front of each player to display equipment in use by their player character.

== Publication history ==
Dungeon Tac Cards was published by Judges Guild in 1976 as 140 cardstock cards.

Soon after Gen Con IX, the first subscribers to Judges Guild's subscription format received their Initial Package (1976) in a plain large envelope consisting of loose leaf sheets and stapled booklets. The Initial Package included the Dungeon Tac Cards (1976) by Bill Owen, which were among the first Dungeons & Dragons references published by another company. According to author Shannon Appelcline, "these combat action cards are similar to those used much more recently by Dungeons & Dragons 4th Edition (2008) and Warhammer Fantasy Roleplay 3rd Edition (2009). They contain info for lots of weapons and even new combat tactics like 'jump' and 'punch.'" Judges Guild began selling Dungeon Tac Cards to stores in 1977.

== Reception ==
Don Turnbull reviewed TAC Cards for White Dwarf #3. Turnbull commented: "A very comprehensive set, therefore. However I am ambivalent about the merits of using these cards. I wonder whether their use would over-regularise play of D&D and make it mechanically more dull? [...] Providing the DM is flexible and permits some 'human error' (in the heat of battle it is understandable if a player forgets to turn his card) I think they could be valuable."
