= City of Lei Tabor =

Tabletop fantasy role-playing game adventure

- Cover by Kevin Siembieda
- Designers: Paul Nevins; Bill Faust
- Publishers: Judges Guild
- Publication: 1980; 45 years ago
- Genres: Fantasy
- Systems: Basic Role-Playing

City of Lei Tabor is a 1980 fantasy role-playing game supplement published by Judges Guild for RuneQuest.

== Contents ==
City of Lei Tabor is a supplement that describes a city state. It includes four maps. It describes many locations in the small city.

The book is an RQ2 Gateway campaign setting that details a feudal duchy, such as its stores and inns, and its cults and temples, as well as its rulers and inhabitants. It also presents short scenarios and details on new cults.

The book includes a list of non-player characters in the city, including residents, guards, and priest. The city is located in Glorantha. Several religious groups are included, most of which are new.

The book includes the plan for a small fortified town, detailing its military force. It includes maps of the territory around the town. The town is ruled by the Ducal House of Lei, what remains of an imperial line. The duchy extends beyond the city, with its militia to defend against bandits. The duke is a Rune Lord and head of the Lei Kung cult, and his adventurer daughter disappeared in the wilderness while his four sons are still in town. The ducal guards are called the Hammers of Kung. The thieves guild T'sei is another cult in the city.

== Publication history ==
City of Lei Tabor was written by Paul Nevins and Bill Faust, with illustrations by Kevin Siembieda, and was published by Judges Guild in 1980 as a 96-page book. It contains illustrations by Siembeida, Aaron Archero, and Bill Faust.

It is a supplement for RuneQuest for two or more players.

== Reception ==
Forrest Johnson reviewed City of Lei Tabor in The Space Gamer No. 32. Johnson commented that "Unless you are rich or hard up for a RuneQuest city, this supplement is not worth [the price]."

William Fawcett reviewed City of Lei Tabor in The Dragon #44. Fawcett commented that "There is really little to add in describing this module other than to observe that what it does — present interesting characters for the players to interact with — it does well."

Anders Swenson reviewed City of Lei Tabor for Different Worlds magazine and stated that "Lei Tabor could be transplanted into any world to be the 'town' from which most adventures start. With the publication of this book, many RQ referees will never have to write out an NPC soldier again, ever. This book should be in the library of all ambitious RQ players."
