= Ready Ref Sheets =

Tabletop role-playing game supplement

- Cover
- Genre: Role-playing game
- Publisher: Judges Guild
- Media type: Print

Ready Ref Sheets is a supplement for fantasy role-playing games published by Judges Guild in 1977.

== Contents ==
Ready Ref Sheets is a supplement containing reference tables for use by the gamemaster including items such as encounters, social levels for characters, obstacles to movement, rates for movement in wilderness terrain, times for magical research, and results of resurrection checks.

== Publication history ==
Ready Ref Sheets was published by Judges Guild in 1977 as a 56-page book. Judges Guild published a second edition in 1978.

In 1976, Judges Guild began releasing packages to their early subscribers in the format of loose leaf sheets in a large envelope, sometimes with a stapled booklet, starting with their Initial Package (1976) that came in a plain, unmarked envelope. Since the Initial Package was labeled with an "I," Judges Guild continued releasing subsequent subscription packages with first "J," then "K," then "L," and so on, on a bimonthly schedule. Installment J: Thunderhold (1976) and Installment K: City State Campaign (1977) were smaller than the Initial Package but otherwise similar. Judges Guild later included many of the charts from installments I, J, and K in a package called the Ready Ref Sheets (1977) as part of making their previous subscription material available to retail customers. A listing of cumulative sales from 1981 shows that Ready Ref Sheets sold over 20,000 units.

Different Worlds Publications later acquired and distributed Judges Guild game products, including the Ready Ref Sheets.

== Reception ==
Don Turnbull reviewed Ready Ref Sheets for White Dwarf #3. Turnbull commented: "Needless to say, it is very helpful to DM and players alike to have these useful data assembled in compact form and in sufficient copies to go round the same board conveniently."

Ken Rolston reviewed the Different Worlds Publications version of Ready Ref Sheets in The Dragon #133. Rolston commented that "Here are 56 pages of neat junk. My favorite is the Offensive Locution (verbal melee) rules, providing characters with a means for engaging in 'witticism' and 'repartee.' Another great piece is the Non-Player Character Cutups table, where you roll dice to see what horrendous social gaffe your hirelings have just committed ('This is to be used at judge's discretion, in large crowds, taverns, on the street, etc.'). This supplement contains lots of other wacky and even relatively useful stuff, like the elaborate Crime, Trial, and Punishment rules. Ready Ref Sheets deserves a six-star rating."

Lawrence Schick, in his book Heroic Worlds, commented that it contains "More tables than you can shake a stick at, basically.

== Reviews ==
- The Playboy Winner's Guide to Board Games
