= Navigator's Starcharts =

Science-fiction role-playing game supplement

Navigator's Starcharts is a 1981 role-playing game supplement for Traveller published by Judges Guild.

== Contents ==
Navigator's Starcharts is a play aid that comes with blank maps to record complete sectors and subsectors of space.

== Publication history ==
Navigator's Starcharts was written by Dave Sering and was published in 1981 by Judges Guild as a 112-page book.

== Reception ==
William A. Barton reviewed Navigator's Starcharts in The Space Gamer No. 43. Barton commented that "Navigator's Starcharts will save you considerable time and expense (unless you have a source of cheap photocopies) in your excursions into stellar cartography."
