= Marooned on Ghostring =

Science-fiction role-playing game supplement

Marooned on Ghostring is a 1981 role-playing game adventure published by Judges Guild for Traveller.

== Plot summary ==
Marooned on Ghostring is an adventure set in the fourth sector of the Gateway Quadrant, in which the player characters become stuck on Ghostring when their spacecraft is damaged after a misjump, and must repair their ship before they can leave.

== Publication history ==
Marooned on Ghostring was written by Walter Bledsaw and Dorothy Bledsaw and was published in 1981 by Judges Guild as a 32-page book.

== Reception ==
William A. Barton reviewed Marooned on Ghostring in The Space Gamer No. 48. Barton commented that "While better conceived than the average Group One planetary adventure, Marooned on Ghostring falls short of the past Guild efforts, though an enterprising ref might be able to make use of its basic situation with some careful modifications."

Michael Stackpole reviewed Marooned on Ghostring in The Space Gamer No. 50. Stackpole commented that "less than half of it is text, the rest is illustrations [...] If you look carefully, you notice that the same piece of dreadful artwork used on the back of the booklet is used as an interior illo."
