= The Maltese Clue =

Tabletop role-playing game adventure

- Authors: Paul Karczag
- First published: 1979

The Maltese Clue is an adventure for fantasy role-playing games published by Judges Guild in 1979.

== Contents ==
The Maltese Clue is a tournament adventure scenario designed for mid-level player characters who are associates or members of a thieves' guild; the adventure has a detective aspect, inspired by The Maltese Falcon, and the players must explore a castle that was based on Hedingham Castle.

== Publication history ==
The Maltese Clue was written by Paul Karczag, with art by Kevin Siembieda, and was published by Judges Guild in 1979 as a 48-page book.

== Reception ==
Patrick Amory reviewed The Maltese Clue for Different Worlds magazine and stated that "If you don't mind AD&D humor this one should be good for several somewhat ludicrous sessions of play."
