= Dra'k'ne Station =

Science-fiction role-playing game supplement

Dra'k'ne Station is a 1979 role-playing game adventure for Traveller published by Judges Guild.

== Plot summary ==
Dra'k'ne Station is an adventure which involves an alien research station built in the middle of an asteroid.

== Publication history ==
Dra'k'ne Station was written by Bill Paley, with art by Kevin Siembieda and was published in 1979 by Judges Guild as a 64-page book.

== Reception ==
Bob McWilliams reviewed Dra'k'ne Station for White Dwarf #18, giving it an overall rating of 8 out of 10, and stated that "a good effort in a new field, and I look forward to seeing further adventures from the JG stable."

William A. Barton reviewed Dra'k'ne Station in The Space Gamer No. 32. Barton commented that "I recommend Dra'k'ne Station as well worth the investment for any Traveller aficionado who wants a challenging adventure and who doesn't mind the possibility of losing a character or two in the process."
