= Temple Book I =

Role-playing game supplement

Temple Book I is a 1981 fantasy role-playing game supplement published by Judges Guild.

== Contents ==
Temple Book I is a supplement which supplies floor plans for temples in a fantasy setting for characters to encounter.

== Reception ==
Ronald Pehr reviewed Temple Book I in The Space Gamer No. 41. Pehr commented that "Although this is 'for any fantasy campaign,' there's a definite D&D bias in the charts. But you won't buy Temple Book I for charts. You'll buy it for 50 pages of maps, which are usable in any game; there'll be at least one to fit any given adventure you've conceived. Those who benefit from this type of game aid will get a lot of that benefit from Temple Book I."
