= Character Chronicle Cards =

1978 role-playing game supplement

- Genre: Role-playing game
- Publisher: Judges Guild
- Media type: Print

Character Chronicle Cards is a supplement for fantasy role-playing games published by Judges Guild in 1978.

== Contents ==
Character Chronicle Cards is a player's aid: small character record sheets printed on durable cardstock.

== Publication history ==
Character Chronicle Cards was published by Judges Guild in 1978 as 100 digest-sized cards.

== Reception ==
Don Turnbull reviewed Character Chronicle Cards for White Dwarf #3. Turnbull commented: "Very useful for DMs who wish to pre-generate characters and maintain a file as a source of hirelings, new player characters and non-player characters. Of less value for the player who continually has to update information since they are rather small. Perhaps rather expensive, too, for what they are."
