= Ravenscrag (Judges Guild) =

Tabletop role-playing game adventure

Ravenscrag is a 1981 role-playing game adventure published by Judges Guild.

== Plot summary ==
Ravenscrag is a book that describes a six-level castle and its five story keep and accompanying area, detailing both their rooms and inhabitants.

== Publication history ==
Ravenscrag was written by Scott Fulton, and published by Judges Guild in 1981 as a 64-page book with four large maps.

Shannon Appelcline noted that after Judges Guild lost the use of the name "Dungeons & Dragons" on their products, they began producing books to be used with any fantasy role-playing game system, and "joined the crowd producing "generic fantasy" adventures. Though some of their map books like Castle Book II (1980) and Temple Book I (1981) had opted not to use TSR's trade- marks, the Ravenscrag (1981) adventure marked the official beginning of Judges Guild's "universal fantasy" line. It was published before the end of the AD&D line, showing that the Guild was by now planning for its loss."

== Reception ==
Paul O'Connor reviewed Ravenscrag in The Space Gamer No. 45. O'Connor commented that "If you play D&D or think you can overcome the problems of non-specific text, then Ravenscraft is an excellent buy for the money."

David Nalle reviewed Ravenscrag for Different Worlds magazine and stated that "It is a pity that Ravenscrag does not live up to the promise of its first few pages. The regional description and background may be a bit unimaginative, but they are workmanlike and well done. Yet, after reading the castle material, especially the later sections, it seems as it the designer deals with the early parts of the scenario in an almost offhand manner in his eagerness to wallow in the mindlessly repetitive chaos of the latter sections. I fear that in Ravenscrag Judges Guild has thrown away some good work in their longtime reliance on stale formulae. If they cannot break out of this pattern the FRPing market will soon leave them behind."
