= The Book of Ruins =

Role-playing game supplement

- Cover
- Genre: Role-playing game
- Publisher: Judges Guild
- Media type: Print

The Book of Ruins is a supplement for fantasy role-playing games published by Judges Guild in 1981.

== Contents ==
The Book of Ruins consists of ten miniscenarios, dungeons set in ruins of all sorts. Inhabitants include ogres, carnivorous apes, huge spiders, orcs, and efreets.

The Book of Ruins is a supplement composed of ten short dungeon adventures designed for four to eight AD&D player characters. Each scenario is set in a structure of between 3-20 rooms, with three of the adventures meant for 1st-3rd level characters, one for 8th-10th level characters, four adventures in between those ranges and one for characters of higher level. The supplement also provides a method for integrating these adventures into an existing role-playing game campaign.

== Publication history ==
The Book of Ruins was written by Michael Mayeau, and was published by Judges Guild in 1981 as a 32-page book.

== Reception ==
Ronald Pehr reviewed the adventure in The Space Gamer No. 41. He commented that "This book was a pleasant surprise. At first glance, the scenarios appeared too short, simple-minded, nothing but slay-monsters-rake-in-fabulous-loot; characteristic of AD&D adventures. But they were fun to play! The higher level scenarios fully challenge the powers of the players: Scout ahead, guard your flanks, support each other, or you don't get out alive!" He continued: "However, each scenario is only slay-monsters-rake-in-etc. The low level scenarios are too short, the AD&D hit point system brings low-level characters instant death or instant victory, and treasure is far too generous for what the characters accomplish." Pehr concluded the review by saying "AD&D is billed as a role-playing game. The Book of Ruins has little of that. But if you take it for what it's worth – fast action adventures, for random adventures or part of a campaign – and if you enjoy gaming which is heavy on the bloody combat, you won't be disappointed."
