= Starships & Spacecraft =

Science-fiction role-playing game supplement

Starships & Spacecraft is a supplement published by Judges Guild in 1979 for Game Designers Workshop's science-fiction role-playing game Traveller.

== Contents ==
Starships & Spacecraft is a supplement containing three large three-color sheets of startship deck plans, which also provide technical data, and sheets containing information on each of the types of craft found in Traveller Book 2 (Starships).

== Publication history ==
Starships & Spacecraft was written by Dave Sering and was published in 1979 by Judges Guild as three 3-color map sheets.

== Reception ==
Bob McWilliams reviewed Starships and Spacecraft for White Dwarf #15, giving it an overall rating of 5 out of 10, and stated that "If you feel you really cannot design and draw your own starship layouts (surely one of the pleasures of being a Traveller Referee), this is for you."

William A. Barton reviewed Starships & Spacecraft in The Space Gamer No. 32. Barton commented that "Starships & Spacecraft should prove quite helpful in making your Traveller campaign even more realistic to your players. It deserves a place in your Traveller library."
