= The Tower of Indomitable Circumstance =

Tabletop role-playing game adventure

The Tower of Indomitable Circumstance is a 1981 fantasy role-playing game adventure published by Judges Guild.

== Contents ==
The Tower of Indomitable Circumstance is an adventure for beginning player characters of all character classes. It is the first published game scenario by Quest for Glory co-designer Corey Cole, Cover and some interior illustration by E. L. Perry (now known as Tristan Alexander.

== Reception ==
Anders Swenson reviewed The Tower of Indomitable Circumstance for Different Worlds magazine and stated that "The Tower of Indomitable Circumstance is an interesting work from many standpoints. It is an adventure that imaginative GMs are advised to change if the reestablishment of the Order of Math or at least the magician-cleric class is not desired. The 'universal' adventure gaming notation is at least a workmanlike attempt, although gamers who use any system other than D&D or Adruin will have their work cut out for them. This adventure is definitely among the better Judges Guild products, for having a plot, and a valid reason for the various traps and monsters being where they are."

Ian L. Straus reviewed The Tower of Indomitable Circumstance in The Space Gamer No. 50. Straus commented that "GMs who need a change of pace and have experienced players should buy this adventure if they are willing to correct its flaws. It does play smoothly after you fix the maps."
