= Tegel Manor =

Tabletop role-playing game adventure

- Publishers: Judges Guild
- Publication: 1977
- Genres: Role-playing

Tegel Manor is a 1977 fantasy role-playing game adventure published by Judges Guild.

== Contents ==
Tegel Manor is an adventure involving Sir Runic the Rump, the only living member of the Rump family, who has unsuccessfully tried to sell the massive manor-fortress Tegel Manor, and is prepared to reward anyone who is able to remove all 100 of his corrupted dead ancestors — whose names all start with "R" — from the family manor.

The game includes a 24-page booklet, some blank player maps, and a complete map for the gamemaster. RPG historian Stu Horvath characterized the map as "one of the most labyrinthine dungeon maps ever put into print."

== Publication history ==
Tegel Manor (1977) included one of the first published dungeons in a role-playing game, and was first made available to Judges Guild subscribers as Installment L: Tegel Manor, but was made available later that year for retail sale as Tegel Manor Fantasy Game Play Aid. A cumulative sales listing shows that Tegel Manor sold over 25,000 units by 1981. While the City State of the Invincible Overlord line was licensed to Mayfair Games, Mayfair gave permission to Lou Zocchi to publish The Original Tegel Manor, Revised & Expanded (1989) through his company Gamescience. Necromancer Games obtained the rights to produce an updated d20 version of Tegel Manor, but Judges Guild withdrew the rights before Necromancer Games was able to publish it.

== Reception ==
Don Turnbull reviewed Tegel Manor for White Dwarf #3, and stated that "I have been fortunate enough to play this scenario and found it enjoyable – not wildly suspense-full or nail-bitingly exciting, but a novel change from the more familiar dungeon-setting."

Patrick Amory reviewed Tegel Manor for Different Worlds magazine and stated that "A gigantic haunted manor house, rather randomly filled with monsters and treasure. The map is nice but almost any competent GM can produce a better adventure than this. A classic example of early Judges Guild work".

Mike Kardos reviewed Tegel Manor in The Space Gamer No. 53. Kardos commented that "With a little effort, Tegel Manor makes an enjoyable addition to any D&D campaign."

In his 2023 book Monsters, Aliens, and Holes in the Ground, RPG historian Stu Horvath noted, "Tegel Manor is what has come to be known as a funhouse dungeon; that categorization comes with the assumption that making sense is not a primary goal ... The result is a creation of unpredictable environment for players, who are kept guessing at every closed door, and laughing around the play table, even as their characters suffer increasingly improbable demises." In this respect, Horvath called Tegel Manor a pioneer of the mega-dungeon both in print and in videogames such as Zork, Metroid and Bloodborne, saying, "Tegel Manor isn't quite so arduous or lengthy, but it helped paved the way for all of those other terrifying holes in the ground."

Author and critic Lev Grossman commented on the 240-room-4-level castle: "For fans it is a true dungeon-funhouse."

== Other reviews ==
- The Playboy Winner's Guide to Board Games
