= Caves and Caverns =

Role-playing game supplement

Caves and Caverns is a 1982 fantasy role-playing game adventure published by Judges Guild.

== Contents ==
Caves and Caverns is an adventure supplement designed to be used with any role-playing game system, and contains tables for random generation of treasure and dungeons as well as a book of hex maps to assist the gamemaster with planning campaigns and adventures.

== Publication history ==
Caves and Caverns was written by John Mortimer, and published by Judges Guild in 1982 as a 64-page book.

== Reception ==
Kelly Grimes reviewed Caves and Caverns in The Space Gamer No. 60. Grimes commented that "it would be wise to pass this one by. This is simply too much to pay for a very incomplete product unless you are simply desperate for hex maps."
