= Laser Tank (board game) =

1980 board game published by Judges Guild

Laser Tank is a 1980 board game published by Judges Guild.

== Gameplay ==
Laser Tank is a set of miniatures combat rules with cardstock vehicles.

== Reception ==
William A. Barton reviewed Laser Tank in The Space Gamer No. 35. Barton commented that "All in all, Laser Tank isn't a bad buy for use in a role-playing campaign. And, for a quicky, little-thought AFV battle, the Laser Tank rules (and vehicles) might prove sufficient for some. Real miniature armor enthusiasts, though, would be advised to look elsewhere for SF armor rules. If you do buy Laser Tank for the miniature rules, well, don't say you weren't warned."
