= Escape from Astigar's Lair =

- Authors: Allen V. Pruehs and Ree Moorhead Pruehs
- First published: 1980

Escape from Astigar's Lair is an adventure for fantasy role-playing games published by Judges Guild in 1980.

== Plot summary ==
Escape from Astigar's Lair is a scenario in which two pre-generated characters are provided, and the characters must escape the stronghold of an evil wizard within one hour; players in a tournament were to be judged on how well they role-played their characters.

Escape from Astigar's Lair is an adventure intended to be used in a tournament, but can also be played outside of a tournament setting. The two player characters provided are a druid and a ranger, and are fully detailed in the back of the book. The characters have followed the bard Egad into his lair, and have sixty minutes to escape from his halls or he will destroy them. The Dungeon Master is instructed to award or subtract points to the players based on successfully performed feats or mistakes made.

This adventure is a dungeon that was intended to be run real-time allowing only one hour for the players to have the characters complete the quest, with a simplified system for initiative.

== Publication history ==
Escape from Astigar's Lair was used as the official Advanced Dungeons & Dragons tournament dungeon at Michicon VIII.

Escape from Astigar's Lair was written by Allen V. Pruehs and Ree Moorhead Pruehs, and was published by Judges Guild in 1980 as a 16-page book.

== Reception ==
Elisabeth Barrington reviewed the adventure in The Space Gamer No. 30. She opined, "I wish all the modules JG published were as well-written and as fun to play as is Escape From Astigar's Lair. Play moved quickly enough that the characters do not have time to sit and wonder how to resolve something, they must get in there and do it. In this respect, play simulates real happenings in such a situation. How much time would you want to take to figure out how to get rid of a water weird if you had used up half of your sixty minutes to get to that messy situation in the first place? It is suggested that the DM use a timing system, for it is with this that the module was designed to work." She continued, "Aside from the arbitrary lessenings of the powers of some spells to almost useless, and allowing only a few options in given situations, there is not much wrong with the supplement. There are typos, as in almost any book of this kind, but they can be borne in the face of such good work." Barrington concluded her review by describing the adventure as "Well worth the small price. The design can be built upon for future uses, or changed in small ways for the individual needs of the players. If you like the AD&D system, this is a good way in which to use it."

Escape from Astigar's Lair was reviewed in Dragon #44 (December 1980) by William Fawcett. He stated "It is one of the least expensive items offered by the Guild, and in some ways one of the best. Since it was originally set up as a tournament, rather extensive modification will be required to adapt this set to fit your campaign." Commenting on the simplified initiative system to help meet the time limit, Fawcett said "You may have difficulty using a more cumbersome system and still completing the quest in the time allowed." He commented that "One factor that slowed down play when this dungeon was tested was that the points gained or lost for any action are listed separately at the end of the booklet. This leads to a lot of page-turning by the judge. The alternative is to tear apart the booklet and spread everything out. You will find that this is necessary anyhow, to give the player or players the detailed descriptions of the two main characters. These are long descriptions, and their contents are vital to playing the scenario correctly." Fawcett concluded his review by saying "The writing itself (about 10 pages) is clear and descriptive. The dungeon offers a few interesting traps and puzzles. It is definitely designed as a thinking player’s dungeon. The two main characters are a Druid and a Ranger. If you enjoy playing either, this dungeon is designed specifically for their powers and abilities. Play is best limited to a DM and two players."

== Reviews ==
- Different Worlds #8 Jun 1980)
