= Glory Hole Dwarven Mine =

1981 role-playing game

Glory Hole Dwarven Mine is a 1981 role-playing game adventure published by Judges Guild.

== Plot summary ==
Glory Hole Dwarven Mine is an adventure in which the player characters are among several parties which explore a large dwarven mine which has just started being subjected to demonic intrusions.

== Publication history ==
Glory Hole Dwarven Mine was written by Edward R.G. Mortimer, and was published by Judges Guild in 1981 as a 48-page book.

== Reception ==
Lewis Pulsipher reviewed Glory Hole Dwarven Mine in The Space Gamer No. 54. Pulsipher commented that "This was a decent idea, for the most part, but inadequately produced."
