= Darthanon Queen =

Science-fiction role-playing game supplement

Darthanon Queen is a 1980 fantasy role-playing game adventure published by Judges Guild for Traveller.

== Plot summary ==
Darthanon Queen is set of three adventure scenarios set on board the disabled merchant ship called The Darthanon Queen, in which the player characters must salvage the ship and save its passengers.

== Publication history ==
Darthanon Queen was written by Ray Harms, Michael Reagan, and Dan Hauffe and was published in 1980 by Judges Guild as a 32-page book with removable deck plans and a map.

== Reception ==
William A. Barton reviewed Darthanon Queen in The Space Gamer No. 34. Barton commented that "All in all, the high standards of Judges Guild shine through in this adventure. It can only be hoped that JG will continue to contribute to the growing family of Traveller products."
