= Portals of Torsh =

Tabletop role-playing game supplement

- Genre: Role-playing game
- Publisher: Judges Guild
- Media type: Print

Portals of Torsh is a supplement for fantasy role-playing games published by Judges Guild in 1980.

== Plot summary ==
Portals of Torsh is a campaign setting supplement intended for mid-level player characters, set in the prehistoric fantasy world of Torsh that uses magic portals for travel. The supplement provides a short summary of the world (along with wilderness encounters), along with details on a human town and a lizardman town, as well as a short scenario that takes place in the tower of a lizard-wizard.

Portals of Torsh is a supplement that describes the small continent of Torsh which is mainly populated with lizard-men and prehistoric reptiles, with another plateau community populated by humans. The adventure includes encounters for dungeon, ruins, and wilderness environments. Teleportation portals, which were constructed by a lost race, have been scattered across the continent; one or more may be connected to the campaign world of the Dungeon Master to allow characters to travel to and from there.

Portals of Torsh is a module approved for use with AD&D that presents a world in which is an ancient race built a series of portals to connect their world to other worlds before that race died out. The supplement lists the various types and specifics of the portals along with tables so more portals can be generated for use in a campaign. The adventure involves a human colony that lives on a plateau of another world. Only lizards evolved on the world of Torsh, so Lizardmen are the dominant species, and native plants are a poisonous to humans. One plateau was settled by a group of humans that fled through another portal has been made habitable for their descendants.

== Publication history ==
Portals of Torsh was written by Rudy Kraft, with a cover by Jennell Jaquays (Note: Credited as Paul Jaquays.), and was published by Judges Guild in 1980 as a 48-page book.

Portals of Torsh is the first supplement released for the Portals series, depicting adventure sites which have been connected to each other through a series of interplanetary or interdimensional portals for teleportation.

== Reception ==
Aaron Allston reviewed the adventure in The Space Gamer No. 31. He commented that "Anyone really interested in a pre-fab lizard-man continent may want to look at this one." He stated that "This adventure has one advantage in that it is specifically designed to be accessible by any number of campaigns" because of the portals, but added that "logical access is not that big of a plus. The adventure is simply not very interesting. Characters can wander around wasting monsters, gathering loot, and gaining experience, all without having much fun." Allston concluded his review by stating "Overall, this supplement will probably appeal only to those DMs who aren't imaginative enough to create something better."

Portals of Torsh was reviewed in Dragon #44 (December 1980) by William Fawcett. He noted that the portals in the adventure were "interesting and bear an obvious resemblance to those of D.J. Cherryh and other science-fiction novels using a similar approach". He commented that "Most of the module is based upon the interaction of the humans with the more numerous and physically stronger lizardmen. The slowly poisonous environment is a unique touch that will make your players pay more attention to some fundamentals of survival that are often overshadowed by the magic and combat." Fawcett added: "An even more detailed than normal background is given on the planet, its economy, societies, etc. and comprises a significant part of the module. An adventure in this module will be a 'wilderness' adventure (as opposed to a 'dungeon' adventure) in that there are no detailed goals. This allows for more variety, but gives the DM a lot more to prepare." He commented on the presentation: "Several maps are given, some covering an entire continent. Most are given without scale and the most detailed will show only sections of a city. Greater detail is then left for the judge to contribute. There are many ideas that are worth utilizing in the module. A detailed handling of dinosaurs (earth-type) is included, plus several tables that would be useful for generating encounters on any lost plateaus on your own earth. The art is again visually pleasing, but most often is not directly related to the material being discussed on the same page." Fawcett concluded his review by saying, "This is a module that could be the basis of an entire campaign. There is certainly enough here to make the next curse (or teleport trap) to another planet more than a passing frustration. There is even the means of eventual return, via another portal."
