= Survival of the Fittest (Judges Guild) =

- Authors: Michael Mayeau
- First published: 1979

Survival of the Fittest is an adventure for fantasy role-playing games published by Judges Guild in 1979.

== Plot summary ==
Survival of the Fittest is an adventure scenario intended for a group of player characters of levels 1-2 that does not need a gamemaster, in which the characters are tested for their skills, with failure resulting in death.

Survival of the Fittest is a dungeon adventure for one player intended to be used with 1-4 1st or 2nd level characters of any character class or race. For the purposes of the adventure Thieves, Assassins, Monks, Rangers, and Paladins would count as fighters with one special ability depending on their class, while Clerics, Druids, Illusionists, and Magic Users are only able to attack using spells, and using magic items is restricted.

== Publication history ==
Survival of the Fittest was written by Michael Mayeau, and was published by Judges Guild in 1979 as a 32-page book.

== Reception ==
Patrick V. Reyes reviewed Survival of the Fittest in The Space Gamer No. 39. He comments that "It's called Survival of the Fittest because it's a good way to get rid of really weak 1st or 2nd level characters." Reyes notes that "Survival of the Fittest uses a page and number solitaire system, similar to Metagaming's Microquest series." He continues: "The scenario is a good way to for low to average beginning characters to get e.p.'s, treasure, magic items, or even a chance to improve their characteristics. Although good for weak characters, Survival of the Fittest is a breeze for stronger-than-average characters. The dungeon is very simple, making mapping unnecessary. Lastly, the pages include a lot of unneeded paragraphs - you never run into them unless you happen to go to the wrong number. Instant death for your character is a little too high a price to pay just because you happened to misread the directions." Reyes concluded his review by saying, "If you want an easy way to advance characters to 3rd or 2nd level, along with grabbing treasure and magic items along the way, get Survival of the Fittest. But if you want a real challenge stick to your local DM."

Patrick Amory reviewed Survival of the Fittest for Different Worlds magazine and stated that "The same stupid, sophomoric humor of the T&T solo dungeons has unfortunately infected this one. Don't even look through it."

== Reviews ==
- Different Worlds #6 (Dec 1979)
