= Of Skulls and Scrapfaggot Green =

- Authors: Bob Blake
- First published: 1979

Of Skulls and Scrapfaggot Green is an adventure for fantasy role-playing games published by Judges Guild in 1979.

== Contents ==
Of Skulls and Scrapfaggot Green is the official GenCon X D&D tournament dungeon. The player characters must find a magical relic and carry it through the Forbidden Lands to where it is to be used to close an interplanar portal. It includes a description of the village of Scrapfaggot Green.

== Publication history ==
Of Skulls and Scrapfaggot Green was written by Bob Blake, and was published by Judges Guild in 1978 as a 52-page book. Judges Guild published a second edition in 1980.

== Reception ==
Don Turnbull reviewed Of Skulls and Scrapfaggot Green for White Dwarf #14, and rated it a 7 out of 10. Turnbull commented: "The adventure itself is well planned and carefully designed, though there are a number of parts of Skull which are of no direct relevance to the adventure, and players could waste a lot of time in them".

Patrick Amory reviewed Of Skulls and Scrapfaggot Green for Different Worlds magazine and stated that "Another relatively early release, Skulls is a perfect example of why tournament dungeons should not be published. Probably a good test in a D&D tourney, Skulls will not fit into any campaign without overcoming that "testing" flavor."
