= Simba Safari =

Science-fiction role-playing game supplement

Simba Safari is a 1981 fantasy role-playing game adventure published by Judges Guild for Traveller.

== Plot summary ==
Simba Safari is an adventure involving a dangerous interstellar safari in the Diamond-Prince subsector of the Ley Sector.

== Publication history ==
Simba Safari was written by Dave Sering and was published in 1981 by Judges Guild as a 32-page book.

== Reception ==
Doug Houseman reviewed Simba Safari for Different Worlds magazine and stated that "This module is the best that Judges Guild has offered for Traveller in a while. With several world maps and a half dozen encounter tables the GM has enough material to fill an all-day adventure."

William A. Barton reviewed Simba Safari in The Space Gamer No. 49. Barton commented that "in the hands of the right group of players, this could easily prove the best Traveller adventure JG has published in some time."

== Review ==
- Dragon #63 (July, 1982)
