= House on Hangman's Hill =

- Authors: Jon Mattson
- First published: 1981

House on Hangman's Hill is an adventure for fantasy role-playing games published by Judges Guild in 1981.

== Plot summary ==
House on Hangman's Hill is an adventure scenario intended for player characters of levels 3-4 which takes place in a classic haunted house.

The huge mansion of 38 rooms stands near the village of Hedgehill, with six doors the characters can enter, and they will deal with illusions and other encounters until they destroy the haunting spirit of its unjustly-executed former owner.

== Publication history ==
House on Hangman's Hill was written by Jon Mattson, and was published by Judges Guild in 1981 as a 32-page book.

== Reception ==
Anders Swenson reviewed House on Hangman's Hill and Trial by Fire for Different Worlds magazine and stated that "The House on Hangman's Hill and Trial by Fire are products which fulfill their basic purpose of being useable adventures for low-level games. However, they suffer from poor development, and the new GM would do well to shun these products in favor of similar, albeit more expensive, adventures from other adventure-gaming houses."

Ian L. Straus reviewed the adventure in The Space Gamer No. 52. He commented that, "True to the horror-movie theme, some eerie events who no consequences are included just to make the players jump. There are also NPCs, rats, werewolves, and plenty of undead. Some of the worst fights can be avoided, so players who automatically charge will be punished. The room paragraphs are well-organized, and the map is amply detailed." He continued: "However, a haunted-house atmosphere may not suit all players. If you break the mood, the map becomes another generic dungeon with a few more exits. D&D players always partook more of horror movies than Conan, and the players may see no difference. The DM should add marginal reminders (to himself) to mention cobwebs and creaking doors. The floor plan is a 400' x 280' ranch house; it would match both the cover art and horror movies better if it had three stories. I suggest you rescale the map from 10' to 5' squares before you run it. I also suggest you encourage the party to walk around the outside. It is a house, not a burrow; give the players a grid sheet with door and outside walls marked." Straus concluded the review by saying, "This adventure will be enjoyable if some of the players are horror movie fans. Average characters should be third- or fourth-level because more powerful parties will not have the fun of being scared."
