= Amycus Probe =

Science-fiction role-playing game supplement

Amycus Probe is a 1981 role-playing game adventure for Traveller published by Judges Guild.

== Plot summary ==
Amycus Probe is an adventure involving the ruins of a mysterious alien installation found on the planet Amycus, located in the Osiris Deep subsector of the Gateway Quadrant.

== Publication history ==
Amycus Probe was written by Dave Sering and was published in 1981 by Judges Guild as a 32-page book.

== Reception ==
William A. Barton reviewed Amycus Probe in The Space Gamer No. 47. Barton commented that "I recommend that if Amycus Probe is used, it be used in the campaign version and not as a one-time scenario. Provided that the latter adventures in the series carry through on the theme, it could form the basis of an interesting campaign situation."
