= Tancred (Judges Guild) =

Science-fiction role-playing game supplement

Tancred is a 1980 fantasy role-playing game adventure published by Judges Guild for Traveller.

== Plot summary ==
Tancred is an adventure that takes place on the planet Tancred in the Imperium's Outreamer subsector, which is under a rebellion against the nobility that owns and exploits the planet.

== Publication history ==
Tancred was written by Dave Sering and was published in 1980 by Judges Guild as a 48-page book.

== Reception ==
William A. Barton reviewed Tancred in The Space Gamer No. 35. Barton commented that "most role-players probably won't be all that concerned with proofreading errors [...] and so should find Tancred near the top of all the Traveller adventures currently available."
