= Dark Tower (module) =

Dungeons & Dragons adventure module

- Authors: Jennell Jaquays (Note: Credited as Paul Jaquays.)
- First published: 1980

Dark Tower is an adventure module published by Judges Guild in 1980 for the Advanced Dungeons & Dragons fantasy role-playing game.

== Plot summary ==
Dark Tower is an adventure in which followers of Set and Mitra and the surrounding lands challenge each other for control of a dungeon. The module details a village and four dungeon levels.

== Publication history ==
Dark Tower was written by Jennell Jaquays and published by Judges Guild in 1979 as a 72-page book.

A listing of cumulative sales from 1981 shows that Dark Tower sold over 15,000 units.

Shannon Appelcline explained that in early 1999, with Bob Bledsaw leading, Judges Guild returned on the web to sell original Judges Guild products, and "Afterward Judges Guild took the same path as many other first-generation RPG publishers in the d20 age: they became a licensor", and "Their first partner was RPGRealms / QuickLinkInteractive. QLI reprinted just two books during the two years that they held the license — Dark Tower (2001) and The Treasury of Archaic Names (2001)".

In 2007, the Dark Tower Silver Edition for Dungeons and Dragons v3.5 was released by Judges Guild, Goodman Games, and Eostros Games. Credited authors for this version were Jennell Jaquays, Greg Geilman, and Steve Stottrup. While keeping most of the original Jaquays' text, this version fixed typos, updated the formatting and maps, and contained new material to incorporate into the Judges Guild Wilderlands of High Fantasy setting.

In 2016, the Dark Tower (Tabletop Edition) was released by Goodman Games. The "tabletop edition" version was a restored scan of the original 1980 version of the module.

In 2021, Goodman Games obtained the rights from Judges Guild to publish a version of Dark Tower for 5E, and Dungeon Crawl Classics RPG.

== Reception ==
Don Turnbull reviewed Dark Tower for White Dwarf #17, giving it an overall rating of 9 out of 10, and stated that "whereas in the past Judges Guild products have not compared particularly favourably, in the depth of their presentation and the coherence of their contents, with the TSR products, Dark Tower is the one which comes the closest . There are signs of random selection in the occupants of some of the dungeon areas but this is only to be expected. In all, Dark Tower should provide an absorbing and most interesting adventure."

Patrick Amory reviewed Dark Tower for Different Worlds magazine and stated that "Dark Tower is well worked out with intrigues, complicated interrelationships, and a background that reads like a fantasy novel."

Lawrence Schick, in his 1991 book Heroic Worlds, notes that this "[p]opular scenario" was "Judges Guild's best-selling scenario."

Dark Tower was ranked the 21st greatest Dungeons & Dragons adventure of all time by Dungeon magazine in 2004, on the 30th anniversary of the Dungeons & Dragons game. This is most noteworthy because Dark Tower was the only adventure module to make this list that was not produced by TSR, Inc., the direct antecedent of Wizards of the Coast.

According to author Shannon Appelcline, "Jaquay's AD&D adventure, Dark Tower (1980), is considered an early masterpiece."

In his 2023 book Monsters, Aliens, and Holes in the Ground, RPG historian Stu Horvath called this, "a massive, 72-page masterpiece of the early [RPG] era and [Jaquay's] first design for Judges Guild as a full-time employee." Horvath went on to describe it as "a romp. Clever, compelling, and silly, it never lets players take it too seriously, but it also never ceases to be dangerous."

== Reviews ==
- Pyramid (for d20)
