= Lara's Tower =

Tabletop role-playing game supplement

- Authors: Kevin Nunn
- First published: 1981

Lara's Tower is an adventure for fantasy role-playing games published by Judges Guild in 1981.

== Contents ==
Lara's Tower is an adventure scenario which takes place in a tower with 10 levels.

== Publication history ==
Lara's Tower was written by Kevin Nunn, and was published by Judges Guild in 1981 as a 16-page book.
