= The Playboy Winner's Guide to Board Games =

1979 book by Jon Freeman

- Cover
- Authors: Jon Freeman
- Language: English
- Subject: Board games
- Publication date: 1979
- Publication place: United States
- Media type: Print
- ISBN: 0-872-16562-0

The Playboy Winner's Guide to Board Games is a 1979 book by Jon Freeman. It is a revised edition of A Player's Guide to Table Games by the same author, but under the name John Jackson.

== Contents ==
The Playboy Winner's Guide to Board Games is a book of tips on strategies for how to win board games. The book consists of 11 chapters, with the first seven chapters discussing a variety of different kinds of board games, while the final chapter goes into detail on role-playing games. This book is one of a few that covered a large number of proprietary board games, rather than just traditional board games.

== Reception ==
Steve Jackson reviewed The Playboy Winner's Guide to Board Games in The Space Gamer No. 44. Jackson commented that "This is a definite 'go' if you don't confine yourself to wargames. The more restricted the spectrum of games you play, the less likely it is you'll find it worthwhile. Conversely, if you play everything you can find, you'll like the book."
