= Bob Bledsaw =

American game designer (1942–2008)

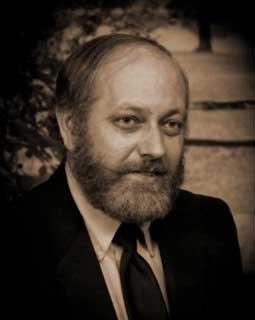
- Born: May 18, 1942; Decatur, Illinois
- Died: April 19, 2008 (aged 65)
- Resting place: Graceland Cemetery (Decatur, Illinois)

Robert Eugene Bledsaw (May 18, 1942 – April 19, 2008) was the founder of the role-playing game publisher Judges Guild.

== Early life and education ==
Bob Bledsaw was born May 18, 1942, in Decatur, Illinois, and his parents were Walter and Dorothy Bledsaw. He attended Lakeview High School and Richland Community College and went to Millikin University. He worked as an engineer for A.W. Cash, Grigoleit, Essex Wire, General Electric and Zexel Illinois, where he helped in the development of quadraphonic sound systems.

== Career ==
In 1975, Bob Bledsaw began to run a Dungeons & Dragons campaign using the original rules, after being asked for help by Bill Owen and some other friends after trying and failing to run the game themselves four times; Bledsaw started his adventure in a fantasy campaign set in Middle-earth, but moved the campaign to a realm he designed - the City State of the Invincible Overlord - because he did not want to sacrifice the low-magic feel of Tolkien when compared to the game. Bledsaw was laid off by General Electric in 1975, so he decided to form a company to publish supplements for D&D players, and with Bill Owen he went to seek permission from TSR. Bledsaw and Owen showed their City-State material to Dave Arneson, Gary Gygax, and other TSR staff, who told them they could publish supplements to D&D if they wanted to. With this casual licensing agreement, they created a large map of the City-State, first selling copies of the map as well as subscriptions to the Judges Guild bimonthly publication of play aids. With business partner Bill Owen he founded The Judges Guild Game Co. in 1976 in Decatur, which published role-playing games and supplies.

Bledsaw and Owen became full-time employees of Judges Guild in 1977; Owen was also working full-time for his family business, so he left Judges Guild in fall 1977 and sold his shares in the company to Bledsaw. Bledsaw was able to move Judges Guild from his living room to an actual office by spring 1978. Bledsaw wanted to use his connection with miniatures publisher Chuck Anshell - who was a friend of a son of J.R.R. Tolkien - to obtain a license to Middle-earth, but waited out of respect for the 1973 death of Tolkien, allowing Iron Crown Enterprises the opportunity to acquire the license instead. Bledsaw sent hundreds of pages of campaign notes to Gary Gygax in 1978, who used some of this material in the appendices of the original Dungeon Masters Guide. TSR started publishing their own adventures in 1978 beginning with the G-series, the D-series, and Tomb of Horrors, and Bledsaw felt this violated the agreement between TSR and Judges Guild. Judges Guild had stopped publishing new material by 1985, after a number of distributors and retailers closed down while owing money to Judges Guild.

Bledsaw remained in charge of Judges Guild, and he returned the company in early 1999 on the internet at judgesguild.com, which sold original Judges Guild products which had been stored in a warehouse for 15 years, and began to take magazine subscriptions for Pegasus. Bledsaw and James Mishler founded the company Adventure Games Publishing.

Bob Bledsaw died on April 19, 2008, from cancer. Bob Bledsaw II took over Judges Guild, which published Lost Man's Trail (2010) the final contribution of Bob Bledsaw to the Wilderlands setting.
