= Jennell Jaquays =

American artist and game designer (1956–2024)

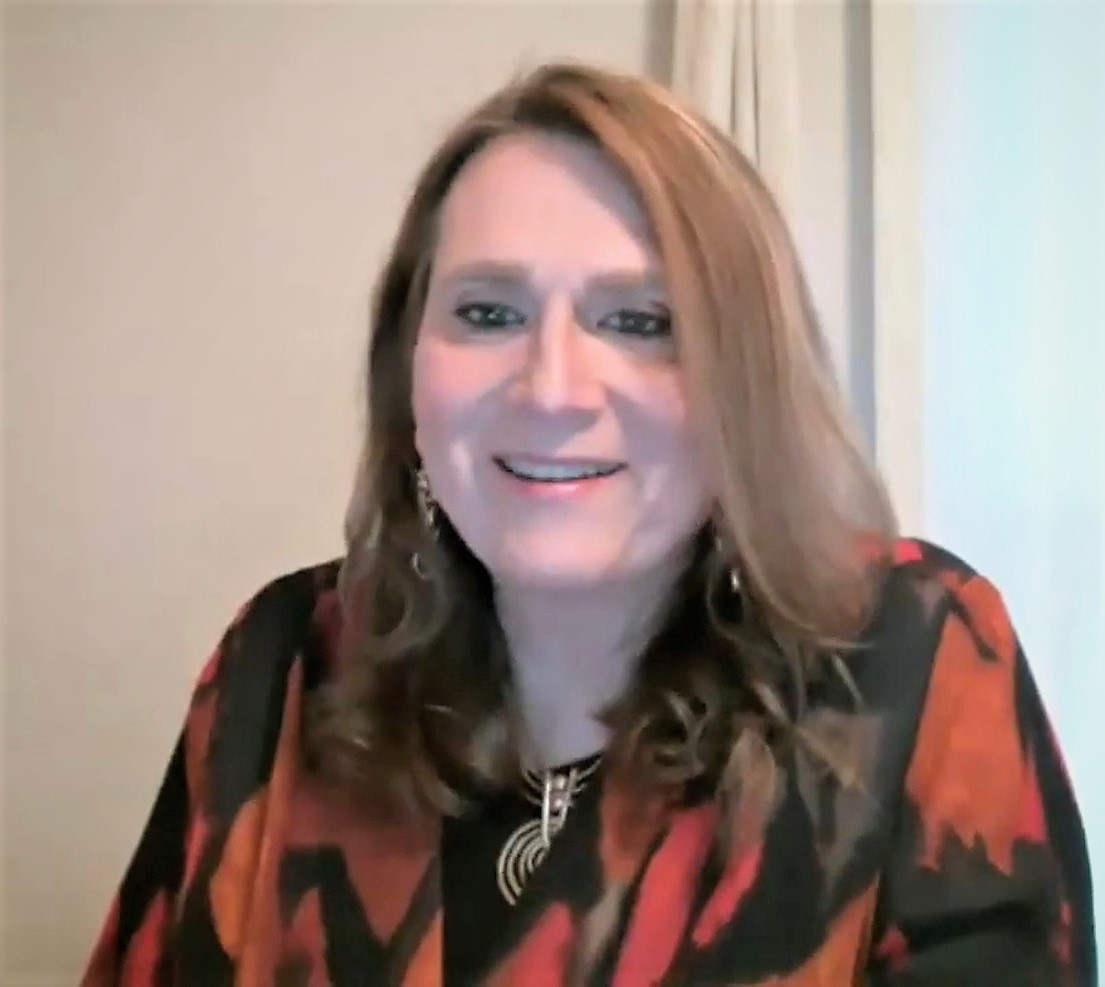
- Jaquays in 2012
- Born: Paul Jaquays; October 14, 1956; Michigan, U.S.
- Died: January 10, 2024 (aged 67); Dallas, Texas, U.S.
- Occupations: Game designer and artist
- Spouse: Rebecca Heineman
- Writing career
- Genres: Role-playing games, video games

Jennell Allyn Jaquays (born Paul Jaquays; October 14, 1956 – January 10, 2024) was an American game designer, video game artist, and illustrator of tabletop role-playing games (RPGs). Her works include the Dungeons & Dragons modules Dark Tower and Caverns of Thracia for Judges Guild; the development and design of conversions on games such as Pac-Man and Donkey Kong for Coleco's home arcade video game system; and more recent design work, including the Age of Empires series, Quake II, and Quake III Arena. She painted the cover illustration for TSR's Dragon Mountain adventure.

Raised and educated mostly in southern Michigan, Jaquays and friends were early adopters of the D&D game, starting a game club which published a role playing fandom newsletter The Dungeoneer, much of which was written and illustrated by Jaquays. By 1976, Jaquays was contributing to Dragon magazine while bringing the newsletter to Judges Guild. During the first twenty years of the table top role playing industry, Jaquays's writing and art were published by Chaosium, Metagaming, Steve Jackson Games, Flying Buffalo, West End Games, Iron Crown Enterprises, Game Designers' Workshop, and Task Force Games. Jaquays also influenced the video game industry with significant works at Coleco, id Software, and Ensemble Studios. In 1995, collaborating with Lester W. Smith, Jaquays developed the Dragon Dice collectable dice game for TSR, contributing stylized dice icons and cover art.

Jaquays is regarded as an influential pioneer in the adventure game community. While working in Texas, Jaquays cofounded The Guildhall at SMU, a graduate-level game design education program at Southern Methodist University. Inducted in 2017 into the Academy of Adventure Gaming Arts & Design's Hall of Fame, Jaquays was posthumously given a Kate Wilhelm Solstice Award by the Science Fiction and Fantasy Writers of America for her "significant impact on the science fiction or fantasy landscape" in 2024. In the field of game design, "Jaquaysing" is a term which refers to a multiple path, non-linear, sometimes extra-dimensional approach in scenario writing, considered an innovation created by Jaquays.

== Early life and education ==
Jaquays was born on October 14, 1956, in Michigan and grew up in Michigan and Indiana. Jaquays graduated from Michigan's Jackson County Western High School in 1974 and Spring Arbor College in 1978 with a Bachelor of Arts in Fine Art.

== Career ==
=== The Dungeoneer and fantasy roleplaying ===
While still at college, Jaquays became interested in science-fiction and fantasy gaming and the nascent role-playing game industry through the pages of The Space Gamer which her brother had shared with her. Jaquays began playing Dungeons & Dragons in 1975 and created the Fantastic Dungeoning Society (FDS) with several college friends including Mark Hendricks. One of their projects was to publish a fanzine that would include adventures that other gamemasters could use. Tim Kask from TSR granted Jaquays a casual license to publish this amateur fanzine, and The Dungeoneer became one of the earliest periodicals for role-playing games.

The first issue, released in the same month as Dragon #1 (June 1976), was drawn and written primarily by Jaquays, with contributions by other members of the FDS. From 1976 to 1978 the FDS published six issues of The Dungeoneer. Marketed as a "dungeonmaster's publication," the magazine was noteworthy for its pioneering approach to pre-factored adventures. The first one, F'Chelrak's Tomb, appeared in June 1976, the same month as Wee Warriors published Palace of the Vampire Queen, known as the first published standalone fantasy role-playing adventure. The Dungeoneer proved to be an inspiration for many similarly themed magazines in the United States and elsewhere.

In addition to these "honest efforts at quality contents to interest readers," Jaquays began submitting artwork to TSR in 1976. Jaquays's work appeared in the premiere issue of The Dragon, and later contributions included the cover of issue #21.

=== Judges Guild, later independent role-playing projects, and TSR ===
Jaquays was preparing for graduation by late 1977 which meant spending more time working in the art studio, so FDS sold The Dungeoneer to Chuck Anshell of Anshell Miniatures. Anshell soon came to work at Judges Guild, a prolific provider of material and officially licensed products for TSR's Dungeons & Dragons (D&D) line, and brought The Dungeoneer with him; it became one of Judges Guild's two gaming periodicals. Jaquays also began working at Judges Guild in October 1978, spending a year there as an illustrator and designer for adventures, but refused to move to Decatur to work on-site at Judges Guild. Instead Jaquays worked out an arrangement to work from home in Michigan. Jaquays worked on two stand-alone D&D modules for Dungeons & Dragons, Dark Tower and Caverns of Thracia, which were completed before she left the company in October 1979. She provided a variety of content on a freelance basis thereafter, particularly to The Dungeoneer. Jaquays and Rudy Kraft authored Adventures Beyond the Pass for Judges Guild, who never published it; instead Greg Stafford published it through Chaosium as the adventure Griffin Mountain (1981). The MicroGame Chitin: I (1978) by Metagaming Concepts included illustrations by Jaquays. Jaquays, Denis Loubet, and Jeff Dee produced Cardboard Heroes in the early 1980s for Steve Jackson Games.

Jaquays expanded her career to include video game design in the early 1980s, but continued to work as a freelancer for various table-top game publishers including TSR, Chaosium, West End Games, Flying Buffalo, and Iron Crown Enterprises. She produced illustrations for Game Designers' Workshop (GDW), most notably creating all the starship illustrations in Traveller Supplement 9: Fighting Ships. A number of these became the basis for starship models from Ad Astra Games and the deckplans found in Mongoose Traveller Supplement 3 - Fighting Ships.

From 1986 to 1993, she did freelance work while running a design studio. Jaquays worked on a series of supplements focusing on character creation called Central Casting (1988–1991) to be published by Flying Buffalo, although they were instead published by Task Force Games. Jaquays also prepared three more supplements in the Citybook line out of house from 1990 to 1994 for Flying Buffalo. From 1993 to 1997, she returned to full-time employment in the table-top gaming industry as an illustrator for TSR, including a six-month period as Director of Graphics. She left TSR just before their takeover by Wizards of the Coast. During this time, she played an active role in the creation of the Dragon Dice game, both as cover artist and icon designer.

Jaquays's Dungeoneer work, but not the magazine itself, was later released back to her which was then collected and reprinted by Goodman Games in 2022.

=== Freelance artwork ===
In addition to many gaming artwork contributions (including artwork spread over two decades for TSR's first-line periodicals, Dragon and Dungeon), she worked as an illustrator and cartoonist for the Jackson Citizen Patriot in 1980. During the late 1980s, Jaquays was a regular interior artist for Amazing Stories, and contributed one cover for that publication.

=== Video game industry ===
Michael A. Stackpole worked for Coleco from 1980 to 1981, and was able to help his friend and fellow role-playing game designer Jaquays get hired at Coleco as well. After leaving Judges Guild, Jaquays worked for Coleco, first in a freelance capacity from 1980, then as a full-time employee from 1981 to 1985. She developed and designed arcade conversions of many well-known titles such as Pac-Man and Donkey Kong for their home arcade video game system. Jaquays eventually became director of game design. Jaquays assembled one of the first art and design studios for video game development at Coleco to make ColecoVision games. During a freelance design studio period in the late 1980s and early 1990s, she continued to be involved in the video game industry, with concept and design work for Epyx, Interplay Entertainment, and Electronic Arts.

From March 1997, Jaquays was employed as level designer for id Software, best known for their Quake series of video games. She then moved to the Dallas-based Ensemble Studios, which had "become a haven for ex-id Software developers." She worked there from early 2002, with former tabletop and computer gaming contemporary Sandy Petersen, until the company's closure in January 2009. Petersen had previously hired Jaquays to be a content designer at id Software. In 2003 Jaquays co-founded The Guildhall at SMU, a video game education program, located at the Plano campus of Southern Methodist University (SMU) in Dallas. She helped create much of the program's original curriculum. Jaquays worked as an advisor to The Guildhall program. As of October 2009, Jaquays was employed as a senior-level designer with the North American division of Iceland's CCP Games.

Jennell divided her creative energy between projects for design studio Dragongirl Studios, her Fifth Wall brand of game adventures and miniatures, and serving as the creative director for Olde Sküül, Inc., a digital game developer and publisher based in Seattle, Washington which she founded with three other veteran female developers in 2012.

== Activism ==
As creative director for the Transgender Human Rights Institute in Seattle, Jennell Jaquays was involved in the petition to create "Leelah's Law," outlawing conversion therapy of LGBT youth. In response to the petition, President Barack Obama called for the banning of conversion therapy for minors in April 2015.

== Legacy ==
The New York Times noted that "two of her earliest D&D modules, Dark Tower and The Caverns of Thracia, are renowned for their pathbreaking designs". Many contemporary modules had linear designed dungeons while Jaquays's adventure modules "often contained several possible entrances and multiple avenues, some of them secret, by which players could accomplish their goals". Academic Asa Roast, in the journal article A Preliminary Geography of the (Mega)Dungeon, highlighted that Jaquays's non-linear and multi-solution dungeons are characterized by their "complexity and dynamism". Roast wrote:

Analysis of her writing and design of megadungeon-like spaces has been particularly prominent in online discussion of the experience of dungeoneering, as her dungeons are thought to have pioneered principles which produce a particularly satisfying and engaging space to navigate. [...] These spaces are thus frustrating and difficult to navigate, but also present the PCs with a wide range of resources which can be combined and exploited in novel ways, including those which may not have been anticipated or imagined by the designer themselves. [...] Jaquays dungeons are also characterised by incorporating extra-dimensional or nested spaces within 'normal' dungeons. Such designs make the spatial practice of dungeoneering more dynamic and interesting than a series of simple choices by creating a more complex and variable landscape within the overall infrastructure of play provided by the megadungeon.

In game design, her name has "become a verb – 'Jaquaysing (Note: Originally coined by Justin Alexander in 2010 as "Jaquaying".) the dungeon' means creating a scenario with myriad paths". When asked about the origins of this design ethos, Jaquays commented:

My earliest dungeon designs nearly all had multiple paths through them and I tried to create situations that could be solved by cleverness as much as they could be combat. The process was both organic as I drew maps, and unconscious. I wasn't deliberately trying to create non-linearity. In fact, I don't think we really became aware of non-linearity in adventure design until published adventures began emphasizing linearity in design. [...] If everything is on the same path, you're not really making exploration choices. Variable paths through a setting allow for meaningful exploration choices.

== Personal life and death ==
Jaquays was married three times. Jaquays had two children from her first marriage. Jaquays announced in December 2011 that she was a lesbian and trans woman. She resided in Seattle, Washington, with her wife Rebecca Heineman.

Jaquays died from complications of Guillain–Barré syndrome at a hospital in Dallas on January 10, 2024, at the age of 67. A memorial project titled Return to Perinthos, organized by the Jennell Jaquays Memorial Game Jam, launched that month to raise funds for Jaquays's family and the Trans Lifeline. Return to Perinthos is a mega-dungeon that a gamemaster can "slot into most fantasy or adjacent tabletop RPG campaigns" and evokes "the layout and style of classic Dungeons & Dragons adventure Caverns of Thracia, which Jaquays authored".

== Awards and honors ==
=== Dark Tower ===
Jaquays's Dark Tower was nominated for the 1979 H.G. Wells award for Best Roleplaying Adventure. In November 2004, as part of the 30th anniversary celebration for Dungeons & Dragons, Dungeon magazine produced a list of the "thirty greatest D&D Adventures of All Time." Dark Tower was the only entry on the list not published by TSR.

=== Griffin Mountain ===
Jaquays was co-author and illustrator for Chaosium's Griffin Mountain RuneQuest scenario. Set in Glorantha, this highly praised scenario was nominated for the 1981 H.G. Wells award. The reworked version, Griffin Island, was nominated for the same award in 1986.

=== WarGames ===
Coleco's Wargames, for which Jaquays was co-designer of gameplay, won the 1984 Summer C.E.S. original software award.

=== Castle Greyhawk ===
As a level designer for TSR's Castle Greyhawk module, Jaquays shared the 1989 Origins Gamer's Choice Award for "Best Role-Playing Adventure."

=== Activism ===
- In 2015, Jaquays was a "Trans 100 2015" Honoree.
- In 2017, Jaquays was honored as one of the "Top 50 Transgender Americans You Should Know" by LGBTQ Nation.

=== Other recognition ===
- Jaquays's contributions to the early video game industry are recognized in the collectible trading card series "Walter Day's Superstars of 2015", where Jaquays is featured on Card #2036, which notes that she was one of the women interviewed for the documentary film "No Princess in the Castle."
- In 2017, the Academy of Adventure Gaming Arts & Design inducted Jaquays into their Hall of Fame, and she was an Origins Game Fair Guest of Honor.
- Jaquays was posthumously awarded the Kate Wilhelm Solstice Award at the 2024 Nebula Awards.

== Works ==
Partial bibliography of works in print

- The Dungeoneer (D&D fanzine) (editor 1976–77; contributor 1976–79)
- Dark Tower (AD&D Scenario – Judges Guild:88) (1980; revised 2001, 2007)
- The Caverns of Thracia (D&D Scenario – Judges Guild:102) (1979; revised 2004)
- Legendary Duck Tower and Other Tales (Runequest Scenario – Judges Guild:220) (1980) (with Rudy Kraft)
- The Unknown Gods (D&D Sourcebook – Judges Guild:420) (1980) (co-author)
- Griffin Mountain (Runequest Campaign Setting) (1981; revised and expanded 1986 as Griffin Island) (with Rudy Kraft and Greg Stafford)
- Cults of Terror (Runequest Sourcebook) (1981) (co-author)
- The Enchanted Wood (DragonQuest Module) (1981)
- Talons of Night (D&D Module:M5) (1987)
- The Shattered Statue (AD&D/DragonQuest Module:DQ1) (1987)
- Egg of the Phoenix (AD&D Module:I12) (1987) (with Frank Mentzer)
- Terror in Skytumble Tor (part of AD&D Module: I13) (1987)
- Castle Greyhawk (AD&D Module:WG7) (1988) (credited as one of the co-authors; wrote Level 4)
- The Savage Frontier (AD&D Module:FR5) (1988)
- Central Casting: Heroes of Legend (Generic Sourcebook) (1988)
- Campaign Sourcebook and Catacomb Guide (AD&D 2nd edition sourcebook:DMGR1) (1990)
- Citybook VI – Uptown (1992) (co-author)
- Shadows on the Borderland (Runequest Adventure) (1993) (co-author)
- Country Sites (1995) (cover artist)

Partial list of video game credits

Title	Released	System name	Role
Donkey Kong	July 1982	ColecoVision	Project leader, design, and graphics conversion
Omega Race	1983	ColecoVision	Project leader, design, and graphics conversion
WarGames	1984	ColecoVision	Project leader, gameplay co-designer
4x4 Off-Road Racing	1988	Amstrad CPC, Atari ST, Amiga, DOS, Commodore 64, MSX, ZX Spectrum	Game design
The Bard's Tale IV	1991–1992	(unpublished)	Rewrite and integration
Quake II	December 9, 1997	Amiga (68k), AmigaOS 4 (PowerPC), Nintendo 64, Macintosh, BeOS, Linux, Windows, PlayStation, Zeebo	Designer and level designer
Quake III Arena	December 2, 1999	Linux, Microsoft Windows, IRIX, Mac OS, Dreamcast, PlayStation 2, Xbox Live Arcade	Designer and level designer
Quake III: Team Arena	December 2000		Designer and level designer
Age of Empires III	October 18, 2005	Microsoft Windows, Mac OS X, Windows Mobile, N-Gage	Artist
Age of Empires III: The WarChiefs	March 7, 2006	Windows, Mac OS X	Artist
Halo Wars	February 26, 2009	Xbox 360	Artist and level designer

== See also ==
- List of video game industry people
