= Judges Guild =

Role playing game publisher

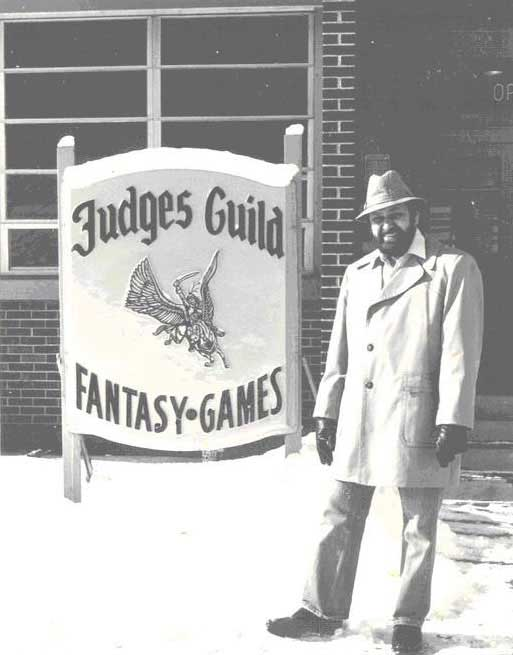
Bob Bledsaw at Judges Guild's Sunnyside Road location in Decatur, Illinois

Judges Guild is a game publisher that has been active since 1976. The company created and sold many role-playing game supplements, periodicals and related materials. During the late 1970s and early 1980s the company was one of the leading publishers of Dungeons & Dragons related materials. Its flagship product, City State of the Invincible Overlord, was the first published RPG supplement to feature a fully developed city environment. The supplement was followed closely by numerous ancillary cities, maps, and other materials published by Judges Guild.

== History ==
Judges Guild was founded on July 4, 1976, utilizing concepts developed by co-founder Bob Bledsaw, in his home Dungeons & Dragons (D&D) campaign. Bledsaw, along with partner Bill Owen, travelled to Lake Geneva, Wisconsin to visit the headquarters of Tactical Studies Rules (TSR), publishers of Dungeons & Dragons, on July 17, 1976. Bledsaw and Owen had hoped to convince TSR to publish some of the materials they used in their D&D campaigns, as well as Owen's rules for a game set during the American Civil War. While at TSR, they met with D&D co-creator Dave Arneson, who gave Bledsaw and Owen verbal approval to produce some supplemental game materials (known as "play aids") for both Dungeons & Dragons and Advanced Dungeons & Dragons (AD&D). At that time, TSR's only published play aids for D&D were the Dungeon Geomorphs, and the general feeling at TSR was that no one would be interested in supplemental materials. All materials were subject to review in order to maintain continuity within the game systems.

Owen subsequently left the partnership, and Judges Guild was incorporated in 1978. The company rapidly gained popularity amongst D&D fans for their prolific product line and then-unprecedented detail, at a time when such sources were rare. At its peak in the early 1980s, the firm employed 42 people and had over 250 products in print.

Even by that point, however, the company's fortunes were declining. Its production values were stagnant as the roleplaying games industry moved to professional typesetting, full color art, and slick and hardcovered material, elements Judges Guild was slow to adopt. Further, the Judges Guild fantasy RPG products—their biggest sellers—remained in their 1970s dungeoneering paradigm, replete with puns, dungeon gauntlets, and isolated cities in howling wildernesses, even as newer companies published more integrated products favoring the growing realism movement. Its license to publish Advanced Dungeons & Dragons materials lapsed in 1982. Judges Guild published City-State of Tarantis in 1983 to little notice, and the firm was on hiatus by 1985.

Subsequently, Gamescience published reprints of some of the Judges Guild adventures, while Mayfair Games obtained a publishing contract to produce a Mayfair City-State of the Invincible Overlord, which they repackaged in 1987 with many ill-received changes.

== Historical products ==
The most popular products were the original City-State maps and book, Tegel Manor and Judge's Shield, a foldout three-page heavy stock compilation of monsters and rules (that were, at the time, scattered across numerous TSR rulebooks) for quick reference; the term became standard for all subsequent similar products industry-wide. The company also produced licensed products for Advanced Dungeons & Dragons, Traveller, Chivalry & Sorcery, DragonQuest, Empire of the Petal Throne, Tunnels and Trolls, RuneQuest, Superhero 2044 and Villains and Vigilantes. Judges Guild also produced some generic supplements, as well as three RPG magazines, The Judges Guild Journal, The Dungeoneer and Pegasus.

== Return ==
Judges Guild returned in 1999, selling revised copies of the City State of the Invincible Overlord, a reintroduction of Pegasus magazine that lasted two issues (#14 & #15), the Revised Treasury of Archaic Names, and an edited version of Dark Tower, in addition to classic original products; the company also produced products for the d20 System.

In 2002, Necromancer Games, under license and in cooperation with Bledsaw and other original Judges Guild writers published revised editions of the City State of the Invincible Overlord, the Player's Guide to the Wilderlands, the Wilderlands of High Fantasy compilation boxed set and a revised edition of Caverns of Thracia, all for use with the d20 System.

In 2006, Judges Guild announced that it licensed the Wilderlands of High Fantasy setting to James Mishler's Adventure Games Publishing, which would publish a variant campaign setting, the Wilderlands of High Adventure, as well as Wilderlands products compatible with the Necromancer Games edition, using the Castles & Crusades rules rather than the generic d20 System rules.

Also in 2006 Judges Guild licensed Goodman Games and Eostros Games to publish revised editions of The Thieves of Fortress Badabaskor, Citadel of Fire and Dark Tower, updated for the d20 System. They were all released in 2007.

Founder Bob Bledsaw died of cancer in 2008. The company was inherited by his son, Bob Bledsaw II. In 2011, Lost Man's Trail was published. This marked the first original product Judges Guild had produced in over 25 years. Lost Man's Trail was the last manuscript the elder Bob Bledsaw worked on before his death.

In 2014 Judges Guild and Goodman Games partnered to release deluxe hardback editions of the original Judges Guild products, including accompanying pages from The Judges Guild Journal.

== See also ==
- List of Judges Guild publications
