= Kevin Long (artist) =

American artist

Kevin Long is an American graphic artist best known for his airbrush paintings and black-and-white illustrations in the genres of science fiction and fantasy. He was a principal artist at Palladium Books from 1986 until 1995 and served as one of the original contributors to the Rifts role-playing game (RPG) series.

== Biography ==
Kevin Long grew up in Battle Creek, Michigan and attended the College for Creative Studies in Detroit, where he majored in advertising illustration. Upon graduating, Long worked in the local advertising industry. Having completed a five-year stint in his chosen profession, he was lured away by the artistic and creative freedom offered by Palladium Books. While there, Long built his reputation as one of the most popular illustrators in the role-playing industry. In addition to having created the dynamic look of various characters, vehicles, and equipment in Rifts, he co-authored a number of other Palladium RPG titles. However, Long left Palladium in August 1995 for unspecified reasons.

In October 1997, Raven Software hired Long as a 2-D artist. He was responsible for some of the graphics in Hexen II: Portal of Praevus (1998), Heretic II (1998), Soldier of Fortune (2000), Star Trek: Voyager – Elite Force (2000), Soldier of Fortune II: Double Helix (2002), and Quake 4 (2005). In 2007, Long was the Art Lead on Wolfenstein.

== Reception ==
In 2014, Scott Taylor of Black Gate, named Kevin Long as Honorable Mention in a list of The Top 10 RPG Artists of the Past 40 Years, saying "Robotech, even above Rifts in my mind, reflects the soul of Palladium, and over the course of three decades Long's work has helped bring the fabled Japanese animation series into the forefront of American science fiction role-playing."

In his 2023 book Monsters, Aliens, and Holes in the Ground, RPG historian Stu Horvath reviewed the multi-genre role-playing game Rifts and noted, "The real star of Rifts' art is the clean, technical line work that Kevin Long provided for the game's first five years. He does a masterful job making all of the disparate elements seem cool and cohesive — magic and tech and high tech and super-high-tech and psionics and animal people and faction and after faction — and so many skulls!"

== Role-playing game artwork credits ==
Works are listed in order of publication date within their respective categories.

=== Palladium Books ===
==== Beyond the Supernatural ====
- McCall, R.; Siembieda, K. & Wujcik, E. (October 1987). Beyond the Supernatural: A Role-Playing Game of Contemporary Horror. ISBN 978-0-916211-18-9. [Out of Print] – Interior art.
- Siembieda, K.; Long, K.; Wujcik, E. & Garwood, B. (October 1990). Boxed Nightmares: An Adventure Sourcebook for Beyond the Supernatural. ISBN 978-0-916211-41-7. [Out of Print] – Additional text and ideas, interior art and photographs.
- Siembieda, K. (January 2005). Beyond the Supernatural, Second Edition. Palladium Books, Incorporated. ISBN 978-1-57457-083-0. – Interior art.

==== Heroes Unlimited ====
- Long, K.; Siembieda, K.; Sheiring, S.; Marciniszyn, A.; Rosenstein, J.; Wujcik, E.; Gustovich, M. & Donald-Siembieda, A. (May 1992). Villains Unlimited: A Sourcebook for Heroes Unlimited (1st ed.). ISBN 978-0-916211-49-3. [Out of Print] – Coauthor, cover and interior art.
- Breaux, W. Jr. & Siembieda, K. (December 1994). Aliens Unlimited: A Sourcebook for Heroes Unlimited (1st ed.). ISBN 978-0-916211-76-9. [Out of Print] – Cover art.
- Siembieda, K.; Breaux, W. Jr.; Wujcik, E.; Long, K.; Oliver, A. & Trustrum, S. (March 1998). Heroes Unlimited, Revised Second Edition. ISBN 978-1-57457-006-9. – Additional text and concepts, interior art.
- Siembieda, K. & Breaux, W. Jr. (June 1999). Heroes Unlimited G.M.'s Guide. ISBN 978-1-57457-035-9. – Interior art.
- Breaux, W. Jr. & Siembieda, K. (January 2000). Aliens Unlimited: A Sourcebook for Heroes Unlimited, Second Edition (Rev. ed.). ISBN 978-0-916211-76-9. – Cover art.
- Coffin, B. & Siembieda, K. (February 2000). Century Station: An Adventure Sourcebook for Heroes Unlimited, Second Edition. ISBN 978-1-57457-040-3. – Interior art.
- Long, K.; Siembieda, K. & Gustovich, M. (March 2005). Villains Unlimited: A Sourcebook for Heroes Unlimited (Rev. ed.). Palladium Books. ISBN 978-0-916211-49-3. – Coauthor, interior art.

==== Macross II ====
- Siembieda, K. (July 1993). Macross II: The Role-Playing Game. ISBN 978-0-916211-62-2. [Out of Print] – Cover art.
- Ouellette, M.; Vézina, M. & Carrières, J. (March 1994). Macross II: Spacecraft and Deck Plans—Volume One. ISBN 978-0-916211-66-0. [Out of Print] – Cover art.
- Ouellette, M.; Vézina, M. & Carrières, J. (July 1994). Macross II: Spacecraft and Deck Plans—Volume Two. ISBN 978-0-916211-74-5. [Out of Print] – Cover art.
- Ouellette, M.; Vézina, M.; Carrières, J. & Pelletier, C. J. (December 1994). Macross II: Spacecraft and Deck Plans—Volume Three. ISBN 978-0-916211-75-2. [Out of Print] – Cover art.

==== Nightbane ====
- Martijena-Carella, C. J. & Siembieda, K. (November 1995). Nightbane: A Complete Role-Playing Game. ISBN 978-0-916211-86-8. – Interior art [uncredited].
- Vey, J. & Siembieda, K. (April 2003). Nightbane World Book 4: Shadows of Light. ISBN 978-1-57457-088-5. – Interior art [uncredited].

==== Palladium Fantasy Role-Playing Game ====
- Bartold, T.; Boucher, G. S.; Davies, K.; Gomez, J.; Long, K.; Marciniszyn, A.; Siembieda, K. & Wujcik, E. (October 1989). The Palladium Role-Playing Game Book IV: Adventures in the Northern Wilderness. ISBN 978-0-916211-39-4. [Out of Print] – Coauthor, additional art.
- Siembieda, K. & Wujcik, E. (March 1990). The Palladium RPG (7th printing, Rev. ed.). ISBN 978-0-916211-04-2. [Out of Print] – Cover art.
- Nowak, P. & Siembieda, K. (October 1994). Palladium RPG Book VII: Yin-Sloth Jungles. ISBN 978-0-916211-81-3. – Interior art.
- Siembieda, K. (April 1996). Palladium Fantasy RPG, Second Edition. ISBN 978-0-916211-91-2. – Interior art [uncredited].
- Siembieda, K. & Wujcik, E. (December 1996). Dragons & Gods: A Sourcebook for the Palladium Fantasy RPG, Second Edition. ISBN 978-0-916211-98-1. – Interior art.
- Coffin, B. & Siembieda, K. (September 1998). Palladium Fantasy RPG Book 8: The Western Empire. ISBN 978-1-57457-015-1. – Interior art.
- Wujcik, E.; Siembieda, K.; Coffin, B.; Bartold, T.; Marciniszyn, A.; Jacques, C. & Long, K. (February 2003). Wolfen Empire Adventure Sourcebook. ISBN 978-1-57457-063-2. – Additional text and concepts, interior art.

==== Rifts ====
Core

- Siembieda, K. (August 1990). Rifts Role-Playing Game. ISBN 978-0-916211-50-9. [Out of Print] – Interior art and paintings.
- Siembieda, K.; Bellaire, C.; Therrien, S.; Ward, T. & Wujcik, E. (August 2005). Rifts Role-Playing Game, Ultimate Edition. ISBN 978-1-57457-150-9. – Interior art, Rifts logo design.

World

- Siembieda, K. & Sheiring, S. (July 1991). Rifts World Book (RWB) One: Vampire Kingdoms. ISBN 978-0-916211-52-3. – [Out of Print] Cover and interior art.
- Siembieda, K.; Sheiring, S. & Marciniszyn, A. (September 1992). RWB Two: Atlantis. ISBN 978-0-916211-54-7. – Interior art.
- Siembieda, K.; Sheiring, S. & Marciniszyn, A. (March 1993). RWB Three: England. ISBN 978-0-916211-57-8. – Interior art.
- Siembieda, K.; Long, K. & Rosenstein, J. (June 1993). RWB Four: Africa. ISBN 978-0-916211-58-5. – Additional text and ideas, cover and interior art.
- Siembieda, K. & Long, K. (February 1994). RWB Five: Triax and the NGR. ISBN 978-0-916211-60-8. – Additional designs and concepts, cover and interior art.
- Martijena-Carella, C. J. & Siembieda, K. (September 1994). RWB Six: South America. ISBN 978-0-916211-71-4. – Interior art.
- Siembieda, K.; Carella, C. J.; Sheiring, S.; Long, K. & Rosenstein, J. (May 1995). RWB Seven: Underseas. ISBN 978-0-916211-72-1. – Additional concepts, interior art.
- Siembieda, K.; Nowak, P. & Carella, C. J. (July 1995). RWB Eight: Japan. ISBN 978-0-916211-88-2. – Interior art [uncredited].
- Martijena-Carella, C. J. & Siembieda, K. (July 1995). RWB Nine: South America 2. ISBN 978-0-916211-89-9. – Cover art; interior art [uncredited].
- Martijena-Carella, C. J. & Siembieda, K. (March 1996). RWB Ten: Juicer Uprising. ISBN 978-0-916211-92-9. – Interior art [uncredited].
- Siembieda, K.; Nowak, P. & Rosensten, J. (July 1996). RWB 11: Coalition War Campaign. ISBN 978-0-916211-93-6. – Interior art.
- Siembieda, K. & Rosenstein, J. (April 1997). RWB 13: Lone Star. ISBN 978-1-57457-000-7. – Interior art [uncredited].
- Siembieda, K.; Sumimoto, M. & Cartier, R. (December 1998). RWB 18: Mystic Russia. ISBN 978-1-57457-011-3. – Interior art [uncredited].
- Sumimoto, M. & Siembieda, K. (September 1999). RWB 21: Atlantis Two—Splynn Dimensional Market. ISBN 978-1-57457-027-4. – Interior art [uncredited].
- Siembieda, K.; DesRochers, F. & Coffin, B. (April 2000). RWB 22: Free Quebec. ISBN 978-1-57457-030-4. – Interior art [uncredited].
- Siembieda, K. & Yoho, T. S. (June 2004). RWB 26: Dinosaur Swamp. ISBN 978-1-57457-104-2. – Interior art.
- Siembieda, K. & Yoho, T. S. (February 2006). RWB 27: Adventures in Dinosaur Swamp. ISBN 978-1-57457-120-2. – Interior art.
- Richards, J. & Siembieda, K. (March 2006). RWB 28: Arzno—Vampire Incursion. ISBN 978-1-57457-157-8. – Interior art.
- Marciniszyn, A.; Smith, W. & Siembieda, K., eds. (April 2007). RWB 30: D-Bees of North America. ISBN 978-1-57457-170-7. – Interior art [uncredited].
- White, T.; Aten, B. K. & Siembieda, K. (April 2010). RWB 31: Triax 2. ISBN 978-1-57457-181-3. – Contributing artist.
- Siembieda, K.; Clements, M.; Campbell, B. (August 2011). RWB One: Vampire Kingdoms, New Revised Edition. ISBN 978-1-57457-186-8. – Interior art.

Dimension

- Siembieda, K.; Truman, T. & Henry, F. (November 1993). Rifts Dimension Book (RDB) One: Wormwood. ISBN 978-0-916211-59-2. – Interior art [uncredited].
- Martijena-Carella, C. J. & Siembieda, K. (December 1994). RDB Two: Phase World. ISBN 978-0-916211-73-8. – Cover and interior art.
- Martijena-Carella, C. J. & Siembieda, K. (March 1995). RDB Three: Phase World Sourcebook. ISBN 978-0-916211-79-0. – Cover and interior art.

- Siembieda, K. (February 1991). Rifts Sourcebook (RSB) Number One. ISBN 978-0-916211-51-6. [Out of Print] – Cover and interior art.
- Siembieda, K. (September 1992). RSB Two: The Mechanoids. ISBN 978-0-916211-55-4. – Cover and interior art.
- Siembieda, K. (July 1994). RSB Three: Mindwerks. ISBN 978-0-916211-69-1. – Cover and interior art.
- Siembieda, K.; Marciniszyn, A.; Rosenstein, J.; Coffin, B.; Sheiring, S. & Smith, W. (September 2002). Rifts Bionics Sourcebook. ISBN 978-1-57457-075-5. – Cover and interior art.
- Siembieda, K. (February 2007). RSB One, Revised & Expanded. ISBN 978-1-57457-151-6. – Interior art.
- Siembieda, K.; Campbell, B.; Clements, M. & Kluge, C. (April 2013). Rifts Vampires Sourcebook. ISBN 978-1-57457-187-5. – Interior art.

Conversion

- Siembieda, K. (November 1991). Rifts Conversion Book (RCB). ISBN 978-0-916211-53-0. [Out of Print] – Cover and additional art.
- Carella, C. J. & Siembieda, K. (April 1994). RCB Two: Pantheons of the Megaverse. ISBN 978-1-57457-154-7. – Interior art.
- Siembieda, K. (November 2002). RCB One, Revised Edition. ISBN 978-0-916211-53-0. – Cover and additional art.
- Siembieda, K.; Carella, C. J.; Coffin, B.; Gleba, C. & McCall, R. (December 2002). Rifts Dark Conversions. ISBN 978-1-57457-079-3. – Interior art.

Other

- Carella, C. J. & Siembieda, K. (July 1994). Rifts Mercenaries. ISBN 978-0-916211-70-7. – Cover and interior art.
- Crawford, C., ed. (February 1996). Rifts Index & Adventures—Volume One. ISBN 978-0-916211-95-0. [Out of Print] – Interior art.
- Crawford, C., ed. (December 1997). Rifts Index & Adventures—Volume Two. ISBN 978-1-57457-008-3. – Cover and interior art.
- Siembieda, K. & Coffin, B. (June 2000). Rifts Coalition Wars: Siege on Tolkeen—Chapter One: Sedition. ISBN 978-1-57457-045-8. – Interior art [uncredited].
- Coffin, B. & Siembieda, K., eds. (September 2001). Rifts Game Master Guide. ISBN 978-1-57457-067-0. – Interior art.
- Coffin, B., ed. (October 2001). Rifts Book of Magic. ISBN 978-1-57457-069-4. – Interior art.
- Siembieda, K. & Coffin, B. (April 2002). Rifts Aftermath, 109 P.A.: Life After Tolkeen and a World Overview. ISBN 978-1-57457-068-7. – Interior art [uncredited].

==== Robotech ====
Illustration of a Veritech Alpha Fighter in battloid mode, from The Robotech Role-Playing Game Book Five: The Invid Invasion (May 1988).

- Siembieda, K. (November 1986). Robotech: The Role-Playing Game—Book One: Macross. ISBN 978-0-916211-21-9. [Out of Print] – Cover and interior art.
- Siembieda, K. (March 1987). The Robotech RPG Book Two: RDF Manual. ISBN 978-0-916211-23-3. [Out of Print] – Cover and interior art.
- Siembieda, K. (March 1987). The Robotech RPG Book Three: Zentraedi. ISBN 978-0-916211-22-6. [Out of Print] – Cover art.
- Siembieda, K. (September 1987). The Robotech RPG Book Four: Southern Cross. ISBN 978-0-916211-27-1. [Out of Print] – Cover and interior art.
- Jacques, C. & Siembieda, K. (February 1988). Robotech RPG Adventures: Ghost Ship. ISBN 978-0-916211-29-5. [Out of Print] – Cover art.
- Siembieda, K. (May 1988). The Robotech RPG Book Five: Invid Invasion. ISBN 978-0-916211-28-8. [Out of Print] – Cover and additional art.
- Siembieda, K. (September 1988). Robotech II: The Role-Playing Game—The Sentinels. ISBN 978-0-916211-33-2. [Out of Print] – Cover and interior art.
- Siembieda, K. (March 1989). Robotech II: The Role-Playing Game—REF Field Guide. ISBN 978-0-916211-36-3. [Out of Print] – Cover and additional art.
- Gomez, J.; Frater, J.; Marciniszyn, A.; Long, K. & Siembieda, K. (December 1989). Robotech RPG Adventures: Lancer's Rockers. ISBN 978-0-916211-42-4. [Out of Print] – Additional text and ideas, cover and interior art.
- Christian, D. & Siembieda, K. (May 1994). Robotech RPG Adventures: Zentraedi Breakout. ISBN 978-0-916211-67-7. [Out of Print] – Interior art.
- Hassall, K. & Siembieda, K. (April 1995). Robotech RPG Book Seven: New World Order. ISBN 978-0-916211-84-4. [Out of Print] – Cover and interior art.
- Breaux, W. Jr. & Siembieda, K. (July 1995). Robotech RPG Book Eight: Strike Force. ISBN 978-0-916211-85-1. [Out of Print] – Cover art.
- Siembieda, K. & Marker, J. (March 2008). Robotech: The Shadow Chronicles Role-Playing Game. Palladium Books. ISBN 978-1-57457-133-2. – Interior art.

==== Teenage Mutant Ninja Turtles ====
- Wujcik, E. (April 1989). Transdimensional Teenage Mutant Ninja Turtles. ISBN 978-0-916211-35-6. [Out of Print] – Cover art.
- Trostle, J. & Siembieda, K. (November 1989). Truckin' Turtles. ISBN 978-0-916211-43-1. [Out of Print] – Cover art.
- Greenberg, D. & Siembieda, K. (March 1990). Turtles Go Hollywood. ISBN 978-0-916211-46-2. [Out of Print] – Cover and interior art.

==== The Rifter ====
- Smith, W., ed. (January 1998). "Rifter Number One". The Rifter: Sourcebook and Guide to the Palladium Megaverse (1). ISBN 978-1-57457-009-0. [Out of Print] – Cover and interior art.
- —, ed. (April 1998). "Rifter Number Two". The Rifter (2). ISBN 978-1-57457-012-0. [Out of Print] – Interior art.
- —, ed. (October 1998). The Rifter (4). ISBN 978-1-57457-014-4. [Out of Print] – Interior art.
- —, ed. (January 1999). The Rifter (5). ISBN 978-1-57457-020-5. [Out of Print] – Cover art.
- —, ed. (April 1999). The Rifter (6). ISBN 978-1-57457-024-3. [Out of Print] – Interior art [uncredited].
- —, ed. (July 1999). The Rifter (7). ISBN 978-1-57457-033-5. [Out of Print] – Interior art [uncredited].
- —, ed. (January 2001). "Rifter Thirteen". The Rifter (13). ISBN 978-1-57457-048-9. [Out of Print] – Cover art.
- —, ed. (July 2001). "Rifter Fifteen". The Rifter (15). ISBN 978-1-57457-056-4. [Out of Print] – Interior art [uncredited].
- —, ed. (October 2001). "Rifter Sixteen". The Rifter (16). ISBN 978-1-57457-057-1. [Out of Print] – Interior art [uncredited].
- —, ed. (January 2002). "Rifter Seventeen". The Rifter (17). ISBN 978-1-57457-070-0. [Out of Print] – Interior art [uncredited].
- —, ed. (April 2002). "Rifter Eighteen". The Rifter (18). ISBN 978-1-57457-071-7. [Out of Print] – Interior art [uncredited].
- —, ed. (July 2002). "The Rifter Number Nineteen: Your Guide to the Megaverse". The Rifter (19). ISBN 978-1-57457-076-2. [Out of Print] – Interior art [uncredited].
- —, ed. (October 2002). "Rifter Twenty". The Rifter (20). ISBN 978-1-57457-077-9. [Out of Print] – Cover art; interior art [uncredited].
- —, ed. (January 2003). "Rifter Twenty One". The Rifter (21). ISBN 978-1-57457-080-9. [Out of Print] – Cover art.
- —, ed. (July 2003). The Rifter (23). ISBN 978-1-57457-089-2. [Out of Print] – Interior art [uncredited].
- —, ed. (July 2005). The Rifter (31). ISBN 978-1-57457-155-4. – Interior art [uncredited].
- —, ed. (January 2006). "The Rifter 33". The Rifter (33). ISBN 978-1-57457-159-2. – Interior art.
- —, ed. (February 2006). "Best of the Rifter". Best of "The Rifter". ISBN 978-1-57457-160-8. – Cover and interior art.
- —, ed. (October 2007). The Rifter (40). ISBN 978-1-57457-131-8. – Cover art.
- —, ed. (April 2008). The Rifter (42). ISBN 978-1-57457-134-9. – Cover art.
- —, ed. (October 2010). The Rifter (52). ISBN 978-1-57457-189-9. – Interior art.
- —, ed. (July 2011). The Rifter (55). ISBN 978-1-57457-192-9. – Interior art.
- —, ed. (October 2011). The Rifter (56). ISBN 978-1-57457-193-6. – Interior art.

==== Miscellaneous ====
- Wujcik, E. (February 1987). Advanced RECON: Supplemental Rules and Adventures. ISBN 978-0-916211-24-0. [Out of Print] – Cover art.
- Balent, M. (April 1989). The Compendium of Weapons, Armour & Castles. ISBN 978-0-916211-38-7. [Out of Print] – Cover, armour, castle, and additional art.
- Wujcik, E. (August 1990). Ninjas & Superspies (Rev. ed.). ISBN 978-0-916211-31-8. – Interior art.
- Wallis, J. & Siembieda, K. (March 1992). Mutants in Orbit: An Adventure and Sourcebook for After the Bomb and Rifts. ISBN 978-0-916211-48-6. – Additional art.
- Wujcik, E. & Siembieda, K. (February 1995). Mystic China. ISBN 978-0-916211-77-6. – Interior art.
- Siembieda, K. & Siembieda, M., eds. (November 1999). The Collected "Magic of Palladium Books": A Time Capsule from 1988 to 1991. ASIN B00183P7X8. [Out of Print] – Cover art.
- Siembieda, K. (June 2003). Rifts Chaos Earth: A Complete Role-Playing Game. ISBN 978-1-57457-084-7. – Interior art [uncredited].

=== Shadowrun ===
- Kenson, S. (December 1996). Super Tuesday! (2nd ed.). Chicago, IL: FASA Corporation. ISBN 978-1-55560-303-8. (SKU 7322) [Out of Print] – Interior art.
- Szeto, J. (October 1997). Rigger 2 (2nd ed.). Chicago, IL: FASA Corporation. ISBN 978-1-55560-304-5. (SKU 7906) [Out of Print] – Interior art.
- Mulvihill, M. & Mulvihill, S. T. (January 2001). Rigger 3 (3rd ed.). Chicago, IL: FASA Corporation. ISBN 978-1-55560-402-8. (SKU 7910) – Interior art.
- Mulvihill, M. & Mulvihill, S. T. (September 2003). Rigger 3, Revised (3rd ed.). Erkrath, Germany: Fantasy Productions. ISBN 978-1-932564-04-4. (SKU 10662) – Interior art.

=== Other games ===
- Babcock, L. R., III; Bills, R. N.; Lewis, S. & Weisman, J. (June 2003). Classic BattleTech Master Rules (Rev. ed.). Erkrath, Germany: Fantasy Productions. ISBN 978-1-932564-45-7. – Interior art.
