= Robotech (role-playing game) =

Tabletop anime role-playing game

The Robotech Role-Playing Game
- Front cover of Book 1: Macross, the Robotech RPG core rulebook, illustrated by Kevin Long
- Designers: Kevin Siembieda
- Publishers: Palladium Books
- Years active: November 1986 – July 1998; March 2008 – March 2018
- Genres: Science fiction
- Languages: English
- Systems: Megaversal
- Website: palladiumbooks.com

The Robotech Role-Playing Game is a licensed science fiction role-playing game published by Palladium Books in 1986 that is based on the Robotech and Robotech II: The Sentinels anime television series, which were, in turn, based on the Japanese mecha anime television series Macross. A second edition of the game, based on Robotech: The Shadow Chronicles, was released in 2008.

== Description ==
The game is set in the Robotech universe. Players create characters by assigning random scores for eight attributes such as IQ, Mental Endurance and Physical Beauty. The player must also choose an occupation for the character such as Destroid Pilot or Communications Engineer.

The rulebook contains statistics for a variety of mecha, and combat rules are given for many different types of weapon systems.

=== Game system ===
The Robotech RPG uses a modified version of the Megaversal rule system used in the Palladium Fantasy Role-Playing Game introduced several years earlier. Clearly patterned after the fantasy role-playing game Dungeons & Dragons, the Palladium Fantasy RPG rules use a very similar rule system based around physical and mental statistics generated by rolling three six-sided dice, and the use of a 20-sided die in combat. Percentile dice are used for skill resolution. Robotech introduces the concept of mega-damage — "super" hit-points that are equivalent to 100 ordinary-person hit points — to simulate the toughness of the heavily armored mecha. This concept would later become widely used in Palladium's Rifts game.

== Publication history ==
In 1982, Studio Nue and Artland created the Japanese science fiction mecha anime media franchise/media mix Macross (マクロス, Makurosu; English: /məˈkrɒs/). This was translated and adapted into the American television series Robotech produced by Harmony Gold USA in association with Tatsunoko Production in 1985.

In 1986, Palladium Books acquired the game license for Robotech, and Kevin Siembieda designed the 110-page core rulebook titled Robotech the Role-Playing Game: The Macross Saga. The book contains rules for character creation, and personal and mecha combat, as well as descriptions and statistics for a variety of war machines.

Over the next three years, Palladium published five sourcebooks written by Siembieda that added depth to the campaign setting, roughly following the Robotech television series.

Another three sourcebooks and a number of adventures were also published by Palladium, written by various Palladium regulars and freelance authors.

Illustrations consisted of line art taken from original Japanese source material in addition to new black-and-white line art done by Palladium artists such as Kevin Long.

Palladium also published Macross II: The Role-Playing Game, a separate role-playing game based on the Macross II anime series, but this was entirely unrelated to the Robotech continuity.

=== Inaccuracies ===
The creators of Robotech originally lacked access to the complete source material, working against deadlines based on what could be gleaned from show footage and limited-scope translations. As a result of incomplete availability, compounded by animation and dubbing errors, some descriptions of mecha and weapon systems given in the first edition books are inconsistent with either the animation or subsequently uncovered source material. The confusion is particularly strong in the fourth sourcebook Southern Cross, where the many humanoid robots, battloids, and suits of armor are often confused for one another.

=== Cancellation ===
Contractual issues in the wake of Harmony Gold's aborted Robotech 3000 project, as well as a general refocusing of Palladium's production on its flagship Rifts line, caused Palladium to forgo renewing the Robotech license. The Robotech line went out of print as of June 30, 2001.

=== Reception to 1st edition ===
In his 1990 book The Complete Guide to Role-Playing Games, game critic Rick Swan noted that if terms like "Zentraedi" and "destruction of the SDF-1 and 2" were unfamiliar, "Robotech is probably not the giant robot game for you. But for fans ... Robotech is giant robot heaven, a remarkably detailed simulation ... that's as certain to satisfy the obsessed as it is to baffle the uninitiated." Swan questioned if some of the detail required for character creation was necessary, asking, for example, if "Physical Beauty will be relevant very often in Robotech adventures." But Swan found the war machine descriptions "faultless. Every nut, bolt, and circuit is lovingly detailed." Swan admitted that the combat rules might seem excessive, but pointed out that "they allow players to relish every smack, crunch, and spurt of a Mecha assault, which is what Robotech is all about." Swan concluded by giving the game a rating of 2.5 out of 4.

== Second edition (2008–2018) ==
In 2007 Palladium reacquired the Robotech license, coinciding with the DVD release of the animated feature film Robotech: The Shadow Chronicles. The new edition was released under the title Robotech: The Shadow Chronicles Role-Playing Game.

Palladium's license for the game expired on March 31, 2018, and was not renewed.

== Robotech RPG Tactics (2013-2018) ==
In 2013, Palladium Books ran a Kickstarter campaign to raise money to develop a new miniature wargaming system called Robotech RPG Tactics. The campaign raised $1,442,312 from 5,342 backers by its close on May 20, 2013, and Wave 1 of the game was shipped to backers in late 2014. However, delays marked Wave 2 of the game, and on 28 February 2018 it was announced that the Robotech RPG Tactics Wave Two rewards would not be realized, and that Palladium's license had expired and was not being renewed.

== Strange Machine Games ==
After Palladium lost the license, it was acquired by Strange Machine Games, which published a new version of the Robotech role-playing game. The first volume was released in December 2019. On November 2, 2021, Strange Machine Games finished funding of their second book, Robotech: Homefront. The book will feature the second and third seasons of Robotech, The Masters Saga and New Generations.

== Publications ==
=== First edition (1986–1998) ===
- Book One: Macross (November 1986)
- Book Two: Robotech Defense Force Manual (March 1987)
- Book Three: Zentraedi (March 1987)
- Book Four: Southern Cross (September 1987)
- The Robotech RPG Book Five: Invid Invasion (June 1988)
- Book Six: The Return of the Masters (July 1989)
- Book Seven: New World Order (April 1995)
- Book Eight: Strike Force (July 1995)

The Robotech RPG adventure books

1. Ghost Ship (February 1988)
2. Robotech Defense Force Accelerated Training Program (March 1988)
3. Lancer's Rockers (December 1989)
4. Zentraedi Breakout (May 1994)

Robotech II: The Sentinels

1. The Sentinels (September 1987)
2. Robotech Expeditionary Force Field Guide (March 1989)
