= Rifts Sourcebook 3: Mindwerks =

Rifts Sourcebook 3: Mindwerks is a 1994 role-playing supplement for Rifts published by Palladium Books.

== Contents ==
Rifts Sourcebook 3: Mindwerks is a supplement in which the New German Republic is detailed.

== Publication history ==
Mindwerks was the third release in the Rifts Sourcebook series and was intended as a companion volume for Rifts World Book 5: Triax and The NGR.

== Reception ==
Charles Peirce reviewed Mindwerks in White Wolf Inphobia #53 (March, 1995), rating it a 4 out of 5 and stated that "Self-described as 'what didn't make it into World Book Five," Mindwerks should have been World Book Five. It's definitely the better product, presenting a diversity of ideas that are simply absent in Triax and the NGR. If you want to campaign in Germany, this is the book that will prove most useful and thus most worth the money."

== Reviews ==
- Australian Realms #20
- The Familiar (Issue 5 - Aug 1995)
- Armadillo Droppings (Issue 31 - Winter/Spring 1995)
