= Rifts World Book 13: Lone Star =

1997 role-playing game supplement

Rifts World Book 13: Lone Star is a 1997 role-playing game supplement published by Palladium Books for Rifts.

== Contents ==
Rifts World Book 13: Lone Star is a supplement in which in the wastelands of Texas, it explores Lone Star City and the Coalition States' genetic engineering division, known for creating the Dog Boys—intelligent, humanoid canine soldiers bred for loyalty and combat. The book delves into the science behind their creation, offering new character classes, adversaries, and villains, along with adventure hooks. The second half shifts focus to the Pecos Empire, a chaotic region teeming with bandits, biker gangs, Native tribes, and undead ruins.

== Reception ==
Lucya Szachnowski reviewed Rifts Lone Star for Arcane magazine, rating it an 8 out of 10 overall, and stated that "If that doesn't give you enough material for months of gaming, the second half of the supplement goes into great depth about the Pecos Empire. The Pecos badlands hold everything you might expect to find in a spaghetti western, a Mad Max movie and maybe Dusk til' Dawn, with bandits, outlaws, Indian tribes, gangs on motorbikes and even a ruin full of undead."
