= Rifts World Book 4: Africa =

1993 role-playing supplementary material

Rifts World Book 4: Africa is a 1993 role-playing supplement for Rifts published by Palladium Books.

== Contents ==
Rifts World Book 4: Africa is a supplement in which Africa is detailed, with the Four Horsemen of the Apocalypse who threaten it and the rest of the world.

== Reception ==
Charles Peirce reviewed Rifts World Book Four: Africa in White Wolf #38 (1993), rating it a 3 out of 5 and stated that "All in all, Rifts: Africa is a fairly good sourcebook for information about Africa itself (though there are some rather annoying errors: no Tree People stats and no stats for Victor Lazlo), but as a Gamemaster I would be very wary about the inclusion and handling of the Four Horsemen within a campaign."

== Reviews ==
- The Last Province (Issue 5 - Aug / Sept 1993)
