= The Rifter =

Role-playing game magazine

The Rifter was a role-playing game magazine published by Palladium Books. It was based in Westland, Michigan.

Named after its most successful game at the time of debut, Rifts, its content pertained to all the games in the Palladium system, though after the first three years they ceased accepting articles specifically for games based on licenses (Specifically, Robotech, Macross II, and Teenage Mutant Ninja Turtles, but would have applied to any other licenses acquired), over concerns with the licensing agents.

== History ==
The Rifter
- Editor-in-chief: Wayne Smith
- Categories: Role-playing games
- Frequency: Quarterly
- Publisher: Kevin Siembieda
- First issue: The Magic of Palladium Books; June 1988; 38 years ago The Rifter; March 1998; 28 years ago
- Final issue: 2019
- Company: Palladium Books
- Country: United States
- Based in: Westland, Michigan, U.S.
- Language: English
- Website: www.palladiumbooks.com

In 1988 through 1991, Palladium published a small newsprint product called "The Magic of Palladium Books", meant for sale or give-away at stores and conventions. Consisting of seven issues, it had a letter column, errata for Palladium games, a few fan-submitted articles, and a selection of house ads and official supplements. The last issue was a double issue numbered 7/8, consisting of the contents of what had been planned for the two issues had they been printed separately.

After Wayne Smith joined Palladium, the subject of a new Palladium periodical along the line of West End Games Star Wars Adventure Journal was proposed, to cover the entire line of Palladium's role playing games. Like the WEG product, it would be printed more like a conventional sourcebook, to increase its durability. Wayne was named the editor for magazine, and Palladium Books began requesting submissions for The Rifter via word of mouth, forums, and posts on their now-defunct official mailing list, during 1997, with the first issue seeing print in the first quarter of 1998.

In 2019, the publication was placed on indefinite hiatus, with a possible return in two years. Citing a need to focus on the primary game supplements, the company ended the magazine's run with issue 84.

== Special Issues ==
Beyond standard numbering, there is also a digital-only "The Rifter 0", a "Best of The Rifter" compilation released in 2006 for the Palladium 25th anniversary, and a limited-edition "Wayne Smith's The Rifter 9.5". The 9.5 issue was an "April Fools" issue compiled of comedy, parody and satire subjects, mostly ones that would not have fit the themes of the standard issues, and had been accumulating in the submission pile. It was assembled, printed & solicited to distributors without editor Wayne Smith's knowledge by the rest of the Palladium staff, with the "Wayne Smith's" tag added as a tribute to Wayne for his hard work on the series, in parody of the style of several movie titles.

Due to the financial crisis resulting from the embezzlement and theft from Palladium by an employee/minor stockholder, Issue #34 of The Rifter had an exceptionally small print run compared to other issues, and its print version is sought after by Palladium collectors. Issue #35 had an editorial discussing the incident, in addition to being a "Swimsuit Issue" with a selection of art by Palladium artists and friends, including drawings of some of the male staff.

== Publishing Frequency ==
While officially a quarterly publication, the actual printing and distribution dates were irregular, with other products being higher priority. This resulted in some issues being "late", with the next issue following only 1–2 months later, in order to maintain four issues per year. Often, the 4th issue of a year would be pushed into January of the next. A discounted subscription to a year's worth of The Rifter was usually offered during the first quarter of each year by Palladium.
