= Through the Glass Darkly =

Through the Glass Darkly may refer to:

- Through the Glass Darkly (film), a 2020 American thriller
- Through the Glass Darkly (Nightbane), a 1997 supplement to the role-playing game Nightbane
- "Through the Glass Darkly", a 2007 song by Annie Lennox from Songs of Mass Destruction

== See also ==
- Through a Glass Darkly (disambiguation)
