= Between the Shadows =

Role-playing game supplement

Between the Shadows is a supplement published by Palladium Books in 1996 for the horror fantasy role-playing game Nightbane .

== Contents ==
Between the Shadows is a 144-page softcover book that was written by Carlos Martijena-Carella and Kevin Siembieda. The contents present a number of settings for the Nightbane game, including

- Groom Lake, a base for the American Defense Agency
- the Dreamstream, the unconscious thoughts of all sentient beings
- Club Freak, a nightspot owned by the Earl of Hideous

There is also information about the Spook Squad (a secretive government agency).

== Reception ==
In the May 1996 edition of Arcane, Lucya Szachnowski was generally positive about this supplement, saying, ""Production quality is high, with some excellent artwork. There are plenty of conversion notes and crossover suggestions for using Nightbane with other Palladium systems, and it's well-suited for importing ideas from other horror games. Great stuff." Szachnowski concluded by giving the book an above average rating of 8 out of 10.

In the July 1996 edition of Dragon (Issue 231), Rick Swan thought this book was "an above average effort", but asked why, since there were 144 pages, there wasn't enough room for "a couple of full-blown adventures?"

== Reviews ==
- Australian Realms #29
