= Rifts Game Master Reference Screen =

Rifts Game Master Reference Screen is a 1996 role-playing game supplement published by Palladium Books for Rifts.

== Contents ==
Rifts Game Master Reference Screen is a supplement in which two gamemaster's screens are included—one general, one focused on magic and psionics—and a 64-page booklet. The screens contain key tables like random encounters and NPC generation. The accompanying booklet features two adventures, along with 17 shorter scenario ideas, and charts, forms, and character sheets.

== Reception ==
Andy Butcher reviewed Rifts Game Master Reference Screen for Arcane magazine, rating it a 4 out of 10 overall, and stated that "It’s probably not worth shelling out on this for the screens themselves, but referees running short on ideas for adventures will find a lot of inspiration here. Whether that’s worth the asking price is a debatable point, though."
