= Systems Failure =

Tabletop role-playing game

- Front cover of Systems Failure role-playing game rulebook, illustrated by John Zeleznik
- Designers: Bill Coffin
- Illustrators: Scott Johnson, Ramón Pérez, Michael Wilson
- Publishers: Palladium Books
- Publication: July 1999
- Years active: 1999–2004
- Genres: Post-apocalyptic science fiction
- Languages: English
- Systems: Megaversal
- Website: palladiumbooks.com

Systems Failure is a role-playing game written by Bill Coffin and published by Palladium Books in July 1999.

== Contents ==
The fictional premise for the game is that during the "Millennium bug" scare, actual "Bugs" appeared. They are energy beings from beyond Earth (whether another dimension or another planet is not clear) that invaded at the end of 1999, leaving a post-apocalyptic world in their wake. The Bugs feed on energy and are capable of transmitting themselves through modern power transmission and phone lines.

The Bugs come in several varieties. There are the drone-like Army Ants who have only basic intelligence, the more intelligent Assassin Bugs who can replicate human speech, though imperfectly, and the flying Lightning Bugs, amongst others. All of them are able to turn themselves into energy or rapidly call up reinforcements. In addition to these, there are "brain bugs", a variety that can invade human minds and turn them into zombie-like servants of the Bugs.

Players take the part of survivors of this invasion ten years after it occurred. Some groups, such as survival-oriented militias, were well-prepared for something to go wrong and so form the nuclei of stable societies and resistance to the Bugs. Military units have converged on NORAD which is using genetic engineering to create new weapons that the Bugs cannot gain control of, and to create super-soldiers, both those that have psionic powers and those who have been mutated into insect-like supermen using Bug DNA. In addition, there are people who have been driven mad by the stress, those who have joined gangs and seek to exploit others, and those who trade their skills as mechanics, medics, scientists, or merchants.

The gameplay utilizes the standard Palladium ruleset, the Megaversal system.

== Reviews ==
- Pyramid
