= John Zeleznik =

Role-playing game illustrator and designer

- Education: Otis College of Art and Design
- Occupations: Artist, illustrator
- Known for: Illustrations for Shadowrun, Rifts, GURPS, and Magic: The Gathering

John Zeleznik is an artist and illustrator.

== Career ==
Zeleznik has provided covers and illustrative work for many role-playing games including Shadowrun, Rifts (and other Palladium Books games), and GURPS. He graduated from the Otis/Parsons Institute of Art in Los Angeles with a BFA in Illustration. He works in acrylic paint on illustration board.

He illustrated the covers to several Shadowrun books, including DNA/DOA (1990), Queen Euphoria (1990), and Bottled Demon (1990).

Zeleznik is also the designer and artist for the science fiction/superhero Skraypers setting for Rifts and Heroes Unlimited.

Some of his RPG credits include Beyond the Supernatural, Systems Failure, Nightbane, and Macross II.

Zeleznik has illustrated cards for the Magic: The Gathering collectible card game.

Lightstrike: The Collected Illustrations of John Zeleznik was published by Cartouche Press, and he also illustrated a Rifts Coloring Book.

Zeleznik also designed all of the labels for the Leona Valley Winery.

He contributed illustrations to the 2007 Hollywood Zombies trading card series.
