= Rifts World Book 10: Juicer Uprising =

Tabletop role-playing game supplement

Rifts World Book 10: Juicer Uprising is a supplement published by Palladium Books in 1996 for the science fiction role-playing game Rifts. The book focusses on "Juicers", chemically enhanced warriors.

== Contents ==
Rifts World Book 10: Juicer Uprising is a supplement about Juicers, people who use drugs to give them enhanced superpowers at the cost of a markedly shorter lifespan. The book is divided into:

- Juicer history
- Juicer culture
- New Juicer classes
- New skills and weapons
- Organizations
- Places of interest
- The Juicer Uprising, an official advance in the Rifts campaign timeline

== Publication history ==
Palladium Books first published the science fiction role-playing game Rifts in 1990, and followed that with a series of supplements, including 36 books in the World Book series published between 1991 and 2018. The tenth in the series, published in 1996, was Juicer Uprising, a 160-page softcover book designed by C.J. Carella and Kevin Siembieda, with interior art by Wayne Breaux Jr., Vince Martin, and Randall K. Post, and cover art by John Zeleznik.

== Reception ==
In Issue 8 of Arcane, Lucya Szachnowski commented that "There is a lot of good stuff here for players and referees alike, and if you play Rifts, this is a must." She concluded by giving it an above-average rating of 8 out of 10 overall.

In the October 1996 edition of Dragon, Rick Swan called the book "an elaborate treatise on one of the Rifts game's most popular character classes." He concluded that the book "provides more Juicer info than a casual Rift-er like me will ever need. But I have to admit, I loved the sports section."
