= Rifts Sourcebook 2: The Mechanoids =

Rifts Sourcebook 2: The Mechanoids is a 1992 role-playing supplement for Rifts published by Palladium Books.

== Contents ==
Rifts Sourcebook 2: The Mechanoids is a supplement in which the alien cyborg Mechanoids are the focus.

== Publication history ==
Shannon Appelcline explained that with Rifts supplements, "Some books further crossed-over into old Palladium properties, such as Rifts Sourcebook 2: The Mechanoids (1992) - the third of Palladium's killer cyborgs".

== Reception ==
Charles Peirce reviewed Rifts Sourcebook Two: The Mechanoids in White Wolf #35 (March/April, 1993), rating it a 3 out of 5 and stated that "this book is worth having based on these pages alone, a very refreshing change in a Rifts product. Even if you disagree, the Mechanoids themselves, new character options (such as Mechanoid PCs), adventures and new character sheets should entice you."

== Reviews ==
- Dragon #194
