= Rifts Conversion Book =

Rifts Conversion Book is a 1991 role-playing supplement for Rifts published by Palladium Books.

== Contents ==
Rifts Conversion Book is a supplement in which new rules, magic, character classes and more are detailed.

== Publication history ==
Shannon Appelcline explained that in 1990 "Both games included colourful settings but Rifts had an advantage that Torg did not: it could mine all the old Palladium settings. The next year Palladium thus produced the Rifts Conversion Book (1991). Although all of Palladium's games used the same house system, they were not exactly the same, especially not with the MDC emphasis of later publications. Thus the Conversion Book explained how to use any of the existing Palladium games as part of the Rifts megaverse. Now you could bring your ninjas, your super-spies, your unlimited heroes and your fantasy characters to the world of Rifts."

== Reception ==
Charles Peirce reviewed Rifts Conversion Book in White Wolf #35 (March/April, 1993), rating it a 4 out of 5 and stated that "The Rifts Conversion Book is a very good resource for any Rifts Campaign. This book will probably be most enjoyable to those people who have not seen this information elsewhere, providing the most new ideas and information. Still, this book is a vital addition to the Rifts world and is a good investment."

== Reviews ==
- The Gamer (Issue 2 - Mar 1992)
