= Rifts World Book 6: South America =

Rifts World Book 6: South America is a 1994 role-playing supplement for Rifts published by Palladium Books.

== Contents ==
Rifts World Book 6: South America is a supplement in which a section of South America is explored with details about its nations and creatures, and its magics.

== Reception ==
Charles Peirce reviewed Rifts World Book 6: South America in White Wolf Inphobia #56 (June, 1995), rating it a 4 out of 5 and stated that "Rifts: South America is the best World Book yet. It manages to detail a variety of interesting places and people offering just enough variety to make South America a place of endless possibilities and just enough depth that you can take full advantage of those possibilities."

== Reviews ==
- Australian Realms #23
