= Rifts Mercenaries =

Role-playing game supplement

Rifts Mercenaries is a 1994 role-playing supplement for Rifts published by Palladium Books.

== Contents ==
Rifts Mercenaries is a supplement in which mercenaries are detailed, along with rules for creating mercenary companies.

== Reception ==
Charles Peirce reviewed Rifts Mercenaries in White Wolf Inphobia #55 (May, 1995), rating it a 3.5 out of 5 and stated that "Rifts Mercenaries is a good book, and it's sure to help many a campaign; with the variety of information that it provides, there's sure to be something for everyone. While suggestions for using the companies aren't very diverse or interesting, the companies themselves are appealing enough to serve as springboards for stories."

== Reviews ==
- Australian Realms #21
- The Familiar (Issue 5 - Aug 1995)
