= Rifts World Book 3: England =

1993 role-playing supplement for Rifts published by Palladium Books

Rifts World Book 3: England is a 1993 role-playing supplement for Rifts published by Palladium Books.

== Contents ==
Rifts World Book 3: England is a supplement in which world information is presented, along with new classes, weapons, monsters and magic.

== Reception ==
Charles Peirce reviewed Rifts World Book Three: England in White Wolf #37 (July/Aug., 1993), rating it a 3 out of 5 and stated that "All in all, Rifts World Book: England is a pleasant enough book. It doesn't contain anything truly magnificent, but very little of it is substandard. It is certainly a better buy than Atlantis was."

== Reviews ==
- Australian Realms #12
- Roleplayer Independent (Volume 1, Issue 7–Jun 1993)
