= Bill Coffin =

Game author and writer

- Born: William P. Coffin; September 17, 1970 (age 56); Easton, Pennsylvania, U.S.
- Education: B.A. English, cum laude
- Alma mater: Washington and Lee University
- Occupations: Author; editor; game designer; journalist
- Spouse: Allison B. Higgins
- Writing career
- Period: April 1995 – present
- Genres: Fantasy, science fiction
- Notable works: Heroes Unlimited: Century Station and Gramercy Island; Palladium Fantasy RPG regional adventure guides Rifts: Coalition Wars; Septimus; Systems Failure
- Notable awards: George A. Mahan Award for Creative Writing

Bill Coffin (born September 17, 1970) is a writer of novels and role-playing games in the fantasy and science fiction genres. Perhaps best known for his work at Palladium Books from July 1998 through May 2002, he made significant contributions to several of Palladium's game series, most notably Palladium Fantasy, but also Heroes Unlimited and Rifts, and created his own game, Systems Failure.

== Career ==
Bill Coffin is a well-received author who made many books for Palladium Books from 1988 through 2002. He was a contributor to both the Palladium Fantasy Role-Playing and Rifts role-playing games. In his post-apocalyptic role-playing game Systems Failure (1999), Y2K really happened. However, due to a conflict with Kevin Siembieda, the president and co-founder of Palladium Books, Coffin left the company, much to the disappointment of his fans. Siembieda wound up firing Coffin over editorial differences and discontent against the Rifts Coalition Wars (which the two had co-authored). At the time of his departure, Coffin was the lead author of six titles in the final stages of production. He was subsequently demoted to second- and third-author status on two of these books prior to their release, and the other four were ultimately shelved and have not been rescheduled for publication. In addition, having only received limited support from Palladium, Systems Failure has since gone out of print.

In March 2007, it was revealed that Coffin was working on Septimus, a new campaign setting for the D6 Space core book for West End Games. However, due to financial concerns, the publisher cancelled the project in March 2008. Shortly thereafter, Coffin declared that he would release the game as a PDF under Evil Hat Productions' FATE system. In May 2009, West End Games announced that they had agreed to publish Septimus again and that it would be released August 2009. Eric Gibson released Bill Coffin's Septimus in 2009 as a PDF, which became the last product released by West End Games.

== Bibliography ==
=== Palladium Books ===
==== Heroes Unlimited ====
- Siembieda, K. & Breaux, W. Jr. (June 1999). Heroes Unlimited G.M.'s Guide. Taylor, MI: Palladium Books. ISBN 978-1-57457-035-9. – Editor.
- Coffin, B. & Siembieda, K. (February 2000). Century Station: An Adventure Sourcebook for Heroes Unlimited, Second Edition (HU2E). Palladium Books, Incorporated. ISBN 978-1-57457-040-3.
- Coffin, B. & Siembieda, K. (November 2000). Gramercy Island: An Adventure Sourcebook for HU2E. Palladium Books, Incorporated. ISBN 978-1-57457-055-7.
- Breaux, W. Jr.; Siembieda, K. & Coffin, B. (May 2001). The Aliens Unlimited Galaxy Guide: A HU2E Sourcebook. Palladium Books, Incorporated. ISBN 978-1-57457-054-0. – Additional text and concepts.

==== Palladium Fantasy Role-Playing Game ====
- Coffin, B. & Siembieda, K. (September 1998). Palladium Fantasy Role-Playing Game, Second Edition (PFRPG) Book 8: The Western Empire. Palladium Books, Incorporated. ISBN 978-1-57457-015-1. – Lead author, maps.
- Coffin, B. & Siembieda, K. (March 1999). PFRPG Book 9: The Baalgor Wastelands. Palladium Books, Incorporated. ISBN 978-1-57457-022-9. – Lead author, maps.
- Coffin, B. & Siembieda, K. (May 1999). PFRPG Book 10: Mount Nimro—Kingdom of Giants. Palladium Books, Incorporated. ISBN 978-1-57457-028-1. – Lead author, maps.
- Coffin, B. & Siembieda, K. (July 2000). PFRPG Book 12: Library of Bletherad. Palladium Books, Incorporated. ISBN 978-1-57457-047-2. – Lead author, maps.
- Coffin, B. & Siembieda, K. (June 2001). PFRPG Book 13: Northern Hinterlands. Palladium Books, Incorporated. ISBN 978-1-57457-058-8. – Coauthor, maps.
- Coffin, B. & Siembieda, K. (December 2001). PFRPG—Land of the Damned One: Chaos Lands. Palladium Books, Incorporated. ISBN 978-1-57457-059-5. – Lead author, maps.
- Siembieda, K. & Coffin, B. (June 2002). PFRPG—Land of the Damned Two: Eternal Torment. Palladium Books. ISBN 978-1-57457-061-8. – Coauthor.
- Wujcik, E.; Siembieda, K.; Coffin, B.; et al. (February 2003). Wolfen Empire Adventure Sourcebook. Palladium Books. ISBN 978-1-57457-063-2.

==== Rifts ====
- Siembieda, K.; Breaux, W. Jr. & Coffin, B. (November 1999). Rifts World Book 23: Xiticix Invasion. Palladium Books, Incorporated. ISBN 978-1-57457-031-1. – Additional text and concepts.
- Siembieda, K.; DesRochers, F. & Coffin, B. (April 2000). Rifts World Book 22: Free Quebec. Palladium Books, Incorporated. ISBN 978-1-57457-030-4. – Additional text and concepts.
- Siembieda, K. & Coffin, B. (June 2000). Rifts Coalition Wars: Siege on Tolkeen (RCW)—Chapter One: Sedition. Palladium Books, Incorporated. ISBN 978-1-57457-045-8. – Additional text and ideas.
- Siembieda, K. & Coffin, B. (August 2000). RCW Chapter Two: Coalition Overkill. Palladium Books, Incorporated. ISBN 978-1-57457-046-5. – Coauthor.
- Siembieda, K. & Coffin, B. (October 2000). RCW Chapter Three: Sorcerers' Revenge. Palladium Books, Incorporated. ISBN 978-1-57457-050-2. – Additional text and ideas.
- Siembieda, K. & Coffin, B. (December 2000). RCW Chapter Four: Cyber-Knights. Palladium Books, Incorporated. ISBN 978-1-57457-051-9. – Additional text and ideas.
- Siembieda, K. & Coffin, B. (August 2001). RCW Chapter Six: Final Siege. Palladium Books, Incorporated. ISBN 978-1-57457-053-3. – Additional text and ideas.
- Siembieda, K.; Coffin, B.; Breaux, W. Jr.; et al. (September 2001). Coffin, B. & Siembieda, K (eds.). Rifts Game Master Guide. Palladium Books, Incorporated. ISBN 978-1-57457-067-0. – Compiling, additional text and ideas, selected material.
- Siembieda, K.; Breaux, W. Jr.; King, H.; et al. (October 2001). Coffin, B (ed.). Rifts Book of Magic. Palladium Books, Incorporated. ISBN 978-1-57457-069-4. – Compiling.
- Siembieda, K.; Coffin, B.; Wujcik, E.; et al. (February 2002). Rifts Adventure Guide. Palladium Books, Incorporated. ISBN 978-1-57457-072-4. – Additional text and "words of wisdom".
- Siembieda, K. & Coffin, B. (April 2002). Rifts Aftermath, 109 P.A.: Life After Tolkeen and a World Overview. Palladium Books, Incorporated. ISBN 978-1-57457-068-7. – Some compilation and additional text, selected material.
- Coffin, B. & Siembieda, K. (May 2002). Rifts Dimension Book Five: The Anvil Galaxy—A Phase World Sourcebook. Palladium Books, Incorporated. ISBN 978-1-57457-019-9.
- Siembieda, K.; Marciniszyn, A.; Rosenstein, J.; et al. (September 2002). Rifts Bionics Sourcebook. Palladium Books, Incorporated. ISBN 978-1-57457-075-5. – Additional text and ideas.
- Siembieda, K.; Carella, C. J.; Coffin, B.; et al. (December 2002). Rifts Dark Conversions. Palladium Books, Incorporated. ISBN 978-1-57457-079-3. – Additional text and ideas.

==== Systems Failure ====
- Coffin, B. & Siembieda, K. (July 1999). Systems Failure: A Complete Role-Playing Game. Palladium Books, Incorporated. ISBN 978-1-57457-038-0. [Out of Print] – Lead author, maps.

==== The Rifter ====
- Coffin, B. (October 1998). Smith, W (ed.). "Palladium Fantasy Role-Playing Game: Hook, Line & Sinkers for The Western Empire". The Rifter: Sourcebook and Guide to the Palladium Megaverse (4): 12–20. ISBN 978-1-57457-014-4. [Out of Print]
- Coffin, B. (October 1998). Smith, W (ed.). "Long, Strange Trips: Writing Epic Campaigns for Palladium Fantasy". The Rifter (4): 23–33. ISBN 978-1-57457-014-4. [Out of Print]
- Coffin, B. (October 1999). Smith, W (ed.). "Systems Failure Adventure: The Guns of Sulfur Gulch". The Rifter (8): 12–27. ISBN 978-1-57457-036-6. [Out of Print]
- Coffin, B. (April 2000). Smith, W (ed.). "Giga-Damage: The Next BIG Thing from Palladium". The Rifter: Y2K April Fool's Spectacular (9–1/2): 10–17. ISBN 978-1-57457-042-7. [Out of Print] – Authored as "Peter Ferkelberger".
- Coffin, B. (October 2001). Smith, W (ed.). "Siege on Tolkeen: Official "Optional" Hook, Line & Sinker Adventures". The Rifter (16): 82–90. ISBN 978-1-57457-057-1. [Out of Print]

=== West End Games ===
- Coffin, B. (August 2009). Septimus. Downingtown, PA: West End Games. ISBN 978-1-932867-18-3.

=== Novels ===
- Coffin, B. (April 1995). Overmind. Unionville, NY: Royal Fireworks Press. ISBN 978-0-88092-141-1.
- Coffin, B. (January 1996). Prime Mover. Unionville, NY: Royal Fireworks Press. ISBN 978-0-88092-349-1.
- Coffin, B. (August 2009). The Dark Britannia Saga, Volume I: Pax Morgana. Atlanta, GA: Reliquary Press. ISBN 978-0-9841833-0-2.
- Coffin, B. (July 2011). The Dark Britannia Saga, Volume II: Pax Arcadia. Atlanta, GA: Reliquary Press. ISBN 978-0-9841833-8-8.
- Coffin, B. (November 2013). The Dark Britannia Saga, Volume III: Pax Britannia. Atlanta, GA: Reliquary Press. ISBN 978-1-9365192-2-4.
