= Rifts World Book 2: Atlantis =

Rifts World Book 2: Atlantis is a 1992 role-playing supplement for Rifts published by Palladium Books.

== Contents ==
Rifts World Book 2: Atlantis is a supplement in which the Splugorth are detailed.

== Reception ==
Charles Peirce reviewed Rifts World Book Two: Atlantis in White Wolf #35 (March/April, 1993), rating it a 2 out of 5 and stated that "Whether or not you like Atlantis will depend on what you want. If you feel the need to populate the Rifts world with yet more monsters, magic and weaponry, then definitely purchase this book. If not, definitely pass on this one."

== Reviews ==
- Dragon #197
- Australian Realms #9
- The Last Province (Issue 2 - Dec 1992)
