= Splicer =

Splicer may refer to:

- Splicer (BioShock), characters in the BioShock video game series
- Characters in Splicers
- Film splicer
- Splicer (Band), a german Rock-Band
