= Robotech II: The Sentinels (Palladium Books) =

Science fiction role-playing game

Robotech II: The Role-Playing Game
- Cover art by Kevin Long
- Designers: Kevin Siembieda
- Illustrators: Kevin Long, Thomas J. Gould, Kevin Siembieda, Tatsunoko Production
- Publishers: Palladium Books
- Years active: September 1987 – August 1995
- Genres: Science fiction
- Languages: English
- Systems: Megaversal
- Website: palladiumbooks.com

Robotech II: The Sentinels is a 1987 role-playing game published by Palladium Books in 1987 that is similar in tone and content to Palladium's previously published Robotech.

== Contents ==
Robotech II: The Sentinels is a stand-alone role-playing game that uses the rules from the Palladium Role-Playing Game. The game uses a campaign setting that takes place in the Robotech universe but the adventures take the players to new places. As a guide for players, the book presents information on character statistics, new technology, random encounters, two short scenarios, and combat data for soldiers.

The complex combat rules have been characterized as "excruciatingly detailed."

== Publication history ==
Robotech II: The Sentinels was written by Kevin Siembieda and was published by Palladium Books in 1987 as a 144-page book with cover art by Kevin Long, and interior art by Long, Thomas J. Gould, Kevin Siembieda, and Tatsunoko Production.

== Reception ==
In the June 1989 edition of Games International (Issue 6), Jake Thornton was not pleased with the production values of the book, noting that it was a "flimsy softback with a curled-up cover." He also noted that to properly understand the RPG and its rules, the player would need the first volume in this series of books. What rules there were in this volume he found ambiguous and lacking in cohesion. Thornton concluded by giving this book a very poor rating of only 1 out of 5.

In his 1990 book The Complete Guide to Role-Playing Games, game critic Rick Swan compared this game to its predecessor, Robotech, and found "With its expanded skill lists, extensive background material, and brief but adequate introductory scenarios, Sentinels emphasizes role-playing more than Robotech and is therefore a more interesting game." Swan concluded by giving this game a solid rating of 3 out of 4, saying, "It's not for newcomers — players who have never heard of Macross, Mecha, or other elements of the Robotech universe won't have a clue what this is all about — but fans of the Japanese cartoons will find plenty to enjoy."
