= Rifts Dimension Book 1: Wormwood =

Role-play supplement

Rifts Dimension Book 1: Wormwood is a 1993 role-playing supplement for Rifts published by Palladium Books.

== Contents ==
Rifts Dimension Book 1: Wormwood is a supplement in which a living planet is threatened by invading demons.

== Publication history ==
It was published in the Summer, and alluded to in the April 1993 world book for England (the third in the series).

In-book lore-wise Erin Tarn wrote her "return" letter in England in May 103PA after getting back from Wormwood, but didn't compile her Wormwood writings until "Wormwood, a Distant World" in December 103PA

Rifts Dimension Book 1: Wormwood was the first release as part of a new line of Rifts supplements about different dimensions and worlds. Shannon Appelcline explained that for Palladium with Rifts, "their success was not just financial. Some of the Rifts books were also critically acclaimed for the vibrant backgrounds, such as Rifts Dimension Book 1: Wormwood (1993), a dark fantasy realm co-authored by comic author and artists Tim Truman and Flint Henry."

== Reception ==
Charles Peirce reviewed Rifts Dimension Book One: Wormwood in White Wolf #44 (June, 1994), rating it a 4 out of 5 and stated that "This really is a good product, offering a well-developed and unique world for adventure. With all that it introduces (new classes, magic, monsters and setting), this one should liven up any Rifts campaign, or serve as a good alternative world to play in."

== Reviews ==
- Dragon #205
- Australian Realms #17
