= Promise of Power =

Promise of Power may stand for:

- Rifts: Promise of Power game
- A sorcery card from Magic: The Gathering
