= VOTP =

VOTP may refer to:

- Tirupati Airport's ICAO code
- Valley of the Pharaohs role-playing game
- The Voice of the People, a collection of folk songs
- VOTP Records, a record label founded by Billy Jenkins
- Violent Offenders Treatment Program, a psychological program used in prisons and secure psychiatric hospitals*

== See also ==
- Voice of the people (disambiguation)
