= Through the Glass Darkly (Nightbane) =

1997 role-playing game supplement

Through the Glass Darkly is a 1997 role-playing game supplement published by Palladium Books for Nightbane.

== Contents ==
Through the Glass Darkly is a supplement in which the metaphysics of magic within the game's universe is explored, and mirror magic and the Mirrorwall—the dimensional barrier—play a minor role. The supplement introduces The Shadowleague, a mystical astral network akin to the internet for spellcasters, alongside factions of magicians and legendary magical sites and artifacts. It also features a host of new spells and concludes with several globe-spanning scenarios. The book also includes many plot hooks.

== Reception ==
Lucya Szachnowski reviewed Through the Glass Darkly for Arcane magazine, rating it an 8 out of 10 overall, and stated that "If you enjoy unnerving your players by introducing unpleasant plot twists and evil new ideas into your horror games then you will love this superb addition to the Nightbane system. As with Nightbane Worldbook 1, a lot of its material could be very effectively imported into other horror RPGs. This is a book I would strongly recommend to any horror game aficionado."
