= Bottled Demon =

Bottled Demon is a 1990 role-playing game adventure for Shadowrun published by FASA.

== Plot summary ==
Bottled Demon is an adventure in which the player characters are hired in a bar.

== Publication history ==
Bottled Demon was written by James D. Long, with a cover by John Zeleznik, and was published by FASA Corp. in 1990 as a 64-page book.

== Reception ==
Games International magazine reviewed Bottled Demon and stated that "Bottled Demon is an object-oriented adventure for Shadowrunners that will get paranoid players asking the age-old question: why us?"
