= Queen Euphoria =

Queen Euphoria is a 1990 role-playing game adventure published by FASA for Shadowrun.

== Plot summary ==
Queen Euphoria is an adventure in which the player characters are hired by a competitor to stop someone in town from adding an addictive substance to a popular junk food. Their mission leads them into a conflict involving South American insect spirits.

== Publication history ==
Queen Euphoria was written by Stephan Wieck with a cover by John Zeleznik and published by FASA in 1990 as a 72-page book.

== Reviews ==
- GamesMaster International (Issue 4 - Nov 1990)
