= Rifts: Promise of Power =

2005 video game

- Developer: Backbone Entertainment
- Publisher: Nokia
- Composer: Chris Rezanson
- Platform: N-Gage
- Release: EU: October 27, 2005; NA: November 28, 2005
- Genre: Tactical role-playing
- Modes: Single-player, multiplayer

Rifts: Promise of Power is a 2005 video game licensed for the Rifts role-playing game (RPG) from Palladium Books. It was released for the N-Gage in 2005. The basic mechanics of the game are adapted from the pen-and-paper version, utilizing an action point turn-based system.

In 2025, Palladium Books announced plans to crowdfund the re-release of the game on PC.

== Gameplay ==
There are three character classes available in Promise of Power. There are three proto-classes from which players can select at the outset of the game: Mercenary, Psionic, and Magic User. Upon reaching fourth level, players may choose a specialization such as Borg, Burster, or Ley Line Walker, some of which are restricted based on proto-class. One character class specially designed for the game – the Elemental Fusionist – was adapted into the Rifts Ultimate Edition core rulebook.

The game covers five different locations on Rifts Earth from the sourcebooks. Promise of Power is set on Rifts Earth, a post-apocalyptic world a few hundred years in the future. It features advanced technology, magic and psionic powers, alien and monstrous beings from other dimensions, mutants, and vampires.

== Development ==
Shane Neville loved the Rifts adventure book as a high school and university student, and began to envision a game based on them once he entered the video-game business; when he joined Nokia's fledgling Richmond studio in 2003 and saw that Rifts was one of the company's options, Neville met with Kevin Siembieda to collaborate on the game. Siembieda refused all video game licensing requests for the game for 14 years, but finally agreed to license Rifts to Nokia. Nokia announced a dedicated Rifts Promise of Power mini-site, which went live on April 2, 2005 for the upcoming Rifts role-playing on the N-Gage.

== Reception ==
Reception

Aggregate score
Aggregator	Score
Metacritic	75/100

Review scores
Publication	Score
GameDaily	3.5/5
GameSpy	4/5
Jeuxvideo.com	9/20

The game received "generally favorable reviews" according to the review aggregation website Metacritic.
