= Dead Reign =

Tabletop role-playing game

The Zombie Apocalypse
- Front cover of Dead Reign core rulebook, illustrated by E. M. Gist
- Designers: Josh Hilden, Joshua Sanford, Kevin Siembieda
- Illustrators: Amy L. Ashbaugh, Nick Bradshaw, Kent Burles, Mark Dudley, Mike Mumah
- Publishers: Palladium Books
- Publication: November 2008
- Years active: 2008–present
- Genres: Post-apocalyptic horror
- Languages: English
- Systems: Megaversal
- Website: palladiumbooks.com

Dead Reign is a zombie apocalypse role-playing game published by Palladium Books. The first print of the main book was in November 2008.

== Publication history ==
Dead Reign is a zombie apocalypse game from Palladium Books, and rated as an "SDC" game on the company's Megaversal system, putting it at a more-human power level than most games from Palladium. Two supplements for Dead Reign were published in 2008, and according to Shannon Appelcline the game "generally showed that Palladium was doing more than just surviving in the years following the Crisis [of Treachery]; it was also continuing to innovate settings".

== Sourcebooks ==
1. Civilization Gone (first printing May 2009)
2. Dark Places (first printing before 7 October 2011)
3. Endless Dead (first printing May 2012)
4. Fear the Reaper (first printing before 25 December 2013)
5. Graveyard Earth (first printing November 2014)
6. Hell Followed (first printing December 2016)
7. In the Face of Death (first printing June 2020)

== Reviews ==
- Rue Morgue #88
