= Rifts World Book 5: Triax and The NGR =

Roleplaying game supplement

Rifts World Book 5: Triax and The NGR is a 1994 role-playing supplement for Rifts published by Palladium Books.

== Contents ==
Rifts World Book 5: Triax and The NGR is a supplement in which both the weapons manufacturer Triax and the New German Republic are detailed.

== Reception ==
Charles Peirce reviewed Triax and The NGR in White Wolf #48 (Oct., 1994), rating it a 3 out of 5 and stated that "If you need lots of equipment, this is a good buy. The new classes aren't spectacular, and most of the gargoyle information can be extrapolated from other sources."

== Reviews ==
- Australian Realms #18
