= Nightbane =

Tabletop role-playing game and campaign setting

- Core rulebook, illustrated by Gerald Brom
- Designers: C. J. Carella, Kevin Siembieda, Irvin Jackson, Kevin Hassall, Mark Oberle, Jason Vey
- Illustrators: Wayne Breaux, Jr., Gerald Brom, Kent Burles, Fred Fields, Scott Johnson, Vince Martin, Martin McKenna, Ramón Pérez, Roger Peterson, Randy Post, John Zeleznik, et al.
- Publishers: Palladium Books
- Publication: August 1995
- Years active: 1995–present
- Genres: Dark fantasy, horror, superhero
- Languages: English
- Systems: Megaversal
- Website: palladiumbooks.com

Nightbane is a dark fantasy role-playing game and setting created by C. J. Carella and published by Palladium Books.

== Description ==
The game was originally published as a 240-page softcover book in 1995, designed by Carlos J. Martijena-Carella with Kevin Siembieda. Interior art was by Vince Martin, Randy Post, Scott Johnson, and Roger Peterson, with cover art by Gerald Brom. Originally published under the title Nightspawn, the game's name was changed to Nightbane after legal threats from the lawyers of Todd McFarlane, creator of the Spawn comic book.

The world of Nightbane is a modern dark urban fantasy in which a secret cabal of supernatural beings from another dimension called the Nightlords and their shapeshifting minions have quietly seized control of the world's governments and corporate powers. The only beings standing in their way are the beings known as Nightbanes created by the players. The game uses Palladium's Megaversal system, which is also used by the multi-genre game Rifts and the horror game Beyond the Supernatural, among others.

Some critics have noted strong similarities between Nightbane and the works of horror author Clive Barker, particularly the novella Cabal (1988) and its film adaptation Nightbreed (1990).

After it had been out of print for some years, the property was revived by Palladium in 2009 with the release of the Nightbane Survival Guide written by Irvin Jackson and Mark Oberle.

== Setting ==
On March 6, 2000, at 6:02 am, the world was shrouded in unnatural darkness caused by an extra dimensional race of demonic beings known as the Nightlords. Thousands of people suddenly transformed into monsters, but when the darkness left, they returned to human form. These shape-changers, called the Nightbane, have the ability to change to their monstrous form.

Players create and play Nightbanes, Guardians or even Vampires in order to battle the Nightlords and hopefully defeat them. Characters take on normal human form (called "The Facade") until they want to transform into their horrific monstrous form. The Nightbanes are organized into various underground factions all battling the Nightlords in their own way.

== Gameplay ==
=== Character creation ===
Players roll dice to create eight basic attributes. Using formulas, bonuses from these attributes are used to modify skills and engage in combat. For the monstrous shape or morphus, players are able to design the monster by random rolling from different tables or by selection from said tables. Players are able to make their horrific alternate form by combining animal features, alien physiology, machine parts, and other oddities. Players add everyday skills, supernatural powers, and a variety of weapons and other equipment to round out their characters.

=== Magic ===
The magic system is adapted from Beyond the Supernatural, and includes more than 130 spells.

=== Psychic abilities ===
Characters use Inner Strength Points to invoke powers such as levitation and telepathy.

=== Changing ===
When a character is in its Facade (human) phase, it can shape-shift to its monstrous phase in a single 15-second round or quicker by making a roll to speed the event along with the risk of ending up being temporarily caught between forms.

== Reception ==
In the March 1996 edition of Dragon (Issue 227), Rick Swan found the rules system of the original edition "dense" and "stodgy", calling the combat rules "a series of math problems based on Structural Damage Capacity (S.D.C.) and a host of modifiers" and "a pain in the neck." However, Swan loved the morphus creation rules, which allowed him to design "a bat-winged humanoid toad whose skin was covered with razor blades." A disappointment to Swan was that "the book doesn't provide much in the way of adventures." He concluded by giving the game an average rating of 4 out of 6, saying, "Richly imagined, exorbitantly detailed, Nightspawn [Nightbane] is like a splatter film designed by philosophy majors; its a cheesy, brainy delight."

== Reviews ==
- Shadis #24 (Feb., 1996)
- Casus Belli #89
- Australian Realms #27

== Sourcebooks ==
1. Nightbane World Book One Between the Shadows, first printing 1996, second printing August 1998
2. Nightbane World Book Two: Nightlands, first printing 1996, second printing October 1999
3. Nightbane World Book Three: Through the Glass Darkly, first printing March 1997
4. Nightbane World Book 4: Shadows of Light, first printing April 2003
5. Nightbane Survival Guide, first printing July 2009
6. Nightbane Dark Designs, first printing 2017
