= Rifts Sourcebook =

Rifts Sourcebook is a 1991 role-playing supplement for Rifts published by Palladium Books.

== Contents ==
Rifts Sourcebook is a supplement in which frequently asked questions are addressed in the beginning, which also details elements omitted from the first book. It then describes North America, focusing on areas controlled by the Coalition, including population figures, town and city explanations, and animal distribution. The book explores the Coalition's philosophy, offering tips for using them as villains or heroes, and provides detailed descriptions of the Coalition's rulers and their world domination plans. It also introduces Coalition-sponsored agents, new vehicles, and robots. Next, the book covers Triax industries, new powered armor, and various robots, along with equipment and repair notes. The adventure section focuses on a plotline involving robots and saving the world. The book also includes rules for creating robot player characters, adapted from Heroes Unlimited, allowing players to buy desired abilities. The final section features ten creatures from the Rifts world and a comprehensive character sheet.

== Publication history ==
Rifts Sourcebook was the first supplement published for Rifts, and is 120 pages.

== Reception ==
Charles Peirce reviewed Rifts Sourcebook in White Wolf #27 (June/July, 1991), rating it a 3 out of 5 and stated that "The Rifts Sourcebook is a well-written supplement that expands upon what was found the Rifts game. If you play Rifts, you should own this book."

== Reviews ==
- Challenge #50 (May/June, 1991)
