= Rifts Chaos Earth =

Role-playing game

- Front cover of Rifts Chaos Earth core rulebook, illustrated by Scott Johnson
- Designers: Kevin Siembieda
- Illustrators: Wayne Breaux, Jr., Michael Dubisch, Apollo Okamura, Ramón Pérez, Freddie E. Williams II, Michael Wilson
- Publishers: Palladium Books
- Publication: June 2003
- Years active: 2003–present
- Genres: Post-apocalyptic
- Languages: English
- Systems: Megaversal
- Website: palladiumbooks.com

Rifts Chaos Earth is a post-apocalyptic role-playing game from Palladium Books. It is a spinoff and prequel to their popular game Rifts, which uses a similar form of Palladium's Megaversal system.

== History ==
In the early 2000s, Palladium was experiencing decreasing sales, so the company continued to produce new settings in an attempt to offset this. As a result, Rifts Chaos Earth (2003), a prequel to Rifts, was released and supplemented that same year by a few sourcebooks.

== Description ==
Chaos Earth was initially intended to be parallel dimension to Rifts where the massive deaths were caused a minute after midnight when the released Potential Psychic Energy (P.P.E.) from the deaths caused by a limited nuclear exchange was not magnified. Everything that happened in Rifts happened on a smaller scale in Chaos Earth. Most of humanity survives with their technology and power base but have to fend off the onslaught of supernatural. This game style can be played in Palladium's Nightbane series.

Sometime after its original press description in an early Rifter, the game changed from a parallel dimension to Rifts history, perhaps due to the level of interest in Rifts' past. But may also be due to the developer's realization that supernatural creatures and magic in Rifts are Mega-Damage (MD) because of the high amounts of ambient PPE, which would not occur in the original concept of Chaos Earth while the tech would remain MD. Making the game a seriously unbalanced hack and slash on the side of tech.

The Chaos Earth setting is the period in Rifts history where the deaths caused by a limited nuclear exchange happened at midnight, in proximity to the winter solstice, in conjunction with a celestial alignment; which magnified the PPE released from the deaths sending all the ley lines into overdrive. Nexus, formed where leylines cross surge creating Rifts, large tears in the fabric of reality. This first wave was enough energy to bring Atlantis back creating tidal waves, earthquakes and even super volcano eruptions killing more people, further increasing ambient PPE. The rifts are two way gateways and allow all kinds of monsters to enter our world. In some locations entire new ecosystems are portaled in. In the end very little of humanity remains and it takes centuries to get to the world depicted in Rifts where the highest tech civilizations still use Golden Age tech that they found.

Chaos Earth is a setting more similar to the real world than the world of Rifts. Monsters are only starting to appear and there the forces of humanity are still trying to hold on to the civilized world that Earth had been, as opposed to Rifts where characters live in a world where violence and horror have been commonplace for centuries.

== Sourcebooks and mission books ==
- Sourcebook One: Creatures of Chaos, first printing September 2003
- Sourcebook Two: Rise of Magic, first printing November 2003
- Resurrection was released in 2015

== Reviews ==
- Backstab #45
