= Rifts World Book 1: Vampire Kingdoms =

1991 role-playing game supplement

- Publisher: Palladium Books
- Publication date: 1991
- ISBN: 9780916211523

Rifts World Book 1: Vampire Kingdoms is a 1991 role-playing supplement for Rifts published by Palladium Books.

== Contents ==
Rifts World Book 1: Vampire Kingdoms is a supplement in which vampires and their attributes are described. The book details the parts of Central America that survived.

== Reception ==
Charles Peirce reviewed Vampire Kingdoms in White Wolf #30 (Feb., 1992), rating it a 4 out of 5 and stated that "Vampire Kingdoms is an excellent sourcebook for any Rifts campaign. The information detailed is well-written and interior artwork by Kevin Long, Timothy Truman, Michael Gustovich and Kevin Siembieda is wonderful."

== Reviews ==
- Challenge #54
- Windgeflüster (Issue 20 - Nov 1992)
- Dragon #181
- Amiga Fun #12
