= Rifts World Book Nine: South America 2 =

Tabletop role-playing game supplement

Rifts World Book Nine: South America 2 is a 1995 role-playing game supplement for Rifts published by Palladium Books.

== Contents ==
Rifts: South America 2 is a supplement which explores various South American regions and the factions that operate there.

== Reception ==
Lucya Szachnowski reviewed Rifts: South America 2 for Arcane magazine, rating it a 6 out of 10 overall. Szachnowski comments that "New material - such as Nazcan line magic - is highly useable and straightforward. If you are used to Rifts or other Palladium systems, you shouldn't have much trouble with this. However, this isn't a book to buy as your first Rifts supplement because it constantly refers to other Palladium games."

== Reviews ==
- Dragon #229 (May, 1996)
