= The Valley of the Pharaohs =

Fantasy role-playing game

Role Playing Adventure in Ancient Egypt
- Cover art by Kevin Siembieda
- Designers: Matthew Balent
- Illustrators: Kevin Siembieda, Mary Walsh
- Publishers: Palladium Books
- Publication: September 1983
- Years active: 1983–1985
- Genres: Historical fantasy
- Languages: English

The Valley of the Pharaohs is a role-playing game published by Palladium Books in 1983 that is set in Ancient Egypt. Several reviewers found the historical material was valuable, but that there was not enough information about how role-playing could connect with the historical background in a meaningful way.

== Description ==
The Valley of the Pharaohs is a role-playing game in which players take on the roles of members of Egyptian society in the New Kingdom in 1450 BCE during the Eighteenth Dynasty.

To create a character, a player first randomly determines the character's caste, which will be either Nobility, Clergy, Bureaucrat or Commoner, and then their occupation — Soldier, Priest, Scholar, Merchant, or Thief. The character's occupation defines how many skills they possess.

Twenty pages of the illustrated rulebook are dedicated to historical background. Illustrations show various styles of Egyptian dress, as well as diagrams of boats, weapons, houses, fortifications, the Giza Necropolis, a Step Pyramid, the Temple of Hatshepsut, the Temple at Karnak, and a True Pyramid.

== Publication history ==
The Valley of the Pharaohs was written by Matthew Balent and illustrated by Kevin Siembieda and Mary Walsh. Palladium released it in 1983 as a boxed set containing a 50-page rulebook, a color map of Ancient Egypt, and thirteen loose sheets of illustrations and diagrams.

== Reception ==
In Issue 45 of Different Worlds (March–April 1987), Jonathan Tweet found the brief rules "leave too much up the gamemaster, even to the point of providing few viable ideas for adventures or an engaging campaign." Although Tweet liked "The attribute, skill, and combat rules [which] are simple and as realistic as they need to be," he found that "The magic rules, however, suffer from the game's brevity. All characters learn the same magic system regardless of religious affiliation, and the rules lack means by which to limit the creation of magical items. Also, no attempt is made to explore how magic, the only non-historical part of the game, might affect the civilization." Tweet pointed out that the research on Egyptian life and culture could have been even more valuable had the author included "rules and suggestions for incorporating the historical background into the play of the game, background that now has little direct representation in the rules." Tweet also found "The biggest obstacle to running a Valley of the Pharaohs campaign is the lack of motives for adventuring. The rules sanely remind gamemasters that armed adventurers freelancing as monster exterminators do not belong in 'the civilized, orderly land of Egypt' but do not offer alternatives to the kinds of adventures players usually enjoy." Tweet concluded by giving the game a very poor rating of only 1.5 out of 4, saying, "If the game was designed so that the scholar, merchant, and soldier characters could have exciting adventures in a civilized country like Egypt using all the noncombat skills described, Valley of the Pharaohs would have been given a better rating, but the game left me with no excitement as to the possibilities for scenarios."

In his 1990 book The Complete Guide to Role-Playing Games, game critic Rick Swan called this "an unattractive, underdeveloped effort that barely qualifies as a nice try." Swan found the character creation system unsatisfying, "producing characters that are colorless ... unbalanced ... and puzzling." Swan also found the game systems to be "woefully inadequate for a game with such lofty ambitions." However, Swan felt the game's worst fault was its failure to exploit the setting of Ancient Egypt, writing, "There's not a clue as to how it should be organized into a cohesive adventure. ... With minor exceptions, Valley of the Pharaohs could be describing a medieval fantasy world or, for that matter, any ancient era with a little magic tossed in." Swan concluded by giving the game a very poor rating of only 1.5.
