= Psionics (role-playing games) =

Aspect of role-playing gaming

Psionics, in tabletop role-playing games, is a broad category of fantastic abilities originating from the mind, similar to the psychic abilities that some people claim in reality.

== Common features ==
Psionics are primarily distinguished, in most popular gaming systems, by one or more of the following:

- Magical or super/meta human-like abilities including:
  - Extrasensory perception – learn secrets long forgotten, to glimpse the immediate future and predict the far future, to find hidden objects, and to know what is normally unknowable. Examples: Clairsentience, scrying, precognitives, retrocognitives, transduction, remote viewing, psychometry, omniscience, intuitiveness, aura reading, dowsing.
  - Manifest manipulation – Powers that create objects, creatures, or some form of matter. Examples: Metacreativity, automatic writing, transmutation, apportation, multiplication, heighten senses, mediumship, energy healing.
  - Intellect manipulation – Exclusive or near-exclusive association with highly advanced Intelligence quotients, disciplined, and/or willful beings well over the "superhuman intuitive genius" level; can choreograph entire wars with ease, comprehend and alter any science instantaneously, decipher any language, analyze and copy any fighting style, construct complex devices and inventions, compute mathematics at a superhuman level and have an eidetic memory. Amplify brain waves of others to enhance their intelligence, and thinking speed; they can also use their power to boost others power by advancing the power portion of their brain. Examples: Metapsionics, intellpsionic, synapsionic, psionic mimicry, psi-absorption, psi-augmentation, psi-bestowal, psi-negation, psi-sensing
  - Physics manipulation – Manipulate energy or tap the power of the mind to produce a desired end; Mind over matter projecting pure force via the mind; Other (non-force) "Energy"-based abilities. Examples: Psychokinesis, hyperkinesis, pyrokinesis, electrokinesis, cryokinesis, hydrokinesis
  - Molecular manipulation – Change the physical properties of some creature, thing, or condition. Examples: Psychometabolism, intangibility, healing/regeneration, environmental resistance, shape-shifting/replication, transvection, imperviousness, invisibility, elasticity
  - Space/Time manipulation – Move an object or another creature through space and time; by manipulation of the flow of time, Psionics have the power to shift three-dimensional energies into virtually any environment they can conceive (such as a world inside a mirror); They can use portals to transport themselves or others. They can also open gates to pocket dimensions, and even alternate and warp realities. They can also go back in time and alter the timeline. Examples: Psychoportation, astral projection, time travel, bilocation, multi-dimensionals walking, etherialization, stasis suspension
  - Thought manipulation – Communicate with others – especially other Psionics, mentally. Powerful psionics can completely alter a person's personality. Not only are they able to pick up on an emotion, if the emotion is strong enough, the psionic himself is able to feel that emotion. A frequent example is pain. Examples: Telepathics, extreme tele-empathy, tele-cybers, pain synthesizers, psionic blast, psychic weapons, mental attacks/defenses, mind control, and projected illusions
- lack of arcane rituals, gestures, components, and other typical features of magic.

== Systems ==
The following role-playing game systems present psionics, each in their own way. Often a system will present both magic and psionics. In these cases, psionics is usually defined in terms of its differences from and interactions with the magic system rather than on any specific capabilities. The following are some of the more prominent examples; there are also other variations and systems in use among games.

=== Bureau 13 ===
The Bureau 13 system, produced in the 80's and 90's, involved humans hunting down supernatural creatures. Psychic characters were one of the character options that could be optionally rolled to determine. This is one of the few systems that does not attempt to make psionics just a form of 'mind magic', i.e. that doesn't just use magic rules in a psionic context. Powers for magic and psionics are completely separate.

=== Champions/Hero System ===
The Hero System implements a wide variety of mechanical abilities, many of which are compatible with (and often used to build) psionic characters (often referred to as "mentalists" in Champions).

=== Dawning Star ===
The Dawning Star science-fiction setting introduces a modern take on the concept called Red Truth. This is a parallel dimension of pure information that overlays our own. The system itself uses the basic d20 Modern format, modified to comport with the concept. For example, information manipulation is much more viable than matter manipulation, and accessing the dimension can ultimately drive practitioners insane. Red Truth was first introduced in Helios Rising.

=== Dungeons & Dragons ===
Dungeons & Dragons introduced psionics as an option as far back as the Eldritch Wizardry supplement for the original Dungeons & Dragons in 1976. Psionics in D&D are designed to be on-par with magic, and so cover nearly every mechanical ability that the magic system does, organized into categories (disciplines) reminiscent of the Wizard's schools. The first edition of Advanced Dungeons & Dragons subdivided these disciplines into lesser powers called "devotions" and greater powers called "sciences". It also had separate classifications for psionic "attack" and "defense" powers/modes that were a sort of telepathic means of combat between psionically endowed beings.

An early discussion of psionics in AD&D is given in Dragon magazine issue 78, which is devoted to psionics, and the relation with magic within AD&D is discussed in Spells can be psionic, too: How and why magic resembles mental powers. The distinction it draws is that psionics are the exercise of "mental energy" (an internal source), while the power that "drives" magic (from magic users and clerics) are instead magical art or divinity (an external source), though these latter may involve minds and some use of mental power.

In most campaign settings, psionics are a secondary system, less prominent than magic. This is reversed in the Dark Sun setting, which features psionics prominently and magic secondarily, and treats magic (here called "arcane magic") unconventionally by AD&D standards.

The d20 System, being a de-branded version of the Dungeons & Dragons rules, shares these mechanics for psionics in nearly every detail.

=== GURPS ===
In the third edition of GURPS, there is a broad range of psionic abilities, vaguely game-balanced with its magic system. In the case of GURPS, categories of ability are “powers”, purchased and refined by the player during character creation.

In the fourth edition of GURPS, psi abilities are bought as all other Advantages, with a 10% discount for the fact that they can be neutralized by anti-psi powers and technologies. The reason of such a change was the game balance problem: third edition psis (and mages) were highly versatile at low point levels and became rapidly more powerful as point budgets increased.

Psionics are also found in the science fiction GURPS Humanx sourcebook.

=== In Nomine Satanis/Magna Veritas ===
In the In Nomine Satanis/Magna Veritas French roleplaying game, psionic powers (here called psi) are wielded by a few humans. These psis were first described in the Mindstorm supplement. The first psi were Adam and Eve, who were, in this game, not the first human beings, but instead mere humans infused with powers by God. God used them as the pawns of a small game with Satan, to see if humans untainted by society and the harsh life of Earth would succumb to evil. As told in the Bible, Eve and Adam eventually were tempted by Satan, and were thrown down to Earth. The modern psi are their surviving scions. Despite these powers, the psis are usually considered as weaker and much more fragile than the main protagonists of the game, angels and demons.

=== Lusternia, Age of Ascension ===
A Mage archetype is allowed to select Psionics out of their tertiary skillset – Dreamweaving, Runes or Psionics. Mages can specialize from the Psionics skill in either Telepathy or Telekenisis, each granting its own unique abilities. Monks can choose between Psionics and Acrobatics as well, and have the ability to specialize in Psychometabolism, a form of Psionics that affects the physical body.

=== Palladium Megaverse ===
Several of the games published by Palladium Books, most notably Beyond the Supernatural, feature psychic characters. The psychic powers in this universe are powered by Inner Strength Points (or ISP). Beyond the Supernatural (both 1st and 2nd editions) focuses almost exclusively on various forms of psychics, each with differing abilities. The games Heroes Unlimited, Palladium Fantasy Role-Playing Game and Rifts also make extensive use of these rules. The basic psionics system does not vary much between each product.

=== Paranoia, Gamma World, et al. ===
In some games (e.g. Paranoia and Gamma World), widespread, radiation-induced genetic mutation is the sole trigger responsible for psionic powers in player characters.

=== Space Opera ===
The roleplaying game Space Opera treated psionics as an advanced science with many fields of studies, three levels of functioning (Psionically dead, Psionically open, Psionically Awakened) and vast number of skills. Characters that were open and been Psionically attacked or had contact with a raw PK Crystal could awaken, and characters with very high Psionic scores might be "contacted" and trained.

=== Star Trek, Star Wars, et al. ===
Many role-playing games based on popular science fiction settings have at least telepathic powers available to players. Examples include the Psi Corps and other telepathic characters from Babylon 5, Vulcans from Star Trek, and the Jedi from Star Wars, all of whom have demonstrated various degrees of psionic abilities ranging from telepathy to telekinesis to mental domination.

=== Traveller ===
Traveller includes the mastery of psionics as a career option in the character creation stage. The odds of naturally developing psionic powers are unlikely (the player must roll a seven on the Events table, followed by a twelve, followed by a one), if a player achieves this, they have access to a number of powers that they may develop during the character creation phase.

=== Torg ===
In the Torg roleplaying game, psionics are only available at character creation to characters from the cosms of Core Earth (modern-day Earth) or the Star Sphere (the space opera cosm). Characters from other cosms 'can' learn psionic skills and powers during play, though when such characters use (or even possess) them it counts as a Contradiction.

=== White Wolf ===
In White Wolf Publishing's World of Darkness, Mages sometimes work magic through a paradigm of psionic power. In addition, more ordinary humans in the setting sometimes possess psychic abilities, and these powers and others like them are often referred to as Numina.

In the Trinity Universe, the psions of the Æon Trinity are created from ordinary humans to battle against the return of the mutated Aberrants.

=== PSI World ===
Psi World is a game from the 80's put out by Fantasy Games Unlimited that focused on psionic powers. The player characters were either psi-cops on the hunt for psychics, or they were psychics on the run. Being psychic was illegal in this dystopia. Psionics were the result of a plague that nearly wiped out humans.

=== Silver Cord ===
Another game that focuses on psionic powers.

=== The World of Synnabarr ===
A game by Raven c.s. McCracken, The World of Synnibarr.

=== Science-fiction themed RPGs in general ===
Psionics is sometimes used as a setting-compatible replacement for magic in role-playing games with science-fiction settings, particularly in the form of optional additional rules, such as in Star Frontiers. This is also true, to some extent, of settings, such as Star Trek, Warhammer 40,000 and Star Wars, taken from films, television series or literature, though often (as in the two examples given) psionics are already present in some form in the setting.

== See also ==
- List of psychic abilities
- Parapsychology
  - Psi (parapsychology)
- Psionics in science fiction
