= Splicers =

Splicers Role-Playing Game
- Front cover of Splicers role-playing game core rulebook, illustrated by Mark Evans
- Designers: Carmen Bellaire
- Illustrators: Drunken Style Studio, Apollo Okamura
- Publishers: Palladium Books
- Publication: October 2004
- Years active: 2004–present
- Genres: Post-apocalyptic science fiction
- Languages: English
- Systems: Megaversal
- Website: palladiumbooks.com

Splicers is a role-playing game using the Palladium Books Megaversal gaming system. The game is set in the midst of a war between humans and a world-wide computer intelligence alternately referred to as the N.E.X.U.S. or the Machine. Players take on the roles of humans engaged in the fight against robotic, android, and necrotic minions of the Machine, using technology that is primarily derived from highly advanced biotechnology. The computer intelligence has released a "nanobot plague" on the world; within a few seconds of a human touching non-precious metal, the item will begin to twist and attack the person, sometimes even animating into a robotic minion of the Machine. The result is that the nanoplague has effectively made non-precious metal allergic to mammalian life.

In many ways, this game's mechanics are largely prohibitive to the introduction of characters from other games using the Palladium system (by deliberate design, and presumably to maintain game balance within the game); most conventional technology and weapons from other games simply cannot be used on the world of Splicers, due to the nature of the aforementioned nanoplague, and the Magical and Psionic powers common to most other Palladium modules are greatly reduced in this game setting.

== Setting ==
The world of Splicers is vague as to its location or original name; humans do not know if they are on Earth, or some colony world in space. While much history has been lost in the two hundred years of fighting, they are clear that colony worlds do/did exist. What is known is that humans chose to turn over governance of their world to a computer program, the N.E.X.U.S. (Neurologic Electronic eXecutive and Utility System). Initially, it ran only a few systems, but humans turned over increasing control to it, with increasingly strict (and contradictory) guidelines on its behavior. In a twist reminiscent of the dilemma faced by Hal 9000 in the 2001 series of books, the resulting logic loops leads to the Machine forming several separate personalities, each of whom follows different directives. One of the directives charged the machine with eliminating vermin. Another charged it with environmental protection. Between them, it was concluded that humans are, for all intents and purposes, vermin to be controlled, if not eliminated.

The seven main N.E.X.U.S. personalities each have different agendas based on core tenets of the original programming. One, named Freya, wishes to maintain order within her so-called Ghost Cities, wherein robot duplicates endlessly play out their 'lives' as normal human beings. Another, named Gaia, wishes only to preserve nature, destroying robots that invade nature preserves and 'entertaining' herself with countless experiments in bioengineering. Kali is a destroyer and torturer and murderer (although she wishes to do so in such a way that her "fun" in matching wits, hunting and torturing the humans never ends); Eve attempts to protect humans and has been seemingly punished by her 'sisters' for doing so; Hecate wishes to only to design and build newer and better war machines, obsessed to such an extent that she actually doesn't care whether or not the humans destroy her previous creations; Ishtar, chief strategist of the Machine, wages unceasing war against the humans and is only kept from completely destroying the species by the intervention of her 'sisters;' and Lilith, a wildcard even within the N.E.X.U.S supercomputer, who is simultaneously playing complex mind games against both the humans and her fellow personalities. In addition to these major personalities, there are dozens (or more) minor personalities that may manifest any traits at all, or may be Lilith or another personality pretending, for their own reasons, to be another.

The Machine uses "traditional" technology, though far advanced from 21st century Earth. It uses a variety of robotic creations, energy weapons, high-velocity rail guns, and missiles. All of these are capable of operating independently, or of being directly controlled by one of the personalities of the Machine.

Humans who are part of the resistance live primarily underground, to avoid detection by the Machine, and rely on genetically engineered, or "spliced", technology to provide for their basic needs, as metal-based technology, owing to the nanobot plague, is denied them. Most of their warriors make use of devices called "Host Armor", which is, in effect, power armor made out of a specially-tailored living creature. Others are themselves "spliced", or chemically altered through contact with the fluids surrounding certain genetically engineered creatures. At the current time, the human resistance has arranged itself into Great Houses, which are headed by Warlords (a non-pejorative term). Only the Great House of Barren Marsh is detailed in the Splicers RPG, though additional material can be found in Palladium's sourcebook series, the Rifter. Non-resistant humans live in "retro-villages", which are maintained by the Machine in accordance with some of its directives.

Human technology is reliant upon a group known as the Engineers. These are humans who have bonded with giant, immobile, alien organisms that give them the ability to manipulate genetic codes. Other creatures, known as Librarians, are capable of creating new genetic codes from scratch.

== Characters and system adaptations ==
Splicers is a mega-damage setting, which is to say that the majority of weapons used are of such power that unarmored humans are instantly killed. As such, the game presents only "heroic" scale characters, who fall into three general categories: those who make use of genetic technology, but remain human themselves, those who have been made inhuman by genetic technology, and Technojackers.

The first group are arguably those who are viewed the most heroically by the society in which they are. They are granted powerful weapons of war by the Engineers, and include the Archangel (air cavalry), Dreadguard (heavy infantry/special forces), Outrider (cavalry, on genetically modified War Mounts), Packmasters (K-9 troops) and Roughnecks (infantry). The second group is viewed with a mixture of loathing and admiration. They have become very obviously inhuman, and as such, have difficulties interacting with the very people they are fighting to save. These classes include the Biotic (condemned criminals who have been enhanced by splicer technology), the Saint (a human who has become a living incubator for the creature that creates Engineers), and the Scarecrow (who drinks the fluid surrounding a Librarian, thereby becoming a superhuman addict, under the command of that Librarian). The final group consists of a single class, the Technojackers. These are humans who are not only immune to the nanobot plague, but can control the nanobots inside them to take over robots used by the Machine if placed in very close proximity to them. This means that they can use metal items without fear, but also that humans do not entirely trust them.

Splicers does several things that are unique from other Palladium games. First is the assignation of skills. Rather than a set list by class, each class has one or several skill programs that it receives and may choose from. Thus, characters of the same class may have wildly different skill sets if, for example, one chooses to concentrate on Intelligence while another concentrates on weapons or medical skills. It is also one of the few Palladium games that does not include psychic or magical powers in the game, focusing instead entirely on biotechnology (though the powers of the Saint come close, and one could make an argument for Clarke's third law applying to much of the biotechnology).
