= Robotech: The Shadow Chronicles Role-Playing Game =

Tabletop anime role-playing game

Robotech: The Shadow Chronicles Role-Playing Game is a role-playing game published by Palladium Books in 2008.

== Description ==
Robotech: The Shadow Chronicles Role-Playing Game is based on the 2006 anime Robotech: The Shadow Chronicles.

== Publication history ==
Robotech: The Shadow Chronicles Role-Playing Game was published by Palladium Books in 2008.

On August 26, 2006, a post on the company forums stated Palladium's intent to reacquire the Robotech license capitalize on the publicity of the anticipated feature film Robotech: The Shadow Chronicles. Contract negotiations lasted longer than anticipated, and it was September 6, 2007 before Palladium was able to announce the deal had been finalized.

The books in this new series are:

1. The Shadow Chronicles Role-Playing Game by Kevin Siembieda, published March 2008
2. The Macross Saga Sourcebook by Jason Marker and Kevin Siembieda, published October 2008
3. The Masters Saga Sourcebook by Jason Marker, published March 2009
4. The New Generation Sourcebook by Irvin Jackson, published November 2011
5. The Genesis Pits Sourcebook by Irvin Jackson, published November 2012
6. The Expeditionary Force Marines Sourcebook by Irvin Jackson, published July 2015

The Shadow Chronicles role-playing game was published in a "manga-sized" form factor, rather than the standard 8-1/2 by 11-inch size of all Palladium's prior Robotech publications, a move that engendered some controversy among Palladium fans, prompting the announcement of a full-sized, hardcover "deluxe" edition of the sourcebook. This option was initially not offered for the follow-on sourcebooks for the Macross Saga (2008) or The Masters Saga (2009) sourcebooks.

In late 2011, Palladium Books reversed course on its commitment to the manga sizes and announced that the New Generation sourcebook and all future Robotech RPG books would be released in the traditional 8.5x11" size. The announcement also promised that any reprints of the already released Macross and Masters books would be in the traditional size. In August 2013, the Macross Saga sourcebook was reprinted in full size. The Masters Saga was unavailable in the larger format until the summer of 2016.

== Reception ==
The return of Robotech to the Palladium catalog was warmly received by fans of the previous editions, but a subsequent decision to publish the new line of Robotech books in a 6x9 "manga" size drew mixed reactions. Some fans were attracted to the portability of the smaller form factor, but others observed that not only the older books of the Robotech RPG but also the entire catalog of other Palladium titles (such as the popular Rifts series) continued to be printed in the 8.5x11 size.
