= Macross II: The Role-Playing Game =

Tabletop role-playing game

- Front cover of the Macross II RPG core rulebook, illustrated by Kevin Long
- Designers: Kevin Siembieda, Jean Carrières, Martin Ouellette, Claude J. Pelletier, Marc-Alexandre Vézina
- Illustrators: Ghislain Barbe, Wayne Breaux, Jr., Dominique Durocher, Newton Ewell, Kevin Long, Thomas Miller, Bryant Velez, John Zeleznik
- Publishers: Palladium Books, Dream Pod 9
- Years active: July 1993 – August 1996
- Genres: Science fiction
- Languages: English
- Systems: Megaversal
- Website: palladiumbooks.com

Macross II: The Role-Playing Game is a role-playing game published by Palladium Books in 1993. Based on the Macross II mecha OVA and manga series, the game is structured around Palladium's Megaversal damage system.

== Development ==
Palladium Books was seeking to acquire more licenses in the early 1990s and did obtain a license for Macross II, allowing them to produce Macross II: The Role-playing Game (1993) and Macross II: Sourcebook One (1993). Ianus Publications (later known as Dream Pod 9) began to work for other companies as a design house, and thus developed three sourcebooks in 1994 for Palladium in their Macross II RPG. Palladium soon cancelled the new Macross II line when they decided that it would not match the success of Rifts.

== Main Game ==
The main RPG contains all the rules of the Megaverse system, and various options for creating characters, as well as special protocols for playing as the series' characters themselves. The 112-page book also contains technical data for many U.N. Spacy and Marduk combat vehicles. Further material is included with Sourcebook One: The UN Spacy.

== Deck Plans ==
In 1994, Palladium joined forces with Canadian role-playing game company Dream Pod 9 to produce a three-part Deck Plans supplement series. Each of the 64-page sourcebooks have schematics for all U.N. Spacy and Marduk warships. The books also introduced new rules for players who want to engage in ship-to-ship battles, with the warships now capable of using gun or missile volleys to attack targets. A campaign based around a Marduk Emulator is also included.

While some of the mechanical information presented is translated directly from the Japanese source material, the Dream Pod 9 acknowledged that some of it is also "pure conjecture".

== Publication history ==
- Macross II: The Role-Playing Game, Palladium Books July 1993.
- Macross II: Sourcebook One—The U.N. Spacy, September 1993
- Macross II Deck Plans Volume One, Palladium Books/Dream Pod9, March 1994
- Macross II Deck Plans Volume Two, Palladium Books/Dream Pod9, July 1994
- Macross II Deck Plans Volume Three, Palladium Books/Dream Pod9, December 1994

== Reception ==
In the March 1994 edition of Dragon (Issue 203), Rick Swan thought this game's description as a role-playing game was overstated, saying, "the role-playing elements take a back seat to the game’s main thrust; namely, giant robots smashing each other to bits... but that's okay. I doubt that many will be playing this game to savor the nuances of interpersonal relationships." He thought the game "excels in its descriptions of high-tech death machines", and found the rules "complicated but manageable."
