= Beyond the Supernatural =

Horror role-playing game

A Role-Playing Game of Contemporary Horror
- Front cover of Beyond the Supernatural first edition rulebook, illustrated by Richard Corben
- Designers: Randy McCall, Kevin Siembieda, Erick Wujcik
- Illustrators: Covers: Denis Beauvais, Richard Corben, John Zeleznik; Interiors: Stephen R. Bissette, Michael Dubisch, Kevin Long, Apollo Okamura, Ramón Pérez, Freddie E. Williams II
- Publishers: Palladium Books
- Publication: October 1987 (1st edition); January 2005 (2nd edition)
- Years active: 1987–present
- Genres: Horror, mystery
- Languages: English
- Systems: Megaversal
- Synonyms: Beyond; BTS
- Website: palladiumbooks.com

Beyond the Supernatural is a horror role-playing game published by Palladium Books. It has seen two editions released, both of which have introduced innovations to Palladium's standard mechanics. A versatile horror-themed game, it lends itself well to wildly different play styles and narrative tones, from schlock splatter-horror to intense psychological horror, with an entire spectrum of terror (humor, or action, etc.) in between. Beyond the Supernatural is implicitly set in the modern day, wherein magic and psychic powers are real and monsters and demonic cults exist, but out of the public eye. This, however, is not set in stone, and most of the character classes are flexible enough to account for variant settings or time periods.

== 1st edition ==
The first edition of Beyond the Supernatural, a 255-page book, was published September 1987 as a joint project between Randy McCall and Kevin Siembieda, the president and lead game designer of Palladium Books. In November 1990, Palladium also published the supplement Boxed Nightmares, a collection of adventures as well as a faux tabloid. Much of the art for both titles was created by Kevin Long, although the cover art of the original book was created by Richard Corben.

Players could select one of several Psychic Character Classes (P.C.C.s), which determined their abilities. These included Psychic Sensitives, Physical Psychics, Psi-Mechanics (who required devices as crutches to make use of their psychic powers), Arcanists (who had studied magic), Parapsychologists (who had neither psychic nor magical powers, but a great deal of knowledge about both), Nega-Psychics (psychics whose great disbelief in the supernatural actually disrupted its presence), and ordinary people. The system used the then-standard Palladium combat and skills system, including variable educational levels for most characters. Two individuals of the same P.C.C. could have substantially different training backgrounds and skill sets, with one being a doctoral student and another a high-school drop-out, depending either on the roll of the dice or character concept.

The first edition's innovation's on Palladium's system was in terms of its supernatural powers. Beyond the Supernatural introduced the concept of Potential Psychic Energy (P.P.E.), which is invested in skills and psychic powers as a person develops, and is used to power magical spells. This replaced the older "spells per day" system that had been used in earlier versions of the Palladium Fantasy Role-Playing Game (1983), Heroes Unlimited (1984), and Teenage Mutant Ninja Turtles & Other Strangeness (1985). Psychic powers were also now organized into the categories of Physical, Healing, and Sensitive, instead of experience levels as they had been previously. Both of these innovations, and the metaphysical underpinnings for them, became standard in Palladium Megaversal games.

=== Reception ===
In the October 1988 edition of Dragon (Issue 138), Ken Rolston found much to like about Beyond the Supernatural, including its similarities to Dungeons & Dragons/Advanced Dungeon & Dragons that would enable new players to quickly adapt to its rules; interesting player-character roles well-designed for co-operative play; and "well-developed and well written" occult and supernatural settings. However, Rolston criticized the gamemaster notes and sample scenarios, saying that they "do nothing to support these virtues, and are particularly inappropriate to the systems, PCs, and campaign background established in the rest of BTS. This flaw compromises what might otherwise have been a solid role-playing package." He concluded with a strong recommendation, saying, "On the basis of the campaign materials alone, this is a very valuable resource for horror/supernatural role-playing game masters. In some ways, it even outshines its competitor, Call of Cthulhu."

In his 1990 book The Complete Guide to Role-Playing Games, game critic Rick Swan found the character generation rules "tedious", and thought that the resultant characters "are a little too powerful for the game's own good." However, he noted that "The game shines in its treatment of magic, monsters and other supernatural elements ... the text sparkles and is a delight to read." Swan concluded by giving the game a rating of 3 out of 4, calling the game "a solid, entertaining horror RPG. It's no classic, but if a subsequent edition dumps the goofy science-fiction elements, it might be some day."

== Boxed Nightmares: Adventure Sourcebook ==
Boxed Nightmares is a collection of horror scenarios/adventures with a faux tabloid for use with Beyond the Supernatural first edition. The book contains a separate sixteen page newspaper players' handout covering the adventures. In November 1990 Palladium published the supplement with much of the art for the titles created by Kevin Long, and cover art of the original book created by Richard Corben. Boxed Nightmares is over eighty pages containing six adventures, three new monsters plus villains, rules for creating secret organizations, the arcanist thief, GM tips, and the newspaper was packaged with the book.

== 2nd edition ==
Cover of Beyond the Supernatural™, 2nd Edition, illustrated by John Zeleznik.

The second edition of Beyond the Supernatural was released in January 2005 after a lengthy development period. Like its predecessor, it is set in a modern version of Earth, where supernatural forces act out of sight of most of the populace, but may be altered to fit into other time periods or settings. Unlike the first edition, however, it does not have a section on magic nor an extensive bestiary; the two supplements that are to have detailed these aspects were to have immediately followed the core rulebook but are yet to be published.

The second edition maintained several things from the first edition. For most characters, education and occupation are still independent of P.C.C., reflecting the more modern and realistic veneer of the setting. All of the previous P.C.C.s, except the Arcanist, returned, and were joined by other P.C.C.s reflecting other aspects of psychic ability, such as the pyrokinetic Firewalker and the Autistic Psychic Savant. Many P.C.C.s were updated, and the idea of purchasing powers directly with P.P.E. was abandoned except in the case of the Psi-Mechanic and Genius/Natural Athlete; additional powers are selected, not purchased.

The second edition, however, made some very significant changes to maintain the mystery of the setting, preventing characters from bringing "proof" of monsters or psychic powers to the world at large. Psychic powers are difficult to recreate under laboratory conditions, and totals of Inner Strength Points (I.S.P.), the "fuel" for psychic powers, are very small when not under a direct supernatural threat. Furthermore, supernatural creatures dissolve completely when destroyed, leaving nothing behind to be analyzed or photographed.
