= Rifts (role-playing game) =

Tabletop role-playing game

- Front cover of Rifts Role-Playing Game, Ultimate Edition, illustrated by Scott Johnson
- Designers: Kevin Siembieda, C. J. Carella, Kevin Long, Patrick Nowak, Julius Rosenstein, et al.
- Publishers: Palladium Books
- Publication: August 1990 (1st edition); August 2005 (Ultimate edition)
- Years active: 1990–present
- Genres: Post-apocalyptic science fiction
- Languages: English
- Systems: Megaversal
- Website: palladiumbooks.com

Rifts is a multi-genre role-playing game created by Kevin Siembieda in August 1990 and published continuously by Palladium Books since then. It takes place in a post-apocalyptic future, deriving elements from cyberpunk, science fiction, fantasy, horror, western, mythology and many other genres.

Rifts serves as a cross-over environment for a variety of other Palladium games with different universes connected through "rifts" on Earth that lead to different spaces, times, and realities that Palladium calls the "Rifts Megaverse". Rifts describes itself as an "advanced" role-playing game and not an introduction for those new to the concept.

Palladium continues to publish books for the Rifts series, with about 80 books published between 1990 and 2011. Rifts Ultimate Edition was released in August 2005 and designed to update the game with Palladium's incremental changes to its system, changes in the game world, and additional information and character types. The web site is quick to point out that this is not a second edition but an improvement and expansion of the original role playing game.

== Background ==
The RPG had the tentative title Boomers, named after the original name for the Glitter Boy power armor until Kevin Siembieda changed the name after finding out it was in use for Bubblegum Crisis.

== Setting ==
The Rifts world is Earth, but hundreds of years into the future. Ley lines, lines of magic energy, criss-cross the earth forming supernatural geographic areas such as the Bermuda Triangle. Points where Ley Lines intersect, called a nexus, are places of powerful magic, such as the Pyramids of Giza and Stonehenge. If a Ley Line nexus energy surges or is purposely activated, the fabric of space and time can be torn, creating a rift - a hole in space-time leading to another place, time, or dimension.

Ley lines contain magical energy called Potential Psychic Energy (PPE), which is found in various places, objects, and animals and is particularly strong in children. An adult's level of PPE can vary based on other factors. PPE also allows Psionics which uses energy known as Inner Strength Points or ISP. Psychic phenomenon (more commonly called psionics) can also vary from individuals, ranging from none at all to Master level abilities. Psychic abilities can manifest in virtually any way imaginable. Some psychics develop differently, such as psi-stalkers; human mutants that feed on psychic energy.

=== Earth ===
Rifts begins with two future-historical premises: first, a golden age of humanity occurs, with tremendous advances in science, technology, military, and society. Humanity as a whole is at peace as a majority of Earth's nations decide to cease world war and begin to share ideas and technology freely.

Much of the Solar System is conquered, humanity's wars will end, and harmony will reign. This golden age is followed by an unknown cause near the winter solstice and a rare planetary alignment, causing a disaster that cascades into tremendous destruction via a ripple effect. The cataclysm begins with unprecedented storms, earthquakes, tsunamis, and volcanic eruptions, which kill millions of people. The Ley Line networks that crisscross the globe are energized, causing rifts to open both on Earth and throughout the Megaverse.

For hundreds of years after the holocaust, many creatures, both mythical beasts and aliens, come through the Rifts to wreak havoc. The old world gone, a new Dark Age dawns and humanity's shrinking population is reduced, due to catastrophe and domestic failure, immeasurably. This period is covered in Palladium's Rifts Chaos Earth spin-off series.

Rifts initially takes place in 101 P.A. (equivalent to the year 2387) 289 years after this event. The "Post-Apocalypse" calendar was established by the formation of the Coalition States in 2286. By this time, most of the disasters have quieted down, though Earth is still bathed in PPE. The planet's mystical energy has attracted aliens from other dimensions, who continue to arrive through the Rifts both accidentally and deliberately. The humanoid creatures that arrive on Earth are referred to as Dimensional Beings (called D-Bees). Some resemble familiar fantasy races, such as elves and dwarfs, while others were created specifically for the game setting. Non-humanoid creatures have also arrived, including monstrous creatures and mystical demons.

To cope with these natural, supernatural, and alien menaces, the human race has adapted in a variety of ways, many of them borrowed from the technological developments of the lost Golden Age. Powered armor suits and giant vehicles are frequently used to combat the dangers of Rifts, but more invasive augmentation is common. This has three basic categories: "Juicers" augment themselves chemically, the "Borgs" augment themselves mechanically, and "Crazies" use performance-enhancing brain implants. All such augmentations boost strength, speed, endurance, and dexterity to superhuman levels. However, all come at great cost. Chemicals cause the body to wear out faster, decreasing life span to a few years.

Mechanical Borg augmentation causes a loss of humanity when those with multiple limb and organ replacements become more machine than human. Brain implants cause mental instability ranging from mild phobias to crippling neurosis or psychosis.

==== North America ====
The strongest power in North America is the Coalition States (CS), which is based in the arcological city of Chi-Town and lays claim to northern Illinois, all of Iowa, the Texas Panhandle, Missouri, and the eastern half of Ontario, Canada. The second greatest power is Free Quebec, a former Coalition State that seceded following a civil war with the other Coalition States.

Mexico is ruled by a group of vampire kingdoms, who treat humans as little more than food. North of the Rio Grande, west of Texas and roaming most of the American Southwest are large nomadic bands/tribes of bandits who collectively form the Pecos Empire, consisting of El Paso, Los Alamos, and Houstown. Much of the western United States has more or less willingly reverted to a mix of modern and past technology akin to the Wild West.

The Royal Canadian Mounted Police managed to survive the great cataclysm, though Canada itself did not. The Mounties have become an independent law enforcement force called the Tundra Rangers, patrolling the northern wilderness.

The Midwest, both upper and central, is home to most of North America's population. The Manistique Imperium and Northern Gun in Michigan's Upper Peninsula, both Coalition allies, are among the largest weapons manufacturing areas on the continent. New Lazlo is one of the largest cities in Michigan's southern portion. Chillicothe in Missouri is a large supplier of Coalition food processing and growing. Missouri's southern half, home to the city-states of Whykin (Poplar Bluff) and Kingsdale (West Plains) are in constant opposition to the CS and claim independence. Arkansas is home to the independent CS ally El Dorado. Southern Illinois and the Ohio Valley is home to the Federation of Magic. Also in the Ohio Valley is Psyscape, a city-state founded by psychics.

Tolkeen was a major city in the former Minneapolis region in early Rifts books; the city welcomed users of magic. A military campaign made by the Coalition States (which is the primary event of 109 PA) resulted in the magic-user kingdom being wiped off the map.

In the Northeast, the city-state of Lazlo, named after supernatural researcher and writer Victor Lazlo, was built upon the ruins of Toronto. This major center of civilization is well known as a melting pot of humans, D-Bees and other beings, and is the home of Techno-Wizardry. Mad Haven is the name given to the ruins of Manhattan; tectonic forces during the cataclysm have moved it into the coast, creating a peninsula. It is seen by most denizens of Rifts Earth as a refuge of demons and madness.

==== South America ====
The return of Atlantis caused the Amazon River basin to flood most of western South America, giving it the nickname The Land of a Thousand Islands. The Empire of the Sun, consisting of Cuzco, Nazca, Arequipa and Lima, created a wide range of technology and magic, including magic derived from the Nazca lines.

In Argentina, the Silver River Republics of Cordoba (the South American Chi-Town), Santiago (one of the most tolerant human nations on Rifts Earth), Achilles (a nation founded by mutants), and New Babylon, a nation where humans and aliens coexist) have thrived and created nations whose strength rivals that of the CS.

In Bolivia, freed Human and D-Bees formed the Megaversal Legion: a mercenary company with one of the highest levels of technology on Rifts Earth.

==== Europe ====
- England has become a vast wilderness again, broken up by the occasional giant Millennium Tree or feudal kingdom, complete with a New Camelot and a new King Arthur, partially being manipulated by an alien intelligence disguised as Merlin. Also the magic of Druids and Faeries has become commonplace.
- In Germany, the New German Republic, with assistance from the Triax corporation, battles against a gargoyle empire that has apparently conquered much of Europe.
- France was overrun by gargoyle hordes and other monsters and cults. New Camelot, the NGR, and the Gargoyle Empire are all making moves into the territory as well.
- Russia is ruled by a collection of warlords who rule through the use of vast armies and Cyborg troops. The only major civilized nation is the Sovietski, a remnant of the Russian empire.

==== Asia ====
Much of China has been overrun by demons. The remnants of the People's Republic of China live in the pre-Rifts subterranean city Geofront, possessing pre-rifts technology equal or exceeding any other human nation on Rifts Earth, fighting to free their nation from the grip of the Yama Kings.

Japan has become a mixture of tradition and technology. The Samurai and warrior monks of the New Empire battle Oni demons and high-tech raiders from the Otomo Shogunate. Despite their ardent anti-technology sentiments, one of the New Empire's closest allies is the Republic of Japan, an alliance centered on three pre-Rifts cities (Hiroshima, Iwakuni, and Kure) that were accidentally rifted off the planet at the exact moment of the Great Cataclysm, and sent hundreds of years into their future. The rest of the archipelago (which now has the pre-Rifts main island of Honshū divided into two islands from the risen sea levels) is dominated by smaller breakaway governments.

Korea - both North and South - has been completely overrun by demons with nothing remaining of the pre-Rifts nations.

==== Africa ====
Much of Africa has gone back to nature, making the land a wild, mysterious Dark Continent again, where only those foolhardy enough to ignore the cautionary tales would willingly go.

In Egypt, the ley lines coursing through the pyramids have brought Rama-Set, a dragon who has conquered the locals and established the Phoenix Empire (with Rama-Set, in human form, leading it as Pharaoh).

Meanwhile, the Four Horsemen of the Apocalypse are traveling across the continent, seeking to reunite and combine their powers into an ultimate destroyer of a monster; but a group of powerful adventurers is hot on their tails, including the legendary rogue scholar Erin Tarn (marked for death by the Coalition States for her writings, which criticize the Coalition States), and the 20th century's most accomplished time-displaced expert on the paranormal, Victor Lazlo (whose writings were so popular among P.A. magic-users that they named a kingdom after him), and even the disguised (and unfortunately amnesiac) Egyptian Goddess Isis.

==== Atlantis ====
Cover of the first edition Rifts core rulebook, illustrated by Keith Parkinson, depicting a Splugorth slave barge.

The lost continent of Atlantis appeared after the cataclysm that caused the rifts. It rose from the sea, returning from an alternate dimension to which it had shifted to ages ago.

Now controlled by the Splugorth, a race of Supernatural Intelligences, Atlantis is a land ruled by magic and monsters. An inter-dimensional marketplace where any number of creatures, including humans, are bought and sold as slaves, and often serve as fodder in gladiatorial arenas. Enhanced by parasites or other magic, they are then pitted against one another or bizarre, monstrous creatures.

The Splugorth are evil, trans-dimensional conquerors that are reminiscent of supernatural entities described in the works of H. P. Lovecraft. They are huge, tentacled monstrosities with a giant eye atop their massive, amorphous bodies. The Splugorth rule through the use of subject races enslaved by Bio-Wizardry, a form of mysticism that involves the use of parasites and symbiotes to enhance one's abilities. The Splugorth are also masters of Rune Magic (such as the creation of the fabled rune weapons), an offshoot of Bio-Wizardry. They are an evil power that spans many dimensions and are the sworn enemies of the True Atlanteans who have been banished from Atlantis. The Splugorth minions are a particular threat on the coast lines of adjacent North and South America, conducting slave raids against human and D-Bee settlements to feed the insatiable hunger of the Atlantean slave markets, and in some cases, the hunger (often literal) of Atlantis' extradimensional visitors.

==== Australia ====
A vast inland sea has flooded the centre of the continent leaving notable landmarks like Uluru completely submerged. With the return of magic to the land, the Aborigines began using Dreamtime magic. The "civilized" world has devolved into often competing city-states, with Melbourne and Perth the most technologically advanced. In the Northland exist the races known as the Mokoloi and Shadow People. Tikilik's children flood the land.

==== The Oceans ====
Deep within the Mariana Trench, an alien intelligence known as the Lord of the Deep gradually grows in size, intending to devour every living thing on Earth. It is opposed by the Whale Singers, rebellious creations of the monster, and the descendants of the United States Navy, now called the New Navy. Other forces above and below the waves include a floating city known as Tritonia, pirates including the ruthless aliens known as the Horune, monsters, dolphins/orca/whales, and extradimensional invaders.

=== Other settings ===
Further supplements to the Rifts game have expanded the setting to include:

- Mutants in Orbit - Several space stations and colonies existed in orbit at the time of the Great Cataclysm. The descendants of their inhabitants, including many Moreau-style mutant animals, still survive in space, fighting against each other, and trying to prevent any force from entering or leaving Earth. (For use with Rifts & After The Bomb.)
- The Three Galaxies - An alternative space opera setting of a series of galaxies centered on the planet and dimensional nexus of Phase World. Several explorers, cults, and interstellar and intergalactic states are involved in the search for the Cosmic Forge, a powerful artifact that is said to have created the universe.
- Skraypers - Superheroes lead a resistance movement against alien conquerors amongst the massive cities of their home planet. Like Mutants in Orbit, Skraypers is designed for both Rifts (where it is set in the Three Galaxies), and another Palladium game, in this case, Heroes Unlimited.
- Wormwood - Knights and symbiote-bearing warriors fight against demons on a living planet.
- Rifts Chaos Earth - Earth as it was during and immediately after the devastation of the Apocalypse. (It was supposed to be an alternate Earth where the governments and civilizations of the Golden Age were able to stay intact all because the first nuke strike was one minute after midnight.)
- Manhunter Universe - An alternative dimension to Rifts:Earth, published as a sourcebook under license from Palladium Books by Myrmidon Press. In this dimension, humankind fights an intense battle against artificially intelligent robots bent on human extermination.

Additionally any other Palladium RPG can become the setting for a Rifts style campaign.

- ALL Palladium Books - Though the above sourcebooks are more specifically related to Rifts all of Palladium's games are considered to be within the same "megaverse" and so all of their other games can be used as source books. Though the canon incarnation of Chaos Earth is Rifts' past it is also commonly accepted that Beyond the Supernatural is the distant past (due to the presence of the same mystic energy AND use of Lazlo's name) which may or may not include Ninjas and Superspies, Heroes Unlimited, After the Bomb (or if the player has the books Teenage Mutant Ninja Turtles), System Failure, Dead Reign and even Nightspawn/bane or Robotech or Macross II. But Palladium Fantasy RPG or Recon happen in entirely different dimensions so could be source books but not Rifts' past. While Splycers on the other hand is intentionally a big mystery it may or may not be an alternate reality or a completely different dimension, so it is all up to the GM.

=== Weapons and technology ===
Despite the near-total collapse of human civilization, most of the powerful technology managed to survive the centuries. There are many reasons given for the survival or rapid development of the high technology. In The New German Republic/Triax Industries the infrastructure survived. In the case of the Coalition States it is suggested that their benefactor is a rogue artificial intelligent computer named ARCHIE 3. In Japan, the main technology base is a part of the country that was "rifted" from Earth's past. The technology, regardless of the unlikelihood of the varied factions obtaining it, is in fact instrumental to the continued survival of mankind in a world where many creatures now can survive being struck by the main gun of a battle tank.

The most prolific weapons on Rifts Earth, in nearly all regions, are energy weapons. The most common are lasers, ion beams, plasma cannons, and particle beams. Also popular are rail guns, and miniaturized rockets inappropriately called Mini-Missiles, as they have no guidance system. Due to the proliferation of supernatural monsters such as vampires, silver-plated melee weapons and silver-plated bullets have also risen in popularity. For more conventional opponents, vibro-blades (knives, swords, and other edged weapons whose edges vibrate rapidly to increase cutting power) are the weapon of choice for hand-to-hand combat.

Rail guns are highly advanced in Rifts, and are used in a way similar to machine guns in modern times. However, the weapon, ammunition belts/drums/clips, and energy packs to power the weapon make most rail guns very heavy, and are usually restricted to Powered Armor, 'Borgs, and vehicles. The RG13 Rapid Acceleration Electro-Magnetic Rail Gun is a weapon that creates an immensely deafening sonic boom when fired.

Alongside hover vehicles and Powered Armor, a common vehicle used in battle in Rifts Earth is the Giant Robot. In addition to their role as war machines, Giant Robots are also intimidating, and turned out to be good in combating very large supernatural creatures (such as dragons, demons, and giants).

An increasingly popular use of technology is Techno-Wizardry, which is a fusion of magic and technology. The aims of Techno-Wizardry are to use magic not only to power technology, but to make it more effective than it was prior to magic infusion. Techno-Wizardry also encompasses the creation of more traditional magic weapons, so a Techno-Wizard can make both a flaming sword or a plasma cannon, often with many of the same components and spells.

The ultimate in magic are Rune Weapons, indestructible, extremely powerful weapons with the life-force of an intelligent being driving them. Rune weapons are capable of communicating with their wielders, animating and fighting by themselves, casting magic, and may harm potential users if they don't like their motives and personality (based on the RPG tradition of assigning an "alignment" to a character of good, selfish or evil), and can bind themselves psychically to those they do. Some of the strongest Rune Weapons, reminiscent of Michael Moorcock's fictional sword Stormbringer, are Soul Drinkers, capable of tearing the soul out of their victims, irrevocably killing them with only the slightest scratch.

== System ==
=== Character classes ===
While the game books rapidly expanded the number of character classes to a large number, the original game book contained four overall character groups with approximately 4 to 5 character classes per group.

1. Men of Arms are the combat specialists of the game. They include cyborgs, freelance warriors called Headhunters, the Coalition Army, the Glitterboy powered armor pilot (the Glitterboy named for its laser proof chrome alloy armor), the Cyber-Knight psychic warrior, the drug enhanced Juicer who will die in a few years as a side effect, and the Crazy who has microchips installed into their brains to force higher performance and psychic abilities at the expense of their sanity.
2. Scholars and Adventurers. These are the wilderness scout, the rogue scientist, the rogue scholar, the Cyber-doctor, the Operator (a mechanic second to none), City-Rat street punk and computer hacker, and even a vagabond who has minimal gear and skills.
3. Racial Character Classes. These are not trades or skills the player learns, but a group of classes that were born with their powers. They include hatchling dragons, the Dog-Boy from the Coalition which is a mutated dog that walks upright, talks, and can psychically detect the supernatural, the Psi-Stalker which is more powerful than a Dog-Boy, but must also feed on mystic energy which a Dog-Boy does not, the Burster with psychic powers over fire, and the Mind Melter with large amounts of psychic power.
4. Men of Magic. These are the Ley Line Walker with special abilities when on Ley Lines and normal magic spell casting, the Shifter who is taught their magic by an external supernatural creature and specialize in travel magic, the Mystic who is instinctive and self-taught and half psychic, the Techno-Wizard who can install magical properties into technological devices

=== Damage and firepower ===
One important note about Rifts versus other game systems is scale: weaponry and combat in Rifts are generally far more destructive than in other gaming systems. For example, in Rifts and other Palladium games, a simple knife inflicts between 1 and 4 "points" of damage. This point system makes sense when considering a small animal killed has between 1 and 4 "hit points," which make it realistic that it could be killed by a single strike. Yet even a basic Rifts-era laser pistol will cause between 100 and 400 points of damage (more than enough to totally destroy a small car in one shot). This means someone shot by such a laser pistol would be literally cut in half without protective armor and trees, bystanders, or anything else in the line of fire would meet a similar fate. Thus, an average player character in Rifts Earth with standard-issue armor and weapons has the effective durability and firepower of a modern tank. Even minimal skirmishes may leave deep craters or even level towns from collateral damage.

To accommodate this scale, Mega Damage Capacity or MDC is an important game concept. Each point of mega-damage is equal to 100 points of "Structural Damage" or SDC. Armor and vehicles of this power level have protection of equivalent levels. For example, most personal body armor in the Rifts setting has on average 40 to 80 MDC, comparable to a modern-day tank, and Rifts armored vehicles start around 100-200 MDC and go up from there. Exceedingly powerful beings such as Dragons, gods and alien intelligences have mega-damage bodies caused by the high levels of magic energy present in this game setting, and their MDC can soar into the thousands, if not tens of thousands.

As Rifts has no systematic method of designing weaponry, the game is criticized frequently for severe power escalation; often magic, equipment, and character classes from new books are more potent than those from an earlier one (sometimes even with the same character class), with the result of many thinking they are thus required to buy the most recent supplement to keep up with the power curve (This is parodied in an 8-bit Theater episode fittingly titled "Glitter Boy").

Rifts Conversion Books are designed to help facilitate the transition of magic and psychic characters and creatures from other Palladium game lines into this new landscape, for which many automatically gain increased benefits due to the magic-rich environment. But a pistol or rifle that fires projectiles in our time fires the same bullets with the same effects during Rifts times and is effectively useless in most combat situations. It does retain certain value as an antique, and from a survival standpoint can be desirable as a hunting weapon.

=== Skills ===
Rifts, like other Palladium games, use percentile dice to calculate skill success. Each character, based on training, intelligence, and experience level, has a base percentage chance of success. If a number equal to or below a player's percentage is rolled on percentile dice, then the use of the skill is considered to be a success. While modifiers are suggested in cases of unusual difficulty or proficiency, these are rare in the system, usually reserved for special skills. Some criticize this as being more cumbersome than the D&D d20 System while Palladium defends their method as allowing for a wider variety of skills.

However, Combat is determined through the use of 20 sided dice. In its most basic form the combat system is an opposed roll of two dice, with additions and subtractions for character skills and environmental factors. One character will generally be offensive, the other defensive, and the highest dice roll will determine if the defender is struck by the offensive character's attack.

== Game supplements and adventures ==
- Rifts Sourcebook (1991)
- Rifts World Book 1: Vampire Kingdoms (July 1991)
- Rifts Conversion Book (November 1991)
- Mutants in Orbit (March 1992) – A dual Rifts/After the Bomb title
- Rifts World Book 2: Atlantis (September 1992)
- Rifts Sourcebook 2: The Mechanoids (November 1992)
- Rifts World Book 3: England (March 1993)
- Rifts World Book 4: Africa (June 1993)
- Rifts Dimension Book 1: Wormwood (December 1993)
- Rifts World Book 5: Triax and The NGR (February 1994)
- Rifts Conversion Book 2: Pantheons of the Megaverse (April 1994)
- Rifts Sourcebook 3: Mindwerks (July 1994)
- Rifts Mercenaries (August 1994)
- Rifts World Book 6: South America (October 1994)
- Rifts Dimension Book 2: Phase World (December 1994)
- Rifts Dimension Book 3: Phase World Sourcebook (March 1995)
- Rifts World Book 7: Underseas (June 1995)
- Rifts World Book 8: Japan (October 1995)
- Rifts World Book Nine: South America 2 (November 1995)
- Rifts Index & Adventures Volume One (February 1996)
- Rifts World Book 10: Juicer Uprising (March 1996)
- Rifts World Book 11: Coalition War Campaign (July 1996)
- Rifts Game Master Reference Screen (August 1996)
- Rifts World Book 13: Lone Star (April 1997)
- Rifts World Book 14: New West (May 1997)
- Rifts World Book 15: Spirit West (July 1997)
- Rifts Sourcebook 4: Coalition Navy (August 1997)
- Rifts World Book 16: Federation of Magic (October 1997)
- Rifts World Book 12: Psyscape (December 1997)
- Rifts Index & Adventures Volume Two (December 1997)
- Rifts Dimension Book 4: Skraypers (May 1998)
- Rifts World Book 17: Warlords of Russia (August 1998)
- Rifts World Book 18: Mystic Russia (December 1998)
- Rifts World Book 19: Australia (January 1999)
- Rifts World Book 20: Canada (August 1999)
- Rifts World Book 21: Splynn Dimensional Market (September 1999)
- Rifts World Book 23: The Xiticix Invasion (November 1999)
- Rifts World Book 22: Free Quebec (March 2000)
- Rifts Coalition Wars 1: Sedition (June 2000)
- Rifts Coalition Wars 2: Coalition Overkill (August 2000)
- Rifts Coalition Wars 3: Sorcerers' Revenge (October 2000)
- Rifts Coalition Wars 4: Cyber-Knights (December 2000)
- Rifts Coalition Wars 5: Shadows of Evil (February 2001)
- Rifts Coalition Wars 6: The Final Siege (August 2001)
- Rifts Game Master Guide (September 2001)
- Rifts Book of Magic (October 2001)
- Rifts Adventure Guide (February 2002)
- Rifts Aftermath (April 2002)
- Rifts Dimension Book 5: Phase World: Anvil Galaxy (May 2002)
- Rifts Bionics Sourcebook (September 2002)
- Rifts Dark Conversions (December 2002)
- Rifts Dimension Book 7: Megaverse Builder (March 2003)
- Rifts Adventure Sourcebook: Chi-Town 'Burbs: Forbidden Knowledge (March 2003)
- Rifts Adventure Sourcebook: Chi-Town 'Burbs: Firetown and the Tolkeen Crisis (May 2003)
- Rifts Adventure Sourcebook: Chi-Town 'Burbs: The Black Vault (July 2003)
- Rifts Adventure Sourcebook: Chi-Town 'Burbs: The Vanguard (September 2003)
- Rifts Dimension Book 6: Phase World: The Three Galaxies (2003)
- Rifts World Book 24: Rifts China One: The Yama Kings (January 2004)
- Rifts Dimension Book 8: Naruni Wave Two (April 2004)
- Rifts World Book 25: Rifts China Two: Heroes of the Celestial Court (August 2004)
- Rifts World Book 26: Dinosaur Swamp (June 2004)
- Rifts MercTown (March 2005)
- Rifts Merc Ops (May 2005)
- Rifts Adventure Sourcebook: Mercenary Adventures (October 2005)
- Rifts World Book 27: Adventures in Dinosaur Swamp (February 2006)
- Rifts World Book 28: Arzno - Vampire Incursion (March 2006)
- Rifts World Book 29: Madhaven (July 2006)
- Rifts World Book 30: D-Bees of North America (April 2007)
- Rifts Dimension Book 10: Hades, Pits of Hell (August 2007)
- Rifts Dimension Book 11: Dyval, Hell Unleashed (March 2009)
- Rifts Sourcebook: Shemarrian Nation (April 2009)
- Rifts Dimension Book 13: Phase World: Fleets of the Three Galaxies Sourcebook (July 2009)
- Rifts Dimension Book 12: Phase World: Dimensional Outbreak (March 2010)
- Rifts World Book 31: Triax Two (April 2010)
- Rifts Phase World: Heroes of the Megaverse Sourcebook (September 2010)
- Rifts Dimension Book 14: Phase World: Thundercloud Galaxy (April 2011)
- Rifts World Book 32: Lemuria (April 2012)
- Rifts Black Market (August 2012)
- Rifts Sourcebook: Vampires (April 2013)
- Rifts World Book 33: Northern Gun 1 (October 2013)
- Rifts World Book 34: Northern Gun 2 (May 2014)
- Rifts World Book 35: Megaverse in Flames (August 2014)
- Rifts Sourcebook – The Coalition States: Heroes of Humanity (May 2016)
- Rifts Dimension Book 15: The Secrets of the Atlanteans (July 2017)
- Rifts World Book 36: Sovietski (March 2018)
- Rifts Bestiary Volume One (July 2019)
- Rifts Psi-Ops: Psychic War (2022) -formerly Coalition Manhunters
- Rifts Titan Robotics Sourcebook (May 2023)

== Spinoffs and alternate editions ==
Several novels, a MUD, several mush/muxs and large amounts of fan fiction have been based on the world of Rifts. A licensed Rifts video game (Rifts: Promise of Power), was released in November 2005 for the Nokia N-Gage.

Siembieda has stated that he would like to see Rifts games developed for other consoles. However, he has stated that the niche nature of the role-playing game industry means it is hard to attract prospective developers to the property.

Rifts Collectible Card Game is an out-of-print collectible card game released in September 2001 and was also one of the last games made by Precedence. It was based on the role-playing game.

=== Savage Rifts ===
In 2015 Pinnacle Entertainment Group announced a series of supplements converting Rifts to the Savage Worlds system. April 2016 Pinnacle announced a 2-month Kickstarter. By November 2016 they had dubbed this project Savage Rifts.

Titles released in the series include:

1. The Tomorrow Legion's Player's Guide (PG)
2. Game Master's Handbook (GM)
3. Savage Foes of North America (SFoNA)
4. Character Folio
5. Archetypes Set 1
6. Archetypes Set 2
7. Coalition Field Manual
8. Contamination Principle

Adventures:

1. The Garnet Town Gambit (TGTG)
2. Tome of Destiny

== Reception ==
John Kovalic called Rifts "the runaway success of 1990". Rod Lockwood of the Springfield News-Sun in 1996 declared Rifts "one of the most popular games on the market" noting that regularly outsold other products in local shops in Springfield, Ohio.

In Issue 48 of Challenge, Lester W. Smith found the information about rifts and the new Earth gave both players and referees a good base of knowledge. He especially liked the section on magic, saying, "The magic system, when taken as a whole, is clear, concise and logical, explaining magic in general in a new and 'realistic' light." However, he didn't like the lack of an introductory adventure, commenting, "For a game that is meant to stand alone, it's surprising that no introductory scenario was included. Nor were any character sheets, handouts or pull-outs provided to aid the players." Smith had thought that the completely new rules system would clear up some of the long-standing problems with old Palladium rule systems. However, Smith found that "Instead of clearing up old discrepancies, Rifts creates many of its own." He also found the rules badly organized. Despite these issues, Smith concluded, "I highly recommend Rifts because of its setting and potential for great scenarios. [...] There is enough here to keep any GM busy thinking up new scenarios and creating new archvillains for players for quite a while."

Josh Timbrook reviewed Rifts in White Wolf #26 (April/May, 1991), rating it a 4 out of 5 and stated that "Overall, Rifts is an incredible roleplaying experience, and its setting seems to be as original and fun to play as the recent multi-genre games, Shadowrun and Torg. Those who are into bleak worlds, hi-tech magic, twisted rituals, fascist empires, brutal weaponry, mind-boggling power armor, and fantastic stories should really give it a try."

In Issue 13 of Arcane (December 1996), Lucya Sachnowski was disappointed in the Rifts World Book 11: Coalition War Campaign, saying that "There are just five pages of short adventure ideas which are usable and versatile - providing a good mixture of combat and moral dilemmas - but they aren't enough." She gave the book a below-average rating of 6 out of 10.

In a readers' poll conducted by the UK magazine Arcane in 1996 to determine the 50 most popular role-playing games of all time, Rifts was ranked 22nd. The magazine editor Paul Pettengale commented: "It's the ultimate in old-style high-energy RPGs. It uses a class-and-level system, and its supplements are full of new character classes, as well as weapons, robots and power armour. Fantasy-style creatures are a bit less common, and tend to be rather conventional elves and orcs - although it's perfectly possible to play a baby dragon. One of the key concepts is 'mega-damage', which is important when you're playing with giant robots and such. This is the game for people who want to have everything possible in their campaigns - and then to blow a lot of it up with cool super-weapons."

Scott Taylor for Black Gate in 2013 rated Rifts as #9 in the top ten role-playing games of all time, saying "Think about how many gaming groups have fallen apart, how many campaigns have turned to dust, all because people got tired of the same old story. Rifts changes all that, because one week your characters could be fighting aliens in giant mecha and the next they could be raiding a dragon's hoard with Vikings. Not bad, Mr. Siembieda, not bad at all..."

In his 2023 book Monsters, Aliens, and Holes in the Ground, RPG historian Stu Horvath noted, "Rifts is the RPG born out of dumping all of the toys out into the middle of the room and them fight — G.I. Joes in TIE fighters, He-Man fighting M.A.S.K., the rubber great white shark inexplicably flying through the air to hunt ThunderCats. The game aims to answer every variation of the comic book store question, 'Who would win?'"

=== Notoriety ===
Three young men were arrested in December 1999 for an alleged plot to murder a Brockville police officer, but the mother of one of the men told a local newspaper that they were only playing out scenarios from Rifts and the people who overhead them and called the police were mistaken; Siembieda insisted that there was no connection between the post-apocalyptic fantasy game and any murder plots in the real world.
