= Palladium Books =

Game publisher

Palladium Books, Inc.
- Type: Private
- Industry: Role-playing game (pen and paper) publisher
- Genre: Fantasy, horror, science fiction, superhero
- Founded: Detroit, Michigan (April 1981)
- Founder: Kevin Siembieda (principal); Anthony Falzon; Alex Marciniszyn; William Messner-Loebs; Erick Wujcik
- Headquarters: 39074 Webb Court; Westland, Michigan 48185-7606
- Products: Beyond the Supernatural; Heroes Unlimited; Palladium Fantasy RPG; Rifts
- Website: palladiumbooks.com
- Footnotes "Palladium Books Company Profile". Westland, MI: Palladium Books. December 19, 2009.

Palladium Books is a publisher of role-playing games (RPGs) best known for its Rifts series (1990–present). Palladium was founded April 1981 in Detroit, Michigan, by current president and lead game designer Kevin Siembieda, and is now based in Westland, Michigan. The company enjoys the support of a small but dedicated fanbase who praise its various game series for their innovative settings and ease of adaptability to various personal preferences, play styles, and power levels.

== History ==
The first game released by Palladium Books was The Mechanoid Invasion in 1981, followed by the first-editions of the Palladium Fantasy Role-Playing Game in 1983 and Heroes Unlimited in 1984, with The Valley of the Pharaohs released between the two.

Other popular titles include adaptations of Teenage Mutant Ninja Turtles (1985) and Robotech (1986). Palladium was also one of the major distributors of Robotech merchandise for several years. Between the late 1990s and early 2000s, all of Palladium's licenses lapsed and were not pursued for renewal. In September 2007, Palladium finalized negotiations with Harmony Gold USA to produce Robotech: The Shadow Chronicles Role-Playing Game, an RPG based on Robotech: The Shadow Chronicles. This license was discontinued in 2018.

Palladium claims that it was the first publisher in the RPG industry to adopt the practice of perfect binding its books, a move that has since been emulated by many other companies. Palladium also releases most of its titles in paperback, whereas other major RPG publishers mostly publish hardback editions. This format choice has allowed Palladium to provide full sourcebooks at a lower cost than many other game lines.

Although Palladium did not establish the use of universal game mechanics, it was one of the first companies to successfully create role-playing games in multiple genres; for this reason, its house system may be described as "Megaversal" – "not universal, but more than just one world".

=== Licensing ===
Palladium has licensed several of their intellectual properties to third-party developers.

The first book ever published by another company under license from Palladium was Rifts: Manhunter from Myrmidon Press, released December 1994. Palladium cancelled the license in May 1996.

In October 2000, Rifts was licensed to the now defunct Precedence Entertainment for a collectible card game. In May 2004, Rifts was licensed to create the Rifts: Promise of Power video game for the failed Nokia N-Gage gaming platform.

In May 2003, Palladium announced that Jerry Bruckheimer Films and Walt Disney Pictures had optioned the rights to make a film based on Rifts. At the time, Bruckheimer was said to be developing the movie in conjunction with screenwriter David Franzoni. An April 19, 2006, press release asserted that "until Jerry Bruckheimer has a script he loves, the movie can't get the green light." In the April 14, 2011, weekly update, Siembieda said that the film option would be renewed for a ninth year.

In 2015, Palladium entered into an agreement with Pinnacle Entertainment Group to publish Rifts material under the Savage Worlds game system. Multiple books, maps, and other supplements for Savage Worlds: Rifts have been released in the years since.

=== Embezzlement case and financial difficulties ===
On April 19, 2006, Siembieda issued a statement that revealed Palladium's critical financial difficulties due to alleged embezzlement and theft resulting in losses from $850,000 to $1.3 million, coupled with a series of delays in negotiating license deals for their properties in other media (the Nokia N-Gage game, the Jerry Bruckheimer movie, a massively multiplayer online game license, and other potential deals). They raised money to continue operations by selling a signed and numbered – but not, strictly speaking, "limited edition" – art print by Siembieda, as well as by urging fans to buy directly from their online store if their financial situations would allow for it.

An April 26, 2006, article in the Kingsport Times-News revealed that Steve Sheiring, Palladium's former sales manager, had been sentenced in a plea bargain to a misdemeanor conviction, one year of probation, and ordered to pay $47,080 in restitution to Palladium Books in connection with these thefts. It also provided more information about the thefts, which took place from 2002 to 2004, and were only discovered when Palladium took inventory.

== Criticisms ==
Palladium is entirely controlled and owned by Siembieda. Some writers who have been published by Palladium have stated that Siembieda's method of management was too centralized and not adapted to the size the company had reached (no delegation of responsibilities, lack of open dialogue with employees, bad interpersonal relationships), which they cited as a reason they were no longer working for the company. One of the writers later apologized for the manner in which he made his statements, but did not retract his claims.

=== Robotech RPG Tactics ===
Palladium and Siembieda received criticism regarding the handling of the Robotech RPG Tactics Kickstarter campaign, ultimately losing the Robotech license it had held for 30 years. The campaign, which raised $1,442,312 with 5,342 backers on May 20, 2013, was described as a "complete disaster" by Polygon, and as "downright catastrophic" by Critical Hit.

In 2014, with rewards still delayed, Palladium issued a plea to backers seeking permission to sell any available copies of Robotech RPG Tactics to attendees of Gen Con 2014, despite an earlier promise to make copies unavailable to the public until backer rewards were fully delivered. Sets received at Gen Con had manufacturing flaws, missing items, items that were supposed to be painted but weren't, and poorly written instructions.

By the end of 2014 and early 2015, Palladium began fulfilling the lower-tier rewards. It promised to send the remaining, mostly higher-tier items in a second wave. Backers raised a case with the Better Business Bureau in 2015, with fewer than 200 of the 5,000 backers reporting that they had received their items by 2016.

In 2018, Palladium announced that it would not be able to issue any of the remaining "wave 2" rewards to backers, as the licence was due to expire, retail sales had slowed, and the company did not have the funds to complete production. Some backers were offered the option to exchange their rewards for other stock, although supplies were limited. Printed materials missing from initial backer rewards and updated assembly instructions were later released as low-resolution watermarked PDFs on the website DriveThruRPG for backers to print their own copies, free of charge.

=== Loss of the Robotech license ===
On February 27, 2018, Palladium Books announced they had lost the Robotech IP as it was not renewed by Harmony Gold USA, the current IP owner. Palladium had announced that the remaining items from the Robotech RPG Tactics Kickstarter campaign had been canceled. Palladium had until March 31, 2018, to liquidate its remaining stock.

=== Conversions ===
Palladium is aggressive in preventing wide distribution of fan-made conversions of their games to other systems (such as the d20 System), and also strongly discourages converting the intellectual property of others into their system; while they cannot prevent it, doing so is not allowed in venues owned by Palladium Books. Palladium also routinely threatens legal action against fans who distribute conversions in other venues by issuance of cease and desist orders. When asked why Palladium was so much stricter in regard to conversions than other game companies, Siembieda stated that the policy had been adopted due to advice from Palladium's lawyers, to shield Palladium from liability for conversions of other parties' intellectual property. The sole exception to this policy is the licensing agreement held with Pinnacle Entertainment Group for conversion of the Rifts line to the Savage Worlds system.

== Game lines ==
The Rifter is a magazine published for all lines.

- After the Bomb, a post-apocalyptic RPG that began as an alternative campaign setting for Teenage Mutant Ninja Turtles & Other Strangeness, but soon developed into its own series. In it, mutant animals struggle for survival, often against human supremacist nations.
- Beyond the Supernatural, a modern horror RPG along the lines of Call of Cthulhu. An incomplete second edition core rulebook was released in January 2005, with more information about the world, which is assumed to be similar to the real world, but with supernatural happenings which no one notices.
- Rifts Chaos Earth, a prequel to Rifts, set immediately after a war that triggers a magical apocalypse, opening dimensional gates that unleash monsters upon a technologically advanced future Earth.
- Dead Reign, a post-apocalyptic RPG where mankind is waging war on a zombie menace.
- Heroes Unlimited, a superhero RPG.
- Macross II, based on the anime of the same name. The license has lapsed and was not renewed.
- The Mechanoid Invasion, a science fiction RPG set during the battle between human colonists and the Mechanoids, a race of psionic, cybernetic beings who wish to exterminate humanoid life.
- Nightbane (formerly called Nightspawn), is a horror RPG set in the year 2004 (a near-future setting when the game was released). It differs from Beyond the Supernatural in that the supernatural elements are not as hidden and more open. The series is placed after "Dark Day", an event where the earth was plunged into an unnatural, starless night for 24 hours, and supernatural entities infiltrated or subverted various governments and organizations across the globe.
- Ninjas & Superspies is based on both martial-arts and espionage movies with some science fiction elements mixed in.
- Palladium Fantasy Role-Playing Game is a fantasy RPG set in a unique world, which was the home of Siembieda's fantasy games.
- Phase World / Three Galaxies setting, a space opera science fiction offshoot of the RIFTS universe.
- Revised RECON, originally a Vietnam War-based RPG, it was later updated for modern-era combat involving mercenaries in fictional hotspots mirroring such places as Africa and South America.
- Rifts is set primarily on Earth, three hundred years after a war-triggered magical apocalypse, opening dimensional gateways and heralding the return of magic, Atlantis, and numerous invasions by alien forces. Rifts is Palladium's flagship line.
- Robotech, based on the anime series of the same name. The original Robotech license began in 1986 and lapsed in 2001. In 2007 Palladium reacquired the license and published The Shadow Chronicles in 2008. On May 20, 2013, Palladium Books raised $1,442,312 from a Kickstarter campaign to develop a new miniature wargaming system called Robotech RPG Tactics. The license for all Robotech merchandise ended in March 2018.
- Splicers is a post-apocalyptic RPG where humans have turned to organic technology to fight a robotic threat.
- Systems Failure is a post-apocalyptic game in which the Y2K bug heralded the collapse of the power and telecommunications grids with the arrival of extra dimensional energy "bugs".
- Teenage Mutant Ninja Turtles & Other Strangeness was based on the original comic books. However, due to waning sales (blamed on the childish nature of the original television cartoon), the license was not renewed when it expired in 2000. Many concepts established in TMNT continue in both Heroes Unlimited and After the Bomb.
- Valley of the Pharaohs is an historical RPG set in Ancient Egypt.
