= List of role-playing game publishers =

This is a list of companies that have produced tabletop role-playing games in English, listed in order of the year that the company published its first role-playing game-related product (game, supplement, or magazine). Also listed is the years the company was active, and a list of notable role-playing games the company has produced. This list makes note of the first edition of each game which a company published, and does not try to list subsequent editions of the same game published by the same company.

Company	Years	First RPG product	Other notable role-playing games
TSR	1973-1997	Dungeons & Dragons (1974)	Boot Hill (1975), Empire of the Petal Throne (1976), Metamorphosis Alpha (1976), Gamma World (1978), Top Secret (1980), Gangbusters (1982), Star Frontiers (1982), Marvel Super Heroes (1984), The Adventures of Indiana Jones Role-Playing Game (1984), Conan Role-Playing Game (1985), DragonQuest (second edition, 1989), Buck Rogers XXVC (1990), Amazing Engine (1993), High Adventure Cliffhangers Buck Rogers Adventure Game (1993), Alternity (1998), Marvel Super Heroes Adventure Game (1998)
Flying Buffalo	1970-	Tunnels & Trolls (1975)	Starfaring (1976), Monsters! Monsters! (second edition, 1979), Catalyst supplement line (1981), Mercenaries, Spies and Private Eyes (1983)
Games Workshop	1975-	Owl & Weasel #6 (1975)	Golden Heroes (1984), Judge Dredd: The Role-Playing Game (1985), Warhammer Fantasy Roleplay (1986), Call of Cthulhu (third edition, 1986), RuneQuest (1987 edition), Stormbringer (third edition, 1987), Dark Heresy (2008)
GDW	1973-1996	En Garde! (1976)	Traveller (1977), Twilight 2000 (1984), Traveller: 2300 (1986), Space: 1889 (1989), Cadillacs and Dinosaurs (1990), Dark Conspiracy (1991), Dangerous Journeys (1992)
Judges Guild	1976-1983+	City-State Map (1976)	City State of the Invincible Overlord (1976)
Fantasy Games Unlimited	1975-1991+	Bunnies & Burrows (1976)	Chivalry & Sorcery (1977), Starships & Spacemen (1978), Villains and Vigilantes (1979), Gangster! (1979), Skull and Crossbones (1980), Space Opera (1980), Land of the Rising Sun (1980), Bushido (third edition, 1981), Aftermath! (1981), Merc (1981), Wild West (1981), Daredevils (1982), Privateers and Gentlemen (1983), Lands of Adventure (1983), Other Suns (1983), Flashing Blades (1984), Psi World (1984), Swordbearer (1985), Freedom Fighters (1986), Year of the Phoenix (1986)
Metagaming Concepts	1975-1983	Monsters! Monsters! (1976)	The Fantasy Trip (1980)
Gamescience	1965-1969; 1974-	Space Patrol (1977)	Superhero: 2044 (1977), Empire of the Petal Throne (second edition, 1984), TWERPS (1987)
Chaosium	1975-	All the Worlds' Monsters (1977)	RuneQuest (1978), Basic Role-Playing (1980), Thieves' World (1981), Stormbringer (1981), Call of Cthulhu (1981), Worlds of Wonder (1982), Superworld (1983), Elfquest (1984), Ringworld (1984), King Arthur Pendragon (1985), Hawkmoon (1986), Prince Valiant (1989), Elric! (1993), Nephilim (1994), Dragon Lords of Melniboné (2001)
Heritage Models	1974-1983	Dungeonmaster's Index (1977)	Star Trek: Adventure Gaming in the Final Frontier (1977), John Carter, Warlord of Mars (1978), Knights and Magick (1980), Swordbearer (1982)
Grimoire Games	1979-1984, 1993	The Arduin Grimoire (1978)	
SPI	1969-1982	DragonQuest (1980)	Universe (1981)
Steve Jackson Games	1980-	The Space Gamer #27 (1980)	Toon (1984), GURPS (1986), In Nomine (1997)
Task Force Games	1980-1996	Dungeon Tiles (1980)	Heroes of Olympus (1981), Delta Force: America Strikes Back! (1986), Prime Directive (1993)
FASA	1980-2001	I.S.P.M.V. Tethys (1980)	Behind Enemy Lines (1982), Star Trek: The Role Playing Game (1983), The Doctor Who Role Playing Game (1985), MechWarrior (1986), Shadowrun (1989), Legionnaire (1990), Earthdawn (1993)
Gamelords	1980-1984	Thieves' Guild (1980)	
ICE	1980-	Arms Law (1980)	Rolemaster (1982), Middle-earth Role Playing (1984), Spacemaster (1985), Cyberspace (1989), Champions (fourth edition with Hero Games, 1989), Lord of the Rings Adventure Game (1991), High Adventure Role Playing (2003)
TimeLine	1980-1991, 2001-	The Morrow Project (1981)	Time and Time Again (1984)
Hero Games	1981-	Champions (1981)	Espionage (1983), Justice, Inc. (1984), Danger International (1985), Fantasy Hero (1985), Robot Warriors (1986), Star Hero (1989), Hero System (1990), Dark Champions (1993)
Palladium Books	1981-	The Mechanoid Invasion (1981)	Valley of the Pharaohs (1983), The Palladium Role-Playing Game (1983), Heroes Unlimited (1984), Teenage Mutant Ninja Turtles & Other Strangeness (1985), Robotech: The Role-Playing Game (1986), Revised Recon (1987), Beyond the Supernatural (1987), Ninjas & Superspies (1988), Rifts (1990), Macross II: The Role-Playing Game (1993), Nightspawn (1995), Systems Failure (1999), Rifts Chaos Earth (2003), Splicers (2004), Robotech: The Shadow Chronicles Role-Playing Game (2008), Dead Reign (2008)
Yaquinto Publications	1979-1983	Pirates and Plunder (1981)	Man, Myth & Magic (1982), Timeship (1983)
Mayfair Games	1982-	Beastmaker Mountain (1982)	Role Aids supplement line (1982), DC Heroes Role Playing Game (1985), Batman Role-Playing Game (1989), Chill (second edition, 1990), Underground (1993)
Bard Games	1982-1990	The Compleat Alchemist (1983)	The Atlantis Trilogy (1984), Talislanta (1987)
Avalon Hill	1958-1998	James Bond 007 (1983)	Powers & Perils (1984), Lords of Creation (1984), RuneQuest (third edition, 1984), Tales from the Floating Vagabond (1991)
Columbia Games	1972-	Hârn (1983)	HârnMaster (1986)
West End Games	1974-2009	Paranoia (1984)	Ghostbusters (1986), The Price of Freedom (1986), Star Wars: The Roleplaying Game (1987), Torg (1990), Shatterzone (1993), Masterbook (1994), The D6 System (1996), Men In Black (1997), The Hercules & Xena Roleplaying Game (1998), DC Universe Roleplaying Game (1999), The Metabarons Roleplaying Game (2001)
Pacesetter	1984-1986	Chill (1984)	Time Master (1984), Star Ace (1984), Sandman: Map of Halaal (1985)
SkyRealms Publishing	1984-1988	SkyRealms of Jorune (1984)	
Target Games	1979-1999	Drakar och Demoner (1984)	Mutant (1984), Mutant Chronicles (1993), Kult (1991)
Digest Group Publications	1985-1993	The Traveller's Digest #1 (1985)	
Leading Edge Games	1982-1993	Phoenix Command (1986)	Living Steel (1987), Aliens Adventure Game (1991)
R. Talsorian	1985-	Mekton (1986)	Teenagers from Outer Space (1987), Cyberpunk 2013 (1988), Dream Park (1992), Castle Falkenstein (1994), Bubblegum Crisis (1996), Armored Trooper VOTOMS (1997), The Dragonball Z Adventure Game (1999)
White Wolf	1986-2018	Arcanum #1 (1986)	Vampire: The Masquerade (1991), Ars Magica (third edition, 1992), Werewolf: The Apocalypse (1992), Mage: The Ascension (1993), Wraith: The Oblivion (1994), Street Fighter: The Storytelling Game (1994), Changeling: The Dreaming (1995), HoL (second edition, 1995), Vampire: The Dark Ages (1996), Werewolf: The Wild West (1997), Trinity (originally Aeon, 1997), Mage: The Sorcerer's Crusade (1998), Hunter: The Reckoning (1999), Wraith: The Great War (1999), Aberrant (1999), Adventure! (2001), Exalted (2001), Demon: The Fallen (2002), Victorian Age: Vampire (2002), Engel (2002), Dark Ages: Mage (2002), Dark Ages: Inquisitor (2002), EverQuest Role-Playing Game (2002), Dark Ages: Werewolf (2003), Orpheus (2003), Dark Ages: Fae (2004), Vampire: The Requiem (2004), Werewolf: The Forsaken (2005), Mage: The Awakening (2005), Warcraft: The Roleplaying Game (2005), Pendragon (fifth edition, 2005), Promethean: The Created (2006), Changeling: The Lost (2007), Scion (2007), Big Eyes, Small Mouth (third edition, 2007), Hunter: The Vigil (2008), Geist: The Sin-Eaters (2009)
Lion Rampant	1987-1990	Whimsy Cards (1987)	Ars Magica (1987)
New Infinities Productions	1986-1988	Sea of Death (1987)	Cyborg Commando (1987)
Creations Unlimited	1986-1987	Prisoners of the Maze (1987)	
Pagan Publishing	1990-	The Unspeakable Oath #1 (1990)	
Atlas Games	1990-	Tales of the Dark Ages (1990)	Over the Edge (1992), Ars Magica (fourth edition, 1996), Unknown Armies (1999), Feng Shui (second edition, 1999), Furry Pirates (1999), Rune (2001), Northern Crown (2005)
AEG	1990-	Shadis #1 (1990)	Legend of the Five Rings Roleplaying Game (1997), 7th Sea (1998), Farscape (2002), Spycraft (2002), Stargate SG1 (2003)
Phage Press	1991-2005	Amber Diceless Role-playing (1991)	
Dream Pod 9	1985-	Night's Edge (1992)	Project A-Ko: The Roleplaying Game (1995), Heavy Gear (1995), Jovian Chronicles (1998), Tribe 8 (1998), Gear Krieg (2001), CORE Command (2003)
Wizards of the Coast	1990-	The Primal Order (1992)	Talislanta (second edition, 1992), Everway (1995), Gamma World (fifth edition, 2000), Dungeons & Dragons (2000), Star Wars Roleplaying Game (2000), d20 Modern (2002)
Hogshead Publishing	1994-2002	Interactive Fantasy #2 (1994)	The Extraordinary Adventures of Baron Munchausen (1998), Puppetland (1999), Violence (1999), Pantheon and Other Roleplaying Games (2000), SLA Industries (1st Ed reprint, 2000), De Profundis (2001), Nobilis (second edition, 2002)
Kenzer & Company	1994-	The Kingdom of Kalamar (1994)	HackMaster (2001), Aces & Eights: Shattered Frontier (2007)
Last Unicorn Games	1994-2000	Aria Worlds (1994)	Star Trek: The Next Generation Role-playing Game (1998), Star Trek Role Playing Game (1999), Star Trek: Deep Space Nine Role Playing Game (1999), Dune: Chronicles of the Imperium (2000)
Grey Ghost Press	1995-	FUDGE (1995)	Gatecrasher (1996), Terra Incognita (2001), The Deryni Adventure Game (2005)
Holistic Design	1992-2006	Fading Suns (1996)	Rapture: The Second Coming (2002)
Pinnacle Entertainment Group	1994-	Deadlands: The Weird West (1996)	Deadlands: Hell on Earth (1998), Brave New World (1999), Deadlands: Lost Colony (2002), Savage Worlds (2003)
Imperium Games	1996-1998	Marc Miller's Traveller (fourth edition of Traveller, 1996)	
Guardians of Order	1997-2006	Big Eyes, Small Mouth (1997)	Dominion Tank Police (1999), Demon City Shinjuku (2000), Tenchi Muyo! (2000), Ghost Dog (2000), Hong Kong Action Theatre! (second edition, 2001), Heaven & Earth (second edition, 2001), El-Hazard (2001), Silver Age Sentinels (2002), The Authority Role-Playing Game (2004), Ex Machina (2004), Tékumel: Empire of the Petal Throne (2005), A Game of Thrones (2005)
Eden Studios	1997-	Conspiracy X (1997)	CJ Carella's WitchCraft (second edition, 1999), All Flesh Must Be Eaten (2000), Buffy the Vampire Slayer Roleplaying Game (2002), Angel Roleplaying Game (2003), Armageddon: The End Time (2003), Terra Primate (2003), Army of Darkness (2005), Ghosts of Albion (2008)
Fantasy Flight Games	1995-	Long Shades (1997)	Twilight Imperium: The Role-Playing Game (1999), Blue Planet (second edition, 2000), Fireborn (2004), Grimm (2007), Warhammer Fantasy Roleplay (third edition, 2009), Rogue Trader (2009), Deathwatch (2010), Black Crusade (2011), Star Wars Roleplaying Game (2012)
Margaret Weis Productions	1998-	Sovereign Stone Quick-Start (1998)	Serenity Role Playing Game (2005), Battlestar Galactica Role Playing Game (2007), Cortex Role Playing Game System (2008), Demon Hunters Role Playing Game (2008), Supernatural Role Playing Game (2009), Smallville Roleplaying Game (2010), Leverage: The Roleplaying Game (2011)
Hekaforge Productions	1999-2008	Lejendary Adventure (1999)	
Green Knight Publishing	1998-2003	Tales of Chivalry & Romance (1999)	King Arthur Pendragon: Book of Knights (2000)
Issaries	1997-2003	Hero Wars (2000)	HeroQuest (second edition of Hero Wars, 2003)
Necromancer Games	2000-2009	The Wizard's Amulet (2000)	
Green Ronin Publishing	2000-	Ork! The Role-playing Game (2000)	Spaceship Zero (2002), Mutants & Masterminds (2002), Blue Rose (2005), True20 (2005), Warhammer Fantasy Roleplay (second edition, 2005), A Song of Ice and Fire Roleplaying (2009), Dragon Age (2009), DC Adventures (2010)
Troll Lord Games	2000-	After Winter's Dark (2000)	Castles & Crusades (2004)
Pelgrane Press	1999-	Dying Earth Quick Start Rules (2000)	The Esoterrorists (2006), Fear Itself (2007), Trail of Cthulhu (2008), Mutant City Blues (2009), Skullduggery (2010), Ashen Stars (2011), Night's Black Agents (2012), 13th Age (2013)
Goodman Games	2001-	Broncosaurus Rex (2001)	Etherscope (2005), Eldritch Role-Playing System (2008), Dungeon Crawl Classics Role Playing Game (2012)
Privateer Press	2000-	The Longest Night (2001)	
Mongoose Publishing	2001-	The Slayer's Guide to Hobgoblins (2001)	The Judge Dredd Roleplaying Game (2002), Sláine: The Roleplaying Game of Celtic Heroes (2002), Armageddon: 2089 (2003), The Babylon 5 Roleplaying Game (2003), Conan: The Roleplaying Game (2004), Paranoia XP (2004), Lone Wolf: The Roleplaying Game (2005), Jeremiah: The Roleplaying Game (2005), Starship Troopers: The Roleplaying Game (2005), WARS Roleplaying Game (2005), Infernum (2005), RuneQuest (2006 edition), Traveller (2008 edition), Lone Wolf Multiplayer Game (2010)
Adept Press	2000-	Elfs (2001)	Sorcerer (2001), Trollbabe (2002), It Was a Mutual Decision (2006), Spione: Story Now in Cold War Berlin (2007), S/lay w/Me (2009)
Paizo Publishing	2002	Dragon #299 (2002)	Pathfinder Roleplaying Game (2009),Starfinder Roleplaying Game (2017)
Arc Dream Publishing	2002-	Talent Operations Command Intelligence Bulletin No. 2: Talent Operations Groups (2003)	Wild Talents (2006), Nemesis (2006)
Atomic Sock Monkey Press	2003-	Dead Inside (2003)	Monkey, Pirate, Ninja, Robot: The Roleplaying Game (2004), Truth & Justice (2005), The Zorcerer of Zo (2006), Swashbucklers of the Seven Skies ()
Evil Hat Productions	2001-	Don't Rest Your Head (2006)	Spirit of the Century (2006), A Penny for My Thoughts (2009), Swashbucklers of the 7 Skies (2009), The Dresden Files Roleplaying Game (2010), Diaspora (2009), Happy Birthday, Robot! (2010),
Cubicle 7 Entertainment	2003-	CS1: Cannibal Sector One (2006)	Qin (2007), Starblazer Adventures (2008), Victoriana (second edition, 2009), Doctor Who: Adventures in Time and Space (2009), Legends of Anglerre (2010), The Laundry (2010), The One Ring Roleplaying Game (2011)
Kobold Press	2006-	Steam & Brass (2006)	
Catalyst Game Labs	2007-	Emergence (2007)	
Savage Mojo	2007-	Shaintair: Immortal Legends	Suzerain Legends (2018)
McNabb Games	2014 - Present	Morgalad Fantasy RPG	

== See also ==
- List of tabletop role-playing games
- List of play-by-mail games
- List of role-playing game designers
- List of game manufacturers
- Timeline of tabletop role-playing games
- History of role-playing games
