= George Vasilakos =

American game and graphic designer

- Born: United States
- Occupations: Art director, businessperson
- Children: 3

George Vasilakos is president and art director of Eden Studios, Inc., and manages the company's daily operations.

== Early life ==
As a youth living in Colonie, New York, Vasilakos was a comic book collector who estimated that he had around 3500 comics as of 1986.

== New Millenium Entertainment ==
After finishing art school, George Vasilakos opened a store called Imagination Games & Comics in Albany, New York, in 1992, which provided table space to play games. Several role-playing gamers started to frequent the store, one of them the attorney M. Alexander Jurkat. Vasilakos and this circle of gamers went to Gencon together, where they were impressed by the new collectible card game (CCG) Magic: The Gathering. Five members of the group, including Vasilakos and Jurkat, decided to publish their own CCG and formed New Millennium Entertainment (NME), with Vasilakos as the art director.

Their first product, released in 1995, was Battlelords CCG. Although the game initially sold well, the company printed too many copies, and the resultant production and storage bills for the unsold stock started to weigh on the company's finances.

Attempting to diversify, NME looked for a role-playing game to publish, and came across a small press game called Conspiracy X, which was thematically based on the then-popular television show The X Files. Working with the game's original writers, Rick Ernst, Shirley Madewell, and Chris Pallace, NME fleshed out the rules and produced a 224-page softcover book in 1996. The game proved popular, but sales revenues were not enough to save NME.

== Eden Studios ==
Increasing debt forced NME out of business, and Vasilakos closed Imagination Games & Comics in June 1997. The following month, Vasilakos and Jurkat joined with investor Ed Healy to announce that they had started Eden Studios with Vasilakos working for the company full-time, and they had acquired the rights to continue the Conspiracy X line.

Vasilakos and Jurkat were fans of the work done by C.J. Carella, and in July 1998 they announced an exclusive license to the WitchCraft and Armageddon role-playing games by Carella, previously published by small-press roleplaying publisher Myrmidon Press.

== Last Unicorn Games ==
In 1999, Last Unicorn Games offered Vasilakos the position of art director, so he moved to California to work in their office, while remaining president of Eden Studios. Vasilakos retained the position of art director when Last Unicorn was bought by Wizards of the Coast in 2000, and then bought by Decipher, Inc. in 2001.

During this time, Vasilakos and Christopher Shy entered the zombie role-playing market, creating All Flesh Must Be Eaten in 2000. At Decipher, Vasilakos worked on the Star Trek Roleplaying Game and The Lord of the Rings Roleplaying Game. Vasilakos directed all the graphics work on the Buffy the Vampire Slayer Roleplaying Game, Angel Roleplaying Game, and Army of Darkness Roleplaying Game lines for Eden Studios.

In 2003, Vasilakos opened another game store in Albany, New York called Zombie Planet. Vasilakos used edenstudios.net as a website for Zombie Planet, to sell adventure games. Zombie Planet briefly had its own website in the early 2020s. Vasilakos offered curbside service during the COVID-19 pandemic because customers could not enter the Zombie Planet store.

In 2012, Vasilakos appeared on a gaming panel at Gencon discussing "Zombies in Gaming". In 2016, he helped graphic artist Francis Hogan develop the kid-friendly RPG Adventure Maximus. Vasilakos was the inspiration behind the Abduction and Knights of the Dinner Table: HACK! card games.

== Personal life ==
Vasilakos lives in Loudonville, New York with his wife and two sons, Theo and Dimitri, and daughter Sophia.
