= M. Alexander Jurkat =

American game designer

- Occupations: Game designer, attorney

M. Alexander Jurkat is an American attorney, and a game designer who has worked primarily on role-playing games.

== Career ==
M. Alexander Jurkat is an attorney who gave George Vasilakos the idea to license a roleplaying game called Battlelords of the 23rd Century (1990) that Jurkat had worked on, which was adapted as the Battlelords (1995) collectible card game through Vasilakos' new company New Millennium Entertainment. New Millennium published the role-playing game Conspiracy X.

New Millennium went out of business due to debts related to its CCG, and on July 4, 1997, Vasilakos, Jurkat, and investor Ed Healy announced their new company, Eden Studios; they also obtained the rights to the role-playing game Conspiracy X from New Millennium Entertainment. Jurkat edited Eden's version of Conspiracy X. Jurkat designed the Conspiracy X Game Master's Screen and co-wrote the tabletop game supplement Nemesis.

Vasilakos and Jurkat, both fans of C.J. Carella's role-playing game work, announced in July 1998 that Eden acquired a license to Carella's WitchCraft and Armageddon, both previously published by Myrmidon Press. Eden Studios made an arrangement with Steve Jackson Games to produce Jurkat's supplement GURPS Conspiracy X (2002). Vasilakos and Jurkat made Unisystem the house rules system of Eden Studios, first displaying this intention with the RPG All Flesh Must Be Eaten (2000), written by Vasilakos and Christopher Shy with Jurkat as editor. Jurkat was one of the contributors to The Kid's Colouring Book o Critters.

Eden announced a tabletop game version of City of Heroes in early 2005, and Jurkat was to write the City of Heroes Registration Manual, the core volume of the game. Jurkat ended his part ownership in Eden Studios in 2005 and stopped working for the company in 2006, working instead as a freelance editor for companies such as Margaret Weis Productions and Wizards of the Coast. His Dungeons & Dragons design work includes the Magic Item Compendium (2007) and Player's Option: Heroes of Shadow (2011).
