= R. Hyrum Savage =

American role-playing game designer

R. Hyrum Savage is an RPG designer and brand manager whose design credits include Diomin and Forbidden Kingdoms.

== Career ==
R. Hyrum Savage has worked for Disney Interactive, FreePC, and eMachines. Savage started the California-based OtherWorld Creations (OWC) with Dave Webb, as one of the many publishers that got started in role-playing games to publish material for the d20 System. The company began publication with Diomin (2000), which had originally been designed for GURPS but the availability of d20 licensing persuaded Savage and friends Chad Cunningham and Chris Miller to convert the setting to d20 instead. Savage was also one of the creators behind Forbidden Kingdoms. In 2004 Savage went to work for Upper Deck Entertainment, when production for OtherWorld Creations stopped because both their distributor Wizard's Attic and the d20 market collapsed. Savage brought OtherWorld Creations back in 2006 when he saw another licensing opportunity similar to the OGL. In 2007, Savage was able to start a subsidiary of OtherWorld Creations with Stan Brown that they called Super Genius Games. Savage was the product manager for hobby games, as well as the Marvel and DC Comics trading card games, at Upper Deck. Savage left Upper Deck in 2009 and was then able to spend more of his time on Super Genius Games.

Until May 2008 he was the brand manager for the New Hobby Games division at Upper Deck Entertainment, as well as the brand manager for the Vs. System and all other superhero product lines including the Marvel Masterpieces trading card brand and Marvel Ultimate Battles TCG.

He accepted a new position as marketing manager at Paizo Publishing in September, 2010. Later, he was laid off by the company and took up another job at Glu Mobile. He left the company in late 2012 and has been able to focus on Super Genius along with any side jobs he can find.

== Game design/writing ==
- Diomin core book - Diomin (OWC 2000)
- Into the Darkness - Diomin (OWC 2001)
- Acceptance of Fate - Diomin (OWC 2001)
- Forbidden Kingdoms Master Codex - d20 system and d20 Modern (OWC 2002)
- Strike Force 7 - Spycraft (OWC 2003)
- Danger in the City of Immer - Diomin (OWC 2004)
- Outpost Qether - RuneQuest (OWC 2006)
- Danger in the City of Immer - RuneQuest (OWC 2006)
- Mysterious City of Jershon - RuneQuest (OWC 2007)
- Taint and Sanity - RuneQuest (OWC 2007)
- The Forgotten Tomb of Felgar the Goblin King - various (SGG 2008)
- The Kobold Death maze - various (SGG 2008)
- Murder of Crows - Call of Cthulhu (SGG 2008)
- The Doom from Below - Call of Cthulhu (SGG 2008)
- Midnight Harvest - Call of Cthulhu (SGG 2008)
