= List of Buffyverse media =

List of media associated with the Buffyverse

The Buffyverse is a media franchise and shared fictional universe centred around the television shows Buffy the Vampire Slayer and Angel.

The franchise has been developed into a number of canonical and non-canonical comics, novels, games, and audio series.

== Film ==
Buffy the Vampire Slayer is a 1992 film that serves as the source material for the Buffy the Vampire Slayer franchise. It stars Kristy Swanson as Buffy Summers, a teenage vampire slayer. It was later developed into the television show of the same name, and remains non-canonical to the rest of the franchise.

== Television ==
=== Buffy the Vampire Slayer (1997-2003; 144 episodes) ===
Season	Episodes	Originally released		
Season	Episodes	First released	Last released	Network
1	12	March 10, 1997	June 2, 1997	The WB
2	22	September 15, 1997	May 19, 1998	The WB
3	22	September 29, 1998	September 21, 1999	The WB
4	22	October 5, 1999	May 23, 2000	The WB
5	22	September 26, 2000	May 22, 2001	The WB
6	22	October 2, 2001	May 21, 2002	UPN
7	22	September 24, 2002	May 20, 2003	UPN

=== Angel (1999-2004; 110 episodes) ===
Season	Episodes	Originally released	
Season	Episodes	First released	Last released
1	22	October 5, 1999	May 23, 2000
2	22	September 26, 2000	May 22, 2001
3	22	September 24, 2001	May 20, 2002
4	22	October 6, 2002	May 7, 2003
5	22	October 1, 2003	May 19, 2004

== Novels ==
=== Simon & Schuster ===
Simon & Schuster published Buffyverse books under their imprints Pocket Books, Simon Pulse, and Simon Spotlight Entertainment. They published 45 original solo Buffy novels from 1997 to 2007, as well as 14 novelizations of episodes and a 1999 tie-in Sunnydale High Yearbook. They published 25 Angel solo novels, 4 crossover novels, and also published 7 non-canon mini-series;

- The Gatekeeper Trilogy (1999; 3 novels)
- The Lost Slayer (2001; 4 novels)
- Unseen (2001 crossover; 3 novels)
- Tales of the Slayer (2001–2004; 4 volumes) (Note: Not to be confused with the canon comic Tales of the Slayers)
- Wicked Willow (2004; 3 novels)
- Stake Your Destiny (2005; 4 novels)
- Slayer (2019–2020; 2 novels)

Simon & Schuster also published reference books, including;

- The Watcher's Guide (1998–2017; 4 volumes)
- Pop Quiz (1999)
- The Monster Book (2000)
- The Casefiles (2002–2004; 2 volumes)
- The Quotable Slayer (2005)
- Slayer Stats (2018)

=== Disney Entertainment ===
After Disney Entertainment acquired Buffy's parent company 20th Century Studios in 2019, the publishing license is currently under Disney's Hyperion Avenue Books, which has published new non-canon Buffy novels since 2022. These include;

- Bloody Fool for Love (2022) - ISBN 9781368071987
- Big Bad: A Novel (2022) - ISBN 9781368075466
- The Bewitching Hour (2023) - ISBN 9781368075459
- In Every Generation Trilogy (by Kendare Blake)
  - In Every Generation (2022) – ISBN 9781368075022
  - One Girl in All the World (2023) – ISBN 9781368075077
  - Against the Darkness (2024) - ISBN 9781368075084
- The Power of Friendship (2025) (Note: Picture book) - ISBN 9780736444705

=== Others ===
- Scholastic published 3 novelizations of episodes.
- Dark Horse published the illustrated Creatures of Habit (2002) - ISBN 1569715637.
- Titan Books published Demons of the Hellmouth: A Guide for Slayers by Rupert Giles (2015) guidebook. - ISBN 9781783293384.
- Insight Editions has published;
  - Sunnydale High Hardcover Ruled Journal (2017) - ISBN 9781683830955
  - Vampyr Hardcover Ruled Journal (2017) - ISBN 9781683830573
  - The Official Grimoire: A Magickal History of Sunnydale (2017) - ISBN 9781683830689
  - Buffy the Vampire Slayer: Vampyr Stationery Set (2017) - ISBN 9781683830610
  - Slayer Stats: The Complete Infographic Guide to All Things Buffy (2018) - ISBN 9781683830566
  - Buffy the Vampire Slayer Tarot Deck and Guidebook (2023) - ISBN 9781647228514
  - Recipes from Sunnydale: Sink Your Teeth Into the Hellmouth's Tastiest Bites (upcoming)
- Harper Design published Buffy the Vampire Slayer Encyclopedia: Your Ultimate Guide to the Buffyverse (2017) - ISBN 9780062659668
- Quirk Books published Buffy the Vampire Slayer: A Picture Book (2018).

== Comic books ==
=== Canon ===
Dark Horse Comics (1998–2018)

- The Origin (1999 miniseries; 3 issues)
- Fray (2001–2003; 8 issues)
- Tales
  - Tales of the Slayers (one-shot)
  - Tales of the Vampires (2003–2004; 5 issues)
- Season Eight (2007–2011; 40 issues and 3 one-shots)
- Season Nine (2011–2013; 25 issues)
  - Angel and Faith (2011–2013; 25 issues)
  - Spike: A Dark Place (2012–2013; 5 issues)
  - Willow: Wonderland (2012–2013; 5 issues)
- Season Ten (2014–2016; 30 issues)
  - Angel and Faith (2014–2016; 25 issues)
- Season Eleven (2016–2018; 12 issues)
  - Angel (2017: 12 issues)
  - Giles: Girl Blue (2018; 4 issues)
- Season Twelve (2018; 4 issues)

IDW Publishing

- Angel: After the Fall (2007–2011; 44 issues and 8 extras)
  - Spike: After the Fall (2008; 4 issues)
- Spike (2010–2011; 8 issues)

=== Non-Canon ===
Dark Horse Comics

- Buffy the Vampire Slayer (1998–2003; 63 issues and 12 specials)
  - Angel: The Hollower (1999; 3 issues)
  - Spike and Dru (1999–2001; 3 one-shots)
  - Oz (2001; 3 issues)
  - Haunted (2001–2002; 5 issues)
  - Willow & Tara: WannaBlessedBe (2001 one-shot)
  - Willow & Tara: Wilderness (2002; 2 issues)
- Angel (1999–2001; 17 issues)
  - TV Guide Ultimate Cable: Point of Order (1999)
  - Dark Horse Presents: Lovely, Dark and Deep (2000; #153-155)
  - Dark Horse Extra: The Nepalese Switcheroo (2000; #25-28)
- Buffy: The High School Years (2016–2017; 3 graphic novels)

IDW Publishing

- Angel
  - Spike
    - Spike vs. Dracula (2006; 5 issues)
    - Spike: Asylum (2006–2007; 4 issues)
    - Spike: Shadow Puppets (2007; 4 issues)
    - Spike: The Devil You Know (2010; 4 issues)
  - Mini-series (2005–2010)
    - The Curse (2005; 5 issues)
    - Old Friends (2005–2006; 5 issues)
    - Auld Lang Syne (2006–2007; 5 issues)
    - Smile Time (2008–2009; 3 issues)
    - Not Fade Away (2009; 3 issues)
    - Blood & Trenches (2009; 4 issues)
    - Only Human (2009; 5 issues)
    - A Hole in the World (2009–2010; 5 issues)
    - Barbary Coast (2010; 3 issues)
    - The Devil You Know (2010; 4 issues)
    - Illyra: Haunted (2010–2011; 4 issues)

Boom! Studios - an alternative canon

- Buffy the Vampire Slayer (2019-; 34 issues and 8 one-shots)
  - Angel (2019; 8 issues)
  - Angel + Spike (2019–2020; 17 issues)
  - Hellmouth (2019–2020; 5 issues)
  - Willow (2020; 5 issues)
  - Buffy the Last Vampire Slayer (2021 miniseries; 4 issues)
  - Angel (2022; 8 issues)
  - The Vampire Slayer (2022–2023; 16 issues)
  - Buffy the Last Vampire Slayer (2023 continuation; 5 issues)

=== Other ===
- The Ultimate Buffy the Vampire Slayer: The Gift (2005; graphic novel adaptation) (TokyoPop)
- Buffy the Vampire Slayer (2018–2019; 2 graphic novels) (Little, Brown and Company)

== Magazines ==
Two dedicated magazines were created for the Buffyverse. The first Buffy the Vampire Slayer began in 1999, and Angel began in 2003. Angel ran for 24 issues before being combined with the Buffy the Vampire slayer magazine in 2005 on its 76th issue. The magazine would continue until 2007, totaling 118 issues.

- Buffy the Vampire Slayer (1999–2007; 118 issues + specials)
  - Angel magazine (2003–2005; 24 issues)

== Audio series ==
Slayers: A Buffyverse Story is a 2023, 9 episode non-canon audio series by Audible. The series was written by Amber Benson and Christopher Golden, and follows a new slayer known as Indira (Layla DeLeon Hayes). It features former Buffyverse stars Cordelia (Charisma Carpenter), Drusilla (Juliet Landau), Clem (James Leery), Giles (Anthony Head), Tara (Amber Benson), Anya (Emma Caulfield), and Spike (James Marsters) as the narrator.

== Video games ==
There are six video game adaptations of the television series Buffy the Vampire Slayer that have been released. Although having been licensed as Buffy the Vampire Slayer merchandise, these games and spin-offs are generally not considered as part of the Buffyverse canon.

Game	Details
Buffy the Vampire Slayer Original release date(s): NA: September 19, 2000; EU: November 10, 2000	Release years by system: 2000 – Game Boy Color
Buffy the Vampire Slayer Original release date(s): NA: August 19, 2002; EU: September 13, 2002	Release years by system: 2002 – Xbox
Buffy the Vampire Slayer: Wrath of the Darkhul King Original release date(s): NA: June 24, 2003; EU: June 27, 2003	Release years by system: 2003 – Game Boy Advance
Buffy the Vampire Slayer: Chaos Bleeds Original release date(s): NA: August 26, 2003; EU: October 24, 2003	Release years by system: 2003 – GameCube, PlayStation 2, Xbox
Buffy the Vampire Slayer: The Quest for Oz Original release date(s): NA: 2004	Release years by system: 2004 – Mobile
Buffy the Vampire Slayer: The Quest for Oz Original release date(s): NA: 2004	Notes: Buffy the Vampire Slayer: The Quest for Oz is a platform game developed by Indiagames for the mobile phone. Released in 2004, it is the fifth video game and first mobile game in the franchise. It takes Buffy on a mission to rescue Oz through five levels of Drusilla's mansion.
Buffy the Vampire Slayer: Sacrifice Original release date(s): EU: March 6, 2009; AU: June 4, 2009	Release years by system: 2009 – Nintendo DS
Buffy the Vampire Slayer: Sacrifice Original release date(s): EU: March 6, 2009; AU: June 4, 2009	Notes: Buffy the Vampire Slayer: Sacrifice is a beat 'em up horror video game developed by Romanian developer Beast Studios for the Nintendo DS. It released in March 2009. The game mixes beat 'em up and first-person shooter elements. Rob Des Hotel, one of the television show's writers, wrote the story for the game, which is set after the seventh season.

== Other games ==
=== Buffyverse role-playing games ===
Two complementary, officially licensed role-playing games (RPGs) published by Eden Studios, Inc.. Both games use a streamlined (or Cinematic) version of Eden Studios' popular Unisystem game engine. In the Buffyverse games, players are able to take on the roles of characters from their respective television series or create wholly original characters as they and their group see fit, effectively building their own Buffyverse series in the process.

- Buffy the Vampire Slayer Roleplaying Game (2002)
- Angel Roleplaying Game (2003)

=== Card games ===
- Buffy the Vampire Slayer Collectible Card Game (2001)
- Top Trumps Buffy the Vampire Slayer and Angel (both 2001)
- Buffy the Vampire Slayer Tarot Deck and Guidebook (2023)

=== Board Games ===
- Chess set (2000; Trademark Toys)
- Buffy the Vampire Slayer: The Game (2000; Hasbro)
- Buffy the Vampire Slayer and Angel board games (2000/2001; Susan Prescot Games)
- Buffy the Vampire Slayer: The Board Game (2016; Jasco Games )
- Unmatched: Buffy the Vampire Slayer (2020; Mondo)

== Undeveloped ==
The original Buffy the Vampire Slayer pilot was unaired, and had a number of differences from the released version.

A number of proposed television shows remained undeveloped, including Buffy: The Animated Series, Faith, Ripper, Slayer School, and a Spike film. A sequel show titled Buffy the Vampire Slayer: New Sunnydale was set to release in 2026, but was cancelled.

== See also ==
- Buffyverse canon
- Buffy the Vampire Slayer in popular culture
- Unofficial Buffy the Vampire Slayer productions
