= Ed Healy =

Game designer

- Occupations: Game designer, Marketing
- Employer: Gamerati
- Website: edhealy.com

Edward P. Healy is a game designer who has worked primarily on role-playing games. He co-founded Eden Studios.

== Career ==
George Vasilakos, Alex Jurkat, and investor Ed Healy announced on July 4, 1997 their formation of gaming company Eden Studios; they also obtained the rights to Conspiracy X to continue the line. Healy had suggested the name "Eden" because the group wanted to begin their paradise job. Healy was still in college when Eden was founded. Healy was responsible for publishing All Flesh Must Be Eaten through Eden. Healy had to divest himself of ownership in Eden in 1997 when he was hired as a staff accountant at Deloitte & Touche, although he was still able to continue with game design.

Healy discovered that the dice system used in the role-playing game Sorcerer by Ron Edwards was very similar to a mechanic for dice he was working on that was also similar to what was used in Risk so Healy abandoned that work. Healy was a business-minded gamer interested in independent role-playing games, and corresponded with Edwards via phone and e-mail after buying a copy of Sorcerer. Healy became friends with Edwards, and he joined the Gaming Outpost designer community. Healy recalled that the Gaming Outpost forums "had the vibe of a private club, not in an exclusionary way but just like dudes hanging out talking" like a sort of "town square" for people to discuss game design. The owners of Gaming Outpost were looking for help with business development, so they asked Healy soon after he joined and he suggested starting a network of cobranded role-playing sites to feed into Gaming Outpost. Bill Walton soon after brought on his role-playing advocacy site The Escapist, and Healy created a site with Edwards in December 1999 called Hephaestus's Forge, the "Internet Home of Indie Roleplaying Games". Healy designed the pages for Hephaestus' Forge, named for the Greek god of crafting, and arranged for hosting the site while intending that game discussion would happen on the Gaming Outpost forums. Healy and Edwards used Hephastus' Forge to support independent game ownership and publication, rather than corporate ownership. Healey continued with the Hephaestus's Forge until 2001. He was one of the founders of the new iteration of "The Forge" in 2001.

Healy joined the United States Army after the September 11 attacks and was deployed in Iraq, but left the army four years later when he started a family. Healy began doing advertising work while he was still in Iraq to assist Wolfgang Baur of Kobold Press, and joined as a game promoter in 2008.

Healy owns and operates the game marketing and promotions company Gamerati, based in DuPont, Washington. Healy founded Gamerati in June 2007.

Healy started the role-playing game podcast Atomic Array, with its first episode on July 4, 2008. In 2010, he won a Gold ENNIE Award for Atomic Array.

Healy was one of the co-authors on the role-playing game supplement PC Pearls (2008) from Goodman Games.
