= Aldo Ghiozzi =

Game wholesaler

- Occupation: Game wholesaler
- Spouse: Alexandra

Aldo A. Ghiozzi is a game wholesaler who has been involved primarily with role-playing games. He was also a candidate for mayor of Brentwood, California in 2016 and has volunteered with the town's chamber of commerce.

== Career ==
Aldo Ghiozzi is the owner of Wingnut Games. Ghiozzi designed the caveman role-playing game Og which Wingnut Games published in 1995. Ghiozzi and Matt Stipicevich designed the Battle Cattle miniatures game, which Wingnut Games published in 1996.

Ghiozzi became a resident of Brentwood, California around the year 2000 with his wholesale card and board game business. Ghiozzi is the owner of the personal consulting firm Impressions Advertising & Marketing. Ghiozzi founded Impressions in 2000. Ghozzi and Ben Wise were guests of honor at the 2001 Ben Con (short for "Benefit Convention") in Denver.

Wingnut Games was one of the consolidation clients for Wizard's Attic, and in 2002 the business for Wizard's Attic was beginning to falter and clients such as Ghiozzi were not receiving all of their payments. Wizard's Attic was looking to leave the consolidation business, so Rob Stone of Citizen Games convinced Ghiozzi to move his small company into the games field. Impressions was using Wizard's Attic for its own base to perform consolidation operations, so Eric Rowe made a corner of the Wizard's Attic warehouse strictly for the use of shipping and receiving the products of Ghiozzi and his clients Citizen Games, Troll Lord Games and Wingnut Games. Impressions obtained eight more clients from the 2002 GAMA Trade Show, even though Ghiozzi had not decided on a business plan yet. Wizard's Attic had started shutting down all business except for fulfilment by the end of the year, so Eric Rowe gave 80 Wizard's Attic consolidation clients to Ghiozzi. Ghiozzi ended business with about half of the less-productive customers throughout the next year, and was able to make a successful business out of the other 40 customers. As its business kept failing in 2003 Wizard's Attic was going to be locked out of its last warehouse in Kentucky with the product inside, so Ghiozzi secured an arrangement with Chessex to become the new shipper for Impressions, and he flew to Kentucky to recover nine palettes full of merchandise.

Ghoizzi chairs the Contra Costa Wine, Grape, and Olive Growers Association and publishes the magazine Wine ... Oh! which focuses on wine in Contra Costa, California.

Ghiozzi has volunteered for the Chamber of Commerce in Brentwood with a focus on tourism and created the city slogan "Experience Brentwood", and ran for mayor of Brentwood in 2016 as a write-in candidate. The city council of Brentwood had approved a pay raise for the position of mayor, and Ghiozzi stated that if he won he would donate his paychecks to nonprofits.

Flat River Group took ownership of Impressions in 2018. Ghiozzi became the co-owner and executive director of KublaCon game convention. Ghiozzi stayed in the Flat River Group hobby department as part of the Impressions Game Distribution Services until he left in January 2023. Ghiozzi was soon after elected to take over the open seat of wholesale director for Gama, and his term would last until March 24, 2024.
