= Zombie Smackdown! =

Zombie Smackdown! is a 2004 role-playing game supplement published by Eden Studios for All Flesh Must Be Eaten.

== Contents ==
Zombie Smackdown! is a supplement in which wrestling-themed rules, archetypes, settings, and styles are added for high-impact undead showdowns.

== Reviews ==
- Pyramid
- Backstab #49
