= Enter the Zombie =

Enter the Zombie is a 2002 role-playing game supplement published by Eden Studios for All Flesh Must Be Eaten.

== Contents ==
Enter the Zombie is a supplement in which the Hong Kong action film genre is mixed with the zombie genre.

== Reviews ==
- Pyramid
- Backstab
