= The Magic Box (Buffy the Vampire Slayer Roleplaying Game) =

The Magic Box is a 2003 role-playing game supplement published by Eden Studios for Buffy the Vampire Slayer Roleplaying Game.

== Contents ==
The Magic Box is a supplement in which a comprehensive guide to magic, psychic powers, and super‑science, expands spell and item creation, adds new archetypes, rituals, organizations, and rules for mystical backlash, and provides a full adventure plus updated NPC stats in the Buffyverse.

== Reviews ==
- Pyramid
- SF Site
- Realms of Fantasy
