= Vasilakos =

Vasilakos (Greek: Βασιλάκος) is a Greek surname. Notable people with the surname include:

- Charilaos Vasilakos (1875–1964), Greek athlete
- George Vasilakos, American graphic designer
- Vasilios Vasilakos (born 1960), Greek footballer
