= Forbidden Kingdoms =

Role-playing game setting

- Forbidden Kingdoms Master Codex cover
- Designers: R. Hyrum Savage & Dave Webb
- Publishers: OtherWorld Creations
- Publication: 2001 (Forbidden Kingdoms), 2006 (Forbidden Kingdoms: Modern)
- Genres: alternate history, alternate reality, fantasy, horror, pulp, speculation
- Systems: d20 System, d20 Modern, Dungeons & Dragons variant

Forbidden Kingdoms is a pulp magazine-inspired setting for Dungeons & Dragons and d20 Modern, written by R. Hyrum Savage and Dave Webb, and published by OtherWorld Creations.

Forbidden Kingdoms is set on an alternate history Earth, between the years 1889 and 1939. The setting includes rules for magic, psionics and martial arts, as well as weird science.
