= Wonders Out of Time =

Role-playing game adventure

Wonders Out of Time is a 2001 role-playing game adventure published by Eden Studios, under its Odyssey imprint.

== Plot summary ==
Wonders Out of Time is an adventure in which a series of short adventures or vignettes can be used one at a time or together.

== Publication history ==
Shannon Appelcline noted that the Eden Odyssey adventure series was composed of "vignette books" with short adventures beginning with Akrasia: Thief of Time (2001), and that although a similar design had been used previously, "the Eden Odyssey adventures were some of the few to really approach the style of adventure design consistently". Kevin Wilson's Wonders Out of Time was the second vignette book released in the series, in 2001. It was followed by C. J. Carella's Secret of the Ancients in 2003.

== Reviews ==
- Pyramid
- Backstab (as "Merveilles des Anciens")
- Gaming Frontiers (Volume 1 - 2002)
- Pyramid
