= Slayer's Handbook =

Role-playing game supplement

Slayer's Handbook is a 2002 role-playing game supplement published by Eden Studios for Buffy the Vampire Slayer Roleplaying Game.

== Contents ==
Slayer's Handbook is a supplement in which Slayer lore, character options, alternative settings, and ready‑to‑play adventures are explored, giving both players and gamemasters what they need to run Slayer‑focused campaigns.

== Reviews ==
- Pyramid
- Realms of Fantasy
- Legions Realm Monthly (Issue 10 - Jun 2003)
