= Abomination Codex =

Role-playing game supplement

Abomination Codex is a 2000 role-playing game supplement published by Eden Studios for CJ Carella's WitchCraft.

== Contents ==
Abomination Codex is a supplement in which the Feral character type is introduced, along with five new associations that characters can join.

== Reviews ==
- Pyramid
- Backstab (as "Mystery Codex 2, le retour")
