= Buffy the Vampire Slayer Director's Screen =

Buffy the Vampire Slayer Director's Screen is a 2002 role-playing game supplement published by Eden Studios for Buffy the Vampire Slayer Roleplaying Game.

== Contents ==
Buffy the Vampire Slayer Director's Screen is a supplement in which a four‑panel gamemaster's screen includes charts and tables, accompanied by a booklet offering session‑running advice and three ready‑to‑run episodes.

== Reviews ==
- Pyramid
- Realms of Fantasy
