= Diomin =

2000 dark fantasy role-playing game

- Designers: R. Hyrum Savage
- Publishers: OtherWorld Creations
- Publication: 2000; 26 years ago
- Genres: Dark fantasy
- Systems: d20 System, RuneQuest

Diomin is a dark fantasy role-playing game, designed by R. Hyrum Savage and published by OtherWorld Creations.

== History ==
Diomin was a fantasy setting which was originally designed for GURPS, but after starting RPG publisher OtherWorld Creations (OWC) during the d20 boom, R. Hyrum Savage, Chad Cunningham and Chris Miller converted Diomin to d20 and the company released it in 2000. OWC supported Diomin with publications through 2003, but production halted soon after with the crash of the d20 market. Savage brought back OWC and Diominin 2006 with Mongoose Publishing's Open Gaming License for RuneQuest. New books that were mostly released as PDFs.

== Races ==
- Arak: An insular people with blue skin, black hair, and reddish eyes. Tribal and proud.
- Gadianti: A race of bipedal catpeople marked as jaguars or tigers. One of the two main "villain races" of Diomin (the other being the Zeredites) who obey Akish, one of Diomin's Lords of Darkness.
- Gnolaum: A seafaring and long-lived race whose culture resembles that of feudal Japan.
- Hearthom: Mysterious beings who resemble living statues (with hair). Their origins are hidden and while there are male and female Hearthom, there seems to be an utter lack of Hearthom children.
- Humans (see Tirasim and Zeredites) They who are divided into two cultures: the good-leaning Tirasim and the evil-leaning Zeredite.s Both cultures of humans have practices that resemble those of the ancient Greeks (Tirasim) and Sumerians (Zeredites).
  - Tirasim are descendants of the Zeredites who fled East to found a new nation at the behest of Barak, chief deity of the Warriors of Light.
  - Zeredites were outcasts from the Arak during the Gods War and were the first humans on Diomin.

== Classes ==
With the sole exception of the Rogue, all of the core D&D base classes are modified in the d20 edition of Diomin, if only in terms of cultural availability. The Paladin class received the most in terms of game mechanic changes, followed by the Wizard. Also introduced is the Shaman class and Spirit Magic. The RuneQuest system does not use character classes.

== Gods ==
The Warriors of Light - Those who serve the One

- Barak – God of Law, Good, Water and Protection. He is normally depicted as a tall man in fine, flowing robes, with grayish-white shoulder-length hair and blue eyes. His holy symbol is the compass and carpenters square.
- Ashima – Goddess of War, Law, and Strength. She is a tall woman, with raven colored hair and emerald eyes. She is always shown wearing her armor and is worshipped as the goddess of all just and honorable warriors. Her holy symbol is a shield overlaid with a sword.
- Chemosh – God of Knowledge, Magic, and Good. He is a man of average height with short blond hair and blue eyes. He is the god of scholars and students of the arcane. His holy symbol is an open book with a bookmark running down the left page.
- Sepharvaim – God of Good, Healing, and Protection. This god is always portrayed in his white robes, the hood drawn over his face. Those whose only desire is to serve the helpless, poor, needy, and good worship him. His holy symbol is a serpent entwined around a staff.

The Lords of Darkness - Those who serve the Liberator

- Akish – Goddess of Chaos, Evil, and Destruction. She is depicted as a dangerously beautiful woman with blonde hair, green eyes, and pale skin. Among her chief worshippers, the Gadianti, she is known as “the Mother” and appears to them as a black haired Gadianti with glowing red eyes. She is the goddess of all that is evil and is the first follower that Cedron brought to his side. Her holy symbol is a hooded lantern.
- Rimmon – God of War, Destruction, and Chaos. He is a giant, over nine feet tall, with long greasy hair, and one blue eye, and one green eye. His right hand is missing and they tell stories of the battle how Ashima severed it. Only treacherous and dishonorable warriors worship him. His holy symbol is three shrunken heads tied together by the hair.
- Molech – God of Law, Knowledge, Death, and Magic. He is an old, cruel man with gray hair and brown, wild-looking eyes. He is the god of dark magic, torture, and those who wish for knowledge at any price. His symbol is the pentagram.
- Ashtoreth – Goddess of Chaos, Evil, and Healing. She is an old crone with long white hair and blue eyes. Those who seek to overthrow the world and plunge it into chaos worship her. Her holy symbol is a skull with the lower jaw gone.

Children of the Vineyard - Those who serve only themselves

- Tartak – God of Trickery, Luck, and Chaos. Tartak is also the chief god of the Hearthom. He is a fat, balding man with brown hair and eyes. He is depicted as being happy, but there is a glint of something more in his eyes. Additionally, he is also depicted as a rotund Hearthom made of granite. Thieves, gamblers, and lawyers worship him. His holy symbol is a jewel of any kind dedicated to him at a temple.
- Succoth-Benath – Goddess of Earth, Chaos, Knowledge. She is always seen as a beautiful woman, either young and fresh or older and seductive. She has red hair and blue eyes. She is the goddess of those who only seek after the joys of the flesh. Her symbol is the rose.
- Nebo – God of Plant, Animal, Knowledge, and Fire. He is an old looking man with gray hair and brown eyes. He was once a part of the Warriors of Light but grew tired of the conflict and now only wishes to be left alone with his creations. His symbol is the acorn.
- Kalaratri – Goddess of Destruction, Trickery, and Chaos. She is the epitome of the Children of the Vineyard. She dwells in the Spirit Realm and is also known as the “Eater of Souls”. It is said that she is the cause of all random acts of violence, destruction, or chaos. She is also the goddess of the berserk, obsessed, and crazed. She has no holy symbol.

== Reviews ==
- Backstab #27

== Publications ==
- Diomin by R. Hyrum Savage, Chad Cunningham, Christopher T. Miller (OtherWorld Creations, 2000)
- Diomin Worldbook by R. Hyrum Savage, Chad Cunningham, Christopher T. Miller (OtherWorld Creations, 2000)
- Into the Darkness by R. Hyrum Savage (OtherWorld Creations, 2001)
- State of the Nations Volume One: The Gadianti & Hearthom by Rob Holmes, James Kovach, & Dave Webb (OtherWorld Creations, 2001)
- Acceptance of Fate by Chad Justice and R. Hyrum Savage (OtherWorld Creations, 2002)
- The Shaman by R. Hyrum Savage (OtherWorld Creations, 2006)
