= Ghosts of Albion Roleplaying Game =

- Ghosts of Albion Corebook cover.
- Designers: Timothy S. Brannan
- Publishers: Eden Studios, Inc.
- Publication: 2008/2011
- Genres: Action/Adventure, Horror, Drama, Victorian
- Systems: Unisystem

The Ghosts of Albion Roleplaying Game is a role-playing game published by Eden Studios, Inc. in 2008.

== Description ==
The Ghosts of Albion Roleplaying Game is based on the animated BBCi films Ghosts of Albion created by Christopher Golden and Amber Benson.

The same Cinematic Unisystem used in the Buffy the Vampire Slayer RPG was adopted for use in Ghosts of Albion.

== Publication history ==
The Ghosts of Albion Roleplaying Game was published by Eden Studios, Inc. in 2008.

On June 28, 2007, Eden Studios released the "quick start" version of the Ghosts of Albion RPG. This free PDF, written by Timothy S. Brannan and Garner Johnson is designed to introduce players to the Ghosts of Albion RPG. The PDF version of the complete RPG was published in August 2008 and is available from the Eden Studios website for the game. The print version of the RPG, originally due in September 2008, was released in December 2011. Created by Amber Benson and Christopher Golden and written by Timothy S. Brannan.

== Reception ==
Ghosts of Albion has received a number of positive reviews. It is one of only a couple of games to get two positive reviews from Game Geeks. Wiegel stated that "Ghosts of Albion is "The best modern urban fantasy game you can use." and "Do you need Ghosts of Albion? Yes you do."

Ghosts of Albion has also received positive reviews from RPGNet reviewer Dan Davenport, giving it 5/5 for Style and 5/5 for Substance.

In November 2014, it has a 4.8 average rating, out of 5, from all reviewers on DriveThruRPG/RPGNow.
