= Gatecrasher (role-playing game) =

Tabletop role-playing game

- Gatcrasher Rules Booklet cover
- Designers: Michael W. Lucas
- Publishers: Grey Ghost Press
- Genres: Science fantasy
- Systems: Fudge rules

Gatecrasher is a light-hearted science fantasy role-playing game published by Grey Ghost Press in 1996.

== Description ==
Gatecrasher is a role-playing game set in the 24th century, where a transdimensional gate has been opened, allowing magic into the world. The game is more light-hearted than dark, featuring monsters like "Golf Balls from Hell" and "Killer Pancakes", and deep space asteroids named Cheesers and This Stinking Rock.

== Publication history ==
Gatecrasher was written by Michael Lucas and published in 1996 by Grey Ghost Press. A revised second edition was published the following year, a 208-page softcover book designed again by Michael Lucas.

== Gameplay ==
Gatecrasher uses the Fudge rules.

=== Character generation ===
Players can create just about any kind of creature as their character, including an angel, an orc, or a wyvern. The player assigns a fixed number of levels (Terrible, Poor, Mediocre, Fair, Good, Great, Superb) to a variety of attributes, skills and powers, as well as adding extra enhancements such as extra eyes, limbs that can morph into tools or the ability to switch genders at will.

=== Task resolution ===
When a player wants a character to attempt a task, the referee decides on the relevant skill that needs to be checked and assigns a difficulty level (Good, Fair, Mediocre, Poor, etc.) to the task. The player rolls percentile dice, which generate a level step modifier of -4 to +4. This increases or decreases the level of the character's relevant skill by the indicated number of steps. (For example, if the character's relevant skill, Biology, has a skill rating of Poor, and the player's percentile dice roll indicates a step boost of +1, then the character's skill factor would increase one step up from Poor to Mediocre.) If the resultant modified skill equals or exceeds the difficulty level of the task, then the character succeeds.

== Reception ==
In the August 1997 edition of Dragon (Issue 238), Rick Swan reviewed the second edition, and called it "feather-light, as goofy as a day at the beach with the Smurfs." Swan liked the Fudge game system, but found the skill descriptions lacked helpful detail. "A veteran referee ought to abe able to fill in the blanks, but a novice might be in for some headaches." He also noted that the book did not contain any prepared scenarios, leaving it up to referees to create adventures from scratch. Swan gave it an average rating of 4 out of 6, concluding that despite its light-hearted approach, Gatecrasher was "a serious RPG, with the potential for exciting, involving adventures... If you’re in the market for a diversion, you could do worse than Gatecrasher."

== Reviews ==
- Shadis #10 (Dec., 1993)
