= Liber Bestarius: The Book of Beasts =

Liber Bestarius: The Book of Beasts is a 2002 role-playing game supplement for the d20 System and was published by Eden Studios.

== Contents ==
Liber Bestarius: The Book of Beasts contains a collection of creature descriptions, rules, and advice for game masters to add to their campaigns. The book also contains feats and player race conversions for each creature.

== Publication history ==
Shannon Appelcline noted that "Eden published only a half-dozen d20 books. Some of them, such as Liber Bestarius: The Book of Beasts (2002), Fields of Blood: The Book of War (2003) and Waysides: The Book of Taverns (2004), were not that different from what the smarter d20 publishers were putting out: they were dense supplementary books."

== Reviews ==
- Pyramid
- Backstab
- Legions Realm Monthly (Issue 5 - Jan 2003)
