= Ghosts of Albion =

Multi-platform fantasy series

Ghosts of Albion: Accursed by Amber Benson and Christopher Golden

Ghosts of Albion is a series of fantasy films, radio plays, books and role-playing games created by Amber Benson and Christopher Golden. Set in England, the storyline focuses on two siblings, Tamara and William Swift. The series started as an animated web movie series on the BBC's website and has now spawned two book adaptations and two novels and a role-playing game.

== List of works ==
- "Legacy" - drama, Macromedia Flash movie, online on the BBC site
- "Illusions" - story, text online on the BBC site (takes place before "Legacy")
- "Astray" - novella, paper book, text and RealPlayer audio version online on the BBC site
- "Embers" - drama, Macromedia Flash movie, online on the BBC site
- Initiation - anthology, paper book, by Subterranean Press, includes "Illusions", "Legacy" and "Embers"
- Accursed - novel, paper book, by Del Rey Books
- Witchery - novel, paper book (released late 09/2006), by Del Rey Books

== Plot ==
Ghosts of Albion: Witchery by Amber Benson and Christopher Golden

The story is about the Swift siblings, Tamara and William, the descendants of a wealthy early Victorian era London family. Tamara is a budding novelist (specializing in pulp horror novels, or "penny dreadfuls") and William is an architect's apprentice. One night in 1838 they are called to their ailing grandfather's bedside. There he tells them that while he may have seemed to be another stage magician, he is actually a mystical soldier who protects Albion, the mystical spirit of Britain. William and Tamara at first do not believe him, until he is suddenly slaughtered before their eyes by werewolves, and their father is possessed by a demon. Before dying, their grandfather had told the two that they are to carry on his legacy as protectors of Albion.

His words are soon confirmed when they are soon introduced to the ghosts of the poet Lord Byron (Joseph McFadden), Admiral Nelson (Anthony Daniels), and Queen Bodicea (Emma Samms), also mystical protectors of Albion. They all leave their home, now overrun with demons, to the house of Nigel Townshend (Paterson Joseph), an old friend of their father's (as well as Nelson's). There they study spells and prepare themselves to fend off certain doom from Britain—and the world.

== Role playing game ==
On June 28, 2007, Eden Studios released the "quick start" version of the Ghosts of Albion RPG. This free PDF, written by Timothy S. Brannan and Garner Johnson is designed to introduce players to the Ghosts of Albion RPG. The PDF version of the complete RPG was published in August 2008 and is available from the Eden Studios website for the game. The print version of the RPG, originally due in September 2008, was released in December 2011. Created by Amber Benson and Christopher Golden and written by Timothy S. Brannan.
