= Impressions Advertising & Marketing =

American role-playing game company

Impressions Advertising & Marketing is an American game company that produces and distributes role-playing games and game supplements.

== History ==
Aldo Ghiozzi is the owner of both Wingnut Games and the personal consulting firm Impressions Advertising & Marketing. Ghiozzi founded Impressions in 2000.

Wingnut Games was one of the consolidation clients for Wizard's Attic, and in 2002 the business for Wizard's Attic was beginning to falter and clients such as Ghiozzi were not receiving all of their payments. Wizard's Attic was looking to leave the consolidation business, so Rob Stone of Citizen Games convinced Ghiozzi to move his small company into the games field. Impressions was using Wizard's Attic for its own base to perform consolidation operations, so Eric Rowe made a corner of the Wizard's Attic warehouse strictly for the use of shipping and receiving the products of Ghiozzi and his clients Citizen Games, Troll Lord Games and Wingnut Games. Impressions obtained eight more clients from the 2002 GAMA Trade Show, even though Ghiozzi had not decided on a business plan yet. Wizard's Attic had started shutting down all business except for fulfilment by the end of the year, so Eric Rowe gave 80 Wizard's Attic consolidation clients to Ghiozzi. Ghiozzi ended business with about half of the less-productive customers throughout the next year, and was able to make a successful business out of the other 40 customers. As its business kept failing in 2003 Wizard's Attic was going to be locked out of its last warehouse in Kentucky with the product inside, so Ghiozzi secured an arrangement with Chessex to become the new shipper for Impressions, and he flew to Kentucky to recover nine palettes full of merchandise.

Impressions began doing business with toy and game distributor Flat River Group in roughly 2011. As of 2018 when Flat River Group took ownership, Impressions was the oldest remaining consolidator for the hobby games business, having more than 80 publishers for clients, such as Modiphius (including White Wolf), Jasco, Goodman Games, and Corvus Belli. Flat River ran Impressions as a business unit using its Fort Wayne, Indiana location and retaining its staff. Ghiozzi stayed in the Flat River Group hobby department as part of the Impressions Game Distribution Services until he left in January 2023; the hobby department for Flat River continues to consolidate process, price list, and catalog games.
