= Terra Primate =

Tabletop role-playing game

- Cover
- Designers: Al Bruno III, C.J. Carella, David F. Chapman, Patrick Sweeny
- Publishers: Eden Studios, Inc.
- Publication: 2002
- Genres: Sci-fi, Fantasy
- Systems: Unisystem

Terra Primate is an American role-playing game, designed by Patrick Sweeny, David F. Chapman, Al Bruno III and C.J. Carella, and published by Eden Studios, Inc.

Terra Primate (ISBN 978-1-891153-76-1) uses the Unisystem and is based on movies such as Planet of the Apes and the focus of the game is intelligent apes. The game has no specific setting, although, similar to "Deadworlds" in All Flesh Must Be Eaten, the core rulebook includes several so called "Apeworlds" (example settings).
