= GURPS War Against the Chtorr =

Tabletop role-playing game supplement

- GURPS War Against the Chtorr cover
- Designers: C. J. Carella
- Publishers: Steve Jackson Games
- Publication: 1993
- Genres: post-apocalypse warfare
- Systems: GURPS

GURPS War Against the Chtorr is a sourcebook for the GURPS role-playing game by C. J. Carella.

== Contents ==
It describes additional rules and a game setting based on the War Against the Chtorr science fiction novel series by David Gerrold, which depicts an Earth invaded by an alien ecology which threatens to not only destroy our own but change any human survivors into presentient food animals.

== Publication history ==
War Against the Chtorr was designed by C. J. Carella, and published by Steve Jackson Games. The book was published in 1993.

== Reception ==
Rick Swan reviewed War Against the Chtorr for Dragon magazine #203 (March 1994). Swan comments: "Intelligent worms the size of mini-vans invade the Earth in this first-rate supplement for the GURPS game. Based on the David Gerrold novels, War Against the Chtorr serves up all the raw material a malevolent referee needs to wipe out the human race. When the PCs think they've got a handle on the worms, see how they fare against nerve-burners, jellypigs, and pipe-cleaner bugs. Are you squirming yet?"
