= Misfit Studios =

Canadian role-playing game publisher

- Industry: small press
- Founded: 2003
- Founder: Steven Trustrum
- Headquarters: Toronto, Ontario, Canada

Misfit Studios Publishing is a Canadian small press business located in Toronto, Ontario, Canada. Founded in 2003 by Steven Trustrum, the company publishes a number of role-playing game products under limited and open license terms.

== History ==
Misfit Studios Publishing's founder says he began the company "after not being paid for his freelance writing one too many times." According to popular online role-playing game retailer, RPGNow, Misfit Studios' first published product was the Barbarian Hawkeye, in January 2005. According to its own online store, the company has since published over 150 role-playing game-related products.

From 2002, Christina Stiles worked as a freelancer with Eden Studios on a project called Odyssey Prime for her company, Bizarro Games; the game took years to complete, and by the time it was finally released four years later, Bizarro Games had merged into Misfit Studios, which released Odyssey Prime in PDF and POD. Eden Studios also released Enemies Archived (2006), a book of enemy encounters for Armageddon produced in PDF and POD in conjunction with Misfit Studios. Misfit Studios supported the Spirosblaak (2005) setting from Green Ronin Publishing's Mythic Vistas series.
