= Angel Roleplaying Game =

Tabletop horror role-playing game

Angel
- Limited Edition cover
- Designers: C. J. Carella
- Publishers: Eden Studios, Inc.
- Publication: 2003; 23 years ago
- Genres: Action/Adventure, Horror, Drama
- Systems: Unisystem
- Website: www.edenstudios.net/angelrpg.html
- ISBN: 1-891153-97-8

The Angel Roleplaying Game is a role-playing game published by Eden Studios, Inc. in 2003.

== Background ==
Based on the Angel TV series, this game uses Eden's Unisystem game system, originally used in CJ Carella's WitchCraft and All Flesh Must Be Eaten.

== Books and products ==
Only two books were published for the game.

=== Angel RPG: Corebook ===
(ISBN 1-891153-97-8) Though it is presented as a distinct line, the Angel Role-playing Game serves as a wholly compatible companion to the Buffy the Vampire Slayer roleplaying game. The ruleset is virtually identical, but the game offers an extensive point-based system which allows players and Directors to create their own supernatural package Qualities, thus producing characters ranging from psychics to demons. The book is also noteworthy for its introduction of organizational rules, allowing players and Directors to easily and quickly define the resources, influence and obligation associated with any given group - including, potentially, the player characters themselves.

Given the differences in both characters and setting, the Angel RPG describes that series' main cast and adversaries through the end of Season 3. Los Angeles is also presented, with the expected focus upon the fictional aspects of L.A. introduced on the show. Finally, the book includes the pregenerated adventure "Blood Brothers," which offers a plotline and general tone reminiscent of Angel's somewhat darker style. This is only the first part of a larger adventure, concluded in the Director's Screen (see below).

A Limited Edition (ISBN 1-891153-99-4) of this book was produced in 2003, featuring artwork by George Vasilakos. This printing was limited to 500 copies.

=== Angel RPG: Director's Screen ===
(ISBN 1-891153-98-6) This product includes a four-panel cardstock screen offering easy reference charts for the gamemaster (or "Director"), as well as a 32-page booklet containing tips, aids, additional charts, and "Blood Brothers, Part Two," the conclusion to the adventure presented in the Corebook.

=== Angel RPG: Character Journal ===
(ISBN 1-891153-58-7) Much like the Buffy Character Journal (see above), this 16-page booklet was expected to provide a vastly expanded character sheet allowing players to record a great deal of information. Like many of the Buffyverse supplements, it was never released due to the end of the Fox/Eden licensing agreement.

=== Angel RPG: Investigator's Casebook ===
(ISBN 1-891153-43-9) This supplement would have provided expanded rules and setting detail, an overview of the American legal system (appropriately enough, as the employees of Angel Investigations frequently butt heads with police officers, lawyers and others on the show), and a pregenerated adventure. Eden Studios will not release this product since the recent end of their license with Fox.

== Reception ==
The Angel role-playing game won the Origins Award for Best Roleplaying Game in its year of release.
