= Terra Incognita (role-playing game) =

Role-playing game

Terra Incognita is a role-playing game published by Grey Ghost Press in 2001.

== Description ==
Terra Incognita is a game based on the Fudge rules.

== Publication history ==
Terra Incognita was published by Grey Ghost Press in 2001.
