= GURPS Voodoo: The Shadow War =

Role-playing game supplement

Cover art by Tim Bradstreet, 1995

GURPS Voodoo: The Shadow War is a role-playing game supplement by C. J. Carella, published by Steve Jackson Games in 1995, about using voodoo magic in a GURPS (Generic Universal Role-Playing System) campaign.

== Contents ==
GURPS Voodoo: The Shadow War is a supplement that details the rules for ritual magic. The book presupposes the "Shadow War", a conflict between supernatural creatures seeking to destroy the world, and practitioners of the Voodoo tradition seeking to protect the world.

The book is divided into six chapters:

1. The Shadow War: An explanation of the war, and the warriors on both sides
2. Characters: How to generate characters for a GURPS campaign, and descriptions of voodoo powers.
3. Magic: Voodoo magic and rituals.
4. Entities : Voodoo spirits and deities, as well as supernatural creatures.
5. Lands of Voodoo
6. Campaigns: How to design a GURPS campaign that makes use of the information in this book.

== Publication history ==
In the 2014 book Designers & Dragons: The '80s, game historian Shannon Appelcline noted that Steve Jackson Games decided in the early 1990s to stop publishing adventures, and as a result "SJG was now putting out standalone GURPS books rather than the more complex tiered book lines. This included more historical subgenre books. Some, such as GURPS Camelot (1991) and GURPS China (1991), were clearly sub-subgenres, while others like GURPS Old West (1991) and GURPS Middle Ages I (1992) covered genres notably missing before this point."

GURPS Voodoo: The Shadow War is one such standalone book, a 128-page softcover book by C.J. Carella, with interior art by Shea Ryan, and cover art by Tim Bradstreet, published by SJG in 1995.

== Reception ==
In the October 1995 edition of Dragon (Issue #222), Rick Swan noted that this book followed in the footsteps of other supernatural role-playing games like Vampire: The Masquerade and Werewolf: The Apocalypse, but said, "For a zombie-come-lately, however, GURPS Voodoo has a lot going for it, due mostly to the smarts of designer C.J. Carella. Not only does Carella know GURPS like Bill Gates knows computer code [...] he has a knack for blending diverse source material into a seamless whole. It’s hard to tell where fact ends and fantasy begins, which adds to Voodoo’s unsettling tone." Swan did think that the lengthy history of voodoo might turn off some players, "But scholarly players should be impressed." However, Swan felt that the book's diverse subject matter and large geographical reach spread the material too thin, saying, "GURPS Voodoo needs less sprawl and more focus. I wish Carella would’ve confined the game to a small, self-contained area, like Haiti. It would’ve been easier to manage, and a lot more frightening; imagine being trapped on a tiny island teeming with spirits, clawing through steaming jungles while snarling zombies staggered from the brush. A claustrophobic setting such as this would’ve really turned up the tension." Nonetheless, Swan concluded by giving this book an excellent rating of 5 out of 6, saying, "The rich characters, eerie atmosphere, and slow-burn spiritualism add up to a riveting experience."

== Other reviews ==
- Rollespilsmagasinet Fønix Issue 11 (Dec/Jan 1995, p. 58, in Danish)
- Ringbote Issue 13 (July/Aug 1997, p. 72, in German)
- Envoyer #17
