= Armageddon: The End Times =

Tabletop horror role-playing game

Armageddon: The End Times is a role-playing game published by Myrmidon Press in 1997, with a second edition by Eden Studios, Inc. in 2003.

== Description ==
Armageddon: The End Times followed CJ Carella's WitchCraft as a potential future for the same setting. The first edition of Armageddon was published by Myrmidon Press in 1997; a second edition was published by Eden Studios, Inc. in 2003. It runs on the Unisystem, originally developed by C.J. Carella for the first edition of WitchCraft.

== Publication history ==
Roleplaying game designer C.J. Carella formed Myrmidon Press as a small independent games studio in 1993, publishing the games Manhunter (1993) and Cosmic Enforcers (1995). Myrmidon also produced Rifts: Manhunter (1994), which transported its Manhunter game to the Rifts universe and rules, owned Palladium Books.

After Palladium withdrew the Rifts license on 1996, Carella said the press would continue with Cosmic Encounters but would also focus on his forthcoming game, WitchCraft. Armageddon was a sequel to WitchCraft, published in 1997, which explored a possible future of that world. Its centerpiece was an apocalyptic war between Lovecraftian horrors, pagan gods, angels, and mythic creatures.

Later in 1997, Carella sought to sell the rights to his games to another company, having grown dissatisfied with the business side of Myrmidon Press. As fans of his prior work, Eden Studios' founders George Vasilakos and M. Alexander Jurkat initially discussed a possible Conspiracy X/WitchCraft crossover. Ultimately, however, they bought the rights to both games and Myrmidon Press closed down. In July 1998, they announced an exclusive license to the WitchCraft and Armageddon games, and established the Unisystem as their in-house rules system.

Eden published CJ Carella's WitchCraft in 1999, followed by Armageddon: The End Times in 2003. Eden Studios also released Enemies Archived (2006), a monster manual for Armageddon, in PDF and print on demand formats, in conjunction with Misfit Studios.

== Reception ==
In his review for Dragon Magazine, Rick Swan described the game's first edition as a "fascinating mess". He criticized the game's "Kitchen Sink Syndrome", similarity to the World of Darkness, and lack of an editor, but said the game nevertheless benefited from "a setting of breathtaking scope, unforgettable PCs, and Carella’s crisp, always entertaining text."

Dan Davenport at RPGnet commended the game's breadth, seeing it as the "ultimate incarnation of standard Unisystem". He summarized it as "akin to In Nomine, Exalted, Twilight 2000, and the whole damn World of Darkness versus Call of Cthulhu and Kult in a near-future no-holds-barred supernatural slugfest for the fate of reality itself".

Conan McKegg said the game did not deliver on its promises, saying its rules were uneven, the writing was "lacklustre", and there was a lack of advice or rules for gamemasters to support its themes. He concluded: "Overall, Armageddon is a good setting that is marred by some foolish oversights. Ultimately, it becomes a remarkably average game that is let down by its own professionalism."

Chris Czerniak said the game had excellent artwork and, except for the dark background behind the text, was well designed, well edited and clearly written. He said the game's "major flaw" was its "lack of focus", direction, and detail, which left readers "with all these choices but nowhere to take them".

== Reviews ==
- Backstab #6
- Backstab #48
- Casus Belli #109
- The Unspeakable Oath #16/17 (2001 Digest)
- Dragão Brasil #35
