= Conspiracy X Game Master's Screen =

Tabletop role-playing game supplement

Conspiracy X Game Master's Screen is a supplement published by Eden Studios in 1996 for the modern-era role-playing game Conspiracy X.

== Contents ==
Conspiracy X Game Master's Screen is an eight-panel screen that includes charts and tables for test basics, combat and damage, hacking, and malfunctions. An adventure called "Night of Rage" is also included.

== Reception ==
Andy Butcher reviewed Conspiracy X Game Master's Screen for Arcane magazine, rating it a 7 out of 10 overall, and commented that "What makes this package stand out is the adventure contained in the booklet. Even though it features the supernatural, Black Book agents, and an alien plot, it is straightforward for the referee to run due to the effort that's gone into its preparation."

In the November 1997 edition of Dragon (Issue #241), Rick Swan called this screen "attractive", and thought that the included adventure was "excellent... loaded with supernatural surprises."
