= The Escapist (website) =

- Available in: English
- Owner: William J. Walton
- Creator: William J. Walton
- Website: theescapist.com
- Launched: 1995; 31 years ago

The Escapist is a web resource site that advocates and supports role-playing games (RPGs) as a social and educational activity, and works to educate the public on the true nature of gaming and dispel myths and misunderstandings about the hobby. It is one of a handful of sites that promote RPGs as an activity rather than advocating or supporting any specific game systems.

The site was created in December 1995 by William J. Walton and has been regularly updated for more than a decade. Originally titled The Gaming Advocacy Website, it began as a research project for a technical writing class. In April 1996, the site was expanded into an online zine devoted to role-playing and collectible card games, and shortly after, the rest of the material was scrapped and the site focused entirely on gaming advocacy.

Other examples of independent RPG Advocacy sites which have been cited in the media include the Shakespearean Eclectic Archive and the GAMA "Gaming & Education" site. Such sites counter the efforts of anti-game advocates including Patricia Pulling.

Ed Healy was helping the owners of the website Gaming Outpost with business development, and he decided to create a network of role-playing games websites to feed into the Gaming Outpost; The Escapist was the first site to join but work on creating the network stalled soon after so Healy ultimately created the site Hephaestus' Forge instead.

== Site self-description ==
From the site's main page:

Tabletop role-playing games like Dungeons & Dragons are an engaging and intellectually stimulating activity that promote teamwork, problem solving, and creative thinking. Even better, in hands of a parent, guardian, or educator, they can be a fantastic teaching tool.

Unfortunately, the role-playing hobby has acquired a reputation for being geeky, dangerous, occultic, satanic, and even causing players to be prone to suicide or homicide. Only one of these is accurate — sure, it's a bit geeky, but that's the worst thing that can be said about it. The rest of those claims are pure urban legend.

== Projects and features ==
The Escapist is dedicated to fighting misconceptions and misrepresentations about the RPG industry, and undoing damage caused by sensationalistic reporting and religious campaigns against the hobby.

The Escapist contains several projects that are each devoted to a different aspect of roleplaying advocacy:

- BeQuest, which focuses on connecting gamers, game clubs, and game companies with charitable organizations.
- Reading, Writing, & Roleplaying, an upcoming project that focuses on using roleplaying games as an educational tool.
- Terra Libris: The Library RPG Project, which encourages librarians and volunteers to organize and run role-playing games as Young Adult programs at libraries.
- The Young Person's Adventure League, which focuses on getting children and pre-teens involved in the hobby.
- The Square One Podcast, hosted by Sam Chupp and Bill Walton, a podcast geared towards new and inexperienced gamers.

The site also has regular features of interest to the gaming community:

- Tell Me About Your Character is a series of 'self-serve' interviews with roleplayers from all walks of life.
- The Escapist Video Movie Review Report is a series of reviews of movies and television shows that feature roleplaying as part of the story — either based on published RPG worlds, or on gamers and the act of gaming.
- 20 Sided World is an upcoming feature that explores gaming culture in different parts of the world.

== Spellcasting 101 ==
The most popular of the site's features is an installment of the editorial column Random Encounter titled Spellcasting 101: Don't Try This At Home. In it, the author attempts to test the claims made by many fundamentalist Christian groups and individuals that the Harry Potter books and Dungeons & Dragons game contain real magical rituals that will produce effects that can be reproduced. Numerous spells from both sources are put to the test, including Lumos, Body Bind, Burning Hands, Hold Portal, Spider Climb, and others.

The purpose of the column was to point out the absurdity of the claims being made against different forms of fantasy entertainment. Initial response to the column was very favorable, with hundreds of approving emails arriving from all across the world, many of which were reprinted in the following installment of Random Encounter. Numerous websites linked to the column, including the Steve Jackson Games' Daily Illuminator and Harry Potter fansite The Leaky Cauldron. Forums and newsgroups devoted to role-playing games, Christianity, Wicca, and Paganism also helped to spread the word, and at least one half-hearted attempt at plagiarism appeared on the internet for a short while.

The column is still the most-viewed page of the entire website, several years since its first appearance in 2002.

== William J. Walton ==
The Escapist is Bill Walton's advocacy website for role-playing games. The site creator has been a returning guest of honor at Econocon in New Hampshire and Dexcon in New Jersey. He lives in Delaware with his partner Paula and their two daughters.
