= Eldritch Role-Playing System =

Tabletop role-playing game

Eldritch Role-Playing System is a role-playing game published by Goodman Games in 2008.

== Description ==
Eldritch Role-Playing System is an epic fantasy role-playing game system contained in a 96-page book designed by Dan Cross and Randall Petras, with interior art by Eric Bergeron, and cover art by Peter Bradley.

Rather than being based on D&D's character class system, this RPG is based on abilities and actions.

== Publication history ==
Starting in 2001, Goodman Games had built its business on creating d20 System fantasy role-playing adventures using Dungeons & Dragons 3.0 rules under Wizards of the Coast (WotC)'s Open Game License (OGL) for the d20 System. When WotC started to develop a fourth edition of D&D in 2007, word circulated that the new version would not be covered by the OGL, which would leave Goodman Games unable to produce any further products. Goodman Games decided to experiment by trying to develop an RPG of their own.

In 2007, Goodman Games hinted they were working on a role-playing game based on the Dungeoneer card game; although that game was never produced, Goodman did publish the abstract epic fantasy role-playing game Eldritch Role-Playing System Core Rulebook (2008), by Dan Cross and Randall Petras. The product was not well supported; Goodman Games only supplemented the original Core Rulebook with some small PDFs.

== Reception ==
Malcolm Bowers, author of Gary Gygax's Extraordinary Book of Names, found parts of the book "impenetrably complex." He pointed out that "weird terminology" made the task of assimilating the rules very difficult. "To avoid the unlovely 'to hit roll', the authors came up with the worse 'potential harm' and 'threatpoints' -- the simpler 'attack' or 'threat' would have done, surely." Bowers also found the production values lower than expected: spelling mistakes, misplaced text, stretched images, and changes to certain terms partway through the book. He concluded that overall, the more abstract "classless" approach worked well, but that more story-telling and improvisation would be required of the gamemaster. With no supplemental adventures available, Bowers also pointed out that designing a campaign would fall squarely on the gamemaster. He concluded, "You'll need your own campaign setting, especially if you want to focus less on action than interaction. I recommend it if you're an experienced GM looking for something a bit different."
