= Night's Edge =

Night's Edge is a 1992 role-playing supplement for Cyberpunk published by Ianus Publications.

== Contents ==
Night's Edge is a supplement in which vampires and werewolves are introduced in an alternate reality.

== Publication history ==
Shannon Appelcline noted when Ianus Publications decided they wanted to get into game publishing they licensed Cyberpunk from R. Talsorian Games: "The result was Night's Edge (1992), Ianus' first full-fledged roleplaying publication. Written by Justin Schmid, it uniquely defined an alternate reality for Cyberpunk, mixing vampires and werewolves into Cyberpunk's technological core to create a techno-horror game. Although Ianus also released a few supplements set in Cyberpunk's main timeline, the Night's Edge universe is what caught the attention of players. As a result Ianus devoted most of their new RPG production to Night's Edge supplements starting in 1993, resulting in over a dozen 'alternate reality universe' books though 1995".

== Reception ==
Matthew Lane reviewed Night's Edge in White Wolf #48 (Oct., 1994), rating it a 4 out of 5 and stated that "If I spend [this much] for a sourcebook, it better be overflowing with stuff that I can use. Night's Edge meets this criteria. Even if Cyberpunk is not your forte, the information on vampires and werewolves can easily be applied to other game systems."

== Reviews ==
- The Last Province (Issue 2 - Dec 1992)
- Windgeflüster (Issue 26 - Jun 1994)
