= Abduction (card game) =

Science fiction card game

Abduction is a 1998 collectible card game published by Eden Studios in which players must escape from an alien ship.

== Gameplay ==
Abduction is a game for 2–4 players in which the players have been abducted by aliens. Each player seeks to be the first to escape, while making it more difficult for the other players to escape.

Tokens represent the players, while cards can represent rooms, events and objects. In each round, the active player can take three actions from a possible five:

- Lay a room card next to an existing room, thus expanding the alien ship.
- Play an Event card
- Move from one room to an adjacent room
- Play an object card to pick up that item

At the end of the player's turn, the player draws cards equal to the number of cards played during their turn. An inactive player can play any Event card that says "Play at any time" during another player's turn. Often these interrupt the active player's turn. After four room cards have been played, a player can lay down an Exit card. The first player to reach an Exit card is the winner.

Although a six-sided die is need to play the game, it is not provided.

== Reception ==
The online second volume of Pyramid reviewed Abduction and commented that "Abduction is a card game that ties loosely into Eden's Conspiracy X roleplaying game. You got the same big-headed aliens, the same random humans (and one cow) brought aboard a spaceship, and the same unspeakable experiments."

In Issue 15 of the French games magazine Backstab, Timbre Poste noted that the game was "Based on an original theme and treated with humor, this produces a simple and effective management system which guarantees fast games full of twists and turns." However, Poste did not like that there were multiple copies of several cards, nor the monochromatic green artwork. However, Poste drew the line at the high price of the game, saying, "Its price is in no way justified and unfortunately places it in the category of 'products to avoid at all costs unless you are a collector.'" Poste concluded by giving the game a very poor rating of only 4 out of 10.

Writing for the Swedish game site Spelkult, Tommy Antonsson found the artwork unimaginative but noted that it was a very quick game, lasting only 15–20 minutes. Antonsson also warned players to read the rules very carefully before playing. Antonsson gave ratings of 90% for Innovation and 100% for playability. Ratings for Appearance, Production Values and Rules Clarity were somewhat lower. Antonsson concluded by giving an overall rating of 76%.
