= Wizard's Attic =

Role-playing games wholesaler

Wizard's Attic was an American role-playing game wholesaler and fulfillment house servicing small publishers. It was collapsed in 2004.

== History ==
Wizard's Attic was formed in order to act as a fulfillment house for Chaosium.

Aldo Ghiozzi's Wingnut Games was one of the consolidation clients for Wizard's Attic, and in 2002 the business for Wizard's Attic was beginning to falter and clients such as Ghiozzi were not receiving all of their payments. Wizard's Attic was looking to leave the consolidation business, so Rob Stone of Citizen Games convinced Ghiozzi to move his small company Impressions Advertising & Marketing into the games field. Impressions was using Wizard's Attic for its own base to perform consolidation operations, so Eric Rowe made a corner of the Wizard's Attic warehouse strictly for the use of shipping and receiving the products of Ghiozzi and his clients Citizen Games, Troll Lord Games and Wingnut Games. Wizard's Attic had started shutting down all business except for fulfilment by the end of 2002, so Eric Rowe gave 80 Wizard's Attic consolidation clients to Ghiozzi. As its business kept failing in 2003 Wizard's Attic was going to be locked out of its last warehouse in Kentucky with the product inside, so Ghiozzi secured an arrangement with Chessex to become the new shipper for Impressions, and he flew to Kentucky to recover nine palettes full of merchandise. In 2004 OtherWorld Creations's production came to a halt when both their distributor Wizard's Attic and the d20 market collapsed.

According to Sebastian Deterding and José Zagal, the collapse of Wizard's Attic left "many small publishers with huge financial debts from unpaid revenues and copies of their games that were never returned".
