= C. J. Carella =

American role-playing game designer

C.J. Carella
- Occupations: RPG designer, author

Carlos J. Martijena-Carella is a role-playing game designer and novelist.

== Career ==
=== RPGs ===
Following an introduction to GURPS in Steve Jackson's Man to Man, C.J. Carella got his first work in the role-playing games industry on GURPS Martial Arts (1990) and freelance work for Steve Jackson Games. Carella designed GURPS War Against the Chtorr (1993), which game designer Rick Swan called a "first-rate supplement for the GURPS game". He also wrote GURPS Voodoo: The Shadow War, published in 1995.

Carella then became a staff member of Palladium Books. He created the Nightbane setting and was involved in the production of Mercenaries and Pantheons of the Megaverse for Palladium's multigenre RPG Rifts. While editor-in-chief at Myrmidon Press from 1993–1997, Carella also wrote Rifts Manhunter (1996), as a crossover between Rifts and Myrmidon's own science-fiction game Manhunter.

Myrmidon also published the first editions of Carella's role-playing games CJ Carella's WitchCraft (1996) and Armageddon: The End Times (1997). The games both used Carella's original Unisystem rules engine.

Following negative experiences with the business side of Myrmidon Press, Carella decided to sell the rights to his games to another publisher. At the time, Eden Studios, Inc. founders George Vasilakos and M. Alexander Jurkat were fans of his work and talked with Carella about developing a crossover book for Conspiracy X and Witchcraft. Since Conspiracy X supplement sales were dropping by 1998, Eden Studios wanted to add more lines to revitalize the business, and signed an exclusive license with Carella to publish his WitchCraft and Armageddon role-playing games.

Following the success of the system used in WitchCraft, Carella created a simplified Unisystem variant for the Buffy the Vampire Slayer Roleplaying Game (2002), named the "Cinematic" Unisystem. Carella wrote Secret of the Ancients (2003) which was the final volume of the Odyssey adventures series from Eden. Carella also co-designed Eden Studios' RPG Terra Primate.

=== Novels ===
The New Olympus Saga:

1. Armageddon Girl (2012)
2. Doomsday Duet
3. Apocalypse Dance
4. The Ragnorak Alternative(2015)

noir-horror series where unlikely heroes battle an upcoming Lovecraftian apocalypse:

1. Bad Vibes (2014)
2. Shadowfall: Las Vegas (2015)
3. Dante's Demons (2015)

Warp Marine Series: mil-SF with some interesting Lovecraftian elements:

1. Decisively Engaged (2015)
2. No Price Too High (2016)
3. Advance to Contact (2016)
4. In Dread Silence (2017)
5. Havoc of War (2017)
