= Unisystem =

Tabletop role-playing game system

- Unisystem logo
- Designers: C.J. Carella
- Publishers: Eden Studios, Inc.
- Publication: 2003
- Genres: Universal

Unisystem is a generic role-playing game system produced by Eden Studios, Inc. It is used in All Flesh Must Be Eaten, the Buffyverse role-playing games, CJ Carella's WitchCraft, Conspiracy X (2nd Ed.), and several other games. Games designed using Unisystem have been nominated for, and won, Origins Awards.

Unisystem was developed by C.J. Carella for the first editions of his WitchCraft and Armageddon role-playing games, published by Myrmidion Press. Eden Studios uses Unisystem under an exclusive license, but has allowed other game companies to license the system. Eden Studios published WitchCraft 2nd Edition and their original All Flesh Must Be Eaten games as Unisystem games. Armageddon 2nd Edition and a new 2nd Edition of Eden's own Conspiracy X were later published using this gaming system.

== Gameplay ==
Unisystem games use a point-buy system to generate characters. Points are spent on Attributes, Skills, Qualities and Metaphysics. Drawbacks can be used to gain extra points.

Attributes represent the character's main six abilities, which in this case are three physical attributes: Strength, Dexterity, Constitution; and three mental attributes: Intelligence, Perception, Willpower. Characters also have a variety of Skills, Qualities and Drawbacks to give the character added perks or faults (respectively). Other Qualities and Drawbacks are of a Supernatural sort and are used to designate a character as a particular type of character (be it a Gifted human, a Vampyre, a Spirit, and so on) or detail what sort of magic they can do.

Actions are resolved by adding together the character's relevant Attribute, the applicable Skill, and a ten-sided die roll, plus any modifiers for difficulty; if the total is nine or greater, the action succeeds. Gamemasters (called "Chroniclers" in Classic, and "Directors" in Cinematic Unisystem) are also given tables of successes: characters that get a higher roll than the required nine have bonuses on their final outcome; this table describes how successful they turn out to be, and gives guidelines to figure out the resulting bonuses.

== Classic versus Cinematic ==
Unisystem can be divided into two sub-systems: Classic and Cinematic.

Classic Unisystem was developed first and is featured in All Flesh Must Be Eaten, Armageddon, Conspiracy X 2.0, Terra Primate and WitchCraft. It is typified by grittier, more realistic play, greater attention to detail in skills and combat, and the use of Secondary Attributes that are typically derived from the Primary Attributes. Essence, or the measure of life-force and magic, is also central to Classic Unisystem play.

Cinematic Unisystem was designed to mimic the "cinematic" exploits of characters. First developed for the Buffy the Vampire Slayer Roleplaying Game, it was later adopted for use in Angel, Army of Darkness and Ghosts of Albion. Cinematic features a limited set of skills that cover most situations, no Secondary Attributes or Essence, simplified combat and flat damage resolution. Cinematic games also feature the use of Drama Points which allow the character to do things above and beyond what they could do under the system alone.

The chief difference between the systems are Drama Points (used only in the Cinematic system), and differences in magic system mechanics.

Despite the differences the two are still largely compatible, though every Cinematic Unisystem game offers an appendix to convert values from the Classic system, and the Buffy RPG's Magic Box supplement offers an appendix on converting between the Buffy magic system and the WitchCraft magic system.
