= Deryni Adventure Game =

Tabletop fantasy role-playing game

- The Cover of Deryni Adventure Game
- Designers: Aaron S. Rosenberg, Ann Dupuis, and Melissa Hoale
- Publishers: Grey Ghost Games
- Publication: 2005
- Genres: Fantasy
- Systems: Fudge RPG

Written by fantasy novelist Aaron S. Rosenberg, the Deryni Adventure Game is a role-playing game that is based in the Deryni novels created by Katherine Kurtz.

== Setting ==
The setting closely resembles earth's medieval Period except with the inclusion of the Deryni, a race of humans with powers like mental telepathy and telekinesis. Many of the stories focus around the conflicts between these two races.

== System ==
The Deryni Adventure Game uses Freeform Universal Donated Game Engine (FUDGE), a system created in 1992 by Steffan O'Sullivan on the rec.games.design newsgroup. Its design focuses more on the story and the player instead of dice throws.

== History ==
Grey Ghost Games released The Deryni Adventure Game (2005), a Fudge role-playing game based on the Deryni novels by Katherine Kurtz. The Deryni Adventure Game was one of the first products to be designed around the Fudge RPG system. Deryni Adventure Game also has custom dice, and a full size poster map of the Eleven Kingdoms and is the second main product of Grey Ghost Games.

== Reviews ==
- Pyramid
