= Army of Darkness Roleplaying Game =

Tabletop role-playing game

- Publishers: Eden Studio
- Publication: 2005; 21 years ago
- Genres: Dark Fantasy
- Systems: Unisystem

The Army of Darkness Roleplaying Game is a role-playing game published by Eden Studios, Inc. in 2005.

== Gameplay ==
The game consists of a selection of hero cards for customized survivors with their own abilities, the same for the enemy class, with random events called "drama points".

== Production ==
The Army of Darkness Roleplaying Game is based on the film Army of Darkness, though it borrows several elements and concepts from the previous two installments of the Evil Dead franchise: The Evil Dead and Evil Dead II. It uses the Cinematic Unisystem developed for the Buffy the Vampire Slayer Roleplaying Game.

== Publication history ==
Shane Lacy Hensley designed the role-playing game Army of Darkness (2005) for Eden Studios. The Army of Darkness Roleplaying Game was published by Eden Studios, Inc. in 2005.

== Reviews ==
- Pyramid
