= Battlelords =

1995 collectible card game

- Card back to Battlelords CCG
- Designers: M. Alexander Jurkat
- Publishers: New Millennium Entertainment
- Players: 2–5
- Playing time: Approx 90 min
- Chance: Some
- Skills: Card playing Arithmetic; Basic Reading Ability

Battlelords is an out-of-print collectible card game based on the Optimus Design Systems (ODS) licensed paper and pencil role-playing game titled Battlelords of the 23rd Century. The card game was released in 1995 and only one set was produced. Two planned expansion sets called Genesis and Arachnids never materialized. The card game was introduced by New Millennium Entertainment (now defunct). According to Allen Varney, the game was "really good" and "as good as Star Wars, thought not quite as pretty". Varney also stated that the game had a "steep learning curve, plays badly from a single starter, and the rulebook's print is ludicrously small." The Battlelords of the 23rd Century license was later sold by ODS to SSDC, Inc. in September 1999.
