= Heroes of Olympus (role-playing game) =

- Cover of 2nd edition box, art by Chris White
- Designers: B. Dennis Sustare
- Illustrators: R. Vance Buck; Chris White
- Publishers: Task Force Games
- Publication: 1981
- Genres: Greek mythology

Heroes of Olympus is a role-playing game published by Task Force Games in 1981 that is set in the world of Greek mythology.

== Description ==
Heroes of Olympus is a fantasy role-playing game system that takes place in the heroic age of ancient Greece in which the player characters are Argonauts serving in the crew of Jason. Players can choose pregenerated Argonauts or can create a hero using a point-based character generation system. The game is intended to include elements from role-playing games, board games and wargames. The rules present the backgrounds and abilities for Argonauts, as well as how to handle character improvement, combat (with rules for trickery), sailing, magic, nonhuman races, the gods, and advice on how to run a role-playing campaign. The set includes four adventure scenarios with a color map for each scenario, which include the Golden Fleece, as well as encounters with the Harpies and Clashing Rocks.

The 2nd edition of the game also includes some miniatures as well as reprinting an article from Different Worlds on how to adapt characters from this game to Thieves' World.

== Publication history ==
Heroes of Olympus was written by B. Dennis Sustare, and published by Task Force Games in 1981 as a boxed set with an orange cover, containing a 56-page book, five maps, two cardboard counter sheets, and dice. Heroes of Olympus was the first of a number of what author Shannon Appelcline refers to as "pseudo-RPGs" produced by Task Force Games, similar to those published by other wargaming companies such as DragonQuest from Simulations Publications and The Fantasy Trip by Metagaming Concepts. Heroes of Olympus was supported by two magazine articles. The second edition, published in 1983, was a larger boxed set with a cover by Chris White, containing a 56-page book, a pamphlet, five maps, counters, metal miniatures, and dice.

== Reception ==
In Issue 24 of Abyss, John Davies questioned whether this was a true role-playing game because of the high degree of randomness through die rolls, which denied decision making to the players. Davies thought another weakness of the game was its reliance on a Jason and the Argonauts background. Davies concluded, "Heroes of Olympus is nicely produced and has some interesting ideas, but as a role-playing game it is undeniably a failure."

In Issue 30 of Different Worlds, Oliver Dickinson stated, "I have to say that I feel the rules for Heroes [o]f Olympus, though interesting, are likely to seem too complex to many people, who may feel impatient at the amount they have to learn and remember before they can play or, particularly, run a scenario as gamemaster; and I must repeat that the layout of the text is not conducive to easy absorption of the contents. It is possible that these features can be remedied, but whether it would be possible to develop a full role-playing game on this basis I cannot say." Dickinson concluded, "I think the designer has made a brave try, but does not quite come off."

According to Shannon Appelcline, although the game included elements used in roleplaying games, board games and wargames, "it was probably as much of a roleplaying game as other RPGs from the same time period," such as DragonQuest and The Fantasy Trip.
