= Grey Ghost Press =

American publisher of tabletop roleplaying games

Grey Ghost Games
- Industry: Games
- Founded: 1995
- Headquarters: Randolph, Massachusetts, United States
- Key people: Ann Dupuis, President
- Revenue: Unknown
- Number of employees: 2 (Estimate)
- Website: FudgeRPG.com
- Footnotes / references Source Dun & Bradstreet

Grey Ghost Press was founded in 1994 by Ann Dupuis after spending time working on the Fudge RPG system by Steffan O'Sullivan. She initially created the company as Wild Mule Games in 1994. The following year the company was incorporated as Ghostdancer Press, and then renamed as Grey Ghost Press.

The company became owner of the copyright to Fudge and began officially publishing the system with their first release, Fudge 1995 Edition. They re-released the system as Fudge 1995 Expanded Edition.

The company published additional games based on the Fudge rules, such as Gatecrasher and Terra Incognita.

In 2000, Grey Ghost received the rights to publish an RPG based on Katherine Kurtz's fantasy world Deryni and the Eleven Kingdoms.

The Deryni Adventure Game was nominated for "Role-Playing Game of the Year" at the 2006 Origins Game Fair Awards.

== Fudge RPG ==
The Freeform Universal Donated Game Engine was created in 1992 by Steffan O'Sullivan on the rec.games.design newsgroup. Its design focuses more on the story and the player instead of dice throws.
