= Fudge (role-playing game system) =

Tabletop role-playing game system

- Designers: Steffan O'Sullivan
- Publishers: Grey Ghost Press
- Publication: 1992
- Genres: Universal

Fudge is a generic role-playing game system for use in freeform role-playing games. The name "FUDGE" was once an acronym for Freeform Universal Donated (later, Do-it-yourself) Gaming Engine and, though the acronym has since been dropped, that phrase remains a good summation of the game's design goals. Fudge has been nominated for an Origins Award for Best Role-Playing Game System for the Deryni Adventure Game.

Rather than being a rigidly pre-defined set of rules like d20 System or GURPS, Fudge offers a customizable toolkit for building the users' own specialized role-playing game system. Such things as what attributes and skills will define characters are left to be determined by the Game Master and players, and several different optional systems for resolving actions and conflicts are offered. Fudge is not tied to any particular genre or setting and world builders are encouraged to invent appropriate attributes and rules tailored to the campaign.

== History ==
The project that would lead to Fudge was first proposed by Steffan O'Sullivan in November 1992 on the rec.games.design newsgroup, and over the following months that online community would contribute to the directed project. One of the earliest stipulations of O'Sullivan was that the basic system would always remain free to the public over the internet, and the PDF of the 1995 version still is. The 1995 version of Fudge is available under a non-commercial licence.

Grey Ghost Press, with the endorsement of Steffan O'Sullivan, publishes an expanded form of the Fudge system. There have been three Grey Ghost Press editions, the most current being the Fudge 10th Anniversary Edition, which includes several suggested rules systems for common RPG elements and an example basic fantasy "build" of the game.

In March 2004, Grey Ghost Press acquired the copyright of Fudge, and on April 6, 2005, they released a version of Fudge under the Open Game License.

The OGL license has allowed the Fate role-playing game system to build on Fudge as its underlying mechanic.

In 1999 Pyramid magazine named Fudge as one of The Millennium's Most Underrated Games. Editor Scott Haring stated "Fudge is an extremely flexible, rules-light system. It works great, and everybody who plays it, loves it. Why isn't it more popular? I dunno."

== Name ==
At the time Fudge was conceived, it was stylish to give role-playing games acronyms for names (for instance, GURPS and TWERPS), and originally the usenet design project referred to the game as SLUG, for "Simple Laid-back Universal Game". However, this was soon changed to FUDGE for "Free-form Universal Donated Gaming Engine", but also because the word invoked connotations of an easy to make source of fun. This again was changed when Grey Ghost Press released their 1995 hard copy version of the game, to "Free-form Universal Do-it-yourself Gaming Engine".

With the publication of the Expanded Edition in 2000, the fad for acronym-based names had long since faded, and the writer and the publisher both felt that the forced acronym had become irrelevant. The game has been referred to officially as just Fudge ever since, though fans often still refer to it in the old manner as FUDGE.

== Game mechanics ==
In Fudge, character Traits such as Attributes and Skills, are rated on a seven-level, ascending adjective scale: Terrible, Poor, Mediocre, Fair, Good, Great, and Superb.

Fudge characters can also have Gifts and Faults, which are positive and negative traits that do not fit into the adjective scale.

=== Fudge dice ===
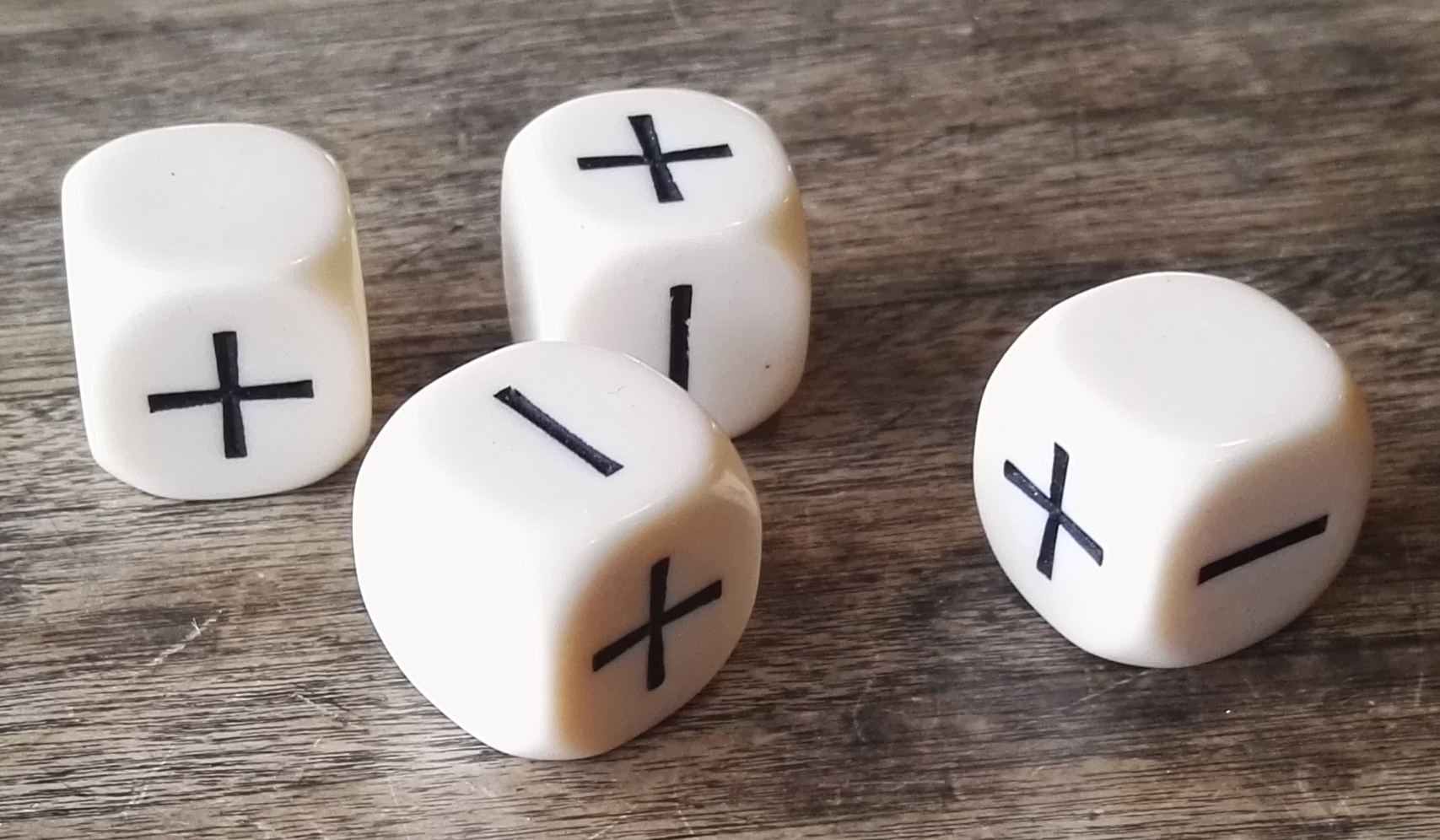
A set of Fudge dice

Probability of results when rolling 4dF

Fudge uses customized "Fudge dice" which have an equal number of plus, minus, and blank sides. A number of these dice are rolled, usually four at a time ("4dF" in Fudge dice notation), and for every plus side that comes up the result of using the Trait is considered one step higher (e.g. from Fair to Good) and for every minus side that comes up the result is considered one step lower.

The goal is to match or surpass the difficulty level, also on the adjective scale, of the test. Thus, a Good attribute is considered to be Great if the player were to roll two plus sides, one minus side, and one blank—the minus side cancels out one of the plus sides and the remaining plus side raises the result by one step. The same Good attribute would be considered Poor if you were to roll three minus sides and one blank.

The same dice roll can be achieved with six-sided dice, treating a 1 or 2 as [−], a 3–4 as [ ] and a 5–6 as [+]. There are also several alternative dice systems available that use ten-sided dice, coins, or playing cards.

== Complexity ==
The rules of Fudge are highly customizable and can be adjusted for the level of simplicity or complexity desired by the Game Master and Players. Overall, the system is designed to encourage role-playing over strict adherence to a set of rules. In fact, the main Fudge documents encourage players to "Just Fudge It"; that is, to focus on the story being created rather than on the game rules. For example, one character creation method encourages players to first write prose descriptions of their characters and then translate those into Fudge Traits.

== Reception ==
In the January 1996 edition of Dragon (Issue 225), Rick Swan called this game system "a remarkable achievement, a concise, logical analysis of RPG theory that amateur and pro designers alike would do well to ponder." Although Swan liked the simplicity and logic of the open system, he felt that too much of the onus fell on the gamemaster. "Not only must he role-play the NPCs, stage memorable encounters, and keep the story on track, he must also come up with Difficulty Levels for every conceivable situation. It ain't easy." He concluded by giving the game a rating of 5 out of 6, saying, "FUDGE is about as appropriate for novices as calculus is for preschoolers. Seasoned gamers, however, will be in for a pleasant surprise."

In Issue 17 of Shadis, Leonard Wilson was enthusiastic about this game system, writing, "Simply put, from start to finish, FUDGE is the sort of quality product that can't be mistaken for anything but a labor of love for everyone involved. If you're a role-player who frequents the Internet anyway, you'll be missing a real treasure if you don't download yourself a copy. Even if you don’t frequent the Internet, if you've ever found yourself tinkering with the rules to a role-playing games, you'll find it well worth the effort to track down a copy of FUDGE."

In Issue 3 of the French games magazine Backstab, Stéphane Bura liked the game system, commenting "This is, to my knowledge, the best system using a normal bell curve (frequent average results and rare extreme results) published to date ... Even if it requires some effort, FUDGE will satisfy those looking for a good generic system less complicated than GURPS." Bura concluded by giving the game system a rating of 8 out of 10.

In Issue 30 of the Australian game magazine Australian Realms, Mike Bell wrote, "What lifts FUDGE to new heights of excellence [...] is the way it encourages and guides through designing your very own personalised RPG using the basic building blocks supplied by its author, Stefan O'Sullivan. Originally distributed via the Internet, buyers are actively encouraged to design and distribute their own FUDGE-based games so long as they include copyright notices and a disclaimer. Way cool!"

In his 2023 book Monsters, Aliens, and Holes in the Ground, RPG historian Stu Horvath noted, "Most people didn't see it at the time, but FUDGE marks a fundamental change in RPGs. Simultaneously a system of rules and a treatise on game design theory, it questions many of the methods and mechanics that are taken for granted about roleplaying and reshapes those assumptions, paving the way for other games to continue pushing into new forms in the coming decades."

== Other reviews and commentary ==
- Rollespilsmagasinet Fønix (Danish) (Issue 15 - Feb 1997)
- Pyramid - Fudge Expanded Edition
