= Buffy the Vampire Slayer Roleplaying Game =

Tabletop horror role-playing game

Buffy the Vampire Slayer
- Revised Corebook cover, 2005
- Designers: C. J. Carella
- Publishers: Eden Studios, Inc.
- Publication: 2002; 24 years ago
- Genres: Action, adventure, horror, drama
- Systems: Unisystem
- Website: www.edenstudios.net/buffyrpg.html
- ISBN: 1-891153-88-9

The Buffy the Vampire Slayer Roleplaying Game was published by Eden Studios, Inc. in 2002. It is based on the television series Buffy the Vampire Slayer that ran from 1997–2003. It is written by C. J. Carella, and uses the Unisystem game engine that many of Eden's games used.

== Development ==
According to M Alexander Jurkat, Eden Studios' editor-in-chief, his colleague George Vasilakos learned that the publishers of the Buffy the Vampire Slayer collectible card game, Score Entertainment, were looking for a publishing partner to develop a roleplaying game based on the series. Jurkat and Vasilakos thought their experience at Eden Studios, publishing games such as CJ Carella's WitchCraft and Conspiracy X, gave them an advantage, and pitched their version of the game to Score Entertainment.

After their bid was successful, Jurkat contracted C.J. Carella, creator of WitchCraft and the Unisystem rules engine, to write the game with a team of contributors and playtesters. Jurkat edited the game and Vasilakos did the graphic design. Believing the game had broad appeal, the Eden Studios team decided to pitch it at non-roleplayers, using accessible language and lots of examples to help those new to the hobby. The game also makes extensive use of quotations and photography from the TV show, and includes the show's main characters as playable options.

== Books and products ==
There are six available titles in the Buffy the Vampire Slayer Role-playing Game product line. In order of release, these are:

=== Buffy the Vampire Slayer Roleplaying Game: Core Rulebook ===
The Core Rulebook (ISBN 1-891153-88-9) provides an introduction to the setting, characters, rules, and appendices. The appendices include the dialogue and slang used on the show, the differences between the Classic and Cinematic Unisystem rules, charts and summaries of concepts, and a full glossary and index. The book features extensive photography from the show, as well as original artwork from Randy Post and Christopher Shy.

Core Rulebook limited edition

The Core Rulebook was released alongside a limited edition (1000 copies) (ISBN 1-891153-92-7) with a cream-colored leatherette cover, red foil Buffy logo, and red cloth bookmark. In 2005, Eden Studios released the Revised Core Rulebook (ISBN 1-933105-10-0). It incorporated errata and rules updates to bring the game in line with the Angel Roleplaying Game, and included updated characters and adversaries for the sixth and seventh seasons of the series.

=== Buffy the Vampire Slayer Roleplaying Game: Slayer's Handbook ===
The Slayer's Handbook (ISBN 1-891153-89-7) and limited edition (ISBN 1-891153-93-5), with a blue leatherette cover, red foil "Slayer" graphic, and red cloth bookmark. This first supplement included expanded backgrounds, major life events unique to Slayers, new qualities, drawbacks, archetypes, weapons.

The book also contains suggestions on setting a game in different time periods, locations, and parallel realities. Three complete settings exploring these themes are provided. Finally, the Slayer's Handbook includes "The Chosen Two", an adventure which can be used to continue the Djinn Season.

The book is named after the Slayer's Handbook in the Buffyverse. In the series, the watchers have a book for slayers referred to as the Slayer's Handbook which is given to Slayers-in-training.

=== Buffy the Vampire Slayer Roleplaying Game: Monster Smackdown ===
(ISBN 1-891153-90-0) and limited edition (ISBN 1-891153-90-0) with a black leatherette cover, red foil "Evil" graphic, and red cloth bookmark. This supplement includes rules and abilities for various supernatural and mundane adversaries. A few, such as the troll and Miquot Clan Demon, may be player characters. Like the previous books, it includes a Djinn Season episode, "The Once and Future HST", which plays with events from the series as well as mythological elements.

=== Buffy the Vampire Slayer Roleplaying Game: Director's Screen ===
This Director's Screen (ISBN 1891153919) four-panel card stock Gamemaster's screen included a 56-page booklet with directing tips and three adventures for the Djinn Season: "When Giants Clash", "All A-buzz", and "The Bricklayer". These follow on from the adventure "Sweeps Week" in the core rulebook.

=== Buffy the Vampire Slayer Roleplaying Game: The Magic Box ===
The Magic Box cover.

This Magic Box (ISBN 1-891153-94-3) softcover supplement, written by John Snead, includes an expanded ruleset for magic spells and spell-casters, new mystical abilities, new Qualities and Drawbacks, enchanters (who create magic items), super-scientists (such as Warren Mears), and an adventure, Orphan Trouble. The book also introduces several magical organizations and rules for psychic powers such as telepathy, telekinesis, psychometry, and so on.

=== Buffy the Vampire Slayer Roleplaying Game: Character Journal ===
(ISBN 1-891153-57-9) This is a 16-page booklet that expands the game's character sheet.

=== Unreleased ===
Buffy the Vampire Slayer Roleplaying Game: Welcome to Sunnydale (ISBN 1-891153-95-1) was completed but never released, as Eden Studios lost their franchise licence in October 2006. Similarly, Tea and Crossbows, written by Phil Masters, was also completed but never released.

== Canon ==
The Buffy the Vampire Slayer Roleplaying Game contributed to Buffyverse canon, with Faith Lehane and Kendra Young's last names. These were provided by Joss Whedon in response to queries from Eden Studios.

== Reviews ==
- BBC
- Psycho Drive-in
- Pyramid
- RPGnet review by Dan Davenport
- RPGnet review by Alex White
- Scrye
- Realms of Fantasy
