= CJ Carella's WitchCraft =

- Second edition core book
- Designers: C. J. Carella, M. Alexander Jurkat
- Publishers: Eden Studios, Inc.
- Publication: 1996
- Genres: Horror, Contemporary Fantasy
- Systems: Unisystem

CJ Carella's WitchCraft, originally published as WitchCraft (ISBN 978-1891153402), is a modern horror role-playing game published by Eden Studios, Inc. It is based on the Unisystem game system and was initially published by Myrmidon Press in July 1996. In both cases it was designed and written by C. J. Carella. WitchCraft was the first RPG to use the Unisystem game system. The system was later adapted for other games, such as Eden's Buffy the Vampire Slayer Roleplaying Game.

== Setting ==
Player characters can take on the role of various types of magic-using humans known as the "Gifted". Other characters can be "Lesser Gifted" (less magically capable, but have more mundane skills), "Mundane" (non-magical humans), or even various supernatural races such as vampires, spirits, or Bast (intelligent shape-shifting cats). There are several different associations (called Covenants) described in the main rulebook, and several more in the supplements. Some of the Covenants, such as the divinely inspired Sentinels, fight centuries-long battles, both in open war and more subtle battles of intrigue and magic. Other Covenants, such as the Rosicrucians and Cabal of Psyche are mutual aid societies, but even these neutral societies are being drawn into the fight to stop or delay the "Reckoning". Precisely what the Reckoning is no one can say, but more and more Gifted and Supernatural beings are rising with every passing year, and what is at stake may well be the whole of reality.

WitchCraft draws heavily on modern Neo-Paganism and its practices, with the caveat that while it does this, it does not espouse one belief system over any other. WitchCraft features a creator deity, although the exact nature of the creator is left undefined. The WitchCraft setting includes dreamworlds, fae creatures, shapeshifters, vampires, demons, angels, and many other things inspired by a wide range of mythology. Many comparisons have been drawn between WitchCraft and the World of Darkness games—which also feature supernatural protagonists in a contemporary urban fantasy/horror setting—in particular Mage.

In the world of WitchCraft, magic is divided into several types of metaphysical arts including magic, seer (psychic) powers, necromancy, divine miracles, and other forms which are defined in supplements.

The system used in WitchCraft was later adapted for Eden's Buffy the Vampire Slayer Roleplaying Game. The Buffy core rulebook also gives advice on how to convert Buffy characters to WitchCraft.

=== Associations ===
WitchCraft RPG 1st Edition from Myrmidon Press.

There are various associations or "covenants" to which the player characters can belong, but this is not required of any character.

The Wicce
The witches of the modern world. They are numerous and diverse but all share some common goals and desires.
The Rosicrucians
The upper crust of the magical world. Conflict between the Rosicrucians and the Wicce are common story threads.
Society of Sentinels
The Holy Warriors. Gathered from the three great religions the Sentinels fight a holy war against all supernatural creatures.
The Cabal of Psyche
A hidden group of psychics that remember the witch trials all too well and do their best to keep them from happening again.
The Solitaires
Unaligned Gifted and Lesser Gifted that do not belong to any association or group.

Two other groups that are not associations are:

The Combine
The proverbial "Other", the ones that are behind the scenes pulling the strings or working with the Government. Believed to be out to destroy all magical beings, but the truth is no one knows for sure who they are or what they are doing.
The Mundanes
Everyone else. They have no magic and are largely ignorant of the magical world, but they outnumber the magical beings tens of thousands to one so they are a force to be reckoned with.

== System ==
WitchCraft was the first Unisystem game published. Like all Unisystem games, WitchCraft uses a point-buy system to generate characters. After choosing a Character Type which grants Character Points, points are then spent on Attributes, Skills, Qualities and Metaphysics. Drawbacks can be taken to gain extra points.

Six attributes represent the character's innate abilities, which in this case are three physical attributes: Strength, Dexterity, Constitution; and three mental attributes: Intelligence, Perception, Willpower. Characters may also take have a variety of skills, and Qualities and Drawbacks to give the character added advantages or faults. Supernatural Qualities and Drawbacks are used to designate a particular type of character (Gifted, Bast, Spirit, and so on) or detail what sort of magic a character can do.

Actions are resolved by adding together a player's relevant attribute and skill to the result of a ten-sided die roll, adding any modifiers for difficulty. If the total is nine or greater, the action succeeds. WitchCraft, like all Unisystem games, is considered quite dangerous in combat.

The game also includes several different types of supernatural power, including necromancy, psychic powers, divine inspiration, and spellcasting, each using their own distinct rules system. Characters can boost their magical arts with mystical energy called essence, which can be gathered through rituals, and by drawing on the essence created by times, places and things of power (e.g., by casting with a talisman while standing inside a pentacle at midnight on the equinox).

== Publications ==
WitchCraft was initially advertised under the name The Craft, before it was released as WitchCraft in July 1996. The second edition was titled CJ Carella's WitchCraft. Four supplements were published for the game:

Mystery Codex (ISBN 978-1891153419)
The first supplement to WitchCraft. Details more Spirit and Undead types, expanded information on Vampyres, includes the Storm Dragon and Pariah Associations, and expanded Metaphysics.
Abomination Codex (ISBN 978-1891153426)
Introduces the Knights Templar, Voodoo, True Immortals, as well as expanded rules for Ferals (were-creatures) and more Metaphysics.
Power and Privilege (ISBN 978-1891153471)
The first Association sourcebook details the Brotherhood of the Rose Cross (Rosicrucians).
Book of Hod (ISBN 978-1891153327)
The first Sephiroth book details Hod, the land of Dreams.

=== Unreleased titles ===
Eden Studios and C. J. Carella had planned or scheduled several other supplements for WitchCraft that ultimately were never published. The Book of Geburah would have dealt with the game's underworld, while the Book of Yesod would cover fairy races and mythical creatures such as dragons. The Secrets Codex would have dealt with the mysterious Combine. Honor and Blood would have detailed Yesod, the Society of the Sentinels, and angels and demons. Grace and Guidance would have detailed the Storm Dragons.

== Reception ==
Upon its release, reviewers generally thought the game was promising, commending its professional presentation, writing, and simple system, but criticizing certain complicated subsystems, such as the combat rules, and the lack of detail and originality in the setting. They also compared it to various World of Darkness games.

In Arcane magazine, Andy Butcher rated WitchCraft a 7 out of 10, saying: "Well written, well designed, and well put-together, Witchcraft is a good, solid modern-day horror system that's easy to get into and fun to play. Unfortunately, it just doesn't offer anything particularly new or original to the genre." Writing for Backstab, Johan Scipion gave the game three stars, complementing its straightforward rules, but criticizing the game's lack of an introductory storyline and its similarity to the World of Darkness.

In Dragon Magazine #239, Rick Swan said the system was good but that the combat rules were overly complicated. He also criticized the brevity of the setting, which he felt was similar to Vampire: The Masquerade but undeveloped. He concluded: "Witchcraft could've been great. But due to the skeletal setting, it's merely good." Reviewing the game for Casus Belli, Fabrice Colin said the game's setting lacked detail, conflict, and direction, and was overall less original than Mage: The Ascension. Despite this, he said WitchCraft was more accessible and clearer than Mage, and that it had the potential to improve with future supplements.

Writing for RPGnet, reviewer Dan Buterbaugh said the game was flexible, and enjoyed that the setting was dark but still had hope. Conan McKegg said the game's breadth was both a strength and a weakness, resulting in a lack of detail and focus. He also felt the game's system was overcomplicated by the addition of "odd and apparently arbitrary rules systems", such as those for damage resolution, critical successes, and the different types of magic.

In a review for RPGnet, Dan Davenport gave the book 5/5 for both style and substance, noting the simplicity of the game's rules, its attractive layout, and the "darkly compelling setting". While noting the similarities between WitchCraft and the World of Darkness games, he said WitchCraft was more focused on outward conflicts and resembled the works of Stephen King more than Anne Rice.

Reviewing the game in 2020, Egg Embryo of d20 Radio said it was dated in places, especially regarding cultural issues and combat rules, but that the magic system was "genius" for "its ability to cover D&D style combat casting and movie style ritual casting". He concluded the game was "worth a look", particularly as it was available for free on DriveThruRPG.

=== Reviews ===
- Arcane #15
- Backstab #29
- Casus Belli #100
- d20 Radio
- Dragon Magazine #239
- Coleção Dragão Brasil
