= All Flesh Must Be Eaten =

Tabletop horror role-playing game

- Revised Edition cover
- Designers: George Vasilakos
- Publishers: Eden Studios, Inc.
- Publication: 1999 (first edition)
- Genres: Zombie survival horror
- Systems: Unisystem
- ISBN: 1-891153-31-5

All Flesh Must Be Eaten or AFMBE is an Origins Award nominated survival horror role-playing game (RPG) produced by Eden Studios, Inc. using the Unisystem game system. AFMBE is derived from the traditional horror movie depictions of zombies who rise from the dead as mindless monsters that consume the living. In addition to producing a revised edition and many RPG supplements, there have been many works of fiction published that take place in one of the game's many settings.

AFMBE is one of the first RPGs to focus on zombies as the main aspect of survival horror. While other games do have zombies, AFMBE was the first to make them central. AFMBE was also the first new Unisystem game produced by Eden under their exclusive licenses of the Unisystem game.

The main rule book details character creation, skills, qualities (positive characteristics), drawbacks (negative characteristics), zombie creation rules, character archetypes and several campaign settings (called "Deadworlds" in the jargon of the game). The game has a large following and several expansion books.

AFMBE genre books also serve double duty as expansions to the Classic Unisystem rules for various movie, TV and literature genres, such as the Western, pulp fiction, and sci-fi. The Revised Edition also includes an appendix detailing conversions to the d20 System.

== Expansions ==
All of these expansions contain new archetypes, Deadworlds, zombies and other elements.

Zombie Master Screen
The first expansion to AFMBE, including a master screen as well as a book with adventures, new rules and an essay about Zombie Survival Horror.
All Tomorrow's Zombies
This supplement is the sci-fi expansion for AFMBE, and contains rules for starships, cyberpunk, and general future tech, as well as containing very different sci-fi Deadworlds. First published in 2007.
Atlas of the Walking Dead
Includes upgraded zombie creation rules, based upon various legendary undead from around the world, including the Shuten-Doji ("Japanese Vampire"), Gyonshee ("Chinese Hopping Vampire") and Aztec Mummy.
Band of Zombies
Covers World War II and rules required to address stories set during the conflict such as dogfighting and naval combat, mass combat rules, and tactical miniatures skirmish rules. It is also the only sourcebook containing a single Deadworld.
Dungeons and Zombies
An AFMBE take on classic fantasy.
Enter the Zombie
Chinese/Japanese/Hong Kong zombies, including chi techniques, martial arts, and Gun Fu.
Fistful O' Zombies
Western-style AFMBE, with rules for conversion to and from Deadlands: The Weird West, as well as 'spaghetti western' and 'singing cowboy' Deadworlds.
One of the Living
A player's guide to the game, as well as rules for depicting a post-Rise world and information to help run a long-term campaign.
Pulp Zombies
Pulp AFMBE, includes Mentalism rules to add to or replace Miracles/Chi Techniques for Gifted characters. Includes the creator-owned prose novella "The Night Chicago Died" by James Lowder, which is the debut of his character The Corpse and was a Best Short Fiction finalist for the 2003 Origins Awards.
Worlds of the Dead
This book contains 21 brand-new Deadworlds in which to run adventures or campaigns.
Argh! Thar Be Zombies!
This release is a pirate sourcebook, with rules for nautical combat and other aids for swashbuckling games.
Zombie Smackdown!
An AFMBE take on wrestling, with Deadworlds such as Immortal Kombat (based on Mortal Kombat).

The following are not genre or Deadworld books like the above, but adventures, archetypes (and new character and zombie qualities), as well as inspiration for running an All Flesh game:

The Book of Archetypes 1&2
New characters and ready to run archetypes for any AFMBE game.
Little Town of Hamlin
An Adobe Acrobat PDF file adventure set in Hamlin, of Pied Piper fame. For use with the Dead at 1000 Deadworld from the AFMBE Corebook.
The Book of All Flesh, The Book of More Flesh, and The Book of Final Flesh
Anthologies of creator-owned zombie fiction, designed to provide inspiration for the RPG, all edited by James Lowder. Individual books in the series were finalists for the International Horror Guild Award and the Origins Award, with The Book of Final Flesh winning the 2003 Best Long Fiction Origins Award. Works from all three books were published by Elder Signs Press in 2009 as The Best of All Flesh, also edited by Lowder.

== Reviews ==
- Backstab #21
- Polyhedron #145

== See also ==
- List of zombie novels
