= Conspiracy X =

Tabletop role-playing game

- Second edition core book
- Designers: Dave Chapman, George Vasilakos
- Publishers: Eden Studios, Inc.
- Publication: 1996 (1st Edition - New Millennium Entertainment), 2006 (2nd Edition - Eden Studios)
- Genres: Espionage
- Systems: GURPS, Unisystem

Conspiracy X is a role-playing game (RPG) originally released by New Millennium Entertainment in 1996, and since revised and released by several publishers including Steve Jackson Games and Eden Studios, Inc. In all versions, the setting posits that aliens are insidiously taking over the world, reminiscent of The X-Files.

The current version is based on the Unisystem, but previous versions have used GURPS and its own system.

== Setting ==
A secret American government agency called AEGIS has been aware since the Roswell Incident of 1947 that there is an extraterrestrial presence on Earth, characterized by supernatural and paranormal phenomena. Player characters take the role of AEGIS operatives, usually disaffected government agents employed by real-world organizations such as the FBI or ATF or an organization created for the game, such as the Defense Tactical Information Center or Project Rasputin. The game also touches on many modern popular conspiracy theories including the CIA involvement with psychics and the alien cover up from MKULTRA. The game can also be run to focus on paranormal happenings such as ghost sightings or ESP.

== First Edition ==
The first edition was originally published as a 224-page softcover book by New Millennium Entertainment. Eden Studios acquired the rights, their first RPG, and continued to use the first version, which went through several printings, with the Third Printing – Revised carrying a copyright date of 1997.

Many supplemental books were produced for the line including books detailing alien technologies and races, the supernatural (as it is defined in the setting), governmental agencies as AEGIS and Black Book (also known as the National Defense Directorate or NDD), as well as a book on how to create conspiracies. A series of shorter supplements, called Bodyguard of Lies (three books with miscellaneous additions to the world and rules as well as missions) was also produced.

This edition features an original rules system. Character generation is via a "point-buy" system, where players are given 100 points to divide amongst basic abilities as well as skills and resources. The player can also purchase more points by adding disadvantages to the character. For example, adding "Wanted by the Law" to the character nets another 20 points to spend.

Players then act communally to plan "the Cell", the base of operations they will be using for the adventure, including details of location, facilities, staff, and equipment.

Actions are resolved with one of only four probabilities:

- Easy (100%) – Automatic Success (if your skill exceeds the difficulty level)
- Medium (58.3%) – Success on rolling 7 or lower on 2d6 (if your skill is equal to the difficulty level)
- Hard (16.7%) – Success on rolling 4 or lower on 2d6 (if your skill is a single point lower than the difficulty level)
- Impossible (0%) – Automatic Failure (if your skill is more than a single point lower than the difficulty level)

There are also resolution systems for non-skill actions, competitive actions, extended actions such as research, and use of specific powers and abilities using the core resolution system as a base. Difficulties range from 1 to 5, and sometimes higher for very difficult actions.

Players can also try to use their character's psychic abilities by utilising Zener cards (square, star, cross, wave or circle). If a player wants to use his character's psychic ability, perhaps to foretell the future, the player names one of the symbols; the gamemaster draws a number of cards corresponding to the character's psychic ability and turns them over. If one of the cards is the symbol predicted by the player, the psychic action succeeds.

=== Supplements ===
The first edition was well supported, with several supplements:

- The Aegis Handbook (1997) – Player's Guide to Aegis.
- The Hand Unseen (2002) – Player's Guide to the NDD, or Black Book.
- Nemesis (1999) – Grey sourcebook.
- Atlantis Rising (1998) – Atlantean sourcebook.
- Exodus (1999) – Saurian sourcebook.
- Forsaken Rites (1997) – Supernatural sourcebook.
- Shadows of the Mind (1999) – Psi sourcebook.
- Cryptozoology (1997) – Dossier of the Unexplained.
- Sub Rosa (1999) – Conspiracy Creation sourcebook.
- Gamemaster Screen (1996) – with adventure module included.

==== Bodyguard of Lies ====
This series of supplements collected new mechanics, characters options and adventures and was presented in a Half-Letter sized format:

- Psi Wars (1998) – Introduces Dreaming, New Creditials, Trait and Resources, Alternate Weapon Ranges, Compilation of Alien Technology Resource Points and Psionics, New Informational Sources, Fear and insanity Rules, Manifestations, Biological, chemical, and radioactive menaces. The majority of the supplement is Psi-Wars, a complete Conspiracy X scenario.
- Mokole (1998)
- Synergy (1999) – Introduces Rules for Toxins and Poisons. The majority of the supplement is Synergy, a complete Conspiracy X scenario.

Prior to the release of the Bodyguard of Lies supplements, a short-lived series of newsletters using the same moniker was also published by Eden Studios.

== GURPS Edition ==
A GURPS edition of the Conspiracy X rules-set version was published in 2002. This was the second Powered by GURPS licensed game to be produced outside of Steve Jackson Games. In addition to GURPS rules it provided conversion guidelines for players of the first Conspiracy X. The GURPS variant is part of the "Classic" Edition line and features the same cover art.

== Second Edition (Conspiracy X 2.0) ==
Conspiracy X 2.0 was published in 2006 (features the Unisystem rules) and updated the setting to the early 2000s. This edition was nominated for an ENnie Award Best RPG for 2007. This edition presented conversion guidelines for players of the 1st Edition of the game (although no GURPS conversions are provided).

=== Supplements ===
After the release of Conspiracy X 2.0, a series of supplements collecting and updating content from early 1st Edition books were funded via Kickstarter:

- Extraterrestrials Sourcebook (PDF in May 2010, successful Kickstarter in November 2011 for a print edition) – Details the settings major extraterrestrial adversaries, collecting together background information from the Nemesis, Atlantis Rising and Exodus supplements and updating the mechanics to match 2nd Edition.
- The Paranormal Sourcebook (print and PDF editions via Kickstarter funding January 2012)
- The Conspiracies Sourcebook (print and PDF editions via Kickstarter funding July 2012).

== Reception ==
The game and its supplements were generally well received at the time of publication:

- Andy Butcher reviewed Conspiracy X for Arcane magazine, rating it a 9 out of 10 overall. Butcher comments that "Conspiracy X is the most impressive first roleplaying release in a long time, and it's a great game. It combines a setting and style that will be familiar enough for players and referees to easily understand with an incredibly detailed and atmospheric background, clear, simple rules and an impressive range of original and clever ideas."
- In the August 1996 edition of Dragon (Issue 232), Rick Swan characterized the first edition of this game as "the latest entry in the Aliens Walk Among Us sweepstakes, and it’s also the best." Swan criticized the combat system, which he found overly complicated for a game that supposedly discourages combat in favour of investigation; but he admired the game concept called The Cell, where players must agree on the details of their base of operations. Swan also liked the use of the Zener Test for psychic abilities, calling it cool that "the character’s success depends on the player’s real-life 'psychic' powers. Neat, eh?" Swan, having only playtested the game through one adventure, was unwilling to give an unqualified recommendation. "But our introductory scenario revealed no serious flaws. More importantly, it generated a table-full of satisfied customers, hungry for more.
- Pyramid magazine reviewed Conspiracy X and stated that "Combining the best of Illuminati and Over The Edge with its own brand of twisted goings on, Conspiracy X provides a richly detailed world for the gamemaster to understand and the players to guess about."
- In a 1996 reader poll conducted by Arcane magazine to determine the 50 most popular roleplaying games of all time, Conspiracy X was ranked 23rd. Editor Paul Pettengale commented: "By far the best of the modern-day horror games inspired by The X-Files, Conspiracy X has a meticulously constructed background which combined reality and fiction to create a frighteningly plausible setting. Reading through the background is enough to spark ideas for scenarios and even whole campaigns. The rules are simple and quick, while still allowing for a fair degree of complexity, and feature a unique and interesting system for dealing with psychic powers. Excellent stuff."
- In 2001, Sarah Hollings published a review of the first edition of Conspiracy X for the on-line roleplaying magazine Places to Go, People to See. Hollings liked the game, but found some of the rules around dice rolling overly complicated. "The damage system is frightening. The words daunting and confusing also spring to mind... There are some really good ideas in the combat system, and the underlying concepts are not complex. However the rendering of these ideas into a game mechanic has resulted in a very complicated and clunky system, in places unworkably so." While calling for updated rules revisions to replace the ad hoc house rules most gamemasters would need to employ, Hollings nonetheless recommended the game, saying, "There is a lot to like in Con X, as a system, and as a world setting. Yes, the mechanic sucks in many ways; yes, it often borders on unplayable, but nonetheless the work needed to come to a workable understanding (read 'house ruleset') is ultimately worth it for the fun you can have."

== Reviews ==
- Shadis #25 (March, 1996)
- Backstab (Issue 2 - Mar/Apr 1997)
- Magia i Miecz (Issue 43/44 - Jul/Aug 1997) (Polish)
- Casus Belli #104
