= Eden Studios (game publisher) =

Game publisher

Eden Studios, Inc.
- Industry: Role-playing game publisher
- Founded: July 4, 1997
- Defunct: 2017
- Headquarters: Albany, New York, United States
- Number of locations: 2
- Key people: George Vasilakos, M. Alexander Jurkat, C.J. Carella, Ed Healy
- Products: Conspiracy X, All Flesh Must Be Eaten, CJ Carella's WitchCraft
- Website: www.edenstudios.net

Eden Studios, Inc. is an American role-playing game publisher founded in 1996 by George Vasilakos, M. Alexander Jurkat, and Ed Healy. Eden Studios is best known for Conspiracy X, the Buffyverse role-playing games, All Flesh Must Be Eaten, CJ Carella's WitchCraft and City of Heroes Roleplaying Game (an unreleased adaptation of Cryptic Studios' MMORPG City of Heroes).

== History ==
=== New Millennium Enterprises ===
In 1992, George Vasilakos founded Imagination Games & Comics, a hobby shop in Albany, NY, where he met M. Alexander Jurkat, a lawyer with an interest in roleplaying games. While visiting GenCon with friends, Vasilakos was inspired by the success of collectible card games (CCGs) such as Magic: The Gathering, and proposed they create a similar game. Jurkat suggested they adapt the 1990 indie roleplaying game Battlelords of the 23rd Century, written by Larry Sims, which he had worked on previously as an editor.

In 1995, a team of Vasilakos, Jurkat and three others launched Battlelords under the imprint New Millennium Entertainment (NME). By the time Battlelords was released, the CCG market had already become oversaturated due to the CCG craze, leaving NME with substantial debts. Despite initial success with the game, the company had printed too many cards, and could not recoup its costs.

In 1996, when the company was already struggling, New Millennium published the first edition of the roleplaying game Conspiracy X, a game of aliens and conspiracies loosely inspired by The X-Files television show. The game was popular, and especially so in the UK. Although Conspiracy X sold out its first print run in two weeks, NME ceased trading shortly afterwards.

=== Myrmidon Press ===
Formed as a small independent games studio in 1993, Myrmidon Press had published only two roleplaying games by the start of 1996: Manhunter (1993) and Cosmic Enforcers (1995). It had also produced Rifts: Manhunter (1994), a crossover of its first game with the Rifts universe and rules, which were owned Palladium Books. In May 1996, Palladium withdrew its license for Rifts from Myrmidon Press, prematurely ending the Rifts: Manhunter line.

Following Palladium's withdrawal of the Rifts license, Myrmidon's founder and editor-in-chief, C. J. Carella, said the press would continue with Cosmic Encounters but would also focus on his forthcoming game, WitchCraft. Influenced by the World of Darkness games and the supernatural creatures of the horror genre, WitchCraft was based on the premise that all the iconic monsters from books and film co-existed in the same world, hidden from humans. Its 1997 sequel, Armageddon, was set in a possible future of that world, against the backdrop of an apocalyptic war between Lovecraftian horrors, pagan gods, angels, and mythic creatures. Both games used the same rules engine, the Unisystem, which Carella had intended to disappear into the background during play.

After publishing Armageddon, Carella grew dissatisfied with the business side of Myrmidon Press, and in 1997 began trying to sell the rights to his games to another company. Vasilakos and Jurkat were fans of Carella's work with Rifts and GURPS, and initially discussed a possible Conspiracy X/WitchCraft crossover.

=== Founding of Eden Studios ===
Vasilakos closed Imagination Games & Comics in June 1997, so he and Jurkat could set up a designer-led games publishing company. With investment from Ed Healy, who later set up Adept Press, Jurkat and Vasilakos announced the formation of Eden Studios, Inc. on July 4, 1997. Healy suggested the name "Eden" because he saw working at a games studio as his paradise job. After joining Deloitte & Touche, Healy had to relinquish his ownership, leaving Jurkat and Vasilakos as sole partners.

Eden Studios announced it had acquired the rights to Conspiracy X on the same day it launched for business. It was able to produce a third printing of Conspiracy X and began publishing new supplements. In July 1998, Eden Studios also announced it had bought the exclusive rights to Carella's games. In 1999, the first of these was republished as CJ Carella's WitchCraft. Armageddon would be published on 2003 as Armageddon: The End Times.

While he remained Eden Studios' president in a part-time capacity, Vasilakos was offered a job at Last Unicorn Games (LUG) in 1999 and moved to California. On January 29 2000, Eden Studios announced that Bernie Trombley had stood down as Conspiracy X line developer, to be replaced by Susanne Johnson-Haggett. On January 25, 2001, John Goff took over as lead developer of the game.

=== All Flesh Must Be Eaten ===
In 2000, Vasilakos and artist Christopher Shy created the zombie toolkit roleplaying game All Flesh Must Be Eaten (AFMBE) using the Unisystem, which had become the studio's official house system. AFMBE was designed to provide support for a range of different zombie settings or "deadworlds". AFMBE used a new, smaller format (7" x 9"), which the press hoped would help it stand out in stores.

In support of the game, Eden also published a series of zombie anthologies under the AFMBE brand. These were edited by James Lower and featured authors such as Scott Edelman, Robin D. Laws, Scott Nicholson, and Thomas Piccirilli. Many of the stories received honorable mentions in the Year's Best Fantasy and Horror anthologies, and the books sold well through the book trade. The game quickly became Eden Studios' flagship game, even outselling Conspiracy X, and was buoyed by the later zombie renaissance started by 28 Days Later and The Walking Dead. That year, they also published their first and only video game, Rail Empires: Iron Dragon, based on the popular fantasy game Empire Builder from Mayfair Games.

=== d20 and GURPS ===
During the height of the d20 System license, Eden Studios published a small number of Dungeons & Dragons-compatible roleplaying adventures and supplements with Matthew M. Colville as lead developer. Starting with David Chart's Akrasia: Thief of Time (2001), Eden Studios published a trilogy of short adventures (or "vignette books") under the Open Gaming License, under the press' new Odyssey imprint. This Eden Odyssey trilogy was set in the Studios' own proprietary setting, called Eden. The second book, Wonders Out of Time by Kevin Wilson, was published later the same year, although the conclusion would be delayed.

In 2002, Eden Studios published the d20 supplement Liber Bestarius: The Book of Beasts and M. Alexander Jurkat produced GURPS Conspiracy X in conjunction with Steve Jackson Games. In 2003, another d20 supplement followed: Fields of Blood: The Book of War. That same year, the Eden Odyssey trilogy was completed with the publication of Secret of the Ancients by C. J. Carella. This was followed by another d20 supplement, Waysides: The Book of Taverns (2004).

Through writer Christina Stiles, Eden Studios also collaborated with Bizarro Games on the print-on-demand d20 System game Odyssey Prime. This game, also delayed, eventually came out in 2006. In 2010, it was translated from d20 into the Unisystem for its re-release with Bizarro's successor, Misfit Studios.

Unlike their other books, the d20 books were intended to have single print runs, since it was easier for distributors to order new d20 titles than order from a publisher's backlist. The one exception was Fields of Blood: Book of War, which sold well and was reprinted based on the continuing demand.

=== Buffyverse ===
With help from Christian Moore of Last Unicorn Games, Vasilakos and Jurkat bid for the licence to produce a Buffy the Vampire Slayer role-playing game when they heard the current licensee of the Buffy the Vampire Slayer Collectible Card Game, Score Entertainment (part of Donruss Playoff LP), were looking for a publishing partner. Eden Studios announced it had acquired the licence to publish the Buffy the Vampire Slayer Roleplaying Game on December 21, 2001. Vasilakos and Jurkat initially vacillated over whether to use the popular d20 System or their in-house Unisystem for the game, but eventually decided on the latter and hired C. J. Carella to write a streamlined version of the rules, called the Cinematic Unisystem, to take advantage of the licensed game's mass-market appeal.

The game was released at GenCon in the summer of 2002, and was initially more successful than the studio's own All Flesh Must Be Eaten. The game allowed Eden Studios to move into offices and have salaried staff, including new staff members Ross Isaacs (editorial) and Alexandros Vasilakos (web design). Vasilakos also opened a new games store, Zombie Planet. Buffy was followed by the Angel Roleplaying Game in 2003 and the Army of Darkness Roleplaying Game in 2005. Angel initially outsold Buffy and Army of Darkness initially outsold both.

=== New games ===
Despite delays during the studio's work on Buffy and Angel, 2003 was Eden's most successful year. Also using the Cinematic Unisystem rules, Terra Primate was published in 2003 as a variant on All Flesh Must Be Eaten—swapping zombies for intelligent apes, and "deadworlds" for a variety of "ape worlds". The 2003 reissue of AFMBE featured d20 System conversions alongside the Unisystem, and the game also had a number of new releases, including a zombie bestiary, setting books, and another anthology.

As Buffy the Vampire Slayer came off the air in 2003, Eden also attempted to diversify its output. As well as releasing card games, it launched Eden Studios Presents, a magazine which provided additional rules and fiction for its games. Eden Studios also planned to publish Beyond Human, a toolkit game like AFMBE but focused on superhuman and inhuman characters, which Jurkat said would be the closest thing to a generic Unisystem game.

As the RPG industry contracted in 2005, the costs of licensing the Buffyverse properties became a financial strain. By 2005, M. Alexander Jurkat was no longer a co-owner of the company, and would leave altogether by 2006. Jurkat went on to edit for Margaret Weis Productions and Wizards of the Coast, and Eden Studios returned to a smaller team, consisting of Vasilakos and a number of freelancers.

Due to the cost of the licences, Eden Studios decided not to continue with the Buffy and Angel games in 2006. Instead, Eden Studios published the second edition of its first game, Conspiracy X 2.0. This time, British writer David F. Chapman was hired as line developer on a freelance basis. Chapman had pitched a new version of the game converted to the Unisystem rules, and updates to factor in the changes to the American security services after 9/11. Rather than using the new Cinematic Unisystem rules used in Buffy and Angel, Chapman reworked the game to use a version of the original, so-called "Classic" Unisystem rules.

For AFMBE, the studio published a compendium of 20 new deadworlds in Worlds of the Dead. It also partnered with Misfit Studios to release Odyssey Prime and Armageddon's monster manual Enemies Archived through PDF and print-on-demand. Odyssey Prime is a science fiction setting in which players attempt to save the planet from a projected asteroid impact, using interdimensional travel developed in secret by the American and British governments. Odyssey Prime was followed by an adventure, Southern Discomfort, on June 24, 2006.

=== 2007–present ===
As freelancers, David Chapman line-edited Conspiracy X and Thom Marrion line-edited CJ Carella's WitchCraft and All Flesh Must Be Eaten. In 2008, Eden published Ghosts of Albion (with a second edition in 2011): a Cinematic Unisystem game of Victorian era fantasy co-created and co-written by Tim Brennan and former Buffy star Amber Benson. From 2011 to 2013, Eden Studios also crowdfunded several Conspiracy X titles through Kickstarter: The Extraterrestrials Sourcebook (2011), The Conspiracies Sourcebook (2012) and Band of Zombies (2012). As Vasilakos' store, Zombie Planet, became more profitable than Eden Studios, the latter eventually became inactive.

== Games ==
- Abduction: The Card Game
- Adventure Maximus
- All Flesh Must Be Eaten
- Angel Roleplaying Game (Origins Award winner for Roleplaying Game of 2003)
- Armageddon: The End Times
- Army of Darkness Roleplaying Game
- Beyond Human (unpublished)
- Buffy the Vampire Slayer Roleplaying Game
- CJ Carella's WitchCraft
- Conspiracy X
- Eden Odyssey (d20 system)
- Eden Studios Presents (magazine)
- Ghosts of Albion Roleplaying Game, based on the Ghosts of Albion property
- Knights of the Dinner Table: HACK! (card game)
- Rail Empires: Iron Dragon (video game)
- Terra Primate

== Books ==
- Prometheus Unwound, Matt Forbeck (Origins Award winner for Best Game Related Short Work 2001)
- Book of Final Flesh (Origins Award winner for Long Fiction 2003)

== See also ==
- C. J. Carella
- Unisystem, the role-playing game system used in many Eden Studios roleplaying games
- Wonders Out of Time
