= Teenage Mutant Ninja Turtles & Other Strangeness =

Role-playing game based on the comics

Teenage Mutant Ninja Turtles Role-Playing Game
- Designers: Erick Wujcik
- Publishers: Palladium Books
- Years active: September 1985 – January 2000
- Genres: Science fiction, superhero
- Systems: Megaversal

Teenage Mutant Ninja Turtles & Other Strangeness
- Cover art by Kevin Eastman
- Author: Erick Wujcik
- Illustrator: Peter Laird, Kevin Eastman
- Cover artist: Kevin Eastman
- Language: English
- Publication date: September 1985
- Publication place: United States
- Media type: Print (paperback)
- Pages: 112
- ISBN: 978-0-916211-14-1
- Followed by: Teenage Mutant Ninja Turtles Adventures

Teenage Mutant Ninja Turtles & Other Strangeness (TMNT) is a present-day comic-book role-playing game published by Palladium Books in 1985 that is based on the Teenage Mutant Ninja Turtles comic book created by Kevin Eastman and Peter Laird and published by Mirage Comics the previous year.

== Description ==
TMNT is a role-playing game in which the players take on the roles of anthropomorphic animals that have mutated and become self-aware, taking on human characteristics and interests. The game uses Palladium's Megaversal system first developed for Palladium Fantasy Role-Playing Game and Heroes Unlimited in 1983.

=== Character generation ===
Character generation is completely random, and uses a long list of animals; some species have different varieties (most notably dog breeds). Other random determinations are

- The reason for the animal's mutation (which can be due to a variety of causes both natural and man-made.)
- The animal's mutations (intelligence, human looks, functioning hands, bipedalism, psionic powers, etc.)
- Educational background.

There are also rules for the creation of new animals not mentioned in the rules.

==== Mental disorders ====
A section of character generation details a comprehensive list of mental illnesses ostensibly drawn from the Diagnostic and Statistical Manual of Mental Disorders. Players can either select a form of insanity as an optional step in character creation or randomly assign one during the course of gameplay as a result of their characters undergoing some kind of trauma, such as demonic possession, near-death experience, or torture. This section also features an extensive list of sexual deviations which included pedophilia and homosexuality, with the idea that a traumatic event could potentially induce a character to convert from one sexual orientation to another.

After parents of younger players objected to the list of sexual deviations – which had previously appeared in the Palladium Role-Playing Game and Heroes Unlimited rulebooks – and pointed out that homosexuality had been officially declassified as a mental illness more than a decade before, Palladium Books responded by covering the section with a plain white sticker. Subsequent printings removed the list of mental illnesses entirely.

=== Campaign setting ===
The mutant animal player characters live in the modern world, functioning on the fringes of human society. The rules mirror the universe of the contemporaneous TMNT comic books and provide statistics for the original Turtles, as well as The Shredder and other early characters. However, the adventures included in rule the book are completely independent of the TMNT universe, and brand-new characters are introduced.

=== Alignment ===
The alignment system uses qualitative terms like "principled" and "miscreant" along with a list of diagnostic behaviors such as "would kill an innocent bystander" or "would never accept stolen property".

== Publication history ==
Teenage Mutant Ninja Turtles was created by Kevin Eastman and Peter Laird and first published by Mirage Comics in 1984 as a fringe comic. The following year, Palladium Books agreed to publish Eastman's and Laird's comic as a role-playing game, which was developed by Erick Wujcik. The result, Teenage Mutant Ninja Turtles & Other Strangeness was released in 1985 with cover art by Eastman, and interior art by Eastman and Laird.

In 1986, Palladium released After the Bomb, an alternate post-apocalyptic setting where the earth is populated mainly with mutant animals and residual humans. This developed into a separate, though compatible game series.

TMNT enjoyed sales of 50,000 copies per year, until the introduction of the TMNT television series in 1987 and the related live-action movies. These made considerable changes to the Turtles' universe, and had a severe negative impact on the popularity of the role-playing game. As Palladium's Kevin Siembieda noted in an interview, TV and movie depictions of the Turtles made them seem so childish that "no self-respecting teenager, even if he thought the Turtles were cool, or thought the Ninja Turtle game was cool, was going to be caught dead playing it. So our sales plummeted from 50,000 copies in a year to 12,000, and the next year that dropped to 6,000." Critic Paul Pettengale also commented, "Because the TV show and films reduced the TMNT phenomenon from cult status to mainstream, the popularity of the game rapidly diminished."

In late 1997, Palladium announced that a second edition of the game would be released. However, due to the cost of maintaining the license as well as delayed production and low pre-orders for the proposed title, Palladium decided not to move ahead with the project, and ended its license with Mirage Studios in January 2000. In 1998, a summary of the distinct rules outlining the basics of creating mutant characters and providing a short list of animal options was incorporated into the second edition of Heroes Unlimited.

In a February 2007 interview, Siembieda hinted that Palladium might consider re-licensing the property depending on the performance of the CGI movie and other factors, but nothing further was done.

In October 2023 Palladium announced that they would be releasing a reissue with the help of Kickstarter. The goal was subsequently met, and books were shipped in late 2025.

In October 2026 Palladium announced that they would not renew the Ninja Turtles license.

=== Supplements ===
- Teenage Mutant Ninja Turtles Adventures (June 1986) – a supplement consisting of five adventure scenarios.
- A Teenage Mutant Ninja Turtle Supplement: After the Bomb® (January 1986)
  - A Teenage Mutant Ninja Turtle Supplement: Road Hogs (October 1986) - "After the Bomb® Book Two"
  - Mutants Down Under (June 1988) - "After the Bomb® Book Three"
  - After the Bomb® Book Four: Mutants of the Yucantan (July 1990)
  - After the Bomb® Book Five: Mutants in Avalon (January 1991)
  - Mutants in Orbit: An adventure & sourcebook for After the Bomb® & Rifts® (March 1992)
- Teenage Mutant Ninja Turtles Guide to the Universe (May 1987)
- Transdimensional Teenage Mutant Ninja Turtles (April 1989)
- Truckin' Turtles (November 1989)
- Turtles Go Hollywood (March 1990)

== Reception ==
Marcus L. Rowland reviewed Teenage Mutant Ninja Turtles and Other Strangeness for the British role-playing magazine White Dwarf #79, and stated that "the comics pretend to take themselves very seriously. To reflect this, the style of play is completely deadpan, setting intelligent and deadly animals against a background of urban terrorism, gang warfare, juvenile delinquency and random violence." Four issues later, Robert Neville reviewed the first set of five TMNT adventures published, and noted "TMNT has been one of the surprise hits of the last year, with multitudes of gamers snapping up copies of the rulebook as fast as importers can freight them over to the UK." Davis found the first four adventures too short, and very similar in plot. However, the final adventure, "The White Ronin", was judged to be "the best reason for buying this book ... Actually it's all pretty silly stuff, but it's conveyed in exactly the same po-faced style as the comic, and is thoroughly entertaining."

In Issue 44 of Different Worlds, Scott Dollinger commented, "What is unusual is that [the designers] have not taken the easy route to fast money ... Instead they have maintained the high quality of the comic by licensing the characters to a smaller but well respected gaming company that takes their time and produces and excellent product ... The rules themselves have achieved a nearly perfect balance between thoroughness and playability." Dollinger found a few flaws in the game, such as the lack of a sample character sheet, but concluded by giving the game a very high rating of 4.5 out of 5.

In Issue 2 of the game magazine Gateways, Kevin Kreese noted the "well organized rule system through which you may enter the ninja turtle universe. Actually, it is flexible enough to encompass any number of combinations of mutant animal worlds." Kreese also noted that the adventures that followed its publication "are intelligently planned and allow the players great latitude in roleplaying."

In Issue 37 of the French games magazine Casus Belli, Ryan Dark noted that although the rules allowed crossover with Palladium's Heroes Unlimited, "Personally, I find that T.M.N.T. is self-sufficient and already rich enough that you don't immediately feel the need to add additional rules, powers and characters." Dark concluded, "Between the police investigation game and the superhero game, T.M.N.T. is an excellent game

In his 1990 book The Complete Guide to Role-Playing Games, game critic Rick Swan thought this game "is equally sophisticated and just as fun [as the original comics]." Swan admired many parts of this game including the "excellent rules for psionics and combat", the five included scenarios and the many humorous illustrations. Swan concluded by giving this game an excellent rating of 3.5 out of 4, saying it "is a perfect blend of whimsy and adventure. Recommended to all role-players with an appreciation for the bizarre."

In 1996, more than a decade after the release of the game, Paul Pettengale gave a retrospective review in Issue 12 of the British games magazine Arcane, and commented about the very random character generation system that sometimes produced non-verbal player characters, saying, "You can imagine how much potential this had for farcical situations." Pettengale did admit that the rules were badly organized, writing, "The layout of the rulebook could have been clearer (the martial arts section was together with the skills rather than the combat)." Nevertheless Pettengale concluded, "it was a quick and easy game to learn, and the rules for character generation are good ... together with Paranoia, TMNT&OS was one of the most fun, and funny games I have played.", Two issues later, in Arcane's reader survey to determine the 50 most popular role-playing games, TMNT was ranked 36th. Pettengale commented, "The rules are badly laid out, but the principles are easy to learn and combat is fluid. So, fine on that score. It's a superbly fun game to play because of its quirkiness, and the fact that the post-apocalyptic setting has most of California under the ocean. Fantastic fun."

In his 2023 book Monsters, Aliens, and Holes in the Ground, RPG historian Stu Horvath noted, "TMNT & Other Strangeness appeals to players by translating a world unseen in the comics into a world that can be inhabited and explored." Horvath approved of the mutation rules, which he thought were the "star attraction" of the game. He went on to comment "This variety of choices coupled with an ambiguous alignment system gave TMNT & Other Strangeness a sense of freedom and maturity that few other games could match."
