= Mutants in Avalon =

- Front cover of Mutants in Avalon role-playing game sourcebook
- Author: James Wallis, Kevin Siembieda
- Illustrator: Larry MacDougall
- Cover artist: Kevin Fales
- Language: English
- Series: After the Bomb RPG
- Genre: Post-apocalyptic science fiction
- Publisher: Palladium Books
- Publication date: January 1991
- Publication place: United States
- Media type: Print (paperback)
- Pages: 80
- ISBN: 978-0-916211-47-9
- Preceded by: Mutants of the Yucatan
- Followed by: Mutants in Orbit

Mutants in Avalon is the fifth supplement for the After the Bomb role-playing game, originally based on and compatible with Teenage Mutant Ninja Turtles & Other Strangeness. It was published by Palladium Books in January 1991 and uses the Palladium Megaversal system.

== Publication history ==
James Wallis was introduced to Kevin Siembieda of Palladium by Erick Wujcik at GenCon 22 in 1989, which led to Wallis producing role-playing game supplements beginning with Mutants in Avalon (1990).

== Setting ==
The storyline of After the Bomb introduced a post-nuclear warfare setting, centered on the Eastern United States, where most of the area is populated by mutated animals and they form the predominant societies, as opposed to the setting of Teenage Mutant Ninja Turtles & Other Strangeness where mutants live on the fringes of human society. Mutants in Avalon expands that setting to include Great Britain which is divided into eight neo-feudal kingdoms. The sample plot presented concerns the rise of a new King Arthur and Knights of the Round Table, composed of mutant animals, as well as the threat of pro-human invasion by the organization SAECSN.

The book includes rules on class as a factor in character generation, druidic magic, and a number of new mutant insects as riding beasts and pets.

== Reviews ==
- GamesMaster International Issue 1 - Aug 1990
- GamesMaster International (Issue 9 - Apr 1991)
