= Revised RECON =

The Revised RECON
- Front cover of The Revised RECON, illustrated by Kevin Siembieda
- Designers: Erick Wujcik, Kevin Siembieda, Matthew Balent, Maryann Siembieda
- Publishers: Palladium Books
- Publication: June 1986 (1st edition); April 1999 (Revised edition)
- Years active: 1986–present
- Genres: Modern military
- Website: palladiumbooks.com

Revised RECON is a 1986 role-playing game supplement published by Palladium Books for Recon.

== Contents ==
Revised RECON is a supplement in which a comprehensive update presents rules revised and expanded rules, and features a fully illustrated section on military hardware and equipment, rules for creating and playing mercenary characters, several adventure scenarios, and guidance for integrating characters into other game settings.

Whereas RPG Inc.'s version had only limited information regarding firearms, the Palladium edition has almost 40 pages of gun statistics as well as fully illustrated, detailed descriptions of aircraft, seacraft, and vehicles, rules for playing mercenaries, rules for small arms and heavy weapons, garrote, bayonet, knives, and hand-to-hand fighting. This edition also includes several scenarios.

== Publication history ==
The Revised Recon was written by Erick Wujcik and published by Palladium Books in 1986 as a 152-page book.

After RPG, Inc. went out of business, Palladium Books acquired the intellectual property and released The Revised RECON, designed by Erick Wujcik, Kevin Siembieda, Matthew Balent, and Maryann Siembieda in 1986 as a 152-page book. The focus of the game was transformed from miniatures to a role-playing game. Thanks to its origins as a miniatures game, The Revised RECON is the only game from Palladium, aside from Valley of the Pharaohs (1983), that does not use the company's house Megaversal system. However, Palladium does provide conversion rules to bring play in line with the rest of their role-playing game series.

== Reception ==
Robert Neville reviewed The Revised RECON for White Dwarf #83 (1986), and did not like the game, commenting, "Unluckily, some people may well realise that the sections on military hardware and equipment are probably the best in any contemporary roleplaying game. Luckily, I hope people have more sense than to touch this with a bargepole. Unluckily, I'm not so sure they have."

Scott Dolinger reviewed The Revised Recon for Different Worlds magazine and stated that "The Revised Recon [...] includes information on fictional countries in where suitable adventures may occur with appropriate information on climate, terrain, political systems, and the state of the military in these nations. There are also fourteen 'Nam' adventures and two mercenary adventures provided in full detail making The Revised Recon a marvelous value."

In his 1990 book The Complete Guide to Role-Playing Games, game critic Rick Swan called the Revised Recon edition "a gem ... Recon does an impressive job of capturing the tension of jungle warfare fought under the most extreme conditions imaginable." Swan lauded the result, commenting, "It's all impressively researched, succinctly explained, and illustrated with detailed artwork." Swan's only issue was with the game's "narrow focus", which he felt "limits its appeal to mature players with an interest in the military". Swan concluded by giving this game an excellent rating of 3.5 out of 4, saying, "Recon is a prince of a game, easily the definitive treatment of its subject."
