= Mechanoid (disambiguation) =

A mechanoid is a robot designed to look and act like a human.

Mechanoid may also refer to:

- The Mechanoids, a 1991 comic book series adapted from The Mechanoid Invasion, a role playing game
- The Mechanoids, a 1985 role-playing game supplement for The Mechanoid Invasion
- Mechanoids, fictional characters in the 1985 video game Mercenary
- Mechanoids, fictional characters in the 2018 video game RimWorld

== See also ==
- Mechonoids, fictional robots from Doctor Who
- Mechanoid Army, a line of action figures by McFarlane Toys
