= Transdimensional Teenage Mutant Ninja Turtles =

1989 role-playing game supplement by Erick Wujcik

- Front cover of Transdimensional TMNT role-playing game sourcebook
- Author: Erick Wujcik
- Illustrator: James Lawson
- Cover artist: Kevin Long
- Language: English
- Series: Teenage Mutant Ninja Turtles RPG
- Genre: Science fiction
- Publisher: Palladium Books
- Publication date: April 1989
- Publication place: United States
- Media type: Print (paperback)
- Pages: 110
- ISBN: 978-0-916211-35-6
- Preceded by: Teenage Mutant Ninja Turtles Guide to the Universe
- Followed by: Truckin' Turtles

Transdimensional Teenage Mutant Ninja Turtles (also abbreviated to either Transdimensional Ninja Turtles or Transdimensional TMNT) was a supplement for the role-playing game Teenage Mutant Ninja Turtles & Other Strangeness which covered setting and rules information for both time travel and transdimensional travel.

== Publication history ==
Transdimensional Teenage Mutant Ninja Turtles was written by Erick Wujcik with a cover by Kevin Long and illustrations by James Lawson, and was published by Palladium Books in 1989 as a 112-page book.

== Contents ==
Transdimensional Teenage Mutant Ninja Turtles is a supplement of rules for travel to and adventures in other times and parallel worlds. The book includes lots of new mutants and mutations (such as mutant dinosaurs), rules for building and using time machines, ancient and black powder weapons, and magic.

== Time travel ==
=== Principles ===
The time travel system lays out a system of temporal physics that represents time as a "flowing tube" that spirals along in twists and the twists are themselves wrapped into coils. This model can be imagined by thinking of a telephone cord wrapped around a cylinder. Time travel is possible by leaving your current point in the tube and travelling either to a neighboring twist or any coil. Coils allowed time travellers to travel into the past by great leaps, to predefined years. The further in the past the coil, the greater the gap. The first few coils closest to present day are separated by thousands of years, coils further in the past were separated by millions and then billions of years. Roughly detailed in a few paragraphs, the coils go as far back as the beginning of the universe.

Twists vary in size depending on which coil was considered its home coil. In the present-day coil (based on 1988, when the game was published), twists were 125 years apart. So, from 1988, one could travel into the past year of 1863 or to the future year of 2113. From the new twist, the time traveller could potentially travel another 125 years, either to return home or move further away from their home time, to 1738 or 2238 respectively. There are rough details for past times with more detailed future times for the next millennia. These consist mostly of a variety of apocalyptic settings, ranging from Palladium's After the Bomb to robot massacres inspired by stories of artificial intelligences run amok, and a scant few more utopian settings.

There were no guidelines for what would happen if one travelled so far down successive twists as to cross into another coil; however, twists were so comparatively small that it is mechanically discouraged to travel by such means. It is easier to simply jump directly to the desired coil.

=== Time stream alterations ===
Changes to the past (or future) are dealt with using alternate branching time streams (i.e., immutable timelines). Changes to a given timeline would automatically put travellers into an alternate branch with the changes in place. If the travellers somehow change the past and then travel back to the future to reach their home time, their home time will consequently appear different to them, according to the changes that were put in place.

However, time stream changes were intended to be played with loosely. The sample adventure includes an instance where a player, while reading a history book, re-reads a section of the book and notices that there has been a change.

== Mutant animals ==
This book introduced extinct animal species, including a wide variety of dinosaurs and Pleistocene mammals. New size levels were added to allow for some of the massive sizes of dinosaurs. A new method of mutation was introduced as well, allowing for the addition of BIO-E ("Biological Energy") for travelling into the future, making evolutionary mutation towards sentience something of a temporal mandate. This meant dinosaurs and other ancient creatures taken into present day would automatically mutate given enough time.

This book also introduces the idea of mutant humans and features advanced psionic rules. Humans travelling into the future from an earlier era might also mutate. Humans could also remove hands, legs, or other features (those animal mutants usually must add to become more human-like) and potentially become smooth-skinned creatures with vestigial legs and arms that some evolutionary science fiction mused. By sacrificing default human attributes, humans could attain more powerful psionic phenomena, ranging from ectoplasmic arms and legs (to make up for a lack of them) and more powerful mental abilities not previously covered or available in the core rulebook.

== Reception ==
In the July 1989 edition of Games International (Issue 7), Paul Mason thought that this book would attract a certain type of player, saying, "If you turned to TMNT because you'd gone through D&D from Basic to Immortals and you were looking for more new gimmicks, then this will satisfy you. If on the other hand, you turned to TMNT because it was a quirky setting for a game with ample opportunity for extreme characterisation, then you might not be so keen." He concluded by giving this game an average rating of 3 out of 5, saying, "It succeeds admirably at what it tries to do. However, it will only be of interest to players of the TMNT game."

== Reviews ==
- GamesMaster International Issue 1 - Aug 1990
