= Truckin' Turtles =

1989 role-playing game supplement

- Front cover of Truckin' Turtles role-playing game sourcebook
- Author: Jape Trostle, Kevin Siembieda
- Illustrator: Thomas Baxa
- Cover artist: Kevin Long
- Language: English
- Series: Teenage Mutant Ninja Turtles RPG
- Genre: Superhero
- Publisher: Palladium Books
- Publication date: November 1989
- Publication place: United States
- Media type: Print (paperback)
- Pages: 48
- ISBN: 978-0-916211-43-1
- Preceded by: Transdimensional Teenage Mutant Ninja Turtles
- Followed by: Turtles Go Hollywood

Truckin' Turtles is a supplement for the Teenage Mutant Ninja Turtles & Other Strangeness role-playing game. It was published by Palladium Books in 1989 and uses the Palladium Megaversal system.

== Publication history ==
Truckin' Turtles was written by Jape Trostle, with a cover by Kevin Long and illustrations by Tom Baxa, and was published by Palladium Books in 1990 as a 48-page book.

== Contents ==
Truckin' Turtles is a road trip adventure composed of six linked scenarios set in locations across America featuring ninjas, mutant animals, supervillains, and Neo-Nazis.

== Description ==
Truckin' Turtles is largely a collection of adventure concepts that take the players across the United States, from New York to Silicon Valley with various wide-ranging themes. It explains mutants and their societies outside of the setting of the original rule book.

== Reception ==
GM Magazine noted the compatibility of Truckin' Turtles with any Palladium role-playing game. The review praised well planned-out encounters, the random tables for traffic for traffic conditions and hostile encounters, and the quality of the illustrations.

== Reviews ==
- Games Review Volume 2, Issue 5 - Feb 1990
- GamesMaster International Issue 1 - Aug 1990
