= Road hog =

Road hog or roadhog may refer to:

- an aggressive motorist, inclined to road rage
- Roadhog (Overwatch), a character in the multimedia franchise Overwatch
- Road hogs (stock car racing), an amateur style of stock car racing
- Road Hogs, a role-playing game supplement released in 1986
- Roadhog (fl. 2010s), a Thoroughbred racehorse; two-time winner of the Maryland Million Turf
- "Road Hogs", a 2002 song by Stone Sour from Stone Sour
