= Homeworld (disambiguation) =

Homeworld is a 1999 real-time strategy video game.

Homeworld or Home world may also refer to:

- The native planet of a given species/civilization in science fiction works featuring multiple inhabited planets
- Homeworld (series), a video game series
- Homeworld (novel), the 1980 first novel in the To the Stars trilogy by Harry Harrison
- Homeworld (Palladium), a 1982 role-playing game supplement for The Mechanoid Invasion
- Homeworld 81, a 1981 housing exhibition promoted by the Milton Keynes Development Corporation, England
- "Homeworld (The Ladder)", a 1999 song by Yes from The Ladder
- Homeworld, the homeworld of the alien Gems in the animated television series Steven Universe
- Predator: Homeworld, a 1999 science fiction comic storyline by James Vance, Kate Worley, Toby Cypress, and Mark Lipka
