= Turtles Go Hollywood =

1990 roleplaying game supplement

- Cover art by Kevin Long, 1990
- Author: Daniel Greenberg, Kevin Siembieda
- Illustrator: Kevin Long
- Language: English
- Series: Teenage Mutant Ninja Turtles RPG
- Genre: Superhero
- Publisher: Palladium Books
- Publication date: March 1990
- Publication place: United States
- Media type: Print (paperback)
- Pages: 48
- ISBN: 978-0-916211-46-2
- Preceded by: Truckin' Turtles

Turtles Go Hollywood is a supplement published by Palladium Books in 1990 for the comic superhero roleplaying game Teenage Mutant Ninja Turtles & Other Strangeness using the Palladium Megaversal system.

== Publication history ==
Turtles Go Hollywood was written by Daniel Greenberg with interior and cover art by Kevin Long, and was published by Palladium Books in 1990 as a 48-page book.

== Contents ==
Turtles Go Hollywood is a series of five linked scenarios set in Hollywood. The Turtles seek to stop a plot by the mutant villain Labb Ratt to use subliminal messages to brainwash moviegoers everywhere. It takes place directly after the Truckin' Turtles series of adventures.

== Reception ==
In the June 1990 edition of Games International (Issue 15), the reviewer said the presentation was poor, but that inside the cover, this was "a scenario far superior to the usual TMNT offerings." The reviewer liked the "level of subtlety demonstrated primarily by the relative lack of mindless fight scenes" as well as "the very open plot which encourages player creativity." The reviewer concluded that this was "easily the best TMNT scenario."

== Other reviews ==
- GamesMaster International Issue 1 - Aug 1990
