= Mutants of the Yucatan =

RPG supplement

- Front cover of Mutants of the Yucatan role-playing game sourcebook
- Author: Erick Wujcik
- Illustrator: James Dombrowski
- Cover artist: Kevin Fales
- Language: English
- Series: After the Bomb RPG
- Genre: Post-apocalyptic science fiction
- Publisher: Palladium Books
- Publication date: July 1990
- Publication place: United States
- Media type: Print (paperback)
- Pages: 48
- ISBN: 978-0-916211-44-8
- Preceded by: Mutants Down Under
- Followed by: Mutants in Avalon

Mutants of the Yucatan is the fourth supplement for the After the Bomb role-playing game, originally based on and compatible with Teenage Mutant Ninja Turtles & Other Strangeness. It was published by Palladium Books in July 1990 and uses the Palladium Megaversal system.

== Publication history ==
Mutants of the Yucatan was written by Erick Wujcik with a cover by Kevin Fales and illustrations by James Dombrowski, and was published by Palladium Books in 1990 as a 48-page book.

== Contents ==
Mutants of the Yucatan is a Central American After the Bomb! campaign setting that describes the mutant animals of the Yucatan (humanoid kinkajoos, sloths, anteaters, snakes, and flamingos), their tribes, their equipment, and the local humans.

== Description ==
It expands the game setting to cover Mexico's Yucatán Peninsula. It includes new rules for various mutant animals native to the area, including insects like army ants and birds like flamingoes, as well as snakes and bats. It also covers the Empire of Humanity, introducing new weapons and equipment and adventure scenarios based in swamps and jungles.

== Reception ==
- GamesMaster International Issue 1 - Aug 1990
- Mutants of the Yucatan was reviewed in the "MasterView" column in GamesMaster International Issue 4 - Nov 1990.
