= Teenage Mutant Ninja Turtles Guide to the Universe =

1987 role-playing game supplement by Erick Wujcik

- Front cover of Guide to the Universe role-playing game sourcebook
- Author: Erick Wujcik
- Illustrator: Kevin Eastman, Peter Laird, Ryan Brown
- Cover artist: Peter Laird
- Language: English
- Series: Teenage Mutant Ninja Turtles RPG
- Genre: Science fiction
- Publisher: Palladium Books
- Publication date: May 1987
- Publication place: United States
- Media type: Print (paperback)
- Pages: 48
- ISBN: 978-0-916211-25-7
- Preceded by: Teenage Mutant Ninja Turtles Adventures!
- Followed by: Transdimensional Teenage Mutant Ninja Turtles

Teenage Mutant Ninja Turtles Guide to the Universe is the second supplement for the science fiction superhero role-playing game Teenage Mutant Ninja Turtles & Other Strangeness, itself bases on the Teenage Mutant Ninja Turtles comic franchise. It was published by Palladium Books in 1987 and uses the Palladium Megaversal system.

== Description ==
The Teenage Mutant Ninja Turtles Guide to the Universe is a supplement that introduces an outer-space milieu for the TMNT role-playing game. The book contains:

- descriptions of various flying vehicles — helicopters, airplance and space ships — and rules for their use.
- Known space, and its main factions: The expansionist "Triceraton Republic" peopled by Triceratops; and the Human Federation, equally as expansionist.

The book also includes four short scenarios:

1. "Tigers of Tibet": PCs travel to Tibet to investigate a "Yeti" being chased by the army.
2. "The Mutant Mastering Mind Machine": The heroes confront a mad scientist and his evil invention.
3. "Day of the Transmat": Aliens seek aid against the Triceratons.
4. "Invasion of the Triceratons": The heroes fight the Triceratons.

The final pages have a comic adventure.

== Publication history ==
Palladium Books acquired the role-playing license for Teenage Mutant Ninja Turtles and published Teenage Mutant Ninja Turtles & Other Strangeness in 1985. They also published several supplements, the second being The Teenage Mutant Ninja Turtles Guide to the Universe in 1987, a 48-page book written by Erick Wujcik, with interior art by Kevin Eastman and cover art by Peter Laird.
