= The Palladium RPG Book 4: Adventures in the Northern Wilderness =

Role-playing game supplement

- Publisher: Palladium Books
- Publication date: 1989

The Palladium RPG Book 4: Adventures in the Northern Wilderness is a supplement published by Palladium Books in 1989 for the Palladium Fantasy Role-Playing Game.

== Contents ==
The Palladium RPG Book 4: Adventures in the Northern Wilderness is a campaign setting supplement and adventure scenario book which details the forested and mountainous regions of the northern wilderness and its empire of 12 barbarian wolfen tribes. The module had 96 pages and included information about the setting as well as six complete adventures.

== Publication history ==
Palladium Books published the Palladium Fantasy Role-Playing Game in 1983. The following year, they began to release regional adventure guides that contained information about specific regions of the continent on which the original game was set. As the title suggests, The Palladium RPG Book 4: Adventures in the Northern Wilderness was the fourth book in this series, released in 1989 as a 96-page book written by Thomas Bartold, Grant Boucher, Kevin Davies, Jeffrey Gomez, Kevin Long, Alex Marciniszyn, Kevin Siembieda, and Erick Wujcik, with a cover by Keith Parkinson.

This was followed in 1990 by Book V: "Further" Adventures in the Northern Wilderness.

In 1996, when Palladium published a second edition of Palladium Fantasy Role-Playing Game, the two "Northern Wilderness" regional guides were replaced by a new regional guide, Wolfen Empire, published in 2003.

== Reception ==
Stewart Wieck reviewed the product in the February–March 1990 issue of White Wolf. He called it an "excellent game supplement", rating it overall at a 4 out of 5 possible points.

== Reviews ==
- Shadis (Issue 4 - Aug 1990)
- Games Review Vol. 2, Issue 3 (December 1989)
- GamesMaster International Issue 1 - Aug 1990
