= Road Hogs =

- Front cover of Road Hogs role-playing game sourcebook
- Author: Erick Wujcik, Kevin Siembieda
- Illustrator: Walter Storozuk, Brent Carpenter, Kevin Siembieda
- Cover artist: Kevin Eastman
- Language: English
- Series: After the Bomb RPG
- Genre: Post-apocalyptic science fiction
- Publisher: Palladium Books
- Publication date: October 1986
- Publication place: United States
- Media type: Print (paperback)
- Pages: 48
- ISBN: 978-0-916211-20-2
- Preceded by: After the Bomb (1st edition)
- Followed by: Mutants Down Under

Road Hogs is the second supplement to the After the Bomb setting of the Teenage Mutant Ninja Turtles & Other Strangeness role-playing game. It was published by Palladium Books in October 1986 and uses the Palladium Megaversal system.

== Publication history ==
Road Hogs was written by Erick Wujcik, and was published by Palladium Books in 1987 as a 48-page book.

== Content ==
Road Hogs is an After the Bomb! supplement describing the postholocaust West Coast, including maps, new character rules, new animals, equipment and skills. The book focuses on vehicle combat, with a scenario and a comics story.

== Setting ==
The storyline of After the Bomb introduced a post-nuclear warfare setting centered around the eastern United States, where most of the area is populated by mutated animals that form the predominant societies, as opposed to the setting of Teenage Mutant Ninja Turtles & Other Strangeness where mutants live on the fringes of contemporary human society. Road Hogs expands that setting to include the western United States, which is largely controlled by vicious gangs of mutants in heavily modified vehicles, scavenging for their existence. It is reminiscent of the movie The Road Warrior.

The book outlines many new rules for the operation of vehicles and acquisition of resources in a bleak wasteland setting, as well as several adventure scenarios. These include road maps of Southern and Central California that indicate where the various factions and gangs occupying the region are located. Most of the civilized mutants and humans are located in what was previously known as Sacramento, California.

A short story was included with the book to give feel of environment the supplement provided. It involves the tale of an ancient, slightly senile turtle martial-arts master who wields a pair of sais, hinting that this character may in fact be Raphael. He also mistakes one of his students for "Mike". This suggests that he was one of the original Teenage Mutant Ninja Turtles.

The book is also noted for its original artwork by Teenage Mutant Ninja Turtles co-creator Kevin Eastman, which has not been reproduced in other books from Palladium.

== Reviews ==
- GamesMaster International Issue 1 - Aug 1990
