= Monsters & Animals =

- Publisher: Palladium Books
- Publication date: 1985

Monsters & Animals is a 1985 role-playing game supplement published by Palladium Books for Palladium Fantasy Role-Playing Game.

== Contents ==
Monsters & Animals is a supplement in which nearly 100 illustrated fantasy monsters are featured alongside more than 200 animals from both modern and prehistoric eras.

The second edition of Monsters & Animals is a supplement in which each bestiary entry generally includes an image and a habitat map. Traditional fantasy monsters are included along with original creations. The section on mundane animals integrates real-world facts with in-game utility. The second edition expands the original with more playable races and full compatibility with the Palladium Megaverse.

== Publication history ==
Monsters and Animals was written by Kevin Siembieda with Erick Wujcik and was published by Palladium Books in 1985 as a 166-page book.

== Reception ==
Lucya Szachnowski reviewed Monsters & Animals for Arcane magazine, rating it a 7 out of 10 overall, and stated that "Second edition Monsters & Animals is larger than the original version, has more optional player character races and is compatible with the entire Palladium Megaverse. Excellent value at [the price]."

== Reviews ==
- Asimov's Science Fiction
- Papyrus (Issue 12 - Gencon 1993)
- Dragon #242
