= Mutants Down Under =

- Front cover of Mutants Down Under role-playing game sourcebook
- Author: Erick Wujcik
- Illustrator: James Lawson
- Cover artist: Kevin Eastman
- Language: English
- Series: After the Bomb RPG
- Genre: Post-apocalyptic science fiction
- Publisher: Palladium Books
- Publication date: June 1988
- Publication place: United States
- Media type: Print (paperback)
- Pages: 48
- ISBN: 978-0-916211-34-9
- Preceded by: Road Hogs
- Followed by: Mutants of the Yucatan

Mutants Down Under is the third supplement to the After the Bomb setting of the Teenage Mutant Ninja Turtles & Other Strangeness role-playing game. It was published by Palladium Books in June 1988 and uses the Palladium Megaversal system.

== Publication history ==
Mutants Down Under was written by Erick Wujcik with art by Kevin Fales and James Dombrowski, and was published by Palladium Books in 1988 as a 48-page book.

== Contents ==
Mutants Down Under details an Australian campaign setting and scenarios for use with After the Bomb!, describing and mapping that continent after the holocaust. Mutants Down Under includes descriptions of over 20 new mutant animals, the Dream Time Sorcerer, and the evil Masters of Bio-Technology. The book also includes several miniscenarios.

== Setting ==
The game's story is set in a post-apocalyptic Australia, where mutant animals form the predominant societies. Tasmania is the bastion of technologically advanced civilization, while the mainland is largely under the sway of the aboriginal Dreamtime philosophy. Invading forces from Jakarta, composed primarily of human and mutant water buffalo forces, threaten both ways of life. It includes rules for many species of native Australian and Southeast Asian animals, as well as riding insects and various airships.

== Reception ==
Mutants Down Under was reviewed in Games Review Volume 1, Issue 2 - Nov 1988.
