= Hearts and Minds =

Hearts and Minds may refer to:

== Conflict ==
- Winning hearts and minds, the idea of persuading enemies instead of defeating them by force
- Hearts and Minds (Vietnam War), a strategy used by the South Vietnamese and United States governments
- Hearts and minds (Iraq), a US public relations campaign and 2004 congressional hearing during the Iraq War

== Film ==
- Hearts and Minds (film), a 1974 documentary film about the Vietnam War
- Hearts and Minds, a 1995 film featuring Danny Keogh

== Television ==
=== Series ===
- Hearts and Minds (1995 TV series), a British drama series
- Hearts and Minds (1996 TV programme), a 1996–2012 British current affairs programme

=== Episodes ===
- "Hearts and Minds" (Justice League)
- "Hearts and Minds" (Lost)
- "Hearts and Minds" (The Outer Limits)
- "Hearts and Minds" (That's So Raven)

== Other uses ==
- Star Trek: Deep Space Nine – Hearts and Minds, a Star Trek four-issue comic book limited series published by Malibu Comics (June–September 1994)
- Hearts and Minds (album), a 2000 album by Susannah McCorkle
- Hearts and Minds, a 2009 novel by Amanda Craig
- Hearts and Minds: The Untold Story of the Great Pilgrimage and How Women Won the Vote, a 2018 book by Jane Robinson
- Hearts & Minds (Recon), a 1983 role-playing game supplement
