= Advanced RECON =

Advanced RECON is a 1987 role-playing game supplement published by Palladium Books for Recon.

== Contents ==
Advanced RECON is a supplement in which the rules are expanded by introducing enhanced physical attributes and higher skill levels. and also includes encounter tables, along with detailed information on small-unit military tactics, and campaign background material focused on the Kingdom of Laos and five ready-to-play scenarios.

== Publication history ==
Advanced Recon was written by Erick Wujcik and published by Palladium Books in 1987 as a 48-page book.

Advanced RECON was the only other book published for The Revised RECON, released February 1987. It is an expansion of the rules allowing the creation of Special Operations characters and detailing a four-mission campaign set in 1960s Laos. There are also sections on American and North Vietnamese tactics and strategy, period electronic equipment, a primer on the game world in 1965, and briefings on the Kingdom of Laos and other military and government agencies.
