= Ninjas & Superspies =

Tabletop role-playing game

- watermarked front cover of Ninjas & Superspies Revised, illustrated by Kevin Fales
- Designers: Erick Wujcik
- Illustrators: Stephen R. Bissette, Denys Cowan, Angel Gabriele, Michael Gustovich, Kevin Long
- Publishers: Palladium Books
- Publication: 1984 (copyright); October 1987 (1st edition); August 1990 (Revised edition); 1995 (Mystic China); May 2000 (Revised Edition 7th printing); June 2001 (Mystic China 2nd Printing)
- Years active: 1987–present
- Genres: Espionage, martial arts
- Languages: English
- Systems: Megaversal
- Website: palladiumbooks.com

Ninjas & Superspies is a modern-day espionage role-playing game published in 1988 by Palladium Books that delves into martial arts as a form of combat.

== Contents ==
Ninjas & Superspies, written by Erick Wujcik, is designed around espionage and martial arts action in the modern world, similar to movies such as the James Bond series or Chinese martial arts films. To that end, the game contains game rules for martial arts and mystic powers alongside rules for playing spies with gadgets, cybernetics and other high-tech toys. Mystic China, the game's only published supplement, adds character classes, martial arts, and campaign material focused on Chinese traditional culture (Feng shui geomancers, Taoist priests, etc.).

== Gameplay ==
=== Character generation ===
Characters in Ninjas & Superspies may be members of a martial arts dojo, operatives for a government or private intelligence agency, soldiers involved in counter-intelligence, or even private eyes, depending on the selection of Occupational Character Class (O.C.C.). Each O.C.C. provides a base age which is modified by whatever combat training a character has and, in some cases, how long they have spent in prison. Most characters are highly skilled, with characters from the main book using the skill programs system to determine their skills, which provides a collection of related skills, and those from Mystic China using the O.C.C./Elective/Secondary skills method, which allows the selection of skills a la carte. Almost all characters have access to contacts from their backgrounds: martial arts characters may know people from competitions, secret agents may have worked with someone in the past, thief characters may have done time with certain people, etc.

=== Combat ===
While the game makes use of Palladium's Megaversal system, this game features a combat system that is far more detailed than in other Palladium games, containing more options for attack and defense to go along with the large number of martial arts offered. Instead of the standard four combat forms offered ("Basic", "Expert", "Assassin" and "Martial Arts"), Ninjas & Superspies has more than forty unique styles, with additional styles found in the supplement Mystic China. These are somewhat abstracted from "real" styles of the same names, attempting to maintain the feel of an individual style without necessarily showing every way in which it can be taught. Some martial arts have entirely unique forms of attack or defense, or unique powers, but most draw from the expanded list of standard maneuvers, combining them with martial arts powers to create the individual style.

Ninjas & Superspies also incorporates the idea of Chi, which is presented as a life-energy force which is present in the world and can be directed by trained individuals. This concept has been interpreted several times into other Palladium games, often as different aspects of metaphysical energy.

== Supplement ==
Ninjas & Superspies was created by Erick Wujcik and published by Palladium Books in 1988 with cover art by Kevin Fales, and interior art by Steve Bissette, Cowan, Gabriel, Michael Gustovich, and Kevin Long.

In 1995, Palladium published Mystic China, a 208-page softcover supplement also written by Erick Wujcik, with additional material by Kevin Siembieda, interior art by Vince Martin, Wayne Breaux Jr., Kevin Long, and Roger Petersen, and cover art by James Steranko. This supplement describes several new character classes such as the Demon Hunter, and provides details of subjects as diverse as Chinese checkers, economics and traditional ninja weaponry. Several locations are mapped and described in detail, such as the 20-room mansion of a book collector called "The Antiquarian". Rules on magic and psychic abilities are also included.

== Reception ==
Rick Swan wrote two reviews of the game:

- In his 1990 book The Complete Guide to Role-Playing Games, Swan commented that in the original game, "the martial arts rules receive the most comprehensive and coherent treatment ever presented in an RPG." Swan also noted that "Though the rules for cybernetics are entertaining ... they don't integrate convincingly with the martial arts rules, as if material for two different games had been crammed into the same book." Swan warned, "There are few guidelines for the referee, and the brief scenario outlines only hint at the game's possibilities." Swan concluded by giving the game a rating of 2.5 out of 4, calling it, "a must-buy for players interested in the topic."
- Seven years later, in Issue 223 of Dragon, Swan thought highly of the Mystic China supplement, giving it a top rating of 6 out of 6 and calling it "a virtuostic blend of fact and fantasy."
