= Clones in Space =

Tabletop role-playing game adventure

Cover art by Jim Holloway, 1986

Clones in Space is an adventure published by West End Games (WEG) in 1986 for the light-hearted science fiction role-playing game Paranoia .

== Plot summary ==
The Troubleshooters are tasked with tracking down a traitor who has left the Alpha Complex via a stolen space shuttle. Following her, the Troubleshooters eventually meet hostile aliens.

== Publication history ==
The humorous role-playing game Paranoia was first published by West End Games in 1984. Two years later, WEG published the adventure Clones in Space, a 48-page softcover book written by Erick Wujcik, with interior art by Brian Boerner, Kevin Wilkinsart, and Jim Holloway, and cover art by Holloway.

In the 2014 book Designers & Dragons: The '90s, game historian Shannon Appelcline noted that Erick Wujcik freelanced with West End Games, and that " Working with them, Wujcik wrote one of Paranoia's earliest adventures, Clones in Space (1986), and also contributed to the Acute Paranoia (1986) supplement."

== Reception ==
In the September 1986 edition of White Dwarf (Issue #81), Fiona Lloyd liked the solo section designed for referees to get a feel for the adventure, and thought the group adventure was both fun and exciting. She pointed out that with all the player-characters and their clones crowded into one shuttle, "one extremely fragile basket," some referees might be tempted to kill them all off in one explosion. She also questioned why the aliens weren't allowed to follow the Troubleshooters back to the Alpha Complex, which might have led to further "interesting encounters." She concluded with a strong recommendation, saying, "Despite these niggles, Clones in Space is a fun adventure, and well worth adding to your collection if you run a Paranoia campaign. Thank you for your cooperation."

== Reviews ==
- Casus Belli #39 (Aug 1987)
- Jeux et Stratégie #46
