= FutureWorld (Milton Keynes) =

FutureWorld was a housing exhibition held in Milton Keynes in June and July 1994 demonstrating new trends and technologies in housing. The exhibition was open air and included a number of completed houses that were sold after the exhibition and are now part of housing area in Milton Keynes.

FutureWorld was the third housing exhibition in Milton Keynes, following Homeworld 81 in 1981 and Energy World in 1986. A site was selected in Kents Hill near the Open University and was sponsored by National House Building Council.

== Exhibits ==
The outside exhibition featured 36 houses, some from national homebuilders to very specialist examples. Some notable houses include:

- British Steel House, TBV Architects
- Radiant House, Richard Weston
- Stuart House (timber framed), by Jonathan Ellis-Miller
