= The Palladium Book of Weapons and Assassins =

The Palladium Book of Weapons and Assassins is a 1983 role-playing game supplement published by Palladium Books.

== Contents ==
The Palladium Book of Weapons and Assassins is a supplement in which historically grounded material is presented on assassin orders. It focuses on three classical groups: Japan's Ninja, the Middle Eastern Order of Assassins, and India's Thugs. Each is explored in depth, including their clothing, poisons, tools, and infiltration tactics. The booklet avoids game mechanics, making it adaptable to any system, and presents its content without embellishing the assassins with supernatural traits. A bibliography is included for further study.

The Palladium Book of Weapons and Assassins offers a heavily illustrated exploration of historical assassin groups such as the ninja and the Thugs. It delves into their organizational structures, distinctive costumes, weaponry, and armor.

== Publication history ==
The Palladium Book of Weapons & Assassins was written by Erick Wujcik with art by Michael Kucharski and published by Palladium Books in 1983 as a saddle-stitched 48 page book for its first printing, and thereafter published as a square-bound book.

== Reception ==
Jerry Epperson reviewed The Palladium Book of Weapons and Assassins for Fantasy Gamer magazine and stated that "Overall, Weapons and Assassins is an excellent source of assassin material. It fits nicely into any game system as there is no mention of 'characteristics' and no attempts are made to describe these orders in game terms. Those who would like to have a good working knowledge of Thugs, Order of Assassins, or Ninja could do a lot worse than pick up this book. A good investment."

== Reviews ==
- Polyhedron #81
