= Palladium RPG Book 7: Yin-Sloth Jungles =

Palladium RPG Book 7: Yin-Sloth Jungles is a 1994 role-playing supplement for Palladium Fantasy Role-Playing Game published by Palladium Books.

== Contents ==
Palladium RPG Book 7: Yin-Sloth Jungles is a supplement in which the southern portion of the world and its massive jungle are detailed.

== Reception ==
Charles Peirce reviewed Yin-Sloth Jungles in White Wolf Inphobia #57 (July, 1995), rating it a 3.5 out of 5 and stated that "With the exception of the new classes, skills and magic items, I'm skeptical about the value of this product. It helps detail the Palladium RPG world and contains the occasional interesting idea, but I can't help but imagine a better product."

== Reviews ==
- Australian Realms #22
- The Familiar (Issue 3 - Apr 1995)
