= Standard Assessment Procedure =

UK system of energy rating for homes

The Standard Assessment Procedure (SAP) is the UK government's recommended method system for measuring the energy rating of residential dwellings. The methodology is owned by the Department for Energy Security and Net Zero, and produced under licence by BRE. The first version was published in 1995, and was replaced by newer versions in 1998, 2001, 2005, 2009, 2012, and 2021. It calculates the typical annual energy costs for space and water heating, and, from 2005, lighting. The CO_{2} emissions are also calculated. The SAP ratings start at 1, with dwellings that have SAP ratings >100 being net exporters of energy.

SAP 10.2 has been used as the basis for checking new dwellings for compliance with building regulations in the United Kingdom requiring the conservation of fuel and power since 2022 for England, Wales and Scotland.

A reduced data version of SAP, RDSAP, is used for existing dwellings. SAP or RDSAP was used to produce the energy report and Energy Performance Certificate in Home Information Packs (HIPs). A document was published by the UK government in 2007, looking towards SAP and energy standards in the future.

A number of comparisons have indicated that SAP does not provide an accurate model for low-energy buildings.

The Standard Assessment Procedure evolved from the National Home Energy Rating scheme, which was based upon the Milton Keynes Energy Cost Index created for the Energy World demonstration buildings in the 1980s.

SAP 11 will be renamed as The Home Energy Model (HEM), and used for Building Regulations compliance to the Future Homes Standard from the middle of 2025.
