= Richard Weston (architect) =

English architect

Richard Weston (born 1953) is an architect, landscape architect, designer, author and former chair of architecture at Cardiff University. He is Director of Richard Weston Studio Ltd and Earth Images Ltd.

== Professional background ==
Weston was born in Leicester in 1953. He attended Wyggeston Boys Grammar School. He went on to study architecture at Manchester University, gaining a BA in 1975 and BArch in 1977. Supported by the Thouron Award, he attended the University of Pennsylvania (USA) to study landscape architecture, gaining an MLA (Penn) in 1979. From 1979 to 1982 he worked in practice and was appointed as a lecturer at the Welsh School of Architecture (WSA) in Cardiff. He subsequently taught at the Leicester and Portsmouth schools of architecture. In 1999 he returned to Cardiff University to teach as a professorial research fellow. In 2003 he was appointed to the chair of architecture.

In addition to his teaching at the WSA, he has been editor of arq (Architectural Research Quarterly, Cambridge University Press) and director of Richard Weston Studio Ltd and Earth Images Ltd.

Weston has been a researcher and author of numerous books and publications. Most notably, he is author of two award-winning books, a monograph on the architect Alvar Aalto and a study of the modernist movement titled Modernism.

He is the author of a book on the life and achievements of Sydney Opera House architect, Jørn Utzon, described by The Architectural Review as a "compendious monograph" and "an ambitious high-quality artefact". Utzon granted Weston unlimited access to his archives and himself, enabling the publication of the study.

== Architectural work ==
In 1992, Weston designed a glass roof to cover the sunken courtyard of a house built in a redundant water tank in Hampshire. Formed of stainless steel 'gutter trusses' whose profile, like a river, widens and deepens in response to the flow of water, and between them span laminated glass arches, with an interlayer to reduce heat gain from the sun.

Weston's interest in structural glass found dramatic expression in a house he built for himself as part of FutureWorld (an exhibition designed to provide the public with a glimpse of the way homes might operate in the 21st century) in Milton Keynes. The 5.5 tonne stressed-skin plywood roof of Radiant House is supported only by glass – a feat achieved in collaboration with engineer Mark Lovell.

In 2002, he entered two architectural competitions, taking the opportunity they posed to explore ideas. The first for the Royal Playhouse in Copenhagen (in collaboration with John Pardey Architects and eventually won by Lundgaard & Tranberg Arkitekter, who went on to build it) and the second for the Great Egyptian Museum in Cairo. Whilst it did not win, the proposal, consisting of a 230m limestone dome, was selected for publication by the judges and Weston's learning of the Egyptians' fascination with the stars later became an inspiration for the designs for his own house and studio in Sully, South Wales - although sadly this was to remain on the drawing board.

=== Competitions and buildings ===
- Grand Egyptian Museum (selected for publication), 2002
- Royal Playhouse, Copenhagen, 2002
- Finalist in two-stage open competition for National Wildflower Centre, Liverpool, 1997
- Finalist in two-stage open competition for Public Artwork, Hamilton, 1997
- Glass Roof for Howard Smith, Hampshire (pub. Architectural Review, 8/97)
- Radiant House, FutureWorld, Milton Keynes, 1994

=== One-man shows ===
- Robert Phillips Gallery, Walton on Thames, 2005
- Aberdare Museum 2006
- National Botanic Garden of Wales, 2007*
- National Waterfront Museum, 2007–08
- Oxford University Museum of Natural History, 2008*
- Utzon Center, Aalborg, 2008.

=== Architectural prizes ===
- Techniquest Millennium Award for Solar System Sculpture for Wales, 1998.
- American Institute of Architects International Book Award for Modernism, 1996.
- 2nd Prize, Letchworth Garden City Centenary landscape master plan, 1997.
- Sir Banister Fletcher Prize for 'architecture book of the year', for Alvar Aalto, 1995.
- Winner, 'Critics Competition' organised by the Architectural Review, 1987.

== Design work ==
Using high-resolution scanners and natural materials such as minerals and stones, in the early 2000s Weston began designing silk scarves in his garage in Dinas Powys. In 2005 he sponsored students at Newport Art College to use his designs in their end-of-year show. His ideas were presented at the 'Best of British Open Design Call' at Liberty of London (the world's leading retailer of scarves) and, since their debut on the shelves in 2010, have quickly established themselves as amongst Liberty's best selling lines.

In 2011 he appeared on the BBC product development show, Britain's Next Big Thing, where he was described by the Independent on Sunday as "the break out star".

The scope of Weston's work has been extended by the purchase, in September 2014, of an optical microscope, with publication in the USA (Vincent Mok in Maniac Magazine, May 2013, p58-9), Ukraine (in Russian in Salon magazine, September 2013, p82-7) and The Netherlands (Mark magazine, June/July 2014, p160-167), as well as in two books on textile design published in the UK, the first by Melanie Bowles, Digital Textile Design (Laurence King, 2012), the second, Simon Clarke's Print: Fashion, Interiors, Art (Laurence King, 2014).

== Publications ==
=== Books ===
- "Architecture Visionaries", Laurence King, 320p, 2015.
- 100 Ideas that Changed Architecture, Laurence King, 2011.
- Quartz, 64pp, Deukalion Press, 2007.
- Formations: images from rocks, 112pp, Deukalion Press, 2007.
- Plans, Sections and Elevations. Key Buildings of the 20th Century, 240p, Laurence King, 2004.
- Materials, Form and Architecture, Laurence King, 240p, 2003: second edition in preparation for publication in 2015.
- Utzon. Inspiration, Vision, Architecture, Edition Bløndal, 432p, 2002.
- The House in the Twentieth Century, 272p, Laurence King, 2002.
- Modernism, Phaidon Press, 240p, 1996.
- Alvar Aalto, Phaidon Press, 240p, 1995.
- Säynätsalo Town Hall, Phaidon Press, 62p, 1993.
- Villa Mairea, Phaidon Press, 62p, 1992.
- Schools of Thought, Hampshire C. C., 152p, 1991.

=== Other ===
- Regular contributor to complete works of Norman Foster.
- More than 100 articles in leading architectural and other journals and newspapers.

=== Broadcasts ===
- 'The Next Big Thing', 7-episode BBC2 series tracing development of new products including scarves made using images from minerals and rocks (to be broadcast April–May 2011)
- Sydney (Soap) Opera House, Uden Associates for C5, 13.8.00.
- Agenda 21, with Daniel Libeskind and Ken Yeang, BBC World Service, 23.4.00.
- In Our Time with Daniel Libeskind and Melvyn Bragg, BBC Radio 4, 25.3.99.
- Several appearances on Turning World with Jenny Murray and other radio programmes inc. 'Night Waves' on Radio 3.
