= Pennyland project =

Low Energy Building Experiment

Coordinates: 52°03′42″N 0°44′37″W

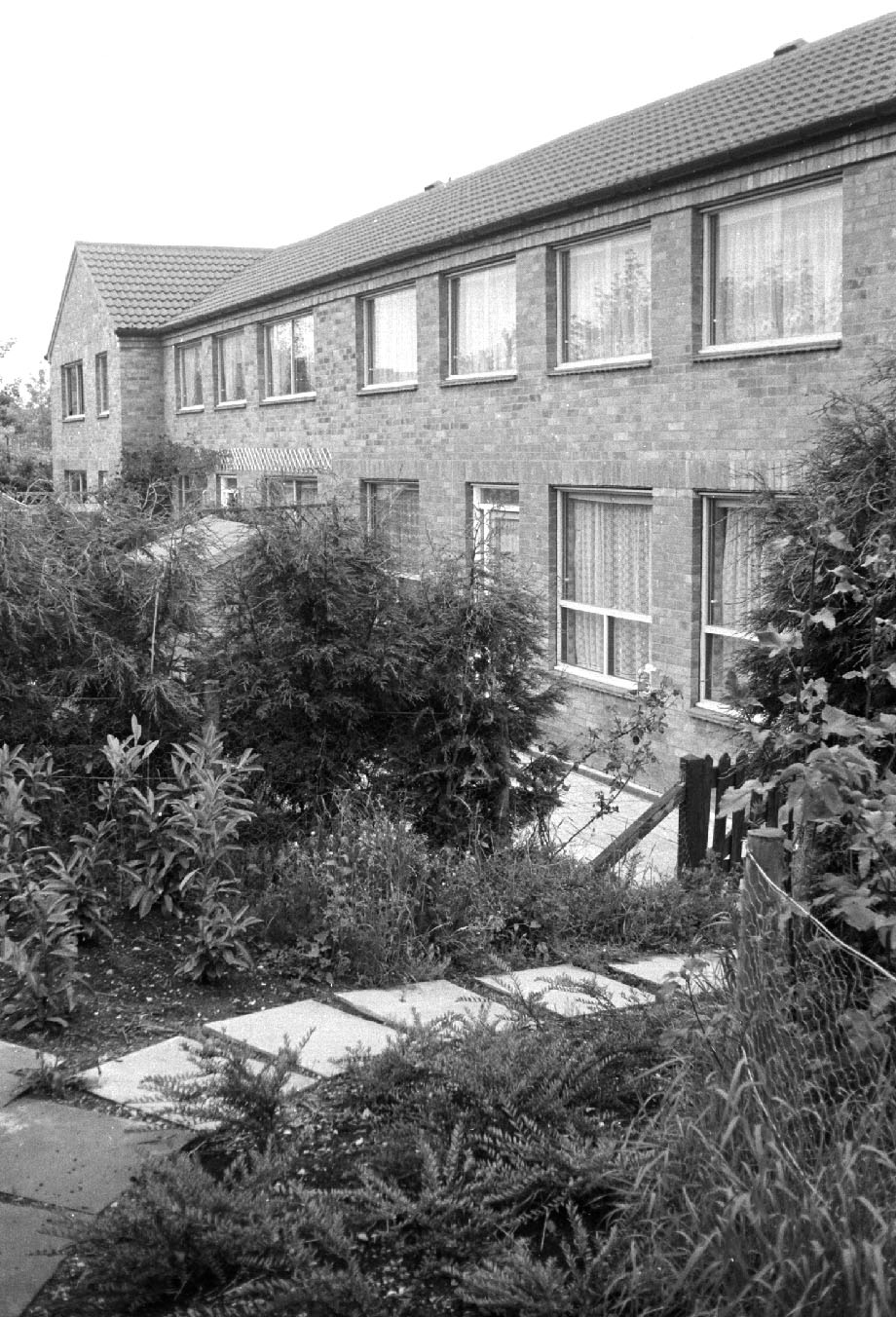
Pennyland houses, early 1980s

The Pennyland project was one of a series of low-energy building experiments sparked by the 1973 oil crisis. It involved the construction of an estate of 177 houses in the Pennyland area of Milton Keynes, Buckinghamshire, United Kingdom, (see Chapman, J. et al. (1985) below). It compared possible future UK building efficiency standards with newly introduced Danish ones.

Although identical externally, half the Pennyland houses (Area 1) were built to the proposed 1982 UK Building Regulations energy efficiency standards. The other half (Area 2) were built to the much more demanding 1977 Danish BR77 standard. (In Europe, BR77 and the Swedish SBN-80 standards set the benchmark for low-energy housing at the time.)

Sponsored by the UK Department of Energy, Department of Environment and Milton Keynes Development Corporation, and using the technical expertise of the Open University Energy Research Group, the houses were constructed during 1979 and 1980.

For comparison, two additional groups of control houses, already built in 1978, were studied on an adjoining estate at Neath Hill. A further small group of houses were built at Great Linford to the Pennyland Area 2 standards and used for more detailed tests (see Everett, R. et al. (1985) below). These were carried out with the help of the Electricity Council Research Centre and British Gas.

== Design ==
The Pennyland estate was laid out to take advantage of solar gain. The majority of houses faced south with the main living rooms located on the south side. They were designed with an insulated cavity wall with a poured concrete inner leaf to provide thermal mass. This had the added benefit of increasing airtightness. Nearly all were fitted with conventional radiator central heating systems.

Several levels of insulation, heating system efficiency and passive solar design were compared:

At Neath Hill most houses featured

- conventional 'heavyweight' gas boilers
- 50 mm roof insulation
- no cavity wall insulation
- Single glazing
- No floor edge insulation
- No special passive solar measures

About 20 of the Neath Hill houses were retrofitted with foam cavity fill wall insulation.

The Pennyland Area 1 houses featured:

- low thermal capacity gas boilers
- 80 mm loft insulation
- 50 mm cavity wall insulation
- Single glazing
- No floor edge insulation
- Passive solar layout and features

The Pennyland Area 2 houses (almost Danish BR77 standards) featured:

- low thermal capacity gas boilers
- 150 mm loft insulation
- 100 mm cavity wall insulation
- Double glazing
- 25 mm insulation under the edge of the floor slab
- Passive solar layout and features

== Lessons learned ==
The houses were monitored over the winters of 1981 and 1982 with energy and internal temperatures being measured in a large sample of houses on a weekly average basis. More detailed monitoring on an hourly basis was carried out on the Linford houses.

Among the lessons learned were:

- Overall, the Pennyland Area 2 houses demonstrated a halving in gas consumption for space and water heating compared to the 'normal' Neath Hill houses.
- The low thermal capacity gas boilers showed large energy savings compared to the conventional 'heavyweight' type.
- The poured concrete construction used at Pennyland made the houses extremely airtight.
- The overall package of energy conservation measures had a payback time of only four years.
- The passive solar features were popular, but the energy savings were modest, and their use constrained estate layout. The savings were limited by the use of net curtains and privacy considerations.
- The Pennyland houses suffered from minor mould growth in kitchens and bathrooms, a downside of the good airtightness.

== Impact ==
The short payback times encouraged Milton Keynes Development Corporation to introduce its own Building Regulation standards for new housing within the city leading to the major 1986 Energy World demonstration project and exhibition. These new standards were encouraged by the results of other previous energy projects carried out in Milton Keynes in conjunction with the Open University (see Fuller, S. et al. (1982) below).

The potential for housing retrofit insulation was explored in a later project in the city of York (see Bell, M. and Lowe, R.J. (1998) below).

The issue of mould growth in air-tight houses has since been tackled by Building Regulation requirements for specific ventilation in kitchens, bathrooms and toilets.

The levels of insulation tested at Pennyland and Great Linford in the early 1980s were only surpassed in the UK Building Regulation requirements in 2002.

In 2025, the impact of this project and other energy research work on UK building regulations was described in a 42 minute video 'Milton Keynes, Energy Capital UK?', produced by the Milton Keynes Living Archive project (see references below).

== See also ==
- Energy World
- Energy efficiency in British housing
- Energy use and conservation in the United Kingdom
- Sustainable development
- Energy conservation
- Passivhaus low-energy building standard
- Category:Low-energy building
