= The Haiphong H.A.L.O. =

1983 Vietnam War role-playing game adventure

- Designers: Joe F. Martin
- Publishers: RPG, Inc.
- Publication: 1983
- Genres: Vietnam War

The Haiphong H.A.L.O., subtitled "SOG Operations in North Vietnam" is an adventure campaign published by Role Playing Games, Inc. in 1983 for the Vietnam War role-playing game Recon.

== Plot summary ==
"H.A.L.O." (High Altitude, Low Opening) refers to the strategy of inserting a covert operative via a high-altitude parachute jump, which allows the operative to achieve a high velocity in free fall before opening the parachute at a low altitude, all in an attempt to avoid being spotted. In The Haiphong H.A.L.O., missions focus on H.A.L.O. operations by the SOG in Haiphong, North Vietnam, including reconnaissance, raiding, sabotage, assassination/ambush, prisoner snatching, and search and rescue. The book features 25mm scale tramp steamer deck plans. The campaign includes expanded rules for Army Special Forces, Navy SEALs, and Marine Force Recon commando characters, and detail real-world airborne, sea, and amphibious insertion techniques.

== Publication history ==
Recon is a role-playing game where players assume the role of American soldiers during the Vietnam War, created by Joe F. Martin and published in 1983 by RPG, Inc. A few adventures and supplements were released the same year, among them The Haiphong H.A.L.O., the first adventure for Recon. It was also written by Martin and was released as a tabloid-sized 4-page book.

== Reception ==
Dave Nalle reviewed The Haiphong H.A.L.O. for Abyss #24 and wrote, "this aid is a background resource, and it puts the ball in the gamemaster's court to set up the specifics of the mission, leaving lots of room for inventiveness, while providing the necessary supporting tools ... if you play modern RPGs, I would certainly recommend it."
