= After the Bomb (game) =

1986 Post-apocalyptic tabletop role-playing game

After the Bomb first edition
- Cover by Peter Laird
- Designers: Erick Wujcik; Matthew Balent
- Publishers: Palladium Books
- Publication: 1986; 40 years ago
- Genres: Post-apocalyptic science fiction
- Systems: Megaversal system
- ISBN: 0-916211-15-0

After the Bomb second edition
- Cover by Scott Johnson
- Designers: Erick Wujcik; Kevin Siembieda
- Publishers: Palladium Books
- Publication: 2001; 25 years ago
- Genres: Post-apocalyptic science fiction
- Systems: Megaversal system
- ISBN: 978-0-916211-15-8

After the Bomb is an post-apocalyptic role-playing game using the Megaversal system, written by Erick Wujcik, and published by Palladium Books in 1986.

== Setting ==
The storyline of After the Bomb introduces a post-apocalyptic setting centered on the Eastern United States, where most of the area is populated by the mutated animals that form the majority of society.

=== The apocalypse ===
Advancements in genetics brought the cost of genetic manipulation down to the point where it became consumer technology. Extensive, widespread experimentation in the creation of transgenic species resulted in the creation of mutated animals, possessing traits from other animals. Although the creation of transgenic humans was technically illegal, everybody possessed a complete human genome; thus, the law was largely unenforceable, and a small population of humanoid mutant animals slowly accumulated.

The same technology led to both the elimination of viral disease as a major problem, and the introduction of diseases as pranks. Kids would come to school with a vial of "homebrew" and infect the class as a joke. Because such diseases were easily cured, these pranks were regarded as "harmless".

Eventually, someone came up with a way to concoct an incurable disease. A virus was created which possessed an entire copy of a human genome; any cure that targeted the disease would also target the host.

This disease wiped out seventy-five percent of the world's human population. It infected most animals as well, and the animals that survived had human genes spliced in by the virus. These semi-human offspring displayed human characteristics in varying degrees. This would have merely resulted in a population mostly dominated by mutants if the leaders of the world's governments had not made the assumption that the disease was a bio-weapon sent by their enemies. The response from all sides was all-out nuclear warfare that devastated the entire planet.

The game can be assumed to take place a generation or two after this apocalyptic event, which is referred to as "The Crash" or "The Death".

== Supplements ==
Though the second edition of After the Bomb is a standalone with many updated rules and an entirely updated back-story, it remains compatible with the following previously released expansions:

- Road Hogs (October 1986) – Expands the setting to cover the west coast of the United States.
- Mutants Down Under (June 1988) – Expands the setting to cover Australia.
- Mutants of the Yucatan (July 1990) – Expands the setting to cover Mexico's Yucatán Peninsula.
- Mutants in Avalon (January 1991) – Expands the setting to cover Great Britain.
- Mutants in Orbit (March 1992) – A dual Rifts/After the Bomb title, it covers colonies in orbiting space stations, the moon and Mars.

== Changes since the first edition ==
The original edition of After the Bomb was a supplement to Teenage Mutant Ninja Turtles & Other Strangeness, a game released in September 1985. The changes between the two editions reflect two principles. First, by the year 2000, Palladium Books no longer held the rights to publish games based on the Teenage Mutant Ninja Turtles series, so an edition that included a completely new rule set had to be published. Second, the original back-story was updated to reflect over fifteen years of advances in genetics.

Included are expanded rules for the creation of mutants, including the ability to take animal disadvantages (vestigial traits) that enable one to purchase additional powers and/or human features. In addition, a new kind of mutant, the "purebred", has been introduced. Purebreds include creatures from well-established, stable bloodlines (as opposed to the essentially random mutations of most characters) and "chimeras", which are generally based upon transgenic creatures in existence today, such as spider goats.

== Reception ==
Marcus L. Rowland reviewed After the Bomb for White Dwarf #79, and stated that "It's all good fun, if you can accept the basic premises involved, but seems a little limited; I find the present-day setting of the original game more satisfactory, since it offers more opportunities for plot development and diversity."

Scott Dollinger reviewed After the Bomb for Different Worlds magazine and stated that "All the adventures in After The Bomb are particularly well-balanced between action, problem solving, and light hearted fun and the post-apocalyptic world introduced serves as a great source for new adventure ideas."
