= Sector 57 =

Tabletop role-playing game supplement

Sector 57 is a 1980 role-playing game supplement published by Detroit Gaming Center.

== Contents ==
Sector 57 features a scenario in which two astronauts will need to deactivate a well-guarded alien structure to prevent a massive explosion.

== Publication history ==
Erick Wujcik published the science-fiction adventure Sector 57 (1980) under the banner of the Detroit Gaming Center, of which he was the Director.

== Reception ==
Jerry Epperson reviewed Sector 57 in The Space Gamer No. 33. Epperson commented that "This is an excellently produced and conceived adventure, and praise goes to Erick Wujick for a job well done. The only flaw is the fact that if the characters fail to complete their mission, they are dead. Some people will not appreciate that."
