= Mutants in Orbit =

- Front cover of Mutants in Orbit role-playing game sourcebook
- Author: James Wallis, Kevin Siembieda
- Illustrator: Michael Gustovich, Newton Ewell, Kevin Long, Kevin Siembieda
- Cover artist: Keith Parkinson
- Language: English
- Series: After the Bomb and Rifts RPGs
- Genre: Post-apocalyptic science fiction
- Publisher: Palladium Books
- Publication date: March 1992
- Publication place: United States
- Media type: Print (paperback)
- Pages: 112
- ISBN: 978-0-916211-48-6
- Preceded by: Mutants in Avalon
- Followed by: After the Bomb (2nd edition)

Mutants in Orbit is an adventure and sourcebook for the After the Bomb and Rifts role-playing games, authored by James Wallis and Kevin Siembieda. It was released by Palladium Books in March 1992. The book deals with life of space colonies. The setting is on the same time scale as the After the Bomb and Rifts, but from the space colonies' point of view.

== Publication history ==
At GenCon 22 in 1989, Erick Wujcik introduced James Wallis to Kevin Siembieda of Palladium Books, leading to Wallis becoming involved in the publication of role-playing game supplements through Mutants in Avalon (1990) and Mutants in Orbit (1992). Mutants in Orbit functioned as a sourcebook for both the Rifts and After the Bomb role-playing games.
