= Recon (role-playing game) =

Tabletop modern military role-playing game

The Roleplaying Game of the Viet Nam War
- First edition, artwork by Joe F. Martin
- Designers: Joe F. Martin
- Publishers: Role Playing Games, Inc.
- Years active: 1982–1984
- Genres: Modern military
- Players: 4–10
- Chance: Percentile dice (2d10)
- Skills: Strategy, Tactics
- Synonyms: Recon RPG

Recon (appearing later as RECON) is a military role-playing game where players assume the role of American soldiers during the Vietnam War. The first edition featured a wargame with role-playing elements, somewhat like Behind Enemy Lines and Twilight 2000, then gradually evolved into a full role-playing game.

== Description ==
Recon is a game set during American involvement in the Vietnam War, but can be moved to any modern war.

Character generation is relatively simple; each character only has three attributes (Strength, Agility, Alertness). The player chooses two military occupation specialties such as Demolitions or Heavy Weapons. These then determine secondary skills such as Forward Observer and Demolitions Disposal.

The rulebook includes weapons, recon teams, missions, recruiting and debriefing, and terrain generation.

The referee uses a Random Encounters table to generate terrain and villages, and to create groups of adversaries, obstacles to overcome, and problems to solve.

== Publication history ==
=== Original Recon ===
The first edition of Recon was written by Joe F. Martin and published by RPG, Inc. in 1982 as a 44-page book covering rules for a miniatures wargame.

Role-playing rules were included in the 44-page digest-sized second edition released in 1983 with a gamemaster's screen. This edition introduced the idea of easily created and disposable characters.

RPG, Inc. also released a number of supplements and adventures for the first and second editions:

- San Succi (1982) is a map pack that details a 16-block area in 1:72 scale for use with 20mm or 25mm lead figures. It also contains a guide to the 40 buildings on the map, a non-player character generating system, and a vehicular combat system called "Roadkill".
- The Haiphong H.A.L.O.: SOG Operations in North Vietnam (1983) was the first adventure campaign, and involved missions behind enemy lines in North Vietnam. Expanded rules include Army Special Forces, Navy SEALs, and Marine Force Recon commando characters, and detail real-world airborne, sea, and amphibious insertion techniques. Missions include reconnaissance, raiding, sabotage, assassination/ambush, prisoner snatching, and search and rescue.
- Hearts & Minds (1983) was the second adventure campaign, and involves a Special Forces A-team assigned to a cadre training mission in the Central Highlands of South Vietnam. The team must train and equip a local Montagnard unit to be able to defend its community from raids by Viet Cong Main Force troops. Includes a random tunnel generation system.
- Mission Director's Screen (1983) - a 3-panel gamemaster's screen.
- Sayaret & Track Commander (1983) provides a setting during Arab-Israeli Wars (1967 to 1983). Players could generate Israeli soldier characters that could operate as a commando detachment of the Sayaret or a tank crew with a Track Commander. It allowed the Mission Director to run Israeli commando raids or tank battles. The additional rules could also conceivably be used to simulate other contemporary conflicts involving urban warfare or armored combat from World War Two to the present (1980s).

A final adventure campaign featuring mercenaries, Headhunters, Ltd., was advertised but was not released before RPG, Inc. went out of business.

The Platoon 20 (P20 system) line of 20 mm (1:72 scale) metal miniatures were also produced by RPG, Inc. for use with the game.

=== The Revised RECON ===
After RPG, Inc. went out of business, Palladium Books acquired the intellectual property and released The Revised RECON, designed by Erick Wujcik, Kevin Siembieda, Matthew Balent, and Maryann Siembieda in 1986 as a 152-page book. The focus of the game was transformed from miniatures to a role-playing game. Thanks to its origins as a miniatures game, The Revised RECON is the only game from Palladium, aside from Valley of the Pharaohs (1983), that does not use the company's house Megaversal system. However, Palladium does provide conversion rules to bring play in line with the rest of their role-playing game series.

==== Advanced RECON ====
Advanced RECON was the only other book published for The Revised RECON, released February 1987. It is an expansion of the rules allowing the creation of Special Operations characters and detailing a four-mission campaign set in 1960s Laos. There are also sections on American and North Vietnamese tactics and strategy, period electronic equipment, a primer on the game world in 1965, and briefings on the Kingdom of Laos and other military and government agencies.

==== Deluxe Revised RECON ====
Palladium published Deluxe Revised RECON in April 1999. This integrated and reprints the content from both The Revised RECON and Advanced RECON into one book. It also introduces new rules, focusing more on the characters' lives after the wars.

== Reception ==
In Issue 21 of Abyss, J.R. Davies noted, "The mechanics are as good as any modern-period interpersonal system, but they are dismayingly poorly organized." Davies also questioned the skill system, calling it "at best perfunctory, and almost seems tacked on" and objected to the abundant derogatory slang and specialized slang. Davies concluded, "On the whole, this is a game to consider buying, but look it over first and weigh the obvious incompleteness and omissions against your need for a good but not outstanding modern combat system."

Anders Swenson reviewed Recon for Different Worlds magazine and stated that "I liked Recon and GMs who use the rules straight or as a hybrid system should have no difficulty in constructing a rough, tough campaign where Sergeant Rock and company knock the commies for a loss and score points for Our Side. The text is unabashedly chauvinist - some readers will inevitably find this irritating or unacceptable, but that, too, was part of the Vietnam era."

In Issue 70 of Space Gamer, Brian R. Train reviewed the original edition and commented "Recon is the game for the mercenary fan. It is a pleasure to play and a fine addition to the large inventory of roleplaying games." Train concluded with a positive recommendation, saying, "If you are at all interested in this historical period, Recon is well worth the money."

In the November 1983 edition of Analog Science Fiction, Dana Lombardy noted "Since its introduction, Recon has become the basis for gaming other modern military operations, including real and hypothetical coups and terrorist activities. All of this puts Recon in a controversial position. It deals with real situations — not a make-believe past of magic and monsters or a speculative future of space travel and aliens. There are just as many violent, treacherous, and other potentially negative situations in SF and fantasy RPG. But for some people Recon may be a little too close to reality."

In Issue 16 of Sorcerer's Apprentice, Michael Stackpole admitted, "I was rather shocked to see the game, and would have thought that the Viet Nam war was too close to be 'gamed' on an individual, roleplaying level. I was offended by a full page illustration of Vietnamese soldiers labeled 'Luke the Gook.' The rules are presented in a very open style, laced with Viet Nam slang that leads the reader to think everyone over there breezed through the war bringing away nothing but neat words and war stories." Stackpole also found fault with the rulebook, pointing out, "The rules are written with no consideration of those people who are not already playing other RPGs. They do not fully explain the purpose behind each section of the game, and the booklet is poorly organized." Stackpole concluded, "Recon causes me to wonder about the people who could treat the subject with such flippant handling. If any message is going to get across to these guys at RPG, Inc., the message will come from the marketplace. I urge you to avoid this game."
