= Headhunters, Ltd. =

Headhunters, Ltd. is a 1984 role-playing game supplement published by RPG Inc. for Recon.

== Contents ==
Headhunters, Ltd. is a supplement in which "Recon Variant #1" details an international mercenary force.

== Publication history ==
Headhunters, Ltd. was written by Joe F. Martin and published by RPG Inc. in 1984 as a booklet.
