= San Succi =

1982 military role-playing game supplement

- The packaging envelope and one of the pages of broadsheet-formatted rules
- Designers: Joe F. Martin
- Publishers: RPG Inc.
- Publication: 1982
- Genres: Military role-playing

San Succi is a supplement published by RPG Inc. in 1982 for the military role-playing game Recon.

== Contents ==
San Succi is a campaign setting for Recon. Although Recon is set in Vietnam during the Vietnam War, the setting of San Succi is the revolution‑torn capital city of a nameless Latin American country. The content, packaged as a 15" x 30" 28-page broadsheet newspaper, gives details of 16 city blocks including building descriptions. It also includes special rules for guard dogs, sentries, movement, terrain, car combat and rooftop surveillance.

== Publication history ==
Joe F. Martin designed the military role-playing game Recon, which was published by RPG Inc in 1982. RPG Inc. also released the Martin-designed supplement San Succi the same year, packaged as a 28-page broadsheet newspaper folded into a 9" x 12" envelope.

== Reception ==
In Issue 23 of Abyss (March 1983), Dave Nalle called this "an unusual and interesting new product." Nalle especially liked the "well-detailed maps", commenting that they were "clear and well done." Nalle found the most interesting aspect of San Succi was "its completeness. Not only are some 10 major areas of the city described in detail, but special rules and notes are included." Nalle also noted that the rules for vehicles were "real-world, abstract based guidelines rather than super-specific mechanics, and thus can be easily used with any game." Nalle did find some "small, picky and annoying" issues, specifically the formatting of the product. Although Nalle acknowledged the rulebook pages had to be large enough for the highly-detailed maps of the city, it was difficult to find rules when needed because firstly, the print was very small, and secondly, sometimes rules were printed on the reverse side of the map being used. Despite this, Nalle concluded, "On the whole, this is an unusually good role-playing aid, well-conceived and fully developed, and I would recommend it to players of modern-period RPGs."
