= Homeworld (Palladium) =

Role-playing game supplement

Homeworld is a 1982 role-playing game supplement for The Mechanoid Invasion published by Palladium Books.

== Contents ==
Homeworld is the final part of The Mechanoid Invasion trilogy, but was intended to be used a stand-alone game in which the characters that survived so far will journey to the Mechanoid homeworld.

== Reception ==
William A. Barton reviewed Homeworld in The Space Gamer No. 60. Barton commented that "Even with its flaws and lack of slick production, Homeworld is a useful addition to the Mechanoid Invasion - and much superior to the interim Journey."

Ken Rolston reviewed Homeworld for Different Worlds magazine and stated that "Alignment and insanity are not essential components in the Mechanoid system, as they are in D&D and Call Of Cthulhu, respectively, and their addition to the rules in Homeworld is of relatively little importance in increasing the value of the original concept of The Mechanoid Invasion."
