= The Mechanoid Invasion (1981) =

1981 role-playing game supplement

The Mechanoid Invasion is a 1981 role-playing game supplement published by Palladium Books for The Mechanoid Invasion.

== Contents ==
The Mechanoid Invasion is a supplement in which the basic situation of the setting is introduced, with character creation rules using a class-and-level system. Players can choose from various character professions for humans fighting against the Mechanoids, including commando, thief, Esper (psionic), vehicle engineer, and battle armor engineer. The book also outlines the history of the invasion, and covers details about vehicles, as well as information on the alien Mechanoid cyborgs.

== Publication history ==
The Mechanoid Invasion was written by Kevin Siembieda and published by Palladium Books in 1981 as a 48-page book.

The Mechanoid Invasion was Kevin Siembieda's first roleplaying book, published in 1981 with the help of a $1500 loan from Frances Loebs (mother of his friend William Messner-Loebs). The book tells "the story of an attack on a human colony by alien cyborgs" as noted by Shannon Appelcline, and "laid the groundwork for many of Palladium's products". It introduced "the Palladium house system, a D&D-derived RPG system", and featured themes of "machinery gone wrong" and "desperate danger for humanity". The "colorful settings and action-filled adventures" became trademarks of Palladium's future books.

== Reception ==
In Issue 42 of The Space Gamer No. 42, William A. Barton reviewed the original edition and commented, "If you can overlook its amateurish production (and the price helps in this), I think you'll find The Mechanoid Invasion worth the investment. It should provide some enjoyable role playing in an SF setting as a break from Traveller or your other favorite SF RPG."

Ken Rolston reviewed The Mechanoid Invasion for Different Worlds magazine and stated that "I liked this book; it would provide an excellent background for a good science fiction adventure campaign. The product quality is poor; the gamemaster will have to do most of the work of setting up the campaign, and the rules do not handle movement, healing, or other important aspects of a full-scale campaign; nonetheless, the gamemaster can improvise these aspects as they arise, much as was done with the original fantasy role-playing games. The concept of the Mechanoids and the tragic and desperate plight of the besieged colonies is the virtue of the game, and could be easily adapted to any science-fiction role-playing game."
