= The Palladium RPG Book 2: Old Ones =

Role-playing game supplement

Old Ones
- 1st printing (1984), cover art by Martin McKenna
- Designers: Kevin Siembieda
- Illustrators: Martin McKenna; Dave Carson; Scott Johnson; Michael Kucharski; Ramón Pérez; Kevin Siembieda; Maryann Siembieda
- Publishers: Palladium Books
- Publication: 1984
- Genres: Palladium Fantasy Role-Playing Game

Old Ones is a book written by Kevin Siembieda and published by Palladium Books in 1984 for the Palladium Fantasy Role-Playing Game. It outlines the kingdom of Timio, which is populated by hostile non-humans.

== Description ==
Old Ones is a source book that describes in detail the decadent kingdom of Timio. The first part of the book (six pages) gives a general overview of the kingdom, including its army, favored magic, judicial system, succession of rulers over eighteen centuries of history, encounter tables, and maps.

The majority of the book (114 pages) provide extensive details on 34 cities and 21 forts, including a detailed map of each and an annotated key for important buildings. Some notable non-player characters are mentioned as well.

The balance of the book contains:

- Two short adventures ("The Mystic Parcel" and "The Giant Firebrand and its Raiders")
- A short campaign synopsis titled "Ogre Invasions"
- A detailed description of a dungeon titled "The Hidden Temple"
- A detailed description of "The Forest of Enchantment" that hides two secret places: an underground complex of the Great Old Ones and "The Place of Magic"

The last two pages of the book describe a race of Alien Intelligences called the Great Old Ones, who were defeated and banished before humans gained sentience. Seven of the gods are described.

=== New material ===
Incorporated into the book are two new classes, Monks and Illusionists. New rules on travel and hunting are also included.

== Publication history ==
Palladium Books entered the fantasy role-playing game market in 1983 with Palladium Fantasy Role-Playing Game, and followed this immediately with several supplements, including Palladium RPG Book II: Old Ones, published in 1984. This 210-page perfect-bound softcover book was written by Kevin Siembieda, with cover art by Martin McKenna and interior art by Dave Carson, Scott Johnson, Michael Kucharski, Ramón Pérez, Kevin Siembieda, and Maryann Siembieda.

The first edition was reprinted in 1993 with new cover art by Kevin Siembieda. A second edition was published in 1996.

== Reception ==
In Issue 39 of Abyss, Jon Schuller liked the level of detail in the 1st edition of the book, noting "The background section of the book is pretty well done, with fairly detailed information ... useful maps and some very specific details for reference, making every setting potentially ready for play with little requirement from the gamemaster." However, Schuller found the whole thing unoriginal, writing, "The creatures are the traditional types found in AD&D and many other games. The adventure systems are predictable. The adventures have dungeon-type settings, and even the cities seem almost like dungeons." Schuller also pointed out that the Old Ones, the creatures for whom the book is titled, "are given less attention than they deserve and end up just being mega-monsters for the end of the adventure series." Schuller concluded that the book had good and bad aspects "and its value will depend on the needs of the individual gamer."

In Issue 11 of the British RPG magazine Arcane, Lucya Szachnowski reviewed the second edition, saying, "Old Ones is a must if you run the Palladium Fantasy RPG but don't own the first edition supplements, and it's versatile enough to use with other fantasy systems." However, Szachnowski pointed out "The main thing that lets the book down is its design. Although the illustrations are great, the maps are all rather bland. There is also no excuse for any second edition book having so many typos." Szachnowski concluded by giving the book a rating of 7 out of 10.

In the December 1997 edition of Dragon (Issue 242), Rick Swan called the second edition of Old Ones "a terrific sourcebook". He noted that "The level of detail is staggering; a typical city entry pinpoints more than 100 different locations (temples, granaries, tax offices) and provides dozens of adventure hooks. It’s a grim, vividly evoked world that feels alive; you can smell the sweat at the Gladiator School, taste the elderberry wine at Splash Tavern, feel a pickpocket's blade in your back at the Charm Emporium." He gave the book an above-average rating of 5 out of 6, with the comment "True, Old Ones owes a heavy debt to H. P. Lovecraft, but it’s still a dazzler."
