= The Palladium RPG Book V: "Further" Adventures in the Northern Wilderness =

The Palladium RPG Book V: "Further" Adventures in the Northern Wilderness is a 1990 role-playing game adventure published by Palladium Books for Palladium Fantasy Role-Playing Game.

== Plot summary ==
The Palladium RPG Book V: "Further" Adventures in the Northern Wilderness is an adventure in which four short adventure scenarios are presented, located in the Bruu-ga-Belimar mountains. It includes randomized encounter tables tailored to the region and offers a detailed description of a mountain village.

== Publication history ==
"Further" Adventures in the Northern Wilderness was written by Kevin Siembieda with a cover by Thomas Miller and published by Palladium Books in 1990 as a 48-page book.

== Reviews ==
- Shadis #4
- Games Review (Volume 2, Issue 9 - Jun 1990)
