= Sayaret & Track Commander =

Sayaret & Track Commander is a 1983 role-playing game supplement published by RPG Inc. for Recon.

== Contents ==
Sayaret & Track Commander is a supplement in which Sayaret provides detailed information on Israeli military units and organizational structure, along with encounters for the Middle East, while Tank Commander offers rules for playing crew members of tanks and armored personnel carriers.

== Publication history ==
Sayaret & Track Commander was written by Joe F. Martin and published by RPG Inc. in 1983 as a digest-sized 52-page book.
