= Road hogs (stock car racing) =

Road hogs, also known as Detroit Iron, is an amateur style of stock car racing, popular at race tracks in the Midwestern United States. Vehicles typical in this division include sedans and luxury cars of the 1970s, weighing between four and five thousand pounds. They are typically found in junkyards, with less than $1,000 being invested by the race teams. Road Hog racing can take place or either dirt or paved tracks.
