= Erick Wujcik =

American role-playing game designer

- Born: January 26, 1951; United States
- Died: June 7, 2008 (aged 57); San Rafael, California, United States
- Occupations: Author, editor, game designer, graphic artist, programmer
- Partner: Kathryn Kozora
- Writing career
- Period: 1979–2007
- Genres: Fantasy, science fiction
- Subjects: Computer programming, East Asian culture
- Notable works: After the Bomb; Amber Diceless RPG; Ninjas & Superspies; Revised RECON; Teenage Mutant Ninja Turtles & Other Strangeness
- Notable awards: ENnie Award; 2008 Lifetime Achievement; Origins Award; 2011 Hall of Fame

Erick A. Wujcik (January 26, 1951 – June 7, 2008) was an American designer of both pen-and-paper and computer role-playing games, and co-founder of Palladium Books.

== Gaming career ==
Wujcik started off as head of the gaming society at Wayne State University, The Warriors and Warlocks of the Wayne Weregamers Society, also known as the Wayne State Weregamers, where he met and befriended Kevin Siembieda. By 1980 the Wayne Weregamers became known as the Detroit Gaming Center, when Wujcik, the CDM (Caucus of Dungeon Masters) and Siembieda moved the group from the Monteith House, scheduled for demolition, to an off-campus building that was being maintained by a non-profit; Wujcik became Director for the Center with Siembieda as Assistant Director. Wujcik published the science-fiction adventure Sector 57 (1980) under the banner of the Detroit Gaming Center. Wujcik worked as a computer columnist for The Detroit News where he wrote their weekly "Computer Column" from 1979 to 1981. That served to be a springboard for him to co-found Palladium Books with Kevin Siembieda and to work on developing numerous role-playing games and supplements for such settings as Palladium Fantasy Role-Playing Game, Teenage Mutant Ninja Turtles & Other Strangeness, After the Bomb, Rifts, and many others, including Amber Diceless Roleplaying Game and Paranoia.

Siembieda obtained the rights to produce a licensed roleplaying game based on the Teenage Mutant Ninja Turtles comic book, but he did not approve of the freelancer's final product so he had Wujcik redesign the game, which was done in five weeks, and it was published as Teenage Mutant Ninja Turtles & Other Strangeness (1985). Wujcik designed Revised Recon (1987), a role-playing game revision of the miniatures warfare game Recon (1982). Wujcik also designed the Ninjas & Superspies role-playing game in 1988, which benefited from his long-term interest and extensive research on Japan. Wujcik also wrote the After the Bomb role-playing game for Palladium. He also did freelance work for West End Games, and wrote one of the early Clones in Space (1986) adventure for the Paranoia roleplaying game, and made contributions to the Acute Paranoia (1986) supplement for the game as well.

While working at West End Games, Wujcik learned that the company held a license from Roger Zelazny for his Amber novels, which were among the favorite novels of Wujcik, and he offered to design an Amber role-playing game even through West End would not guarantee to publish it. While playtesting the game, Wujcik found that it worked better without dice, but West End disagreed, so he acquired the role-playing game rights to Amber. He began developing the game for R. Talsorian Games in the early 1990s, but encountered creative differences there as well. Siembieda encouraged Wujcik to set up his own company to publish the game, and Wujcik founded Phage Press. Wujcik hired his cousins Lisa and Ron Seymour to run the business side of the company. Phage Press thus finally published Amber Diceless Roleplaying in November 1991. Wujcik did not like the manuscripts submitted for the Amber supplement Shadow Knight (1993), so he rewrote the book on his own. James Wallis brought his Bugtown game to Phage to be produced, but creative differences with Wujcik led Wallis to pull out of Phage in 1994 and start Hogshead Publishing. In 1996, Wujcik was able to convince Bugtown creator Matt Howarth to license the rights back to him, although Wujcik never actually published a game based on the comic. Wujcik wrote the book Mystic China (1995) for Palladium.

Wujcik was also the founder of the gaming convention known as Ambercon. In 1997 he went to work for Sierra Studios and was lead game designer on the game Return to Krondor (1998). He also served as a game designer at Outrage Entertainment for the game Alter Echo.

Wujcik served as chief editor of Amberzine, a fanzine for the Amber Diceless Roleplaying Game, publishing the work of such notables as Ray Bradbury, Henry Kuttner, and Roger Zelazny. He was also an editorial contractor for the Detroit Historical Museum, and gave seminars on a wide range of topics related to the writing, design and development of role-playing games.

Wujcik wrote the books Rifts China 1 and Rifts China 2. Wujcik licensed the Amber Diceless Role-playing rights to the company Guardians of Order in late 2004.

Beginning in the mid-1990s, Wujcik worked in the electronic game business, on titles from Sierra, THQ, and Ubisoft. From 2004 to 2006, Wujcik was Game Design Studio Manager for UbiSoft China, in Shanghai. Wujcik was also Adjunct Assistant Professor of Game Design at Hong Kong Polytechnic University between 2003 and 2008.

In early 2007, Wujcik became the senior game designer/writer for Totally Games. Until his death in June 2008, Wujcik was Senior Game Designer and Writer for Totally Games, located in Marin County, California.

== Illness and death ==
On December 22, 2007, it was announced that Wujcik had been diagnosed with pancreatic cancer. The same day, Kevin Siembieda set up a website for well-wishers to leave Wujcik messages:

Erick Wujcik, age 56, is dying of cancer. Until a few weeks ago, Erick was healthy and doing fine. He was enjoying his work at Totally Games, a videogame company, when he thought he had come down with the flu. When he couldn't shake it, he went to the doctors. The diagnosis was unexpected, to say the least. Pancreatic cancer that had spread to his liver. There was no advance warning. It was a shock. Erick presses forward with the willful exuberance he has exhibited all his life.

In his final months, chemotherapy treatments had failed to eradicate Wujcik's cancer and were halted. He entered hospice care in his home in San Rafael, California.

On June 6, 2008, Kevin Siembieda released an update on Erick's condition:

I'm sorry to report that Erick is quite ill now and suffering from the consequences of a failing liver. His deteriorating condition is not a surprise, but it is unwelcomed. Erick has beat the odds and fooled the doctors – fooled everyone – by lasting as long as he has, but then Erick has always been full of surprises and magic. But even the power of the "Wuj" has its limits, and I fear it won't be long now.

Erick Wujcik died the following day, June 7, 2008.

== Awards and honors ==
In August 2008, the first – and, to date, only – Lifetime Achievement ENnies were given out during the awards ceremony at Gen Con. Along with Dungeons & Dragons creators Dave Arneson and Gary Gygax, Erick Wujcik was recognized for his contributions to the gaming industry. However, being aware of his diagnosis and uncertain of his prognosis, EN World decided to present Wujcik with his award on January 26, 2008, at a gathering of family and friends to celebrate his 57th birthday. Kevin Siembieda later offered remarks in remembrance of Wujcik at the official ceremony.

Wujcik was also inducted into the Academy of Adventure Gaming Arts and Design Hall of Fame by the Game Manufacturers Association at the 37th Origins Awards on June 25, 2011.

At the beginning of the end credits for Tom Clancy's EndWar, there is a dedication to Wujcik.

== Bibliography ==
=== Palladium Books ===
==== After the Bomb ====
- Wujcik, E. & Balent, M. (January 1986). After the Bomb: A Teenage Mutant Ninja Turtles Supplement (1st ed.). Palladium Books. ISBN 978-0-916211-15-8. [Out of Print]
- Wujcik, E. & Siembieda, K. (October 1986). Road Hogs: A Supplement for Teenage Mutant Ninja Turtles & Other Strangeness. Palladium Books. ISBN 978-0-916211-20-2. [Out of Print]
- Wujcik, E. (June 1988). Mutants Down Under: A Sourcebook Compatible with Heroes Unlimited and Teenage Mutant Ninja Turtles. Palladium Books. ISBN 978-0-916211-34-9. [Out of Print]
- Wujcik, E. (July 1990). After the Bomb Book Four: Mutants of the Yucatan. Palladium Books, Incorporated. ISBN 978-0-916211-44-8. [Out of Print]
- Wujcik, E. (July 1990). Adventures in the Yucatan for the After the Bomb Series. Palladium Books, Incorporated. ISBN 978-0-916211-45-5. [Out of Print]
- Wujcik, E. & Siembieda, K. (December 2001). After the Bomb: A Complete Role-Playing Game (2nd ed.). Palladium Books. ISBN 978-0-916211-15-8. – Coauthor, maps.

==== Beyond the Supernatural ====
- McCall, R.; Siembieda, K. & Wujcik, E. (October 1987). Beyond the Supernatural: A Role-Playing Game of Contemporary Horror (1st ed.). Palladium Books, Incorporated. ISBN 978-0-916211-18-9. [Out of Print] – "Victim rules" and additional text.
- Siembieda, K.; Long, K.; Wujcik, E. & Garwood, B. (October 1990). Boxed Nightmares: An Adventure Sourcebook for Beyond the Supernatural. Palladium Books, Incorporated. ISBN 978-0-916211-41-7. [Out of Print] – Additional text and ideas.

==== Heroes Unlimited ====
- Long, K.; Siembieda, K.; Sheiring, S.; Marciniszyn, A.; Rosenstein, J.; Wujcik, E.; Gustovich, M. & Donald-Siembieda, A. (May 1992). Villains Unlimited: A Sourcebook for Heroes Unlimited (1st ed.). Palladium Books. ISBN 978-0-916211-49-3. [Out of Print] – Additional text.
- Siembieda, K.; Breaux, W. Jr.; Wujcik, E.; Long, K.; Oliver, A. & Trustrum, S. (March 1998). Heroes Unlimited, Revised Second Edition. Palladium Books. ISBN 978-1-57457-006-9. – Additional text and concepts.

==== Martial arts ====
- Wujcik, E. (May 1983). The Palladium Book of Weapons and Assassins. Palladium Books, Incorporated. ISBN 978-0-916211-03-5. – Research and compiling.
- Balent, M. (April 1989). The Compendium of Weapons, Armour & Castles. Palladium Books. ISBN 978-0-916211-38-7. [Out of Print] – Castle floor plans.
- Wujcik, E. (August 1990). Ninjas & Superspies (Rev. ed.). Palladium Books, Incorporated. ISBN 978-0-916211-31-8.
- Wujcik, E. & Siembieda, K. (February 1995). Mystic China. Palladium Books, Incorporated. ISBN 978-0-916211-77-6.

==== Mechanoid Invasion ====
- Siembieda, K. (April 1981). The Mechanoid Invasion. [Out of Print] – Tunnel designs.
- Siembieda, K. & Wujcik, E. (December 1985). The Mechanoids. Palladium Books. ISBN 978-0-916211-13-4. [Out of Print] – Adventure scenarios.

==== Palladium Fantasy Role-Playing Game ====
- Siembieda, K. & Wujcik, E. (June 1984). The Palladium Role-Playing Game (Rev. ed.). ISBN 978-0-916211-04-2. [Out of Print] – "Gersidi" adventure scenario.
- Siembieda, K. (November 1984). The Palladium Role-Playing Game Book II: Old Ones (1st ed.). ISBN 978-0-916211-09-7. [Out of Print] – "Special thanks" for help with "Place of Magic" adventure scenario and map designs.
- Siembieda, K.; Balent, M. & Wujcik, E. (July 1985). Monsters and Animals (1st ed.). ISBN 978-0-916211-12-7. [Out of Print] – Assistant monster designer.
- Siembieda, K.; Jacques, C.; Cartier, R.; McCall, R.; Marciniszyn, A. & Wujcik, E. (May 1987). The Palladium Role-Playing Game Book III: Adventures on the High Seas (1st ed.). ISBN 978-0-916211-17-2. [Out of Print] – Additional text.
- Bartold, T.; Boucher, G. S.; Davies, K.; Gomez, J.; Long, K.; Marciniszyn, A.; Siembieda, K. & Wujcik, E. (October 1989). The Palladium Role-Playing Game Book IV: Adventures in the Northern Wilderness. ISBN 978-0-916211-39-4. [Out of Print]
- Siembieda, K. & Wujcik, E. (December 1996). Dragons & Gods: A Sourcebook for the Palladium Fantasy Role-Playing Game, Second Edition. ISBN 978-0-916211-98-1.
- Siembieda, K.; Wujcik, E.; Cartier, R.; Marciniszyn, A.; Jacques, C. & McCall, R. (December 1996). Palladium Fantasy Role-Playing Game Book III: Adventures on the High Seas (2nd ed.). ISBN 978-0-916211-17-2. – Contributing author, editor.
- Wujcik, E.; Siembieda, K.; Coffin, B.; Bartold, T.; Marciniszyn, A.; Jacques, C. & Long, K. (February 2003). Wolfen Empire Adventure Sourcebook. ISBN 978-1-57457-063-2.

==== Revised RECON ====
- Wujcik, E.; Siembieda, K.; Balent, M. & Siembieda, M. (June 1986). The Revised RECON. ISBN 978-0-916211-19-6. [Out of Print] – Revised rules and additional text.
- Wujcik, E. (February 1987). Advanced RECON: Supplemental Rules and Adventures. ISBN 978-0-916211-24-0. [Out of Print] – Author, maps.
- Wujcik, E.; Siembieda, K.; Balent, M. & Siembieda, M. (April 1999). Deluxe Revised RECON. ISBN 978-1-57457-023-6. – Lead author, maps.

==== Rifts ====
- Siembieda, K.; Nowak, P. & Carella, C. J. (July 1995). Rifts World Book Eight: Japan. ISBN 978-0-916211-88-2. – Special consultant.
- Siembieda, K.; Coffin, B.; Breaux, W. Jr.; et al. (September 2001). Coffin, B. & Siembieda, K (eds.). Rifts Game Master Guide. ISBN 978-1-57457-067-0. – Selected material.
- Siembieda, K.; Coffin, B.; Wujcik, E.; et al. (February 2002). Rifts Adventure Guide. ISBN 978-1-57457-072-4. – Additional text and "words of wisdom".
- Siembieda, K.; Wujcik, E.; Smith, W.; Dudley, M. & Clark, B. C. (January 2004). Rifts World Book 24: China 1—The Yama Kings. ISBN 978-1-57457-094-6.
- Wujcik, E.; Siembieda, K.; Gleba, C. & Yoho, T. (August 2004). Rifts World Book 25: China 2—Heroes of the Celestial Court. ISBN 978-1-57457-095-3.
- Siembieda, K.; Bellaire, C.; Therrien, S.; Ward, T. & Wujcik, E. (August 2005). Rifts Role-Playing Game, Ultimate Edition. Palladium Books. ISBN 978-1-57457-150-9. – Additional text and ideas.

==== Robotech ====
- Frater, J.; Siembieda, K. & Wujcik, E. (July 1989). The Robotech Role-Playing Game Book Six: The Return of the Masters. Palladium Books. ISBN 978-0-916211-37-0. [Out of Print] – "Mecha Su-Dai" combat rules.

==== Teenage Mutant Ninja Turtles ====
- Wujcik, E. (September 1985). Eastman and Laird's Teenage Mutant Ninja Turtles & Other Strangeness. Palladium Books. ISBN 978-0-916211-14-1. [Out of Print]
- Wujcik, E. (June 1986). Teenage Mutant Ninja Turtles Adventures!. Palladium Books. ISBN 978-0-916211-16-5. [Out of Print]
- Wujcik, E. (May 1987). Eastman and Laird's Teenage Mutant Ninja Turtles Guide to the Universe. Palladium Books. ISBN 978-0-916211-25-7. [Out of Print]
- Wujcik, E. (April 1989). Transdimensional Teenage Mutant Ninja Turtles. Palladium Books. ISBN 978-0-916211-35-6. [Out of Print]

==== The Rifter ====
- Wujcik, E. (January 1998). Smith, W (ed.). "The Name Giver". The Rifter: Sourcebook and.
