= Palladium Fantasy RPG Book 3: Adventures on the High Seas =

Tabletop role-playing game supplement

Palladium Fantasy RPG Book 3: Adventures on the High Seas is a role-playing game supplement for Palladium Fantasy Role-Playing Game published by Palladium Books in 1987. An updated edition was published in 1996.

== Contents ==
Adventures on the High Seas is a supplement which presents new character options such as skills, character classes (including gladiator, pirate, acrobat, bard) and magic items, as well as new character sheets, types of sailing ships, and game rules useful for nautical adventures. The book also includes several adventures which take place on an island series that has been fully mapped-out.

== Publication history ==
Adventures on the High Seas was written by Kevin Siembieda, and was published by Palladium Books in 1987 as a 208-page book.

== Reception ==
In the November 1987 edition of Dragon (Issue 127), Ken Rolston reviewed the first edition of this book, and thought it was "Good old-fashioned, prehistoric D&D game-style fantasy adventures by the shipload." Rolston liked the extra rules and campaign supplements, calling the new character classes, magic items and curses "neat stuff." He concluded, "What it lacks in organization and sophistication, it more than makes up for in enthusiasm and imagination."

Lucya Szachnowski reviewed Adventures on the High Seas for Arcane magazine, rating it a 7 out of 10 overall, and stated that "the supplement is a useful reference for anyone wanting to run a sea-based campaign. It is packed with information and is good value for money. The main difference between this edition and the earlier one is a new cover, new interior art, some extra info and modifications to incorporate changes in the second edition Palladium Fantasy RPG rules."

In the December 1997 edition of Dragon (Issue 242), Rick Swan reviewed the second edition, and was complimentary, saying, "The seafaring stuff — the best of its kind I’ve ever seen — covers the economics of sea trade, ship-to-ship combat, and naval equipment." He gave the book an above-average rating of 5 out of 6, but concluded that it was "better for [gaming] veterans, owing to some complicated concepts."
