= Homeworld 81 =

Exhibition of new housing technologies

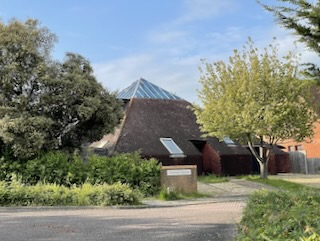
Pyramid House at Homeworld 81, Milton Keynes

Homeworld 81 was a housing exhibition held in Bradwell Common, Milton Keynes in May 1981, to demonstrate new trends and technologies in housing. It was organised by Milton Keynes Development Corporation and the 36 houses attracted 150,000 visitors. It was formally opened by the then Minister for Housing John Stanley MP.

The exhibition was open air and included a number of completed houses that were sold after the exhibition and are now part of a housing area in Bradwell Common, located immediately north of Central Milton Keynes. All the exhibits were sold after the event and are still visible from the street.

Homeworld 81 was the first housing exhibition in Milton Keynes, followed by Energy World in 1986 and FutureWorld in Kents Hill in 1994.

The 40th anniversary was celebrated in May 2021 with a series of lectures and visits in conjunction with the council and voluntary organisations.
