= The Journey (Palladium) =

Tabletop role-playing game supplement

The Journey is a 1982 role-playing game supplement for The Mechanoid Invasion published by Palladium Books.

== Contents ==
The Journey is a supplement which features new equipment, vehicles, powers, weapons, and creatures, intended for use by the human colonists on the planet Gideon as well as the invading Mechanoids.

== Reception ==
William A. Barton reviewed The Journey in The Space Gamer No. 59. Barton commented that "In short, just too many ideas and too many improbabilities are crammed into The Journey for it to really stand as a viable extension of its far-superior predecessor. Still if you did enjoy The Mechanoid Invasion and wish to add some of the new equipment, etc., to your continuing struggle on Gideon – or if a science fantasy quest through the pipelines of the mother ship actually appeals to you – then you might find The Journey worth your time to look into in spite of it all."

Ken Rolston reviewed The Journey for Different Worlds magazine and stated that "The final disappointment comes with the section on magic. The first page is illustrated by a guy with a staff, cape, and a headdress adorned with goat horns. I was not particularly happy with the psionics system; I am no fan of arbitrary and extensive spell lists, particularly in a science-fiction game, but there is ample precedent in the literature for psionic powers, though seldom in such profusion and lack of coherence. However, the bald introduction of D&D-style magic struck me as a final abdication from science-fictional credibility."
