= Acute Paranoia =

Tabletop role-playing game supplement

Cover art by Jim Holloway, 1986

Acute Paranoia, published in 1986 by West End Games, is the first supplement for the light-hearted science fiction role-playing game Paranoia.

== Contents ==
Acute Paranoia is an anthology of articles mainly for gamemasters designed to give them extra material to add to their Paranoia campaign. Material includes

- a series of psychological tests that will damage the sanity of the Troubleshooters
- using the Troubleshooters as laboratory mice
- new secret societies
- "Playing Robots", an article for the players on how to create and run robot characters
- ten adventure ideas
- "Me and My Shadow, Mark IV", a full-length adventure
- Four shorter adventures: "Botbusters", "Warriors of the Night Cycle", and "The Harder They Clone"

== Publication history ==
The light-hearted role-playing game Paranoia was first published by West End Games (WEG) in 1984. Acute Paranoia, published by WEG in 1986, was the first supplement for the role-playing game, an 80-page softcover anthology edited by Greg Costikyan and Ken Rolston, with contributions by Erick Wujcik, Steve Maurer, Steve Crane, Mike Dawson, Steve Gilbert, Peter Corless, Dennis Sustare, Kevin Wilkins, Allen Varney, Warren Spector, John M. Ford, Scott Palter, Curtis Smith, and Doug Kaufman. Interior art was by Jim Holloway and Russ Steffens, and Holloway also provided the cover art.

In the 2014 book Designers & Dragons: The 90s, game historian Shannon Appelcline noted that Erick Wujcik freelanced for WEG, commenting that "Working with them, Wujcik wrote one of Paranoia's earliest adventures, Clones in Space (1986), and also contributed to the Acute Paranoia (1986) supplement."

== Reception ==
In the July 1986 edition of White Dwarf (Issue #79), Marcus L. Rowland called it "all splendidly silly." However, while Rowland liked most parts of the book, "at least two of the mini-modules were disappointing, and [the short scenario] 'The Harder They Clone' seems to recycle ideas from earlier modules." He concluded by giving it a qualified recommendation, saying, "Although this supplement isn't perfect, a total of eight or nine disappointing pages out of eighty isn't a bad score, and most Paranoia referees should find this a worthwhile investment."

== Other recognition ==
A copy of Acute Paranoia is held in the collection of the Strong National Museum of Play (object 117.821).

== Other reviews ==
- The V.I.P. of Gaming Issue 4 (July/August 1986, p.24)
- Windgeflüster Issue 27 (October 1994, p.44, in German)
- Casus Belli Issue 33 (June 1986, p. 24), and Issue 38 (June 1987, p. 20), both in French
- Jeux et Stratégie #45
