= Palladium Fantasy Role-Playing Game =

Tabletop fantasy role-playing game

- Front cover of Palladium Fantasy; Role-Playing Game, Second Edition core rulebook, illustrated by Martin McKenna
- Designers: Kevin Siembieda, Matthew Balent, Thomas Bartold, Bill Coffin, Steve Edwards, Mark Hall, Patrick Nowak, Erick Wujcik, et al.
- Publishers: Palladium Books
- Publication: July 1983 (1st edition); June 1984 (1st ed., revised); April 1996 (2nd edition)
- Years active: 1983–present
- Genres: Fantasy
- Languages: English
- Systems: Megaversal
- Website: palladiumbooks.com

The Palladium Fantasy Role-Playing Game is a fantasy role-playing game published by Palladium Books in 1983.

== Description ==
This game is set in the "Palladium world" 10,000 years after a great war between the elves and dwarves. Some critics noted that this game, created only a few years after Advanced Dungeons & Dragons (AD&D), has many similarities.

=== Character generation ===
Similar to AD&D, players can choose from one of several races for their player character, including human, elf, gnome, and dwarf. Unlike AD&D, there are several other races players can also choose including troglodyte, kobold, goblin, orc, changeling, troll, and wolfen (a hybrid human/wolf race).

Players then can choose from character classes that are roughly analogous to those in AD&D: Warrior, wizard, cleric, thief, etc. Similarly, alignment, hit points and experience points all work in much the same way as in AD&D.

Character classes determine which skills are available to the character, and grant access to abilities like spellcasting. Characters can leave one class to pursue another.

=== Magic and psionics ===
There are several different kinds of magic as well as psychic powers. Magic is powered by Potential Psychic Energy (P.P.E.), while psychic powers are fueled by Inner Strength Points (I.S.P.).

=== History, geography and politics ===
The book delves into the long history of the Palladium world, which is divided into several ages.

The game is set on a single continent and several nearby islands. The climate varies from tropical in the south to subarctic in the north.

The continent and islands are divided into several nations. In addition, there are racial alliances and hostilities — for example, although humans are allied to both elves and dwarves, those two races are still hostile to each other because of a war between them that ended ten thousand years ago.

Cover of The Palladium Role-Playing Game, Revised Edition core rulebook, published June 1984, illustrated by Kevin Siembieda

Cover of The Palladium Role-Playing Game, Revised Edition (7th printing) core rulebook, published March 1990, illustrated by Kevin Long.

== Publication history ==
With the success in the late 1970s of the fantasy role-playing games Advanced Dungeons & Dragons (TSR, 1977) and Runequest (Chaosium, 1977), several companies published similar games in the hopes of enjoying the same success. Palladium Books decided to enter the market in 1983 with Palladium Role-Playing Game, a 274-page book designed by Kevin Siembieda and Erick Wujcik, with illustrations by Sembieda and Michael Kucharski. This edition underwent several minor revisions with various changes in cover art over the next ten years. In addition, Palladium published several sourcebooks with more information about the settings.

In 1996, Palladium introduced an expanded second edition retitled Palladium Fantasy Role-Playing Game, a 336-page book created by Siembieda, with cover art by Martin McKenna and interior art by McKenna, Siembieda, Flint Henry, Scott Johnson, Michael Kucharski, Vince Martin, and Randall K. Post.

== Reception ==
In Issue 27 of Abyss, Eric Olson thought that this resembled many older Judges Guild products, both in quality and content, and pointed out "Judges Guild products may have been good enough for the market of 4 or 5 years ago, [but] it is definitely behind the needs of today and of little value. Palladium has produced a system which is a mass of dragons and magic, the heart's desire of many younger players of days gone by; but that is not what's needed today." Olson concluded, "If you have enough of the same old things we have been seeing over and over the past few years, save your money.""

In the May 1984 edition of Dragon (Issue 85), Ken Rolston thought this RPG compared very favorably to the industry giant, AD&D. His only caveat was that for the relatively high price — $20 — it should have included a box, dice and other player materials. However, he admired the "Attractive combat and skill systems. First-class magical character classes — complete with magical circles, mystic symbols, and elemental magics — offer simple but comprehensive fantasy magic. Nice treatment of alignments and deities. Contains an outline of a campaign world and a brief but imaginative introductory scenario." However, he concluded that since it was only a book, "At a price of $20 for a paperback, only a fair value."

In the May-June 1985 edition of Space Gamer (Issue No. 74), Jerry Epperson was more ambivalent, saying "The Palladium Role-Playing Game is a game that aspired to greatness but fell just a little short of the mark. With the advent of RuneQuest, The Fantasy Trip, and Lands of Adventure, Palladium is just a little out of step. GMs who are looking to add spice to their D&D games, or who really don't demand a great deal of realism from game mechanics, should by all means pick up Palladium. But if you're searching for the ultimate in 'realism' and innovative design . . . keep looking."

In his 1990 book The Complete Guide to Role-Playing Games, game critic Rick Swan thought that this game was too similar to AD&D, noting that there were "no new systems, no new approaches, no new insights. The character classes ... aren't dramatically different from AD&D, nor are basic concepts such as alignment, experience points and saving throws." Swan allowed that the combat system was original but found it too complex. However, Swan found some of the game elements such as the magic system, religion, and fairy lore "informative and fun to read.", and thought they could be easily transferred to other fantasy RPGs. Swan concluded by giving the game a rating of 2.5 out of 4, saying, "I can't imagine many players preferring this to AD&D, RuneQuest or any other of the established fantasy games."

In Issue 127 of Dragon, Ken Rolston reviewed the regional adventure guide Adventures on the High Seas, published in 1987, and found much to his liking: "The Palladium fantasy campaign world is full of magic and monsters, just like FRP campaigns should be, and this pack contains a little bit of everything, from orcs and lost temples to pirates and crazed cult assassins... What it lacks in organization and sophistication it more than makes up for in enthusiasm and imagination." Ten years later, in the December 1997 edition of Dragon (Issue 242), Rick Swan reviewed the second edition of Adventures on the High Seas, published in 1996, and called it "another winner." He rated the book 5 out of 6, saying, "The seafaring stuff [is] the best of its kind I’ve ever seen."

In Issue 8 of the British games magazine Arcane, Andy Butcher reviewed the 2nd edition of the game, and commented, "if you haven't got any of the other [Palladium] games and your campaign is based firmly in the Palladium World, then there's a great deal of useful stuff here." Butcher concluded by giving the game an average rating of 7 out of 10 overall. Butcher comments that

Later that year, in a reader poll conducted by Arcane to determine the 50 most popular roleplaying games of all time, The Palladium Fantasy RPG was ranked 26th. Editor Paul Pettengale commented: "Well, the rules are almost identical to those in Palladium's Rifts roleplaying system, and as such it's well suited to existing players of that game, who will have little to learn. Even newcomers should have little difficulty with The Palladium Fantasy RPG, though. The rules lie somewhere between AD&D and Rolemaster in complexity, and combine character classes with a simple skills system. A good alternative to the better known Fantasy RPGs."

== Reviews ==
- Australian Realms #30

== Publications ==
=== First edition ===
==== Core rule book ====
- The Palladium Role-Playing Game (First edition: July 1983; Revised edition: June 1984) [out of print]

==== Regional adventure guides ====
- The Arms of Nargash-Tor (March 1984) [out of print]
- Book II: Old Ones (November 1984) [out of print]
- Book III: Adventures on the High Seas (May 1987) [out of print]
- Book IV: Adventures in the Northern Wilderness (October 1989) [out of print]
- Book V: "Further" Adventures in the Northern Wilderness (April 1990) [out of print]
- Book VI: Island at the Edge of the World (September 1993)
- Book VII: Yin-Sloth Jungles (October 1994)

==== Supplemental sourcebooks & other support material ====
- The Palladium Role-Playing Game Shield (copyright date 1984) [out of print]
- Monsters & Animals (First edition: July 1985; Revised edition: October 1988) [out of print]

=== Second edition ===
==== Core rule book ====
- Palladium Fantasy Role-Playing Game, Second Edition (April 1996)

==== Regional adventure guides ====
- Book II: Old Ones, Second Edition (June 1996)
- Book 3: Adventures on the High Seas, Second Edition (December 1996)
- Book 8: The Western Empire (September 1998)
- Book 9: The Baalgor Wastelands (March 1999)
- Book 10: Mount Nimro—Kingdom of Giants (May 1999)
- Book 11: Eastern Territory (April 2001)
- Book 12: Library of Bletherad (July 2000)
- Book 13: Northern Hinterlands (June 2001)
- Land of the Damned One: Chaos Lands (December 2001)
- Land of the Damned Two: Eternal Torment (June 2002)
- Wolfen Empire (February 2003) Reprints material from first edition Book IV and Book V.
- Bizantium and the Northern Islands(2015)
- Garden of the Gods(2020)
- Book 7: Yin-Sloth Jungles, 2nd Edition(2024)

==== Supplemental sourcebooks ====
- Monsters & Animals (August 1996)
- Dragons & Gods (December 1996)
- Mysteries of Magic—Book One: The Heart of Magic (September 2009)
