= The Mechanoid Invasion =

1981 science fiction role-playing game

- Front cover of The Mechanoid Invasion core rulebook, illustrated by Kevin Siembieda
- Designers: Kevin Siembieda
- Illustrators: Kevin Siembieda, Michael Gustovich, William Messner-Loebs, James A. Osten
- Publishers: Palladium Books
- Publication: April 1981
- Years active: 1981–1988
- Genres: Science fiction
- Languages: English
- Website: palladiumbooks.com

The Mechanoid Invasion (and its source books, supplements and sequels) was the first role-playing game from Palladium Books, published in 1981. The science fiction setting places human settlers at odds with a deadly cybernetic invasion force.

== Description ==
The Mechanoid Invasion centers on the planet Gideon E, colonized by humans. A powerful, malevolent, and numerous race of bio-driven machines have come to invade the planet. The humans are hard-pressed to defend themselves against the technologically superior invaders.

The game uses a stripped down version of the Palladium Role-Playing Game rules. Characters have basic attributes (Physical Strength, Intelligence Quotient, Speed, etc.). Hit points are dependent on the character's Physical Endurance. The characters are completed with Occupational Character Classes and their accompanying skills. There are also rules for paranormal psionic abilities.

== Publication history ==
In 1981, Palladium published its first role-playing game as a series of three comic-book sized sourcebooks:

1. The Mechanoid Invasion covers the invasion of Gideon E
2. Journey, describes human survivors living within a mechanoid mothership after the destruction of the Gideon E colony and introduces "minor magic and some psionics".
3. Homeworld deals with the Mechanoid homeworld itself.

In 1985, Palladium revised and republished the game as a single book, The Mechanoids.

In 1991 Caliber Comics produced a 3-book series called The Mechanoids which adapted the game into comic book stories.

In the early 90s "Sourcebook Two" of Rifts was released, titled The Mechanoids, and it included conversions for the Mechanoids for use in a Rifts Earth setting, along with a storyline on how they got there.

In 1998 a collected Mechanoids RPG was released, compiled as the Mechanoid Invasion Trilogy which is still available.

== Reception ==
In his 1990 book The Complete Guide to Role-Playing Games, game critic Rick Swan was impressed with this game, writing "Concise rules, a slick presentation, and a fascinating setting add up to a gem of a game." The only issue Swan had was with the paranormal abilities, which Swan thought "reads suspiciously like magic spells ... This psionic/magic system contrasts too sharply with the high-tech setting of Mechanoids and should've been left on the drawing board." Swan's favorite part of the game was the "vivid setting" that had humans hopelessly outclassed by the Mechanoids. As Swan summarized it, "The situation is desperate, and the result is a level of tension seldom achieved in a role-playing game." Swan concluded by giving the game a solid rating of 3 out of 4, saying, "science fiction fans shouldn't miss Mechanoids."
