= Energy World =

Exhibition of low-energy housing

Coordinates: 52°01′06″N 0°46′18″W

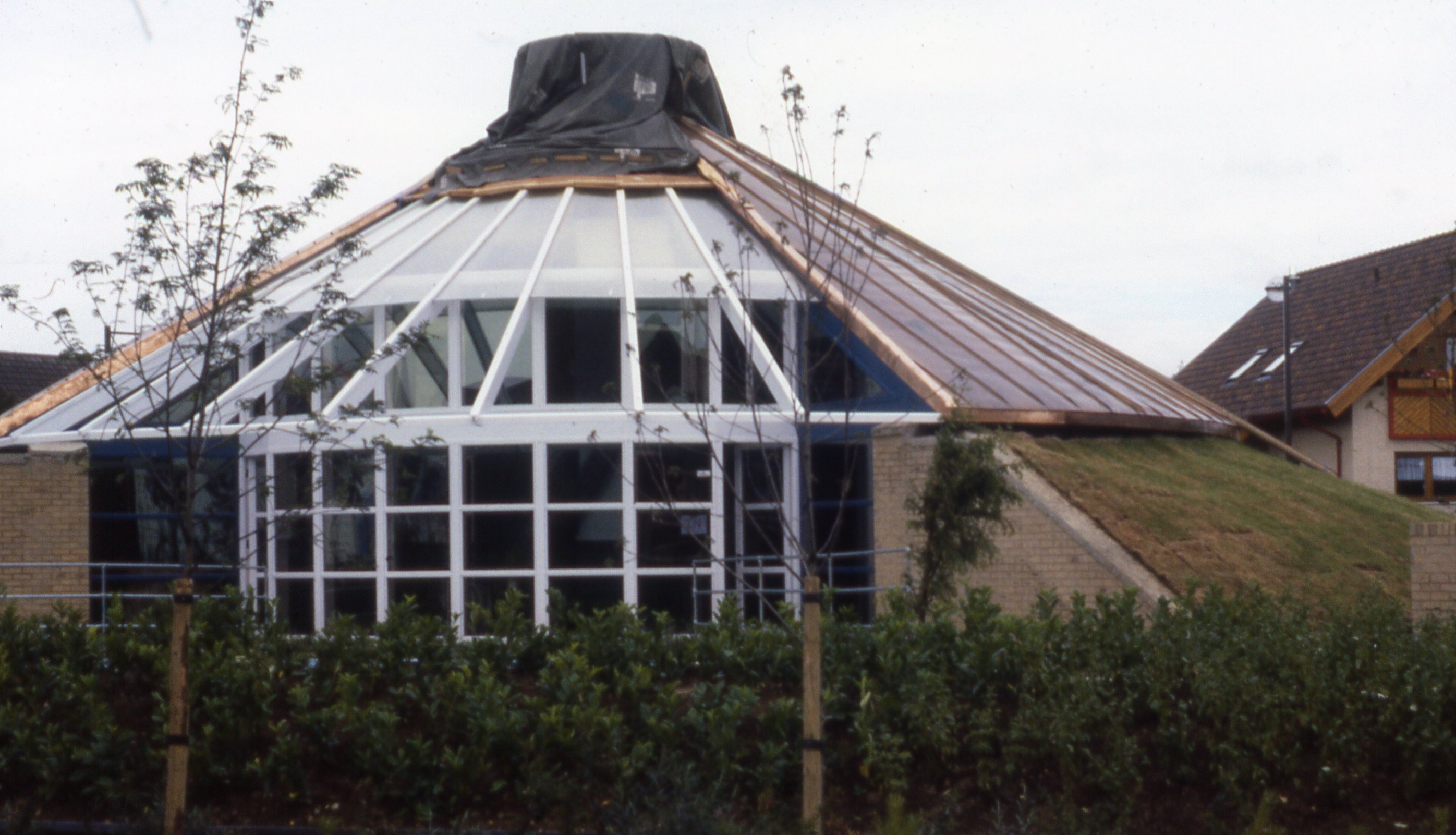

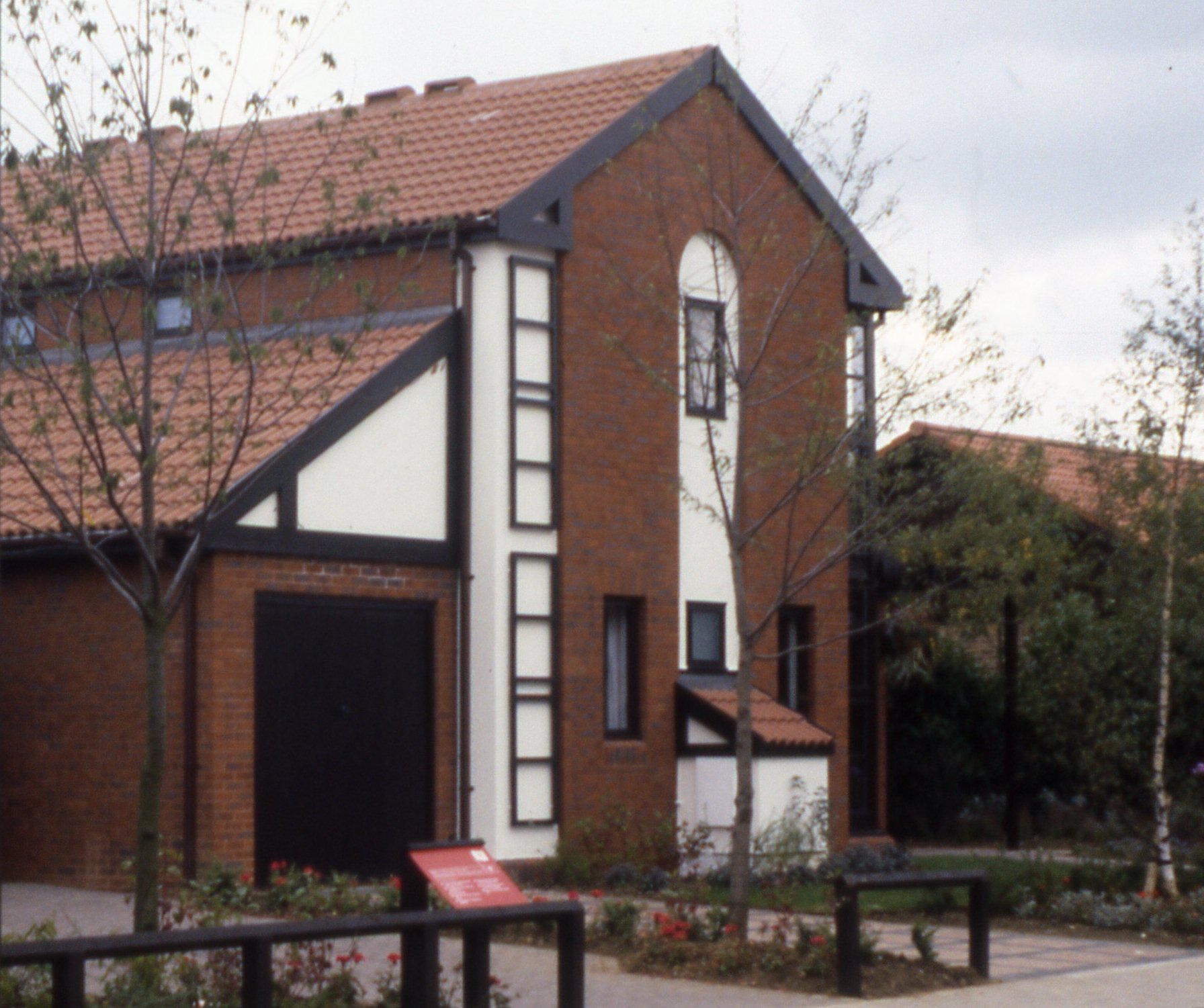

Energy World was a demonstration project of 51 low-energy houses constructed in the Shenley Lodge area of Milton Keynes, United Kingdom. The project was promoted by the Milton Keynes Development Corporation and culminated in a public exhibition in August and October 1986 that attracted international interest. It was a significant landmark in the design and construction of low-energy housing, and in the development of energy efficiency evaluation tools. It has had a long-term impact on Government policy and within the national house-building industry, insofar as the progressive 'tightening up' of the energy section of the Building Regulations has largely been founded on this pioneering work.

The houses were designed to be at least 30% more efficient than the Building Regulations then in force. The architecture and technologies used was very varied, and included designs from Canada (the first R-2000 house in the UK), Denmark, Finland, Germany, and Sweden. Although it was later removed, the exhibition also featured a wind turbine, then an uncommon sight.

The United Kingdom House of Commons commissioned an environmental study of housing sustainability in the 2004–2005 session. One expert witness testified that Milton Keynes housing was continuing to sell for 3% above the price of other housing in the area, while responding to a committee member's question whether environmentally-friendly houses were marketable.

Energy World was one of several low-energy projects built in the Milton Keynes area. These included trials on a number of individual houses and the construction of 177 houses in the 1970s Pennyland project. Following the success of Energy World, 1,200 dwellings were built to the same (or better) energy standard in the rest of Shenley Lodge (known as 'the Energy Park'), and the same standard was subsequently applied Citywide. The concept of the Energy Park was extended into non-residential buildings built across Watling Street in Knowlhill where a number of low energy office buildings have been constructed including the two phases of the headquarters buildings of the National Energy Foundation.

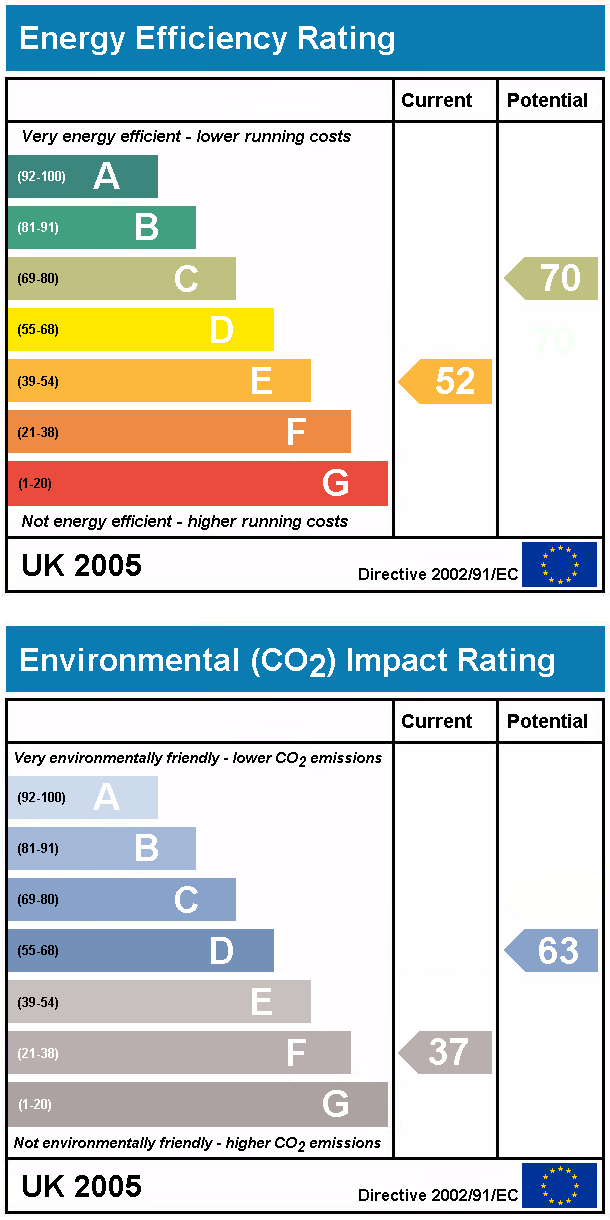
Home energy performance rating charts

== Home energy efficiency rating schemes ==
Another area where Energy World continues to have an impact derives from the Milton Keynes Energy Cost Index (MKECI) , which was used to calculate the energy efficiency of the Energy World houses. Based on the results and feedback from Energy World, this was to evolve into the UK's first national energy efficiency rating scheme for buildings, with the launch in 1990 of the National Home Energy Rating scheme (NHER) . This, in turn, gave rise to the introduction in 1995 of the Standard Assessment Procedure (SAP) rating system used in the national Building Regulations and in home Energy Performance Certificates (originally introduced in 2007 as part of the Home Information Pack).

== See also ==
- Homeworld 81
- Energy efficiency in British housing
- BedZED Zero energy housing development
- Category:Low-energy building
- World energy resources and consumption
- Zero-energy building
