= Dragons & Gods =

1996 role-playing game

Dragons & Gods is a 1996 role-playing game supplement for Palladium Fantasy published by Palladium Books.

== Plot summary ==
Dragons & Gods is a book which describes the creatures of the Palladium Fantasy world, including the dragons, elementals, demons and devils.

== Reception ==
Andy Butcher reviewed Dragons & Gods for Arcane magazine #18 (April 1997), comments that "this is another solid sourcebook from Palladium, and is thankfully well up to the company's usual high standard."

Rick Swan reviewed Dragons & Gods for Dragon #242 (December 1997), rating it a 5 out of 6, calling it "dazzling" and "a visionary treatise on fantasy’s most powerful entities" and comments that "Dragons & Gods is roleplaying nirvana."
