= Hearts & Minds (Recon) =

1983 Modern military role-playing sourcebook

- Designers: Joe F. Martin
- Publishers: RPG Inc.
- Publication: 1983
- Genres: Vietnam War

Hearts & Minds, subtitled "Recon Module 2", is an adventure published by RPG Inc. in 1983 for the Vietnam War role-playing game Recon.

== Background ==
During the Vietnam War, American and South Vietnamese forces employed what was called the "Hearts and Minds" strategy of using military, political, economic, and social means to attempt to establish or reestablish South Vietnamese government control over rural areas and people under the influence of the Viet Cong.

== Description ==
Hearts & Minds is a Recon scenario in which the players role-play an American Special Forces team that is dropped into Montagnard territory near the Vietnam/Laos/Cambodia border with orders to gain the support and aid of the local population. The adventure also includes tables for encounters along the Ho Chi Min Trail.

== Publication history ==
Joe F. Martin designed a set of combat rules titled Recon, which was published by RPG, Inc in 1982. The following year, Martin added role-playing rules and a gamemaster's screen; the result was published as the second edition of Recon, a role-playing game set in the Vietnam War. Martin also designed several adventures and sourcebooks, including Hearts & Minds, published in 1983 as a 44-page digest-sized book.

== Reception ==
In Issue 30 of Abyss, Dave Nalle wrote "While the topic and background are a bit sensitive, even today, the attitude towards the natives and the role of the characters is both realistic and sympathetic, and the emphasis (hard though it may be to believe) is on interaction and attitude rather than combat and conflict." Nalle concluded, "The production is a bit rough, but all the information is there for several interesting sessions. Hearts & Minds may not be for everyone, but it is a nice, well-developed scenario and a fairly good buy at $3.50."

In Issue 70 of Space Gamer, Brian Train commented "Not every roleplaying game need be a swords 'n' sorcery rumpus or a space opera ... If you are at all interested in this historical period, it is well worth the money."
