= The Mechanoids =

Tabletop science fiction role-playing game

Cover art by Kevin Siembieda, 1985

The Mechanoids is a science fiction role-playing game published by Palladium Books in 1985 that is based on the earlier role-playing game The Mechanoid Invasion.

== Description ==
The Mechanoids is set one month after the events described in the original The Mechanoid Invasion, an alien invasion by a race known as the Mechanoids, who are bent on destroying humanity. The players must try to find out more about the plans of the Mechanoids, and search for ancient weapons buried deep in the Earth that can help them.

The book includes character generation, a timeline of the alien invasion that forms the focus of the game, notable people, weapons, information about the Mechanoid aliens, and ancient weapons. The book also includes five adventures:

- "Little Mechanoid Lost"
- "Run to Ramtau"
- "The Rescue of Doctor Druall"
- "Survival"
- "The Ocean's Outrage"

== Publication history ==
Palladium Books published The Mechanoid Invasion, their first role-playing game, in 1981, followed by sequels The Journey and Homeworld. In 1984, Palladium undertook a major revision of its role-playing rules, and the following year, Palladium published The Mechanoids, which incorporated the new rules as well as a continuation of the original storyline. The result was a 168-page softcover book written by Kevin Siembieda, with artwork by Siembieda and Michael Gustovich.

In the 2014 book Designers & Dragons: The '80s, game historian Shannon Appelcline explained that after Palladium expanded their role-playing system in 1984, "The next year The Mechanoids (1985) returned, with a new book that again advanced the storyline. With three different games under its belt Palladium was by now — alongside Chaosium and Hero — a leader in producing multi-genre house systems. However, Palladium's RPGs to date were less successful than the company’s books of weapons and armor."

== Reception ==
In the August 1986 edition of White Dwarf (Issue #80), Marcus L. Rowland felt that the additions of ancient weapon technology "unfortunately [...] have taken away some of the atmosphere of the original game; in the first book it was obvious that the humans stood no chance of winning, but in this new release there seems to be some hope." Rowland also felt that the game was fundamentally flawed as a role-playing game: "There isn't much for players to do, apart from fighting the Mechanoids, so scenarios tend to be somewhat simplistic and repetitive." Rather than a role-playing game, Rowland suggested that "this system would work better as a tactical/strategy war game." He concluded with a thumbs down, saying, "I didn't like this game much, since I tend to prefer roleplaying to combat systems, but more violent GMs and players may find it has something to offer."

In his 1990 book The Complete Guide to Role-Playing Games, game critic Rick Swan was impressed with this game, writing "Concise rules, a slick presentation, and a fascinating setting add up to a gem of a game." The only issue Swan had was with the paranormal abilities, which Swan thought "reads suspiciously like magic spells ... This psionic/magic system contrasts too sharply with the high-tech setting of Mechanoids and should've been left on the drawing board." Swan's favorite part of the game was the "vivid setting" that had humans hopelessly outclassed by the Mechanoids. As Swan summarized it, "The situation is desperate, and the result is a level of tension seldom achieved in a role-playing game." Swan concluded by giving the game a solid rating of 3 out of 4, saying, "science fiction fans shouldn't miss Mechanoids."
