= GamesMaster International =

Game magazine in UK

- GMI № 12, July 1991
- Editor: Oliver Frey
- Frequency: Monthly
- Publisher: Newsfield Publications
- First issue: July 1990
- Final issue Number: October 1991; 15
- Country: United Kingdom

GamesMaster International (GMI) was a roleplaying game magazine in the UK published by Newsfield Publications starting in July 1990. It was subtitled the Independent Fantasy Gaming Monthly. The magazine featured the same editorial team as G.M. The Independent Fantasy Roleplaying Magazine. The team approached Newsfield in 1990 to take over the publication after Croftward Publishing ceased trading. Newsfield added the word International to the title.

With the knowledge of its former circulation and advertisement income history, Newsfield decided to launch the magazine on a low budget, and the first issue hit newsstands in July 1990. However, the gaming market was in deep recession and both circulation and advertisement income targets were never achieved. The magazine ceased trading after fifteen issues in October 1991 when Newsfield went into liquidation.
