= Megaversal system =

Tabletop role-playing game

The Megaversal system, sometimes known as the Palladium system, is a role-playing game system used in most of the role-playing games published by Palladium Books. It uses dice for roll-under percentile skill checks, roll-high combat checks and saving throws, and determination of damage sustained in melee encounters by which a character's hit points, Structural Damage Capacity (S.D.C.), or Mega-Damage Capacity (M.D.C.) is reduced accordingly.

== Conception ==
Shannon Appelcline, in his book Designers & Dragons, states that the Megaversal system was an overhaul of the game system that Palladium had originally derived from Advanced Dungeons & Dragons: "It was one part highly traditional – with its character classes, experience points and levels – and one part arcane – with its abbreviations like OCCs, RCCs, PCCs, PPE, SDC and MDC."
