= T. S. Luikart =

American writer and game designer

Todd Steven Luikart
- Born: 1971 (age 54–55); San Diego, California
- Other name: T. S. Luikart
- Occupations: Writer, tabletop role-playing game designer

Todd Steven Luikart, known as T. S. Luikart (born 1971) is an American tabletop role-playing game designer.

== Early life ==
T. S. Luikart was born in San Diego, California in 1971. He attended the University of California, Santa Cruz, graduating with a Bachelor of Arts in Literature in 1994.

== Career ==
Luikart was a game designer for Green Ronin Publishing, working on Mutants & Masterminds, The Red Star Campaign Setting, and Skull & Bones. He also developed the Dragon Age, including Dragon Age: Dark Role Playing Game Set 1 and Dragon Age: Blood in Ferelden.

He previously worked for Black Industries, where he developed Warhammer games such as Warhammer Fantasy Roleplay 2nd Edition, Dark Heresy. In 2015, he joined the creative team of Cubicle 7. There, he worked on The One Ring Roleplaying Game, Adventures of Middle-earth, the Age of Sigmar, and Warhammer Fantasy Roleplay 4th edition.

He has included several short stories in his RPG work, as well as publishing some short work online. He has additionally done some writing on the theory of roleplaying in Daedalus.

== Honors ==
Luikart was selected as an Industry Insider Guest of Honor for Gen Con in 2012 alongside Gareth-Michael Skarka.

== Personal life ==
Luikart is married and has children.

== Selected works ==
Year	Game	Titles/campaigns	Notes
	The One Ring Roleplaying Game	Multiple campaigns incl. Ruins of the North	
	Adventures in Middle-Earth		
	The Red Star Campaign Setting		
	Skull & Bones		
	Mutants & Masterminds		
	Nocturnals		
	Dragon Age		
	Warhammer Fantasy Roleplay	2nd and 4th edition cores, incl. Realms of Sorcery, Old World Bestiary, Terror in Talabheim, The Horned Rat, The Imperial Zoo	
	Warhammer Age of Sigmar		
	Soulbound		
	Warhammer 40,000 Roleplay: Wrath & Glory		
	Underworld		
	Imperium Maledictum	Imperium Maledictum Core, Imperium Maledictum Starter Set	
