= Chris Birch (game designer) =

British tabletop role-playing game designer

- Occupation: Game designer

Chris Birch is a game designer who has worked primarily on role-playing games (RPGs).

== Early life ==
When Birch was 8, one of his brothers introduced him to Dungeons & Dragons. He then moved on to Ogre and other board wargames as well as Napoleonic wargames.

Without many friends who shared his passions, Birch started to design solo rules for his various games.

Birch worked in London in the music business. He is married to Rita.

== Career ==
As a young adult, Birch had read the British comic series Starblazer: Science Adventure in Picture (1979–1991). In August 2006, Birch discovered that the Starblazer series had an RPG playing game license available. Years earlier, Birch had discussed a board game design with Angus Abranson of Cubicle 7, so he reached out to Abranson about creating a Starblazer RPG. Abranson was interested and encouraged Birch to create his first professional game, Starblazer Adventures with friend Stuart Newman. Birch and Newman decided to use the Fate game system rather than try to invent a new game engine. Cubicle 7 published the result in 2008.

Two years later, Birch worked with Sarah Newton to design Legends of Anglerre (2010), an RPG based on fantasy stories published in Starblazer.

In 2012, Birch set up Modiphius Entertainment with himself as the Chief Creative Officer, and used Kickstarter to raise the funds for the production of Achtung! Cthulhu, which Birch produced and directed. Birch co-founded the company with his partner Rita. Birch was the publishing director for Modiphius, and also organised the Dragonmeet convention in 2017.

Birch created the game Cohorts of Cthulhu. Birch developed the universe of the Dreams and Machines role-playing game.
