= 2011 Origins Award winners =

The following are the winners of the 38th annual (2011) Origins Award, presented at Origins 2012:

Category	Winner	Company	Designer(s)
Best Roleplaying Game	Arcanis	Paradigm Concepts	Eric Wiener, Pedro Barrenechea, and Henry Lopez
Best Roleplaying Supplement or Adventure	Shadows over Scotland (Call of Cthulhu)	Cubicle 7 Entertainment	Stuart Boon
Best Board Game	Conquest of Nerath	Wizards of the Coast	Richard Baker, Mons Johnson, & Peter Lee
Best Traditional Card Game	NUTS!	Wildfire LLC	Matthew Grau
Best Family, Party or Children's Game	Get Bit!	Mayday Games	Dave Chalker
Best Miniatures Figure or Line	Storm Strider	Privateer Press	
Best Miniatures Rules or Expansion	Battletech: The Wars of Reaving	Catalyst Game Labs	Ben H. Rome, Herbert A. Beas, Paul Sjardijn
Best Collectible Card Game or Expansion	Magic: The Gathering : Innistrad	Wizards of the Coast	
Best Gaming Accessory	Shadowrun Runner's Toolkit	Catalyst Game Labs	Elissa Carey, Rusty Childers, Cole Davidson, Mark Dynna, Adam Jury, Robyn King-Nitschke, Adam Large, Drew Littell, Elizabeth Nold, Brandie Tarvin, Peter Taylor, Malik Toms, Michael Wich, Russell Zimmerman
Best Game-Related Publication	The Kobold Guide to Board Game Design	Open Design LLC	Mike Selinker with Rob Daviau, James Ernest, Matt Forbeck, Richard Garfield, Dave Howell, Steve Jackson, John Kovalic, Richard C. Levy, Andrew Looney, Michelle Nephew, Paul Peterson, Lisa Steenson, Jeff Tidball, Teeuwynn Woodruff, and Dale Yu
Best Historical Board Game	Strike of the Eagle	Academy Games	Brian Bennett, Uwe Eickert, Robert Żak
Best Historical Miniatures Rules or Expansion	Flames of War: Cassino	Battlefront Miniatures Ltd.	
Best Historical Miniatures Figure or Line	Bolt Action WW2	Warlord Games	
Best Play by Mail or Correspondence Game	Heroic Fantasy	Flying Buffalo Inc	Rick Loomis and Steve MacGregor
