= Gareth-Michael Skarka =

American designer

- Occupation: Game designer

Gareth-Michael Skarka is an author and game designer who founded Adamant Entertainment and has worked primarily on e-published role-playing games.

== Career ==
Gareth-Michael Skarka designed the cinematic role-playing game Hong Kong Action Theatre! (1996), which was first published by the small-press RPG company Event Horizon Productions. Skarka co-authored the swashbuckling Skull & Bones (2003) campaign background supplement for the Mythic Vistas series from Green Ronin Publishing. Based in Lawrence, Kansas, Skarka started his company Adamant Entertainment in 2003, publishing material largely for the electronic market, and with a focus on role-playing games. Skarka later supported Skull & Bones through Adamant Entertainment. When regular Cubicle 7 editor Dominic McDowall-Thomas was unavailable due to a consultancy contract, Skarka filled in to edit Starblazer Adventures (2008).

Adamant Entertainment has designed licensed role-playing downloads for Doctor Who and Star Trek along with original worlds.

=== Far West ===
In 2011, Skarka ran a Kickstarter campaign which attracted $49,324 in funding for development and publication of his Far West role-playing game, and had regularly posted updates to his Kickstarter after missing deadlines. Far West was intended as a transmedia project including a fiction collection (Tales of the Far West, published in e-book format 30 January 2012) and a role-playing game (Far West Adventure Game, intended for release in December 2011, but still incomplete as of the 10th anniversary of the project’s successful funding). Skarka maintained in 2021 that he intended to release the product despite the fact that no progress was demonstrated for over a decade. It was finally published on September 8, 2023.
