= Angus Abranson =

British designer

- Occupations: Game publisher, Game designer, poet

Angus Abranson is a game designer, publisher and poet who has worked primarily on role-playing games.

== Career ==
Angus Abranson began playing Advanced Dungeons & Dragons in 1984, and began working for Leisure Games by age 14, which one of the biggest London game retailers at the time. From the late 1980s to the early 1990s, Abranson also wrote for British role-playing game magazines such as Adventurer (1986-1987). Abranson was also one of the people behind the foundation of the magazine Valkyrie in 1994 for which he regularly reported news, reviews and editorials.

Abranson was one of a team of London-based UK roleplaying industry professionals, including James Wallis, Simon Rogers and others, who grouped together to resurrect the "Dragonmeet" convention in 2000. Abranson brought Dragonmeet outright in 2005 and subsequently merged Dragonmeet with Cubicle 7 in 2009.

Abranson and Dave Allsop were flatmates by 2003, and they formed a new role-playing game company called Cubicle 7. The initial priority for the company was the game SLA Industries by Allsop, so Abranson announced a publishing schedule for 2004 which included five SLA Industries books, and as the year began he had the first two of these books in the layout stage. Abranson and Dominic McDowall-Thomas were friends who often gamed and went clubbing together, and McDowall-Thomas agreed to help edit the SLA Industries supplements for Abranson. Abranson and McDowall-Thomas formally started Cubicle 7 Entertainment Limited in late 2006 as partners. Abranson and McDowall-Thomas continued to focus on the business portion of the company, so they assigned Ian Sturrock and Andrew Peregrine to create the second edition of Victoriana. Abranson recruited Chris Birch to author the licensed Starblazer Adventures role-playing game. Abranson and McDowall-Thomas acquired the Doctor Who license and needed investment by the end of 2008 to publish the game, so they approached Matthew Sprange of Mongoose Publishing who introduced them to the Rebellion Group. Abranson and McDowall-Thomas finally became able to work full-time at Cubicle 7 in March 2009, so Abranson left Leisure Games after 24 years. Abranson had made some long-time connections within the games industry, allowing Cubicle 7 to begin partnering with more than 20 other companies. Cubicle 7 also acquired a number of licenses such as Charles Stross's The Laundry Files and Lord of the Rings. The Cubicle 7 print partnerships were not as successful as hoped, reportedly having a "disastrous effect on the company's cashflow", and in November 2011 Abranson left Cubicle 7 to form Chronicle City. He continued the print partnership model at Chronicle City, while Cubicle 7 largely abandoned it,

Abranson went on to partner with long-time associate James Desborough, who was appointed creative director at Chronicle City in 2013.

Whilst at Cubicle 7, Abranson, along with Fred Hicks of Evil Hat Productions, Arc Dream Publishing, Cellar Games, Pelgrane Press, and Rogue Games founded the Bits and Mortar Retailer Initiative in 2010.

Abranson has been a guest at a number of gaming conventions around the world, most significantly a Gen Con Industry Insider Guest in 2013 Origins Game Fair Special Guest in 2011, and UK Games Expo where he was also part of the UK Games Expo Dragons Den in 2014.

In 2016 Abranson was appointed business director at EN Publishing.

Abranson has written or contributed to a number of role-playing game book and magazines, such as Hillfolk by Pelgrane Press and Cabal by Corone Design.

Abranson had a poetry anthology called Wild Card Symphonies published through Winter House Press in 2017.
