= Legends of Anglerre =

Tabletop fantasy role-playing game

Legends of Anglerre is a role-playing game published by Cubicle 7 in 2010.

== Description ==
Legends of Anglerre is a Fate system game. Legends was a sequel to the 2008 Starblazer Adventures RPG, and like the earlier game drew on material from the Starblazer comic series. Where the first game focussed on the science fiction elements that appeared in the series, Legends drew on the various Fantasy Issues - especially the titular Anglerre series (Starblazer issues 200, 224, 231, 250 and 271) originally written by Mike Chinn - to present generic Fantasy rules for Fate, along with two detailed settings: Anglerre, and The Hither Kingdoms.

Legends of Anglerre was written by Sarah Newton and Chris Birch, with Mike Chinn, David Donachie, Doug Laedtke, Tom Miskey, Mike Olson, and Marc Reyes.

== Publication history ==
Legends of Anglerre was published by Cubicle 7 in 2010.

In March 2014, Cubicle 7 announced they would no longer publish or support the game as their licensing agreement had come to an end. No second edition of the core rulebook was printed since its initial 2010 offering and all PDF material was removed from its online store.

With the ending of the license agreement ownership of The Hither Kingdoms setting reverted to Mindjammer Press.

== Supplements ==
The Legends of Anglerre Companion was released in 2012. It was written by Chris Birch, Chris Dalgety, David Donachie, Sarah Newton, Mike Olson and Marc Reyes. It supplied additional rules for Cities, Families and Islands as adventure elements, and included rules for cities in the Anglerre setting and Islands in the Hither Kingdoms setting, as well as two sample adventures (The Sirens of Simris and Dreams on Dragon Island).

== Reviews ==
- Black Gate #15 (Spring 2011)
