= Adventures in Middle-earth =

Tabletop role-playing game

Adventures in Middle-Earth
- Cover of the Player's Guide
- Designers: Dominic McDowall-Thomas, Jon Hodgson, Francesco Nepitello, Marco Maggi
- Publishers: Cubicle 7
- Publication: 2016
- Genres: Fantasy
- Systems: D&D 5e

Adventures in Middle-Earth is a tabletop role-playing game originally published by Cubicle 7 in 2016 that uses the milieu of J. R. R. Tolkien's fantasy trilogy The Lord of the Rings.

== Description ==
Adventures in Middle-Earth is set in the 60-year period between the Battle of Five Armies at the end of The Hobbit and the second departure of Bilbo Baggins from The Shire that marks the beginning of The Lord of the Rings. Adventures take place to the east of the Misty Mountains, in the Wilderlands of Erebor around the Lonely Mountain, as well as the Mirkwood Forest.

The game uses a somewhat modified set of rules drawn from the fifth edition of Dungeons & Dragons under the Open Game License (OGL) created by Wizards of the Coast. Due to the relatively low use of magic and the lack of magical healing in Tolkien's works, the usual D&D rules and character classes built around magic and healing are not used. Instead, the system introduces new character classes, as well as new Cultures, Virtues and Backgrounds more in keeping with the Middle-earth setting. Similarly, magic items usually found in D&D are replaced by "heirlooms", items of lesser power that nevertheless are valuable in the low-magic setting.

== Publication history ==
In 2011, Cubicle 7 published The One Ring, a licensed fantasy role-playing game set in Tolkien's wilderness of Eriador west of the Misty Mountains that used an original set of rules. Five years later Cubicle 7 released a new Tolkien-related role-playing game, Adventures in Middle-earth, set to the east of the Misty Mountains that used D&D rules under the OGL. The Player's Guide was the first Middle-earth property released, a 224-page hardcover book designed by James Brown, Paul Butler, Walt Ciechanowski, Steve Emmott, Gareth Ryder-Hanrahan, John Hodgson, Shane Ivey, Andrew Kenrick, T. S. Luikart, Dominic McDowall-Thomas, Francesco Nepitello, James Spahn, and Ken Spencer, with interior art by John Howe, Jon Hodgson, Jason Juta, Naomi Robinson, Sam Manley, Jan Pospisil, Andrew Hepworth, and Tomas Jedrusek, cartography by Paul Bourne, and cover art by John Howe. Over the next three years, Cubicle 7 released a variety of source books and adventures for the Middle-earth setting.

In November 2019, Cubicle 7 announced that publication of both The One Ring and Adventures in Middle-earth would cease due to contractual issues with the license holder. The game license for both systems was subsequently acquired by Free League Publishing in 2020. In August 2022, Free League Publishing announced that it would be publishing The Lord of the Rings Roleplaying, an adaptation of the second edition of The One Ring (released in 2021) that also uses a modified version of the D&D fifth edition ruleset, with preorders for the game's core compendium scheduled to open in fall 2022 and a retail release planned for early 2023.

== Reception ==
John Farrell of Gaming Trend called Adventures in Middle-earth the "reunion of two franchises [Dungeons & Dragons and Lord of the Rings] that in many ways directly created the modern conception of fantasy wholecloth." However, Farrell noted that however the two franchises had been thematically joined in the beginning, "we have seen a stark divergence in how fantasy is presented under the two legacies." Farrell liked Cubicle 7's changes to the rules to make a low-magic system more in line with Tolkien's world, but noted that "none of it can completely escape being an adaptation of a game that was never made with Middle-earth in mind." Farrell concluded by giving Adventures in Middle-earth an above-average rating of 85%, saying the game "remains an engaging and exciting experience. Adapting itself to the 5E engine has diluted it in a few ways, but has mostly given us a fresh, intelligent way to experience Middle-earth. The good design choices far outweigh the questionable ones, resulting in a stylish, exciting, dark mystery that I am eager to experience."

Lindsay Janice of Gamers Decide liked the new parts of the rules system, saying the game "truly brings its own originality when being compared to other iconic games." Although she admitted that players would need to purchase a variety of books, she thought that these were cheaper and therefore better value compared to other systems. Janice concluded by giving the game an above-average rating of 8 out of 10, commenting, "Adventures in Middle-Earth is the game for those Tolkien fans that want to be more immersed in Middle-Earth and have their own character walking through the iconic hills of the Shire, or through the valley of Rivendell."

== Awards ==
At the 2018 Origins Awards, Adventures in Middle-earth won in the category "Best Role-playing Game of 2017".

== Products ==
Title	Release date (PDF format)	Notes & Ref
Player's Guide	September 7, 2016	
Loremaster's Guide	January 31, 2017	
Wilderland Adventures	April 19, 2017	
Rhovanion Region Guide	July 5, 2017	
The Eaves of Mirkwood & Loremaster's Screen	July 31, 2017	
The Road Goes Ever On	August 29, 2017	
The Mirkwood Campaign	November 9, 2017	
Rivendell Region Guide	March 13, 2018	
Eriador Adventures	May 23, 2018	
Bree-land Region Guide	March 14, 2019	
Lonely Mountain Region Guide	August 9, 2019	
Erebor Adventures	September, 2019	
Rohan Region Guide	November, 2019	PDF only
Moria	2019 (cancelled)	deluxe boxed set
