= Mike Chinn =

UK writer

- Born: 31 December 1954 (age 71); Birmingham, UK
- Occupations: Writer, editor
- Writing career
- Pen name: Clifton Davies, James Michaels
- Genres: Horror, Fantasy, Science Fiction, Pulp Adventure, Western

Mike Chinn is a horror, fantasy, science fiction and comics writer from Birmingham, England.

Chinn has been nominated for the British Fantasy Award for Best Collection and Best Short Story.

He created the Anglerre fantasy series and Robot Kid science fiction books for the Starblazer comic, published by D. C. Thomson & Co. Ltd. Starblazer has been resurrected as a licensed role-playing game from Cubicle 7 Entertainment, entitled Starblazer Adventures. Chinn has contributed to the RPG supplement Legends of Anglerre, based on the Anglerre world and characters that he created for Starblazer.

In 1998, Midlands-based, British Fantasy Award winning publisher The Alchemy Press published their first paperback: six short stories featuring Chinn's pulp adventure heroes, Damian Paladin and adventuress Leigh Oswin, The Paladin Mandates (which was itself short listed in the 1999 British Fantasy Awards, Best Collection and Best Short Story categories). In 2017, Pro Se Productions published further adventures of Paladin and Leigh in Walkers in Shadow. In 2015 the first of his Sherlock Holmes related pastiches was published.

He has edited four anthologies for The Alchemy Press: Swords Against the Millennium and three volumes of The Alchemy Press Book of Pulp Heroes.

== Bibliography ==
=== Comics ===
==== Starblazer ====
- 64 - The Exterminator (1982)
- 141 - Spaceroamer (1985)
- 172 - Nightraider (1986)
- 200 - Demon Sword (1987)
- 204 - The Robot Kid (1987)
- 224 - Rune War (1988)
- 230 - A Plague of Horsemen (1988)
- 231 - Godstone (1988)
- 232 - Return of the Robot Kid (1989)
- 247 - Kayn's Quest (1989)
- 248 - Tales of the Otherworld (1989)
- 250 - Sun Prince (1989)
- 271 - The Triune Warrior (1990)
- 273 - The Robot Kid Strikes Back! (1990)

==== The Beano ====
- Billy the Cat

=== Short fiction ===
- Designs of the Wizard (Second Dragons pt.1) (Dark Horizons 10, 1974)
- Shadows of the Weaver (Second Dragons pt.2) (Dark Horizons 12, 1975)
- The Closing of the Days (Second Dragons pt.3) (Dark Horizons 14, 1976)
- The Pistol and the Sword (Dark Horizons, 1979)
- Sic Transit… (Fantasy Tales 8, 1981)
- But the Stones Will Stand (Fantasy Tales 10, 1982)
- The Death-Wish Mandate (Kadath Vol.2 #1, 1982)
- Nightfall of a Dying World (Dark Horizons 28, 1985)
- Thanksgiving Dinner (Winter Chills 2, 1987)
- The Hollywood Mandate (Fantasy Tales 17, 1987)
- Sword of Light (Adventure, A Victor Summer Special, 1987)
- Castigo (as Clifton Davis) (Mystique 1, 1988)
- Judas Goat (Vollmond, 1988)
- Death's Head (Cosmorama 1, 1988)
- Once Upon Beltane (The Edge 2, 1990)
- Day of the Dark Men (Fantasy Tales Vol.12 #6, 1991)
- Rescheduled (Final Shadows, 1991)
- Fair Dues (Dark Horizons 33, 1992)
- Desktop Priapism on your PCW (Chills 7, 1993)
- The Blood of Eden (The Mammoth Book of Dracula, 1997)
- Façades (Phantoms of Venice, 2001)
- Brindley's Place (Birmingham Noir, 2002)
- Suffer a Witch (Salvo, 2003)
- Two Weeks on Saturday (Dark Horizons, 2004)
- All Beauty Must Die (Dark Horizons, 2007)
- All Under Hatches Stow’d (Second Black Book of Horror, 2008)
- Like a Bird (Third Black Book of Horror, 2008)
- Parlour Games (Tales from the Smoking Room, 2008)
- Sailors of the Skies (Dark Horizons, 2009)
- Welcome to the Hotel Marianas (The Bitter End: Tales of Nautical Terror, 2009)
- Kittens (Raw Terror, 2009)
- The Appalachian Collection (Back to the Middle of Nowhere, 2010)
- A Matter of Degree (Null Immortalis (Nemonymous 10), 2010)
- Be Grateful When You're Dead (Dark Horizons, 2011)
- Hell Freezes Over (Doomology: The Dawning of Disasters, 2011)
- Only the Lonely (Dark Valentines, Spring 2011)
- Cold Rain (Morpheus Tales Urban Horror Special, 2011)
- Sons of the Dragon (Kzine 1, 2011)
- Sailors of the Skies, Kindle Edition (The Alchemy Press, 2011)
- Once Upon an Easter (Coach's Midnight Diner, 2012)
- Saving Prince Romero (Unfit for Eden: Postscripts 26/27, 2012)
- There'll Be a Hot Time in the Old Town Tonight (extended Kindle edition The Paladin Mandates, 2012)
- Harbor Lights (eFantasy Vol.1 #2, 2012)
- Holding It In (Ain't No Sanity Clause, 2012)
- Give Me These Moments Back (Unspoken Water, 2013)
- Cheechee's Out (Second City Scares - A Horror Express Anthology, 2013)
- The Pygmalion Conjuration (Tenth Black Book of Horror, 2013)
- Considering the Dead (Dark Muses, Spoken Silences, 2013)
- To Die For (BFS Journal, 2013)
- The Owl That Calls (WikiWorm, 2013)
- Bird's Over the Bullring (Weird Trails, 2013)
- Where The Long White Roadway Lies (Kneeling In the Silver Light, 2014)
- E is for Ecophobia (Phobophobias, 2014)
- R is for Radix Omnium Malum (The Grimorium Verum, 2015)
- Chasing the Dragon (Superhero Monster Hunter: The Good Fight, 2015)
- Deck the Halls (Occult Detective Monster Hunter: A Grimoire of Eldritch Inquests, 2015)
- A Function of Probability (The Adventures of Moriarty: The Secret Life of Sherlock Holmes's Nemesis, 2015)
- Fatal Planet (This Twisted Earth, 2016)
- The Adventure of the Vanishing Man (The MX Book of New Sherlock Holmes Stories V: Christmas Adventures, 2016)
- More Than Meets (Nebula Rift magazine, 2016)
- The Black Tarot (Occult Detective Quarterly #2, 2017)
- The Adventure of the Haunted Room (The MX Book of New Sherlock Holmes Stories VII: Eliminate the Impossible, 2017)
- Pierrot in Bombazine (The Further Adventures of Jerry Cornelius, 2018)
- Eigenspace X (Pickman's Gallery, 2018)
- And the Living is Easy (Weirdbook #40, 2018)
- Her Favourite Place (The Alchemy Press Book of Horrors, 2018)
- A World in Aspic (Kzine 23, 2019)
- Hastur La Vista, Baby (with Adrian Cole) (The Lovecraft Squad: Rising, 2020)
- Digging in the Dirt (The Alchemy Press Book of Horrors 2, 2020)
- The Direction of Sunbeams (Sherlock Holmes and the Occult Detectives volume 2, 2020)
- The Adventure of the Singular Worm (The MX Book of New Sherlock Holmes Stories Some More Untold Cases Part XXIII: 1888-1894, 2020)
- Cradle of the Deep (Startling Stories Magazine, 2021)
- Face of Heaven, Eyes of Hell (Phantasmagoria #18, 2021)
- The Essence of Dust (Swords & Sorceries, Tales of Heroic Fantasy Volume 2, 2021)
- All I Ever See (The Mammoth Book of Folk Horror, 2021)
- Echoes of Days Passed (The Alchemy Press Book of Horrors 3: A Miscellany of Monsters, 2021)
- The Rains of Barofonn (Swords & Sorceries, Tales of Heroic Fantasy Volume 3, 2021)
- Hall of Dreams (Gruesome Grotesques volume 6: Carnival of Freaks, 2021)
- The Stone of Ill Omen (The MX Book of New Sherlock Holmes Stories XXXII [1888-1895], 2022)
- Watcher of the Skies (Terror Tales of the West Country, 2022)
- The Airs of Eden (ResAliens 6, 2023)
- Lost in the Shuffle (Occult Detective Magazine 9, 2023)
- Threshold of a Dream (The Brumology: The Author City Birmingham Anthology, 2023)
- Where the Sun Has Never Shone [reworking of Day of the Dark Men] (ResAliens 7, 2023)
- The Mystery of the Unstolen Document (The MX Book of New Sherlock Holmes Stories XLI: Further Untold Cases [1887-1892] 2023)
- Hollingbourne Grange (The MX Book of New Sherlock Holmes Stories Spring 2024 Annual)
- Beyond the Ghost Caves (Phantasmagoria Magazine 24, 2024)
- The Return of Madame Sara (Sherlock and Friends: Eldritch Investigators, 2024)
- Two Swords Waiting (Swords & Heroes ezine, 2024)
- The Island of Lost Worlds (Weirdbook 49, 2025)

=== Novels/Novellas ===
- VALLIS TIMORIS (with Sir Arthur Conan Doyle) (Fringeworks, 2015)
- REVENGE IS A COLD PISTOL (Pro Se Publications, 2018)
- The Color of Nothing (Startling Stories magazine, 2022)
- HAIL THE NEW AGE (Saladoth Productions, 2024)
- CITADEL OF THE MOON (Saladoth Productions, 2025)

=== Damian Paladin ===
- The Death-Wish Mandate (Kadath Vol.2 #1, 1982)
- Thanksgiving Dinner (Winter Chills 2, 1987)
- The Hollywood Mandate (Fantasy Tales 17, 1987)
- THE PALADIN MANDATES (The Alchemy Press, 1998)
- Sailors of the Skies (Dark Horizons, 2009)
- SAILORS OF THE SKIES, Kindle Edition (The Alchemy Press, 2011)
- THE PALADIN MANDATES (extended Kindle edition, 2012)
- There'll Be a Hot Time in the Old Town Tonight (extended Kindle edition The Paladin Mandates, 2012)
- Fire All of the Guns At One Time (with Adrian Cole) (Nick Nightmare Investigates, 2014)
- Deck the Halls (Occult Detective Monster Hunter: A Grimoire of Eldritch Inquests, 2015)
- The Black Tarot (Occult Detective Quarterly #2, 2017)
- WALKERS IN SHADOW (Pro Se Productions, 2017)
- Hastur La Vista, Baby (with Adrian Cole) (The Lovecraft Squad: Rising, 2020)
- Digging in the Dirt (The Alchemy Press Book of Horrors 2, 2020)
- THE PALADIN MANDATES (revised and expanded, Pro Se Productions, 2020)
- Cradle of the Deep (Startling Stories Magazine, 2021)
- The Island of Lost Worlds (Weirdbook 49, 2025)

=== Collections ===
- THE PALADIN MANDATES (The Alchemy Press, 1998)
- GIVE ME THESE MOMENTS BACK (The Alchemy Press, 2015)
- RADIX OMNIUM MALUM & OTHER INCURSIONS (Parallel Universe Publications, 2017)
- WALKERS IN SHADOW (Pro Se Productions, 2017)
- THE PALADIN MANDATES (revised and expanded, Pro Se Productions, 2020)
- DRAWING DOWN LEVIATHAN (Saladoth Productions, 2024)
- WARRIORS OF THE BOUNDLESS (Saladoth Productions 2025)

=== Sherlock Holmes ===
- A Function of Probability (The Adventures of Moriarty: The Secret Life of Sherlock Holmes's Nemesis, 2015)
- The Adventure of the Vanishing Man (The MX Book of New Sherlock Holmes Stories V: Christmas Adventures, 2016)
- The Adventure of the Haunted Room (The MX Book of New Sherlock Holmes Stories VII: Eliminate the Impossible, 2017)
- The Direction of Sunbeams (Sherlock Holmes and the Occult Detectives volume 2, 2020)
- The Adventure of the Singular Worm (The MX Book of New Sherlock Holmes Stories XXIII: Some More Untold Cases [1888-1894] 2020)
- The Stone of Ill Omen (The MX Book of New Sherlock Holmes Stories XXXII [1888-1895], 2022)
- The Mystery of the Unstolen Document (The MX Book of New Sherlock Holmes Stories XLI: Further Untold Cases [1887-1892] 2023)
- Hollingbourne Grange (The MX Book of New Sherlock Holmes Stories Spring 2024 Annual)

=== As editor ===
- DARK HORIZONS 19–22 (BFS, 1979/80)
- MYSTIQUE - TALES OF WONDER (BFS)
- OUTSIDERS by John Oram (BFS Booklet 22, 1996)
- SWORDS AGAINST THE MILLENNIUM (The Alchemy Press, 2000)
- THE ALCHEMY PRESS BOOK OF PULP HEROES (The Alchemy Press, 2012)
- THE ALCHEMY PRESS BOOK OF PULP HEROES 2 (The Alchemy Press, 2013)
- THE ALCHEMY PRESS BOOK OF PULP HEROES 3 (The Alchemy Press, 2014)

=== Non-Fiction ===
- Spaghetti Bourbonais (Continental Modeller, 1987)
- Not Another Bloody Trilogy! (Dark Horizons 32, 1991)
- WRITING AND ILLUSTRATING THE GRAPHIC NOVEL (Barron’s Educational, 2004)
- CREATE YOUR OWN GRAPHIC NOVEL: FROM INSPIRATION TO PUBLICATION (Ilex, 2006)

=== Series ===
- THE MORIARTY PARADIGM
