= Judge Dredd (role-playing game) =

Tabletop science fiction role-playing games

Judge Dredd & The Worlds of 2000AD
Tabletop Adventure Game
- Designers: Darren Pearce; Nick Robinson; Robert J. Schwalb; Russ Morrissey
- Publishers: EN Publishing
- Publication: 2018; 7 years ago
- Genres: Science fiction
- Systems: D6 Dice Pool
- Website: Judge Dredd & The Worlds of 2000AD
- ISBN: 978-1-912007-70-7

Judge Dredd has been the inspiration for four role-playing game systems. These games are based on the fictional world of the Judge Dredd series from the British comic 2000AD. The role-playing games are unrelated to each other except for the setting.

== Games Workshop ==
The first, Judge Dredd roleplaying game, was published under license by Games Workshop in 1985, and used a rules system created specifically for the game, which resembled GW's Warhammer Fantasy Roleplay.

== Mongoose Publishing ==
Mongoose Publishing produced two versions of a Judge Dredd roleplaying game. In 2002, they acquired the rights to publish games set in the worlds created by 2000AD, and quickly released The Judge Dredd Roleplaying Game, which used the d20 rules system.

In 2009, they released a new version of Judge Dredd, using their Traveller rules set. Mongoose announced that their license was ending in late 2016.

== EN Publishing ==
In February 2017, EN Publishing announced the new Judge Dredd & The Worlds of 2000 AD Tabletop Adventure Game using the What's OLD is NEW (WOIN) roleplaying game system. The first releases were the Judge Dredd & The Worlds of 2000 AD core rulebook, and The Robot Wars adventure/sourcebook in early 2019. In November 2021, the company announced that their license to create 2000 AD products had come to an end.
