= Doctor Who Roleplaying Game =

Tabletop role-playing game

- Cover of the Twelfth Doctor edition
- Designers: David F. Chapman, Alasdair Stuart
- Illustrators: Lee Binding
- Publishers: Cubicle 7
- Publication: 2009
- Genres: Science fiction
- Systems: Vortex
- Website: Doctor Who RPG

The Doctor Who Roleplaying Game, formerly Doctor Who: Adventures in Time And Space is a role-playing game published by UK-based Cubicle 7 Entertainment. It is based on the BBC science fiction television programme Doctor Who, and allows roleplayers to adopt the role of characters from that fictional universe.

Unlike most RPGs, the rules featured in new editions of the game remain largely unchanged. The updates consist of layout, images, and characters with rules provided. The first edition matched the style of the David Tennant era, the second edition the Matt Smith, the third styled for the programme's fiftieth anniversary with characters and images from Day of the Doctor, while the fourth and most recent edition draws from the first series of the Peter Capaldi era. Beginning with the anniversary edition, the game shifted from the traditional European release format of a box containing dice, tokens, and multiple smaller books towards the American format of a large core rulebook.

The first edition core rules box set was released to critical acclaim in the fall of 2009.

A second edition, featuring significant changes to the ruleset, was released digitally by Cubicle 7 on 30 July 2021. A physical release is scheduled for Q2 2022.

== Publication history ==
Cubicle 7 announced their license to Doctor Who in December 2007; the TV series had been cancelled in 1989, but was brought back in 2005 and this was the version of the show that was licensed to Cubicle 7. Author Shannon Appelcline commented that "It was a big licence. So big, in fact, that it would totally turn Cubicle 7 on its head." He also noted that "The acquisition of the Doctor Who licence was part of a clever plan whereby Angus Abranson and Dominic McDowall-Thomas would take Cubicle 7's existing success and multiply it many times."

As of November 2010, three products had been released including the first edition box set, a Game Master's screen, and a box set supplement entitled "Aliens and Creatures".

In October 2012 Cubicle 7 released the Eleventh Doctor Edition of the game, focusing on the Matt Smith era of the show. The Eleventh Doctor Boxed Set box was a two part box, rather than a "pizza box" style box. Two sourcebooks were released using this edition's layout and style: Defending the Earth, a UNIT sourcebook, and The Time Traveller's Companion, an in-depth look at Time Lords and time travel. Three PDF-only adventures for the Eleventh Doctor were released in 2013: Cat's Eye, Medicine Man, The Ravens of Despair and a stand-alone version of Arrowdown, the Eleventh Doctor edition's introductory adventure.

In May 2013 Cubicle 7 began releasing a series of supplements, one for each of the Doctor's incarnations, starting with The First Doctor Sourcebook. As of 2022, the first twelve Doctors have had sourcebooks published in both hardback and PDF format.

In June 2014 Cubicle 7 released The Limited Edition Doctor Who Rulebook, presenting Doctor Who: Adventures in Time and Space as a single volume hardcover book for the first time. This featured character sheets reflecting the Doctor Who Anniversary Special Episode — "Day of the Doctor", and a number of specially commissioned spreads featuring The Doctors, their companions, adversaries and allies.

In 2015, the Twelfth Doctor Edition of the game was released, with a name change to simply Doctor Who Roleplaying Game. It features a new layout style to match Peter Capaldi's first series.

In 2021, a brand new revision of the game, marketed as Doctor Who: The Roleplaying Game - Second Edition - was announced. It was released digitally via PDF on 30 July 2021, with a physical release following in Q2 2022. The new edition contains significant changes to the ruleset, including the removal of Traits, the combining of combat-related Skills into a single Skill, and the addition of an Intuition Skill, along with the addition of an Experience Points system and other adjustments to the ruleset designed to streamline the process. A Starter Set, a first for the RPG system, is expected to be released in 2022, along with a new GM screen - the first since the original Gm screen was released in 2009.

== Game mechanics ==
The mechanics of the game are difficulty based. Characters have attributes (such as Strength and Ingenuity) and skills (such as Fighting and Technology) which they typically add together and then further add the results of two six-sided dice. The result is compared to a difficulty number normally set by the gamesmaster. Both success and failure are graduated, so that matching, or else exceeding the difficulty by only a small amount, indicates a successful action, but not a complete success. Exceeding the difficulty by a larger amount indicates complete success and exceeding it by a very great amount indicates success with an additional beneficial outcome. For example, if attempting to disguise oneself to get past some guards, the lowest level of success would get the character past the guards, but they would be suspicious and perhaps mention it to their superior later. A simple success would simply get the character past the guards, but the highest level of success might, for example, indicate that the guard radios ahead to let other guards know that they're legitimate visitors. Conversely, failure is also graded. In the previous example, the least degree of failure might merely result in the guard telling the character to go back and get their identification. A full failure and the guard will certainly realise he is being tricked and the greatest degree of failure could result in the character accidentally revealing who they really are, for example.

In addition to the normal mechanics of the game, players acquire Story Point tokens throughout the game, which they can spend to adjust both the results of their characters' actions and to influence the world around them. The greater the effect, the more Story Points need to be spent to achieve it. For example, to adjust their level of success or failure up or down a level, a player can spend one Story Point. Or a Story Point could be spent to achieve some small change to the game world, such as keys being left in a car or a Cyberman's gun jamming for a moment. Greater amounts can be spent for correspondingly greater effects; for example, if five points were spent, maybe the villain would fall in love with one of the characters or a group of UNIT soldiers show up to rescue the PCs.

Story Points are awarded by the gamesmaster for cleverness, good role-playing, heroism and for deliberate failure. For example, if the players allowed their characters to be captured, the gamesmaster might award them each a few Story Points for making the game more interesting. These Story Points may well be used in escaping later. Thus Story Points preserve a kind of credit-balance allowing players to participate in guiding the overall arc of the story without undermining the gamesmaster. Note that NPCs and monsters also have Story Points in relation to their plot significance. The gamesmaster is at liberty to spend these points on the NPCs behalf and they act as a gauge to determine how much adjusting of the world should be permitted for the NPC. For example, a lowly alien guard will have very few Story Points. If the PCs had tied the guard up earlier, perhaps the guard has just enough that can be spent to escape and sound the alarm. Whereas a major villain such as Davros will have many Story Points – enough to mysteriously escape a crashing spaceship by finding an escape pod.

== Nonviolence ==
Although the game does not forbid PCs from violence, violent solutions to problems are discouraged in a number of ways by the game. The most obvious method by which this is achieved is the Initiative system in which characters proceed according to the type of action they wish to take. In the game, this is called: "Talkers, Runners, Doers, Fighters". So if a player wishes their character's action to be trying to persuade people not to shoot at her, then that action takes place first. If another character wishes to run away, then that action takes place next. If a third character wishes to shoot out the lights so that their attackers can't see them, then that action takes place next (even though the action is a shooting action, it's not a 'Fighting' action). Finally, any characters wishing to fight the enemies (as well as the enemies that are shooting), take their turns. This system not only gives precedence to non-violent actions, but mirrors very closely what occurs in the Doctor Who show itself, where the Doctor frequently talks his way past enemies or, almost as often, runs away from them.

The second mechanical method by which violence is discouraged is simply the deadliness of combat in the game. Whilst Story Points act as a buffer helping prevent the actual deaths of a character, combat in the Doctor Who game tends to be swift and brutal, with many alien weapons simply doing "Lethal" damage, rather than a damage number. Characters that seek violent solutions to problems are at grave risk of injury, with damage being removed directly from character attributes.

Finally, the premise of Doctor Who makes many problems simply unsolvable by personal scale violence. Foiling an invading army of Cybermen cannot be done by individual fighting. Similarly, many alien threats are simply overwhelmingly powerful for humans to deal with. For example, there is no weapon in the core rule books that can actually damage a Dalek by the stats that are given for it.

== Reception ==
The first edition core rules box set was released to critical acclaim in the fall of 2009. It has gone on to win two awards including the Grog d'Or for Best Roleplaying Game 2010 and the UK Game Expo Best Roleplaying Game 2010. It was also nominated for the Origins Best Roleplaying Game 2010, the ENnies Product of the Year 2010, the Golden Geek Game of the Year 2010, and the Golden Geek Best Artwork & Presentation 2010.

The 11th Doctor Boxed Set won the Gold ENnie for Best Family game in 2013 The Time Traveller's Companion was awarded the Silver ENnie for best supplement in the 2013 ENnie Awards.

== See also ==
- The Doctor Who Role Playing Game, the first Doctor Who RPG, published in 1985 by FASA
- Time Lord, another Doctor Who RPG, published in 1991 by Virgin Publishing
