= Cthulhu Britannica =

Series of role-playing game supplements

Cthulhu Britannica is a series of role-playing game supplements produced by the British game company Cubicle 7 Entertainment for use in the Call of Cthulhu role-playing game produced by Chaosium. The series allows for games to be set in the United Kingdom.

== Publication history ==
Cubicle 7 used their license for Call of Cthulhu to publish the Cthulhu Britannica (2009) core book, the first product in the line which included five scenarios. Additional books were then released every year until 2012, including Shadows over Scotland. In 2013 a Kickstarter campaign was run in order to produce a boxed set and series of supplements set in London, with the London Boxed Set set being released in the following year. A dozen titles were produced for the Cthulhu Britannica line, and they spanned the British Isles with information from British folklore.

== Supplements ==
- Cthulhu Britannica a collection of five scenarios. These are set in different time periods with the first being in Victorian London and the last being set in the future.
- Avalon - The County of Somerset is a sourcebook detailing the county of Somerset. It includes four new scenarios as well as background information on setting games in the county.
- Shadows Over Scotland deals with Scotland in much the same way as Avalon deals with Somerset, although it is a far larger book. Six scenarios are included.
- Folklore details the use of British folklore in Call of Cthulhu games. It also includes nine plot hooks that can be fleshed out into larger adventures.
- London is a boxed set which consists of three books - guidebooks for the Keeper and for Investigators and a collection of adventures. There are also four poster-sized period maps and six sheets of hand-outs for use in games.
- The Curse of Nineveh is a campaign with seven adventures. It and its two companion books formed part of the Kickstarter campaign.
- The Journal of Neve Selibuc is a companion to The Curse of Nineveh and is used in conjunction with that book, providing the investigators with clues and information that can help them complete the scenarios.
- The Journal of Reginald Campbell Thompson is a second companion book to The Curse of Nineveh and also is used to provide clues.
- London Boxed Postcard Set is a collection of nineteen-twenties style postcards to be used as plot hooks in the game with a companion book expanding on the ideas provided. The cards are written by different role-playing game writers and was available exclusively to backers of the Kickstarter. It was due for release in 2016.
- Cards from the Smoke is a set of illustrated cards for use in the game. Each provides an illustration plus text about a location, person, threat, plot hook or other item that can be slipped into an adventure. Also part of the Kickstarter it was due for release in 2016.

== Awards ==
Shadows over Scotland won Best Roleplaying Supplement or Adventure at the 38th Annual Origins Awards (2011) and 'Gold' for Best Setting at the ENnie Awards (2012)

== Legacy ==
Stu Horvath in the 2023 book Monsters, Aliens, and Holes in the Ground, Deluxe Edition: A Guide to Tabletop Roleplaying Games from D&D to Mothership explained how "Before renovating Call of Cthulhu proper, Mike Mason and Paul Fricker did interesting work at the helm of Cthulhu Britannica for Cubicle 7 (2009), which also produced an odd fusion of war story and cosmic horror with their World War Cthulhu line (2013)."
