= Hobbit Tales =

Card game

Hobbit Tales from the Green Dragon Inn is a card game set in Middle-earth. It was designed by Marco Maggi and Francesco Nepitello, designers of War of the Ring and Battle of Five Armies, and published by Cubicle 7 in January 2014.

It uses the same 12-sided die as featured in The One Ring Roleplaying Game, and also includes a set of rules for using the cards in the roleplaying game.

== Gameplay ==
In Hobbit Tales players are Hobbits telling tales in front of a mug of beer at the Green Dragon Inn in the Shire. Woods and mountains, elves and orcs and more sinister things populate their stories.

During the game, players take turns as the Narrator and improvise a story using a hand consisting of illustrated cards. The other players try to twist the tale, interrupting the story to play hazard cards featuring hidden dangers and fearsome monsters.

After each round of play, players are rewarded with Cheers tokens for playing story cards or for interrupting successfully with hazard cards. The player with the most Cheers tokens at the end of the game wins.

== Development ==
Hobbit Tales was designed by Italian designers Francesco Nepitello and Marco Maggi.

== Reception ==
Diary of the Doctor Who Role-Playing Games notes that with games such as Cthulhu Fluxx, Hobbit Tales: From the Green Dragon Inn, and the Pathfinder Adventure Card Game: Rise of the Runelords, players should "Expect these easy to play and fun games to be a feature of the market for the next few years."

Bruno Bacelli of Italian FantasyMagazine felt that the game was good gun because it was of low complexity and would involve a reasonable playing time, depending on the number of players. Bocelli added that the game was best when players engaged in the narrative element with the cards and made efforts with inspiration and fair play.

Marco Arnaudo felt that Hobbit Tales was one of the games that "contributed to popularize the idea in the 21st century that Tolkien's materials could be experienced in the form of playable variants. In so doing, these designs demonstrated the persistent vitality of one of the earliest sources for storytelling in analog games," and that the design of Hobbit Tales "goes to show that the symbiosis between RPGs and board games we have examined throughout this book is still very strong, and there is no indication it may dissolve any time soon."

=== Awards ===
Hobbit Tales won a Silver ENnie for Best Family Game in 2014.

== Reviews ==
- Casus Belli (v4, Issue 13 - Jan/Feb 2015)
