= Russ Morrissey =

British game designer and journalist

Russell Ian Morrissey
- Born: United Kingdom
- Occupations: Reporter, game designer, podcaster, author
- Writing career
- Language: English
- Genres: Fantasy, sci-fi
- Notable works: The ENnies, EN World, Judge Dredd & The Worlds of 2000 AD RPG Core Rulebook, W.O.I.N. (What's O.L.D. IS N.E.W.), Level Up: Advanced 5th Edition
- Website: enworld.org

Russ Morrissey - also known as Morrus - is a British reporter, game designer, podcaster, author, and owner of EN World. Morrissey founded the ENnie Awards in 2001, which he ran until 2018. He also founded the book publisher EN Publishing, and the tabletop-gaming news website EN World, both of which he runs currently.

== Career ==
=== EN World and EN Publishing ===
Morrissey wrote his first tabletop RPG at the age of 14 in 1984. He founded d20reviews.com in 1999, which was renamed EN World, also known as Morrus' Unofficial Tabletop RPG News in 2001, a tabletop RPG news website and community.

In 2001, Morrissey founded the publishing company EN Publishing and has gone on to publish over 300 books under the brand.

In 2014 under EN Publishing, Morrissey wrote and published the W.O.I.N. Roleplaying Game System (What's O.L.D. IS N.E.W.).

In 2014, he was a judge on the Paizo design competition RPG Superstar.

In February 2017 Morrissey announced that he would be creating the new officially licensed Judge Dredd roleplaying game. This was later crowdfunded on Kickstarter in late 2018 and successfully funded with over 2000 backers. The Judge Dredd & The Worlds of 2000 AD roleplaying game was released immediately after the Kickstarter campaign and uses the W.O.I.N. system developed by Morrissey several years earlier.

In October 2020 Morrissey's company announced the Awfully Cheerful Engine, a comic-book inspired tabletop game. In August of the same year, he announced a project codenamed Level Up, an advanced take on Dungeons & Dragons 5th Edition. The game was published in 2021.

In February 2024 Morrissey wrote the article 'The Rise And Fall Of Evil Genius Games' which investigated the sudden resignation of multiple staff members, the lawsuit between EGG and Netflix over the official Rebel Moon tabletop roleplaying game, the use of Web3 technology, and problems with the company's work environment.

=== The ENnies ===
Morrissey founded the Gen Con EN World RPG Awards (the ENnie Awards) in 2001, which he ran until 2018. The ENnies were created as an annual fan-based award for tabletop role-playing game products, and since 2002 were hosted at Gen Con in Indianapolis, Indiana.

=== The Perturbed Dragon and Battle of the Bards ===
In 2012, Morrissey and his brother Darren Morrissey co-wrote a six-part animated cartoon series called The Perturbed Dragon. This comedy series played on the tropes and cliches of tabletop gaming, and culminated in a music competition called Battle of the Bards.

=== Morrus’ Unofficial Tabletop RPG Talk ===
In 2018 Morrissey launched a tabletop news and sketch comedy podcast called Morrus’ Unofficial Tabletop RPG Talk, which has run for over 300 episodes. The show is presented by Morrissey and his co-hosts Peter Coffey and Jessica Hancock, and features weekly guests and topics. Morrus' Unofficial Tabletop RPG Talk is currently funded through Patreon. The podcast has include guests such as Keith Baker (game designer), Sean K. Reynolds, Jason Bulmahn, Jonathan Tweet, Lily Marriner-Dodds, Owen K.C. Stephens, Dominic McDowall-Thomas, Chris Spivey, Monte Cook, and Ryan Dancey.

=== The Cauldron ===
Morrissey's science fiction novel The Siege of Concordant, set in a galaxy called The Cauldron, was released in 2020.

== Bibliography ==
- 2000-pr Editor-in-Chief, EN World
- 2000-pr Publisher, EN Publishing
- 2001–19 Founder, Gen Con EN World RPG Awards (“ENnies”)
- 2002 Co-author, Tournaments, Fairs, and Taverns
- 2002 Co-author, Four-Color to Fantasy
- 2008 Author, Advanced Rules for Beginners
- 2008 Co-author, War of the Burning Sky #12: The Beating of the Aquiline Heart
- 2010 Author, Paragons of the Burning Sky
- 2011 Author, Space Fight!
- 2012 Co-writer, The Perturbed Dragon cartoon series
- 2013 Co-author, Russ Morrissey’s To Slay A Dragon
- 2015 Co-author, Russ Morrissey’s To Stake A Vampire
- 2015 Author, Starship Construction Manual
- 2016 Author, What’s OLD is NEW Starter Kit
- 2016 Author, N.E.W. The Science Fiction Roleplaying Game
- 2016 Author, Real Solspace: A Guide to our Stellar Neighbourhood
- 2016-pr Publisher, EN5ider Magazine
- 2016–20 Publisher, TRAILseeker Magazine
- 2017-pr Publisher, EONS Magazine
- 2017 Author, Universal Upgrades
- 2017 Author, O.L.D. The Fantasy Heroic Roleplaying Game
- 2017 Author, Trappist
- 2017 Author, The Moons of Boria
- 2017 Co-author, Xenomorphs: The Fall of Somerset Landing
- 2018–present Co-presenter, Morrus’ Unofficial Tabletop RPG Talk podcast
- 2018 Co-author, Judge Dredd & The Worlds of 2000 AD
- 2018 Co-author, Starship Recognition Manual
- 2018 Co-author, N.O.W. The Modern Action Roleplaying Game
- 2018 Co-author, Judge Dredd & The Worlds of 2000 AD Quickstart
- 2018 Co-author, The Dark Decade: From Dust Till Dawn
- 2018 Author, Galactic Sentience Catalog
- 2018 Co-author, Spirits of Manhattan
- 2018 Author, Santiago: A Myth of the Far Future
- 2019 Author, Simply6: The Fast, Universal RPG
- 2020 Co-author, SolSpace: The Spartan Gambit
- 2020 Co-author, Mythological Figures & Maleficent Monsters
- 2020 Author, The Siege of Concordant
- 2020 Project Lead, Level Up
- 2020 Author, Awfully Cheerful Engine
- 2021 Co-author, Spirits of Manhattan
- 2021 Co-Lead Design, Adventurer's Guide
- 2021 Co-Lead Design, Trials & Treasure
- 2021 Co-Lead Design, Monstrous Menagerie
- 2022 Co-author, To Save A Kingdom
- 2023 Co-author, What's OLD is NEW Starter Box
- 2023 Co-author, Level Up Starter Box
- 2024 Co-author, Voidrunner's Codex
- 2024 Co-author, Star Captain's Manual

== Media mentions ==
Russ Morrissey has appeared on the following podcasts, radio shows, videos, and articles.

- Keith Baker: Six Questions: Russell Morrissey
- Mud & Blood Podcast: Judge Dredd Interview With Russ Morrissey
- Shane Plays Radio Show: Full Version Of W.O.I.N. RPG Interview With Russ Morrissey
- Tabletop Babble Podcast: Morrus
- Farsight Blogger: Russell Morrissey of EN World
- Shane Plays Radio Show: EN World & The ENnies with Russ Morrissey
- Shane Plays Radio Show: D&D Gets Classier with Morrus & Peter!
- Gamers Web: The British Are Coming AGAIN: Judge Dredd and the Worlds of 2000AD Roleplaying Game Interviews and Insights
- Rand Roll: On Random Generators with Russ Morrissey of EN World
- Mildra: Interview with Russ Morissey of EN World
- Design Notes: 10 Questions plus 1! Russ Morrissey
- The Bedrock Blog: Russ Morrissey Interview: O.L.D. and N.E.W. RPGs
- RPGnet: Russell Morrissey, What Is Old Is New
- BJ Geek Nation Podcast: Russ Morrissey with What's Old Is New RPG
- The Tome Show: New Ranger and Evolution of RPGs Podcast
- The Smart Party: Judge Dredd and the Worlds of 2000AD (Interview with Russ Morrissey)
- Plot Points: Maleficent Mythological Monsters For 5E
- Shane Plays: Mythological Figures & Maleficent Monsters for 5E
- Tabletop Babble: Morrus
- RPG Publisher Spotlight: EN Publishing
- Bald And Board: 5th Edition
- Shane Plays Geek Talk: Advanced 5E RPG Sneak Preview
- Polygon
