= Mindjammer - The Roleplaying Game =

Tabletop role-playing game

Mindjammer
- Designers: Sarah Newton
- Publishers: Cubicle 7 (Mindjammer - Starblazer Adventures in the Second Age of Space); Mindjammer Press (Mindjammer - The Roleplaying Game)
- Genres: transhuman Science fiction space opera
- Systems: Fate Core System

Mindjammer - The Roleplaying Game is a space opera role-playing game (RPG) created by Sarah Newton, published by Mindjammer Press in 2014, and distributed by Modiphius Entertainment.

== Description ==
Mindjammer is set in the distant future, when humans have spread across the universe, and in some cases have evolved into Hominids, races with new abilities. Humans have also raised various animals to sentience (Xenomorphs), have created androids (Synthetics) to use as cheap labor, as well as sentient spaceships. Altogether, these are known as the Commonality. In their explorations, humans have encountered a race dubbed the Venus, who have become the mortal enemies of the Commonality.

The game uses the Fate System. Players can create player characters that can be anything from humans to hominids, xenomorphs, synthetics, aliens, or sentient spaceships. Characters are defined by traits that serve as modifiers for dice rolls.

== Publication history ==
In 2008, Cubicle 7 Entertainment published a space opera RPG, Starblazer Adventures that used the FATE System. A year later, Sarah Newton created a background supplement titled Mindjammer. In March 2014, Cubicle 7 announced they would no longer publish or support the game as their licensing agreement had come to an end. Newton subsequently re-published Mindjammer as a standalone RPG later the same year.

Sarah Newton credits "the creativeness and generosity of Fred Hicks, Rob Donoghue, and Leonard Balsera and all the team at Evil Hat Productions, creators of the Fate Core system" for making her game Mindjammer - The Roleplaying Game (2014) possible.

The first adventure supplement for the second edition, Hearts and Minds, was published in 2015. In November 2015, Mindjammer Press ran a successful Kickstarter campaign that funded a massive expansion of the line. By 2018, ten new supplements had been published, as well as a version of the game for use with Traveller.

== Reception ==
Steve Dean of the British Fantasy Society was impressed, calling the second edition book "a solid chunk of SF goodness, printed on high-quality paper [...] The internal artwork is good but not intrusive and leaves plenty of room for the content." Dean concluded with a strong recommendation, saying, "Overall, this is an impressive volume of work. I would say it achieves everything it sets out to do, and does it with style, quality, and passion. Sarah Newton, and all her Newtonians, deserve a hearty round of applause. If I was giving out scores, this would be a perfect 10."

In a review of Mindjammer in Black Gate, Howard Andrew Jones said "lest you think that it’s somehow bereft of fun because it is a little more plausible, rest assured that it oozes adventure. Scenario hooks are sprinkled throughout the text, and story ideas blaze up from nearly every page."

== Other reviews and commentary ==
- Freelance Traveller #54/55 (June/July 2014) and #89 (Sept-Oct 2018)
- Le Maraudeur #15 (Dec 2014, in French)

== Awards ==
- The first edition of Mindjammer won a Judges' Choice Award at the 2018 ENnie Awards.
- The second edition won a Griffie Award at the 2014 Conpulsion RPG convention, was a finalist for a 2014 Golden Geek RPG of the Year, and was nominated for two ENnies.
