= Dominic McDowall-Thomas =

British game designer

- Occupation: Game designer

Dominic McDowall-Thomas is a game designer and publisher who has worked primarily on role-playing games and card games.

== Career ==
Dominic McDowall-Thomas is a consultant specializing in leadership and communications. McDowall-Thomas and Angus Abranson were friends and often gamed and clubbed together, and on January 1, 2004 he agreed to edit SLA Industries supplements for Abranson, starting with Hunter Sheets Issue One. Abranson and McDowall-Thomas formed Cubicle 7 Entertainment Limited in late 2006, and that they would be partners. Abranson and McDowall-Thomas assigned the creation of the second edition of the Victoriana role-playing game to Ian Sturrock and Andrew Peregrine, as they focused on the business end of the company. McDowall-Thomas worked as the main editor for Cubicle 7, but while was busy working on a consultancy contract, Gareth-Michael Skarka took over to edit Starblazer Adventures (2008). Abranson and McDowall-Thomas acquiring the Doctor Who license, and needed financial investment by the end of 2008, so they approached Matthew Sprange of Mongoose Publishing who helped them make a deal with the Rebellion Group. Abranson and McDowall-Thomas were then able to finally take Cubicle 7 full-time in March 2009. Cubicle 7 announced in January 2010 that they secured the license to Lord of the Rings, and McDowall-Thomas and Robert Hyde of Sophisticated Games led the project, along with lead designer Francesco Nepitello.

Abranson left Cubicle 7 in November 2011 after the reported failure of the print partnerships he oversaw. With McDowall-Thomas in sole charge of the company it went from financial crisis to turn over a million dollars within two years.

In 2012 the Mcdowall-penned "Words of the Wise" won the Silver ENnie award for best free product.

Under Mcdowall's CEOship, Cubicle 7 expanded beyond its original roleplaying games remit, into card games, and dice games.

Cubicle 7 announced in December 2014 that the company had left the Rebellion Developments group after McDowall led Cubicle 7 in a successful buy out of management.

In July 2016, still under Mcdowall's sole leadership, Cubicle 7 announced "Adventures in Middle-earth" an OGL setting guide for Middle-earth, bringing Tolkien's work to the Dungeons & Dragons ruleset for the first time.
