= Skull & bones game =

Skull & Bones game may refer to:

- Skull & Bones (role-playing game)
- Skull and Bones (video game)
