= Matthew Sprange =

Game designer

- Occupation: Game designer

Matthew Sprange is a game designer who has worked primarily on role-playing games.

== Career ==
Matthew Sprange met with Alex Fennell in a Swindon, England pub in late 2000; Sprange offered to start a game company with him, but Fennell instead went to work for a 3G mobile communication company. Sprange spent the next six months working on the rules for what would be a miniatures game but when he realized that this game would cost too much to produce, he instead decided to form the game company Mongoose Publishing with Fennell to publish adventures using the d20 license from Wizards of the Coast. Sprange was inexperienced with writing adventure scenarios, and since many other companies were already publishing adventures, he decided to publish sourcebooks beginning with The Slayer's Guide to Hobgoblins (2001), the first in a series of "ecology" books focusing on types monstrous creatures. Thanks to good sales on that first book, Sprange started working for Mongoose full-time, joining Fennell. Sprange learned that Paradigm Concepts announced a supplement titled "The Essential Elf" (ultimately published as Eldest Sons: The Essential Guide to Elves in 2003), and he added The Quintessential Elf (2002) right away to the publishing schedule so Mongoose would beat Paradigm Concepts to print and protect their Quintessential book line. Sprange designed the new edition of RuneQuest, which Mongoose published in 2006. Sprange helped Angus Abranson and Dominic McDowall-Thomas of Cubicle 7 when they needed investment by the end of 2008, so he introduced them to the Rebellion Group that Mongoose was now part of. Sprange designed the Lone Wolf Multiplayer Game Book (2010), based on the LoneWolf solo gamebook series.
