= Nightfall Games =

Game publisher

- Type: Private
- Industry: Role-playing publisher
- Founded: 1990
- Headquarters: Glasgow, Scotland
- Key people: Benn Graybeaton, Dave Allsop, Jared Earle, Mark Rapson
- Products: SLA Industries, The Terminator RPG, StokerVerse Roleplaying Game, SINS, Demon Dog
- Website: nightfall.games

Nightfall Games is a United Kingdom based role-playing game publishing company notable for publishing SLA Industries and The Terminator RPG.

== History ==
Nightfall Games was founded by Dave Allsop, Anne Boylan and Jared Earle in April 1993 in Glasgow, Scotland. In September 1993, Nightfall released their role-playing game SLA Industries. After releasing their first sourcebook Karma in 1994, Nightfall was purchased by Wizards of the Coast (WotC). Nightfall was started up again in 1998 by Allsop, Earle and Tim Dedopulos after regaining the rights to SLA Industries from WotC. In 1999, Nightfall partnered with Hogshead Publishing to continue publishing SLA. Hogshead closed operations in November 2002, after which Nightfall partnered with Cubicle 7 Entertainment. In 2004, Dave Allsop, the creator of SLA Industries, temporarily resigned from Nightfall.

In April, 2011, Nightfall Games returned to independent status while retaining Cubicle 7 as their publisher. In April, 2012, Nightfall Games announced that Romark Entertainment had acquired the film and television rights to SLA Industries and that a joint venture would produce comics, games and other media. Since March 2013 no updates have been made on this topic.

On 28 February 2018, Nightfall Games was incorporated in the UK. Directorship is Allsop, Earle and Rapson.
