= Qin: The Warring States =

French tabletop role-playing game

Qin: The Warring States is a role-playing game published by Cubicle 7 in 2007.

== Description ==
Qin: The Warring States is a wuxia role-playing game, set in China during the Warring States period.

== Publication history ==
Qin is a thematic wuxia game originally from French publisher 7ème Cercle, who also published the core rulebook, Qin: The Warring States (2006), in English. Cubicle 7 announced in late 2007 that they had licensed the Qin role-playing game line and would publish English translations as their fourth role-playing game line and their next license after Starblazer Adventures. Cubicle 7 began selling the core Qin book by 7ème right away, and over the next two years they would translate and publish English versions of the game's French supplements.

Qin was translated from the French publisher "Le Septième Cercle". The French Qin was published in 2005.

== Supplements ==
- Qin: The Warring States the core rulebook for the game
- Qin Screen a playing aid for the Games Master with useful tables for running the game all in one place
- Qin Legends rules for more experienced characters
- Qin Bestiary Details various fantastic creatures of myth which the players can interact with
- The Art of War includes rules for battles and details the armies of the various nations that make up the game setting

== Reception ==
Qin won the Silver ENnie Award for Best Game and Best Interior Art.

== Reviews ==
- Pyramid
