= Sláine: The Roleplaying Game of Celtic Heroes =

Tabletop role-playing game

Sláine: The Roleplaying Game of Celtic Heroes (Mongoose Publishing, original 2002 cover).

Sláine: The Roleplaying Game of Celtic Heroes is a fantasy role-playing game (RPG) designed by Ian Sturrock, and first published in 2002 by Mongoose Publishing. The game is currently out of print. It was derived from Sláine using the d20 System. The franchise was transferred to the Runequest rules system in 2007. The rules were meant to be convertible and much of the background information has been transferred verbatim, as has the format and borders of the pages.

== Publication history ==
Sláine, The Roleplaying Game of Celtic Heroes (2002), was the second role-playing game published by Mongoose Publishing, and like their first RPG The Judge Dredd Roleplaying Game it was both was a licensed property from the 2000AD comics and also used the d20 System. Sláine differed from other fantasy systems by introducing new concepts, including "enech" which was a system representing reputation and honor for characters. Mongoose managed to support all four of their d20 role-playing game lines quickly and constantly during the d20 boom, and as a result Sláine received 10 supplements (2002-2003). The d20 boom went into a bust beginning in 2003, with Mongoose ending the run of Sláine in that year.

Mongoose published a RuneQuest edition of Sláine (2007), but did not support that version well.

== Setting ==
The setting itself is closely based on the 2000 AD comic series Sláine, created by Pat Mills & Angie Kincaid, but is also drawn heavily from Celtic mythology. In Tir Nan Og, The Land of the Young, dwell the four tribes who worship Danu. They are a freedom-loving people and regard leadership a mere step away from totalitarianism. This freedom of course includes the right to fight, feast, and raid their neighbours. The four tribes are The Sessair, The Fir Domain, The Finians and the Falians. In their centre is Dinas Emrys the eternal fortress, the repository of druidic knowledge and the home of the ever-living ones.

On all their borders they are beset by troubles, south of them the Drune lords, whose religion is a perversion of their own, preach that death is the only end to suffering in this life, and that death should be brought to all as a blessing. To the west the berserkers dwell, who delight in raiding and violence as much as the Tribes of the Earth Goddess. To the north the fomorians live, sea-demons, strange chimerae of man and beast who eat the suffering of mortals and drink their tears. Beneath the earth, the El-Worlds consist of strange reflections of earth, where the gods themselves rule kingdoms.

== System ==
The system contains fewer races and classes than the basic D20 system, but contains interesting prestige classes and options for characters from each tribe, called character concepts. Magic is run on Earth Power points and spells are bought with skill points rather than being class-dependent. It also has variant rules for bending weapons, human sacrifice for earth power and other rules that match the setting tone.

== Playable races ==
- Dwarves: but more like the comical dwarves of folklore than the Tolkien image that now abounds
- Humans
- Warped Ones: humans with blood of the ancient beast folk whose bodies contain more Earth power than most.
- Sons Of Cymidu: Magical offspring of women of the Fir Domain. Gestated in six weeks, they are born fully armed and armoured.
- Formorians: Amphibian Demons from the northern land of Lochlann who feed on human emotions
- Cythrons: Ancient beings imprisoned in the earth, who are using the power generated by human suffering to escape
- Half-Cythrons: Rare cross breeds of cythrons & humans
- Avancs: Telepathic sentient apes, moon worshippers.
- Half-Titans: Strong but moronic cross-breeds with the old owners of the fir domain.
- Titan Dwarves: As the humans have dwarves, so the titans had theirs, the only race capable of imbuing items with magic powers.

== Classes ==
- Druid: Mages who stand outside the social classes, also taking the roles of advisors to the nobility and lawyers.
- Thief: A rogue style character with many skills
- Noble Warrior: A fighter style warrior with tribe based bonuses
- Tribal Warrior: A barbarian style warrior with tribe based bonuses
- Witch: Specialist in human sacrifice and summoning monsters

== List of books ==
Sláine: The Roleplaying Game of Celtic Heroes

Tir Nan Og

The four tribe sourcebooks

- The Sessair
- The Finians
- The Fir Domain
- The Falians

The Teeth of the Moon Sow & Horned God Campaign:

- The Invulnerable King
- Teeth Of the Moon Sow
- The Ragnarok Book
- Way of The Horned God

Four more sourcebooks for the borders of Tir Nan Og were planned but never released:

- Fomorians: The Sea Devils of Lochlann
- Norsemen: The Berserkers of Midgard
- The Drunes: Druids of the Worm God
- Dinas Emrys: The Eternal Fortress

== Reception ==
Sláine won the 2003 Silver Ennie Award for "Best d20 Game".

== Reviews ==
- Pyramid
