= Dragon in the Smoke =

Dragon in the Smoke is a 2003 role-playing game adventure published by Heresy Gaming for Victoriana.

== Plot summary ==
Dragon in the Smoke is an adventure in which the player characters are plunged into a cross‑society investigation to recover two missing children, unraveling a seemingly motive‑less crime whose only clues hint at an impossible dragon.

== Reviews ==
- Pyramid
- Fictional Reality (Issue 15 - Mar 2004)
- Legions Realm Monthly (Issue 17 - Feb 2004)
