= Starblazer =

British small-format comics anthology

- The early style of Starblazer cover with the single pane colour cover (issue 1, April, 1979)

Publication information
- Publisher: D. C. Thomson & Co. Ltd
- Schedule: Fortnightly
- Format: Ongoing series
- Genre: Science fiction
- Publication date: April 1979 – January 1991
- No. of issues: 281

Starblazer - Space Fiction Adventure in Pictures was a British small-format comics anthology in black and white published by D. C. Thomson & Co. Ltd.

== History ==
The comic book magazine was launched in response to the popularity of science fiction in the 1970s at the cinema and on television. A science fiction comic had first been considered by Ian Chisholm and Jack Smith, editors at DC Thomson, in 1976. A decision was made to launch the comic in September 1978. Smith was the first editor. His successors in the role were Bill Graham and Bill McLoughlin.

Starblazer reached 281 issues, running from April 1979, to 1 January 1991. The front cover was printed in colour while the back page featured an ongoing subject that was relevant to space. This included pictures of astronauts, brief details of the missions they were on, artificial satellites and the planets and planetoids of the Solar System. The first three issues were published monthly, changing to two issues a month from issue four until the last issue in 1991.

Partway through its run, from issue 168 onwards, the anthology changed format. Instead of a single front cover and a black and white subject on the back, a new all-colour 'wrap around' cover was instituted, most of the time showing a collage of subjects from that issue's storyline. The subject matters also appeared to have a more adult emphasis and there was a heavier focus on fantasy storylines. The cover title also changed format slightly to Starblazer - Fantasy Fiction in Pictures; despite the title change, there were still a considerable number of science fiction storylines up till the final issue.

The later style of Starblazer cover from Issue 200, which had a wrap around effect. Also showing an emphasis on fantasy storylines, this was the first appearance of the Kingdom of Anglerre.

Prior to the new format, there had been several issues that had been classed as interactive fiction, with the title Starblazer - Space (or Fantasy) roleplaying game in pictures similar in idea to the then popular Fighting Fantasy and Lone Wolf gamebooks, but this idea was quietly dropped after a few issues when it proved unpopular.

In May 2007 Cubicle 7 Entertainment announced that they were producing a licensed Starblazer role-playing game using the FATE 3.0 system. The game was released by Cubicle 7 in August 2008, at Gen Con Indianapolis, followed by a hard-cover edition in June 2009. In July 2009 it was nominated for three Ennies.

An exhibition was held in Dundee in 2009 to mark the 30th anniversary of the title and attracted comics creators like Alan Grant and Warren Ellis.

== Featured artists and writers ==
British comics creators to have worked on Starblazer include Grant Morrison, Walter Cyril Henry Reed, John Smith, Mike Chinn, Mike McMahon, Colin MacNeil, Cam Kennedy, John Radford and John Ridgway. There were also a number of European and South American artists who did other work in British comics, such as Enrique Alcatena. Also Mike Knowles. Before the comic was launched he was one of a group of writers selected by D. C. Thomson to come up with stories for the comic.

== Recurring characters ==
Although each issue was intended to be a 'one-off' storyline, a number of characters made reappearances in subsequent issues. The first of these was Matt Crane, who appeared in issue number 5, title "The Shipeater". He subsequently reappeared in issue 26, "Alien Contact".

Other recurring characters include:

Herne the Cosmic Outlaw. A mysterious warrior who is said to appear seemingly from nowhere to settle disputes in the 28th century. Herne was created by Grant Morrison.

- 15 – "Algol the Terrible"
- 86 – "The Cosmic Outlaw"

The Suicide Squad. Not to be confused with the DC Comics group of the same name, this series of stories, by W. C. H. Reed, follows the team of Lieutenant Steve Martin and his squad of misfits. Martin himself apparently was disgraced and his active military career was finished. The remainder of his crew, Gunner Gee, Vidop (Computer operator) Bello, and Navigator Henry also had issues. The first appearance was in issue 49, titled "Rigel Express". Steve Martin was called Steven Terry in that issue. The Terry surname was also used in a couple of early pages in issue 75 ("Doomrock") but it changed by the end of that issue. Later issues used the Martin surname and no explanation was ever given for the change. As the issues went on, Martin became increasingly sickened by war, especially the human cost. Issue number 31, "Starstrike", featured a character called Steve Martin, though he is not the same character.

- 49 – "Rigel Express"
- 75 – "Doomrock"
- 122 – "Alien Invasion"
- 154 – "The Suicide Squad"
- 162 – "The D Team"

The Planet Tamer. Formerly known as Jubal McKay, a member of the United Planets Security Service who was rebuilt by cyberneticist Dr. Hans Verringer. The whole side of his body was practically destroyed by a bomb that had been planted by a criminal by the name of Trent. The resulting damage left him effectively unable to live a normal life. Verringer rebuilt his body, integrating weapons and computer systems into his suit. Completely self-sufficient in space, he had a sled built at a ship engineers that he can control remotely. Armed with a wide variety of weapons the Planet Tamer operates outside the normal jurisdiction of the law.

- 40 – "Planet Tamer"
- 57 – "Galactic Lawman"
- 90 – "Return of the Planet Tamer"

Matt Tallis. One of the more irregular and short lived of the reused characters, Matt Tallis is an investigator/agent for the Galactic Security Service. He is stronger than the Earth normal, because his home world is a heavier gravity world. Tallis has his own ship, the Taurus, complete with a robot named Isak which can remotely control ship functions. Due to an implant that Tallis has, he can establish a telepathic style link with Isak.

- 42 – "The Immortals"
- 52 – "The Mask of Fear"
- 94 – "The Megaloi Menace"

Hadron Halley. A member of the Fi-Sci (Fighting Scientists), a part of Earths Galac Squad. The Fighting Scientists are a small group of scientists who are extremely intelligent, but also enter combat areas, having been fully trained in combat and survival techniques. Hadron Halley first appeared in issue number 50, "Moonsplitter", which also saw the first appearance of General Larz Pluto who would later become Halley's commanding officer and friend. Issue appearances are as follows.

- 50 – "Moonsplitter"
- 54 – "The Torturer of Triton II"
- 62 – "Terror Tomb"
- 77 – "Fortress of Fear"
- 81 – "The Serpents of Sirius"
- 109 – "The Sword of Solek"
- 121 – "Nightmare Ship"
- 130 – "Vassal's Revenge"
- 146 – "Knight of Darkness"
- 185 – "The Warlord of Laama"

Mikal R Kayn. A former police officer who was invalided out of the force after an explosion burned out his eyes. Without the aid of special glasses he can only see in the infrared spectrum. He eventually meets Cinnibar, a female warrior from the planet of Babalon, who helps him in a case to the abandoned research city of Valhalla Nova on the ice planet of Thrymheim. Kayns first appearance in issue 45 ("Operation Overkill") makes no mention of his accident, or his disability, only that he is a former law enforcement officer. However, it is the same character. Kayn was created by Grant Morrison.

- 45 – "Operation Overkill"
- 127 – "The Death Reaper"
- 167 – "Mind Bender"
- 173 – "The Vegas Murders"
- 177 – "The Midas Mystery"
- 199 – "Nether World"
- 203 – "Wipe Out"
- 207 – "Citizen Kayn"
- 211 – "The Dream Machine"
- 219 – "Till Death Do Us Part"
- 225 – "Supercop"
- 247 – "Kayn's Quest"
- 252 – "Head Case"
- 256 – "Convict Kayn"
- 258 – "Computer Killer"
- 266 – "Badlands"

Cinnibar. A fierce female warrior from the frontier planet of Babalon. Her character started in the Kayn stories, and she was also created by Morrison. She had three spin off stories involving herself and her brother Rulf who also had made his first appearance in a Kayn story. Cinnibar is a tall, statuesque, but slender woman who looks human. Her most distinctive features are the extremely long hair, and three striped marks on her face which could be tribal style tattoos. She favours combat with traditional style weapons like swords, although she is not averse to using ranged weapons like laser blasters. As Kayn once remarked, he remembered that "Babalonians had found methods to kill practically anything that moves". She has a cousin, Vivanna, who also became a semi-recurring character in two of the Cinnibar issues.

- 216 – "Trouble in Babalon"
- 253 – "Revolt on Babalon"
- 264 – "Banished From Babalon"

Grok and Zero. One of the earlier series with a lighter tone to it. While some of the stories themselves are serious in nature, they do have a touch of humour to them. Grok is a humanoid alien, an experienced Space Policeman. His partner is injured in the first appearance and he gets assigned a new partner by the name of Smith, who he dubs 'Zero' which is derived from his service number. In this universe, Earth is not the origin of the human race, it is in fact a planet called Cappella VI, Earth having been the location of a crash of a colony ship some centuries before, from which the present population has descended, although it has regressed somewhat.

- 176 – "Grok and Zero"
- 184 – "The Return of Grok and Zero"
- 217 – "The Pirates of Penz-Anz"
- 221 – "Beastworld"
- 244 – "Double Trouble"
- 278 – "Zero's Hour"

Frank Carter. More commonly referred to as just 'Carter', he is a mandroid: part robotic, but not quite enough to be called a cyborg. His background is revealed in a later issue. Frank Carter was a perfectly normal police officer until he received a gun blast to the head. The severe head wound meant that pioneering cybernetic surgery was tried. He was given enhanced strength and reactions, but the part of his brain that contained emotions had been destroyed. His basic no-nonsense attitude to lawbreakers, and some would say overly brutal methods are constantly bringing him into conflict with his superiors. This character was created by Mike Knowles.

- 179 – "Mandroid"
- 191 – "Carter's Law"
- 215 – "Carter and the Killer"
- 220 – "Time Warp"
- 228 – "The Secret of Ice Mountain"
- 237 – "Rough Justice"
- 239 – "Desolation City"
- 243 – "Death Run"
- 245 – "Rogue Mandroid"
- 260 – "Carter Breaks Loose"
- 265 – "The Termination"
- 272 – "Carter's Fury"
- 280 – "Carter and the Crazies"

Starhawk. An intergalactic freelance troubleshooter, his real name is Sol Rynn. He answers distress calls from those in need who use a special card which slots into a computer interface. Starhawk was one of the flagship stories in the short-lived DC Thomson comic The Crunch. Starhawk also made a number of brief appearances in DC Thomsons Hotspur annual. His companion is a robot simply named Droid. He has a starship that he can remotely summon. The setting is the crumbling Earth Empire which has been ravaged by years of raiding from the alien Krell. Strangely enough, little background is given to the Krell themselves and the backstory of conflict between the Krell and that of Earth is never elaborated on. The result is that much of the galaxy is in a state of lawlessness.

- 186 – "Starhawk"
- 201 – "Return of Starhawk"
- 222 – "Target...Starhawk"

Skald. The Skald series of stories initially is set in the region of a castle where the population are enslaved by powerful 'warlocks'. The warlocks use energy weapons to dispense their own brand of justice and keep the population enslaved by fear. When Skald, a young herder, finds out that he is to receive the 'collar of manhood', basically a life sentence in the mines performing hard labour, he rebels. Lashing out in anger, he kills one of the warlocks and flees the area. Later he meets with Linx, an Amazonian warrioress member of the matriarchal Yaba-Kel tribe. Many elements of the Skald stories centre around the fact that an Earth colony ship crash landed on the planet and advanced technology found its way into the hands of a select few people, and the constant struggle for this technology.

- 190 – "The Power of the Warlocks"
- 241 – "Revenge of the Warlocks"
- 267 – "Skald-The Saga Continues"
- 274 – "Skald-The Ultimate Conflict"

The Anglerre Series. This series of issues, set in the fantasy kingdom of Anglerre, follows the royal family and their conflict against various aggressors. The first appearance of Prince Veyne, in issue 200, was followed by a later issue which was a prequel showing Veyne's father, King Iagon. King Iagon had been vaguely referred to in #200, both by saying that Veyne had just ascended to the throne on the death of his father, and a ship named the 'Royal Iagon'. Much of the storyline of the Royal House of Anglerre is entwined with the god Vishena and the Demon Sword, Cerastes, who will make its user invincible, but will also kill its wielder after an unspecified period of time. The nature of Anglerre's opponents seems to make heavy use of Demons. A recurring character within this series is that of Myrdan, a seemingly immortal figure of unspecified power. In the issue Demon Sword, Myrdan at one point seems to merge with Vishena, which hints that he could be an avatar of the god.

- 200 – "Demon Sword"
- 224 – "Rune"
- 231 – "Godstone"
- 250 – "Sun Prince"
- 271 – "The Triune Warrior"

Solo. This series charts the adventures of Solo, the sole human survivor of a cryogenic sleeper ship. The charter of his vessel, the Telurian Quest, grants him ownership of a planet. However, he finds that his planet is already inhabited as faster than light capable ships were launched some years after the Telurian ships. Solo was reared by an onboard android who educated him with tales of chivalry. Therefore, Solo has a rather archaic way of looking at things and is also naive.

- 202 – "Lord of the Far Planet"
- 229 – "Solo's Quest"

The Robot Kid. One of the more humorous series of stories appeared in Starblazer. The initial Robot Kid story was set on a frontier planet under attack from bandits. The whole story had a quasi-western feel to it. The initial story had the townsfolk try to buy a Kelso Deathmek, a war robot, to protect them. What they got was a reprogrammed cinema usher. It is computerised mind had been loaded with all sorts of clichés and popular saying from Western films. Indeed, there were homages throughout the issue with a character by the name of Angel Eyes, and another character who bore a resemblance to Lee Van Cleef in the film The Good, the Bad and the Ugly. With its body destroyed at the end of the story, the replacement body was manufactured by the Japanese arm of the company and was a parody of the many martial arts movies. The third and final appearance was a parody of the Rambo-style movies.

- 204 – "The Robot Kid"
- 232 – "The Return of the Robot Kid"
- 273 – "The Robot Kid Strikes Back"

== Roleplaying game ==
Cubicle 7 released a licensed tabletop role-playing game called Starblazer Adventures using the Fate system in 2008, with supplements coming out through to 2013. It was shortlisted for awards both at the Indie RPG Awards and the ENnies. Followup games included Legends of Anglerre, which concentrated on the fantasy elements of the later issues.

== Sources ==
- Starblazer at the Grand Comics Database
- Starblazer at the Comic Book DB (archived from the original)
