= Fey Magic: Dreaming the Reverie =

Fey Magic: Dreaming the Reverie is a 2002 role-playing game supplement for d20 System games published by Mongoose Publishing.

== Contents ==
Fey Magic: Dreaming the Reverie is a supplement in which the fey, enigmatic beings whose nature and magic—ranging from gentle whimsy to terrifying power, are explored as fiercely guarded mysteries known only through the whispered name of their source, the Reverie.

== Reviews ==
- Pyramid
- Asgard #7 (Sept., 2002)
