= Doctor Who: The Card Game =

Doctor Who: The Card Game is a card game based on the TV series Doctor Who. It was designed by Martin Wallace and published by Cubicle 7 in October 2012.

== Development and release ==
The team from Cubicle 7 at the UK Games Expo and Origins Game Fair showed off their new game in 2012, created by designer Martin Wallace, which shipped in August 2012.

In 2014 Cubicle 7 announced that they would be releasing a second edition of the card game with new cards and a 2-player variant.

== Game Play ==
In Doctor Who: The Card Game each player takes on the role of the Doctor and his companions in defending locations across time and space from a variety of enemies and they also play the role of the forces of evil by sending enemies to invade the locations belonging to other players.

The number of actions you can perform in your turn varies depending on how many cards you are able to play, as you must always end your turn by passing three cards to the player to your right. Play continues in this manner until the end of the game.

== Reception ==
Diary of the Doctor Who Role-Playing Games reviewed Doctor Who—The Card Game and said that "In our playtests, the game was fun, engaging and filled with discussions and numerous finger-pointing moments as the strategy of the game unfolded. The biggest weakness is that when certain cards are played, it is nearly impossible to gather enough other cards to counter the stronger card. None the less the game is enjoyable, but not quite as dynamic and personal as the role-playing game itself. A worthwhile and amusing diversion."

Doctor Who Magazine wrote that "Doctor Who: The Card Game is a more competitive affair, with cards representing Defenders (recent Doctors and their companions), Enemies (including Daleks, Cybermen and Weeping Angels), Locations (such as Akhaten and Torchwood Tower) and various Support cards. Our favourite among these is the Jammie Dodger, which automatically defeats an attack."

Matt Goddard from Game Rant listed it among the best Doctor Who board and card games In 2024, reviewing the second edition and said that "Fans of the modern era will want to pick up the second edition of the game that expands to include the Tenth, Eleventh, and Twelfth Doctors and their favorite companions."

== Awards ==
Doctor Who: The Card Game won an Origins Award for Best Card Game in 2013.
