= Alex Fennell =

Game designer

- Occupation: Game designer

Alexander Fennell is a British publisher who has worked primarily on role-playing games.

== Career ==
Alex Fennell was a Captain in the British army. When he was leaving the army in late 2000 and thinking what career path to take, Fennell met Matthew Sprange in a Swindon, England pub, and Sprange offered to start a game company with him. Fennell was uncertain about this suggestion and instead went to work for a 3G mobile communication company. After six months of working in that field, Fennell had become interested in having a job allowing more creativity, and when Sprange contacted him again about forming the game company Mongoose Publishing to publish adventures using the d20 license from Wizards of the Coast, Fennell agreed and joined him. Thanks to good sales on their first product, The Slayer's Guide to Hobgoblins (2001), Fennell left his day job and became the first employee of Mongoose Publishing with Sprange joining as an employee a month later. Fennell used his saved army wages to make certain the company was able pay to publish a book per month, until they began to receive payments back from their distributors. Fennell left Mongoose in 2009.
