= Starship Troopers: The Roleplaying Game =

Tabletop role-playing game

Starship Troopers:
The Roleplaying Game
- Starship Troopers (role-playing game) cover art.
- Designers: August Hahn
- Publishers: Mongoose Publishing
- Publication: 2005; 2006 (pocket edition)
- Genres: Sci-fi
- Systems: d20 System

Starship Troopers: The Roleplaying Game is a tabletop role-playing game produced by Mongoose Publishing in 2005. The game is based upon the 1959 book Starship Troopers by Robert A. Heinlein, but it is mostly based on its adaptations, Starship Troopers (1997) and Starship Troopers 2 (2004), and the cartoon series (Roughnecks: Starship Troopers Chronicles); the game itself was published under license of Sony Pictures. While it is impossible to seamlessly merge all three different interpretations, this RPG does not pick one over the other, instead merging the three as best it could.

There are two editions of the game; the original hardcover book, published in 2005; and a softcover pocket edition, published in 2006.

== Published supplements ==
Mongoose Publishing has released the following supplements:

- Starship Troopers RPG (2005)
- Starship Troopers RPG Pocket Edition (2006)
- Blaze of Glory 1: Alamo Bay (more novel than RPG supplement)
- Starship Troopers Floorplans
- The Selvache Incident
- Boot Camp
- The United Citizens' Federation
- The Arachnid Empire
- Mobile Infantry Field Manual
- Ambush at Altair

== Mobile Infantry ==
In Starship Troopers: The Roleplaying Game, players play as units from the Mobile Infantry (though the ability to play as a Skinny is granted).

=== Mobile Infantry classes ===
- Mobile Infantry Trooper
- Chaplain
- Comms Trooper
- Engineer
- Field Medic
- Hero of the Federation/Veteran
- Light Armour Trooper
- Marauder Driver
- Neodog Handler
- Officer Cadet
- Pathfinder
- Sniper

=== Other classes ===
There are other classes in the game that players can play if they choose not to be in the Mobile Infantry.

- Special Services Agent
- Telepath
- Memory Man
- Lucky Man
- Civilian
- Fleet Officer
- Skinny Raider

=== Mobile Infantry equipment and weapons ===
The weapons and equipment available in the game originate mainly from the movies, TV series, and the novel. Some original equipment unique to the game was also added.

== Aliens ==
In Starship Troopers: The Roleplaying Game, the players fight against the Arachnids and the Skinnies. The Arachnids include the warriors depicted in the novel as well as the diverse subspecies portrayed in the films and TV series. The Skinnies are primarily based on their depiction in the Roughnecks TV series, and are a playable race.

== Second edition ==
The Starship Troopers Role-Playing Game was in the process of being redone using the rule set from the Traveller Role-Playing Game. It would have featured all previously revealed races plus several new ones (Terrans, Arachnids, Skinnies, the Forth, and the Coven). However Mongoose has since lost the license to Starship Troopers; as such, the game will not be re-released under the new rule set as originally planned.

== See also ==
- Bug (Starship Troopers)
