= The Quintessential Fighter =

The Quintessential Fighter is a 2001 role-playing game supplement published by Mongoose Publishing for the D20 System.

== Contents ==
The Quintessential Fighter is a supplement in which new options are presented for the fighter class.

== Publication history ==
Shannon Appelcline explained how the class and race guides in "The Complete Handbooks" line published by TSR were memorable and "They had been a constant presence at gaming tables throughout the 1990s but no one had though to create something similar 3e. Calling the books 'quintessential', Mongoose began their own 'complete' series with The Quintessential Fighter (2002)."

== Reviews ==
- Envoyer
- Backstab
- RPGNow Downloader Monthly (Issue 5 - Apr 2003)
- Coleção Dragão Brasil
- Fictional Reality Magazine
