= Tim Dedopulos =

British writer and game designer

Tim Dedopulos is a British-born writer, game designer and editor. His published material covers a wide range of areas—novels, short-stories, game supplements/strategy guides, direct mail self-help booklets, light popular culture books, and more serious non-fiction works on a variety of subjects.

== Early life ==
Dedopulos was born in Winchester, Hampshire, England. He is of England and Greek heritage.

== Career ==
Dedopulos writes professionally, often in conjunction with more traditional editorial day jobs. Early in 1995, he joined the Glasgow office of Seattle games giant Wizards of the Coast to work on their dystopian future-horror game SLA Industries. The game line was dropped just before Christmas that same year, and after a period of freelance work, he moved to London publisher Carlton Books, where he worked as the executive editor.

In 1998, Wizards of the Coast gave all rights to SLA Industries back to the original creator, Dave Allsop. Allsop and original SLA designer and co-writer Jared Earle invited Dedopulos to join them in reforming the original company that had produced the game, Nightfall Games. Dedopulos worked as de facto managing editor of Nightfall until the company's publishing partner, Hogshead Publishing, closed its operations in 2003. He has been writing and freelancing since then.

In 2011 he devised The Great Global Treasure Hunt on Google Earth, a book and online based treasure hunt that uses complicated clues in the associated book, online social media and Google Earth to find a hidden treasure.

== Selected bibliography ==
Dedopulos's publication history includes more than 100 works as of 2016, with almost 200 more as editor. A selection is given below.

=== Fiction ===
- Elmwood (in Cthulhu Lives!, 2014, Ghostwoods Books)
- Red Phone Box (Contributing Author, 2013, Ghostwoods Books)
- The Doll Factory (in Tales of Promethea, 2012, Cubicle Seven)
- Puppet Masters: Brujah Novel 3 (2003, White Wolf)
- The Overseer: Brujah Novel 2 (2003, White Wolf)
- Slave Trade: Brujah Novel 1 (2002, White Wolf)
- Glass Walkers (2002, White Wolf)
- Apocrypha (1999, White Wolf)

=== Non-fiction ===
- Mensa Logic Tests (2016, Carlton Books)
- Whodunit Mysteries (2016, Arcturus Books)
- The Biggest Pub Joke Book... Ever (2016, Carlton Books)
- Einstein's Puzzle Universe (2016, Carlton Books)
- The Middle Earth Puzzle Collection (2015, Carlton Books)
- Whodunits (2015, Arcturus Books)
- A Game of Thrones Puzzle Quest (2014, Carlton Books)
- Dante's Infernal Puzzle Collection (2013, Carlton Books)
- Tutankhamun's Book of Puzzles (2012, Carlton Books)
- The Great Global Treasure Hunt on Google Earth (2011, Carlton Books)
- The Sherlock Holmes Puzzle Collection (2011, Carlton Books)
- Killer Crosswords (2010, Carlton Books)
- The Greatest Puzzles Ever Solved (2009, Carlton Books)
- Ultimate Logic Puzzles (2007, Carlton Books)
- Symbolism (as Tim Kenner, 2006, Carlton Books)
- The Brotherhood (2005, Carlton Books)
- The Book of Witches (2005, Carlton Books)
- Kabbalah (2004, Carlton Books)
- The Book of Wizards (2002, Carlton Books)
- Kick It: The Radiskull & Devil Doll Phenomenon (2001, Carlton Books)
- Excel 2000 Made Painless (2000, Carlton Books)
- The Encyclopaedia of Fantasy (Contributing Author, 1998–2002, Carlton Books)
- The Best Pub Joke Book Ever! Volume 2 (1998, Carlton Books)
- The Best Book of Insults and Put-Downs Ever! (1998, Carlton Books)
- The Official Magic: The Gathering Deckbuilders' Guide (1997, Carlton Books)
- The Tao of Revitalisation (1996, De Swartes)
- The Self-Hypnosis Handbook (1995, De Swartes)
- The Encyclopedia of Sex (1995, De Swartes)
- Management & Relief of Arthritis (1994, De Swartes)
- Irritable Bowel Syndrome (1993, De Swartes)

=== Role-playing game books ===
- Unknown Armies 3rd Edition Book 1: Play (Contributing Author, 2016, Atlas)
- Unknown Armies 3rd Edition Book 2: Run (Contributing Author, 2016, Atlas)
- Unknown Armies 3rd Edition Book 3: Reveal (Contributing Author, 2016, Atlas)
- Orpheus: Crusade of Ashes (Contributing Author, 2003, White Wolf)
- Orpheus: Shadow Games (Contributing Author, 2003, White Wolf)
- EverQuest DM Guide (Contributing Author, 2002, White Wolf)
- Hush Hush (Contributing Author, 2001, Atlas)
- Hunter Book Hermits (Contributing Author, 2001, White Wolf)
- Hunter Book Visionaries (Contributing Author, 2001, White Wolf)
- Hunter Book Redeemers (Contributing Author, 2001, White Wolf)
- Hunter The Reckoning: Storyteller's Guide, (Contributing Author, 2001, White Wolf)
- Hunter The Reckoning: Players' Guide (Contributing Author, 2000, White Wolf)
- SLA Industries Hogshead Edition (Contributing Author, 2000, Nightfall)
- Elevator to the Netherworld (Contributing Author, 2000, Atlas)
- Statosphere (Contributing Author, 2000, Atlas)
- Golden Comeback (Contributing Author, 2000, Atlas)
- The Contract Directory (Contributing Author, 1999–2001, Nightfall)
- Post-Modern Magick (Contributing Author, 1999, Atlas)
- OneShots (Contributing Author, 1999, Atlas)
