= Mort Sourcebook =

Tabletop role-playing game supplement

Mort Sourcebook is a 1995 role-playing game supplement for SLA Industries published by Wizards of the Coast.

== Contents ==
Mort Sourcebook is a supplement which details the city of Mort which holds the headquarters of SLA Industries, and some of the contracts (BPNs) found in the city intended for most Operative squads.

== Reception ==
Andy Butcher reviewed Mort Sourcebook for Arcane magazine, rating it a 6 out of 10 overall. Butcher comments that "As a guide to Mort itself [...] the Mort Sourcebook is somewhat less than impressive. It will, however, prove very useful to almost any SLA referee, both in terms of inspiration and actual usable information. You just can't help thinking that much of this should have been in the basic rules, leaving more space here for the city..."

The Mort Sourcebook was banned at Gen Con under TSR because of an image on the back cover that was purported to depict genitalia.
