= Noctum =

Tabletop horror role-playing game

- Noctum 3rd edition cover
- Designers: Mischa L Thomas
- Publishers: Wicked World Games 1.1 until May 2008; Mongoose Publishing from May 2008
- Publication: October 2005 (1st Edition); January 2007 (2nd Edition); May 2009 (3rd Edition); August 2015 (4th Edition)
- Genres: Survival Horror; Neo-noir
- Systems: Custom

Noctum is a pen and paper survival horror role-playing game developed by Mischa L Thomas. There were two earlier Swedish editions published by Wicked World Games 1.1. The third edition was published by Mongoose Publishing under their Flaming Cobra imprint.

== Game universe ==
Noctum is set in modern times. The players take on the roles of everyday people—although some are more engrossed in the hidden world from the start. Each character has one or more weakness (Insane Heritage, Marked, Crossover, etc.) that has formed his life in one way or another. The horrors of the game often centre on the state of our society and the crimes and atrocities that humans subject each other to. Rape, murder, starvation, religious zealotry turned deadly and drug abuse are a few of the occurrences that give rise to dark manifestations and incarnations. Most people are apathetic, and look the other way as these things pass them by. An unknown outer force uses the greed and sadism of mankind to its own end. It lies in the layered dimensions beyond the world we normally view as reality.

== System ==
Noctum uses 2D10s when calling for dice rolls. In many cases an automatic success mechanic is employed, often when dealing with investigative scenes. The system shifts when handling ritual magic and psychic abilities, using cards instead of dice.

Combat can be dealt with using one of two modes, Suspense Mode or Duke Mode. The Duke Mode is usually used when running a game with a high level of combat and action; while stories with a different focus typically use the Suspense Mode. The damage system is extremely deadly and gritty: A well-placed bullet or a single stab wound can be enough to kill or severely injure a human character.

As with most RPGs focusing on horror, Noctum has a system that deals with mental instability and mental disorders. Beyond this, each player can use the EKG strip to keep track of his or her character's adrenaline levels, changed stats, and Fight or Flight reaction.

== Styles of play ==
This is entirely up to the gamers and there are probably dozens of different possible styles. However, Noctum comes with some background on nine classic styles. The main myth never changes, only the part of it that the characters are exposed to during play.

=== Ancient Gate ===
The myth of the game is filtered through ancient religions and belief systems focusing on banished malevolent creatures which want to re-enter our world. Research and investigations (often revolving around the academic world) are common elements. Violence plays a small part, if any. Hindering crazed sects from calling their dark masters into our world is a typical concept.

=== Hack & Slash ===
This is almost a mode of play. The focus is violence and the stories are driven forward by high-octane action. By using the Duke Mode the action is kept quick and dirty. Here the actual killing of antagonists by different methods is the main thing.

=== Legions of Hell ===
This style is often played with an even mix of action, research and investigation. The game universe is viewed through the lens of Biblical scripture and Judeo-Christian-Islamic mythology. Possessions, entities that display demonic features (strengths/limitations), and prophecies are common elements.

=== Morose Miroir ===
Atrocities incarnate and dark desires manifested are the bread and butter of Morose Miroir. Here our world overlaps with nightmarish dimensions that in most cases are the result of a terrible crime, sin or other similarly horrific occurrence. Driven to the brink of insanity by the shifts in reality the character has to solve puzzles and find answers in order to survive. Violence plays its part, but the horror is often on a pure psychological level.

=== Paranormal ===
There is seldom confirmation of the otherworldly. In this style one is subjected to the ravages of the paranormal/occult world but is often left without proof. Shattering conspiracies, avoiding shady agencies, and finding the truth is pivotal. Violence and investigation often have an equal part to play.

=== Thriller ===
Here there are seldom any encounters with the otherworldly. Instead the antagonists are very human: in Thriller style, players concentrate on profiling and hunting brutal and sadistic serial offenders. Profilers descend into madness as they try to get inside the head of the killer they’re chasing. Psychological pressure, mental anguish, and being the obsession of a psychotic killer with a plan is part of the deal.

=== Urban Fantasy ===
Most characters have the ability to use ritual magic or psychic abilities. In Urban Fantasy the otherworldly is something that is a bit more common to the characters. They use supernatural abilities to fight off organizations and entities in the dark back-alleys of the city. The hidden world waits just around the corner.

=== Wicked City ===
The characters are immersed in a violent cold world of jaded hitmen and killers. This style is very much inspired by the "Neo Noir" frame of mind. The supernatural is seldom seen, but it can be hinted at. There are rumors that speak of entire mob crews turning up ripped to shreds, with signs of shooting in every direction without hitting a thing. Corruption, brutality, and greed are important elements. Violence is also something that can play a big part.

=== Virus ===
Virus centres on genetic experimentation and viral weaponry gone haywire. Large, unethical, and greedy corporations and clandestine agencies conduct their unlawful experiments in their hidden laboratories. Violent viral outbreaks, mutations, and genetically altered monstrosities are the focus. In many cases there is both an air of psychological suspense, research, and hardcore violence thrown in the mix. There is seldom any form of supernatural explanation as such; everything that happens can be explained through cutting edge science.

== Antagonists ==
The game has a wide range of antagonists, everything from serial killers to ancient dark demigods. The most common type is the so-called Half-Breed. Most are manifestations of atrocities and horrible crimes.

=== Half Blood ===
==== Chainer ====
Chainer

Depraved sexual crimes sometimes give rise to different creatures that are manifestations of the pain, death and degradation of the victim. Chainers are the result of those who have been killed in the snuff film industry. After returning to the world of the living they’re given a loathsome body that is an incarnation of death, pleasure and pain. They often hunt for victims in the red-light districts. Upon acquiring a victim they subject them to inhuman torture and sexual abuse, killing them in the end.

==== Flesh Doll ====
Flesh Doll

The media image of beauty has left many men and women broken. Some become anorexic or bulimic, while others go under the knife in search of the perfect look. Flesh Dolls are the incarnation of those who suffer from cosmetic surgery addiction and have died as a result of it. As one of the many Noctum universe creatures the Flesh Dolls stalk our world with a twisted sense of vengeance and a depraved need. Their flesh constantly decomposes and falls off, and in order to keep themselves “beautiful” they hunt and kill young women/men, whom they flay. They then staple the skin onto themselves. If given the opportunity they attack plastic surgeons, torturing them to death through sadistic medical procedures as they blame them for their condition.

==== Forsaken ====
Forsaken

The Forsaken are the souls of children who have died at the hands of their abusers. After they die their souls are hurled through dark realms and infused with negative energy of twisted vengeance. This gives their soul a physical form and as perverted creatures and they return to the world of the living, looking pale and broken. They have a distorted sense of things and exact their revenge on parents and children alike who have a good life, which the Forsaken never had when still living. Their small size and childish looks are deceptive as they’re extremely resilient to damage and have an array of abilities which makes them much more dangerous than any human.

== Influences ==
Noctum has been inspired by many different sources within the horror genre. The use of dimensional shifts and dark worlds created by atrocities, twisted desires, nightmares, and madness is a common horror concept seen in Silent Hill, Darkness, Hellraiser, and A Nightmare on Elm Street.

Possessions, entities capable of body jumping, and curses which can take over a person and twist a location into a deadly maze are other dangers which the characters can encounter. The Amityville Horror, The Exorcist, House on Haunted Hill and 1408 are movies that use this concept. There are also aspects which are seen in The Thing, Resident Evil, and similar games and movies where an entity or pathogen mutates, changes or replaces individuals, causing violent outbreaks.

== Material ==
- Noctum Core Book 3rd edition (May 2009)
- Vivisection (June 2009)
