= EN World =

Tabletop RPG news site and forum

Morrus' Unofficial Tabletop RPG News
- Website type: Gaming
- Owner: EN Publishing Ltd.
- Creator: Russ Morrissey
- Website: enworld.org
- Commercial: Yes
- Registration: Optional (required for posting on the forums)
- Launched: January 1, 2001
- Current status: Active

EN World, also known as Morrus' Unofficial Tabletop RPG News, is a British-owned tabletop role-playing game news and reviews website. The website is run and owned by Russ Morrissey ("Morrus"). It reports current news and provides insight into major product releases before they are officially unveiled. EN World was the original host of the ENNIE Awards.

The site's forums are a gathering place for over a quarter-million gamers. In addition to discussing games, members also participate in play-by-post games on the EN World message boards.

== ENnies ==
Beginning in 2002, EN World hosted the ENnies in association with the Gen Con gaming convention. The ENnies is an award show recognizing the best role-playing game products and publishers for the preceding year. The ENnies were officially known as the "Gen Con EN World RPG Awards" from 2002 to 2019. As of 2017, the awards are run by business manager Stacey Muth. In 2019, EN World owner Russ Morrissey retired from the awards, which were officially renamed "The ENnies".

== EN Publishing ==
EN Publishing was established in 2001 and is the publishing arm of EN World. It has published over 300 books, including the role-playing game systemWhat's O.L.D. is N.E.W. (WOIN), EN5ider magazine, and the official Judge Dredd (role-playing game). In 2016 Angus Abranson joined EN Publishing as business director. Abranson left in 2019 and was replaced by Jessica Hancock, while Marc Langworthy joined as 2000 AD line manager.

In October 2000, the company announced the Awfully Cheerful Engine, a comic-book-inspired tabletop game.

== Level Up: Advanced 5th Edition ==
In August 2020, EN Publishing announced a project code-named Level Up, an advanced adaptation of Dungeons & Dragons 5th Edition. The game was published in 2021. Kotaku.com listed Level Up in its 10 Best Tabletop Roleplaying Books of 2022, and Polygon featured it in the same year. Screen Rant suggested that Level Up could be D&D 5e's Pathfinder.

Level Up is supported by a free online tools platform which contains all of the rules of the game, and a monthly magazine called the Gate Pass Gazette.

In 2022, following Wizards of the Coast proposing the termination of the Open Game License the A5E System Reference Document was released, enabling third party publishers to create and sell their own content for the Level Up game system.

A Starter Box was released for the game system in 2023.

== History ==
EN World was founded in 2000. It grew from the earlier "Eric Noah's Unofficial D&D 3rd Edition News" site, which was active from 1999 to 2001 and was the primary source of information about the third edition of the Dungeons & Dragons role-playing game before its release by Wizards of the Coast.

In 2005, the EN World GameStore was launched as a platform for selling downloadable RPG products. The GameStore allowed sellers to use their profits to purchase other products or transfer the money to PayPal. Buyers could transfer funds from PayPal or a similar service to purchase any non-free product. However, the GameStore was sold to DriveThruRPG in 2006.

EN World began experimenting with media content in 2012, starting with a six-episode animated show 'The Perturbed Dragon', video coverage of DragonMeet and the Battle of the Bards music competition.

In 2018, the site launched its official podcast, "Morrus' Unofficial Tabletop RPG Talk," a weekly program that provides insight into tabletop role-playing game news.
