= Armageddon: 2089 =

Tabletop role-playing game

Armageddon: 2089 is a role-playing game published by Mongoose Publishing in 2003.

== Description ==
Armageddon: 2089 is a d20 System game set in a future world with giant mechs.

== Publication history ==
Armageddon: 2089 was published by Mongoose Publishing in 2003.

== Reviews ==
- Backstab #45
