= Shadows over Scotland =

Tabletop horror role-playing game supplement

Cthulhu Britannica
Shadows over Scotland
- Designers: Stuart Boon
- Publishers: Cubicle 7 Entertainment
- Publication: 2011; 15 years ago
- Genres: Horror
- Systems: Basic Role-Playing
- ISBN: 978-0-85744-046-4

Shadows over Scotland is a 2011 role-playing game supplement published by Cubicle 7 Entertainment for Call of Cthulhu.

== Contents ==
Shadows over Scotland is a supplement which provides information on role-playing in Scotland, including six adventures and additional handouts.

== Reception ==
In a review of Shadows over Scotland in Black Gate, John ONeill said "Shadows Over Scotland is a marvelous product — well written, nicely researched, and attractively designed, with splendid spot art throughout."

Shadows over Scotland won the 2011 Origins Award for Best Roleplaying Supplement or Adventure.

Shadows over Scotland won the 2012 Gold ENnie Award for Best Setting.
