= Conquest of Nerath =

Board game

Conquest of Nerath is a Dungeons & Dragons themed war board game published by Wizards of the Coast in 2011.

== Overview ==
The board game Conquest of Nerath is a lightweight war game similar to Nexus Ops, and Axis and Allies, but with a fantasy theme.

== Gameplay ==
Gameplay begins with the players controlling preset territories and armies, which is delineated on the board. Players take turns battling their army's opponents with the goal of achieving victory. To end the game one player must either conquer all enemy capital cities, which is unusual, or collect victory points which accumulate through the acquisition of territory and treasure.

== Contents ==
Conquest of Nerath includes a rulebook, dice, a game board, 110 cards, and 252 plastic pieces used to depict the heroes and armies from Nerath, Karkoth, the Iron Circle, and Vailin.

== Reception ==
Conquest of Nerath won the Origins Award for Best Board Game of 2011.

According to Ben Kuchera of Penny Arcade, Conquest of Nerath "looks at war from a macro perspective". David M. Ewalt of Forbes comments: "The Dungeons & Dragons world serves as setting for a fantasy-flavored strategy wargame. Board game geeks will recognize it as a rebranded Axis and Allies, but with some fun changes, including game-changing "event" cards and dungeons you explore for powerful treasures. Addictive, detailed, and well-constructed: Not cheap, but epic!" Scott Taylor of Black Gate commented: "Filling this box is a world of depth, Wizards having spared no expense in its creation as each nation possesses individual pieces on the battlefield and includes not only land, but naval, and air units that can be deployed against an enemy".

Wired.com commented that "Conquest of Nerath is a great game and definitely worth adding to your collection".

In a review of Conquest of Nerath in Black Gate, John ONeill said: "Yes, the dungeon-delving aspect of Conquest of Nerath is fairly simplistic (none of these dungeons has a map, for example) and in truth the names are really just so much window dressing. But Conquest, like D&D itself, is still a game of imagination — and there's a thrill of fear when you send your heroes into the Tomb of Horror for the first time, trust me".
