= The Red Star Campaign Setting =

Role-playing tabletop game supplement

The Red Star Campaign Setting is a 2004 role-playing game supplement published by Green Ronin Publishing.

== Contents ==
The Red Star Campaign Setting is a supplement in which an adaptation of The Red Star comic's fusion of Soviet‑inspired myth, sorcery, and military sci‑fi into a full world, offers new classes, magic systems, equipment, vehicles, setting history, and stats for major characters so players can join the revolutionary struggle against Imbohl's tyrannical regime.

== Reviews ==
- Pyramid
- Backstab (Issue 18 - Dec 2004)
