= Lone Wolf Multiplayer Game Book =

Role-playing game supplement

Lone Wolf Multiplayer Game Book is a role-playing game published by Mongoose Publishing in 2010.

== Description ==
Lone Wolf Multiplayer Game Book is based on the Lone Wolf series of gamebooks.

== Publication history ==
Shannon Appelcline commented that after licensing Joe Dever's Lone Wolf series, Mongoose Publishing initially started production on Lone Wolf: The Roleplaying Game strongly but slowed down after a few years, and that "Despite this slowdown, Mongoose was also trying to expand the property with Matthew Sprange's Lone Wolf Multiplayer Gamebook (2010) — which allowed group roleplaying in the Magnamund setting. Lone Wolf Multiplayer was well-supported with supplements (2010-2012) that detailed the setting of Magnamund for the first time since the brief Magnamund Companion (1986). However, these RPG supplements also largely disappeared in 2012." Appelcline went on to explain what happened after that: "By the start of 2013, no new Lone Wolf or Lone Wolf Multiplayer books had been published in about a year. Sprange acknowledged that the line had two major problems: it was very expensive to keep the whole series in print; and the gamebooks had very narrow profit margins. Though Mongoose wanted to continue with the series, Dever reclaimed the rights."
