= The Judge Dredd Roleplaying Game =

Tabletop science fiction role-playing game

- Cover of 2002 Rulebook
- Designers: Matthew Sprange
- Publishers: Mongoose Publishing
- Publication: 2002 D20 rules edition; 2009 Traveller rules edition
- Genres: Science fiction
- Systems: d20 System, Mongoose Traveller
- ISBN: 1903980313

The Judge Dredd Roleplaying Game is a science fiction role-playing game published by Mongoose Publishing in 2002 and 2009. It is based on Judge Dredd from 2000 AD comic.

== Publication history ==
In 2002, Mongoose Publishing having acquired the rights to publish games set in the worlds created by 2000AD, released The Judge Dredd Roleplaying Game. Based on the d20 System, they published a total of 15 supplements. It was also supported by their in-house magazine, Signs & Portents.

In 2009, Mongoose released a new edition, using their Traveller rules set. It was announced that their license was ending in late 2016.

== Reception ==
In a review of The Judge Dredd Roleplaying Game in Black Gate, Robert Rowe said "Overall, if you like Judge Dredd and don't absolutely hate the Traveller rules system, this is an excellent game packed with key information and well-laid out stats, all bound together in a very slick package."

== Reviews ==
- Pyramid
- Backstab #40
