= Victoriana (role-playing game) =

Victoriana is a role-playing game published by Heresy Games in 2003, with second and third editions by Cubicle 7 in 2009 and 2013.

== Description ==
Victoriana is a game of roleplay in a fantasy alternative Victorian era.

== Publication history ==
John Tuckey, Scott Rhymer and Richard Nunn designed the role-playing game Victoriana (2003) utilizing the Fuzion system, and the game was released by British small-press publisher Heresy Games. The game was set in an alternate-history fantasy steampunk version of 1867. In 2006, Cubicle 7 acquired Heresy Games, and enlisted designer Ian Sturrock along with newly assigned Line Editor Andrew Peregrine to develop a revised edition of Victoriana. Sturrock and Peregrine replaced the Fuzion system with their proprietary Heresy Gaming System, which was a streamlined dice pool mechanic that incorporated both positive and negative dice, and was designed for simplicity and to remain unobtrusive. Cubicle 7 previewed the system in 2007, and received advance copies of Victoriana Second Edition (2009) barely in time for GenCon 2008, but the full print run was not released until mid-2009.

A third edition was published in 2013, again by Cubicle 7. This edition was designed to be compatible with the previous version of the game.

== Supplements ==
- Streets of Shadow is a six adventure campaign published in 2013 for the third edition of the game.
- Liber Magica is a supplement covering the use of magic in the game, greatly expanding on the rules in the core rulebook. Published in 2014 (third edition).
- The Concert in Flames is a guide to Europe in the Victoriana game and includes a five-part scenario. Published in 2015 (third edition).
- Marvels of Science and Steampunk is a sourcebook featuring new technological marvels for the game and rules on how to use them (second edition).
- Falkner's Millinery and Miscellanea is a guide for equipment and supplies for use in the game in the style of a catalogue (second edition).
- The Havering Adventures is a series of three adventures featuring the Havering family and their retainers (second edition).
- The Marylebone Mummy is a standalone adventure (second edition).
- Jewel of the Empire is a guide to the Raj in India (second edition).
- Faces in the Smoke Volume One and Volume Two are guides on various cults and organisations at large in the game; to be used as competitors, adversaries or allies within the game (second edition).
- Dragon in the Smoke

== Reception ==
Shannon Appelcline in his book Designers & Dragons describes that "Victoriana's setting was so 'punk' that some people called it 'Victorian Shadowrun'. When first released by Heresy Games, Victoriana had gotten average reviews, with most people saying that its strength lay in its setting. Meanwhile, there had been criticism over poor proofreading and poor attention to historical dates." Commenting on the second edition, he felt that "This new simplified game system combined well with strong editorial work from Peregrine and McDowall-Thomas to put the focus of the game on what was actually its strength: the setting." He further noted that "Victoriana Second Edition was an attractive book spotlighting a unique setting that got good reviews. Though it did not knock the ball out of the park, it was enough to show that Cubicle 7 was emerging on the RPG scene as a professional and notable company. It was also a strong enough product to receive continued support, with more than a half-dozen supplements published since… even as Cubicle 7 has gone on to much bigger things."

== Reviews ==
- Black Gate #15 (Spring 2011)
- Pyramid
- Backstab #45
- Valkyrie (Issue 27 - 2003)
- Fictional Reality (Issue 13 - Sep 2003)
- Legions Realm Monthly (Issue 17 - Feb 2004)
