= SLA Industries =

Tabletop role-playing game

- Cover of the first edition
- Designers: Dave Allsop
- Publishers: Nightfall Games
- Publication: 1993
- Genres: Gothic, cyberpunk, dystopia, splatterpunk
- Systems: Custom

SLA Industries (pronounced "slay") is a role-playing game first published in 1993 by Nightfall Games in Glasgow, Scotland. The game is set in a dystopian far-flung future in which the majority of the known universe is either owned or indirectly controlled by the eponymous corporation "SLA Industries" and incorporates themes from the cyberpunk, horror, and conspiracy genres.

The game combined concepts inspired by a range of aesthetics and ideas. Elements include: song lyrics from David Bowie and the Industrial music scene, cyberpunk fiction (including Blade Runner and Max Headroom), anime / manga (including Akira, Appleseed, Bubblegum Crisis, and Trigun), and the growing cultural obsession with the media (including 24-hour news services and the Gladiator TV Show).

== Setting ==
SLA Industries itself is a fictional corporation run by a mysterious and seemingly immortal creature called "Mr. Slayer", whose upper management team includes two other creatures like himself, "Intruder" and "Senti". The corporation is headquartered in "Mort City", a densely populated city-sprawl larger than Eurasia and surrounded by the urban ruins of the "Cannibal Sectors". It is all located on a vast planet (also called "Mort") that had been stripped of its natural resources to the point that the ecology had been utterly destroyed. SLA Industries controlled an undefined but vast number of planets, collectively referred to as the World of Progress, and governed them in accordance with Mr. Slayer's Big Picture. The setting is bleak and surreal, with much left deliberately ill-defined in the source material.

Players take the role of freelance employees of SLA Industries, called Operatives, living in Mort City and taking care of odd jobs assigned to them by the corporation. These jobs usually involve keeping the peace—chasing serial killers, hunting monsters in the sewers, quashing riots, foiling terrorist plots, and silencing dissidents are common themes. Appearance, style and branding are emphasized in the game world as much as combat ability, due to the omnipresence of television; for ambitious Operatives public persona and TV ratings are often as important as professional abilities. A supplement, the Contract Directory, also provides the option for players to play as celebrity gladiators called Contract Killers. As a role-playing experience, the game tends to be predisposed towards splatterpunk horror, noir, dark satire, and/or gunbunny high action. However, the complexity and Byzantine politics of the setting allow for slower-paced campaigns based around subversion, inter-departmental rivalry, and cut-throat power struggles within the company.

Along with humans, playable races include the drug-addicted mutant humans called "Frothers", the stealthy feline "Wraith Raiders", the formidably violent saurian "Shaktar", and the two 'Ebb' / pseudo-magic using races: the emotionally sensitive and charismatic Ebon, and their more sadistic and violent evolution, the "Brain Wasters". There are also a variety of biogenetic vat-grown warrior races called Stormers, produced by SLA to fight in their endless wars.

== Publication prior to 2nd Edition ==
SLA Industries was first published independently in 1993. The game was later bought by Wizards of the Coast late in 1994, after their success with Magic: The Gathering. It was later republished by Nightfall Games Ltd and distributed by Hogshead Publishing, until Hogshead Publishing closed down. Between 2003 and 2011 Cubicle 7 Entertainment produced new material, and in 2011 the license returned to Nightfall Games Ltd, who released supplements (known as Data Packets) as PDFs. In August, 2016, the Kickstarter for the SLA Industries: Cannibal Sector 1 miniatures game was launched by Daruma Productions and Nightfall Games. On 22 June 2018, Nightfall Games announced that Daruma Productions was entering the liquidation process and Nightfall would be taking over completion of the Kickstarter. Cannibal Sector 1, the last 1st Edition product was published in 2019.

== Second Edition ==
SLA Industries: 2nd Edition
- Cover of the second edition
- Designers: Dave Allsop, Jared Earle, Mark Rapson, Chris "Shep" Shepperson
- Publishers: Nightfall Games
- Publication: 2021
- Genres: Gothic, cyberpunk, dystopia, splatterpunk
- Systems: S5S

A new Kickstarter campaign launched in September 2019, for SLA Industries 2nd Edition. It raised £90,444 from 1,281 backers. The KS also funded a new GM Screen Pack. Additionally, a free Quickstart was released in August 2019 to introduce the new rules, ahead of the Kickstart campaign. The pledge fulfilment started in December 2020, and the products went on general sale in January 2021.

A second Kickstarter was announced in July 2021 for the first sourcebooks for SLA Industries 2nd Edition to start on the 24th of August 2021. The first two books announced are Threat Analysis 1: Collateral and Species Guide 1: Shaktar/Wraithen.

SLA Industries 2nd Edition won a Judges' Spotlight award in the 2021 ENnies.

A third Kickstarter was announced in June 2024 for the 2nd Threat Analysis Sourcebook: CULT and an Operative's Handbook to start on the 18th of June 2024.

== Savage World Edition ==
On 26 Feb 2026 Nightfall Games announced plans to release a licensed Savage worlds edition. Three volumes are projected to be released in 2026.

== Product line ==
“The SLA Industries for Savage Worlds RPG” (all published by Nightfall Games)

- “The SLA Industries for Savage Worlds RPG” Quick Start (May 2026) PDF and softback. A limited (100 copies) playtester’s edition was published for UKGE2026.

2nd Edition Publications (all published by Nightfall Games)

- "SLA Industries 2nd Edition" Core Rulebook (Jan 2021) including 5 cover variants.
- "SLA Industries 2nd Edition GM Screen Pack", includes a GM Screen and 16 page booklet (Jan 2021).
- "SLA Industries 2nd Edition: Quick Start", a 48-page PDF introducing the 2nd edition ruleset. The printed version was published Jan 2021.
- "SLA Industries 2nd Edition: COLLATERAL", a 240-page sourcebook focused on gangs, Manchines and other self-generated enemies. The first of the 4Cs book (July 2023).
- "SLA Industries 2nd Edition: CULT", a 240-page sourcebook focussed on the religious, blood and other cults of the world of progress. The second of the 4Cs book (April 2026).
- "SLA Industries 2nd Edition: Operative's Handbook", a sourcebook focussed on supplying assets for the players. (April 2026).
- "SLA Industries 2nd Edition: Shaktar/Wraithen", an 80-page sourcebook focused on the names playable species. The first of the Species Guide books (July 2023).
- "SLA Industries 2nd Edition: Hunter Sheets Data Packet 1", a 48 page softback sourcebook (July 2023).
- “SLASHER magazine”. An in-setting small magazine presenting famous and wannabe criminals (July 2023).
- “Progress Reports”. A series of PDF supplements released sporadically since June 2020. At present, there are 9 documents (Progress Reports 0-8).
- “Progress Reports: Codified Zero to Five”. The first six progress reports printed in hardback (June 2024).
- “Progress Reports: Codified Six to Ten”. Five progress reports printed in hardback (May 2026).
- Conversion Documents for "Cannibal Sector One" and “Hunter Sheets 2”. PDFs to allow the use of the 1st Edition books with the 2nd edition ruleset (Jan 2021).
- “Headshots” Image Packs. Each Headshots Image pack includes at least 10 high res JPEG images featuring character art by Dave Allsop. At present there are five packs.

1st Edition Publications: The content of the majority of the following products have been (or soon will be) represented in second edition products. The main SLA Industries rulebook, Cannibal Sector One and the Hunter Sheets contain useable material for 2nd Edition:

- SLA Industries Main Rulebook (ISBN 1 899749 23 3) published by Nightfall Games
- Karma Sourcebook (ISBN 1 880992 56 6) published by Nightfall Games (Out of Print)
- GM screen(Out of Print)
- Hunter Sheets Issue 1 Supplement (ISBN 978 0 9555423 1 2) published by Cubicle 7 (out of Print)
- Hunter Sheets Issue 2 Supplement (ISBN 978 0 9956497 1 2) published by Daruma Productions and Nightfall Games
- "Gator Stormer" Data Packet, a PDF only Supplement published by Nightfall Games (no longer available).
- "Klicks End" Data Packet, a PDF only Supplement published by Nightfall Games (no longer available - 2nd Edition can be found in Progress Report 7).
- "Momic 0.1" Data Packet, a PDF only Supplement published by Nightfall Games (republished with Progress Report 6).
- "Dream" Data Packet, a PDF only Supplement published by Nightfall Games (no longer available).
- "Hominid" Data Packet, a PDF only Supplement published by Nightfall Games (no longer available).
- "Hunters Sheets: Red Alert" Data Packet, a PDF only Supplement published by Nightfall Games (no longer available).
- "Cannibal Sector One" Supplement (352-page full colour hardback book or pdf published by Nightfall Games). This was the last publication for 1st Edition (out of print).

The following 1st Edition books and documents are no longer considered canon and are out of print:

- "Mort" Sourcebook (ISBN 0 9522176 6 X) published by Wizards of the Coast
- "The Key of Delhyread" Scenario (ISBN 978 1 899749 24 9) published by Hogshead Publishing
- "The Contract Directory" Sourcebook (ISBN 978 1 899749 29 4) published by Hogshead Publishing
- "CS1" Sourcebook (ISBN 978 0 9555423 0 5) published by Cubicle 7
- "Ursa Carrien" Data Packet, a PDF only Supplement published by Nightfall Games

== The Writers' Bible ==
Nightfall Games produced the SLA Industries Writers Bible, sometimes simply referred to as The Bible or The Truth, to allow freelance writers to grasp the complicated background of the game. The terms of the associated non-disclosure agreement required that the contents of the document remain secret. Following an extended hiatus in production of official SLA Industries material, editor Tim Dedopulos released the bible to the members of the SLA Industries email discussion list in 1998. The fans' reaction to The Truth was not entirely warm, and the remaining members of Nightfall Games made it clear that further redistribution of the bible was not permitted without their explicit permission. The writers have since made it clear that the bible was not intended for mass consumption - it had not been edited to the same standard as the published material, as it was an internal document used only to keep the work of disparate authors consistent with the intentions of Nightfall Games. It has also been explained that the process of revealing The Truth was originally to have happened over the course of several publications, each one containing more elements of an increasingly refined version of the backstory. In 2005 Cubicle 7 re-released the old Writers Bible, stating that this was no longer the Truth used internally for further development of material. It is no longer accessible and not considered canon by Nightfall Games.

== Reception ==
Denys Bakriges reviewed SLA Industries in White Wolf #44 (June, 1994), rating it a 3.5 out of 5 and stated that "SLA offers a tone of information on a lot of ideas. For those who want to tackle this game, it offers many unusual concepts. Sci-fi aficionados shouldn't be disappointed."

== Reviews ==
- Backstab #24
- Casus Belli #79
- d8 Magazine #2
- Dosdediez (Número 3 - Mar/Abr 1994)
- Wallis, James (1994). "S.L.A. Industries". Inter*action (1): 118–122. ISSN 1353-4548. Review
- Rebel Times #2
- Rollespilsmagasinet Fønix (Danish) (Issue 6 - January/February 1995)
