= Mongoose Publishing =

Tabletop role-playing game publisher

- Type: Game Publisher
- Industry: Role-playing, card games and miniature wargaming publisher
- Founded: 2001
- Headquarters: Swindon, England
- Products: Traveller, Paranoia role-playing games
- Website: www.mongoosepublishing.com

Mongoose Publishing is a British manufacturer of role-playing games, miniatures, and card games, publishing material since 2001. Its licenses include products based on the science fiction properties Traveller, Judge Dredd, and Paranoia, as well as fantasy titles.

== History ==
Mongoose Publishing was founded in Swindon, England, in 2001 by Matthew Sprange and Alex Fennell. Sprange initially wanted to publish a miniatures game, but he ultimately went with the less expensive alternative of using Wizards of the Coast's d20 System license. It grew out of the d20 System boom sparked by Dungeons & Dragons 3rd edition. The first release, the Slayer's Guides, concentrated on different monster types for the d20 system, while the subsequent Quintessential books, detailed specific character classes. The latter was to span three years and thirty-six different titles.

In 2003 the company released the magazine Signs and Portents, a house organ aimed at supplementing and supporting Mongoose's products, as well as a range of generic standalone products based on the d20 System, collectively known as the "OGL series". Further acquisitions followed the same year, including the rights to a roleplaying game based on Conan the Barbarian (released in 2004), the roleplaying game Paranoia and a joint venture with d20 System portal EN World, the EN World Gamer quarterly magazine. Signs & Portents was turned into an online magazine after two years. In 2007, Mongoose added the licenses for new editions of the classic RPGs RuneQuest and Traveller.

In 2008 Mongoose announced that it was ceasing production and marketing of its miniatures ranges and would, for the time being, concentrate solely on the production of RPGs and miniatures rules.

In September 2008, Matthew Sprange announced that Mongoose Publishing had "joined the Rebellion, becoming a sister company to Rebellion itself."

In October 2008, Sprange announced that Mongoose Publishing would be publishing the new Lejendary Adventure line for Gygax Games.

In May 2011, Sprange announced that Mongoose Publishing and Issaries Inc. had parted ways. Mongoose would cease publication of RuneQuest, though they retain the copyrights to the revised RuneQuest II core rule system, which was re-released under the title Legend.

In 2025, it was announced that Mongoose Publishing and World's Largest RPGs would partner to release an expansion of Traveller using the D&D 5th Edition ruleset.

== Games and products ==
=== Miniature Games ===
- Noble Armada: A Call to Arms
- Babylon 5: A Call to Arms
- Judge Dredd: Gangs of Mega-City One
- Starship Troopers: The Miniatures Game
- Mighty Armies
- Battlefield Evolution
- Victory at Sea
- A Call to Arms: Star Fleet (A partnership with Amarillo Design Bureau, based on the Star Fleet Universe)

=== Role-playing games and supplements ===
- The Extraordinary Adventures of Baron Munchausen
- Armageddon: 2089
- Babylon 5 Roleplaying Game
- Cities of Fantasy series
  - Skraag: City of Orcs
  - Stormhaven: City of a Thousand Seas
  - Highthrone: City of the Clouds
  - Stonebridge: City of Illusions
- Classic Play series
- Conan: The Roleplaying Game - translated into Spanish by the Spanish publishing house Edge Entertainment in 2005, into French by UbIK in 2007, and in Italian by Stratelibri/Wyrd Edizioni in 2006
- CthulhuTech
- Elric of Melnibone
- Encyclopedia Arcane series
- Fey Magic: Dreaming the Reverie
- Infernum
- Jeremiah: The Roleplaying Game (based on the TV series)
- The Judge Dredd Roleplaying Game
- Lone Wolf: The Roleplaying Game and the Lone Wolf Multiplayer Game Book
- Macho Women with Guns
- Noctum
- OGL Ancients
- OGL CyberNet
- OGL Horror
- OGL Steampunk
- OGL Wild West
- Paranoia
- Power Classes series
- Quintessential series, starting with The Quintessential Fighter (2002)
- RuneQuest
- Sláine: The Roleplaying Game of Celtic Heroes (based on the comics)
- Slayers Guide series
- Shield Maidens
- Stars Without Number
- Starship Troopers: The Roleplaying Game
- Traveller
- Travellers' Tales series
- Ultimate series
- Wars RPG

=== Periodicals ===
- Signs & Portents
- EN World Gamer
