= The One Ring Roleplaying Game =

Tabletop RPG set in Tolkien's Middle-earth

The One Ring
- Designers: Francesco Nepitello, Marco Maggi
- Publishers: Cubicle 7 (First Edition); Free League Publishing (Second Edition)
- Publication: 2011 First Edition; 2022 Second Edition
- Genres: Fantasy

The One Ring Roleplaying Game is a tabletop role-playing game set in J. R. R. Tolkien's Middle-earth, set at the time between The Hobbit and The Lord of the Rings. Designed by Francesco Nepitello and Marco Maggi, the game was initially published by Cubicle 7 in 2011 under the title The One Ring: Adventures over the Edge of the Wild. Cubicle 7 continued to publish the first edition of the game until 2019. Nepitello and Maggi developed the second edition, which is published by Free League Publishing under the title The One Ring Roleplaying Game.

== History ==
The game was first published in 2011 under the title The One Ring: Adventures over the Edge of the Wild. This first edition core book (more exactly two booklets in a cardboard case) and the majority of subsequent products supported play in the portion of the region of Rhovanion known as "The Wild", the setting of the later portions of The Hobbit east of the Misty Mountains. That was due to the project of releasing two other up-coming core books dealing with other regions, countries and kingdoms of Middle-earth, but instead of pursuing the idea of releasing two more core books, a revised edition was released in Summer 2014, which saw the original two-volume slipcase set combined into a single hardback edition. This version was substantially re-edited and re-laid out, with errata and clarifications added. Cubicle 7 also released a Clarifications and Amendments Document at the same time, to support owners of the previous edition. As of the 2014 re-release, the name was changed from The One Ring: Adventures Over the Edge of the Wild to The One Ring Roleplaying Game.

During the first edition run, the base game and some of the supplements have been released in English, French, German, Italian and Spanish.

A second edition of The One Ring was announced but never released by Cubicle 7. In 2019 the company experienced a contractual issue preventing them from producing the game and on 27 November 2019 they announced that they would cease publishing both The One Ring and Adventures in Middle-earth. The licence was acquired in 2020 by Free League Publishing. On 9 March 2020 Free League Publishing announced that it would publish a second edition of the game with Nepitello and Maggi as authors and lead designers. On 27 September 2020, Nepitello, when interviewed by Free League Publishing, announced that the second edition would be set in the Eriador region of Middle Earth. The second edition was initially released using the crowdfunding site Kickstarter and included a starter set focused on The Shire. The game later became available as a general release by the company.

== Game mechanics ==
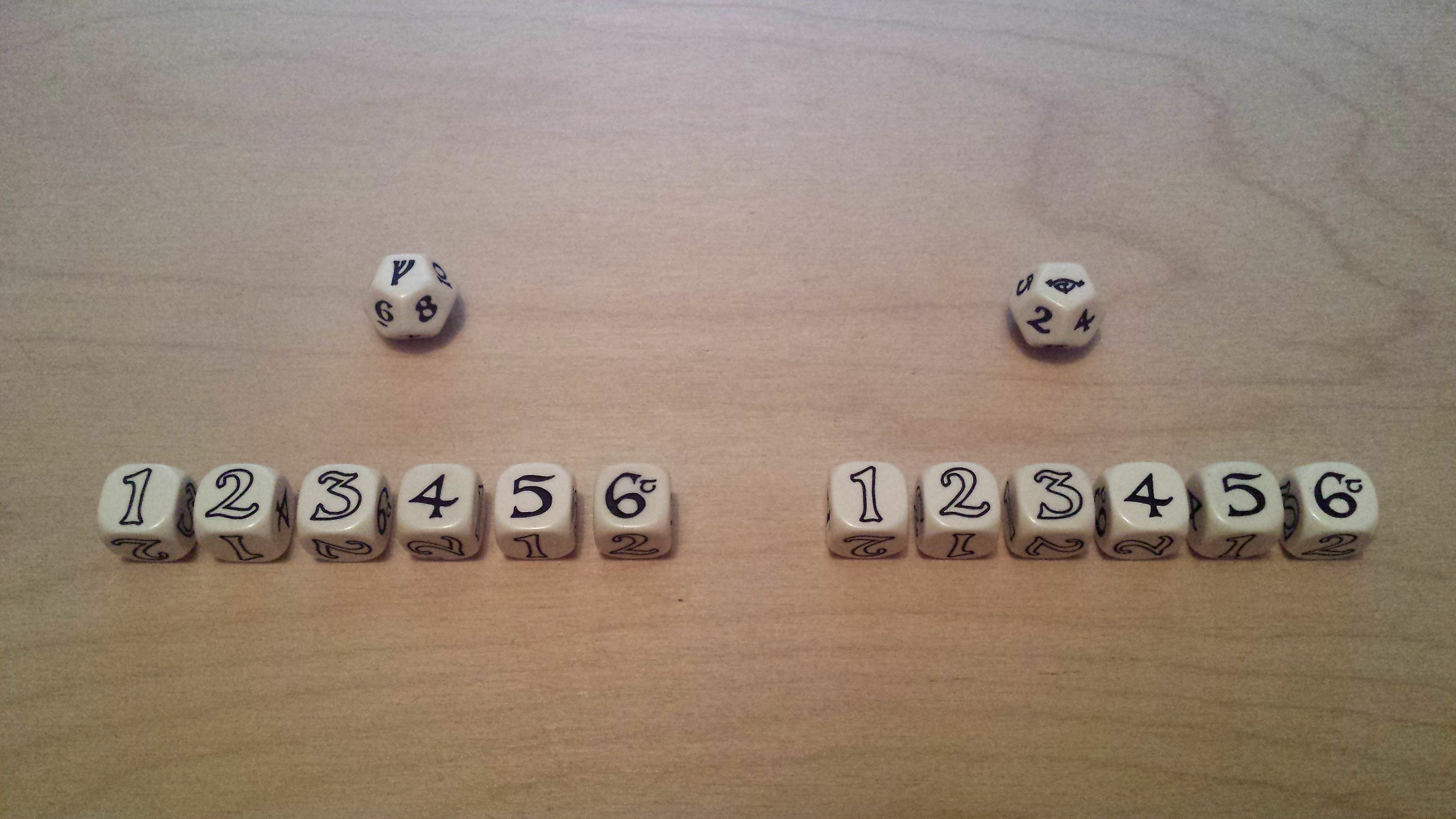
Two sets of The One Ring dice, with all runes visible as mentioned.

Games of The One Ring are split into two phases: the Adventuring phase and the Fellowship phase. In an Adventuring phase, a company of adventurers heads off from their homes and into the Wild, in search of adventure; whereas the Fellowship phase provides heroes with the opportunity to rest and recuperate, to practise their skills or pursue a noble undertaking.

The One Ring Roleplaying Game uses a special set of dice: the twelve-sided Feat die, which is marked with numbers 1–10, as well as two special symbols, Gandalf's rune and the Eye of Sauron, and a six-sided Success die, which is numbered 1–6, with a Tengwar rune on the 6. A regular d12 and d6 can be substituted.

When a roll is made, it consists of the Feat die plus a number of Success dice equal to the skill being used. The sum is compared to the Target Number of the action (typically 14).

What sets the game apart from other fantasy/adventure RPGs is the factoring-in of the hardship involved in travelling in the wilderness for any length of time. The rules covering the making of journeys across country in Rhovanion (the Middle Earth setting of the game as represented in the original core rulebook) involve an easy-to-administer mechanism for attrition, making such journeys a challenge in and of themselves. Consequences of this typically play out as challenges arising for a given "role" in a party of adventurers, with suggested roles taken by specific player characters at the journey's start being those of scout, guide, lookout and hunter.

== First edition releases ==
First Edition, published by Cubicle 7

- Lore-master's Screen and Lake-town Supplement contains a GM screen with reference tables on one side and Jon Hodgson's depiction of Esgaroth on the other. It also contains the Lake-town supplement, including the Men of the Lake heroic culture.
- Tales from Wilderland contains seven ready-to-play adventures that can either be played on their own, or together to form a campaign.
- The Heart of the Wild is the setting supplement for Wilderland, including the banks of the Anduin, the foothills of the Misty Mountains and Mirkwood. It contains descriptions of the regions, new characters and monsters.
- The Darkening of Mirkwood is a companion volume to The Heart of the Wild, using the material in that supplement to form a 30-year epic campaign.
- Rivendell is the first supplement to be set outside of Wilderland. It covers Eastern Eriador, Rivendell itself and the old kingdoms of Arnor and Angmar. It also includes rules for Rangers of the North and High Elves of Rivendell. This supplement also expands the original territory described in the first print of the first edition, "covering not only Rivendell itself, but Angmar, Fornost, Mount Gram, Tharbad and everywhere in between."
- Ruins of the North is a companion volume to Rivendell. It includes six ready-to-play adventures that can either be played on their own, or together to form a campaign.
- Hobbit Tales from the Green Dragon Inn is a standalone storytelling card game that also includes rules for using the cards in The One Ring Roleplaying Game. Production and sales have stopped.
- Horse-lords of Rohan is the supplement describing the kingdom of Rohan, its history, its lands, and the people who live there. It includes rules for player character Riders of Rohan and the hillfolk of Dunland.
- Erebor: the Lonely Mountain details the Kingdom Under the Mountain, including its history, crafts, surroundings, and people. Rules are included for characters to play Dwarves of the Iron Hills and Dwarves of the Grey Mountains, as well as rules for GMs to create dragons.
- Journeys and Maps is a collection of 4 double sided poster maps, along with a 32-page booklet adding more options to the Journey phase, and an index of places in Middle-earth.
- Adventurer's Companion is the supporting or expansion supplement, expanding the game system by introducing five new cultures and optional rules for players.
- Bree is a mini region guide and adventure supplement as it contains three adventures set close to the Shire in Eriador.
- Oaths of the Riddermark is a companion volume to Horse-lords of Rohan. It includes new adventures set in and around the region of Rohan. Most of these are designed to be a campaign.
- The Laughter of Dragons is the last first edition supplement, a companion volume to Erebor: the Lonely Mountain. It includes new adventures set around the Lonely Mountain.

== Second edition releases ==
- The One Ring RPG, Second Edition contains revised rules for playing and running the roleplaying game, including adversaries and lore about Eriador. (5E title: The Lord of the Rings Roleplaying)
- The One Ring Loremaster's Screen & Rivendell Compendium contains a GM screen with reference tables. It also contains the Rivendell supplement with information about The Last Homely House and rules to create High Elf Player-heroes. (Rivendell supplement reprinted in Realms of the Three Rings/Keepers of the Elven-Rings)
- The One Ring Starter Set is an introductory box set which includes starter rules, pregenerated characters, dice, roleplaying aids such as cards and maps, an introductory set of adventures and a region guide to The Shire. (portions included in 5E: Shire Adventures)
- The One Ring Strider Mode is a PDF-only release which presents additional and modified rules to facilitate solo play.
- Peoples of Wilderland and Lifepaths are another two PDF-only releases. They include stats for three first-edition cultures and some ways to consider the background narrative for characters. Initially produced as Kickstarter stretch goals, they may be released in hard copy.
- Ruins of the Lost Realms is an adventure compendium which includes lore covering the ancient kingdom of Arnor, a campaign for loremasters, and twelve locations for modular use in campaigns. (5E title: Ruins of Eriador)
- Tales from the Lone-lands is an adventure compendium set in the lone-lands of northwestern Middle-earth. (5E title: Tales from Eriador)
- Moria – Through the Doors of Durin is an expansion covering Khazad-dûm. It was the subject of a Kickstarter in September 2023. A map of Moria is included. (5E title: Moria – Shadow of Khazad-Dûm)
- Realms of the Three Rings is an expansion covering the elven realms of Lórien, Rivendell and Lindon. It includes twelve new landmarks for modular use in campaigns. (5E title: Keepers of the Elven-Rings)
- The One Ring Starter Set - Over Hill and Under Hill is announced to be published in July 2025. It is a new starter set located in the lone lands of northern Eriador.
- Hands of the White Wizard is an adventure compendium about the wizard Saruman prior to his corruption set in and around Isengard.
- Hobbit Tales is a book version of the original starter set adventures and Shire supplement.

== Awards ==
- 2012 Golden Geek - Best Art and Presentation
- 2012 Gold ENnie Award - Best Art (Interior)
- 2012 Silver ENnie Award - Best Free Product
- 2012 Silver ENnie Award - Best Production Values
- 2012 Best of Show for Best Role Play Game
- 2012 Origins Award Nominee - Best Roleplaying Game
- 2013 ENnie Award Nominee - Best Accessory for The Loremaster's Screen and Laketown Book
- 2015 ENnie Award Nominee - Best Accessory for The Darkening of Mirkwood
- 2015 ENnie Award Nominee - Best Accessory for Hobbit Tales
- 2022 Gold ENnie Award - Best Art, Interior The One Ring RPG, Second Edition
- 2024 Graal d'or - Best new edition for L'Anneau unique, seconde édition
