= Starblazer Adventures =

Tabletop science fiction role-playing game

Starblazer Adventures is a space opera role-playing game published by Cubicle 7 in 2008. It is based on the British Starblazer comic and uses the FATE rules.

== History ==
The game was released in August 2008 at Gen Con Indianapolis, followed by a hard-cover edition in June 2009. In July it was nominated for three Ennies. Later the same year, the supplement Mindjammer - Starblazer Adventures in the Second Age of Space by Sarah Newton appeared. It won a Judge's Spotlight Award at the 2010 Ennies. (See also the 2014 Mindjammer - The Roleplaying Game.)

Cubicle 7 released several supplements for the game through 2013. Some were shortlisted for awards, both at the Indie RPG Awards and the ENnies.

In 2014, Cubicle 7 ceased to publish and support the game as their licensing agreement came to an end. All PDF material was removed from the company's online store, and the game remains out of print.

== Reception ==
In a review of Starblazer Adventures in Black Gate, Howard Andrew Jones said "It is, simply, the most well thought-out comprehensive space game ruleset I've ever seen under one cover. It's entertaining, thorough, and the system itself is top notch. If you like rule sets that are more about story than crunch, this book's for you. Highly recommended."
