= Cubicle 7 =

Tabletop role-playing games publisher

Cubicle 7 Entertainment Ltd
- Company logo
- Type: Privately held company
- Industry: Game publisher
- Founded: 2006
- Founder: Angus Abranson and Dominic McDowall-Thomas
- Headquarters: Gormanston, County Meath, Ireland
- Key people: Dominic McDowall-Thomas, TS Luikart
- Products: Warhammer Fantasy Roleplay fourth edition; The One Ring Roleplaying Game; Doctor Who: Adventures in Time and Space; Doctor Who: The Card Game; Soulbound
- Website: www.cubicle7games.com

Cubicle 7 Entertainment Ltd is an Irish games company that creates and publishes tabletop games. Best known for its Doctor Who and Lord of the Rings games, Cubicle 7 offers titles covering a range of licensed and self-developed properties.

== History ==
Angus Abranson and Dave Allsop formed the role-playing game company Cubicle 7 with the aim of publishing new material for Allsop's role-playing game SLA Industries. Abranson brought on his friend, Dominic McDowall-Thomas, in January 2004 to edit the books, but later in 2004 production was halted and Allsop left Cubicle 7 for other opportunities. In late 2006, Abranson and McDowall-Thomas formed Cubicle 7 Entertainment Limited, as its partners. In 2006, Cubicle 7 purchased the British small-press publisher Heresy Games and published a new edition of their 2003 role-playing game Victoriana in 2009. The company's first licensed game was obtained in 2006, with Starblazer Adventures published in 2008. Cubicle 7 then licensed the French game Qin: The Warring States in 2007, and in 2009, obtained the licence to produce their Doctor Who Roleplaying Game. In 2008, Cubicle 7 began partnering with small-press publishers to do the publishing and distribution for them, including Adamant Entertainment, Alephtar Games, Arc Dream Publishing, Cakebread & Walton, Arion Games, John Wick Presents, Khepera Publishing, Monkey House Games, Postmortem Studios, Savage Mojo, and Triple Ace Games.

Cubicle 7 relocated from Oxford, United Kingdom to Stamullen, Ireland in 2018.

== Games ==
=== Role-playing games ===
Cubicle 7 designs, develops and publishes the following role-playing games:

- Doctor Who Roleplaying Game (role-playing game based on the TV series)
  Won an Origins Award for Best Card Game in 2013.
- Primeval (role-playing game based on the TV series)
- The Laundry (role-playing game based on the Laundry Files series of novels)
- Cthulhu Britannica (a series of supplements and adventures set in historical England, for the Call of Cthulhu role-playing game)
- Victoriana (roleplay in a fantasy alternative Victorian era). The game published by Heresy Games in 2003, with second and third editions by Cubicle 7 in 2009 and 2013. It was reviewed by Black Gate #15 (Spring 2011)
- World War Cthulhu (a fantasy World War II and Cold War setting for the Call of Cthulhu RPG - it requires the Call of Cthulhu rulebook to play)
- Warhammer Fantasy Role-Play (fourth edition)
- Warhammer: The Old World RPG - due for release in October 2026
- Soulbound: Warhammer Age of Sigmar Role-Play - set in Warhammer Age of Sigmar
- Wrath & Glory - A Warhammer 40,000 role-playing game, transferred from Ulisses Spiele. Cubicle 7 published an updated version of the core rulebook in April 2020.
- Imperium Maledictum - a Warhammer 40,000 role-playing game, successor to Dark Heresy.

=== Card, dice and board Games ===
Cubicle 7 designs, develops and publishes the following card, dice and board games:

- Doctor Who: The Card Game (based on the TV series)
- Hobbit Tales (story telling card game set in Middle-earth)
- Dalek Dice (A Doctor Who push your luck dice rolling game)

=== Publishing partners ===
Cubicle 7 also works with a select group of publishing partners to bring their games to a wider market:

- Hot War (Contested Ground)
- Cold City (Contested Ground)
- 3:16 - Carnage Amongst the Stars (Box Ninja Games)

=== Former licences ===
- Rocket Age (a retro-pulp space opera role-playing game, set in an alternative 20th century where Einstein, Tesla and Ray Armstrong rode the first rocket ship to Mars, entering in a new space opera era).

Cubicle 7 announced they were returning the rights to the game's designer on 30 June 2017. It is now published by Why Not Games, including reprints of books originally published by Cubicle 7.

- Adventures in Middle-earth (a licensed OGL compatible Middle-earth setting for fifth edition)
- The One Ring Roleplaying Game (the current Middle-earth licensed official role-playing game)

Cubicle 7 announced on 27 November 2019 that they would cease publishing The One Ring and Adventures in Middle-earth properties. Cubicle 7 had published The One Ring for eight years at that time.

- Lone Wolf Adventure Game (based on Joe Dever's Lone Wolf gamebook series)

Cubicle 7 announced on 2 July 2021 that they would cease publishing the Lone Wolf Adventure Game property.

- Qin (a wuxia role-playing game, set in China during the Warring States period)
- Yggdrasill (roleplay in the Viking Age)
- Kuro (a horror-cyberpunk role-playing game, set in Japan in the year 2046)
- Keltia (roleplay in the post-Roman Britain, during the 5th century)

Cubicle 7 published English-language translations of the above 4 role-playing games from the French publisher "Le Septième Cercle" until the licence was ended June 30 2017.

== Awards ==
Cubicle 7 has won 12 ENnie Awards, 2 Origins Awards, Best in Show, Lucca 2012, and a Golden Geek.

== Notable events ==
In June 2009, Cubicle 7 announced that it had joined the Rebellion Developments group of companies.

In November 2011, Angus Abranson left Cubicle 7 to form Chronicle City.

In December 2014, Cubicle 7 announced that it had left the Rebellion Developments group of companies, following a successful management buy out led by CEO Dominic McDowall.

In December 2017, Dominic McDowall and Cubicle 7 announced that they would be producing a new RPG in the Warhammer universe, Warhammer: Age of Sigmar. This game has been part of a personal quest of McDowall to bring back the style of play with Warhammer he had played in his youth.
