= 2023 ENNIE Award winners =

Winners of the 2023 ENNIE awards

- Awarded for: Best role-playing games of previous year
- Country: United Kingdom & United States
- Presented by: Gen Con
- First award: 2001

The following are the winners of the 23rd annual ENNIE Awards, held in 2023.

== Spotlight awards ==
Judges' Spotlight Winners:

- Kevin Combs– One Breath left, Stout Stoat Press, Author: Ian Howard
- Jim D’Alessio – Dungeons of Drakkenheim, Ghostfire Gaming, Authors: Monty Martin, Kelly McLaughlin
- Christopher Gath – Void 1680 AM, Bannerless Games, Author: Ken Lowery
- Candace McAfee – Moonlight on Roseville Beach: A Queer Game of Disco and Cosmic Horror, R. Rook Studio, Authors: Richard Ruane, Rob Abrazado, Bendi Barrett, Sharang Biswas, Rick Chia, Alison Cybe, Ezakur, Ethan Harvey, Maxwell Lander, Catherine Ramen, Erin Roberts, Ennis Rook Bashe, Noora Rose, R.J. Ryan, Sean F. Smith, Anne Toole, Preston Leslie, Logan Rollins
- Shauna Ratliff – Faecraft, Exalted Funeral, Author: Will Purves

== List of gold and silver winners ==
Category	Gold Winner	Silver Winner
Best Adventure	Vaesen (RPG) – Seasons of Mystery, Free League Authors: Gabrielle de Bourg, Tomas Harenstam, Andreas Marklund, Kiku Pukk Harenstam	Journeys through the Radiant Citadel, Wizards of the Coast Authors: Justice Ramin Arman, Dominique Dickey, Ajit A. George, Basheer Ghouse, Alastor Guzman, D. Fox Harrell, T.K. Johnson, Felice Tzehuei Kuan, Surena Marie, Mimi Mondal, Mario Ortegón, Miyuki Jane Pinckard, Pam Punzalan, Erin Roberts, Terry H. Romero, Stephanie Yoon
Best Aid/Accessory – Digital	Rimspace Planet Generator, Anodyne Printware	The Session Zero System, Mythic Grove Productions, Authors: Gabe Hicks & Elise Rezendes
Best Aid/Accessory – Non – Digital	Decuma: the R&D for your RPG, Golden Lasso Games	The Witcher Hybrid Dice Set – Wolf: Golem’s Heart, Q Workshop
Best Art, Cover	Historica Arcanum: The City of Crescent, Metis Creative Artist: Yağmur Kiyak	Swords of the Serpentine, Pelgrane Press Artist: Jérôme Huguenin
Best Art, Interior	Vaesen (RPG) – Mythic Britain & Ireland, Free League Publishing Artists: Johan Egerkrans, Anton Vitus, Gustave Dorr	Seven Sinners, Mana Project Studio Art Director: Michele Paroli Artists: Domenico Cava, Mirko Failoni
Best Cartography	Blade Runner RPG Starter Set, Free League Publishing Christian Granath	Claw Atlas: New Maps for Beak, Feather & Bone, Possible Worlds Games Jonathan Yee
Best Electronic Book	Brindlewood Bay, The Gauntlet Gaming Community Authors: Jason Cordova, David Morrison, Calvin Johns, Petra Volkhausen, Steffie de Vaan	Host and Hostility: Three Regency Call of Cthulhu Scenarios, Miskatonic Repository Author: SR Sellens
Best Family Game / Product	Avatar Legends: The Roleplaying Game Starter Set, Magpie Games Authors: Sharang Biswas, Elizabeth Chaipraditkul, Brendan Conway, James Mendez Hodes, Yeonsoo Julian Kim, Simon Moody, Lysa Penrose, Mark Diaz Truman, Daniel Kwan, Sen-Foong Lim	The Goblings, Slowquest Author: Bodie Hartley
Best Free Game / Product	Root: The RPG Talon Hill Quickstart, Magpie Games Author: David Castro	Shrine of the Jaguar Princess, Trident Gamebooks LLC Author: Sersa Victory
Best Game	Fabula Ultima – Core Rulebook, Need Games, Rooster Games Author: Emanuele Galletto Editing/Sensitivity: Nicola Degobbis, Courteney Penney, Marta Palvarini Art: Moryo, Christian Benevides, Lorenzo Magalotti, Susu Nonohara, Catthy Trinh, ExtantLily, Ben Henry, Sascha Naderer, Lorc	Trophy RPG, The Gauntlet Gaming Community, Hedgemaze Press Author: Jesse Ross Editing: Lauren McManamon, Jason Cordova, David LaFreniere Art: Anna Zee, Rian Magee, Anton Cheykin
Best Layout and Design	Blade Runner: The Roleplaying Game, Free League Publishing Christian Granath	Frontier Scum, Games Omnivorous Karl Druid, Chalkdown
Best Monster/Adversary	Ruins of Symbaroum – Bestiary, Free League Publishing Authors: Mattias Johnsson Haake, Mattias Lilja, and Jacob Rodgers Art: Martin Grip	Fateforge Book 5 – Creatures 2 Netherworld, Studio Agate Author: Ariane “Linden Oliver” Clovis, Diana “Kjarllan” Lutton, Etienne “Etmer_Fachronies” Mercier, Frederick “Atorgael” Pilling, Joelle “ Iris” Deschamp, Nicola Bernardelli, Thomas “ Kaer” Navarro, and William Perceval “Merlin” Huber
Best Online Content	Linda Codega’s io9 RPG reporting, Gizmodo / io9	TTRPGKids
Best Organized Play	Under the Cover of Stars Authors: Marik Montalvan, Jens Sundqvist	Cat’s Paws, Neo Tokyo Project Author: Jason Koh
Best Podcast	Seth Skorkowsky	How We Roll
Best Production Values	Warhammer Fantasy Roleplay – The Enemy Within: Empire in Ruins Collector’s Edition, Cubicle 7 Entertainment Ltd	Blackbirds RPG: Servant of the Gods Edition, Andrews McMeel Publishing
Best RPG Related Product	Owlbear Plush, Metal Weave Games	Dragonbond: Dragons of the Red Moon, Draco Studios
Best Rules	Avatar Legends: The Roleplaying Game, Magpie Games	Rivers of London: The Roleplaying Game, Chaosium Inc.
Best Setting	Vaesen RPG – Mythic Britain & Ireland, Free League Publishing Authors: Graeme Davis, Mathew Tyler-Jones, Dave Semark	Swords of the Serpentine, Pelgrane Press Authors: Kevin Kulp and Emily Dresner
Best Supplement	Barkeep on the Borderlands, Prismatic Wasteland Authors: W.F. Smith, Anne Hunter, Ava Islam, Ben Laurence, Chris McDowell, Emmy Verte, Gus L., Luka Rejec, Marcia B., Nick LS Whelan, Ty Pitre, Zedeck Siew	Into the Cess and Citadel, Wet Ink Games, LLC Author: Charlie Ferguson-Avery and Alex Coggon
Best Writing	Swords of the Serpentine, Pelgrane Press Authors: Kevin Kulp, Emily Dresner Editing/Sensitivity: Tim Gray, Cathriona Tobin, Misha Bushyager	The Wildsea: RPG, Mythopoeia Games Author: Felix Isaacs Editing/Sensitivity: Ryan Khan, Ellan Aldryc
Product of the Year	Vaesen RPG – Mythic Britain & Ireland, Free League Publishing	Fabula Ultima – Core Rulebook, Need Games
