= 2023 in games =

This page lists board and card games, wargames, miniatures games, and tabletop role-playing games published in 2023. For video games, see 2023 in video gaming.

== Games released or invented in 2023 ==
- Apiary
- Apocalypse Keys
- Candela Obscura
- Blade Runner: The Roleplaying Game
- Daybreak
- Disney Lorcana
- Earth
- Eat the Reich
- Fabula Ultima
- Forest Shuffle
- If I Were a Lich, Man
- Koriko: A Magical Year
- Liminal Horror
- Marvel Multiverse Role-Playing Game
- Ma Nishtana
- Nekojima
- Shadowdark
- Sky Team
- Star Wars: The Deckbuilding Game
- Village: Big Box
- Zin Never Dies

== Game awards given in 2023 ==
| Award | Category | Winner | Ref. |
|---|---|---|---|
| Spiel des Jahres | Spiel des Jahres | Dorfromantik: The Board Game | |
| Spiel des Jahres | Kinderspiel des Jahres | Mysterium Kids | |
| Spiel des Jahres | Kennerspiel des Jahres | Challengers! | |
| Deutscher Spielepreis | Deutscher Spielepreis | Planet Unknown | |
| Deutscher Spielepreis | Deutscher Kinderspielepreis | Mysterium Kids | |
| As d'Or | | Akropolis | |
| Dicebreaker's Tabletop Awards | Rising Star: Publisher | Hot Banana Games | |
| Dicebreaker's Tabletop Awards | Rising Star: Designer | Cassi Mothwin | |
| Dicebreaker's Tabletop Awards | Publisher of the Year | Restoration Games | |
| Dicebreaker's Tabletop Awards | Designer of the Year | David Thompson & Trevor Benjamin | |
| Dicebreaker's Tabletop Awards | Best Art | Sefirot | |
| Dicebreaker's Tabletop Awards | Best Ongoing Card Game | Disney Lorcana: The First Chapter | |
| Dicebreaker's Tabletop Awards | Best Roleplaying Game | Women Are Werewolves | |
| Dicebreaker's Tabletop Awards | Best Board Game | Sky Team | |
| Dicebreaker's Tabletop Awards | People's Choice | Fabula Ultima | |

== Deaths ==
| Date | Name | Age | Notability |
|---|---|---|---|
| January 23 | Serge Laget | 63 | French board game designer |
| February 19 | Jonathan M. Thompson | 51 | American role-playing game designer |
| March 27 | Joli Quentin Kansil | 80 | Game designer |
| April 1 | Klaus Teuber | 70 | German board game designer |
| April 21 | Ivan Moscovich | 96 | Game designer |
| May 10 | Russ Nicholson | | British fantasy illustrator |
| June 8 | Ian McGinty | 38 | American comic book writer and artist also known for artwork on Munchkin and other games |
| July | Patrick Lucien Price | | Game designer and editor at TSR |
| August 28 | Teeuwynn Woodruff | 56 | American writer and game designer |
| December 30 | Bryan Ansell | 68 | British role-playing and wargame designer and former owner of Games Workshop |
