= 2021 ENNIE Award winners =

- Awarded for: Best role-playing games of previous year
- Country: United Kingdom & United States
- Presented by: Gen Con
- First award: 2001
- Website: Archive of 2021 ENNIE Awards

The following are the winners of the 21st annual ENNIE Awards, held in 2021:

== Judges' Spotlight winners ==
- Amelia Antrim – Anyone Can Wear the Mask Author: Jeff Stormer
- Di – Righteous Blood, Ruthless Blades: Wuxia Roleplaying, Osprey Games Authors: Brendan Davis, Jeremy Bai
- Salim Hakima – Abracadabra. A Guide to Becoming a Magical Games Master, The Grinning Frog Author: Stephen Hart
- Shauna Ratliff – Altered Carbon The Role Playing Game, Hunters Entertainment Renegade Game Studios Authors: Christopher De La Rosa, Ivan Van Norman
- James Surano – SLA Industries 2nd Edition Core Rulebook, Nightfall Games Author: Dave Allsop

== List of gold and silver winners ==
Category	Gold Winner	Silver Winner
Best Adventure	OSE: Halls of the Blood King, Exalted Funeral Press Author: Diogo Nogueira	ALIEN RPG Destroyer of Worlds, Free League Publishing Author: Andrew E.C. Gaska
Best Aid/Accessory – Digital	Michael Ghelfi – RPG Ambiences & Music, Michael Ghelfi	DNGNGEN, Stockholm Kartell & Ockult Örtmästare Games
Best Aid/Accessory – Non – Digital	City of Mist Character Folio Pack, Son of Oak Game Studio	Roll & Play: The Game Master's Fantasy Toolkit, Roll & Play Press
Best Art, Cover	Vaesen – Nordic Horror Roleplaying, Free League Publishing Artist: Johan Egerkrans	Heart: The City Beneath, Rowan, Rook and Decard Artist: Felix Miall
Best Art, Interior	Vaesen – Nordic Horror Roleplaying, Free League Publishing Artist: Johan Egerkrans	Heart: The City Beneath, Rowan, Rook and Decard Artist: Felix Miall
Best Cartography	OSE: Halls of the Blood King, Exalted Funeral Press Glynn Seal	ALIEN RPG Destroyer of Worlds, Free League Publishing Christian Granath, Andrew E.C. Gaska
Best Electronic Book	Brancalonia – Spaghetti Fantasy Setting Book, Acheron Games Authors: Mauro Longo, Andrea Macchi, Max Castellani, Edoardo Cremaschi, Giovanni De Feo, Luca Mazza, Mala Spina, Alessandro Savino, Jack Sensolini, Umberto Spaticchia.	Ancestry & Culture: An Alternative to Race in 5e, Arcanist Press Author: Eugene Marshall
Best Family Game / Product	Mausritter: Boxed Set, Games Omnivorous, Losing Games Author: Isaac Williams	Tales of Xadia: The Dragon Prince Roleplaying Game – Rules Primer, Fandom, Inc. Authors: Cam Banks, Dan Telfer
Best Free Game / Product	Humblewood: The Wakewyrm's Fury, Hit Point Press Inc. Author: Andrea Bruce, Jordan Richer, Christopher Pinch, T. R. Rowe	Warhammer 40,000 Roleplay: Wrath & Glory The Graveyard Shift, Cubicle 7 Author: Robert Buckey, Zak Dale-Clutterbuck
Best Game	Alice is Missing, Hunters Entertainment, Renegade Game Studios Author: Spenser Starke	Heart: The City Beneath, Rowan, Rook and Decard Authors: Grant Howitt, Christopher Taylor
Best Layout and Design	Heart: The City Beneath, Rowan, Rook and Decard Minerva McJanda	The Stygian Library: Remastered, SoulMuppet Publishing David N. Wilkie
Best Monster/Adversary	Vaesen – Nordic Horror Roleplaying, Free League Publishing Authors: Johan Egerkrans, Nils Hintze	Heart: The City Beneath, Rowan, Rook and Decard Authors: Grant Howitt, Christopher Taylor
Best Online Content	DNGNGEN, Stockholm Kartell & Ockult Örtmästare Games	dScryb – Finely Crafted Boxed Text, dScryb
Best Organized Play	A Rough Guide to Glamour, Jonstown Compendium Authors: Chris Gidlow, Mike Hagen, Nick Brooke, Michael O’Brien, Jeff Richard, Greg Stafford	Hand of Glory, Type 40 Author: Allan Carey
Best Podcast	Asians Represent!	The Letters Page – The Sentinel Comics Podcast
Best Production Values	ALIEN RPG Destroyer of Worlds, Free League Publishing	Broken Compass: Adventure Journal, Two Little Mice
Best RPG Related Product	Worldbuilder's Notebook, Swordfish Islands Author: Jacob Hurst	Adventurers Tarot: The Empress Deck, Weird Works LLC
Best Rules	Alice is Missing, Hunters Entertainment, Renegade Game Studios Author: Spenser Starke	Cortex Prime Game Handbook, Fandom, Inc. Author: Cam Banks
Best Setting	Heart: The City Beneath, Rowan, Rook and Decard Authors: Grant Howitt, Christopher Taylor	Brancalonia – Spaghetti Fantasy Setting Book, Acheron Games Authors: Mauro Longo, Andrea Macchi, Max Castellani, Mauro Longo, Andrea Macchi, Max Castellani, Edoardo Cremaschi, Giovanni De Feo, Luca Mazza, Mala Spina, Alessandro Savino, Jack Sensolini, Umberto Spaticchia
Best Supplement	Mörk Borg CULT: Feretory, Free League Publishing Authors: Pelle Nilsson, Johan Nohr	Ancestry & Culture: An Alternative to Race in 5e, Arcanist Press Author: Eugene Marshall
Best Writing	Heart: The City Beneath, Rowan, Rook and Decard Authors: Grant Howitt, Christopher Taylor	Brancalonia – Spaghetti Fantasy Setting Book, Acheron Games Authors: Mauro Longo, Andrea Macchi, Max Castellani
Product of the Year	Alice is Missing, Hunters Entertainment, Renegade Game Studios	Brancalonia – Spaghetti Fantasy Setting Book, Acheron Games
