= 2004 ENnie Award winners =

- Awarded for: Best role-playing games of previous year
- Country: United Kingdom & United States
- Presented by: Gen Con
- First award: 2001

The following are the winners of the 4th annual ENnie Awards, held in 2004:

== List of winners ==
Category	Gold Winner	Silver Winner
Best Aid or Accessory	Roleplaying Tips GM Encyclopedia (Roleplayingtips.com)	Counter Collection Gold (Fiery Dragon Productions)
Best Art, Interior	Nocturnals: A Midnight Companion (Green Ronin Publishing)	Bestiary of Krynn (Sovereign Press)
Best Cartography	Thieves' Quarter (Green Ronin Publishing/The Game Mechanics)	Redhurst: Academy of Magic (Fast Forward Entertainment/Human Head Studios)
Best Graphic Design and Layout	Nocturnals: A Midnight Companion (Green Ronin Publishing)	Redhurst: Academy of Magic (Fast Forward Entertainment/Human Head Studios)
Best Art, Cover	Grimm (Fantasy Flight Games)	Arcana Unearthed (Malhavoc Press)
Best Official Website	Hero Games	Green Ronin Publishing
Best Publisher	Green Ronin Publishing	White Wolf
Best d20 Game	Arcana Unearthed (Malhavoc Press)	Grimm (Fantasy Flight Games)
Best Adventure	Lost City of Barakus (Troll Lord Games/Necromancer Games)	Black Sails Over Freeport (Green Ronin Publishing)
Best Campaign Setting	Dawnforge (Fantasy Flight Games)	Redhurst: Academy of Magic (Fast Forward Entertainment/Human Head Studios)
Best Setting Supplement	Crooks! (Green Ronin Publishing)	Thieves' Quarter (Green Ronin Publishing/The Game Mechanics)
Best Rules Supplement	Crime and Punishment (Atlas Games)	Torn Asunder (Bastion Press)
Best Monster Supplement	Crooks! (Green Ronin Publishing)	Bestiary of Krynn (Sovereign Press)
Best Revision, Update or Compilation	Complete Book of Eldritch Might (Malhavoc Press)	The Book of Fiends (Green Ronin Publishing)
Best Non-d20 Game	Cthulhu Dark Ages (Chaosium)	HARP (High Adventure Role Playing) (Iron Crown Enterprises)
Best Non-d20 Supplement	Fantasy Hero (Hero Games)	50 Fathoms (Pinnacle Entertainment Group)
Best Non-d20 Setting or Setting Sourcebook	The Turakian Age (Hero Games)	To Go (Unknown Armies)(Atlas Games)
Best Non-d20 Adventure	Champions Battlegrounds (Hero Games)	Shades of Black (Champions) (Hero Games)
Best Licensed Product	Nocturnals: A Midnight Companion (Green Ronin Publishing)	Babylon 5 RPG (Mongoose Publishing)
Best Electronic Product	Sidewinder: Recoiled (Dog House Rules)	Roleplaying Tips GM encyclopedia (Roleplayingtips.com)
Best Free Product or Web Enhancement	Initiative cards (The Game Mechanics)	Ezine Archives (Roleplayingtips.com)
Best Fan Site	Roleplayingtips.com	SWRPGnetwork
