= 2026 ENNIE Award winners =

Winners of the 2026 ENNIE awards

- Awarded for: Best roleplaying games of previous year
- Country: United States & United Kingdom
- Presented by: Gen Con
- First award: 2001

The following are the winners of the 26th annual ENNIE Awards, held in 2026.

== Overview ==
In 2026, the ENNIES introduced the "Best Solo Game" category.

The Crooked Moon and its publisher Avantris Entertainment won six awards in total, including "Product of the Year". The publisher Son of Oak and its Legend in the Mist game line won six awards across various categories. The publisher Darrington Press won five awards, with its Daggerheart role-playing game winning both "Best Game" and "Best Rules". Timothy Linward of Wargamer highlighted that "one in three of this year's gold prizes were awarded to two folk horror game lines, the [Dungeons & Dragons] supplement The Crooked Moon and the standalone Dolmenwood"; additional games in this genre winning resulted in the ENNIES having "a folk horror saturation level of 38%". Lin Codega of Rascal commented that "beyond the fantasy heartbreakers, a lot of smaller games and independent publishers made waves with the ENNIE voters".

== Spotlight awards ==
Judges' Spotlight Winners:

- William Beeson – Girl Frame, Anxious Mimic RPGs; Author: Isabelle M. Ruebsaat
- Hans Cummings – Trash to Treasure, Bright Bard Games; Authors: Jon Boyle and Bri De Danann
- Christopher Gath – RPG Zine Club: Year 2, Plus One Exp/Alchemical Ink
- Fiona Katherine Taylor Howat – Tacklebox, Possible Worlds Games; Authors: J. Walton and James Tadd Adcox
- Tom King – Draconis: The Call of Adventure, Studio Agate; Authors: Charlène 'Chane' Tabary and Yoan Rigot

Fan Award for Best Publisher:

- Avantris Entertainment

== List of gold and silver winners ==
| Category | Gold Winner | | Silver Winner | |
| Category | Game | Creators | Game | Creators |
|---|---|---|---|---|
| Best Adventure - Long Form | Vaesen – City of My Nightmares | Free League Publishing; Kiku Pukk Harenstam (author) | Historica Arcanum: Serenade for the Damned | Metis Creative Studio |
| Best Adventure - Short Form | Whispers of the Woods | Heltung Storytelling; Paweł Kicman (author) | The Bride of Pendle | Miskatonic Repository; Jayson Green (author) |
| Best Aid/Accessory – Digital | The Crooked Moon Alchemy VTT | Avantris Entertainment, WestMarches.games, and Grimoire AB | Pathfinder 2e and Starfinder 2e on Foundry VTT | Pocket Bard 3.0 , Pocket Bard Inc. |
| Best Aid/Accessory – Non–Digital | The Crooked Moon Tarot Card Set | Avantris Entertainment | Handouts – Ryoko's lost notes | Loot Tavern Publishing |
| Best Art, Cover | The Crooked Moon Standard Edition Hardcover | Avantris Entertainment; Xavier Collette (artist) | Historica Arcanum: Echoes of Renaissance | Metis Creative; Belgin Kaya, Yağmur Kıyak, Beliz Baytok, Usame Bakar, Alper Bıçaklar, Taha Hakan Arslan, İshak Can Altun, Celia Tang, İlker Serdar Yıldız, Ege Satırcı (artists) |
| Best Art, Interior | Legend In The Mist – Core Book | Son of Oak Game Studio; Alejandra Pinal, Mariusz Szulc, Mark Hretskyi, Zach Causey (artists) | The Field Guide to Floral Dragons Box Set | Hit Point Press; Kin Wald (artist) |
| Best Cartography | Dolmenwood Maps Book | Exalted Funeral Press; Jonathan Newell, Glynn Seal, Arlin Ortiz | Collection of Fantasy Maps II | Open Sesame Games; Guillaume Tavernier |
| Best Community Content | Triangle Agency Fan Zine | —N/a | The Bride of Pendle | Miskatonic Repository; Jayson Green (author) |
| Best Family Game / Product | Dungeons & Kittens Starter Set | Edge Studio; Clement de Ruyter, Trickytophe, Francois Cedelle, and John Grumph (authors) | Dragon Town and the Darkness Below | JP Coovert (author) |
| Best Free Game / Product | Daggerheart Quickstart Adventure: The Sablewood Messengers | Darrington Press; Spenser Starke, Rowan Hall and Mike Underwood (authors) | Legend In the Mist Learn-To-Play Comic Book Adventure | Son of Oak Game Studio LLC; Amit Moshe, Eran Aviram, Itamar Karbian, Kelly Black (authors) |
| Best Game | Daggerheart Core Set | Darrington Press; Spenser Starke, Carlos Cisco, Rowan Hall, John Harper, Matthew Mercer, Alex Uboldi, Mike Underwood, Layla Adelman, Meguey Baker, Banana Chan, Chris Davidson, Rue Dickey, Felix Isaacs, Erin Roberts, Deven Rue, Rogan Shannon, Mark Thompson, Eugenio Vargas, Chris Willett (authors) | Legend In The Mist – Core Book | Son of Oak Game Studio; Amit Moshe, Eran Aviram, Itamar Karbian, Kelly Black (authors) |
| Best Layout and Design | Warhammer: the Old World Roleplaying Game, Player’s Guide | Cubicle 7 Entertainment | Berserkr | Slightly Reckless Games |
| Best Monster/Adversary | Monsters of Drakkenheim | Ghostfire Gaming; Monty Martin, Kelly McLaughlin (authors) | Dolmenwood Monster Book | Exalted Funeral Press; Gavin Norman with Kyle Hettinger, Amelia Luke, James Spahn, Brian Yaksha (authors) |
| Best Online Content | Designing Dungeons Course: Or, How to Kill a Party in 30 Rooms or Less | Joshua McCrowell & Warren D | Solo RPG List | —N/a |
| Best Production Values | The Crooked Moon Ultimate Edition | Avantris Entertainment | Legend In the Mist – Ravenhome Slipcase | Son of Oak Game Studio LLC |
| Best RPG Related Product | Beyond the Witching Ring: Dolmenwood Soundtrack Album — 12" Vinyl LP | Exalted Funeral Press; Tales Under The Oak (music) | Menagerie of Unbearable Things | Tania Herrero |
| Best Rules | Daggerheart | Darrington Press; Spenser Starke, Carlos Cisco, Rowan Hall, John Harper, Matthew Mercer, Alex Uboldi, Mike Underwood, Layla Adelman, Meguey Baker, Banana Chan, Chris Davidson, Rue Dickey, Felix Isaacs, Erin Roberts, Deven Rue, Rogan Shannon, Mark Thompson, Eugenio Vargas, Chris Willett (authors) | Legend In The Mist – Core Book | Son of Oak Game Studio; Amit Moshe, Eran Aviram, Itamar Karbian, Kelly Black (authors) |
| Best Setting | Dolmenwood Campaign Book | Exalted Funeral Press; Gavin Norman, Chance Dudinack, Luke Gearing, Yves Geens, Noah Green, Greg Gorgonmilk, Kyle Hettinger, Clint Krause, Amelia Luke, Scott Malthouse, Jonathan Newell, Frances Northcutt Green, Amanda P., Doyle Wayne Ramos-Tavener, Glynn Seal, James Spahn, Andrew Walter, Brian Yaksha (authors) | Ryokos Guide to the Yokai Realms | Loot Tavern Publishing; Joao Araujo, William Earl, Dai Jia Rong He, Max Wartelle (authors) |
| Best Solo Game | SPINE: A Dark Solo TTRPG About Losing Yourself in a Book | Backwards Tabletop; Asa Donald, Furt the Goblin, Nala J. Wu, Holly Freiberg (contributors) | The Bonsai Diary | Sticky Doodler; Gene Koo (author) |
| Best Streaming Content | Get Your Sheet Together | Darrington Press | Cozy RPG Reviews | —N/a |
| Best Supplement | Legend In The Mist – Action Grimoire | Son of Oak Game Studio; Amit Moshe, Eran Aviram, Itamar Karbian, Kelly Black (authors) | The Painted Wastelands Player's Guide | Agamemnon Press; Tim Molloy, Christopher Willett (authors) |
| Best Writing | Making Enemies: Monster Design Inspiration for Tabletop Roleplaying Games | Gallery Books; Keith Ammann (author) | Rapscallion | Magpie Games; Whistler, Elizabeth Chaipraditkul, Brendan G. Conway, Mark Diaz Truman (authors) |
| Product of the Year | The Crooked Moon Ultimate Edition | Avantris Entertainment | Daggerheart | Darrington Press |
