= Automated Housing Referral Network =

- Type: Private
- Founded: 2004
- Website: www.ahrn.com

The Automated Housing Referral Network is a website for members of the United States Armed Forces who are looking for housing in a new location due to a permanent change of station (PCS). The site was launched in 2004 with the sponsorship of the Department of Defense (DoD). AHRN.com creates an online resource for landlords and property managers to market their available housing, while offering military members and their families direct online access to this information.

== History ==
With direction from the DoD, Runzheimer International began implementing AHRN.com at hundreds of Military Housing Offices with a beta version that launched in 2004.

The site went live in 2005 followed by the official launch in 2008. Over time, the network has added military installations in Europe and the Pacific in addition to the United States. In 2012, a mobile version of the website was launched. Resource content and ads were incorporated in early 2014.

As of December 31, 2013, AHRN.com privatized and is now AHRN, LLC owned by Runzheimer International.

== Company information ==
Landlords and property managers use the site as a direct marketing resource to reach more than 1 million military members using the site. At any given time, it contains over 800,000 listings, with 50,000 housing listings; including privatized housing in installations, community rentals, military for-sale-by-owner, roommates and temporary lodging.

AHRN.com also partnered with other military moving services, such as RallyPoint, MilitaryStorage.com (from SpareFoot) and uShip.

In March 2018, JumpCrew LLC acquired AHRN.com.
