= The Monsters Know What They're Doing =

Role-playing game supplement series by Keith Ammann

The Monsters Know What They're Doing is a book series by Keith Ammann, published by Saga Press from 2019 to 2024 and Gallery Books since 2025, consisting of unofficial supplements for fifth-edition Dungeons & Dragons.

== Contents ==
The Monsters Know What They're Doing: Combat Tactics for Dungeon Masters provides gamemasters with tactical recommendations for most of the creatures in the fifth-edition D&D Monster Manual.

== Publication history ==
The content of the initial book is based on Keith Ammann's blog of the same name, started in 2016. It was extended into a series with similar topics, with The Monsters Know What They're Doing: Combat Tactics for Dungeon Masters (2019) followed by Live to Tell the Tale: Combat Tactics for Player Characters (2020), MOAR! Monsters Know What They're Doing (2022), How to Defend Your Lair (2022) and Making Enemies: Monster Design Inspiration for Tabletop Roleplaying Games.

== Reception ==
SyFy author James Grebey called the seminal blog "a valuable resource for DMs who want to give their players a challenge and make their game feel truly immersive" and praised it for helping Dungeon Masters to "run monsters as the intelligent and exciting foes they're meant to be rather than just generic cannon fodder".

John ONeill reviewed The Monsters Know What They're Doing: Combat Tactics for Dungeon Masters for Black Gate, and stated that "To be honest, I don't know how much I'd actually use The Monsters Know What They're Doing, but it sure made fun reading."

== Awards ==
At the 2020 ENNIE Awards, The Monsters Know What They're Doing: Combat Tactics for Dungeon Masters won a Silver ENNIE for Best Writing, and Ammann's blog won the Gold ENNIE for Best Online Content.
