= The Wildsea =

Tabletop role-playing game

- Cover art by Pierre Demet
- Designers: Felix Isaacs
- Illustrators: Omercan Cirit; Pierre Demet; Shmeckerel; BlueTwoDays; Taylor Alexis; Heru Purwanda; Mon; Grumpy Anise
- Publishers: Mythworks (Note: Known as Mythopoeia until 2023.)
- Publication: 2022; 4 years ago
- Genres: Fantasy
- Systems: The Wild Words Engine

The Wildsea is a 2022 tabletop role-playing game, in which the players explore a world overgrown by an endless forest, traveling in a ship on top of the trees as though it was an ocean. The game was created by Felix Isaacs and published by RPG and comic book publisher Mythworks after a successful Kickstarter campaign in 2020.

== Setting ==
The Wildsea takes place in a post-apocalyptic fantasy world that has been overrun by rapidly-growing mile-high trees and other vegetation in an event called "the Verdancy" that occurred 300 years before the game begins, creating the eponymous Wildsea. Key to this growth is a toxic chemical called crezzerin present in the majority of the setting's flora, the mutative properties of which are responsible for creating the gargantuan trees called ironroots which form the bulk of the Wildsea itself, as well as many of the sea's playable and wildlife species, many mutated or adapted from pre-apocalyptic (pre-Verdant, or pre-V for short) species.

After the Verdancy, the world of the Wildsea bears similarities to a traditional ocean - mountains have become islands upon which port towns are built, and travel happens by way of ships that can pull or otherwise propel themselves on top of the tree canopies (such as with large mechanical chainsaw prows).

The Wildsea is made up of distinct layers, ranging from skies and the thrash at the top (upon which ships most commonly sail), to the lower and darker layers called the tangle, the sink, and the drown, with the lowest layer being the Darkness-Under-Eaves (where the roots of the massive trees and the ruins of the pre-Verdant world lie, the exact nature of which is left purposefully mysterious for players to define and discover for themselves).

In addition to islands, the sea features spits (temporary landmasses floating on the upper layers, with crowded but inherently temporary communities forming atop them), tallshanks (singular trees tall even for the Wildsea's standards, with settlements built in their branches and crowns), reefs (collections of junk floating near the top of the waves, dangerous to sail through but rich in useful salvage or home to animal dens), and rifts (massive vertical gaps in the canopy usually caused by fallen ironroot trees, leading directly down to the sea's lower layers).

The Wildsea is full of dangers to sailors - including the searing and corrupting crezzerin, the harsh and often strange weather, clouds of spores (some infectious or hallucinogenic), the four seasons (winter being especially harsh, forcing most sailors to stay at ports as the sea's branches become leafless and brittle), flora and fauna (such as beast packs, insect swarms, predatory plants, and the legendary creatures called leviathans), phenomena of the sea itself (like the turbulent rootquakes, reshaping the topology of the waves), crews of hostile pirates or cultists, or the threat of an all-consuming fire (leading to its use become a near-universal taboo). These factors and more cause most people to seek shelter away from the sea itself, in a settlement or aboard a ship.

The level of available technology on the Wildsea is very varied and inherently limited by the lack of widespread industry and prohibitions on the use of fire, making use of unorthodox and second-hand materials commonplace (blending several genre aesthetics from fantasy and post-apocalyptic fiction to solarpunk) ranging from simple weapons and tools made from wood or animal bone, to advanced ship engines, clockwork constructs with punch card programming, and gunpowder firearms. Additionally, the game deliberately chooses not to authoritatively describe the state of technology from before the Verdancy, instead giving players the flexibility in defining what lost technologies they encounter and discover.

The Wildsea is described as being a "low magic, high weirdness" setting; while it features strange beasts and spiritual entities, they are all generally connected to the tangible elements of the world (such as the mutative crezzerin, or wildlife's unusual organs). Characters can harness and leverage the uncanny properties of these setting elements to gain powerful and unusual abilities, and such practices - existing somewhere between magic and science - are referred to as arconautics.

While the specifics of the game world such as geography, settlements, and factions of nonplayer characters are left vague and meant to be defined in play to create a vision of the Wildsea unique to a given player group, the game includes a chapter on Reaches - described as "places that may or may not exist," they provide premade, not-fully-canonical regions that the wildsailors can start play in or visit during the campaign (or merely hear distant rumors of), many of which go against some of the wider setting's existing conventions and introduce their own local assumptions (such as the Icterine, a former desert which features massive cacti instead of trees, or Prophet's Fall, which features a much higher level of technological advancement).

=== Bloodlines ===
An example crew of a Wildsea ship, showcasing the game's playable species. From left to right: an ardent, an ektus, a gau, a tzelicrae, an ironbound, a ketra, a mothryn.

Several sapient playable species (called bloodlines in the game) inhabit the world of the Wildsea, some having existed since before the Verdancy and others a direct or indirect byproduct of it. The most common seven include:

- Ardent, direct descendants of pre-Verdancy humankind, noted for their endurance and bearing strong connections to the world's spectral realm (such as the spirits of their ancestors)
- Ektus, tall and long-lived humanoid cacti, whose ancient desert homeland was swallowed by the trees
- Gau, anthropomorphic fungal organisms, leaving the darkness of their mushroom homes to explore the world
- Tzelicrae, hiveminds of spiders who construct bodies for themselves out of silk and discarded salvage, or take on appearances of the other bloodlines by animating and inhabiting dead (or in some cases, stolen) bodies
- Ironbound, souls of shipwrecks or machines in bodies of mechanical scrap, often mistaken for robotic automatons
- Ketra, humans who were trapped in crezzerin-infused caves and mines, emerging from the depths with translucent, mollusc-like bodies reinforced with artificial skeletons
- Mothryn, humanoid moths with mostly nonfunctional wings, short-lived but capable of partially resetting their lifespan, memories, and personality through a process called repupation

== Gameplay ==
Players in The Wildsea take on the roles of a group of seafarers called wildsailors, traveling across the Wildsea in a ship of their own design, their activities and goals defined by the player's choices in building both their characters and their ship (but often include salvaging wrecks and ruins, hunting the sea's strange beasts, trading and transporting cargo or passengers, or delving into the sea's histories and mysteries).

Character creation involves choosing a bloodline (their species and physical makeup), an origin (describing the wildsailor's upbringing or significant experience, such as being born to a family of 'rootless' wanderers, or dying and arising as an 'anchored' spirit), and a post (indicating their job aboard the crew's ship, such as that of a corsair, a navigator, or an alchemist). Based on these choices (though not being strictly limited by them like in class-based RPGs), players choose their characters' edges (broad approaches to problem-solving, such as the intellectual Sharps or the stoic Iron), skills and languages (the latter of which include both natural ones such as Saprekk spoken by the ektus, as well as artificial languages like the highly-clipped Brasstongue used by merchants and grifters), starting resources, drives and mires (which narratively describe what the sailors want to accomplish and how they react to the horrors they encounter while adventuring, respectively), and lastly aspects - special abilities that define the characters' unique capabilities (such as the traits of their innate biology or past training, signature pieces of gear, or companions under their command).

Building the crew's ship is a collaborative process, and involves spending a shared resource called stakes - the whole group starts with a number of collective stakes, and each player gets a few to themselves (allowing them to get a particular ship upgrade they desire, or pool points together with the other players). As the players spend these stakes, they both upgrade the ship's mechanical statistics called ratings (such as its Armour, Speed, or Stealth) and give it unique narrative and mechanical capabilities. The ship must include at least one of each required design components (like its size, hull, or engine), while the other stakes can be spent on options such as specialized rooms (like a galley or medical bay), deckside weapons, support vessels called outriders, or supporting NPCs in the form of undercrew (including individual officers and gangs that consist of several members).

During play, when characters attempt something that is difficult, dramatic, or dangerous, they make a roll using a pool of six-sided dice (built using a combination of their attributes, aspects, and situational advantages), the results of which may be a successful Triumph, a mixed Conflict, or fail in a Disaster. If multiple dice in the pool show the same result (called doubles), a Twist occurs, a small change in the game world concurrent with the main outcome of the action, collaboratively defined by the entire play group.

Tracks (visualized as chains of linked boxes or circles) are used to indicate progress on longer-term actions or as countdowns to upcoming events, being marked or cleared in response to player action and events in the game world (commonly likened to the progress clock mechanics in games such as Blades in the Dark, but ultimately inspired by Fallen London). Actions that are particularly difficult or involve a narratively suboptimal approach force the player to take Cut, removing one or more of the dice in their result pool (starting with the highest), which may downgrade their result or lower the possibility of a Twist occurring. Most Cut is applied by the Firefly, but players can voluntarily risk Cut on their own actions to increase their impact or to take precise aim at a creature's weak point or organ.

Characters can obtain and make use of several kinds of resources, spending them to boost their actions or create temporary gear or enhancing food - salvage (inorganic components like mechanical scrap and old-world treasure), specimens (organic items like fruits and animal parts), charts (maps and other documents recording navigational information), and whispers (supernaturally parasitic phrases that burrow themselves in the minds of creatures, which can be spoken or shouted to alter the world in ways similar to spells of more traditional fantasy roleplaying games).

Gameplay in The Wildsea shifts between scenes (covering tense moments of combat, exploration, or social interaction), montages (which cover larger spans of time, allowing for activities like crafting, acquiring resources, or recovering from injury), and journeys (where the crew boards their ship and sails towards a new destination, overcoming challenges and engaging in encounters along the way).

When characters suffer damage from enemies or environmental obstacles (generally called hazards), they have to mark a number of boxes on their aspects, which might make them unavailable for use if all boxes are marked, requiring the character to spend time and resources during montages to make the aspects usable again. They can also choose to take an injury instead, which acts as a negative aspect, inhibiting the character in some way (which can range from a broken limb to a supernatural disease with a unique effect) until they recover. Additionally, witnessing or being forced to do terrible things (such as engaging in cannibalism, or encountering a leviathan creature) may force the player to mark one of their mires, bringing out one of the character's negative habits (forcing them to take Cut on actions that contradict their active mires) until they are able to relax in safety. Despite all the damage a wildsailor might struggle with, character death in The Wildsea is a narrative event, not a mechanical one - it is entirely up to a player to decide if and when their character should die and be retired from play.

Character advancement is handled by achieving and recording narrative milestones (minor ones that can be gained roughly once per session, or major ones granted by completing multi-session story arcs), whether those in accordance with the wildsailors' personal drives, or handed out by the Firefly based on the group's accomplishments, which are then used to gain new skill and language ranks and to gain new aspects (or combine existing ones), while the crew's ship can be upgraded by trading in cargo (resources far too large for individual characters to carry, like crates or precious furniture) at workshops and shipyards in port.

== Influences ==
The game was influenced by video games such Bastion, Fallen London (and other games set in its fictional universe); tabletop roleplaying games such as Heart: The City Beneath, Blades in the Dark, and Belly of the Beast; as by new weird fiction like China Miéville's Bas-Lag series.

== Publication history ==
The Wildsea was originally made available as a series of free quickstart documents in 2020, before a Kickstarter campaign to fund the development of the core rulebook launched later that year. With an original goal was $15,000, the project raised $135,840 from 2,692 backers over the course of the month, reaching stretch goals that included full color artwork, professional layout, additional setting material and player options, a commissioned soundtrack, and a system reference document and third-party creator license for the game's Wild Words ruleset.

=== Supplements ===
- Storm & Root (a rules and setting expansion focused on exploration of the skies in airships, and on traveling through the Wildsea's depths in submersible vessels; originally released in January 2024)
- Ship-Gardens (a small supplement adding a gardening subsystem and plants that characters can cultivate and hybridize on their ship; originally released in January 2024)
- One-Armed Scissor (a narrative scenario acting as an introduction to the game, available both for free and with a paid version with additional material; free version released in September 2023, enhanced version in February 2024)
- Red Right Hand (a narrative scenario aimed at more experienced players and characters; originally released in January 2024)

== Told by Wild Words ==
The game's own underlying ruleset, the Wild Words Engine, has also been used in other games under the label of "Told By Wild Words" and a Creative Commons license (analogous to similar design movements such as Powered by the Apocalypse and Forged in the Dark), such as Far Field (an exploration-focused spinoff of Lancer).

== Reception ==
In 2023, The Wildsea was the Silver Winner of an ENNIE Award for Best Writing. It was also one of the 20 winners of The Awards that year.

In his 2023 review, Dave Thaumavore called the game "one of the most original, mechanically interesting and well-laid out games [he's] ever come across" and "almost unbelievably illustrated" with its "evocative art that sells the setting completely".

Writing for Polygon, Connie Chang said that The Wildsea's "beautifully illustrated rulebook not only allowed me to add my own twists, but actively endorsed it, with multiple sections dedicated to alternate ways of running encounters and ideas for creating your own unique lore."

Rob Wieland for Forbes notes The Wildsea does "a great job hitting a very tough target with its world building. There are fascinating concepts like characters that are walking spider hives and details like what people eat in the world but still leave room for gaming groups to make their own decisions. It’s an amazing fantasy world that does a lot without resorting to explaining the differences through magic."

In his 2024 review of the game, Quintin Smith described The Wildsea as "taking the genre of fantasy and then ripping out all the tropes" and letting the players "experience awe and wonder all over again," praising its unique worldbuilding, tone, artwork, writing, layout, and rules (though criticizing the game's ship traveling system and the mechanics for healing).

Since its publication, the game has influenced several other tabletop roleplaying games - the authors of Daggerheart gave it a "special appreciation," crediting The Wildsea's format of Reaches as influencing Daggerheart's own section of Campaign Frames, as well as giving partial inspiration to the Natural Fantasy supplement for Fabula Ultima.
