= 2024 ENNIE Award winners =

Winners of the 2024 ENNIE awards

- Awarded for: Best role-playing games of previous year
- Country: United Kingdom & United States
- Presented by: Gen Con
- First award: 2001

The following are the winners of the 24th annual ENNIE Awards, held in 2024.

== Spotlight awards ==
Judges' Spotlight Winners:

- Joe Blankenship – The Wassailing of Claus Manor, Clear Keep & Plus One EXP; Author: Mike Martens, Michael Van Vleet, Brian Sago
- James Surano – Essence 20 Roleplaying System Field Guide to Action and Adventure Crossover Sourcebook Power Rangers G.I. JOE Transformers, Renegade Game Studios; Authors: Ryan Costello, Ben Heisler, Ginny Loveday, Bryan C.P. Steele
- Amelia Antrim – OBSCURE: Found Footage Inspired Horror TTRPG, Sunzenaut; Author: Tommy Sunzenauer
- Tom King – Gods of the Forbidden North: Volume 1, Pulp Hummock Press; Authors: Robert Alderman, Chris Cotgrove, The Scrying Dutchman, Joel Hines
- Shauna Ratliff – CHEW: The Roleplaying Game, Imagining Games; Authors: Pete Petrusha, Justin Forest, Justin Ford, Steve Dee, Joseph Weaver

== List of gold and silver winners ==
Category	Gold Winner	Silver Winner
Best Adventure – Long Form	Delta Green: God’s Teeth, Arc Dream Publishing; Author: Caleb Stokes	Call of Cthulhu: Alone Against the Static, Chaosium Inc.; Author: B.W. Holland
Best Adventure – Short Form	Eat the Reich, Rowan, Rook and Decard; Author: Grant Howitt	One-Shot Wonders, Roll & Play Press; Authors: Sam Bartlett, Beth Davies, Destiny Howell
Best Aid/Accessory – Digital	LegendKeeper, LegendKeeper / Algorific LLC	HEXROLL 2E, Pen, Dice & Paper
Best Aid/Accessory – Non – Digital	Arkham Investigator’s Wallet, H.P. Lovecraft Historical Society	Hexcrawl Toolbox, Games Omnivorous
Best Art, Cover	Eat the Reich, Rowan, Rook and Decard; Artist: Will Kirkby	Koriko: A Magical Year, Mousehole Press; Artist: Deb JJ Lee
Best Art, Interior	Eat the Reich, Rowan, Rook and Decard; Artist: Will Kirkby	Ultraviolet Grasslands 2E, Exalted Funeral Press; Artist: Luka Rejec
Best Cartography	Dragonbane Core Set, Free League Publishing; Francesca Baerald, Niklas Brandt	ALIEN RPG – Building Better Worlds, Free League Publishing; Stefan Isberg, Christian Granath, Dave Semark, Clara Fei-Fei Carija
Best Community Content	Call of Cthulhu: Los Hobos and the Wolves of Carcosa, Critical Hit Publishing (Miskatonic Repository); Author: Alex Guillotte	The Well of All Fear (Miskatonic Repository); Author: Kat Clay
Best Family Game / Product	BREAK!! Tabletop RPG, Grey Wizard Press & Naldobean Games; Authors: Grey Wizard, Reynaldo Madriñan	If I Were a Lich, Man, Hit Point Press; Author: Lucian Kahn
Best Free Game / Product	Rivers of London: The Domestic, Chaosium, Inc.; Authors: Gavin Inglis, Lynne Hardy	Level 1 The Free RPG Day Indie RPG Anthology 2023, 9th Level Games; Author: Mark Kennedy, Dustin Blottenberger, KJ Lappin, CJ Lappin, M. Belanger, Rue Dickey, Nat Mesnard, Gabrielle Rabinowitz, Noah Lemelson, H. L. Black, Brigitte Winter, Sylvia Gimenez, Zak Eidsvoog, Ian Rickett, Goat Song Publishing, Helena Real
Best Game	Shadowdark RPG, The Arcane Library; Author: Kelsey Dionne; Art: Lucas Korte, Brandish Gilhelm, Jessee Egan, Yuri Perkowski Domingos, Matt Morrow, Matt Ray, Mark Lyons, Abdul Latif; Layout/Design: Kelsey Dionne	Outgunned, Two Little Mice; Authors: Riccardo “Rico” Sirignano, Simone Formicola; Art: Daniela Giubellini; Editing: Simone Formicola, John Marron; Layout/Design: Luca Carbone, Sabrina Ceccon
Best Layout and Design	Shadowdark RPG, The Arcane Library; Kelsey Dionne; Layout/Design: Luca Carbone, Sabrina Ceccon	CBR+PNK: Augmented, Mythworks; Emanoel Melo, Raul Rinaldi
Best Monster/Adversary	(Tie): MONSTROUS, Cloud Curio; Authors: Kyle Latino, Kenny Webb; Art: Kyle Latino; Warhammer 40,000 Wrath & Glory Threat Assessment Xenos, Cubicle 7 Entertainment Ltd; Authors: Christopher Colston, Michael Duxbury, Chris Edwards, Chris Handley, Travis Legge, Ciarán O’Brien, Sven Truckenbrodt; Art: LJ Koh, Sam Manley, JG O’Donoghue, Stefan ‘Storykillinger’ Ristik, and Michael Savier	
Best Online Content	Alexandrian, Dream Machine Productions	Dave Thaumavore RPG Reviews
Best Production Values	Arkham Investigator’s Wallet, H.P. Lovecraft Historical Society	Koriko: A Magical Year, Mousehole Press
Best RPG Related Product	So You Want to Be a Game Master: Everything You Need to Start Your Tabletop Adventure for Dungeons and Dragons, Pathfinder, and Other Systems, Page Street Publishing Co.; Author: Justin Alexander	KOBOLD Guide to Roleplaying, Kobold Press; Authors: Keith Ammann, Ginny Di, Clint McElroy, Erin Roberts, Michael E. Shea, Gail Simon, B. Dave Walters, Bryan Camp, Luke Hart, Chris Kluwe, Christopher M. Cevasco, Sage Stafford, Basheer Ghouse, Shanna Germain, Shareff Jackson, Luke Gygax, Rajan Khanna, Curtis C Chen, Sharang Biswas, Scott Lynch, Robert Mason, John Joseph Adams
Best Rules	Shadowdark RPG, The Arcane Library; Author: Kelsey Dionne	Pathfinder Player Core, Paizo Inc; Authors: Alexander Augunas, Kate Baker, Logan Bonner, Jason Bulmahn, Carlos Cabrera, Calder CaDavid, James Case, Adam Daigle, Eleanor Ferron, Steven Hammond (II), Joan Hong, Vanessa Hoskins, James Jacobs, Jenny Jarzabski, Jason Keeley, Erik Keith, Dustin Knight, Lyz Liddell, Luis Loza, Erik Mona, Patchen Mortimer, Dennis Muldoon, Stephen Radney-MacFarland, Mikhail Rekun, David N. Ross, Michael Sayre, Mark Seifter, Kendra Leigh Speedling, Mark Thompson, Clark Valentine, Andrew White, Landon J. Winkler, Linda Zayas-Palmer
Best Setting	Pathfinder Lost Omens: Tian Xia World Guide, Paizo Inc; Authors: Eren Ahn, Jeremy Blum, Alyx Bui, James Case, Banana Chan, Connie Chang, Rick Chia, Hans Chun, Theta Chun, Hiromi Cota, Dana Ebert, Basheer Ghouse, John Godek III, Sen H.H.S., Joan Hong, Michelle Jones, Joshua Kim, Daniel Kwan, Dash Kwiatkowski, Jacky Leung, Jesse J. Leung, Monte Lin, Jessie “Aki” Lo, Luis Loza, Adam Ma, Liane Merciel, Ashley Moni, Kevin Thien Vu Long Nguyen, Andrew Quon, Danita Rambo, K Arsenault Rivera, Christopher Rondeau, Joaquin Kyle “Makapatag” Saavedra, Kienna Shaw, Philip Shen, Tan Shao Han, Mari Tokuda, Ruvaid Virk, Viditya Voleti, Grady Wang, Emma Yasui, and Jay Zhang	The Valley of Flowers, Phantom Mill Games; Authors: Jedediah Berry, Andrew McAlpine
Best Streaming Content	The Party, Swiss Squared	William Bailey's Haunted Mansion; A Call of Cthulhu Adventure.- Ballarat Heritage Festival 2024, Tales from Rat City
Best Supplement	ALIEN RPG – Building Better Worlds, Free League Publishing; Authors: Andrew E.C. Gaska, Dave Semark	The Griffon’s Saddlebag – Book Two, Hit Point Press; Authors: Griffin Macaulay, Willow Christensen
Best Writing	Call of Cthulhu: Alone Against the Static, Chaosium Inc.; Author: B.W. Holland; Editing: James Coquillat & Mike Mason	Cloud Empress: Land of Cicadas, worlds by watt; Author: watt; Editing: Roz Leahy
Product of the Year	Shadowdark RPG, The Arcane Library	Outgunned, Two Little Mice
