= 2007 ENnie Award winners =

- Awarded for: Best role-playing games of previous year
- Country: United Kingdom & United States
- Presented by: Gen Con
- First award: 2001

The following are the winners of the 7th annual ENnie Awards, held in 2007:

== List of winners ==
Category	Gold Winner	Silver Winner
Best Cover Art	Five Fingers, Port of Deceit by Privateer Press	Hollow Earth Expedition by Exile Games Studio
Best Interior Art	M&M Ultimate Power by Green Ronin Publishing	Qin by Seventh Circle Company
Best Production Values	Ptolus, City by the Spire by Malhavoc Press/White Wolf	M&M Ultimate Power by Green Ronin Publishing
Best Writing	Five Fingers, Port of Deceit by Privateer Press	WFRP Children of the Horned Rat by Black Industries
Best Rules	M&M Ultimate Power by Green Ronin	Spirit of the Century by Evil Hat Productions
Best Cartography	Ptolus, City by the Spire by Malhavoc Press	WFRP GM Toolkit by Black Industries
Best Miniature Product	Game Mastery: Flip-mat Tavern by Paizo Publishing	EZ Dungeons by Fat Dragon Games
Best Adventure	WFRP: Lure of the Liche Lord by Black Industries	M&M Time of Vengeance by Green Ronin Publishing
Best Regalia	Order of the Stick, No Cure for the Paladin Blues by Giant in the Playground	Liber Chaotica by Black Library
Best Setting	Ptolus, City by the Spire by Malhavoc Press/White Wolf	Five Fingers, Port of Deceit by Privateer Press
Best Supplement	WFRP Companion by Black Industries	M&M Ultimate Powe, by Green Ronin Publishing
Best Aid or Accessory	Deck of Many Things by Green Ronin Publishing	GameMastery Combat Pad by Open Mind Games/Paizo
Best Fan Site	Dragonlance Nexus	Planewalker
Best Podcast	Have Games, Will Travel	Yog Radio
Best Free Product or Web-Enhancement	Savage Tide Player's Guide by Paizo Publishing	Classic Battletech Free Package by Catalyst Games
Best Electronic Book	Classic Battletech Free Package by Catalyst Games	Magical Medieval Society: European Warfare by Expeditious Retreat Press
Best Game	Scion, Hero by White Wolf Publishing	Qin by Seventh Circle Company
Best d20/OGL Product	Mutants and Masterminds, Ultimate Power by Green Ronin Publishing	Five Fingers, Port of Deceit by Privateer Press
Product of the Year	Ptolus, City by the Spire by Malhavoc Press/White Wolf	WFRP, Children of the Horned Rat by Black Industries
Fan's Choice Best Publisher	Wizards of the Coast	Green Ronin Publishing
