= City of Mist =

Tabletop role-playing game

- Designers: Amít Moshe
- Publishers: Son of Oak Game Studio, Modiphius Entertainment
- Publication: 2017; 9 years ago
- Genres: Urban fantasy; Neo-noir
- Website: cityofmist.co/en-eu

City of Mist is an urban fantasy neo-noir detective tabletop role-playing game (RPG) designed by Amít Moshe and published by Son of Oak Game Studio. The game is set in a modern-day metropolis where ordinary people of all walks of life become modern-day reincarnations of myths, legends, or fairy tales, gaining magical powers and abilities.

The game's narrative driven engine is partially based on the Powered by the Apocalypse game engine and the tag system featured in free RPG Lady Blackbird. The cinematic tone of the game is inspired by film noir and detective graphic novels as well as street-level detective superhero TV shows.

== Publication history ==
Crowdfunding for the original game was launched on Kickstarter in 2016 which generated 1,762 backers, raising $104,313, or nearly $90,000 over its original $14,000 goal. It was then released in 2017. Amit Moshe was inspired to design City of Mist after writing a modern retelling of Cú Chulainn. In 2018, the game was picked up by publishing partner Modiphius Entertainment.

The original release contained the rules in a single core book. A subsequent 2019 release reorganized the rules into two separate rulebooks, the Player's Guide and the Master of Ceremonies' Toolkit, in an effort to make the game's literature less "daunting for new players" and "more accessible to everyone." A second Kickstarter was launched in 2019 for a new City of Mist Starter Box which was then released as a standalone product in November 2020. In 2020, support for running the game on Roll20 was released along with an online organized play program.

== Game system ==
In City of Mist's character creation process, characters are described using exclusively words ("tags") – the game has no statistics or numerical values of any kind. "Player characters are people called 'Rifts,' who can draw on the powers of mythical heroes and creatures to fight enemies and solve paranormal mysteries".

The action resolution system in City of Mist is a heavily modified version of the Apocalypse World game engine. Player characters utilize specific "Moves" which can be "augmented by their themes and tags, to try to accomplish their goals"; players roll 2d6 to resolve these "Moves".

The game uses two types of character development systems side by side. Gaining Attention points allows players to add power tags and unlock theme improvements similar to gaining experience points in other systems. The more substantial character development mechanic focuses on the pull between the mundane and the mythical.

== Related works ==
Moshe and Son of Oak game studio used the Mist Engine as the foundational game mechanics for Queerz! TTRPG, Legend in the Mist, and Otherscape.

== Reception ==
Geek & Sundry said of City of Mist, "The mechanics are simple yet INCREDIBLY robust" and the game featured in Geek & Sundry's December 2017 RPG Buyer's Guide and 2018 Best Role-Playing Games. Joshua Nelson, for Bleeding Cool, wrote that the game "hits me with the classic noir-mystery tropes. [...] City Of Mist is all about a world inhabited by legendary figures – think King Arthur or the biblical Job, or even Little Red Riding Hood – who have been affected by an arcane force of nature of sorts, called The Mist, that makes them live a more mundane life than this. It's rather like The Matrix's namesake meets Once Upon A Time, perhaps. Regardless of its inspiration, City Of Mist deals with a handful of these myths and legends contending with both their roles in their stories and the humdrum of everyday living. I'm game for this".

Giaco Furino, for TechRaptor, highlighted that "City of Mist takes an incredible idea and gives it player agency in its setting and gameplay. I really like the way the real world and the magical world are sort of tethered to each other, and playing the game means paying attention to both. You can’t just go swinging Excalibur around all day, you’ve also got to make rent, and figure out what happened to that kidnapped kid, and call your mom for her birthday. If you like that sort of tension between the modern world and the mystical, then this game is absolutely going to hit the mark for you".

Richard Jansen-Parkes, for the UK print magazine Tabletop Gaming, wrote that "style and drama ooze from every page of this beautiful book. It takes a little more effort to crack than most story-driven games, but when things click it offers something truly special." Tomás Giménez Rioja, for Tribality, highlighted that "some mechanics [...] could need some improvements but are good enough to make the game, if played correctly, a very fun game."

Alex Meehan for Dicebreaker named City of Mist one of the best tabletop role-playing games to play in 2024.

=== Awards and nominations ===
Year	Award	Category	Work	Result	Ref.
2017	ENNIE Awards	Best Free Game	Starter Set	Silver Award	
2018	ENNIE Awards	Best Interior Art	Core Book	Gold Award	
2021	ENNIE Awards	Best Aid/Accessory (Non-Digital)	City of Mist Character Folio Pack	Gold Award	
2022	ENNIE Awards	Best Aid/Accessory (Non-Digital)	City of Mist: Crime Board Map	Nominated	
2022	ENNIE Awards	Best Cartography	City of Mist: Crime Board Map	Nominated	
2022	ENNIE Awards	Best Supplement	City of Mist: Shadows & Showdowns	Nominated	
2024	Graal d'Or	JDR International	NA	Winner	
2024	Grog d'Or	NA	NA	Gold Award	

== Books and supplements ==
=== Core Books ===
- City of Mist: Quick Start Rules – free PDF with the basic rules, seven pre-generated characters, and two starting case scenarios: V is for Going Viral and Demons in Cross End
- City of Mist Player's Guide (2019, ISBN 9789659258741) – setting introduction and description of the ruleset, character creation, and character evolution
- City of Mist Master of Ceremonies' Toolkit (2019, ISBN 9789659258758) – contains guides for running the game and writing cases, a bestiary of crooks and villains, and the sample case scenario Gambling with Death

=== Supplements ===
- City of Mist Starter Box (2020) – box set which includes the basic rules for both players and game masters, the Shark Tank case scenario, and additional accessories such as five pre-generated player character folios and dice
- City of Mist Shadows and Showdowns (2020) – an expansion to the core rule system, story mechanics, and the game's canon
- City of Mist Nights of Payne Town (2020) – an extensive story arc split up into ten related case scenarios

=== Accessories ===
- City of Mist Character Folio Pack (2021) – fourteen pre-generated player character folios; includes the seven original starter set characters and seven new characters along with a rules summary on each folio

=== Out of print ===
- Starter Set – free PDF with the basic rules
- City of Mist Core Book (2017, ISBN 9789659258710) – the original version of the game; both core books in a single 512-page volume
