= 2014 ENnie Award winners =

- Awarded for: Best role-playing games of previous year
- Country: United Kingdom & United States
- Presented by: Gen Con
- First award: 2001
- Website: Archive of 2014 ENNIE Awards

The following are the winners of the 14th annual ENnie Awards, held in 2014:

== Judges' Spotlight Winners ==
- Hooper: Hobomancer Companion – Hex Games
- Kayra Keri Kupcu: Deep Magic – Kobold Press
- Stacy Muth: Rocket Age RPG – Cubicle 7 Entertainment
- Jakub Nowosad: The Demolished Ones – Chronicle City/Rite Publishing
- Kurt Wiegel: Weird Wars Rome – Pinnacle Entertainment Group

== List of gold and silver winners ==
Category	Gold Winner	Silver Winner
Best Adventure	Trail of Cthulhu: Eternal Lies – Pelgrane Press	Razor Coast: Heart of the Razor – Frog God Games
Best Aid/Accessory	Numenera Creature Deck – Monte Cook Games, LLC	Fate Dice – Eldritch Dice – Evil Hat Productions
Best Art, Interior	Pathfinder Campaign Setting: Inner Sea Gods – Paizo Publishing	Numenera Corebook – Monte Cook Games, LLC
Best Art, Cover	Pathfinder Roleplaying Game: Mythic Adventures – Paizo Publishing	Achtung! Cthulhu – Keeper's Guide to the Secret War – Modiphius
Best Blog	Gnome Stew	AaWBlog (Adventureaweek.com)
Best Cartography	Pathfinder Campaign Setting: Wrath of the Righteous Poster Map Folio – Paizo Publishing	Numenera Corebook – Monte Cook Games, LLC
Best Electronic Book	Player's Guide to Emerald City – Green Ronin Publishing	Broken Earth (Savage Worlds) – Sneak Attack Press
Best Family Game	Fate Accelerated Edition – Evil Hat Productions	Hobbit Tales from the Green Dragon Inn – Cubicle 7 Entertainment
Best Free Product	Pathfinder Module: We Be Goblins Too! – Paizo Publishing	Call of Cthulhu 7th Edition Quickstart – Chaosium Inc.
Best Game	Fate Core System – Evil Hat Productions	Numenera Corebook – Monte Cook Games, LLC
Best Miniatures Product	Pathfinder Battles: Wrath of the Righteous – WizKids Games/NECA	Pathfinder Battles: Wrath of the Righteous Gargantuan Demon Lord Deskari – WizKids Games/NECA
Best Monster/Adversary	Pathfinder Roleplaying Game: Bestiary 4 – Paizo Publishing	The Ninth World Bestiary – Monte Cook, LLC
Best Podcast	Ken and Robin Talk About Stuff	Numenera: The Signal
Best Production Values	Numenera Corebook – Monte Cook Games, LLC	Trail of Cthulhu: Eternal Lies – Pelgrane Press
Best RPG Related Product	Pathfinder Adventure Card Game: Rise of the Runelords Base Set – Paizo Publishing	Strange Tales of the Century – Evil Hat Productions
Best Rules	Fate Core System – Evil Hat Productions	13th Age – Pelgrane Press
Best Setting	Numenera Corebook – Monte Cook Games, LLC	Deadlands Noir – Pinnacle Entertainment Group
Best Supplement	Pathfinder Roleplaying Game: Ultimate Campaign – Paizo Publishing	Fate System Toolkit – Evil Hat Productions
Best Software	Roll20 – The Orr Group LLC	Realm Works – Lone Wolf Development
Best Writing	Numenera Corebook – Monte Cook Games, LLC	Achtung! Cthulhu – Keeper's Guide to the Secret War – Modiphius
Best Website	RPG Geek	Fate SRD
Product of the Year	Numenera Corebook – Monte Cook Games, LLC	Fate Core System – Evil Hat Productions
