= 2011 ENnie Award winners =

- Awarded for: Best role-playing games of previous year
- Country: United Kingdom & United States
- Presented by: Gen Con
- First award: 2001
- Website: Archive of 2011 ENNIE Awards

The following are the winners of the 11th annual ENnie Awards, held in 2011.

== Spotlight winners ==
Judges' Spotlight Winners:

- Eat and Run (Brainpan Games)
- Fortune's Fool (Pantheon Press)
- Outbreak: Undead (Hunters Books)
- Smallville Roleplaying Game (Margaret Weis Productions)
- Wayfinder #4: The Mwangi Expanse (Paizo Fans United)

== List of gold and silver winners ==
Category	Gold Winner	Silver Winner
Best Adventure	Pathfinder Adventure Path #43: The Haunting of Harrowstone (Paizo Publishing)	Delta Green: Targets of Opportunity (Arc Dream Publishing/Pagan Publishing)
Best Aid/Accessory	Hero Lab (Lone Wolf Development)	D&D Essentials: Dungeon Tiles Master Set – The Dungeon (Wizards of the Coast)
Best Art, Cover	A Song of Ice and Fire Campaign Guide (Green Ronin Publishing)	Shadowrun: Attitude (Catalyst Game Labs)
Best Art, Interior	Pathfinder Campaign Setting: Inner Sea World Guide (Paizo Publishing)	DC Adventures Hero's Handbook (Green Ronin Publishing)
Best Blog	Critical Hits	Gnome Stew
Best Cartography	Pathfinder Campaign Setting: Inner Sea Poster Map Folio (Paizo Publishing)	Bookhounds of London (Pelgrane Press)
Best Electronic Book	Continuity (Posthuman Studios)	Shanghai Vampocalypse (Savage Mojo)
Best Free Product	Old School Hack – Basic Game (Kirin Robinson)	A Time of War: The BattleTech RPG Quick-Start Rules (Catalyst Game Labs)
Best Game	The Dresden Files RPG (Evil Hat Productions )	Mutants & Masterminds Hero's Handbook (Green Ronin Publishing)
Best Miniatures Product	Mousling Heroes (Reaper Miniatures)	BattleTech 25th Anniversary Introductory Boxed Set (Catalyst Game Labs)
Best Monster/Adversary	Pathfinder Roleplaying Game: Bestiary 2 (Paizo Publishing)	Monster Vault (Wizards of the Coast)
Best New Game (published for the first time ever)	The Dresden Files RPG (Evil Hat Productions)	The Laundry (Cubicle 7)
Best Podcast	Yog-Sothoth	Chronicles: Pathfinder Podcast
Best Production Values	Pathfinder Roleplaying Game: Bestiary 2 (Paizo Publishing)	The Dresden Files RPG (Evil Hat Productions)
Best RPG Related Product	Castle Ravenloft Boardgame (Wizards of the Coast)	BattleTech 25th Anniversary Introductory Boxed Set (Catalyst Game Labs)
Best Rules	The Dresden Files RPG (Evil Hat Productions)	D&D Rules Compendium (Wizards of the Coast)
Best Setting	Pathfinder Campaign Setting: Inner Sea World Guide (Paizo Publishing)	Dark Sun Campaign Setting (Wizards of the Coast)
Best Supplement	Pathfinder Roleplaying Game: Advanced Player's Guide (Paizo Publishing)	Space 1889: Red Sands (Savage Worlds) (Pinnacle Entertainment Group)
Best Website	Obsidian Portal	d20pfsrd.com
Best Writing	The Dresden Files RPG (Evil Hat Productions)	Delta Green: Targets of Opportunity (Arc Dream Publishing/Pagan Publishing)
Product of the Year	Pathfinder Roleplaying Game: Advanced Player's Guide (Paizo Publishing)	The Dresden Files RPG (Evil Hat Productions)
