= Vaesen =

Vaesen may refer to:

- Vaesen (role-playing game), a tabletop role-playing game
- Väsen, a Swedish folk music band
