= Silverton Partners =

Private American venture capital firm

- Type: Private
- Genre: Venture Capital, startups
- Founded: 2005
- Headquarters: Austin, Texas, USA
- Key people: Morgan Flager; Kip McClanahan; Mike Dodd; Roger Chen
- Website: silvertonpartners.com

Silverton Partners is an early-stage venture capital firm headquartered in Austin, Texas.

Founded in 2006, Silverton Partners focuses on the Seed and Series A rounds of a startup's lifecycle across a variety of industries including enterprise SaaS, cybersecurity, consumer marketplaces, financial services, insurance, real estate technologies, digital healthcare, etc.

== History ==
Silverton Partners was founded by Bill Wood, a founder of Austin Ventures, in 2005. After initially operating as a family office, Silverton Partners launched Fund III as an institutional fund with $75 million in 2006, Fund IV with $75 million in 2013, and Fund V with $108 million in 2018.

The firm is led by Managing Partner, Morgan Flager, and Partners, Kip McClanahan, Mike Dodd, and Roger Chen.

== Portfolio ==
Among Silverton’s early-stage investments are:

- Convey
- Convio
- Silicon Laboratories
- SpareFoot
- The Zebra
- Tivoli Software
- uShip
- WP Engine
- Dappier
