= Torn Asunder: Critical Hits =

2003 Role-playing game supplement

Torn Asunder: Critical Hits is a 2003 role-playing game supplement for the d20 System published by Bastion Press.

== Contents ==
Torn Asunder: Critical Hits is a supplement in which a gritty, anatomy‑based critical injury system is introduced, complete with detailed wound effects, expanded healing options, new classes, spells, items, monsters, and gear—offering an alternative to simple bonus damage.

== Reception ==
Torn Asunder won the 2004 Silver ENnie Award for "Best Rules Supplement".

== Reviews ==
- Pyramid
- Fictional Reality (Issue 13 - Sep 2003)
- Legions Realm Monthly (Issue 13 - Oct 2003)
