= Brindlewood Bay =

Murder mystery tabletop role-playing game

- Designers: Jason Cordova
- Publishers: Gauntlet Publishing
- Publication: 2022; 4 years ago
- Genres: tabletop role-playing game, murder mystery
- Skills: role-playing, storytelling

Brindlewood Bay is a murder mystery tabletop role-playing game about elderly women amateur detectives, inspired by Murder, She Wrote and H. P. Lovecraft. It was designed by Jason Cordova and was published by Gauntlet Publishing after a 2022 Kickstarter campaign raised $477,518 from 7,748 backers.

== Reception ==
Brindlewood Bay won the 2023 Gold ENnie Award for Best Electronic Book. Linda Codega for Gizmodo praised the game for its blend of supernatural plots with sitcom tropes. Em Friedman for Polygon named it one of the best tabletop RPGs of 2022, praising its mystery game mechanics and character creation. Meaghan Colleran for Bell of Lost Souls said it was reminiscent of "watching TV on a rainy day", concluding, "It's campy, it's a little weird, and it's fun." Alex Meehan for Dicebreaker named Brindlewood Bay one of the best tabletop role-playing games to play in 2024. Brindlewood Bay also received the “special mention” by the jury of the Gioco di ruolo dell’anno award at Lucca Comics & Games 2024, for its game design merits and its influence on mystery and investigation role-playing games.
