= AnyVan =

UK-based online marketplace

- Company type: Limited company
- Industry: Courier, transport, removals, and logistics
- Founded: March 2009
- Founders: Angus Elphinstone; Ben Goor
- Headquarters: Hammersmith, London, United Kingdom
- Services: Online marketplace for transport services
- Website: www.anyvan.com

AnyVan is a UK-based online marketplace offering large-item delivery, removals services, vehicle transport and storage. The platform matches a user's delivery needs to the existing routes of transport providers or those nearby.

The company operates across the United Kingdom, parts of continental Europe, and the United States, providing both domestic and commercial services. AnyVan is headquartered in Hammersmith, London.

== History ==
AnyVan was founded by Angus Elphinstone and Ben Goor in 2009. While running a removal business called White Van Gentleman in his hometown, Elphinstone developed an idea that he claimed could help tackle problems such as the unregulated pricing of removals and the vast production of carbon dioxide due to inefficient logistics. An online marketplace was created which Elphinstone believed would optimise capacity and minimise unused haulage and delivery space. AnyVan, as a provider, matches a consumer's delivery route with an existing transporter partner already traveling that way.

AnyVan began its operations in the UK in 2009. In 2012, it expanded to Germany and started allowing transporters based in that country to bid for delivery jobs.

=== Ownership ===
AnyVan is fully owned by Goorstone Holdings, a limited liability partnership whose membership comprises AnyVan's founder Angus Elphinstone and Celer Investments, a limited liability company registered in the British Virgin Islands.

== Area covered ==
AnyVan operated exclusively in the UK between October 2009 and February 2012. In March 2012, the company expanded in Germany, opening a German website and allowing German transport providers to bid. As of December 2015, the company also operates in Ireland, Spain, France and Italy.

== Awards ==
AnyVan.com has received awards only for its first year of operations. These were from the thegoodwebguide.co.uk website of the year award in 2010, the Green Entrepreneur Awards' Green Project of the Year 2010 and the Rushlight Award for Environmental Sustainability. It has also received a 5/5 rating from Webuser.com in 2010.

== See also ==
- Shiply
- uShip
- Reverse auction
- U-Haul
