= Dark Sun Campaign Setting =

Dark Sun Campaign Setting is a 2010 role-playing game supplement published by Wizards of the Coast for Dungeons & Dragons.

== Contents ==
Dark Sun Campaign Setting is a supplement in which Athas is presented as a brutal, godless desert world ruled by sorcerer‑kings, offering players and Dungeon Masters new character options, survival rules, and adventure material for creating campaigns.

== Publication history ==
Shannon Appelcline wrote that "in previous years, Wizards had released a 'Campaign Guide', a 'Player's Guide', and a standalone adventure for each setting, but by 2010 things were changing for the 4e line. One of those changes impacted the schedule for setting releases. Though Dark Sun still got three books, the 'Campaign Guide' and 'Player's Guide' were combined into the Dark Sun Campaign Setting. This made room for a standalone Creature Catalog — something that was particularly important for the unique world of Athas. The adventure Marauders of the Dune Sea (2010) closed out the trilogy".

Appelcline commented that with the second season of Encounters, Dark Sun: Fury of the Wastewalker (2010, 14 weeks), "An introduction to the Dark Sun setting and the city of Tyr, intended to complement the Dark Sun Campaign Setting (2010)."

== Reception ==
Dark Sun Campaign Setting won the Silver for "Best Setting" at the 2011 ENnie Awards.

== Reviews ==
- DM Sketchpad (Volume 2, Issue 2 - Aug 2010)
