= Dolmenwood Campaign Book =

2025 role-playing game supplement

Dolmenwood Campaign Book is a 2025 role-playing game supplement published by Exalted Funeral for Dolmenwood: Adventure and Peril in Fairytale Woods.

== Contents ==
Dolmenwood Campaign Book is a supplement in which a comprehensive guide to running Dolmenwood campaigns details its fairy‑tale folklore, factions, settlements, exploration procedures, magical wonders, and includes a starter adventure.

== Reception ==
Katie Wickens for GamesRadar+ said that "Dolmenwood is a rich and fanciful setting, backed by an unforgiving old-school revival ruleset that definitely improves on the author's OSE system, making it more accessible to new players."

Dolmenwood Campaign Book won the Gold ENNIE for "Best Setting" and was nominated for "Product of the Year" for the 2026 ENNIE Awards.
