= Grimm (role-playing game) =

Tabletop role-playing game

Grimm is a role-playing game, released by Fantasy Flight Games. The current version is a standalone game using the Linear D6 system. The Linear D6 version is a significant expansion of the original material, including a more fully developed setting, a monster manual and game mechanics, all of which were previously provided by the core D20 System rule books.

Linear D6 is unusual in that it deliberately limits randomness having characters perform at their ability level 2/3 of the time. The mechanic represents teamwork by a dice pool which increases chances of scoring above character ability and reduces the chances of failure.

The original version was released in 2003 as part of Fantasy Flight Games Horizon open-ended miniature Dungeons & Dragons campaign settings, making of use the D20 System under the Open Game Licence. The setting can be used as a supplement to D&D that introduces a new setting based on a "twisted" version of the fairytales of the Brothers Grimm. The correlation between the realm of Grimm and the original fairytales is in many ways comparable to the correlation of White Wolf's World of Darkness with our world. The game provides new core classes which enable players to take on role of children lost in this strange and terrifying realm. The release of Grimm v1 was rushed which caused the Streetfighter Feat to not be included in the first edition of the book. The complete feat description was made available on the website.

== Reception ==
Grimm won the 2004 Gold Ennie Award for "Best Art, Cover" and the Silver Ennie Award for "Best d20 Game".

== Reviews ==
- Backstab #47
