= The Gauntlet (tabletop games producer) =

Tabletop games producer

- Industry: Tabletop role-playing games, Podcasting
- Founder: Jason Cordova
- Website: https://www.gauntlet-rpg.com/

The Gauntlet is a publisher/producer of tabletop role-playing games and podcasts. Their publications include Trophy RPG and Brindlewood Bay. In addition to game books, they publish a monthly game zine called Codex to encourage experimentation in indie role-playing games and OSR. Their games and podcasts have won multiple ENNIE Awards. As of November 2024, The Gauntlet has raised over one million dollars USD on Kickstarter and BackerKit combined.

== Publishing/Production History ==
=== Games ===
The Between was written by Jason Cordova and crowdfunded on BackerKit in November 2024, raising $289,681. The Between is a Victorian era monster-hunting game based on the Brindlewood Bay rules. It is scheduled for digital release in April 2025 and physical release in November 2025.

Trophy RPG was written by Jesse Ross and published in 2022. It is a dark fantasy game and was funded on Kickstarter with $210,141 from 2,543 backers. Trophy won the 2023 Silver ENNIE Award for “Best Game,” and was nominated in 2 additional categories: "Best Rules," and "Product of the Year." Trophy is designed for both one-shot games via Trophy Dark and ongoing campaigns though Trophy Gold. Gauntlet has published a related campaign setting book titled Trophy Loom.

Brindlewood Bay was written by Jason Cordova and published in 2022. It is a murder mystery game and was funded on Kickstarter with $477,518 from 7,748 backers. It won the 2023 Gold ENNIE Award for "Best Electronic Book."

Hearts of Wulin was written by Agatha Cheng and Lowell Francis and published in 2021. It is a Wuxia game that uses the Powered by the Apocalypse framework and was funded on Kickstarter with $38,262 from 1,332 backers. Hearts of Wulin was featured on One Shot Podcast Network.

=== Podcasts ===
- Fear of a Black Dragon: about fantasy modules and setting books; won the 2018 Silver ENNIE Award for "Best Podcast."
- Trophy Podcast: actual play of Trophy; nominated for the 2021 ENnie award for "Best Podcast."
