= Cthulhu Dark Ages =

- Publisher: Chaosium
- Publication date: 2004

Cthulhu Dark Ages is a 2004 role-playing game supplement published by Chaosium for Call of Cthulhu.

== Contents ==
Cthulhu Dark Ages is a supplement in which the cosmic horror of the Cthulhu Mythos is brought into the year 1000 A.D., where Dark Age struggles intertwine with the enduring menace of its otherworldly denizens.

== Publication history ==
Shannon Appelcline noted that Chaosium published some new books to supplement their reprints beginning in 2003, including "Cthulhu: Dark Ages (2004), one of Cthulhu's first takes on a new setting in many years"."

== Reception ==
Cthulhu Dark Ages was the Gold winner for "Best Non-d20 Game" at the 2004 ENNIE Awards.

== Reviews ==
- Pyramid
- Backstab
- Anduin (Issue 81 - Mar 2003)
- RPG Review (Issue 18 - Dec 2012)
