= Shiply =

Web based transport service

Shiply Ltd.
- Company type: Private Limited Company
- Founded: March 2008; 18 years ago
- Founder: Robert Matthams
- Headquarters: London, United Kingdom
- Services: Online marketplace For transport services
- Owner: Robert Patrick Matthams
- Website: www.shiply.com

Shiply is a UK-based limited company providing an internet marketplace where transport service requesters may list items they need to move, and where providers of transport services can bid in a reverse auction format. The website attracts a variety of transport providers, including vehicle shipping companies, household movers, general freight transporters, and other types of logistics companies that essentially look for jobs via the Shiply Load board, where users (customers) are posting moving requests that the providers can then bid on. The customer can then sift through the prospective bids on their posted request, and select a provider they are comfortable with. Shiply got its start back in 2008 in the United Kingdom, but eventually expanded to several additional countries including the US and Canada.

Shiply charges a service fee to the shipper as well as the transport provider, although it is free to post jobs, and it is free for transport providers to search jobs, fees are eventually charged once a customer accepts and signs off on a shipping provider.

== Concept ==
The concept employed by Shiply aims to utilise transport capacity that may be wasted in inefficient transport operations and as a consequence enables transport service providers to offer marginal prices to transport service requesters.

Service requesters create accounts and list the items to be transported, stipulating the maximum they are prepared to pay and specifying whether they can be flexible on delivery/pickup dates or need the listed items moved subject to specified date parameters. The transport service providers bid the lowest amount they would accept to perform the transport service. A user feedback system is enabled in order to keep track of the reputation of the transport service providers and transport service requesters, this allows the transport service requesters the ability to frame their procurement decision on factors other than solely price.

Registration is free for both transport service providers and transport service requesters. Transport service providers' bids are subject to a transaction based tiered fee structure, (in the UK this is between 3.9% and 9.9% -dependent on the amount of the transaction-with a minimum fee of £6) the cost of which is borne by the transport service requesters. Transport service requesters may also be subject to an auction service fee. This fee amount is dependent on the shipment in question and is displayed before the transport service requester accepts a bid.

In September 2010 Shiply had 17,500 transport service provider accounts, and helped voice their concerns over trade-related issues.

== History ==
=== Formation ===
Shiply was founded in March 2008 by Robert Matthams, in Manchester. He has said he had the idea of this business concept when a pool table he ordered was delivered to his university in Manchester. The driver complained that he would have to make the return journey to London empty, thereby wasting fuel and his own resources.

Initially, only haulage companies from UK participated in the marketplace. In October 2009, the company expanded in Germany, opening a German website and allowing German haulage companies. In August 2010, when the company expanded to France, Italy, the Netherlands and Spain, 15% of shipments on Shiply already crossed national borders and 10% of its business came from the German website. according to the French website Shipedi

=== eBay ===
In March 2009 Shiply launched an eBay widget to be inserted by sellers into eBay auction listings. This - now part of the item listing process - gives prospective eBay bidders the option to import items they have won - or on which they are currently bidding - into Shiply.com. The widget allows them to enter their delivery post code and then Shiply imports other pertinent information into their listing. In January 2011, Shiply signed an exclusive agreement with eBay Motors UK, becoming the site's transport partner. At that time, 50% of its business came from eBay users.

== Operations ==
=== Areas covered ===
Shiply operates in multiple countries, including; The United States, The United Kingdom, Germany, France, Spain, Mexico, Spain, Italy, India, Canada, Brazil & Australia according to their website as of March 2024.

=== Types of freight moved on Shiply ===
Shiply advertises several types of items that they help to arrange shipping for on their website, including:

- Motor Vehicles
- Boats
- Furniture
- Household items
- Auto parts
- Heavy equipment
- Pets
- General freight
- LTL freight

== Controversies ==
=== Legal dispute ===
On 24 February 2011 uShip and Shiply jointly announced a settlement regarding uShip's claims of trademark and copyright infringement. As part of the settlement, Shiply has agreed to redesign some parts of its web site, and pay an amount in compensation to uShip.

=== Misleading Advertising ===
On 19 December 2012, UK's ASA published an adjudication against Shiply Ltd about misleading advertising on www.shiply.com.

The ASA investigated whether www.shiply.com made it sufficiently clear that a credit policy applied to cancellations. The ASA concluded:

"The home page breached CAP Code (Edition 12) rules 3.1 and 3.3 (Misleading advertising), 3.9 and 3.10 (Qualification)." "Because of Shiply Ltd's continued non compliance we took the decision to place the details for www.shiply.com on the ASA section of the website on 14 October 2013. Shiply Ltd's details shall remain in place until such time as www.shiply.com clearly and prominently states the significant condition of its cancellation policy on its home page."

Shiply Ltd's details are no longer on the ASA section of the website.

=== Carrier Compliance (USA) ===
One notable concern some have brought attention to, is the possible lack of oversight as to the credentials of trucking companies on the Shiply platform. An investigative piece found that many of the companies bidding on loads do not have active DOT numbers required by the FMCSA to haul freight. Shiply does not disclose the DOT info or FMCSA info of motor carrier providers during the bidding process, it only shows a provider's username, jobs completed, and their overall Shiply Rating.

== Reception ==
Shiply has been covered in the UK media as successful start-up business during recession times, as a provider of cheap shipping alternatives, and as an innovative idea for tackling climate change.

== Awards ==
In 2010 Shiply was awarded the Shell Springboard Climate Change Innovation Prize, and was runner-up in the Dutch Postcode Lottery's 2010 Green Challenge competition.

== See also ==
- uShip
- AnyVan
- Reverse auction
