= Catalyst Games =

Austin based non-profit hosting corporate games

- Formerly: Startup Games
- Company type: non-profit organization
- Industry: Events
- Founded: 2012; 14 years ago
- Headquarters: Austin, Texas, USA
- Area served: Texas
- Key people: Gillian Wilson, Founder & President
- Services: Running corporate games
- Number of employees: 5
- Website: www.catalystgames.com

Catalyst Games (formerly Startup Games) is an Austin-based non-profit organization that hosts a series of events centered on competition between tech companies in games common to startup culture. Founded in 2012, the organization holds several annual competitions, with each company playing on behalf of a charity of their choice.

== History ==
=== Past events ===
Startup Games was founded in 2012 with the original name of Austin Startup Olympics. The inaugural games were held on January 21, 2012, at uShip's headquarters and featured Adlucent, Boundless Network, BuildASign, Mass Relevance (now part of Spredfast), SpareFoot, Spredfast, uShip and WhaleShark Media (now RetailMeNot). uShip won the inaugural Catalyst Games competition.

The organization's only Summer Games edition took place on June 9, 2012. BuildASign was the winning team.

SpareFoot won the next three Austin editions of Catalyst Games from 2013 to 2015, playing for Kure It Cancer Research.

Catalyst Games held its first Catalyst Games: Level Up event on April 11, 2015. This event is for companies larger than 250 employees. BuildASign was the winning team.

=== Impact and growth ===
As of 2015, Catalyst Games had donated more than $175,000 to charities and is expanding to other startup communities, with San Antonio, New York and Chicago scheduled for 2015.

=== Leadership ===
Catalyst Games was founded as a collaboration between the eight original competing companies. It has since been independently incorporated as a non-profit company, with one of the founding members, Gillian Wilson, serving as president.
