= Realm Works =

Realm Works is a computer engine published by Lone Wolf Development as a play aid for role-playing games.

== Description ==
Realm Works is an engine to assist in running role-playing games.

== Reception ==
Realm Works was named the Silver Winner in the "Best Software" category of the ENnie Awards in 2014.

== Reviews ==
- Black Gate
