= Liminal Horror =

Survival horror tabletop role-playing game

- Designers: Goblin Archives and Josh Domanski
- Illustrators: Zach Hazard Vaupen
- Publication: 2023

Liminal Horror is a 2023 survival horror tabletop role-playing game by Goblin Archives and Josh Domanski, with art direction by Zach Hazard Vaupen. The player characters are investigators. Liminal Horror's module The Bloom was nominated for the 2024 ENNIE Awards for "Best Adventure – Long Form." The Mall Remastered won Silver for "Best Adventure - Short Form" in the 2025 ENNIE Awards.

== Gameplay ==
Character creation is based on archetypes that grant starting equipment. Characters have three base statistics: strength, dexterity, and control. A gamemaster system called the "Voidcrawl Procedure" randomizes how to reveal mystery clues to the players.

== Reception ==
The Bloom module was nominated for the 2024 ENNIE Awards for "Best Adventure – Long Form." Aaron Boehm for Bloody Disgusting wrote that "Liminal Horror as a system is a great combination of old-school dungeon crawling mechanics with modern story-focused sensibilities".

The Mall Remastered won Silver for "Best Adventure - Short Form" in the 2025 ENNIE Awards.

== Modules ==
- The Mall
- The Bureau
- The Bloom
- Parthenogenesis of Hungry Hollow
- Tales from the Void
