= Alice is Missing =

Tabletop role-playing game

- Designers: Spenser Starke
- Illustrators: Julianne Griepp
- Publishers: Hunters Entertainment; Renegade Game Studios
- Publication: 2020
- Genres: Tabletop role-playing game
- Players: 3–5
- Setup time: 45 minutes
- Playing time: 90+ minutes
- Chance: High
- Age range: 16+
- Skills: Role-playing, writing
- Materials required: Text message device
- Website: Alice is Missing

Alice is Missing is a tabletop role-playing game played in silence through text messaging. Players investigate the disappearance of a high school girl named Alice Briarwood by assuming the roles of characters who have preexisting relationships with her and each other. The game was designed by Spenser Starke and published by Hunters Entertainment in 2020 after raising over $138,000 on Kickstarter. It has both physical and digital editions.

The first expansion, Alice is Missing: Silent Falls, was released following a second successful Kickstarter in 2023. The second expansion, Alice is Missing: Whispering Pines, was released in 2025.

== Gameplay ==
Alice is Missing is designed for 3–5 players, with each player being assigned a character. The game begins with each player receiving a character card, detailing their character's name and prompts about the character's background, motivations, and relationship to Alice Briarwood. The most experienced player is assigned the role of facilitator, and is tasked with running the game. The facilitator role is comparable to a Game Master, but participates in the game as a player character as well. The initial forty-five minutes are dedicated to setup; establishing characters, relationships, and important locations in the story. Following the setup, the actual game lasts for ninety minutes and is communication is held entirely through text messages on players' cellphones or other messaging devices. The game is timed using an official "Animated Timer" available on YouTube, which consists of music curated to match the emotional tone of the game at that point in the story. The game also includes safety tools such as Lines and Veils and the X-Card.

The bulk of the gameplay consists of interacting with the other players as the assigned characters, both in a main group chat and in separate private conversations, with the objective being to “figure out” what happened to Alice, though the answer is not yet established. At certain times throughout the game, new evidence and information as to Alice's whereabouts or her captor is hypothesized via evidence cards.

=== Characters ===
Alice is Missing has five main characters assigned to the players:

- Charlie Barnes – "The One Who Moved Away"
- Dakota Travis – "The Best Friend"
- Julia North – "The Secret Girlfriend"
- Jack Briarwood – "The Older Brother"
- Evan Holwell – "The One With The Crush"

The Silent Falls expansion introduced four new playable characters:

- Morgan Bridges – "The One Who Moved Away" (takes place of Charlie if used)
- Jordan Foster – "The Childhood Friend"
- Hollis Briarwood – "The Younger Sibling"
- Steven Yates – "The Ex-Boyfriend"

The player who takes on the facilitator role must play as either Charlie Barnes or Morgan Bridges.

== Publication history ==
Alice is Missing was designed by Spenser Starke, with illustration by Julianne Griepp. After raising over $138,000 on Kickstarter, it was published by Hunters Entertainment in partnership with Renegade Game Studios in 2020. It was released as a physical game, a PDF, and a digital game on Roll20. Starke stated that the game's setting and tone was heavily inspired by indie video games such as Life is Strange, Oxenfree, Firewatch, and Gone Home.

In 2023, Alice is Missing received an expansion, Silent Falls, which introduced 38 new cards to the game. This expansion was also crowdfunded on Kickstarter. The Kickstarter included two backer exclusive versions of the game – a version with an alternative Searching Cards deck designed by Banana Chan and Starke and the "Keepsake Experience" version which includes physical handouts and other memorabilia produced by Noxweiler Ignatius Berf.

Alice is Missing: Digital Edition, developed in collaboration with Pixel Table, launched in 2024. This browser-based version adjusts the original gameplay to be more streamlined by automating clue assignments, allowing for character customization, and synchronizing the game timer and soundtrack for the players. An updated version of the digital edition, Alice is Missing: Digital Edition V2, and a summer camp themed DLC, titled Whispering Pines, were released in 2025.

== Reception ==
Alice is Missing won the 2021 Gold ENNIE Awards for "Best Game," "Best Rules," and "Product of the Year." It also won the 2021 IndieCade award for tabletop design. In France, the game was nominated for the 2023 As d'Or award in the Initié category and won the 2023 Prix du Jury award at the Prix Lizzie Magie.

In 2020, Emily St. James for Vox compared the game to Twin Peaks, praised its suitability for remote play, and called it "sublime." In 2022, Anthony Mirelli of RTBF called Alice is Missing a "little masterpiece, well worth the detour". Mirelli noted the option to play online but preferred the in-person experience with the shared silent room during gameplay. He highlighted the "unique experience" that results from the gameplay and that the player will be left "thinking about it" in the days after the game.

In a ludography on queer tabletop roleplaying games, academics Jailyn Zabala et al highlighted that player characters in Alice is Missing are "defined by their relationship with Alice" and gender and/or sexual identity along with appearance "have no mechanical impact on what the player character is able to do; instead, mechanics are influenced by the way previous relationships or experiences impact the character's interaction with the world". On safety tools, they noted that Alice is Missing is one of the games which offers "a structured alternative for player comfort by allowing them to alter content that may make them uncomfortable" such as its rulebook "explicitly" stating "the easiest way to remove content related to violence towards Alice".

== Film adaptation ==
In 2022, Paramount Pictures announced plans to adapt Alice is Missing into a film. The upcoming film is set to be written by Spencer Starke and Becca Gleason, and produced by Ivan Van Norman and Christopher De La Rosa.
