= Kill Six Billion Demons =

Webcomic

- Author: Tom Bloom
- Website: killsixbilliondemons.com
- Launch date: April 29, 2013
- Genre(s): Fantasy, New Weird

Kill Six Billion Demons (also referred to as Kill 6 Billion Demons, K6BD, or KSBD) is a new weird/fantasy webcomic, written and illustrated by Tom Bloom (né Parkinson-Morgan) under the name Abbadon, and published in print by Image Comics. It was created in 2013 and has yet to reach its finale, though current updates take place in what the author considers to be the series' final book. There are six books in total, named Kill Six Billion Demons, Wielder of Names, Seeker of Thrones, King of Swords, Breaker of Infinities, and Wheel Smashing Lord.

== Plot ==
The plot follows an initially insecure sorority girl named Allison Ruth, who finds herself thrown into a plot many thousands of worlds larger than her. Allison is forcibly given "Key of Kings", the most powerful artifact in the multiverse and teleported to the city of Throne, the center of the multiverse, while her unstable boyfriend gets kidnapped. The girl discovers that she – alongside a devil named Cio and an angel named White Chain – must challenge the rule of seven other keyholders – known as demiurges – who split the multiverse between each other, in order to save her boyfriend... and the multiverse itself.

== Setting ==
Kill Six Billion Demons is set throughout a collection of 777,777 separate universes called The Wheel, in which every being lives and travels between via spokes which branch off the city in the center of the wheel, known as Throne. This collection of universes is ruled evenly (111,111 worlds each) by powerful beings known as The Seven, the main antagonists of the plot, and is inhabited by numerous races and cultures. One of them contains the Earth, where Allison and Zaid are from.

== Characters ==
=== Allison's group ===
- Allison Ruth, an unequipped sorority girl who is thrust into a world she doesn't understand, with a great power she can't control.
- Ciocie Cioelle (pronounced how Coca-Cola is spelled), a snarky devil secretary and fanfiction writer who follows alongside Allison, seeking a heroic story to write about.
- 82 White Chain Born in Emptiness Returns to Subdue Evil (or "White Chain", for short), a cold, unforgiving angel and ardent peacekeeper, who joins Allison to make sure she does not use her new power foolishly.
- Mathangi "Maya" Mantra, a drunkard, recluse, and incredibly powerful warrior, who initially follows Allison from a distance.
- Nyave Anyadis, a talented girl from Mykos who considers Allison a hero.
- Princess Jack Moonshine, formerly an ebon devil called Vladok, she joins the team after being defeated and named again by Allison.
- Zaid, Allison's boyfriend who gets kidnapped in the beginning of the story

=== The Seven ===
- Gog-Agog, The Queen of Worms, a maddened multiverse-spanning hivemind, named after Gog and Magog.
- Incubus, The Sword King, an ambitious, bloodthirsty swordsman who makes deals with Allison, named after incubus.
- Jadis, the Lady of Infinite Repose, an omniscient sorceress who sealed herself in a glass block, named after Jadis.
- Jagganoth, The God Eater, a cunning strategist and invincible warrior, named after Jagannath.
- Mammon, the Grand Dragon, a greedy, ancient reptilian creature hiding within a vault of his own creation, named after Mammon.
- Nadia Om, the Blood Flower, a gluttonous queen who strips worlds of their resources to throw extravagant celebrations.
- Solomon David, the God Emperor of the Celestial Empire, obsessed with maintaining the perfection of his empire through the rule of law, named after Solomon and David.

=== Others ===
- Zoss, The Conquering King, former master of the Multiverse, who bequeaths his power on Allison, before being apparently killed, which doesn't stop him from appearing to her afterwards.
- 2 Michael, leader of the Aeons, who are known as angels. Named after Michael.
- Metatron 1, God's Scribe, the oldest and most powerful of angels, who was believed dead, but secretly remained the only angel who was never killed and reborn ("1" means first incarnation). Named after Metatron.
- 6 Juggernaut Star Scours the Universe, Speaker of the Thorns, a powerful commander of angels, called the Thorn Knights, who kidnap Zaid.
- 10 Vigilant Gaze Purges the Horizon, an angel who is a White Chain's friend.

== Origins ==
According to Bloom, Kill Six Billion Demons was originally conceived around 2004. Early concepts involved a girl receiving a key from a fugitive, godlike warrior and were supposed to borrow elements from Shōnen manga. The comic began as a "Choose Your Own Adventure" thread on the MS Paint Adventures discussion forum in 2012. Bloom, then going by the pseudonym Orbitaldropkick, would allow readers to suggest what should happen next, while Bloom would set the tone, draw the pages, and choose how exactly the world reacted to the protagonist's reader-chosen antics. He converted it into a standalone webcomic in 2013, hosted on its own website. The first pages were released in monochrome format, however, by chapter 2, Bloom decided to gear his efforts toward fully coloured pages. Image Comics began publishing print compilations in 2016.

Bloom has noted that the name Kill Six Billion Demons was initially conceived under the pretense of the original "Choose Your Own Adventure"-style comic the concept originated from, claiming that "Kill Seven Black Emperors" would be more fitting to the current comic.

The art in Kill Six Billion Demons is influenced by the work of Wayne Douglas Barlowe and Jean Giraud. The author has also listed Geof Darrow, James Stokoe, Sheldon Vella, and Noriyoshi Ohrai as influences on his work. Additionally, the comic and its setting draw inspiration from Hindu mythology, Greek Gnosticism, the Berserk series, and The Elder Scrolls.

== Reception ==
Black Gate praised its "originality, scope of vision, and explosive visuals", calling it "disorienting, unsettling, inspiring, fascinating, (and) beautiful", and comparing it favorably to China Miéville's Perdido Street Station. Io9 described its art as "stuffed with sumptuous insanity", and lauded Bloom's ability to provide exposition in a way "that would be tedious in a lesser comic". Bleeding Cool noted that the comic "starts out a little rough in the art department", but soon progresses "from a cool looking comic with a great read to a great looking comic with a fantastic read." Publishers Weekly, reviewing the first collected volume, called it "visually and textually stunning", and a display of Bloom's "impressive worldbuilding abilities", but noted that the illustration (although "never muddled") was nonetheless "sketchy", and observed that the plot of that volume "serves mainly as prologue". ComicsBeat praised the comic's writing and art – especially its establishing shots, noting that "Bloom creates amazing establishing shots of massive alien landscapes", and that "there are no generic character designs here. Every time the character enter a new, crowded area it feels like going into Mos Eisley's Cantina".

== See also ==
- Lancer (role-playing game), co-created by Bloom
- Cain (role-playing game), created by Bloom
