= Queerz! TTRPG =

Superheroes tabletop role-playing game

- Designers: Amít Moshe
- Illustrators: Isa Isago Fukuda
- Writers: Steven Pope
- Publishers: Son of Oak
- Publication: March 2024
- Genres: tabletop role-playing game
- Website: https://cityofmist.co/blogs/story/queerz-press-kit

Queerz! TTRPG is a tabletop role-playing game about LGBTQ superheroes, inspired by Super Sentai (Power Rangers). The heroes use kindness, empathy, self-acceptance, and friendship to battle villains that represent bigotry and ignorance. The mood is campy. The game is based on the manga Queerz! by Isa Isago Fukuda. The game was designed by Amít Moshe based on his City of Mist system, with writing by Steven Pope and illustrations by Isa, who created the manga. Queerz! was published in March 2024 by Son of Oak game studio after raising $104,292 on Kickstarter.

== Gameplay ==
The game mechanics are based on Moshe's previous game, City of Mist. According to Jeffrey Dohm-Sanchez for ICv2, Queerz uses "power tag mechanics where any abilities, characteristics, resources, allies, or moves can be named by the player and invoked during play as an action."

In an interview with Egg Embry for EN World, Amít Moshe explained that "when the Queerz win they enter the Inner Space and hash out what made their enemies turn into villains, and eventually they become their allies."

== Reception ==
Jon Eakin for TheGamer.com listed Queerz! as having the best villains in a superhero TTRPG and wrote, "Queerz is among the best TTRPGs ever made." He explained:

What makes it so special is the way it forces every villain to be a three-dimensional character. They all have motives that make sense to them, and the process of dealing with them always involves grappling with those reasons, and the person they are, in order to figure out how to get through to them.

Coleman Gailloreto for Screen Rant recommended Queerz! for fans of Power Rangers and the Persona video games.

Gayming Magazine wrote:

QUEERZ! tackles important issues in a heartfelt and richly entertaining way. Using the creative tag-based engine of City of Mist, players can combine their own unique abilities with core moves like Slay, Strike a Pose, Care, Be Vulnerable, and Talk It Out, mixing anime action, light-heartedness, and drama at the table.
