= Mythic Britain & Ireland =

Role-playing game supplement

Mythic Britain & Ireland is a 2022 role-playing game supplement published by Free League Publishing for Vaesen.

== Contents ==
Mythic Britain & Ireland is a supplement about the British islands.

== Reception ==
Vaesen RPG – Mythic Britain & Ireland won the 2023 Gold ENnie Award for Best Interior Art, Best Setting, and Product of the Year.

== Reviews ==
- Gnome Stew
- CGMagazine
