= Trophy RPG =

2022 tabletop role-playing game

- Designers: Jesse Ross
- Publishers: Gauntlet Publishing
- Publication: 2022
- Genres: Tabletop role-playing game, horror

Trophy RPG is a psychological horror tabletop role-playing game by Jesse Ross about doomed treasure hunters in the woods. There are two versions of the game: Trophy Dark and Trophy Gold. Trophy Dark is designed for single session play, while Trophy Gold is designed for longer campaigns. Both versions were published by Gauntlet Publishing in 2022 after a successful Kickstarter campaign raised $210,141. Trophy RPG won the silver medal for "Best Game" at the 2023 ENNIE Awards.

== Gameplay ==
Gameplay includes collaborative storytelling, randomized character creation, and dice pools. The instructions provide guidance for maintaining players' consent. Trophy Dark consists of story templates called "incursions." Instead of leveling-up, characters gradually deteriorate.

== Reception ==
Trophy RPG won a Silver ENNIE Award for "Best Game" in 2023. In the same year, it was also nominated for "Product of the Year" and "Best Rules."

Charlie Theel for Polygon wrote in a review that Trophy Dark "hums along, like a well-tuned instrument intent on playing its own entrancing ballad" and that the "experience was special." Linda Codega for Polygon wrote, "The game’s mechanics allow for an approachable grimdark, swords-and-sorcery fantasy". Rowan Cardosa for TheGamer recommended Trophy RPG as one of ten tabletop games for fans of dark fantasy.
