= 2002 ENnie Award winners =

- Awarded for: Best role-playing games of previous year
- Country: United Kingdom & United States
- Presented by: Gen Con
- First award: 2001

The following are the winners of the 2nd annual ENnie Awards, held in 2002:

== List of winners ==
Category	Gold Winner
Best Adventure	If Thoughts Could Kill (Malhavoc Press; Bruce R. Cordell)
Best d20 Game	Darwin's World (RPGObjects; Dominic Covey)
Best Rules Supplement	Manual of the Planes (Wizards of the Coast; Jeff Grubb, Bruce R. Cordell, David Noonan)
Best Campaign Setting	Oriental Adventures (Wizards of the Coast; James Wyatt)
Best Setting Supplement	Freeport: City of Adventure (Green Ronin Publishing; Chris Pramas, Matt Forbeck, Jim Bishop, Hal Mangold)
Best Free Product or Web Enhancement	Portable Hole Full of Beer (Ambient; M Jason Parent)
Best Aid or Accessory	Dungeon/Polyhedron Magazine (Wizards of the Coast; Chris Thomasson, Erik Mona)
Best Cartography	Freeport: City of Adventure (Green Ronin Publishing; Todd Gamble, Rob Lee)
Best Art (Interior)	Deities & Demigods (Wizards of the Coast; Dennis Cramer, Tony DiTerlizzi, Jeff Eaxley, Wayne Reynolds, Arnie Swekel, Sam Wood, et al.)
Best Art (Cover)	Lord of the Iron Fortress (Wizards of the Coast; Todd Lockwood)
Best Graphic Design and Layout	Call of Cthulhu (Wizards of the Coast; Robert Campbell, Dawn Murin)
Best Monster Supplement	Creature Collection II: Dark Menagerie (Scarred Lands) (Sword & Sorcery Studios; Clark Peterson, Bill Webb)
Best Fan Resource Site	SWRPGNetwork
Best Fan Campaign Site	Conan d20
Best Official Website	Wizards of the Coast
Best Publisher	Wizards of the Coast
