= 2008 ENnie Award winners =

- Awarded for: Best role-playing games of previous year
- Country: United Kingdom & United States
- Presented by: Gen Con
- First award: 2001

The following are the winners of the 8th annual ENnie Awards, held in 2008:

== List of winners ==
Category	Gold Winner	Silver Winner
Best Cover Art	Pathfinder # 1: Burnt Offerings, Paizo Publishing	Scion: God, White Wolf Publishing
Best Interior Art	Changeling: The Lost, White Wolf Publishing	Pathfinder # 1: Burnt Offerings, Paizo Publishing
Best Production Values	Changeling: The Lost, White Wolf Publishing	The Savage World of Solomon Kane, Pinnacle Entertainment Group
Best Writing	Changeling: The Lost, White Wolf Publishing	Trail of Cthulhu, Pelgrane Press
Best Rules	Star Wars Saga Edition, Wizards of the Coast	Trail of Cthulhu, Pelgrane Press
Best Cartography	Pirate’s Guide to Freeport, Green Ronin Publishing	DCC #51: Castle Whiterock, Goodman Games
Best Monster or Adversary	Pathfinder: Classic Monsters Revisited, Paizo Publishing	Elder Evils, Wizards of the Coast
Best Miniature Product	D&D Icons: Legend of Drizzt Scenario Pack, Wizards of the Coast	Dragon Tiles: Forest Adventures, Fat Dragon Games
Best Adventure	Pathfinder # 1: Burnt Offerings, Paizo Publishing	Expedition to the Ruins of Greyhawk, Wizards of the Coast
Best Regalia	Confessions of a Part-Time Sorceress: A Girl’s Guide to Dungeons & Dragons, Wizards of the Coast	Hobby Games: The 100 Best, Green Ronin Publishing
Best Setting	Pathfinder Chronicles: Gazetteer, Paizo Publishing	Pirate’s Guide to Freeport, Green Ronin Publishing
Best Supplement	True20 Companion, Green Ronin Publishing	Secrets of the Surface World, Exile Games Studio
Best Aid or Accessory	Pathfinder Chronicles: Harrow Deck, Paizo Publishing	Hero Lab, Lone Wolf Development
Best Fan Product	www.dungeonmastering.com	www.flamesrising.com
Best Free Product or Web-Enhancement	Changeling Quickstart, White Wolf Publishing	Pathfinder Roleplaying Game Alpha, Paizo Publishing
Best Electronic Book	Book of Experimental Might 2, Malhavoc Press	Changeling: Fearmaker's Promise, White Wolf Publishing
Best Game	Star Wars Roleplaying Game Saga Edition, Wizards of the Coast	Aces & Eights, Kenzer & Company
Best d20/OGL Product	Star Wars Roleplaying Game Saga Edition, Wizards of the Coast	Monte Cook’s World of Darkness, White Wolf Publishing
Product of the Year	Changeling: The Lost, White Wolf Publishing	Star Wars Roleplaying Game Saga Edition, Wizards of the Coast
Fan's Choice Best Publisher	Paizo Publishing	White Wolf Publishing
