= 2006 ENnie Award winners =

- Awarded for: Best role-playing games of previous year
- Country: United Kingdom & United States
- Presented by: Gen Con
- First award: 2001

The following are the winners of the 6th annual ENnie Awards, held in 2006:

== List of winners ==
Category	Gold Winner	Silver Winner
Best Art, Cover	Monte Cook's Arcana Evolved: Spell Treasury (Malhavoc Press)	Mastermind's Manual (Green Ronin Publishing)
Best Art, Interior	Legend of the Five Rings Third Edition (Alderac Entertainment Group)	Mastermind's Manual (Green Ronin Publishing)
Best Cartography	Dragonlance: Tasslehoff's Map Pouch: The War of the Lance (Sovereign Press)	The Shackled City Adventure Path (Paizo Publishing)
Best Production Values	Serenity Role Playing Game (Margaret Weis Productions)	A Game of Thrones (Guardians of Order)
Best Writing	Mage: The Awakening (White Wolf Publishing)	Pulp Hero (Hero Games)
Best Rules	Shadowrun 4th Edition (FanPro)	Mutants & Masterminds Second Edition (Green Ronin Publishing)
Best Adventure	The Shackled City Adventure Path (Paizo Publishing)	1 on 1 Adventures #6.66: The Pleasure Prison of the B'thuvian Demon Whore (Expeditious Retreat Press)
Best Adversary/Monster Product	Tome of Horrors 3 (Necromancer Games)	Iron Heroes Bestiary (Malhavoc Press)
Best Campaign Setting/Setting Supplement	The Shackled City Adventure Path (Paizo Publishing)	Freedom City (Green Ronin Publishing)
Best Supplement	Dragon Compendium Vol. 1 (Paizo Publishing)	Monte Cook's Arcana Evolved: Spell Treasury (Malhavoc Press)
Best Aid or Accessory	Flip-Mat (Steel Sqwire)	The 13th Hour (Midnight Syndicate Soundtrack)
Best Free Product or Web Enhancement	Age of Worms Overload (Paizo Publishing)	Mage the Awakening Demo (White Wolf Publishing)
Best Electronic Book: Sponsored by RPGNow.com	Baba Yaga: The First Setting in Rassiya (Dog Soul Publishing)	Truth & Justice (Atomic Sock Monkey Press)
Best Game	Mutants & Masterminds, 2e (Green Ronin Publishing)	A Game of Thrones (Guardians of Order)
Best d20/d20 OGL Product	Mutants & Masterminds Second Edition (Green Ronin Publishing)	A Game of Thrones (Guardians of Order)
Best Product	Shadowrun 4th Edition (FanPro)	Mutants & Masterminds Second Edition (Green Ronin Publishing)
Best Fan Site	www.yog-sothoth.com	www.farlandworld.com
Fan's Choice for Best Publisher	Green Ronin	Wizards of the Coast
The Grognard Award (for companies that represent older gaming traditions)	Necromancer Games	Goodman Games
Innovation Awards	Dread, The Impossible Dream	Truth and Justice, Atomic Sock Monkey Press
