= Outgunned =

2024 tabletop role-playing game

- Designers: Riccardo Sirignano and Simone Formicola
- Illustrators: Daniela Giubellini
- Publishers: Two Little Mice
- Publication: 2024
- Genres: Tabletop role-playing game, action

Outgunned is a heroic, cinematic action tabletop role-playing game by Riccardo Sirignano and Simone Formicola. It was inspired by action movies such as John Wick and Die Hard. It was published in 2024 after raising €286,323 on Kickstarter. Outgunned won two 2024 Silver ENNIE Awards for "Best Game" and "Product of the Year."

== Gameplay ==
Character creation is based on roles and tropes. There are ten options for character roles.

Players build dice pools of six-sided dice and look for matches. There is an adrenaline game mechanic, allowing players to roll more dice after spending adrenaline gained as a result of roleplay.
