= SpareFoot =

American self-storage listings company

- Founded: 2008
- Founder: Chuck Gordon & Mario Feghali
- Headquarters: Austin, Texas, USA
- Key people: Chuck Gordon, CEO; Mario Feghali, COO
- Number of employees: 160
- Website: www.sparefoot.com

SpareFoot is an Austin-based company that provides listings for self-storage units. The company was originally a person-to-person model, similar to Airbnb, that later developed into a marketplace for self-storage. The company now facilitates self-storage rentals between consumers and storage operators. The company was profiled as one of "America's Most Promising Startups" by Bloomberg Businessweek in 2011.

SpareFoot lists storage businesses around a particular area to show available units and prices. Customers are able to view available units, real-time price quotes, view photos and make reservations. The company currently works with more than 10,000 storage facilities across the nation.

In 2016, SpareFoot added valet-storage operators to its searchable database. This on-demand option, called Full-Service Storage, takes care of pick up, storage and return delivery on demand. As of 2017, SpareFoot's Full-Service Storage is available in almost 50 markets across the U.S.

The company has also expanded its offerings by partnering with providers of other moving and storage services. Current moving-related offerings include moving supplies, moving truck rental, and full-service storage with moving labor.

== History ==
SpareFoot was founded in 2008 by Chuck Gordon and Mario Feghali while both were attending UCLA. The concept was developed a year prior when Gordon was attending UCLA and left to spend a semester in Singapore. Gordon used space in Feghali's residence as well as space in girlfriend's garage. While away, Gordon came up with the concept which he pursued with Feghali. SpareFoot was originally formed as a person-to-person website with the concept of facilitating the rental of extra storage space in private residences to those looking for storage.

Original funding came from family members and friends. The site failed to gain traction with a person-to-person model. The founders noticed that there were more storage companies signing up to sell space as opposed to homeowners. The site was re-branded (along with a name change from Homstie to SpareFoot) and began allowing customers to find, compare and review potential storage providers.

Additional funding for SpareFoot came in 2009 when the company was accepted into an incubator program at Capital Factory in Austin, Texas. They were awarded $20,000 seed capital as well as mentoring from the program.

During a second round of funding in 2010, the company received $2 Million in investment from Silverton Partners and Floodgate Fund. The following year they raised $1.5 million in capital, bringing their second round total to $3.5 million.

In 2014, SpareFoot raised $10 million in a Series C round of venture funding from Insight Venture Partners.

On March 11, 2015, the company announced a Series D round of $33 million from Insight Venture Partners as well as Monkfish Equity and Revolution LLC.

In 2011, Chuck Gordon and Mario Feghali were named to the list of 30 Under 30 by Forbes.

== Company culture and philanthropy ==
In 2013, SpareFoot was the winner of the Austin Startup Games, a competition that paired 15 startup companies against each other in games like ping pong, flip cup, and shuffleboard. SpareFoot received $30,000 for winning which they donated to the charity Kure It Cancer Research.

The company ran a campaign in 2012, where they donated $3 in school supplies for users of their Facebook and Twitter pages who posted items they have kept since they were in grade school. SpareFoot also gave $100 vouchers for self-storage space to Washington D.C. residents affected by Hurricane Sandy in 2012.

SpareFoot was listed as one of 7 Awesome Dog-Friendly Companies for National Dog Week by Career Bliss in 2012 for allowing dogs at their headquarters in Austin.
