= Nekojima =

2023 board game

- Designers: David Carmona; Karen Nguyen
- Illustrators: Gilles Warmoes
- Publishers: Unfriendly Games; Hachette Boardgames
- Publication: 2023; 2 years ago
- Genres: Dexterity; Party
- Players: 1–5
- Playing time: 15–30 minutes
- Age range: 7+

Nekojima is a dexterity party game designed by David Carmona and Karen Nguyen, and published by Unfriendly Games in 2023. Players install electric pole pieces between districts on an island game board by manipulating the poles so that no cables or cat pieces touch.

== Publishing history ==
Nekojima designers David Carmona and Karen Nguyen claim the idea for Nekojima emerged from connecting two wooden dowels with string while renovating their house, and that the cat theming was inspired by Cat Island (Neko no shima). They submitted a prototype for Nekojima to the Festival Ludique International de Parthenay (FLIP) in 2022 where it received an award. Unfriendly Games, Carmona and Nguyen's publishing company, launched a successful Kickstarter in March 2023, and backers received copies of the game in October 2023. Preorders became available on the Unfriendly Games website in early 2024 prior to their retail release in August 2024. The game was published by Hachette Boardgames in late 2024. In December 2024, Unfriendly Games released an expansion, Nekojima: Torii Pack, which added two new pieces and mechanics.

== Gameplay ==
Nekojima is played by placing "Denchuu"–two wooden poles connected by a cord–on a circular game board divided into four coloured districts (Food, Culture, Residence, and Attraction). There are three different shapes of Denchuu distinguished by their different coloured wires (pink, blue, and white). On their turn, a player rolls two coloured dice to determine the two districts they need to place their Denchuu poles, then draws a coloured cube to determine the Denchuu type. If the coloured cube is black, they keep drawing until they have drawn a different colour. The number of black cubes drawn before drawing a valid colour is the number of cat pieces they will need to hang from cables with that valid colour at the end of their turn. The player then places their Denchuu in the correct quadrants, either on the board or stacked on already placed Denchuus, but must do so such that no cords or cats touch each other or the ground. They must manipulate their Denchuu to fit these specifications using only the poles, without touching the cable with their hands. At the end of a successful turn, all cubes drawn are placed into the level counter. The game ends when an installed Denchuu falls.

There are three modes of play: cooperative, competitive, and solo. In a cooperative or solo game, players attempt to finish all seven levels. In a competitive game, all players win except the player who caused the game to end. There are also four variants which impose restrictions stack height, grounded Denchuu, contact between pieces, or turn structure.

=== Nekojima: Torii Pack ===
Nekojima: Torii Pack is an extension that adds two new pieces: the Torii and the Maneki-neko. The Torii is placed between two districts and cannot be touched by poles, cables, or cats. A player must hang the Maneki-neko on the cable of the Denchuu they install if one or more of its poles is placed in the Culture district that turn.

== Reception ==
IGN scored Nekojima 7/10, with Matt Thrower praising its visual design, theme, and variations and concluding "Nekojima is a fun stacking game with a cool twist that isn’t quite cool enough to make it stand out strongly from the pack."

Prior to Nekojima's release, its prototype won the 2022 FLIP Creators Special Jury Prize for unpublished games. The game won the first prize of the Family Games category of the 2023 Swiss Gamers Awards. In 2025, Nekojima won the "all public" category of Entertainment Animation Awards (French: Prix de l'Animation Ludique) as part of the Festival Rennes en Jeux.
