= Making Enemies: Monster Design Inspiration for Tabletop Roleplaying Games =

Making Enemies is a 2025 book written by Keith Ammann to be used as guide for role-playing games.

== Contents ==
Making Enemies is a book in which a practical guide to designing original monsters teaches creators how to build foes with purpose, ecology, metaphor, and system‑specific mechanics.

== Reception ==
Francesco Cacciatore reviewed Making Enemies for Polygon and said that "Overall, Making Enemies is a great companion to The Monsters Know What They're Doing, and also just a great resource and learning tool for game masters and game designers."

Making Enemies won the Gold ENNIE for "Best Writing" and was nominated for "Best Aid/Accessory – Non – Digital" for the 2026 ENNIE Awards.
