= Lancer (role-playing game) =

Mecha tabletop role-playing game

- Designers: Miguel Lopez-Hall and Tom Bloom
- Publishers: Massif Press, Dark Horse Comics
- Publication: 2019, 2024
- Genres: Tabletop role-playing game, science fiction
- Website: https://massifpress.com/lancer

Lancer is a science fiction tabletop role-playing game about mecha pilots, created by Miguel Lopez-Hall (né Lopez) and Tom Bloom (né Parkinson-Morgan). The first printing of the core rulebook was published by Massif Press in 2019, followed by a second printing in collaboration with Dark Horse Comics in 2024. In deliberate contrast to dystopian settings, Lancer is inspired by classic science fiction set in post-scarcity utopias that nevertheless still face problems.

== Gameplay ==
Player characters are mecha pilots, and the setting is on the outskirts of a far-future, post-apocalyptic, technological utopia. Lancer features tactical battle mechanics and detailed character customization. Instead of experience points, Lancer tracks character growth using milestones called License Levels, allowing players to level up after each mission by hand-picking upgrades from any mech in the game. Players mix and match these upgrades to determine their mech's capabilities in battle, which can range from simple hammers and nailguns, to highly advanced AI and experimental reality-warping systems. By earning License Levels, players characters also learn new talents, which they can use to enhance the combat prowess of any mech they pilot. In battle scenarios, players use their mechs in turn-based combat to capture and defend designated points on the map.

There are also rules for narrative play, although there are fewer mechanics regarding roleplay. Conflict in narrative scenes is determined by a die roll, with bonuses applied by relevant skills to increase the chance of success. Narrative play is disconnected from the rules of mech battles, to keep the story and the complex tactical combat from interfering with one another.

== Themes ==
Lancer is set thousands of years into the future, when humans on worlds across the galaxy have been united by Union, a governing body with utopian ideals. Under Union, humanity benefits from faster-than-light travel and advanced 3D printing, which eliminates the need for currency. Conflict is created on the edges outside Union's influence, where players work to defend vulnerable worlds from bad actors while Union slowly expands. It was important to the creators for Lancer not to be a dystopian sci-fi setting, as they were tired of ''cynical'' sci-fi. They wanted the game to be fundamentally optimistic in its worldview, like classic sci-fi. According to Lopez-Hall, Lancer's setting has a Gramscian-style pessimism of the intellect and optimism of the will. The creators wanted player characters to focus on defending something dear to them. To help prioritize this, they avoided a monetary reward system. The creators also chose to add narrative descriptions to mechanics in the rule book. Tom Bloom believes that it is important for tabletop role-playing games to have narrative surrounding abilities, citing it as something that Dungeons and Dragons 5th edition does well. Lancer uses these narrative descriptions to explore anti-capitalist themes, by demonstrating the callous and detached design process of the setting's weapons-manufacturing megacorporations.

== Publication history ==
Lancer was first independently published by Massif Press in 2019 after a Kickstarter campaign raised over $400,000. In an interview with Luke Shaw for Dicebreaker, the creators attributed their disciplined work ethic on the project to Lopez-Hall's recent MFA in Creative Writing and Bloom's previous work producing the weekly webcomic Kill Six Billion Demons.

In 2023, Massif Press announced a second printing, to be published as an illustrated hardcover book in collaboration with Dark Horse Comics. The second print run was released in July 2024.

== Reception ==
Since its release, Lancer has received generally positive reviews. Polygon called it "perhaps one of the most mechanically rich mecha RPGs ever published" and "the gold standard for the subgenre." Lancer is commonly praised for its modular character creation system, its art direction, its worldbuilding, and its digital companion app, COMP/CON. One common criticism of Lancer is that its "crunchy" combat and wealth of character creation options can create a steep and intimidating learning curve.

== ENNIE Awards protest ==
Lancer was initially nominated for the 2020 ENNIE Awards for "Best Electronic Book"; however, the creators later asked to be withdrawn from nomination, in protest against a 2017 ENNIE Judges' Spotlight award for an Advanced Dungeons & Dragons supplement named Blood in the Chocolate, published by Lamentations of the Flame Princess and written by Kiel Chenier, with art by Jason Bradley Thompson. In a public email to the awards committee, Massif Press said that the supplement contained "casual graphic sexual assault and racism."

== Official supplements ==
- No Room For A Wallflower: A Lancer Narrative
- The Long Rim: A Lancer Setting
- The Karrakin Trade Baronies: A Lancer Setting
- Operation Winter Scar: A Lancer Narrative
- Operation Solstice Rain: A Lancer Narrative
- Dustgrave: A Lancer Narrative
- Siren's Song: A Mountain's Remorse
- Shadow of the Wolf: A Lancer Narrative
