= Zin Never Dies =

Fantasy tabletop role-playing game

- Designers: Eiko Nemo Dowme
- Illustrators: Eiko Nemo Dowme
- Publication: 2023
- Genres: tabletop role-playing game, indie role-playing game, fantasy
- Website: www.zinneverdies.com

Zin Never Dies is a fantasy tabletop role-playing game inspired by classic Japanese animation, created by Eiko Nemo Dowme. It takes place in a world of folk mythology and shadowy gods. Zin Never Dies contains seven species of anthropomorphic animal player characters who search for magical towers to harness a power called "Zin." Its game mechanics focus primarily on advancing the storytelling.

== Publication history ==
Zin Never Dies was released in 2023 after a successful Kickstarter campaign in 2022 raised €31,665.

== Reception ==
Matt Jarvis for Dicebreaker recommended Zin Never Dies for fans of Hollow Knight and Studio Ghibli films. The Roll for Crit podcast praised the game's art style and combat system.
