= Legend in the Mist Core Book =

2025 role-playing game supplement

Legend in the Mist Core Book is a 2025 role-playing game supplement published by Son of Oak Game Studio for Legend in the Mist.

== Contents ==
Legend in the Mist Core Book is a supplement in which everyday villagers become unlikely heroes, journeying through a perilous world using a simple, story‑driven 2d6 tag system.

== Reception ==
GamesRadar+ said that "Legend in the Mist's Tag-based system offers intense moments of character growth, putting incredible flourishes on press-your-luck mechanics to incentivise tough decisions that propel story arcs in inspired ways."

Polygon commented on its mechanics, saying "It's a profound change in the paradigm of tabletop role-play, a bold and intentional shift, and I think it might be one of the most interesting adaptations to come to TTRPGs in a long, long while."

PC Gamer said that "I think the designers behind Legend in the Mist might have come up with my favourite approach yet."

Legend in the Mist Core Book won the Gold ENNIE for "Best Art, Interior" and the Silver ENNIE for "Best Game" and "Best Rules", and was nominated for "Product of the Year" for the 2026 ENNIE Awards.
