= Johan Egerkrans =

Illustrator and author

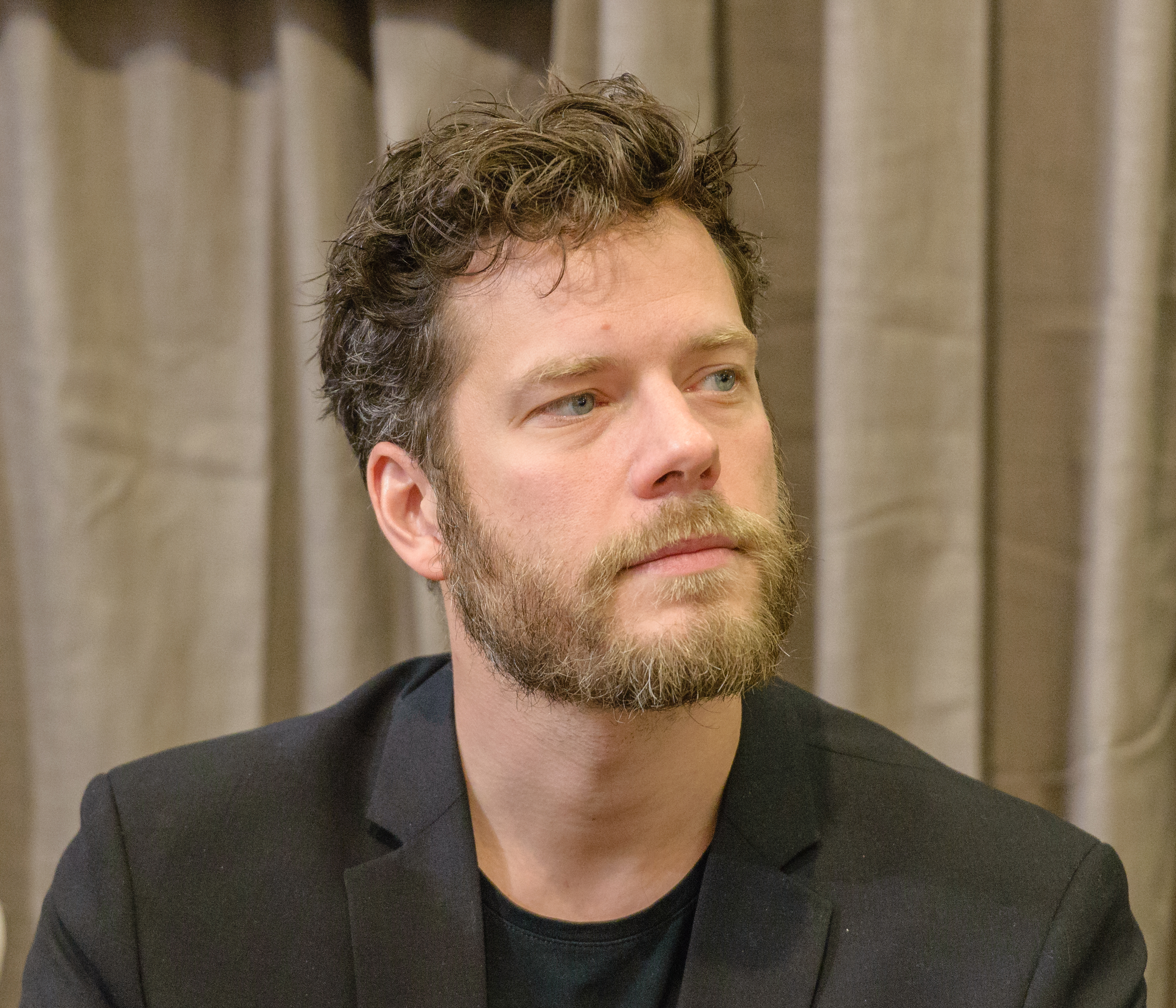
- Johan Egerkrans during the Göteborg Book Fair in September 2014
- Born: 22 March 1978
- Occupation: Illustrator, non-fiction writer, caricaturist
- Website: www.johanegerkrans.com

Johan Egerkrans (born 1978) is a Swedish illustrator and author.

== Career ==
Egerkrans has described himself as interested in mythology and animals from a young age. His first book as writer and illustrator, Nordiska Väsen, was published in 2013, and describes creatures from Nordic folklore. He has subsequently released other books, including Nordiska gudar, De odöda, and Drakar. He has also illustrated books by J. R. R. Tolkien, Astrid Lindgren, and Isaac Bashevis Singer.

In 2020, Nordiska Väsen was adapted into the table-top roleplaying game Vaesen by Free League Publishing. Egerkrans won awards for Best Cover Art, Best Interior Art, and Best Monster at the 2021 ENNIE Awards. Egerkrans also illustrated the new edition of the Swedish classic roleplaying game Drakar & Demoner/Dragonbane.

In 2021, Egerkrans was awarded the Elsa Beskow Plaque for his body of work. He has been called "a John Bauer in the 21st century".

== Select bibliography ==
- Nordiska Väsen, 2013, ISBN 978-91-32-16143-8 ; translated into English as Vaesen : spirits and monsters of Scandinavian folklore, 2017, ISBN 978-91-32-18194-8
- Nordiska gudar, 2016, ISBN 9789132164118 ; translated into English as Norse gods, 2017, ISBN 978-91-32-19814-4
- De Odöda, 2018, ISBN 9789132201776 ; translated into English as The Undead, 2018, ISBN 978-91-32-20801-0
- Drakar, 2021, ISBN 9789132213427 ; translated into English as Dragons, 2021, ISBN 978-91-32-21474-5
