= Ma Nishtana (game) =

2023 tabletop role-playing game

Why is this Night Different?
- Designers: Gabrielle Rabinowitz and Ben Bisogno
- Illustrators: Katrin Dirim
- Publication: 2023
- Genres: Tabletop role-playing game

Ma Nishtana: Why is this Night Different? is a Jewish tabletop role-playing game about the Passover Seder. The title is based on the Ma Nishtana section of the Seder. Players assume the roles of characters from the Book of Exodus. The game was written and designed by cousins Gabrielle Rabinowitz and Ben Bisogno. It was illustrated by Katrin Dirim. Ma Nishtana was published in 2023 after a successful Kickstarter campaign raised $8,042. It was nominated for two 2023 Indie Game Developer Network awards, "Best Rules" and "Best Art."

== Gameplay ==
Unlike typical tabletop role-playing games, Ma Nishtana does not use dice. Instead, it guides play through storytelling prompts and special character class moves. Players take turns assuming gamemaster responsibilities. Any player can interrupt and alter the story by calling out “Wait! Wait! Wait!” Every scene in the game includes a ritual component.

== Themes ==
Ma Nishtana focuses on themes of family, identity, and community struggles. The theme of plagues was inspired by both the Passover Seder and the COVID-19 pandemic, which had just begun when Rabinowitz and Bisogno began designing the game.
