= Shadowdark =

2023 tabletop role-playing game

- Designers: Kelsey Dionne
- Publication: 2023
- Genres: Tabletop role-playing game, fantasy
- Website: thearcanelibrary.com

Shadowdark is a dark fantasy tabletop role-playing game created by Kelsey Dionne and published in 2023 after raising 1.4 million dollars on Kickstarter. As part of the Old School Renaissance, it focuses primarily on dungeon crawling. It won four gold medals at the 2024 ENNIE Awards.

== Gameplay ==
Gameplay focuses on risk evaluation and problem-solving. Players generate character statistics and class abilities through randomized dice rolls. Shadowdark uses a 20-sided die for action resolution.

== Inspiration ==
In an interview with Rob Wieland for Forbes, Dionne explains, "There is a lot of gritty humanity to being a dungeon crawler with a sword and a torch who's only one mistake away from disaster. Unseen monsters, fading resources, the quest for treasure and glory... we understand these struggles implicitly because they are reflections of our daily lives."

== Reception ==
In a review of Shadowdark in Black Gate, Jeffrey Talanian said "This game looks wonderful, so far, and the production values are second to none. Thick, durable paper; library-sewn binding; clear, readable font selections with good white space. All these little things make for a better user experience."

Shadowdark won four gold medals at the 2024 ENNIE Awards: Product of the Year, Best Game, Best Layout and Design, and Best Rules. Rob Wieland for Forbes writes that Shadowdark has "become my first choice for down and dirty dungeon crawls".

Samantha Nelson for Polygon named Shadowdark as one of the best new tabletop RPG books of 2024, praising the variety of "tables for rolling up rumors, encounters, and loot, making it easy to pull together ideas for a quick adventure".
