= Fabula Ultima =

Fantasy tabletop role-playing game

- Designers: Emanuele Galletto
- Illustrators: Catthy Trinh, Moryo
- Publishers: Need Games
- Publication: 2023
- Genres: tabletop role-playing game, fantasy

Fabula Ultima is a fantasy tabletop role-playing game inspired by Japanese role-playing video games such as the Final Fantasy series. It was designed by Emanuele Galletto, illustrated by Catthy Trinh and Moryo, and published by Need Games in 2023. The game won 2023 ENNIE Awards for Best Game and Product of the Year.

== Gameplay ==
Fabula Ultima's dice mechanics were inspired by Ryuutama. Character abilities are described using an increasing die size—a d6 reflecting weakness, up to a d12 representing significant prowess—challenges are resolved with a dice pool composed of the dice of two stats, or of a single stat twice, and attempting to meet a given total. Character bonds, backstory, and themes can allow a player to reroll dice for better results.

== Reception ==
Fabula Ultima won two 2023 ENNIE Awards: the Gold ENnie for Best Game and the Silver ENnie for Product of the Year. Matt Jarvis for Dicebreaker called the game, "everything I could hope for from a Final Fantasy-like tabletop RPG." Alex Meehan for Dicebreaker named Fabula Ultima one of the best tabletop role-playing games to play in 2024.
