= Vaesen (role-playing game) =

Tabletop role-playing game

- Writers: Johan Egerkrans, Nils Hintze, Graeme Davis
- Publishers: Free League Publishing
- Publication: 2020
- Genres: tabletop role-playing game, horror, mystery

Vaesen is a horror mystery tabletop role-playing game published by Free League Publishing in 2020, with illustrations by Johan Egerkrans. It draws from mythology and folklore and focuses on monster-hunting. The game has won multiple ENNIE Awards.

== Publication history ==
Vaesen and its expansions are published by Free League Publishing. The base game by Nils Hintze is set in Sweden, while the "Mythic Britain and Ireland" expansion by Graeme Davis is set in England, Wales, Scotland, and Ireland. The "Mythic Britain and Ireland" expansion was funded on Kickstarter in December 2021. The "Lost Mountain Saga" expansion by Ellinor DiLorenzo, which returns to the core game's Swedish setting, was announced in June 2023.

== Etymology ==
The title Vaesen is a transliteration of the Swedish term väsen, meaning a supernatural being or creature in both singular and plural, where ae is the common international transliteration of the letter ä. It is cognate with the Danish and Norwegian terms væsen and vesen, which have the same meaning.

== Reception ==
Vaesen won three ENNIE Awards in 2021, including Gold ENnies for Best Art – Cover, Best Art – Interior, and Best Monster / Adversary. The Vaesen expansion Mythic Britain & Ireland won three ENnie Awards in 2023, including Gold ENnies for Product of the Year, Best Art – Interior, and Best Setting. The same year, Vaesen's "Seasons of Mystery" won Best Adventure.
