= UShip =

Texas-based Internet company

uShip Inc.
- Company type: Private
- Website type: Online services auction
- Available in: Multilingual
- Founded: 2003
- Headquarters: Austin, Texas, U.S.
- Area served: Worldwide
- Industry: Internet, Transport
- Website: www.uship.com
- Registration: Required to list, bid and transport items

uShip, Inc. is an Austin, Texas-based Internet company that operates uShip.com, an online marketplace for shipping services. Individuals and businesses post items they need shipped in a variety of categories, including auto transport, boat shipping, moving services, and the transport of heavy industrial equipment.

Transportation service providers on uShip place competing bids for hauling a customer's shipment. For some categories, including boats, autos and less-than-truckload (LTL) freight, customers can select an upfront quote for transport services or enter an acceptable price to be matched with a transporter. Customers can book a shipment immediately from these quotes or wait for auction bids.

== History ==
CEO and founder Matthew Chasen developed the business plan for uShip while enrolled in the MBA program at the University of Texas McCombs School of Business with co-founders Jay Manickam and Mickey Millsap. In 2004, the uShip team competed in several business competitions, winning first prize at the University of North Texas, and runner-up at the Venture Labs Investment Competition (formerly the US MOOT Corp Competition) in 2004. Shortly thereafter, uShip.com was launched in the United States and received funding from Benchmark Capital in 2005.

From 2012 to 2015, uShip became the subject of a reality television series aired by A&E known as Shipping Wars, which follows a group of independent shippers who compete to bid on and deliver shipments through uShip.

uShip has developed a Shipping Price Estimator, which provides estimates for transport services based on a weighted average of similar goods transported over similar distances on the uShip marketplace.

== Partnerships ==
In 2009, uShip entered a partnership with Ritchie Bros. Auctioneers, the world's largest auctioneer of heavy equipment, to provide real-time estimates and quotes for transportation of industrial equipment and vehicles being sold at auctions.

In 2011, eBay Motors began incorporating uShip's Shipping Price Estimator as a vehicle shipping option within all its U.S. auto, motorcycle and power sports listings.

== Awards and recognition ==
- Greater Austin Business Awards – Environment Category Winner (2011)
- Inc. 500 Fastest-Growing Private Companies (2010)
- Red Herring's North America 100 List (2010)
- Top Workplaces – Austin American Statesman (2010, 2011, 2012)

== See also ==
- Shiply
- AnyVan
- Reverse auction
