= ENNIE Awards =

Role-playing game awards

ENNIES
- Awarded for: Best role-playing games of previous year
- Country: United Kingdom & United States
- Presented by: Gen Con
- Formerly called: ENnie Awards
- First award: 2001
- Website: ennie-awards.com

The ENNIE Awards (previously stylized as ENnie Awards) are awards for role-playing game (RPG) products (including game-related accessories, publications, and art) and their creators. The awards were created in 2001 by Russ Morrissey of EN World in partnership with Eric Noah's Unofficial D&D Third Edition News. The ceremony has been hosted at Gen Con in Indianapolis since 2002. Since 2018, EN World is no longer associated with the awards.

The ENNIES comprise two rounds. In the first round, publishers submit their products for nomination. Entries are judged by five democratically elected judges. The nominated products are voted on by the public in the second round. Winners of the annual awards are then announced at a ceremony at Gen Con.

== History ==
The award ceremony initially focused on the d20 System products and publishers. It has come to include "all games, supplements, and peripheral enterprises". Since 2002, the awards have been announced at a live ceremony at Gen Con. It is now considered a "signature part" of the convention.

The nominees are chosen by a panel of judges, and the winners are voted on by the public and presented at an award show done in collaboration between Gen Con and EN World.

In 2007, the ENNIES were sponsored by the corporation Your Games Now, followed by Avatar Art in 2008. In 2010, 2011, and 2012, they were sponsored by both Indie Press Revolution and DriveThruRPG. From 2013 to 2016, they were sponsored by DriveThruRPG alone. In 2015, Campaign Coins made the medals as a sponsorship; Lone Wolf Development became a sponsor in 2017. The awards were run and owned by Morrissey until 2019.

In 2015, the awards disqualified the unofficially licensed Mass Effect RPG for copyright violations.

In 2020, Massif Press withdrew its RPG Lancer from the competition over a 2017 controversy, where a game module for the Lamentations of the Flame Princess system, titled "Blood in the Chocolate", received a Gold award in the Adventure category, despite being widely described as 'offensive', 'particularly icky', and 'simply ridiculous' by press, industry members and the publisher itself. Charlie Hall commented for Polygon in 2020:

The Ennies are unique among gaming awards. Judges are volunteers, who follow a strict set of ethical guidelines. Chief among them is the vow not to have any professional relationship with any RPG publisher in the lead up to the awards. They help ensure that the Ennies aren’t just a popularity contest by winnowing down the dozens upon dozens of submissions to only the very best. Once the short list has been created, voting on the final winners is open to all.

In 2026, the ENNIES introduced the "Best Solo Game" category.

== Categories ==
The ENNIE Awards bestow a Gold Winner and a Silver Winner for 1st and 2nd place winners, respectively. As of 2026, the current categories are:

- Judge's Spotlight
- Best Adventure - Long Form
- Best Adventure - Short Form
- Best Aid/Accessory - Digital
- Best Aid/Accessory - Non-digital
- Best Art, Cover
- Best Art, Interior
- Best Cartography
- Best Community Content
- Best Family Game/Product
- Best Free Game/Product
- Best Game
- Best Layout and Design
- Best Monster/Adversary
- Best Online Content
- Best Production Values
- Best RPG Related Product
- Best Rules
- Best Setting
- Best Streaming Content
- Best Solo Game
- Best Supplement
- Best Writing
- Product of the Year (first introduced in 2007 as Best Product)

== Winners by year ==
The categories change yearly, depending on the nominations.

- 2001 ENnie Award winners
- 2002 ENnie Award winners
- 2003 ENnie Award winners
- 2004 ENnie Award winners
- 2005 ENnie Award winners
- 2006 ENnie Award winners
- 2007 ENnie Award winners
- 2008 ENnie Award winners
- 2009 ENnie Award winners
- 2010 ENnie Award winners
- 2011 ENnie Award winners
- 2012 ENnie Award winners
- 2013 ENnie Award winners
- 2014 ENnie Award winners
- 2015 ENnie Award winners
- 2016 ENnie Award winners
- 2017 ENnie Award winners
- 2018 ENnie Award winners
- 2019 ENnie Award winners
- 2020 ENnie Award winners
- 2021 ENnie Award winners
- 2022 ENNIE Award winners
- 2023 ENNIE Award winners
- 2024 ENNIE Award winners
- 2025 ENNIE Award winners
- 2026 ENNIE Award winners
