= 2025 ENNIE Award winners =

Winners of the 2025 ENNIE awards

- Awarded for: Best roleplaying games of previous year
- Country: United States & United Kingdom
- Presented by: Gen Con
- First award: 2001

The following are the winners of the 25th annual ENNIE Awards, held in 2025.

== Spotlight awards ==
Judges' Spotlight Winners:

- Amelia Antrim – Punk is Dead: a post apocalyptic songwriting TTRPG, Critical Kit; Author: Tim Roberts
- Joe Blankenship– Letters from the Dark Vol. VIII: Lucky Stars, chrpow LLC; Author: Chris Powell
- Tom Cantwell – Let Us Build a Tower: A Mythic Bronze Age Adventure in Babel, Sojourn RPG Publishing; Author: Caleb Wimble
- Christopher Gath – Darkenhaven, Gooey Cube
- Clayton Notestine – Heroes of Cerulea, Bläckfisk Publishing; Author: Lucas Falk

== List of gold and silver winners ==
Category	Gold Winner	Silver Winner
Best Adventure - Long Form	The Shrike, Silverarm; Author: Leo Hunt	Crown of Salt, Tania Herrero; Author: Tania Herrero
Best Adventure - Short Form	The Dream Shrine, Brad Kerr; Authors: Brad Kerr and Skullfungus	The Mall Remastered, Space Penguin Ink LLC; Author: Goblin Archives
Best Aid/Accessory – Digital	Mothership: Companion App Virtual Tabletop, Tuesday Knight Games	Dungeon Scrawl, Dungeon Scrawl
Best Aid/Accessory – Non–Digital	Monty Python RPG – Head of Light Entertainment Gamemaster Screen, Exalted Funeral Press	The Map Library, Roll & Play Press and Venatus Maps
Best Art, Cover	MIR, Little Dusha; Artist: Metastazis	Yazeba’s Bed & Breakfast, Possum Creek Games; Artist: Katie Hicks
Best Art, Interior	Mythic Bastionland, Bastionland Press; Artist: Alec Sorensen	The Painted Wastelands, Agamemnon Press LLC; Artist: Tim Molloy
Best Cartography	The One Ring: Moria – Through the Doors of Durin, Free League Publishing; Francesco Mattioli	Pendragon: Map of King Arthur’s Britain, Chaosium, Inc.; Francesca Baerald
Best Community Content	Dead Beats (Miskatonic Repository); Author: David Kirkby	Sweet Dreams are Made of Geese (Dungeon Masters' Guild); Author: Jamie Chan
Best Family Game / Product	Land of Eem – Core Rulebook, Exalted Funeral Press; Author: Ben Costa and James Parks	Yazeba’s Bed & Breakfast, Possum Creek Games; Authors: Mercedes Acosta, Jay Dragon, Lillie J Harris, M Vaselak
Best Free Game / Product	Grimwild: Free Edition, Oddity Press; Author: J.D. Maxwell	TEETH: False Kingdom, Big Robot Ltd; Authors: Jim Rossignol, Marsh Davies
Best Game	Triangle Agency, Haunted Table; Author: Caleb Zane Huett, Sean Ireland; Art: Kanesha Bryant, Corviday, GC Houle, Ryan Kingdom, Kodesea, Nathan Rhodes, Michael Shillingburg; Layout/Design: Ben Mansky, Michael Shillingburg	His Majesty the Worm, Exalted Funeral Press; Author: Josh McCrowell; Art: Bertdrawstuff, Emily Cheeseman, Charles Ferguson-Avery, Nicolas Evans, Gobert, Sophie Grunner, Gus L, HodagRPG, Tom Kilian, Amanda Lee, Frank, Savanna Mayer, Thomas Novosel, Gertrud Oberg, Caitlin Reid, Marcin S, Alec Sorenson, Emmy Verte; Editing: Meledy Watson, Kennedy Gerber; Layout/Design: Peter Borlace, Michael Strange
Best Layout and Design	Mythic Bastionland, Bastionland Press; Chris McDowall	Wonderland: A Fantasy Role-Playing Setting, Andrews McMeel Publishing; Andrew Kolb
Best Monster/Adversary	Land of Eem – Bestiary Vol. 1, Exalted Funeral Press; Authors: Ben Costa, James Parks; Art: Ben Costa, Sean Kiernan, Alex Ahad, Ben Seto	BIG BADS Box Set, Hit Point Press; Authors: Jennifer Adcock, Nadine Amami, Keith Ammann, Charlotte Ashley, Beth Ball, Jasmine Bhullar, Andrea Bruce, David Castro, Ty Christensen, Yubi Coates, Ricardo Evangelho, Jess Go, Joshua Heath, Michael Hollik, Benjamin Huffman, Jay Jackson, Matt Key, Kat Kruger, Verity Lane, Jason Levine, Son M, Jessica Marcrum, Christopher L. Medina, Jake Michels, Christopher Pinch, Jordan Richer, TR Rowe, lan Spiegel-Blum, Lulu St. Janmes, Frederic Walker, Rob Wieland, KandiJ. Williams, Bailey Wright, Ty Christenstatt, Holly Conrad, Verity Lane, Christopher Pinch Jordan Richer, Theo Surette, Sebastian Yüe; Concepts: Rajaa Al-Subairi, Emily Beckett, Ty Christensen, Holly Conrad, Ricardo Evangelho, Graeme Fotheringham, Liam Gregg, Rosemarie Halim, Verity Lane, Christopher Pinch, Jordan Richer Meredith Smallwood, Theo Surette, Sebastian Yüe; Art: Rajaa A1-Subairi, Mark Behm, Elliot Bouriot, Shafer Brown, Justin Chan, Anna Christensen, Kayla Cline, Nicholas DeLuca, Lexxy Douglass, Isabela Duffles, Riley Easter, Kristina Gehrmann, IIse Gort, Dave Greco, Kelley Harris, Joel Holtzman, Avery Howett, Will Kirkby, Marby Kwong, Elliot Lang, Holly Lucero, Sam Mameli, Jen C. Marshall, Thabiso Mhlaba, Felix Miall, Jeff Miracola, Sean A. Murray , Kathleen O’Hara, Dimitrios Pantazis, Svetoslav Petrov, Brittany Pezillo, Federico Piatti, Dominique Ramsey, Jenn Ravenna, Jordan Richer, Henrik Rosenborg, Samantha Rustle, Axel Sauerwald, Faith Schaffer, Ameera Sheikh, Joe Slucher, Kim Sokol, Sovereign, Alex Stone, Mariah Tekulve, Sally Thordarson, Marija Tiurina, Lauren Walsh, Russell Werges, Yoshi Yoshitani, Nataly Zhuk, Josiah Cameron, Fez Inkwright, Steve Argyle, Mike Bakker, George Bennett, Andrea Bruce, Josiah o Cameron, Sidharth Chaturvedi, Hannah Comstock, Jessica Desjardin, Anna (Newt) Douaová, Jason Engle, Felipe Escobar, Jonathan Juanieve Fernandes, IIse Gort, Matt Harris, Ralph Horsley, Avery Howett, Fez Inkwright, Kurt Jakobi, Victoria Jeffery, Sara Katch, Shel Khan, Will Kirkby, Felix Klaer, Jack Kozita, Ashly Lovett, Barbara Lucas, Holly Lucero, Chuck Lukas, Andrew Mar, Gina Matarazzo, Julia Metzger, Jeff Miracola, Derek Murphy, Mythir, Alexander Ngo, Dimitrios Pantazis, Eleonor Piteria, Livia Prima, Jason Rainville, Jordan Richer, Izaak Rodriguez, Samantha Rustle, Daria ShestakOva, Joe Slucher, April Solomon, Alyse Stewart, Mariya Sviridova, Patricia Kelen Takahashi, Jarel Threat, Randy Vargas, Tyler Walpole, Brian Scot Walters, Anthony Scott Waters, Mark Zug; Co-op Student Artists: Rhoan Collins, Shauna-Lee Foster, Theo Surette
Best Online Content	One-Page RPG Jam, James Lennox-Gordon	Prismatic Wasteland Blog, Prismatic Wasteland
Best Production Values	Mothership: Deluxe Set, Tuesday Knight Games	Land of Eem Deluxe Box Set, Exalted Funeral Press
Best RPG Related Product	H.P. Lovecraft’s At the Mountains of Madness for Beginning Readers, Chaosium Inc.; Author: RJ Ivankovic	Prismatic Wisdom, Games Omnivorous; Author: WF Smith
Best Rules	Triangle Agency, Haunted Table; Authors: Caleb Zane Huett, Sean Ireland	His Majesty the Worm, Exalted Funeral Press; Author: Josh McCrowell
Best Setting	Call of Cthulhu – Cthulhu Ireland, Chaosium Community Content; Author: Colin Dunlop	RuneQuest: Lands of RuneQuest – Dragon Pass, Chaosium Inc.; Authors: Jeff Richard, Greg Stafford, Jason Durall
Best Streaming Content	Mystery Quest	Seth Skorkowsky (YouTube Channel)
Best Supplement	Mothership: Warden’s Operations Manual, Tuesday Knight Games; Author: Sean McCoy	The One Ring: Moria – Through the Doors of Durin, Free League Publishing; Author: Gareth Hanrahan
Best Writing	Triangle Agency, Haunted Table; Authors: Caleb Zane Huett, Sean Ireland	Monty Python’s Cocurricular Mediaeval Reenactment Programme, Exalted Funeral Press; Authors: Brian Saliba, Craig Schaffer; Editing: Chant Evans, Ben Summer
Product of the Year	The One Ring: Moria – Through the Doors of Durin, Free League Publishing	Mythic Bastionland, Bastionland Press
