= KViSR Rocks! =

Science role-playing game supplement

Cover art by Steve Huston, 1987

KViSR Rocks! is an adventure published by Leading Edge Games in 1987 for Living Steel, a post-apocalyptic cyberpunk role-playing game.

== Description ==
KViSR Rocks! is a scenario that describes Vissertown in detail, as well as the Vissers, people infected with a virus that renders them permanently incapable of existing in groups larger than a street gang without lashing out in mindless violence. The adventure also suggests options for diverging from the plot, and some suggestions of future uses for Vissertown in a longterm campaign are offered.

== Plot summary ==
The manager of Vissertown radio station KViSR hires the player characters to investigate a series of murders. It soon becomes apparent that the murders are part of an arcane ritual that must be stopped in order to save Vissertown.

== Publication history ==
Leading Edge Games released Living Steel in 1987, and as game historian Shannon Appelcline noted, "Leading Edge immediately supported Living Steel quite well with: the Operation Seven Swords sourcebook (1987), which gave even more depth to the history of the Seven Worlds; the KViSR Rocks! adventure (1987); and the High Tech Weapon Data Supplement (1987), all of which shared the high-tech Living Steel weaponry with Phoenix Command."

KViSR Rocks! is a 64-page saddle-stapled softcover book written by Barry Nakazono and David McKenzie, with interior artwork and graphic design by Jon Conrad, Toni Dennis, Nadir Elfarra, and Scott Miller, and cover art by Steve Huston.

== Reception ==
Stephan Wieck reviewed KViSR Rocks! in White Wolf #9 (1988), rating it a 9 out of 10 and stated that "Great attention is paid to the details of the adventure, and it also serves as a sourcebook on Visser behavior and types of Spectrals. It's worth price."

In the May 1988 edition of Dragon (Issue 133), Ken Rolston reviewed two Living Steel supplements, KViSR Rocks! and the Operation Seven Swords sourcebook, and commented that "These dramatic adventures are stylishly presented, and the theme and tone feature an appealingly ambivalent mixture of honorable heroism and grim cynicism... This is good stuff."

In Issue 33 of Challenge, Julia Martin liked the breadth of information about Vissertown and its inhabitants, but thought that more adventures should have been included to take advantage of all of this source material. Martin concluded, "The module could have been even more useful if more starting points/ideas for adventures were included."

== Other reviews ==
- Casus Belli #42 (Dec 1987, p. 16)
