= 2019 ENnie Award winners =

- Awarded for: Best role-playing games of previous year
- Country: United Kingdom & United States
- Presented by: Gen Con
- First award: 2001
- Website: Archive of 2019 ENnie Awards

The following are the winners of the 19th annual ENnie Awards, held in 2019:

== Judges' Spotlight winners ==
- Benjamin Adelman: The Stygian Library, Dying Stylishly Games, Author: Emmy Allen
- Christopher Gath: Archives of the Sky, Aaron A. Reed, Author: Aaron A Reed
- Alexander Holley: SIGMATA: This Signal Kills Fascists, Land of NOP LLC, Author: Chad Walker
- Brent Jans: plot ARMOR, Mostly Harmless Games, Author: DC
- Brian Nowak: The Elephant & Macaw Banner: Player’s Guide, Porcupine Publishing Author: Christopher Kastensmidt

== List of gold and silver winners ==
Category	Gold Winner	Silver Winner
Best Adventure	Masks of Nyarlathotep, Chaosium Inc. Authors: Larry DiTillio, Lynn Willis, Mike Mason, Lynne Hardy, Paul Fricker, Scott Dorward	Mothership: Dead Planet, Tuesday Knight Games Authors: Donn Stroud, Fiona Maeve Geist, Sean McCoy
Best Aid/Accessory – Digital	World Anvil Grandmaster Tier Worldbuilding & Campaign Management Platform, World Anvil LTD	Online Map Maker & Authoring Tool, DUNGEONFOG KG
Best Aid/Accessory – Non-Digital	Masks of Nyarlathotep Gamer Prop Set, The H. P. Lovecraft Historical Society Inc.	Dwarven Forge’s Dungeon of Doom Modular Terrain, Dwarven Forge
Best Art, Cover	Call of Cthulhu – Terror Australis 2nd Edition, Chaosium Inc. Artist: M. Wayne Miller	KULT: Divinity Lost, 4th Edition of KULT – Core Rules, Helmgast AB Artist: Bastien Lecouffe-Deharme
Best Art, Interior	RuneQuest: Roleplaying in Glorantha Slipcase Set, Chaosium Inc. Artists: Rick Becker, Bernard Bittler, Simon Bray, William Church, Miguel Coronado, Gene Day, Andrey Fetisov, Piotr Foksowicz, Lisa Free, Merle Insigna, Tomasz Jedruszek, Kalin Kadiev, Roman Kisyov, Rachel Kahn, Jennifer Lange, Rhonda Libbey, Michelle Lockamy	Symbaroum Monster Codex, Järnringen / Free League Publishing Artists: Martin Grip
Best Cartography	Forbidden Lands – Retro Open-World Survival Fantasy RPG, Free League Publishing Cartographers: Tobias Tranell and Nils Gulliksson	A New Map of Hot Springs Island, Swordfish Islands Cartographer: Jason Thompson
Best Electronic Book	Sly Flourish’s Return of the Lazy Dungeon Master, Last Word Audio Author: Michael E. Shea	Fear’s Sharp Little Needles, Stygian Fox Publishing Authors: Christopher Smith Adair, Joe Trier, Glynn Owen Barrass, Simon Brake, Stuart Boon, Chad Bowser, Brian Courtemanche, Scott Dorward, Adam Gauntlett, Allan Goodall, Helen Gould, Tyler Hudak, Jo Kreil, Jeff Moeller, Andi Newton, Oscar Rios, Brian M. Sammons, Matthew Sanderson, Jennifer Thrasher, Joe Trier, Jason Williams, Matt Wiseman, Simon Yee
Best Family Game / Product	Kids on Bikes, Renegade Game Studios/Hunters Entertainment Authors: Doug Levandowski and Jonathan Gilmour	Dinosaur Princesses, Ardens Ludere Authors: Hamish Cameron, Dana Cameron, Mary Rosalind Valentine
Best Free Game / Product	Ironsworn, Shawn Tomkin Author: Shawn Tomkin	The Ultraviolet Grasslands – Free Introduction, Hydra Cooperative Author: Luka Rejec
Best Game	Mothership Player's Survival Guide, Tuesday Knight Games Author: Sean McCoy	Dialect: A Game about Language and How it Dies, Thorny Games Authors: Kathryn Hymes and Hakan Seyalioglu
Best Layout and Design	Symbaroum Monster Codex, Järnringen / Free League Publishing – Johan Nohr	The Black Hack 2nd Edition, Squarehex – David Black
Best Monster/Adversary	Sandy Petersen’s Cthulhu Mythos for 5e, Petersen Games Author: Sandy Petersen	Creature Codex for 5th Edition, Kobold Press Authors: Wolfgang Baur, Dan Dillon, Richard Green, James Haeck, Jeremy Hochhalter, James Introcaso, Jon Sawatsky, Chris Harris
Best Online Content	Seth Skorkowsky, Seth Skorkowsky	The Alexandrian, The Alexandrian
Best Organized Play	Cypher Play Numenera Season 18-2: Building Amber Keep, Monte Cook Games – Sean K. Reynolds and Bruce R. Cordell	Minsc and Boo’s Guide to Stuff and Things, Adventure League Admins and Rich Lescouflair
Best Podcast	Ken and Robin Talk About Stuff	Red Moon Roleplaying
Best Production Values	Forbidden Lands – Retro Open-World Survival Fantasy RPG, Free League Publishing	Invisible Sun Black Cube, Monte Cook Games
Best RPG Related Product	Dark Adventure Radio Theatre: Masks of Nyarlathotep, The H. P. Lovecraft Historical Society Inc.	Miskatonic University: The Restricted Collection, Chaosium Inc.
Best Rules	Call of Cthulhu Starter Set, Chaosium Inc. Authors: Mike Mason, Paul Fricker, Lynne Hardy, Sandy Petersen, Lynn Willis	Forbidden Lands – Retro Open-World Survival Fantasy RPG, Free League Publishing Authors: Tomas Härenstam, Erik Granström, Christian Granath, Nils Karlén, Kosta Kostulas
Best Setting	The Fall of DELTA GREEN, Pelgrane Press Author: Kenneth Hite	Call of Cthulhu – Terror Australis 2nd Edition, Chaosium Inc. Authors: Penelope Love, Mark Morrison, Dean Engelhardt, Marion Anderson, Phil Anderson, Geoff Gillan, Richard Watts, Darren Watson, Vian Lawson, John Hughes, Tristan Goss, James Haughton, Sandy Petersen, Brian M. Sammons, with Mike Mason, Lynne Hardy
Best Supplement	The Glorantha Sourcebook, Chaosium Inc. Authors: Greg Stafford, Jeff Richard, Michael O’Brien, Sandy Petersen	The 7th Edition Guide to Cthulhu Invictus, Golden Goblin Press Authors: Oscar Rios, William Adcock, Stuart Boon, Chad Bowser, Charles Gerard, Jon Hook, Mike Mason, Jeffrey Moeller
Best Writing	Warhammer Fantasy Roleplay Core Rulebook, Cubicle Seven Entertainment Ltd. Authors: Dave Allen, Gary Astleford, Graeme Davis, Jude Hornborg, Andy Law, Lindsay Law, Andrew Leask, TS Luikart, Dominic McDowall, Clive Oldfield	KULT: Divinity Lost, 4th Edition of KULT – Core Rules, Helmgast AB Authors: Marco Behrmann, Martin Fröjdh, Ola Jentzsch, Robin Liljenberg, Petter Nallo, Andreas Nordlund, Krister Sundelin, Anton Wahnström
Product of the Year	Masks of Nyarlathotep Gamer Prop Set, The H. P.Lovecraft Historical Society Inc.	Forbidden Lands – Retro Open-World Survival Fantasy RPG, Free League Publishing
