= Alien: The Roleplaying Game =

Horror Role-playing game

Alien
The Role-Playing Game
- First edition cover art
- Designers: Brandon Bowling, Paul Elliott, Andrew E. C. Gaska, Tomas Härenstam, Nils Karlén, Kosta Kostulas, Dave Semark, and Matthew Tyler-Jones
- Publishers: Free League Publishing
- Publication: 2019
- Genres: Survival Horror
- Systems: Year Zero Engine
- Website: https://freeleaguepublishing.com/games/alien/

Alien: The Roleplaying Game is a science fiction horror role-playing game based on the Alien film franchise. It was published by Free League Publishing in 2019. The game has won three ENNIE Awards.

== Description ==
Alien is a role-playing game set in space in the far future that has two modes:

- Campaign: The usual role-playing milieu, where the gamemaster creates a "world" and a plot, then describes a situation or story hook to the players, who then indicate how their player characters react.
- Cinematic: The gamemaster presents a story, and the players play pregenerated characters within that story.

The game box comes with a large 392-page softcover book of rules, a Cinematic adventure titled "Chariots of the Gods", two sets of custom dice, a gamemaster's screen, and a deck of 50 custom cards.

=== Player characters ===
Players use a point-buy system to create characters, choosing from classes like frontier colonist, space trucker, colonial Marine, and company rep. They then buy specialized equipment from a pool of money.

=== Xenomorphs ===
Although there may be conflict with human or android non-player characters, the major opponents are the titular aliens, known within the game as "xenomorphs". There are many different types, each with special and deadly attacks that can overwhelm a single character or even a band of well-trained and well-armed marines. As critic Patricio Kobek noted, "players are not at the top of the food chain. They are, in every sense, the prey." However, Kobek noted that players should resist the temptation to create a combat-focused character, pointing out that "thirst, starvation, exhaustion, the vacuum of space, freezing, falling, explosions, fire, disease, radiation, drowning and synthetics are but a few of the other common ways to meet your end."

=== Gameplay ===
The game mechanics use a simple system of rolling several six-sided dice to resolve actions. If the player rolls a six on any of the dice, the character is successful. The more difficult the action, the fewer dice the player rolls, making rolling a six more unlikely. Panic and stress dice can modify possible successes or failures.

== Publication history ==
The film Alien was released in 1979, and was followed by several other movies in the franchise. The first role-playing game set in the Alien franchise was Aliens Adventure Game, released in 1991 by Leading Edge Games.

In 2019, a team of game designers including Brandon Bowling, Paul Elliott, Andrew E. C. Gaska, Tomas Härenstam, Nils Karlén, Kosta Kostulas, Dave Semark, and Matthew Tyler-Jones created Alien: The Roleplaying Game, which was then released by the Swedish publisher Free League.

The game was released in December 2019.

== Reception ==
Patricio Kobek, writing for The Gamer, commented that "Diehard fans of the original sci-fi space horror [movie] will immediately recognize the mood in this tabletop adaptation [...] it is as great as it is terrifying." He complimented the game for being able to "replicate this initial feeling of dread and the unknown in confined spaces, in this case in space, with players taking on a diverse cast of characters who do not always get along. Unlike Dungeons & Dragons, combat is the last thing one should seek out against the Alien, as it can rip through an unprepared party with little effort." Kobek concluded, "players who know what the Alien series entails from the original films will find the experience familiar, satisfying, and overall created with care and passion towards the source material."

Richard Jansen-Parkes, writing for Dicebreaker, was very impressed that this game was able to evoke the "creeping, slithering fear of the unknown" from the original movie. He noted that "Whether you’re running a one-off scenario as a bunch of hapless space-truckers or building an entire campaign for a band of roving explorers, the game excels at keeping the tension climbing to unbearable levels. When things are at their most fraught and unbearable, you can expect something terrible to happen." He liked the "nice and simple" core rules, and admired the stress dice mechanic, calling it "a great system that does an impressive job of cranking up the tension as the game builds towards its finale." He concluded, "If you dim the lights, stick some industrial clanging on the speakers and grab some friends for the evening you’re set up for something truly great."

Eeknight reviewed Alien: The Roleplaying Game for Black Gate, and stated that "The game itself is simple to understand yet is role-play heavy enough that seasoned gamers will enjoy it. I'll go a step beyond and say this would be an excellent game for introducing someone who has never played a tabletop roleplaying game to the hobby."

== Awards ==
Alien: The Roleplaying Game won the 2020 Gold ENnie Award for Best Game. ALIEN RPG: Building Better Worlds won the 2024 Gold ENnie Award for Best Supplement and the Silver for Best Cartography.
