= Fist (disambiguation) =

A fist is a hand with fingers curled into the palm and thumb retracted, displaying the knuckles.

Fist or FIST may also refer to:

- Fist (typography), the symbol ☞

== In arts and entertainment ==
- F.I.S.T. (film), a 1978 film (Federation of Interstate Truckers)
- F.I.S.T.: Forged In Shadow Torch, a 2021 Metroidvania video game
- FIST (role-playing game), a 2020 tabletop role-playing game
- Fist (band), a heavy metal band from the UK
- Fantasy Interactive Scenarios by Telephone, a series of single-player telephone-based roleplaying games
- Reverend Jeff "Fist" Fistwick, a recurring character in the TV series Ideal
- Monument to Joe Louis, also known as "The Fist", a 1986 public art sculpture in Detroit, Michigan

== In military use ==
- Forward observers in the U.S. military or Fire Support Teams (FIST), military artillery observers responsible for directing fire
- Future Integrated Soldier Technology, a project by the British Army to enhance infantry combat effectiveness

== Other uses ==
- Free Image Search Tool, a Wikimedia tool to search for free images to add to Wikipedia articles
- Fugitive Investigative Strike Team, a series of operations to capture violent fugitives between 1981 and 1986
- Fist, a telegraph key operator's identifiable style
- FiST, a common abbreviation for the Ford Fiesta ST

== See also ==
- Fisting, a sexual activity
- Fist bump, a gesture similar in meaning to a handshake or high five
- Fist pump, a celebratory gesture
- Iron Fist (disambiguation)
- Raised fist, a salute used by political and social activists
