= Sean McCoy =

American game designer

Sean McCoy is an American game designer, artist and writer.

His primary game works include Two Rooms and a Boom and the Mothership science fiction horror role-playing game (RPG) system. He also started the #Dungeon23. megadungeon writing challenge.

McCoy has written short horror fiction in print and online.

== Career ==
McCoy co-developed (with Alan Gerding) the social deduction game Two Rooms and a Boom, which launched with a six-figure Kickstarter campaign in 2013, which shipped in 2015.

McCoy wrote and illustrated the Mothership Player's Survival Guide, which was published in 2018. It won the 2019 ENNIE Award for Best Game. This version of Mothership was later renamed the "zeroth edition," or "0e." An updated Mothership Sci-Fi Horror RPG 1st Edition Boxed Set was launched in late 2021 with a seven-figure Kickstarter campaign, which shipped in early 2024.

McCoy has also written, edited, or illustrated a number of additional components of the Mothership RPG, including Dead Planet, which won the 2019 Silver ENNIE Award for Best Adventure. There is an active third-party supply of material for Mothership, and the Panic System mechanic developed for Mothership is now used by other RPGs.

McCoy writes about the gaming industry extensively on a blog and Substack newsletter, and has been quoted on the use of AI imagery in game publishing.
