= Andre Novoa =

Portuguese game designer (born 1985)

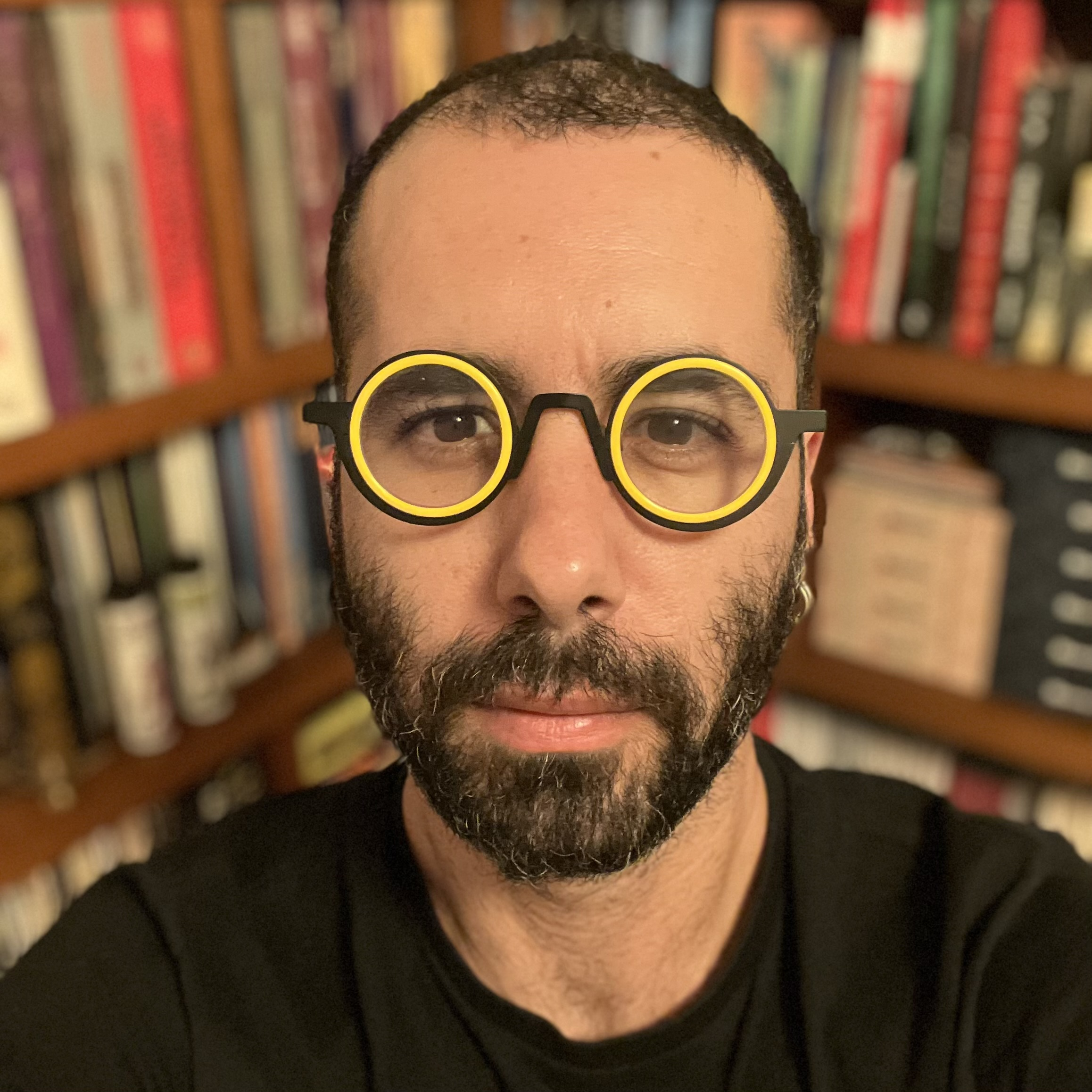
- Occupation: Game designer
- Years active: 2020–present

Andre Seabra Real Sampaio da Novoa is a Portuguese game designer, musician, and former cultural geographer. He has lived in the United States and the United Kingdom, and is currently based in Lisbon Portugal. He is the founder of Games Omnivorous, a publisher and design studio for tabletop role-playing games.

== Education ==
Novoa received a B.A. in history and a M.A. in anthropology from the University of Lisbon in 2009, where he studied bands and musicians on the road. In 2010, he moved to the United Kingdom where he completed a PhD in social and cultural geography at Royal Holloway, University of London supervised by Tim Cresswell with a critical analysis of mobility and social class in the European Union. For this work, he was the recipient of the award Best Young Anthropology by the Portuguese Association of Anthropology in 2018.

After that, Novoa has written about contemporary identities, extraterrestrial life, and space. He has worked in a major ERC academic grant called "The Colour of Labour", on how labour influences processes of racialization. As an anthropologist and geographer Novoa studied travels and considered them ritual passages for the researcher, concerning both a passage to participate in a foreign culture but also to becoming an established researcher".

== Game design ==
Novoa has written role-playing game (RPGs) books and modules since 2015. His work has been published in the US, Brazil and Europe. In 2020, he created Games Omnivorous, a brand based in Portugal that specialised in publishing minimalist and art-house games, including Death Robot Jungle, the first RPG setting in the format of a music LP vinyl, Vaults of Vaarn, Frontier Scum, Mausritter and other games and supplements. Since 2025, Games Omnivorous has operated as a game design studio led by Novoa, with his design work focused on The Job and FLAIL, alongside continued work as co-creator on Mausritter and Frontier Scum. He is the recipient of the 2020 Hartvig Award by Rolisboa, the Portuguese roleplaying convention.

The first RPG by Andre Novoa was 17th Century Minimalist (2020). Novoa was a designer of Death Robot Jungle (2020), a role-playing game setting on a record. Novoa and Manuel Pinheiro also created Putrescence Regnant (2021) for Mörk Borg, also on a vinyl record of yellow-and-black marbled wax. Novoa was also a designer of role-playing games that use hex-shaped tiles, called Undying Sands, Bottled Sea, and the Hexcrawl Toolbox (2023). Novoa wrote the minimalist one-shot heist role-playing game The Job.

Novoa's work has received multiple ENNIE Awards, including a Gold Award for Best Family Game/Product (2021) for Mausritter: Boxed Set, a Silver Award for Best Layout & Design (2023) for Frontier Scum, and a Silver Award for Best Aid/Accessory – Non-Digital (2024) for Hexcrawl Toolbox.

Novoa was part of the four-person creative team recognised with the Prémio Inovação em Banda Desenhada (Innovation in Comics Award) at the inaugural Prémio Nacional de Banda Desenhada in 2026, for Rumo ao Eclipse, a role-playing game based on a pre-existing comic book, published by Chili Com Carne.

== Music ==
Since his teens, Novoa has played in bands and toured Europe as the drummer for Susan Cadogan and Symarip. He was also one of the founders of Music With Soul Records, an indie label based in Amsterdam credited for the launch of Fumaça Preta, amongst others. More recently, he turned to sound design for board-games and role-playing games, collaborating with Portuguese musician and sound-designer Manuel Pinheiro under the guise of the Dead Robotz.

Nóvoa analyzed for the band The Stingers ATX and discovered how their mobility on tour "became a process of creating their identity as musicians".

== Politics ==
An activist since his youth, Novoa is one of the founding members of LIVRE, an eco-socialist political party in Portugal founded in 2014, which is committed to the Green New Deal and is the champion of minority rights in the country. He was a candidate to the European Parliament in the 2014 elections for the party, and a candidate to the Assembly of the Republic in the 2015 Portuguese legislative election.
