= Rhand: Morningstar Missions =

Rhand: Morningstar Missions is a 1985 role-playing game supplement for Phoenix Command published by Leading Edge Games.

== Contents ==
Rhand: Morningstar Missions is a supplement which details the world of Rhand, a formerly peaceful world until an alien attack caused an ice age, forcing the humans to fight back.

Rhand: Morningstar Missions presents a science-fantasy role-playing system where human survivors humans battle alien invaders known as Spectrals on a post-apocalyptic world. Using remnants of technology, they engage in combat that blends melee fighting and magic. The supplement contains rules for character development, medicine and skills, along with a starter adventure scenario to introduce players to the harsh, frozen world of Rhand.

Rhand: Morningstar Missions is set in a distant future where a once-scientific society has collapsed following a devastating apocalypse. Five centuries after this cataclysm, the planet Rhand is haunted by inhuman Spectrals, while some humans have been twisted into hostile Vissers or have turned traitor as Blades. The game blends science-fantasy elements, incorporating rules for magic.

== Publication history ==
Rhand: Morningstar Missions was written by edited by Barray Nakazono and Robert Calvet, and was published by Leading Edge Games in 1985 as a 104-page book.

Shannon Appelcline explained that two combat systems from different versions of LEG's Sword's Path: Glory "came together in Rhand: Morningstar Missions (1984), the company's first truly comprehensive RPG and its first focused setting." Appelcline noted that the magic rules for Rhand and many its other elements were originally planned to be used in volumes of Sword's Path: Glory which were never published, and felt that "the book showed LEG's future not just as a publisher of realistic combat systems, but also vibrant and original settings. We'll see these trends fulfilled in Leading Edge's second era of publication." Appelcline contended that Leading Edge's early publication history was defined by fantasy role-playing games such as Sword's Path: Glory and Rhand: Morningstar Missions. Appelcline noted that the Hand-to-Hand Combat System (1988) for Phoenix Command was responsible for "finally replacing older rules from Sword's Path: Glory or Rhand: Morningstar Missions". Appelcline also concluded that the company's next role-playing game, Living Steel "owed a lot to Rhand: Morningstar Missions" as it was set on Rhand hundreds of years before the previous version of the setting, when the Spectrals were just beginning their invasion of the planet.

== Reception ==
Rhand: Morningstar Missions was reviewed in Space Gamer/Fantasy Gamer No. 80. The reviewer commented that "Like the entire system, it's okay but nothing worth going out of your way to get."
