= 2023 Origins Award winners =

Winners of the 2023 Origins Awards

2023 Origins Awards
- Awarded for: Outstanding work in the gaming industry
- Location: Columbus, Ohio
- Presented by: Origins Game Fair
- First award: 1974
- Website: https://www.originsgamefair.com/origins-award-winners

The following are the winners of the 2023 annual Origins Awards, held in June 2024 at the Origins Game Fair. ICv2 noted that the categories "expanded substantially" to 24 whereas the previous year only had 16 categories; additionally, the "Retail Game of the year category was eliminated".

== Events ==
=== Fan Favorite ===
- Distilled (Paverson Games)

=== Academy of Adventure Gaming Arts & Design Hall of Fame ===
In 2023, the Academy of Adventure Gaming Arts & Design inducted three people and two games in their Hall of Fame:

- Martin Wallace (board game designer)
- Mark Rosewater (trading card game designer)
- Jeff Easley (artist)
- Cyberpunk RPG (R. Talsorian Games)
- 1829 (Lookout Games)

== Finalists and winners ==
Category	Finalists	Winner
Best Cooperative Board Game	Sail (Allplay); Kinfire Delve: Vainglory's Grotto (Incredible Dream); Tales from the Red Dragon Inn (SlugFest Games); Tesseract (Smirk & Dagger Games)	Sky Team (SCORPION MASQUE)
Best Gateway Board Game	Junk Drawer (25th Century Games); Prehistories Evolutions (25th Century Games); GAP (Arcane Wonders); Jokkmokk: The Winter Market (WizKids)	Wandering Towers (Capstone Games)
Best Light Strategy Game	Match of the Century (Capstone Games); 3 Ring Circus (DEVIR GAMES); Cosmoctopus (Lucky Duck Games); In the Footsteps of Darwin (Sorry We Are French)	Leaf (Weird City Games)
Best Thematic Board Game	Kinfire Chronicles: Night's Fall (Incredible Dream); Distilled (Paverson Games); Thunder Road: Vendetta (Restoration Games); The Stifling Dark (Sophisticated Cerberus Games)	Freelancers: A Crossroads Game (Plaid Hat Games)
Best Heavy Strategy Game	Age of Innovation (Capstone Games); Ark Nova: Marine Worlds (Capstone Games); Kutna Hora: The City of Silver (Czech Games Edition); The Search for Lost Species (Renegade Game Studios)	Dune: Imperium - Uprising (Dire Wolf)
Best Party/Social Board Game	Fiction (Allplay); Ensemble (Ares Games); CDSK (hachette/Randolph); Inside Job (Kosmos)	Smug Owls (Runaway Parade Games)
Best Solo Board Game	Resist! (25th Century Games); 20 Strong (Chip Theory Games)	Legacy of Yu (Renegade Game Studios)
Best Children's & Family Board Game	CRANIUM Hullabaloo (Funko/R&CPMK); Turbo Kidz (SCORPION MASQUE); One Too Many Rabbits (Three Archers Games); Sushi Boat (Japanime Games)	Diced Veggies (KTBG)
Best Fixed Constructible Game	Ivion: The Rune and the Rime (APE Games & Luminary Games); Mage Noir (Double Combo Games); Flesh and Blood: History Pack 1 Blitz Decks (Legend Story Studios); Magic: The Gathering Universes Beyond - The Lord of the Rings: Tales of Middle-Earth Starter Kit (Wizards of the Coast)	Magic: The Gathering Universes Beyond - The Lord of the Rings: Tales of Middle-Earth Commander Decks (Wizards of the Coast)
Best Randomized Constructible Game	Flesh and Blood: Bright Lights Booster Box (legend Story Studios); Nostalgix Harmonic Surge (Nostalgix TCG)	Magic: The Gathering Universes Beyond The Lord of the Rings: Tales of Middle-Earth Collector Booster (Wizards of the Coast)
Best Miniatures Game Product	Marvel Crisis Protocol: Earth's Mightiest Core Set (Atomic Mass Games); Conquest: City States vs. Nords (Para Bellum Games); Conquest: First Blood Warband (Para Bellum Games); Dungeons & Dragons: Onslaught (WizKids)	Star Wars: Shatterpoint (Atomic Mass Games)
Best Puzzle Game	Mother of Frankenstein (Arcane Wonders); EXIT: The Professor's Last Riddle (Kosmos)	Threads of Fate (Post Curious)
Best Role-playing Game Adventure	Doctors and Daleks: The Keys of Scaravore (Cubicle 7 Entertainment); The One Ring: Tales from the Lone Lands (Free League Publishing); Vaesen - Lost Mountain Saga (Free League Publishing); Fallout The Role Playing Game: Winter of Atom (Modiphius Entertainment)	Heckna! Deluxe Box Set (Hit Point Press)
Best Role-playing Game Core Product	Avatar Legends: The Roleplaying Game Core Book (Magpie Games); Marvel Multiverse Role-Playing Game: Core Rulebook (Marvel); Star Trek Adventures: Captain's Log (Modiphius Entertainment); The Devil's Dandy Dogs (Monte Cook Games)	DIE: The Roleplaying Game (Rowan, Rook and Decard)
Best Role-playing Game Starter Product	Critical - Sanctuary Season 1 (Gigamic); Avatar Legends: The Roleplaying Game Starter Set (Magpie Games)	Dreams and Machines: Starter Set (Modiphius Entertainment)
Best Role-playing Game Supplement	Uncharted Journeys (Cubicle 7 Entertainment); The Griffon's Saddlebag Book 2 (Hit Point Press); Avatar Legends: Wan Shi Tong's Adventure Guide (Magpie Games); The Weird (Monte Cook Games)	Dune: Power and Pawns (Modiphius Entertainment)
Best Dice/Dice Related Accessory	Gemini Purple-Teal/Gold Mini Polyhedral 7-Die Set (Chessex Manufacturing); Puzzle Cube Dice (Foam Brain Games); Hecknal Popcorn Dice & Bag (Hit Point Press); If I Were a Lich, Man - Dreidel Set (Hit Point Press)	Glyphic Blind Dice Bags Series 3.5 (Level Up Dice)
Best Game Accessory	Pollen: Glass Insect Beads (Allplay); Inkwell Trackers (Foam Brain Games)	Frameamajigs (Hit Point Press)
Best Role-playing Game Related Accessory	ENHANCE Potion Light (AP Global); Traveler's Trinkets (Foam Brain Games); Calendar of Many Adventures 2024 (Loke Battle Mats); Dreams and Machines RPG: GM's Toolkit (Modiphius Entertainment)	D&D Icons of the Realms: Adventure in a Box - Mind Flayer Voyage (WizKids)
Best 2D Artwork	Empire's End (Brotherwise Games); The Weird (Monte Cook Games); Necrobiotic (Penny for a Tale); Lost Ruins of Arnak: The Missing Expedition (Czech Games Edition); Holler RPG (Pinnacle Entertainment Group)	Kwanchai Moriya, Empire's End (Brotherwise Games)
Best 3D Component	Omicron Protocol - Lady Rose 75mm Model (Dead Alive Games); Pericle, the Gathering Darkness - standees (Long Dog Games)	Threads of Fate - Puzzle Box (Post Curious)
Best Game Related Writing	Luke Stratton, Pirate Borg (Limithron); Donald Shults and Mr. Bistro, Freelancers: A Crossroads Game (Plaid Hat Games)	Grace Collins, Shadow in the Night Part 2, Cozy Companion Magazine (Snowbright Studio)
Best Media Production	Oxventure One-Shot of Teatime Adventures: The COSIEST RPG by Snowbright Studio; Moe Tousignant with The Tabletop Bellhop Gaming Podcast; TheRathole.ca Review of Doctor Who the Roleplaying Game - Sixty Years of Adventure by Cubicle Seven; Board Game Quest for Frosthaven Review by Brandon Bryson	Eleni Papadopoulou, Making Board Games - The CGE Documentary (8-Part Series)
