= Phoenix Command Special Weapons Weapon Data Supplement =

Phoenix Command Special Weapons Weapon Data Supplement is a 1989 role-playing game supplement published by Leading Edge Games for Phoenix Command.

== Contents ==
Phoenix Command Special Weapons Weapon Data Supplement is a supplement in which rules and statistics are expanded for a wide array of unconventional modern weapons—from riot‑control gear and incendiaries to archery equipment, stealth weapons, and other specialized military systems.

== Reviews ==
- Abyss #44
- Games Review (Volume 2, Issue 3 - Dec 1989)
