= Operation Seven Swords =

Role-playing game supplement

Operation Seven Swords is a 1987 role-playing game supplement for Living Steel, a post-apocalyptic cyberpunk role-playing game set on several different worlds, published by Leading Edge Games.

== Contents ==
Operation Seven Swords is a supplement which details the army known as the Seven Legions of the Seven Worlds.

== Reception ==
Stephan Wieck reviewed Operation Seven Swords in White Wolf #9 (1988), rating it an 8 out of 10 (necessary material) and stated that "The material in this book is a must. The only possible reason that it was left out of the boxed set is that there wasn't enough room."

In the May 1988 edition of Dragon (Issue 133), Ken Rolston liked the entire Living Steel setting, commenting that "These dramatic adventures are stylishly presented, and the theme and tone feature an appealingly ambivalent mixture of honorable heroism and grim cynicism... This is good stuff."

In issue No. 33 of Challenge magazine, Julia Martin found that "Operation Seven Swords is well-written and useful. In fact, it is so useful, one wonders why the information included in it was not included in Living Steel."

== Other reviews ==
- Casus Belli #42 (Dec 1987)
