= Into the Odd =

Tabletop role-playing game

- Into the Odd Remastered cover art by Johan Nohr
- Designers: Chris McDowall
- Illustrators: Johan Nohr (Remastered)
- Publishers: Free League Publishing
- Publication: 2014 (original); 2021 (Remastered)
- Genres: Fantasy; Horror

Into the Odd is a tabletop role-playing game created by Chris McDowall. Originally released in 2014, the game received a new version titled Into the Odd Remastered after a Kickstarter crowdfunding campaign in 2021, and was published by Free League Publishing, with graphic design and new art done by Johan Nohr.

Into the Odd uses a lightweight ruleset inspired by the Old-School Renaissance, and has been the basis of other role-playing games such as Electric Bastionland, Mythic Bastionland, Cairn, and Mausritter.

== Overview ==
The game is set in a fantasy world that has reached an industrial age, and centers around a large city called Bastion, described as "the only city that matters". Players take on the role of adventurers who explore ruins beneath or beyond Bastion (such as in The Underground that stretches below the city's tunnels and sewers, or the abandoned wilderness known as the Deep Country), many of which were left behind by ancient or even alien civilizations. The setting is otherwise not described in extensive detail, but is instead implied through the rules themselves (for example, by the presence of firearms as equipment characters can buy) and through the use of random rolling tables.

Player characters have three stats (Strength, Dexterity, and Willpower) as well as HP (which stands for Hit Protection). Whenever a character tries to avoid a detrimental effect, they roll a d20, looking for a result equal to or lower than one of their statistics. In combat, attacks always hit - players only roll to see how much damage they deal. Character creation is randomized - players roll to determine their starting attributes and HP, which corresponds to a starting set of equipment and abilities.

Characters can also gain access to arcana, strange and highly sought-after magic items. Arcana are broken up into three tiers (including greater and legendary), and their effects are mostly described in narrative rather than mechanical terms.

== Reception ==
Writing for Dicebreaker, Chase Carter praised the game's simple rules, quick character creation, and evocative worldbuilding saying that "its subtle satire of both its setting and the RPG power fantasy helps it stand out from amongst its peers."

== Related works ==
=== Bastionland games ===
Into the Odd shares its setting with those of Chris McDowall's other games centered around the city of Bastion, including Mythic Bastionland and Electric Bastionland, as well as the upcoming Intergalactic Bastionland.
