= Pirate Borg =

2023 tabletop role-playing game

Cover of Pirate Borg

Pirate Borg is a tabletop role-playing game (TTRPG) published by Free League Publishing. It adapts the rules-light, Old School Renaissance (OSR) role-playing game system Mörk Borg into a pirate-themed Caribbean fantasy setting.

Pirate Borg was written and illustrated by game designer Luke Stratton under the Limithron label. The game originated as an independent Kickstarter project before Free League became involved in its publication and distribution through its Free League Workshop sublabel.

In Pirate Borg, players explore a grim setting known as the Dark Caribbean, where pirates contend with undead horrors and other supernatural threats across haunted seas and jungles. The game was a finalist for Best Game Related Writing at the 2023 Origins Awards.

== Overview ==
According to the game's creator, Luke Stratton, Pirate Borg is "a game about grog-swilling pirates, undead galleons, arcane treasures found in ancient temples, and high seas adventure."

Stratton describes the setting as fantasy-driven pirate fiction rather than historical simulation, drawing inspiration from pirate myth, folklore, and adventure stories. The undead play a central role in the game, as does a magical substance called ash, which can cause both negative and positive effects for player characters. The system is notable for ship-to-ship combat rules that allow players to collaboratively control a vessel during encounters.

== Publication history ==
Pirate Borg was funded through a Kickstarter campaign that raised over US$161,303 from more than 4,076 backers.

The game was released by Free League Publishing on 19 September 2023, following the crowdfunding campaign.

Pirate Borg has achieved Platinum Best Seller status on DriveThruRPG, a popular tabletop gaming marketplace.

In 2024, an additional Kickstarter campaign was launched for the expansion project Pirate Borg: Down Among the Dead, further expanding the game's product line.

Most recently, in 2026, on Free RPG Day, Terror in Tortuga was published, leading to more discoveries of Pirate Borg.

== Reception ==
Pirate Borg has received generally positive coverage from tabletop role-playing game reviewers, with praise directed toward its presentation, tone, and mechanical support for nautical horror campaigns.

GamingTrend described the game as a complete and flexible system for running swashbuckling campaigns in a dark Caribbean setting, noting its expansion of the Mörk Borg ruleset to better support naval adventure and exploration.

Geek to Geek Media characterized Pirate Borg as "surreal, dark, and incredibly fun", citing its accessibility, replayability, and balance between deadly mechanics and thematic flavor.

Sprites and Dice reviewed both the core rulebook and associated bestiary, praising the game's monster design, encounter tools, and overall usability for game masters.

Forbes included Pirate Borg in a list of notable tabletop role-playing game products of 2023, citing its distinctive tone and strong reception within the indie RPG space.

== See also ==
- Mörk Borg
- Tabletop role-playing game
- Old School Renaissance
- Origins Award
