= Blade Runner: The Roleplaying Game =

Tabletop role-playing game

- Publishers: Free League Publishing
- Publication: 2023
- Genres: Tabletop role-playing game, science fiction
- Players: 2-5
- Age range: 16+

Blade Runner: The Roleplaying Game is a science fiction tabletop role-playing game based on the Blade Runner film franchise. It was published by Free League Publishing in 2023.

== Premise ==
The game is set in Los Angeles in the year 2039, partway between first film (set in 2019) and the second (set in 2049). It focuses upon complex stories with themes of fragile humanity and moral ambiguity. Players typically play" "blade runners" employed by the Los Angeles Police Department. Blade Runner: The Roleplaying Game won two ENNIE Awards in 2023: "Best Layout and Design" and "Best Cartography."

== Gameplay ==
The RPG uses a version of Free League Publishing's Year Zero Engine, which also provides the structure for Free League's Alien RPG. The game includes game mechanics for chase scenes on foot and in various vehicles. Adventures typically follow the form of detective stories.

== Publication history ==
The game was published by Free League Publishing in 2023 after the Swedish company's successful Kickstarter campaign raised SEK 16,513,148. The game reached its initial funding goal in three minutes.

== Expansion ==
An expansion for Blade Runner: The Roleplaying Game called Replicant Rebellion was funded on Kickstarter in 2024, raising SEK 4,624,265. In the expansion, player characters join an underground organization that fights for the liberty of replicants.
