= Tim Cresswell =

British human geographer and poet

Tim Cresswell, FBA, (born 1965) is a British human geographer and poet. Cresswell is the Ogilvie Professor of Human Geography at the University of Edinburgh having formerly served as the Dean of the Faculty and Vice President for Academic Affairs at Trinity College, Hartford, Connecticut.

== Background ==
Cresswell was an 'airforce kid' and was educated at Woolverstone Hall School near Ipswich, a boarding school founded by London County Council (it closed in 1990). He studied geography at University College London and a PhD at University of Wisconsin Madison (1986-1992) where he was supervised by the noted geographer, Yi-Fu Tuan. His doctoral thesis was later made into a book (Cresswell, 1996). He spent most of the early part of his career teaching geography in Wales, at University of Wales, Lampeter before the well-known Geography Department was closed, and University of Wales Aberystwyth (1999-2006), before moving to Royal Holloway (until 2013: he also has a second PhD in creative writing from the university supervised by poet Jo Shapcott). From 2013 to 2016 he held an interdisciplinary professorship at Northeastern University in Boston, before moving into an administrative role as Dean and VP at a private liberal arts college, Trinity College in Hartford, CT. He resigned in 2019 to move back into research as the Ogilvie Chair at the University of Edinburgh. In 2025 he was elected as a Fellow of the British Academy (FBA).

== Contributions ==
Cresswell is the author of six books on the role of place and mobility in cultural life, co-editor of four collections and was an inaugural managing editor of the journal, "GeoHumanities". Cresswell is a leading figure in the mobilities paradigm. In general, his work explores the role of place and mobility in the constitution of social and cultural life.

He is also a poet and the author of three collections published by Penned in the Margins "Soil" (2013), "Fence" (2015) and "Plastiglomerate" (2020). "Fence" was a result of Cresswell's participation in the artist Alex Hartley's nowhere island project.

== Publications ==
- (2026) The Citizen and the Vagabond: A Politics of Mobility
- (2024) Geographic Thought: A Critical Introduction (Second Edition)
- (2022) Muybridge and Mobility (co-written with John Ott and in introduction by Anthony W. Lee)
- (2021) Moving Towards Transition: Commoning Mobility for a Low Carbon Future (co-written with Peter Adey, Jane Yeonjae Lee, Anna Nikolaeva, Andre Novoa, Cristina Temenos)
- (2020) Plastiglomerate (poetry)
- (2019) Maxwell Street: Thinking and Writing Place
- (2015) "Ne pas dépasser la ligne! Fabrique des identités et contrôle du mouvement dans les lieux de transit (with Geraldine Lay and Mikaël Lemarchand)
- (2015) Fence (poetry)
- (2014) Place: An Introduction (Second Edition)
- (2013) Soil (poetry)
- (2013) Geographic Thought: A Critical Introduction
- (2012) Geographies of Mobilities: Practices, Spaces, Subjects (co-edited with Peter Merriman)
- (2008) Gendered Mobilities (co-edited with Tanu Priya Uteng)
- (2006) On the Move: Mobility in the Modern Western World
- (2004) Place: A Short Introduction
- (2002) Mobilizing Place, Placing Mobility (co-edited with Ginette Verstraete)
- (2002) Engaging Film: Geographies of Mobility and Identity (co-edited with Deborah Dixon)
- (2001) The Tramp in America
- (1996) In Place/Out of Place: Geography, Ideology and Transgression University of Minnesota Press

== See also ==
- Human geography
- Geography of media and communication
- Lampeter Geography School
