= FIST (role-playing game) =

Indie tabletop role-playing game

FIST - Freelance Infantry Strike Team
- Ultra Edition cover
- Publishers: Claymore Roleplaying Games
- Publication: 2020 (Classic); 2023 (Ultra Edition)
- Genres: Paranormal; Military; Espionage
- Systems: Powered by the Apocalypse, Old School Renaissance

FIST, short for Freelance Infantry Strike Team, is an indie tabletop role-playing game created by B. Everett Dutton, first published by Claymore in 2020, with an expanded 'Ultra Edition' released in 2023. Inspired by Metal Gear Solid, The A-Team, and Doom Patrol, the players of FIST take on the roles of paranormal mercenaries in the employ of the titular mercenary unit, who are "uniquely equipped for covert and unusual operations" across the world during the Cold War.

== Gameplay ==
In FIST, players create their characters by choosing or randomly rolling for a combination of over 200 possible traits that grant them unique benefits and abilities, change their four statistics (Forceful, Tactical, Creative, and Reflexive), and grant them starting equipment (whether by manually choosing or rolling for them randomly) - some examples of possible traits include being Radioactive, a Janitor, or possessing many Limbs.

Additionally, they choose or roll for one of over 30 possible roles, which describe their character's goals and motivations, and which allow the character to advance after completing missions (for example, a Dealmaker advances if they complete a mission with more wealth or influence than they started with).

Similarly to Powered by the Apocalypse games, actions are resolved through rolls of two six-sided dice and modifiers (with four possible results of failure, partial success, success, and ultra success). Player characters also have a limited supply of War Dice, which can be added to any dice roll in the game (not just players' own action rolls).

In a manner similar to OSR games, the game does not provide a canon description of the campaign setting, instead offering an 'Intelligence Matrix' of rolling tables that the referee can use to generate mission prompts, nonplayer characters, locations, and events. However, a likely recurring antagonist is the rival paramilitary organization Cyclops, vastly superior in influence and resources to FIST, who will often deploy teams of Cyclops Recon Operations (CROs) against the player characters.

== Publication history ==
The original (or Classic) version of the game was released in 2020, while a Kickstarter campaign for an expanded Ultra Edition boxed set ran in 2023.

Throughout 2022 and 2023, Claymore released Rations, a series of six pamphlet supplements, featuring new rules, missions, and enemies.

Mandelbrot Set, a module inspired by Roadside Picnic and Annihilation and set in a Nevada paranormal zone, was originally released in 2022, with an Ultra Edition update and expansion in 2025.

== Reception ==
In 2023, FIST was one of the 20 winners of The Awards.

In his review of the Ultra Edition, Ben Milton stated that "if you like Powered by the Apocalypse games but want something a little bit lighter, without lots of complex moves to keep track of, [if] you want something faster, more deadly, more in the OSR style, I think this could be a really good option," praising the game's fast and straightforward rules and large amount of GM tools.

Writing for Cannibal Halfling Gaming, Seamus Conneely thinks "it's just really neat that a game focusing on Cold War mercenaries is using an aesthetic that's in line with other games published during the Cold War," in reference to the game's art and layout. When talking about the game's character creation, he says he "could roll up characters for this game forever, quite possibly literally, it's practically a game in and of itself."

Writing for Forbes, Rob Wieland states that FIST "feels like an excellent fit for any media where weird heroes encounter strange problems and fix them with unusual solutions", praising the game's quick and evocative character creation, and that "[the] ease of making characters also means that game masters don't have to pull any punches when the story hits hard. If the assault mech crushes the amateur medic, that player will have a new character on the scene in moments. That might even become a story beat as the survivors track down the drop point and any players who saw their superweirdos die receive fresh new ones fall from the sky."

== Related works ==
The rules text of FIST is available under a Creative Commons license, and a number of "Compatible with FIST" supplements have been created by the game's community.

=== The House Edge ===
The Kickstarter campaign for the satirical horror RPG Triangle Agency featured a stretch goal for a crossover module with FIST called The House Edge, starring the two games' titular paranormal organizations. Eventually, the project evolved into a standalone game based on the rules of FIST, released for playtesting in 2026.

In The House Edge, FIST operatives infiltrate the Triangle Agency's facility known as the Vault, randomly constructed in each playthrough from a deck of playing cards.

=== Planet Fist ===
A standalone satirical science-fiction role-playing game (self-described as a "narrative wargame") based on FIST, Planet Fist (stylized as PLANET FIST) was created by Jess Levine and published in 2023 after an Itch.io crowdfunding campaign. Inspired by media such as Planetside 2 and Starship Troopers, the game is set in the far future on the distant planet of Sixaura, eternally warred over by three empires - the New Committee, the Tyrat Council, and the Velian Ascendancy - who use advanced nanite and cloning technology to continuously replicate the fighting soldiers.

=== War-Torn Ice Moon ===
In early 2025, X user lolt64 began posting about an upcoming RPG zine project of his, describing an endless war on Jupiter's icy moon Europa (from a black comedy, in-character perspective). In the following months, other users would participate with their own writing and artwork (often likened to collaborative projects such as the SCP Foundation and The Backrooms), including a post by the official NASA-ran Europa Clipper account indirectly referencing the phenomenon.

Eventually, lolt64 would come forward clarifying the matter, settling on using FIST as the game to release the project (named War-Torn Ice Moon) for, with a Kickstarter campaign to fund the campaign kit in September 2025, releasing to the public in September 2026.
