= Coriolis: The Great Dark Core Rulebook =

Coriolis: The Great Dark Core Rulebook is a 2025 role-playing game supplement published by Free League Publishing for Coriolis: The Great Dark.

== Contents ==
Coriolis: The Great Dark Core Rulebook is a supplement in which Explorers venture from a dying Ship City into Blight‑tainted ruins and the perilous Slipstream to uncover ancient secrets that may unlock a future beyond the fading star portals.

== Publication history ==
A quickstart version was released in 2024. Coriolis: The Great Dark Core Rulebook was released in August 2025.

== Reception ==
Coriolis: The Great Dark Core Rulebook was nominated for "Best Game" and "Product of the Year" for the 2026 ENNIE Awards.
