= Deborah Dixon =

British geographer

Deborah P. Dixon
- Citizenship: British
- Education: University of Kentucky; University of Wisconsin-Madison; University of Cambridge
- Known for: Feminist geopolitics; Geohumanities
- Scientific career
- Fields: Geography; Feminist geopolitics; Geohumanities
- Workplaces: University of Glasgow; Aberystwyth University; East Carolina University
- Website: www.gla.ac.uk/schools/ges/staff/deborahdixon/

Deborah P. Dixon is a British geographer and professor of geography at the University of Glasgow. She is recognized for her contributions to feminist geopolitics. Dixon serves as the deputy head of school at the School of Geographical and Earth Sciences at Glasgow University. Her research spans environmental issues, art-science collaborations, and geopolitical theory, with a particular focus on feminist perspectives and interdisciplinary approaches.

== Early life and education ==
Dixon received her undergraduate degree from the University of Cambridge, followed by a Master's degree from the University of Wisconsin-Madison where she completed a thesis on cholera in British India. She earned her PhD from the University of Kentucky with a thesis on the political reanimation of regions.

== Career ==
Dixon began her academic career at East Carolina University, where she researched rural geographies of marginal economies and the experiences of migrant women. She later returned to the United Kingdom to work at Aberystwyth University, where she became a reader in 2010 and was promoted to professor in 2012. In 2012, she moved to the University of Glasgow as professor of geography in the School of Geographical and Earth Sciences. As of 2025, she serves as the Deputy Head of School at Glasgow University.

Throughout her career, Dixon has maintained collaborative research relationships with colleagues at institutions including the University of Arizona, East Carolina University, the University of Texas-Austin, San Diego State, the University of Toronto, and the University of Wisconsin-Madison.

== Research ==
Dixon's research spans several interconnected areas including feminist geopolitics, geohumanities, environmental issues, and art-science collaborations.

=== Feminist geopolitics ===
Dixon is an internationally recognized scholar in feminist geopolitics. Her book Feminist Geopolitics: Material States (2016) explores how feminist imaginaries of Self, Other, and Earth reconfigure understandings of geopolitics. The book examines four objects of analysis: flesh, bone, touch, and abhorrence, grounded through globally diverse case studies. Her work in this area has been described as a "transformative contribution to both geopolitical and feminist thought" by Sallie Marston of the University of Arizona.

Her feminist geopolitical research has resulted in numerous publications, including a special issue introduction co-authored with Sallie Marston titled "Introduction: Feminist engagements with geopolitics" (2011) in the journal Gender, Place & Culture. Her article "The way of the flesh: Life, geopolitics and the weight of the future" (2014) further develops her feminist geopolitical framework.

=== Geohumanities ===
Dixon's work in geohumanities explores the intersections between geography and humanities disciplines, fostering new scholarly interactions and approaches to understanding place, space, and environmental relationships.

=== Environmental research ===
Dixon's environmental research has addressed aesthetic, technological, political, and cultural responses to environmental issues, including toxic landscapes, biodiversity loss, and climate change impacts, in Europe, the United States, sub-Saharan Africa, Australia, and Japan. More recently, her research has focused on geoengineering efforts to address climate change, examining the geopolitics, governance, and aesthetics associated with manipulations of the Earth's climate system.

Her environmental research initiatives include:

- Collaborative dialogues on citizen science, humanitarian technologies, and ethics within state and NGO networks in Malawi.
- Working with geoscientists, engineers, and artists on practical and conceptual aspects of geology in the Anthropocene, particularly in relation to geoenergy and communities in Scotland.
- Collaboration on addressing challenges facing UK coastal communities and ecosystems, developing inclusive policy responses.
- Research on stresses facing peatland communities and ecosystems amid climate change and Net Zero transition efforts.

=== Art-science collaborations ===
Dixon has conducted extensive work on art-science collaborations, examining the conceptual and methodological possibilities afforded by poststructuralist and feminist theories in this context. She has undertaken research projects with colleagues at various institutions, including a residency with SymbioticA, an artistic laboratory at the University of Western Australia, where she studied the aesthetics and politics of bio-art creation.

== Selected publications ==
=== Books ===
- Dixon, D.P. (2016). Feminist Geopolitics: Material States. Routledge. ISBN 9781472480200.
- Jones, M., Jones, R., Woods, M., Whitehead, M., Dixon, D., & Hannah, M. (2014). An Introduction to Political Geography: Space, Place and Politics (2nd ed.). Routledge.
- Smith, K., Fearnley, C.J., Dixon, D., Bird, D.K., & Kelman, I. (2023). Environmental Hazards: Assessing Risk and Reducing Disaster. Routledge.
- Cresswell, T., & Dixon, D. (2002). Engaging Film: Geographies of Mobility and Identity. Rowman & Littlefield.

=== Selected journal articles ===
- Dixon, D.P., & Jones, J.P. (2015). The tactile topologies of Contagion. Transactions of the Institute of British Geographers, 40(2), 223-234.
- Dixon, D.P., Hawkins, H., & Straughan, E.R. (2013). Wonder-full geomorphology: Sublime aesthetics and the place of art. Progress in Physical Geography, 37(2), 227-247.
- Dixon, D.P., Hawkins, H., & Straughan, E.R. (2012). Of human birds and living rocks: Remaking aesthetics for post-human worlds. Dialogues in Human Geography, 2(3), 249-270.
- Dixon, D., & Marston, S.A. (2011). Introduction: Feminist engagements with geopolitics. Gender, Place & Culture, 18(4), 445-453.
- Nicholson, P.J., Dixon, D., Pullanikkatil, D., Moyo, B., Long, H., & Barrett, B. (2019). Malawi stories: mapping an art-science collaborative process. Journal of Maps, 15(3), 39-47.
- Lavery, C., Dixon, D.P., & Hassall, L. (2014). The future of ruins: the baroque melancholy of Hashima. Environment and Planning A, 46(11), 2569-2584.
- Dixon, D.P. (2019). From becoming-geology to geology-becoming: Hashima as geopolitics. In: Bobbette, Adam and Donovan, Amy (eds.) Political Geology: Active Stratigraphies and the Making of Life. Palgrave Macmillan: Cham, pp. 147-165.
