= Aliens Adventure Game =

Tabletop role-playing game

- Cover
- Designers: Barry Nakazono; David McKenzie
- Publishers: Leading Edge Games
- Publication: 1991
- Genres: Role-playing

Aliens Adventure Game is a combat-oriented role-playing game published by Leading Edge Games in 1991.

== Description ==
Aliens Adventure Game, based on the 1986 film Aliens, emphasizes combat between human Colonial Marines and the space horrors from the movie. Like the Living Steel adventure game previously published by Leading Edge Games in 1987, Aliens Adventure Game uses a much simplified version of the complex rules system used in Phoenix Command in 1986.

== Publication history ==
Aliens Adventure Game was designed by Barry Nakazono and David McKenzie, with illustrations and graphic design by Toni Dennis. Leading Edge Games released it in 1991 as a softback 194-page book.

== Gameplay ==
=== Character creation and improvement ===
All characters are newly recruited Colonial Marines. Primary attributes—Strength, Intelligence, Will, Health and Agility—are either generated by dice rolling, or by a point-buy system. Secondary characteristics—Charisma, Leadership, Perception and Motivation—and skills are then generated by dice rolls. Players can also use pre-generated characters.

Once per game year, the character can attempt to increase one Skill with a die roll. Skill levels can also be increased during game play by exceptional successes, at the referee's discretion.

=== Skill resolution ===
When a character wishes to attempt a task, the referee assigns a numerical Difficulty level to the task. The player adds the character's relevant Skill Rating modifier to the Difficulty, and must roll less than or equal to this total on three dice.

=== Combat ===
The Combat system uses percentile dice and tables to resolve combat. Rather than the traditional system of hit points used in many role-playing systems, this game uses detailed hit locations and specific injuries.

== Related product ==
Two years before releasing this game, Leading Edge Games published the Aliens Board Game. The product consisted of a 32-page rule book, a 4-page rules summary, a 17" by 34" map, three card and counter sheets, a ten-sided die and plastic stands for the counters.

== Reception ==
In the February 1992 edition of Challenge (Issue #57), Kevin Barrett was not impressed by this game, stating, "Leading Edge Games took a great universe with cool hardware and messily glued it all to the Phoenix Command rules set. The tech-candy movie we all drooled over through 15 viewings got a role-playing butcher job." Barrett concluded that despite this, the subject overcame the problematic rules: "Despite all I've said, I still like this product – mostly because I liked the movie. If nothing else, the source material is a good read and should give you plenty of ideas for military missions, whether you're running Aliens, MegaTraveller, Twilight: 2000 or Mechwarrior.

In the July 1992 edition of Dragon (Issue 183), Rick Swan thought the combat aspects of the game heavily outweighed the roleplaying. He found the endless dice rolling needed to create a character to be boring, saying, "a monkey might as well be rattling the dice." Swan found the simplified version of the Phoenix Command rules were still convoluted, pointing out that "Complex actions, such as those involving an active opponent or a chance of physical harm, may require Movement modifiers, Risk levels, rolls on the Opponent Skill Rating Generator, and Equipment checks from the Damage to Equipment table." Although he also found the combat system complex, he conceded that the result was much more realistic than the standard hit point system used by many role-playing systems, but "the cost in time and effort is high." He liked the background on the Alien ecology and life cycle, but was disappointed that the game didn't make use of any of that background: "Failure to develop the many promising ideas renders the Aliens as little more than mindless killing machines. Even their attacks are randomly determined." Swan also noted that there were no developed adventures included in the book. He ended without a conclusive recommendation, saying, "The military rules are pretty good, the horror material pretty flat. The detailed combat system allows experienced referees to stage reasonably engaging tactical battles, and the Aliens make formidable opponents. But storytelling is undervalued and underplayed."

In his 1996 book Heroic Worlds: A History and Guide to Role-Playing Games, Lawrence Schick commented that the game is "heavily position-oriented, almost a boardgame", and that the combat rules "are similar to Living Steel, but simpler and smoother, thank goodness".

== Reviews ==
- GamesMaster International (Issue 9 - Apr 1991)
- Casus Belli #66
