= Symbaroum =

Swedish dark fantasy tabletop role-playing game

- Designers: Mattias Johnsson Haake, Mattias Lilja, Martin Grip
- Illustrators: Martin Grip
- Publishers: Järnringen; Free League Publishing
- Publication: 2014
- Genres: Dark fantasy
- Systems: d20 roll-under

Symbaroum is a Swedish dark fantasy tabletop role-playing game created by Mattias Johnsson Haake, Mattias Lilja and Martin Grip. Järnringen first published the game in Sweden in 2014. An English translation was subsequently crowdfunded, followed by an international distribution agreement with Modiphius Entertainment in 2016. Järnringen merged with Free League Publishing in 2018.

The game is set mainly in the kingdom of Ambria and the neighbouring forest of Davokar, which contains the ruins of the fallen civilisation of Symbaroum. Its rules use a twenty-sided die and a roll-under system in which most dice rolls are made by the players.

== Setting and game system ==
Symbaroum focuses on Ambria and the forest of Davokar. The Ambrians settled north of their former homeland following a war, while explorers venture into Davokar in search of the remains and treasures of the ancient civilisation of Symbaroum.

Characters are described by eight attributes. Tests generally succeed when a player rolls equal to or below the relevant attribute on a twenty-sided die, with modifiers applied according to difficulty or opposition. The system is largely player-facing, with players making rolls for attacks and defence rather than the gamemaster.

Magic is associated with Corruption. Characters who use mystical powers can accumulate temporary or permanent Corruption, which can eventually turn a character into an abomination.

== Publication history ==
Järnringen released Symbaroum in Sweden in 2014. An Indiegogo campaign funded an English translation, and Järnringen subsequently partnered with Modiphius Entertainment for international retail distribution.

In October 2018, Järnringen merged with Free League Publishing. The combined company retained the Free League name, and Symbaroum became part of its role-playing game catalogue.

In 2021, Free League crowdfunded Ruins of Symbaroum, an adaptation of the setting using the fifth-edition rules of Dungeons & Dragons.

In 2026, Free League announced a revised edition of the original game. The revision reorganised material from four earlier core books into three volumes: a Core Rulebook, a Gamemaster's Guide and the Davokar Creature Codex.

== Reception ==
Paul Baldowski of Geek Native praised the game's setting and artwork and described its rules as occupying a middle ground between narrative and more traditional role-playing systems. He also criticised parts of the English translation.

Giaco Furino of TechRaptor praised the game's setting and artwork, while criticising the way information about the Corruption rules is distributed through the core rulebook.

The Symbaroum Monster Codex won the 2019 Gold ENnie Award for Best Layout and Design, with Johan Nohr credited for its design, and received the Silver award for Best Art, Interior, with Martin Grip credited as artist. The Ruins of Symbaroum Bestiary won the 2023 Gold ENnie Award for Best Monster/Adversary.
