= Mothership (role-playing game) =

Role-playing game

- 0th Edition cover, art by Sean McCoy
- Designers: Sean McCoy
- Publishers: Tuesday Knight Games
- Publication: 2018 (0e), 2020 (Polish), 2024 (1e)
- Genres: Tabletop role-playing game, horror, science fiction
- Website: https://www.tuesdayknightgames.com/pages/mothership-rpg

Mothership is a science fiction horror tabletop role-playing game with Old School Revival style rules published by indie role-playing game publisher Tuesday Knight Games in 2018.

== Description ==
Mothership is set in the future when humanity has traveled to interstellar space. The horror takes notes of claustrophobia and isolation from the movies Alien (1979) and Event Horizon (1997).

=== Character creation ===
Players first choose which of four classes their character belongs to: Teamster, Scientist, Android, or Marine. Each class has minor bonuses to attributes, a set of skills, and a special ability. The player then rolls six 10-sided dice for each of the character's four attributes: Strength, Speed, Intellect, and Combat. The player likewise rolls the same dice to determine the three Saves: Sanity, Fear, and Body. The character sheet is designed as a flowchart of rolls and decisions that make character creation straightforward for beginners.

The players may also create a spaceship, using complex creation rules, though this step is not necessary for one-shots and planet-based gameplay.

=== Gameplay ===
To determine success or failure of actions, the player must roll a number on percentile dice that is less than the relevant attribute or Resistance. For example, if the character has a strength of 33, and attempts an action that requires strength, the player must roll 32 or less on percentile dice for the action to succeed. Failing an action or a save roll triggers a panic check to determine whether the characters can keep their wits under extreme pressure.

Characters who survive their first session automatically reach second level, and then reach third level after two more sessions. Thereafter, progression slows to the point where a character must survive several dozen sessions to gain a level.

== Publication history ==
Mothership Player's Survival Guide was designed by Sean McCoy, who was inspired by some of the original science fiction role-playing games such as Metamorphosis Alpha. McCoy also provided all the illustrations. McCoy explained that Mothership's journey from "online sensation to a real physical product available on store shelves" was "thanks to a dedicated community, including a Discord server with more than 10,000 fans in it." McCoy's 44-page softcover saddle-stapled book was published by Tuesday Knight Games in 2018. Two years later, a Polish-language edition, Mothership: Przewodnik Przetrwania Gracza, was released in Poland by Tajemnicze RPG.

Further supplements published in zine format, such as Dead Planet (2018), A Pound of Flesh (2019), and Gradient Descent (2020) provide new settings, adventures and further tools for more sophisticated play. Warden's Operations Manual (2024) offers tables to randomize the scenario based on a tool called the T.O.M.B.S cycle (Transgression that awakens the horror, Omens that hints at its arrival, Manifestation where the horror reveals itself to the players, Banishment where the players fight back the horror, Slumber where the horror goes back to slumber for days, years, or eons).

An updated Mothership Sci-Fi Horror RPG 1st Edition Boxed Set was published in 2024 after a seven-figure Kickstarter campaign in 2021, renaming the original publication as the "0th Edition"

== Reception ==
Writing for Black Gate, Patrick Kanouse commented, "Mothership is an easy recommendation. The mechanics are simple but contribute to the feel of the game and also being hackable. Adding additional mechanics for things like cyberware, more weapons, and so on are easy enough (and some exist from those third-parties). Pick up this game. See if you can survive the horrors with your life or sanity. Either way, it'll be wicked fun."

Writing for the Polish site Poltergeist in 2020 about the early editions available at that time, Adam Waskiewicz was less than impressed with the artwork, calling most of the illustrations "sloppy sketches." However, he found the rules to be well written, noting "we get simple and quick mechanics, adapted to play sessions in which characters will easily lose their lives and healthy senses, and survival (not to mention a promotion) will only be for a lucky few." However, Waskiewicz was disappointed by the lack of information about "what the sessions or campaigns in this system should look like." He also found "Another problem that is troubling is the lack of even a rudimentary bestiary." Although he thought that "Mothership does not offer much, and it will be difficult for it to compete with other systems in this genre," he concluded, "it is definitely worth getting acquainted with, especially if someone likes the cosmic horror genre or the [Old School Rules] atmosphere."

Rob Wieland, writing for Forbes, recommended Mothership for "gaming groups that want the thrills and chills of survival horror in space", adding that it "has a lot to say about how the horrors of capitalism force people into experiencing the horrors of deep space."

In his 2023 book Monsters, Aliens, and Holes in the Ground, RPG historian Stu Horvath noted, "The real novelty of the system is Stress and Panic, both of which interrupt the flow of the actions" Horvath concluded "The core rules presented in the Mothership zine provided good bones, and the modules that followed built the house."

== Events ==
In 2024, Tuesday Knight Games organized an event called Mothership Month, which ran from November 12 to December 10. As part of the event, 21 crowdfunding campaigns were launched on the BackerKit platform, focused on adventure modules for the system designed by third-party creators. All campaigns reached their funding goals in the first 10 hours, with the most-backed one being Wages of Sin, an official "hardcover toolkit" for building bounty-hunter campaigns in Mothership. The event also featured the release of an official virtual tabletop for the system and an unofficial game jam on Itch.io. This was the first time BackerKit explored the model of "group crowdfunding".

The success of the event inspired both a sequel in October 2025 theme "The Dream Returns", and Mausritter Month (a similar event focused on the indie RPG Mausritter).

== Awards ==
At the 2019 ENNIE Awards Mothership Player's Survival Guide won Gold in the category "Best Game."

At the 2025 ENNIE Awards Mothership: Deluxe Set won Gold for "Best Production Values", Mothership: Warden's Operations Manual won Gold for "Best Supplement", and Mothership: Companion App Virtual Tabletop won "Best Aid/Accessory - Digital".
