= Grimwild =

Fantasy tabletop role-playing game

- Cover art by Per Janke
- Designers: J.D. Maxwell
- Illustrators: Per Janke
- Publishers: Oddity Press
- Publication: 2024; 2026 (Community Edition)
- Genres: Fantasy
- Systems: Moxie

Grimwild is a fantasy indie tabletop role-playing game, created by J.D. Maxwell and illustrated by Per Janke. The game aims to emulate the fantasy aesthetics and adventuring tropes of Dungeons & Dragons, but uses a narrative ruleset mechanically inspired by Fate, Blades in the Dark, Dungeon World, Cortex Prime, and The Burning Wheel.

The game was originally published by Oddity Press in 2024 after a BackerKit crowdfunding campaign, but its designer J.D. Maxwell went missing in mid-2025. After this disappearance, Grimwild fans published their own Community Edition in 2026.

== Gameplay ==
In Grimwild, when a player character wants to do something risky, a roll is made using a number of six-sided (d6) dice - determined by one of the character's four stats (Brawn, Agility, Wits, or Presence), special abilities, and other factors - and taking the single highest result; a 6 is a 'perfect' outcome, 4 or 5 is a 'messy' outcome, and 1-3 is a 'grim' outcome. A number of eight-sided dice called 'thorns' can also be added to the roll by the GM to represent difficulty or complication, which reduce the action's result by one step (from a perfect to a messy, or from a grim to a disaster) on rolls of 7 or 8.

Diminishing pools of d6s are used to track impending events, dwindling resources, or challenges to be overcome. They are rolled whenever they are triggered (from a specific mechanic or in the fiction, often after a successful character action roll), and the dice that come up as 3 or lower are removed from the pool, with a change in the fiction once all dice are removed this way.

Player characters in Grimwild have access to two special resources - spark allows players to add an extra die to an action roll (which is regained after narrative events such as rolling a disaster or resolving a story arc), while story (which is limited to two uses per session per player) allows characters to declare certain story details in the game (the scope of which is restricted to thematically fit the character).

Magic in Grimwild is free-form rather than based on specific prewritten spells, being based on a combination of 'touchstones' (broad descriptors of the magic being cast) and one of four possible magnitudes (from the simplest and least impactful cantrips, through regular spells that require an action roll, to powerful rituals that require specific setup), with the ability to cast magic being dependent on a character's talents or arcana (magic items).

Before making their characters, players decide on the nature and themes of their campaign setting and adventuring party, including an initial story arc for the group to follow and a few descriptors of their party (both in terms of what they are, and what they are not). Character creation involves choosing one of twelve adventuring paths (which mirror the character classes of Dungeons & Dragons in name and theme, particularly those in 5th edition, such as the bard, monk, and sorcerer), and a number of narrative components of the character (including their pre-adventuring backgrounds or ancestry, distinctive traits, bonds with other characters, personality traits, and personal character arcs). Each path grants a powerful core talent unique to that path (which improves as the character gains levels), and players choose and gain additional talents either from their own path or another, being encouraged to 're-skin' them to suit their character concept (such as re-imagining the fighter's protective Bulwark talent as a wizard's magical shield).

The gamemaster (GM) in Grimwild has a number of moves they can use to manage the pacing of the game (similar to moves seen in Powered by the Apocalypse games), broken up into three categories of story moves, suspense moves (which grant the GM a resource named suspense), and impact moves (which inflict mechanical and narrative consequences on player characters, at the expense of the GM's suspense). They can also make story rolls to disclaim decision-making, and use diminishing pools, suspense, and custom moves to construct and run complex challenges (such as negotiating peace between multiple factions, or fighting a large monster with distinct body parts or combat phases).

== Development ==
Designer J.D. Maxwell began on working on the system behind Grimwild, Moxie, in mid-2023, after playing Blades in the Dark and bringing in design ideas from other tabletop games such as Fate and The Burning Wheel, first with an unreleased sci-fi zine, then through another game called The Wild Frontier of Venture (planned as part of a larger series of interconnected games). Not satisfied with the design of the latter, he put off working on it, creating Grimwild as "something of a stress test to see how versatile [Moxie] was."

== Publication history ==
A crowdfunding campaign for Grimwild and two adventure modules, Gaelenvale and Nevermore, was run on BackerKit in mid-2024, which became available digitally in late 2024 and early 2025. The Grimwild rulebook was made available in both free and paid editions, the latter containing an extra chapter of optional rules and advice, with the text of the game released under a Creative Commons license.

In mid-2025, Oddity Press ran another BackerKit campaign for an expanded print run of the game. As of January 2026, there has been no contact with the game's author J.D. Maxwell since shortly after the campaign, and the project is considered abandoned by BackerKit.

=== Community Edition ===
In 2026, following J.D. Maxwell's disappearance, Grimwild's online fans worked together in to develop a new version of the game called the Community Edition, featuring changes, clarifications, and additions to the rules based on feedback for the original game. Among these were more detailed descriptions of game mechanics that were previously considered too terse, "Reader Lens" segments which draw comparisons to other RPGs players may be familiar with, tweaks to the game's harm rules to make them less punishing, as well as both new character paths and overhauls to the original ones.

The Community Edition was made available for free digitally, and as a print-on-demand hardcover book.

== Related works ==
=== The Wild Frontier of Venture ===
Another Moxie-based role-playing game from Oddity Press, The Wild Frontier of Venture is a weird western game set on the titular planet of Venture. Oddity Press ran a BackerKit campaign to fund the game's development in March 2025, and a free preview version of the rules was made available. Similar to Grimwild, the project is considered abandoned by BackerKit as of January 2026 due to the unreachability of the author J.D. Maxwell.

== Reception ==
The free edition of Grimwild was a gold winner of the 2025 ENNIE Award for Best Free Product, while Nevermore was nominated in the Best Adventure (Short Form) category.

Dave Thaumavore called Grimwild the "ultimate form of story-first Dungeons & Dragons", calling it "the D&D people new to D&D wish they were playing after watching the highly-abstracted experience on Critical Role and Stranger Things", praising the game's rules but noting that it's "surprisingly brutal," and criticizing the swingy nature of the diminishing pools mechanic, large amount of new and unique rules terminology that may be overwhelming to new players, and that the book does not explain some of its concepts in enough detail.

Writing for Cannibal Halfling Gaming, Aaron Marks compared Grimwild to Dungeon World, but said that "it's not the next Dungeon World. It's not an indie version of D&D, it's a version of D&D that's delivering on the playstyle and the tropes of D&D in a distilled and easy to grasp package. The really indie stuff in Grimwild, like player-facing dungeon design, is probably going to turn some people off. That said, it's easier to exclude or houserule than virtually any of D&D's worst sins, and certain groups will end up discovering they like it."
