= Forbidden Lands =

Role-playing game

Forbidden Lands is a fantasy role-playing game published by Free League Publishing (Fria Ligan in Swedish) in 2018. It takes place in a medieval fantasy post-apocalyptic setting, where the destruction has limited itself to one kingdom. A fatal mist, which had killed any person venturing outside at night, has cleared. Adventurers may now explore the uninhabited castles and cities left behind.

== Gameplay ==
Player characters have four main attributes: Strength, Agility, Wits and Empathy. Unlike most other role-playing games, Forbidden Lands does not use a "hit point" mechanic to measure combat damage; instead, physical damage directly reduces Strength, while psychic damage reduces Wits. PCs can earn Willpower which is used to trigger certain Talents. In order to generate Willpower, players must re-roll failed checks, at the risk of taking further damage to their attributes or to their gear. A result of 1 otherwise known as a 'bane' will cause a temporary reduction to the relevant stat or gear involved. Each 'bane' will generate one point of Willpower

== Reception ==
Writing for Tabletop Gaming, Richard Jansen-Parkes called the game "a delightfully old-school take on the traditional fantasy RPG, creating a sense of freedom that rewards GMs for a hands-off approach and allows the players to truly forge their own destiny." He noted that although the game sought to give an "old school" feel, "the mechanics that propel the game along are thoroughly modern and supported by a few rather fascinating innovations." The single frustration Jansen-Parkes found was that "the towns and villages seem plucked straight from a conventional dark fantasy world rather than one where settlements were forced to survive in near-isolation for hundreds of years. These may seem petty concerns, but the blood mist is such a fascinating idea that it’s frustrating when it fails to gel with the details." Despite this, he concluded "This doesn’t change the fact that Forbidden Land is a beautiful game that offers a chance for players to experience something that captures the feel of old-school adventuring but still feels fresh. It’s well worth a look for anyone looking for something different to their fantasy gaming."

John O'Neill reviewed Forbidden Lands for Black Gate, and stated that "Last thing I need is another fantasy RPG crowding my shelves, especially one in a generic fantasy setting. But the evocative text sold me on the promise of a dark world far-removed from routine high fantasy tropes, and characters that sounded a lot closer to sword & sorcery archetypes than I'm used to."

== Awards ==
- At the 2019 ENnie Awards,
  - Winner of Gold in two categories: "Best Cartography" and "Best Production Values"
  - Winner of Silver in two categories: "Best Rules" and "Product of the Year".
- At the 2019 Origins Awards, finalist in the category "Best Roleplaying Game"

== Supplementary materials ==
Free League has released a number of campaigns, sourcebooks, and shorter scenarios for the Forbidden Lands setting:

- Raven's Purge
- The Bitter Reach
- The Bloodmarch
- The Crypt of the Mellified Mage
- The Spire of Quetzel
- Book of Beasts

The game was distributed in the United States by Modiphius Entertainment.
