= Mausritter =

2020 tabletop role-playing game

- Designers: Isaac Williams, Andre Novoa
- Publishers: Games Omnivorous
- Publication: 2020
- Genres: Tabletop role-playing game, fantasy

Mausritter is a fantasy tabletop role-playing game by Isaac Williams, with development by Andre Novoa. The game was inspired by the Old School Renaissance, and uses a system based on the game Into the Odd. Players in Mausritter take on the roles of anthropomorphic mice (similar to media such as Mouse Guard, Redwall or Mice and Mystics), going on adventures and exploring dungeons in a large and dangerous world in search of treasure.

== Gameplay ==
Mausritter player characters have three core stats (determined randomly during character creation), and each character's inventory is represented through a grid of squares, where items such as armor, weapons, tools, and spell tablets can be equipped by placing physical cards into corresponding slots. Size and orientation of these cards matters as well - for example, light armor takes up an off-hand (or off-paw) slot and a body slot in a horizontal orientation simultaneously, while heavy armor takes up two body slots in a vertical orientation. Items and spells have limited uses marked with dots on their cards until they are depleted. Characters can also suffer from negative conditions such as hunger, exhaustion, wounds, and magical curses, which also take up inventory slots until they are cleared by meeting specific criteria.

Magic spells come in the form of tablets, and whenever a spell is cast, multiple of its uses can be spent at once to increase its power. Once depleted, unique conditions must be met for the spell table to recharge and become usable again - for example, the Fireball spell must be burned in a large fire for a long time.

== Publication history ==
The prototype for Mausritter was published as a digital zine in 2019. The expanded, physical edition was released in 2020. In 2021, a Kickstarter campaign raised AU $149,041 to release a new starter box set, including ten interconnected adventures and updated art.

== Related works ==
In 2024, the Mausritter player community combined game jam entries for dungeon crawl settings from over forty designers into a single, massive dungeon called Tomb of a Thousand Doors: A Mausritter Megadungeon. The book raised $94,305 on Kickstarter. The megadungeon was then nominated for ENNIE awards in 2026 in the "Best Long-Form Adventure" and "Best Cartography" categories.

In November 2025, the crowdfunding platform BackerKit held a month-long event called Mausritter Month, inspired by the similar ongoing campaign for the Mothership role-playing game, where sixteen publishers all launched crowdfunding campaigns for Mausritter supplements simultaneously, raised over $320,000 in total across all projects.

== Reception ==
Mausritter won the 2021 Gold ENNIE Award for "Best Family Game/Product."
