= Electric Bastionland =

Role-playing game

- Cover art by Alec Sorensen
- Designers: Chris McDowall
- Illustrators: Alec Sorensen
- Publishers: Bastionland Press
- Publication: 2020

Electric Bastionland, subtitled "Deeper into the Odd", is a steampunk-flavored, OSR tabletop role-playing game in which characters become treasure hunters in a very strange city in order to pay back a large debt. It was designed by Chris McDowall, illustrated by Alec Sorensen, and released by the indie publisher Bastionland Press in 2020.

== Description ==
Electric Bastionland is a game of the Old School Renaissance movement, which seeks to emulate the minimal rules and imaginative play style of the earliest role-playing games of the 1970s. In an interview, designer Chris McDowall stated, "My focus is on trying to create games that have light rules, fast gameplay and lots of flavour to get the table inspired."

=== Setting ===
The characters are part of a group that somehow has become encumbered by an onerous debt of £10,000. (Whoever is the youngest player at the table randomly determines the reason for the group's debt.) The only way to pay it back is for everyone to leave their previous occupations and become treasure hunters. The game is set in Bastion, a city that has what critic Pauly Beakley called "a 1920s aesthetic". Bastion is ever-changing because the gamemaster — called the Conductor — randomly generates details for the city as an adventure progresses. That information is overwritten by new randomly generated details and the old information rapidly becomes irrelevant.

=== Character generation ===
Character generation is very quick: a player rolls three six-sided dice three times. The rolls become their character's ability scores for Strength, Dexterity and Charisma. The highest and lowest rolls also define the character's previous occupation — the majority of the 300-page book is taken up with descriptions of over one hundred "Failed Careers". Each description includes random tables to determine why the character left and what equipment, skills or mutations belong to the character as a result. Samples of Failed Careers include Avant Guardsman, Bartender, Lone Stargazer, Cryptohistorian, Corpse Collector, Pie Smuggler, Amateur Amputator, Tuk-tuk Driver, Street Urchin, Professional Gambler, Actupressurist of Inanimate Objects, Constable of Birds & Creeping Things, and Good Dog. There is no mechanism for character advancement or increases in abilities due to experience — the assumption is that the game will be relatively short and end when the group's debt is paid off.

=== Gameplay ===
As critic Richard Jansen-Parkes noted, the Conductor is urged "to avoid avenues of play that might end up preserving the status quo, and instead offer paths that shake up the situation."

The rules only cover two pages, using a system called Mark of the Odd, taken from the previously published role-playing game Into the Odd. For rare saving throws, the player rolls a 20-sided die and tries to get less than a target number. For combat, since every attack is assumed to hit, there are no attack rolls, only damage rolls. Characters can wear equipment that soaks up a certain number of hit points of damage; once that is gone, subsequent damage begins to reduce Strength. If Strength is reduced to zero, the character is dead. However, this usually takes longer than anticipated because of all the attacks aimed at the target in a round, only the highest die roll is scored.

Example: A party of four goblins attacks a character with 7 Strength points left, rolling damage on a six-sided die of 1, 2, 3, and 5. Only the 5 counts, leaving the character with 2 Strength points.

== Publication history ==
In 2015, the British game designer Chris McDowall created the survival horror game Into the Odd, using a very stripped down set of rules. Several years later, McDowall created the steampunk-flavoured Electric Bastionland using the same rule system, which was published by indie publisher Bastionland Press in 2020 with artwork by Alec Sorensen. This was followed by several supplements, including The Clay Shelf (2020), Electric Wizards (2020), The Positronic Library (2020), and Trash Planet Epsilon 5 (2021).

Electric Bastionland also caught the eye of the European gaming community. The fourth issue of the Swedish RPG magazine KOMMyHA featured an adventure for the game, "Valvaka" ("Election Watch").

== Reception ==
Richard Jansen-Parkes, writing for Tabletop Gaming, called this "a mesmerising slab of game design that somehow feels crisply modern and punkishly old-school at the very same time." Jansen-Parkes liked the immediacy of the game, noting, "There's no time to hesitate and no way to avoid consequences. The game pushes you forward at every moment, handing out choices that always end up achieving something." Jansen-Parkes was also drawn to the strangeness of the ever-changing city, remarking, "there's something so unsettling about the ever-shifting world of Electric Bastionland that allows it to work. The strangeness is less that of a brightly coloured drug trip, and more the creeping confusion that comes of visiting a foreign supermarket." Jansen-Parkes concluded, "The result is a game that demands to be played. Maybe you'll pay off your debt, maybe you'll be blended into soup by an arcane turbine somewhere beneath the city. Either way, it'll be an experience worth having."

Writing for The Indie Game Reading Club, Paul Beakley commented on the mutability of the city setting, saying, "A Bastion in a game with a Science Mystic, Masked Horrorist, Tuk-Tuk Driver, and Traveling Show-Person is going to look much different than a game with a Disinherited Socialite, Lone Stargazer, an Underground Weirdo ... and a Canal Nomad." But Beakley felt that the minimalist approach was too minimalist, even for an OSR game, and questioned whether an inexperienced player could grasp the deliberate oddness of this game with so little structure provided by the rules. Beakley also questioned some of the rhetoric in the book about good game play, and asked if the structure of the game helped to achieve those goals. "'Make the players feel welcome, break the barriers that stop you from having fun at the table, your table should be warm and inviting.' All worthy goals, for sure, but nothing about the game itself gets me there."

In his 2023 book Monsters, Aliens, and Holes in the Ground, RPG historian Stu Horvath called this "a game devoted to aggressive minimalism. I've often wondered how little system a game can have while still functioning like a traditional RPG, and I might have my answer here." Horvath noted that this minimalism and the inherent randomness of the city setting "summon a new Bastion into existence during every session, one defined by chance and fancy. As the book says, 'This is a world discovered at the table, not inside a book.'"

== Awards ==
- At the 2020 ENnie Awards, Electric Bastionland was a finalist in the category "Best Writing".

== Related works ==
=== Mythic Bastionland ===
In 2025, Chris McDowall published Mythic Bastionland, a prequel to Electric Bastionland, set in an Arthurian fantasy past of the setting.

=== Intergalactic Bastionland ===
In 2026, Chris McDowall released a playtest for Intergalactic Bastionland, a science-fiction sequel to the Bastionland games, subtitled "Beyond Into the Odd".
