= Phoenix Command =

1986 military role-playing game

- Designers: Barry Nakazono, David McKenzie
- Publishers: Leading Edge Games
- Publication: 1986
- Genres: Military
- Systems: Phoenix Command

Phoenix Command is a combat-oriented role-playing game system published by Leading Edge Games in 1986. Variations of its rules system have also been used in other military games such as Morning Star Missions, Living Steel, and Aliens Adventure Game.

== Description ==
The boxed set contains two books: a spiral-bound rule book for character creation and combat; and a lengthy supplement on modern small arms.

Although Phoenix Command is ostensibly a role-playing game, and does have character generation and skills resolution systems, the extremely detailed rules for small arms combat are the central focus of the game. The game utilizes lookup tables which resolve injuries to specific digits, organs, and bones, and simulates the physics of different attacks, such as bullets with different velocities.

The rulebook is divided into five chapters:

1. "The Character": Character creation has been characterized as simple, with only 4 attributes created by rolling three dice. The rules suggest that skills could be on a 1 to 20 scale, but that the skills system used should be open to the gamemaster and players to agree on.
2. "Movement and Combat": Guide du Rôliste Galactique calls this the heart of the system. Combat is dependent on movement tactical displays, and a large number of statistics that are subject to adjustment based on conditional factors. Critic Dave Nalle called the combat system slow but realistic.
3. "Medical Aid and Recovery": A well-detailed and realistic overview of injuries suffered during modern combat, treatments and recovery times.
4. "Game Tips and Playing Aids: Gameplay advice. Two short scenarios are included to provide insight into game mechanics.
5. "Optional Rules": A multitude of rules to cover many situations. This includes rules for reconnaissance, shotguns, explosions, initiative, morale, and automatic fire. Dave Nalle commented, "I would certainly use or ignore [these] depending on how much I wanted to get bogged down in play."

The second book, "Modern Military Small Arms", contains detailed descriptions of 151 weapons, with game statistics for each.

== Publication history ==
Phoenix Command was designed by Barry Nakazono and David McKenzie, and was published by Leading Edge Games in 1986 as a boxed set containing a 56-page spiral bound rule book, 32 page modern military weapon data supplement, reference tables, blank character sheets and one ten-sided die.

Additional supplements were subsequently published, including Hand to Hand Combat System (1988), World War 2 Weapon Data Supplement (1988), Wild West Weapon Data Supplement (1989), Civilian Weapon Data Supplement (1987), Living Steel Power Armour Sourcebook (1991), Advanced Damage Tables (1987), High Tech Weapon Data Supplement (1987), Phoenix Command Advanced Rules for Small Arms Combat (1986), Phoenix Command Damage Tables: Small Arms (1986), Phoenix Command Small Arms Combat System (1989), and Phoenix Command Special Weapons Weapon Data Supplement (1989).

== Reception ==
In Issue 39 of Abyss, Dave Nalle called this "about as realistic a modern combat system as I have seen. Every aspect of combat and related activity is covered in detail, and the mechanics are detailed and completely convincing." Nalle noted that the combat system could be inserted into a campaign of Twilight: 2000 or Recon. However, Nalle questioned the game's complexity, writing, "The question that plagues me is whether or not all this detail is really necessary." Nalle concluded that although the game was well-developed, realistic and packaged nicely, "I can only recommend it for those who place accuracy above adventure and realism above role-playing, for its pursuit of realism goes beyond the limits of practicality and its level of detail could overwhelm more subtle aspects of a campaign."

In Issue 47 of Different Worlds, Roman Andron was impressed, saying, "Never before have such high degrees of realism and playability been achieved simultaneously in the gaming world. Compared to this, all other combat systems are nothing." Despite the complexity of the combat system, Andron insisted, "The combat system is easy to use." Andron also liked the deadliness of the combat system since "combatants are incapacitated or killed quickly once hit, and do not clutter up play." Andron did think that the game should have used the metric system, and also found the use of too many acronyms slowed down the learning process. Despite this, Andron gave a positive recommendation, saying, "| heartily recommend this system to weapons buffs or anyone wanting to put realism into their role-playing or wargaming. Phoenix Command provides for a simple yet highly-realistic simulation of modern firearms combat. However, my recommendations cannot do justice to the system. It has to be used to be fully appreciated."

Writing for Gizmodo, Ed Grabianowski found the complexity took away from the enjoyment of the game, saying, "This game of modern combat closely resembles what Actuary: The RPG would look like. Its goal is insanely detailed accuracy, with table after table describing the statistical values of weapons and ammunition and what happens when said ammunition hits a human body."

In his 1990 book The Complete Guide to Role-Playing Games, game critic Rick Swan called this "Less of an RPG than a meticulous combat system" and noted that it was made for "role-players who relish every smack and slash of a combat encounter." Although Swan found the combat system quite complex, he noted that it "plays quite well and produces astonishingly realistic results." Swan found the role-playing rules "merely adequate" and the scenarios "fairly routine", and suggested the game would be more useful as a supplement and reference to other military role-playing games such as Top Secret/S.I. or Twilight 2000. He concluded by giving the game a solid rating of 3 out of 4, saying, "as a combat system, Phoenix Command is top of the line, rivaling the best tactical wargames in detail and sophistication."

In his 2023 book Monsters, Aliens, and Holes in the Ground, writer Stu Horvath found the combat system very complex, noting, "It is dismaying in its detail, chronicling the many possible ways to shoot guns (and be shot by them) with excruciating precision... While the proliferation of military RPGs in the '80s is evidence that there are players who find this sort of chart consultation exhilarating, it beggars belief that these sorts of systems saw regular play without significant simplification through house rules.""
