= Mörk Borg =

Heavy metal tabletop role-playing game

- Cover art by Johan Nohr
- Designers: Pelle Nilsson, Johan Nohr
- Publishers: Free League Publishing
- Publication: 2020
- Genres: tabletop role-playing game, heavy metal music
- Chance: High
- Age range: 16+
- Skills: Role-playing, imagination

Mörk Borg (Swedish: literally Dark Castle, officially translated Dark Fort), stylised MÖRK BORG, is an apocalyptic fantasy role-playing game by Pelle Nilsson and Johan Nohr published by Fria Ligan in 2020 that features dark themes inspired by heavy metal music, frequent character death and a doom metal playlist. Its popularity resulted in a large number of expansions, supplements and adventures created by the fan community.

== Overview ==
Mörk Borg is a fantasy role-playing game (RPG) in an apocalyptic setting. It is set in the continent of Tveland, where the upcoming fulfillment of seven prophecies will bring the world to an end. RPG historian Stu Horvath described the central theme of the game as "what player characters do in the last days —— speed them up, work to stop them, or just try to get rich and enjoy themselves before the lights go out." The end of days is so close that players do not have to bother to name their characters. To add to the general darkness of the game, the world is one of corruption, horror and nihilism. Critic Sara Elsam noted, the game involves "valleys riddled with undead, gothic cathedrals and a cursed forest ... cannibal warlocks, poison peddlers from beyond the void and hungry gut worms." Once the world and the game both end, players are encouraged to burn the book. One adventure is included in the book, "Rotblack Sludge", in which the characters venture through the palace of a creature called the Shadow King.

=== Graphic design ===
Johan Noh's graphic design was intended on purpose to be dense and hard to read. Stu Horvath commented that "the difficulty of navigating the ornate typesetting. Every spread is visually rich with chaotic font choices and gnarly splatter art ... There are also foil mirrors and different types of paper. It's a physically intense book, beautifully ugly."

=== Gameplay ===
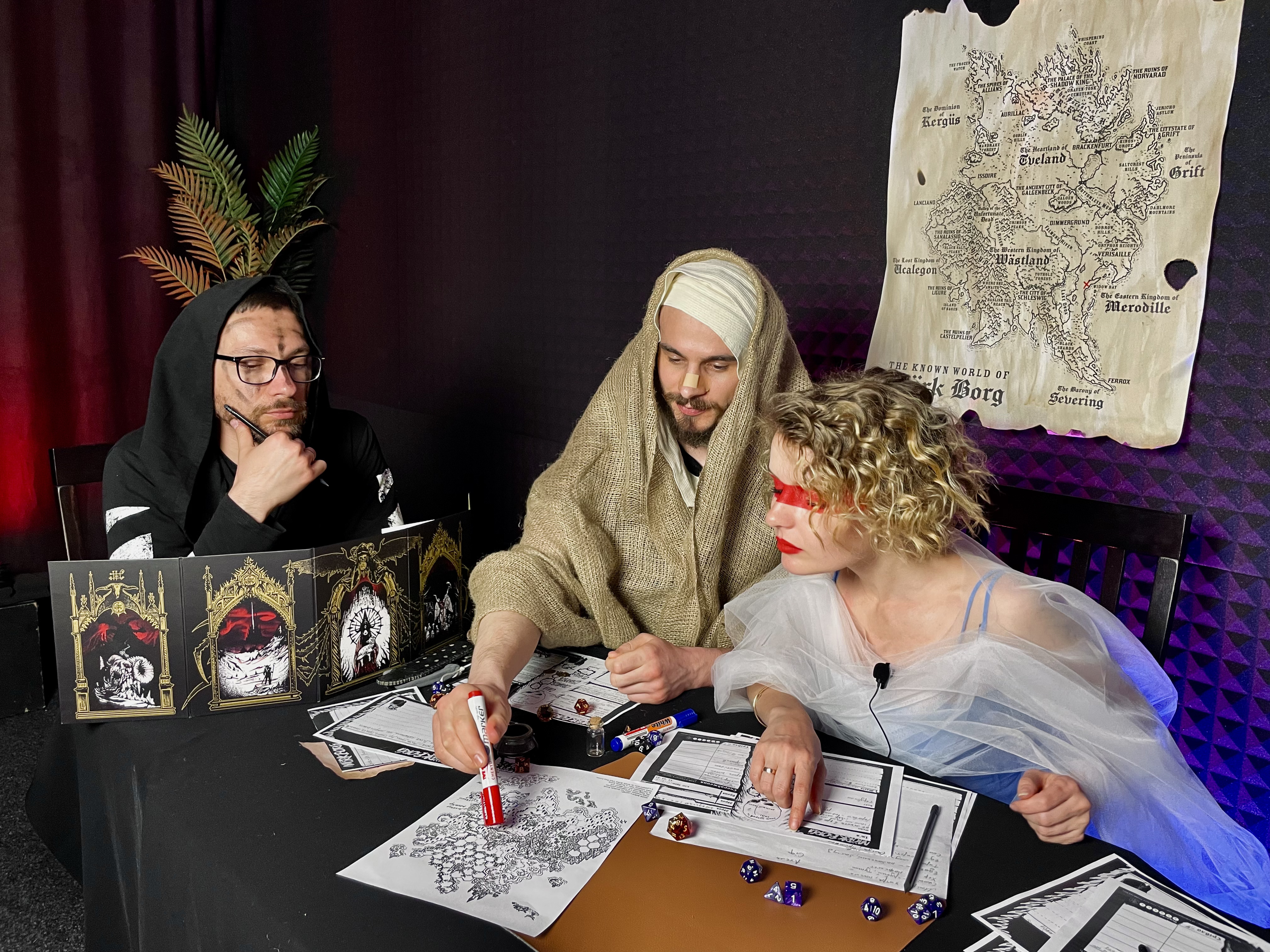
Ukrainian actual play team "Myth Hunters" during a Mörk Borg session

As part of the Old School Renaissance, the game uses a rules-light system in which characters are randomly generated. There are six character types such as Gutterborn Scum or Esoteric Hermit, who can possess one of 20 occult powers. Action is resolved by rolling a 20-sided die and adding the relevant character stat modifier.

=== Metal playlist ===
The game comes with a recommended playlist of more than seven hours of doom metal and death metal. The list includes "The Screen" by YOB, "Hawk as Weapon" by Conan, and Amongst the Catacombs of Nephren-Ka by Nile.

== Publication history ==
In 2018, Swedish writer Pelle Nilsson designed a dark RPG while waiting in queue for eight hours to have a load of apples juiced. Working with artist Johan Nohr, Nilsson conceived of a small zine that would explain the rules and lore. However, a Kickstarter campaign crowdsourced enough funds to print a full-sized 92-page hardcover rulebook, published by Fria Ligan in 2020 with cover and interior art by Nohr. An English translation was also published in 2019 by Free League Workshop, the English-language arm of Fria Ligan.

The game proved to be very popular, and many adventures and supplements have been created by the fan community.

== Reception ==
Writing for Dicebreaker, Sara Elsam called it "A pitch-black apocalyptic fantasy RPG." Elsam noted that using the occult powers was a double-edged sword, for "while they let you bend reality, they will also have terrible consequences when they inevitably fail."

In a later column on Dicebreaker, Alex Meehan named Mörk Borg one of the best tabletop role-playing games of 2024, saying, "An apocalyptic RPG, Mörk Borg isn't about being a hero - it's about finding something worthwhile to cling onto as the last vestiges of humanity turn to ashes." Meehan commented on the game's darkness, saying, "All of this ... makes for a pretty mean RPG that we wouldn’t recommend to new roleplayers or anyone who isn’t up for having a depressing time." Meehan concluded, "The end might be very dark in Mörk Borg, but there are plenty of opportunities to create light before it all goes dark - which is why curious players should check it out."

Pearse Anderson, writing for The Guardian, called it a "headbanger of a game that is the latest example of the fertile cross-pollination between tabletop role-playing and extreme metal: a love letter to the hellraising imagery, lyrics, and album art of metal."

In his 2023 book Monsters, Aliens, and Holes in the Ground, RPG historian Stu Horvath noted that although the game has a grim setting, "This is not to say that the game is a joyless affair. The book itself, as an object, is sublime." Horvath also noted the game's underlying subversive humor, commenting, "[The humor] is very specific, draped in the trappings of death, black and doom metal, but it's there, pushing those trappings to ridiculous extremes and struggling to maintain a straight face under the corpse paint." Horvath concluded, "Honestly, if you can't laugh at the end of the world, what can you laugh at?"

== Awards ==
- 2020 ENnie Awards:
  - Gold: "Product of the Year," "Best Writing," and "Best Layout and Design"
  - Silver: "Best Game."
- 2021 ENnie Awards:
  - Gold: Mörk Borg Cult: Feretory for "Best Supplement."
- 2022 ENnie Awards:
  - Gold: Mörk Borg Digital Monster Generator for "Best Aid/Accessory - Digital."
  - Gold: The Mörk Borg online tool DNGNGEN for "Best Online Content"
  - Silver: The Mörk Borg online tool DNGNGEN for "Best Aid/Accessory - Digital."
