= Triangle Agency =

Satirical horror tabletop role-playing game

- Designers: Caleb Zane Huett and Sean Ireland
- Publishers: Haunted Table Games
- Publication: 2024
- Genres: Tabletop role-playing game, horror

Triangle Agency is a satirical horror tabletop role-playing game about employees at a secretive and oppressive corporation. It has a metatextual instruction book written in the style of a company handbook. Triangle Agency was designed by Caleb Zane Huett and Sean Ireland. Haunted Table Games published it in 2024 after raising $379,602 on Kickstarter. Triangle Agency was inspired by the video game Control, the book House of Leaves, the movie The Matrix, and the TV show The X-Files.

== Gameplay ==
Triangle Agency is designed for campaigns of 10–15 sessions. The player characters are Resonants, people who have bonded with supernatural entities called Anomalies. To create characters, players select strange abilities granted by their Anomalies, as well as their jobs at the corporation and interpersonal relationships that allow players to introduce NPCs. The session structure is based on procedural dramas.

The goal of each session is to deal with uncontained Anomalies (by capturing or destroying them), or to eliminate existing evidence of Anomalies. The dice system uses a pool of 6 four-sided dice; the roll is a success if the pool contains at least one 3. Failures give the gamemaster chaos points for adding complications.

== Literary style ==
The designers call the game's genre "corporate horror." The book uses a metatextual literary style in which the fictional corporation refers to the game itself as the company's creation. The instruction book has multiple unreliable narrators. According to the book, the players are actually employees at the corporation and hallucinating their real lives. These elements were influenced by House of Leaves and The Matrix.

== Reception ==
Rowan Zeoli for Polygon called Triangle Agency "the best game I've ever read" writing:

The punchline-per-page ratio is astronomical. Woven into every paragraph is some comedic dissection of the ways corporations ask their employees to sacrifice their lives for the good of the company. [...] At every opportunity the physical text of Triangle Agency works to evoke the absurd horror of working under late-stage capitalism, while never letting its lofty concept run away with its playability.

Aaron Boehm for Bloody Disgusting praised the GM materials and game mechanics, writing:

From top to bottom, Triangle Agency is a special game. It gives you the tools to build compelling and multilayered characters while encouraging creative problem solving over direct confrontation, and all within one of the most thematically consistent and compelling rulebooks I’ve seen in quite some time.

Samantha Nelson for Polygon named Triangle Agency as one of the best new tabletop RPG books of 2024, calling it "One of the funniest TTRPG rulebooks out there" and writing that "The focus on how will affects reality also makes it one of the better manifestations of collaborative storytelling."
