= Free League Publishing =

Swedish game studio and publisher

- Industry: Role-playing game and book publishing
- Founded: 2011
- Headquarters: Stockholm, Sweden
- Number of employees: 20
- Website: freeleaguepublishing.com

Free League Publishing is a game studio and publisher based in Stockholm, Sweden, formed in 2011. The company designs and publishes tabletop role-playing games, board games, and books based on licensed properties and independent works. Their games include Dragonbane, Alien: The Roleplaying Game, Vaesen, Forbidden Lands, Invincible--Superhero Roleplaying, and Mörk Borg.

== History ==
After the Swedish publisher Järnringen closed in 2011, founder Järnringen got in touch with some role-playing game enthusiasts to ask if they wanted to take over development of the role-playing game Svavelvinter, which led to the formation of Free League Publishing.

The publisher has had a series of successful crowdfunding campaigns. Between 2015 and 2022, their Kickstarter campaigns managed to gather 100 million SEK (10 million USD) in total funding.

== Major releases ==
=== Games ===
- Alien: The Roleplaying Game (Gold ENNIE for Best Game 2020)
- Blade Runner: The Roleplaying Game based on the film and its spinoffs. (It won Gold ENNIE for Best Cartography and Organization & Design 2023)
- Invincible - Superhero Roleplaying based on the TV series Invincible. Free League raised over $400,000 for the game in an October 2025 Kickstarter campaign.
- The One Ring Roleplaying Game second edition, (Gold ENNIE for Best Art, Interior 2022) set in J. R. R. Tolkien's Middle-earth setting. It was created by War of the Ring designer Francesco Nepitello and The Lord of the Rings Roleplaying, the game's 5th Edition OGL sister line.
- Twilight: 2000, a sandbox post-apocalyptic survival game set in an alternate history in which the Soviet Union never collapsed and the Cold War between the two superpowers went hot.
- Vaesen, a Nordic horror roleplaying game based on the works by Johan Egerkrans (Gold ENNIE for Best Art, Interior 2021) and its supplement Mythic Britain & Ireland (Gold ENNIE for Best Art, Interior and Best Setting 2023).
- Mörk Borg, a stylized grimdark fantasy RPG (Silver ENNIE for Best Game 2020.)
- Tales from the Loop, a TTRPG set in an alternative 1980s and based on the work of visual artist Simon Stålenhag. A sequel, Things from the Flood, takes place in the 1990s.
- The Electric State, a TTRPG set in an alternative California of the 1990s and also based on the work of visual artist Simon Stålenhag.
- Forbidden Lands, a sandbox fantasy survival RPG (winner of four ENNIE Awards 2019)
- Mutant: Year Zero, a post-apocalyptic RPG. (Silver ENNIE for Best Rules 2015)
- Coriolis – The Third Horizon, a space-set RPG. (ENNIE Judge's Spotlight Award 2017.)
- Symbaroum, a gritty fantasy RPG.
- Drakar och Demoner, an RPG released in updated form as Dragonbane in English.
- The Walking Dead Universe Roleplaying Game, based on AMC's The Walking Dead television series.
- Crusader Kings, a board game based on the Crusader Kings grand strategy video game.
- Coriolis: The Great Dark Core Rulebook role-playing game published in 2025

=== Other awards ===
In addition to winning ENNIE Awards for multiple games, Free League Publishing won the Publisher of the Year award in 2020, 2021, 2023, and 2024.

=== Other publications ===
Free League has published the art books Tales from the Loop, Things from the Flood, and The Electric State by Simon Stålenhag, as well as the illustrated edition of the Lovecraft story "The Call of Cthulhu" by French artist François Baranger.
