= Leading Edge Games =

American game company

Leading Edge Games was an American game company that produced role-playing games and game supplements.

== History ==
Leading Edge Games published Sword's Path: Glory Book 1 in 1982, followed in 1982 by Sword's Path Glory Book 2. The Sword's Path system was never completed, lacking a promised magic system. The authors told fans to use the magic system from a later product, Rhand: Morningstar Missions, which was published in 1984.

Leading Edge Games published Phoenix Command in 1986, Living Steel, and Dragonstar Rising in 1987.

Aliens Board Game was published in 1989 and the Aliens Adventure Game was published by Leading Edge Games in 1991. In 1993, Leading Edge published the Bram Stoker's DRACULA Roleplaying Game, based on the Francis Ford Coppola film released by Columbia Pictures.
