= Living Steel =

Science fiction role-playing game

- Cover art by Steve Huston
- Designers: Barry Nakazono
- Illustrators: Jon Conrad; Toni Dennis; Steve Huston; Scott Miller; Maggie Parr
- Publishers: Leading Edge Games
- Publication: 1987
- Genres: Science fiction
- Systems: Phoenix Command

Living Steel is a high-tech science fiction role-playing game published by Leading Edge Games in 1987.

== Setting ==
In 2349, the human-colonized planet Rhand is ruled by an autocratic government that seeks to crush a rebellion known as Alpha Team. However, the planet has just suffered a devastating attack by an alien race called the Spectrals. In addition to nuclear bombardment from space, the Spectrals released a virus that effectively turns the infected into bloodthirsty zombies. The Spectral warship then crashed into the planet's surface, causing further widespread destruction.

Players take the roles of Alpha Team members. As game critic Rick Swan noted, the player characters "are hunted by the other two factions; the government wants them executed as dangerous traitors, while the Spectrals see them as uncooperative troublemakers, best suited for zombie food."

== Gameplay ==
=== Character generation ===
Each player rolls four dice and adds the sum to 48. These points are then allocated to Strength, Intelligence, Will, Health and Agility. Further dice rolls on background tables develops the character's starting experience. Skills are then chosen, and each character receives basic equipment.

=== Combat ===
Combat is broken down into 2-second segments. Players choose which combat actions to assign to movement and firing. If the target is hit, further die rolls indicate the location of the hit and how much damage was done.

== Publication history ==
In 1986, Leading Edge Games published the extremely complex military role-playing game Phoenix Command. The following year, designer Barry Nakazono designed a science-fiction role-playing game that used a simplified version of the Phoenix Command rules. He originally titled it Rhand, but then retitled it Living Steel. The rules were presented first as a boxed set in 1987 with illustrations and graphic design by Jon Conrad, Toni Dennis, Steve Huston, Scott Miller, and Maggie Parr. The product was republished in a single hardbound book in 1988.

In 1994, Leading Edge released a set of 25 mm metal miniatures that could be used with the game. The company went out of business shortly afterwards.

== Reception ==
In Issue 7 of Gateways, Ian Harac was impressed by the physical components, as well as the artwork, which he felt ranged from above-average to excellent. Harac noted, "The game's setting is extensive enough to keep anyone interested" and although there were a lot of rules, "if that doesn't faze you, then you should have no problems with them." Harac also liked that the style of the rules was integrated into the setting, which he felt gave the reader "the feeling that he or she is actually learning about the entire world, instead of just his little corner of it." Harac warned, "The [firefight] combat system in this game is complex, realistic, and deadly. Players who shoot at everything that moves will soon find themselves multicolored splatters very quickly." However, for hand-to-hand melee combat, Harac was disappointed that players had to purchase Leading Edge's Fantasy game for the melee combat rules. Harac concluded, "All in all, a very good game, though slightly flawed in some places."

In Issue 42 of Abyss, Dave Nalle called Living Steel "very nicely produced, with excellent graphics, smashing art and a great visual feel." However, he also found the game "frighteningly militaristic ... with a heavy emphasis on complex combat mechanics and shooting everything in sight as thoroughly as possible." Nalle thought the character generation system for skills was too rigid, "and essentially destructive to role-playing ... The weaknesses of the skill system make it inevitable that characters in Living Steel will be the most two-dimensional I've seen in a game system published in the last few years." Nalle thought that a certain type of gamer would be attracted to this game, "probably the same sort who thinks complexity is the true route to realism." Nalle concluded, "I think that most mature gamers can find better value elsewhere."

In Issue 33 of Challenge, Julia Martin found the game "marvelous to look at. Graphically, it is a very attractive game." But Martin noted that although, in theory, the entire universe seemed to be available for play, most of the material in this set referred to the planet of Rhand, with no clear means of leaving the planet's surface. As Martin noted, "The potential for 'high adventure' which the company claims is certainly there, but it may be hard for referees to achieve for their players with the materials presented in the game set alone." During character creation, Martin noted the problem with the character class known as Ringer, which has the ability to use high technology equipment such as Power Armor. But that equipment needs to be recharged daily, and in the post-apocalyptic setting of Rhand, there is little power to be obtained. Martin noted, "The result is that most Ringers which players will create will be played infrequently at best — a frustrating situation since these are the most detailed, motivated and best equipped characters one can generate." Martin also did not like combat, saying, "although the combat system is realistic, the methods used to achieve this realism lead to it being very complex. Every combat involves consulting a minimum of eight tables. A combat which takes seconds or minutes in game time can take a half hour or more in real time quite easily." Martin also found combat to be "incredibly deadly. The average character can easily die in his or her first combat from only one realistic wound. [...] This much realism can easily lead to bored and frustrated players." In terms of adventures, Martin warned potential gamemasters that "ideas for adventures are not presented in detail and rely mainly on rather complicated Mission Generation tables, a sort of random scenario generator system for the bare bones of an adventure. [...] Considerable referee originality and thought will have to be put into creation of adventures." Martin concluded, "Those who really enjoy realistic combat and do not mind complexity and a slower combat sequence in pursuit of it will truly enjoy Living Steel. [...] Overall, Living Steel has a fascinating historical setting, wonderful equipment, detailed character creation, problematic game systems, and little support for the referee."

In the inaugural issue of Games International, Jake Thornton found the movement and combat rules complex, but admitted that "Once you have the hang of it, the movement rules work very nicely [and] blazing away at someone is easy to work out." However, Thornton pointed out an apparent dichotomy: although "a large portion of the goodies in the box are to do with combat", the rulebook states "Living Steel should not be a game of military conquest". Despite this, he concluded by giving the game an above-average rating of 4 out of 5, saying, "All in all, Living Steel impressed me."

In Issue 42 of the French games magazine Casus Belli, Denis Beck concluded "Served by a very clear presentation, Living Steel is an original, solid and entirely worthy of interest futuristic-warrior game. However, its 'hard science' side and the complexity of some of its rules may put off some players."

Stephan Wieck reviewed Living Steel in White Wolf #9 (1988), rating it an 8 out of 10 and stated that "Living Steel is a must for the realism player or any combat oriented role-players, others should play the game a couple of times before deciding to purchase it. Leading Edge has done a remarkable job in producing such a quality product."

In his 1990 book The Complete Guide to Role-Playing Games, game critic Rick Swan thought this game had "a nifty premise ... It's a terrific setup for some unusually exciting adventures." But Swan thought the rules undercut this promise, commenting, "For the most part, they're ambiguous and difficult. Character generation takes forever and goes into far more detail than necessary ... Combat is a nightmare of dice-rolling, table-consulting and second-guessing." Swan concluded by giving the game a rating of 2.5 out of 4, saying, "Those willing to invest the time could probably whip the game into shape, but it's hardly worth the effort."

Paul Pettengale retrospectively reviewed Living Steel for Arcane magazine and stated that "it may seem odd, but if the system is hard work, the referee often pretty well forgets about it and concentrates on roleplaying through situations rather than getting the dice out. With a campaign background as fantastic as the one boasted by Living Steel, roleplaying is a pleasing prospect. So it's a shame that the game never received much support, or indeed the kind of recognition that it deserved. What's more, there's little chance of it ever being rekindled save, perhaps, for the campaign I'm sure I'll run again..."

== Reviews ==
- G.M. The Independent Fantasy Roleplaying Magazine #1
