= Arsenal (disambiguation) =

An arsenal is an establishment for the construction, repair, receipt, storage and/or issuing of arms and ammunition.

Arsenal may also refer to:

== Specific arsenals ==
- Arsenal (Central Park), originally built for the New York State Militia
- Arsenal de Paris, a military-industrial complex established south of the Bastille by Francis I
  - Arsenal Library, the only surviving building of the complex
  - Arsenal station (Paris Metro), a former metro stop in that neighborhood
- Allegheny Arsenal, American Civil War-era arsenal in Pittsburgh
- Arsenal Academy, in a former arsenal, in Columbia, South Carolina
- Augusta Arsenal, 19th-century fortification in Augusta, Georgia
- Brest Arsenal (French: Arsenal de Brest), French shipbuilder
- Foochow Arsenal, Chinese naval shipyard
- Kyiv Arsenal in Kyiv, Ukraine
- Kremlin Arsenal, in Moscow
- Rock Island Arsenal, Rock Island, Illinois
- Royal Arsenal, Woolwich, London
- South Carolina State Arsenal, in Charleston, South Carolina
- Venetian Arsenal, "one of the earliest large-scale industrial enterprises in history"
- Warsaw Arsenal, the scene of heavy fighting during the Warsaw Insurrection of 1794
- Watertown Arsenal, major 19th century American arsenal in Watertown, Massachusetts, near Boston

== Places named after arsenals ==
- Arsenal station (Paris Metro), a closed station on the Paris Metro
- Arsenal Center for the Arts in Watertown, Massachusetts
- Arsenal Hill (disambiguation), several places
- Arsenal Oak at Augusta State University, named for the Augusta Arsenal
- Arsenal Stadium in Highbury, London
- Arsenal Street (disambiguation), various places named or relating to an Arsenal Street
- Arsenal Technical High School, an Indianapolis, Indiana high school which was formerly a U.S. civil war arsenal
- Arsenal tube station, a station on the London Underground in Highbury, named after Arsenal FC
- Arsenal, Mauritius, a village in Pamplemousses District, Mauritius
- Arsenalna (Kyiv Metro) (Ukrainian: Арсенальна), a station on the Kyiv Metro
- Bibliothèque de l'Arsenal (Library of the Arsenal), in Paris
- Woolwich Arsenal station, a mainline train and DLR station in London, named after the Woolwich Arsenal
- Arsenal (Vienna), a former military complex of buildings

== Art, entertainment, and media ==
=== Music ===
- Arsenal, the backing band in the Broadway musical Rock of Ages, since 2005
- Arsenal (American band), former indie rock band
- Arsenal (Belgian band), electronic music band
- Arsenal (jazz band), Russian jazz band, led by saxophonist Alexey Kozlov

=== Others ===
- Arsenal (Marvel Comics), Marvel Comics villain and antagonist of the Avengers
- Arsenal (1929 film), Soviet war film
- Arsenal (2017 film), American thriller film
- Arsenal/Surrealist Subversion, periodical published sporadically in Chicago
- Arsenal Institute for Film and Video Art, Berlin, Germany
  - Kino Arsenal, cinema within the Institute
- Arsenal (DC Comics), various characters from DC Comics
  - Roy Harper (character), the most prominent bearer of the codename "Arsenal"
- Arsenal (game), a first-person shooter game on Roblox
- Arsenal (Perpetrated Press), a tabletop game supplement published 2002

== Companies ==
- Arsenal Cider House, small-batch cider manufacturer in Pittsburgh, named for the Allegheny Arsenal
- E-Arsenal or Arsenal, arms manufacturing company based in Tallinn, Estonia

== Sports ==
=== Association football ===
- Arsenal F.C., football team from Highbury, London, England
- Arsenal Atividades Desportivas Sport Club, from Santa Luzia, Brazil
- Arsenal Česká Lípa, from the city of Česká Lípa in northern Czech Republic
- Arsenal de Sarandí, from Sarandí, Argentina
- Arsenal FC (Lesotho), from Maseru, Lesotho
- Arsenal F.C. (Honduras), from Roatán, Honduras
- Arsenal W.F.C., the women's team of the London club
- Arsenal Wanderers, from Arsenal, Pamplemousses, Mauritius
- Berekum Arsenal, from Berekum, Ghana
- FC Arsenal Kharkiv (Ukrainian: ФК Арсенал Харків), from Kharkiv, Ukraine
- FC Arsenal Kyiv (Ukrainian: ФК Арсенал Київ), from Kyiv, Ukraine, dissolved in 2019
- FC Arsenal Tula (Russian: ФК Арсенал Тула), from Tula, Russia
- FC Arsenal-Kyivshchyna Bila Tserkva (Ukrainian: ФК Арсенал-Київщина Біла Церква), from Bila Tserkva, Ukraine
- FK Arsenal Kragujevac, from Kragujevac, Serbia
- FK Arsenal Tivat, from Tivat, Montenegro
- S.C. Braga (nicknamed Os Arsenalistas), from Braga, Portugal
- SV Arsenal, from Nieuw Amsterdam, Suriname
- FC Arsenal Dzerzhinsk from Dzerzhinsk, Belarus

== Transportation ==
- Arsenal (car), car manufactured in the United Kingdom in the late 1890s
- Arsenal Crossley, Estonian armored car, manufactured in 1920s
- Arsenal de l'Aéronautique, French military aircraft manufacturer
- Arsenal VG-33, World War II French fighter aircraft
- Aurus Arsenal, a luxury minivan

== Weaponry ==
- Arsenal AD, Bulgarian arms manufacturer
- Arsenal Shipka, Bulgarian sub-machine gun
- Arsenal submachine gun, Estonian submachine gun
