= 2001 ENnie Award winners =

- Awarded for: Best role-playing games of previous year
- Country: United Kingdom & United States
- Presented by: Gen Con
- First award: 2001
- Website: Archive of 2001 ENnie Awards

The following are the winners of the 1st annual ENnie Awards, held in 2001:

== List of winners ==
Category	Gold Winner
Best Adventure	Death in Freeport (Green Ronin Publishing)
Best Rulebook or Accessory	The Book of Eldritch Might (Malhavoc Press)
Best Setting	Iron Kingdoms (Privateer Press)
Best Writer	The Book of Eldritch Might (Monte Cook - Malhavoc Press)
Best Art (Interior)	The Longest Night (Matt Wilson & Brian Snoddy - Privateer Press)
Best Art (Cover)	The Longest Night (Matt Wilson - Privateer Press)
Best Cartography	Madness in Freeport (Todd Gamble - Green Ronin Publishing)
Best Editor	The Book of Eldritch Might (Sue Weinlein Cook — Malhavoc Press)
Best Free Product	The Wizard's Amulet (Necromancer Games)
Best Official Website	Malhavoc Press
Best Fan Website	Jamis Buck's RPG Generators (James Buck)
Best Publisher (Overall)	Privateer Press
