= Iron Heroes =

Tabletop role-playing game

- Cover
- Designers: Mike Mearls, Adam Windsor
- Publishers: Fiery Dragon Productions
- Publication: 2005
- Genres: Fantasy
- Systems: d20 System

Iron Heroes (previously also known as Monte Cook Presents: Iron Heroes; originally announced as Iron Lore) is a variant Player's Handbook for the d20 System of role-playing games, in the tradition of Arcana Unearthed. It incorporates the core d20 mechanic, while introducing new rules options, differently-balanced classes, an entirely new feat system, and changes to the way skills and feats operate. It is intended to allow players to take on traditional challenges at the same levels that their D&D counterparts would be able to, without recourse to magic items or high spellcasting. It was written by Mike Mearls, is currently owned and updated by Adam Windsor, and published by Fiery Dragon Productions.

== Feat changes ==
Iron Heroes implements a novel "feat mastery" system, with the inclusion of more advanced feats that build off the core ability. Each class is given access to different feat masteries to a greater or lesser extent; an archer will have greater access to masteries related to ranged combat, while a berserker will have greater access to masteries related to melee weapons that take advantage of a character's great strength. Characters gain access to more advanced masteries as they increase in level and gain new feats. The core feats from the d20 system are also included, and can be taken by any character that meets the requirements.

In addition, characters receive feats more often than in the stock d20 rules, and many classes are given bonus feats within their area of expertise.

== Classes ==
Iron Heroes includes nine base classes and a special arcanist class for games in which magic is implemented. Aside from the arcanist, no character is given supernatural abilities, in keeping with the low-magic and gritty feel designer Mike Mearls intended for the game. Some classes have different attack bonuses for different types of weapons, as opposed to the standard d20 convention of using a "base attack bonus" for all weapons. Many classes have access to a "token pool", which allows the character to perform special abilities that use tokens, which are gained through various actions or conditions- akin to rage meters in certain fighting games. Their hit points are generated with a very small die (a four-sided die) with a class-based bonus. This reduces the role of chance in determining a character's ability to withstand damage. Characters also gain access to a "reserve pool" of hit points that they may call upon between battles to restore their hit points, and which replenishes each day. However, almost all healing magic has been removed from the game. The Iron Heroes Player's Companion supplement added three more classes, including a second with supernatural abilities.

=== Core rules ===
==== Archer ====
The Archer is the ranged weapon specialist, replacing D&D's Arcane Archer and Ranger classes. The class receives the best attack bonus in the game when using ranged weapons (advancing at 1.25/level, for a max of +25 at 20th level), though the class' base attack progression for melee weapons is poor; the class also receives a decent defense growth, though HP and skill increases are merely average. The class also receives an Aim Pool, which is gathered by spending actions targeting a single enemy; the tokens from this pool may be used to power the special abilities of the class. As such, the Archer excels against single, strong enemies. The class also gains a number of bonus feats that must be spent on archery feats (which the class also has excellent access to), allowing Archer characters to diversify their abilities and remain effective against any opponent.

==== Armiger ====
The Armiger is a warrior with a special focus on the optimum use of armor. The class has excellent access to armor-related feats, and gains an Armor Pool to fuel several armor-related abilities that maximize the character's defenses or wear out the opposition. Armigers receive a few other abilities related to being simply tougher than everyone else, and being able to wear armor better than anyone. Armigers have good HP growth, though low skill access.

==== Berserker ====
The Berserker is a strong melee fighter, generally the Iron Heroes equivalent of the D&D barbarian. The class gains a token pool called a Fury Pool, which may be replenished by taking damage, seeing allies fall before him, or yelling or beating on the character's shield. Fury tokens are mainly used to start and maintain various rage-style abilities, though the class receives a selection of other abilities that largely focus on overpowering the opposition. As a class that often takes damage, it has the best HP growth in the game and good BAB, in addition to good access to Power feats. However, Berserkers take significant penalties when using armor, have a low defense score, and do not gain many skill points. Furthermore, the class does have "natural armor": an impenetrable armor, which, at level 10, is equal to the best available medium armor (reducing damage by 1d6).

==== Executioner ====
The Executioner class focuses on crippling a foe as well as killing him. The class gains an excellent Sneak Attack progression, along with an Execution Pool that allows the character to weaken opponents before killing them, or simply leave them incapacitated while the character focuses on more important opponents. Notable features are excellent access to any melee-oriented feats, and the unique ability to apply feats that normally are only usable with powerful weapons to any weapon. The class has access to skill groups related to stealth, and gains above average HP growth, along with average defense.

==== Harrier ====
The Harrier is built around the use of speed and finesse in combat. Unlike most Iron Heroes classes, the Harrier does not gain access to a token pool. The major class ability is a bonus to attack, damage, and defense, usable only when moving. While a Harrier may not make use of a full attack action under most circumstances, other class abilities compensate for that particular handicap, eventually resulting in the ability to make a full attack while still gaining a normal move action. The class has the best progression of defense related feats in the game and above-average access to finesse feats, combined with average HP and skills.

==== Hunter ====
The Hunter's abilities are focused on tactical combat within a group, making use of the battlefield to confound enemies and aid the coordination of allies. The primary ability of the Hunter is the ability to transfer tokens from its own pool to token pools of allies, allowing them to attack at their best for much longer. The class gains a number of other abilities that are focused on teamwork and terrain use. Hunters receive access to a number of tactically oriented feats, along with above-average progression in HP, skills, and defense.

==== Man-at-Arms ====
The Man-at-Arms has no real class abilities; instead, the class gains a large number of bonus feats, much like the Fighter class in D&D. However, the Man-at-Arms differs from the D&D fighter in several important ways. The class gains good access to all feat types, allowing a character to advance in any direction that the player chooses. For flexibility, Men-at-Arms also gain access to "Wildcard" feats, which the character may swap out each day for another feat, allowing a high-level Man-at-Arms to gain decent proficiency in whatever type of feat is best for the situation in only a few rounds. The Man-at-Arms is the only class with the freedom to choose its skill groups upon creation.

==== Thief ====
The Thief is a rough equivalent to the D&D Rogue. The class is similar to the harrier as a speedy combatant but does not gain a token pool. However, the class gains the most skills in the game, access to more skill groups than any other class, and a higher cap on skill ranks. Thief characters may create specialized alternate personas, gaining bonuses to Bluff and Disguise checks while using these specific disguises. The class does gain access to a handful of combat-related abilities revolving around stealth, along with a medium Sneak Attack progression (capping at 7d6). The HP progression is moderate, and the defense progression is the better of the two progressions used in the game.

==== Weaponmaster ====
The Weaponmaster is precisely what the name suggests - a master of a single specialized weapon. The class gains tokens against individual enemies by successfully attacking them, and may spend the tokens gained on certain special maneuvers. The Weaponmaster may choose a single chosen category of feats to specialize in and another category to receive good access to, allowing the player to specialize in any particular weapon. The specialized weapon is used with a base attack bonus similar to the Archer; other weapons are used with a lower base attack bonus.

==== Arcanist ====
The Arcanist was the only class in Iron Heroes capable of using magic prior to the release of the Iron Heroes Player's Companion. Most spells are powered by a mana pool, which is a token pool that only refills after a night's rest. However, the class does gain access to some powerful magical abilities that can be used freely, as well as the ability to make pacts with otherworldly powers in return for bonuses. True Sorcery, a book of d20 skill-based magic produced by Green Ronin Publishing, has a section devoted to using the book in Iron Heroes, and substantially expands and modifies the Arcanist class.

=== Player's companion ===
==== Dedicate ====
The Dedicate is a new class introduced in the Iron Heroes Player's Companion. This class follows the archetype of the core Dungeons & Dragons paladin: a warrior with a very strong sense of commitment and focus. The Dedicate is the only class with an excellent Base Defense Bonus progression, which makes up for their lower HP generation. The Dedicate has good access to a weapon-based feat mastery as well as good access to the Defense mastery, with an average access to the Lore feat mastery.

==== Myrmidon ====
The Myrmidon is a new class introduced in the Iron Heroes Player's Companion. This class represents ruthlessly efficient fighters that take advantage of whatever opportunity he or she can find on the battlefield. The Myrmidon has many combat abilities that focus on creating or taking advantage of opportunities on the battlefield. They gain good access to the Tactics feat mastery, and can have good access to a small list of other feat masteries. They can also choose average access to any feat category of their choice. This flexibility in feat selection is second only to the Man-At-Arms.

==== Spiritualist ====
The Spiritualist is a new magic-using class introduced in the Iron Heroes Player's Companion. Unlike the Arcanist, who draws mana himself and shapes his own spells, the Spiritualist makes pacts with otherworldly creatures to create their magic effects. The Spiritualist's magic ability is based on a Pact token pool, and their magic is broken down into 18 different Rituals, instead of the traditional schools of magic.

== Skills ==
Iron Heroes incorporates two notable variants in its use of skills. One is the use of skill "challenges", which allow a character to accept a penalty on a skill roll in order to perform a nonstandard or tactically meaningful action. Often these challenges will require the use of several skills to perform especially complicated actions.

Another variant is the use of "skill groups", by means of which each class may buy several skills at highly reduced cost. No skill is forbidden or especially restricted in level to any class. Skills are also often expanded or tweaked to offer more options to players.

== Combat ==
Combat is managed as in Dungeons & Dragons, with the following exceptions:

- Armor does not make it harder for characters to be hit; instead, it reduces the damage characters take
- Skills may be used to perform heroic stunts, making use of terrain or an opponent's weakness to grant combat bonuses or penalties
- Surprise and initiative grant more advantages
- Characters may accept penalties to their combat actions to gain additional benefits

These changes, in addition to other minor tweaks, are intended to offer greater realism and flexibility over standard d20 combat.

== Setting ==
Iron Heroes is designed to be setting-independent; while a sample adventure setting is provided, it is meant only to illustrate the general atmosphere that often fits an Iron Heroes game best, and contains few details. Of relevance:

- Humanity was once enslaved by a greater race, now vanished.
- Civilization is diffuse and constantly imperiled by monsters and petty warlords.
- Knowledge of the world is limited and is ripe for exploration.

Dungeon masters are encouraged to create their own settings to best fit the needs of their players.

== Legal threats ==
Iron Heroes was originally intended to be released under the name of Iron Lore, but a threatened lawsuit by Iron Lore Entertainment led to a name change near the end of the development process.

== Ownership ==
Iron Heroes was originally titled Monte Cook Presents: Iron Heroes and published by Monte Cook's imprint Malhavoc Press. In March 2007 Sue Cook announced the sale of Iron Heroes to Adam Windsor. Adam is the creator of two popular Iron Heroes Adventures, Dark Harbor and Blood Storm, and has been the official Iron Heroes answerman and errata-maker on the Iron Heroes message board since soon after the game was published. The Iron Heroes community welcomed this change, especially after it was announced that it would mean that new rulebooks and an updated main book would be produced.

== Published books ==
In addition to the core book, several supplements have been released.

- A supplement for Dungeon Masters is available, under the name Mastering Iron Heroes (ISBN 1-58846-797-X). It includes rule variants, tips for running an Iron Heroes adventure, and villain classes.
- In the same vein, The Iron Heroes Bestiary (ISBN 1-58846-949-2) offers monsters specifically intended for use against Iron Heroes characters, as well as new feats and villain classes.
- The Iron Heroes Battlebox (ISBN 1-894693-93-0) includes accessories and maps useful in running an Iron Heroes game.
- An affiliated company, Fiery Dragon Productions, released two adventures for Iron Heroes under the names Dark Harbor (ISBN 1-894693-94-9) and Blood Storm, and is now the official publisher of Iron Heroes itself.
- Another affiliated company, Goodman Games, released two supplemental adventures, To Duel with Dragons (ISBN 1-300-00103-8) and Song of the Blade (ISBN 1-300-00068-6).
- A Revised edition of the Iron Heroes Variant Player's Handbook was released by Fiery Dragon Productions on May 1, 2007. The Revised Edition contains all of the errata that has been collected since the original release.
- The Iron Heroes Player's Companion was released by Fiery Dragon Productions on July 4, 2007. This release contains 3 new classes: the Dedicate, the Myrmidon, and the Spiritualist. The Spiritualist is a new magic-using class that uses a different magic system than the Arcanist. The Player's Companion also includes 21 new Traits, and new feat masteries for all of the feat categories.

== See also ==
- Arsenal (Perpetrated Press)
