= Invisible Sun (disambiguation) =

Invisible Sun may refer to:

- Invisible Sun, a song by English rock group the Police
- Invisible Sun (Liam Gallagher song), a song by English musician Liam Gallagher
- Invisible Sun (role-playing game), a surrealistic fantasy tabletop role-playing game by Monte Cook
