= Fiery Dragon Productions =

Fiery Dragon Productions is a role-playing game and wargame publisher.

== History ==
Fiery Dragon Productions was formed by James Bell, Jason Kempton and Todd Secord in 2000 in Toronto. These authors started the company to publish adventures for the d20 System, with their first adventure NeMoren's Vault (2000) being one of the earliest such adventures published. Fiery Dragon published the adventures The Silver Summoning (2001) and To Stand on Hallowed Ground/Swords Against Deception (2001) by Mike Mearls and the company was invited to join the Sword & Sorcery imprint of White Wolf Publishing. They were the fourth group to become part of the imprint, after Necromancer Games and the Sword & Sorcery Studios and ArtHaus divisions of White Wolf. One of the first supplements from Fiery Dragon through Sword & Sorcery supported the first Rappan Athuk adventure (2001) from Necromancer Games, and Fiery Dragon kept working with Monte Cook through his company Malhavoc Press even after leaving Sword & Sorcery in 2002.

Fiery Dragon had begun by publishing adventures on its own and at Sword & Sorcery, but moved more toward publishing illustrated counters to represent characters and monsters, which they had begun including in NeMoren's Vault. Fiery Dragon continued including counters with their adventures up through 2002 when they brought on artist Claudio Pozas. Pozas could design counters that Fiery Dragon could publish in volume, starting with the Sword & Sorcery publication Counter Collection I: The Usual Suspects (2001), their first book to consist of nothing but counters and followed later by boxes and tins of counters.

Fiery Dragon was releasing almost entirely sets of counters by 2003 and 2004, including the publications Counter Collection 5: Summoned Creatures (2004) and Counter Collection Gold (2004), which between them depicted every one of the base Dungeons & Dragons 3.5e creatures. All adventures published by Fiery Dragons as well as some Counter Collections were until 2004 set in their own campaign setting of Karathis. Fiery Dragon resumed publications aside from counters in 2005 but moved away from using their setting Kerathis to instead publish licensed backgrounds. Fiery Dragon had multiple licenses with Malhavoc Press, so they released both adventures and counters for Arcana Evolved (2005) and Ptolus (2006-2007). Fiery Dragon also became the main publisher for the d20 Iron Heroes game (2005-2008).

Fiery Dragon published seventh edition Tunnels & Trolls (2005, 2008) as well as a Dungeons & Dragons fourth-edition book with updated statistics for the best creatures from the Creature Collection (2009) by White Wolf. Fiery Dragon has also published several games in their series of "Counter Strike" mini-games. Fiery Dragon resumed mostly publishing counters once D&D fourth edition was released.

== Products ==
Key products include:

- Tunnels & Trolls 30th Anniversary Edition
- Ptolus campaign setting for Dungeons & Dragons
- Arcana Evolved campaign setting for Dungeons & Dragons
- Iron Heroes campaign setting for Dungeons & Dragons
- Counterstrike Wargames line of small wargames.
