= The Diamond Throne =

The Diamond Throne may refer to:

- The first book in The Elenium series of fantasy novels by David Eddings
- The Diamond Throne (Arcana Unearthed), a 2003 role-playing game supplement
- The Diamond throne or Vajrasana at Bodh Gaya, India
