= Ivan Smirnov (guitar player) =

Ivan Smirnov Иван Смирнов

Background information
- Born: 9 September 1955; Moscow
- Died: 15 November 2018 (aged 63)
- Genres: Fusion, folk-jazz, ethno jazz, New Acoustic, New Flamenco
- Instrument(s): Acoustic guitar, electric guitar
- Years active: 1975–2018
- Website: Ivansmirnov.com

Ivan Nikolayevich Smirnov (Russian: Иван Николаевич Смирнов; 9 September 1955 in Moscow, USSR – 15 November 2018) was regarded as one of the greatest guitar players in Russia. He was proficient in many different styles, such as fusion, world, Russian folk, folk-jazz, and new flamenco. Smirnov lived in Russia and played with musicians such as Mikhail Smirnov, Sergey Klevensky, Dmitry Safonov, and Aleksei Kozlov.

== Affiliations ==
- 1975—1979: Moscow's fusion group Second Breath (Russian: Второе дыхание).
- 1979−1983: Experimental electronic music ensemble Boomerang (Бумеранг) under direction of Eduard Artemyev.
- 1983: Vocal Instrumental Ensemble Blue Guitars (Голубые Гитары).
- 1984−1990: Jazz-rock ensemble Arsenal (Арсенал) under direction of Aleksei Kozlov.
- 1990: Work under his own music projects, concerts with his own group, composing music for the cinema and studio work.

== Recognition ==
- The Best Guitar Player of the year (1995, Russia, Music Box Journal Professional Request).
- The Best Guitar Player of the year (1996, Russia, Music Box Journal Professional Request).
- The Best Fusion Guitar Player (1994, Russia, Jam (Джем) television program, Jury: Allan Holdsworth, Steve Lukather, Scott Henderson, Bruce Kulick).
- The Best Guitar Player (1994, Russia, Totals-94 (Итоги-94) Professional Request).

== Discography ==
=== Solo work ===
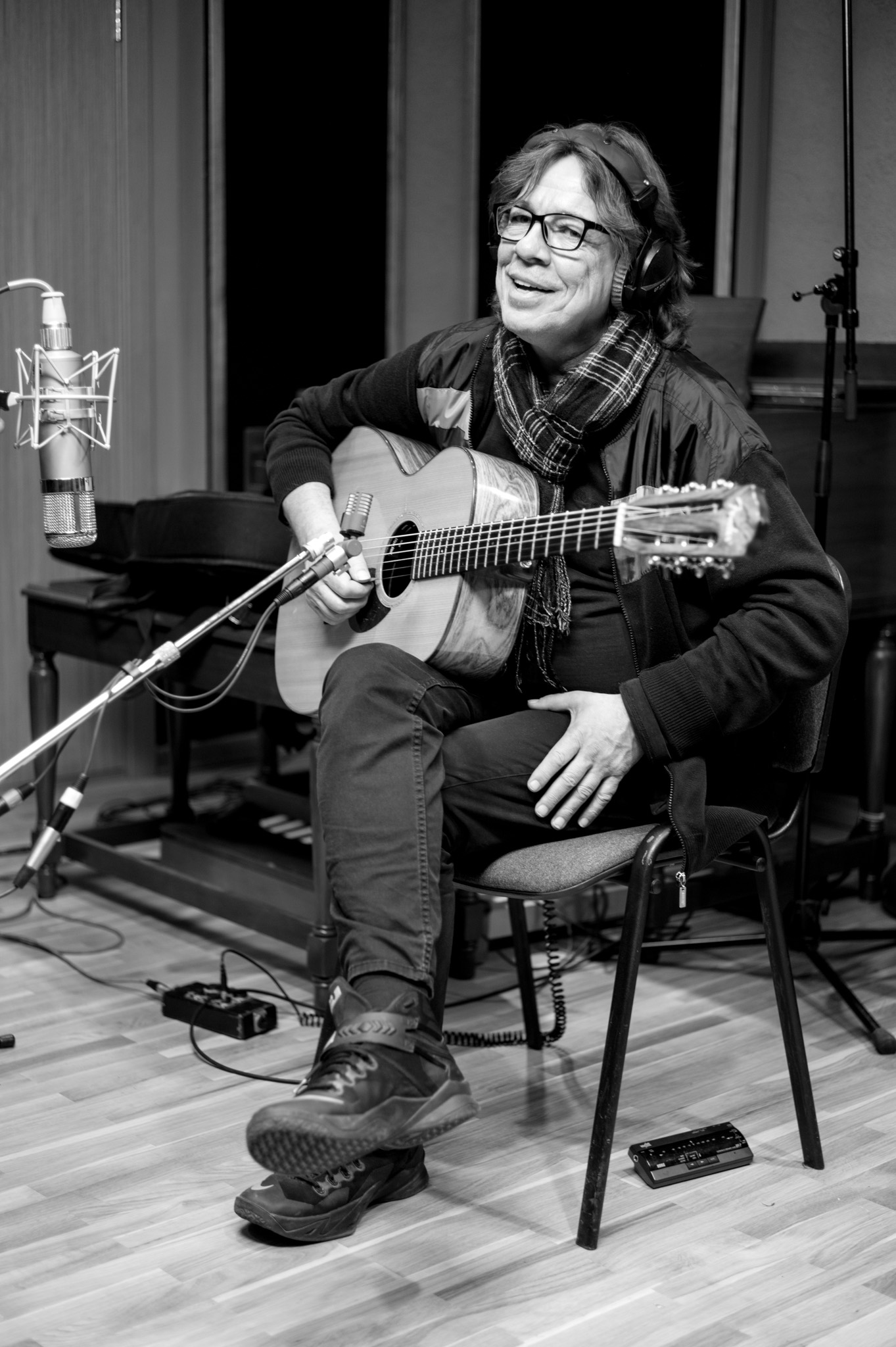
Ivan Smirnov on November 14, 2016

- 1996 Merry-go-Round Man (Карусельный дед), CD/MC, — Music Box records. MB0001-2.
- 1999 At the other end of the world (За тридевять земель), CD / MC, — Smirnov Records. ISCD 99-001.
- 2003 The Land Where The Sun Slumbers (Страна, где ночует солнце), live in Le Club (Russia), 2 CD/МС, — Sketis records. ISMC 99-001.

=== Collaborations ===
- 1986 Arsenal ensemble, Pulse-3 (Пульс-3) — LP record, Melodiya record company С60.23883009
- 1991 Arsenal ensemble, Arsenal 5 (Арсенал 5), LP, Melodiya record company.
- 1991 Arsenal ensemble, Arsenal 6 (Арсенал 6), LP, Melodiyya record company.
- 1989—1991 Aleksei Kozlov and Arsenal ensemble, CD, Melodiya record company USSR SUCD 60-00 134.
- 1997 Aleksei Kozlov and Arsenal ensemble Burned by time (Опалённые временем) 4 CD, — IT company/A. Kozlov. CDRDM 711194, CDRDM 711795, CDRDM 712196, CDRDM 712199.
- 1998 Intermezzo Hand Made Work, CD, — Smakauz production. SP.01 98.
- 2001 Virtuoso parallels (Параллели Виртуозов) / 10 years of ELKO Technology company, CD, Limited Edition, — RGB ELKO.
- 2002 Guitar players of Russia (Гитаристы России), the set of the best guitar players of Russia, CD, — special edition of the publishing house Salun AV (Салон AV in Russian).
- 2002 These guys with the guitar (Эти парни с гитарой), the set of the best guitar players of Russia, CD, — special edition of the publishing house Salun AV (Салон AV), CD, 1994 — Strings records STR 001 2.
- 2004 Crimean Holiday (Крымские каникулы). Mikhail Smirnov, Ivan Smirnov. CD.

== Media ==
=== Music ===
- music.download.com

=== Video ===
Washburn Days In Russia / featuring: Michael Angelo (U.S.), Ivan Smirnov, Timur Quitelashvili (Тимур Квителашвили in Russian), Igor Boiko, Dmitry Maloletov, Dmitry Chetvergov / VHS-cassette, 1995 Music Box Records MB 002-3.

== Literature ==
- Aleksandr Alekseev. Who is who in Russian rock music. AST: Astrel: Harvest, 2009. — p. 446-448. — ISBN 978-5-17-048654-0 (AST). — ISBN 978-5-271-24160-4 (Astrel). — ISBN 978-985-16-7343-4 (Harvest).
