= Iron Lore =

Iron Lore may refer to:

- Iron Lore Entertainment, a video game developer founded in 2000 and closed in 2008
- The original name of Iron Heroes, a variant Player's Handbook for the d20 System of role-playing games
