= NeMoren's Vault =

NeMoren's Vault is a 2000 role-playing game adventure published by Fiery Dragon Productions.

== Plot summary ==
NeMoren's Vault is an adventure in which an introductory fantasy adventure has 1st–3rd level player characters uncover the dark secrets of Baron Paytro NeMoren's underground vault with ready‑to‑play materials included.

== Publication history ==
James Bell, Jason Kempton and Todd Secord formed Fiery Dragon Productions in 2000 in Toronto to publish adventures for the d20 System, with their first adventure Nemoren's Vault (2000) being one of the earliest such adventures published. These authors started the company

== Reviews ==
- Pyramid
- Polyhedron #145
- Places to Go, People to Be (Issue 17 - May 2001)
