= A Paladin in Hell =

1998 role-playing game adventure

Cover art by Fred Fields, 1998

A Paladin in Hell is an adventure published by TSR in 1998 for the fantasy role-playing game Advanced Dungeons & Dragons (AD&D). The adventure was inspired by a black & white illustration with the same title that appeared in the original edition of the Players Handbook.

== Description ==
A Paladin in Hell is an adventure using the rules of the second edition of AD&D. The difficult adventure is scaled for 4–6 player characters of levels 15–20 who have a combined total of at least 2.25 million experience points and are well-equipped with magic items and powerful enchanted weapons.

== Plot summary ==
The funeral of an illustrious paladin is interrupted when the temple and everyone in it are suddenly transported to the plane of the Nine Hells. The player characters must locate the temple and return it to its proper place.

=== Part 1 ===
The party must seek advice from a powerful but unfriendly wizard, Emirikol the Chaotic, after finding their way through a metal storm that circles his fortress. Emirikol tells them that the temple is trapped between two planes of Hell, and the only way to reach it will be to take a special ship down the River Styx. The ship has a demonic crew who might rise up in mutiny.

=== Part 2 ===
Reaching Hell, the adventurers find that even their mightiest weapons and armor have lost some power, and that spells cast by Good characters might go awry or not work at all. Nonetheless, the adventurers must fight their way through the citadel of an archdemon in order to reach the temple.

=== Part 3 ===
Once in the temple, the party must explore it to find a way to break the spell that keeps it in Hell. Their task will be further complicated as they meet the prisoners, some of whom have been corrupted by Hell and are now antagonists. The adventurers face a moral quandary, for if they kill any prisoners, they will condemn those souls to remain in Hell.

The original illustration "A Paladin in Hell" by David Sutherland III that appeared in the first edition of the Players Handbook, 1978

== Publication history ==
When Monte Cook was a young D&D player, he was fascinated by two illustrations: one in the first edition of the Players Handbook (1978) by David Sutherland III titled "A Paladin in Hell" showing an armored warrior standing on a precipice while beset by demons; and another in the first edition of the Dungeon Masters Guide (1977) by Dave Trampier titled "Emirikol the Chaotic" showing a wizard on horseback casting a magic ray from the tip of his finger. Following the takeover of TSR by Wizards of the Coast in 1997, Wizards decided to celebrate the 25th anniversary of D&D with a series of AD&D adventures inspired by the early days of TSR publications. Monte Cook, now a senior designer for Wizards/TSR, created an adventure titled A Paladin in Hell, later saying, "The "A Paladin in Hell" piece from the first-edition Players Handbook was so iconic to me that, when given the chance, I wrote a whole second edition module about it." Cook also included Emirikol the Chaotic as a non-player character.

The new adventure published by TSR in 1998 was a 64-page softcover book with interior art by Arnie Swekel and cartography by Todd Gamble. The cover art was by Fred Fields, who created a color rendering of Dave Sutherland's original black & white image.

== Reception ==
In the French magazine Backstab, Michaël Croitoriu was not impressed with A Paladin in Hell, finding it only feasible for high-level "powergamers." Although he admitted that the adventure was "a veritable nightmare of ingenuity" and that designer Monte Cook "had a field day", he noted that "For gamers, it's a different story. Between the loss of '+2' to all their weapons and armor, and the proliferation of monsters, one wonders how a Sunday powergamer team will survive." Croitoriu concluded, "If you want good advice, do not engage lightly in this adventure, otherwise you will have to burn your most precious character sheets." He gave the adventure a below-average rating of 6 out of 10 "for powergamers, the real ones", and a very poor rating of only 3 out of 10 "for everyone else".

Wayne McLaren, writing for SF Site Reviews, commented, "Much like another classic adventure, The [sic] Tomb of Horrors, this module will find players failing much more often than they succeed. Between the pace that the adventure demands and the harsh conditions of adventuring in Hell, players will be hard pressed to solve the riddle of the temple, much less survive the onslaught of literally hundreds of demons and devils." McLaren concluded, "for all those DMs out there, whether you are looking for something to do over a long weekend, bored with your current crop of players or just want to laugh evilly to yourself while reading the nasty, nasty, nasty stuff waiting for your intrepid adventurers between these pages, A Paladin in Hell is a great choice."

In his 2014 book Designers & Dragons: The '70s, game historian Shannon Appelcline recalled the "Satanic Panic" of the early 1980s, when TSR had removed devils and demons from their products following a raft of negative publicity. Appelcline commented on the decision to produce a product 15 years later that specifically contained a lot of demons and devils, saying, "Wizards proved that they weren't afraid of angry mothers by placing [demons and devils] forefront in publications like Hellgate Keep (1998) for Forgotten Realms, A Paladin in Hell (1998), and Guide to Hell (1999). This was an ironic move, as Wizards had removed demons and devils from Magic: The Gathering in 1995 and wouldn't restore them until 2002."

== Reviews ==
- Dragão Brasil (Issue 46 - Jan 1999)
- Realms of Fantasy
