= The Book of Eldritch Might =

- Publisher: Malhavoc Press
- Publication date: 2001

The Book of Eldritch Might is a 2001 supplement for d20 System role-playing games published by Malhavoc Press.

== Contents ==
The Book of Eldritch Might is a supplement in which new and powerful options are presented for spellcasters.

== Publication history ==
Shannon Appelcline noted that after Monte Cook founded Malhavoc Press, and publishing through the Sword and Sorcery Studios imprint, he "kicked things off with The Book of Eldritch Might (2001), a volume full of feats, prestige classes, spells and other expansions for the Dungeons & Dragons game. Like White Wolf's Creature Collection and Fiery Dragon's Counter Collection, Eldritch Might pushed the boundaries of the topics that d20 books could cover. It also inspired hordes of imitators." Appelcline speculated that "The Legend of the Steel General (2001) might have been the first d20 commercial PDF. Monte Cook's The Book of Eldritch Might (2001) was more of a game changer, as it was the first commercial book published exclusively as a PDF that was released by a print publisher - in this case White Wolf. Though Legend might have shown there was some value in PDF publishing, Eldritch Might was the book that showed that major manufacturers might be able to publish PDF-only."

== Reception ==
- The Book of Eldritch Might won at the 2001 ENnie Awards for Best Rulebook or Accessory, Best Writer, and Best Editor.

== Reviews ==
- Pyramid
- Black Gate
- Polyhedron #148 (Oct., 2001)
- Asgard #1
