= Web enhancement =

A web enhancement is a bonus expansion to a role-playing game product, that can be read and/or downloaded from the website of the company that published the role-playing product it is associated with.

== Concept ==
The web enhancement concept was created by Sue Weinlein Cook, who was an editor at Tactical Studies Rules, Inc. (TSR) and later the brand manager at Wizards of the Coast (WotC). There is a common belief that web enhancements are created from content cut from the published products, but many of them are specifically commissioned as bonus material.

== Wizards of the Coast ==
=== Dungeons & Dragons ===
More than 90 web enhancements were created for Dungeons & Dragons 3rd edition role-playing game products. Some products had more than one web enhancement created for them.

=== Wheel of Time ===
At one time Wizards of the Coast had a licence to create material for The Wheel of Time Roleplaying Game and created at least one web enhancement for it.

=== d20 Modern ===
At least seven web enhancements were created for products in the d20 Modern product line.

== Other companies ==
Several other role-playing publishers also started to produce online documents that they refer to as web enhancements. These include: Green Ronin, Fantasy Flight Games, and Paizo.
