= The Diamond Throne (Arcana Unearthed) =

The Diamond Throne is a 2003 role-playing game supplement published by Malhavoc Press for Arcana Unearthed.

== Contents ==
The Diamond Throne is a supplement in which the Diamond Throne setting is expanded with new prestige classes, monsters, and magic items alongside a gazetteer detailing its giant‑ruled lands, wondrous locales, and dangerous foes.

== Reviews ==
- Backstab #47
- Realms of Fantasy
- RPGNow Downloader Monthly (Issue 9 - Sep 2003)
