= Invisible Sun (role-playing game) =

Surreal fantasy tabletop role-playing game

- Designers: Monte Cook
- Publishers: Monte Cook Games
- Publication: 2018; 7 years ago
- Genres: Surrealistic fantasy

Invisible Sun is a surrealistic modern fantasy tabletop role-playing game written by Monte Cook, published in 2018.

== Game ==
=== Setting ===
The characters the players take on in the game are various types of magic-users, collectively called Vislae. The setting is called the Actuality, consisting of a series of differing worlds arranged in a pattern called The Path of Suns. Our world is seen as a pale and illusory reflection of these worlds. The center and starting point of the setting is Satyrine, a large city devastated by war. "The setting is surreal, bringing to mind post World War I decadent Berlin, Neil Gaiman's Sandman comics and the films of Guillermo del Toro", leaving our world behind. Characters slipping back into "Shadow", the game's name for our world, is used as an in-universe explanation for player absences. Another major theme is secrets which the characters can pursue. The game material itself also contains mysteries for the players to figure out.

=== Game mechanics ===
The game mechanics of Invisible Sun are based on the Cypher System, introduced with the Numenera game, with some modifications to simplify involved math and allow for more complex characters and powerful and unpredictable magic. Players have a significant influence on the stories, as character goals play a big role within the rules. Another game mechanic provides different experience points for successes and failures of the characters, which makes setbacks a required part of the story to properly advance a character.

=== Game materials ===
The game comes in the form of an unusual, elaborate box, comprising a great number of components, called the Black Cube. It contains four books, ca. 1000 cards, the Tarot-like Sooth Deck, character sheets, handouts, tokens, dice, posters, and an artbook. The "game developers also created an Invisible Sun mobile application (really just a website) to accommodate side scenes for individual or groups of characters that are away from the table and even possibly without the GM." This app provides a digital version of physical components of the Sooth deck and associated references from The Gate, but no additional content.

== Reception ==
Reviewer Luke Finewalker commented that the Black Cube was elaborately produced and quite expensive, which together with the advertising of limited availability expressed a certain exclusivity.

Forbes contributor Rob Wieland judged: "Invisible Sun is a dense game that rewards in-depth meditation on character", published in form of "the strangest boxed set ever created for any medium. It is also immensely fascinating." He found the price high but pointed to the cheaper digital form that was published in 2020.

Tabletop Gaming reviewer Richard Jansen-Parkes called Invisible Sun "a truly, genuinely, maddeningly unique RPG" and "a game that straddles the line between indulgence and inspiration". Aside from the "rather impressive price tag", Jansen-Parkes wondered how much of the enjoyment he experienced playing the game "comes from the actual quality, and how much it owes more to the grand presentation and price". In his opinion Invisible Sun is not suited for fans of simplicity in games, but "a truly incredible display of creativity" and fascinating to read.

Invisible Sun was nominated for ENNIE Awards in 2019 for "Best Art," "Best Production Values," "Best Setting," and "Product of the Year."

== Products ==
Title	Authors	Date	Pages	Formats	ISBN
Invisible Sun Black Cube	Monte Cook	2018	600+	Boxed set, PDF	
The core of the game, containing four rulebooks (The Key, The Way, The Gate, and The Path) and many other components, some of which are available separately
The Key	Monte Cook	2018	208	Hardcover, PDF	
The "player's handbook" for the game, with rules for creating and advancing characters; also contained in the Black Cube
Invisible Sun App	-	2018	-	Webapp	
Mobile application to allow playing side scenes and keep the game going away from the table
The Directed Campaign	Monte Cook	2018	-	Webpage, downloadable content, physical packages	
Adventure and background content distributed over a year, dependent on player choices, and including packages of props sent to participants. The Directed Campaign was only available for a limited time.
Book M	Monte Cook & Shanna Germain	2019	120	Slipcase with hardcover and cards, PDF	978-1-939979-83-4
A compendium of magic with new rules, character options and secrets, as well as cards with spells and artifacts
Secrets of Silent Streets	Monte Cook	2019	216	Hardcover, PDF	978-1-939979-88-9
Setting book detailing the city of Satyrine, centerpoint location of the game
Teratology	Bruce R. Cordell, Monte Cook & Shanna Germain	2019	192	Hardcover, PDF	978-1-939979-91-9
Collection of creatures, personalities and new locations
Enchiridion of the Path	Monte Cook	2019	128	Binder of removable pages, PDF	978-1950568048
A collection of handouts with setting information and adventure hooks on the Path of Suns, the game's eight worlds
The Nightside	Monte Cook	2019	192	Box with hardcover, cards, die, bag, PDF	978-1-939979-96-4
A collection of character options, magical practices and secrets themed for the dark side of the game setting
The Threshold	Monte Cook	2019	128	Hardcover, PDF	978-1-939979-98-8
Character options, secrets and magic as well as the Labyrinth, a special setting location, all geared towards powerful characters; rules combined with narration in a unique way
The Van Hauten Collection: Magical Praxis	Monte Cook	2020	88	PDF	
A glimmer collecting the various magical procedures beyond spells published in preceding products
The Wellspring	Monte Cook	2025	120	Slipcase with hardcover, cards and props, PDF	
Resource "focused on helping to launch Invisible Sun campaigns" and "help create the full immersion", according to Charles Ryan as "a response to new players who have found the ambitious game to be overwhelming".
