= No Thank You, Evil! =

Tabletop role-playing game

- Publishers: Monte Cook Games
- Publication: 2016

No Thank You, Evil! is a 2016 tabletop game published by Monte Cook Games.

== Contents ==
No Thank You, Evil! is a storytelling adventure game.

== Reception ==
No Thank You, Evil! won the 2016 Origins Award for Best Role-Playing Game.

No Thank You, Evil! won the 2016 Gold ENnie Award for Best Family Game.
