= Arsenal Street =

Arsenal Street may refer to:

- Arsenal Street, St. Louis, Missouri, U.S.
- Arsenal Street Bridge, connecting Arsenal Street in Watertown, Massachusetts to Western Avenue in Allston, Boston, Massachusetts, U.S.
- Arsenal Street, Hong Kong, the location of Hong Kong Police Headquarters
