= Arsenal Hill =

Arsenal Hill may refer to the following places:

- Dealul Spirii, Bucharest, Romania
- Arsenal Hill (Columbia, South Carolina), United States
