= Numenera =

2013 Science fantasy tabletop role-playing game

- 2013 cover by Kieran Yanner
- Designers: Monte Cook
- Publishers: Monte Cook Games
- Publication: 2013; 13 years ago
- Genres: Science fantasy
- Systems: Cypher System
- Website: numenera.com

Numenera is a science fantasy tabletop role-playing game set in the far distant future, written by Monte Cook, published in 2013.

== Game ==
=== Setting ===
Numenera Logo

Numenera is set on Earth approximately one billion years in the future. The setting is called "The Ninth World" due to the fact that eight civilizations have risen and fallen prior to the current era.

=== Character creation ===
Players fill in the blanks to the statement:

"I am a __________ __________ who _________s."

1. The first blank, the adjective in the sentence, is filled in by a character's "Descriptor", a way to describe the character's strongest characteristic.
2. The second blank, the noun of the sentence, is filled in by a character's "Type", which is a "Glaive" (a warrior type), a "Nano" (a technology adept type), or a "Jack" (as in jack-of-all-trades).
3. The third blank, the verb of the sentence, is filled in by a character's "Focus", or what the character is most known for or their special talent.

=== Technology ===
The name "Numenera" is a reference to the bits of technology left over from past civilizations. The word "numen" is a Latin root word meaning a "pervading divine presence" and "era" refers to the period (1 billion years in the future) in which this universe takes place. The world is utterly filled with "nanites" (the divine presence) that some beings in this universe can tap into and control. With a nod towards Clarke's Third Law, "any sufficiently advanced technology is indistinguishable from magic", the setting treats technology with much the same approach as magic in a fantasy setting. The native tech level is roughly medieval.

== Launch ==
Numenera was launched via a Kickstarter campaign and set a record for "most money raised for a tabletop role-playing game" at $517,255 by 4,658 backers, surpassing the previous record set by the Kickstarter for Traveller 5th edition. Originally intended just to fund the initial core rulebook, the campaign more than doubled its funding goal within the first 24 hours. "Stretch goals" that were announced as the level of funding grew increased the output of products, ending up producing an entire game line.

== Numenera Destiny and Discovery ==
This two volume replacement for the original rulebook was crowdfunded in 2017. This new iteration emphasized on exploration, discovery, and building. It also incorporated a few revisions from the Cypher rule system that had been released subsequent to the original Numenera release. Calling itself Numenera 2, it also used a Kickstarter campaign for initial funding, obtaining $845,258 from 4,185 backers.

Numenera: Discovery is a revision of the original core rulebook. The Jack character type was substantially revised to be more distinctive compared to Nanos and Glaives. Also added are player intrusions, a mechanism allowing players to alter the environment by spending an experience point. Legacy material from the original Numenera book, not included in the new edition, were made available for free as a PDF.

Numenera: Destiny is mostly new material offering three new character types: Arkus, Delve, and Wright, new descriptors and new foci. The book emphasizes crafting along with community protection and development with these character types taking lead positions in such an endeavor. A major section on crafting mechanisms and a major section on communities are provided. The manner of running a community game can be described as treating the community as an NPC in the game with stats that the player characters enhance. New monsters, NPCs, and settings are also offered in the Destiny core rulebook.

== Products ==
The core rulebook of Numenera has been translated into Italian, German, Spanish, French and Portuguese.

=== Numenera Core Rulebooks ===
Title	Authors	Date	Pages	Formats	ISBN
Numenera	Monte Cook	August 14, 2013	416	Print, Deluxe, PDF	978-1-939979-00-1
The original core rulebook for the game. Replaced by Numenera: Discovery and Destiny.
Numenera Player's Guide	Monte Cook	August 14, 2013	64	Print, PDF	978-1-939979-01-8
Book focused on the player characters; subset of content from the Corebook. Replaced by the 2018 Numenera Player's Guide.
Numenera: Discovery	Monte Cook, Bruce Cordell, & Sean K. Reynolds	October 17, 2018	416	PDF, Print	978-1-939979-78-0
The core rulebook for the game, revised
Numenera: Destiny	Monte Cook, Bruce Cordell, & Sean K. Reynolds	October 17, 2018	416	PDF, Print	978-1-939979-77-3
An auxiliary rulebook for the game
Numenera Player's Guide	Monte Cook, Bruce Cordell, & Sean K. Reynolds	October 31, 2018	96	Print, PDF	978-1-939979-76-6
Book focused on the player characters; subset of content from the Numenera: Discovery & Destiny core rulebooks.

=== Supplements ===
Title	Authors	Date	Pages	Formats	ISBN
In Strange Aeons: Lovecraftian Numenera	Monte Cook	October 2013	12	PDF	
Contains advice on incorporating Lovecraftian horror elements into Numenera campaigns and adventures. It provides two new descriptors, new creatures, and rules for sanity in the Cypher System.
Cypher Collection 1	Monte Cook & Bruce Cordell	December 2013	10	PDF	
Contains 50 unique cyphers. Included in the later supplement 'Technology Compendium: Sir Arthour’s Guide to the Numenera'.
Artifacts & Oddities Collection 1	Monte Cook & Bruce Cordell	December 2013	10	PDF	
Contains 30 new artifacts and 100 new oddities. Included in the later supplement 'Technology Compendium: Sir Arthour’s Guide to the Numenera'.
The Ninth World Bestiary	Monte Cook & Bruce Cordell	February 2014	160	Print, PDF	978-1-939979-09-4
A collection of 130 creatures and characters for Numenera.
Love and Sex in the Ninth World	Shanna Germain	February 2014	13	PDF	
A guide to integrating elements of love and sex into any Numenera story or adventure.
Injecting the Weird	Monte Cook	March 2014	22	PDF	
A discussion of the weird, as well as hundreds of ideas for the weird aspects of ancient places, communities, NPCs, creatures, wilderness locations, and items. Also contains a new descriptor and two new foci.
Numenera Character Options	Monte Cook	May 2014	96	Print, PDF	978-1-939979-14-8
A collection of more descriptors and foci.
Technology Compendium: Sir Arthour's Guide to the Numenera	Monte Cook	August 2014	160	Print, PDF	978-1-939979-20-9
A collection of Numenera cyphers, oddities and artifacts
When Worlds Collide: Converting Numenera and The Strange	Monte Cook & Bruce Cordell	August 2014	18	PDF	
Guide to converting material from The Strange campaign setting for Numenera.
Strange Creatures of the Ninth World	Monte Cook	November 2014	15	PDF	
Guide to converting creatures from The Strange campaign setting for Numenera. Includes alternative, Ninth-World-specific backgrounds for about 80 creatures from The Strange Bestiary.
Maps of the Ninth World	Monte Cook	December 2014	65	PDF	
Collection of high-resolution maps from the Numenera corebook with labelled and unlabelled versions of each.
The Ninth World Guidebook	Monte Cook & Shanna Germain	January 2015	256	Print, PDF	978-1-939979-24-7
A setting book about the Ninth World, its locations and denizens
Maps of the Ninth World 2	Monte Cook	June 2015	37	PDF	
Collection of high-resolution maps from The Ninth World Guidebook with labelled and unlabelled versions of each.
Into the Night	Monte Cook & Bruce Cordell	September 2015	160	Print, PDF	978-1-939979-40-7
Supplement for adventures in outer space. Contains new creatures, NPCs, cyphers, and artifacts.
The Nightcraft	Monte Cook	September 2015	10	PDF	
Detailed description of a space ship from the 'Into the Night' supplement.
Into the Deep	Monte Cook, Bruce Cordell & Shanna Germain	May 2016	160	Print, PDF	978-1-939979-45-2
Supplement for underwater adventures. Contains new playable races, creatures, NPCs, cyphers, and artifacts.
The Octopi of the Ninth World	Monte Cook	June 2016	12	PDF	
Detailed description of the octopi civilisation from the 'Into the Deep' supplement.
Torment: Tides of Numenera—The Explorer's Guide	Shanna Germain	August 2016	160	Print, PDF	978-1-939979-51-3
Adaptation of content from the 'Torment: Tides of Numenera' computer game.
Numenera Character Options 2	Monte Cook & Bruce Cordell	September 2016	96	Print, PDF	978-1-939979-55-1
A collection introducing two new character types as well as more descriptors and foci
Into the Outside	Bruce Cordell	February 2017	160	Print, PDF	978-1-939979-47-6
Supplement for adventures in alternate dimensions. Contains new locations and creatures.
In Alternate Dimensions	Bruce Cordell	February 2017	14	PDF	
Collection of GM intrusions and ideas for alternative dimensions.
Exploring Numenera: Strand	Bruce Cordell	February 2017	4	PDF	
Adaptation of content from the short film 'Numenera: Strand'.
The Ninth World Bestiary 2	Bruce Cordell	May 2017	192	Print, PDF	978-1-939979-64-3
A collection of 160 creatures for Numenera.
The Way of the Dinosaur: Converting Predation for Numenera and The Strange	Bruce Cordell	June 2017	7	PDF	
Guide to converting content from the Predation campaign setting for Numenera.
Jade Colossus: Ruins of the Prior Worlds	Bruce Cordell	August 2017	144	Print, PDF	978-1-939979-68-1
Campaign guide for the Jade Colossus, a gigantic ruin. Includes the Numenera Ruin Mapping Engine and new character options and creatures.
Building Tomorrow	Bruce Cordell & Sean K. Reynolds	October 2017	192	Print, PDF	978-1-939979-84-1
Expansion of rules and material from Numenera Destiny including salvaging and crafting, example communities, and followers.
Numenera Priests of the Aeons	Sean K. Reynolds	2019	191	Print, PDF	978-1-939979-89-6
Details on the Aeon Priesthood with new character options.
The Ninth World Bestiary 3	Bruce Cordell & Sean K. Reynolds	May 2019	192	Print, PDF	978-1-939979-92-6
A collection of 150 creatures and characters for Numenera.
Voices of the Datasphere	Bruce Cordell & Sean K. Reynolds	June 2020	160	Print, PDF	978-1-950568-08-6
Supplement for adventures in the virtual metaspace known as the datasphere. Contains 2 adventures.
Liminal Shore	Bruce Cordell & Sean K. Reynolds	September 2020	160	Print, PDF	978-1-950568-12-3
A new setting for Numenera with new player races, cyphers, artifacts, and creatures. Contains 2 adventures.
Edge of the Sun	Bruce Cordell	February 2021	160	Print, PDF	978-1-950568-15-4
Supplement for adventures on the surface of the sun with new cyphers, artifacts, and creatures. Contains 2 adventures.
Break the Horizon	Bruce Cordell	March 2022	144	Print, PDF	978-1-950568-22-2
Supplement focused on travel. Contains 2 adventures.
The Glimmering Valley	Monte Cook	November 2023	128	Print, PDF	978-1-950568-46-8
Campaign setting and adventure for the Glittering Valley, a smaller area designed to introduce players to the Ninth World.

=== Adventures and Glimmers ===
Glimmers are short, PDF-only publications. There are also some adventure collections that have appeared in print:

Title	Authors	Date	Pages	Formats	ISBN
The Devil's Spine	Monte Cook	October 2013	96	PDF, print	9781939979025
Three 32 page adventures, "The Devil's Spine", "The Mechanized Tomb", "The Other Side of the Maelstrom"
The Nightmare Switch	Monte Cook	August 14, 2013	32	PDF	
A Kickstarter exclusive adventure
Vortex	Monte Cook	September 4, 2013	18	PDF	
The Numenera launch adventure at Gen Con 2013. 18-page adventure, plus 6 double-sided pre-generated characters.
Beyond All Worlds	Robert J. Schwalb	May 2014	22	PDF	
Short 22-page adventure
Into the Violet Vale	Monte Cook	September 2014	25	PDF	
Numenera adventure at Gen Con 2014. 12-page adventure, plus 6 double-sided pre-generated characters.
Weird Discoveries: Ten Instant Adventures for Numenera	Monte Cook	April 2015	96	PDF, print	
Ten fully developed adventures that can be run with little preparation time.
The Hideous Game	Monte Cook	September 2015	22	PDF	
Instant adventure run at Gen Con 2015. 10-page adventure, plus 6 pre-generated characters.
Skein of the Blackbone Bride	Shanna Germain	November 2016	27	PDF	
Adventure run at Gen Con 2016. 14-page adventure, plus 6 double-sided pre-generated characters.
The Thief, the Clave, and the Ultimatum	Bruce R. Cordell	December 2016	11	PDF	
Instant adventure
The Spire of Hunting Sound	Dennis Detwiller	September 2017	47	PDF	
Adventure run at 2017 Free RPG Day. 19-page adventure and 13-page quickstart rules, plus 5 double-sided pre-generated characters and a 5-page mini-bestiary. This was available in print on the Free RPG day at limited stores.
Escape from the Jade Colossus	Bruce R. Cordell	September 2017	30	PDF	
Adventure run at GenCon 2017. 17-page adventure, plus 6 double-sided pre-generated characters.
Shadewalker	Sean K. Reynolds	December 2017	22	PDF	
Short 10-page adventure, plus 6 pre-generated characters.
Ashes of the Sea	Sean K. Reynolds	July 2018	47	PDF	
Numenera 2018 Free RPG Day adventure. 15-page adventure and 13-page quickstart rules, plus 6 double-sided pre-generated characters and a 4-page mini-bestiary. This was available in print on the Free RPG day at limited stores.
Slaves of the Machine God	Bruce Cordell	January 2019	144	PDF, print	978-1-939979-86-5
Campaign book. Two story arcs, each containing eight separate adventures.
Forgetting Doomsday	Shanna Germain	May 2019	26	PDF	
Adventure run at GenCon 2018. 14-page adventure, plus 6 double-sided pregenerated characters.
Explorer's Keys: Ten Instant Adventures for Numenera	Bruce R. Cordell & Sean K. Reynolds	August 2019	96	PDF, Print	978-1-939979-94-0
Ten fully developed adventures that can be run with little preparation time.
Where the Machines Wait	Bruce R. Cordell	May 2021	96	PDF, print	
Adventure using OGL 5E-compatible rules. Includes new creatures, items, and a playable species. Also contains conversion notes for Numenera and the Cypher System.
Vertices	Sean K. Reynolds	July 2021	96	PDF, print	
Eight adventures in prior-world ruins. Includes a random settlement generator.
Shards of the Looking Glass	Charles M. Ryan	February 2023	28	PDF	
Adventure run at Gen Con and Gamehole Con 2022. 16-page adventure, plus 6 double-sided pregenerated characters.

=== Game aids ===
Title	Date	Pages	Formats
Numenera Cypher Card Deck	July 2013	120 cards	Print, PDF
Cards representing cyphers available in game
Numenera GM Screen	August 2013	N/A	Print, PDF
Four-panel, landscape format vinyl GM's screen
Numenera Creature Card Deck	January 2014	100 cards	Print, PDF
Cards representing Numenera creatures
Numenera Cypher Card Deck 2	September 2014	120 cards	Print, PDF
Cards representing cyphers available in game
Numenera Weird Deck	August 2015	100 cards	Print, PDF
Cards containing ideas of weird elements to add to the game.
Numenera Intrusion Deck	August 2015	100 cards	Print, PDF
Cards containing GM Intrusions.
Numenera Artifact Deck	May 2016	100 cards	Print, PDF
Cards representing artifacts available in game
Numenera Creature Deck 2	May 2017	99 cards	Print, PDF
Cards representing Numenera creatures from The Ninth World Bestiary 2, Into the Night, Into the Deep, and Into the Outside.
Numenera Cypher and Creature Deck Expansion	May 2017	60 cards	Print, PDF
30 additional creature cards, and 30 additional cypher effect cards
Ruin Deck	January 2019	100 cards	Print, PDF
Each card contains prompts to create a room, obstacle, location, or encounter.
Shin Set	January 2019	50 metal tokens	
Metal coins to represent Numenera currency (shins).
Numenera Creature Deck 3	August 2019	99 cards	Print, PDF
Cards representing Numenera creatures from The Ninth World Bestiary 3.
Salvage Deck	September 2019	100 cards	Print, PDF
Each card contains random salvage results and suggested GM intrusions.
Numenera XP Card Deck	March 2020	60 cards	Print, PDF
Cards representing a character's XP points
Numenera Playmat	March 2020	Fabric playmat (24″ x 32″)	
Illustrated playmat containing rules reference.
Numenera Character Portfolios and Character Sheets	June 2020	104 (print)	Print, PDF
Blank character sheets and a character generation walkthrough.
Numenera Character and Creature Standups	September 2020	22	Print, PDF
Paper miniatures of characters and creatures.

=== Fiction ===
Title	Authors	Date	Pages	Formats	ISBN
The Amber Monolith	Monte Cook	August 2012	18	PDF	
Introductory short story to the Numenera setting; included within the Corebook.
Tales from the Ninth World	Monte Cook	June 2013	79	PDF, ePUB, MOBI	
Collection of short stories set in the Numenera setting.
More Tales from the Ninth World	Monte Cook & Shanna Germain	August 2015	57	PDF, ePUB, MOBI	
Collection of short stories set in the Numenera setting.
Tales Beyond the Ninth World	Monte Cook, Bruce Cordell & Shanna Germain	August 2015	59	PDF, ePUB, MOBI	
Collection of short stories set in the Numenera setting.
The Poison Eater	Shanna Germain	January 2017	320	PDF, ePUB, MOBI, Print	978-0-857666-35-2
The first full-length novel set in the Numenera setting.
The Night Clave	Monte Cook & Shanna Germain	November 2017	368	PDF, ePUB, MOBI, Print	978-0-857667-20-5
The second full-length novel set in the Numenera setting.
Discover Your Destiny	Monte Cook & Shanna Germain	July 2018	24	PDF, ePUB, MOBI	
Meta-narrative about creating characters and playing in the world of Numenera.
Tomorrow's Bones	Shanna Germain	December 2019	240	PDF, ePUB, MOBI, Print	
The third full-length novel set in the Numenera setting.
The Truth of Names	Monte Cook	February 2022	51	PDF, ePUB, MOBI	
Novella set in the Numenera setting.

=== Related products ===
There have been several announced tie-ins to the brand:

- Thunderstone Advance: Numenera by AEG, an expansion to the Thunderstone deck-building card game, set in the world of Numenera.
- Torment: Tides of Numenera by inXile, a spiritual successor to Planescape: Torment by Interplay. This computer game was also launched by Kickstarter and was itself a record setter for Kickstarter, being the fastest to $1 million up to that time.
- Reaper Miniatures released a boxed set of 28-mm scale miniature figures for Numenera.

== Reception ==
In a review of Numenera in Black Gate, John ONeill said "The book is splendidly designed and a pleasure to read. It's also packed with gorgeous artwork. This is exactly the kind of gamebook that makes you ache to pick up your dice and start playing."

=== Awards ===
Numenera received the 2014 Origins Award for "Best New Roleplaying Game".
