= Mike Mearls =

American game designer

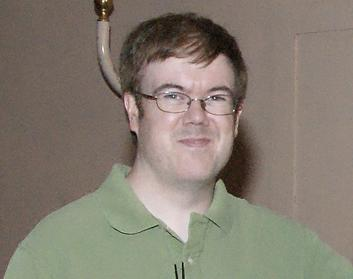
- Mearls at the 2012 Ennies
- Education: Dartmouth College
- Occupations: Writer, game designer
- Children: 1
- Writing career
- Genre: Role-playing games

Michael Mearls is an American writer and designer of fantasy role-playing games (RPGs) and related fiction.

Mearls worked for Wizards of the Coast from 2005 to 2023, holding various positions. He was the senior manager for the Dungeons & Dragons research and design team and then later became the franchise's Creative Director. He co-led design for the 5th edition of the game. He also worked on the Castle Ravenloft board game, and various compendium books for 3rd, 4th, and 5th editions Dungeons & Dragons. In 2024, he became the Executive Producer of role-playing games at Chaosium. Then in 2025, he left to work at Asmodee.

== Education ==
Mearls is an alumnus of Dartmouth College. While at Dartmouth he was a member of Sigma Nu fraternity, and became known for a satiric letter to the campus paper.

== Career ==
Mearls wrote the adventure To Stand on Hallowed Ground/Swords Against Deception (2001) for Fiery Dragon Productions, and the last product from Hogshead Publishing, a Warhammer adventure titled Fear the Worst (2002) that Hogshead released for free on the internet. He also designed the game Iron Heroes (2005) for Malhavoc Press.

In June 2005, Mearls was hired as a designer by Wizards of the Coast based on his work on third-party d20 products. Along with Andy Collins, David Noonan, and Jesse Decker, Mearls was part of the fourth edition Dungeons & Dragons "Flywheel" design team led by Rob Heinsoo, and this team was responsible for the final concept work from May 2006 to September 2006, before the first books for the edition were written and playtested. Between the fourth edition design phases titled "Orcus I" and "Orcus II", Mearls added the encounter-power mechanics of fourth edition into Tome of Battle: The Book of Nine Swords (2006), which was in process during development of the new edition. Heinsoo was laid off in 2009, so Mearls was made the new lead designer of Dungeons & Dragons. Collins left Wizards in May 2010, and Mearls was promoted to Group Manager of the Dungeons & Dragons R&D team. Mearls oversaw the launch of 4th Edition's Essentials line; Shannon Appelcline, author of Designers & Dragons, commented that the new line was "primarily the brain child of Mike Mearls". Mearls also co-designed the Castle Ravenloft Board Game (2010) with Bill Slavicsek.

In 2014, Mearls was a senior manager for Dungeons & Dragons research and development. Mearls was, together with Jeremy Crawford, Co-Lead Designer for the Fifth Edition of Dungeons & Dragons. By 2018, Mearls had become the franchise's Creative Director. He left the Wizards of the Coast tabletop RPG team in 2019 and was replaced by Ray Winninger as the Executive Producer in charge of the Dungeons & Dragons studio in 2020. Mearls went on to join the Exploratory and Vision design teams for Magic: The Gathering. He received "special thanks" in the credits for Baldur's Gate 3 (2023); in a 2019 interview, Mearls described his role as "story and system support". Mearls confirmed on Bluesky that he was laid off in December 2023.

In May 2024, Chaosium announced that Mearls was their new Executive Producer of role-playing games. In June 2025, it was announced while Mearls had left Chaosium, he would still continue to work on some Chaosium projects such as the new edition of RuneQuest. Mearls left to work at Asmodee.

== Writing credits ==
- Iron Heroes role playing game.
- "The Siege of Durgham's Folly," from Necromancer Games
- Dungeons & Dragons 4th Edition Player's Handbook 2
- Dungeons & Dragons 4th Edition Monster Manual 3
- Dungeons & Dragons 4th Edition Keep on the Shadowfell, Adventure Book
- Playtest: New Hybrid and Multiclass Options, Dragon magazine #400
- Dragon magazine #360
