= Arsenal Cider House =

Cider manufacturer in Pittsburgh

Coordinates: 40.46508°N 79.96085°W

Arsenal Cider House and Wine Cellar
- Location: 300 39th Street, Lawrenceville, Pittsburgh, Pennsylvania
- Key people: Bill and Michelle Larkin
- Known for: Daily Rations (cider)

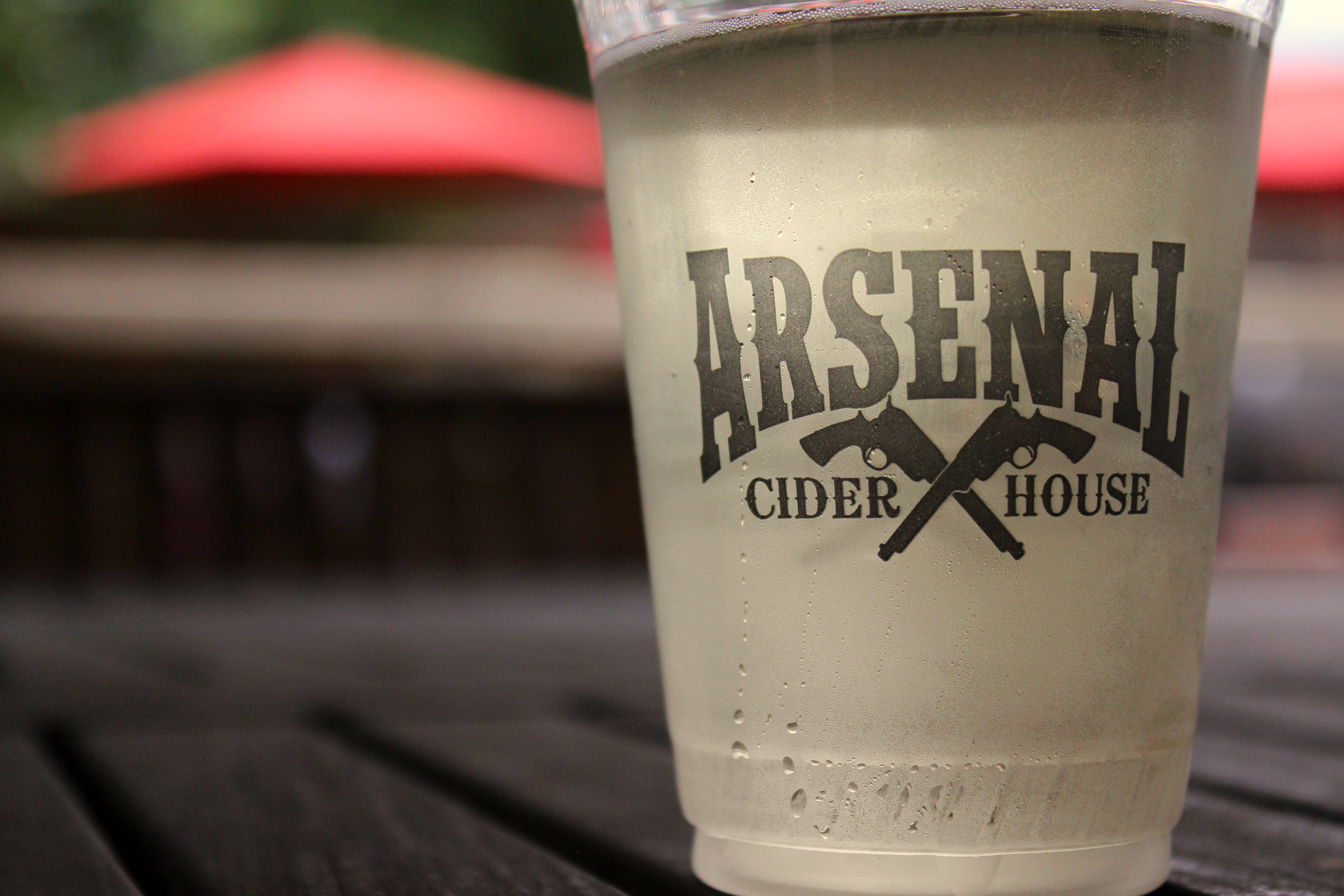

Arsenal Cider House and Wine Cellar is a small-batch cider manufacturer located in the Lawrenceville neighborhood of Pittsburgh.

It is located adjacent to, and named after, the historic Allegheny Arsenal.

It was cited by a Canadian newspaper as an example of something that makes Pittsburgh "chic".
