= The Witchfire Trilogy Book One: The Longest Night =

- Publisher: Privateer Press
- Publication date: 2001

The Witchfire Trilogy Book One: The Longest Night is a 2001 role-playing game adventure published by Privateer Press.

== Plot summary ==
The Witchfire Trilogy Book One: The Longest Night is an adventure in which a campaign started in the Iron Kingdoms setting.

== Publication history ==
Shannon Appelcline noted that "Privateer's first publications were a trilogy of adventures: The Longest Night (2001), Shadow of the Exile (2001), and The Legion of the Lost (2001) - which were collectively known as The Witchfire Trilogy. They were supplemented by the PDF-only adventure Fool's Errand (2001), which could be run between the first two books. Together these adventures helped Privateer Press to establish itself, based on two core strengths."

== Reception ==
- The Longest Night won at the 2001 ENnie Awards for Best Art (Interior), and Best Art (Cover).

== Reviews ==
- Pyramid
- Backstab
- Asgard (Issue 1 - Jul 2001)
- Campaign Magazine (Issue 2 - Mar/Apr 2002)
