= Ptolus =

Fantasy role-playing game campaign setting

Cover art by Todd Lockwood

Ptolus, subtitled "Monte Cook's City by the Spire", is a fantasy role-playing game campaign setting created by Monte Cook and published by his Malhavoc Press in 2006 that details a single city and the dungeons that lie beneath it. Ptolus uses the rules of the third edition of Dungeons & Dragons — the d20 System — under the terms of Wizards of the Coast's Open Game License. At 672 pages, it was the largest D&D supplement that had been published up to that time.

== Setting ==
Ptolus is a coastal city at the edge of the Tarsis empire that is set on the water planet Praemal, which is itself currently experiencing an ice age. The city lies in the shadow of a mysterious and impossibly tall spire. The book only provides information about the city and what lies beneath it (sewers, dungeons and an ancient dwarven city), and gives few details of the surrounding lands, the rest of the Tarsis empire or the planet Praemal, leaving the gamemaster to fill in these blanks if needed or desired.

The first chapter, "A Player's Guide to Ptolus", gives general details of the city that inhabitants would be reasonably expected to know: an overview of city neighborhoods, major religions, and organizations that operate in the city. The chapter also includes details of typical character races; in addition to the usual races found in D&D 3, characters can be shoal elves (seafaring elves), harrow elves (deformed and debased, considered second-class citizens), cherubim elves (winged elves), and litorians (humanoid lions).

In another change from D&D 3, gunpowder weapons and clockwork creatures are commonplace.

The rest of the book is for the gamemaster. Each chapter, organized like a tour book, provides information about each area of the city, with details of notable characters, rumors, and adventure hooks. As critic Gustavo Brauner noted, "each district of the city is treated like a separate kingdom, with places, people, fashion and a different flavor. Furthermore, Ptolus also has religions, guilds, secret societies, noble families, intrigue, monsters, dungeons and races of its own." A large separate map of the overall city leads to smaller maps printed in the book of individual neighborhoods that highlight important locations.

Information includes the cost of renting or buying property as well as the cost of maintaining a certain level of lifestyle. Several chapters are devoted to what lies beneath the city, namely a network of sewers, natural caves, monster lairs and Dwarvenhearth, a long-abandoned dwarven city.

Ptolus also provides a series of linked adventures that inevitably lead to a confrontation with the evil entity that inhabits the mysterious spire.

The final three chapters provide the gamemaster with a bestiary, new spells, and new prestige classes.

In addition to the city map and 24 loose playing aids, the book comes with a CD-ROM that contains another adventure, The Night of Dissolution, as well as two other Malhavoc publications that can be used in the Ptolus setting, The Banewarrens and Chaositech.

== Publication history ==
In the late 1990s, while Monte Cook worked at Wizards of the Coast (WotC), he and several other members of the staff, including Andy Collins, Bruce R. Cordell, and Sean K. Reynolds played a home campaign of Advanced Dungeons & Dragons using the 2nd edition set of rules. Cook was the gamemaster, and developed a city setting he called "Ptolus". When WotC began to develop a new set of rules that would eventually become the 3rd edition of D&D, Cook's Ptolus setting became the playtest ground for new rule proposals.

After D&D 3 was published in 2000 and WotC allowed third party content under the terms of the Open Game License, Cook founded Malhavoc Press in 2001 in order to publish some of his own material. Not wanting to oversee the actual details of publication, Cook used White Wolf Publishing's "Sword & Sorcery" imprint to release his third-party D&D material. Using this publication stream, Cook produced several books, the last and largest being Ptolus: City of the Spire, featuring cover art by Todd Lockwood, interior illustrations by Toren Atkinson, Kevin Crossley, Pawel Dobosz, Talon Cole Dunning, Jason Engle, Michael Komarck, Brian J. LeBlanc, Eric M. Lofgren, Howard Lyon, Michael Phillippi, Alan Pollack, Randall K. Post, Peter Schlough, JD Sparks, Arnie Swekel, Sam Wood, Kieran J. Yanner, and Maciej Zagórski, and cartography by Edward Bourelle. At 672 pages, Ptolus, was the largest and most expensive D&D book published that had been published. The first 1000 copies were signed by Cook.

In February 2020, Monte Cook Games launched crowd funding to successfully bring back Ptolus for 5th Edition D&D and Cypher System.

== Reception ==
In Issue 130 of Inquest Gamer, Brent Fishbaugh noted "At $119.99 and 672 pages, Ptolus: Monte Cook's City by the Spire for d20 fantasy promises to be everything you could ever want in a roleplaying setting." Fishbaugh thought one of the best things was that "this is a look inside the heads of D&D designers, and that alone is worth the price of admission; this is the original campaign setting creators used to playtest when constructing the Third Edition rules." Fishbaugh also pointed out all of the extra materials provided in addition to the massive book. Fishbaugh concluded, "We've yet to see more bang for the gamer buck—and this an explosion."

In an article in the Brazilian RPG magazine Coleção Dragon Slayer titled "Ptolus is the Largest, Can It also be the Best?", Gustavo Brauner called this "everything that GMs and players need to have fun for hours, or even years. Ptolus is the missing book for the 3.0 and 3.5 editions of D&D — a work full of background and role-play, with excellent rules support." Brauner concluded, "Ptolus is the perfect marriage between rules and setting, with a rich and innovative scenario, both in its form and content."

In the same magazine several issues later, Paladino questioned why some publishers were creating entire campaign worlds, asking "do you really need a whole world? Do you need to cross valleys and plains to kill goblins, when one gang of them have been terrifying your neighborhood streets? Do you need to climb mountains after a dragon, when its lair could be somewhere under your city district? Do you need to travel across the planes to hunt demons, when the local slave guild is actually headed by one of them? ... Monte Cook, the hottest RPG author of the moment, shows that this is not the case ... [preferring] to build a single city. But what a city!" Paladino called the city of Ptolus "the richest and most complex city ever described for Dungeons & Dragons... Such is the detail, that you soon get the feeling of getting to know a real location." Paladino concluded, "All the adventure you need, all the fantastic journeys and discoveries, fit right into one galaxy. Or city."

In his 2014 book Designers & Dragons, game historian Shannon Appelcline wrote "Malhavoc's most impressive Sword & Sorcery book was, without a doubt, Ptolus: City by the Spire (2006), a massive 672-page RPG book that fully detailed a city and included adventures to bring characters all the way from level 1 to 20. It was and remains one of the biggest and most impressive roleplaying volumes in existence."

== Awards ==
At the 2007 ENnie Awards, Ptolus won four gold medals:

- Best Cartography
- Best Production Values
- Best Setting
- Best Product

Ptolus was also awarded an Honorable Mention in the category "Best d20/d20 OGL Product".
