= Aleksei Kozlov (musician) =

Russian composer and saxophonist (1935–2026)

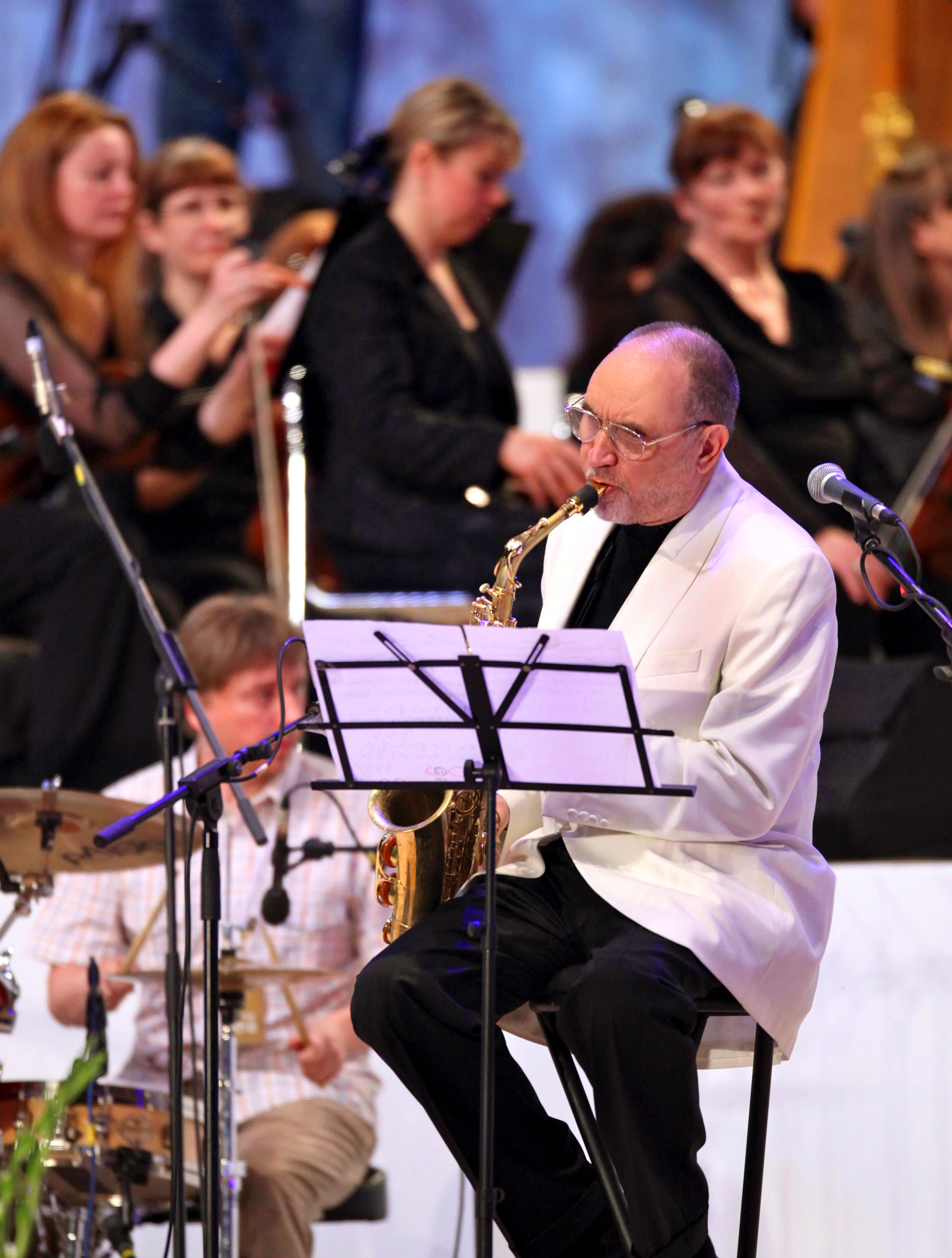
Kozlov in 2010

Alexei Semenovich Kozlov (Note: sometimes given as Aleksey Kozlov or, in his own transliteration, as Alexey Kozlov) (Russian: Алексей Семёнович Козлов; 13 October 1935 – 25 September 2026) was a Russian saxophonist. He was part of the first group of prominent Soviet-era Russian jazz musicians which emerged during the 1960s. Kozlov founded the band Arsenal, which is considered the preeminent Jazz-rock fusion ensemble in Russia.

== Background ==
Alexei Semenovich Kozlov was born on 13 October 1935. His father taught at the Moscow Pedagogical Institute named after V.I. Lenin. His mother, Ekaterina Tolchenova, was a chorus conductor and music theory teacher. His grandfather Ivan Tolchenov sang on the opera stage and in church choirs.

Kozlov was married to Lyalya Absalyamova, a teacher of English. He had a son, Sergey, from his first marriage. Kozlov died on 25 September 2026, at the age of 90.

== Awards ==
- 2003 – People's Artist of Russia.
