= Sue Weinlein Cook =

American game designer

Sue Weinlein
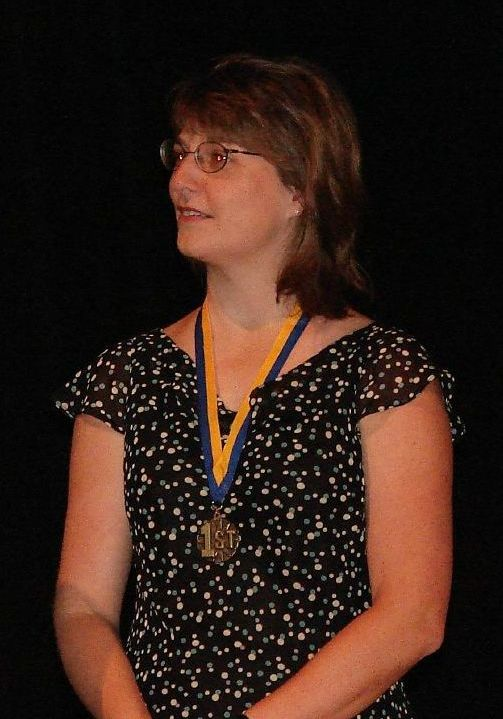
- Weinlein in August 2007 at the Gen Con Ennies awards show
- Born: Sue Weinlein; Green Bay, Wisconsin, U.S.
- Occupation: Editor, game designer
- Genre: Role-playing games, fantasy
- Spouse: Monte Cook (divorced)

Sue Weinlein is an American game designer and editor who has worked on a number of products for the Dungeons & Dragons fantasy role-playing game from TSR, and for Monte Cook's Malhavoc Press.

== Biography ==
Sue Weinlein was born in Green Bay, Wisconsin, and grew up in the Milwaukee area. Her first exposure to the Dungeons & Dragons game was in junior high: "I'm embarrassed to admit this... I really didn't get it at first. I just couldn't make the transition from board games to roleplaying games." After living in Tennessee for a few years, she returned to Milwaukee and attended Marquette University, earning degrees in Journalism and Spanish.

While in college, Weinlein made her first contact with someone from TSR. "I was at a science fiction convention where I attended a panel on writing and editing books in a shared world series. James Lowder, then an editor with the TSR book department, was on it. I talked with him afterward about his job, and he invited me to tour the TSR offices in Lake Geneva." Eighteen months after taking that tour, Weinlein applied for a position at TSR as an editorial assistant, and was hired in 1992. In addition to being the book department's editorial assistant, she also worked as a game editor and designer.

Sue Weinlein became the assistant creative director for the Dragonlance line, and brand manager for the Dragonlance: Fifth Age and Marvel Super Heroes Adventure Game lines. Weinlein helped design the SAGA System game rules, laying the foundation for the Fifth Age of Krynn: "I am extremely pleased to have been part of the Dragonlance team. Margaret Weis and Tracy Hickman were a pleasure to work with". Weinlein was also involved with the production of the Dragonlance Fifteenth Anniversary Edition as one of her last projects in the Dragonlance line. She was also responsible for the invention of the web enhancement concept, where bonus content would be put online to accompany a roleplaying book.

In October 1998, Weinlein moved to the Wizards of the Coast Periodicals division and became the managing editor of Amazing Stories. Of the move, she says "there are very few jobs that could have taken me away from Dragonlance, and this was one of them. It's an honor working on a publication with the history and reputation of Amazing Stories."

== Works ==
Sue Weinlein has done editing work on many Dungeons & Dragons and other TSR and Wizards of the Coast game products from 1993 to 2002. She did some design work for the Dragonlance Fifth Age set.

In 2001, she began doing production and editing work for Malhavoc Press. She edited the 2004 short story collection Children of the Rune.

== Personal life ==
Weinlein was married to fellow game designer Monte Cook.
