= Arsenal (Perpetrated Press) =

Arsenal is a 2002 supplement for d20 System role-playing games published by Perpetrated Press.

== Contents ==
Arsenal is a supplement in which a tech‑magic armory packs hundreds of spell‑powered guns, explosives, and armored wonders to outfit characters with relics of devastating power.

== Reviews ==
- Pyramid
- Fictional Reality (Issue 10 - Dec 2002)
- Legions Realm Monthly (Issue 4 - Dec 2002)
