= Arcana Unearthed =

Tabletop role-playing game

Arcana Unearthed (full title Monte Cook's Arcana Unearthed), first published in 2003, is a role-playing game created by Monte Cook and based on the d20 System developed for Dungeons & Dragons 3rd edition. The game is notable for its divergences from Dungeons & Dragons: the absence of elves and dwarves, the absence of alignment, and its more flexible spellcasting mechanics. The game was later revised and updated in 2005 as Arcana Evolved.

== Setting and Themes ==
The campaign setting for Arcana Unearthed is The Diamond Throne, a land ruled by giants. The setting includes many elements of a traditional fantasy setting, along with a focus on ritual and ceremony, runes, and the magical properties of crystals.

Two of the most prominent themes of the game are ritual and character choices. Two examples are metamorphosis, in which faen become tiny, winged sprites, and Chi-Julud, in which the wise giants temporarily lose their wisdom to become stronger and more warlike. Monte Cook emphasized that players should avoid 'archetypes,' (such as stereotypes of bookish wizards and greedy, untrustworthy thieves) and design their characters more creatively.

== Mechanics ==
Arcana Unearthed was advertised as a "variant player's handbook" with alternative d20 System rules. The 256-page hardcover core rulebook bears many similarities to the Player's Handbook of 3rd Edition Dungeons & Dragons, on which Cook worked a few years prior. While it is based on the d20 system, due to its rules for character advancement, Arcana Unearthed is not an official d20 System product. It uses the Open Gaming License.

== Title confusion ==
Arcana Unearthed is not to be confused with Unearthed Arcana, the title of two books published in 1985 and 2004 that provided additional material for use in the then-current version of Dungeons & Dragons. The name Arcana Unearthed was chosen partially as a homage to the earlier of these two books. The announcement of the 2004 version came as an unpleasant surprise to Cook and some of his fans, who believed that they had an understanding with Wizards of the Coast that this title would not be re-used in the near future.

== Reception ==
Arcana Unearthed won the 2004 Gold ENNIE Award for Best Game, and the Silver for Best Art (Cover).

The cover, by artist Mark Zug, won the Chesley Award for Best Gaming-Related Illustration in 2005.

== Reviews ==
- Black Gate #7
- Backstab #46
- Coleção Dragão Brasil

== Arcana Evolved ==
Arcana Evolved is an updated "director's cut" of Arcana Unearthed released in 2005. Arcana Evolved is 432 pages in full color. It adds the contents of two previously separate books, The Diamond Throne and the Player's Companion, to the original variant player's handbook, along with new material including a new class and race, many new feats and spells, and rules for higher level characters than were possible in the original book. On the less mechanical side, it also advances the time line of the Diamond Throne campaign setting by several years - featuring the return of dragons to the lands of the Diamond Throne, reviving an ancient rivalry with the ruling giants.

Arcana Evolved won the 2005 Gold ENNIE Award for "Best Interior Art".

== Additional books ==
Malhavoc Press expanded the Arcana Unearthed universe with a series of books, including the rulebooks The Diamond Throne, Legacy of Dragons, Grimoire II, and Mystic Secrets, and the short story collection Children of the Rune. Some other publishers, including Blue Devil Games, also supported the Arcana Unearthed line. Since the release of Arcana Evolved, Malhavoc released a number of supporting books specific to the new edition, such as the Spell Treasury, Transcendence and Ruins of Intrigue.

Sue Weinlein Cook edited the 2004 short story collection Children of the Rune.
