= Monte Cook =

American writer and game designer

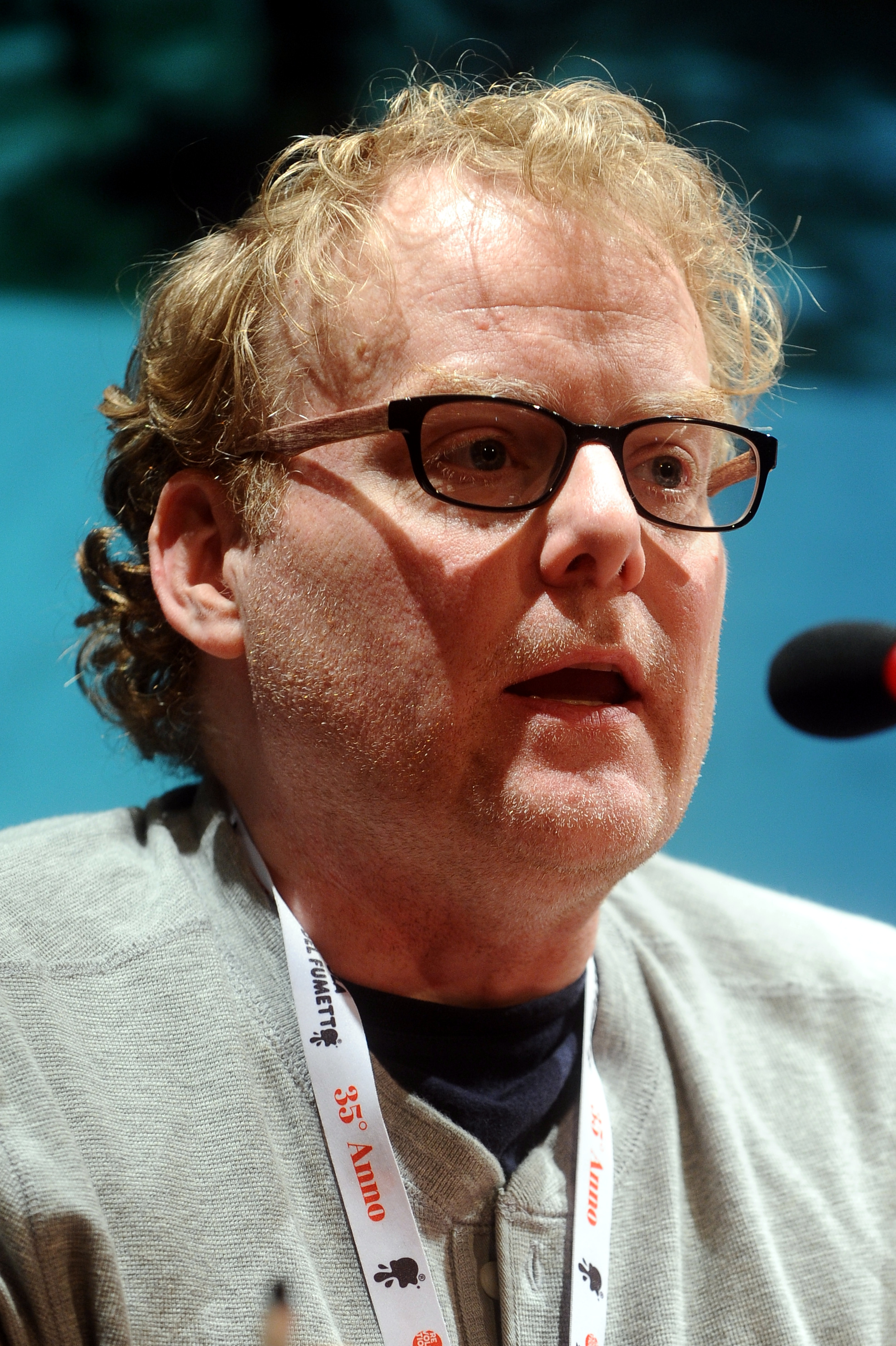
- Cook at Lucca Comics & Games 2014
- Born: January 29, 1968 (age 58); Watertown, South Dakota, U.S.
- Occupations: Writer, game designer
- Spouse: Sue Weinlein
- Writing career
- Genres: Role-playing games, fantasy

Monte Cook (born January 29, 1968) is an American professional tabletop role-playing game designer and writer, best known for his work on Dungeons & Dragons.

== Role-playing industry career ==
=== Early years ===
Cook has been a professional game designer since 1988, working primarily on role-playing games. Much of his early work was for Iron Crown Enterprises as an editor and writer for the Rolemaster and Champions lines. Cook was at one point the editor in charge of both the "Campaign Classics" line of books for the Hero System and the Rolemaster line. Cook worked for Iron Crown Enterprises for four years; two as a freelancer and two as a full-time designer. During this period, Cook wrote the multi-genre setting Dark Space (1990), which was a blend of fantasy, science-fiction, and horror. Cook became the line editor for Hero System, replacing Rob Bell, who left ICE in 1990. Cook himself left ICE in the early 1990s.

=== TSR ===
Cook began working for TSR in 1992 as a freelancer: "writing a whole slew of stuff for the old Marvel game that never came out because the game got canceled". In 1994 Cook came to work at TSR as a game designer. Cook designed Dungeons & Dragons modules such as Labyrinth of Madness (1995) and A Paladin in Hell (1998), and dozens of supplements to the Planescape line including The Planewalker's Handbook (1996) and Dead Gods (1998). Cook also designed the conspiracy game Dark•Matter in 1999.

=== Wizards of the Coast ===
After TSR was purchased by Wizards of the Coast, Cook became a senior designer, and was part of the team working on the D&D game's third edition. Cook, Jonathan Tweet, and Skip Williams all contributed to the 3rd edition Players Handbook, Dungeon Master's Guide, and Monster Manual, and then each designer wrote one of the books based on those contributions. Cook was proud of the work he did on the new Dungeon Master's Guide, especially after Gary Gygax gave his team feedback on the book: "He said that the material in the new DMG would help him become a better DM... That was really cool–and satisfying in a 'completion of the circle' sort of way." In 2000, Cook said of his involvement with Wizards of the Coast and Dungeons & Dragons: "It's a great time to be working here... because every product is big, important, and innovative." Cook also worked on Return to the Temple of Elemental Evil, and the d20 Call of Cthulhu (February 2002).

=== d20 licensed works and Malhavoc Press ===
Cook left Wizards of the Coast in 2001. Cook wrote the adventure Beyond the Veil (2001), one of the later releases in the "Penumbra" line of d20 System books from Atlas Games. Cook formed the new company Malhavoc Press in 2001 to work with the Sword and Sorcery Studios imprint of White Wolf, starting with the d20 The Book of Eldritch Might (2001) as his first product. The Book of Eldritch Might was the first commercial book sold exclusively as a PDF to be published by a print company. It was an immediate success and has been credited with demonstrating the viability of PDF publishing within the role-playing industry. This and other early Malhavoc products were initially released only in electronic format, though print versions of most of them have since been released by White Wolf, Inc. Malhavoc Press worked with Fiery Dragon Productions after Fiery Dragon ended their arrangement with Sword & Sorcery in 2002, and the majority of the licensed work from Fiery Dragon was through their arrangement with Malhavoc. Cook's work under the Malhavoc banner has included Arcana Unearthed: A Variant Players Handbook. Cook set the d20 rulebook Arcana Unearthed in his giant-dominated world of "The Diamond Throne".

He caused controversy in mid-2004 by exclusively selling his electronic d20 material with the DriveThruRPG.com store, which then used only a proprietary digital rights management-encrypted PDF system. He eventually succumbed to pressure from his customers to sell his products in standard-PDF form, and DriveThruRPG has more recently done the same.

In August 2006, Malhavoc released Ptolus, a campaign setting based on Monte Cook's home game that was used as the playtest campaign for the third edition D&D designers.

Shortly after the release of Ptolus, which Cook has often described as the culmination of his original ambitions for Malhavoc, he announced that he would be focusing on writing fiction and other unspecified forms of creative work, rather than role-playing games, for the foreseeable future. White Wolf and Goodman Games announced his final RPG books. Monte Cook's World of Darkness, his own take on White Wolf's modern horror setting, was released at Gen Con 2007. From Goodman Games is Dungeon Crawl Classics: #50, Vault of the Iron Overlord, which was also targeted for the same Gen Con release.

However, due to demand by fans reading his LiveJournal, and posting their desires on the Malhavoc message boards, Monte Cook released one more RPG product in early 2008, The Book of Experimental Might. This was quickly followed by The Book of Experimental Might II: Bloody, Bold and Resolute.

=== D&D Next ===
Cook returned to Wizards of the Coast in 2011. On September 20, 2011, Mike Mearls announced that Cook would be taking over his "Legends & Lore" column for the Wizards of the Coast website. In January 2012, it was revealed that Cook was to be the lead designer for the 5th edition of Dungeons & Dragons. In April 2012, Cook announced his departure from Wizards of the Coast due to "differences of opinion with the company" but not "with [his] fellow designers".

=== Monte Cook Games and Numenera ===
Cook co-founded Monte Cook Games, LLC with Shanna Germain in 2012, which is a roleplaying game company that has produced Numenera, The Strange, The Cypher System Rulebook, Invisible Sun, and No Thank You, Evil! which went to press in Fall 2015 after a Kickstarter campaign raised over $100,000 to fund its publication.

Numenera is a Kickstarter-funded table-top RPG created by Cook, set a billion years in the future in a science fantasy and post-apocalyptic setting with streamlined rules that prioritize the story, the action, and the wild ideas. It raised over $500,000 (more than 25 times its goal of $20,000). System playtesting was announced on October 30, 2012, and the game was released on August 14, 2013. Cook has stated that David "Zeb" Cook's (no relation) Planescape fantasy world was a significant influence on concepts in Numenera.

The Ninth World of Numenera was also the setting for a 2013 release of the Thunderstone Advance deck-building game by Alderac Entertainment Group, as well as the 2017 video game Torment: Tides of Numenera, which was developed by InXile Entertainment after a successful Kickstarter campaign.

The Strange is a Kickstarter-funded table-top RPG created by Cook and Bruce Cordell using the same Cypher System ruleset as Numenera. The game, which involves traveling through different worlds known as Recursions, was released in August 2014.

Invisible Sun is a Kickstarter-funded table-top role-playing game created by Monte Cook Games, with a street date released of September 20, 2018. It is a surreal fantasy game with many game accessories.

Stealing Stories for the Devil is a Kickstarter-funded table-top role-playing created by Monte Cook Games. It was released in February 2023. It is billed as a reality-altering heist game, where player characters use different abilities to lie to reality. It is a boxed set with board game-like aspects.

Tidal Blades, the Roleplaying Game is a Kickstarter-funded table-top RPG created by Cook and Shanna Germain using the Cypher System ruleset. The game was released on August 14, 2024. It is a tropical fantasy game located around the near islands and coastal city of Naviri, surrounded by a frozen temporal rift called The Fold. It was Kickstarted along "Tidal Blades 2, Rise of the Unfolders", the boardgame.

== Career ==
=== Author ===
Monte Cook is a graduate of the Clarion Science Fiction and Fantasy Writer's Workshop. After graduating from the 1999 workshop, he has published the novels The Glass Prison and Of Aged Angels. He has also published short stories like "Born in Secrets" (in Amazing Stories), "The Rose Window" (in Realms of Mystery), and "A Narrowed Gaze" (in Realms of the Arcane). He also writes a continuing Call of Cthulhu fiction series, The Shandler Chronicles, in Game Trade Magazine.

In the non-fiction genre, Cook has written The Skeptic's Guide to Conspiracies.

=== Video games ===
Cook wrote dialogue for the MMORPG Marvel Heroes.

== Personal life ==
He was married to Sue Weinlein Cook.
