= Malhavoc Press =

Tabletop role-playing game publisher

- Industry: Role-playing game
- Founded: 2001
- Defunct: 2009
- Successor: Monte Cook Games
- Key people: Monte Cook (Founder)
- Parent: White Wolf Publishing, Sword and Sorcery Studios

Malhavoc Press is an American publisher of role-playing games, specializing in third-party material for Dungeons & Dragons' third edition.

== History ==
Game designer Monte Cook left Wizards of the Coast in April 2001, founding Malhavoc Press as a d20 System imprint in May 2001. In July 2001 Cook signed with White Wolf's Sword & Sorcery Studios, at that time the largest independent publisher of d20 material, so that they could handle publishing matters while he focused on game design and writing.

The company's first product was The Book of Eldritch Might (2001). This was the first commercial book published exclusively as a PDF that was released by a print publisher. It was an immediate success and has been credited with demonstrating the viability of PDF publishing within the role-playing industry. This and other early Malhavoc products were initially released only in electronic format through the Malhavoc site, though print versions of most of them were subsequently released by Sword & Sorcery. Malhavoc worked with Fiery Dragon Productions after the latter left Sword & Sorcery in 2002, and the majority of Fiery Dragon's licenses were taken from Malhavoc.

In 2001 Malhavoc won the ENnie Award for Best Official Website, and in 2003 for Best Publisher.

While the company was successful, Monte Cook announced in August 2008 that he had originally moved on from Wizards of the Coast primarily to write fiction, rather than design and release RPG products, and that "there are other areas I'd like to explore creatively". As such, "Malhavoc Press and virtually all game-related work" on Cook's part was put "on the back-burner" at that time, though he stated that he was not closing the press and left open the possibility of releasing future work under the Malhavoc name, should he later desire (which did happen). August 2008 also saw the sale of Malhavoc's publisher, Sword & Sorcery Studios, by its owner, White Wolf. Malhavoc was never formally closed, but has not released any new product since 2009; Cook formed a new publishing company—Monte Cook Games—in 2012.

== Malhavoc Releases ==
Most releases were written by Monte Cook, but other authors (such as Bruce Cordell, Sean K. Reynolds, Skip Williams, and Mike Mearls) also wrote for the company in its first few years.

- The Book of Eldritch Might (2001) [2001 ENnies: Best Editor; Best Rulebook or Accessory; Best Writer]
- Demon God's Fane (2001)
- If Thoughts Could Kill (2001) [2002 ENnie: Best Adventure]
- Book of Eldritch Might II: Songs and Souls of Power (2002)
- The Banewarrens (2002) [2003 ENnie: Best Adventure]
- Requiem for a God (2002)
- Skreyn's Register: The Bonds of Magic Vols. 1 and 2 (2002) [compiled into a single-volume print release later that year]
- The Book of Eldritch Might III: The Nexus (2002)
- The Book of Hallowed Might (2003) [updated to 3.5 edition in a 2004 re-release]
- Mindscapes: A Psion's Guide (2003)
- Mindscapes: Beasts of the Id (2003)
- Mindscapes (2003) [print compilation of the two prior Mindscapes releases, which were PDF only]
- When the Sky Falls (2003)
- Monte Cook's Arcana Unearthed: A Variant Player's Handbook (2003) [2004 ENnie: Best d20 Game]
- Monte Cook's Arcana Unearthed DM's Screen and Player's Guide (2003)
- Cry Havoc (2003)
- Anger of Angels (2003)
- Chaositech (2004)
- Legacy of the Dragons (2004)
- The Complete Book of Eldritch Might (2004) [2004 ENnie: Best Revision, Update, or Compilation]
- Book of Hallowed Might II: Portents and Visions (2004)
- Children of the Rune (2004) [fiction collection]
- Hyperconscious: Explorations in Psionics (2004)
- Beyond Countless Doorways (2004) [2005 ENnie: Best Art, Cover]
- Grimoire II (2004)
- Mystic Secrets: The Lore of Word and Rune (2004)
- The Book of Iron Might (2004)
- Monte Cook's Arcana Evolved (2005) [2005 ENnies: Best Art, Interior; Best d20 Game]
- Ruins of Intrigue (2005)
- Transcendence (2005)
- The Book of Roguish Luck (2005)
- The Dragons' Return (2005) [fiction collection]
- Monte Cook Presents: Iron Heroes (2005)
- The Iron Heroes Bestiary (2005)
- Mastering Iron Heroes (2005)
- Spell Treasury (2005) [2006 ENnie: Best Art, Cover]
- Ptolus: City by the Spire (2006) [2007 ENnies: Best Cartography; Best Product; Best Production Values; Best Setting]
- PT 1: A Player's Guide to Ptolus (2006)
- PT 2: The World of Praemal (2006)
- PT 3: Organizations (2006)
- PT 4: Districts of the City, Vol. 1 (2006)
- PT 5: Districts of the City, Vol. 2 (2006)
- PT 6: DM's Companion (2006)
- PT 7: Beneath the Streets (2006)
- PT 8: Adventures (2006)
- PT 9: The Spire (2006)
- The Night of Dissolution (2006)
- Secrets of the Delver's Guild (2007)
- Earthblood (2008)
- The Book of Experimental Might (2008)
- The Book of Experimental Might Vol. II (2008) [2008 ENnie: Best Electronic Book]
- Dark Tidings (2009)
- The Collected Book of Experimental Might (2009)
