= Curtis =

- Pronunciation: /kɜːrtɪs/
- Gender: Male
- Language: English

Origin
- Language: Anglo-Norman
- Origin: curteis
- Meaning: polite; courteous; well-bred

Other names
- Related names: Kertész; Kurt; Cortez; Carson

Curtis or Curtiss is a common English given name and surname of Anglo-Norman origin, deriving from the Old French curteis (Modern French courtois) which was in turn derived from Latin cohors. Nicknames include Curt, Curty and Curtie.

The name means "polite, courteous, or well-bred". It is a compound of curt- "court" and -eis "-ish". The spelling u to render [u] in Old French was mainly Anglo-Norman and Norman, when the spelling o [u] was the usual Parisian French one, Modern French ou [u]. -eis is the Old French suffix for -ois, Western French (including Anglo-Norman) keeps -eis, simplified to -is in English. The word court shares the same etymology but retains a Modern French spelling, after the orthography had changed.

It was brought to England (and subsequently, the rest of the Isles) via the Norman Conquest. In the United Kingdom, the name Curtis was at its height in 1996, when it was the 78th most popular boy's name in England and Wales. Curtis was the 72nd most popular boy's name in 1963 in the United States, but has declined in popularity there since. Many Hungarian immigrants in English-speaking countries with the last name Kertész have adopted the name Curtis, since it is pronounced similarly and helped them integrate into their new community.

== Surname ==
=== People ===
- Adam Curtis (born 1955), English television documentarian
- Alan Curtis (disambiguation)
- Alexander Curtis (disambiguation)
- Alice B. Curtis (1874–1956), American suffragist, writer
- Alice Turner Curtis (1860–1958), American writer
- Alison Curtis (born 1977), Canadian Irish radio presenter
- Allen Curtis (1877–1961), American film director
- Andrew Curtis (cricketer) (born 1943), English cricketer
- Anne Curtis (born 1985), Philippine actress
- Anthony Curtiss (1919–1981), American naturalist, elder brother of Sydney Curtiss and Thomas Quinn Curtiss
- Aubyn Curtiss (1925–2017), American politician
- Ben or Benjamin Curtis (disambiguation)
- Cathrine Curtis (1889– ?), American actress
- Catie Curtis (born 1965), American singer-songwriter
- Chad Curtis (born 1968), American former Major League Baseball player convicted of sexual assault
- Charles Curtis (disambiguation)
- Chet Curtis (1939–2014), American journalist
- Chris Curtis (fighter) (born 1987), American MMA fighter
- Chris Curtis (musician) (1941–2005), British drummer and singer, best known for being with The Searchers
- Chris Curtis (politician) (born 1994), British Member of Parliament
- Chuck Curtis (1935–2016), American football player and coach
- Cliff Curtis (baseball) (1881–1943), American baseball player
- Cliff Curtis (born 1968), New Zealand film and television actor
- Cyrus H. K. Curtis (1850–1933), American magazine publisher
- David Curtis (disambiguation)
- Dexter Curtis (1828–1898), American inventor and politician
- Dick Curtis (1902–1952), American actor
- Edmund Curtis (1881–1943), historian and professor of history
- Edward Curtis (disambiguation)
- Edwin Curtis (1906–1999), English Anglican archbishop in Mauritius
- Elden Francis Curtiss (born 1932), American prelate of the Roman Catholic Church
- Emma Curtiss Bascom (1828–1916), née Curtiss, American educator, suffragist and reformer
- Fanny Curtis (1908–2003), American sportswoman
- Findlay Curtis (born 2006), Scottish footballer
- George Ticknor Curtis (1812–1894), American politician and lawyer
- George William Curtis (1824–1892), American writer and public speaker
- Glenn Curtiss (1878–1930), American aviation pioneer and founder of the Curtiss Aeroplane and Motor Company
- H. W. Curtis (c. 1816–?), Wisconsin state senator
- H. W. Curtiss (1824–1902), American politician
- Harriot Curtis (1881–1974), American golfer
- Harry Curtis (baseball) (1883–1951), American baseball player
- Heber Doust Curtis (1872–1942), American astronomer
- Helen Noble Curtis (1874–1961), American activist, volunteer, educator and speaker
- Ian Curtis (1956–1980), English musician, lead singer of Joy Division
- James Curtiss (1803–1859), American politician
- James Webb Curtis (1856–1921), American physician and volunteer military personnel
- Jamie Lee Curtis (born 1958), American actress
- Jasmine Curtis (born 1994), Filipino actress
- Jim Curtiss (1861–1945), American baseball player
- John Curtis (disambiguation), also John Curtiss
- Joseph S. Curtis (1831–1878), American politician and lawyer
- Julian Wheeler Curtiss (1858–1944), golf equipment manufacturer
- Kathlyn Curtis, Canadian judge
- Kelly Curtis (1956–2026), American actress
- Kelly Curtis (skeleton racer) (born 1989), American skeleton racer
- Kevin Curtis (born 1978), American football player
- King Curtis (1934–1971), American saxophonist
- L. Perry Curtis (1932–2019), American historian of Ireland
- Larry Curtiss, American chemist
- Lee Curtis (born Peter Flannery), British musician
- Leon Curtiss (1861–1934), American politician
- Lionel George Curtis (1872–1955), founder of the Royal Institute of International Affairs
- Louis Curtiss (1865–1924), Canadian-born American architect
- Louisa Knapp Curtis (1851–1910), columnist and first editor of The Ladies Home Journal
- Mac Curtis (1939–2013), American musician
- Margaret Curtis (1883–1965), American golfer and tennis player
- Margaret Curtis (archaeologist) (1941–2022), British teacher and archaeologist
- Mark Curtis (British author), British political author
- Mark Curtis (SWP member) (born 1959), former American Socialist Worker's Party member
- Martha E. Sewall Curtis (1858–1915), American suffragist, writer
- Mary C. Curtis (born 1953), American journalist
- Mary Louise Curtis (1876–1970), founder of the Curtis Institute of Music, Philadelphia
- Mason Curtis (born 2005), American football player
- Matt Curtis, American college baseball coach
- McClendon Curtis (born 1999), American football player
- Michael Curtis (disambiguation)
- Moses Ashley Curtis (M.A. Curtis, 1808–1872), American botanist and mycologist
- Namahyoke Curtis (1861–1935), American nurse and civil leader
- Nannie Webb Curtis (1861–1920), American lecturer, temperance activist, and clubwoman
- Norma Curtis, British novelist
- Norman Curtis (footballer) (1924–2009), English football player
- Patrick Curtis (bishop) (1740–1832), Irish archbishop
- Patrick Curtis (producer) (born 1938), American producer
- Philip Curtis (1926–1951), English soldier
- Philip Curtiss (1885–1964), politician, novelist, and newspaper reporter
- Ralph Curtis (1898–1917), British flying ace
- Ralph Hamilton Curtiss (1880–1929), American astronomer
- Ralph Wormeley Curtis (1854–1922), American painter
- Reginald Salmond Curtis (1863–1922), British soldier
- Richard Curtis (born 1956), British comedy scriptwriter
- Ronan Curtis (born 1996), Irish football player
- Roy Curtiss, American microbiologist
- Samuel Curtis (S. Curtis) (1779–1860), English botanist
- Samuel Ryan Curtis (1805–1866), American Civil War Union general
- Sarah Curtis (geographer), British geographer and academic
- Scott Curtis (American football) (born 1964), American football player
- Scott Curtis (FBI agent) (fl. 1980s–2020s), American former FBI special agent
- Sidney Curtiss (1917–1994), American politician
- Sonny Curtis (1937–2025), American singer-songwriter
- Tackett Curtis, American football player
- Thomas Bradford Curtis (1911–1993), American Representative from Missouri
- Thomas Quinn Curtiss (1915–2000), French-born writer, and film and theatre critic
- Tom Curtis (disambiguation)
- Tommy Curtis (1952–2021), American college basketball player
- Tony Curtis (1925–2010), American actor
- Ulysses Curtis (1926–2013), American football player
- Ursula Curtiss (1923–1984), American mystery writer
- Virginia Henry Curtiss Heckscher (1875–1941), president of The Heckscher Foundation for Children
- Walker M. Curtiss (1852–1917), American politician
- Wayne Curtis (born 1980), English former footballer
- Wayne Curtis (footballer, born 1967), Welsh footballer
- Wilfred Curtis (1893–1977), Canadian airman
- Willa Pearl Curtis (1896–1970), American actress
- William Curtis (1746–1799), English botanist
- William Hanford Curtis (1873–1955), American circus superintendent
- Zelda Curtis (1923–2012), English author and journalist

=== Fictional characters ===
- Rey Curtis, in the television series Law & Order
- Izumi Curtis and her husband Sig, in the manga and anime series Fullmetal Alchemist
- Three brothers in The Outsiders: Ponyboy Curtis (the novel's narrator), Sodapop Curtis and Darrel "Darry" Curtis

== Given name ==
=== People ===
- Curtis Armstrong (born 1953), American actor
- Curtis Bolton (born 1995), American football player
- Curtis Brooks (born 1998), American football player
- Curtis Browning (born 1993), Australian Rugby Union player
- Curtis Bush (born 1962), American kickboxer
- Curtis Cheek (1958–2024), American bridge player and aerospace engineer
- Curtis Cheng, Hong Kong–Australian unsworn police employee shot dead by an Arab extremist
- Curtis Cochran, American politician
- Curtis Cregan (born 1977), American singer and actor
- Curtis Enis (born 1976), NFL running back
- Curtis Erwin, American politician
- Curtis Grace, American politician
- Curtis Granderson (born 1981), New York Mets outfielder
- Curtis Hanson (born 1945), American filmmaker
- Curtis Harrison (born 1978), Canadian actor
- Curtis Hertel (1953–2016), American politician
- Curtis Hertel Jr. (born 1978), American politician
- Curtis Hodges (born 1999), American football player
- Curtis Jackson III (born 1975), American rapper, actor and entrepreneur, known professionally as 50 Cent
- Curtis Jacobs (born 2002), American football player
- Curtis Jensen (born 1990), American shot putter
- Curtis Jerrells (born 1987), basketball player in the Israeli Premier League
- Curtis Jobling (born 1972), British author and illustrator
- Curtis Joseph (born 1967), Canadian ice hockey goaltender
- Curtis Lazar, ice hockey player
- Curtis Lee (1939–2015), American singer
- Curtis LeMay (1906–1990), United States Air Force general
- Curtis Martin (born 1973), American football player
- Curtis Mayfield (1942–1999), American singer-songwriter
- Curtis McDowald (born 1996), American fencer
- Curtis L. Meinert (1934–2023), American clinical trialist
- Curtis Naughton (born 1995), English rugby league footballer
- Curtis Painter (born 1985), American football quarterback
- Curtis R. Reitz (born 1929), law professor
- Curtis Robb (born 1972), British middle-distance runner
- Curtis Roberts (born 1975), West Indian cricketer
- Curtis Robinson (born 1998), American football player
- Curtis Rowe (born 1949), American basketball player
- Curtis Salgado (born 1954), rhythm and blues musician and singer-songwriter
- Curtis Samuel (born 1996), American football player
- Curtis Sironen (born 1993), Australian rugby league footballer
- Curtis Stewart (born 1983), American rapper, stage name Kidd Kidd
- Curtis Stigers (born 1965), American singer-songwriter
- Curtis Stone (born 1975), Australian TV chef
- Curtis Strange (born 1955), American golfer
- Curtis Warren (born 1963), British criminal
- Curtis Weaver (born 1998), American football player
- Curtis Woodhouse (born 1980), English football player and manager and boxer
- Curtis Yarvin (born 1973), American writer

=== Fictional characters ===
- Curtis Donovan, in the UK television series Misfits
- Curtis Hagen, in the television series White Collar
- Curtis Holt (Arrowverse), in the television series Arrow
- Curtis Manning (24 character), in the television series 24
- Curtis Wilkins, in the comic strip Curtis
- Curtis (Stargate), a recurring character in the television series Stargate Universe

== See also ==
- Courtois (disambiguation)
- Curtice
- Curtois
