= List of Dungeon Crawl Classics modules =

Dungeon Crawl Classics (DCC) is a series of tabletop role-playing game modules published by Goodman Games. The modules have been published for the third and fourth editions of Dungeons & Dragons and for the Dungeon Crawl Classics Role-Playing Game (DCC RPG). Some of the modules have been ported to the first edition of Advanced Dungeons & Dragons as well as Castles & Crusades.

The modules presented here are in separate lists based on the game or edition for which the adventure was published.

== Dungeons & Dragons 3rd edition ==
| Number | Title | Levels | Author(s) | Publication date | Notes |
|---|---|---|---|---|---|
| 0 | Legends are Made, Not Born | 0 | Chris Doyle | 2005 | |
| 1 | Idylls of the Rat King | 1–3 | Jeffrey Quinn | 2003 | |
| 2 | The Lost Vault of Tsathzar Rho | 1 | Mike Mearls | 2003 | |
| 3 | The Mysterious Tower | 3–5 | Joseph Goodman | 2003 | |
| 3.5 | The Haunted Lighthouse | 4–6 | Dave Arneson | 2003 | Exclusive for Gen Con Indy 2003 |
| 4 | Bloody Jack's Gold | 10–12 | Joe Crow | 2004 | |
| 5 | Aerie of the Crow God | 7–9 | Andrew Hind | 2004 | Nominee, Best Adventure, Gen Con ENnie Awards 2004 |
| 6 | Temple of the Dragon Cult | 8–10 | John Seavey | 2004 | |
| 7 | The Secret of Smuggler's Cove | 5–7 | Chris Doyle | 2004 | related to DCC #40 |
| 8 | Mysteries of the Drow | 7–9 | Jeff Quinn | 2004 | |
| 9 | Dungeon Geomorphs | N/A | Clayton Bunce | 2004 | Not an adventure. Map fragments to help GMs create adventures. |
| 10 | The Sunless Garden | 6–8 | Brendan J. LaSalle | 2004 | |
| 11 | The Dragonfiend Pact | 2 | Chris Doyle | 2004 | Nomination, Best Adventure, 2005 Gen Con ENnie Awards |
| 12 | The Blackguard's Revenge | 9–11 | F. Wesley Schneider | 2004 | |
| 12.5 | The Iron Crypt of the Heretics | 11–13 | Harley Stroh | 2005 | Sequel to DCC #12; Nomination, Best Adventure, 2006 Gen Con ENnie Awards |
| 13 | Crypt of the Devil Lich | 15 | Chris Doyle, Lisa Doyle, Mike Ferguson, Joseph Goodman, Andrew Hind, Jason Little, Adrian M. Pommier, Jeffrey Quinn, F. Wesley Schneider, Andrew N. Smith | 2005 | Gen Con 2004 Tournament Module; Winner, Best Adventure, 2005 Pen & Paper Fan Awards |
| 14 | Dungeon Interludes | 1–13 | Jason Little | 2005 | adventure compilation |
| 15 | Lost Tomb of the Sphinx Queen | 14–15 | Chris Doyle, Joe Crow | 2005 | |
| 16 | Curse of the Emerald Cobra | 6–8 | Michael Ferguson | 2005 | |
| 17 | Legacy of the Savage Kings | 4–6 | Harley Stroh | 2005 | |
| 17.5 | War of the Witch Queen | 7–9 | Harley Stroh | 2005 | Sequel to DCC #17; Exclusive for Dundracon 30, held February 17–20, 2006 |
| 18 | Citadel of the Demon Prince | 12–13 | Patrick Younts | 2005 | |
| 19 | The Volcano Caves | 7–9 | Luke Johnson | 2005 | |
| 20 | Shadows in Freeport | 6–8 | Robert J. Schwalb | 2005 | Nomination, Best Adventure, 2006 Gen Con ENnie Awards |
| 20.5 | The Mask of Death | 5–7 | Jason Little | 2005 | Exclusive for Gen Con Indy 2005; Tie-in to the 2008 film The Gamers: Dorkness Rising |
| 21 | Assault on Stormbringer Castle | 12–14 | Christina Stiles | 2005 | |
| 22 | The Stormbringer Juggernaut | 14–16 | Christina Stiles | 2006 | Sequel to DCC #21 |
| 23 | The Sunken Ziggurat | 5–7 | Richard Pocklington | 2006 | |
| 24 | Legend of the Ripper | 1–3 | Andrew Hind | 2006 | |
| 25 | The Dread Crypt of Srihoz | 9–11 | Jeremy Simmons, Neal Gamache | 2006 | |
| 26 | The Scaly God | 4–6 | Rick Maffei | 2006 | |
| 27 | Revenge of the Rat King | 4–6 | Harley Stroh | 2006 | Sequel to DCC #1; Printed with two different covers |
| 28 | Into the Wilds | 1–3 | Harley Stroh | 2006 | |
| 29 | The Adventure Begins | 1–2 | Bret Boyd, Michael Ferguson, Andrew Hind, Phillip Larwood, Jeff LaSala, Brendan J. LaSalle, Jason Little, Rob Manning, Greg Oppedisano, Adrian Pommier, George Strayton, Harley Stroh, Michael Tresca, Dieter Zimmerman | 2006 | adventure compilation |
| 30 | Vault of the Dragon Kings | 10 | Jason Little, Chris Doyle, Joseph Goodman, Jeff McSpadden, Aeryn "Blackdirge" Rudel, Harley Stroh | 2006 | Gen Con 2005 Tournament Module |
| 30.5 | Trek From The Vault | 9–11 | Jason Little | 2006 | PDF only |
| 31 | The Transmuter's Last Touch | 1–2 | Jeff LaSala | 2006 | |
| 32 | The Golden Palace of Zahadran | 14–16 | Greg Oppedisano | 2006 | |
| 33 | Belly of the Great Beast | 21–24 | Brendan J. LaSalle | | 2006 |
| 34 | Cage of Delirium | 6–8 | F. Wesley Schneider | 2006 | Nomination, Best Adventure, 2007 Gen Con ENnie Awards |
| 35 | Gazetteer of the Known Realms | N/A | Mike Ferguson, Jeff LaSala, Harley Stroh | 2006 | Complete Campaign Setting box set |
| 35A | Halls of the Minotaur | 0 | Harley Stroh | 2024 | Reprint of DCC #35 as stand-alone Mini-Module |
| 35B | The Thief Lord's Vault | 4-6 | Harley Stroh | 2024 | Reprint of DCC #35 as stand-alone Mini-Module |
| 36 | Talons of the Horned King | 3–5 | Mike Ferguson | 2006 | |
| 37 | The Slithering Overlord | 4–6 | Artem Serebrennikov | 2006 | |
| 38 | Escape from the Forest of Lanterns | 7–9 | Stephen Greer | 2007 | |
| 39 | The Ruins of Castle Churo | 1–3 | Alex Anderegg | 2007 | includes 3.5e DM's screen |
| 40 | Devil in the Mists | 7–9 | Mike Ferguson | 2007 | related to DCC #7 |
| 41 | The Lost Arrows of Aristemis | 1–3 | Smaugdragon | 2007 | |
| 42 | Secret of the Stonearm | 2–3 | Luke Johnson | 2007 | |
| 43 | Curse of the Barrens | 3–5 | Greg Oppedisano | 2007 | |
| 44 | Dreaming Caverns of the Duergar | 1–3 | Mike Ferguson | 2007 | |
| 45 | Malice of the Medusa | 1–3 | Andrew Hind | 2007 | |
| 46 | Book of Treasure Maps | N/A | Casey Christofferson, Kameron Franklin, Scott Green, Andrew Hind, Chris McCoy, Christina McCoy, Ken McCutchen, Jeremy Simmons | 2007 | adventure compilation |
| 47 | Tears of the Genie | 6–8 | Phillip Larwood | 2007 | |
| 48 | The Adventure Continues | 4–6 | Eric Artis, B. Matthew Conklin III, Ken Hart, Ruth Lampi, Phillip Larwood, Jeff LaSala, Brendan J. LaSalle, Jason Little, Mike Ferguson, Stephen S. Greer, Greg Oppedisano, Artem V. Serebrennikov, Jeremy Simmons, Justin Sipla, Jessica Van Oort | 2007 | |
| 49 | Palace in the Wastes | 6–7 | Chris Doyle, Justin Georgi, Melissa Georgi, Luke Johnson, Jeff LaSala, Jason Little, Rick Maffei, Greg Oppedisano, Adrian M. Pommier, Aeryn "Blackdirge" Rudel, Justin Sipla, Christina Stiles, Harley Stroh | 2007 | Gen Con 2006 Tournament Module |
| 50 | Vault of the Iron Overlord | 7–9 | Monte Cook | 2007 | Nomination, Best Adventure, 2008 Gen Con ENnie Awards |
| 51 | Castle Whiterock | 1–15 | Chris Doyle, Adrian Pommier, Harley Stroh, Jeff LaSala | 2007 | mega-dungeon campaign box set |
| 51.5 | The Sinister Secret of Whiterock | 1–3 | Harley Stroh | 2007 | |
| 52 | Chronicle of the Fiend | 0–3 | Mike Ferguson, Ken Hart, Andrew Hind, Phillip Larwood, Rick Maffei, Ross Payton, Adrian Pommier, Harley Stroh | 2008 | Gen Con 2007 Tournament Module |

== Dungeons & Dragons 4th edition ==
| Number | Title | Levels | Author(s) | Publication date | Notes |
|---|---|---|---|---|---|
| FRP | Punjar: The Tarnished Jewel | N/A | Harley Stroh | 2008 | A Gazetteer of the Wicked City of Punjar; Released on FreeRPG Day 2008 |
| 53 | Sellswords of Punjar | 1 | Harley Stroh | 2008 | Part of the "Punjar Adventure Path" |
| 54 | Forges of the Mountain King | 1 | Harley Stroh | 2008 | Part of the "Mountain King Adventure Path" |
| 55 | Isle of the Sea Drake | 1 | Adrian Pommier | 2008 | |
| 56 | Scions of Punjar | 4 | Chris Doyle | 2008 | Part of the "Punjar Adventure Path" |
| 57 | Wyvern Mountain | 4 | Michael Ferguson | 2008 | Part of the "Mountain King Adventure Path" |
| 58 | The Forgotten Portal | 4 | Chris Doyle | 2009 | |
| 59 | Mists of Madness | 1 | Harley Stroh | 2009 | |
| 60 | Thrones of Punjar | 7–9 | Rick Maffei | 2009 | Part of the "Punjar Adventure Path" |
| 61 | Citadel of the Corruptor | 7–9 | Adrian Pommier | 2009 | Part of the "Mountain King Adventure Path" |
| 62 | Shrine of the Fallen Lama | 10–12 | Nigel McClelland, Ben Redmond | 2009 | |
| 63 | The Warbringer’s Son | 1 | Mike Ferguson, Rick Maffei, Adrian Pommier | 2009 | Gen Con 2008 Tournament Module |
| 64 | Codex of the Damned | 5 | Phillip Larwood | 2010 | |
| 65 | Caves of the Crawling Lord | 8 | Patrice Crespy | 2011 | |
| 66 | The Vampire’s Vengeance | 6–7 | Adrian Pommier | 2011 | |
| C9 | Tomb of the Blind God | 8 | Aeryn "Blackdirge" Rudel | 2009 | Exclusive released at several Conventions in 2009 |

== Dungeon Crawl Classics Role Playing Game ==
| Number | Title | Levels | Author(s) | Publication date | Notes |
|---|---|---|---|---|---|
| 66.5 | Doom of the Savage Kings | 1 | Harley Stroh | 2012 | Limited edition incentive for pre-orders of DCCRPG, later reprinted. |
| 67 | Sailors on the Starless Sea | 0 | Harley Stroh | 2012 | |
| 68 | The People of the Pit | 1 | Joseph Goodman | 2012 | |
| 69 | The Emerald Enchanter | 2 | Joseph Goodman | 2012 | |
| 70 | Jewels of the Carnifex | 3 | Harley Stroh | 2012 | |
| 71 | The 13th Skull | 4 | Joseph Goodman | 2012 | |
| 72 | Beyond the Black Gate | 5 | Harley Stroh | 2012 | |
| 73 | Emirikol Was Framed! | 4 | Michael Curtis | 2012 | |
| 74 | Blades Against Death | 4 | Harley Stroh | 2012 | |
| 75 | The Sea Queen Escapes | 3 | Michael Curtis | 2013 | |
| 76 | Colossus, Arise! | 8 | Harley Stroh | 2013 | |
| 76.5 | Well of the Worm | 1 | Harley Stroh | 2013 | Converted from 3e by Daniel J. Bishop; First Appeared in DCC #29 The Adventure Begins; Special print release for Gen Con 2013 |
| 77 | The Croaking Fane | 3 | Michael Curtis | 2013 | |
| 77.5 | The Tower Out of Time† | 2 | Michael Curtis | 2013 | Offered as a special incentive to GMs during the DCCRPG World Tour 2013 |
| 78 | Fate's Fell Hand | 2 | Harley Stroh | 2013 | |
| 79 | Frozen in Time | 1 | Michael Curtis | 2013 | |
| 79.5 | The Tower of the Black Pearl | 1 | Harley Stroh | 2013 | Converted from 3e by Daniel J. Bishop; First Appeared in DCC #29 The Adventure Begins; Special print release for Gen Con 2013 |
| 80 | Intrigue at the Court of Chaos | 1 | Michael Curtis | 2014 | |
| 80.5 | Glipkerio’s Gambit† | 2 | Jobe Bittman | 2014 | |
| 81 | The One who Watches from Below | 1 | Jobe Bittman | 2014 | |
| 82 | Bride of the Black Manse | 3 | Harley Stroh | 2014 | First printing includes bonus adventure Blood for the Serpent King by Edgar Johnson. The 2017 reprint includes bonus adventure Floating Oasis of the Ascended God by Stephen Newton |
| 82.5 | Dragora's Dungeon | 1 | Harley Stroh | 2014 | Originally released for 4E as Master Dungeons M1: Dragora's Dungeon |
| 83 | The Chained Coffin | 5 | Michael Curtis | 2014 | Originally released as a box set, it was later rereleased as a hardcover book compiled with 83.1, 83.2, and other supplemental material. |
| 83.1 | Tales of the Shudder Mountain | Various | Michael Curtis | 2016 | *The Grave Pool (level 4); *Moonricket Bridge (Level 1); *The Witchman of Darkweather Mountain (Level 5) |
| 83.2 | Death Among the Pines | 3 | Michael Curtis | 2016 | |
| 84 | Peril on the Purple Planet | 4 | Harley Stroh | 2014 | |
| 84.1 | The Rock Awakens | 4 | Terry Olson | 2014 | |
| 84.2 | Synthetic Swordsmen of the Purple Planet | 5 | Jim Wampler | 2014 | |
| 84.3 | Sky Masters of the Purple Planet | 6 | Jim Wampler | 2016 | |
| 85 | The Making of the Ghost Ring | 4 | Michael Curtis | 2015 | |
| 86 | Hole in the Sky | 0 | Brendan J. LaSalle | 2015 | |
| 87 | Against the Atomic Overlord | 5 | Edgar Johnson | 2015 | |
| 87.5 | Grimtooth's Museum of Death | 1 | Jobe Bittman | 2015 | |
| 88 | The 998th Conclave of Wizards | 6 | Jobe Bittman | 2015 | |
| 88.5 | Curse of the Kingspire | 2 | Harley Stroh | 2016 | Originally released for 4E as Master Dungeons M2: Curse of the Kingsport |
| 89 | Chaos Rising | Various | Terry Olson, Daniel J. Bishop, Jobe Bittman, Michael Curtis, Harley Stroh | 2016 | Elzemon and the Blood-Drinking Box (Level 1 by Olson); *The Imperishable Sorceress (Level 1 by Bishop); *Glipkerio’s Gambit (Level 2 by Bittman); *The Tower Out of Time (Level 2 by Curtis); *The Jeweler That Dealt in Stardust (Level 3 by Stroh); *The Undulating Corruption (Level 5 by Curtis); *The Infernal Crucible of Sezrekan the Mad (Level 5 by Stroh) |
| 90 | The Dread God Al-Khazadar | 4 | Daniel J. Bishop | 2016 | |
| 91 | Journey to the Center of Aereth | 4 | Harley Stroh | 2016 | |
| 91.1 | The Lost City of Barako | 6 | Harley Stroh | 2016 | |
| 91.2 | Lairs of Lost Agharta | 6 | Steven Bean, Daniel J. Bishop, Tim Callahan, Stephen Newton, Terry Olson, Harley Stroh | 2016 | |
| 92 | Through the Dragonwall | 3 | Daniel J. Bishop | 2016 | |
| 92.5 | Dread on Demon Crown Hill | 2 | Michael Curtis | 2017 | Available only through brick and mortar retailers |
| 93 | Moon-Slaves of the Cannibal Kingdom | 2 | Edgar Johnson | 2017 | |
| 94 | Neon Knights | 3 | Brendan J. LaSalle | 2017 | |
| 95 | Enter the Dagon | 5 | Harley Stroh | 2017 | |
| 96 | The Tower of Faces | 6 | Nick Judson | 2018 | The Tower of Faces was selected as the winner of the Rodneys Design Award, OSR track, at Gamehole Con 2016. |
| 97 | The Queen of Elfland's Son | 1 | Michael Curtis | 2018 | |
| 98 | Imprisoned in the God-Skull | 6 | Michael Curtis | 2018 | |
| 99 | The Star Wound of Abaddon | 3 | Marzio Muscedere | 2018 | Winner of the 2017 Rodneys Design Award (DCC Track), at Gamehole Con 2017. |
| 100 | The Music of the Spheres is Chaos | 5 | Harley Stroh | 2022 | |
| 101 | The Veiled Vaults of the Onyx Queen | 0 | Marzio Muscedere | 2022 | |
| 102 | Dweller Between the Worlds | 1 | Marc Bruner | 2022 | |
| 103 | Bloom of the Blood Garden | 0 | Edgar Johnson | 2023 | |
| 104 | Return to the Starless Sea | 0 | Terry Olson & Team | 2024 | Run originally as the 2022 Gen Con DCC Tournament. |
| 105 | By Mitra's Bones, Meet Thy Doom! | 2 | Stephen Newton | 2024 | A Dark Tower adventure |
| 106 | Trials of the Trapmaster's Tomb | 0 | Terry Olson | 2024 | |
| | Against the Thieves Guild | 2 | Alex Kurowski | 2024 | |
| 107 | Forgotten Dangers | 1-3 | Michael Curtis, Harley Stroh, Julian Bernick, Terry Olson | 2024 | Compilation of earlier adventures |
| 108 | The Seventh Thrall of Sezrekan | 0 | Harley Stroh | 2025 | |
| 109 | Beneath the Isle of Serpents | 2 | Bob Brinkman | 2025 | |
| 110 | Sacrificial Pyre of Thracia | 1 | Scott Moore | 2025 | |
| 111 | Grave Robbers of Thracia | 0 | Bob Brinkman | 2025 | |
| 112 | Mother of Monsters | 2 | Marzio Muscedere | 2026 | |
| 113 | Temple of the Blind Sultan | 2 | Bob Brinkman | 2026 | |

† Adventures in these also available in DCC #89 Chaos Rising

=== Dungeon Crawl Classics Lankhmar ===
These adventures were released for use with the Lankhmar campaign setting, for the Dungeon Crawl Classics role-playing game. Authorized by the estate of Fritz Leiber.

| Number | Title | Levels | Author(s) | Publication Date | Notes |
|---|---|---|---|---|---|
| GMG5203 | Through Ningauble's Cave | N/A | Michael Curtis | 2015 | |
| GMG5204 | The Patrons of Lankhmar | N/A | Michael Curtis | 2015 | Source book of patrons. |
| GMG5206 | Masks of Lankhmar | 1 | Michael Curtis | 2015 | |
| FRP | Free RPG Day 2016 | 1 | Michael Curtis | 2016 | Contains two adventures, one for DCC Lankhmar: The Madhouse Meet. Five variant covers. |
| 0 | No Small Crimes in Lankhmar | 1 | Michael Curtis | 2018 | GMG5210. Included in DCC Lankhmar boxed set. |
| 1 | Gang Lords of Lankhmar | 1 | Harley Stroh | 2018 | GMG5211 |
| 2 | The Fence's Fortuitous Folly | 2 | Daniel J. Bishop | 2018 | GMG5212 |
| 3 | Acting Up in Lankhmar | 2 | Michael Curtis | 2018 | GMG5213 |
| 4 | Violence for Votishal | 4 | Terry Olsen | 2018 | GMG5214 |
| 5 | Blasphemy & Larceny in Lankhmar | 5 | Bob Brinkman | 2018 | GMG5215 |
| 6 | Cheating Death | 1 | Tim Callahan | 2018 | GMG5216 |
| 7 | A Dozen Lankhmar Locations | N/A | Michael Curtis | 2018 | GMG5217 Source book of adventure locations. |
| 8 | The Land of the Eight Cities | 3 | Michael Curtis | 2018 | GMG5218 Source book and adventure module. |
| 9 | Grave Matters | 2 | Michael Curtis | 2019 | GMG5222 Includes the level 1 adventure "The Madhouse Meet" by Michael Curtis, which was originally included in the 2016 Free RPG Day offering. |
| 10 | Unholy Nights in Lankhmar | 2 | Michael Curtis | 2019 | GMG5223 Holiday themed adventure. |
| 11 | The Rats of Ilthmar | 3 | Michael Curtis | 2020 | GMG5224 |
| GMGDCCD20 | DCC Day 2020 Adventure Pack | 3 | Harley Stroh | 2020 | Contains three adventures, one for DCC Lankhmar: "The Heist." |
| GMG5225 | The Greatest Thieves in Lankhmar | 3 | Julian Bernick, Mike Bolam, Bob Brinkman, Marc Bruner (Tournament Coordinator), Alasdair Cunningham, Tim Deschene, Marzio Muscedere, Terry Olson, Harley Stroh (Lead writer), Thorin Thompson | 2021 | Included with Greatest Thieves in Lankhmar boxed set |
| GMG5225 | Dicing With Death | 3 | Steve Bean | 2021 | Included with Greatest Thieves in Lankhmar boxed set |
| 12 | Mercy on the Day of the Eel | 2 | Brendan J. LaSalle | 2022 | GMG5226 |
| 13 | Treachery in the Beggar City | 3 | Michael Curtis | 2022 | GMG5228 |
| 14 | Thieves of Cold Corner | 3 | Harley Stroh | 2022 | GMG5229 |
| 15 | The House of Jade and Shadow | 1 | Marzio Muscadere | 2024 | GMG5230 |

=== Dungeon Crawl Classics Empire of the East ===
These adventures are based in the Empire of the East setting, officially licensed by the estate of Fred Saberhagen. For use with the Empire of the East campaign rule book.

| Number | Title | Levels | Author(s) | Publication Date | Notes |
|---|---|---|---|---|---|
| 1 | Hunt for the Howling God | 1 | Julian Bernick | 2022 | GMG5239 |

=== Dungeon Crawl Classics Dying Earth ===
These adventures are based in the Dying Earth book series by Jack Vance. For use with the Dying Earth campaign box setting, Produced and distributed by agreement with the Lotts Agency.

| Number | Title | Levels | Author(s) | Publication Date | Notes |
|---|---|---|---|---|---|
| 0 | Pilgrims of the Black Obelisk | 0 | Julian Bernick & Marc Bruner | 2022 | GMG5266 |
| 1 | The Laughing Idol of Lar-Shan | 1 | Julian Bernick | 2022 | GMG5267 |
| 2 | The Sorcerer's Tower of Sanguine Slant | 2 | Terry Olsen | 2022 | GMG5268 |
| 3 | Magnific Machinations at the Grand Exposition of Marvels | 3 | Bob Brinkman | 2022 | GMG5269 |
| 4 | Mind-Weft of the Moonstone Palace | 4 | Marc Bruner | 2022 | GMG5270 |
| 5 | Penumbra of the Polar Ape | 5 | Harley Stroh | 2022 | GMG5271 |
| 6 | The Great Visp Hunt | 2 | Julian Bernick | 2022 | GMG5272 |
| 7 | Phantoms of the Ectoplasmic Cotillion | 3 | Bob Brinkman | 2022 | GMG5273 |
| 8 | The House on the Island | 3 | Erol Otis | 2022 | GMG5274 |
| 9 | Time Tempests at the Nameless Rose | 2 | Julian Bernick | 2023 | GMG5275 |
| 10 | Passage to the Manse of Erudite Wonderment | 2 | Marc Bruner, Julian Bernick, and Bob Brinkman | 2024 | GMG5276 |

=== Dungeon Crawl Classics Horror ===
A line of horror themed adventures, for the Dungeon Crawl Classics role-playing game. Includes new adventures, and reprints of previous Halloween modules.

| Number | Title | Levels | Author(s) | Publication Date | Notes |
|---|---|---|---|---|---|
| 1 | They Served Brandolyn Red | 0 | Stephen Newton | 2015 | Second printing of the adventure. Rebranded under the DCC Horror Line. GMG53015A |
| 2 | The Sinister Sutures of The Sempstress | 6 | Michael Curtis | 2016 | Second printing of the adventure. Rebranded under the DCC Horror Line. GMG53016A |
| 3 | Shadow Under Devil's Reef | 1 | Jon Hook | 2017 | Will be rebranded in the DCC Horror line with the next printing of the module. |
| 4 | The Corpse That Love Built | 2 | Stephen Newton | 2018 | GMG53018 |
| 5 | Creep, Skrag, Creep! | 0 | Stephen Newton | 2019 | GMG53019 |
| 6 | The Web of All-Torment | 3 | Brendan J. LaSalle | 2020 | GMG53020 |
| 7 | It Consumes! | 2 | Thorin Thompson | 2021 | GMG53021 |
| 8 | Night of the Bog Beast | 2 | Bob Brinkman | 2022 | GMG53022 |

=== Holiday Modules ===
A line of holiday-themed adventures, for the Dungeon Crawl Classics role-playing game.

| Number | Title | Levels | Author(s) | Publication Date | Notes |
|---|---|---|---|---|---|
| 2013 Holiday Module | The Old God's Return | 1 | Michael Curtis | 2013 | |
| 2014 Holiday Module | Trials of the Toy Makers | 2 | Steven Bean | 2014 | |
| 2015 Halloween Module | They Served Brandolyn Red | 0 | Stephen Newton | 2015 | |
| 2015 Holiday Module | Advent of the Avalanche Lords | 3 | Tim Callahan | 2015 | |
| 2016 Halloween Module | The Sinister Sutures of the Sempstress | 6 | Michael Curtis | 2016 | |
| 2016 Holiday Module | Twilight of the Solstice | 4 | Marc Bruner | 2016 | Introduces scratch-off character sheets to the DCC RPG |
| 2017 Halloween Module | Shadow Under Devil's Reef | 1 | Jon Hook | 2017 | |
| 2018 Halloween Module | The Corpse That Love Built | 2 | Stephen Newton | 2018 | |
| 2017 Holiday Module | New Year's Evil | 2 | Brendan J. LaSalle | 2017 | For X-Crawl Classics RPG |
| 2019 Halloween Module | Creep, Skrag, Creep | 0 | Stephen Newton | 2019 | |
| 2020 Holiday Module | The Doom that Came to Christmas Town | 2 | Marzio Muscedere | 2020 | |
| 2021 Holiday Module | Feast of the Gobbler Witch | 0 | Stephen Newton | 2021 | Thanksgiving-themed holiday module |
| 2022 Valentine's Day Module | Love in the Age of Gongfarmers | 2 | Stephen Newton | 2022 | Valentine's Day themed module. |
| Holiday Module #11 | Came the Monsters of Midwinter | 2 | Brendan LaSalle | 2022 | First in series to use Holiday Module numbering. |
| Holiday Module #12 GMG54023 | Love Mutants of Castle Heartache | 3 | Brendan LaSalle | 2023 | Valentine's Day themed module. |

=== Convention Modules ===
Modules designed for convention play, in shorter time slots.

| Number | Title | Levels | Author(s) | Publication Date | Notes |
|---|---|---|---|---|---|
| 2017 Convention Module | Blood for the Serpent King | 2 | Edgar Johnson | 2017 | |
| 2018 Convention Module | Tower of the Black Pearl | 1 | Harley Stroh | 2018 | Re-issue of module #79.5 |
| 2019 Convention Module | The Inn at Five Points | 2 | Brendan J. LaSalle | 2019 | |
| 2020 Convention Module | The Accursed Heart of the World Ender | 0 | Brendan J. LaSalle | 2020 | |

=== Road Crew Modules ===
| Number | Title | Levels | Author(s) | Publication Date | Notes |
|---|---|---|---|---|---|
| GMGRC22-40 | Van on the Run | 1 | Terry Olsen | 2022 | Road Crew Module #1. Given out to judges who ran games for Road Crew events in 2022. |
| GMGRC23-60 | Caught in the Mouth of Chaos | 1 | ZOG | 2023 | Road Crew Pit Stop #2. Given out to judges who ran games for Road Crew events in 2023. |

=== Free RPG Day Modules ===
| Number | Title | Levels | Author(s) | Publication date | Notes |
|---|---|---|---|---|---|
| | Punjar: The Tarnished Jewel | N/A | Harley Stroh | 2008 | A Gazetteer of the Wicked City of Punjar; Released on FreeRPG Day 2008 |
| | Free RPG Day Adventure Starter† | Various | Joseph Goodman, Harley Stroh | 2011 | Release for Free RPG Day 2011; Contains two short adventures The adventures in this release are reprinted in the DCCRPG core book. *The Portal Under the Stars (Level 0 by Goodman); *The Infernal Crucible of Sezrekan the Mad (Level 5 by Stroh) |
| | Free RPG Day 2012† | Various | Micheal Curtis, Harley Stroh | 2012 | Release for Free RPG Day 2012; Contains two short adventures: *The Jeweler that Dealt in Stardust (Level 3 by Stroh); *The Undulating Corruption (Level 5 by Curtis) |
| | Free RPG Day 2013† | 1 | Daniel J. Bishop | 2013 | Release for Free RPG Day 2013; Contains one DCCRPG adventure and one Maximum X-Crawl adventure *The Imperishable Sorceress (Level 1 by Bishop) |
| | Free RPG Day 2014† | 1 | Terry Olson | 2014 | Release for Free RPG Day 2014; Contains one DCCRPG adventure and one Maximum X-Crawl adventure *Elzemon and the Blood-Drinking Box (Level 1 by Olson) |
| | Free RPG Day 2015 | n/a | n/a | 2015 | DCC RPG judge's screen (no adventure included) |
| | Free RPG Day 2016 | Various | Michael Curtis, Jim Wampler | 2016 | Contains two adventures: *DCC Lankhmar: The Madhouse Meet (level 1 by Curtis) *Mutant Crawl Classics: The Museum at the End of Time (Level 0 by Wampler) Five variant covers. |
| | Free RPG Day 2017 | Various | Joseph Goodman, Michael Curtis | 2017 | Release for Free RPG Day 2017; Quick Start Rules; Contains two DCCRPG adventures: *The Portal Under the Stars (Level 0 by Goodman); *Gnole House (Level 1 by Curtis) |
| | Free RPG Day 2018 | Various | Joseph Goodman, Terry Olson | 2018 | Release for Free RPG Day 2018; Quick Start Rules; Contains two DCCRPG adventures: *The Portal Under the Stars (Level 0 by Goodman); *Man-Bait for the Soul Stealer (Level 2 by Olson) |
| | Free RPG Day 2019 | Various | Joseph Goodman, Julian Bernick | 2019 | Release for Free RPG Day 2019; Quick Start Rules; Contains two DCCRPG adventures: *The Portal Under the Stars (Level 0 by Goodman); *Geas of the Star-chons (level 1 by Bernick) |
| | Free RPG Day 2020 | Various | Joseph Goodman, Julian Bernick | 2020 | Release for Free RPG Day 2020; Quick Start Rules; Contains two DCCRPG adventures: *The Portal Under the Stars (level 0 by Goodman); *The Legend of the Silver Skull (Level 1 by Bernick) |
| GMGFRPGD21A | Tomb of the Savage Kings | 2 | Stephen Newton | 2021 | Release for Free RPG Day 2021 |
| GMGFRPGD22A | Danger in the Air! | 0 | Michael Curtis | 2022 | Release for Free RPG Day 2022 |
| GMGFRPGD23 | Piercing the Demon's Eye | 2 | Daniel J. Bishop | 2023 | Release for Free RPG Day 2023 |
| GMGFRPGD24 | Across the Veil of Time | 1 | Marzio Muscedere | 2024 | Release for Free RPG Day 2024 |
| GMGFRPGD25 | The Dying Light of Castle Whiterock | 1 | Alex Kurowski | 2025 | Release for Free RPG Day 2025 |
| | Pretenders to the Rat King's Throne | 1 | Martin T. Buiniki | 2026 | Release for Free RPG Day 2026 |

† Adventures in these also available in DCC #89 Chaos Rising

=== DCC Day Modules ===
Modules released annually during Goodman Games' "DCC Day" event.

| Number | Title | Levels | Author(s) | Publication Date | Notes |
|---|---|---|---|---|---|
| DCC Day #1 | Shadow of the Beakmen | 1 | Harley Stroh | 2020 | Released during DCC Day event. |
| 2020 DCC Day Adventure Pack | 2020 Adventure Pack | Various | Julian Bernick, Harley Stroh, Tim Callahan | 2020 | Contains three adventures: *Expedition to Algol (Level 1 by Bernick) *DCC Lankhmar: The Heist (Level 3 by Stroh) *Mutant Crawl Classics: Ruins of Future Past (Level 1 by Callahan based on a concept by Michael Curtis) |
| DCC Day #2 | Beneath the Well of Brass | 0 | Harley Stroh | 2021 | Released during DCC Day event. |
| 2021 DCC Day Adventure Pack | 2021 Adventure Pack | Various | Julian Bernick, Marc Bruner, Bob Brinkman | 2021 | Released during DCC Day event. Contains three adventures: *Temple Siege (Level 1 by Bernick) *DCC Dying Earth: Fathoms Below Witch Isle (Level 1 by Bruner) *Mutant Crawl Classics: The Neverwhen Rock (Level 0 by Brinkman based on a concept by Jim Wampler) |
| DCC Day #3 | Chanters in the Dark | 1 | Daniel J. Bishop | 2022 | Released during DCC Day event. |
| 2022 DCC Day Adventure Pack | 2022 Adventure Pack | 2 | Brendan J. LaSalle & Marzio Muscedere | 2022 | Released during DCC Day event. Contains two adventures: *Incident at Toad Fork (by LaSalle) *Mutant Crawl Classics: The Last Life Guardian (by Muscedere) |
| DCC Day #4 | Mutant Crawl Classics: Crash of the Titans | 3 | Tim Snider | 2023 | Released during DCC Day event |
| 2023 DCC Day Adventure Pack | 2023 Adventure Pack | Various | Jess Gabriell Cron & Dieter Zimmerman | 2023 | Released during DCC Day event. Contains two adventures: *The Rift of Seeping Night (Level 1 by Cron) *Grave of the Gearwright (Level 2 by Zimmerman) |
| DCC Day #5 | Gods of the Earth | 1 | Julian Bernick | 2024 | Released during DCC Day event |
| 2024 DCC Day Adventure Pack | 2024 Adventure Pack | Various | Marc Bruner & Brendan LaSalle | 2024 | Released during DCC Day event. Contains two adventures: *The Grinding Keep (Level 1 by Bruner) *Xcrawl: Tucson Death Storm! (Level 2 by LaSalle) |
| DCC Day #6 | The Key to Castle Whiterock | 1 | Michael Curtis | 2025 | Released during DCC Day event |
| 2025 DCC Day Adventure Pack | 2025 Adventure Pack | 1 | Ariel Churi & James M. Spahn | 2025 | Released during DCC Day event. Contains two adventures: *The Fall of Al-Razi (by Churi) *Xcrawl: Balticrawl Blitz (by Spahn) |
| DCC Day #7 | Pestilence at the Peak of Law | 2 | Stefan Surratt | 2026 | Released during DCC Day event |
| 2026 DCC Day Adventure Pack | 2026 Adventure Pack | 1 | Lou Hoefer & Erica Barlow | 2026 | Released during DCC Day event. Contains two adventures: *Mutant Crawl Classics: The Temple of Fluttering Terror (by Hoefer) *Xcrawl: The Crawl is Not Always Greener… (by Barlow) |

=== Program Guides & Yearbooks ===
| Number | Title | Levels | Author(s) | Publication date | Notes |
|---|---|---|---|---|---|
| GMGGC13 | Gen Con 2013 Program Guide | Various | Michael Curtis, Harley Stroh | 2013 | Release for Gen Con 2013; Contains two short adventures: *The Undulating Corruption (Level 5 by Curtis); *The Jeweler that Dealt in Stardust (Level 3 by Stroh) |
| GMGGC14 | Gen Con 2014 Program Guide | 2 | Jobe Bittman | 2014 | Release for Gen Con 2014 Contains one adventure: *The Emerald Enchanter Strikes Back (Level 2 by Bittman); Also contains bonus encounters for DCC #80, DCC #81 and DCC #82 |
| GMGGC15 | Gen Con 2015 Program Guide | Various | Harley Stroh, The DCC Cabal, Daniel J. Bishop, & Jon Hook | 2015 | Release for Gen Con 2015; Contains four short adventures: *The Seventh Pit of Serzrekan (Level 0 by Stroh); *The Hypercube of Myt (0 level tournament by The DCC Cabal); *The Black Feather Blade (Level 1 by Bishop); *Evil Reborn (Level 4 by Hook) |
| GMGGC16 | Gen Con 2016 Program Guide | Various | Dieter Zimmerman, Harley Stroh, Jim Wampler & the DCC Cabal | 2016 | Release for Gen Con 2016; Contains three short adventures: *Not in Kansas Anymore (Level 0 by Zimmerman) *The Way of the Dagon (DCC Spell Duel Tournament) *Death by Nexus (Level 0 Tournament by Wampler & the DCC Cabal) |
| GMGGC17 | Gen Con 2017 Program Guide | Various | Marc Bruner, Jon Hook, & Mark Bishop | 2017 | Release for Gen Con 2017; Contains three short adventures: *The Return of Scravis (Level 2 by Bruner, using the Dinosaur Crawl Classic rules presented in the guide) *The Thing that Should Not Be (Level 3 by Hook) *Sisters of the Moon Furnace (Level 0 by Bishop) |
| GMGGC18 | Gen Con 2018 Program Guide (The Black Heart of Thakulon the Undying) | n/a | Stephen Bean, Marc Bruner, Michael Curtis, Stephen Newton, Terry Olsen, & Harley Stroh | 2018 | 2017 Gen Con DCC Tournament Adventure |
| GMGGC19 | 2019 Yearbook (Riders on the Phlogiston) | n/a | Steve Bean, Julian Bernick, Marc Bruner, Eric Daum, Terry Olsen, & Harley Stroh | 2019 | 2018 Gen Con DCC Tournament Adventure |
| GMGGC20 | The Year That Shall Not Be Named | | | 2020 | |
| GMGGC21 | 2021 Yearbook | Various | Michael Curtis, Harley Stroh, Chris Doyle, & Brendan LaSalle | 2021 | Contents include: *Black Mountain Lights (Level 2 by Curtis) *The Pits of Lost Agharta (DCC tournament event by Stroh) |
| GMGGC22 | 2022 Yearbook | Various | Marzio Muscedere, & Alex Kurowski | 2022 | Contents include: *When Tolls the Bell of Ruin (Level 1 by Muscedere); *Secret of the Slayer's Sword (Level 12 by Kurowski) |
| GMGGC23 | Yearbook #11 | 0 | Brendan LaSalle | 2024 | Contents include: *The Forsaken Vault of the Crimson Oracle (Level 0 by LaSalle) |
| GMGGC24 | Yearbook #12 | Various | Lou Hoefer & Brendan LaSalle | 2025 | Contents include: *Air Farce One (Level 1 MCC by Hoefer); *The Doom Spell of Amaranth Seahold (Level 0 by LaSalle) |
| GMGGC25 | Yearbook #13 | | | 2026 | Contents include: *The Once Glorious Gate of Andwayne |

=== Hardcover Conversions ===
These are classic adventures, converted for use with Dungeon Crawl Classics. Both Dark Tower and Caverns of Thracia are DCC RPG conversions of adventures released as part of the Goodman Games Original Adventures Reincarnated series.

| Number | Title | Levels | Author(s) | Publication Date | Notes |
|---|---|---|---|---|---|
| GMG | Crypt of the Devil Lich | 6+ | Chris Doyle, Bob Brinkman | 2021 | |
| GMG | Dark Tower | 3+ | Jennell Jaquays, Bob Brinkman | 2024 | |
| GMG | Caverns of Thracia | 1-5 | Jennell Jaquays, Bob Brinkman | 2025 | |
| GMG | Castle Whiterock | 1-10 | Chris Doyle et al. | Announced | |
| GMG | City State of the Invincible Overlord | | Bob Bledsaw Sr., Michael Curtis et al. | Announced | |

== Other Rules Sets ==
=== Advanced Dungeons & Dragons 1st edition ===
These adventures were in most cases released as 3rd edition modules and were ported to the 1st edition as special releases for Gen Con.

| Number | Title | Levels | Author(s) | Publication Date | Notes |
|---|---|---|---|---|---|
| GMG50125E | The Iron Crypt of the Heretics | 11-13 | Harley Stroh | 2006 | Released in limited quantities at Gen Con 2006 |
| GMG-GC07 | Saga of the Witch Queen | 4–6, 6–8, 7–9 | Harley Stroh, John Hershberger | 2007 | Combination of DCC #17, a new module, and DCC #17.5; Released at Gen Con 2007 |
| GMGGC08 | Saga of the Rat King | 1–6 | Jeff Quinn, Harley Stroh, Jon Hershberger | 2008 | Combination of DCC #1 and DCC #27; Released at Gen Con 2008 |
| GMGGC08-2 | The Golden Auroch / Tower of the Black Pearl | 1 | Andrew Hind, Harley Stroh | 2008 | Two adventures formatted as a "flip book" Released at Gen Con 2008 |
| GMG5035 | Talons of the Horned King | 3–5 | Mike Ferguson | 2009 | Released at Gen Con 2009 |
| BBP1007 | The Secret of Smuggler's Cove | 5–7 | Chris Doyle | 2009 | Published by Black Blade Publishing; Produced under license from Goodman Games |

=== Castles & Crusades ===
Goodman Games has produced, under license, several adventure modules for Castles & Crusades by Troll Lord Games. In most cases these are 3rd edition modules which were ported to the new rules system.

| Number | Title | Levels | Author(s) | Publication Date | Notes |
|---|---|---|---|---|---|
| GG1 | The Mysterious Tower | 3–5 | Joseph Goodman | 2006 | port of DCC #3 |
| GG2 | Palace of Shadows | 4–6 | Chris Rutkowsky | 2006 | |
| GG3 | The Secret of Smugglers Cove | 5–7 | Chris Doyle | 2007 | port of DCC #7 |
| GG4 | The Slithering Overlord | 4–6 | Artem Serebrennikov | 2007 | port of DCC #37 |
| GG5 | The Dread Crypt of Srihoz | 9–11 | Jeremy Simmons, Neal Gamache | 2008 | port of DCC #25 |

=== Mutant Crawl Classics ===
These adventures were released for use with the post-apocalyptic Mutant Crawl Classics RPG, which is 100% compatible with Dungeon Crawl Classics RPG.

| Number | Title | Levels | Author(s) | Publication Date | Notes |
|---|---|---|---|---|---|
| 1 | Hive of the Overmind | 0 | Julian Bernick | 2017 | GMG6211 |
| 2 | A Fallen Star for All | 1 | Tim Callahan | 2017 | GMG6212 |
| 3 | Incursion of the Ultradimenson | 2 | Michael Curtis | 2017 | GMG6213 |
| 4 | Warlords of ATOZ | 3 | Jim Wampler | 2017 | GMG6214 |
| 5 | Blessings of the Vile Brotherhood | 4 | Harley Stroh | 2017 | GMG6215 |
| 6 | The Apocalypse Ark | 5 | Brendan J. LaSalle | 2017 | GMG6216 |
| 7 | Reliquary of the Ancient Ones | 0 | Marc Bruner & Jim Wampler | 2017 | GMG6217 |
| 8 | The Data Orb of Metakind | n/a | Jim Wampler with Tim Kask | 2017 | GMG6218 Not an adventure, but a supplement to be used with another adventure. |
| 8.5 | The Museum at the End of Time | 1 | Jim Wampler | 2018 | GMG62185 |
| 9 | Evil of the Ancients | 3 | Michael Curtis | 2018 | GMG6219 Ties in with module #3 Incursion of the Ultradimension |
| 10 | Seeking the Post-Humans | 0 | Brendan J. LaSalle | 2019 | GMG6220 |
| 11 | The Omnivary of Eden | 2 | Stephen Newton | 2021 | GMG6221 |
| | Home for the Holideath | 1 | Julian Bernick | 2018 | 2018 Holiday Module. GMG52018 |
| 12 | When Manimals Attack! | 2 | Tim Snider | 2022 | GMG6222 |
| 13 | Into the Glowing Depths | 2 | Michael Curtis | 2022 | GMG6223 |
| 14 | Mayhem on the Magtrain | 2 | Tim Snider | 2022 | GMG6224 |
| 15 | The Mutant Menace of Lab 47 | 3 | Stephen Newton | 2024 | GMG6225 |
| 16 | The Book of Monstrous Mutants | n/a | Various | 2026 | GMG6226 Sourcebook of new monsters |

=== X-Crawl Classics ===
These adventures were released for use with the X-Crawl Classics RPG, which is 100% compatible with Dungeon Crawl Classics RPG.

| Number | Title | Levels | Author(s) | Publication Date | Notes |
|---|---|---|---|---|---|
| GMGP2004D | Boston Crawl | 5 | Brendan J. LaSalle | 2015 | |
| GMGP1008D | Dungeonbattle Brooklyn | 1 | Brendan J. LaSalle | 2015 | |
| GMGP2006 | Louisiana Rising | 3 | Brendan J. LaSalle & George "Loki" Williams | 2016 | Proceeds benefited Louisiana flood victims |
| GMG2005D | Anaheim Crawl | 4 | Brendan J. LaSalle | 2016 | |
| GMG52017 | New Year's Evil | 2 | Brendan J. LaSalle | 2017 | 2017 Holiday Module |
| 0 | Murder Mountain Smackdown | 0 | Brendan J. LaSalle | | |
| 1 | The Crawl Formerly Known as Terror on the Tundra | 1 | Julian Bernick | | |
| 2 | Tropicrawl Cataclysm | 2 | James Spahn | | |
| 3 | Please Xcrawl! Don't Hurt 'Em | 3 | Brendan J. LaSalle | | |
| 4 | Death in the Dungeon of Tomorrow | 4 | Brendan J. LaSalle | | |
| 5 | Bay City Firestorm | 5 | Brendan J. LaSalle | | |
| 6 | Dooms 2 Go | Various | Brendan J. LaSalle and others | | Adventure compendium |
