= Kathlyn =

Other names
- Related names: Kathleen

Kathlyn is a feminine given name. Notable people with the name include:

- Kathlyn Curtis (born 1963), Canadian judge
- Kathlyn Gilliam (1930–2011), American civil rights activist
- Kathlyn Kelly (1919–2006), American athlete
- Kathlyn Ragg (born 1962), Fijian cyclist
- Kathlyn Williams (1879–1960), American actress

== See also ==
- The Adventures of Kathlyn, 1913 film
- Kathleen (given name)
- Kathryn (name)
