= Kertész =

Kertész, Kertesz, Kertes
Origin
- Language: Hungarian language
- Meaning: Gardener
- Region of origin: Hungary

Other names
- Variant forms: Gärtner (Gaertner, Gertner, Gartner), Gardner, Gardiner, Gradnik (Slovene)

Kertész is a Hungarian occupational surname, which means gardener, derived from kert and kertez ("garden"). Alternative spellings include Kertesz and Kertes. The surname may refer to:

- Adolf Kertész (1892–1920), Hungarian footballer
- Alice Kertész (born 1935), Hungarian gymnast
- Amir Kertes (born 1975), Israeli musician
- André Kertész (1894–1985), Hungarian photographer
- Daniella Kertesz (born 1989), Israeli actress
- Dezső Kertész (1892–1965), Hungarian actor
- Edith Kertész-Gabry (1927–2012), Hungarian singer
- Géza Kertész (1894–1945), Hungarian football player and manager
- Gyula Kertész (1888–1982), Hungarian footballer
- Imre Kertész (1929–2016), Hungarian writer
- István Kertész (conductor) (1929–1973), Hungarian conductor
- István Kertész (diplomat) (1904–1986), Hungarian diplomat
- János Kertész (born 1965), Hungarian physicist
- Joseph Kertes (born 1951), Canadian writer
- Kálmán Kertész (1867–1922), Hungarian entomologist
- Manó Kertész Kaminer (Kertész Mihály) (1886–1962), birth name of Hungarian-American film director Michael Curtiz
- Mihalj Kertes (1947–2022), Serbian politician
- Tom Kertes (born 1973), American political activist
- Vilmos Kertész (1890–1962), Hungarian footballer
- Zoltan I. Kertesz (1903–1968), Hungarian food scientist

== See also ==
- Kertész (crater), a crater on Mercury
