= Thomas Curtis =

Thomas Curtis may refer to:

- Thomas Curtis (actor) (born 1991), American actor
- Thomas Curtis (athlete) (1870–1944), American athlete and Olympic gold medalist
- Sir Thomas Curtis (lord mayor) (died 1559), Lord Mayor of London
- Thomas B. Curtis (1911–1993), U.S. Representative from Missouri

== See also ==
- Tom Curtis (disambiguation)
- Tommy Curtis (1952–2021), American college basketball player
- Thomas Curteys, MP for Lostwithiel
- Thomas Quinn Curtiss (1915–2000), American writer
