= List of modules =

The following are lists of role-playing games modules:

- List of Dungeons & Dragons modules
- List of Eberron modules and sourcebooks
- List of Forgotten Realms modules and sourcebooks
- List of Dungeon Crawl Classics modules
- List of Dark Sun modules and sourcebooks
- List of Dragonlance modules and sourcebooks

== See also ==
- List of Apache modules, available for the Apache web server
- Comparison of 802.15.4 radio modules
