= István Kertész =

István Kertész may refer to:

- István Kertész (conductor) (1929–1973), Hungarian orchestral and operatic conductor
- István Kertész (diplomat) (1904–1986), Hungarian diplomat
