= Charles Curtis (disambiguation) =

Charles Curtis (1860–1936) was the 31st vice president of the United States.

Charles Curtis may also refer to:

- Charles Curtis (botanist) (1853–1928), English plant-collector
- Charles Curtis (musician), avant-garde American musician
- Charles Curtis (storekeeper) (1850–1923), New Zealand storekeeper and local politician
- Charles B. Curtis (born 1940), former chairman of the Federal Energy Regulatory Commission
- Charles Berwick Curtis (1795–1876), manufacturer of gunpowder
- Charles Clarence Curtis (1893–1960), American newspaper executive and military officer
- Charles David Curtis (born 1939), British geologist
- Charles Gordon Curtis (1860–1953), American engineer, turbine inventor, winner of the Rumford Prize
- Charles W. Curtis (1926–2026), American mathematician
- Chuck Curtis (1935–2016), American football coach
- Charlie Curtis (Australian footballer) (1878–1959), Australian rules footballer
- Charlie Curtis (footballer, born 1910) (1910–1985), English footballer

== See also ==
- Curtis, name
- Charles Curtiss (1908–1993), American communist
- Charles Dwight Curtiss (1887–1983), United States' Federal Highway Administration administrator
