= Human rights movement =

Activism in favor of human rights

Human rights movement refers to a nongovernmental social movement engaged in activism related to the issues of human rights. The foundations of the global human rights movement involve resistance to: colonialism, imperialism, slavery, racism, segregation, patriarchy, and oppression of indigenous peoples.

A key principle of the human rights movement is its appeal to universality: the idea that all human beings should struggle in solidarity for a common set of basic conditions that has to be followed by all.

== History ==
Human rights activism predates the 20th century, that includes the anti-slavery movement. Historical movements were usually concerned with a limited set of issues, and they were more local than global. One account identifies the 1899 Hague Convention as a starting point for the idea that humans have rights independent of the states that control them.

The activities of the International Federation for Human Rights (originally the International Labor Organization)—founded in France by the international labor movement in the 1920s—can be seen as a precursor to the modern movements. This organization was quickly embraced by the United States and European powers, perhaps as a way to counteract the Bolshevik call for global solidarity among workers.

=== Anti-colonialism ===
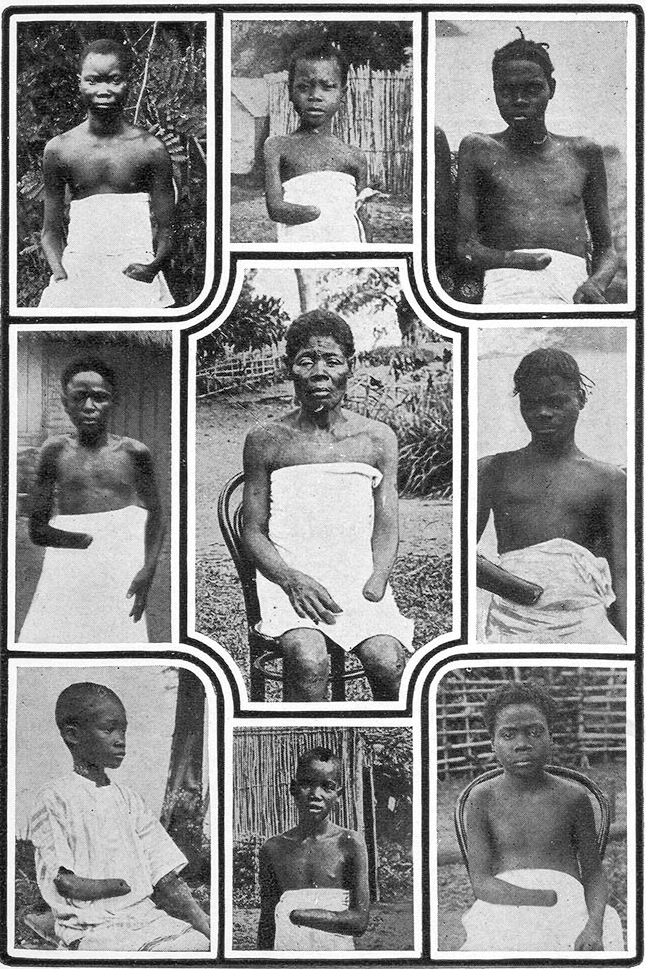
Human rights activists circulated images of mutilated Congolese children among concerned Europeans and Americans, pressuring the Belgium government to make political reforms

Another major global human rights movement grew out of resistance to colonialism. The Congo Reform Association, founded in 1904, has also been described as a foundational modern human rights movement. This group used photographs to document terror wrought by Belgians in the course of demanding rubber production in the Congo. These photographs were passed among sympathetic Europeans and Americans, including Edmund Morel, Joseph Conrad, and Mark Twain—who wrote satirically as King Leopold:

...oh well, the pictures get sneaked around everywhere, in spite of all we can do to ferret them out and suppress them. Ten thousand pulpits and ten thousand presses are saying the good word for me all the time and placidly and convincingly denying the mutilations. Then that trivial little kodak, that a child can carry in its pocket, gets up, uttering never a word, and knocks them dumb!

The photos and subsequent literature triggered international outrage at Belgian crimes committed against the Congolese.

As the century went on, African Americans including W. E. B. Du Bois, Walter White, and Paul Robeson joined with leaders of the African diaspora (from Haiti, Liberia, the Philippines, and elsewhere) to make a global demand for basic rights. Although the origins of this movement were multifaceted (owing strength both to the capitalist Marcus Garvey and to the more left-wing African Blood Brotherhood), a definitive moment of international solidarity came after Italy's annexation of Ethiopia in 1935.

=== World War II and the United Nations ===
In the aftermath of World War II, the Pan-Africanist contingent played a major role in causing the United Nations to explicitly protect "human rights" in its founding documents. Du Bois compared colonies across the world to ghettos in the United States and called for a world document affirming the human rights of all people.

Representatives of small countries (particularly from Latin America), as well as Du Bois and other activists, were unhappy with the version of human rights envisioned for the UN Charter at Dumbarton Oaks in 1944. Du Bois stated at the time that, evidently, "the only way to human equality is through the philanthropy of the masters". However, the US government supported powerful domestic organizations willing to promote its concept of human rights, such as the American Bar Association and the American Jewish Committee. These organizations won public approval of the United Nations and the human rights concept.

The concept of human rights was indeed built into United Nations with institutions such as the United Nations Commission on Human Rights and the Universal Declaration of Human Rights. Active diplomacy by Latin American countries was instrumental to the process of promoting these ideas and drafting relevant agreements. As a result of this pressure, more human rights language was adopted at the 1945 San Francisco Conference to create the UN Charter. Revelations about the Holocaust, followed by the Nuremberg Trials, also had a major influence on the movement, particularly among Jewish and Christian lobbying groups. Some NGOs represented the UN charter as a victory for the human rights movement, while other activists argued that it paid lipservice to human rights while basically serving the interests of the great powers.

Early in the Cold War, the "human rights" concept was used to promote the ideological agendas of the superpowers. The Soviet Union argued that Western powers had exploited people in colonized lands around the world. A large percentage of Soviet propaganda to the Third World centered on charges of racism and human rights violations. The United States countered with its own propaganda, describing its own society as free and the Soviet Union's as unfree. Human rights language became an international standard, which could be used by great powers or by people's movements to make demands.

=== Global human rights struggles ===
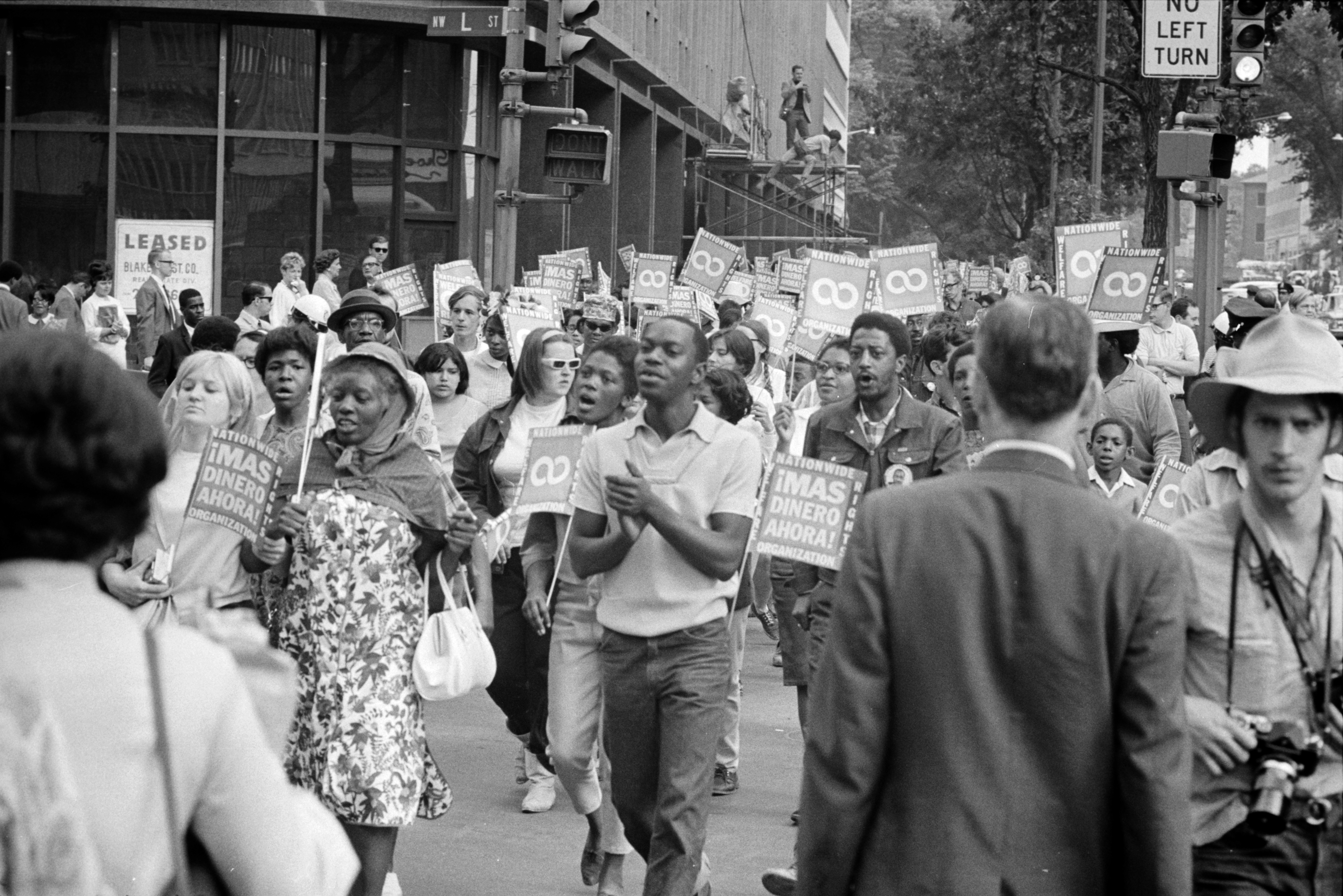
Poor People's Campaign March at Lafayette Park, 1968

Within the United States, participants in the civil rights movement called for human rights in addition to civil rights. Du Bois, the National Negro Congress (NNC), the NAACP, the Civil Rights Congress (CRC), and other activists, soon began charging the U.S. with human rights violations at the U.N. In 1951, Du Bois, William L. Patterson and the CRC presented a document called "We Charge Genocide", which accused the US of complicity with ongoing systematic violence against African Americans.

An Appeal for Human Rights, published by Atlanta students in 1960, is cited as a key moment in beginning the wave of nonviolent direct actions that swept the American South. In 1967, Martin Luther King Jr. began to argue that the concept of "civil rights" was laden with isolating, individualistic capitalist values. He said: "It is necessary for us to realize that we have moved from the era of civil rights to the era of human rights. When you deal with human rights you are not dealing with something clearly defined in the Constitution. They are rights that are clearly defined by the mandates of a humanitarian concern." For King, who began to organize the multi-racial Poor People's Campaign just weeks before his April 1968 assassination, human rights required economic justice in addition to de jure equality.

After the decolonization of Africa and of Asia, former colonies gained majority status in the UN's Commission on Human Rights, and focused their attention on global white supremacy and economic inequality—in doing so, choosing to admit other types of human rights abuses. Some of these nations argued that focusing on civil rights, as opposed to human rights, was a privilege available only to the wealthy nations that had benefited from colonialism. Demands for human rights in the Third World increased throughout the 1960s, even as the global superpowers turned their attentions elsewhere.

=== Changes in the 1970s ===
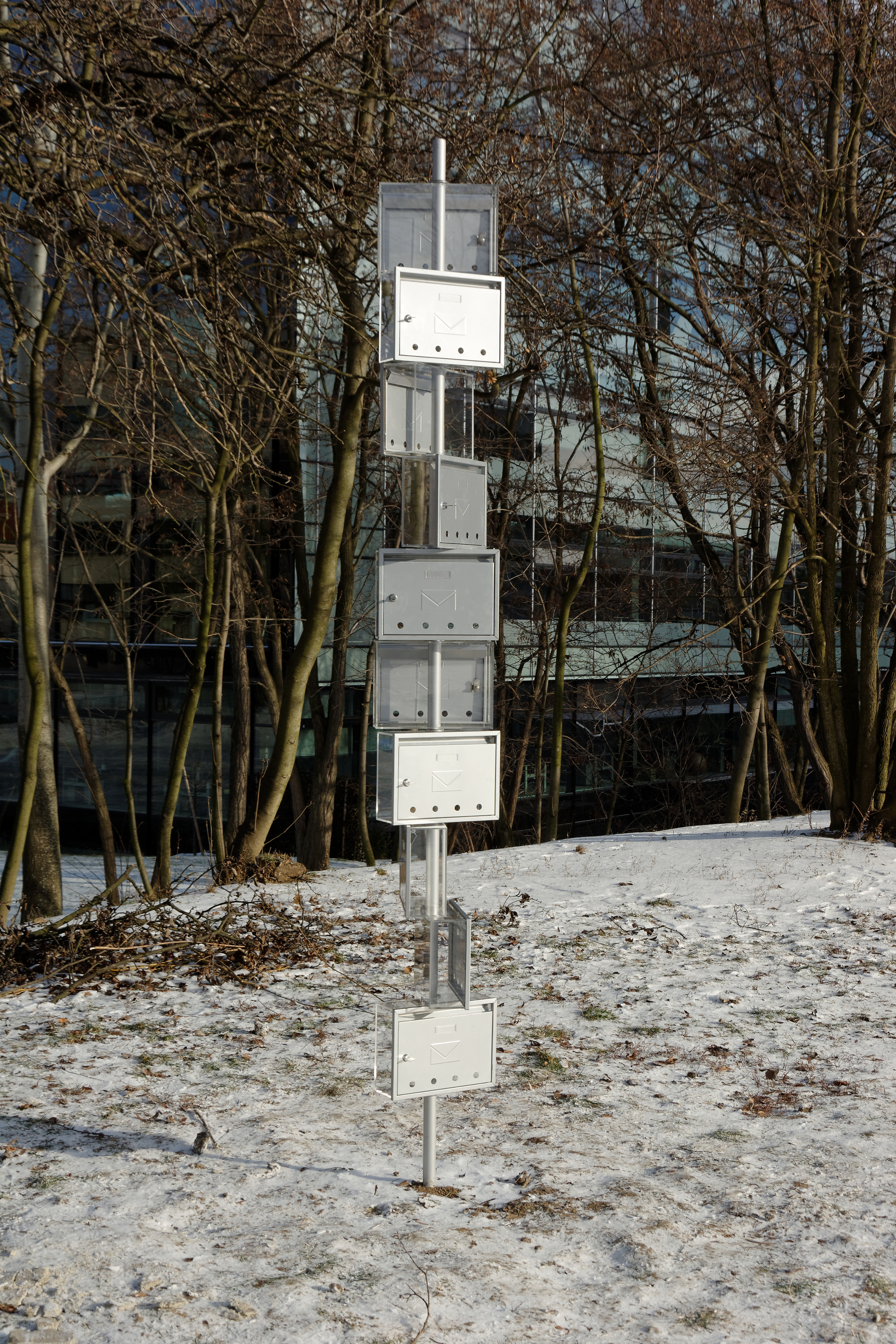
Charter 77 Memorial in Prague

Since the 1970s the human rights movement has played an increasingly important role on the international scene. Although government support for human rights decreased, international organizations increased in strength and number. Some of the events of the 1970s, which gave global prominence to the human movements issue, included the abuses of Chilean Augusto Pinochet's and American Richard Nixon's administrations; the signing of the Helsinki Accords (1975) between the West and the USSR; the Soweto riots in South Africa; the awarding of the Nobel Peace Prize to Amnesty International (1977); and the emergence of the Democracy Wall movement in China. Nixon was succeeded by the Jimmy Carter administration, much more supportive of the human rights issues. Even before Carter made human rights central to his foreign policy, progressives in Congress had institutionalized human rights in the State Department and passed legislation tying human rights to foreign aid considerations.

Pressure from the international human rights movement brought human rights increasingly to the political agendas of numerous countries and diplomatic negotiations. As the issue of human rights became important for dissidents in the Eastern Bloc (Soviet human rights movement, Charter 77, Workers' Defence Committee), this period also saw a growing reframing of the struggle between the West and USSR from the economic terms ("communism versus free market") into a struggle for human rights ("totalitarianism versus liberty"). Since the end of the Cold War, the issues of human rights have been present in a number of major political and military conflicts, debated by global public opinion, from Kosovo to Iraq, Afghanistan, the Congo and Darfur.

Originally, most international human rights organizations came from France and the UK; since the 1970s American organizations moved beyond rights for Americans to partake in the international scene, and around the turn of the century, as noted by Neier, "the movement became so global in character that it is no longer possible to ascribe leadership to any particular [national or regional] segment". However, others, like Bonny Ibhawoh, point out that there still is a gap between regions, particularly as most of the international human rights movement organizations are located in the global North, and thus continuous concerns are raised about their understanding of the situations in the global South.

=== Since the 1990s ===
The global human rights movement has become more expansive since the 1990s, including greater representation of women's rights and economic justice as part of the human rights umbrella. Economic, social and cultural (ESC) rights gained new prominence.

Advocates for women's human rights (sometimes identifying as part of the feminist movement), criticized the early human rights movement for focusing on male concerns and artificially excluding women's issues from the public sphere. Women's rights have nevertheless gained prominence in the international human rights movement, particularly insofar as they include protection from gender-based violence. In Latin America, the issue of women's human rights intersects with the struggle against authoritarian governments. In many cases, for example the Mothers of the Plaza de Mayo, women's groups were some of the most prominent advocates of human rights in general. Mainstream acceptance of women's human rights within the international human rights movement has increased since 1989.

The authority of the United Nations human rights framework diminished in the 1990s, partly due to the emphasis on economic liberalization that followed the Cold War.

The 1990s also saw a call to "defend the defenders" of human rights—to protect human rights activists from violence and repression. However, there has been an increase in the number of attacks on activists. The movement has come to a standstill as individuals continue to push for liberation but are unable to report their findings out of fear of harm or death. The number of female activists has been growing since the beginning of the feminist movement, however, there has been an increased number of attacks on women. In 2016, the Taliban targeted female activists to send a message.

The internet has expanded the power of the human rights movement by improving communication between activists in different physical locations. This is known as mediated mobilization. Individuals who are using their voices to communicate about the injustices are now able to communicate with like-minded people who use their voices through participatory journalism.

The human rights movement has historically focused on abuses by states, and some have argued that it has not attended closely enough to the actions of corporations. In the 1990s, some early steps were taken towards holding corporations accountable for human rights abuses. For example, the Parliament of the United Kingdom approved a resolution to censure BP for funding Colombian death squads. Organizations such as Human Rights Watch also began to pressure other nongovernmental organizations to take human rights into account. In 1993, Human Rights Watch successfully lobbied the International Olympic Committee to vote against awarding the 2000 Summer Olympics to Beijing because of China's human rights record.

== Issues and activities ==
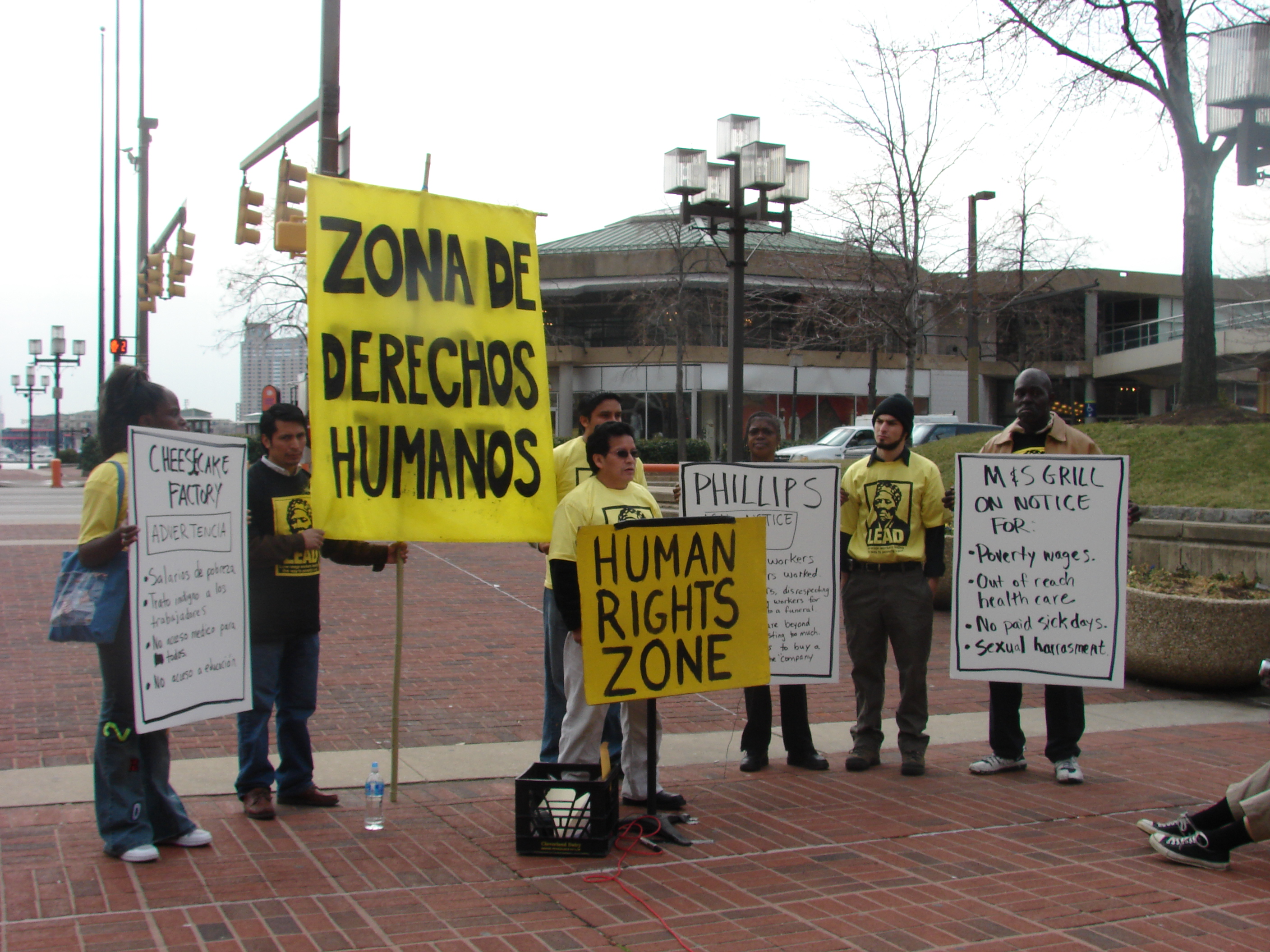
United Workers demonstrating for human rights and fair development in Baltimore's Inner Harbor.

The international human rights movement is concerned with issues such as deprivation of life and liberty, deprivation of the right of free and peaceful expressions, gatherings and worship, equal treatment regardless of individual background, and opposition to unjust and cruel practices such as torture. Other issues include opposition to the death penalty and to child labor.

Much of the human rights movement is local in nature, concerned with human rights violations in their own countries, but they rely on an international network of support. The international nature of the movement allows local activists to broadcast their concerns, sometimes generating international pressure on their home government. The movement generally espouses the principle that sovereignty ends where human rights begin. This principle justifies intervention across borders to rectify perceived violations.

The human rights movement is also credited with supplying local activists with a vocabulary to use in support of their claims.

== Limitations and criticism ==
One major schism within the international human rights movement has been between NGOs and activists from the First and Third Worlds. Critics of the mainstream movement have argued that it suffers from systemic biases and is unwilling to confront inequality on a global scale. In particular, some critique the role of neoliberal capitalism in creating economic conditions that engender "human rights violations", arguing that the dominant human rights movement is blind to these dynamics. Makau Mutua has written:

As currently constituted and deployed, the human rights movement will ultimately fail because it is perceived as an alien ideology in non-Western societies. The movement does not deeply resonate in the cultural fabrics of non-Western states, except among hypocritical elites steeped in Western ideas. In order ultimately to prevail, the human rights movement must be moored in the cultures of all peoples.

David Kennedy has criticized a tendency of the international human rights movement to "treat human rights as an object of devotion rather than calculation", arguing that human rights language is vague and may impede utilitarian assessments of a situation. Kennedy also argues that this vocabulary can be "misused, distorted, or co-opted", and that framing issues in terms of human rights may narrow the field of possibility and exclude other narratives. Others have also critiqued the movement and its language as vague.

Some have argued that the human rights movement has a tendency to subtly debase people by portraying them as victims of abuse. However, others have argued that this very argument is used in order to downplay human rights abuses.

== Organizations ==
Particularly since the 1970s, the international human rights movement has been mediated by NGOs.

Major international human rights organizations include Amnesty International and Human Rights Watch. The International Human Rights Arts Movement cannot claim to be a major organization, although it is significant both for its international participation and in that it seeks to highlight human rights issues through the promotion of the arts.

Historically, the influence of the International Federation for Human Rights is seen as highly important to the movement.

The creation of the International Criminal Court at the turn of the 21st century is seen as another achievement of international human rights activists.

== See also ==
- Revolutionary movement
