= David Curtiss =

David Curtiss may refer to:

- David Raymond Curtiss (1878-1953), American mathematician
- David Curtiss (swimmer) (born 2002), American swimmer
- Dave Curtiss, British musician, half of Curtiss Maldoon

== See also ==
- David Curtis (disambiguation)
