= Michael Curtis =

Michael Curtis may refer to:

- Michael Curtis (journalist) (1920–2004), British newspaper editor and executive
- Michael Curtis (musician), musician and composer
- Michael Curtis (role playing game writer), role-playing game designer and writer
- Michael Curtis (soccer) (born 1975), American soccer player and coach
- Michael Curtis (TV producer), television producer and writer
- Mike Curtis (American football) (1943–2020), American football linebacker
- Mike Curtis (cricketer), New Zealand cricketer
- Mike Curtis (politician), American politician
- Mike Curtis (writer) (born 1953), American writer who scripts the Dick Tracy comic strip
- Mickey Curtis (born 1938), Japanese actor

== See also ==
- Michael Curtiz (1886–1962), Academy Award-winning Hungarian-American film director
