= Tom Curtis =

Tom Curtis may refer to:

- Tom Curtis (American football) (born 1947), American football player
- Tom Curtis (footballer) (born 1973), English soccer player
- Tom Curtis (rugby union) (born 2001), English rugby union player
- Burger King, president of operations regarding the US and Canada

== See also ==
- Tommy Curtis (1952–2021), American college basketball player
- Thomas Curtis (disambiguation)
