= Legends are Made, Not Born =

Dungeon Crawl Classics adventure by Chris Doyle

- Code: DCC# 0
- Rules required: d20 3.5
- Character levels: 0
- Campaign setting: Generic D&D
- Authors: Chris Doyle
- First published: 2003

Linked modules
- Dungeon Crawl Classics

Legends are Made, Not Born is a d20 Dungeon Crawl Classics adventure written for Dungeons & Dragons by Chris Doyle. It is the first DCC to feature 0-level characters (player characters with 1 level in a non-player character class). The module was later released as #0 in an E-book collection of classics developed by Goodman Games.

== Plot ==
In the town of Dundraville, the villagers have long endured the demands of an ogre who dwells in a nearby cave. At first, they placated the ogre with offerings of ale and supplies, hoping to avoid his wrath. But the ogre's greed has grown darker—he now demands gold, building materials, and even human captives. With no heroes to defend them, the townsfolk face a choice. Six ordinary villagers resolve to confront the monster themselves. Their fate and their neighbors' safety rests on whether these champions can overcome the ogre in his lair before more lives are lost.
