= Curtice =

Curtice is a surname. Notable people with the surname include:

- Harlow Curtice (1893–1962), American auto industry executive
- Jack Curtice (1907–1982), American football coach and college athletics administrator
- John Curtice (born 1953), British political scientist

== See also ==
- Curtice, Ohio
- Curtis
