= Idylls of the Rat King =

Dungeon Crawl Classics adventure

- Code: DCC# 1
- Rules required: d20 3.5
- Character levels: 1 - 3
- Campaign setting: Generic D&D
- Authors: Jeffrey Quinn
- First published: 2003

Linked modules
- Dungeon Crawl Classics

Idylls of the Rat King is a d20 Dungeon Crawl Classics adventure written for Dungeons & Dragons by Jeffrey Quinn. For character levels 1-3, DCC #1 pits PCs against a wererat king and his wicked minions. As of 2006, Idylls of the Rat King has been reprinted three times. The 3rd printing features the art of classic TSR artist, Jim Holloway. The title is a reference to Idylls of the King, a cycle of narrative poems by Alfred Tennyson.

== Plot ==
In Idylls of the Rat King, goblin bandits have taken up residence in an abandoned mine northwest of Silverton. Someone must get rid of them. But this is no ordinary abandoned mine. It was deliberately barricaded generations ago when the Gannu family, founders of Silverton, discovered an unspeakable evil on its lowest levels. And these are no ordinary goblins, for the curse of the Gannu family courses through their veins.

== Publication history ==
Idylls of the Rat King (2003) was the first adventure in the "Dungeon Crawl Classics" line of d20 adventures from Goodman Games.

== Reviews ==
- Pyramid

== Awards ==
DCC #1 received an Honorable Mention for Best Adventure, ENnies 2003.
