= Dungeon Crawl Classics =

Role-playing game published using the Open Game License

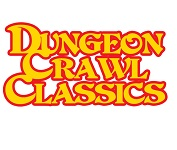
- Designers: Joseph Goodman
- Publishers: Goodman Games
- Publication: 2012– (9th printing in 2021)
- Genres: Heroic fantasy, sword and sorcery, science fantasy
- Systems: Customized d20

Dungeon Crawl Classics
- Designers: Several
- Publishers: Goodman Games
- Publication: 2003–
- Genres: Heroic fantasy, sword and sorcery, science fantasy
- Systems: d20 system (3rd Edition D&D), Game System License (4th Edition D&D), Original Adventures Reincarnated (Advanced Dungeons & Dragons), others

Dungeon Crawl Classics Role Playing Game (DCC RPG or simply DCC) is a role-playing game published by Goodman Games using the Open Game License (OGL) and System Reference Document (SRD) version 3.5 to provide legal compatibility with the revised third edition of Dungeons & Dragons.

Dungeon Crawl Classics is also the label of an earlier series of role-playing game modules for the d20 System, that is compatible with the 3rd edition of the Dungeons & Dragons ruleset. This line continued with modules for the 4th edition D&D ruleset before Goodman Games in 2012 switched over to their in-house ruleset, also called Dungeon Crawl Classics. The series includes more than 100 adventures and features game designers such as Michael Mearls, Dave Arneson, and Monte Cook, as well as former TSR artists including Jeff Dee, Erol Otus, Jim Roslof, and Jim Holloway. The DCC series harks back to 1st edition Advanced Dungeons & Dragons modules in content and style.

== Dungeon Crawl Classics ethos ==
The design ethos is summed up by the following statement included in every DCC module, regardless of which underlying ruleset it is written for:

"Remember the good old days, when adventures were underground, NPCs were there to be killed, and the finale of every dungeon was the dragon on the 20th level? Those days are back. Dungeon Crawl Classics don't waste your time with long-winded speeches, weird campaign settings, or NPCs who aren't meant to be killed. Each adventure is 100% good, solid dungeon crawl, with the monsters you know, the traps you fear, and the secret doors you know are there somewhere."

== History ==
In 2012 Goodman Games released the Dungeon Crawl Classics Role Playing Game. The company describes it as "an OGL system that cross-breeds Appendix N with a streamlined version of 3E", referring to Appendix N of the original Dungeon Masters Guide, which listed fiction that was an influence on Dungeons & Dragons. The DCC module series migrated to the new system in 2012 with the release of module 66.5, Doom of the Savage Kings by Harley Stroh.

The game requires the Zocchi dice set, meaning the d3, d5, d7, d14, d16, d24 and d30 dice are required in addition to the standard set of 7 polyhedrals (d4, d6, d8, d10, d12 and d20).

Third party publishers also publish material for use in the DCC RPG under license from Goodman Games.

== The Dungeon Crawl Classics series of D&D modules ==
The series began in 2003 with the publication of Idylls of the Rat King for D&D 3rd edition, and continued to publish well over sixty adventures. In 2008, using the Game System License, the series changed to D&D 4th edition. The series switched to the DCC RPG upon the new system's release in 2012.

Some adventures are also available (under the Original Adventures Reincarnated label) in an Advanced Dungeons & Dragons 1st edition version as well as 3rd edition. Some have also been converted to Castles & Crusades.

== Reception ==
In his 2023 book Monsters, Aliens, and Holes in the Ground, RPG historian Stu Horvath referred to Mathew Finch's "Four Pillars of OSR", especially the fourth pillar that advises gamemasters to throw out the idea of balance between the abilities of players and monsters. "Dungeon Crawl Classics doesn't just dismiss balance, it nukes balance from orbit and wages a relentless war on the straggling survivors. Randomness rules here." Horvath concluded, "If players want a game that encourages character envelopment, sprawling stories, or rewarding exploration, look elsewhere. Longevity isn't the point — short campaigns and glorious, improbable deaths are. DCC is about grabbing that old stick of dynamite, shaking it vigorously, and laughing maniacally while waiting to see if it explodes."

== See also ==
- List of Dungeon Crawl Classics modules
