= David Curtis =

Dave or David Curtis may refer to:

- Dave Curtis (born 1946), American sailor
- David Curtis (rugby union) (born 1965), Irish rugby union international
- David L. Curtis (born 1947), American politician in the North Carolina Senate
- David Roderick Curtis (1927–2017), Australian scientist
- David Whitney Curtis (1833–1897), American politician
- Hillman Curtis (David Hillman Curtis, 1961–2012), American new media designer, author, musician and filmmaker

== See also ==
- David Curtiss (disambiguation)
