= Leon Curtiss =

American politician

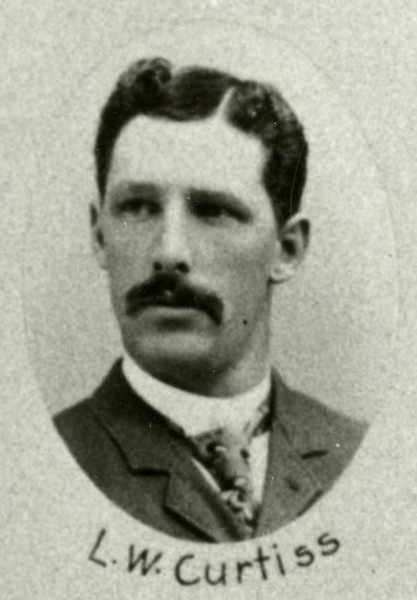
- Curtiss in 1895

Member of the Washington House of Representatives for the 20th district
- In office 1895–1897; 1899–1901

Personal details
- Born: Leon William Curtiss; March 4, 1861 Klickitat County, Washington, United States
- Died: October 18, 1934 (aged 73) The Dalles, Oregon, United States
- Party: Republican

Leon W. Curtiss (March 4, 1861 – October 18, 1934) was an American politician in the state of Washington. He served in the Washington House of Representatives.
