= Gertner =

Gertner is a surname. Notable people with the surname include:

- Ala Gertner (1912–1945), jewish prisoner in Auschwitz, participated in the Sonderkommando revolt in 1944
- Joel Gertner (born 1975), American professional wrestling announcer and manager
- Johan Vilhelm Gertner (1818–1871), Danish painter
- Nancy Gertner (born 1946), United States federal judge
- Paul Gertner, American magician
- Shloime Gertner, English Hasidic Jewish singer
