= Ralph Hamilton Curtiss =

- Born: 8 February 1880
- Died: 25 December 1929 (aged 49)
- Education: University of California
- Scientific career
- Fields: Astronomy
- Workplaces: University of Michigan

Ralph Hamilton Curtiss (8 February 1880 – 25 December 1929) was an American astronomer and a professor of astrophysics at the University of Michigan. His main work was on stellar spectra and the identification of spectral binaries as well as quantitative studies based on the stellar spectra to study their atmospheres.

Curtiss was born in Derby, Connecticut where his parents Hamilton Burton and Emily Wheeler were Puritans. He was the youngest of three sons, a brother being David Raymond Curtiss. The children grew up in Redlands, California after the family moved there in 1892 and Ralph entered the University of California in 1897. He was inspired into physics by E.P. Lewis and into astronomy by A. O. Leuschner. He became an assistant at the Student's astronomical observatory and in 1901 made a trip as part of the Lick Observatory team to Padang, Sumatra to observe the solar eclipse of May 18 during which time he received his BS degree in absentia. He then received a Lick Observatory fellowship and continued studies towards his doctorate. He studied the Cepheid variable W Sagittarii and examined techniques to determine radial velocity from spectrometric data. His thesis was "Proposed Method for the Measurement and Reduction of Spectrograms for the Determination of the RadiaI Velocities of Celestial Objects. Application to a Study of the Variable Star W Sagittarii" and he received his doctorate in 1905. He joined the Allegheny Observatory in 1905, working with Frank Schlesinger and moved to the University of Michigan in 1907 where he became assistant professor of astrophysics. In 1918 he became a full professor and in 1927 he succeeded William Hussey, upon his death, as director of the Observatory of the University of Michigan. During World War I, he was involved in training soldiers on navigation. He confirmed a third component to the star Algol based on spectra.

He also took an interest in fishing, golf and music and had been married to Marie Louise Welton from 1920. He died from an embolism after suffering briefly from pleurisy.
