= Kathlyn Joy Gilliam Collegiate Academy =

Location
- 1700 East Camp Wisdom; Dallas, Texas 75241; United States
- Coordinates: 32.662758°N 96.794900°W

Information
- Type: Public high school
- Principal: Gayle Ferguson Rodgers
- Faculty: 19
- Grades: 9-12
- Enrollment: 337 (2023-2024)
- Website: Official Website

Kathlyn Joy Gilliam Collegiate Academy is an advanced high school focusing on college readiness and is located on the grounds of the University of North Texas at Dallas in southern Dallas, Texas. It is a part of the Dallas Independent School District.

The school was named after Kathlyn Joy Gilliam, the first African-American woman who served on the Dallas ISD school board and the first African-American to serve as the president of the Dallas ISD board.

Prior to relocating to its current building, Gilliam was housed in the Nolan Estes Plaza. Construction of the current campus began in June 2010. The current campus opened in the fall of 2011.

== Architecture ==
The $21.5 million facility is located on the northeastern edge of the University of North Texas at Dallas campus. The 111,000-square-foot (10,300 m^{2}) campus can hold up to 400 students. The architect was SHW Group.

The main building houses an atrium, which includes a commons, a dining area, and the "perch," an elevated area that consists of European cement-board panels. 25 classrooms are located on the north side of the campus atrium. The skyline of Dallas is visible from the classroom windows.

The campus has a wireless building that includes two computer labs, a combined lecture hall and theater, an amphitheater, and the "Go Center," a resource center staffed by UNT Dallas students that exists to assist Gilliam students with college and university applications and scholarship applications.

The ceiling, in an undulating shape, is metal. The campus has a stage wall that opens to allow viewing from an outdoor amphitheater. The bathrooms include Italian marble.

Kathlyn Gilliam, the namesake of the school, reviewed the architectural plans.

The previous campus was at Nolan Estes Plaza, on Interstate 35 East. The previous campus had few windows and many staircases.
