= David Raymond Curtiss =

American mathematician

- Born: January 12, 1878; Derby, Connecticut, US
- Died: April 29, 1953 (aged 75); Redlands, California, US
- Education: University of California; Harvard University; École Normale Supérieure
- Known for: Trigonometry and analytic geometry
- Scientific career
- Fields: Mathematics
- Workplaces: Northwestern University
- Doctoral advisor: Maxime Bôcher; William Fogg Osgood

David Raymond Curtiss (January 12, 1878 – April 29, 1953) was an American mathematician. He served as president of the Mathematical Association of America from 1935 to 1936. He was also vice president of the American Mathematical Society and the American Association for the Advancement of Science.

== Life and career ==
Curtiss was born in Derby, Connecticut. He attended the University of California, earning a bachelor's degree in 1899 and a master's degree in 1901. He earned a doctorate at Harvard University under Maxime Bôcher and William Fogg Osgood in 1903. He completed a postdoctoral fellowship at École Normale Supérieure in 1904.

In 1904, Curtiss taught at Yale University for one year. He then served as a professor at Northwestern University from 1905 to 1943, including 20 years as Chair of the Mathematics Department. Curtiss authored textbooks on trigonometry and analytic geometry with Elton James Moulton. He also published the second Carus Mathematical Monograph, Analytic Functions of a Complex Variable.

His brother was astrophysicist Ralph Hamilton Curtiss. His son was computer pioneer John Hamilton Curtiss. He and his wife, who was seriously ill, committed suicide by carbon monoxide poisoning in the garage of their home in Redlands, California.
