= United Workers Association =

Human rights organization in Maryland, US

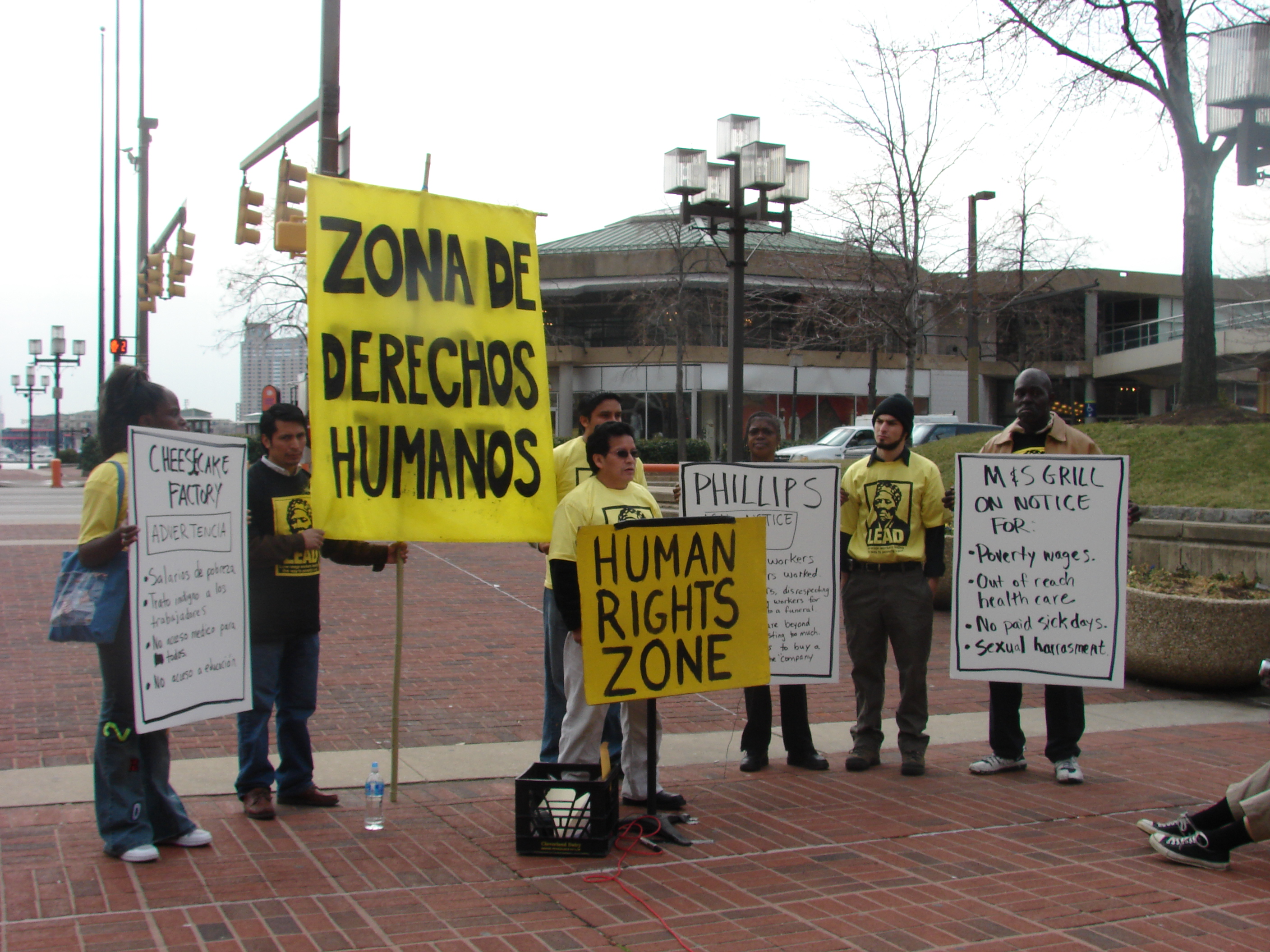
- Protest against poverty wages, 2009
- Established: 2002; 24 years ago
- Founded at: Camden Yards
- Type: Labor organization
- Headquarters: Baltimore, Maryland
- Methods: Community organizing, labor organizing
- Fields: Living wages & human rights
- Chair: Doreen Hicks
- Vice Chair: Rodette Jones
- Treasurer: Marilyn Julius
- Secretary: Michelle Rockwell
- Website: www.unitedworkers.org

The United Workers Association is a human rights organization led by low-wage workers in Maryland in the United States. The organization was founded in 2002 by a group of homeless men and women in Baltimore. In 2004 the United Workers Association launched a campaign to secure living wages at the Oriole Park at Camden Yards, targeting Baltimore Orioles team owner Peter Angelos by demanding that he pay cleaners a living wage.

In 2007 the United Workers Association won its demand for living wages at Camden Yards. On August 15, 2007, the organization announced that 11 workers and 4 allies would go on hunger strike starting September 3, 2007. Governor Martin O'Malley responded by announcing his support of living wages at the stadium, and on September 3, 2007, the hunger strike was postponed, pending an upcoming meeting of the Maryland Stadium Authority. On September 6, 2007, the Maryland Stadium Authority voted to pay cleaners the Maryland state living wage rate of $11.30 an hour, up from the current $7.00 an hour. Later that day the United Workers Association announced that the hunger strike was called off in response to the victory.

The organization has continued advocating for living wage and human rights issues in Maryland, targeting the waste incinerators, housing rights, mutual aid responses to the COVID-19 pandemic, equal access to healthcare and fair development in Baltimore.

== See also ==
- Tom Kertes
