= Harley Stroh =

American designer

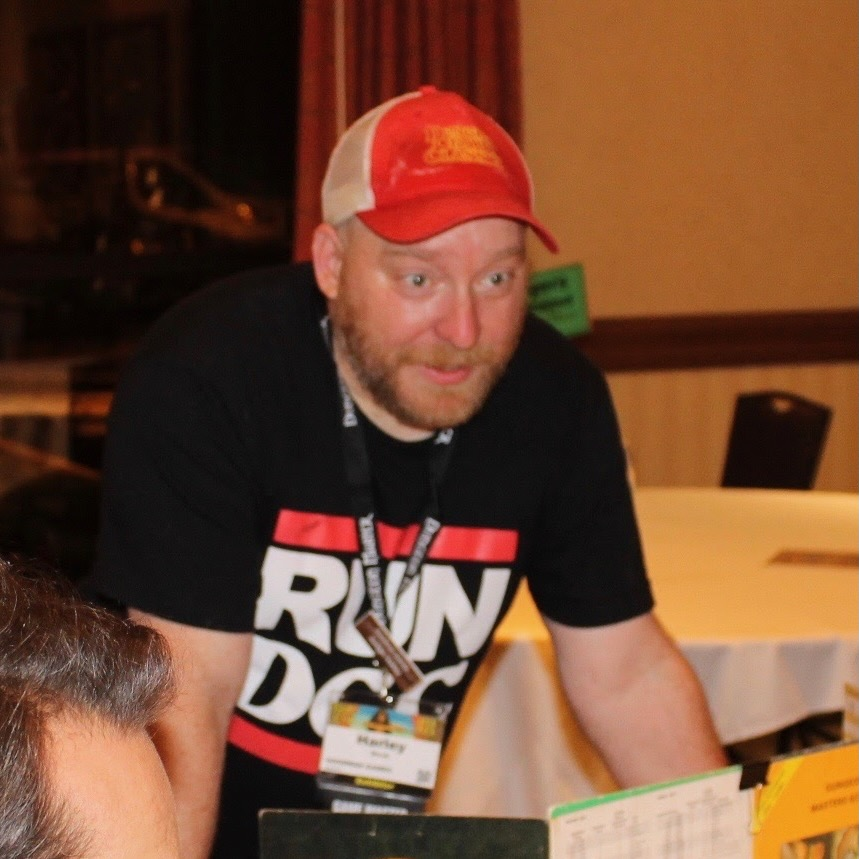
- Occupation: Game designer

Harley Stroh is a game designer who has worked primarily on role-playing games.

== Career ==
Harley Stroh is a long-time author working for Goodman Games, and later becoming the Dungeon Crawl Classics Line editor. Stroh authored Sellswords of Punjar, the first product from Goodman Games produced without using the Game System License after the release of Dungeons & Dragons fourth edition. Stroh designed Dragora's Dungeon (2008) and Curse of the Kingspire (2009), the only two releases in the Master Dungeons line for fourth edition D&D. Stroh wrote Death Dealer: Shadows of Mirahan (2010) which presented a campaign setting based on a character created by Frank Frazetta.
