= Luke Johnson (game designer) =

American game designer

- Occupation: Game designer

Luke Johnson is an American game designer who has worked primarily on role-playing games.

== Career ==
Luke Johnson designed Temple of Blood (2007), the first adventure in the "Wicked Fantasy Factory" series of adventures from Goodman Games; Temple of Blood was one of the company's three offerings at the inaugural Free RPG Day.

His D&D design work includes Player's Guide to Eberron (2006), Player's Handbook II (2006), Monster Manual V (2007), Eberron Player's Guide (2009), and The Plane Below (2009).
