= Tom Kertes =

Tom Kertes (born January 4, 1973) is an American-born Canadian human rights activist.

== Notability ==
Tom Kertes was media strategist for the United Workers Association's successful living wages campaign at Camden Yards. The association claimed that workers at Camden Yards were paid less than the state and federal minimum wage . For over three years the United Workers Association fought to secure living wages at the stadium . On September 6, 2007, the Maryland Stadium Authority voted to pay cleaners the Maryland living wage rate of $11.30 per hour. Adoption of the living wage policy occurred days after a scheduled hunger strike of 11 workers and 4 allies had been postponed , following positive remarks by Maryland Governor Martin O'Malley .

Tom Kertes worked with the United Workers Association as a volunteer advisor starting in 2003, as communications organizer in 2006 and as a consultant in 2007.

== Background ==
Tom Kertes has worked with the poor people's economic human rights movement since 2002. He has worked with the University of the Poor's School of Labor, which is part of the Poor People's Economic Human Rights Campaign. Tom Kertes has also worked with Friends and Residents, an organization of public housing residents in Washington, D.C. fighting HOPE VI development of their neighborhood. Starting in 2003 he worked with the United Workers Association, an organization of low-wage workers in Maryland.

Prior to his work with the Poor People's Economic Human Rights Campaign, Tom Kertes owned Children's Garden, a children's book and toy store in Silverdale, Washington. The store closed in 2001 due to losses after snow melt from a snow storm damaged over $200,000 in inventory.

== Current work ==
In 2012 Tom Kertes helped launch the Campaign for Child Care Equity at UBC as a grassroots organizer and a union member of BCGEU Local 303 . The campaign seeks to achieve gender pay equity for the early childhood educators employed by UBC . He is also an organizer with Liberation Learning , an organization of child care workers in British Columbia .

In 2009 Tom Kertes moved to Vancouver, British Columbia, Canada where he currently works as a community organizer in the child care sector .

In 2007 Tom Kertes moved to Toronto, Ontario, Canada, in response to human rights violations by the United States government and so that he could live in a country where marriage between same-sex couples is recognized . He became a Canadian citizen in 2014 and is a dual citizen of the United States and Canada .

Tom Kertes was Policy and Communications Advisor to the College of Early Childhood Educators in Ontario, Canada's first self-regulatory organization for early childhood educators .
