= Michael Curtis (soccer) =

American soccer player and coach

Personal information
- Date of birth: March 29, 1975 (age 51)
- Place of birth: Dallas, Texas, United States
- Height: 5 ft 10 in (1.78 m)
- Position: Defender

Youth career
- 1994–1995: Naval Academy
- 1996–1997: Dallas Baptist University

Senior career*
Years	Team	Apps	(Gls)
1996–1997	Mesquite Kickers		
1999–2004	Dallas Sidekicks (indoor)	45	(0)
2005	Dallas Roma		

Managerial career
- 2005–: DFW Tornados (assistant)
- * Club domestic league appearances and goals

Michael Curtis (born March 29, 1975) is an American retired soccer defender who played in the World Indoor Soccer League, Major Indoor Soccer League and USISL. He currently coaches with DFW Tornados.

== Player ==
Curtis attended Bryan Adams High School before entering the U.S. Naval Academy. He played two seasons at Annapolis before transferring to Dallas Baptist University for his junior and senior seasons. While at Annapolis, he tied for the Patriot League single game assists record with four in an October 20, 1995 game with West Point. He spent one season with the Mesquite Kickers in the USISL before signing with the Dallas Sidekicks in 1999. Curtis and his teammates played two seasons in the World Indoor Soccer League before moving to the second Major Indoor Soccer League in 2002. He left MISL when the Sidekicks folded following the 2003–2004 season. In 2005, he played for the USASA team Dallas Roma when it went to the second round of the U.S. Open Cup

== Coach ==
In 2005, the DFW Tornados hired Curtis as an assistant coach.
