= Margaret Curtis (archaeologist) =

British teacher, archaeologist and megalith enthusiast

- Born: 1941
- Died: 26 March 2022 (aged 80–81)
- Occupation: Primary school teacher
- Known for: "the Queen of Callanish" - an authority on the Callanish standing stones, a historian, an archaeologist and primary school teacher.
- Awards: Recipient of British Archaeological Award (1978)

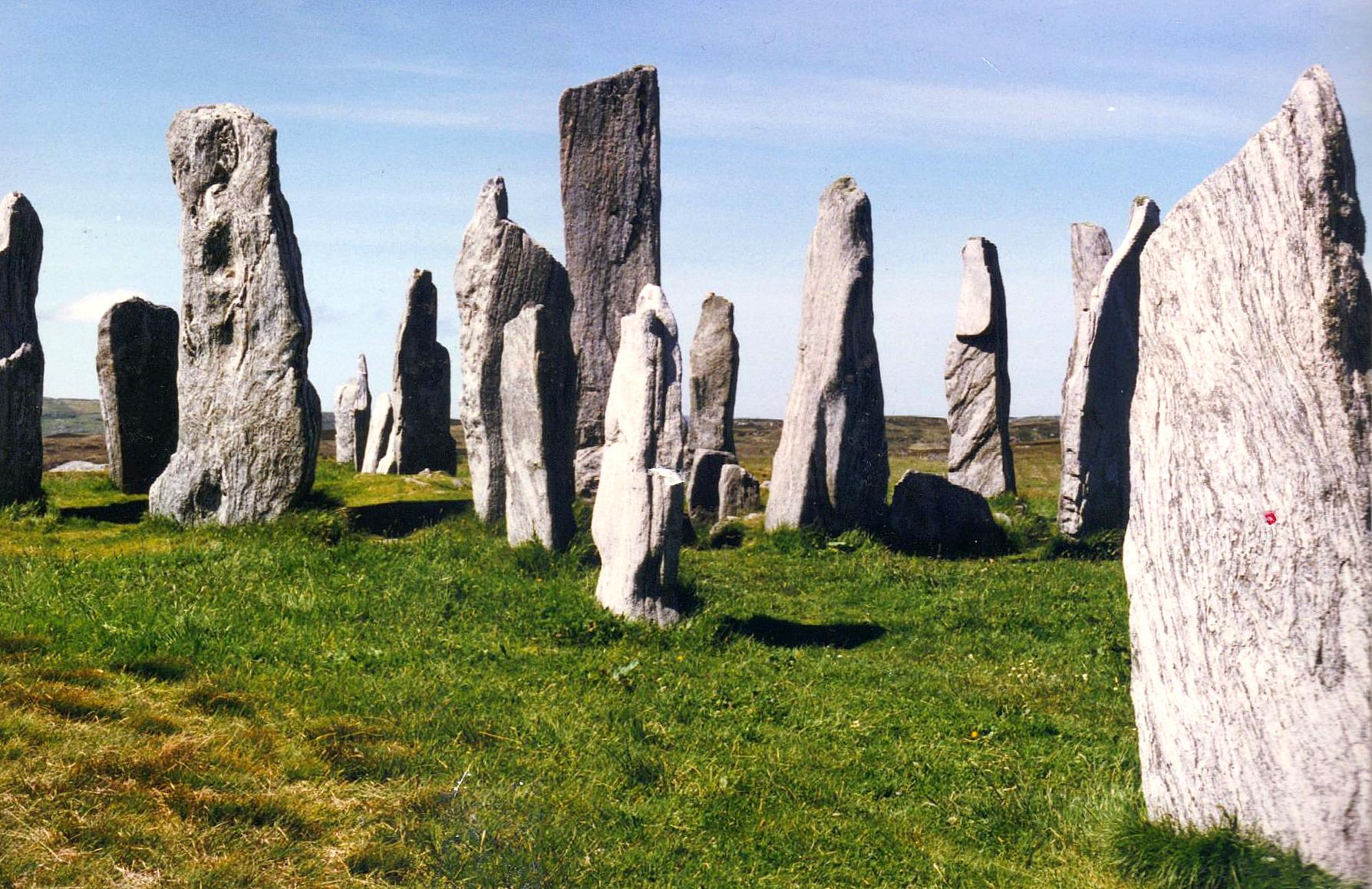
The Callanish Stones of the Isle of Lewis

Margaret Curtis (1941- 26 March 2022) was a teacher, archaeologist and megalith enthusiast who became known as "the Queen of Callanish" for her authority on the Callanish standing stones on the Isle of Lewis in Scotland.

== Biography ==
=== Early life ===
Born in 1941, Curtis was the adoptive daughter of Charles Woolford, a railway engineer, and his wife Doris, a teacher. She spent her early life in Edgbaston, and after completing her schooling, studied teaching at Maria Grey Training College, Twickenham. While working at a conservation camp in Anglesey, Curtis met Gerald Ponting, a trainee teacher. The couple married in 1967 and took up teaching jobs in Kesgrave, Suffolk. Later, in 1981, Curtis and Ponting self-published a book about the history of Kesgrave.

=== Death ===
Curtis died aged 80 years old, at Western Isles hospital on 26 March 2022.

== Personal life ==
Curtis had a son and a daughter, Benjamin and Rebecca, with her first husband Gerald Ponting.
