= Zelda Curtis =

British journalist (1923–2012)

- Born: December 1923; London, England
- Died: 31 January 2012 (aged 88)
- Occupation: Journalist
- Spouse: Gerry Curtis (m. 1943)
- Children: 2

Zelda Curtis (December 1923 – 31 January 2012) was a British journalist. She joined the Communist Party during the Second World War, and later worked for two news publications. Curtis left the Communist Party when her feminist views took priority and worked in various campaigns but later returned to local politics in 1981 where she established links with her local community. She was employed by the Women's Committee of the Greater London Council, and established the Association of Greater London Older Women. In her later life, Curtis wrote in papers, made broadcasts on women's rights and pensions, and taught public speaking techniques.

== Biography ==
=== Early life ===
Curtis was born in London in December 1923 to Eastern European Jewish immigrants Ada and Manny Brown. Her mother and aunt operated a millinery shop. Curtis was raised in Upper Street, Islington. When the Second World War broke out, she was evacuated to Somerset and came into contact with the Workers' Educational Association. The association helped to form her independent socialist outlook which had its origins from her father and led to Curtis being curious about miners collecting money on the streets during the 1926 General Strike. Curtis meet naval officer Gerry Curtis in 1943 and after the two began dating, they became involved in the running of the left-wing progressive Unity Theatre. The two married the following year and established residence in Finchley, where Curtis joined the Communist Party.

=== Career ===
Curtis was employed by Labour Monthly as the publications's managing editor, introducing a cultural section to the magazine, and gave her encouragement to young writers. In the 1960s and 1970s, Curtis worked at fundraising for the Morning Star, and had daily appeals placed on the paper's front page. She was drawn away from the Communist Party when her feminist views took priority: Curtis was active in the Campaign for Nuclear Disarmament and Anti-Apartheid, and worked with politician George Galloway in the War on Want charity. Curtis made a return to local community politics when she joined The East End News in 1981. It was with the paper that she established links with the community and developed the publication's feature department. The changes helped garner an increase in Curtis's popularity. She was employed by the Camden Task Force as a community development worker in 1982 and provided information to the Camden Pensioners and Trades Union Association.

Gerry died when she was 60 and Curtis was diagnosed with Parkinson's disease. She was co-opted as a member of the Women's Committee of the Greater London Council between 1984 and 1985, where her group was instructed to investigate the Council's Forum for the Elderly's attitude towards issues relating to women. Curtis became a paid employee of the Pensioner's Link in 1984 and established the Association of Greater London Older Women as well as serving on the Islington Women's Committee. She flew to the United States in 1995 to make a Channel 4 Documentary on the Grey Panther movement entitled People First: Grey Power, and conducted the final interview with the group's founder Maggie Kuhn. The programme was broadcast on the evening of 16 September 1995. Curtis wrote pamphlets and articles and frequently made broadcasts concerning women's rights and pensions.

=== Later life and death ===
Curtis taught public speaking techniques to Tanzania's Maasai warriors and edited the 1999 book Life After Work: Stories of Freedom, Opportunity and Change. In the early 2000s she met health and transport campaigner Stan Davison and the two began a relationship. Curtis participated in experimental treatments to help her deal with Parkinson's disease and trained older people to use media resources. As her disease advanced, she reduced her public appearances and preferred to work from home. Curtis died in London on 31 January 2012. She was survived by her two children, two grandchildren and two great-grandchildren. Her funeral was held on 8 February at Golders Green Crematorium.
