= Charlie Curtis (footballer, born 1910) =

English footballer

Personal information
- Full name: Charles Curtis
- Date of birth: 22 November 1910
- Place of birth: Sunderland, England
- Date of death: 1985 (aged 74–75)
- Position: Midfielder

Senior career*
Years	Team	Apps	(Gls)
1933–1934	Stoke City	0	(0)
1934–1936	Tranmere Rovers	21	(0)
1936	Boston United		
Total		21	(0)
- * Club domestic league appearances and goals

Charles Curtis (22 November 1910 – 1985) was a footballer who played in the Football League for Tranmere Rovers.

== Career ==
Curtis was born in Sunderland and began his career as an amateur with Stoke City playing for the reserve side in the Central League during the 1933–34 season. He left at the end of the campaign to turn professional with Third Division North side Tranmere Rovers. He spent two seasons with Rovers playing 28 times before leaving for non-league football.

== Career statistics ==
Appearances and goals by club, season and competition
Club	Season	League			FA Cup		Other		Total	
Club	Season	Division	Apps	Goals	Apps	Goals	Apps	Goals	Apps	Goals
Stoke City	1933–34	First Division	0	0	0	0	0	0	0	0
Tranmere Rovers	1934–35	Third Division North	12	0	0	0	1 (Note: Appearances in Third Division North Cup)	0	13	0
Tranmere Rovers	1935–36	Third Division North	9	0	4	0	2	0	15	0
Career total			21	0	4	0	3	0	28	0
