= Larry Curtiss =

American chemist and researcher

- Education: University of Wisconsin-Madison (BA), Carnegie-Mellon University (PhD)
- Occupation: Chemist
- Organization(s): Argonne National Laboratory, Joint Center for Energy Storage Research, the Center for Electrochemical Energy Science, American Association for the Advancement of Science
- Known for: Gaussian-n series, lithium-air batteries
- Awards: University of Chicago Distinguished Performance Award
- Website: www.anl.gov/profile/larry-a-curtiss

Larry A. Curtiss is an American chemist and researcher. He was born in Madison. WI. in 1947. He is a distinguished fellow and group leader of the Molecular Materials Group in the Materials Science Division at the U.S. Department of Energy's (DOE) Argonne National Laboratory. In addition, Curtiss is a senior investigator in the Joint Center for Energy Storage Research (JCESR), a DOE Energy Storage Hub, and was the deputy director of the Center for Electrochemical Energy Science, a DOE Energy Frontier Research Center.

Curtiss is a specialist in developing quantum chemical methods for accurate energy calculations and applying these methods to energy- and material-related problems, including those related to catalysis, batteries, and carbon materials. His work has been cited over 67,000 times.

Curtiss is a fellow of the American Association for the Advancement of Science.

== Early life and education ==
Curtiss received his bachelor's degree in chemistry from the University of Wisconsin-Madison in 1969. He then attended Carnegie-Mellon University, where he completed his master's in physical chemistry in 1971, and his Ph.D. in physical chemistry in 1973. While a graduate student, he worked under the supervision of pioneering chemist Sir John Anthony Pople, who won the Nobel Prize in chemistry for his work on computational methods in quantum chemistry. Curtiss's thesis focused on quantum chemical studies of hydrogen bonded complexes. After graduating in 1973, he became a research fellow at Battelle Memorial Institute in Columbus, Ohio until 1976.

Curtiss joined Argonne in 1976 as a research associate in Argonne's former Chemical Technology Division, where he rose through the ranks to become senior scientist in 1988. In 1998, Curtiss was appointed to his current position as senior scientist and group leader of the Molecular Materials Group within Argonne's Materials Science Division. From 2006 until 2009, he was also an acting group leader at the Center for Nanoscale Materials, and from 2004 until 2018, Curtiss was a senior fellow of the University of Chicago/Argonne Computation Institute. In 2000, Curtiss was named an Argonne Distinguished Fellow.

== Research ==
Developing and applying computational chemistry methods

Curtiss helped develop the Gaussian-n series of quantum chemical methods for accurate energy calculations (G1, G2, G3, and G4 theories). These methods are for calculating the thermochemical properties of molecules and ions.

Modeling lithium-ion batteries and beyond-lithium-ion batteries

Curtiss is also involved in developing so-called "beyond-lithium-ion" batteries, such as lithium-sulfur and lithium–air batteries. He helped create a Li-O_{2} battery that runs on lithium superoxide. Curtiss and researchers from Argonne and the University of Illinois also designed a lithium-air battery that works in a natural air environment for over 700 charge and discharge cycles, surpassing previous technology.

== Honors and awards ==
- Named a Distinguished Fellow of Argonne National Laboratory, 2000
- Elected a Fellow of the American Association for the Advancement of Science, 1997

== Select Recent Publications ==
- Accurate quantum chemical energies for 133000 organic molecules, B. Narayanan, P.C. Redfern, R.S. Assary, L.A. Curtiss, Chem. Sci., 10, 7449-7455 (2019). doi:10.1039/C9SC02834J
- Tuning the electrolyte network structure to invoke quasi-solid state sulfur conversion and suppress lithium dendrite formation in Li–S batteries, Q. Pang, A. Shyamsunder, B. Narayanan, C. Y. Kwok, L. A. Curtiss, L. F. Nazar, Nature Energy (2018) doi:10.1038/s41560-018-0214-0
- Lithium-Oxygen Batteries with Long Cycle Life in a Realistic Air Atmosphere, M. Asadi, B. Sayahpour, P. Abbasi, A. T. Ngo, K. Karis, J. R. Jokisaari, C. Liu, B. Narayanan, M. Gerard1, P. Yasaei, X. Hu, A. Mukherjee, K. C. Lau, R. S. Assary, F. Khalili-Araghi, R. F. Klie, L. A. Curtiss, Amin Salehi-Khojin1, Nature, 555, 502 (2018). DOI:10.1038/nature25984
- Perspective: Size selected clusters for catalysis and electrochemistry, A. Halder, L. A. Curtiss, A. Fortunelli, S. Vajda, J. Chem. Phys. 148, 110901 (2018).DOI: 10.1063/1.5020301
- The Role of Nanotechnology in the Development of Battery Materials for Electric Vehicles, J. Lu, Z. Chen, Z. Ma, F. Pan, L. A. Curtiss, K. Amine, Nature Nanotechnology 11, 1031–1038 (2016). DOI:10.1038/nnano.2016.207
- A Lithium-Oxygen Battery Based on Lithium Superoxide, J. Lu, Y. J. Lee, X. Luo, K. C. Lau, M. Asadi, H.-H. Wang, S. Brombosz, J. G. Wen, D. Zhai, Z. Chen, D. J. Miller, Y. S. Jeong, J.-B. Park, Z. Z. Fang, B. Kumar, A. Salehi-Khojin, Y.-K. Sun, L. A. Curtiss, K. Amine, Nature 2016, 529, 377. DOI:10.1038/nature16484
- Transition metal dichalcogenides as highly active catalysts for carbon dioxide reduction, Mohammad Asadi, Kibum Kim, Cong Liu, Aditya Venkata Addepalli, Pedram Abbasi, Poya Yasaei, Patrick Phillips, Amirhossein Behranginia, José M. Cerrato, Richard Haasch, Peter Zapol, Bijandra Kumar, Robert F. Klie, Jeremiah Abiade, Larry A. Curtiss, Amin Salehi-Khojin, Science, 353, 467-470 (2016). DOI: 10.1126/science.aaf4767

== Patents ==
- Lithium air batteries having ether-based electrolytes, (2016).
- Lithium-oxygen batteries incorporating lithium superoxide, (2017).
- Selective Oxidation of Propane to Propylene Oxide, (2019).
