= Edward Curtis (disambiguation) =

Edward S. Curtis (1868–1952) was an American photographer.

Edward Curtis may also refer to:

- Edward Curtis (politician) (1801–1856), U.S. Representative from New York
- Edward Curtis (athlete) (1899–1926), American Olympic athlete
- Ed Curtis (baseball) (1843–1914), American manager in Major League Baseball
- Edward B. Curtis (born 1933), American mathematician
- Edward C. Curtis (1865–1920), American politician
- Edward Peck Curtis (1897–1987), World War I ace

== See also ==
- Edward Curtis Smith (1854–1935), American politician
- Edward Curtis Wells (1910–1986), American businessman
- Edward Curtiss (1898–1970), American film editor
- Edmund Curtis (1881–1943), English-born Irish historian
