= Kathlyn Curtis =

Kathlyn Mary Curtis was appointed to the Provincial Court of Manitoba on March 1, 2001.

Curtis gained her law degree from the University of Manitoba in 1988. A period with the Prosecutions Branch was followed by her appointment as a magistrate. She presided over the summary conviction court, hearing guilty pleas and contested matters primarily related to highway traffic offences.

She has also worked as a probation officer, a juvenile counsellor at the Manitoba Youth Centre, a social worker and a cab driver.
