= Michael Curtis (role playing game writer) =

American writer and game designer

- Occupation: Game designer

Michael Curtis is a role-playing game designer and writer.

== Career ==
Curtis' best-selling game book “The Dungeon Alphabet” won the Three Castles Award in 2011, as well as entering a third printing with an expanded edition. Also known for his self-published mega-dungeon setting Stonehell Dungeon: Down Night-Haunted Halls (2009) and Stonehell Dungeon: Into the Heart of Hell (2014), Curtis's adventure writing style is greatly influenced by both the Old School Renaissance movement and his admitted love of the so-called "Appendix N" authors listed by Gary Gygax on page 224 of the 1st edition Advanced Dungeons & Dragons Dungeon Masters Guide - particularly the works of H. P. Lovecraft and Robert E. Howard.

=== Work ===
Writing credits include:

- Stonehell Dungeon: Down Night-Haunted Halls (2009), Author
- The Dungeon Alphabet (Goodman Games) (2011), Author
- Dungeon Crawl Classics Roleplaying Game (Goodman Games) (2012), Contributor
- Realms of Crawling Chaos (Goblinoid Games), Contributor
- Majus (Goblinoid Games) (2013), Author
- Dungeon Crawl Classics #73 Emirikol Was Framed! (Goodman Games) (2013), Author
- Dungeon Crawl Classics #75 The Sea Queen Escapes! (Goodman Games) (2013), Author
- Dungeon Crawl Classics #77 The Croaking Fane (Goodman Games) (2013), Author
- Dungeon Crawl Classics #79 Frozen in Time (Goodman Games) (2013), Author
- Dungeon Crawl Classics #80 Intrigue at the Court of Chaos (Goodman Games) (2013)
- Stonehell Dungeon: Into the Heart of Hell (2014)
- Dungeon Crawl Classics #97 The Queen of Elfland's Son (Goodman Games) (2018)

=== Awards ===
The Dungeon Alphabet - Three Castles Award 2011, North Texas RPG Con
