= István Kertész (diplomat) =

Hungarian diplomat (1904–1986)

Stephen Denis Kertesz
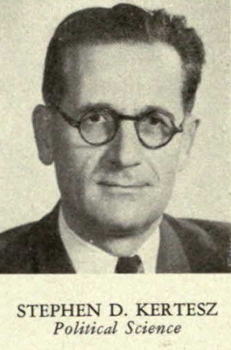
- Stephen D. Kertesz, circa 1952
- Born: István Kertész; 8 April 1904; Putnok, Hungary
- Died: 26 January 1986 (aged 81); South Bend, Indiana, USA
- Occupation: Diplomat
- Known for: Hungarian representative at the Paris Peace Conference

István Kertész (later known as Stephen Denis Kertesz) (April 8, 1904 – January 26, 1986) was a Hungarian diplomat who represented Hungary during the peace talks following World War II.

== Biography ==
He was born on April 8, 1904, in Putnok, Hungary, to Lajos and Mária (Stolcz) Kertesz. He received a Dr. Jur. from the University of Budapest in 1926, and a diploma from the Institut des Hautes Etudes Internationales in Paris in 1928. During the Second World War, worked in the Hungarian Ministry of Foreign Affairs, and in 1943-1944, made efforts to convey the intentions of Admiral Miklós Horthy to surrender to the Allied powers in order to avoid further damage to the country.

After the war, Kertész opposed the Soviet takeover of Hungary and tried to avert the Allied demand to expel the German minority from Hungary. In 1946, Kertész represented the Hungarian government at the Paris Peace Conference. In March–August 1947, he served as Ambassador in Italy.

In February 1948, he fled Hungary and emigrated to the United States, where he lectured on diplomacy and international relations.

== Works ==
- Stephen Kertesz, Diplomacy in a Whirlpool (Greenwood Press, London 1974, reprint of the 1953 edition)
- Stephen Kertesz, Diplomacy in a Changing World (Greenwood Press, London 1974, reprint of the 1959 edition)
- Stephen Kertesz, “The Expulsion of the Germans from Hungary: A Study in Postwar Diplomacy”, The Review of Politics, Vol. 15, no. 2 (April 1953) pp. 179–208
- Stephen Kertesz (ed.), Nuclear Non-Proliferation in a World of Nuclear Powers (Notre Dame, IN, 1967)
- Stephen Kertesz, The Last European Peace Conference, Paris 1946, Conflict of Values (Lanham, MD: University Press of America, 1985)
- Stephen Kertesz, Between Russia and the West: Hungary and the Illusions of Peacemaking, 1945-1947 (Notre Dame, Ind.: University of Notre Dame Press, 1984)
