= Tommy Curtis =

American basketball player (1952–2021)

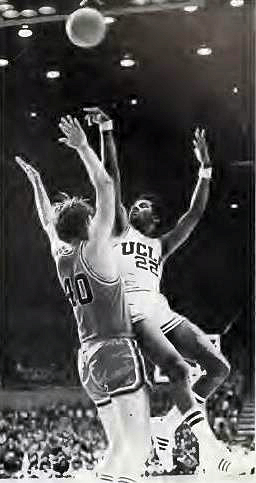
- Curtis (No. 22) with UCLA.

Personal information
- Born: January 8, 1952 Albion, Michigan, U.S.
- Died: August 3, 2021 (aged 69) Port St. Joe, Florida, U.S.
- Listed height: 5 ft 11 in (1.80 m)
- Listed weight: 170 lb (77 kg)

Career information
- High school: Leon (Tallahassee, Florida)
- College: UCLA (1971–1974)
- NBA draft: 1974: 7th round, 117th overall pick
- Drafted by: Buffalo Braves
- Position: Point guard
- Number: 22

Career highlights
- 2× NCAA champion (1972, 1973); Florida Prep/High School Player of the Year (1969); No. 33 retired by Leon High
- Stats at Basketball Reference

Thomas Lewis Curtis (January 8, 1952 – August 3, 2021) was an American college basketball player for the UCLA Bruins. He played on two undefeated national championship teams at UCLA. He did not lose a game in college until his final season, helping the school to a record 88-game consecutive win streak.

Curtis was the first African American to play basketball at his high school in Florida, where he was named the state's basketball player of the year in 1969. He left his home state of Florida to attend college at the University of California, Los Angeles (UCLA). A small but quick point guard, he helped the Bruins establish a national collegiate record of seven consecutive national titles under coach John Wooden.

After earning a Master of Business Administration (MBA) at UCLA, Curtis returned to Florida and worked for the state's Department of Commerce and later a Florida business council assisting minorities.

== Early life ==
Curtis was born in Albion, Michigan, into an affluent family, and grew up in Tampa, Florida. His mother, Johnye Rogers Curtis, was a social activist and a co-founder of the Florida chapter of the National Association for the Advancement of Colored People (NAACP). His father, Tom, played college football as a fullback for Florida A&M, and he later worked for Central Life Insurance Company. Tommy Curtis' maternal grandfather was the founder of the insurance company, which became one of the largest black-owned insurance companies in the country. After Curtis' parents divorced when he was eight, his mother became a professor at Florida State University, and his father went into the construction business in Albion.

Curtis was one of the first 50 black students to attend Leon High School in Tallahassee. He was the first black to play on Leon's basketball team, and he was named the state's Prep/High School Basketball Player of the Year in 1969, when he averaged 32 points per game. The school retired his No. 33 in 2015.

== College career ==
Curtis considered attending the University of Florida or Florida State, but his mother encouraged him to be independent and move away from home. His uncle in Compton, California, contacted UCLA about Curtis attending the school. Curtis earned a scholarship to UCLA, where he played basketball under Wooden. Curtis began at UCLA along with Larry Farmer on the freshman squad; players were not allowed to play varsity basketball their first year in college, a National Collegiate Athletic Association (NCAA) limitation at the time.

Curtis did not play his second year, having redshirted, as the Bruins won the national championship. He started playing varsity ball on the 1971–72 team, which also included first-year players Bill Walton, Keith Wilkes (later known as Jamaal Wilkes), and Greg Lee. UCLA again won the national championship that season, their sixth consecutive title. The Bruins outscored opponents by an NCAA-record 30.3 points per game during an undefeated 30–0 season, extending the school's winning streak to 45 consecutive games; UCLA had last lost in 1971 to Notre Dame.

Wooden started Lee over Curtis that season. Lee was bigger than the small, 5-foot-11-inch (1.80 m) Curtis, and he was more effective than Curtis at getting the ball into the high post and complementing Walton, who was also close friends with Lee. Wooden also believed Curtis would be more valuable providing a needed spark to the team off the bench, a role the coach did not believe Lee could fill.

Curtis played a large role with eight points and six assists in the championship game as UCLA defeated Florida State, 81–76. Wooden replaced Lee in the first half with the quicker Curtis, which, along with a strong performance by Walton, helped turn an early deficit into an 11-point halftime lead.

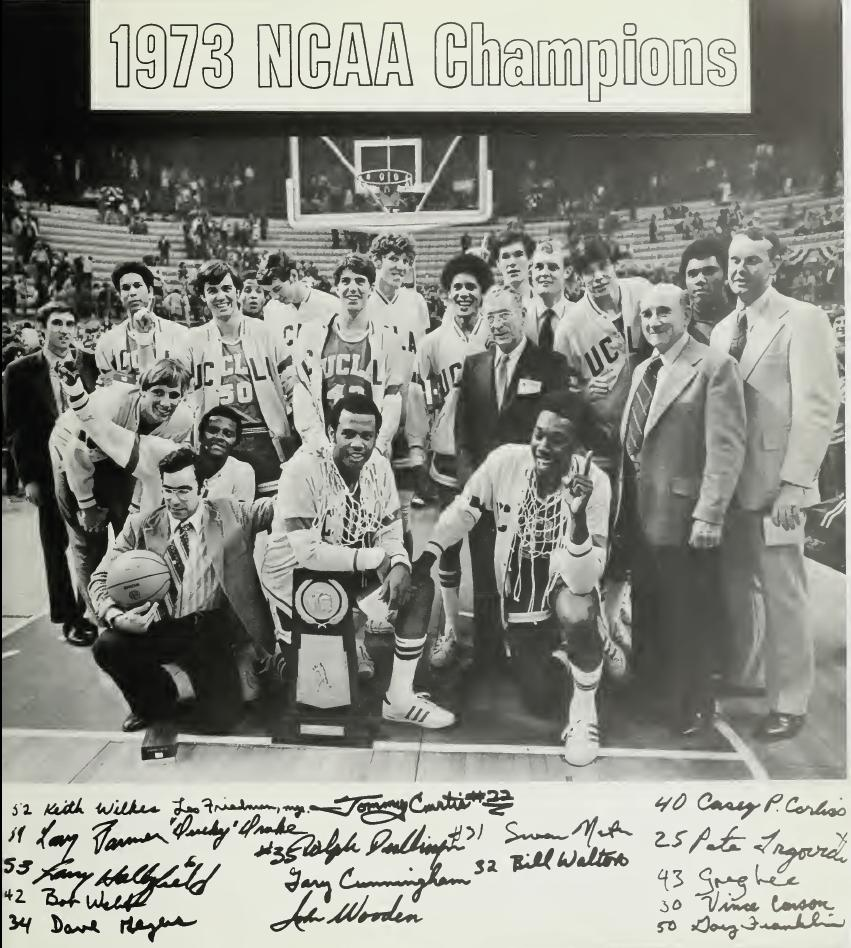
UCLA team after their seventh consecutive championship in 1973

Curtis continued a Wooden tradition of quick, strong-shooting, black point guards at UCLA, established earlier by Walt Hazzard, Lucius Allen, Mike Warren, and Henry Bibby. Wooden said he was best in a fast-paced running game and commended his defensive skills.

Curtis became a starter his junior year, beating out the incumbent, Lee. He started the first 10 games of the season before becoming ill with the London flu. He was out for two weeks, and his weight dropped from 170 to 153 pounds (77 to 69 kg). When he returned, Lee had re-established himself as the starter, and Curtis became a key reserve. He did not brood over his new role, and Wooden called him a good team player.

Curtis sparked the team with 12 points off the bench in a 54–39 win over San Francisco in the quarterfinals of the 1973 NCAA tournament. His play was cited by both Wooden and opposing coach Bob Gaillard as keys to the game's outcome. In the semifinals, he led the team in scoring with 22 points to help defeat Indiana 70–59. UCLA defeated Memphis, 87–66, to complete another perfect 30–0 season and win an NCAA-record seventh straight title. During the season, the Bruins eclipsed San Francisco's NCAA record of 60 consecutive victories, defeating Notre Dame for No. 61.

In his senior year, Curtis became a starter again. The Bruins started the season ranked No. 1 and won their first 13 games. On January 19, 1974, then-No. 2 Notre Dame ended UCLA's record 88-game win streak (Note: The Connecticut Huskies women's team broke UCLA's NCAA basketball record with 90 straight wins (2008–2010).) with a 71–70 victory in South Bend, Indiana. The Fighting Irish scored the final 12 points of the game as UCLA missed six straight shots and committed four turnovers, including two by Curtis. Curtis and Walton missed jumpers in the final seconds, and there were four unsuccessful attempts to tip in a miss. Wooden did not call a timeout late in the game, as was his custom in the final two minutes. Curtis, who trash-talked during games, was accused afterwards by Notre Dame's Dwight Clay of taunting.

A week later, the Bruins beat Notre Dame, 94–75, in a rematch at home at Pauley Pavilion. UCLA lost three more times that season. Their bid for an eighth consecutive championship ended after an 80–77 defeat in double-overtime to North Carolina State in the 1974 NCAA tournament semifinals. In his 2016 autobiography, Walton blamed Curtis for both the tournament loss as well as earlier defeats in the season. He criticized Curtis for his overdribbling and trash-talking, and lamented Lee's lack of playing time.

Curtis majored in sociology in college. He later earned an MBA degree at UCLA as well.

== Later years ==
Although Curtis never played in the National Basketball Association (NBA), he was drafted in the seventh round of the 1974 NBA draft by the Buffalo Braves.

He became a mortgage broker with First Interstate Mortgage Company in Pasadena, California. He moved back to Florida in 1984 because his grandmother was ill. He became an international trade representative in Tallahassee with the state Department of Commerce. His job put him into contact with the Central Space Coast Minority Purchasing Council, which assisted minority businesses in working with purchasing agents for government agencies and private industries. After the group merged with a similar Tampa-area group to form the Greater Florida Minority Development Council, Curtis became the council's first full-time executive director.

== Personal ==
Curtis' paternal uncle, Ulysses, also played football at Florida A&M and became one the first blacks to play in the Canadian Football League. Curtis learned to practice Transcendental Meditation during college from Walton, his UCLA teammate. Curtis was also a member of the Fellowship of Christian Athletes.

Curtis died at his home in Port St. Joe, Florida, on August 3, 2021. He was 69.
