= List of Starfinder books =

This is a list of Starfinder books for the Starfinder science fantasy role-playing game.

== First Edition Starfinder ==
=== Rulebooks (1e) ===
Title	Date	Pages	ISBN	Format
First Contact	June 17, 2017 (Free RPG Day)	16	N/A	Hardcover
Core Rulebook	August 17, 2017 (Gen Con)	528	ISBN 978-1-60125-956-1	Hardcover
Alien Archive	October 25, 2017	160	ISBN 978-1-60125-975-2	Hardcover
Pact Worlds	March 28, 2018	216	ISBN 978-1-64078-022-4	Hardcover
Armory	July 27, 2018	160	ISBN 978-1-64078-041-5	Hardcover
Alien Archive 2	October 17, 2018	160	ISBN 978-1-64078-075-0	Hardcover
Alien Archive 3	August 28, 2019	160	ISBN 978-1-64078-149-8	Hardcover
Character Operations Manual	November 13, 2019	160	ISBN 978-1-64078-179-5	Hardcover
Near Space	March 25, 2020	160	ISBN 978-1-64078-212-9	Hardcover
Starship Operations Manual	July 30, 2020	160	ISBN 978-1-64078-249-5	Hardcover
Alien Archive 4	December 9, 2020	160	ISBN 978-1-64078-281-5	Hardcover
Galaxy Exploration Manual	June 2, 2021	160	ISBN 978-1-64078-324-9	Hardcover
Tech Revolution	September 22, 2021	168	ISBN 978-1-64078-352-2	Hardcover
Starfinder Galactic Magic	January 26, 2022	160	ISBN 978-1-64078-379-9	Hardcover
Starfinder Drift Crisis	June 7, 2022	198	ISBN 978-1-64078-419-2	Hardcover
Starfinder Interstellar Species	November 29, 2022	192	ISBN 978-1-64078-473-4	Hardcover
Ports of Call	June 6, 2023	190	ISBN 978-1-64078-514-4	Hardcover
Starfinder Enhanced	October 18, 2023	192	ISBN 978-1-64078-541-0	Hardcover

=== Adventure Paths (1e) ===
Title	Series and Number	Author	Date	Pages	Level	ISBN	Format
Incident at Absalom Station	Dead Suns 1 of 6	Robert G. McCreary	August 17, 2017	64	1	ISBN 978-1-60125-961-5	Softcover
Temple of the Twelve	Dead Suns 2 of 6	John Compton	October 25, 2017	64	3	ISBN 978-1-60125-976-9	Softcover
Splintered Worlds	Dead Suns 3 of 6	Amanda Hamon Kunz	December 2017	64	5	ISBN 978-1-60125-995-0	Softcover
The Ruined Clouds	Dead Suns 4 of 6	Jason Keeley	February 2018	64	7	ISBN 978-1-64078-013-2	Softcover
The Thirteenth Gate	Dead Suns 5 of 6	Stephen Radney-MacFarland	April 15, 2018	64	9	ISBN 978-1-64078-028-6	Softcover
Empire of Bones	Dead Suns 6 of 6	Owen K.C. Stephens	June 29, 2018	64	11	ISBN 978-1-64078-042-2	Softcover
Dead Suns	Dead Suns 1-6 of 6	J. Compton, A. Hamon, T. Hillman, J. Keeley, R. McCreary, S. Radney-MacFarland, O. Stephens	October 26, 2022	304	1-11	ISBN 978-1-64078-459-8	Hardcover
The Reach of Empire	Against the Aeon Throne 1 of 3	Ron Lundeen	August 29, 2018	64	1	ISBN 978-1-64078-061-3	Softcover
Escape from the Prison Moon	Against the Aeon Throne 2 of 3	Eleanor Ferron	September 19, 2018	64	3	ISBN 978-1-64078-067-5	Softcover
The Rune Drive Gambit	Against the Aeon Throne 3 of 3	Larry Wilhelm	October 17, 2018	64	5	ISBN 978-1-64078-076-7	Softcover
The Diaspora Strain	Signal of Screams 1 of 3	Chris S. Sims	November 14, 2018	64	7	ISBN 978-1-64078-095-8	Softcover
The Penumbra Protocol	Signal of Screams 2 of 3	Jenny Jarzabski	December 12, 2018	64	9	ISBN 978-1-64078-097-2	Softcover
Heart of Night	Signal of Screams 3 of 3	Saif Ansari	January 30, 2019	64	11	ISBN 978-1-64078-102-3	Softcover
Fire Starters	Dawn of Flame 1 of 6	James L. Sutter	February 27, 2019	64	1	ISBN 978-1-64078-110-8	Softcover
Soldiers of Brass	Dawn of Flame 2 of 6	Crystal Frasier	March 27, 2019	64	3	ISBN 978-1-64078-117-7	Softcover
Sun Divers	Dawn of Flame 3 of 6	Joe Pasini	April 24, 2019	64	5	ISBN 978-1-64078-125-2	Softcover
The Blind City	Dawn of Flame 4 of 6	Ron Lundeen	May 29, 2019	64	7	ISBN 978-1-64078-130-6	Softcover
Solar Strike	Dawn of Flame 5 of 6	Mark Moreland	June 26, 2019	64	9	ISBN 978-1-64078-139-9	Softcover
Assault on the Crucible	Dawn of Flame 6 of 6	Jason Tondro	July 2019	64	11	ISBN 978-1-64078-145-0	Softcover
Fate of the Fifth	Attack of the Swarm! 1 of 6	Patrick Brennan	August 28, 2019	64	1	ISBN 978-1-64078-151-1	Softcover
The Last Refuge	Attack of the Swarm! 2 of 6	Mara Lynn Butler	September 18, 2019	64	3	ISBN 978-1-64078-156-6	Softcover
Huskworld	Attack of the Swarm! 3 of 6	Lyz Liddell	October 16, 2019	64	5	ISBN 978-1-64078-163-4	Softcover
The Forever Reliquary	Attack of the Swarm! 4 of 6	Kate Baker	November 11, 2019	64	7	ISBN 978-1-64078-180-1	Softcover
Hive of Minds	Attack of the Swarm! 5 of 6	Thurston Hillman	December 11, 2019	64	9	ISBN 978-1-64078-183-2	Softcover
The God-Host Ascends	Attack of the Swarm! 6 of 6	Ron Lundeen	January 29, 2020	64	11	ISBN 978-1-64078-196-2	Softcover
The Chimera Mystery	The Threefold Conspiracy 1 of 6	Jason Keeley	February 26, 2020	64	1	ISBN 978-1-64078-205-1	Softcover
Flight of the Sleepers	The Threefold Conspiracy 2 of 6	Owen K.C. Stephens	March 25, 2020	64	3	ISBN 978-1-64078-213-6	Softcover
Deceivers' Moon	The Threefold Conspiracy 3 of 6	Jason Tondro	April 29, 2020	64	5	ISBN 978-1-64078-222-8	Softcover
The Hollow Cabal	The Threefold Conspiracy 4 of 6	Crystal Frasier	May 27, 2020	64	7	ISBN 978-1-64078-230-3	Softcover
The Cradle Infestation	The Threefold Conspiracy 5 of 6	Vanessa Hoskins	June 24, 2020	64	9	ISBN 978-1-64078-239-6	Softcover
Puppets Without Strings	The Threefold Conspiracy 6 of 6	Landon Winkler	July 30, 2020	64	11	ISBN 978-1-64078-250-1	Softcover
Waking the Worldseed	The Devastation Ark 1 of 3	Jenny Jarzabski	August 26, 2020	64	13	ISBN 978-1-64078-260-0	Softcover
The Starstone Blockade	The Devastation Ark 2 of 3	Eleanor Ferron	September 16, 2020	64	16	ISBN 978-1-64078-265-5	Softcover
Dominion's End	The Devastation Ark 3 of 3	Ron Lundeen	October 14, 2020	64	18	ISBN 978-1-64078-275-4	Softcover
We're No Heroes	Fly Free or Die 1 of 6	BJ Hensley	November 11, 2020	64	1	ISBN 978-1-64078-282-2	Softcover
Merchants of the Void	Fly Free or Die 2 of 6	Leo Glass	December 9, 2020	64	3	ISBN 978-1-64078-291-4	Softcover
Professional Courtesy	Fly Free or Die 3 of 6	Joe Pasini	January 27, 2021	64	5	ISBN 978-1-64078-298-3	Softcover
The White Glove Affair	Fly Free or Die 4 of 6	Kendra Leigh Speedling	February 24, 2021	64	7	ISBN 978-1-64078-304-1	Softcover
Crash and Burn	Fly Free or Die 5 of 6	Christopher Wasko	April 7, 2021	64	9	ISBN 978-1-64078-310-2	Softcover
The Gilded Cage	Fly Free or Die 6 of 6	Jessica Catalan	May 26, 2021	64	11	ISBN 978-1-64078-326-3	Softcover
Planetfall	Horizons of the Vast 1 of 6	Ron Lundeen	July 20, 2021	64	1	ISBN 978-1-64078-336-2	Softcover
Serpents in the Cradle	Horizons of the Vast 2 of 6	Hilary Moon Murphy	November 2, 2021	64	3	ISBN 978-1-64078-353-9	Softcover
Whispers of the Eclipse	Horizons of the Vast 3 of 6	Kate Baker	December 28, 2021	64	5	ISBN 978-1-64078-367-6	Softcover
Icebound	Horizons of the Vast 4 of 6	Jason Tondro	April 12, 2022	64	7	ISBN 978-1-64078-386-7	Softcover
Allies Against the Eye	Horizons of the Vast 5 of 6	Jabari Weathers	April 12, 2022	64	9	ISBN 978-1-64078-395-9	Softcover
The Culling Shadow	Horizons of the Vast 6 of 6	Landon Winkler	June 7, 2022	64	11	ISBN 978-1-64078-409-3	Softcover
The Perfect Storm	Drift Crashers 1 of 3	Jessica Redekop	July 12, 2022	64	1	ISBN 978-1-64078-426-0	Softcover
Nightmare Scenario	Drift Crashers 2 of 3	Jenny Jarzabski	September 13, 2022	64	3	ISBN 978-1-64078-450-5	Softcover
Masters of Time and Space	Drift Crashers 3 of 3	Ron Lundeen	November 1, 2022	64	5	ISBN 978-1-64078-466-6	Softcover
A Light in the Dark	Drift Hackers 1 of 3	Jessica Catalan	December 27, 2022	64	7	ISBN 978-1-64078-485-7	Softcover
Clockwork Demons	Drift Hackers 2 of 3	Quinn Murphy	March 7, 2023	64	9	ISBN 978-1-64078-495-6	Softcover
Into the Dataverse	Drift Hackers 3 of 3	Alexander Augunas	April 26, 2023	64	11	ISBN 978-1-64078-510-6	Softcover
Scoured Stars	Scoured Stars 1 of 1	E. Ferron, V. Hoskins, T. Hillman, J. Jarzabski, M. Kallio, C. Kronewitter, L. Liddell, S. Shahrani, C. Wasko, N. Wasko, and L. Wilhelm	January 31, 2024	256	1	ISBN 978-1-64078-524-3	Hardcover
Mechageddon!	Mechageddon! 1 of 1	Rigby Bendele, Joseph Blomquist, Dennis Muldoon	May 22, 2024	184	3	ISBN 978-1-64078-581-6	Hardcover

=== Standalone Adventures (1e) ===
Title	Author(s)	Date	Pages	Level	ISBN
Skitter Shot	Jason Keeley	June 16, 2018 (Free RPG Day)	16	2	N/A
Skitter Crash	Jason Keeley	June 15, 2019 (Free RPG Day)	16	3	N/A
Skitter Home	Jason Keeley	July 25, 2020 (Free RPG Day)	16	4	N/A
Band on the Run	Luis Loza	May 28, 2021 (PaizoCon)	15	4	N/A
Junker's Delight	Jason Keeley, Misha Bushyager	July 23, 2021	64	1	ISBN 978-1-64078-343-0
The Liberation of Locus-1	Chris Sims	October 13, 2021	64	4	ISBN 978-1-64078-358-4
The Starfinder Four vs. the Hardlight Harlequin	Landon Winkler, Lyz Liddell	October 16, 2021 (Free RPG Day)	16	4	N/A
Redshift Rally	Jessica Catalan	July 27, 2022	64	7	ISBN 978-1-64078-441-3
To Defy the Dragon	Kendra Leigh Speedling	November 16, 2022	64	10	ISBN 978-1-64078-474-1
Drift Crisis Case Files	Dave Nelson, Emily Parks, Andrew White	March 29, 2023	64	3, 7, 10	ISBN 978-1-64078-502-1
Operation Seaside Park	Jenny Jarzabski	July 24, 2023	16	3	N/A

=== Starfinder Society (1e) ===
==== Season 1: Year of Scoured Stars ====
Scenario Number	Arc	Title	Author(s)	Date	Pages	Level
0-01	New Beginnings	Into the Unknown	Ron Lundeen	August 17, 2017	38	1
1-00	New Beginnings, Salvation's End	Claim to Salvation	Larry Wilhelm	August 17, 2017 (Gen Con)	27	4
1-01	New Beginnings	The Commencement	Eleanor Ferron	August 17, 2017	24	1-2
1-02	New Beginnings	Fugitive on the Red Planet	Jim Groves	August 17, 2017	20	1-4
1-03	New Beginnings, Yesteryear	Yesteryear's Truth	Jason Keeley	August 17, 2017	21	1-4
1-04	New Beginnings	Cries From the Drift	Joe Pasini	September 26, 2017	23	1-4
1-05	New Beginnings, Year of Scoured Stars	The First Mandate	Lyz Liddell	October 24, 2017	22	1-4
1-06	New Beginnings	A Night in Nightarch	Mikko Kallio	November 29, 2017	25	3-6
1-07	New Beginnings	The Solar Sortie	Jenny Jarzabski	December 20, 2017	25	1-4
1-08	New Beginnings	Sanctuary of Drowned Delight	Kate Baker	January 30, 2018	23	3-6
1-09	New Beginnings, Salvation's End	Live Exploration Extreme!	John Compton	February 27, 2018	26	1-4
1-10	New Beginnings	The Half-Alive Streets	Mara Lynn Butler	March 28, 2018	23	1-4
1-11	New Beginnings, Year of Scoured Stars	In Pursuit of the Scoured Past	Cole Kronewitter	March 28, 2018	23	3-6
1-12	New Beginnings	Ashes of Discovery	Crystal Malarsky, John Laffan	April 25, 2018	24	1-4
1-13	New Beginnings, Year of Scoured Stars	On the Trail of History	Christopher Wasko	April 25, 2018	23	3-6
1-14	New Beginnings	Star Sugar Heartlove!!!	Eleanor Ferron	May 30, 2018	24	3-6
1-15	New Beginnings	Save the Renkrodas	Vanessa Hoskins	May 30, 2018	23	3-6
1-16	New Beginnings	Dreaming of the Future	Natalie Kertzner, Nate Wright, Sasha Lindley Hall, Tineke Bolleman	June 27, 2018	30	1-4
1-17	New Beginnings, Year of Scoured Stars	Reclaiming the Time-Lost Tear	Larry Wilhelm	June 27, 2018	21	5-8
1-18	New Beginnings	The Blackmoon Survey	Jesse Benner	July 2018	21	1-4
1-19	New Beginnings	To Conquer the Dragon	Matt Duval	July 2018	23	5-8
1-99	New Beginnings, Year of Scoured Stars, Scoured Stars Invasion	The Scoured Stars Invasion	Mikko Kallio	August 2, 2018 (Gen Con); July 3, 2019 (public)	72	1-8
1-20	New Beginnings, Salvation's End	Duskmire Accord 9	Brian Duckwitz	August 2018	26	1-4
1-21	The Jinsul Threat, Yesteryear	Yesteryear's Sorrow	Jason Keeley	August 2018	22	3-6
1-22	The Jinsul Threat	The Protectorate Petition	Mike Kimmel	September 26, 2018	24	1-4
1-23	The Jinsul Threat, Scoured Stars Invasion	Return to Sender	Natalie Kertzner	September 26, 2018	20	5-8
1-24	The Jinsul Threat	Siege of Enlightenment	Tineke Bolleman	October 31, 2018	27	1-4
1-25	The Jinsul Threat	The Beacon Code Dilemma	Adrian Ng	October 31, 2018	28	3-6
1-26	The Jinsul Threat, Scoured Stars Invasion	Truth of the Seeker	Shahreena Shahrani	November 28, 2018	25	3-6
1-27	The Jinsul Threat	King Xeros of Star Azlant	Christopher Wasko	November 28, 2018	24	5-8
1-28	The Jinsul Threat	It Rests Beneath	Jason Tondro	December 19, 2018	23	1-4
1-29	The Jinsul Threat, Year of Scoured Stars, Scoured Stars Invasion	Honorbound Emissaries	Jenny Jarzabski	December 19, 2018	23	7-10
1-30	The Jinsul Threat	Survivor's Salvation	Kiel Howell	January 30, 2019	23	1-4
1-31	The Jinsul Threat, Year of Scoured Stars, Scoured Stars Invasion	Treading History's Folly	Vanessa Hoskins	January 30, 2019	22	3-6
1-32	The Jinsul Threat	Acts of Association	Scott Young	February 27, 2019	37	1-4
1-33	The Jinsul Threat	Data Breach	Jim Groves	February 27, 2019	22	3-6
1-34	The Jinsul Threat, Year of Scoured Stars, Scoured Stars Invasion	Heart of the Foe	Nicholas Wasko	March 27, 2019	22	3-6
1-35	The Jinsul Threat, Rasheen	Rasheen's Riches	Mara Lynn Butler	March 27, 2019	24	5-8
1-36	The Jinsul Threat	Enter the Ashen Asteroid	Larry Wilhelm	April 24, 2019	26	1-4
1-37	The Jinsul Threat	Siege of Civility	Kalervo Oikarinen	April 24, 2019	20	5-8
1-38	The Jinsul Threat, Scoured Stars Invasion	The Many Minds of Historia	Lyz Liddell	May 29, 2019	22	5-8
1-39	The Jinsul Threat, Year of Scoured Stars, Scoured Stars Invasion	The Herald's War	Mikko Kallio	May 29, 2019	23	7-10
1-98	The Jinsul Threat	Into the Perplexity: The First Trial	Thurston Hillman	November 24, 2020	[data missing]	3-6
2-00	The Jinsul Threat, Year of Scoured Stars, Scoured Stars Invasion	Fate of the Scoured God	Christopher Wasko	June 2019 (Origins Game Fair); June 30, 2020 (public)	92	1-10

==== Season 2: Year of a Thousand Bites ====
Scenario Number	Arc	Title	Author(s)	Date	Pages	Level
2-01	-	Pact World Warriors	Jenny Jarzabski	June 26, 2019	29	1-4
2-02	-	Waking the Past	Tom Philips	June 26, 2019	25	3-6
2-03	-	The Withering World	Arc Riley, Jennifer Povey, Jessica Catalan, Rigby Bendele, Shahreena Shahrani	August 1, 2019	31	1-4
2-04	Salvation's End	Future's Fall	Matt Duval	August 1, 2019	28	7-10
2-05	-	Meeting of Queens	Kiel Howell	August 18, 2019	23	1-4
2-06	The Stumbling Society	Sangoro's Lament	Mike Kimmel	August 28, 2019	25	5-8
2-07	-	Four for the First	Thurston Hillman	September 25, 2019	27	1-4
2-08	The Stumbling Society	Sangoro's Gifts	Kendra Leigh Speedling	September 25, 2019	23	5-8
2-09	-	Bluerise Breakout	Jason Tondro	October 30, 2019	23	1-4
2-10	-	Corporate Interests	Diego Valdez, Emily Parks, Joseph Blomquist, Sam Phelan	October 30, 2019	32	3-6
2-11	-	Descent into Verdant Shadow	Larry Wilhelm	November 27, 2019	27	3-6
2-12	-	Colossus Heist	Amanda Hamon	November 27, 2019	27	7-10
2-13	-	Storm of the End Times	Nicholas Wasko	December 18, 2019	26	1-4
2-14	-	Data Purge	Cole Kronewitter	December 18, 2019	25	9-12
2-15	-	The Infernal Gallery	Jessica Catalan	January 29, 2020	26	1-4
2-16	-	A Scoured Home	Christopher Wasko	January 29, 2020	24	5-8
2-17	-	Cost of Living	Andrew Mullen, Jenny Jarzabski	February 26, 2020	20	3-6
2-18	-	Forbidden Tides	Kate Baker	February 26, 2020	25	7-10
2-19	-	Truth Keepers	John Curtin, Natalie Kertzner	March 25, 2020	29	3-6
2-20	-	Shades of Spite	Vanessa Hoskins	March 25, 2020	23	7-10
2-21	-	Illegal Shipment	Joseph Blomquist	April 29, 2020	26	1-4
2-22	Rasheen	Rasheen's Reception	Mara Lynn Butler	April 29, 2020	22	5-8
2-23	-	The Edge of Cadascon	Emily Parks	May 28, 2020	22	3-6
2-24	-	Cornered Rat	Mikko Kallio	May 28, 2020	27	9-12
3-00	-	The Last Bite	Jenny Jarzabski	July 2020 (Gen Con); TBA (public)	[data missing]	1-8

==== Season 3: Year of Exploration's Edge ====
Scenario Number	Arc	Title	Author	Date	Pages	Level
3-01	-	Crash Down	Jason Tondro	June 24, 2020	33	1-4
3-02	-	The Subterranean Safari	Jessica Catalan	June 24, 2020	37	3-6
3-03	Frozen Ambitions	The Shimmerstone Gateway	Samantha Phelan	July 30, 2020	25	1-4
3-04	The Vast Experiment	Falling into Deliverance	John Compton	July 30, 2020	31	1-4
3-05	-	The Hivemarket Heist	Jim Groves	August 26, 2020	29	1-4
3-06	Salvation's End	Rise of the Vault Lord	Matt Duval	August 26, 2020	36	7-10
3-07	-	Strike at Zone 78	Rigby Bendele	September 30, 2020	28	3-6
3-08	Fleeting Truth	The Darkside Depository	Kendra Leigh Speedling	September 30, 2020	24	9-12
3-09	Frozen Ambitions	Freeing the Herd	Diego Valdez	October 28, 2020	27	1-4
3-10	-	Live Adventure Extreme!	Scott D. Young	October 28, 2020	49	5-8
3-11	Combatant's Concerto	Into the Veskarium	Abbey Schnell, Alison Cybe, Ivis K. Flanagan, Jan Martin	November 18, 2020	33	3-6
3-12	The Vast Experiment	The Vast Experiment: First Flight	Kyle Elzy	November 18, 2020	33	5-8
3-13	-	Silence at Outpost 634	Emily Parks	December 30, 2020	27	1-4
3-14	Fleeting Truth	Hollow Lies	Jessica Catalan	December 30, 2020	31	9-12
3-15	Frozen Ambitions	The Preluria Connection	Tineke Bolleman	January 27, 2021	31	1-4
3-16	The Vast Experiment	Fast Choices	Mike Kimmel	January 27, 2021	[data missing]	5-8
3-17	Salvation's End	Clone Batch Catastrophe	Christopher Wasko	February 24, 2021	30	1-4
3-18	-	Secrets in Stillness	Joseph Blomquist	February 24, 2021	31	3-6
3-19	-	Rat's Repentance	Dave Nelson, Drew Taylor, Lau Bannenberg, Shay Snow	March 31, 2021	35	1-4
3-20	Fleeting Truth	Everchanging Revelation	Cole Kronewitter	March 31, 2021	33	11-14
3-21	Frozen Ambitions	Renewal's Blight	Isis Wozniakowska	April 28, 2021	31	3-6
3-22	The Vast Experiment, Data Scourge	Dancing at the Edge	Mikko Kallio	April 28, 2021	31	7-10
3-99	-	Perils of the Past	Kendra Leigh Speedling	August 31, 2022	TBA	1-8

==== Season 4: Year of the Data Scourge ====
Scenario Number	Arc	Title	Author(s)	Date	Pages	Level
4-01	Data Scourge	Intro: Year of the Data Scourge	Jenny Jarzabski	May 28, 2021	30	1-4
4-02	-	Settling Accounts	Alison Cybe	June 30, 2021	31	1-4
4-03	Data Scourge	Battle for the Beacon	Abbey Schnell	June 30, 2021	31	5-8
4-04	Data Scourge	Mission Not Found	Rigby Bendele	July 28, 2021	[data missing]	3-6
4-05	-	A Waltz Through Myriad Worlds	Alexi Greer, Fabby Garza, Katrina Hennessy, Quinn Murphy	July 28, 2021	[data missing]	1-4
4-06	Combatant's Concerto	Prelude to Revolution	Shay Snow	August 25, 2021	[data missing]	3-6
4-07	Data Scourge	A Haven for Scourged Machines	Nicholas Wasko	August 25, 2021	[data missing]	7-10
4-08	-	Precious Cargo	Diego Valdez	October 2, 2021	[data missing]	1-4
4-09	-	Through Sea and Storm	Jessica Catalan	October 27, 2021	[data missing]	7-10
4-10	Data Scourge	The Way In	Dennis Muldoon	October 27, 2021	[data missing]	5-8
4-11	Data Scourge	A World's Ambition	Matt Duval	November 17, 2021	[data missing]	7-10
4-12	-	A Festive Operation	Ivis K. Flanagan	December 15, 2021	[data missing]	3-6
4-13	Data Scourge	Hard Reset	Joseph Blomquist	January 26, 2022	[data missing]	1-4
4-14	Rasheen	Rasheen's Remembrance	Mara Lynn Butler	February 23, 2022	[data missing]	7-10
4-15	Data Scourge	Feuding Faiths	Scott D. Young	March 30, 2022	[data missing]	5-8
4-16	Data Scourge	Hope for the Future	Jenny Jarzabski	April 27, 2022	[data missing]	5-8
4-99	-	A Time of Crisis	Dennis Muldoon	May 31, 2022	[data missing]	1-6

==== Season 5: Year of Redemption's Rise ====
Scenario Number	Arc	Title	Author(s)	Date	Pages	Level
5-01	Redemption's Rise	Intro: Year of Redemption's Rise	Alex Speidel	June 1, 2022	[data missing]	1-4
5-02	Redemption's Rise	Road to Reconciliation	Shay Snow	June 1, 2022	[data missing]	3-6
5-03	Combatant's Concerto	Fugue of the Traitor	Alison Cybe	June 1, 2022	[data missing]	7-10
5-04	Redemption's Rise	Fragment of the 4th	Isis Wozniakowska	June 29, 2022	[data missing]	9-12
5-05	Redemption's Rise	Boom-block Gambit	Lysle Kapp	July 27, 2022	[data missing]	5-8
5-06	Tarnished Legacy	Historia Holdout	Hilary Moon Murphy	August 31, 2022	[data missing]	1-4
5-07	Redemption's Rise	Planar Bloom	Joan Hong	August 31, 2022	[data missing]	5-8
5-08	Tarnished Legacy	Star Sugar Superstar!!!	Emily Parks	September 28, 2022	[data missing]	1-4
5-09	Redemption's Rise	Counterfeit History	Letterio Mammoliti	October 26, 2022	[data missing]	3-6
5-10	Salvation's End	Shadow of the Vault Lord	Matt Duval	October 26, 2022	[data missing]	9-12
5-11	Redemption's Rise	Archivist's Inquiry	Katrina Hennessy	November 30, 2022	[data missing]	1-4
5-12	Redemption's Rise	Envar's Expeditions	Kendra Leigh Speedling	December 14, 2022	[data missing]	3-6
5-13	Redemption's Rise	Finding the Forgotten	Kate Baker and Dennis Muldoon	January 25, 2023	[data missing]	7-10
5-14	Redemption's Rise	Ghost Level Delve	Michael Bramnik	February 22, 2023		1-4
5-15	Redemption's Rise	Beta Test	Rigby Bendele	March 29, 2023		11-14
5-16	Redemption's Rise	To Catch A King	Christopher Wasko	April 26, 2023		5-8
5-99	Redemption's Rise	Battle for the Bulwark	Lysle Kapp, Cole Kronewitter	August 2, 2023		1-8

==== Season 6: Year of Fortune's Fall ====
Scenario Number	Arc	Title	Author(s)	Date	Pages	Level
6-01	Fortune's Fall	Intro: Year of Fortune's Fall	Skyler-James "Mahpiya" Wall	May 31, 2023	[data missing]	1-4
6-02	Fortune's Fall	Drift Scars	Erin Roberts	May 31, 2023	[data missing]	3-6
6-03	Fortune's Fall	Project Dawn	Joseph Blomquist	June 28, 2023	[data missing]	3-6
6-04	Fortune's Fall	Secrets Long Submerged	John Godek III	June 28, 2023	[data missing]	9-12
6-05	Fortune's Fall	Unearthing Ulumbia	Lau Bannenberg	August 2, 2023	[data missing]	5-8
6-06	Fortune's Fall	Tomorrow's Seekers	Alex Speidel	August 30, 2023	[data missing]	1-4
6-07	Fortune's Fall	Race for the Dustwarren Cup	Solomon St. John	September 27, 2023	[data missing]	1-4
6-08	Fortune's Fall	Lost Revelry	Mikko Kallio	October 25, 2023	[data missing]	5-8
6-09	Fortune's Fall	Ridgerock Rescue	Charlie Brooks	October 25, 2023	[data missing]	1-4
6-10	Fortune's Fall	The Death of Kortus IV	Alison Cybe	November 29, 2023		9-12
6-11	Fortune's Fall	Gifts Ungiven	Jeremy Corff	December 20, 2023		1-4
6-12	Fortune's Fall	Yesteryear's Hope	Hilary Moon Murphy	January 31, 2024		3-6
6-13	Fortune's Fall	The Beginning of the End	Isis Wozniakowska	February 28, 2024		5-8
6-14	Fortune's Fall	The Missing	Kim Frandsen	February 28, 2024		1-4
6-15	Fortune's Fall	Extraction from Azlanti Space	Quinn Murphy	March 27, 2024		11-14
6-16	Fortune's Fall	Dawning Fate	Linda Zayas-Palmer	April 24, 2024		7-10
6-99	Fortune's Fall	The End Awakens	Joseph Blomquist, Mike Kimmel	August 1, 2024		1-4

==== Season 7: Year of Era's End ====
Scenario Number	Arc	Title	Author(s)	Date	Pages	Level
7-01	Year of Era's End	Intro: Year of Era's End	Letterio Mammoliti	May 29, 2024	30	1-4
7-02	Year of Era's End	Zo! vs. Zo	Jenny Jarzabski	May 29, 2024	26	3-6
7-03	Year of Era's End	Aucturn Asunder	Christopher Wasko	June 26, 2024	28	7-10
7-04	Year of Era's End	Inheritors of Gadrathar	Michael Bramnik	July 31, 2024		5-8
7-05	Year of Era's End	The Day the River Died	Joan Hong	August 28, 2024	30	3-6
7-06	Year of Era's End	Archives of Eternity	Katrina Hennessy	September 25, 2024	29	1-4
7-07	Year of Era's End	Submerged Stars	Rigby Bendele	October 30, 2024	35	5-8
7-08	Year of Era's End	Envar's Awesome Rescue	Kendra Leigh Speedling	November 27, 2024	32	3-6
7-09	Year of Era's End	Clutches of the Vault Lord	Matt Duval	December 18, 2024	37	9–12
7-10	Year of Era's End	Rasheen's Requiem	Solomon St. John	January 29, 2025	28	7–10
7-11	Year of Era's End	Breaking the Crucible	Ivis K. Flanagan, Kendra Leigh Speedling	February 26, 2025	32	5–8
7-12	Year of Era's End	Those Who Call	Brent Bowser	March 26, 2025		3–6
7-13	Year of Era's End	Ratrod's Revenge	Dennis Muldoon	April 30, 2025		5–8
7-14	Year of Era's End	Final Assessment	Thurston Hillman	May 28, 2025		11–14

==== Miscellaneous ====
Scenario Number	Arc	Title	Author(s)	Date	Pages	Level
99-01	-	Intro: The First Test	Jason Keeley	May 28, 2021	24	1-2
99-02	-	Intro: For the Factions	Kate Baker	May 28, 2021	31	1-2

== Second Edition Starfinder ==
=== Rulebooks (2e) ===
Title	Date	Pages	ISBN	Format
Second Edition Playtest Rulebook	August 1, 2024	264	ISBN 978-1-64078-594-6	Hardcover
Galaxy Guide	May 7, 2025	176	ISBN 978-1-64078-663-9	Hardcover
Player Core	July 31, 2025	464	ISBN 978-1-64078-686-8	Hardcover
GM Core	September 3, 2025	264	ISBN 978-1-64078-699-8	Hardcover
Alien Core	November 5, 2025	224	ISBN 978-1-64078-748-3	Hardcover
Galactic Ancestries	April 1, 2026	224	ISBN 978-1-64078-781-0	Hardcover

=== Adventure Paths (2e) ===
Title	Series and Number	Author	Date	Pages	Level	ISBN	Format
Guilt of the Grave World	N/A	Michael Bramnik	Expected October 8, 2025	128	1-5	ISBN 978-1-64078-711-7	Hardcover

=== Standalone Adventures (2e) ===
Title	Author(s)	Date	Pages	Level	ISBN
Playtest Adventure: A Cosmic Birthday	Jenny Jarzabski	August 1, 2024	64	1	ISBN 978-1-64078-595-3
Playtest Adventure: Empires Devoured	Thurston Hillman	October 30, 2024	64	10	ISBN 978-1-64078-617-2
Murder in Metal City	Jenny Jarzabski	July 28, 2025	64	1	ISBN 978-1-64078-690-5

=== Playtest scenarios ===
Title	Author(s)	Date	Pages	Level
Shards of the Glass Planet	Mike Kimmel	August 1, 2024	13	1
It Came from the Vast!	Jessica Catalan	August 1, 2024	11	5
Wheel of Monsters	Dustin Knight	September 25, 2024	28	10
Rescue at Shimmerstone Mine	Jenny Jarzabski	October 30, 2024	15	15

=== Starfinder Society (2e) ===
==== Season 1: Invasion's Edge ====
Scenario Number	Arc	Title	Author(s)	Date	Level
1-00	Invasion's Edge	Collision's Wake	John Godek	July 30, 2025	3
1-01	Invasion's Edge	Invasion's Edge	Michael Bramnik	July 30, 2025	1-2
1-02	Invasion's Edge	Mystery of the Frozen Moon	Solomon St. John	July 30, 2025	1-2
1-03	Invasion's Edge	Disaster at Dreamlink Labs	Caryn DiMarco	August 27, 2025	1-2
1-04	Invasion's Edge	The Great Absalom Relay	Alex Speidel	August 27, 2025	1-2
1-05	Invasion's Edge	Sloughscar Summit	Lysle Kapp	September 24, 2025	1-2
1-06	Invasion's Edge	Magic in the Mist	Scott D. Young	September 24, 2025	1-2
1-07	Invasion's Edge	Seize and Destroy	Shan Wolf	October 29, 2025	1-2
1-08	Invasion's Edge	Compliance Protocol	Elizabeth V. Nold	October 29, 2025	1-2
1-09	Invasion's Edge	Abduction	Brent Bowser	November 19, 2025	1-2
1-10	Invasion's Edge	Rites of Rekidling	Hilary Moon Murphy	November 19, 2025	1-2
1-11	Invasion's Edge	Friends of the Forest	Sara Jeffers	December 17, 2025	1-2
1-12	Invasion's Edge	Take the Bait	Jeremy Corff	December 17, 2025	3-4
1-13	Invasion's Edge	Foul Humors	Rue Dickey	January 7, 2026	1-2
1-14	Invasion's Edge	The Beasts of Bo: Part One	Joseph Blomquist	January 7, 2026	3-4
1-15	Invasion's Edge	Ruins of the World Soul	David N. Ross	February 4, 2026	3-4
1-16	Invasion's Edge	The Beasts of Bo: Part Two	Victoria Sullivan	February 4, 2026	3-4
1-17	Invasion's Edge	Corpse Fleet Conflict	Letterio Mammoliti	March 4, 2026	3-4
1-18	Invasion's Edge	Midnights in Maro	Rigby Bendele	March 4, 2026	3-4

== See also ==
- List of Pathfinder books
