= DragonMech =

Tabletop role-playing game campaign setting

Dragonmech
- Cover
- Designers: Joseph Goodman
- Publishers: Goodman Games, Sword & Sorcery Studios
- Publication: 2004
- Genres: Steampunk,fantasy
- Systems: d20 system

Dragonmech is a steampunk/fantasy campaign setting for d20 fantasy developed by Goodman Games and Sword & Sorcery Studios. It centers on giant mechs, powerful war machines powered by steam, clockwork, magic, or slave labor. Characters in this setting are engaged in epic conflicts in a world of ancient ruins, mighty mechdoms and towering city-mechs.

== Setting ==
Dragonmech is set in a world where the moon is quite literally falling apart, resulting in regular meteor showers across the planet's surface. Lunar magic has started finding its way onto the planet below, along with lunar creatures including lunar dragons, which only vaguely resemble their terrestrial counterparts. Built to combat these new threats are the DragonMechs, specially designed for combat with large creatures. Also created were the city-mechs, huge mobile cities that can support not only a large population, but its own ecology.

The main continent in the setting is Highpoint, an unusually altitudinous continent broken into several levels of elevation, with the lowest area of it being a desert that is knee-deep in seawater for half of Highpoint's 250-odd day calendar. A major feature is the "Endless" River, which runs through a large section of the continent and, in fact, runs for about half its length through the Underdark, and serves as the most important trade route on the continent. The Endless river exits the underground as a large waterfall from the side of a cliff. Highpoint's largest city, Edge, is actually built on this cliff and around this waterfall, and a thriving local economy is in large part based on the transport of people and goods up and down the cliff. Trade in Edge is so lucrative that even the drow have a trading enclave there, and all its members are under strict orders to be civil and polite to everyone who comes to do business.

=== Factions ===
While in many d20 campaigns, there are inevitable tensions between the races, in DragonMech these tensions are magnified to levels of almost xenophobia. One of the defining characteristics of this setting is then it is NOT humanocentric; the single most successful and powerful core race of the planet is in fact the Dwarves.

Dwarves: Many other campaigns characterize the dwarves as a dying breed, a race for whom many of their ancient and legendary strongholds have been overrun, with little hope of recovery. But in this campaign, while they have suffered disastrously from refugee invasions, their innovation has in fact made them able to rebound dramatically, catapulting them into a level of political and social power rarely seen. As the creators of a technology that is capable of reversing the fortunes of those living in this world, they control the largest and arguably the safest sections of open land in the world of Highpoint. They also control the most city mechs; the five city mechs of Nedderpik, Durgen-lok, Lokag, Thuron, and Goria form the core of their military might, as well as the centers of their political power. Together with Duerok, arguably the core of Dwarven civilization that remains underground, these five city mechs form the Stenian Confederacy.

Elves: The Elves have their part in this world as well, but their role is in fact emotionally similar to that of the Elves in The Lord of the Rings – that their time is passing and their way of life all but gone. This theme is more nihilistically represented in DragonMech for, unlike in Tolkien's work, these Elves have nowhere to go. Rather than their powers fading from them, instead their homelands have been shattered and ruined by the Lunar Rain, their ancestral homelands and forests all but eradicated. All that remains are a few animated mechs serving as repositories for hastily salvaged elven libraries, and the sole Elven City Mech (not to mention the single most powerful construction in Highpoint) known as Tannanliel.

Tannanliel cannot be adequately explained without first describing Tannan himself, for it was formed by a pact between the archmage Tannan and the overwhelmed native deities. As a result, its awesome might is being powered by a constant drain on Tannan's life force, costing him roughly a year of his life for each week he operates it. Although he is an elf, with an elf's life span, he still remains mortal, and his time is rapidly running out. The L'arile Nation, last hope of the elves, rests on Tannanliel, which itself is dependent on Tannan himself. Tannan has kept the knowledge of the city mech's price to himself, a fact that is costing him dearly on a personal level.

The tragic error of Tannanliel is that all of the remaining real power of the Elves resides in its single form; and that single form can only be one place at a time. While it remains a mighty protector it is incapable of prosecuting the total war needed to drive back and destroy the lunar invaders, and though none are aware of it, all the lunar invaders need do to eliminate it is to wait for Tannan to die.

Humans: The rising power of Highpoint, the Legion is headed by a single, massively charismatic figure by the name of Shar Thizdic. Through his personal magnetism and shrewd political maneuverings he united the scattered nomadic humans of the plains to form a powerful nation that is solely for humans. Through the forced labor of enslaved dwarven coglayers, he created the first of two citymechs currently operative, known as Rebirth.

Whether the result of shoddy construction, or deliberate sabotage (referred to by its believers as the One Flaw), Rebirth was something of a disaster. Plagued with failures and poor efficiency on a daily basis, Rebirth remains a citymech, and is still a powerful force in its own right. As the first human Citymech, Shar Thizdic seats himself as ruler here, a symbolic gesture of leadership. Because of its problems, Rebirth is generally acknowledged to be the weakest of all existing citymechs, and was originally discounted by dwarves and elves alike. But human engineers, learning from their work assisting the captured dwarves, and from their own works afterward, have caused an uproar amongst the other nations, with their subsequent construction of the second human citymech, Haven.

Haven is a significant improvement over Rebirth, and a massive undertaking whose scale is greater than all other citymechs save Tannanliel itself. Already it has proven its power in battles against lunar monstrosities including the terrifyingly powerful lunar dragons, and some doubt has been assayed over the outcome of any battles between it and one of the dwarven citymechs. But the real panic being levelled against the human nation is that Shar Thizdic has plans for five more citymechs. Many in Highpoint are wondering what power the human nations will wield by the time the final citymech has been built, and support is growing amongst both elves and dwarves to deal with the Legion in general, and Shar Thizdic in specific, on a permanent basis.

Their mistrust and paranoia are in fact founded on good reason. Shar Thizdic is very much prohuman, a stance caused by the fend-for-yourself mentality that gripped the races during the early parts of the lunar rain. He holds no actual malicious intent against elves, gnomes, and dwarves, but because they did not compassionately aid humans during the early, and most intense, part of the crisis when the plains-nomads humans had no shelter at all, he does not aid them, and if he builds his five more city mechs like he plans to, they each will need a substantial territory to roam—territory which is held by the elves and the dwarves. Non humans are third class citizens in Legion territory, and are never permitted aboard Legion citymechs. His habit of casual betrayal, enslavement, and murder- however well he has managed to hide most of the proof- may well be the downfall of the only hope that humans in highpoint truly have, should the other races of Highpoint decide to finally take action and eliminate him as a threat for once and all.

=== Deities ===
Dragonmech deities are similar to those in other campaign settings, with only a few significant differences. First, the deities are slowly losing a war with the Lunar gods. Unaccustomed to working together, they are losing ground badly to the unified front presented by the gods of the lunar monsters. But there is one factor of hope- an emergent deity who is rapidly gaining power and consciousness known as Dotrak. Gaining in power from the rapidly blooming faith in machines, Dotrak is making his powers known by the random animation of free roaming gear piles, the spontaneous transformation of persons into mechanical prophets, and even the conversion of druids into caretakers of machine forests. Should Dotrak emerge as a fully empowered deity and join the fight against the lunar gods, the tide of battle will shift drastically. However, Dotrak is a mostly unformed power, with no personality, agenda, or real intelligence—yet. Not all people who reject the old gods worship Dotrak. Many coglayers and steamborgs view him as the designer and builder of the Great Engine of the universe, a power who does not require that mortals think of him, only that they think.

== New Races ==
With the changes in the world, new races are coming into being to fill new ecological niches as they occur.

=== Coglings ===
Feral halflings who have adapted to the new world, Coglings make their homes by living as unobtrusively as possible in the gear forests of the largest mechs. Although from halfling stock, they are rapidly evolving to be their own distinct race.

Coglings make a whole society based on "Don't get caught." Coglings live in constant fear of discovery, which makes them hone their stealth and hiding skills to perfection. They have also taken up preventative maintenance on the gear forests in which they live, correctly reasoning that no one comes into the dangerous innards of the biggest engines in the world unless they absolutely must enter to locate and fix a problem. Therefore, the Coglings have taken up mechanical aptitude to keep the gear forests in perfect shape—and many are the coglayers of a citymech who brag about how little trouble their section of the engines have given, unaware the smooth operation is due to a tribe of coglings smoothing out small problems before they escalate.

=== Tik'Toks ===
Entirely mechanical life, Tik'toks are reminiscent of the Warforged of the Eberron setting, but made entirely from technology rather than magic. Their imperfect forms of gears and parts make them seem more human than warforged with their carefully sculpted forms. Tik'toks have emotions and build their own children, but the process is difficult and prone to failure, a consequence that can scar them for many years. They tend towards the reverence or at least acknowledgement of Dotrak, an emergent Deity whose demesne is Machines.

=== Tortogs ===
Reptilian, tortoise-like humanoids whose heavy shells and armored hide protect them from all but the worst of the lunar rain. They have turned this protection into a racial profession of trading. Their society is strange, but it has been shown to place importance on dreams and visions, a peculiarity given they are otherwise fairly sophisticated.

=== Slathem ===
The slathem are fish-like humanoids who exist equally well both in and out of the water. The slathem have not been too terribly affected by the lunar rain. Certain of their towns and cities are underwater for part of the year, because of the immense seasonal tides characteristic of Highpoint. The winter/summer seasons result in more polar ice cap melting/freezing than on earth, so the Highpoint seasons are labeled Highwater and Lowwater. Increased tidal effects due to the moon only amplify this problem.

=== Zuleps ===
Warriorlike humanoid leptoceratopses. They philosophy is that strength is, when you can get what your want without any compromise, and therefore they see trading as a sign of weakness. However, they cannot get everything with raiding, so they are forced to trade with other races, but because of their perceived pride, they take part in a ritual fight with their merchant partners. This ritual fight is indeed very serious: it ends only, if somebody lost his life in the battle.

== Mechs ==
Most mechs in Dragonmech are powered by steam. They are the widely accepted standards, and the second-cheapest kind of mech around. The different kinds of mech are as follows:

Man-powered Mechs - These are powered by slaves turning cranks and pedalling belts to keep the mech going. Favored among orcs, who use this as their primary mechs. Cheapest by far.

Steam Mechs - Using steam engines, these mechs require great amounts of fuel to keep running. They are, price and effectiveness considered, the mechs best suited for armies. The first kind of mechs constructed in recent times.

Clockwork Mechs - Operating on fine mechanics, this mech can support itself with power, only needing a recharge about once a week. It is one of the most effective mech designs around.

Undead Mechs - These rare mechs are constructed from dead bodies and animated by great necromancers.

Animated Mechs - A special kind of golem used similar to mechs. Favored among elves. They are extremely effective, but also enormously expensive.

== Classes ==
In addition to the standard Dungeons & Dragons character classes, Dragonmech introduces new base classes:

=== Coglayer ===
The coglayer is a mech and steam mechanic. They use steam powers to create technological weapons, devices, and to augment mechs.

==== Steam Powers ====
Steam Powers give the Coglayer abilities beyond Mech construction. These modular powers can be combined in order to create complex effects. Steam Powers can be combined with existing weapons such as crossbows, swords, or steamguns to create automated weapons, or stand-alone effects such as interrogation devices or steam powered undead, such as meat racks and smoking dead.

=== Mech Jockey ===
The Mech Jockey is the ultimate mech pilot. Spending all their time training with mechs, they have incredible piloting skill and can skillfully gauge the limits of a mech so they know exactly how far they can push it.

=== Steamborg ===
The steamborg is a hybrid of man and technology. With a steam engine surgically implanted into his body, the steamborg uses steam powers and artificial limbs to augment himself. Also, the Mark 2 Steamborg, the second generation, trades the vast number of features of the fixed Steamborg slightly for a far greater degree of versatility. Considered to be even more alarming than regular steamborgs, seemingly heralds the constant evolution of the Steamborg until flesh and blood become obsolete.

=== Clockwork Ranger ===
Based on the ranger, the Clockwork Rangers live in the bowels of the city-mechs themselves. These regions are called Gear Forests, vast engine-rooms that have developed their own unique ecology.

=== Prestige Classes ===
There are many prestige classes that represent further specialization into the setting of Dragonmech, many of them presented in Steam Warriors.

As can be expected, many of the prestige classes involve mechs and these focus around either piloting a mech (such as the feared Mech Devils), fighting a mech (such as the Anklebiter), and two classes (Assimilated and Mech Symbiote) revolve around becoming a part of a mech.

Some other classes involve special focus on or uses of technology, which can include combining it with magic.

Finally, there are many classes based around the Steamborg concept. These are as varied as the Necroborg (undead and powered by a steam engine), the Lunarborg (whose physiology is being altered by burning a substance in their engine), the Chainmuscle (who gains great physical toughness, improvements to their combat ability, and improved attributes as they replace more of their body), and the Ghostgear (who combines the steamborg with lethal stealth). There is even the Unborg, who, after going so far down the path of steamborg, voluntarily rejects the transformation and begins to regain their humanity.

== Reviews ==
- Backstab #49
- Dragon Slayer
- Pyramid
- Realms of Fantasy

== See also ==
- Ancient Steel Role Playing Game by Roger Huntman
