= Free RPG Day =

Annual event

Free RPG Day is an annual promotional event by the tabletop role-playing game industry. The event rules are fairly simple: participating publishers provide special free copies of games to participating game stores; the game store agrees to provide one free game to any person who requests a free game on Free RPG Day.

== History ==
Shannon Appelcline discussed the comic book Crisis in Raimiton (2004), which was "an 'Adventure Guide to D&D' that Wizards gave away on Free Comic Book Day '04. It told the story of gamers playing D&D, and then the story of the characters they created. Wizards' interest in the free giveaway foreshadowed the industry's interest in a free giveaway day of their own: Free RPG Day." Appelcline noted that for the game distributor Impressions Advertising & Marketing, their "most successful advertising program is one that continues today: Free RPG Day. Beginning in 2007, Impressions has every year coordinated the give-away of original RPG products in game stores across the country, resulting in considerable buzz and interest in those products — which is exactly what Impressions, an advertising and marketing company, was looking for."

Inspired by Free Comic Book Day, Free RPG Day was started in 2007. The event was coordinated worldwide by Impressions from 2007 until 2019 when Free RPG Day was acquired by the gaming retailer organization Gaming Days, which has coordinated the event since.

Appelcline noted that "Goodman Games' last stand against the dying d20 market was Free RPG Day 2007. Where most companies were offering up a single product of variable quality, Goodman contributed three different books to Free RPG Day, each one of them a top-quality production." Paizo Publishing previewed the new GameMastery Modules series with D0: Hollow's Last Hope (2007), which first appeared on June 23, 2007, as part of the initial Free RPG Day. Flying Buffalo assembled quick-start editions for Tunnels & Trolls for the 2007, 2008, and 2011 Free RPG Days. Margaret Weis Productions released the Castlemourn Cortex System Quickstart for the 2008 Free RPG Day but then shut down the game line. Green Ronin previewed their first new role-playing game, A Song of Ice and Fire Roleplaying (2009), at Free RPG Day 2008. Troll Lord Games presented a "quick start" version of Castles & Crusades at each Free RPG Day from 2007–2011 to draw in new players, and Troll Lord also previewed their science fiction role-playing game StarSIEGE: Event Horizon at Free RPG Day 2008. Pinnacle Entertainment Group presented The Wild Hunt (2011) as a "Savage Worlds Test Drive" at the Free RPG Day 2011.

Shannon Appelcline outlined that Columbia Games published two adventures for Free RPG Days, Field of Daisies in 2008 and Dead Weight in 2010, but noted that "the latter product was more a teaser than anything. Stores only received one copy of the adventure when they purchased a box of Free RPG Day products; Columbia has since started selling the rest of the print run — and even admonished websites that reviewed Dead Weight as a 'free' release. More recently they produced a map of Hârn (2012) for Free RPG Day 2012."

== Related events ==
Germany's first event was February 2, 2013; it included 9 games. The German version of Free RPG Day is called Gratisrollenspieltag, also known as Gratis Rollenspieltag.

== Participation ==
The industry participants include the publishers of the participating games, the event organizer which coordinates delivery of the free product to the stores, and the brick-and-mortar store owners who agree to provide the free games to end users/gamers. Some publishers produce quick start adventures geared toward players unfamiliar with the game system or new to tabletop role-playing games in general. The games are distributed worldwide through participating stores.

=== The 1st annual Free RPG Day (June 23, 2007) ===
The first annual event in 2007 featured quick start adventures from 16 different publishers:

- Call of Cthulhu (6th Edition) Quick Start
- Castles & Crusades (SIEGE Engine system) Quick Start Rules
- Castles & Crusades gazetteer "Imperial Town of Tell Qa" // Wilderlands of High Fantasy setting
- Changeling: The Lost Free Rules and Adventure "Dwelling in Darkness"
- The Chronicles of Ramlar adventure "Black Arrow Run"
- d20 System 3.5 Edition (Game Mastery series) adventure D0: Hollow's Last Hope // 1st level, Golarion setting - The prequel to the "D" (Dungeon) series modules.
- Vajra Enterprises In Dark Alleys adventure "Little Boy Lost"
- d20 System 3.5 Edition Bits of Magicka: Pocket Items - A list of twenty targets for pickpockets, plus the mundane or magical items they might be carrying.
- Goodman Games Dungeon Crawl Classics / Dungeons & Dragons (3.5 Edition) adventure DCC #51.5: The Sinister Secret of Whiterock.
- Goodman Games Dungeons & Dragons (3.5 Edition) adventure "Wicked Fantasy Factory #0: Temple of Blood" // 1st level Wicked Fantasy Factory setting - A prequel to Wicked Fantasy Factory #1: Rumble in the Wizard’s Tower. The Wicked Fantasy Factory setting adds cinematic play rules to Dungeons & Dragons.
- Mongoose RuneQuest (MRQ) adventure "Fisticuffs at O'Leary's Place" - A short adventure for use with Mongoose Publishing's licensed version of RuneQuest.
- Mutants & Masterminds Beginner's Guide
- Septimus Quickstart (D6 System (2nd Edition)) - A teaser for a Science Fiction roleplaying game that was supposed to premiere in 2008. It was later cancelled by West End Games.
- Tunnels & Trolls solitaire adventure "Goblin Lake"
- Warhammer Fantasy Roleplay adventure "The Pig, the Witch and Her Lover"
- Xcrawl "Xcrawl - Dungeonbattle Brooklyn" - An adventure set in the Xcrawl universe, in which adventurers are modern-day athletes (X-crawlers) competing in dungeon obstacle courses to win loot on a televised gameshow.

=== The 2nd annual Free RPG Day (June 21, 2008) ===
This event took place on June 21, 2008. The second annual event featured:

- Castlemourn Quickstart
- Castles & Crusades (SIEGE Engine system) Quick Start Rules 2008 and adventure "Dwarven Glory" // Castle Zagyg setting
- Cthulhu Live (3rd Edition) adventure "Murder at Miskatonic"
- d20 System 3.5 Edition (Game Mastery series) adventure D1.5: Revenge of the Kobold King // 5th level, Golarion setting - Sequel to D1: Crown of the Kobold King (2007).
- Dungeon Crawl Classics / Dungeons & Dragons (4th Edition) gazetteer "Punjar: The Tarnished Jewel" - details the decadent city of Punjar.
- Dungeons & Dragons (4th Edition) adventure "Treasure of Talon Pass".
- HârnMaster adventure "Field of Daisies".
- Heirs to Olympia Quickstart Rules
- Hollow Earth Expedition Free RPG Day Quickstart Rules & Adventure 2008 "Stranded in the Hollow Earth"
- Hunter: The Vigil Free Rules and Adventure
- Iron Heroes RPG (2nd Edition) adventure "Bloodwood"
- A Song of Ice and Fire Roleplaying Quickstart Rules
- StarSIEGE: Event Horizon (SIEGE Engine system) Introductory Manual - Science-fiction and Cyberpunk roleplaying game.
- Trail of Cthulhu (GUMSHOE system) adventure "The Murderer of Thomas Fell"
- Traveller (Mongoose 1st Edition) Book 0: An Introduction to Traveller (Free RPG Day Quickstart Rules edition) - Mongoose Publishing's licensed update of GDW's Traveller. Uses Classic Traveller's 2D6 dice system.
- Tunnels & Trolls 5.5 Edition GM adventure "Take the Money"

=== The 3rd annual Free RPG Day (June 20, 2009) ===
Games included in the third Free RPG Day event were:

- Pathfinder RPG "Bonus Bestiary"
- Paranoia RPG "A Citizen's Guide to Surviving Alpha Complex"
- Dragon Warriors Introductory Book
- Rogue Trader RPG (Warhammer 40,000 roleplaying game) Quick Start Rules and adventure "Forsaken Bounty"
- Geist: The Sin-Eaters Free Quickstart Rules and adventure "The Return of Mr. Monster"
- Corporation RPG adventure "Grab the Cache"
- Hollow Earth Expedition Free RPG Day Quickstart Rules & Adventure 2009 "Kidnapped in the Hollow Earth."
- Dungeons & Dragons (4th Edition) adventures "Immortal Heroes" / "Hearts of Chaos"
- Dungeons & Dragons (4th Edition) "Khyber's Harvest"
- Sword and Sorcery Studios Free RPG Day 2009: PDF Adjunct
1. Generic map set "The Ice Temple" (PDF)
2. Arcana Evolved / Dungeons & Dragons (3.5 Edition); Lands of the Diamond Throne setting: magical items supplement "Items Evolved: Rituals" (PDF)
3. Arcana Evolved: bestiary supplement "Mythical Monstrosities" (PDF)
4. Dungeons & Dragons (4th Edition); Feudal Lords setting: 9th level adventure "Oracle of Orcas" (PDF)

=== The 4th annual Free RPG Day (June 19, 2010) ===
This event took place on June 19, 2010.

- Call of Cthulhu (6th Edition) adventure "Abomination of the Amazon"
- Castles & Crusades 2010 Quick Start Rules
- Deathwatch RPG (Warhammer 40,000 roleplaying game) adventure "Final Sanction" (Sequence 1) - Things are not right on the planet of Landsholm...
- Dungeons & Dragons "Bloodsand Arena"
- Exalted (2nd Edition) basic rules and adventure "Under the Rose"
- HârnMaster (3rd Edition) basic rules and adventure "Dead Weight"
- Heroes Forever Free RPG Day Package - Shrinkwrapped package containing two booklets: a superhero miniatures rulebook and a basic adventure booklet "The Shelter".
- Hollow Earth Expedition Free RPG Day Adventure 2010: "A Nightmare at the Museum." (Ubiquity RPG Quickstart Rules)
- Legend of the Five Rings RPG adventure "Legacy of Disaster"
- Pathfinder adventure "Master of the Fallen Fortress" (1st level: Absalom)
- Prime Directive (Star Trek roleplaying game) adventure "The Dread Pirate Aldo" (both d20 Modern (Prime Directive d20 Modern) and GURPS (4th Edition) (GURPS Prime Directive) rules)
- Roll d-Infinity magazine (Issue #0: The Shape of Things to Come) - Sample issue of a new multi-platform role-playing game magazine.

=== The 5th annual Free RPG Day (June 18, 2011) ===
- Dice Tower
- Commemorative Dice For Store Owner
- Unique Elven-themed Dice
- All Flesh Must Be Eaten (Unisystem) Quickstart & Adventure
- Arcanis RPG Quickstart & Adventure
- Aspect Quickstart Adventure
- Black Crusade RPG (Warhammer 40,000 roleplaying game) Quickstart and Adventure
- Castles & Crusades Quickstart and Adventure
- Settlers of Catan: Catanimal Variant rules - single page paper insert
- Dungeon Crawl Classics RPG Quickstart
- Dungeons & Dragons (4th Edition) "Domain of Dread: Histhaven" - Supplement to the box set "The Shadowfell: Gloomwrought and Beyond"
- DragonAge Quickstart
- Hollow Earth Expedition Free RPG Day Quickstart Rules & Adventure 2011 "Trapped in the Aircraft Graveyard."
- Pathfinder RPG adventure "We Be Goblins!"
- Prime Directive (Star Trek roleplaying game) adventure "Starship Aldo" (both d20 Modern & GURPS)
- Savage Worlds Quickstart & Adventure "The Wild Hunt"
- Stellar Horizons Quickstart
- Tunnels & Trolls solitaire adventure "Rescue Mission" and GM adventure "Riverboat Adventure"
- World of Darkness Quickstart
- X-treme Dungeon Mastery (XD20 System) campaign setting "Laser Squid Nemesis" - A setting in which the characters are sentient sealife who live in a modern technological aquatic world "with undersea cars, phones, and... well, lasers!"

=== The 6th annual Free RPG Day (June 16, 2012) ===
Games included in the sixth Free RPG Day event were:

- Catalyst Game Labs BattleTech: A Time of War (1st Edition) / Shadowrun (5th Edition) Quick-Start Rules Flipbook (Battletech: A Time of War on one side, Shadowrun on the other side)
- Brass & Steel: A Game of Steampunk Adventure LARP Quick-Start Rules and adventure "The Case of the Croquet Mallet"
- Conspiracy X Introductory Game Kit and adventure "Convoy"
- Cosmic Patrol Roleplaying Game Quick-Start Rules and adventure "The Kahn Protocol"
- Pathfinder Roleplaying Game adventure "Dawn of the Scarlet Sun"
- Dungeons & Dragons (4th Edition) adventure "Dead in the Eye"
- Dungeon Crawl Classics Free RPG Day 2012 adventures "The Jeweller That Dealt In Stardust" and "The Undulating Corruption"
- Hârnmaster Hârn Setting Material with World Map
- Castles & Crusades adventure "In Search of Adventure"
- Pathfinder Roleplaying Game adventure "Shadowsfall: The Temple of Orcus"
- Pathfinder Roleplaying Game adventure "Slavers of the Sunken Garden"
- Pathfinder Roleplaying Game adventure "Undying Legacy of the First Ones"

=== The 7th annual Free RPG Day (June 15, 2013) ===
This event took place on June 15, 2013.

- Catalyst Game Labs BattleTech: A Time of War (1st Edition) / Shadowrun (5th Edition) Quick-Start Rules Flipbook (Battletech: A Time of War on one side, Shadowrun on the other side)
- Lamentations of the Flame Princess (3rd Edition) adventure "Better than Any Man" (Rated Ages 18+)
- Cosmic Patrol Roleplaying Game Quick-Start Rules and adventure "The Eiger Agenda"
- Deluxe Tunnels & Trolls Preview Pack
- Dungeon Crawl Classics rules ("The Imperishable Sorceress") / Maximum X-Crawl ("Studio City Xcrawl")
- Swords & Wizardry adventure "Hall of Bones"
- Castles & Crusades adventure "A Pot of Broken Bones (& Halfling Broth)"
- Vampire: The Requiem adventure "Reap the Whirlwind"
- Star Wars Roleplaying Game: Edge of the Empire Basic Rules and adventure "Under a Black Sun"
- Pathfinder Roleplaying Game adventure "Temple of the Forbidden God"
- Pathfinder Roleplaying Game adventure "We Be Goblins Too!" - Sequel to the 2011 adventure "We be Goblins"

=== The 8th annual Free RPG Day (June 21, 2014) ===
This event took place on June 21, 2014. Games included in the 8th annual event were:

- Catalyst Game Labs BattleTech: A Time of War (1st Edition) / Shadowrun (5th Edition) Quick-Start Rules Flipbook (Battletech: A Time of War adventure "Character Assassination" on one side, Shadowrun adventure "Spoiled Rotten" on the other side)
- Cosmic Patrol Roleplaying Game Quick-Start Rules and adventure "The Continuance Contingency"
- Lamentations of the Flame Princess adventure "The Doom Cave of the Crystal-Headed Children"
- Castles & Crusades adventure "A Druid's Lament"
- The Godsfall RPG Demo
- Goodman Games Free RPG Day 2014 Dungeon Crawl Classics adventure "Elzemon and the Blood-Drinking Box" and Maximum XCrawl adventure "Dungeon Detonation"
- Mage: The Ascension Introductory Quickstart Rules and Adventure Hooks
- 13th Age adventure "Make Your Own Luck" - Prequel to Eyes of the Stone Thief campaign
- Pathfinder Roleplaying Game adventure "Risen from the Sands"
- Time Travel Dinosaur: Mesozoic Mayhem
- Valiant Universe RPG Quick Start Rules: Experience the Harbinger Wars

=== The 9th annual Free RPG Day (June 20, 2015) ===
This event took place on June 20, 2015. Products included in the 9th annual event were:

- Pelgrane Press flipbook 13th Age adventure "At Land's Edge" / Night's Black Agents adventure "The Harker Intrusion"
- Catalyst Game Labs BattleTech: A Time of War (1st Edition) / Shadowrun (5th Edition) Quick-Start Rules Flipbook (Battletech: A Time of War on one side, Shadowrun on the other side)
- Cosmic Patrol Roleplaying Game Quick-Start Rules and adventure "The Doomsday Protocols"
- Dungeon Crawl Classics Judge's Screen
- Hellas Free RPG Day Quickstart
- Goodman Games Fifth Edition Fantasy adventure "Into the Dragon's Maw"
- Pathfinder Roleplaying Game Player Character SoundSets (giftcard with codes for sound effect packs from Syrinscape)
- Atlantis: The Second Age Quick-Start Rules and adventure "Prelude to Adventure"
- Through the Breach Quick-Start Rules and adventure "Recruitment Drive"
- Castles & Crusades adventure "Shadows of a Green Sky"
- Valiant Universe RPG Quick Start Rules: Experience the Rumble in the Bay
- Pathfinder Roleplaying Game adventure "We Be Goblins Free!"
- Kobolds Ate My Baby! Quick-Start Rules and adventure "You Iz Kobolds?!"

=== The 10th annual Free RPG Day (June 18, 2016) ===
This event took place on June 18, 2016. Products included in the 10th annual event were:

- Sasquatch Game Studio: Primeval Thule adventure "Acropolis of Voor Darayn" (D&D 5E)
- Khepera Publishing: Atlantis: The Second Age – Free RPG Day Prelude to Adventure quick-start rules
- Ulisses Spiele: The Dark Eye Quick-Start Rules (Free RPG Day 2016 Version)
- Chaosium: Call of Cthulhu (7th Edition) adventure "The Derelict"
- Dan Coleman Productions: Dungeons on Demand F1L1: Cryptic Entry (adventure for D&D 5E)
- Burning Games: "Escape from Alfadabin" quick-start rules and an adventure seed for Faith: The Sci-Fi RPG
- Gaming Paper LLC: Gaming Paper Adventure Maps: Mega Dungeon 4 - Rooftops and Alleyways (Sample Pack)
- Atlas Games: Feng Shui 2 quick-start rules and adventure "Hong Kong Task Force 88"
- Goodman Games: Dungeon Crawl Classics Lankhmar adventure "The Madhouse Meet" / Mutant Crawl Classics adventure "The Museum at the End of Time"
- Wyrd Games: Through the Breach quick-start rules and adventure "Sixteen Tons"
- Lamentations of the Flame Princess: LotFP "Slugs!" bestiary
- Pelgrane Press: 13th Age adventure "Swords Against the Dead"/Night's Black Agents adventure "The Van Helsing Letter" (flipbook)
- Troll Lord Games: Castles & Crusades/Amazing Adventures adventure "Under the Blood Red Moon"
- Catalyst Game Labs:Valiant Universe RPG Quick Start Rules: Experience the Fog of War!
- Paizo: Pathfinder adventure "We B4 Goblins!"

=== The 11th annual Free RPG Day (June 17, 2017) ===
This event took place on June 17, 2017. Products included in the 11th annual event were:

- 13th Age/TimeWatch quickstart
- Apartment 11a
- Conan Free RPG Day Extra Characters
- Dissonant Notes
- Dungeon Crawl Classics quickstart and level 1 adventure Gnole House
- Shintiara RPG introductory scenario "Geometrie del Tempo"
- Inzan
- Isometric Gaming Paper
- The Ninja Crusade Second Edition quickstart
- Penny Dreadful One Shot: Earthly Desires
- The Pit of Kutallu
- Runequest quickstart and adventure
- Sample RPG Status Tokens
- The Spire of the Hunting Sound
- Starfinder First Contact
- Torg Eternity Free RPG Day Special
- Vaginas Are Magic!

=== The 12th annual Free RPG Day (June 16, 2018) ===
This event took place on June 16, 2018. Products included in the 11th annual event were:

- Numenera adventure "Ashes of the Sea"
- Overlight adventure "Birthright of Khar-Ulan"
- Wrath and Glory adventure "Blessings Unheralded"
- Cthulhu Confidential adventure "A Cable's Length from Shore"/The Fall of Delta Green adventure "On a Bank by Moonlight"
- Cazadores
- Dungeon Crawl Classics quickstart and level 2 adventure “Man-Bait for the Soul Stealer”
- Dungeons & Dragons Ultra-Pro Character Folio
- Lamentations of the Flame Princess adventure "Eldritch Cock"
- Fifth Edition Fantasy #14: Beneath the Keep
- Kids on Bikes quickstart
- Unknown Armies adventure "Maria in Three Parts"
- Midnight Legion solo adventure "Last Recruit"
- Through the Breach Penny Dreadful One-Shot adventure "The Show Must Go On"
- Call of Cthulhu adventure "Scritch Scratch"
- Starfinder Adventure "Skitter Shot"
- Starsea Chronicles: Gold Hawk Light Freighter
- The Sword of Rami
- T&T Adventures Japan mini-rules, "Adventures in Tunnels & Trolls" manga and "Coming Down the Mountain" solo adventure
- Pathfinder Adventure "We Be 5uper Goblins!"

=== The 13th annual Free RPG Day (June 15, 2019) ===
This event took place on June 15, 2019. Products included in the 13th annual event were:

- Steamforged Games: Animal Adventures: Tales of Dungeons & Doggies adventure "Raiders of the Lost Bark"
- Goodman Games: Dungeon Crawl Classics quickstart and 0 level adventure "Geas of the Star-Chons"
- Ultra Pro: Dungeons & Dragons playmat
- Campaign Games: Forts & Frontiers quickstart and adventure "The Feast of the Dead"
- Seven Thebes: Land of Myths: Age of Palaces playtest module
- Green Ronin Publishing : Modern AGE quickstart "Threefold"
- Khepera Publishing: Mythic D6 quickstart
- Renegade Game Studios/Hunters Entertainment: Outbreak: Undead intro manual
- Paizo Publishing: Starfinder adventure "Skitter Crash"
- Paizo Publishing: Starfinder Dice
- Renegade Game Studios/Hunters Entertainment: Kids on Bikes Strange Adventures! "The House on Poplar Court"
- Studio 9 Incorporated: Treasures & Traps: The Adventure Story Game
- Paizo Publishing: Pathfinder module "We Be Heroes?"
- R. Talsorian Games: The Witcher "Easy Mode" introductory booklet

=== The 14th annual Free RPG Day (2020) ===
This event took place on July 25, 2020. Products included in the 14th annual event were:

- Goodman Games: Dungeon Crawl Classics quickstart and adventure
- Mantic Games/Dave Taylor Miniatures: How to Paint a Library instructional booklet
- Hit Point Press: Humblewood adventure " The Wakewyrm's Fury"
- Renegade Games Studios/Hunters Entertainment/Oni Games/Infectious Play Publishing: Junior Braves Survival Guide to the Apocalypse quickstart
- Renegade Games Studios/Hunters Entertainment/Infectious Play Publishing: Kids on Brooms free edition
- 9th Level Games: Level 1 Volume 1 indie RPG anthology
- Paizo Publishing: Pathfinder 2E adventure "Little Trouble in Big Absalom"
- Renegade Game Studios: Overlight RPG adventure "The Lost Spire of Tziuhquatl"
- Fantasy Flight Games: Keyforge: Secrets of the Crucible adventure "Maw of Abraxas"
- Cubicle 7: Warhammer 40,000 Roleplay Wrath & Glory adventure "Rain of Mercy"
- Leder Games/Magpie Games: Root RPG Pellenicky Glade quickstart
- Paizo Publishing: Starfinder adventure "Skitter Home"

=== The 15th annual Free RPG Day (2021) ===
This event took place on October 16, 2021. Products included in the 15th annual event were:

- Modiphius Entertainment: Achtung! Cthulhu quickstart and adventure "A Quick Trip to France"
- EDGE Studios: Twilight Imperium RPG adventure "Ashes of Power"
- Green Ronin Publishing: Blue Rose quickstart
- Privateer Press: Iron Kingdoms adventure "An Echo in the Darkness"
- Renegade Game Studios: Essence20 adventure "Enter the Collection" (fully compatible with the Power Rangers, GI Joe, and Transformers RPGs)
- Steamforged Games: Epic Encounters adventure "The Hills have Legs"
- Need Games/Rooster Games: Fabula Ultima Press Start quickstart
- Mantic Games/Dave Taylor Miniatures: How to Build a Boss-Fight Final Chamber instructional booklet
- Hit Point Press: Humblewood adventure "The Heart of Dako"/Big Bad Booklet "Zara Harlowe"
- Infinite Black: Vast Grimm adventure "Into the Würmhole"
- 9th Level Games: Level 1 Volume 2 "We all Wear Masks" indie RPG anthology
- Cubicle 7 Entertainment: Warhammer Roleplay Soulbound adventure "Reap and Sow"
- Leder Games/Magpie Games: Root RPG Bertram's Cove quickstart
- Modiphius Entertainment: Star Trek Adventures quickstart
- Paizo Publishing: Starfinder adventure "The Starfinder Four vs The Hardlight Harlequin"
- Goodman Games: Dark Tower adventure "The Sunken Temple of Set"
- Pegasus Spiele: Talisman Adventures adventure "Tales of the Realm: Curse of the Rat Queen"
- Paizo Publishing: Pathfinder adventure "Threshold of Knowledge"
- Goodman Games: Dungeon Crawl Classics adventure "Tomb of the Savage Kings"
- Cubicle 7 Entertainment: Victoriana adventure "Going Underground"
- Modiphius Entertainment: Dune: Adventures in the Imperium quickstart "Wormsign"
- CMON: Zombicide: Chronicles mission booklet

=== The 16th annual Free RPG Day (2022) ===
This event took place on June 25, 2022 (in North America) and July 23, 2022 (everywhere else). Products included in the 16th annual event were:

- Lion Forge/Oni Games: Rolled & Told Volume 1
- Loke Battle Mats: 5E adventure "Curse of the Dead Marsh Crew"
- R. Talsorian Games: Cyberpunk RED Easy Mode quickstart
- Goodman Games: Dungeon Crawl Classics adventure "Danger in the Air"
- Steamforged Games: Epic Encounters adventure "Bridge of the Duergar Cult"
- Darrington Press: A Familiar Problem one-page RPG
- Paizo Publishing: Pathfinder adventure "A Fistful of Flowers"
- Modiphius Entertainment: Homeworld Revelations quickstart
- Mantic Games/Dave Taylor Miniatures: How to Raise the Dead instruction booklet
- Privateer Press: Iron Kingdoms adventure "A Strange Light Breaks"
- Level 9 Games: Level 1 Volume 3 indie RPG anthology
- Leder Games/Magpie Games: Root RPG Talon Hill quickstart
- Paizo Publishing: Starfinder adventure "Skitter Warp"
- Goodman Games: 5E adventure "The Three-Wizard Conundrum"

=== The 17th annual Free RPG Day (2023) ===
This event took place on June 24, 2023. Products included in the 17th annual event were:

- EDGE Studios: Adventures in Rokugan adventure "Storm Eel's Rest"
- Steamforged Games: Animal Adventures adventure "Apocalypse Miaow"
- Renegade Game Studios: Transformers/GI Joe crossover adventure "Cobra/Con"
- Free League Publishing: Dragonbane quickstart and adventure "Riddermound"
- Paizo Publishing: Pathfinder adventure "A Few Flowers More"
- Van Ryder Games: Graphic Novel Adventures sample chapter of "Loup Garou"
- Wet Ink Games: Heckin' Good Doggos adventure "Someone's Last Day at the Track"
- Loke Battle Mats: 5E adventure "Heist at the Museum"
- Level 9 Games: Level 1 Volume 4 indie RPG anthology
- Pelgrane Press: Swords of the Serpentine adventure "Losing Face"
- 9th Level Games: Mazes zero-prep intro module
- Dragon Shield: Monster Cards, Mini Adventure, and Pocket RPG Guide
- Magpie Games: Avatar Legends adventure "Movers & Shakers"
- Modiphius Entertainment: Achtung! Cthulhu adventure "Operation Kindling"
- Goodman Games: Dungeon Crawl Classics adventure "Piercing the Demon's Eye"
- Leder Games/Magpie Games: Root RPG Hacksaw Dell quickstart
- Paizo Publishing: Starfinder adventure "Operation Seaside Park"
- Renegade Game Studios: Vampire: The Masquerade adventure "A Taste of the Moon"
- CMON: Zombicide: Chronicles Day 2 mission booklet "Car Crush" and "Oliver Twisted"
- WizKids: Dungeons & Dragons: Onslaught scenario "Never Split the Party"
- Smirk & Dagger Games: Adventure Party quickstart "The Savage Lands"
- Hachette Board Games: Critical: Foundation "Episode 0"

=== The 18th annual Free RPG Day (2024) ===
This event will take place on June 22, 2024, products announced for the 18th annual event are:

- 1985 Games: Obojima adventure "Mayhem in Okiri Village"
- 9th Level Games: Level 1 Volume 5 indie RPG anthology
- 9th Level Games: Return to Dark Tower/Mazes adventure "Sword of the Brigand King"
- BCW: Free RPG Day Dice Tray and Dice Bag
- CMON: Assassin's Creed RPG
- CMON: Zombicide: Chronicles adventure "Road to Haven"
- CMON: Plaguebearer RPG
- CMON: Blood Rage RPG
- Crimson Herald: SInk! Treasures of Deep Grotto
- Dispel DIce: Free RPG Day 2024 Rococo Red Iconic D20 3-Piece Dice Set
- Foam Brain Games: Lost Tome of Monsters variant pinature, metal d20 and encounter
- Free League Publishing: Dragonbane adventure "The Sinking Tower"
- Goodman Games: Dungeon Crawl Classics adventure "Across the Veil of Time"
- Hit Point Press: Humblewood adventure "Shock in Stormcrag"
- Kobold Press: Tales of the Valiant adventure "Shards of the Spellforge"
- Loke Battle Mats: 5E adventure "Not a Drop to Drink"
- Loot Tavern: 5E adventure "The Shining Shrine" (preview of Heliana's Guide to Monster Hunting)
- Lucky Duck Games: Paper App Dungeon 4 unique levels
- Magpie Games: Avatar Legends dice and adventure "Rebels & Refugees"
- Marvel: Marvel Multiverse RPG X-Men expansion preview
- Need Games: Terror Target Gemini RPG adventure "Rojo: A Kurosawa Inspirerd Bloodshed"
- Nord Games: RPG Accessory Decks
- Paizo Publishing: Pathfinder adventure "The Great Toy Heist"
- Paizo Publishing: Starfinder adventure "Second Contact"
- R. Talsorian Games: Shadow Scar adventure "Eyes in the Darkness"
- Red Raven: Arzium RPG quickstart
- Renegade Game Studios: Werewolf the Apocalypse adventure "Red Tundra"
- Renegade Game Studios: GI Joe, Transformers, Power Rangers and My LIttle Pony RPG adventure "Unnatural Disaster"
- Roll & Play Press: 5E sample adventures from One Shot Wonders
- Roll20: complimentary Roll20 subscription and exclusive playable content
- Rowan, Rook & Decard: The Hollows quickstart
- Sirius Dice: Legend of Drizzt Dice Set
- Steamforged Games: Runescape Kingdoms RPG quickstart
- The Story Engine: Story Engine Deck
- Studio Agate: Shadows of Esteren quickstart
- Wet Ink Games: Garbage & Glory: Trashrun quickstart
- WizKids: Dungeons & Dragons Icons of the Realms Topaz Dragon Wyrmling, Strahd, and Amethyst Dragon Wyrmling
