= Stephen Daniele =

Artist

Stephen A. Daniele is an artist whose work has appeared in role-playing games.

== Works ==
Stephen Daniele has continued to produce interior illustrations for many Dungeons & Dragons books and Dragon magazine since 1995, as well as cover art for Windriders of the Jagged Cliffs (1995), the Dark Sun Campaign Setting (1995), and Den of Thieves (1996). He has also produced artwork for other games including Extreme Vengeance (Archangel Entertainment), Sovereign Stone (Sovereign Press, Inc), and Hollow Earth Expedition (Exile Studios), and illustrated cards for the Magic: The Gathering collectible card game.

Daniele was nominated for a Chesley Award, for Best Monochrome Work – Unpublished, in 1999, for his work "Griffon Rider".
