= Death in Luxor =

Death in Luxor is a 2008 role-playing game adventure published by Goodman Games for Call of Cthulhu.

== Plot summary ==
Death in Luxor is an adventure in which a primordial evil once buried by Ramesses III is unleashed by 1920s archaeologists, plunging Luxor into a new era of cosmic horror that challenges investigators to survive mysteries and terrors older than history itself.

== Reviews ==
- Black Gate
- Rebel Times #24
- The Unspeakable Oath #19 (March, 2011)

== See also ==
- Card game
- Board game
