= Starfinder Pact Worlds =

Starfinder RPG sourcebook

- Authors: Alexander Augunas, Jason Bulmahn, John Compton, Amanda Hamon Kunz, Thurston Hillman, Jason Keeley
- Genre: Role-playing games
- Publisher: Paizo
- Publication date: 28 March 2018
- Media type: Print (hardcover)
- Pages: 216
- ISBN: 978-1-64078-022-4

Starfinder Pact Worlds is a sourcebook for Starfinder Roleplaying Game published in 2018. The book describes in detail the fictional setting of Pact Worlds, also introducing new options for players.

The cover artist is Remko Troost.

== Contents ==
=== Welcome to the Pact Worlds ===
Chapter is about history, government and economy of Pact Worlds.

=== Chapter 1: The Worlds ===
Parts in "The Worlds" -chapter contain map of world they describe, present descriptions of locations therein and a character theme connected to that world. Character themes introduced in this chapter are Solar Disciple, Roboticist, Wild Warden, Corporate Agent, Gladiator, Cyberborn, Tempered Pilgrim, Space Pirate, Death-Touched, Dragonblood, Dream Prophet, Biotechnician, Xenoarchaeologist and Cultist.

=== Chapter 2: Starships ===
Starships introduced in this chapter include Aballonian, Hellknight, Iomedaean, Vercite and Xenowarden ships. New systems, which can be installed to ship, include a Brig and Hydrophonic garden.

=== Chapter 3: Supporting Cast ===
Chapter "Supporting Cast" contains descriptions of various Pact worlds organizations and non-player characters. Stat blocks for non-player characters of various classes presented are cultists, free captains, hellknights, mercenaries, security forces, and street gangs. Each section has few tips how these blocks can be used and altered.

=== Chapter 4: Player Options ===
In addition to character themes in previous chapter, this chapter presents character archetypes, feats, equipment, spells, and playable races. Archetypes are Arcanamirium sage, divine champion, Skyfire centurion, star knight, Starfinder data jockey, and Steward officer. Races are shapeshifting Astrazoans, Bantrids, plant race Khizars, undead Borai and SROs (sentient robotic organisms).

== Reception ==
According to Roll for Combat review, Pact Worlds has the most to offer for Game masters who write their own stories. Content within may overlap with official Paizo Adventure Paths. D20diaries praised artwork as "awesome" and "consistently spectacular". One critic was disappointed by lack of vehicles in the equipment section.

Year	Award	Category	Work	Result	Ref.
2018	ENNIE Awards	Best Cartography	Starfinder Pact Worlds	Silver Award	
