= Vajra Enterprises =

- Type: Private
- Industry: Role-playing game publisher
- Founded: 2001; 25 years ago
- Headquarters: Hillsboro, Oregon, USA
- Key people: Brian St.Claire-King
- Products: Fates Worse Than Death, Tibet, In Dark Alleys, KidWorld, Hoodoo Blues, Seeker
- Website: www.vajraenterprises.com

Vajra Enterprises, founded in 2001, is a publishing company which produces tabletop role-playing games. Vajra's games have a reputation for taking the conventions of more traditional genres and turning them around, into something familiar yet different. For example, at the beginning of Fates Worse than Death, there is a page-long list of features differentiating it from traditional cyberpunk. Vajra strives to create very specific and detailed game settings, as opposed to many other companies which strive to create generic settings with wide appeal.

== Game System ==
All Vajra Enterprises releases are based on the Organic Rule Components system, also known as ORC. The publisher offers free licenses to use the ORC system on approval of the subject matter by Vajra Enterprises. The ORC game mechanics have been criticized by reviewers as being too "crunchy". When used in a game system review, the term "crunchy" indicates relatively complex and number-driven game mechanics.

== Game products ==
Vajra Enterprises' releases include published books and several games available for download as pdf files.

=== Fates Worse Than Death ===
Fates Worse Than Death is a cyberpunk game which takes place on a fictional Manhattan in the year 2080, where decades of global crisis and war has crippled the city's economic and social structure. The city is plagued with poverty, crime, diseases, and corruption, making it one of the most dangerous ghettos in the world. Players take the role of characters belonging to a new generation of people, characterized by the belief that no one but themselves are willing to save them. Tired of wasting their lives in fear, this group aims toward forming new communities and testing new technology to make the city a better and safer place to live. Even though this group's fights and accomplishments help the city get better, often its members also have to deal with their own personal problems, usually related to drugs, violence, or mental illness.

Behind the Eyes of Madness is a supplemental book for the Fates Worse Than Death game world which contains special rules for characters with mental illnesses.

Price of Power (working title) is a supplemental book for the Fates Worse Than Death game world. As of 08-28-2014 it has reached playtesting stage.

=== Tibet: The Roleplaying Game ===
Tibet: The Roleplaying Game is set in Tibet c. 1959, during the Chinese invasion of Tibet which began in 1950. It is properly categorized as historical fantasy because it is set in a technologically accurate version of 1950s Tibet, but it incorporates magic and mythical creatures. Tibetan cultural and religious practices from ancient Bön to Tibetan Buddhism are brought into game play such that characters can interact with physical manifestations of traditional Tibetan mythical beings and locations. For example, players may encounter a wrathful dharmapala or visit Shambala.

Tibet was released in July 2004. In 2009, the publishing house Maqui Edicions published two translations of the game: first (in April) into Catalan under the name Tibet, el joc de rol and then (in September) into Spanish under the name Tíbet, el juego de rol.

=== In Dark Alleys ===
In Dark Alleys is a modern psychological horror game set in Los Angeles. Like the roleplaying game Kult, it has a gnostic cosmological backdrop. A game scenario for In Dark Alleys was included with the Free RPG Day materials in 2007.

=== KidWorld ===
KidWorld features a post-apocalyptic setting in which children are the only fully functional humans left on Earth.

=== Hoodoo Blues ===
Hoodoo Blues is a horror/history genre game based on the myth and history of America's Deep South. It is set in the modern day Deep South, which includes Louisiana, Georgia, Mississippi, Alabama, South Carolina, and parts of Florida and Texas. Game play may include flashbacks to earlier decades of the characters' lives. A player will typically take on the role of a minority character (usually African American) who has found a way to stave off death for decades. The game universe is based on the premise that voodoo and hoodoo philosophies and magic are real, and that minority groups have learned to harness these powers to resist the effects of struggles including discrimination, slavery, and the Civil War. Hoodoo Blues has been praised for the "depth and vitality" of the setting and history section in particular.

=== Seeker ===
Seeker is a game set in the modern day small-town America. The characters are rural mystics seeking their own brand of enlightenment. They may come from every walk of life: humble Christian monks, passionate artists, logical scientists, intense shamans, martial artists are all examples from the book, and there can easily be more. They might have studied various philosophies and mystical systems for years before embarking on the path, others just woke up one morning and decided to make a change. What they all have in common is that each has decided to throw himself or herself headfirst into the search for wisdom, self-improvement and power - and rather than pursuing one specific dogma, they will travel the world learning from every person and every experience, in essence letting the universe teach them what it will. Each has developed powerful abilities and each has discovered that the world is a much more complicated, much more dangerous and much more wonderful place than they had ever imagined. The rules of the game are those of ORC-L, the lite version of Organic Rule Components, designed for quick character creation and light or live action play. The game also contains extensive information on small-town America and the secrets and dangers one may find there.
