= Joseph Goodman (game designer) =

American game designer

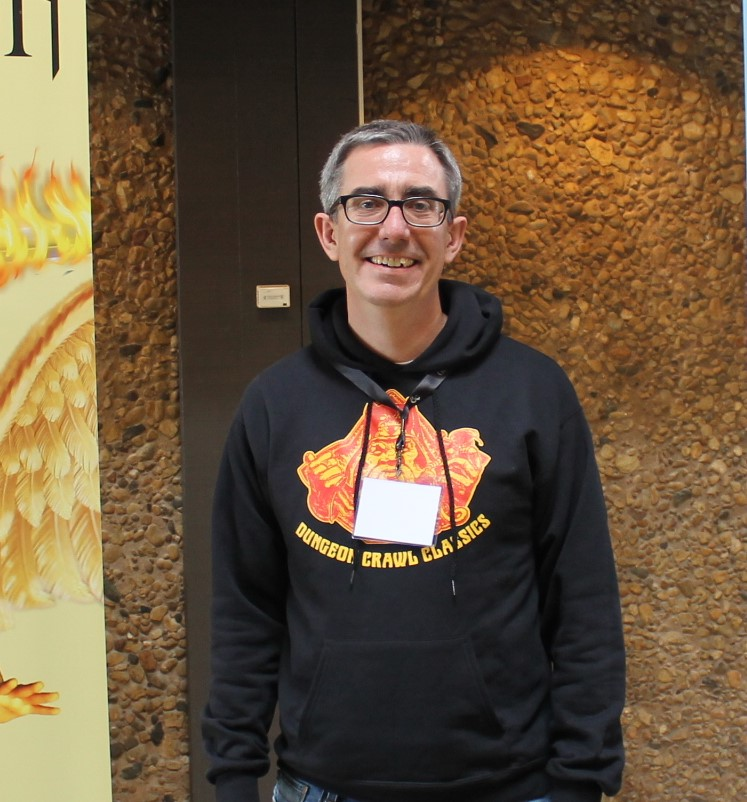
- Goodman at Gary Con X1 in 2019
- Born: United States
- Occupations: Writer, game designer
- Writing career
- Genre: Role-playing games

Joseph Goodman is a role-playing game designer and the owner of Goodman Games. He is best known for the d20 adventure series, Dungeon Crawl Classics and the Dungeon Crawl Classics Role Playing Game.

== Career ==
Joseph Goodman has worked as a professional in the gaming field since self-publishing The Dark Library in 1994, a fanzine for his interest in miniatures games such as Warhammer 40k. Heartbreaker Hobbies & Games later hired him to be the editor-in-chief of their publication, Forge: The Magazine of Miniature Gaming.

Goodman then started his own game publishing company, Goodman Games, with his first RPG being Broncosaurus Rex (2001). Despite success with Broncosaurus Rex and then moving to fantasy dungeon crawls, Goodman did not hire any in-house game designers and worked with creators freelance instead. Goodman started publishing the Dungeon Crawl Classics line in 2003, with the intent to publish intelligent dungeon crawl adventures like those he enjoyed playing, and he wanted to serve the large part of the demographic market made up of older gamers. Goodman also developed the Dragonmech setting, which he released in 2004 under the Sword and Sorcery Studios imprint of White Wolf.

== Works ==
Writing credits include:

- Dungeon Crawl Classics Role Playing Game (2012), creator and writer
- Steam Warriors (Dragonmech) (2005), author
- Aerial Adventure Guide: Sky Captain's Handbook (2004), contributing writer
- Complete Guide to Vampires (2004), additional writing
- Dragonmech (2004), creator and writer
- The Shardsfall Quest (Dragonmech) (2004), author
- Dungeon Crawl Classics #3: The Mysterious Tower (d20 System)(2003), author
- Monsters of the Endless Dark (Wanderers Guild) (2003), additional writing
- Cretasus Adventure Guide (Dinosaur Planet: Broncosaurus Rex) (2002), author
- Metabarons #1 Path of the Warrior (Metabarons, The) (2002), West End Games, author
- Dinosaur Planet: Broncosaurus Rex Core Rulebook (2001), creator and writer
