= Dinosaur Planet: Broncosaurus Rex =

Tabletop role-playing game

Dinosaur Planet: Broncosaurus Rex is a role-playing game published by Goodman Games in 2001.

== Description ==
Broncosaurus Rex is a d20 System game.

== Publication history ==
Joseph Goodman started Goodman Games in 2001 and took advantage of the new d20 System license by publishing his first RPG, Broncosaurus Rex.

== Reviews ==
- Pyramid
