= Goodman Games =

Tabletop role-playing game publisher

- Type: Publisher
- Industry: RPG, Collectible card game & other assorted media.
- Founded: 2001
- Headquarters: Santa Clara, CA, USA
- Key people: Joseph Goodman: Owner, Michael Curtis: Director of Product Development for DCC, Chris Doyle: Director of Product Development for 5E, Jennifer Brinkman: Operations Manager, Aeryn "Blackdirge" Rudel: Staff Writer, Harley Stroh: Staff Writer, Doug Kovacs: Artist
- Products: Dungeon Crawl Classics, Mutant Crawl Classics, Original Adventures Reincarnated, Dragonmech, Etherscope & others
- Website: http://www.goodman-games.com/

Goodman Games is an American game publisher best known for the Dungeon Crawl Classics series of adventure modules and role-playing game, its science fiction offshoot Mutant Crawl Classics, and Original Adventures Reincarnated, a line of updated, annotated, and expanded republications of classic RPG adventures and supplements, mostly from TSR, Inc.'s Advanced Dungeons & Dragons. Additionally, Goodman Games produces RPGs using versions of the DCC rules for Fritz Leiber's Lankhmar and Jack Vance's Dying Earth settings, under license. The company has also produced licensed adventures for Wicked Fantasy Factory, Judges Guild, Xcrawl, Iron Heroes, Castles and Crusades, and Death Dealer.

== History ==
Joseph Goodman started Goodman Games in 2001 and took advantage of the new d20 System license by publishing his first RPG, Broncosaurus Rex. Goodman Games released a series of Complete Guides beginning with Complete Guide to Drow (2002), and another 10 books after that, several of which focused on unusual races that were not being covered by other publishers, such as Complete Guide to Doppelgangers (2002), Complete Guide to Rakshasas (2003), Complete Guide to Treants (2003), and Complete Guide to Wererats (2003). Despite success with Broncosaurus Rex and then moving to fantasy dungeon crawls, Goodman did not hire any in-house game designers and continued to work with freelance creators. With the Dungeon Crawl Classics label, Goodman intended to publish intelligent dungeon crawl adventures and to serve the growing demographic of older gamers. Goodman Games expanded into a wide range of fantasy and science fiction role playing game (RPG) supplements, mostly for the d20 license; which meant adventures compatible with the 3rd edition of Dungeons & Dragons ruleset.

Their card games include Geek Wars, World Championship Dodge Ball, and Scavenger Hunt.

In 2010, Goodman Games published Amethyst RPG, a science-fiction setting for 4th edition Dungeons and Dragons.

In 2018, Goodman Games released Mutant Crawl Classics, a post-apocalyptic role playing game compatible with the Dungeon Crawl Classics Role Playing Game ruleset.

In 2019, Goodman Games released Dungeon Crawl Classics: Lankhmar, a setting-specific game using DCC mechanics taking place in Fritz Leiber's fantasy world of Nehwon, home to his sword-and-sorcery duo of Fafhrd and the Gray Mouser.

Leaked documents from Wizard of the Coast in January 2023 suggested that Wizards planned to change the Open Game License (OGL), developed for its Dungeons & Dragons products, to be more restrictive and potentially harm third-party content creators. Goodman Games stated that "WotC's proposed changes to the OGL would have no impact on their lines". In response to the OGL leak, Paizo announced plans to develop a new license called the Open RPG Creative License (ORC) – this would be an open, perpetual, and irrevocable system-agnostic license stewarded by a nonprofit. This license will be open to publishers besides Paizo; Goodman Games joined the ORC License Alliance on January 13, 2023. Polygon reported that "in the weeks that Hasbro spent publicly flailing, customers spent an extraordinary amount of money investing in its competition". Goodman Games stated that January 2023 was "the best sales month in its two-decade history. Sales through the Goodman Games online store reached an all-time high, exceeding even prior Black Friday and holiday special events, while other channels saw similar growth. Dungeon Crawl Classics core rulebooks moved at a brisk pace throughout the month, as several accessories and adventure modules sold out, and the DCC core rulebook accelerated toward the end of its current print run".

In April 2023, Goodman Games released another game in the DCC family, this time based on the Dying Earth stories of Jack Vance. Dungeon Crawl Classics: Dying Earth uses core DCC mechanics with setting-specific additions to better capture the feel of Vance's stories, and was launched with a Boxed Set core game and nine all-new adventure modules set in Vance's world.

A forthcoming title in the DCC line of products is Xcrawl Classics—a new edition of Xcrawl using DCC mechanics. Xcrawl Classics offers arena-style dungeon crawling in an alternate reality setting in which adventurers are star athletes competing for fame and fortune in deadly engineered dungeons. XCC was the subject of a successful Kickstarter in August 2023.

== Games ==
=== Amethyst campaign setting ===

Amethyst is a campaign setting released for both the 3rd edition via the Open Gaming License and the D&D 4th edition via the Game System License. It is published by Dias Ex Machina, featuring the artwork of Nick Greenwood and Jaime Jones. Some of the rules are adapted to the setting to include elements such as vehicles and guns, making magic less powerful and additionally changes many of the "core" classes by opening up new paths of advancement via the class focus system. Additionally the game shares its combat rules with other future supplements of the same publisher and it is meant to be compatible with standard GSL rules. The setting makes fey playable. Amethyst was originally published under 3.5 rules and recognized with an Honorable Mention for Best Setting in the 2008 Gen Con ENnie Awards. Amethyst: Foundations by Chris Dias was previewed at the Free RPG Day of 2009, and then published in 2010 by Goodman Games as a science fantasy setting for 4th edition Dungeons & Dragons under the Game System License from Wizards of the Coast.

=== Dungeon Crawl Classics role playing game ===
In May 2012, Goodman Games released an original OGL-based role-playing game named after their earlier series of D&D-compatible adventures called Dungeon Crawl Classics Role Playing Game (DCC RPG). The design intention was "to create a modern RPG that reflects D&D’s origin-point concepts with decades-later rules editions."

=== Mutant Crawl Classics role playing game ===
Mutant Crawl Classics, inspired by the post-apocalyptic RPG Gamma World, was released in April 2018 after a successful Kickstarter campaign. A stand-alone game, it uses the Dungeon Crawl Classics rules engine and claims to be 100% compatible with DCC.

=== Other games ===
Goodman Games also published a series of licensed Call of Cthulhu adventures, beginning with Death in Luxor.

== Community activity ==
In July 2009, Goodman Games held a contest to award a Game Store with the award of "America's Favorite Game Store". The award went to Yottaquest.

Since 2007, Goodman Games has participated in the annual Free RPG Day, often creating new adventures and supplements in their popular DCC and MCC lines intended to be distributed for free to fans who visit their local Friendly Local Gaming Store on the day.

Goodman Games organizes and sponsors a DCC Day event once a year as a way of encouraging fans to visit their local game stores and play public games of DCC, MCC, and other Goodman Games. Beginning in 2020, DCC Day features exclusive products that are available at participating stores.

== Reception ==
Goodman Games won the 2006 Gold Ennie Award for "The Grognard Award".

Goodman Games won the 2013 Silver Ennie Award for "Fans’ Choice for Favorite Publisher".
