= The Chronicles of Ramlar =

- The Chronicles of Ramlar cover
- Designers: Tony Lee
- Publishers: White Silver Publishing, Inc.
- Publication: 2006
- Genres: Fantasy
- Systems: A/B (Armor/Body)
- Cover Art by Larry Elmore

The Chronicles of Ramlar is a fantasy role-playing game released by Whitesilver Publishing Inc. and created by John Anthony Prescott.

== History ==
The small press company White Silver Publishing reprinted the Sovereign Stone role-playing game core rules, after which they started working on The Chronicles of Ramlar which was published in 2006.

== Setting ==
The Ramlar referred to in the title is not the name of the world, but its creator, an omnipotent deity who rules over the many other gods and goddesses who rule various aspects of the world. The world itself is divided into two continents, default gameplay beginning on the continent of Eranon.

== System ==
Ramlar uses a combat system called "The A/B System" (short for Armor/Body). Character sheets prominently display a body diagram. The body diagram is essentially a hit location chart with each body part having its own life points and armor to protect that part. Ramlar also makes use of a combat mechanic called momentum, which allows players to turn previous success into an opportunity for potentially larger successes. The game uses percentile dice.
