= Starfinder Roleplaying Game =

Tabletop role-playing game

Starfinder
- Second edition Player Core cover, illustrated by Kent Hamilton
- Publishers: Paizo Publishing
- Publication: August 2017
- Years active: 2017 – present
- Genres: Role-playing game
- Systems: d20 system
- Chance: Dice rolling
- Website: paizo.com/starfinder

The Starfinder Roleplaying Game is a science-fiction/science fantasy role-playing game published by Paizo Publishing. It is built on Paizo's previous game, the Pathfinder Roleplaying Game, both in its game mechanics and universe, but adapted to a more futuristic style than its fantasy predecessor; game content is intended to be easily convertible between the two systems. Like its predecessor, the Starfinder RPG supports adventure paths and other material written by Paizo and third party publishers.

== Background ==
Starfinder draws inspiration from many other science-fiction and space opera franchises, including Star Wars, Alien, Guardians of the Galaxy, and Warhammer 40,000. Paizo first released a science-fiction product in 2012, with the Distant Worlds supplement to Pathfinder. After the success of Distant Worlds, Paizo decided to create the new system, using it as a base.

The Starfinder RPG was announced in May 2016 on Paizo's website and officially released at Gen Con in August 2017.

A second edition of Starfinder launched in the summer of 2025. Starfinder 2e is fully compatible with Pathfinder 2e, which allows a GM to introduce fantasy elements into the Starfinder setting or vice versa. The new rules also moved Starfinder away from the controversial Open Game License used by Wizards of the Coast to a less restricted Open RPG Creative License developed by Paizo.

== Design ==
Starfinder is based on the first edition of Paizo's previous game, Pathfinder, and like its predecessor uses the d20 system created by Wizards of the Coast for Dungeons & Dragons. Starfinder shares its setting with Pathfinder, set in its far future after Golarion, the planet that Pathfinder was set on, had mysteriously disappeared in an event called "The Gap". The history of the planet during the disappearance is lost to all races, preventing players from returning and interfering with previous events in the Pathfinder timeline, while also acting as the foundation of Starfinder's own timeline. Because Starfinder shares its past with Pathfinder, races and monsters of the Pathfinder setting persist in the Starfinder universe alongside new alien races from other worlds. Magic remains a part of the game's mechanics, often intertwined with high-level technology. In the time since the Gap, allied races formed an alliance called the Pact Worlds for diplomacy, trade, and technological sharing, with Absalom Station as their focal point for these activities. An organization called the Starfinder Society, based on Absalom Station and other planets, was established to seek out pre-Gap technology and any information that may have explained what happened prior to that event.

Similar to Pathfinder, the game features personal combat using weapons and magic, though these systems have been simplified and adjusted to the futuristic setting. In addition, Starfinder also has rules regarding starships, space combat, and faster-than-light travel. Starfinder retains the traditional fantasy races as choices for players (for example, elves, dwarves, and orcs), but offers a different set of races as the standard, including the reptilian vesk and rat-like ysoki, while also offering several non-traditional choices such as a "seven-armed starfish". Starfinder also introduces a new array of seven character classes for players to choose from, which can be further customized, and body augmentations which can give different abilities. Starfinder is designed so that content from Pathfinder can be easily converted to Starfinder and vice versa; the game has guidelines on converting characters and monsters between the two systems.

With the changes to Pathfinder in its second edition in 2019, Paizo began working on a similar update to Starfinder. The goal with these updates were to make Starfinder fully compatible with Pathfinder 2nd Edition, so that a player familiar with one system could easily adapt to the other system, as well as to open the opportunity for game masters to mix content between the two settings. Paizo also did not want to break their lore, keeping core rules from previous 1st Edition supplementary books while expanding on lore such as the Drift Crisis. Play test rules for Starfinder 2nd Edition were released in 2024 to get player feedback, and the first 2nd Edition materials were released during Gen Con 2025.

== Reception ==
Early reviews praised Starfinder for its streamlined rules and expansive, flexible setting. The new starship combat rules also received praise, though some criticism was pointed at its repetitiveness and lack of options.

Starfinder won the 2018 Origins Award for Fan Favorite Role-Playing Game.

Supplementary content for the game continued to receive a warm reception, including Ports of Call, and Drift Hackers.

In a review of Starfinder in Black Gate, Andrew Zimmerman Jones said "What Starfinder has going for it, I think, is that the setting allows for a lot of different types of gameplay at the same time. If you wanted to play a galactic rebellion space fantasy, the system allows for it. A gritty cyberpunk game of corporate espionage? That's there, too. A planetary romance adventure? A derelict ship full of space zombies? A ragtag crew of outlaw heroes, a la Firefly or Guardians of the Galaxy? A post-apocalyptic dystopia? Explore new worlds and new civilizations? Yup, those are all covered."

Alex Meehan for Dicebreaker named Starfinder one of the best tabletop role-playing games to play in 2024.

== Supplementary material and related products ==
Paizo and audio app developer Syrinscape partnered to create an official set of sound effects for Starfinder, and Paizo licensed design studio Ninja Division to create plastic miniatures. These were released alongside the general launch of the game in August 2017.

Paizo along with Audible created a Starfinder Alexa skill adventure pilot episode "Scoundrels in the Spike" released in December 2019. The pilot was considered successful, leading Amazon to have Paizo and Audible create a full six-episode adventure based on the "Dead Suns" campaign, which was first released in August 2020. The adventure, including the pilot, includes voice acting from Nathan Fillion and Laura Bailey along with eleven others. According to Bailey, the voice acting for the newer episodes were done from home studios due to the COVID-19 pandemic though working together online when characters interacted with each other. Within the skill, the user is able to select one of five main characters, and then make certain decisions that can affect the outcome of the story, as well as initiate the game's skill checks and determine how combat progresses; the rules have been simplified from the tabletop version to adapt to voice commands. The skill's pilot episode and first episode of the new campaign were available for free with the remaining episodes available to purchase. In 2021, Paizo announced the Drift Crisis storyline as part of their Drift Crashers supplement, where the setting's hyperdimensional travel system breaks down.

Paizo released an enhanced edition of Starfinder in late 2023, featuring streamlined star ship combat. Paizo has also announced a second edition of Starfinder for late in 2024, following many of the conventions seen in the second edition of Pathfinder.

A single player video game, Starfinder: Afterlight, is being developed by Epictellers Entertainment in partnership with Paizo, with planned release in early access in 2026 for Windows computers. The game will use the 2nd edition rules, with the player's own created character and six recruitable pre-defined characters to add to their party. Voice cast for these predefined characters include Neil Newbon, Inel Tomlinson, Fred Tatasciore, Melissa Medína, and James Alexander.

A stand-alone module based on Digital Extremes' Warframe video game, developed by Paizo and Digital Extremes, was released in October 2025.

== See also ==
- Pathfinder Roleplaying Game
- List of Starfinder books
