= Xcrawl =

Xcrawl is a 2002 role-playing game published by Pandahead Publishing.

== Gameplay ==
The player characters in Xcrawl are "Xtreme Sports Athletes", who compete in deadly, televised dungeon crawls for fame and fortune, detailed with setting lore, campaign rules, and new classes, skills, feats, weapons, and monsters.

== Publication history ==
Shannon Appelcline noted that Goodman Games "was working with several other publishers, this time to produce licensed adventures for their RPGs or settings" including "a complete line for Pandahead Publishing's modern-day dungeon crawl game, Xcrawl (2006-2008)." Appelcline also noted that Goodman Games contributed Xcrawl: Dungeonbattle Brooklyn (2007) "intended as an introduction to Pandahead's quirky setting" to Free RPG Day in 2007.

== Reviews ==
- Pyramid
- Backstab
- Knights of the Dinner Table Magazine #75 (Jan., 2003)
- NAG
