= Roger Huntman =

American author

- Writing career
- Period: 1991–present
- Subjects: Sci-fi, horror, RPG, educational material
- Notable works: Ancient Horror; Teaching with Roleplay

Roger James Huntman is an American author of horror, supernatural fiction, suspense, educational, science-fiction, and fantasy novels. Copies have been adapted into tabletop games and audiobooks. He has also written approximately 100 tabletop game articles and short stories, most of which have been published in electronic formats.

== Career ==
His debut, Vampire Hotel, was published in 2014, and was followed by Ancient Steel Horror the roleplaying game, Zombie Convention, Vampire Hunt and Vampire Hunter 101. Werewolf Therapy, and a collection of collaborations with Greg Stomberg and Logan Montgomery Knight. Teaching with Roleplay was one of his first major departures from the horror genre and one of the first publications to use roleplay in the classroom.

His first attempts in publishing were in 1991 after a gamer in his group, Dave Arneson, co-creator of Dungeons & Dragons, attended his regular roleplaying game sessions, and then giving his blessing on the original game Ancient Steel Role Playing Game. This gave way to a small print run of the game in 1992. He has more than 40 publications as of 2024.

== Theater and film ==
Huntman has performed with Shakespeare Coeur d'Alene, a Coeur d'Alene theater company founded in 2023. In 2025 he appeared as Seacoal in its production of Much Ado About Nothing and as Marcellus and Lucianus in its Hamlet. In 2026, he appeared in the company's Western-themed The Tamin' of the Shrew and, in October, was both the Duke of Exeter and the choreographer for its production of Henry V.

== Politics ==
While working as a middle school teacher at Developing Mind Montessori School in Post Falls, Idaho, Huntman was unhappy with recent decisions by the city council of Coeur d'Alene, Idaho, so in 2019 he ran for one of the three seats on the city countil. Hutman was running for seat 5 on the council. He ran against incumbent Dan English. Hutman dropped out of the race soon after due to a lack of financial resources. He dropped out after the deadline to remove his name from the ballot. Huntman still received 5.2% of the vote.

== Education ==
Roger Huntman served as a treasurer in high school. Huntman has an associates degree in psychology from Western Iowa Tech, a bachelors degree in theology from Briar Cliff University, and a masters degree in Education from Grand Canyon University.
