= List of Warhammer Fantasy Roleplay publications =

This bibliography of Warhammer Fantasy Roleplay publications is a list of all officially published products containing rules and background relating to the various editions of Warhammer Fantasy Roleplay.

== First edition ==
All publications released during the lifetime of the game's first edition came in softback format, unless stated otherwise below.

=== Published by Games Workshop ===
- GW2051 Warhammer Fantasy Roleplay (main rulebook, hardback, 1986, ISBN 1-869893-02-6)
- GW0021 The Enemy Within (campaign supplement, 1986, ISBN 1-869893-04-2)
- Dungeon Rooms and Dungeon Lairs (boxed floorplan sets, 1986)
- Character Pack (1st edition, expanded rules for character generation, 1987, ISBN 1-869893-34-4)
- GW0022 Shadows Over Bögenhafen (second part of The Enemy Within Campaign, 1987, ISBN 1-869893-07-7)
- GW0023 Death on the Reik (boxed edition, third part of The Enemy Within campaign, 1987, ISBN 1-869893-10-7)
- GW0025 Warhammer City (Middenheim sourcebook, 1987, ISBN 1-869893-24-7)
- GW0024 Power Behind the Throne (fourth part of The Enemy Within campaign, 1988, ISBN 1-869893-43-3)
- GW0029 Death on the Reik (republished as a hardback, 1988)
- GW0027 Warhammer Campaign (hardback collection of The Enemy Within and Shadows over Bögenhafen, 1988)
- GW0028 Something Rotten in Kislev (fifth part of The Enemy Within campaign, 1988, ISBN 1-869893-56-5)
- GW0111 Realm of Chaos: Slaves to Darkness (first of the two Realm of Chaos volumes, joint WFRP/WFB/WH40K hardback supplement, 1988, ISBN 1-869893-51-4)
- GW0026 The Restless Dead (collection of scenarios previous published in White Dwarf magazine, 1989, ISBN 1-869893-73-5)
- GW0036 Warhammer Adventure (collection of the first three parts of The Enemy Within campaign, 1989, ISBN 1-872372-22-8)
- GW0039 Warhammer City of Chaos (collection of Warhammer City and Power Behind the Throne, 1989, ISBN 1-872372-41-4)
- GW0030 Empire in Flames (sixth part of the Enemy Within Campaign, 1989, ISBN 1-872372-08-2)
- GW0020 Warhammer Fantasy Roleplay (main rulebook republished as a softback with minor corrections, 1989)
- GW0112 Realm of Chaos: The Lost and the Damned (2nd volume of the joint WFRP/WFB/WH40K supplement, hardback, 1990, ISBN 1-869893-52-2)

=== Published by Flame Publications ===
- FP0016 The Doomstones Campaign part 1: Fire in the Mountains (1990, ISBN 1-872372-14-7)
- FP0003 Lichemaster (a redesigned scenario pack from the second edition of Warhammer Fantasy Battle, 1990, ISBN 1-872372-01-5)
- FP0017 The Doomstones Campaign part 2: Blood in Darkness (1990, ISBN 1-872372-23-6)
- FP0031 Character Pack (1st edition – 1st edition of the character pack, not the game as a whole, 1990)
- FP0035 Warhammer Companion: A Grimoire of arcane knowledge (collection of scenarios and additional rules, 1990)
- FP0018 The Doomstones Campaign part 3: Death Rock (1990, ISBN 1-872372-24-4)
- FP0019 The Doomstones Campaign part 4: Dwarf Wars (this did not have the Doomstones name, but it is the fourth title in the series, 1990)
- FP0037 Death's Dark Shadow (scenario pack, 1991)
- FP0036 Castle Drachenfels (scenario pack based on Jack Yeovil's novel Drachenfels, 1992)
- FP0032 Character Pack (2nd edition – 2nd printing – 2nd edition of the character pack, not the game as a whole, 1992)

=== Published by Hogshead Publishing ===
- HP200 Warhammer Fantasy Roleplay (softcover reprint, 1995, ISBN 1-899749-01-2)
- HP201 The Enemy Within Campaign volume 1: Shadows over Bögenhafen (reprint of Warhammer Campaign, 1995, ISBN 1-899749-02-0)
- HP202 Apocrypha Now (additional rules, 1995, ISBN 1-899749-03-9)
- HP203 The Dying of the Light (scenario pack, 1995, ISBN 1-899749-04-7)
- HP206 The Doomstones Campaign volume 1: Fire and Blood (collection of Fire in the Mountains and Blood in Darkness, 1996, ISBN 1-899749-09-8)
- HP205 The Enemy Within Campaign volume 2: Death on the Reik (reprint, 1996, ISBN 1-899749-07-1)
- HP204 GM's Screen & Reference Pack (1997, ISBN 1-899749-08-X)
- HP209 The Doomstones Campaign volume 2: Wars & Death (collection of Death Rock and Dwarf Wars, with three new pages, 1997, ISBN 1-899749-10-1)
- HP212 Middenheim: City of Chaos (reprint of Warhammer City, 1998, ISBN 1-899749-12-8)
- HP211 The Enemy Within Campaign volume 3: Power Behind the Throne (reprint with a new 14-page prologue, 1998, ISBN 1-899749-11-X)
- HP213 The Enemy Within Campaign volume 4: Something Rotten in Kislev (reprint, 1999, ISBN 1-899749-19-5)
- HP208 Marienburg: Sold Down the River (Marienburg sourcebook, 1999, ISBN 1-899749-14-4)
- HP214 Apocrypha 2: Chart of Darkness (additional rules, 2000, ISBN 1-899749-17-9)
- HP217 Death's Dark Shadow (reprint, 2001, ISBN 1-899749-27-6)
- HP215 The Doomstones Campaign volume 3: Heart of Chaos (a new fifth part for the Doomstones campaign, 2001, ISBN 1-899749-16-0)
- HOG207 Realms of Sorcery (magic sourcebook, 2001, softcover [HOG207S, ISBN 1-899749-13-6] and hardcover [HOG207H, ISBN 1-899749-33-0])
- HOG220 Corrupting Influence: The Best of Warpstone, Volume 1 (compilation of articles from Warpstone magazine, ISBN 1-899749-34-9)
- HOG218 Dwarfs: Stone and Steel (Dwarf sourcebook, 2002, ISBN 1-899749-28-4)

== Second edition ==
=== Published by Black Industries ===
All publications for WFRP 2nd edition printed by Black Industries are in hardback format unless stated otherwise.

==== 2005 ====
- Warhammer Fantasy Roleplay: A Grim World of Perilous Adventure (core rulebook, including a short adventure – March 2005, ISBN 1-84416-220-6)
- Character Pack (50-sheet pad and black and white booklet in a colour wrap, March 2005, ISBN 1-84416-221-4)
- Plundered Vaults (three classic scenarios updated from the previous edition and three new scenarios – March 2005, ISBN 1-84416-264-8)
- Game Master's Pack (four-pane A4 colour screen and black and white booklet, April 2005, ISBN 1-84416-222-2)
- Old World Bestiary: A Compendium of Creatures Fair and Foul (monster and NPC sourcebook – April 2005, ISBN 1-84416-226-5)
- Ashes of Middenheim: Paths of the Damned Campaign volume 1 (first volume of the Paths of the Damned campaign – May 2005, ISBN 1-84416-223-0)
- Warhammer Fantasy Roleplay Collectors Edition (leather-bound hardback version of the Second Edition rulebook, June 2005, ISBN 1-84416-302-4)
- Old World Armoury: Militaria & Miscellania (equipment sourcebook – July 2005, ISBN 1-84416-266-4)
- Sigmar's Heirs: A Guide to the Empire (Empire sourcebook – August 2005, ISBN 1-84416-265-6)
- Spires of Altdorf: Paths of the Damned Campaign volume 2 (second volume of the Paths of the Damned campaign – September 2005, ISBN 1-84416-224-9)
- Karak Azgal: Adventures of the Dragon Crag (adventure pack and dungeon sourcebook – October 2005, ISBN 1-84416-267-2)
- Realms of Sorcery (magic sourcebook, including a short adventure – November 2005, ISBN 1-84416-268-0)

==== 2006 ====
- Forges of Nuln: Paths of the Damned Campaign volume 3 (third and final volume of the Paths of the Damned campaign – February 2006, ISBN 1-84416-225-7)
- Knights of the Grail: A Guide to Bretonnia (Bretonnia sourcebook – March 2006, ISBN 1-84416-305-9)
- Barony of the Damned: An Adventure in Mousillon (adventure pack and Mousillon sourcebook – April 2006, ISBN 1-84416-306-7)
- Children of the Horned Rat: A Guide to Skaven (Skaven sourcebook – June 2006, ISBN 1-84416-307-5)
- Terror in Talabheim: An Adventure in the Eye of the Forest (adventure pack and Talabheim sourcebook – July 2006, ISBN 1-84416-308-3)
- Tome of Corruption: Secrets from the Realm of Chaos (Chaos sourcebook – October 2006, ISBN 1-84416-309-1)
- The WFRP Companion: A Warhammer Fantasy Roleplay Miscellany (collection of additional resources and rules – softback, November 2006, ISBN 1-84416-310-5)
- Character Folio (adventuring journal for recording PCs' exploits – booklet form, November 2006, ISBN 1-84416-467-5)
- Game Master's Toolkit (GM's screen – screen and booklet form, November 2006, ISBN 1-84416-445-4)
- Renegade Crowns: Adventures Among the Border Princes (Border Princes sourcebook – December 2006, ISBN 1-84416-311-3)

==== 2007 ====
- Lure of the Liche Lord: An Adventure in the Border Princes (adventure pack – softback, February 2007, ISBN 1-84416-312-1)
- Night's Dark Masters: A Guide to Vampires (Vampire sourcebook – softback, April 2007, ISBN 1-84416-313-X)
- Tome of Salvation: Priests of the Old World (religion or 'divine' sourcebook – September 2007, ISBN 1-84416-314-8, reprinted as softback)
- Realm of the Ice Queen: A Guide to Kislev (Kislev sourcebook – softback, November 2007, ISBN 1-84416-433-0)

=== Published by Fantasy Flight Games ===
==== 2008 ====
- The Thousand Thrones: An Epic Campaign of Lurking Horror and Intrigue (adventure – softback, April 2008, ISBN 1-84416-434-9). (Note: This book was originally supposed to be published by Black Industries. The publishing rights were transferred to Fantasy Flight Games along with the license to produce Warhammer Fantasy Roleplay material. As such, the book doesn't contain any reference to Fantasy Flight Games. "Fantasy Flight Games to Exclusively Publish Board Games, Card Games, and Roleplaying Games based on Games Workshop properties" (PDF). Games Workshop. 22 February 2008.)

==== 2009 ====
- WH26 Shades of Empire: Organisations of the Old World (sourcebook detailing nine organisations within The Empire – softback, January 2009, ISBN 978-1-58994-465-7)
- WH27 Career Compendium: The Ultimate Career Reference (collects all the non-monstrous careers published in previous Warhammer Fantasy Roleplay supplements so far – softback, February 2009, ISBN 978-1-58994-480-0)

== Third edition ==
=== Published by Fantasy Flight Games ===
==== 2009 ====
- A Day Late, A Shilling Short (PDF download, 23 November 2009, no ISBN)
- WHF01 Warhammer Fantasy Roleplay Core Set (boxed set, 25 November 2009, ISBN 978-1-58994-696-5)
- WHF02 The Adventurer's Toolkit (boxed set, 14 December 2009, ISBN 978-1-58994-695-8)

==== 2010 ====
- WHF03 Dice Accessory Pack (blister pack of 12 custom dice, 1 February 2010, ISBN 978-1-58994-697-2)
- WHF05 Game Master's Toolkit (boxed set, 25 March 2010, ISBN 978-1-58994-699-6)
- WHF04 The Gathering Storm (boxed set, 22 April 2010, ISBN 978-1-58994-698-9)
- WHF00 WFRP Toolkit iPhone Application (iPhone app, 20 May 2010, no ISBN)
- WHF06 The Winds of Magic (boxed set, 29 June 2010, ISBN 978-1-58994-701-6)
- Journey to Black Fire Pass (PDF download, 13 August 2010, no ISBN)
- WHF07 The Edge of Night (boxed set, 25 August 2010, ISBN 978-1-58994-702-3)
- WHF08 Signs of Faith (boxed set, 22 October 2010, ISBN 978-1-58994-703-0)
- WHF11 The Player's Guide (hardcover book, 20 December 2010, ISBN 978-1-58994-740-5)
- WHF12 Player's Vault (boxed set, 20 December 2010, ISBN 978-1-58994-741-2)
- WHF13 The Game Master's Guide (hardcover book, 20 December 2010, ISBN 978-1-58994-724-5)
- WHF14 Game Master's Vault (boxed set, 20 December 2010, ISBN 978-1-58994-725-2)
- WHF09 The Creature Guide (hardcover book, 31 December 2010, ISBN 978-1-58994-704-7)
- WHF10 Creature Vault (boxed set, 31 December 2010, ISBN 978-1-58994-739-9)

==== 2011 ====
- WHF15 The Witch's Song (boxed set, 28 January 2011, ISBN 978-1-58994-718-4)
- WHF16 Omens of War (boxed set, 27 April 2011, ISBN 978-1-58994-818-1)
- WHF17 Black Fire Pass (boxed set, 27 July 2011, ISBN 978-1-58994-815-0)
- WHF18 Lure of Power (boxed set, 10 November 2011, ISBN 978-1-58994-813-6)

==== 2012 ====
- WHF22 Faith of Sigmar (print-on-demand card set, 19 January 2012, ISBN 978-1-61661-395-2)
- WHF21 Dreadfleet Captains (print-on-demand card set, 7 March 2012, ISBN 978-1-61661-369-3)
- WHF23 Bright Order Magic (print-on-demand card set, 17 April 2012, ISBN 978-1-61661-430-0)
- WHF19 Hero's Call (boxed set, 18 April 2012, ISBN 978-1-61661-334-1)
- WHF24 Faith of Shallya (print-on-demand card set, 14 May 2012, ISBN 978-1-61661-449-2)
- WHF25 Celestial Order Magic (print-on-demand card set, 24 October 2012, ISBN 978-1-61661-454-6)
- WHF20 The Enemy Within (boxed set, 13 December 2012, ISBN 978-1-61661-476-8)

==== 2013 ====
- WHF26 From the Grave (print-on-demand career pack, 24 January 2013, ISBN 978-1-61661-459-1)
- WHF27 Faith of Morr (print-on-demand card set, 29 March 2013, ISBN 978-1-61661-457-7)
- WHF28 Grey Order Magic (print-on-demand card set, 22 May 2013, ISBN 978-1-61661-706-6)

== Fourth edition ==
=== Published by Cubicle 7 ===
==== 2018 ====
- Warhammer Fantasy Roleplay: A Grim World of Perilous Adventure (core rulebook – August 2018, ISBN 978-0-85744-335-9)
- Ubersreik Adventures: If Looks Could Kill (PDF Download, November 2018, No ISBN)
- Old World Adventures: Night of Blood (PDF Download, November 2018, No ISBN)
- Adventure Afoot in the Reikland (PDF Download, December 2018, No ISBN)
- Warhammer Fantasy Roleplay: Starter set (starter set, including an introductory scenario – December 2018, ISBN 978-0-85744-336-6)

==== 2019 ====
- Rough Nights & Hard Days (adventure pack, including both new and classic scenarios – April 2019, ISBN 978-0-85744-338-0)
- Buildings of the Reikland (PDF Download, May 2019, No ISBN)
- Ubersreik Adventures: The Mad Men of Gotheim (PDF Download, July 2019, No ISBN)
- Ubersreik Adventures: Bait and Witch (PDF Download, September 2019, No ISBN)
- Ubersreik Adventures: Heart of Glass (PDF Download, October 2019, No ISBN)
- Enemy in Shadows (Part 1 of the Enemy Within Campaign, contains new adaptations of The Enemy Within and Shadows Over Bogenhafen adventures from the first edition – October 2019, ISBN 978-0-85744-345-8)
- Ubersreik Adventures: Slaughter in Spittlefeld (PDF Download, October 2019, No ISBN)
- Enemy in Shadows Companion (Companion volume to Enemy in Shadows – November 2019, ISBN 978-0-85744-346-5)
- Gamemaster's Screen and Gamemaster's Guide (December 2019, ISBN 978-0-85744-343-4)
- Ubersreik Adventures (Collection of the six "Ubersreik Adventures" titles, December 2019, No ISBN)
- Ubersreik Adventures: The Guilty Party (PDF Download, December 2019, No ISBN)

==== 2020 ====
- Ubersreik Adventures II: Deadly Dispatch (PDF Download, May 2020, No ISBN)
- Monuments of the Reikland (PDF Download, June 2020, No ISBN)
- Death on the Reik (Part 2 of the Enemy Within Campaign, July 2020, ISBN 978-0-85744-353-3)
- Ubersreik Adventures II: Double Trouble (PDF Download, July 2020, No ISBN)
- It's Your Funeral (PDF Download, August 2020, No ISBN)
- Death on the Reik Companion (Companion Volume to Death on the Reik, September 2020, ISBN 978-0-85744-354-0)
- Ubersreik Adventures II: Fishrook Returns (PDF Download, October 2020, No ISBN)
- Old World Adventures: Hell Rides to Hallt (PDF Download, October 2020, No ISBN)
- Middenheim: City of the White Wolf (Middenheim Sourcebook, November 2020, ISBN 978-0-85744-359-5)
- One Shots of the Reikland (PDF Download, November 2020, No ISBN)
- Archives of the Empire Volume 1 (Sourcebook for non-humans, December 2020, ISBN 978-0-85744-370-0)
- Old World Adventures: The Spirit of Mondstille (PDF Download, December 2020, [ISBN unspecified])
- Power Behind the Throne (Part 3 of the Enemy Within Campaign, December 2020, ISBN 978-0-85744-356-4)

==== 2021 ====
- Shrines of Sigmar (PDF Download, January 2021, No ISBN)
- Ubersreik Adventures II: The Blessing that Drew Blood (PDF Download, January 2021, No ISBN)
- Power Behind the Throne Companion (Companion volume to Power Behind the Throne – February 2021, ISBN 978-0-85744-357-1)
- Patrons of the Old World (PDF Download, March 2021, No ISBN)
- Altdorf: Crown of the Empire (PDF Download initially, February 2022, No ISBN)
- Ubersreik Adventures II: Grey Mountain Gold (PDF Download, March 2021, No ISBN)
- Old World Adventures: Something Knocking (PDF Download April 2021)
- The Horned Rat (Part 4 of the Enemy Within Campaign, May 2021, PDF Download initially, No ISBN yet)
- The Cluster-Eye Tribe (PDF Download, June 2021, No ISBN)
- The Horned Rat Companion (Companion volume to The Horned Rat - May 2021, PDF Download initially, No ISBN)
- Elector Counts (Standalone card game, July 2021, No ISBN)
- The Empire in Ruins (Part 5 of the Enemy Within Campaign, September 2021, PDF Download initially, No ISBN)
- Old World Adventures: Feast of Blood (PDF Download, October 2021, No ISBN)
- Ubersreik Adventures: No Strings Attached (PDF Download, November 2021, No ISBN)
- Archives of the Empire II (PDF Download, November 2021, No ISBN)
- The Empire in Ruins Companion (Companion volume to The Empire in Ruins - December 2021, PDF Download initially, No ISBN)
- Blood and Bramble (PDF Download, December 2021, No ISBN)
- Hirelings of the Old World (PDF Download, December 2021, No ISBN)

==== 2022 ====
- Ubersreik Adventures II (Collection of the five "Ubersreik Adventures II" titles, PDF Download initially, February 2022, ISBN 978-085744-388-5)
- The Imperial Zoo (PDF Download initially, February 2022, ISBN 978-0-85744-405-9)
- Up in Arms (PDF Download initially, March 2022, ISBN 978-0-85744-409-7)
- Old World Adventures: The Emperor's Wrath (PDF Download, April 2022)
- The Night Parade (PDF Download, May 2022)
- Winds of Magic (PDF Download initially, May 2022, ISBN 978-0-85744-413-4)
- Salzenmund: City of Salt and Silver (PDF Download initially, June 2022, ISBN 978-1-913569-64-8)
- Old World Adventures: Between Skarok and a Hard Place (PDF Download, June 2022)
- Sea of Claws (PDF Download initially, August 2022, ISBN 978-1-913569-56-3)
- The Warband of Bayl of Many Eyes (PDF Download, October 2022)
- Old World Adventures: Skeleton Crew (PDF Download, October 2022)
- Archives of the Empire III (PDF Download, December 2022, ISBN 978-1-913569-63-1)

==== 2023 ====
- Lustria (PDF Download initially, March 2023, ISBN 978-1-913569-59-4)
- Ubersreik Adventures III (PDF Download initially, March 2023, ISBN 978-1-913569-85-3)
- Old World Adventures: Forest of Hate (PDF Download, July 2023)
- Taverns of the Old World (PDF Download, November 2023)
- Reikland Miscellanea (November 2023, ISBN 978-1-78789-011-4)

==== 2024 ====
- Tribes and Tribulations (PDF Download initially, January 2024, ISBN 9781913569976, March 2024)
- The Hahnbrandt Militia (PDF Download, April 2024)
- The Corsairs of Captain Flariel (PDF Download, June 2024)
- Dwarf Player's Guide (PDF Download initially, October 2024, ISBN 978-1-913569-98-3)
- Deft Steps Light Fingers (PDF Download initially, December 2024, ISBN 978-1-913569-86-0)

==== 2025 ====
- High Elf Player's Guide (PDF Download initially, February 2025, ISBN 978-1-78789-024-4)
- Lords of Stone and Steel (PDF Download initially, April 2025, ISBN 978-1-78789-031-2)
- Sea Wardens of Cothique (PDF Download initially, July 2025, ISBN 978-1-913569-87-7)

==== 2026 ====
- Temple of Spite (PDF Download initially, February 2026, ISBN unknown)

== Contributing authors (all editions) ==
- Dave Allen
- Gary Astleford
- Owen Barnes
- Mike Brunton
- Eric Cagle
- David Chart
- Paul Cockburn
- Ben Counter
- Steve Darlington (AKA "Steve Dee")
- Zak Dale-Clutterbuck
- Graeme Davis
- Claus Thorn Ekström
- Kate Flack
- Chris Handley
- Jude Hornborg
- Andrew Kendrick
- Andy Law (AKA Andrew Law)
- Lindsay Law
- Robin D. Laws
- Andrew Leask
- Steven Lewis
- Jay Little
- T. S. Luikart
- Mac Dara Mac Donnacha
- Jody Macgregor
- Sean Masterson
- Dominic McDowall
- Graham McNeill
- Pádraig Murphy
- Derrick Norton
- Alfred Nuñez
- Ciarán O'Brien
- Clive Oldfield
- Lewis Page
- Chris Pramas
- Rick Priestley
- Síne Quinn
- Anthony Ragan
- Ken Rolston
- Aaron S. Rosenberg
- Carl Sargent
- Robert J. Schwalb
- Ben Scerri (AKA Bee Scerri)
- William Simoni
- Marijan von Staufer
- Ian Sturrock
- Gav Thorpe
- Jeff Tidball
- Chris Walz
- Philip Wells
- David Whitworth
- Simon Wileman
