= Fire and Blood: Volume One of the Doomstones Campaign =

Fire and Blood: Volume One of the Doomstones Campaign is a 1996 role-playing game adventure published by Hogshead Publishing for Warhammer Fantasy Roleplay.

== Plot summary ==
Fire and Blood: Volume One of the Doomstones Campaign is an adventure in which a combat-heavy dungeon crawl is set in the Vaults mountain range. This volume follows a party's search for four ancient dwarven Crystals of Power.

== Publication history ==
Fire and Blood: Volume One of the Doomstones Campaign compiles the first two chapters of the four-part saga—Fire in the Mountains and Blood in Darkness.

== Reception ==
Jim Flynn reviewed Fire and Blood: Volume One of the Doomstones Campaign for Arcane magazine, rating it a 6 out of 10 overall, and stated that "Fire and Blood is a worthwhile book. The volume is huge, it's well presented and written, and there are enough puzzles to keep beginner adventurers going. It's hard not to recommend it fully, if only to persuade other authors to get working on WFRP campaigns. The fact is, though, that as a standalone adventure it ignores WFRP's strengths and stomps into brash insignificance compared with The Enemy Within's finest moments."

== Reviews ==
- Valkyrie #13 (1997)
- Warpstone (Issue 3 - Autumn 1996)
