= Science Fiction Awards Database =

Online index of science fiction awards

- Website type: Online database
- Owners: Mark R. Kelly and the Locus Science Fiction Foundation
- Website: www.sfadb.com
- Commercial: No
- Launched: 2000 (as the Locus Index to Science Fiction Awards)
- Current status: Compiles data from over 100 science fiction, fantasy, and horror awards, from 1951 to date.

The Science Fiction Awards Database (SFADB) is an index of science fiction, fantasy, and horror awards compiled by Mark R. Kelly and published by the Locus Science Fiction Foundation. Known formerly as the Locus Index to SF Awards, it has been cited as an invaluable science fiction resource, and is often more up-to-date than the awards' own websites (according to The Encyclopedia of Science Fiction).

== History ==
The Locus Index to Science Fiction Awards was established in 2000 by Mark R. Kelly, the founder of Locus Online. The Cornell University Library has described it as a comprehensive listing of science fiction awards, including "reader polls, fan awards, inactive awards, academic awards, award statistics, and more". Despite the title, the index has always covered fantasy and horror in addition to science fiction. In 2012, coincident with Kelly's retirement as an aerospace software engineer, the website received a redesign and expansion, and was renamed the Science Fiction Awards Database (SFADB).

== Reception ==
The index has received praise from authors and editors of speculative fiction, including Jo Walton and Gardner Dozois. Walton has said that her book An Informal History of the Hugos would not have been possible without the existence of the index. The Orion Publishing Group called it "extraordinary, and to our mind, criminally under-appreciated", and cited it as a primary source for Gollancz's SF Masterworks and SF Gateway series of books.

Ever wondered who won the Hugo Award in 1963? (Philip K. Dick's The Man in the High Castle) Or how many Nebula Awards Connie Willis has won? (Seven) Or whether Ursula K. Le Guin ever won the Theodore Sturgeon Memorial Award? (Yes, in 1995 with novella Forgiveness Day) Then you need to visit the Locus Index to Science Fiction Awards. We do. Every week. – Orion.

Writing in The Encyclopedia of Science Fiction, Peter Nicholls and David Langford called the index invaluable, and noted that it was often more up-to-date than the awards' official websites. Locus Online, which hosted the index, received the 2002 Hugo Award for Best Website.

== Contents ==
The SFADB compiles over 100 literary awards for science fiction, fantasy, and horror, from 1951 to date. It includes both nominees and winners, with a separate page for each person and award. Awards are displayed as three groups: Major Career Awards, Major Awards and Other Awards, and can be sorted chronologically, by nominee, and by category.

Statistics such as "Total Wins", "Total Losses" and "Never-Winners" are also listed. The following table lists a subset of 29 awards that are featured in the "Awards" dropdown (as of 2021):

| Group | Award |
|---|---|
| Major Career Awards | Science Fiction and Fantasy Hall of Fame |
| Major Career Awards | SFWA Grand Master Award |
| Major Awards | Hugo Awards |
| Major Awards | Nebula Awards |
| Major Awards | World Fantasy Awards |
| Major Awards | Andre Norton Award |
| Major Awards | British Fantasy Awards |
| Major Awards | British SF Association Awards |
| Major Awards | John W. Campbell Memorial Award |
| Major Awards | Chesley Awards |
| Major Awards | Arthur C. Clarke Award |
| Major Awards | International Fantasy Award |
| Major Awards | Philip K. Dick Award |
| Major Awards | Ray Bradbury Award |
| Major Awards | Shirley Jackson Award |
| Major Awards | Bram Stoker Award |
| Major Awards | Theodore Sturgeon Memorial Award |
| Major Awards | Otherwise Award |
| Other Awards | Locus Award |
| Other Awards | Aurealis Award |
| Other Awards | Aurora Awards |
| Other Awards | Ditmar Award |
| Other Awards | Endeavour Award |
| Other Awards | Kitschies |
| Other Awards | Mythopoeic Awards |
| Other Awards | Prometheus Award |
| Other Awards | Sidewise Award |
| Other Awards | Spectrum Award |
| Other Awards | Sunburst Award |

The SFADB also has a citations directory for each author, containing a list of critical works and reading guides where their books have been cited. In 2018, it added indexes for "Year's Best" anthologies of short fiction, with contents linked to the individual author pages.

== Sources ==
- Dozois, Gardner, ed. (2011). The Year's Best Science Fiction: Twenty-Eighth Annual Collection. St. Martin's Press.
- Walton, Jo (2018). An Informal History of the Hugos. Tor Books.
