= Spires of Altdorf =

Spires of Altdorf is a 2005 role-playing game adventure published by Black Industries for Warhammer Fantasy Roleplay.

== Plot summary ==
Spires of Altdorf is an adventure in which the player characters are sent into the intrigue‑choked capital of the Empire to seek the second artifact of their quest, offering a full adventure plus an in‑depth guide to Altdorf as the middle chapter of the Paths of the Damned trilogy.

== Reviews ==
- Pyramid
- Warpstone #26
- Gwiezdny Pirat (Issue 20 - Apr 2007)
