= Blood and Honor =

Blood and Honor may refer to:

== Politics ==
- Blood and Honor (German: Blut und Ehre), the motto of the Hitler Youth
- Blood & Honour, a UK neo-Nazi music promotion network and political group
- Blood and Honor, a 1936 book of essays by Nazi theoretician Alfred Rosenberg

== Arts and entertainment ==
- Blood and Honor: Youth Under Hitler (German: Blut und Ehre: Jugend Unter Hitler), a German/American made for TV mini-series
- Blood and Honor (novel), a novel set in the fictional Dungeons & Dragons Eberron setting
- Star Trek: Deep Space Nine – Blood & Honor, a Star Trek one-shot comic book published by Malibu Comics (May 1995)

== See also ==
- Honour & Blood, a 1984 Tank album
- Blood and soil
