= Doomstones: Death Rock =

Doomstones: Death Rock is a 1990 role-playing adventure for Warhammer Fantasy Roleplay published by Games Workshop. It is the third of the four books in the Doomstone adventure series, following Doomstones: Blood in Darkness and continued with Doomstones: Dwarf Wars.

== Plot summary ==
Doomstones: Death Rock is an adventure in which the player characters try to find the third crystal of power by searching an ancient monastery.

== Publication history ==
Death Rock was written by Basil Barrett with Brad Freeman and Graeme Davis, with illustrations by Tony Ackland, and was published by Flame Publications in 1990 as a 104-page book. The Watchers of the Sacred Flame was revised for Warhammer and republished as Death Rock.

== Reception ==
Anthony Ragan reviewed Doomstones 3: Death Rock in White Wolf #30 (Feb., 1992), rating it a 3 out of 5 and stated that "In the end [...] Death Rock is a fine adventure that should give WFRP players and GMs a ripping good time."
