= Tooth and Claw =

Tooth and Claw is a phrase from Alfred, Lord Tennyson's poem In Memoriam A.H.H. It could refer to:

- Tooth and Claw (Doctor Who), a television episode
- Tooth and Claw (short story collection), by T. C. Boyle
- Tooth and Claw (novel), by Jo Walton
- "Tooth and Claw", a song by Animals as Leaders off the album The Joy of Motion
