= Farthing (novel) =

2006 novel by Jo Walton

- Tor Books hardcover
- Author: Jo Walton
- Language: English
- Series: "Small Change"
- Genre: Alternate history
- Publisher: Tor Books
- Publication date: 8 August 2006
- Publication place: United States
- Media type: Print (Hardcover)
- Pages: 320 (hardcover edition)
- ISBN: 0-7653-1421-5 (hardcover edition)
- OCLC: 62421152
- Dewey Decimal: 823/.92 22
- LC Class: PR6073.A448 F37 2006
- Followed by: Ha'penny

Farthing is an alternate history novel written by Welsh-Canadian writer Jo Walton and published by Tor Books. It was first published on 8 August 2006. A sequel, Ha'penny, was released in October 2007 by Tor Books. A third novel in the series, Half a Crown, was released in September 2008, also from Tor, and a short story, "Escape to Other Worlds with Science Fiction", was published on Tor.com in February 2009.

== Background ==
The novel is an alternate history set in 1949. Ha'penny details that the critical difference is the failure of the United States to provide aid to Britain in 1940. With Britain lacking American support, Hess's entreaties for peace negotiations were accepted and have led to a peace between the United Kingdom and Nazi Germany, against Winston Churchill's wishes, and to the British withdrawal from World War II, which continues mainly as a stalemate between Germany and the Soviet Union. Charles Lindbergh is the president of the United States, a peaceful country that never became involved in the conflict and is seeking closer economic ties with Japan's Greater East Asia Co-Prosperity Sphere.

The novel was inspired by Walton's analysis of the setting of Josephine Tey's Brat Farrar.

== Plot ==
=== Introduction ===
The book begins with the murder of Sir James Thirkie, a member of the "Farthing Set" and the architect of the "Farthing Peace" between the United Kingdom and Germany. The Farthing Set, so named for their association with the country house of that name (and analogous to the real-life Cliveden set) prominently supported prewar appeasement, a policy vindicated by the war's outcome. The narrative alternates between the first-person account of Lucy Kahn, daughter of the proprietors of the Farthing estate, and a third-person narrative that focuses on Scotland Yard Inspector Peter Carmichael, the lead investigator assigned to the case.

=== Summary ===
At a weekend party at Farthing House, a large country house in Hampshire, Sir James Thirkie, a prominent politician who is considered likely to become a leading minister in an upcoming cabinet shuffle, is found murdered in his room, with a yellow Star of David pinned to his chest. Though suspicion immediately falls upon David Kahn, the only Jew invited to the party, the lead investigator, Inspector Peter Carmichael, is unconvinced. Carmichael, who was sent with Sergeant Royston from Scotland Yard to investigate the murder, suspects that the star was placed on the body to divert attention towards David. Equally skeptical is David's wife Lucy, the daughter of estate owner Lord Eversley, who notes the tension between Thirke's newly-pregnant wife, Angela, and Angela's sister, Daphne, who was having an affair with Thirke.

As Carmichael begins his investigation, he requests the assembled guests to remain at the house. Chafing at the oppressive atmosphere, Lucy accepts an offer from her father to go riding, but while they are out, they are attacked by a young man, who shoots at them with a rifle before he is killed by Lord Eversley. An inspection of the body uncovers a membership card identifying him as a communist and an identity card for an Alan Brown, which is different from the name on the party identity card. Carmichael is puzzled by the incident, which appears to be unconnected to Thirke's murder. As pressure grows for Carmichael to release the guests, a search of the Kahns' apartment turns up letters that offer evidence of David's involvement with an underground Jewish organization, which sought the murder of Thirke and the other members of the "Farthing Set". Aware that an arrest would mean the effective conviction of David but still not convinced of his guilt, Carmichael convinces him to remain at Farthing House under police supervision.

Returning to London, Carmichael is given until Friday to conclude the case. His ability to act is further hampered by the political situation since Daphne's husband, Mark Normanby, the Foreign Secretary and one of the guests in Farthing House, emerges from the cabinet shuffle as Prime Minister. Exploiting both Thirke's murder and the shooting incident, Normanby announces the introduction of identity cards, the expulsion of foreign nationals, the banning of communists and a delay in the general election. Resisting political pressure to arrest David, Carmichael pursues his investigation of Angela and discovers that her baby was likely the result of an affair with the family's chauffeur. Locating Brown's girlfriend, an Agnes Timms, in Southend-on-Sea, Carmichael travels there with Royston to interview the young woman and discovers that Brown was approached by Angela to stage the attack on Lord Eversley, ostensibly as a joke. Returning to London, Carmichael learns that the yellow star was purchased by someone who claimed to be David. With a warrant now issued to arrest David, Carmichael calls to warn the Kahns and so they have time to escape.

With the Kahns now on the run, Carmichael goes to Wales to interview Thirke's mother, who recounts Angela's admission that she helped Lord Eversley and Mark Normanby murder her husband. While he returns to London to arrest Angela and Normanby, however, Carmichael discovers that Agnes has been murdered. Undaunted, Carmichael presents his findings to Penn-Barkis, the head of Scotland Yard, and identifies the involvement of the three suspects in a conspiracy to murder Thirke and place the blame on the Jews for it. After he listens to Carmichael's description, Penn-Barkis orders Carmichael to drop the case and uses Carmichael's homosexuality to blackmail him into acquiescing in the official story.

== Reception ==
Freida Murray's review for Booklist called "the characters are highly plausible, and in every aspect, from the petty snobbery hampering the inspector to the we-don't-do-that-here conclusion the plot encourages warily reconsidering the daily news." Kirkus Reviews commented that "despite a rather fumbling approach, Walton's sinister political conspiracies pack a considerable wallop."

== Awards and nominations ==
It was nominated for a Nebula Award, a Quill Award, the John W. Campbell Memorial Award for best science fiction novel, the Locus Award and the Sidewise Award for Alternate History.

It won the Romantic Times 2006 Reviewers' Choice Award for Best Science Fiction Novel.

== See also ==
- Axis victory in World War II, regarding works of Nazi Germany/Axis/World War II alternate history
