= Small Change trilogy =

Series of novels by Jo Walton

The Small Change trilogy is a series of alternate history thriller novels by the author Jo Walton that were published from 2006 to 2008. The series is set in a Europe in which the United Kingdom exits World War II in 1941. As the series begins, Britain itself slides toward fascism.

- Farthing Tor Books August 8, 2006, ISBN 0-7653-1421-5, ISBN 978-0-7653-1421-5
- Ha'penny, Tor Books; Reprint edition July 1, 2008, ISBN 0-7653-5808-5, ISBN 978-0-7653-5808-0
- Half a Crown, Tor Books; September 30, 2008, ISBN 0-7653-1621-8, ISBN 978-0-7653-1621-9

The short story, "Escape to Other Worlds with Science Fiction," is set in the United States of the same world as the Small Change trilogy
