= Lichemaster =

Lichemaster is a 1990 role-playing adventure for Warhammer Fantasy Roleplay published by Games Workshop.

== Plot summary ==
Lichemaster is an adventure in which the player characters must prevent an undead army from being deployed in a five-part adventure scenario.

== Publication history ==
Lichemaster was written by Carl Sargent and Rick Priestley with Graeme Davis, with a cover by Gary Chalk, and was published by Flame Publications in 1990 as a 104-page book.

== Reception ==
Anthony Ragan reviewed the adventure as Return of the Lichemaster in White Wolf #30 (Feb., 1992), rating it a 2 out of 5 and stated that "Unfortunately, this adventure falls flat in the end. The encounters are pre-determined and very linear, giving the players little choices in their actions.."

== Reviews ==
- Games Review (Volume 2, Issue 8 - May 1990)
- Warpstone (Issue 23 - Spring 2005)
