= Plundered Vaults =

Role-playing game adventure

Plundered Vaults is a 2005 role-playing game adventure published by Black Industries for Warhammer Fantasy Roleplay.

== Plot summary ==
Plundered Vaults is an adventure in which an anthology offers six ready‑to‑run scenarios filled with cults, corruption, horror, and intrigue for both new and veteran player characters.

== Reviews ==
- Pyramid
- Warpstone (Issue 25 - Spring 2006)
