= King's peace =

King's peace or the King's Peace may refer to:

- King's peace (law), also queen's peace, a term in Anglo-Saxon law and later in English law and common law
- Peace of Antalcidas, between Ancient Greek city-states and Persia
- The King's Peace (novel), by Jo Walton, 2000

== See also ==
- Landfrieden, under the law of the Holy Roman Empire
