= The Lost Shrine of Kasar-Khan =

Role-playing game supplement

- Writers: Simon Forrest, Basil Barrett
- Publishers: Integrated Games
- Publication: 1985
- Genres: Role-playing

The Lost Shrine of Kasar-Khan is an adventure published by Integrated Games in 1985 for fantasy role-playing games.

== Plot summary ==
The Lost Shrine of Kasar-Khan is a role-playing scenario and gamemaster's aid written for any role-playing game system — conversion rules for Dungeons & Dragons, Advanced Dungeons & Dragons, and RuneQuest are included. The setting is an ancient dwarven shrine that is guarded by a demon. The players must overcome the demon, other creatures, and a war party that is also exploring the dungeon.

== Publication history ==
Between 1984 and 1986, Simon Forrest and Basil Barrett wrote a series of four fantasy role-playing adventures that were published by Integrated Games as The Complete Dungeon Master Series. The second adventure, published in 1985, was The Lost Shrine of Kasar-Khan, written by Forrest and Barrett, with interior art by Jon Baker, Selina Goodman, and Brendan Hickling, cartography by Justin Gregory and Allen Hickling, and cover art by Jez Goodwin. It was published by Integrated Games in 1985 as a boxed set containing

- a 16-page booklet with a complete adventure
- the book's cardstock cover also doubled as a gamemaster's screen
- six sheets of color cardstock floor plans
- four sheets of NPC statistics
- four sheets of player handouts

This scenario is the sequel to the adventure The Halls of the Dwarven Kings and is the precursor to the adventures The Watchers of the Sacred Flame and The Feathered Priests. Integrated Games went out of business before a planned fifth adventure, Deep Water, Shallow Graves, was published.

In 1992, Flame Publications, an imprint of Games Workshop, bought the rights to The Complete Dungeon Master Series, and Simon Forrest, Brad Freeman and Graeme Davis revised all four adventures to conform to the Warhammer Fantasy Roleplay rules, releasing them as the Doomstone Campaign Book Series. The Lost Shrine of Kasar-Khan was retitled Blood in Darkness.

== Reception ==
In the October 1985 edition of White Dwarf (Issue #70), Megan C Robertson warned that "this is not a module that can be run with minimal presentation." Robertson called the presentation of the adventure "well done", and also liked the NPC and monster stats printed on separate cardstock, "eliminating wild thumbing through the module at a critical moment." She lauded the player handouts such as a map, fragments from a prayer book, and the page of a diary, calling them "the most striking of the 'extras'." However, she found the overall dungeon "lacking in originality until the later stages." She concluded by giving the module an above average rating of 8 out of 10, calling it "a module which overall pays much attention to those little details that make an adventure just that little bit special for DM and players alike; a worthy effort that bodes fair to set new standards in scenario presentation."

== Other reviews ==
- The V.I.P. of Gaming Magazine #3 (April/May, 1986)
- Warpstone #16 (Summer 2001 - "Who Are the Feathered Priests?")
