= Better Angels =

Better Angels may refer to:

- Better Angels (album), a recording by Peter Bernstein
- "Better Angels" (The Walking Dead), an episode of the AMC television series The Walking Dead
- "Better Angels" (Agent Carter), an episode of the second season of Agent Carter
- "Better Angels" (FlashForward), an episode of the American television series FlashForward
- "Better Angels" (NCIS), an episode of the American police procedural drama NCIS
- "Better Angels" (Supergirl), an episode of the first season of Supergirl
- Better Angels (novel), a science fiction novel by Howard V. Hendrix
- Braver Angels (formerly known as Better Angels), an initiative of the Institute for American Values to depolarize US politics

== See also ==
- The Better Angels, a 1979 thriller novel by Charles McCarry
- The Better Angels (film), a 2014 biographical film
- The Better Angels of Our Nature, a 2011 book by Steven Pinker
- Abraham Lincoln's first inaugural address, wherein the phrase better angels is used
