= Warhammer Fantasy Character Pack =

Warhammer Fantasy Character Pack is a 1987 role-playing game supplement published by Games Workshop for Warhammer Fantasy Roleplay.

== Contents ==
Warhammer Fantasy Character Pack is a supplement in which character record sheets were accompanied by rules for fleshing out a character's background, including details like origin, family ties, physical appearance, and naming conventions. The second edition did not include those rules, offering instead a setting description of a bustling city inn.

== Publication history ==
Character Pack was written by Paul Cockburn, with a cover by Bob Naismith and published by Games Workshop in 1987 as a pad of 50 character sheets, a 16-page booklet, and an outer folder. The second edition features a cover by Graeme Davis and was published by Flame Publications in 1990.

== Reception ==
Lawrence Schick described the second edition as "less cool".

== Reviews ==
- Computer and Video Games
- The Games Machine
