= Castle Drachenfels =

Castle Drachenfels is a 1992 role-playing adventure for Warhammer Fantasy Roleplay published by Games Workshop.

== Plot summary ==
Castle Drachenfels is an adventure in which the palace of the Great Enchanter is detailed.

== Reception ==
Anthony Ragan reviewed Castle Drachenfels in White Wolf #35 (March/April, 1993), rating it a 4 out of 5 and stated that "If I have but criticism of the work, it lies with the perfect-bound format. The nice handouts are all bound at the back, requiring the GM to either cut up his expensive book or risk mangling it at a photocopier. This quibble aside, though, Castle Drachenfels is a fine addition to the WFRP line that I highly recommend."

== Reviews ==
- Australian Realms #7
- Warpstone (Issue 15 - Winter 2000/01)
