= Ashes of Middenheim =

Role-plying game supplement

Ashes of Middenheim is a 2005 role-playing game adventure published by Black Industries for Warhammer Fantasy Roleplay.

== Plot summary ==
Ashes of Middenheim is an adventure in which the opening adventure of the Paths of the Damned trilogy sends the player characters into a besieged, corruption‑ridden Middenheim to uncover heresy, murder, and Chaos plots that threaten to bring the city's defenses crashing down.

== Reviews ==
- Pyramid
- Warpstone (Issue 26 - Autumn 2006)
