= Or What You Will =

Metafictional fantasy novel by Jo Walton

First edition

Or What You Will is a 2020 metafictional fantasy novel by Jo Walton, about immortality and creativity. It was first published by Tor Books.

== Synopsis ==
As fantasy author Sylvia Harrison nears the end of her life, her imaginary friend — a separate consciousness who has lived inside her head since childhood, whom she has used as the basis for all her favorite characters, and who will die when she does — devises a plan to make them both immortal... a plan which involves the book Sylvia is currently writing.

== Reception ==
Or What You Will won the 2022 Mythopoeic Fantasy Award for Adult Literature.

Vox called Or What you Will "a playful book about breaking through constraints and expanding past your limits", which despite being "narrated by an incorporeal spirit" is infused with "a deep and palpable and sensual joy: of food, of art, of history, of books and learning".

Publishers Weekly considered it a "gorgeous, deeply philosophical work" and a "nuanced meditation on reality and fiction", lauding Walton for "shift(ing) effortlessly between Sylvia's life, Florentine history, and the plot unfolding in [Sylvia's novel-in-progress]".

Kirkus Reviews observed the presence of Marsilio Ficino and Giovanni Pico della Mirandola, historical figures who play major roles in several of Walton's other novels, but noted that the novel "doesn't have quite the philosophical heft of those prior works" and is instead "a deeply personal work and a charming love letter to Florence."

In Locus, Gary K. Wolfe lauded it as "undeniably touching", with "sharp critical insights about fantasy" that help to make the novel "a critical fiction, carrying on its own negotiations between differing ideas of history, biography, and imagination".

== Origins ==
Walton has described the novel's origins as including a visit to Florence at the invitation of Ada Palmer, a panel at a science fiction convention in which James D. Macdonald described having a repertory theatre of characters in his head, and an overall dissatisfaction with the endings of The Tempest and Twelfth Night.
