= The Just City =

2015 science fiction/fantasy novel written by Jo Walton

- Hardcover edition
- Author: Jo Walton
- Language: English
- Series: Thessaly
- Genre: Fantasy
- Publisher: Tor
- Publication date: January 2015
- Publication place: United States
- Pages: 368 (Hardcover)
- ISBN: 978-0-7653-3266-0
- Followed by: The Philosopher Kings

The Just City is a science fiction/fantasy novel by Jo Walton, published by Tor Books in January 2015. It is the first book of the Thessaly trilogy. The sequel The Philosopher Kings was published in June 2015, and the final volume, Necessity, in July 2016.

== Synopsis ==
The Greek goddess Athene plans an experiment around Plato's Republic, and Apollo decides to join her, but wants to do it as an incarnate human. She collects people from throughout history who have prayed to her that they wish they could live in Plato's Republic, and places them on the island of Thera prior to its volcanic destruction. Apollo blends in with the 10,000 human children the city "masters" acquire from slave markets. The masters raise the children to achieve the ideal society as described in Plato's Republic. Socrates' arrival in the fifth year of the city precipitates a crisis.

== Characters ==
The characters include:

- Pytheas, mortal incarnation of Apollo, god of literature, the arts, and knowledge through intuition.
- Maia, young woman from the Victorian era.
- Simmea, an Egyptian girl brought to the Just City from a slave market as a child.
- Kebes, Simmea's friend and an agitator who considers the city a continuation of his enslavement.
- Athene, goddess of wisdom and knowledge through study.
- Adeimantus, Benjamin Jowett, British translator of Plato.
- Aristomache, Ellen Francis Mason, American translator of Plato.
- Atticus, Titus Pomponius Atticus, Roman friend of Cicero.
- Marsilio Ficino, Florentine Neoplatonist.
- Ikaros, Giovanni Pico della Mirandola, Italian philosopher.
- Krito, Socrates' friend.
- Lukretia, Lucrezia Borgia, Italian aristocrat.
- Anicius Manlius Severinus Boethius, Roman philosopher.
- Plotinus, Roman philosopher.
- Sokrates, Athenian philosopher.
- Marcus Tullius Cicero, Roman politician.

== Reception ==
At NPR, Amal El-Mohtar called City "(b)rilliant, compelling, and frankly unputdownable", comparing it to a Socratic dialogue, while at Booklist, Michael Cart described it as a "remarkable novel of ideas", conceding that it may be somewhat "abstruse", but emphasizing that this does not detract from the quality of its plot and characterization.

Publishers Weekly stated that City was "impressively ambitious", but criticized Walton for overuse of sexual violence and for a "reductive" portrayal of the Greek gods. Similarly, Kirkus Reviews considered the protagonists to "have a certain appeal", but stated that the novel was "more thought experiment than plot".

The Spanish-language translation, La ciudad justa, was a finalist for the 2022 Premio Ignotus.
