= The Labyrinth Key =

2004 novel by Howard V. Hendrix

- Author: Howard V. Hendrix
- Cover artist: Stainislaw Fernandes
- Language: English
- Series: Tetragrammaton Series
- Genre: Science fiction
- Publisher: Random House, Inc.
- Publication date: March 2004
- Publication place: United States
- Media type: Print (paperback)
- Pages: 448 (1st edition, paperback)
- ISBN: 0-345-45596-7 (1st edition, paperback)

The Labyrinth Key is a science fiction novel by American writer Howard V. Hendrix, first published in 2004.

== Plot introduction ==
The backdrop for this story is an informational arms races between a future United States of America and China. Both countries are attempting to build a quantum computer, which they believe will be the ultimate information weapon, creating and breaking encryption schemes. One of the American investigators, Dr. Jaron L. Kwok, is mysteriously killed while in Hong Kong, and his mathematical understudy Ben Cho is ordered to pick up Kwok's investigation in an attempt to find out why and how he died.

Running parallel to this storyline are the lives of Don Markham (known as Don Strum in Cybernesia) and Lu Mei-lin (also known as Marilyn Lu). Don is a computer programmer whose work specializes in the virtual reality world Cybernesia. Lu is a forensic detective who works in Hong Kong. After Kwok's death she is the leading detective on the case, called to Sha Tin by the Guoanbo, China's version of the CIA and its leader in the race for the quantum computer.

At the time of Kwok's death a holocaust is disseminated throughout the world, showing the circumstances of the virtual reality world that he had died in. However, his death prompts not only the US and China, but multiple other organizations (from terrorists to secret societies) to go to any lengths for the chance to get binotech, the newest technology that reduplicates itself and stores a huge amount of information in tiny quantities.

== Reception ==
Regina Schroeder in his review for Booklist said that "Layers of secret ruling societies, interconnections between historical cryptography and the work of the tale’s own cutting-edge scientists (including everything from Matteo Ricci’s memory palaces to the Cabala), and an unexpected danger to reality combine with political scheming in this tight thriller with a clever historical basis." Publishers Weekly in their review said "the book features abstruse speculation on memory and forgetting, on the making and breaking of secrets and the mind's ability to manipulate the quantum nature of reality. Unfortunately, the earnestness of conspiracy theory punctures the dizzying metaphysical bubbles Hendrix blows, leaving the story a bit flat. And in an infinitude of infinite universes, where everything occurs, tragedy loses its significance and sting."

== Release details ==
- 2004, United States of America, Random House Inc. ISBN 0-345-45596-7, Pub date March 2004, Paperback
- 2006, United States of America, Random House Inc. ISBN 0-345-45597-5, Pub date January 2006, Paperback
- 2006, United States of America, Random House Inc. ISBN 0-345-49102-5, Pub date January 2006, Electronic
