= Dungeon Lairs =

Dungeon Lairs is a supplement published by Games Workshop in 1987 for the fantasy role-playing game Warhammer Fantasy Roleplay (WFRP).

== Description ==
Dungeon Lairs is a set of generic full-colour floorplans of monster lairs for use with 25 mm miniatures in a fantasy role-playing game. The supplement contains 15 rooms on twelve A4 cardstock sheets:

- Sewer
- Underground Complex
- Troll Cave
- Chaotic Cave
- Chaotic Temple
- Ancient Temple
- Tumulus
- Goblin Hall (on two sheets)
- Mossy Cave
- Root Cave
- Flooded Cave
- Ice Cave
- Chaotic Throne Room

The supplement also includes a 12-page booklet with tables of random encounters and treasures for each of the floorplans.

== Publication history ==
Games Workshop first published Warhammer Fantasy Roleplay in 1986. The supplement Dungeon Lairs was published the following year, a boxed set with artwork by Dave Andrews and Colin Dixon.

== Reception ==
Graeme Davis reviewed Dungeon Lairs for White Dwarf #91, and stated that "If you use floorplans, Dungeon Lairs will definitely be a worthwhile addition to your collection. Even if you don't, it might be worth a look - the sample dungeon is readily plunderable for ideas, and the supplemental WFRP material might be useful if you GM that game."
