= Necessity (novel) =

2016 novel by Jo Walton

- Hardcover edition
- Author: Jo Walton
- Series: Thessaly
- Genre: fantasy / science fiction
- Publisher: Tor Books
- Publication date: 2016
- Pages: 331 (hardcover)
- ISBN: 978-0-7653-7902-3
- Preceded by: The Philosopher Kings

Necessity is a fantasy/science fiction novel by the Welsh–Canadian author Jo Walton, published by Tor Books in 2016. It is the conclusion of the Thessaly trilogy and the sequel to The Just City and The Philosopher Kings, which were both published in 2015.

== Synopsis ==
In The Just City a city was created by the time-traveling goddess Athena on the island of Thera prior to its Iron Age volcanic destruction. It was then populated by philosophers and children from all ages of human history and organized on the principles of Plato's Republic, which turned out not to work so well in practice. In The Philosopher Kings the single original city had split into a dozen: five feuding ones on Thera and another eight on other islands where it was discovered that the inhabitants were preaching Christianity to Iron Age Greeks. In large part because of the anachronistic introduction of Christianity, all of the cities were relocated by Zeus to an uninhabited far-off planet in the 26th century, which the cities' inhabitants promptly named Plato.

Necessity begins forty years after these events, on the day the mortal form of the god Apollo, who had chosen to live as a human in the original city, finally dies, and he takes up his divine powers again. That same day also sees the first contact between Plato and wider humanity, as a human spaceship appears in orbit and opens communications. Apollo, however, is more concerned with the disappearance of his sister Athene, who, as it turns out, has gone into the Chaos which exists before and after time, in search of knowledge. The rescue of the wayward goddess involves a great deal of intrigue, time travel, and even alien gods. Walton revisits familiar characters from her previous books (both Giovanni Pico della Mirandola and Socrates make an appearance), introduces some new ones and ties up loose ends.

== Reception ==
In general, Necessity was received as "an adequately satisfying conclusion to [the] Thessaly trilogy," albeit with some reservations, specifically with regards to the description (or lack thereof) of the (re)contact between the Platonic civilization and wider humanity. This was "initially touted as a major event," but "[r]ather than engage with the intriguing philosophical and ethical issues presented by this reconnection," the story focuses primarily on divine matters, and "the reader never gets to truly witness the culture clash [...]."

Publishers Weekly describes Walton's choice to select her narrating characters "from a broader cross-section of society" as "fresh and delightful", although it points out that "[t]he mortal characters are given tragically short shrift." Its conclusion, in keeping with platonic philosophy, is that Necessity will probably "leave readers wishing this story had strived for greater excellence." Kirkus Reviews is kinder to Necessity, calling it "a glorious kitchen sink of genre, combining philosophy, time travel, aliens, and the gods." It sees the plot as "mostly ... an excuse to explore whether or not Athene’s experiment is still working, discuss the nature of the soul, and engage in character development," and concludes the book is "[e]ngaging food for thought."
