= The King's Name =

2001 novel by Jo Walton

- Tor Books hardcover
- Author: Jo Walton
- Cover artist: Julie Bell
- Language: English
- Series: Sulien
- Genre: Fantasy
- Publisher: Tor Books
- Publication date: December 2001 (1st edition)
- Publication place: United States
- Media type: Print (Hardcover)
- Pages: 368 (hardcover, 1st edition)
- ISBN: 0-312-87653-X (hardcover, 1st edition)
- OCLC: 47289635
- Dewey Decimal: 823/.92 21
- LC Class: PR6073.A448 K54 2001
- Preceded by: The King's Peace

The King's Name is a fantasy novel by Welsh-Canadian writer Jo Walton, published by Tor Books in October 2001. It was Walton's second novel and a sequel to her first, The King's Peace. A prequel, The Prize in the Game, was published in 2002.

== Plot summary ==
Sulien ap Gwien, a woman warrior and the ruler of a small part of the island of Tir Tanagiri, finds herself unwillingly drawn into a civil war that pits brother against brother and sister against sister. After surviving an attempted poisoning, she discovers that the sorcerer Morthu, an old enemy, is stirring up discontent and rebellion against her friend the High King. Sulien must bring together an unlikely group of allies and do battle in both the physical and the spiritual world to defeat the sorcerer and restore the rule of law.
