= The Prize in the Game =

2002 novel by Jo Walton

- Tor Books hardcover
- Author: Jo Walton
- Cover artist: Jean Pierre Targete
- Language: English
- Genre: Fantasy
- Publisher: Tor Books
- Publication date: December 2002 (1st edition)
- Publication place: United States
- Media type: Print (Hardcover)
- Pages: 256 (hardcover, 1st edition)
- ISBN: 0-7653-0263-2 (hardcover, 1st edition)
- OCLC: 49873356
- Dewey Decimal: 823/.92 21
- LC Class: PR6073.A448 P75 2002
- Followed by: The King's Peace

The Prize in the Game is a fantasy novel by Welsh-Canadian writer Jo Walton, published by Tor Books in December 2002. The novel is a prequel to Walton's first two novels, The King's Peace (2000) and The King's Name (2001); its main characters appear as minor or off-stage characters in those books. The story was loosely inspired by the Táin Bó Cúailnge.
