= Doomstones: Heart of Chaos =

Doomstones: Heart of Chaos is a 2001 role-playing game supplement published by Hogshead Publishing for Warhammer Fantasy Roleplay.

== Contents ==
Doomstones: Heart of Chaos is a supplement in which the player characters have gathered the doomstones and the powers that be in the realm of chaos take notice.

== Reviews ==
- Pyramid
- Backstab
- Backstab (as "Coeur du Chaos")
- Warpstone (Issue 20 - Summer 2003)
- Strike to Stun (Issue 1 - Sep 2001)
