= The Halls of the Dwarven Kings =

Tabletop role-playing game adventure

Box cover, 1984

The Halls of the Dwarven Kings is an adventure published by Integrated Games in 1984 for any role-playing game system.

== Plot summary ==
The Halls of the Dwarven Kings is an adventure in which the player characters must explore the ruins of a vast dwarven city to find and recover the crown of a dwarven king from ancient times. It is designed to be used with any fantasy role-playing system; suggestions for converting statistics to systems similar to Advanced Dungeons & Dragons and RuneQuest are included.

== Publication history ==
Integrated Games planned a five-part fantasy role-playing adventure series called The Complete Dungeon Master Series. Between 1984 and 1987, Simon Forrest and Basil Barrett wrote four adventures, the first in 1984 being The Halls of the Dwarven Kings, a boxed set containing a 24-page book, an 8-page pamphlet, a 12-page illustration booklet, a cardstock screen, 12 colour cardstock floor plans, and 4 pages of play aids. Artwork was by Judith Hickling, Jes Goodwin, Jon Baker, Paul Ward, Toby Hardwick, and Selina Goodman.

The sequels that followed were The Lost Shrine of Kasar-Khan, The Watchers of the Sacred Flame, and The Feathered Priests. Integrated Games went out of business before a planned fifth adventure, Deep Water, Shallow Graves, was published.

In 1992, Flame Publications, an imprint of Games Workshop, bought the rights to The Complete Dungeon Master Series, and Simon Forrest, Brad Freeman and Graeme Davis revised all four adventures to conform to the Warhammer Fantasy Roleplay rules, releasing them as the Doomstone Campaign Book Series. The first adventure in the series, The Halls of the Dwarven Kings, was retitled Fire in the Mountains.

== Reception ==
In the April 1985 edition of Imagine (Issue 25), Paul Cockburn was impressed by the sheer amount of game material in the box, saying, "no purchaser is likely to be disappointed. This is a lavishly-equipped DM aid." However, Cockburn was disappointed with the adventure, believing that players were encouraged to fight first rather than role-play. He pointed out that "there is an excellent plot going on in the background, which the players can only truly understand through interaction with the NPCs — don't let the fighting start from the first room." He concluded, "This is a good package. If it is not a great scenario, it certainly isn't one of the worst that I've ever run, and with some creative alterations, can be very good."

In the June 1985 edition of White Dwarf (Issue #66), B.Y. Rowe called this adventure "a new concept in gaming: everything for the harassed DM is done, all cross-referenced, reviewed, illustrated and explained." However, Rowe found the 12 pages of illustrations were "not up to normal artwork status." Rowe praised the gamemaster's screen for having an entire keyed floorplan, and said "the real bonuses are the cut-out maps, scrolls and artifacts." Rowe concluded by giving the adventure an above average rating of 8 out of 10, saying, "Halls of the Dwarven Kings is perfect as an illustration of how to set up an adventure; the DM need only read the background and then the characters can begin. This is the first of a new series and promises to be a worthwhile addition to any DM's armoury of adventures."

In the July 1988 edition of Dragon (Issue #135), Ken Rolston called the player handouts "remarkable game aids and props", and noted with approval that "a particularly fine touch is that not all of these handouts are really significant." He also admired the floor plans, calling them "well-designed" and "clearly rendered, not cluttered with illustration-style detail." He also thought the gamemaster screen was "the most useful, detailed and well-designed DM screen I've ever used." Rolston did note that the dungeon was very complex; while he admitted that the result was "pretty spectatcular", he warned that "studying and understanding the Dwarven Halls is no simple matter." He concluded with a strong recommendation for this and the other three adventures in the Complete Dungeon Master Series, saying, "On presentation alone, it qualifies for the FRPG Supplement Hall of Fame. Experienced gamers should love it. Rookies may love it, too, but may find it too complex and sophisticated. Above all, Halls of the Dwarven Kings is unique for the amount of detail and variety of play aids lavished on a single scenario setting."

== Reviews ==
- Jeux & Stratégie #32
