= Doomstones: Dwarf Wars =

Doomstones: Dwarf Wars is a 1990 role-playing adventure for Warhammer Fantasy Roleplay published by Games Workshop. It is the fourth and last book in the Doomstone adventure series, following Doomstones: Death Rock.

== Plot summary ==
Doomstones: Dwarf Wars is an adventure in which the player characters search the ruins of a Dwarfhold for the Stone of Water.

== Publication history ==
The Feathered Priests was revised for Warhammer and republished as Dwarf Wars. Doomstones was the second significant adventure campaign published by Games Workshop for Warhammer Fantasy Roleplay.

== Reception ==
Anthony Ragan reviewed Doomstones 4: Dwarf Wars in White Wolf #28 (Aug./Sept., 1991), rating it a 3 out of 5 and stated that "Dwarf Wars is a good addition to the WFRP line and is worth the GM's time and money."
