= GURPS Celtic Myth =

1995 supplement for the GURPS role-playing game

- Designers: Ken Walton; Jo Walton
- Publishers: Steve Jackson Games
- Publication: 1995; 31 years ago
- Genres: Fantasy Iron Age Celts
- Systems: GURPS

GURPS Celtic Myth is an Iron Age Celtic supplement for the GURPS (Generic Universal Role-Playing System), written by Ken Walton and Jo Walton, and published by Steve Jackson Games in 1996.

== Contents ==
GURPS Celtic Myth is a softcover book of Iron Age Celtic culture written by the then husband and wife team of Ken Walton, co-founder of Cakebread & Walton, and novelist Jo Walton. It supports a gamemaster in designing a GURPS campaign set in ancient Ireland or Scotland. The first half of the book gives an overview of Celtic history and literature. The second half of the book, entitled "Celtic Myth", delves into how ancient magic could be woven into a GURPS campaign. This includes shapeshifter duels, enchanted Snakestone beads, and letter spells using Ogham runes.

== Reception ==
In the March 1996 edition of Arcane (Issue 4), Dan Joyce liked the book, commenting that "what is here is cracking stuff. If you want to run a Celtic campaign - GURPS or otherwise - buy this book." Joyce concluded by giving the book an above-average rating of 8 out of 10.

In the July 1996 edition of Dragon (Issue 231), Rick Swan found that the history in the first half of the book "reads like a college text, expansive but a bit stuffy." However, he thought the exploration of Celtic magic in the second half of the book "comes to life." Swan concluded that making a complete Celtic campaign was too much work, saying, "I’m not convinced a Celts campaign is worth the trouble, but incorporating the druidic material into another setting — say, GURPS Camelot or GURPS Imperial Rome — could be mighty interesting."

== Reviews ==
- Casus Belli #93
- Australian Realms #28

== See also ==
- List of GURPS publications
