= My Real Children =

2014 novel by Jo Walton

- Hardcover edition
- Author: Jo Walton
- Language: English
- Genre: Fantasy literature, alternate history
- Publisher: Tor Books
- Publication date: May 20, 2014
- Publication place: United States
- Media type: Print, e-book
- Pages: 320 pp.
- Award: James Tiptree Jr. Award
- ISBN: 978-0765332653

My Real Children is a 2014 alternate history novel by Welsh-Canadian writer Jo Walton, published by Tor Books. It was released on May 20, 2014.

== Plot ==
In 2015, Patricia is 89 years old and living in a nursing home, with two mutually-exclusive sets of memories: one of a world where John F. Kennedy was killed by a bomb in 1963, and one of a world where Kennedy chose not to run in 1964 after an escalated Cuban Missile Crisis led to the nuclear obliteration of Miami and Kyiv—and, on a more personal level, one in which she went by "Trish", married a man and had four children before she was able to escape an unhappy marriage and become involved in politics, and one in which, as "Pat", she was a successful travel writer raising three children with her lesbian partner. Both feel completely real, but both cannot be – even though both sets of children visit her.

== Patricia's two worlds ==
In the Kennedy assassination timeline, there is accelerated nuclear disarmament, however. The Soviet Union liberalizes sooner and does not intervene in Hungary or Czechoslovakia when they withdraw from the Warsaw Pact peacefully. The USSR lands the first humans on the Moon in 1967 and as a result, the United States struggles to catch up in the space race in terms of construction of a space station and later, a moonbase of its own. In the Cuban War timeline, Pat, her lesbian partner Bee and their children watch aghast as Miami, Kyiv, Delhi, Tel Aviv, and several unspecified Chinese cities are subjected to nuclear attacks over a fifty-year interval. The incineration of Miami turns the United States isolationist and they do not become actively involved in the Vietnam War. The European Union becomes consolidated more rapidly than in our own world, but the European colonial powers do not pursue decolonization as it occurred within our universe. Pat encounters a devastating disease, anaplastic thyroid cancer, which kills several of her relatives as well as Bee in that universe. Trish finds a useful and constructive role in the lives of her children and grandchildren after her divorce from her obnoxious closeted gay husband Mark in the Kennedy assassination timeline, but although Pat finds herself in an idyllic relationship with Bee, despite the challenges of her lover's disablement after an IRA bombing campaign, and they raise several children, the surrounding world is darker than our own, given its intensive nuclear proliferation and the breaching of our world's taboo against the use of nuclear weapons during wartime.

== Reception ==
Lev Grossman stated that My Real Children is a "quiet triumph", and compared it to the works of Alice Munro, and to Philip K. Dick's The Man in the High Castle, while Robert Wiersema described it as having "achingly beautiful prose and carefully crafted characters". Cory Doctorow said that it was a "standout" even when compared to Walton's other works, and that it "literally kept [him] up all night, weeping uncontrollably with the most astounding mixture of joy and sorrow", while at NPR, Amal El-Mohtar said that to call the book "elegant" was not enough.

The novel won the 2014 James Tiptree, Jr. Award, and was a finalist for the 2015 World Fantasy Award—Novel, the Aurora Award for Best Novel, the 2015 Sunburst Award for Adult Novel, and the 2015 Sidewise Award for Alternate History.

== Genre ==
Walton has described the novel as an "attempt to meld the genres of women's fiction and SF."
