= International Pixel-Stained Technopeasant Day =

Commemoration celebrated on April 23

International Pixel-Stained Technopeasant Day is a commemoration declared by author Jo Walton, held on April 23 and first celebrated in 2007, in response to remarks made by Howard V. Hendrix stating that he was opposed "to the increasing presence in our organization the Science Fiction and Fantasy Writers of America of webscabs, who post their creations on the net for free". The purpose of the day, according to Walton, was to encourage writers to post "professional quality" works for free on the internet.

The name of the day originates from the assertion by Hendrix that the "webscabs" are "converting the noble calling of Writer into the life of Pixel-stained Technopeasant Wretch."

Many notable authors contributed to International Pixel-Stained Technopeasant Day 2007, including Chaz Brenchley, Steven Brust, Emma Bull, Debra Doyle, Diane Duane, Naomi Kritzer, Jay Lake, David Langford, Sharon Lee, Beth Meacham, Steve Miller, Andrew Plotkin, Robert Reed, Will Shetterly, Sherwood Smith, Ryk Spoor, Charles Stross, Catherynne M. Valente, Jo Walton, Lawrence Watt-Evans, Martha Wells and Sean Williams.
