= Howard V. Hendrix =

American novelist

Howard Vincent Hendrix
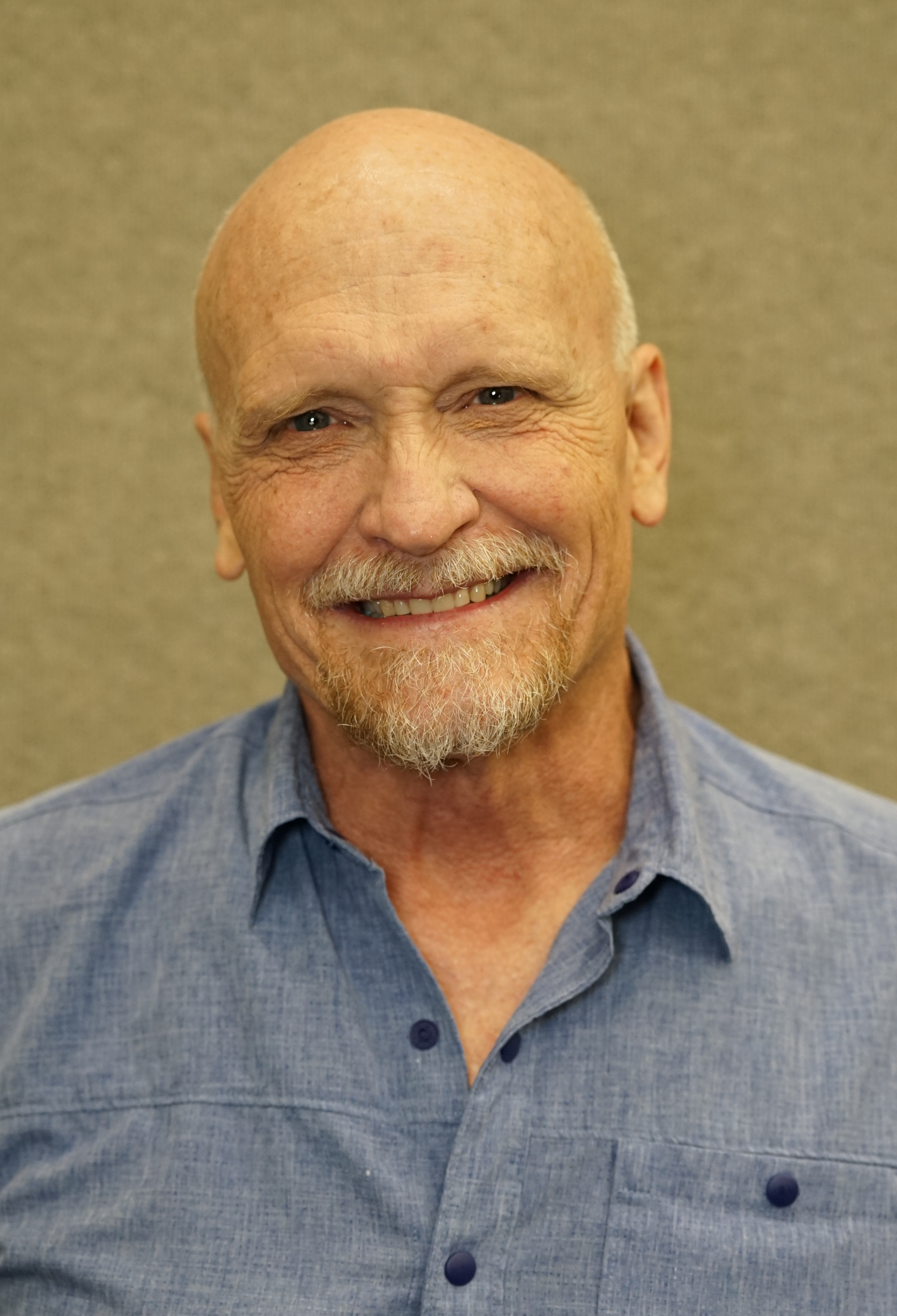
- Hendrix at Worldcon 2026
- Born: 1959 (age 66–67); Cincinnati, Ohio, U.S.
- Education: Xavier University (BS); University of California, Riverside (MA, PhD)
- Occupations: Author, professor
- Writing career
- Period: 1981–present
- Genre: Hard science fiction

Howard Vincent Hendrix (born 1959) is an American scholar and science fiction writer. He is the author of the novels Lightpaths and Standing Wave, Better Angels, Empty Cities of the Full Moon, The Labyrinth Key, and Spears of God. His early short stories are found in the ebook Mobius Highway.

== Early life, family and education ==
Howard Vincent Hendrix was born in 1959 in Cincinnati, Ohio, United States.

He graduated in 1980 with a Bachelor of Science degree in biology from Xavier University. He earned a Master's (1982) and a Ph.D (1987) in English literature from the University of California, Riverside.

== Career ==
Hendrix published his first short story, "Bad/Night/Vision", in 1983 in UC Riverside's art and literary journal, Mosaic. Since then, he has published over 30 short stories and poems as well as six science fiction novels, beginning with Lightpaths in September 1997 through Ace Books. His most recent novel is the 2006 Spears of God, published through Del Rey. His poem "Bumbershoot" won the 2010 Dwarf Stars Award from the Science Fiction & Fantasy Poetry Association.

He is an English professor at California State University, Fresno.

== Bibliography ==
=== Novels ===
- Lightpaths. 1997.
- Standing Wave. 1998.
- Better Angels (1999)
- Empty Cities of the Full Moon (2001)
- The Labyrinth Key (2004)
- Spears of God (2006)

== Awards ==
- Abraham L. Polonsky Award winner, 1983, for "Bad/Night/Vision"
- Writers of the Future Third Quarter First Place, 1986, for "In the Smoke"
- Nebula Award nominee (several times), Science Fiction Writers of America, 1986–1994
- Theodore Sturgeon Award nominee, 1994, for "At the Shadow of a Dream"
- Pushcart Prize nominee, 1989, for "The Art of Memory"

== International Pixel-Stained Technopeasant Day ==
Hendrix created a stir among science fiction and fantasy fans and authors with a LiveJournal posting on April 12, 2007. The purpose of the posting was to explain, in part, why he would not be seeking the presidency of the Science Fiction and Fantasy Writers of America after having served as its vice president. He criticized authors who offer their works for free on the internet, either as written works, or recorded as podcasts. His comments have drawn criticism from a number of other authors, such as Jo Walton, Michael A. Stackpole, John Scalzi, and David Wellington, and resulted in International Pixel-Stained Technopeasant Day.
