= Doomstones: Fire in the Mountains =

Doomstones: Fire in the Mountains is a 1990 role-playing adventure for Warhammer Fantasy Roleplay published by Games Workshop. It is the first of the four books in the Doomstone adventure series, continued with Doomstones: Blood in Darkness.

== Plot summary ==
Doomstones: Fire in the Mountains is an adventure in which the player characters search for a crystal of power in the mountain wilderness.

== Publication history ==
Fire in the Mountains was written by Basil Barrett with Brad Freeman and Graeme Davis, and was published by Flame Publications in 1990 as a 104-page book. The Halls of the Dwarven Kings was revised for Warhammer and republished as Fire in the Mountains.

== Reception ==
Anthony Ragan reviewed Doomstones 1: Fire in the Mountains in White Wolf #30 (Feb., 1992), rating it a 3 out of 5 and stated that "This is a good adventure [...] and is worth a WFRP gamemaster's consideration."

== Reviews ==
- Games Review (Volume 2, Issue 9 - Jun 1990)
