= Ha'penny (novel) =

2007 novel by Jo Walton

- Tor Books hardcover
- Author: Jo Walton
- Language: English
- Series: Small Change
- Genre: Alternate history novel
- Publisher: Tor Books
- Publication date: October 2, 2007
- Publication place: United States
- Media type: Print (Hardcover)
- Pages: 320 (hardcover edition)
- ISBN: 0-7653-1853-9 (hardcover edition)
- OCLC: 132681529
- Dewey Decimal: 823/.914 22
- LC Class: PR6073.A448 H37 2007
- Preceded by: Farthing
- Followed by: Half a Crown

Ha'penny is an alternative history novel written by Jo Walton and published by Tor Books. First published on October 2, 2007, it is the second novel of the Small Change series.

== Plot summary ==
The book is a mystery thriller set inside an alternative history in which the United Kingdom made peace with Adolf Hitler in 1941.

In 1949, Britain has slid into fascist dictatorship. When a bomb explodes in a London suburb, Scotland Yard Inspector Peter Carmichael is assigned to the case. He finds a web of conspiracy and a plot to murder both Britain's new Prime Minister and Adolf Hitler during the latter's Friendship visit to London. Carmichael's professional ethics became compromised during a previous case involving the aristocratic and political establishment, which may affect his ability to handle the case at hand.

Life is complicated for Viola Lark as well; she abandoned the upper-class environment of her family and lost touch with her five very different sisters (who are inspired by the real-life Mitford sisters) when she chose to become an actress. Viola is given the role of a lifetime and has hard decisions to make since she becomes caught up in family politics.

The first "Small Change" novel, Farthing, was released in August 2006 by Tor Books. A third novel in the series, Half a Crown, came out in September 2008, also from Tor.

== Awards and nominations ==
The Los Angeles Times named Ha'penny one of their ten Favorite Mystery Books of 2007.

The novel was nominated for a Lambda Literary Award for LGBT-themed fiction.

Ha'penny tied with Harry Turtledove's The Gladiator for the 2008 Prometheus Award.

== Publication history ==
- 2007, USA, Tor Books ISBN 0-7653-1853-9, Pub date 2 October 2007, Hardback
- 2008, USA, Tor Books ISBN 0-7653-5808-5, Pub date 1 July 2008, Mass Market Paperback
- 2010, Spain, La Factoria de la Ideas ISBN 978-84-92492-39-8, Pub date 1 October 2010, Paperback, as La Conspiración de Coltham (The Conspiracy of Coltham)
- 2015, France, Denoël ISBN 978-2207125144, Pub date 1 October 2015, Paperback, as Hamlet au paradis (Hamlet in paradise)

== See also ==
- Axis victory in World War II, regarding works of Nazi Germany/Axis/World War II alternate history
