= Among Others =

2011 novel by Jo Walton

- Dust jacket of first edition
- Author: Jo Walton
- Language: English
- Genre: Fantasy literature
- Publisher: Tor Books; Corsair (Constable & Robinson)
- Publication date: 18 January 2011
- Publication place: United States
- Media type: Print
- Pages: 302 (hardcover)
- Awards: Hugo Award for Best Novel; Nebula Award for Best Novel; British Fantasy Award
- ISBN: 978-0-7653-2153-4

Among Others is a 2011 fantasy novel written by Welsh-Canadian writer Jo Walton, published originally by Tor Books. It is published in the UK by Corsair (Constable & Robinson). It won the Nebula Award for Best Novel of 2011, the 2012 Hugo Award for Best Novel and the 2012 British Fantasy Award.

== Background ==
Among Others is the ninth novel published by Welsh-born author Jo Walton. It was written in 36 days in 2008, distributed between 29 February and 29 May. Walton describes the novel as semi-autobiographical, about the "coming-of-age experience of having books instead of people for friends and solace", which since the publication of the novel she has discovered to be more common among readers than she had expected. The author also shared the experience with her protagonist of being a Welsh student in an English boarding school and walking with a cane. As the main character is 15 in 1979, she would also have been born and grown up in the same area of Wales at roughly the same time. Walton also credits her own experiences growing up with a paranoid schizophrenic mother as giving her a "useful knowledge of evil" that informed the portrayal of her protagonist's mother in this novel. The author indicates the inspiration was the response she received to an article she posted in her online journal that year about the area of Wales in which she grew up and how she "thought [she] was living in a fantasy landscape, when actually [she] was living in a science fictional one". However, she notes that it is not actually autobiography, but rather "a mythologisation of part of my life. It's a fantasy novel, but it's drawing on autobiographical material."

Walton wrote the novel under the working title The Industrial Ruins of Elfland but altered it to the current title after a friend mentioned it to her as a good title for a novel due to its frequent use in biographical bibliographies – an author had written specific works "among others". This struck her as an apt description of the novel she was working on at the time. The novel was released in North America first, under the Tor imprint, in January 2011 before being released in the UK in October 2012 by Corsair.

== Plot ==
The novel is presented as the diary of Morgana, a 15-year-old Welsh science fiction and fantasy fan, in 1979 and 1980. She and her twin sister Morwenna, both frequently using the nicknames "Mor" or "Mori", grew up playing and occasionally working magic with beings they call faeries in the hills of Wales. Several months before the start of the novel, their mother, who is described as both insane and a witch, attempts to gain more power to take over the world. The sisters are able to stop her, but in the process their mother causes them to be struck by a car, killing Morwenna and disabling one of Morgana's legs. Morgana begins mostly using Morwenna's name, though still typically going by Mori.

As her mother is insane and her grandfather (with whom she previously lived) has had a stroke and is in a care facility, she has run away from her home and been sent to western England to live with her father and his three half-sisters, none of whom she has ever seen. Bereft of her sister, her joy in running, and her beloved Welsh countryside, Mori must reconcile to her new life as a disabled, friendless outsider. She feels that she can do this as long as she has books to read, and her one connection to her father is the love of books they share.

Her paternal family send her to a nearby girls' boarding school, which she finds unmagical and very uncongenial. She has few friends and considerable free time because she can do her schoolwork quickly and because her injury prevents her from participating in sports. She spends most of her time reading books provided by her father (also a science fiction fan), the school library, the local public library, and interlibrary loan. Throughout her diary she records her and other characters' reactions to these books with as much interest as any other events of her life. At one point she casts a spell to locate friends who can unite with her on a common purpose and then is invited to join a science fiction/fantasy readers' club at the library. She makes a few connections there and eventually a boyfriend who not only shares her interested in books but in magic, although he can barely see the fairies and cannot himself work spells.

Magic remains a persistent feature in Mori's life. Shortly after her arrival at the school, Mori's mother begins sending her letters and family photographs in which Mori's image is burned out and launching magical attacks to control her daughter. Mori tries to work with the fairies near her school but finds she must return to her home in Wales to truly connect and do her own protective magic. She is offered the opportunity to join her dead sister in becoming a fairy herself, but to do so must also die. She chooses instead to embrace her new life and whatever the future might hold. She confronts her mother in a final magical conflict, and, victorious, returns to her new family and her boyfriend.

== Genre and themes ==
Among Others combines the features of a fantasy novel and a coming of age story. It is an epistolary novel, presented as a series of diary entries of a teenage girl which detail the concerns of her life in chronological order, ranging from such mundane concerns as her grade in math and the experience of buying a first bra to performing ritual magic to allow the dead to pass into the other life. The book takes a careful balance between confirming and denying that Mori's perceptions of magic and fairies is real, although a slightly stronger confirmation comes when Mori's boyfriend is also able to see the fairies. Walton has affirmed that it was her intention that the magic within the novel be real, and the theme of unreliable narration was not an intentional one although it has been widely picked up by readers.

In addition to unintended themes of reliable narration and whether the magic Mori perceives is wish-fulfillment, the novel explicitly explores the question of moral responsibility in doing magic. As the novel progresses, Mori comes to feel that the rippling impact of magic on others and its ability to deprive them of free will is unacceptable, and she pledges to use magic only for protection. The book also explores the ability of books to provide hope in times of grief and darkness.

As the title suggests, the novel is also focused on making one's own way in a world in which one feels outside. "Otherness" is core to the story. In her English boarding school, Mori is differentiated from her peers on a number of axes: she is Welsh, she is disabled, she is the only student in her school depicted as reading for pleasure (often alone with the librarian), and she is aside from her sister and mother the only person depicted as having the ability to see and communicate with fairies, at least until she introduces her boyfriend Wim to the skill.

== Reception ==
Among Others was critically very well received. In 2012, The Guardian described the book as "one of only a handful of novels ever to get such a grand-slam shortlisting for all the major science fiction literary prizes".

Ursula K. Le Guin, in her review for The Guardian, called the book "a funny, thoughtful, acute and absorbing story all the way through". Similarly, Elizabeth Bear, in her review for tor.com, stated that "The voice is sublime; the characters nuanced ... In any case, I think this is Walton's best book to date."

Conversely, in her review for The Washington Post, Elizabeth Hand wrote that "More than anything else, Among Others is a love letter to the literature of the fantastic and to SF fandom. This is problematic as well as charming, because nothing much happens in the novel."

Awards and honors
Year	Award	Category	Result	Reference
2011	Nebula Award	Best Novel	Won	
2012	British Fantasy Award	Best Fantasy Novel	Won	
2012	Hugo Award	Best Novel	Won	
2012	Locus Award	Best Fantasy Novel	Finalist	
2012	Mythopoeic Award	Adult Literature	Finalist	
2012	World Fantasy Awards	Novel	Finalist	
2014	Kurd Laßwitz Award	Foreign Novel	Won	
2015	Seiun Award	Best Translated Novel	Finalist	
