= Lifelode =

2009 novel by Jo Walton

- First edition
- Author: Jo Walton
- Language: English
- Publisher: NESFA Press
- Publication date: 2009

Lifelode is a 2009 fantasy novel by Jo Walton, published by NESFA Press, with an introduction by Sharyn November.

== Setting ==
In a land where the rules governing thought, magic, and even the flow of time are dependent on how far east or west one is, Taveth (who has the power to see present, past, and future all superimposed) is the housekeeper at Applekirk Manor in the Marches, just far east enough for small magic to work.

== Reception ==
Lifelode won the 2010 Mythopoeic Fantasy Award for Adult Literature, and was included on the "honor list" for the 2009 James Tiptree Jr. Award.

Paul Kincaid described it as "ingenious" and "a huge novel on a small scale", and compared its portrayal of everyday life continuing even in the presence of "something amazing" to W. H. Auden's Musée des Beaux Arts.
