= Half a Crown (novel) =

2008 novel by Jo Walton

- Hardcover edition
- Author: Jo Walton
- Language: English
- Series: Small Change
- Genre: Alternate history novel
- Publisher: Tor Books
- Publication date: September 30, 2008
- Publication place: United States
- Media type: Print (Hardcover)
- Pages: 320
- ISBN: 978-0-7653-1621-9
- OCLC: 213301014
- Dewey Decimal: 823/.914 22
- LC Class: PR6073.A448 H34 2008
- Preceded by: Ha'penny

Half a Crown is an alternate history novel written by Jo Walton published by Tor Books. It was first published on September 30, 2008. The first "Small Change" novel, Farthing, was released in August 2006. The second novel in the trilogy, Ha'penny, was released in October 2007.

== Plot summary ==
The book is a thriller set in an alternate history in which the United Kingdom made peace with Adolf Hitler, and the United States did not become involved in World War II. The British government has become fascist and authoritarian.

Peter Carmichael, formerly a police inspector at Scotland Yard, is head of the secret police, called "The Watch". He must deal with political intrigue by those jealous of his position and must safeguard his teenage ward while he keeps secret his illicit activities helping Jews and dissidents who wish to flee the country.

== Reception ==
Publishers Weekly was mixed in its review by commenting, "Walton's understated prose and deft characterizations elevate this above similar works such as Fatherland and SS-GB. Some readers, though, may feel let down by an optimistic ending that jars with the series' overall downbeat tone".

== Awards and nominations ==
Half a Crown was a finalist for the 2009 Prometheus Award.

== Publication history ==
- 2008, USA, Tor Books ISBN 978-0-7653-1621-9 Pub date 30 September 2008, Hardback

== See also ==
- Axis victory in World War II, regarding works of Nazi Germany/Axis/World War II alternate history
