= The Feathered Priests =

Tabletop role-playing game adventure

- Writers: Simon Forrest, Basil Barrett
- Publishers: Integrated Games
- Publication: 1986
- Genres: Role-playing

The Feathered Priests is an adventure published by Integrated Games in 1986 for any role-playing game system.

== Plot summary ==
The Feathered Priests is a role-playing scenario and gamemaster's aid written for any role-playing game system — conversion rules for Dungeons & Dragons, Advanced Dungeons & Dragons, and RuneQuest are included. The setting is the Endless Plains, where the players must recover a set of tarot-like cards.

== Publication history ==
Integrated Games planned a five-part fantasy role-playing adventure series called The Complete Dungeon Master Series. Between 1984 and 1986, Simon Forrest and Basil Barrett wrote four adventures, the last in 1986 being The Feathered Priests. This boxed set, with art by Judith Hickling, Huggam, and Fergus Hickling, contains a 16-page book, an 8-page pamphlet, a large two-color map, six cardstock sheets, a cardstock screen, and two sheets of play aids.

The Feathered Priests had been preceded by The Halls of the Dwarven Kings (1984), The Lost Shrine of Kasar-Khan (1985), and The Watchers of the Sacred Flame (1986). Integrated Games went out of business before a planned fifth adventure, Deep Water, Shallow Graves, was published.

In 1992, Flame Publications, an imprint of Games Workshop, bought the rights to The Complete Dungeon Master Series, and Simon Forrest, Brad Freeman and Graeme Davis revised all four adventures to conform to the Warhammer Fantasy Roleplay rules, releasing them as the Doomstone Campaign Book Series. The Feathered Priests was retitled Dwarf Wars.

== Reception ==
In the July 1987 edition of White Dwarf #91, Paul Cockburn called this adventure "a cracker," although he admitted that this "echoes the other plots of the series with its race against time, find the clues [...] and a big reward in the offing." He concluded with a strong recommendation, saying, "This is possibly the best adventure play aid for AD&D since Ravenloft, with which it shares certain similarities in terms of atmosphere and setting. I'll be running it more than once."

== Other reviews ==
- Concepts Issue 2 (April 1988, p.28)
