= Lent (novel) =

2019 fantasy novel by Jo Walton

- First edition cover
- Author: Jo Walton
- Language: English
- Genre: Historical fantasy
- Publisher: Tor Books
- Publication date: 28 May 2019
- Publication place: United States
- Media type: Print
- Pages: 384 (hardcover)
- ISBN: 978-0-7653-7906-1

Lent is a 2019 fantasy novel by Jo Walton about Girolamo Savonarola. It was first published by Tor Books, and was nominated for the Mythopoeic Fantasy Award.

== Synopsis ==
In Renaissance Florence, Girolamo Savonarola is a Dominican friar with the gift of prophecy and the ability to see and banish demons. After Lorenzo di Medici dies in 1492, Girolamo gradually becomes more and more involved in politics, eventually culminating in his execution in 1498, and subsequent damnation to Hell.

He then finds himself in 1492 Florence again, and begins trying to change history.

== Reception ==
In the Los Angeles Times, Cory Doctorow called it a "beautifully rendered retelling" of Savonarola's life, commending the "ringing verisimilitude of well-researched, real historical personages" who appeared in the novel, and noting that Walton portrays the basic concept of repeating historical events with "a new, rich ambiguity". At National Public Radio, Amal el-Mohtar praised Walton's application of "mythographical playfulness" to Christian theology, her presentation of Savonarola as "a man wrestling with pride and its just causes", her depiction of Florence as a setting, and the book's overall narrative structure, but ultimately faulted the ending as "rushed" and "impatient". In Locus, conversely, Gary K. Wolfe found the ending to "ingeniously satisf(y) both the terms of its 15th-century Florentine worldview and the SF-like machinery that makes it work."

James Nicoll noted that the first half of the book can be considered "fairly straightforward historical fantasy: Italian history as it is known, but seasoned with demons and miracles", and lauded Walton's prose as "good to superlative". The Globe and Mail proposed that it may bring Walton to the attention of "an even wider readership, crossing, as it does, the proverbial Arno into literary fiction territory." The Winnipeg Free Press described it as "slow-moving but ultimately interesting", and – albeit "unique and thoughtful" – "(n)ot as revolutionary as Walton's other works."

Lent was nominated for the 2020 Mythopoeic Fantasy Award for Adult Literature.
