= An Informal History of the Hugos =

2018 non-fiction book about the Hugo awards

- First edition cover
- Author: Jo Walton
- Language: English
- Subject: Science fiction, fantasy
- Publisher: Tor Books
- Publication date: 7 August 2018
- Publication place: United States
- Media type: Print
- Pages: 576 (hardcover)
- ISBN: 978-0-7653-7908-5

An Informal History of the Hugos (subtitled A Personal Look Back at the Hugo Awards, 1953–2000) is a 2018 reference work on science fiction and fantasy written by Jo Walton. In it, she asks if the nominees for the Hugo Award for Best Novel were indeed the best five books of the year, using as reference shortlists from other awards in the genre. After looking at the first 48 years of the award and presenting essays on select nominees, Walton concludes that the Hugo has a 69% success rate. The book was well-received and was itself nominated for a Hugo Award in 2019.

The chapters of the book initially appeared as articles on the magazine Tor.com from 2010 to 2011. These were written a year before Walton herself won the Hugo Award for Best Novel (for Among Others, in 2012). The Tor.com posts drew frequent discussion, with comments from editors Gardner Dozois, David G. Hartwell and Rich Horton that responded to and sometimes disagreed with Walton's analyses. These were included as part of the book.

== Background ==
The impetus for the book came from the tie for the 2010 Hugo Award for Best Novel, when China Miéville and Paolo Bacigalupi both won the award. This was only the third time in 57 years that such a tie had happened, leading to a discussion on the fanzine File 770 about the previous two occasions:

Year	Ties for the Best Novel Hugo		Ref.
1966	Dune by Frank Herbert	This Immortal by Roger Zelazny	
1993	Doomsday Book by Connie Willis	A Fire Upon the Deep by Vernor Vinge	
2010	The City & the City by China Miéville	The Windup Girl by Paolo Bacigalupi	

Mike Glyer opined in an editorial that history had broken both prior ties, in favor of Connie Willis and Frank Herbert. In reply, Walton said she was "absolutely astonished" at the suggestion.

Over the year following Glyer's post, Walton wrote a series of 49 articles on Tor.com titled Revisiting the Hugos (1953–2000). She argued in favor of the ties in 1966 and 1993, and analyzed nominees in a manner inspired by a 1990 Worldcon panel. (Note: The 1990 panel, titled "This Book Should Have Been Nominated", prompted an earlier article by Walton in 2009: Is the right book winning the Hugo?. In that post, she concluded that at least in 1990, the right book did win – Dan Simmons' Hyperion. This was later expanded into her Revisiting the Hugos entry on 1990.) Walton stopped at the year 2000, when she began to enter award eligibility herself. (Note: Walton was a finalist for the 2001 and 2002 John W. Campbell Award for Best New Writer (presented along with the Hugos), winning the second time. In 2012, a year after her Revisiting the Hugos series, she won the Hugo Award for Best Novel, for Among Others.) Her posts were later collected into book form and published in 2018.

== Synopsis ==
Walton states in the introduction that her goal is to analyze whether the Hugo nominees were the best five books of the year, and to examine how well they have stood the test of time. Her focus is on novels, with occasional comments on other categories, including the Campbell nominees. The book contains a chapter for each year from 1953 to 2000.

For each year, Walton discusses the Hugo shortlist in context with other titles that might have been nominated. She considers finalists from the following awards for science fiction and fantasy:

Award	Years active
International Fantasy Award	1951 – 1957
Hugo Award	1953 – present
Nebula Award	1966 – present
Locus Award	1971 – present
Mythopoeic Fantasy Award	1971 – present
John W. Campbell Memorial Award	1973 – present
World Fantasy Award	1975 – present
Prometheus Award	1979 – present
Philip K. Dick Award	1982 – present
James Tiptree Award	1991 – present

After assessing the shortlist, she presents an essay about one book from each year. This is sometimes on the Hugo winner, but often about a different book Walton prefers. Since the Tor.com articles drew frequent discussion, sometimes garnering over 100 comments, the book contains a curated selection of the responses. It includes entries from Gardner Dozois, David G. Hartwell and Rich Horton that expand on the state of short fiction in each year.

In the conclusion, Walton notes that the Hugos got it right in twenty-nine out of forty-two years, or 69% of the time, for novels, but 99% for novellas.

== Reception ==
Publishers Weekly called the book "an essential guide to 20th-century science fiction literature". PW remarked on Walton's substantial essays on individual books, a comment echoed by Gary K. Wolfe in his review for Locus magazine. PW highlighted Walton's essay on Ursula K. Le Guin's The Lathe of Heaven, while Wolfe noted her entries on Robert Heinlein's Have Space Suit—Will Travel, and Thomas M. Disch's On Wings of Song. Wolfe observed that the book looked at not just the nominees, but also at works that may have been overlooked for the Hugos, which he described as not an easy task.

Barnes & Noble's Jeff Somers commented on the personal nature of Walton's columns. He called the book "a singular, essential critical appreciation" for the Hugo nominees, and said that although they were pre-selected as some of the best SF ever written, "Walton doesn't always agree, and is more than ready to tell you why". Reviewers noted Walton's openness about her personal biases: for instance, she "adores much of Robert Heinlein and C. J. Cherryh", but dislikes Philip K. Dick and William Gibson. The candidness of Walton's opinions was praised by Publishers Weekly and Tor.com's Lee Mandelo. Mandelo called her approach refreshing, and remarked that "objectivity is more fantastical than dragons".

Reviewers also noted the extensive nature of contributions from Gardner Dozois, David G. Hartwell and Rich Horton. Wolfe wrote: "the book [is] virtually a collaboration... a good part of the fun of reading these columns all in one place is arguing with [Walton's] judgments, as her respondents often do with grace and good humor". Mandelo's review highlighted the transformation from conversational blog posts to a static book, and noted the uniqueness of the cross-platform approach, saying that it made for "a dragonfly-in-amber effect on reading".

An Informal History of the Hugos was a finalist for the 2019 Hugo Award for Best Related Work, and the 2019 Locus Award for Best Non-Fiction.
