= Celts Campaign Sourcebook =

Accessory for Dungeons & Dragons

- Genre: Role-playing games
- Publisher: TSR
- Publication date: 1992

Celts Campaign Sourcebook is an accessory for the 2nd edition of the Advanced Dungeons & Dragons fantasy role-playing game, published in 1992. The manual was published by TSR and written by Graeme Davis.

== Contents ==
Celts Campaign Sourcebook is a guide to Celtic history and mythology with character class variants, Celtic monsters, a timeline, and a foldout map covering the British Isles to the Black Sea.

== Publication history ==
The manual was published by TSR and written by Graeme Davis.

== Reception ==
Berin Kinsman reviewed the book in a 1993 issue of White Wolf Magazine. He noted that, as a reference, other sources might be more useful, but "[a]s an AD&D supplement, this makes a fair showing". He rated it overall at a 3 out of a possible 5.
