= The Philosopher Kings (novel) =

2015 novel by Jo Walton

- Hardcover edition
- Author: Jo Walton
- Language: English
- Series: Thessaly
- Genre: Fantasy
- Publisher: Tor Books
- Publication date: June 2015
- Publication place: United States
- Pages: 345 (hardcover)
- ISBN: 978-0-7653-3267-7
- Preceded by: The Just City
- Followed by: Necessity

The Philosopher Kings is a fantasy/science fiction novel by the Welsh-Canadian author Jo Walton, published by Tor Books in June 2015. It is the second book of the Thessaly trilogy, and the sequel to The Just City, which was published a mere six months previously, and followed by Necessity, which was published in 2016.

== Synopsis ==
The Philosopher Kings is set fifteen years after the events described in The Just City. The City, which was created by the time-traveling goddess Athena on the island of Thera prior to its Iron Age volcanic destruction, and then populated by people from all ages of human history and organized on the principles of Plato's Republic, has now split into five feuding cities, while a further, sixth, faction has sailed away and remains lost.

The god Apollo, who had chosen to live as a human in the original city, and, having married, is now the father of several children, is struck by a tragic loss, which causes him to become consumed with grief and a need for revenge. Though, being Apollo, he deals with these feelings rationally, his precocious teenage daughter Arete understands that these novel experiences (for a god) are leaving him unbalanced.

With Arete and several of his sons, Apollo sets out by ship across the Aegean, in the company of sailors, soldiers and scholars, among them the by now 99 years old Florentine renaissance philosopher Marsilio Ficino. After a long voyage of exploration they discover the sixth, lost group from the City, which has been preaching Christianity to Iron Age Greeks. Apollo's confrontation with a longtime rival lets him finally start the healing process. Afterwards he turns toward peacemaking, but although he succeeds in his goals, the course of history seems by then to have been irrevocably changed by the anachronistic introduction of Christianity. It takes a surprising amount of divine power to put everything right again.

== Reception ==
Amal El-Mohtar, at NPR, who was very impressed with Walton's The Just City, was at first "outraged" when it turned out Walton jumped forward fifteen years in time with The Philosopher Kings. Although that was one of the reasons she liked this sequel less than The Just City, she soon lost herself again in the story, and praised Walton for her "easy conversational prose". Publishers Weekly wrote that Walton succeeded well in showing the impracticality of Plato's ideas, but also thought that her "use of god-level powers, including a book-ending deus ex machina, strips the book of tension."

Kirkus Reviews, which was less positive about The Just City, thought The Philosopher Kings actually a much better book. Walton was, according to Kirkus, in this novel "more audacious ..., launching into her own territory; the plotting and characterization are richer in what begins as a fantasy and then, just at the end, abruptly and intriguingly veers into science fiction." Though Kirkus thinks his rival Kebes remains a one-dimensional villain, grief has "seriously chipped away" at the hubris which characterized Apollo in The Just City.
