= Death's Dark Shadow =

Death's Dark Shadow is a 1991 role-playing adventure for Warhammer Fantasy Roleplay published by Games Workshop.

== Plot summary ==
Death's Dark Shadow is an adventure in which the trading town Kreuzhofen serves as a base for the player characters.

== Reception ==
Anthony Ragan reviewed Death's Dark Shadow in White Wolf #30 (Feb., 1992), rating it a 3 out of 5 and stated that "it makes a worthy addition to any WFRP referee's collection."

== Reviews ==
- Warpstone (Issue 14 - Summer 2000)
- Warpstone (Issue 17 - Autumn 2001)
- Strike to Stun (Issue 2 - Jan 2002)
- Backstab #30
