= The Watchers of the Sacred Flame =

Role-playing games supplement

- Illustrators: Judith Hickling
- Writers: Simon Forrest, Basil Barrett
- Publishers: Integrated Games
- Publication: 1986
- Genres: Role-playing

The Watchers of the Sacred Flame is an adventure published by Integrated Games in 1986 for any role-playing game system.

== Plot summary ==
The Watchers of the Sacred Flame is an adventure in which the player characters pursue an artefact of great power. It is designed to be used with any role-playing system; suggestions for converting statistics to systems similar to Advanced Dungeons & Dragons and RuneQuest are included.

== Publication history ==
Integrated Games planned a five-part fantasy role-playing adventure series called The Complete Dungeon Master Series. Between 1984 and 1987, Simon Forrest and Basil Barrett wrote four adventures, the third in 1986 being The Watchers of the Sacred Flame. The boxed set contained a 32-page book, two 12-page books, a cardstock screen, 23 cardstock map sheets, and five player handout screens, with artwork by Judith Hickling.

This scenario is the sequel to The Halls of the Dwarven Kings and The Lost Shrine of Kasar-Khan, and the precursor to The Feathered Priests.

In 1992, Flame Publications, an imprint of Games Workshop, bought the rights to The Complete Dungeon Master Series, and Simon Forrest, Brad Freeman and Graeme Davis revised all four adventures to conform to the Warhammer Fantasy Roleplay rules, releasing them as the Doomstone Campaign Book Series. The Watchers of the Sacred Flame was retitled Death Rock.

== Reception ==
In the February 1987 edition of White Dwarf (Issue #86), Paul Cockburn thought the contents were "an impressive package with which to run the scenario," but thought it was a pity that "all the careful background and history is going to remain hidden from the players, while they chase after the artefact and the bad guys." Cockburn also thought that some of the player's handouts, meant to help the players, would have the opposite effect. He concluded with a recommendation, saying "The adventure has a lot going for it. There are many excellent encounters, both passive and deadly."

In the February 1987 edition of Adventurer (Issue 7), David Michaels was impressed by "the quantity of goodies you get when you open the box," and thought the adventure was "rather reminiscent of the best of the Judges Guild scenarios, but with very nice illustrations and presentation."

== Other reviews ==
- Free INT Issue 7 (May 1994, p.24, in German)
