= Better Angels (novel) =

1999 novel by Howard V. Hendrix

- Author: Howard V. Hendrix
- Cover artist: Victor Stabin
- Language: English
- Series: Tetragrammaton Series
- Genre: Science fiction novel
- Publisher: Penguin Putnam Inc.
- Publication date: October 15, 1999
- Publication place: United States of America
- Media type: Print (Hardcover, Paperback)
- Pages: 373 (1st edition, hardback)
- ISBN: 0-441-00652-3 (1st edition, hardback)
- OCLC: 41419615
- Dewey Decimal: 813/.54 21
- LC Class: PS3558.E49526 B4 1999
- Followed by: Lightpath

Better Angels is a science fiction novel by Howard V. Hendrix first published in 1999.

Better Angels is a prequel to Hendrix's earlier novels Lightpath and Standing Wave, filling in history about how the characters in those novels came to be who they are.

== Title ==
In the novel, "Better angels" is a phrase used by agents of the organization Tetragrammatron to describe what they hope to make humanity into. Tetragrammatron is concerned with ensuring humanity's survival by creating a machine/human transcendences, turning humans into "better angels". The phrase itself comes from the closing of Abraham Lincoln's first inaugural address, in which he said that, despite the rising conflict in the United States, the shared history of Americans would "yet swell the chorus of the Union, when again touched, as surely they will be, by the better angels of our nature."

== Release details ==
- 1999, United States of America, Penguin Putnam Inc. ISBN 0-441-00652-3, Pub date 15 October 1999, Hardback
- 2000, United States of America, Penguin Putnam Inc. ISBN 0-441-00767-8, Pub date 7 November 2000, Paperback

== Sources and external links ==
- Official page
- Aylott, Chris (October 21, 1999). "'Better Angels' Blends Phil K. Dick, Heinlein". Archived from the original on August 18, 2000.
