= Doomstones: Blood in Darkness =

Doomstones: Blood in Darkness is a 1990 role-playing adventure for Warhammer Fantasy Roleplay published by Games Workshop. It is the second of the four books in the Doomstone adventure series, following Doomstones: Fire in the Mountains and continued with Doomstones: Death Rock.

== Plot summary ==
Doomstones: Blood in Darkness is an adventure in which the player characters try to find the second crystal of power by searching an ancient dwarven shrine.

== Publication history ==
Blood in Darkness was written by Simon Forrest with Brad Freeman and Graeme Davis, and was published by Flame Publications in 1990 as an 80-page book. The Lost Shrine of Kasar-Khan was revised for Warhammer and republished as Blood in Darkness.

== Reception ==
Anthony Ragan reviewed Doomstones 2: Blood in Darkness in White Wolf #30 (Feb., 1992), rating it a 3 out of 5 and stated that "Blood in Darkness is a good WFRP adventure with the potential for quite a lot of fun."

== Reviews ==
- Games Review (Volume 2, Issue 9 - Jun 1990)
