= Blood and Honor (novel) =

Fantasy novel by Graeme Davis

- Cover of the first edition
- Language: English
- Genre: Fantasy novel
- Published: 2006
- Publication place: United States
- Media type: Print (Paperback)
- ISBN: 0-7869-4069-7

Blood and Honor is a fantasy novel by Graeme Davis, set in the world of Eberron, and based on the Dungeons & Dragons role-playing game. It is the fourth novel in "The War-Torn" series. It was published in paperback in September 2006.

== Plot summary ==
Blood and Honor is a novel in which a disgraced exile aims to save a noble house in the nation of Karrnath.

== Reception ==
Pat Ferrara of mania.com comments: "Blood and Honor is the first novel by British native Graeme Davis. D&D fans have no fear though, Davis has been writing for Game Workshop's White Dwarf magazine since 1982, has written over 30 books and 100 articles for Dungeons & Dragons and other roleplaying games, and has been intimately involved in the design of more than 15 computer and video games."
