= Warhammer Companion =

Warhammer Companion is a 1990 role-playing supplement for Warhammer Fantasy Roleplay published by Games Workshop.

== Plot summary ==
Warhammer Companion is a supplement in which new rules, adventure scenarios, spells and magic items are presented, along with material that previously appeared in White Dwarf.

== Reception ==
Anthony Ragan reviewed Warhammer Companion in White Wolf #28 (Aug./Sept., 1991), rating it a 4 out of 5 and stated that "This is a useful work, and a worthy purchase for any Warhammer devotee."

== Reviews ==
- Casus Belli #69
