= Tooth and Claw (novel) =

2003 novel by Jo Walton

- Tor Books hardcover
- Author: Jo Walton
- Language: English
- Genre: Fantasy
- Publisher: Tor Books
- Publication date: November 1, 2003 (1st edition)
- Publication place: United States
- Media type: Print (Hardcover)
- Pages: 256 (hardcover, 1st edition)
- ISBN: 0-7653-0264-0 (hardcover, 1st edition)
- OCLC: 52478573
- Dewey Decimal: 823/.92 21
- LC Class: PR6073.A448 T66 2003

Tooth and Claw is a fantasy novel by Welsh-Canadian writer Jo Walton, published by Tor Books on November 1, 2003. It won the World Fantasy Award for Best Novel in 2004.

== Plot summary ==
The book's plot is similar to that of a Victorian romance (specifically, Anthony Trollope's novel Framley Parsonage), with the obvious difference that the protagonists are not human beings but dragons. The novel begins with the death of Bon Agornin, the patriarch of a middle-to-high-class family of five direct descendants, including Penn, Haner, Selendra, Berend, and Avan Agornin, along with more extended family, who have gathered around both to mourn his passing and to collect their inheritance.

Several main conflicts are introduced early on that span most of the book, starting with a dying confession Bon makes to Penn, who, as a priest, absolves him of his wrongdoing despite the issues it would raise for his church. Next, Daverak, a son-in-law of Bon, takes more than what was agreed upon in the distribution of Bon Agornin's wealth, which is complicated by Penn having taken Bon's confession and therefore being unable to share said wealth distribution agreement without also sharing his confession, as well as the fact that part of the distribution of wealth includes cannibalizing Bon's remains for health and strength, which most of the rest of the family feels they need more. Haner and Selendra, very close sisters, are forced to live in different places due to financial and social complications, with Haner leaving to live with Daverak, and Selendra with Penn. Finally, a priest working with Penn by the name of Frelt approaches Selendra and asks to marry her; she refuses, as she dislikes him, but nonetheless his actions cause her scales to turn pink, indicating that she's a bride soon to be married, which would cause numerous social complications; however, their servant makes a tea that turns her scales back to normal, though potentially at the cost of her never turning pink again.

The main portion of the story afterward is split between Avan as he files a court case to sue Daverak for theft of the Agornin family inheritance; Daverak as he prepares a counter case against Avan; Selendra as she pursues a potentially romantic relationship with Sher Benandi; Haner as she tries to keep herself safe and well-respected while navigating the Victorian-style social class system and secretly helping in an abolitionist movement; and Penn as he comes to terms with both Bon's confession and with his own shaken religious beliefs.

The story ends with Selendra turning pink and happily marrying Sher; Avan winning the court case against Daverak, mostly because Sher fights Daverak to death, with Daverak's death afterward allowing the Agornin family to take both his wealth and to devour him; Haner eventually meeting back up with Selendra and talking to her about both of their upcoming marriages; and Penn largely unaffected as he never had to officially disclose Bon's confession to the court or to anyone else outside of it.

== Themes ==
In interviews, Jo Walton said that her primary inspiration for writing Tooth and Claw was Anthony Trollope, and in general the Victorian era's treatment and beliefs about women. The main points she brought up to highlight the way women were treated were how Trollope believed that women could not earn their own living and could only fall in love once.

Reviewers have noted that social class and class privilege is a theme present throughout Tooth and Claw, generally expressed through the way the dragons cannibalize each other for size, strength and power. The primary determiner for who is eaten is based on who is the lowest, be it physically or in social standing.
