= The King's Peace (novel) =

2000 novel by Jo Walton

- Tor Books hardcover
- Author: Jo Walton
- Cover artist: Julie Bell
- Language: English
- Series: Sulien
- Genre: Fantasy
- Publisher: Tor Books
- Publication date: October 2000 (1st edition)
- Publication place: United States
- Media type: Print (Hardback & Paperback)
- Pages: 416 (hardcover, 1st edition)
- ISBN: 0-312-87229-1 (hardcover, 1st edition)
- OCLC: 44039865
- Dewey Decimal: 823/.92 21
- LC Class: PR6073.A448 K56 2000
- Preceded by: The Prize in the Game
- Followed by: The King's Name

The King's Peace is a fantasy novel by Welsh-Canadian writer Jo Walton, published by Tor Books in October 2000. The first of Walton's published novels, it is also the first of three "Sulien" novels. It was followed in 2001 by a sequel, The King's Name, and in 2002 by a prequel, The Prize in the Game. The novels are a reinterpretation of the story of King Arthur.

== Plot summary ==
Sulien ap Gwien, a woman warrior and daughter of the King of a small part of the island of Tir Tanagiri, is brutally raped by six invading Jarnsmen and her brother is murdered. While travelling to the capital to request help from Urdo, the High King, she happens upon a battle between some more Jarnsmen and some of the King's soldiers. Sulien proves her skill in battle and, drawn in part by the young King's leadership and charisma, she enlists in the cavalry. The novel follows her journey up the ranks, the battles against the invading Jarnsmen and Isarnagans, and Urdo's efforts to unite the many kingdoms of Tir Tanagiri and restore peace and law to the land.
