= Jo Walton =

Canadian writer and poet (born 1964)

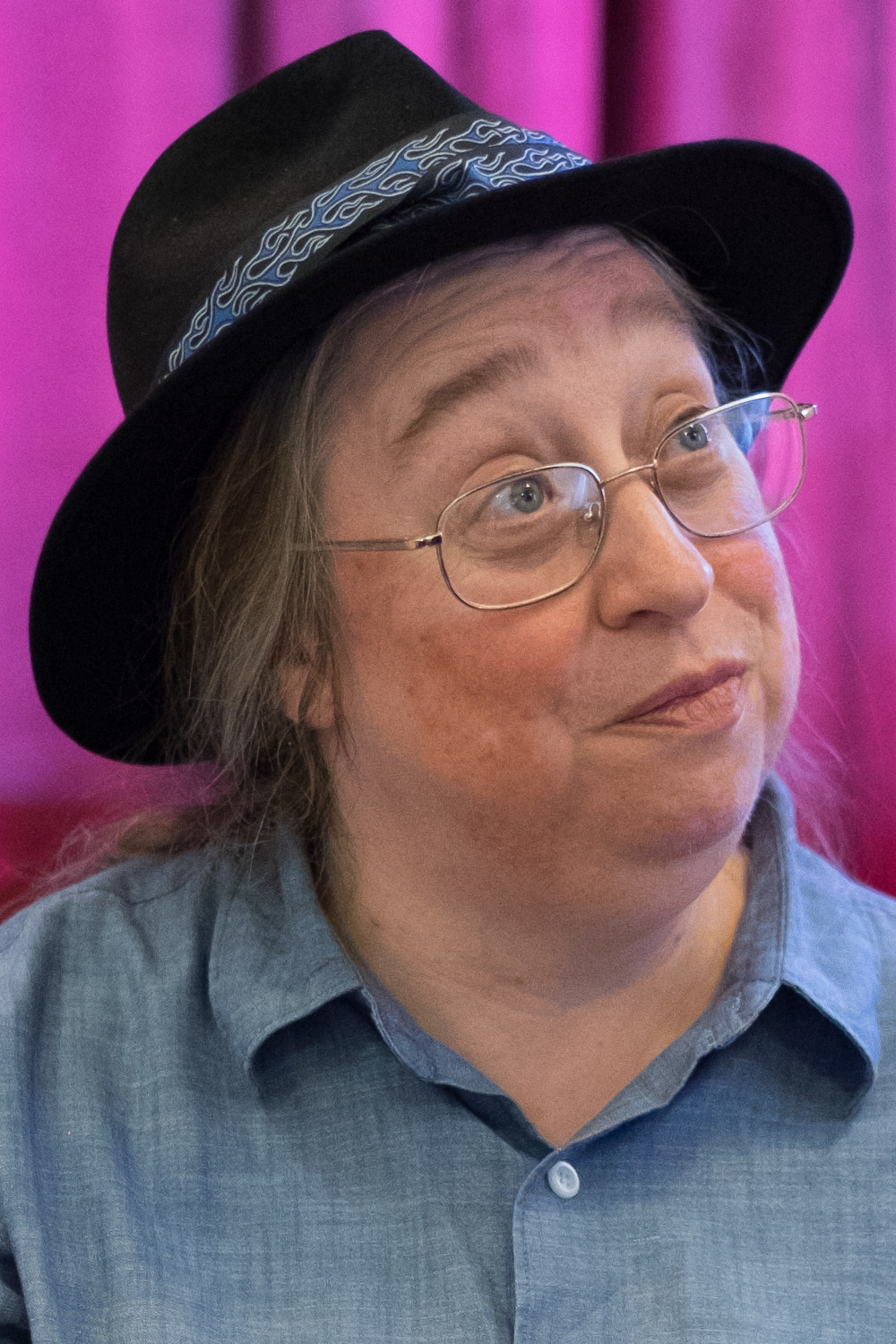
- Jo Walton in 2014
- Born: 1964 (age 61–62); Aberdare, Wales, UK
- Citizenship: Canadian
- Occupation: Writer
- Spouse: Emmet A. O'Brien
- Children: 1
- Writing career
- Genres: Fantasy, science fiction, alternate history

Jo Walton (born 1964) is a Welsh-Canadian fantasy and science fiction writer and poet. She is best known for the fantasy novel Among Others, which won the Hugo and Nebula Awards in 2012, and Tooth and Claw, a Victorian-era novel with dragons which won the World Fantasy Award in 2004. Other works by Walton include the Small Change series, in which she blends alternate history with the cozy mystery genre, comprising Farthing, Ha'penny and Half a Crown. Her fantasy novel Lifelode won the 2010 Mythopoeic Award, and her alternate history My Real Children received the 2015 Tiptree Award.

Walton is also known for her non-fiction, including book reviews and SF commentary for Tor Books at Reactor (magazine). A collection of her articles were published in What Makes This Book So Great (2014), which won the Locus Award for Best Non-Fiction.

Walton is credited with coining the term the Tiffany Problem, a dilemma in creating historical fiction, in 2019.

== Background ==
Walton was born in 1964 in Aberdare, a town in the Cynon Valley of Wales. She went to Park School in Aberdare, then Aberdare Girls' Grammar School. She lived for a year in Cardiff, went to Howell's School, Llandaff and finished her education at Oswestry School in Shropshire and at the Lancaster University. She lived in London for two years and lived in Lancaster until 1997. She then moved to Swansea, where she lived until she moved to Canada in 2002.

Walton speaks Welsh: "It's the second language of my family of origin, my grandmother was a well known Welsh scholar and translator, I studied it in school from five to sixteen, I have a ten-year-old's fluency on grammar and vocab but no problem whatsoever with pronunciation."

== Writing career ==
Walton has been writing since she was 13, but her first novel was not published until 2000. Before that, she had been published in a number of role-playing game publications, such as Pyramid, mostly in collaboration with her husband at the time, Ken Walton, co-founder of the Cakebread & Walton games company. Walton was also active in online science fiction fandom, especially in the Usenet groups rec.arts.sf.written and rec.arts.sf.fandom. Her poem "The Lurkers Support Me in E-Mail" is widely quoted on it and in other online arguments, often without her name attached.

Walton's first three novels, The King's Peace (2000), The King's Name (2001) and The Prize in the Game (2002), were all fantasy and set in the same world, which is based on Arthurian Britain and the Táin Bó Cúailnge's Ireland. She won the John W. Campbell Award for Best New Writer in 2002. Her next novel, Tooth and Claw (2003), was intended as a novel Anthony Trollope could have written, but about dragons rather than humans.

Farthing was her first science fiction novel, placing the genre of the cozy mystery firmly inside an alternative history in which the United Kingdom made peace with Adolf Hitler before the involvement of the United States in World War II. It was nominated for a Nebula Award, a Quill Award, the John W. Campbell Memorial Award for best science fiction novel, and the Sidewise Award for Alternate History. A sequel, Ha'penny, was published in October 2007, with the final book in the trilogy, Half a Crown, published in September 2008. Ha'penny won the 2008 Prometheus Award (jointly with Harry Turtledove's novel The Gladiator) and has been nominated for the Lambda Literary Award.

In April 2007, Howard V. Hendrix stated that professional writers should never release their writings online for free, as this made them equivalent to scabs. Walton responded to this by declaring 23 April as International Pixel-Stained Technopeasant Day, a day in which writers who disagreed with Hendrix could release their stories online en masse. In 2008 Walton celebrated this day by posting several chapters of an unfinished sequel to Tooth and Claw, Those Who Favor Fire.

In 2008, Walton began writing an online column for Tor.com, mostly retrospective reviews of older books. A collection of these blog posts were published in What Makes This Book So Great (2014). She also wrote a series of articles revisiting the Hugo award nominees for each year from 1953 to 2000, which were later collected as An Informal History of the Hugos (2018).

Her book, Among Others (2012), won several awards, including both the Hugo Award for Best Novel and Nebula Award for Best Novel. Her recent works include the alternate history My Real Children (2014), which won the Tiptree Award; the Thessaly trilogy (2015–16), a science fiction/fantasy series involving the Greek Gods and a re-imagining of Plato's Republic; and the historical fantasy Lent (2019), set in Renaissance Italy. Her 2020 novel Or What You Will is a metafictional novel about immortality and creativity, featuring an ageing fantasy novelist writing a book set in Renaissance Florence.

In February 2018, Walton was the Literary/Fan Guest of Honor and Keynote Speaker at the 36th annual Life, the Universe, & Everything professional science fiction and fantasy arts symposium.

In November 2022, Walton released her original audio drama Heart's Home, based on a Welsh folk tale, with Odyssey Theatre as part of The Other Path podcast.

== Awards ==
Awards and nominations
Award	Category	Year	Work	Result
Aurora Awards	CSSFA Hall of Fame	2024	Body of work	Inducted
British Fantasy Award	Fantasy Novel	2012	Among Others	Won
BSFA Award	Nonfiction	2021	"Books In Which No Bad Things Happen"	Nominated
Hugo Award	Novel	2012	Among Others	Won
Hugo Award	Related Work	2019	An Informal History of the Hugos	Nominated
James Tiptree Jr. Award	–	2010	Lifelode	Nominated
James Tiptree Jr. Award	–	2015	My Real Children	Won
John W. Campbell Award	New Writer	2001	Jo Walton	Nominated
John W. Campbell Award	New Writer	2002	Jo Walton	Won
John W. Campbell Memorial Award	SF Novel	2007	Farthing	Nominated
Lambda Literary Award	SF, Fantasy & Horror	2008	Ha'penny	Nominated
Locus Award	Fantasy Novel	2012	Among Others	Nominated
Locus Award	Fantasy Novel	2017	Necessity	Nominated
Locus Award	SF Novel	2007	Farthing	Nominated
Locus Award	Collection	2019	Starlings	Nominated
Locus Award	Nonfiction	2015	What Makes This Book So Great	Won
Locus Award	Nonfiction	2019	An Informal History of the Hugos	Nominated
Mythopoeic Award	Adult Literature	2010	Lifelode	Won
Mythopoeic Award	Adult Literature	2012	Among Others	Nominated
Mythopoeic Award	Adult Literature	2017	Thessaly trilogy	Nominated
Mythopoeic Award	Adult Literature	2020	Lent	Nominated
Mythopoeic Award	Adult Literature	2022	Or What You Will	Won
Nebula Award	Novel	2007	Farthing	Nominated
Nebula Award	Novel	2012	Among Others	Won
Prometheus Award	Novel	2008	Ha'penny	Won
Prometheus Award	Novel	2009	Half a Crown	Nominated
Prometheus Award	Novel	2016	The Just City	Nominated
Skylark Award	–	2017	Jo Walton	Won
World Fantasy Award	Novel	2004	Tooth and Claw	Won
World Fantasy Award	Novel	2012	Among Others	Nominated
World Fantasy Award	Novel	2015	My Real Children	Nominated

== Personal life ==
Walton moved to Montreal, Quebec, Canada, after her first novel was published. She is married to Emmet A. O'Brien. She has one child.

== Bibliography ==
=== Novels ===
- —— (November 2003). Tooth and Claw. Tor Books. ISBN 0-7653-0264-0.
- —— (February 2009). Lifelode. NESFA Press. ISBN 1-886778-82-5.
- —— (January 2011). Among Others. Tor Books. ISBN 978-0-7653-2153-4.
- —— (May 2014). My Real Children. Tor Books. ISBN 9780765332653.
- —— (May 2019). Lent. Tor Books. ISBN 9780765379061.
- —— (July 2020). Or What You Will. Tor Books. ISBN 9781250308993.
- —— (July 2026). Everybody's Perfect. Tor Books. ISBN 9781250372604.

==== Sulien series ====
- —— (2000). The King's Peace. Tor Books.
- —— (December 2001). The King's Name. Tor Books. ISBN 0-312-87653-X.
- —— (December 2002). The Prize in the Game. Tor Books. ISBN 0-7653-0263-2.

==== Small Change trilogy ====
- —— (August 2006). Farthing. Tor Books. ISBN 0-7653-1421-5.
- —— (October 2007). Ha'penny. Tor Books. ISBN 0-7653-1853-9.
- —— (August 2008). Half a Crown. Tor Books. ISBN 978-0-7653-1621-9.
- "Escape to Other Worlds with Science Fiction" (short story) (July 2010, Tor Books) (included in Starlings)

==== Thessaly trilogy ====
- —— (January 2015). The Just City. Tor Books. ISBN 9780765332660.
- —— (June 2015). The Philosopher Kings. Tor Books. ISBN 9780765332677.
- —— (July 2016). Necessity. Tor Books. ISBN 9780765379023.
- —— (September 2017). Thessaly, the Complete Trilogy. Tor Books. ISBN 9780765399007.

=== Other works ===
- ——; Walton, Ken (1995). GURPS Celtic Myth (roleplaying supplement).
- —— (1997). The End of the World in Duxford (poem)., inspired by Larry Niven's short story "Inconstant Moon"
- —— (2001). Evans, Eleanor (ed.). Muses and Lurkers (poetry chapbook).
- ——; Walton, Ken (2001). Realms of Sorcery (roleplaying supplement for Warhammer Fantasy Role-Play).
- —— (2009). Sybils and Spaceships (poetry chapbook). NESFA Press.
- —— (2014). What Makes This Book So Great (collected essays and book reviews). Tor Books. ISBN 0765331934.
- —— (2018). Starlings (short story and poetry collection). Tachyon Publications.
- —— (August 2018). An Informal History of the Hugos (collected essays and book reviews). Tor Books.
- ——; Palmer, Ada (March 2026). Trace Elements: Conversations on Science Fiction & Fantasy. Tor Books. ISBN 9781250372604.

=== Short stories ===
- "Sleeper" (2014, Tor.com) (included in "Starlings")
- "Escape to Other Worlds with Science Fiction" (2009, Tor.com) (included in "Starlings")
- "The Jump Rope Rhyme" (2017, Tor.com)
- "A Burden Shared" (2017, Tor.com) (included in "Starlings")

== Critical studies, reviews and biography ==
- "Story behind Ha'Penny by Jo Walton" (2013), from Story Behind the Book: Volume 1
