= Reactor (magazine) =

Online science fiction and fantasy magazine

- Categories: Science fiction, fantasy
- Founded: 2008; 17 years ago
- Company: Macmillan Publishers
- Country: United States
- Language: English
- Website: reactormag.com

Reactor, formerly Tor.com, is an online science fiction and fantasy magazine published by Tor Books, a division of Macmillan Publishers. The magazine publishes articles, reviews, original short fiction, re-reads and commentary on speculative fiction. Unlike traditional print magazines such as Asimov's or Analog, it releases online fiction that can be read free of charge.

Reactor was founded (as Tor.com) in July 2008 and renamed Reactor on January 23, 2024.

== Reception ==
Gardner Dozois called Tor.com "one of the coolest and most eclectic genre-oriented sites on the Internet". He felt in 2011 that its short fiction output that year was weaker than usual, but said it was still a fascinating place to visit. In 2014, The Guardian's Damien Walter remarked on a "digital renaissance" in short SF, and cited a new generation of online magazines, including Lightspeed, Strange Horizons, Tor.com and Escape Pod, as having transformed the genre. Of these, he described Tor.com as "the reigning champion of science-fiction magazines". He noted the broad range of its output, and said that it had published "many of the most exciting new talents" such as Maria Dahvana Headley and Karin Tidbeck.

== Awards ==
Tor.com has won eight Locus Awards for Best Magazine (2015, 2017–23), breaking a 40-year-long streak where the category was only won by Asimov's and F&SF (in addition to Locus itself). For its art direction, Irene Gallo received the 2014 World Fantasy Award for Professional Work.

There have also been several award-winning collections of Tor.com content. Reviews and commentary by Jo Walton were collected in the books What Makes This Book So Great and An Informal History of the Hugos, with the former winning the 2014 Locus Award for Best Non-Fiction, and the latter nominated for the 2019 Hugo and Locus Awards. The fiction anthology, Worlds Seen in Passing: 10 Years of Tor.com Short Fiction, won the 2019 World Fantasy Award for Best Anthology.
