= Black Industries =

Role-playing game publisher

Black Industries was the role-playing game imprint of BL Publishing, the publishing arm of Games Workshop. It was announced on January 28, 2008 that it would cease operations after its products currently scheduled for release are published.

== History ==
In early 2003, after James Wallis shut down Hogshead Publishing, the rights to Warhammer Fantasy Roleplay reverted to Games Workshop; a year later Games Workshop planned to publish a new edition of Warhammer Fantasy Roleplay using their BL Publishing division and created the subdivision Black Industries as a new roleplaying imprint for the game. Games Workshop hired Green Ronin Publishing in 2003 to produce a second edition of Warhammer Fantasy Roleplay, and also a line of supplements which would be sold by Black Industries.

A fourth edition of the Talisman fantasy board game was released in 2007.

Black Industries also developed a Warhammer 40,000 Roleplay game, Dark Heresy, first as a collector's edition and then released the mass-market version on January 26, 2008; just two days later, on January 28, Games Workshop announced that they were closing down Black Industries, claiming its role-playing game products sold poorly compared to the fiction from the Black Library.

Games Workshop gave a new license to Fantasy Flight Games, and the last product from the Green Ronin version of Warhammer Fantasy Roleplay was the Career Compendium (2009) produced by Fantasy Flight Games.
