= Warpstone =

Role-playing game magazine

Warpstone was an independent magazine that covered the topic of Warhammer Fantasy Roleplay. The magazine was in circulation from 1996 to 2014.

The name was derived from warpstone, a fictional mutagen in the Warhammer fictional universe and also in the Warhammer 40,000 universe during the first and second editions. Warhammer materials described warpstone as solidified dark magic with transmutatory and alchemical powers.

== History ==
Warpstone was an unofficial Warhammer magazine. Launched in 1996 by John Foody and John Keane, it featured reviews of official products, interviews, comment pieces, and fan-written material. Some Warpstone articles have been collected into the book Corrupting Influence - The Best of Warpstone: Volume 1 published by Hogshead Publishing.

From April 1999 until their closure at the end of 2002, Hogshead Publishing assumed control over distribution of Warpstone, which made it possible for them to publish material that they were unable to use in official Warhammer publications.

Around the publication of Issue 28, the decision had been made to end the magazine's run with Issue 30. This happened to coincide with a Cease & Desist letter from GW, which delayed further publication while this was resolved.

The final issue 30 was eventually released in November 2014, as a bumper farewell edition.
