= Graeme Davis (game designer) =

British writer and role-playing game designer

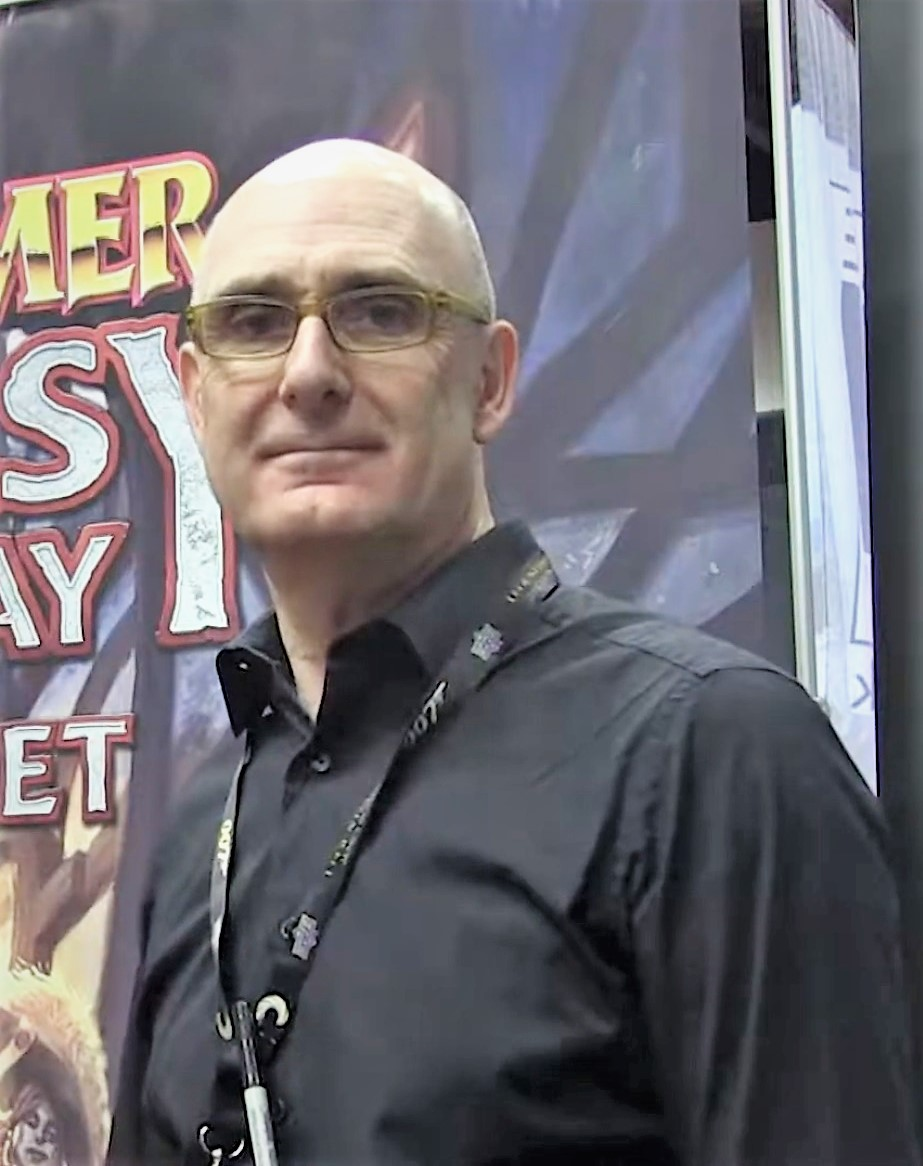
- Born: Isleworth, London, England
- Education: University of Durham
- Occupations: Game designer, writer, and editor
- Employer(s): Games Workshop; Flame Publications
- Notable work: Warhammer Fantasy Roleplay; Mythic Britain & Ireland
- Awards: ENNIE Awards

Graeme Davis is an English game designer, writer, and editor in the tabletop role-playing game industry. He was one of the original designers of Warhammer Fantasy Roleplay in 1986. Davis received three gold ENNIE Awards for Mythic Britain & Ireland in 2022.

== Early life ==
Davis was born in Isleworth, London, England. He started playing Dungeons & Dragons in the mid-1970s, shortly after it was first imported into the United Kingdom. After leaving school, he worked in banking before beginning a Bachelor of Arts degree in archaeology at the University of Durham in 1979. He graduated in 1982. That year, Davis wrote his first paid article about Dungeons & Dragons for Games Workshop's White Dwarf magazine. Other opportunities followed with White Dwarf and TSR, Inc.'s Imagine.

== Career ==
Davis was one of the original designers of Warhammer Fantasy Roleplay (1986). In 1989, Games Workshop transferred the game to the company's new subsidiary Flame Publications, where Davis remained on staff. Davis wrote the 1987 Fighting Fantasy gamebook, Midnight Rogue.

Davis published his first novel, Blood and Honor, book four in the Eberron The War-Torn series, in 2006. Since 2009, Davis has been the line editor for Rogue Games' historical horror RPG Colonial Gothic, contributing to several titles in the line.

In 2022, Davis wrote Mythic Britain & Ireland, an expansion for Vaesen, which won three 2023 Gold ENNIE Awards: Product of the Year, Best Setting, and Best Interior Art. In an interview with Wargamer, Davis explained that he had worked hard to honor the diversity of British and Irish folklore, and that his strategy for writing adventures was "not to overthink, trust yourself, and always keep the players in mind."

== Published works (as primary or contributing writer) ==
- Warhammer Fantasy Roleplay 1st edition (1986) and 2nd edition (2005)
- "Rough Night in the Three Feathers", WFRP 1 ed. module published in White Dwarf 94 (1987), updated for WFRP 2e in Plundered Vaults (2005)
- Midnight Rogue, Fighting Fantasy, Puffin Books, 1987.
- Terror in the Dark, an expansion for Advanced Heroquest, Games Workshop, 1991.
- Celts Campaign Sourcebook, Advanced Dungeons & Dragons 2nd ed. TSR (1992)
- GURPS Vikings (Steve Jackson Games; 2nd ed. 2002) ISBN 978-1-55634-512-8 (+ other GURPS titles)
- Creatures of Freeport (Green Ronin; 2004)
- Ashes of Middenheim (WFRP 2nd edition scenario), 2005.
- Blood and Honor (Eberron novel, September 2006)
- The Edge of Night (adventure for Warhammer Fantasy Roleplay, 3rd edition; Fantasy Flight Games; 2010)
- Mythic Britain & Ireland, an expansion for Vaesen (RPG), Free League Publishing, 2022
