= Warhammer Campaign =

Role-playing game supplement

Cover art by John Blanche, 1988

Warhammer Campaign is a set of two adventures published by Games Workshop (GW) in 1988 for the fantasy role-playing game Warhammer Fantasy Roleplay.

== Description ==
Warhammer Campaign is a repackaging of two previously published adventures:

- The Enemy Within (1986) is designed to provide background about the region of the Warhammer Old World called the Empire. It also contains a short scenario, "Mistaken Identity", designed to introduce new players to the region and the game rules.
- Shadows Over Bögenhafen (1987) is an adventure where the player characters discover a sinister plot while visiting a town fair and must enter the town's sewers.

The two adventures, both designed by Jim Bambra, Phil Gallagher, and Graeme Davis, would become the first two parts of the six-part The Enemy Within Campaign, followed by Death on the Reik (1987), Power Behind the Throne (1988), Something Rotten in Kislev (1989), and Empire in Flames (1989).

== Publication history ==
GW first published Warhammer Fantasy Roleplay in 1986, and immediately released the first of six linked adventures for it, The Enemy Within, as a softcover book. This was followed in 1987 by another softcover book, Shadows Over Bögenhafen. In 1988 GW combined both adventures into Warhammer Campaign, a 136-page hardcover book with interior art by Tony Ackland, Martin McKenna, Ian Miller, Wil Rees, Tim Sell, and Euan Smith, cartography by Dave Andrews, Geoff Wingate and Charles Elliot, and cover art by John Blanche.

== Reception ==
In Issue 8 of The Games Machine, John Woods found the book to be well-produced and easy to follow, and he liked the short introductory scenario "Mistaken Identity", calling it "entertaining and clearly written to make the referee's job easier." But he had mixed feelings overall, saying, "the linearity of plot makes life very difficult for a referee whose players try to tackle problems in unusual ways and come up with angles the designers haven't thought of."

== Reviews ==
- White Wolf #9 (1988)
