= Something Rotten in Kislev =

Role-playing game supplement

Cover art by Richard Dolan

Something Rotten in Kislev is a supplement published by Games Workshop in 1988 as the fifth installment of The Enemy Within Campaign created for the fantasy role-playing game Warhammer Fantasy Roleplay. Although it received good critical reception, there were complaints that this product did not match the previous four installements in tone, and in a later edition of the campaign, Something Rotten in Kislev was replaced.

== Description ==
Something Rotten in Kislev is the fifth part of The Enemy Within campaign, and picks up where the previous supplement, Power Behind the Throne, ends. The player characters are sent by the Graf of Middenheim to give aid to the Tsar of the Kislev. After a 10-page introduction to Kislev, the balance of the book is broken into three linked adventures:

1. "The Child Beast": The characters are sent to the village of Voltsara to deal with attacks from beastmen, and must negoiate with animistic spirits to discern the true nature of the beastmen.
2. "Death on Vacation": The characters are sent to the colony of Chernozavrta, which is being besieged by tribesmen, who are in turn being besieged by a hobgoblin army. The characters must negotiate with the hobgoblins and find a way past the tribesmen in order to enter the colony, which is filled with undead. Once the characters discover the truth of the situation, they must then find a way to escape.
3. "The Champions of Death": The characters are sent to investigate strange happenings in the city of Bolgasgrad, where the undead walk the streets.

The book includes two removable cardstock maps.

== Publication history ==
The six-part campaign The Enemy Within, designed for the fantasy role-playing game Warhammer Fantasy Roleplay, was published between 1986 and 1989. The fifth installment, Something Rotten in Kislev, was a 144-page hardcover book written by Ken Rolston with contributions by Graeme Davis. Cover art was by Richard Dolan and interior art was by Paul Bonner, Ian Cooke, Martin McKenna, Tim Pollard and Maz Shepherd. It was released in 1988.

In 1995, Hogshead Publishing acquired the license to Warhammer Fantasy Roleplay and published an updated version of the series as six hardcover books.

In 2017, Cubicle 7 acquired the license for Warhammer Fantasy Roleplay, and in 2019, began publishing a Director's Cut of the campaign for the fourth edition of the game. There had been complaints that Something Rotten in Kislev did not match the tone of the preceding adventures, and Cubicle 7 replaced it with The Horned Rat, created by Graeme Davis, with contributions by Dave Allen, Mac Dara Mac Donnacha, Chris Handley, Andy Law, Elaine Lithgow, TS Luikart, Pádraig Murphy, Clive Oldfield, Dylan Owen, Ciarán O'Brien, Síne Quinn, Anthony Ragan, and Simon Wileman.

== Reception ==
In the November 1989 edition of Dragon (Issue 151), Jim Bambra called this "a real treat, in both visual presentation and quality of adventure material." Bambra thought the content was very good, commenting, "The adventures are rich in color and staging tips. Dialogue is used to good effect to handle character interaction with NPCs by depicting their speech patterns and mannerisms." Bambra noted that this product "is geared toward interactive roleplaying and problem solving. It contains its fair share of combat, but the interaction with NPCs makes it really special. While suitably dark and dismal, it also has its humorous moments as the adventurers deal with dangerous nature spirits, proud but superstitious nomads, petty nobles, and a necromancer with a social conscience." Bambra concluded with a positive recommendation, saying, "Something Rotten in Kislev is one of the best adventures that I've seen in a long time. It scores high in every department, and the graphics are superb. Even if you have no interest in Warhammer Fantasy Roleplay, check this one out; you won't be disappointed. Many of its elements can be easily used in other roleplaying games. In short, it's a classic."

In his 1990 book The Complete Guide to Role-Playing Games, game critic Rick Swan called this "a brilliant series of linked adventures that blends humor, high adventure, and interpersonal relationships; a state-of-the-art fantasy supplement." Swan rated this #7 on his list of "The Ten Best Role-Playing Adventures."

In his 1991 book Heroic Worlds, game historian Lawrence Schick called this "the ultimate zombie adventure as the heroes confront way too many dead guys in the Russianesque city of Kislev."

In his 2023 book Monsters, Aliens, and Holes in the Ground, RPG historian Stu Horvath noted that Something Rotten in Kislev was "a tonal digression ... It is worth noting that Cubicle 7's lush, 10-volume modernization of the campaign (2020-2022) completely replaces Kislev."

== Awards ==
Something Rotten in Kislev was a finalist for a Games International Award in the category "Best Role-playing Game of 1989."
