= Power Behind the Throne =

Role-playing game supplement

Cover art by The Edwards

Power Behind the Throne is a supplement published by Games Workshop in 1988 as the fourth installment of The Enemy Within Campaign created for the fantasy role-playing game Warhammer Fantasy Roleplay.

== Description ==
Power Behind the Throne is the fourth part of The Enemy Within campaign, and picks up where the previous supplement, Death on the Reik, ends. The player characters arrive in the city of Middenheim at the onset of carnival week, but quickly find that new and onerous taxes are alienating large sections of the population. The characters must interact with a large number of non-player characters in order to uncover the web of plots that threaten to bury the city.

== Publication history ==
The six-part campaign The Enemy Within, designed for the fantasy role-playing game Warhammer Fantasy Roleplay, was published between 1986 and 1989. The fourth installment, Power Behind the Throne, was a 112-page hardcover book written by Carl Sargent, with cover art by The Edwards and interior art by John Blanche, Paul Bonner, Charles Elliott, Tony Hough, Martin McKenna, and Russ Nicholson. It was released in 1988 as a 112-page hardcover book that also contained a pullout map of Middenheim.

Creator Carl Sargent created so many notes about the city of Middenheim that these were gathered together and published as a separate sourcebook, Warhammer City.

In 1995, Hogshead Publishing acquired the license to Warhammer Fantasy Roleplay and published an updated version of the series as six hardcover books. There had been some criticism that there was too great a time interval between Death on the Reik and Power Behind the Throne, so Hogshead added a short scenario created by James Wallis titled Carrion Up the Reik, to provide a link between the two adventures.

In 2017, Cubicle 7 acquired the license for Warhammer Fantasy Roleplay, and in 2019, began publishing a Director's Cut of the campaign for the fourth edition of the game, including a new edition of Power Behind the Throne, which was accompanied by a separate companion volume with additional bonus material.

== Reception ==
In the April 1990 edition of Dragon (Issue 156), Ken Rolston called this "an exceptional example of the diplomatic style of fantasy role-play gaming (a style singularly suited for sophisticated urban adventuring) with complex plotting, impenetrable intrigues, and cleverly drawn NPC characterizations." Rolston did point out "the link between the previous adventure in the series, Death on the Reik, and Power Behind the Throne, and the pretext for the PCs becoming involved in Middenheim's webs of intrigue are a bit thin."

In Issue 9 of the British magazine The Games Machine, John Woods noted "the book contains an appropriate array of attractions to amuse and divert players. A city map is included and, most importantly, details of a large number of non-player characters, interaction with which forms the backbone of the adventure." Woods concluded that this adventure was "An unusual scenario with a greater need for referee and player skill than its predecessors - should be a lot of fun."

In Issue 10 of Warpstone, John Foody reviewed the Hogshead edition of Power Behind the Throne and commented that "the scenario may be excellent in theory, but in practice can be difficult both to run and play. Indeed, even its greatest supporters agree that gamemasters need to be experienced before attempting to run it." Foody also found the cover art was misleading, and the quality of the interior art was "variable." Foody liked the mini-scenario that linked the previous adventure, writing, "Although little more than a small series of encounters, the roleplaying aspects of the scenario are strong, as is the atmosphere." Foody noted the many possible encounters with non-player characters, and suggested, "Inexperienced GMs, or those who have players who are not used to taking the initiative, may well struggle. There are few trigger events to push the PCs or the plot along. The GM is required to be fully confident with the adventure, especially the motivations and goals of the numerous NPCs, juggling them all as PCs criss-cross the city from one meeting to another. There is a danger that those who are ill-prepared may end up umming and ahhing far too much for comfort." Foody also pointed out that there was no description of what would happen should the characters fail to foil the evil plot, calling this "an important omission." Despite all these shortcomings, Foody concluded by called this "an excellent adventure, [although it] is not the best scenario that The Enemy Within has to offer ... It is atmospheric, and I would say the best example I have seen of what a city based scenario should be. It makes a worthy addition to the Enemy Within Campaign, especially with the inclusion of the Carrion up the Reik scenario.

== Reviews ==
- Envoyer
- Shadis #52 (Oct., 1998)
