= De Profundis (role-playing game) =

Tabletop or correspondence role-playing game by Michał Oracz

De Profundis: Letters from the Abyss is a correspondence-based role-playing game created by Michał Oracz that was originally published by Polish game company Portal in 2001, then translated to English and published by Hogshead Publishing in 2002. Unusually, the game is not played via dialogue, but rather by the exchange of letters between players.

== Description ==
De Profundis is a two-player game in which players create the game's narrative by writing each other letters in the style of horror author H. P. Lovecraft. (Designer Michal Oracz wrote the sourcebook as a series of letters in Lovecraftian style which tell of the transcription of a game that the author of the letters saw in a dream.) The game has almost no role-playing game mechanics. There is no wargame apparatus, no die rolls, no statistics, and no gamemaster. Rather, it emphasizes character and atmosphere. There is also an option for solo play, and there are rules for accommodating more than two players.

The sourcebook recommends that players communicate through physical correspondence in order to capture the mood of Lovecraft's stories, to encourage the players to take ample time in crafting each response, and to allow for the exchange of props or strange artifacts between players. Despite this recommendation, nothing in the rules precludes playing through other media, and games have been adapted for play by email, blog posts, or any combination of methods. The blog De Profundis (Che 2002) is an instance of solo play-by-post gaming via a blog.

The use of correspondence does not necessarily mean the game is play by mail. The Diana Jones Award committee noted that the game instead reinvents the role-playing form. Hogshead marketed De Profundis with the tagline, "This game is intended for mentally stable adults".

According to game historian Shannon Appelcline, "It was a Lovecraftian-styled game but about as far from Call of Cthulhu as you can get. It is best remembered for its correspondence rules, which allowed players to rather uniquely play the game through the exchange of in-character letters. Like most of the other New Style games, it did not include a Games Master and was oriented toward telling stories."

== Publication history ==
Polish game designer Michał Oracz created De Profundis, which was published by Polish game company Portal in 2001.

Three years before, in 1998, British company Hogshead Publishing had released the pioneering narrative storytelling game The Extraordinary Adventures of Baron Munchausen, which became the first in a series of "New Style" storytelling games that included Nobilis (1999) and Violence (1999). The final game in Hogshead's New Style line was an English translation of De Profundis published in 2002.

However, later the same year, in November 2002, James Wallis, Director of Hogshead Publishing, announced that Hogshead was leaving the adventure gaming industry due to boredom, creative frustration, and increasing despondence about the future of the specialist gaming industry. Hogshead returned the rights of the New Style games to their creators.

The English version of De Profundis went out of print, although the Polish version was still available from Portal.

De Profundis was reprinted by Cubicle 7 in 2010.

== Reception ==
In his 2023 book Monsters, Aliens, and Holes in the Ground, RPG historian Stu Horvath noted, "There is an intimacy in letter writing that the game seeks to embrace, encouraging play to involve ink and paper, rather than emails and blogs ... There is also a lack of surety. Who is reading what is sent? Who is writing what is received? Can any of this really be trusted?" Looking back more than twenty years after its publication, Horvath believed that this game "reinvents the RPG ... It is an entirely new form, with few rules or impediments. All that's needed to play is a pen, a piece of paper, a twisted imagination, and the price of postage." Horvath concluded, "De Profundis revels something essential but previously hidden about how little structure a game needs to still be recognizable as something that can be played. Thankfully, though, that revelation lacks tentacles."

== Awards ==
The game was shortlisted for the 2001 Diana Jones Award for Excellence in Gaming.

== Other reviews and commentary ==
- Pyramid
- Envoyer #69
- Świat Gier Komputerowych #102

== Sources ==
- Baugh, Bruce (13 December 2001). "De Profundis Playtest Review". RPGnet: The Inside Scoop on Gaming. Archived from the original (http) on January 18, 2003.
- Che (2002). "De Profundis" (http). My Journal.
- Kim, John H. (January 3, 2006). "RPG Company List Entries: P-Q" (http). Game Company Listings.
- Wespenklatsche, Paul (May 24, 2015). "Bridges of Maastricht" (http). De Profundis by blog.
