= Warhammer City =

Warhammer City is a role-playing game supplement published by Games Workshop in 1987 for Warhammer Fantasy Roleplay.

== Contents ==
Warhammer City is a campaign setting supplement which details Middenheim, the second largest city in the Empire, including its history, religion, politics, military, law, inns and significant locations, encounters, chaos cults, undercity, average buildings, and also the rules for a game called Snotball.

== Publication history ==
Warhammer City: A Complete Guide to Middenheim - City of the White Wolf was written by Carl Sargent with Phil Gallagher, Jim Bambra, Paul Cockburn, Graeme Davis, and Sean Masterson, with a cover by Ian Miller, and was published by Chaosium, Inc. in 1987 as an 96-page hardcover book with a bound-in color map.

Hogshead Publishing later published this book as "Middenheim: City of Chaos".

== Reviews ==
- Dragon #156
- InQuest Gamer #41 (as "Middenheim: City of Chaos")
- Portal (Issue 4 - Apr 2000)
- Warpstone (Issue 9 - Aug 1998)
