= Shadows Over Bögenhafen =

Fantasy role-playing game supplement

Shadows Over Bögenhafen is a supplement published by Games Workshop in 1987 as the second installment of The Enemy Within Campaign created for the fantasy role-playing game Warhammer Fantasy Roleplay.

== Description ==
Shadows Over Bögenhafen is the second part of The Enemy Within campaign, and starts where the first publication, The Enemy Within, ends. The adventure involves an urban investigation taking place during the Schaffenfest (the fair) in the small town of Bögenhafen, where the characters will have to set out in pursuit of a zoo attraction having escaped into the sewers, and will discover that very strange things are happening in the town.

== Publication history ==
The six-part campaign The Enemy Within, designed for the fantasy role-playing game Warhammer Fantasy Roleplay, was published between 1986 and 1989. The second installment, Shadows Over Bögenhafen, was written by Phil Gallagher, Jim Bambra, and Graeme Davis, with cover art and illustrations by Martin McKenna and Ian Miller, and cartography by Charles Elliot. It was released in 1987 as a boxed set containing an 45-page adventure book, a map of the area and a map of a temple.

Games Workshop republished the first three parts of The Enemy Within in 1989 as Warhammer Adventure.

In 1995, Hogshead Publishing acquired the license to Warhammer Fantasy Roleplay and published an updated version as a series of softcover books.

In 2017, Cubicle 7 acquired the license for Warhammer Fantasy Role-Play, and in 2019, began publishing a Director's Cut of the campaign for the fourth edition of the game, including a new edition of Shadows Over Bögenhafen, which was accompanied by a separate companion volume with additional bonus material.

== Reception ==
In the July–August 1988 edition of Space Gamer/Fantasy Gamer (Issue No. 82), Richard A. Edwards had high praise for Shadows Over Bögenhafen, commenting that, "The descriptions and encounters of the Schaffenfest (as the fair is called) are first rate and even the minor random encounters can generate hours of play." The only issue Edwards had as "Due to the huge amount of information provided, some of the details are hard to locate easily. It seems there should be some better way to organize the material, but the effort to organize it is obvious."

In the September 1987 issue of White Dwarf, Phil Gallagher noted the "variety of locations throughout the Reikland, with numerous sub-plots and motivations for the GM to use as prods when necessary." Gallagher concluded that the end of the adventure, "should provide more than a few tense moments for the players, not to mention a shock or two."

In Issue 3 of the Finnish magazine Sininen Lohikäärme, Harri Heinonen thought that this supplement was "A detective adventure at its purest. It contains the ingredients for a truly chilling climax."

In Issue 8 of the British games magazine The Games Machine, John Woods was conflicted by this supplement, commenting that it was "easy to follow, the Empire background апd Bogenhafen descriptions (including a large pull-out map) could be useful for tuning your own adventures as well as this one, but the linearity of plot makes life very difficult for a referee whose players try to tackle problems in unusual ways and come up with angles the designers haven't thought of."

In Issue 126 of Dragon (October 1987), Ken Rolston liked the overall look of the boxed set, commenting, "it's got lots of nice enclosures, particularly the color fold-out map of Bögenhafen and the color tactical map for the adventure's grand finale, along with graphically-appealing player handouts and GM maps and references. And what a swell cover." But Rolston found the real value of the supplement lay in its content, writing, "The real charm of the pack is in the text and the presentation of the adventure ... The atmosphere is beautifully grim, the plot mysterious and full of nifty twists, and the consequences of the failure of the PCs to foil the plot are — well, they're pretty spectacular." Rolston concluded with a strong recommendation, saying, "Instead of jamming dozens of episodes and encounters into the pack, a few very good episodes and encounters are well-staged and elaborately developed. And the illustrations and graphic presentation? In a word, Stunning. Are you following me here? This is Good. Real Good."

Stewart Wieck reviewed Shadows Over Bogenhafen in White Wolf #9 (1988), rating it an 8 out of 10 and stated that "The Enemy Within, Shadows Over Bogenhafen, and Death on the Reik are all very attractive and worthwhile supplements."

In Issue 37 of the French games magazine Casus Belli (April 1987), Jean Balczesak reviewed the first two parts of The Enemy Within Campaign (The Enemy Within and Shadows over Bögenhafen) and was impressed with both of them, writing, "If the upcoming publications for Warhammer Fantasy Roleplay are of a similar quality to these first two releases, we don't see what could prevent this game from achieving the success it deserves!"
