= Violence (role-playing game) =

Tabletop role-playing game by Greg Costikyan

The Role-Playing Game of Egregious and Repulsive Bloodshed
- Cover of Violence.
- Designers: Greg Costikyan
- Publishers: Hogshead Publishing
- Publication: 1999
- Genres: Horror
- Systems: Custom

Violence: The Role-Playing Game of Egregious and Repulsive Bloodshed is a short, 32-page role-playing game written by Greg Costikyan under the pseudonym "Designer X" and was published by Hogshead Publishing in 1999 as part of its New Style line of games.

== Gameplay ==
Violence is a satire of conventional dungeon-bashing games, set in a contemporary metropolis where the player characters dash from room to room killing the occupants and stealing their belongings. It is relentlessly user-hostile, taking time out to insult the reader wherever possible (it opens with the words, "Welcome to Violence, you degraded turd") and uses a system where the user can buy experience points for cash from the designer or publisher. The rule-set provides information on a range of things related to killing. Weapons, combat styles, and the like are intricately detailed.

== Publication history ==
Violence (1999) was designed by Greg Costikyan (a.k.a. Designer X) and was published with cover art by Clint Langley in 1999 as one of the New Style role-playing games published by Hogshead Publishing, a series of experimental and alternative role-playing games that included The Extraordinary Adventures of Baron Munchausen, Pantheon, and Puppetland/Powerkill.

In August 2005, Costikyan released Violence under a Creative Commons license, and made it available for download.

A Spanish language edition exists.

== Reception ==
In his 2011 book Designers & Dragons, game historian Shannon Appelcline noted that Violence "was probably the least loved of the New Style games. Like Power Kill it was a largely social commentary. It used humor and satire to critique violence in role-playing games and was sufficiently biting that [game designer James] Wallis thought of it as a Modest Proposal for the role-playing game industry. Set in the modern day, Violence lets players do dungeon crawls into places like the homes of illegal immigrants, kill them and take their stuff. However, satire did not necessarily produce a playable role-playing game on its own."

In his 2023 book Monsters, Aliens, and Holes in the Ground, RPG historian Stu Horvath noted, "The book is grotesque, sneering, and snide, explicitly calling itself disgusting and questioning the moral fiber of anyone willing to read it. It's often quite funny but also gets at a deep frustration regarding the centering of violence in all sorts of play — tabletop games, videogames, make believe.
