= Daniel D. Fox =

- Born: Daniel D. Fox; Kansas City, Missouri
- Occupation: Game designer
- Writing career
- Genre: Role-playing games
- Website: sllswrd.games

Daniel D. Fox is an American game designer and writer, as well as a founder of Grim & Perilous Studios. He is best known as the creator of ZWEIHÄNDER Grim & Perilous RPG, MAIN GAUCHE: Grim & Perilous Supplement and Dark Astral.

== Personal life ==
Daniel D. Fox is from Kansas City.

== Career ==
=== Early career ===
Fox spent most of his career in advertising, working for WPP plc at VMLY&R, and began his career in game design on Strike To Stun (a popular destination for the Warhammer Fantasy Roleplay community). Following his contributions to several fan-made supplements for WFRP, Fox began writing an Old School Revival manuscript for a new RPG based on Warhammer Fantasy Roleplay. He later brought the book to Kickstarter, publishing ZWEIHÄNDER Grim & Perilous RPG in 2017.

=== Andrews McMeel Publishing ===
Fox accepted a job offer from Andrews McMeel Publishing in May 2019 as executive creative director of games. Working as an RPG designer for Andrews McMeel Publishing, he redesigned ZWEIHÄNDER Grim & Perilous RPG Revised Core Rulebook with new mechanics, errata, artwork and layout design. Fox's work also includes Dark Astral (2018) and MAIN GAUCHE: Grim & Perilous Supplement (2019).

Fox was a notable guest at Gen Con in 2018, and spoke as a keynote presenter on Twitch 2018, following ZWEIHÄNDER Grim & Perilous RPG winning Best Game and Product of the Year at the ENnies.

Fox later began running a games division at McMeel. McMeel released Blackbirds in 2022, the first role-playing game to he "powered by Zweihänder", created by Ryan Verniere using the system created by Fox. Fox created several additional tabletop games using the lore and mechanics of Zweihänder.

Fox announced that he would be leaving McMeel at the end of 2022, and Andrews McMeel shuttered their RPG-focused account on Twitter account on January 3, 2023.

=== World of Game Design ===
SLLSWRD Publishing announced in 2024 that Fox reacquired the license to Zweihänder from World of Game Design.

== Bibliography ==
Games Fox has written or contributed to include the following:

=== Role Playing Games ===
- ZWEIHÄNDER Grim & Perilous RPG Revised Core Rulebook (2019) (Andrews McMeel Publishing)
- MAIN GAUCHE: Grim & Perilous RPG (2019) (Andrews McMeel Publishing)
- SLLSWRD Magazine #1 (2018) (Grim & Perilous Studios)
- Dark Astral (2018) (Grim & Perilous Studios)
- ZWEIHÄNDER Grim & Perilous RPG (2017) (Grim & Perilous Studios)
