= The Enemy Within Campaign =

Tabletop role-playing game campaign

The Enemy Within campaign (abbreviated to TEW) is a series of adventures for Warhammer Fantasy Roleplay where hidden powers of Chaos plot the destruction of the Empire. It was originally published by Games Workshop in the late 1980s. Praised as a detailed campaign that actually told a story, it was voted the best RPG campaign of all time by Casus Belli magazine.

== Description ==
In the six-part series The Enemy Within, player characters discover that insidious forces are working behind the scenes to bring the great Empire down. Only through heroic measures by the adventurers can the Empire be saved.

Each of the six parts takes place in a different setting such as caravan trails, river rafting, urban adventures and dungeon crawling.

== Publication history ==
The Enemy Within was originally published in six volumes by Games Workshop between 1986 and 1989:

- The Enemy Within (1986) - Jim Bambra, Phil Gallagher, Graeme Davis
- Shadows Over Bögenhafen (1987) - Graeme Davis, Jim Bambra, Phil Gallagher
- Death on the Reik (1987) - Phil Gallagher, Jim Bambra, Graeme Davis
- Power Behind the Throne (1988) - Carl Sargent
- Something Rotten in Kislev (1988) - Ken Rolston (additional writing by Graeme Davis)
- Empire in Flames (1989) - Carl Sargent

The first three installments of the campaign were published as boxed sets. For example, The Enemy Within contained:

- a 56-page booklet
- a 22” x 34” color foldout map of the Empire
- two 11” x 17” card-stock sheets with player handouts, maps, diagrams, and gamemaster references

The later installments were published as single volumes in either softcover or hardcover.

Games Workshop would republish parts of the campaign under several different titles:

- Warhammer Campaign (1988) - collected The Enemy Within and Shadows Over Bögenhafen
- Warhammer Adventure (1989) - a boxed set collecting The Enemy Within, Shadows Over Bögenhafen, and Death on the Reik
- Warhammer: City of Chaos (1989) - collected Power Behind the Throne and Warhammer City, a sourcebook for the city of Middenheim

In 1989, Games Workshop lost interest in its role-playing system, and after the final installment of the series was published, Games Workshop quit RPGs to focus on its miniatures wargames.

In 1995, Hogshead Publishing acquired the license to Warhammer Fantasy Roleplay and published an updated version of the series:

- Shadows Over Bögenhafen, collecting The Enemy Within and the original Shadows Over Bögenhafen
- Death on the Reik
- Power Behind the Throne, including a new scenario by James Wallis
- Something Rotten in Kislev

Because Empires in Flame had not originally been written as part of The Enemy Within, having been hastily revamped to provide a conclusion to the campaign, James Wallis intended to write a new finale for the campaign that would have been titled Empire in Chaos, but this was never published.

Fantasy Flight Games acquired the Warhammer license in 2008. In 2012, they released an all-new The Enemy Within campaign by Graeme Davis and Dave Allen. Although inspired by the tone and themes of the original, this version of the campaign featured a completely new premise.

In 2017, Warhammer Fantasy Role-Play was licensed by Cubicle 7. In 2019, they began publishing a Director's Cut of the campaign for the fourth edition of the game. In addition to revising the original adventures, each volume was accompanied by a separate companion volume with additional bonus material.

- Enemy in Shadows, collecting The Enemy Within (retitled Mistaken Identity) and Shadows Over Bögenhafen
- Death on the Reik
- Power Behind the Throne
- The Horned Rat, a new adventure replacing Something Rotten in Kislev
- Empire in Ruins, a new adventure replacing Empire in Flames

== Reception ==
In Issue 37 of the French games magazine Casus Belli (April 1987), Jean Balczesak reviewed the first two parts of The Enemy Within Campaign (The Enemy Within and Shadows over Bögenhafen) and was impressed with both of them, writing, "If the upcoming publications for Warhammer Fantasy Roleplay are of a similar quality to these first two releases, we don't see what could prevent this game from achieving the success it deserves!"

In the July–August 1988 edition of Space Gamer/Fantasy Gamer (Issue No. 82), Richard A. Edwards reviewed the first three installments in the series, and had high praise the first adventure The Enemy Within, saying, "If you want to bring your roleplaying group a new experience in roleplaying and introduce them to new complexities of plot then run, do not walk, to your game store and purchase a copy." Regarding Shadows Over Bögenhafen and Death on the Reik, he commented that, "Those Game Masters who want a well done town for use in their own campaign could certainly use the information provided for Bogenhafen... The graphical presentation of this series is amazing. The detailed castle map is useable in any gaming situation which could require one and the river material is likewise useable in other systems. But the real value of this package is as part of the continuing saga of The Enemy Within."

In Issue 9 of The Games Machine, John Woods reviewed the fourth adventure in the series and noted a change in style from the previous adventures: "Whereas previous scenarios in this series have been fairly typical action-packed mysteries with rather linear plotlines (too linear on occasion - things can get awkward for the referee if players think of courses of action the designers didn’t anticipate), this adventure is a more open-ended political thriller."

== Reviews ==
- White Wolf #9 (1988)
