= The Enemy Within (Warhammer Fantasy Roleplay) =

Role-playing game supplement

The Enemy Within is a supplement published by Games Workshop in 1986 for the fantasy role-playing game Warhammer Fantasy Roleplay as the introduction to the 6-part The Enemy Within Campaign.

== Contents ==
The Enemy Within is the first of six linked adventures in The Enemy Within Campaign that takes place in the Warhammer setting, where hidden powers of Chaos plot the destruction of the Empire.

The Enemy Within is designed to introduce players to the Warhammer setting. A 56-page booklet outlines how to run a campaign, and summarizes the history and setting of the Empire.

The final 16 pages of the booklet contains an introductory adventure, "Mistaken Identity", in which one of the player characters discovers their double among the corpses of a mutant raid during a stagecoach trip, and the character is provided with a letter announcing a more than interesting inheritance.

The Enemy Within also contains

- a 22” x 34” color foldout map of the Empire
- two 11” x 17” card-stock sheets with player handouts, maps, diagrams, and gamemaster references

== Publication history ==
The six-part The Enemy Within Campaign, designed for the fantasy role-playing game Warhammer Fantasy Roleplay, was published between 1986 and 1989. The first installment, The Enemy Within, was written by Phil Gallagher, Jim Bambra, and Graeme Davis. It was released in 1986 as a boxed set.

Games Workshop republished the first three parts of The Enemy Within Campaign in 1989 as a softcover book titled Warhammer Adventure.

In 1995, Hogshead Publishing acquired the license to Warhammer Fantasy Roleplay and published an updated version of the entire The Enemy Within Campaign as a series of six softcover books.

In 2017, Cubicle 7 acquired the license for Warhammer Fantasy Role-Play, and in 2019, began publishing a Director's Cut of the campaign for the fourth edition of the game, including a new edition of The Enemy Within, which was accompanied by a separate companion volume with additional bonus material.

== Reception ==
In the August 1987 edition of Dragon (Issue #124), Ken Rolston thought "the designers effectively exploit the distinctive tone and campaign background of Warhammer Fantasy Roleplay." Rolston also admired the production values, saying, "the talented Games Workshop graphic design squad does a bang-up job on the look and feel of the package [...] The whole package has the agreeable heft of volume and the eye-pleasing impact of quality." However, Rolston felt the adventure railroaded the players, forcing them to follow a prescribed path. Despite this, he concluded with a thumbs up, saying, "The Enemy Within is recommended as a campaign supplement and adventure for WFR, and for students of superior supplement presentation. Despite the stated reservations about the adventure, the package is quite good and an indication that supplement support for WFR should be substantial and satisfying."

In the July–August 1988 edition of Space Gamer/Fantasy Gamer (Issue No. 82), Richard A. Edwards had high praise for this adventure, saying, "If you want to bring your roleplaying group a new experience in roleplaying and introduce them to new complexities of plot then run, do not walk, to your game store and purchase a copy."

In Issue 37 of the French games magazine Casus Belli (April 1987), Jean Balczesak called this supplement "incredibly rich. Politics, history or religion, everything is covered! It is more focused on role playing than on combat." Balczesak concluded, "Even if you don't play Warhammer, check out this supplement, it's full of ideas that can be used for any medieval fantasy game."

Stewart Wieck reviewed The Enemy Within in White Wolf #9 (1988), rating it an 8 out of 10 and stated that "The Enemy Within, Shadows Over Bogenhafen, and Death on the Reik are all very attractive and worthwhile supplements."

In Issue 4 of Australian Realms, Colin Taber used this supplement as an example of how to properly set up a fictional thieves' guild that has seduced and corrupted city officials, writing, "The aim of the seduction being to infiltrate the local government, through, and with the help of the guild ... It can be adapted to make a powerful and extremely dangerous opponent. If you were setting up a campaign think of how hard it would be, even for the most experienced characters to clean up and expose a city or town which is controlled by an alliance of a chaos warped thieves guild and Skaven or Beastmen."
