= Once Upon a Time (game) =

Card game

- Third edition box cover
- Designers: Richard Lambert; Andrew Rilstone; James Wallis
- Publishers: Atlas Games
- Publication: 1994; 32 years ago
- Players: 2–6
- Playing time: 15 minutes
- Skills: Storytelling

Once Upon a Time is a card game produced by Atlas Games in 1994 in which the players collaborate to tell a story, each to use up all of the storytelling cards in their hand first.

== Description ==
One object of Once Upon a Time is to tell a fairy tale as a group. While the story is developed by the whole group, the competitive aspect of the game is that each player has an individual goal of using all of the "Storytelling" cards they have in hand, and finishing the story with their own special "Happy Ever After" card.

Only one player at a time is the current storyteller, giving them a chance to play their Storytelling cards, while the other players have a chance to "interrupt" the story and become the storyteller if, for example, the storyteller mentions something on one of the interrupting player's cards.

=== Gameplay ===
Each player is dealt a hand of cards that represent story elements: objects, people, events, and "aspects" often involved in fairy tales (for instance, there are cards for "crown", "key", "stepmother", "a death", "time passes", "sleeping", et cetera). These "Storytelling" cards represent ingredients of a fairy tale, i.e. words or phrases that are likely to appear in fairy tales. From a different deck of cards, each player is also dealt a single "Happy Ever After" ending card, to be kept secret from other players until it is used. The object of the game for each player is to use their cards in telling a story, finishing the story by using their Happy Ever After card.

One player at a time is the storyteller. (The second edition rules suggest the starting storyteller could be the "player with the longest beard", or any other method upon which the players agree.) Whenever a story ingredient is mentioned, if any player has a Storytelling card for that ingredient, he or she can play it and become (or continue being) the storyteller. A player may be required to draw extra Storytelling cards (for example, when they are the storyteller and are interrupted by another player who becomes the new storyteller, or if he or she hesitates for too long while telling the story). If the storyteller ends the story with the ending on their Happy Ever After card, and is out of cards, he or she wins. Players are expected to cooperate (to some extent) in order to avoid contradictions in the story as it develops, for the story to make sense, and (according to the rulebook) that any ending to the story is "satisfying".

== Publication history ==
Richard Lambert created the concept of the game, and together with James Wallis and Andrew Rilstone, developed Once Upon a Time in 1990. It was finally published by Atlas Games in 1994. A second edition was published in December 1995. The current third edition was released in October 2012.

Expansions contain 55 additional cards. Second edition expansions include:

- Dark Tales, dark story elements, released May 2004
- Create-Your-Own Storytelling Cards, blank cards, released June 2004

Third edition expansions include:

- Create-Your-Own Storytelling Cards, blank cards, released October 2012
- Enchanting Tales, prince and princess elements, released April 2013
- Seafaring Tales, aquatic elements, released August 2013
- Knightly Tales, medieval elements, released March 2014
- Animal Tales, animal elements, released May 2016
- Fairy Tales, fairy tale elements, released October 2016
- Fairytale Mashups, fairy tale elements, released November 2019

The third edition also has a Writer's Handbook available, in trade paperback format. It was published by Atlas Games in January 2013.

== Reception ==
Writing for the British games magazine Arcane, Zy Nicholson commented that "Although I'm well aware that the first edition (now sold out) did receive some rave reviews, I'm going to award this a respectable but cautious score." He concluded by giving it an average overall rating of 7 out of 10.

Spike Y. Jones reviewed Once Upon a Time for Pyramid #6 (March/April, 1994) and stated that "The rules are simple enough that children and grandparents can all play at the same time, and the game is so engrossing that even people who look down on your roleplaying activities would be willing to join you in a bit of this sort of storytelling. Whether you're buying Once Upon A Time for yourself, or to give to a gaming friend or non-gaming relative, this is one card game which won't sit on a shelf gathering dust." Commenting on the second edition for Pyramid #18, reviewer Derek Pearcy said the game "is a brilliant example of what we should be getting in this new game market" and "not only is this game easy to learn, not only is it fast, fun, and an Idea Whose Time Has Come, but ... girls think it rocks" commenting upon "the occasional insulting lip-service [many game companies have paid] to their female readership."

In 1999 Pyramid magazine named Once Upon a Time one of The Millennium's Best Card Games and also as one of The Millennium's Most Underrated Games. Editor Scott Haring stated "the game's just as good for kids as it is for adults."

Once Upon a Time was chosen for inclusion in the 2007 book Hobby Games: The 100 Best. British author and game designer Marc Gascoigne explained that Once Upon a Time is "one of the best ways I ever found to grab a non-gamer by their imagination and fling them into our world".

The third edition was featured on the web series Tabletop with Wil Wheaton in 2013, and its cover art also appeared in the 2013 book Spectrum 20: The Best in Contemporary Fantastic Art.

In his 2023 book Monsters, Aliens, and Holes in the Ground, RPG historian Stu Horvath noted, "The game is straightforward, charming, plays fast, and, because almost everyone is famialir with fairy tales, it is welcoming to players of all experience levels." Horvath did note that a major problem was the issue of "stage fright, but commented, "the cards mitigate storytelling paralysis by guiding players to the words they need to use."

== Awards ==
- Games included Once Upon a Time's Second edition in the magazine's Best Family Card Game section's 1997 Games 100 list.
- In 2013 the third edition of the game received the Tillywig Best Family Fun Award and was recommended for the Parents' Choice Award.
- At the 2013 Origins Award Once Upon a Time was a finalist in the "Children's, Family, or Party Game" category.

== Other reviews and commentary ==
- Shadis #27 (May, 1996)
- Casus Belli #84 p24 (Dec 1994)

== See also ==
- The Extraordinary Adventures of Baron Munchausen - Another story-telling game, also designed by James Wallis.
