= Interactive Fantasy =

Roleplaying game magazine

- Issue 1, titled Inter*Action
- Categories: Roleplaying games
- Publisher: Crashing Boar Books; Hogshead Publishing
- Founded: 1994
- First issue: 1994; 32 years ago
- Final issue Number: 1995; 4
- Country: United Kingdom
- Based in: London, UK
- Language: English

Interactive Fantasy is a magazine was published in England by Hogshead Publishing that focused on role-playing games, especially game theory.

== Publication history ==
Paul Mason, in his paper In Search of Self: A Survey of the First 25 Years of Anglo-American Role-Playing Game Theory, maintained that in the 25 years following the publication of Dungeons & Dragons (1974) and the subsequent rise of role-playing games, discussion of the theory of role-playing and storytelling had been largely absent: "Most of the writing on role-playing appeared in ephemeral publications with very low print runs. As a result the ideas were only weakly disseminated. As new magazines emerged, the same ideas (particularly 'realism and playability') were continually gone over. For many it felt like the hobby was marching on the spot."

In 1994, James Wallis and Andrew Rilstone set out to change that, co-founding what Wallis described as "a serious magazine about games design and storytelling systems." With Wallis as publisher and Rilstone as editor, they produced the first issue of a magazine titled Inter*action. As Mason noted, the magazine immediately had to be retitled "following legal threats from a computer games company." The second issue, called Interactive Fantasy: The Journal of Role-Playing and Story-Making Systems, was published in November 1994 by Hogshead Publishing, a London-based company that Wallis and Rilstone had formed.

Contributors included Greg Porter, Robin Laws, Pete Tamlyn, Brian Duguid, Jonathan Tweet, Greg Stafford, Allen Varney, and Greg Costikyan, and articles in the magazine — especially Costikyan's essay "I have no words and I must design" — were frequently cited in scholarly papers.

However, the enterprise was based on a "poorly thought out business model", and it almost immediately ran into financial difficulties. After only four issues, the magazine ceased publication.

== Reception ==
Phil Brucato reviewed the first issue of Inter*Action in White Wolf Inphobia #51 (Jan. 1995), rating it a 3.5 out of 5 and stated that "There's a lot of good stuff in the first issue of Inter*Action, but its [...] price tag is hefty. The magazine's few ads can't do much to defray Crashing Boar's costs. Inter*Action is well done, and I look forward to the next issue, but only time (and national economies) will tell whether this digest survives to reach the audience and acclaim it deserves."

Game historian Shannon Appelcline noted that the magazine "immediately received some good attention because of its thoughtful and analytical coverage of roleplaying." In the September 1995 edition of Dragon (#221), Rick Swan commented that "the high-gloss Interactive Fantasy aims for the eggheads." He concluded that the magazine was worth a read, given that "The lengthy reviews, despite their verbosity [...] are usually more interesting than the games themselves."
