= Terror of the Lichemaster =

Board game

- Cover art by Ian Miller
- Designers: Rick Priestley
- Publishers: Games Workshop
- Publication: 1986; 39 years ago
- Series: Warhammer

Terror of the Lichemaster is a board game published by Games Workshop in 1986 as a mini-campaign for Warhammer Fantasy Battle. Games Workshop also offered related metal miniatures that could be purchased for use with the scenarios.

== Gameplay ==
Terror of the Lichemaster is a supplement which consists of a selection of 16 cardstock buildings, as well as a campaign of three linked Warhammer scenarios introducing the character Heinrich Kemler as an undead lich. Kemler would return as the players' nemesis in many more Warhammer products. Cardboard cutouts for the various non-player characters are also included, although the gamemaster could substitute separately purchased metal miniatures offered by Games Workshop. Background information about the setting of the Frugelhorm Valley, Gimbrin's Mine, Bogels Farm and Frugelhofen Village is also included.

== Publication history ==
Terror of the Lichemaster was designed by Rick Priestley as a mini-campaign for the second edition of Warhammer Fantasy Battle. Cover art was by Ian Miller, artwork on the rule booklet was by Gary Chalk, and the cardstock buildings were designed by Dave Andrews.

Terror of the Lichemaster was followed by a sequel, Vengeance of the Lichemaster.

== Reception ==
Richard Vicary reviewed Terror of the Lichemaster for White Dwarf #75, giving it an overall rating of 9 out of 10, and stated that "Terror of the Lichemaster is a solid product for Warhammer players. The finish is presentable, and, with a little intelligent modelling, can be brought up to a very high standard indeed."
