= Heroes for Wargames =

1986 book about fantasy miniatures

Heroes for Wargames is a book about metal fantasy miniatures published by Paper Tiger Books in 1986.

== Contents ==
Heroes for Wargames, subtitled "Painting & Collecting Miniature Figures for Role Playing Games", is a 128-page large-format paperback about painting and collecting miniature fantasy figures, featuring many illustrations of painted and unpainted Citadel Miniatures. The book was written by Stewart Parkinson, with contributions by noted artists Kevin Adams and John Blanche. Contents include:

- an introduction to fantasy role-playing
- collecting and displaying painted miniatures
- a step-by-step guide to painting miniatures
- building dioramas

== Reception ==
In the May 1987 edition of White Dwarf (Issue #89), Mike Brunton stated that "This may not be the ultimate book on figure painting, but it'll do until the ultimate book turns up. Heroes For Wargames is probably ideal as a way of interesting someone in figures."

In the June 1987 edition of Dragon (Issue #122), John Bunnell thought this book suffered from a number of limitations. He found the early chapters seemed to be written for someone new to the hobby, but later chapters seemed to imply the reader was an enthusiast. Bunnell, an American, found "a distinctly English sense of punctuation that sounds awkward to American ears." Bunnell also criticized the book's lack of organization, noting that illustrations were often several pages away from the accompanying text. Despites its flaws, he concluded that, "This should not imply that Heroes for Wargames isn’t useful on its own terms. Readers new to the world of miniatures may learn more than they want or need to know, and experienced artists may find some of Parkinson’s comments painfully obvious. But, while the book may be most valuable to gamers who want to refine self-taught painting skills, nearly any figure fancier should find something of interest within its pages."
