= Phil Gallagher (game designer) =

Role-playing game designer

- Occupation: Game designer

Phil Gallagher is a game designer who has worked primarily on role-playing games, and a mathematician.

== Career ==
Phil Gallagher worked for the UK publisher Games Workshop. His early work included the TSR (UK) magazine Imagine, which ran from 1983 to 1986. When the magazine folded, Gallagher was transferred to working on Warhammer Fantasy Roleplay. Games Workshop was looking for a company interested in a license to Warhammer Fantasy Roleplay, so James Wallis of Hogshead Publishing called Gallagher and obtained the license. Gallagher's work included a spell from 2001 to 2005 as Chief HR Officer for Games Workshop US.

His D&D design work includes When a Star Falls (1984), Blade of Vengeance (1984), Where Chaos Reigns (1985), Dark Clouds Gather (1985), and Night's Dark Terror (1986).

His Games Workshop publications (co-written from 1986 to 1989, mostly with Graeme Davis and Jim Bambra) include Warhammer Fantasy Roleplay, The Enemy Within, Shadows Over Bogenhafen, and Death on the Reik.

Gallagher began teaching mathematics at Stevenson University in 2007, first as an adjunct and then, from 2022, as a lecturer.
