= Zweihänder (role-playing game) =

Tabletop fantasy role-playing game

Grim & Perilous RPG
- Revised Core Rulebook
- Designers: Daniel D. Fox
- Publishers: Grim & Perilous Studios; Andrews McMeel Publishing; World of Game Design; SLLSWRD Games
- Publication: 2017; 9 years ago
- Genres: Fantasy
- Systems: Custom / Percentile
- Website: Zweihänder Grim & Perilous RPG
- ISBN: 9781524851668

Zweihänder Grim & Perilous RPG or Zweihänder is a 2017 dark fantasy tabletop role-playing game designed by Daniel D. Fox. Zweihänder won two gold ENNIE Awards. Zweihänder was designed for unusually punishing combat.

== Publication history ==
Zweihänder was first published by Grim & Perilous Studios in 2017 following a Kickstarter project that raised $61,743. In 2019, Andrews McMeel Publishing took over publication. However, this partnership ended during the COVID-19 lockdowns due to increased printing costs. The game was acquired by World of Game Design, who raised $166,813 on Kickstarter in 2024 for the Zweihander Reforged Edition.

== System ==
Zweihänder uses percentile dice to resolve players' and gamemasters' choices. In its combat system, most human-level creatures and characters can suffer only two or three successful attacks before receiving an injury that can instantly maim or kill. Zweihänder has no powers for regeneration or resurrection, and it offers limited options for healing to players. "Fate Points" represent the fate or destiny of a character, and provide some limited opportunities to avoid deadly outcomes. "Fortune Points" help a character avoid certain perilous situations. In an article for The Escapist, Fox explained:

In Zweihander there are real consequences for failing dice rolls, and we often like to joke that “naps don’t heal stab wounds.” The choices you make for your character...will change your character in a way that alters their psyche, outlook, and values, both mechanically and narratively.

=== Professions ===
Characters advance by entering a series of professions that provide access to a series of new or improved skills and bonuses to primary attributes. The profession system reflects the late medieval/early Renaissance setting of the game and gives an idea of what a character might have been doing either before or during their adventures (such as a preacher, coachman, courtier, inquisitor, merchant lord, rat catcher or sellsword).

== Awards ==
In 2018, Zweihänder won the Gold ENnies awards for Best Game and Product of the Year at Gen Con.

== Supplements ==
- Zweihänder Grim & Perilous RPG, Revised Core Rulebook by Daniel Fox, Andrews McMeel Publishing 2019. ISBN 9781524851668
- Main Gauche, Grim & Perilous Supplement by Daniel Fox, Andrews McMeel Publishing 2019. ISBN 9781524851675
- Zweihänder Grim & Perilous RPG, Player's Handbook by Daniel Fox, Andrews McMeel Publishing 2019. ISBN 9781524855444
- Flames of Freedom, Grim & Perilous RPG by Richard Iorio, Daniel Fox, Dejan Mandic, Ken Duquet, Anna Goldberg, Adam Rose, Elijah Forbes, Gabe Hicks, James Introcaso, Kate Bullock, Sean Van Damme, Tanya DePass, Tanner Yea, TK Johnson, Walt Ciechanowski, Andrews McMeel Publishing 2021. ISBN 9781524862510
- Dark Astral, Grim & Perilous Chapbook by Daniel Fox, Andrews McMeel Publishing 2020. ISBN 1524858730
- Zweihänder Grim & Perilous RPG, Character's Folio by Daniel Fox, Andrews McMeel Publishing 2020. ISBN 1524858757
- Zweihänder Grim & Perilous RPG, Gamemaster's Folio by Daniel Fox, Andrews McMeel Publishing 2019. ISBN 1524858773
- Zweihänder Grim & Perilous RPG, Arcane Magick Cards by Daniel Fox, Andrews McMeel Publishing 2018. ISBN 978-0-9983523-3-6
- Zweihänder Grim & Perilous RPG, Covenant Magick Cards by Daniel Fox, Andrews McMeel Publishing 2017.
- Zweihänder Grim & Perilous RPG, Divine Magick Cards by Daniel Fox, Andrews McMeel Publishing 2018. ISBN 978-0-9983523-2-9
- Zweihänder Grim & Perilous RPG, Gamemaster Screen by Daniel Fox, Andrews McMeel Publishing 2017. ISBN 978-0-9983523-1-2
- Zweihänder Grim & Perilous RPG, Injury & Mishap Cards by Daniel Fox, Andrews McMeel Publishing 2018.
- Zweihänder Grim & Perilous RPG, Monster Cards by Daniel Fox, Andrews McMeel Publishing 2018. ISBN 978-0-9983523-4-3
