= Death on the Reik =

Role-playing game supplement

Death on the Reik is a supplement published by Games Workshop in 1987 as the third installment of The Enemy Within Campaign created for the fantasy role-playing game Warhammer Fantasy Roleplay.

== Description ==
Death on the Reik is the third part of The Enemy Within campaign, and picks up where the previous supplement, Shadows over Bogenhafen, ends. The characters become river traders on the River Reik, the largest waterway in the Empire, and must interact with various encounters such as pirates and mutants in order to follow the thread of the campaign adventure. As critic Paul Pettengale noted, "the main thrust of the plot here involves a piece of Warpstone that crashed to the ground from the skies over 100 years ago, and the attempts that a band of Skaven are making to recover it."

== Publication history ==
The six-part campaign The Enemy Within, designed for the fantasy role-playing game Warhammer Fantasy Roleplay, was published between 1986 and 1989. The third installment, Death on the Reik, was written by Phil Gallagher, Jim Bambra, and Graeme Davis, with cover art and illustrations by Martin McKenna and Ian Miller, and cartography by Charles Elliot. It was released in 1987 as a boxed set containing an 88-page adventure book, a 20-page rules supplement, 20 pages of player hand-outs, a map of the area and a map of Reikland Castle.

Games Workshop republished the first three parts of The Enemy Within in 1989 as Warhammer Adventure.

In 1995, Hogshead Publishing acquired the license to Warhammer Fantasy Roleplay and published an updated version of the series as a series of softcover books.

In 2017, Cubicle 7 acquired the license for Warhammer Fantasy Roleplay, and in 2019, began publishing a Director's Cut of the campaign for the fourth edition of the game, including a new edition of Death on the Reik, which was accompanied by a separate companion volume with additional bonus material.

== Reception ==
In the July–August 1988 edition of Space Gamer/Fantasy Gamer (Issue No. 82), Richard A. Edwards had high praise for Death on the Reik, commenting that, "Those Game Masters who want a well done town for use in their own campaign could certainly use the information provided ... The graphical presentation of this series is amazing. The detailed castle map is useable in any gaming situation which could require one and the river material is likewise useable in other systems. But the real value of this package is as part of the continuing saga of The Enemy Within."

In the September 1987 issue of White Dwarf, Phil Gallagher noted the "variety of locations throughout the Reikland, with numerous sub-plots and motivations for the GM to use as prods when necessary." Gallagher concluded that the end of the adventure, "should provide more than a few tense moments for the players, not to mention a shock or two."

Stewart Wieck reviewed Death on the Reik in White Wolf #9 (1988), rating it a 9 out of 10 and stated that "The Enemy Within, Shadows Over Bogenhafen, and Death on the Reik are all very attractive and worthwhile supplements."

In Issue 3 of the Finnish magazine Sininen Lohikäärme, Harri Heinonen thought that this supplement was "Worth the price, and was chosen as the best adventure in 1987." Henonen also noted that Death on the Reik "comes with a lot of additional material."

In Issue 15 of the British games magazine Arcane, Paul Pettengale reviewed the Hogshead edition of Death on the Reik and was impressed, commenting "The level of detail of which Death on the Reik can boast is impressive - even if the player characters pick up on just half of it, they're going to be able to appreciate that this is a finely-crafted adventure. The depth of the plot, the characters which are there to be met, and the glorious locations make this one of the finest adventures you're ever likely to run or play - rarely are scenarios that you buy as good as the ones you write yourself, but in this instance, you're going to be awestruck by the sheer quality of what's been put together." Pettengale concluded by giving Death on the Reik an excellent rating of 9 out of 10.
