= Ian Miller (illustrator) =

British fantasy illustrator and writer (born 1946)

- Born: Ian Miller; 11 November 1946 (age 79)
- Education: Northwich School of Art, Saint Martin's School of Art
- Known for: Illustration, sculpture, film design
- Movement: Fantasy, horror, science fiction
- Website: Official website

Ian Miller (born 11 November 1946) is a British fantasy illustrator and writer best known for his quirkily etched gothic style and macabre sensibility, and noted for his book and magazine cover and interior illustrations, including covers for books by H. P. Lovecraft and contributions to David Day's Tolkien-inspired compendiums, work for Fighting Fantasy gamebooks and various role-playing and wargaming publications, as well as contributions to the Ralph Bakshi films Wizards and Cool World.

== Early life ==
Miller was born in 1946, and raised predominantly in London and Manchester. His mother, who encouraged the artistic vocation, was a theatrical milliner for one of the leading costumiers to the film industry, which, with cinema, he cites as an early inspiration:

My interest in the story-telling process and the world of make-believe was greatly enhanced by my mother's involvement in the theatre and motion-picture industry. I enjoyed a vivid and well-stocked childhood. Vivid because my mother took me to the cinema every Saturday afternoon, and well-stocked because I owned a toy box, full to overflowing with theatrical props and clothing from an array of theatre and film productions [...]

As a child Miller experimented with coloured pencils and poster paints producing images of Ancient Egyptians during something he refers to as his 'Ancient Egyptian Phase', followed later by an obsession with cowboys and Indians. At the age of nine Miller attended Mortbane Academy for Boys in Inverness-shire, Scotland, where he recalls regular painting expeditions to the surrounding countryside under the tutelage of the art master, nicknamed 'Old Dribble'. Between 1964 and 1967 he enrolled at Northwich School of Art, before embarking on a degree at Saint Martin's School of Art in London, where he began in sculpture before switching to painting, and graduating with honours in 1970. Shortly after this he was taken on by an agent and began working in London as a professional illustrator.

== Career ==
Miller's earliest work included magazine and book jacket illustrations, including a host of illustrations for paperback titles by H. P. Lovecraft, and work for Men Only and Club International.

In 1975 and 1976 whilst Miller was staying in San Francisco, he was approached by Ralph Bakshi and invited to contribute to the film Wizards. Miller relocated to Los Angeles and worked on the animated movie, later citing it as an experience that left a profound impression upon him. He later went on to work on Bakshi's film Cool World in the 1980s, produce pre-production work for the film Shrek in the 1990s, and contribute designs and illustrations to the 2005 film MirrorMask.

Death on the Reik, which featured as the cover of the Warhammer Fantasy Roleplay campaign instalment of the same name, and exhibiting Miller's line and wash method, restricted use of colour and the 'gnarled trees' Patrick Woodroffe refers to below.

Miller is well known for his work for the Fighting Fantasy gamebooks which rose to popularity in the mid-1980s, providing covers for early titles in the series like The Citadel of Chaos, House of Hell and Creature of Havoc. He has also contributed to the Games Workshop-published fantasy gaming periodical White Dwarf in which he was featured in an Illuminations exposé in issue 86, and provided numerous illustrations for various role-playing and war gaming books and supplements published by Games Workshop during the latter half of the 1980s, including the covers for Terror of the Lichemaster, Death on the Reik and Warhammer City for Warhammer, and a host of illustrations for the Realm of Chaos supplement and the first edition of Warhammer 40,000. In the following decades Miller went on to provide further illustrations for gaming lines published by other companies, including the Everway, Shadowrun, and Earthdawn RPGs.

Miller has illustrated cards for the Magic: The Gathering and Sorcery: Contested Realm collectible card games.

Miller is also noted for his Tolkien-inspired illustrations, and contributed to the lavishly illustrated A Tolkien Bestiary and Characters from Tolkien – A Bestiary, and has provided illustrations for British science fiction periodical Interzone and cover and interior images for SF titles like Alien Stories 2 by Dennis Pepper.

A number of anthologies of Miller's work have been published over the years. His first, with James Slattery, The Green Dog Trumpet and Other Stories, was published by Dragon's Dream in 1979, and was followed by another, Secret Art, and a third, entitled Ratspike, co-authored with fellow illustrator and Games Workshop art director John Blanche and published by GW Books. Miller has also produced imagery for two graphic novels, the first, The Luck in the Head, with writer M. John Harrison and a second with James Herbert called The City, as well as working on an unpublished third called Suzie Pellet.

Miller has exhibited frequently during his career in both solo shows and group exhibitions in Britain and internationally.

Current projects include the production of a series of black and white panel drawings called Corpus Pandemonium, and a book called The Broken Novel, a reworked film project called The Confessions of Carrie Sphagnum, a set of Tarot cards, and a theatre project entitled The Shingle Dance.

== Style and technique ==
Miller's style is variously described as surreal, gothic and nightmarish or grotesque. "Edgy and surreal, Miller combines intelligent geometric exactness with a messy, fluid sense of what it means to be human." As fellow contemporary illustrator Patrick Woodroffe comments in the introduction to Blanche and Miller's Ratspike:

[...] Sometimes Ian made me see the world differently. I couldn't look at a pylon or a rocking horse or a gnarled tree without being reminded of Ian's drawings [...] He is an excellent artist, which is by the way only marginally a matter of technique. There is nothing of the copyist about Ian Miller. I doubt very much that he uses reference material of any kind.

An illustration from Miller's Hollywood Gothic series, combining forms derived from fish and mechanical elements.

According to Miller, his illustrations have a tendency to the 'frontalistic', and are also noted to often feature recurrent elements inspired by fishes, flies and robotic forms, and the gnarled haunting trees which he claims originated in an attempt to cover failures of draughtsmanship. Says Miller of his work:

My images are the stuff of dreams and apparitions, the tremors that touch the skirt of day. Unspoken thoughts, stored memories, drawn up to be aired and then twisted by fancy.

Miller cites amongst his principal artistic influences Albrecht Dürer and Leonardo da Vinci, the German Expressionists and French Impressionists, as well as an early predilection for Japanese landscape artists. Other sources include the formative influence of writer Alfred Bester, and a love for the Flash Gordon RKO Radio serials, and his early exposure to the cinematic medium in general which he feels lent a narrative quality to his work, as well as, of course, the every day world itself:

Rust, falling facades, tottering buttresses, and an overriding sense of impermanence, these are the things which fascinate me the most. [...] My early exposure to the cinematic medium had a pronounced effect on the way I perceive and construct my imagery. I see in terms of still images from a film [...] Everything I draw is part of an episodic sequence. [...] In truth, inspiration is just about everywhere you choose to look. It's all mixed up in non-artistic things in day-to-day interactions and boring interludes. It's a huge mess of pottage spiked with grit but if you're persistent you'll always find the meat.

Miller has experimented with various media during his career, but has a preference for pencils, technical pens, watercolour, and charcoal. "I found self-expression with the pen – with oils it was quite the opposite." He also occasionally combines collage and photography into his pieces. His best-known published work has tended to be characterised by a trademark pen-and-ink and wash technique executed on line board and which he refers to as his 'Tight Pen Style', emphasising line detail and a restricted use of colour, something he views as a result of both short-sightedness and Northern European proclivities:

Although short-sightedness must have influenced my close-worked pen style I think it is also true to say that this obsessional regard for surface details is very much in keeping with the Northern European Art traditions. [...] [In Northern Europe] the emphasis revolved more around temporal scenes and a concern for mood and things observed close in. [...] It is also to do with the collective mind and racial memories, which touch at the roots of each successive generation.
