= Pádraig Murphy =

Irish diplomat

Pádraig Murphy is a former Irish diplomat.

Murphy was born in Cork. He received a BA from UCC and an MA from Sheffield University.

In the Irish Department of Foreign Affairs and Trade he served as Ambassador to the USSR and Finland (1981-85), as Political Director of the department, (1985-91), Ambassador to the Federal Republic of Germany (1991-98), to Spain (1998-2001) and to Japan (2001-2005). He retired in 2005.

In 2012 he served as the OSCE Chairmanship's Special Representative for the South Caucasus.

Murphy chairs the Foreign Policy Group of the IIEA and is a member of its Germany Group.

He is a regular contributor to the Dublin Review of Books.
