= James Wallis (games designer) =

British role-playing game designer

James Hugh Wallis (born October 1966) is a British designer and publisher of tabletop and role-playing games.

== Career ==
James Wallis began roleplaying in 1981 through Dungeons & Dragons and Traveller, which were both licensed in the UK by Games Workshop at the time. Wallis began self-publishing fanzines, starting with WEREMAN and then Sound & Fury, and got to know game designer Erick Wujcik thanks to the latter; Wallis met Kevin Siembieda through Wujcik at Gen Con 22 in 1989, resulting in Wallis writing Mutants in Avalon (1990) and Mutants in Orbit (1992) for Palladium Books. Wallis also began developing his own role-playing game based on the Bugtown comics, and in 1992 he brought the game to Wujcik at Phage Press, where it went nowhere for two years and remained unpublished due to creative differences. Once Upon a Time, a game designed by James Wallis, Andrew Rilstone and Richard Lambert, was published by Atlas Games in 1993, where Wallis met Jonathan Tweet, who soon became head of role-playing games at Wizards of the Coast; Wallis brought his Bugtown game to Wizards, but cartoonist Matt Howarth was unable to agree with Wizards of the Coast regarding royalties so they did not publish the game either. Walls co-founded the RPG magazine Inter*action with Andrew Rilstone, the first issue of which was published in Summer 1994.

In October 1994, Wallis founded Hogshead Publishing, a company which specialised in role-playing and storytelling games. Wallis based the company in the UK, and got a license from Phil Gallagher at Games Workshop to publish books for Warhammer Fantasy Roleplay. Wallis and Rilstone changed the name of Inter*action to Interactive Fantasy to resolve trademark concerns beginning with its second issue, which was also the first publication by Hogshead; the magazine only lasted two more issues after that. Warhammer sold well, but Hogshead had problems with their distributor, and Wallis had to lay off the entire staff of Hogshead. Matt Howarth eventually pulled the license for Bugtown from Wallis, and the game was never published. By 1996, Wallis had also begun working in the computer industry and soon after he went into magazine publishing, working on Warhammer on evenings and weekends. By late 1997, there was an improvement in cashflow so Wallis moved the company from his spare bedroom to sharing an office with ProFantasy Software, and hired Matthew Pook. Wallis was able to publish his game The Extraordinary Adventures of Baron Munchausen in 1998. He helped the principals of ProFantasy Software resurrect the Dragonmeet convention in 2000.

Wallis announced on 26 November 2002 that he was ending Hogshead Publishing, and Mark Ricketts bought the company name in February 2003. Wallis started the company Magnum Opus Press in 2007 by obtaining licensing for the Dragon Warriors role-playing game; Magnum Opus Press published a new Dragon Warriors 1.1 edition with supplements starting in 2008 before problems with the licensor ended publication on 1 April 2011. Wallis released more books through Magnum Opus, including the debut novel Game Night (2007) by Jonny Nexus, and a new edition of The Extraordinary Adventures of Baron Munchausen (2008).

Wallis is a narrative media consultant, creating online games for clients including the BBC, the U.K. Home Office, and Endemol Television. He lives in London with his wife and children.

He has also created games and books for other publishers, including the award-winning card game Once Upon A Time, which he co-authored with Richard Lambert and Andrew Rilstone. In 2001, he founded the annual Diana Jones Award for "excellence in gaming". He currently runs the gaming consultancy Spaaace, which includes the publishing subsidiary Magnum Opus Press, and included his personal blog, Cope.

In January 2013 Wallis launched a Kickstarter for a RPG called Alas Vegas. A PDF download was released to backers in December 2016, and the physical book was published in November 2017.

== Games ==
James Wallis's published games include:

- Once Upon A Time, co-authored with Richard Lambert and Andrew Rilstone (first released in 1994; named as winner of Games magazine's Best Family Card Game section in the 1997 Games 100 list and one of "The Millennium's Best Card Games" by Pyramid magazine)
- The Extraordinary Adventures of Baron Munchausen (first released in 1998, revised and expanded in 2008; named as one of "The Millennium's Best Games" by Pyramid magazine, nominated for the 2009 Origins Award for "Best Children's, Family or Party Game")

Games he has edited and/or published include:

- Nobilis (second edition, 2002; winner of the Origins Award for "Best Graphic Presentation Book Format Product", 2002)

== Writing and periodicals ==
In 1994 he founded and published Interactive Fantasy (IF), an early journal of 'games design and criticism'. The editor was Andrew Rilstone. The second issue included the first printing of the essay 'I Have No Words And I Must Design' by Greg Costikyan. He wrote for the British Sunday Times newspaper from 2000 to 2001. He also co-wrote scripts for the television show 404 Not Found.

On October 17, 2023, Wallis released an enhanced audio edition of Everybody Wins in collaboration with Recorded Books, further establishing his prominence in board game culture and design. The book examines the transformative impact of tabletop gaming over the past 45 years, providing insights for enthusiasts, newcomers, and those seeking game recommendations.
