= The Extraordinary Adventures of Baron Munchausen =

Role-playing game by James Wallis

A Roleplaying Game in a New Style
- Third edition cover published by Fantasy Flight Games, 2016
- Designers: James Wallis
- Publishers: Hogshead Publishing 1998; Magnum Opus Press 2008; Fantasy Flight Games 2016
- Publication: 1998; 28 years ago
- Genres: Fantasy
- Systems: Free-form, minimal, wagering

The Extraordinary Adventures of Baron Munchausen is a tabletop role-playing game published by Hogshead Publishing in 1998 that is based on the fictional character Baron Munchausen.

== Description ==
The Extraordinary Adventures of Baron Munchausen is a multi-player storytelling/tabletop role-playing game based on stories about Baron Munchausen. The book, illustrated with artwork by Gustave Doré, begins with a preface supposedly written by the grandfather of game creator James Wallis, who apparently had learned the rules of the game directly from Baron Munchausen. The next 14 pages outline the rules and optional rules, with examples of play. The rules are then summarized in half a page. An appendix lists a hundred single-sentence story starters.

=== Set-up ===
Players are seated around a table. Each has a purse in front of them that contains a number of coins equal to the number of players.

=== Gameplay ===
Play begins with one player adding a coin to the center of the table — in game terms, this is "buying the table another round" —and saying to the player to their right, "So Baron, tell us the story of the time _____", filling in the blank with a completely absurd story idea. Game historian Stu Horvath uses the example "tell us the story of the time you fed the entire city of Luxembourg with bacon from a single pig." The storyteller then creates a five-minute narrative larded with highly far-fetched, implausible and difficult to believe events, finishing the story with a vow of truthfulness.

During this storytelling, another player can add further complications by placing one of their coins in the center of the table and offering a suggestion to take the story in a new direction. Stu Horvath uses the example "But Baron, wherever did you find a frying pan the size of Versailles?" The storyteller can either accept the coin and add the suggestion into their story, or refuse the coin, insulting the questioner. If the coin is refused, the questioner can raise the stakes by adding another coin, take back their coin and drop the idea, or challenge the storyteller to a duel for the insult, with the winner taking all of the coins in the center of the table as a prize.

Once the storyteller is finished, they collect the coins in the center of the table, "buy the next round" with a coin and make a story suggestion to the player on their right, continuing the game. Players can beg off telling a story by buying a round.

Once everyone has had a chance to tell a story, players give all their coins to the player they feel told the best story. The player that collects the most coins is declared the winner of that round of play. Coins are equally redistributed, and the winner starts the next round of play by using a coin to buy a round and giving a story suggestion to the player on their right.

The rules instruct players that each subsequent story should out-do the previous story.

== Publication history ==
James Wallis created The Extraordinary Adventures of Baron Munchausen, which was published by Hogshead Publishing in 1998 as a 24-page booklet. It was the first of what would later be called the "New Style" RPGs.

In 2008, a second edition was published by Magnum Opus Press. The first 1000 copies, called Gentleman's Edition, came out in a hardback deluxe format with a black leather effect cover with gold embossing; the rest of the print was published in softcover and was called the Wives' and Servants' Edition.

A digital version, called the Difference Engine Number 3 Edition was available exclusively from E23, the digital store of Steve Jackson Games, and DriveThruRPG. All three editions are the same, except for one illustration which is only present in the Gentleman's Edition.

The Wives' and Servants' Edition was reprinted in 2013.

In 2016, Fantasy Flight Games released a new, third edition of the book in full color and with all-new artwork. ISBN 978-1-63344-280-1

== Reception ==
The reviewer from the online second volume of Pyramid stated that "I should tell you up front that this role-playing game sort of isn't. I mean, you're playing a role, all right. At least one, that of a gentleman [...] of the eighteenth century telling tall stories to his peers, among whom is (in spirit if not flesh) the Baron Munchausen. In the course of that story, you may find yourself playing yet another role, one that a too-stringent regard for the letter of the truth oft miscalled "Gospel" might prevent you from playing with quite the verve and elan that the potent spirits coursing through your veins demand. In short, you win drinks by lying well. You can already tell why writers love this game."

In his 2023 book Monsters, Aliens, and Holes in the Ground, RPG historian Stu Horvath noted that this game was possibly "the most minimal set of rules to see release" up that point in time, but pointed out "While it is a fairly simple game, Munchausen demands much of its players for all its simplicity. They must be able to improvise wildly, often at the drop of a dime (literally, thanks to the wagering system), while injecting ever more absurdity." Horvath warned, "a sort of paralysis can set in, or worse, apathy, both of which are more likely the responses of players with long histories of traditional role-playing." Horvath pointed out that this game was the start of the story-telling movement in the role-playing game world, saying "Many of these ideas and conventions are taken further in the next decade by games like Sorcerer, Universalis, and the broader indie/storygame movement."
