= John Blanche =

British illustrator and modeller (1948–2026)

- Born: 26 October 1948; England
- Died: 1 June 2026 (aged 77)
- Known for: Illustration; modelling; miniature painting
- Style: Fantasy; science fiction
- Awards: Master Painter, Games Day 1987

John Blanche (26 October 1948 – 1 June 2026) was a British fantasy and science fiction illustrator and modeller who worked on Games Workshop's White Dwarf magazine, Warhammer Fantasy Battle, Warhammer Fantasy Roleplay, Warhammer 40,000 and Warhammer Age of Sigmar games and was the art director for the company and illustrated various game books and Fighting Fantasy publications.

== Early life ==
Blanche was born into a working-class family in post-war England on 26 October 1948. He grew up on a Council estate during the 1950s, a period he describes as 'grey and flat' and lacking in the visual richness available to modern youth. Instead he took early inspiration from cinema, his collections of toy soldiers, and producing drawings of historic warriors on the backs of old rolls of wallpaper.

During the 1960s Blanche was exposed to art and art movements, eventually attending art college, where he entered a course on the strength of his drawings and paintings of battle scenes and prehistoric conflicts, and where he recounts that he was told he "had a romantic spirit, but it would never earn me a living, so there was no point in doing it".

[...] The people there seemed unaware of art in all its heroic glory. . . people stood back and expected me to metamorphose into an existentialist of sorts. Well, I couldn't even spell that, so I drifted into graphics and became exposed to illustration, hippydom, and The Lord of the Rings. Even then, I was told never to invent for the sake of it and that I would never get a job painting pictures of angels, dragons, goblins and trolls.

After leaving college, Blanche spent time working as an assistant to a taxidermist in a Georgian manor-house, and worked on model building, drawing wildlife and painting fantastic scenes in his spare time.

== Career ==
Blanche's Chaos Minotaur with Mona Lisa banner conversion, which won him the Master Painter award at Games Day 1987.

After discovering published examples of fantasy art prevalent at the time, Blanche began preparing work for publication, eventually relocating to London and approaching artist and publisher Roger Dean -- Dean provided him with the opportunity for freelance illustration work, and Blanche subsequently spent the late 70s and early 80s producing book covers and interior illustrations, including five illustrations for David Day's compendium, A Tolkien Bestiary.

Also at around this time, during the late 1970s, Blanche became an avid collector of metal miniatures, and eventually of fantasy miniatures as these became available. In 1982 he worked on a range of miniatures with Asgard Miniatures.

In later years he would go on to contribute numerous articles to White Dwarf on the hobby, as well as contributing to and overseeing designs for miniatures. Several of his pieces were featured in the 1986 book Heroes for Wargames and he received the Master Painter award for one of his own miniature pieces at the UK Games Day convention in 1987.

=== Games Workshop ===
In 1977 Blanche became associated with Games Workshop, supplying the cover art for issue 4 of their gaming publication White Dwarf and producing the cover art for the first British edition of Dungeons & Dragons, for which the company possessed the UK licence, and in 1978 the magazine's first full-colour cover with issue 7. After 1979 he continued to produce work for the company, including further illustrations for the magazine and the box art for the first edition of Games Workshop's own Warhammer Fantasy Battle game in 1983.

After the company's move to Nottingham in 1986, Blanche was eventually made art director of Games Workshop through his acquaintance with new manager Bryan Ansell, directing the in-house art department, commissioning work from outside illustrators, and producing designs for Citadel Miniatures and artwork. He oversaw and contributed to regular art and miniature painting columns in White Dwarf for many years, as well as providing numerous illustrations for Games Workshop games, and, with other artists like Ian Miller and Adrian Smith, providing a formative contribution to the look of the company's core products.

In 1988 Blanche provided the cover for Nottingham thrash metal band Sabbat's album History of a Time to Come, which featured his piece Horned is the Hunter. (Note: White Dwarf issue 95 included the band's Warhammer-inspired single Blood for the Blood God as a flexi disc.)

He was also known for his illustrations for fantasy gamebooks, including the Fighting Fantasy series, for which he produced cover and interior illustrations for Jackson's Sorcery! quartet and accompanying spellbook.

Blanche had a number of books dedicated to his work published, including The Prince and the Woodcutter, and Ratspike with fellow illustrator Ian Miller.

Following a period of poor health, he focused more on working on sketchbooks relating to Warhammer and Warhammer 40,000, describing himself as "living in the worlds he has helped to create". Blanche officially retired from work at Games Workshop on 31 May 2023.

=== After Games Workshop ===
After his retirement, Blanche continued to work in the miniature wargames industry, licensing his name to a range of paints inspired by his style and launching Kickstarter campaigns for a range of models known as Mörderin and later a game, John Blanche's En Guarde.

== Style and technique ==
Blanche is known for the dark, gothic, occasionally bizarre, punkish quality of his artwork, and this is something that has carried across onto the Games Workshop game worlds he has helped to shape. His images are, in the words of Patrick Woodroffe, of a style which "has as yet no name, no easy access, no fixed criteria. [...] Is it packaging? Is it comic-book art? Where does it fit? Roleplaying games, and all the paraphernalia that go with them, must still be unfamiliar to the average citizen of this land."

The Sentinel, an example of Blanche's early line and wash technique and style. The image featured as the cover of White Dwarf 11 in 1979.

Blanche himself viewed his work as drawing on an archetypal core of inherited imagery:

The first images of primeval man would concern themselves with hunting scenes, heroic action, mighty beasts, death masks, war paint, fetishes and trophies. Today we see the same sorts of themes represented in punk haircuts, studded leather and even in the imagery employed in films like Bladerunner and Aliens. This is the heritage of Western culture, and that is what I am trying to tap when I paint.

— Ratspike

Early in his career Blanche was influenced by turn-of-the-century illustrators such as Arthur Rackham and Kay Nielsen, and his exposure to the fantasy genre through writers like J. R. R. Tolkien. Favourite artists have included Rembrandt, Bosch, Dürer, Grünewald, Shishkin, the Pre-Raphaelites, Friedrich, Géricault and Gérôme, and the Victorian romanticists, as well as contemporary illustrators such as Jim Burns and Patrick Woodroffe, and he also cites everything from other media like film and comics, to everyday people and the natural world as sources of inspiration. Blanche has often incorporated images from other artists into his own work, with the Mona Lisa featuring in several pieces, an act he describes as "no mere plagiarism, but a deliberate policy. . . to place what is probably the world's best known painted image into a new reality." Others of his works have included elements of paintings by David and Géricault.

Interpretation, for Blanche, is literal, with an absence of intended messages or secret meanings; images are to be enjoyed for what they are, and he aims to draw the viewer to an appreciation of technique, colour, atmosphere, relationship of shapes, dynamics and characters, and the narrative quality of the image. One painting in particular, however, entitled Amazonia Gothique, was something he cites as an effort to produce a deliberate comment:

[...] I was utterly sick of seeing brilliant artists producing painting after painting of near-naked fantasy females with chests the size of airships. . . Elements of this style of fantasy art were creeping onto the front of White Dwarf. . . I was receiving letters on a weekly basis, complaining about what people saw as exploitation of the female form.

The painting was used as the cover for White Dwarf 79, and later as a poster, and even formed the basis for a metal miniature, and went on to be voted best cover of the year in a magazine poll.

Blanche's early work tended to be executed using technical drawing pens combined with washes of water-colour, a technique that remained until the early 1980s, after which he began to utilise inks and acrylics instead, using what he describes as a 'fully-modelled painting technique' designed to mimic the oil painting methods of classical and romantic art. He has also, albeit very rarely, utilised oils. This glaze-based technique allows for undertones to shine through the overlaid colours giving the finished image an inner light effect, although this is predominantly lost in the reproduction process. Most of Blanche's paintings, with a few exceptions, are smaller than A4 in size. In executing work, he uses a variety of visual references ranging from friends posing for paintings, books, and collections of images from printed colour supplements. Each element of an image is constructed separately in a sketch pad, and planned on lay-out pads before being transferred to art board. This is then shaded in with a pencil and coloured using a limited selection of inks. Highlights and texture are added with white acrylic, and coloured washes and glazes are overlaid on top of this. Airbrushes are also used to fill in large areas like skies and to provide a smooth background for the image, and occasionally to add mists or atmosphere. Random elements are sometimes incorporated, the result of freely applied strokes, dripped pigment, and the use of the airbrush.

John's often tiny paintings are immaculate, painstakingly accurate, jewel-like in the intensity of repeatedly glazed colours. To be fully appreciated they must be seen as original for it is their small size that somehow emphasizes their uniqueness. [...] John's fondness for Latin slogans may seem out of place, and yet a glimpse of the originals makes one realise that such miniature work is not even one step removed from the work of the medieval illuminator. What throws us is the gods are different, or at least the devils are. This is very modern stuff. Different. Hard to assess.

— Patrick Woodroffe, introduction to Ratspike

== Death ==
Blanche died on 1 June 2026, at the age of 77.

== Works ==
- The Prince and the Woodcutter – with Henry Wolff, Paper Tiger, 1979
- Ratspike – with Ian Miller, 1989
- Inquis Exterminatus, Artbook, Black Library, 2000
- The Inquisitor Sketchbook, (ed Marc Gascoigne), Black Library, 2001
- Voodoo Forest – Hollow Press, 2022

== Sources ==
- Blanche, John; Miller, Ian (1989). Ratspike. Brighton: GW Books. ISBN 978-1-872372-00-6.
