= Martin McKenna (artist) =

British artist and illustrator (1969–2020)

- Born: Martin McKenna; 21 February 1969; London, England
- Died: September 2020 (aged 51)
- Known for: Fantasy art, illustration

Martin McKenna (21 February 1969 – September 2020) was a British artist and illustrator, known for his work in role-playing games, novels, and comics, mainly of horror and fantasy genres.

He illustrated many Games Workshop products in the 1980s, and his drawings were a key part of the visual identity of the first edition of Warhammer Fantasy Roleplay. When Games Workshop started its Warhammer fiction line in 1990, he provided internal art. He contributed to Fighting Fantasy books, Everway, Magic: The Gathering, video games (including Eidos Interactive, and film and television. He has illustrated books for numerous international publishers including Scholastic, Penguin Books, Oxford University Press, HarperCollins, Time-Warner, and Hodder & Stoughton, illustrating popular authors such as Anne McCaffrey, Raymond E. Feist and Harry Turtledove, as well as some classics including Dr Jekyll & Mr Hyde and The Silver Sword. He also wrote books about digital art, such as Digital Fantasy Painting Workshop and Digital Horror Art, and the children's picture books The Octopuppy and The Crocodolly.

== Early life and career ==
McKenna was born in London and as a child, he was inspired by "the things [he] found most frightening," including the gothic horror episodes of Doctor Who and Hammer and Universal horror movies. In 1985 at the age of 16, McKenna started submitting illustrations to fantasy & horror fanzines such as the H.P. Lovecraft-inspired Dagon. His first professional commission was for Games Workshop's house magazine Warlock, and this was followed by further work for Games Workshop including Warhammer Fantasy Roleplay publications and the very first Warhammer 40,000 book.

McKenna was entirely self-taught as an artist and for many years he used entirely traditional materials. In 1997, he transitioned mostly to digital work.

== Reception ==
In Issue 93 of White Dwarf, Phil Gallagher called McKenna's artwork in the Games Workshop publication Death on the Reik "nothing short of superb — he deserves a lot of credit for the way he's captured the atmosphere of the Reikland setting, not to mention the personalities of the dozens of non-player characters."

== Awards ==
In 1995 he was awarded the British Fantasy Award for Best Artist.

== Personal life ==
He married and had a son born in 2013. His hobbies included reading, watching films, training his border collie, Nell, for sheepdog trials, hiking Scottish mountains, and flying airplanes. He lived in Lincolnshire, United Kingdom from 2014 to 2020 before relocating to Scotland in July 2020.

== Death ==
McKenna died by suicide in September 2020. He was survived by his son.

== Published work ==
Many of McKenna's works are archived on Flickr.

-
Publication	Company	Art Type	Year
The Croco Dolly	Scholastic	Cover, author & interior art	2014
El Aullido del Hombre Lobo	Mundos Epicos	Cover & interior art	2014
Into the Storm - Axel Rudi Pell	LPV/Steamhammer	Sleeve Art	2014
Beyond the Pit	Arion Games	Interior art	2014
Dr. Jekyll & Mr. Hyde	Oxford University Press	Interior art	2014
The Octopuppy	Omnibus Books/Scholastic	Author and Artist	2013
The Gift - paperback	Omnibus Books/Scholastic	Cover & interior art	2013
Fantasy Art Now - paperback	Collins	Author, editor & artist	2013
Shadows Over Innsmouth	Titan Books	Interior art	2013
Spectre	Telos	Cover art	2013
Blacksand	Arion Games	Cover art	2013
Le Hurlement du Loup-garou	Gallimard Jeunesse	Cover & interior art	2013
Blood of the Zombies	Tin Man	Interior art	2012
XB-1 Magazine December issue	Konektor	Cover art	2012
Chamber of Chills Vol 4	PS Publishing	Interior art	2012
Dark Heart	Ex Libris Auctor	Cover art	2012
La Nuit du Necromancien	Gallimard Jeunesse	Cover & interior art	2012
The Gift	Omnibus Books/Scholastic	Cover & interior art	2012
XB-1 Magazine October issue	Konnektor	Cover art	2012
The Weird and the Wonderful	Spectre Press	Interior art	2012
The Pirate of the Beyond	Gallimard Jeunesse	Cover art	2012
Living with Lady Macbeth and the Witches	Spearean	Cover art	2012
SFX Special Edition 55	Future	Interior art	2012
Wolfmen	Newton Compton Edition	Interior art	2012
Circle of the Oath - Axel Rudi Pell	SPV/Steamhammer	Sleeve art	2012
Armies of Death (new edition series 2 FF15)	Wizard Books	Cover art	2011
Grim & Grimmer Bk 4: The Calamitous Queen	Omnibus/Scholastic	Cover art	2011
The Shadowing Book 2: Skinned	Egmont	Cover art	2011
Grim & Grimmer Bk3: The Desperate Dwarf	Cover art	Cover art	2011
The Ballads IV - Axel Rudi Pell	SPV/Steamhammer	Sleeve art	2011
Curse of the Mummy (new edition series 2 FF14)	Wizard Books	Cover & interior art	2011
The Shadowing Book 1: Hunted	Egmont	Cover art	2011
Hour of the Beast	Freedoms Hammer Productions	Cover art	2011
Forest of Doom (new edition series 2 FF13)	Wizard Books	Cover art	2011
Fabled Lands Role-Playing Game	Greywood Publishing	Interior art	2011
A Minotaur at The Savoy	Mirus	Cover art	2011
Mirabilis comic - issues 1-3 & 6-8	Mirus	Cover art	2011
Mirabilis: Winter Vol 1	Mirus	Cover art	2011
World of Fantasy Magazine No 4 (80) April issue	TechnoMir (Russia)	Interior art	2010
Pocket Fantasy Art	Ilex Press	Author, editor & writer	2010
Trial of Champions (new edition series 2 FF12)	Wizard Books	Cover art	2010
The Crest - Axel Rudi Pell	SPV/Steamhammer	Sleeve art	2010
Grim & Grimmer Bk 3: The Grasping Goblin	Omnibus/Scholastic	Cover art	2010
Howl of the Werewolf (new edition series 2 FF11)	Wizard Books	Cover & interior art	2010
Night of the Necromancer (series 2 FF8)	Wizard Books	Cover & interior art	2010
City of Thieves (new edition series 2 FF6)	Wizard Books	Cover art	2010
Bloodbones (new edition series 2 FF7)	Wizard Books	Cover art	2010
Midgard	Suddeutche Zeitung	Cover art	2009
QUERP Core Rule Book 1st edition	Greywood Publishing	Interior art	2009
The Battle for Rondo	Omnibus/Scholastic	Cover art	2009
The Wizard of Rondo	Omnibus/Scholastic	Cover art	2009
The Warlock of Firetop Mountain (new edition series 2 FF1)	Wizard Books	Cover art	2009
The Fantasy Art Bible	Quarto/Chartwell Books Inc	Interior art	2009
The Monster Book of Zombies	Metro Books	Interior art	2009
Blackthorn Forest - Dungeon Crawl Expansion	Greywood Publishing	Cover & interior art	2009
Epic Adventure Dungeon Crawl - Core Boxed Set	Greywood Publishing	Interior art	2008
Vampiri!	Newton Compton Edition	Interior art	2008
Il Grande Libro Di Dracula	Newton Compton Edition	Interior art	2008
Fantasy Art Magazine Top Artist vol 32	China New Media	Interior art	2008
Children's Great Explorers Encyclopedia	TallTree/Paragon	Interior art	2008
Gothic Art Now	Ilex Press	Interior art	2008
Nowa Fantastyka Magazine, August Issue	Proszynski Media	Cover art	2008
Faeries	Nestiveqnen Editions	Interior art	2008
L'univers des Dragons tome 2	Galerie Daniel Maghen	Interior art	2008
Fantasy Art Magazine Top Artist vol 27	China New Media	Interior art	2008
Misterstourworm and the Kelpies Gift	Circular Records	Cover & interior art	2008
Fantasy Report magazine	Eltra Publishing	Cover & interior art	2008
Fantasy Art Now	Ilex Press/Collins	Author, editor & artist	2007
Nowa Fantastyka Magazine, November issue	Proszynski Media	Cover	2007
Lesser Shades of Evil	Ravencross Publishing / Eos Press	Interior art	2007
Howl of the Werewolf	Wizard Books	Cover & interior art	2007
The Key to Rondo	Scholastic	Cover art	2007
Spellbreaker	Wizard Books	Cover art	2007
Fantastyka Magazine, Winter Issue	Proszynski Media	Cover art	2007
Curse of the Mummy	Wizard Books	Cover & interior art	2007
Nowa Fantastyka Magazine, Dec issue	Proszynski Media	Cover art	2006
Bloodbones	Wizard Books	Cover art	2006
Nowa Fantastyka Magazine, July issue	Proszynski Media	Cover & interior art	2006
Digital Horror Art	Ilex Press/Thomson	Author & artist	2006
Drawing and Painting Fantasy Landscapes and Cityscapes	Barron's / New Burlington Books	Contributor	2006
Nowa Fantastyka Magazine, April issue	Proszynski Media	Cover art	2006
Talisman of Death	Wizard Books	Cover art	2006
The Forgotten Spell	Wizard Books	Cover & interior art	2006
Fantastyka Magazine, Winter Issue	Proszynski Media	Cover art	2005
Toxic Magazine	Egmont Magazines	Interior art	2005
Fantastyka Magazine, Summer Issue	Hodder & Stoughton	Cover art	2005
Worldwar: Homeward Bound	Wizard Books	Cover art	2005
Valley of Lights	Telos Publishing	Cover art	2005
Eye of the Dragon	Wizard Books	Cover & interior art	2005
Anatomy for Fantasy Artists	Barron's/D&C	Interior art	2005
Dhampir	Time Warner/Orbit	Cover art	2005
How to Draw & Sell Digital Cartoons	Ilex Press/Barron's	Interior art	2005
Sorcery! Book 3: The Seven Serpents RPG	Myriador Ltd.	Cover art	2005
Forest of Doom RPG	Myriador Ltd.	Interior art	2004
Digital Fantasy Painting Workshop	Ilex Press/Collins	Author & artist	2004
Settling Accounts Book 1: Return Engagement	Hodder & Stoughton	Cover art	2004
Legend of Zagor	Wizard Books	Cover & interior art	2004
Temple of Terror	Wizard Books	Cover art	2004
Sorcery! Book 2: Khare - Cityport of Traps RPG	Myriador Ltd.	Interior art	2004
Trial of Champions RPG	Myriador Ltd.	Cover & interior art	2004
.Net magazine	Future Publishing	Cover art	2004
Drawing & Painting Fantasy Figures	Barron's/D&C	Interior art	2003
Dragonlance: Age Of Mortals	Sovereign Press	Interior art	2003
Sovereign Stone: Marauders of the Wolf	Sovereign Press	Interior art	2003
Journey Into The Void	HarperCollins	Cover art	2003
King of Foxes	HarperCollins	Cover art	2003
The Mammoth Book of Stephen Jones	PS Publishing	Interior art	2003
Island of the Lizard King	Wizard Books	Cover art	2003
Return to Firetop Mountain	Wizard Books	Interior art	2003
Sorcery! Book 1: The Shamutanti Hills RPG	Myriador Ltd.	Cover design & interior art	2003
Deathtrap Dungeon RPG	Myriador Ltd.	Cover design & interior art	2003
Armies of Death	Wizard Books	Cover art	2003
Trial of Champions	Wizard Books	Cover art	2003
Caverns of the Snow Witch RPG	Myriador Ltd.	Cover design & interior art	2003
The Warlock of Firetop Mountain RPG	Myriador Ltd.	Cover & interior art	2003
Forest of Doom	Wizard Books	Cover art	2003
Thinking Through Religion	Oxford University Press	Interior art	2003
Hawk Eyes	Oxford University Press	Cover art	2003
Digital Fantasy Painting	Ilex Press/Watson Guptil	Interior art	2002
Talon of the Silver Hawk	HarperCollins	Cover art	2002
City of Thieves	Wizard Books	Cover art	2002
Doctor Who: Nightdreamers	Telos Publishing	Frontispiece	2002
The Warlock of Firetop Mountain	Wizard Books	Cover art	2002
Inferno! issue 30	GW/The Black Library	Cover art	2002
Nobilis	Hogshead Publishing	Interior art	2002
Fire! Fire!	Oxford University Press	Interior art	2002
Reach for the Stars	Oxford University Press	Interior art	2002
The Cosmic Clock	Oxford University Press	Interior art	2002
Guardians of the Lost	HarperCollins	Cover art	2001
The Dinosaur Planet Omnibus	LittleBrown/Orbit	Cover art	2001
Oxford Mathswise Posters	Oxford University Press	Poster art	2001
The Building Site	Oxford University Press	Interior art	2001
Mummies, Tombs, and the Afterlife	Oxford University Press	Cover & interior art	2001
The Vikings	Oxford University Press	Cover & interior art	2001
Arthur Warrior Chief	Oxford University Press	Cover art	2001
Warhammer Monthly issue 49	GW/The Black Library	Cover art	2001
Honour Guard	GW/The Black Library	Cover art	2001
Pacific Warriors	Interactive Vision	Cover art	2001
Well of Darkness	HarperCollins	Cover art	2000
Road Wars	Interactive Vision	Cover art	2000
Search And Rescue 2	Interactive Vision	Cover art	2000
PC Strategy Games magazine issue 3	Crimson Publishing	Cover art	2000
The Ultimate Book of Dinosaurs	Monkey Puzzle/Parragon	Interior art	2000
Dr. Jekyll and Mr. Hyde	Oxford University Press	Interior art	1999
Urban Chaos	Eidos Interactive	Conceptual Art	1999
Deathtrap Dungeon	Eidos Interactive	Cover & interior art	1998
Games Master magazine issue 61	Future Publishing	Interior art	1997
Challenging the Wolf	Squane's Pass	Cover & interior art	1997
The Mammoth Book of Dracula	Robinson Books	Interior art	1997
Through the Glass Darkly (Nightbane World Book 3)	Palladium Books	Interior art	1997
New West (Rifts World Book 14)	Palladium Books	Interior art	1997
Lone Star (Rifts World Book 13)	Palladium Books	Interior art	1997
Psyscape (Rifts World Book 12)	Palladium Books	Interior art	1997
Magic: the Gathering (Mirage)	Wizards of the Coast	Card art	1996
Coalition War Campaign (Rifts World Book 11)	Palladium Books	Interior art	1996
Nightlands (Nightbane World Book 2)	Palladium Books	Interior art	1996
Between the Shadows (Nightbane World Book 1)	Palladium Books	Cover art	1996
Adventure on the High Seas (Palladium RPG Bk 3)	Palladium Books	Cover & interior art	1996
Old Ones (Palladium Fantasy RPG Book II)	Palladium Books	Cover & interior art	1996
Palladium Fantasy Role-Playing Game	Palladium Books	Cover & interior art	1996
The Giant Book of Fantasy & The Supernatural	Magpie Books	Interior art	1996
Silver Rhapsody	BFS	Interior art	1996
Kimota magazine issue 4	PSFG	Interior art	1996
Chills magazine issues 9 & 10	BFS	Interior art	1996
Deathrealm magazine issue 30	Malicious Press	Interior art	1996
The Scream Factory magazine issue 61	Deadline Press	Cover art	1996
The Night of the Green Dragon	Oxford University Press	Cover & interior art	1996
The Giant Book of Frankenstein	Magpie/The Book Company	Interior art	1995
The Giant Book of Werewolves	Magpie/Parragon	Interior art	1995
The Giant Book of Zombies	Magpie/Parragon	Interior art	1995
Everway	Wizards of the Coast	Card art	1995
Curse of the Mummy (Fighting Fantasy 59)	Puffin Books	Cover & interior art	1995
Revenge of the Vampire (Fighting Fantasy 58)	Puffin Books	Interior art	1995
Out There In The Darkness	Subterranean Press	Cover art	1995
Mystique magazine issue 6	BFS	Interior art	1995
Kimota magazine issue 3	PSFG	Interior art	1995
Kimota magazine issue 2	PSFG	Cover art	1995
Beyond magazine issue 2	Parallel Universe	Interior art	1995
Beyond magazine issue 1	Parallel Universe	Cover & interior art	1995
The Silver Sword	Oxford University Press	Cover & interior art	1995
Catalogue	Fedogan & Bremer	Cover art	1995
Catalogue	Cold Tonnage Books	Cover art	1995
Catalogue	Cold Tonnage Books	Cover art	1994
Fantasycon XIX programme	BFS	Interior art	1994
Fantasycon XIX	BFS	Logo art	1994
Catalogue	DreamHaven Books	Cover art	1994
The Giant Book of Vampires	Magpie Books	Interior art	1994
Interzone magazine issue 81	Interzone	Cover art	1994
Northern Chills	Kimota Publishing	Cover & interior art	1994
Shadows Over Innsmouth	Fedogan & Bremer	Cover & interior art	1994
The Anthology of Fantasy & The Supernatural	Tiger Books	Interior art	1994
The Mammoth Book of Frankenstein	Robinson Books	Interior art	1994
The Mammoth Book of Werewolves	Robinson Books	Interior art	1994
Look & Find Fantasy game	Hasbro UK	Cover & interior art	1994
Steve Jackson's Battlecards	Merlin Trading Cards	Packaging & card art	1994
Legend of Zagor (Fighting Fantasy 54)	Puffin Books	Cover & interior art	1994
The Legend of Zagor Fighting Fantasy boardgame	Hasbro UK	Interior art	1993
Mystique magazine issue 5	BFS	Interior art	1993
Chills magazine issue 7	BFS	Cover art	1993
The Mammoth Book of Zombies	Robinson Books	Interior art	1993
The Mammoth Book of Vampires	Robinson Books	Interior art	1993
Interzone magazine issue 59, 62, 65	Interzone	Interior art	1993
Interzone magazine issue 55	Interzone	Cover & interior art	1992
Far Point magazine issue 3	Victoria Publications	Interior art	1992
Kimota magazine issue 1	PSFG	Cover & interior art	1992
Mystique magazine issue 4	BFS	Interior art	1992
Chills magazine issue 6	BFS	Interior art	1992
The Fighting Fantasy 10th Anniversary Yearbook	Puffin Books	Interior art	1992
Return to Firetop Mountain (Fighting Fantasy 50)	Puffin Books	Interior art	1992
Moonrunner (Fighting Fantasy 48)	Puffin Books	Interior art	1992
Castle Drachenfels (WFRP)	Games Workshop	Interior art	1992
Fantasycon XVI programme	BFS	Interior art	1991
Fantasycon XVI	BFS	Logo art	1991
Interzone magazine issues 43, 46, 48, 52	Interzone	Interior art	1991
Legend of the Shadow Warriors (FF 44)	Puffin Books	Interior art	1991
White Dwarf magazine 133, 137, 138, 140, 142	Games Workshop	Interior art	1991
Storm Warriors	GW Books	Interior art	1991
Fantasy Tales vol.10 nos. 6 & 7	Robinson Books	Interior art	1991
Fantasy Tales vol.10 nos. 4 & 5	Robinson Books	Interior art	1990
Winter Chills magazine issue 4	BFS	Cover & interior art	1990
Krokodil Tears	GW Books	Interior art	1990
Demon Download	GW Books	Interior art	1990
Warhammer Companion (WFRP)	Games Workshop	Interior art	1990
Waaargh the Orks! (Warhammer 40k)	Games Workshop	Interior art	1990
White Dwarf magazine 121, 124, 125, 126, 130	Games Workshop	Interior art	1990
Red Thirst	GW Books	Interior art	1990
Fantasycon XIV programme	BFS	Cover art	1989
Skeleton Crew magazine issue 5	Grim Reaper Design	Cover art	1989
Wolf Riders	GW Books	Interior art	1989
Ignorant Armies	GW Books	Interior art	1989
Zaragoz	GW Books	Interior art	1989
Drachenfels	GW Books	Interior art	1989
Warhammer 40,000 Compendium	Games Workshop	Interior art	1989
Space Marine 3D Roleplay game	Games Workshop	Interior art	1989
The Restless Dead (WFRP)	Games Workshop	Interior art	1989
Steve Jackson's F.I.S.T	Computerdial Ltd	Advertising art	1989
Dead of Night (Fighting Fantasy 40)	Puffin Books	Interior art	1989
Vault of the Vampire (Fighting Fantasy 38)	Puffin Books	Interior art	1989
White Dwarf magazine 112, 114, 117, 118, 119, 120	Games Workshop	Interior art	1989
Dagon magazine issue 26	Dagon Press	Back cover art	1989
Mystique magazine issue 2	BFS	Interior art	1989
Winter Chills magazine issue 3	BFS	Interior art	1989
Fantasy Tales vol.10 nos. 2 & 3	Robinson Books	Interior art	1989
Fantasy Tales vol.10 no.1	Robinson Books	Interior art	1988
World Fantasy Convention art show programme	British Fantasy Society	Cover art	1988
Skeleton Crew magazine double issue 3/4	Grim Reaper Design	Interior art	1988
Daggers of Darkness (Fighting Fantasy 35)	Puffin Books	Interior art	1988
White Line Fever (Dark Future)	Games Workshop	Interior art	1988
Something Rotten in Kislev (WFRP)	Games Workshop	Interior art	1988
Warhammer Campaign (WFRP)	Games Workshop	Interior art	1988
Power Behind the Throne (WFRP)	Games Workshop	Interior art	1988
Realm of Chaos	Games Workshop	Interior art	1988
White Dwarf magazine 97, 98, 104	Games Workshop	Interior art	1988
Die Rubezahl magazine issue 5	Pob Publishing	Cover & interior art	1988
Warhammer 40,000 Rogue Trader	Games Workshop	Interior art	1987
The Fury of Dracula boardgame	Games Workshop	Interior art	1987
Advanced RuneQuest Third Edition	Games Workshop	Interior art	1987
Warhammer City (Warhammer Fantasy Roleplay)	Games Workshop	Interior art	1987
Death on the Reik (Warhammer Fantasy Roleplay)	Games Workshop	Interior art	1987
Green and Pleasant Land (Call of Cthulhu)	Games Workshop	Interior art	1987
White Dwarf magazine 85, 86, 88, 93, 94	Games Workshop	Interior art	1987
Adventurer magazine issues 6, 7, 8	Mersey Leisure Publishing	Interior art	1987
Dagon magazine issue 20	Dagon Press	Back cover	1987
Dagon magazine double issue 18/19	Dagon Press	Interior art	1987
Dagon magazine issue 17	Dagon Press	Back cover	1987
Dagon magazine issue 16	Dagon Press	Cover art	1987
Winter Chills magazine issue 2	BFS	Interior art	1987
Fantasy Tales vol.9 no.17	Fantasy Tales	Interior art	1987
Die Rubezahl issue 4	Dagon Press	Interior art	1987
White Dwarf magazine issue 84	Games Workshop	Interior art	1986
The Enemy Within (Warhammer Fantasy Roleplay)	Games Workshop	Interior art	1986
Warlock magazine issue 12 and issue 13	Games Workshop	Interior art	1986
Adventurer magazine issue 3	Mersey Leisure Publishing	Interior art	1986
Dagon magazine issue 15	Dagon Press	Cover & interior art	1986
Dagon magazine issue 14	Dagon Press	Back cover	1986
Die Rubezahl magazine issues 1, 2, 3	Pob Publishing	Covers & interior art	1986
Monstrous Perversion no.2	Pob Publishing	Covers & interior art	1985
