= Jim Bambra =

Role-playing game designer

- Born: 1956 (age 69–70)
- Occupation: Game designer

Jim Bambra (born 1956) is a British designer and reviewer of fantasy roleplaying games (RPG), and a former company director. He is particularly known for his contributions to Dungeons & Dragons, Fighting Fantasy, Warhammer, and Star Wars: The Roleplaying Game which was based on the Star Wars films. Later he became head of design at MicroProse, then managing director of Pivotal Games, a publisher of video games including Conflict: Desert Storm.

== Career ==
Jim Bambra worked on game design and materials for various companies during the 1980s and early 1990s, including TSR (publisher of Dungeons & Dragons), Games Workshop (Warhammer), and West End Games (Star Wars RPG).

In 1983, Bambra wrote "The Beginner’s Guide to Roleplaying Games" (with Paul Ruiz), published in Imagine magazine Issue 6 (Sept 1983), explaining what an RPG is and accompanied by a comic strip, "The Adventures of Nic Novice". He was a reviewer and writer for Imagine magazine 1983-1985. He was a reviewer for White Dwarf and Dragon magazines during the late 1980s and early 1990s. He was also a designer of Warhammer Fantasy Roleplay, published in 1986.

In 1989, Bambra co-wrote the Fighting Fantasy gamebook Dead of Night for Puffins, a Penguin inprint, with Stephen Hand. During the 1990s he was Head of Design at MicroProse, where he worked on projects including Fields of Glory, Grand Prix, Special Forces, various X-COM products, and Gunship.

In 1996 Bambra founded Pumpkin Studios, which achieved success with Warzone 2100, a computer game with a post-nuclear scenario. This company closed in 2000 after Eidos Interactive cancelled its then current project, Saboteur, a PlayStation video game.

In 2003 he became managing director at Pivotal Games Ltd, a videogame development company based in Bath and owned by SCi Ltd. During his period at the firm it published the series of Conflict: videogames, the most successful of which was Conflict: Desert Storm. He remained as director until 2008, when SCi closed down the company. Between 2005 and 2009 he was also a board member of The Independent Games Developers Association Ltd.

== Gamebooks and materials ==
Jim Bambra produced the following gamebooks and materials for role-playing games, many in collaboration with other authors:

=== For Dungeons & Dragons ===
- All That Glitters... – Advanced D&D module, pub. TSR, 1984
- Dark Clouds Gather, Advanced D&D module, TSR, 1985
- Blade of Vengeance – D&D module, TSR, 1985
- Creature Catalogue (Dungeons & Dragons Accessory AC9 ), TSR, 1986
- Night's Dark Terror, 1986. A D&D module, one of the last products of TSR UK
- The Golden Khan of Ethengar, D&D Gazetteer, TSR, 1989.
- The Sea People, D&D book, TSR, 1990
- The Complete Book of Dwarves (Advanced Dungeons & Dragons), 2nd Ed., Player's Handbook Rules Supplement, TSR, 1991.

=== Other ===
- Dark Side of the Moon (Star Frontiers Module SFAD6), TSR Hobbies, 1985
- Warhammer Campaign (The Enemy Within/Shadows Over Bögenhafen), Games Workshop, 1988
- Dead of Night (Fighting Fantasy Gamebook), Puffin Books, 1989
- Domain of Evil (Star Wars RPG) Paperback – West End Games, 1991. A supplement to Star Wars RPG.
- The GodNet: Virtual Reality in the Cyberpapacy (TORG: Roleplaying the Possibility Wars), Torg gamebook (with Bill Slavisek), West End Games, 1991
- The Legacy: Realm of Terror (1993) is a DOS first person perspective RPG game developed by Magnetic Scrolls from an original idea by Jim Bambra, Stephen Hand, Matt Innes, John Oldman.
- Warhammer Fantasy Roleplay, Games Workshop Ltd. / Hogshead Publishing Ltd., 1995. This scenario was discussed by Dormans (2006) in a study of pen-and-paper roleplaying games, arguing that a moral stance was implicit in many such games, the scenario of Warhammer Fantasy Roleplay in particular bearing an intentional analogue to the nuclear threat perceived at the time: "... the original setting is a powerful image of what England might have been like during the later stages of the Cold War era: a country living under the constant threat of full-scale war and having already experienced the devastating effects of nuclear disaster. To act and make strategic choices in a world thus infused with meaning can become an act of personal expression and experimentation."
