= Hogshead Publishing =

British publisher of role-playing and storytelling games

Hogshead Publishing was a British game company that produced role-playing games and game supplements.

== History ==
In October 1994, James Wallis founded Hogshead Publishing, a company which specialised in role-playing and storytelling games. Wallis based the company in the UK, and got a license from Phil Gallagher at Games Workshop to publish books for Warhammer Fantasy Roleplay. Wallis and Andrew Rilstone changed the name of the magazine Inter*action to Interactive Fantasy due to trademark concerns beginning with its second issue, which was also Hogshead's first publication; the magazine only lasted two more issues after that. Warhammer sold well, but Hogshead had problems with their distributor, and Wallis had to let go of all the company's staff. By the end of 1997, cashflow had improved so Wallis moved the company to an office, and hired Matthew Pook. Phil Masters contributed adventures to Hogshead Publishing's licensed version of Warhammer Fantasy Roleplay in the mid-1990s. Shadows Over Bögenhafen (1995) was the first in a series reissuing GW's well-respected The Enemy Within Campaign; Hogshead's updated Enemy Within campaign (1995-1999) was very well received.

Wallis was able to publish his game The Extraordinary Adventures of Baron Munchausen in 1998, the first of what would later be called the company's "New Style" RPGs. John Scott Tynes designed Puppetland (1999), the next New Style game. Violence (1999), by Greg Costikyan (aka Designer X), was, according to Shannon Appelcline, "probably the least well-loved of the New Style games". Robin Laws designed Pantheon and Other Roleplaying Games (2000) as one of the company's "New Style" RPGs. De Profundis (2001), by Michael Oracz, was the last of the New Style role-playing games published by Hogshead Publishing. In 2002 Hogshead Publishing printed the second edition of Nobilis.

Hogshead Publishing published Realms of Sorcery (2001), which finally updated the rushed magic system in the original Warhammer rulebook. Mike Mearls wrote the last product from Hogshead Publishing, a Warhammer adventure titled Fear the Worst (2002) that Hogshead released for free on the internet. On 26 November 2002, Wallis announced that he was ending Hogshead Publishing, and Mark Ricketts bought the company name in February 2003. In early 2003, after Wallis closed down Hogshead Publishing, the rights to Warhammer Fantasy Roleplay reverted to Games Workshop. SLA Industries returned to Dave Allsop. Hogshead returned the rights of the New Style games to their creators.
