= Warhammer Fantasy Roleplay =

Fantasy roleplaying game

A Grim World of Perilous Adventure
- 2nd edition cover, 2005
- Designers: (1st edition) Richard Halliwell, Rick Priestley, Graeme Davis, Jim Bambra, Phil Gallagher; (2nd edition) Chris Pramas; (3rd edition) Jay Little, Daniel Lovet Clark, Michael Hurley, Tim Uren; (4th edition) Dominic McDowall, Andy Law
- Publishers: Games Workshop (1st edition); Black Industries (2nd edition); Fantasy Flight Games (2nd and 3rd edition); Cubicle 7 (4th edition)
- Publication: 1986 (1st edition); 2005 (2nd edition); 2009 (3rd edition); 2018 (4th edition)
- Genres: Fantasy
- Systems: Custom / Percentile
- Website: cubicle7games.com/our-games/warhammer-fantasy-roleplay
- ISBN: 978-1899749010

Warhammer Fantasy Roleplay or Warhammer Fantasy Role-Play (abbreviated to WFRP or WHFRP) is a tabletop role-playing game set in the Warhammer Fantasy setting, published by Games Workshop or its licensees.

The first edition of WFRP was published in 1986 and later re-published by Hogshead Publishing. The second edition developed by Green Ronin Publishing was published in 2004 by Black Industries. Fantasy Flight Games published a third edition under licence in November 2009. This edition used a new system, retaining few mechanics of the original. Then the fourth edition rooted in the first and second editions was released under licence by Cubicle 7 in 2018.

== Publishing history ==
=== First edition ===
Warhammer Fantasy Roleplay was first published in 1986 by Games Workshop, Games Workshop's first new publication following the company's purchase by Bryan Ansell around 1985. "Game design and development" was credited to Richard Halliwell, Rick Priestley, Graeme Davis, Jim Bambra, and Phil Gallagher; the art editor was John Blanche. The product was intended as an adjunct to the Warhammer Fantasy Battle tabletop game. A number of Games Workshop publications – such as the Realm of Chaos titles – included material for WFRP and WFB (and the Warhammer 40,000 science fiction setting), and a conversion system for WFB was published with the WFRP rules. Though Games Workshop saw success following the publication of the popular The Enemy Within campaign series a small number of additional supplements (including a character pack, Gamemaster's screen, and the aforementioned Realm of Chaos books), it made the decision to refocus its business. It had found that the miniatures business was more profitable as the table-top RPG scene waned in the 1980s.

Publication of WFRP material was turned over to Flame Publications, a division of Games Workshop focused exclusively on roleplaying, in 1989. Flame published a new series of adventures – the Doomstones campaign adapted from a set of Advanced Dungeons & Dragons modules written by a freelancer – and published the first issue of what was intended to become a monthly or quarterly publication, Warhammer Companion. In 1992, following financial problems, Flame ceased operations. Fan websites continued to publish new material and adaptations of Warhammer Fantasy Battle materials, but no new official material appeared for several years.

Nexus Editrice, one of the main RPG publishers in Italy, asked for a licence from Games Workshop. The game was out of print in English, but Nexus acquired the licence and reissued the edition in Italian, editing the text and including new artwork by artists such as Paolo Parente. The game was released in spring 1994 and won the Best of Show prize at the Lucca Games show, the main game fair in Italy. It had several reprints, both hardback and paperback, and it was followed by the translation of the Enemy Within campaign, a Warhammer Compendium, a Warhammer collection of 28 issues in Italian newspaper kiosks with stories, an Encyclopaedia Albionica about the world of Warhammer and a Warhammer Adventures original board game. This success helped bring new licences soon after, including German and Czech ones, which used Nexus's layout and artwork.

In 1995, British publishing house Hogshead Publishing received a licence to publish new and reprinted WFRP material. Hogshead published a revised edition of the main WFRP rulebook, as well as reprints of the Enemy Within campaign. New supplements also appeared, including the Realms of Sorcery magic supplement and a number of new adventures. Hogshead was subject to a number of restrictions in its rights regarding the WFRP licence; Games Workshop retained extensive editorial control over the line, wanting to ensure that new WFRP material did not contradict the tone and details of the Warhammer Fantasy Battle line.

In 2002, Hogshead owner James Wallis sold his business and returned the WFRP licence to Games Workshop, leaving the future of the game in doubt. Several Hogshead projects were abandoned, including a Skaven supplement and a complete rewrite of the final episode of the Enemy Within campaign.

=== Second edition ===
Black Industries, a newly created division of Game Workshop's Black Library publishing arm, oversaw the publishing and distribution of a new second edition of Warhammer Fantasy Roleplay, designed by Green Ronin Publishing. The second edition uses the same basic system as the first, but revised and updated a number of features of the system including replacing the magic system. The new WFRP also brought the setting up to date with the developments in background story that had taken place in the Warhammer Fantasy Battle game setting since the first edition placing the events of the new edition after the 2004 "Storm of Chaos" campaign for WFB. The new rulebook was released in March 2005, followed by supplements and sourcebooks, including a new epic campaign (the Paths of the Damned series); monster, equipment and setting supplements; and a number of stand-alone adventures.

Black Industries announced in January 2008 that it would be exiting the roleplaying game market. The Thousand Thrones Campaign was their final WFRP publication. In 2008, Fantasy Flight Games (FFG) acquired the exclusive rights to publish board games, card games, and role-playing games based on Games Workshop properties, including WFRP. FFG released the Career Compendium and Shades of Empire for the second edition.

=== Third edition ===
On 12 August 2009, Fantasy Flight Games announced a 3rd edition for immediate release, packaged as a single box containing four rulebooks, over 300 cards and counters, and three sets of 12 custom dice. One year later FFG released the rules in standalone books (and PDFs).

On 12 August 2014, Fantasy Flight Games announced that the third-edition product line was "complete" and that no further products would be released for it. In September 2016, the companies announced an end to their licensing agreement. All Games Workshop-licensed FFG products were discontinued at the end of February 2017.

=== Fourth edition ===
On 24 May 2017, Games Workshop and Cubicle 7 announced a fourth edition of WFRP by making improvements to modernise the system, saying it would take "its direction from the first and second editions of the game". The fourth edition was released in digital formats in August 2018 with physical release in November 2018.

== Setting ==
Warhammer Fantasy Roleplay shares the same doom-laden background as the Warhammer Fantasy Battle (WFB) wargame, with a focus on the Empire. Since it is a game devoted to individual characters rather than to entire armies, WFRP depicts the setting in much closer detail than its wargame counterpart. This change of focus also results in a more grim and perilous game.

The primary setting of WFRP is the Empire, a faction located in a region of the "Old World", that is based loosely on the Holy Roman Empire, with a number of baronies, counties and dukedoms fashioned after the fiefs of elector counts and dukes. Bordering regions include "Bretonnia" (medieval France, later reinvented using strong Arthurian mythology themes); "Kislev", based on medieval Poland and Imperial Russia; and the "Wasteland", whose sole city of Marienburg is based on the Low Countries. Other lands mentioned include the fragmented lands of 'Estalia' and 'Tilea' (Spain and the city-states of Renaissance Italy respectively), and 'Araby', a mixture of the Arabic Caliphate and Persia. Other lands with real-life analogies include 'Cathay' (China), 'Khuresh' (Southeast Asia), 'Nippon' (Japan), 'Ind' (India), Naggaroth (northern North America), 'Ulthuan' (Atlantis), 'Lustria' (Mesoamerica), 'Norsca' (Scandinavia) and the island of 'Albion' (British Isles); however, very little official information has been released for these locales.

While the setting of Warhammer Fantasy Roleplay shares traits, such as the existence of elves and goblins, with other popular fantasy settings, it is technologically set slightly later than classic fantasy, closer to the early Renaissance era in terms of technology and society. Firearms are readily available, though expensive and unreliable, and a growing mercantile middle class challenges the supremacy of the nobility. The Empire's capital, Altdorf, is not only the seat of the Emperor but also home to the Colleges of Magic, where sanctioned wizards are trained under strict imperial oversight.

One of the most identifiable features of the Warhammer setting is Chaos. While the forces of Chaos in Warhammer Fantasy Battle are depicted primarily in the form of bloodthirsty marauders, towering dark knights and savage beastmen, Chaos in WFRP is an insidious force gnawing at the fabric of society. Secret cults are found among all strata of society, seeking to overthrow the social order or to further their own power. Mutants lurk in the forests outside the great cities, while the Skaven (a race of mutated humanoid rats) tunnel endlessly beneath their feet.

Magic is widely feared and reviled, and not without reason. Magic is derived from – and thus corrupted by – Chaos, and its practitioners tread a fine line between death or corruption and relative safety.

== System ==
Combat in Warhammer Fantasy Roleplay was adapted from the large-scale miniature combat of Warhammer Fantasy Battle. It is more 'deadly' than other contemporary systems. (Note: Compare with Dungeons & Dragons, for example, where characters gain lots of hit points as they level up) Most human-level creatures and characters can take only one or two hits before receiving a serious injury or a "Critical Hit" that may instantly kill, cripple, or permanently maim a character. There are no regeneration or resurrection powers in WFRP and limited healing options. A limited number of "Fate Points", which represent a character's fate or destiny, offset this in giving opportunities to avoid crippling or killing results.

=== Careers ===
A central feature of all editions of Warhammer Fantasy Roleplay is the career system. Characters advance by taking on a career that provide access to a series of new or improved skills and bonuses to attributes (called "advances"). The career has requirements (acquiring tools of the trade, etc.) to be completed as part of the development before moving on to another career; some careers are pre-requisites for subsequent careers. The careers reflect the late medieval/early Renaissance setting of the Old World. There are "basic" careers for low level characters and advanced careers giving access to higher skills and bonuses. The initial career establishes the character before they embarked on a career as an adventurer (working as a baker, night watchman, rat catcher, or farmer etc). Thereafter, the career is the occupation during and between adventures (thief, wizard's apprentice, druid etc), as well as how the character has changed and developed through their career (becoming a mercenary, explorer, or ship's captain etc).

=== First edition ===
The set of numbers describing a character's abilities in the first edition is closely based on early versions of Warhammer Fantasy Battle. The same basic array of characteristics (Movement, Weapon Skill, Ballistic Skill, Strength, Toughness, Wounds (hit points), Initiative, Attacks, Dexterity, Leadership, Intelligence, Cool, Willpower, and Fellowship) is employed for both games. More detail and differentiation between characters than is required in a wargame is provided by using a percentile (1–100) scale for the skill-based characteristics instead of a decile (1–10) scale.

=== Second edition ===
The second edition had every primary ("Main") characteristic on the 1–100 scale, with the tens digit of these values still corresponding to WFB's traits' values where required. For instance, a Strength value of 42% means your "Strength Bonus" is 4, which is directly comparable to WFB. Characteristics are tested using percentile dice, with penalties or bonuses applied to the roll or the target value according to various favourable and unfavourable circumstances.

The eight Main characteristics (rated from 01 to 100) were Weapon Skill (melee weapons), Ballistic Skill (ranged weapons), Strength (physical power), Toughness (physical resistance), Agility (physical aptitude), Intelligence (mental aptitude), Willpower (mental resistance), and Fellowship (social aptitude). The Secondary characteristics (rated from 1 to 10 or more) were Attacks (combat actions per turn), Wounds (hit points), Strength Bonus (combat attacks), Toughness Bonus (combat defence), Magic, Insanity Points, and Fate Points. Dexterity was renamed to Agility, Leadership was merged with Fellowship, and Cool was merged with Willpower.

Magical abilities (called 'spells') were focused more on affecting individuals rather than battlefield units as in first edition. The 'magic points' of first edition were replaced by a risk of manifestations of Chaos from using magic that could brand the character as a witch. Each school of magic had its own signature spells, giving different abilities and strengths to the various spellcasters.

Insanity Points are accumulated by being exposed to stressful events: being wounded in combat, catching a disease, witnessing the gruesome deaths of others, or being exposed to Chaos. They may be lowered by taking a permanent mental disadvantage.

Fate Points are spent to re-roll a major fumble or unfavourable result (usually something that ended in their death). Characters receive a few at character creation and rarely get a chance to earn new ones in-game. Fortune Points (used to re-roll minor fumbles) are renewable, but can only be played once per session. They are equal to the current number of Fate Points the character has. The player has to decide whether they want to permanently spend a Fate Point or temporarily spend a Fortune Point to deal with a problem.

Another change is switching to a more consistent set of dice used. For instance, you add a D10 to the damage of an attack instead of the D6 used in First Edition.

=== Third edition ===
In 2009, Fantasy Flight Games released a third edition of Warhammer Fantasy Roleplay that significantly diverged from previous versions. It introduced a custom dice pool system that replaced the traditional percentile mechanics and emphasised narrative outcomes, allowing for simultaneous success and complications. Gameplay incorporated extensive physical components – cards, tokens, and standees – to streamline play and reduce dependence on the rulebook. Character creation and progression were redesigned, with attributes grouped into thematic pairs and several traits reclassified. The edition aimed to deliver a more accessible, board game-like roleplaying experience. Reception was mixed, with some praising its innovation and others criticizing its complexity and cost.

=== Fourth edition ===
The mechanics of the fourth edition revert to the percentile mechanics of the first and second editions, instead of the custom dice pools of the third. Characters are now much more free to advance their Characteristics and Skills independently of their careers, and the cost in experience points scale with higher numbers. Skill usage (especially in combat situations) is expanded with the concept of 'advantage', where continued success grants cumulative bonuses. Wizardly magic keeps many spells of second edition, but integrates the casting mechanism into the overall task resolution system. Fourth edition is the first to offer guidelines on downtime – what happens between adventures.

== Reception ==
Ste Dillon reviewed Warhammer Fantasy Roleplay for Adventurer magazine and stated that "there's nothing new in it. Sure, it's destined to be a big seller, and it certainly is good value for money, providing you want a new system."

In the August 1987 edition of Dragon (Issue 124), Ken Rolston compared it very favourably to other fantasy role-playing games on the market, saying "WFR deliberately aims at adventures and settings with a less elevated tone." He concluded with a strong recommendation, saying, "Warhammer Fantasy Roleplay is strongly recommended for gamers in search of a fantasy system and campaign background, or in search of elements to steal and add to their current system and campaign."

In the December 1987 issue of The Games Machine (#2), John Woods liked the look of the book, but soon found a lot of typos and a lack of organisation. Woods also found the rules overly simplistic. He concluded, "Probably not a system with much to offer the experienced RPGer, but straightforward and detailed enough to give good value to beginners or those moving into RPGs from wargaming."

Stewart Wieck reviewed Warhammer Fantasy Role Play in White Wolf #9 (1988), rating it a 9 out of 10 and stated that "The system is very workable, adaptable, and most importantly, fun. WFRP is an excellent addition to the fantasy games which are currently available."

In his 1990 book The Complete Guide to Role-Playing Games, game critic Rick Swan gave the game his top rating of 4 out of 4, saying, "in its treatment of dark fantasy, Warhammer is without peer."

In a 1996 reader poll conducted by Arcane magazine to determine the 50 most popular roleplaying games of all time, Warhammer Fantasy Roleplay was ranked fourth. Editor Paul Pettengale commented, "Warhammer Fantasy Roleplay is an extremely atmospheric game to play in", and described the game as feeling like a cross-breed between Dungeons & Dragons and Call of Cthulhu, saying "if you've played these other two games, you can probably imagine what a superb mix that can be."

Dan Joyce retroactively reviewed Warhammer Fantasy Roleplay for Arcane magazine and stated that "It's true that in game mechanics terms WHFRP is nothing special. In fact it's downright chaotic, ugly and spiky. But damn me if there isn't a seed of greatness in this game – mostly in its setting. The Empire is a place I'll certainly come back to, probably armed with a copy of Call of Cthulhu or GURPS and some hastily scribbled conversion notes. Can't wait."

In a review of the third edition of Warhammer Fantasy Roleplay in Black Gate, John ONeill said "Typical for Fantasy Flight, the production values and art are top-notch. Best of all, they don't skimp on that most essential aspect of the boxed adventure: the goodies."

In his 2023 book Monsters, Aliens, and Holes in the Ground, RPG historian Stu Horvath noted, "The rules start to shine when they get into the character careers, which paint over a D&D-style class system with the trappings of trade in a way that is informative of the world and reflective of realistic life experience." Commenting about the setting, Horvath wrote, "That world is a real treat. Much of the lore is laid out in the book, but it comes alive through the way it is reflected in the game's systems." Horvath concluded by recalling the ignominious end of the system, writing, "The grim and the sardonic, all wrapped in a colorful motley, it seems, was the product of an all-too-brief moment in time."

== Awards ==
At the 2005 ENnie Awards,

- The second edition's core rulebook, Warhammer Fantasy Roleplay, won Gold for "Best Production Values" and "Best Game".
- Old World Bestiary, the second edition's primary adversary publication, also won Gold in for "Best Adversary / Monster Product".

At the 2019 ENnie Awards, the fourth edition's core rulebook won Gold for "Best Writing".

== See also ==
- List of Warhammer Fantasy Roleplay publications
- Zweihander Grim and Perilous RPG – A game based on the rules set of Warhammer Fantasy Roleplay (2nd edition), but with rules tweaks and the Warhammer gameworld removed.
